= Jeremy Sprinkle =

American football player (born 1994)

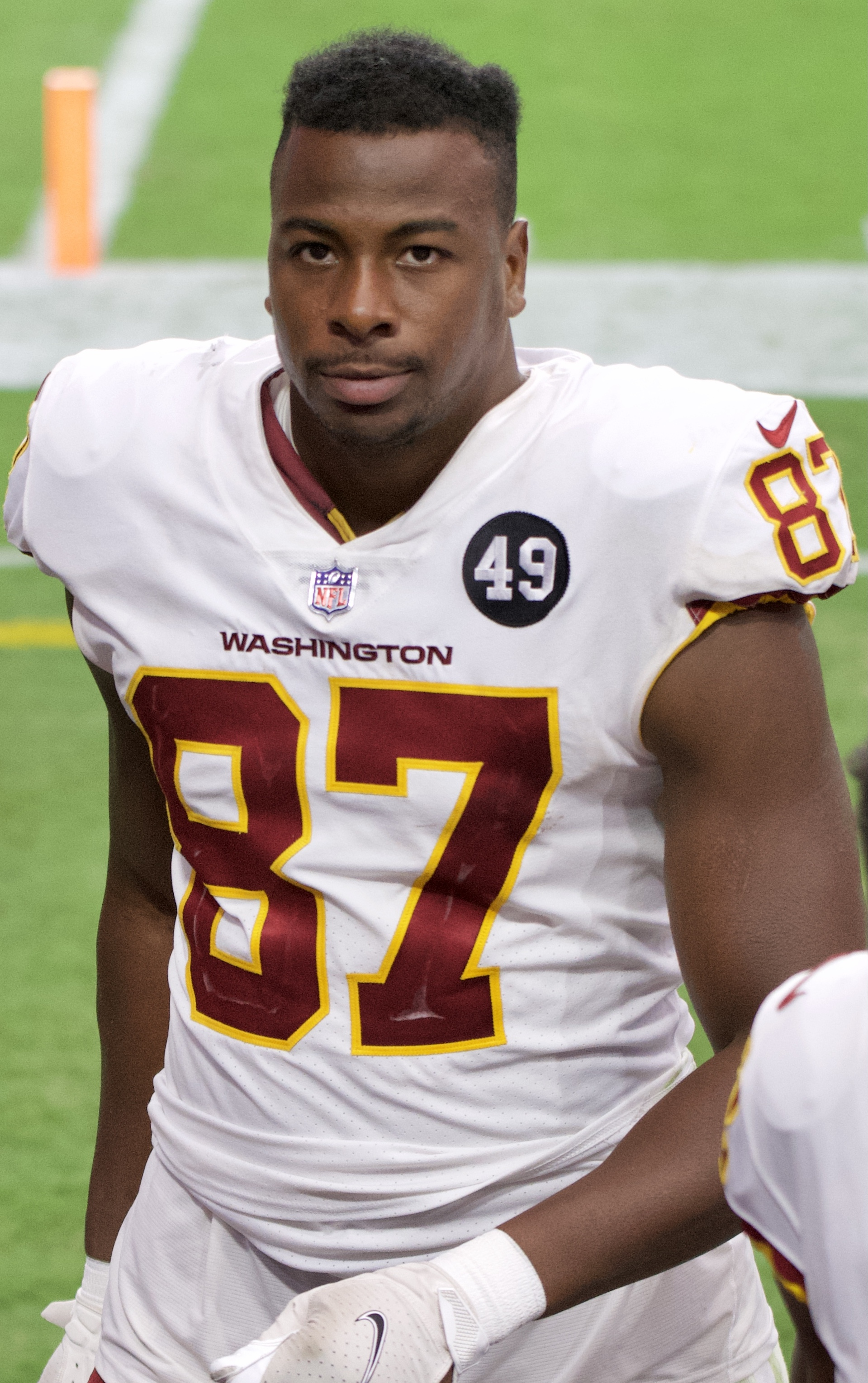
- Sprinkle with the Washington Football Team in 2020

No. 87
- Position: Tight end

Personal information
- Born: August 10, 1994 (age 32); Pine Bluff, Arkansas, U.S.
- Listed height: 6 ft 5 in (1.96 m)
- Listed weight: 257 lb (117 kg)

Career information
- High school: White Hall (White Hall, Arkansas)
- College: Arkansas (2012-2016)
- NFL draft: 2017: 5th round, 154th overall pick

Career history
- Washington Redskins / Football Team (2017–2020); Dallas Cowboys (2021)

Career NFL statistics
- Games played: 76
- Receptions: 37
- Receiving yards: 332
- Receiving touchdowns: 3
- Stats at Pro Football Reference

Jeremy Sprinkle (born August 10, 1994) is an American former professional football player who was a tight end for five seasons in the National Football League (NFL). He was selected by the Washington Redskins in the 2017 NFL draft. He played college football for the Arkansas Razorbacks. He spent the majority of his career in Washington and played one season for the Dallas Cowboys.

== Early life ==
Sprinkle attended White Hall High School, where he was a two-way player at tight end and defensive end. As a junior, he collected 10 receptions for 227 yards, 3 touchdowns, 73 tackles (25 for loss) and 15 sacks.

As a senior, he tallied 45 receptions for 841 yards, 6 touchdowns, 92 tackles and 14 sacks. He contributed to the team winning the 2011 5A Southeast Conference championship and reach its first state semifinal in 20 years. He received 2011 Arkansas Super Team and All-Southeast Arkansas honors.

He also practiced basketball and baseball.

== College career ==
A 3-star recruit, Sprinkle accepted a football scholarship from the University of Arkansas over offers from Kansas, Louisville, Mississippi State, and Purdue, among others. At Arkansas, he played under head coaches John L. Smith and Bret Bielema.

As a redshirt freshman in 2013, fellow classmate Hunter Henry received most of the targets at the tight end position. He appeared in all 12 games with two starts, making four receptions for 68 yards.

As a sophomore in 2014, he was the third-string tight end behind Henry and senior A. J. Derby. He appeared in all 13 games, registering seven receptions for 84 yards and a receiving touchdown.

As a junior in 2015, even though Henry recorded a majority of the production as the starter, Sprinkle had 27 receptions for 389 yards and led all Southeastern Conference tight ends with six receiving touchdowns. All of his touchdowns came over the final seven contests of the season. He had three touchdown catches against Mississippi State University, tying the school's single-game record. He made 4 receptions for 81 yards and one touchdown against Kansas State University.

As a senior in 2016, with the departure of Henry to the 2016 NFL draft, Sprinkle took over as the starter. He shared time with newcomer Austin Cantrell. He started 11 out of 12 games, making 33 receptions for 380 yards and fourtouchdowns (tied for second on the team). He became the school's All-time leader for receiving touchdowns by a tight end with 11.

== Professional career ==
=== Pre-draft ===
On November 28, 2016, it was announced that Sprinkle had accepted his invitation to play in the 2017 Senior Bowl, along with Arkansas' punter Toby Baker. On January 28, 2017, Sprinkle played in the Senior Bowl and caught one 18-yard pass from Pitts's Nathan Peterman. He was a part of Chicago Bears head coach John Fox's North team, who lost 16-15 to the South.

Sprinkle was one of 19 tight ends who received an invitation to participate at the NFL Scouting Combine in Indianapolis, Indiana. Sprinkle performed the majority of drills and had a mediocre performance, finishing 14th among tight ends in the vertical jump and 10th in the 40-yard dash and broad jump. On March 15, 2017, Sprinkle opted to participate at Arkansas' pro day, along with Cody Hollister, Dan Skipper, Jeremiah Ledbetter, and 13 other prospects. Sprinkle chose to perform all of his combine drills after his showing at the combine was lackluster. He successfully had better times and measures in all of them.

At the conclusion of the pre-draft process, Sprinkle was projected to be a fourth or fifth round pick by NFL draft experts and scouts. He was ranked the fifth best tight end in the draft by NFL analyst Gil Brandt, the eighth best tight end by NFL analyst Mike Mayock, and the 11th best tight end prospect in the draft by NFLDraftScout.com.

Pre-draft measurables
Height	Weight	Arm length	Hand span	40-yard dash	10-yard split	20-yard split	20-yard shuttle	Three-cone drill	Vertical jump	Broad jump	Bench press
6 ft 4 7/8 in (1.95 m)	252 lb (114 kg)	34 1/2 in (0.88 m)	10 3/4 in (0.27 m)	4.69 s	1.67 s	2.74 s	4.53 s	7.10 s	29 in (0.74 m)	9 ft 8 in (2.95 m)	15 reps
All values from NFL Combine/Arkansas' Pro Day

=== Washington Redskins / Football Team ===
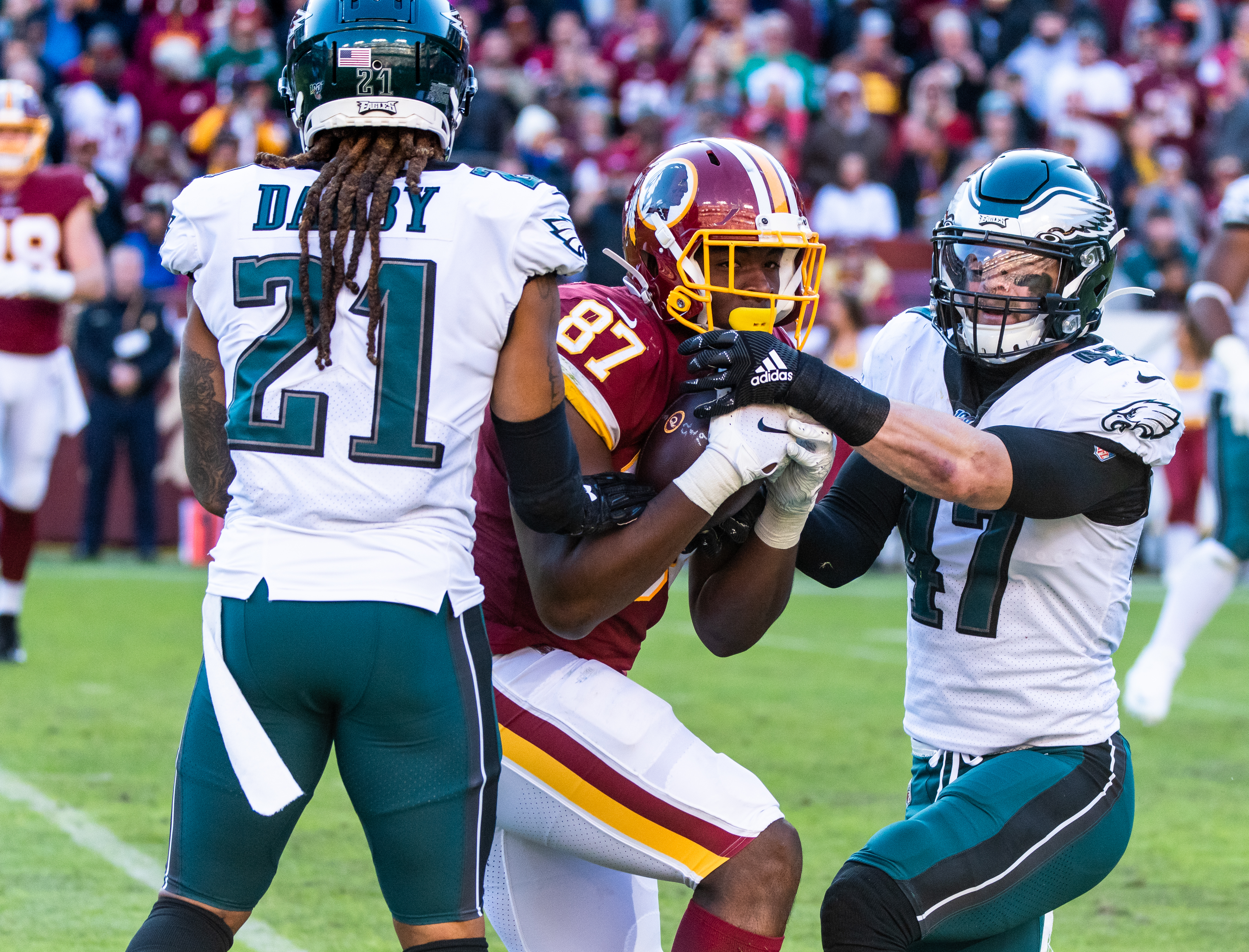
Sprinkle in a game against the Philadelphia Eagles in 2019.

Sprinkle was selected by the Washington Redskins in the fifth round (154th overall) of the 2017 NFL draft. On May 11, 2017, Sprinkle signed his four-year rookie contract, worth US$2.67 million contract. Throughout training camp, Sprinkle competed for a roster spot with Niles Paul and Derek Carrier. Head coach Jay Gruden named him the fourth tight end on the depth chart to start the regular season, behind veterans Jordan Reed, Vernon Davis, and Niles Paul.

He made his professional regular season debut and first career start during a Week 3 matchup against the Oakland Raiders after being inactive for the first two games. Sprinkle earned the start after Reed suffered a hamstring injury and was unable to play. Although he was held without a catch, the Redskins went on to win 27-10. Sprinkle was a healthy scratch from Weeks 6-8 after Reed returned from injury. He was activated by the Redskins in Week 9 after Reed aggravated his hamstring injury. On November 19, 2017, Sprinkle caught his first career reception on a seven-yard touchdown pass from quarterback Kirk Cousins during Washington's 34-31 loss at the New Orleans Saints. Overall, he played in 11 games in his rookie season and recorded two receptions for 13 yards and a touchdown.

In the 2018 season, he appeared in all 16 games with nine starts, posting five receptions for 41 yards, one touchdown and a 6-yard kickoff return. In the 2019 season, he appeared in all 16 games with 13 starts, registering 26 receptions for 241 yards and one touchdown. In the 2020 season, he appeared in 16 games and started six and contributed on special teams.

=== Dallas Cowboys ===
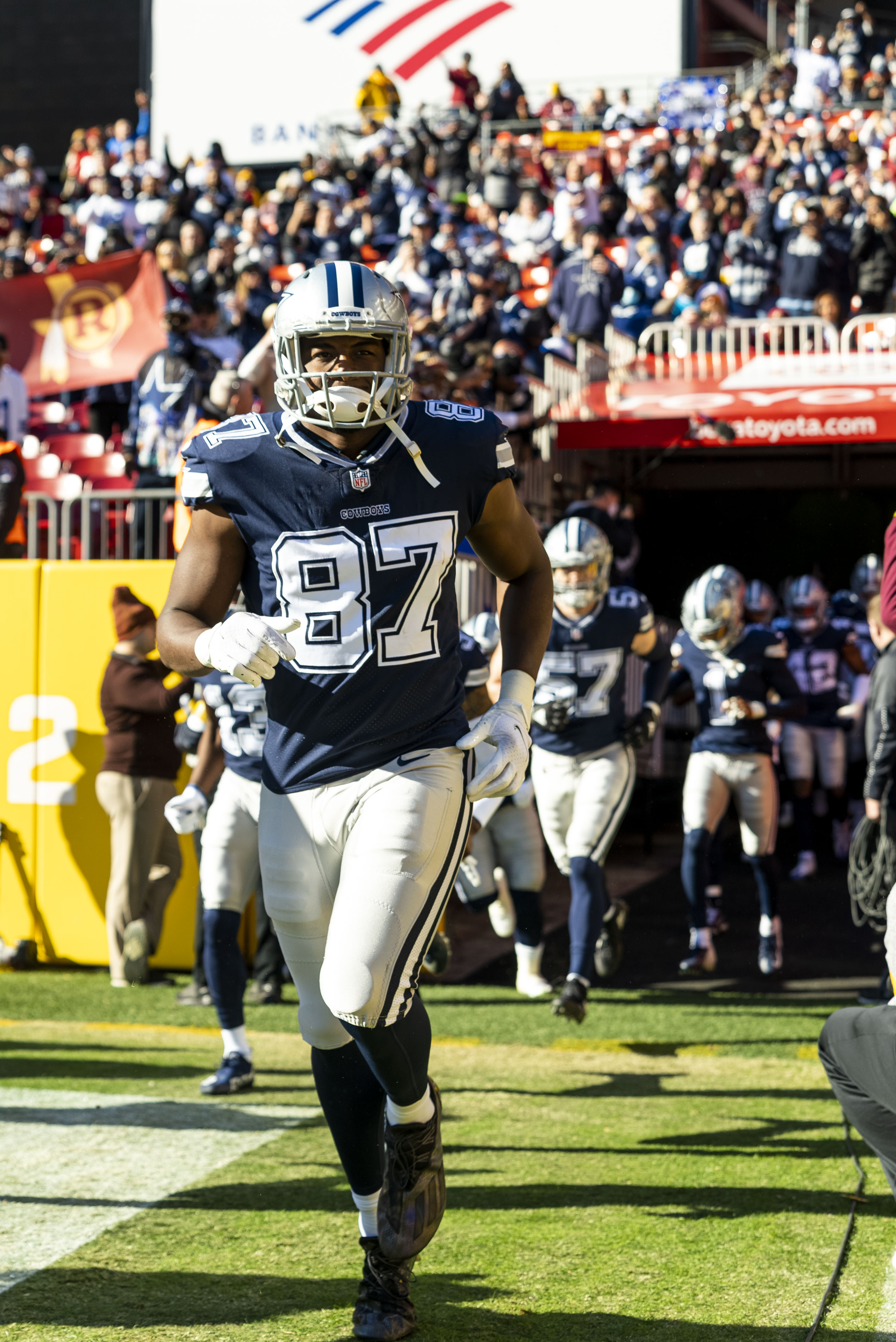
Sprinkle with the Cowboys in 2021.

On April 7, 2021, Sprinkle signed as a free agent with the Dallas Cowboys, with the intention of being used as a blocking tight end. He was released on August 31, 2021, and re-signed to the practice squad the next day. He was promoted to the active roster on October 16. He played in all 17 games - the fourth straight season he appeared in each game - and started four, seeing most of his time as the second-string tight end and on special teams. He totaled 3 receptions for 31 yards and 3 special teams tackles.

On March 15, 2022, Sprinkle re-signed with the Cowboys. In training camp, he fell on the depth chart behind rookies Jake Ferguson and Peyton Hendershot. He was placed on injured reserve with an Achilles injury on August 23. He was released with an injury settlement on August 26.

== Career statistics ==
=== NFL ===
Year	Team	Games		Receiving					Fumbles	
Year	Team	GP	GS	Rec	Yds	Avg	Lng	TD	Fum	Lost
2017	WAS	11	5	2	13	6.5	7	1	0	0
2018	WAS	16	9	5	41	8.2	15	1	0	0
2019	WAS	16	13	26	241	9.3	23	1	1	0
2020	WAS	16	6	1	6	6.0	6	0	0	0
Career		59	33	34	301	8.9	23	3	1	0

=== College ===
Year	School	Conf	Class	Pos	G	Rec	Yds	Avg	TD
2013	Arkansas	SEC	FR	TE	4	4	68	17.0	0
2014	Arkansas	SEC	SO	TE	12	7	84	12.0	1
2015	Arkansas	SEC	JR	TE	11	27	389	14.4	6
2016	Arkansas	SEC	SR	TE	12	33	380	11.5	4
Career	Arkansas					71	921	13.0	11

== Personal life ==
On December 27, 2016, Sprinkle was involved in a shoplifting incident during a Belk Bowl sponsored event in Charlotte, North Carolina. Players from Virginia Tech and Arkansas, who were playing in the upcoming Belk Bowl, were each given a Fossil watch, a $450 gift card, and 90 minutes to shop at a Belk store in the SouthPark Mall. Sprinkle concealed eight items worth an estimated $260 from his bag and attempted to steal the items. Charlotte-Mecklenburg Police Department responded to the incident. He was released later that night after being cited for unlawful concealment. He was suspended two hours before the 2016 Belk Bowl.
