= Battle at Bristol =

American college football game

| Virginia Tech Hokies | Tennessee Volunteers |
| (1–0) | (1–0) |
| ACC | SEC |
| 24 | 45 |
| Head coach: Justin Fuente | Head coach: Butch Jones |
| | AP / Coaches; 17 / 14 |
| | 1 | 2 | 3 | 4 | Total |
|---|---|---|---|---|---|
| Virginia Tech | 14 | 0 | 3 | 7 | 24 |
| Tennessee | 0 | 24 | 7 | 14 | 45 |
- Date: September 10, 2016
- Season: 2016
- Stadium: Bristol Motor Speedway
- Location: Bristol, Tennessee
- Favorite: Tennessee by 11.5
- National anthem: Jennifer Nettles
- Referee: Daniel Capron (Big Ten)
- Halftime show: Marching Virginians; Pride of the Southland Band
- Attendance: 156,990

United States TV coverage
- Network: ABC
- Announcers: Rece Davis (play-by-play); Kirk Herbstreit (analyst); Samantha Ponder (sideline); Dr. Jerry Punch (sideline); Marty Smith (sideline)

The Battle at Bristol was an American college football game played at Bristol Motor Speedway in Bristol, Tennessee, on Saturday, September 10, 2016, between the University of Tennessee Volunteers and the Virginia Tech Hokies. It holds the record for NCAA football's largest single-game attendance at 156,990. Sponsored by truck stop chain Pilot Flying J, the game was known as the Pilot Flying J Battle at Bristol.

== History ==
The first time football was ever played at Bristol Motor Speedway was an NFL exhibition game, held on September 2, 1961, between the Philadelphia Eagles and the Washington Redskins. The seating capacity for the speedway in 1961 was 18,000 people. Attendance for the game totaled 8,500 people.

The idea of a marquee college football game at Bristol Motor Speedway (BMS) was originally proposed in 1997. After years of planning and scheduling, a contract was eventually finalized in 2013 for a 2016 game. The event was originally named the Battle at Bristol, between Tennessee and Virginia Tech. From the beginning, a primary goal and reason for holding the game at Bristol Motor Speedway was to break the all-time college football attendance record (previously 115,109; set on September 6, 2013, in Ann Arbor, Michigan for a game between Michigan and Notre Dame).

A primary reason for Virginia Tech and Tennessee being selected for the game is that the speedway is approximately equidistant between the two schools. Also, the city of Bristol is separated by the Virginia/Tennessee state line along the center of their main street, State Street. The game was the ninth meeting between the teams and their first regular season game since 1937. The most recent meetings have been in bowl games: the 1994 Gator Bowl (Tennessee won 45–23) and the 2009 Chick-fil-A Bowl (Virginia Tech won 37–14).

Before kickoff, head coaches Butch Jones of Tennessee and Justin Fuente of Virginia Tech, along with Battle at Bristol officials, were presented with a plaque from Guinness World Records, stating that the Battle at Bristol had the largest audience to ever attend an American football game.

(Note: Guinness World Records lists the attendance for the game at 130,045 people, as opposed to 156,990 people as calculated by Bristol Motor Speedway. The reason for the disparity, as explained on the Guinness official website is: "Guinness World Records only counts bar-coded, ticketed attendance for all attendance based records globally. As such, the record number achieved was calculated by counting only those tickets scanned upon entry into the motorway. The number does not include un-scanned tickets or any VIP or sponsor credentials, media credentials, players, coaches, team support staffs, game officials or event personnel." The attendees omitted by this method are typically counted towards the official attendance number for college football game statistics.)

== Game summary ==
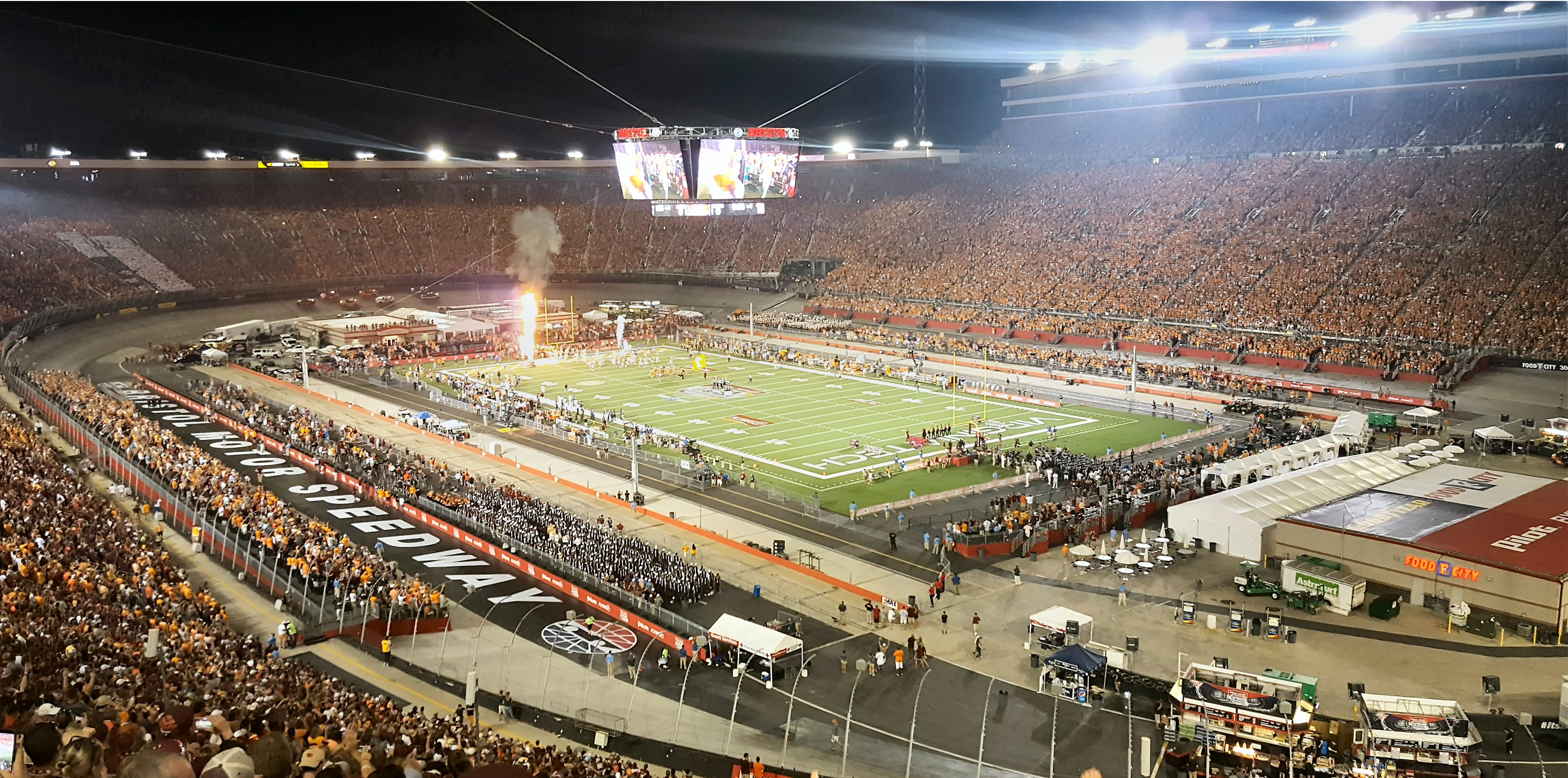
The game within the oval race track

The game took place at 8:00 p.m. ET on September 10, 2016, in week two of the 2016 college football season. It was featured as the Saturday Night Football prime-time game on ABC and was chosen to host College GameDay that week. To tie in with the venue, former NASCAR on ESPN reporters Dr. Jerry Punch and Marty Smith joined Rece Davis (who filled in for Chris Fowler, who was working the 2016 US Open), Kirk Herbstreit, and Samantha Ponder during the broadcast.

=== Pre-game ===
The coin toss ceremony featured alumni representatives from each school: Peyton Manning from Tennessee (1997) and Bruce Smith from Virginia Tech (1985).

=== 1st quarter ===
Tennessee won the opening coin toss but deferred to start the second half. Virginia Tech began the game from their 11-yard line and had a 13-play, 59-yard drive before stalling at the Volunteers' 30-yard line to give kicker Joey Slye a 47-yard field goal attempt which missed wide right. However, the Hokies' Ken Ekanem sacked Tennessee's quarterback Joshua Dobbs for a loss to end their opening drive. In the ensuing drive, Virginia Tech took eight plays to score first on a seven-yard pass from Jerod Evans to Sam Rogers. Tennessee was again forced to punt after a 3-and-out. Virginia Tech needed just two plays to score its second touchdown on Travon McMillian's 69-yard touchdown run. The teams swapped short drives to end the quarter. Virginia Tech led 14–0.

During the break between quarters, former Virginia Tech Head Coach, Frank Beamer was honored at mid-field with an ovation from the crowd for his contributions to college football in his 29 years as the Hokies' head coach and for his instrumental role in creating the Battle at Bristol.

=== 2nd quarter ===
Virginia Tech began the second quarter with possession, but quarterback Jerod Evans fumbled on their 16-yard line, the ball bounced behind him, and Tennessee's Micah Abernathy recovered it at the 5 yard line. Joshua Dobbs then passed to wide receiver Jauan Jennings to give Tennessee their first points. The Volunteers defense stiffened for the remainder of the quarter, allowing the Hokies to gain only 36 yards offensively. The Tennessee offense responded by finishing the first half with a 24–14 lead.

=== 3rd quarter ===
The third quarter remained scoreless until Joshua Dobbs ran for 31 yards on one play then, two plays later, hit running back Alvin Kamara down the sidelines with a 23-yard pass. Kamara avoided the defensive coverage to score. On the following drive, Virginia Tech managed to reach the Volunteers 9-yard line but had to settle for Joey Slye's field goal. Tennessee was awarded a first down in their next drive, when the Hokies were penalized 15 yards for roughing the passer. However, Virginia Tech soon forced a punt. Each team swapped scoreless drives, and Tennessee finished the 3rd quarter with a 31–17 lead.

=== 4th quarter ===
To start the fourth quarter, Virginia Tech's Mook Reynolds intercepted Joshua Dobbs's pass near midfield. However, a penalty at the end of the play and another to start the next drive pushed the Hokies back to their own 19 yard line. Quarterback Jerod Evans took his offense 45 yards in 10 plays, before a fumble recovered by Tennessee's Micah Abernathy ended the drive at the 21. Abernathy recovered his school-record third fumble, following Virginia Tech's mismanaging their punt return that ended a Tennessee drive. With only just over half a field to work with, Joshua Dobbs went the distance, scoring a few plays later on a 27-yard run. The Hokies fumbled again to start their next drive, giving the Volunteers the ball at the four-yard line. Running back John Kelly ran it in to cap Tennessee's scoring for the game. Virginia Tech totaled 79 yards in 10 plays on their final drive of the game, scoring on a 2-yard run by Shai McKenzie. Tennessee maintained final possession to run the clock out and close the game with a score of 45–24.

=== Post-game ===
A post game fireworks display and a trophy presentation to the Tennessee Volunteers were held on the field as fans exited the speedway.

=== Scoring summary ===
Battle at Bristol

| Quarter | 1 | 2 | 3 | 4 | Total |
|---|---|---|---|---|---|
| Virginia Tech | 14 | 0 | 3 | 7 | 24 |
| Tennessee | 0 | 24 | 7 | 14 | 45 |

at Bristol Motor Speedway, Bristol, Tennessee

- Date: September 10, 2016
- Game time: 7:00 p.m. CDT (8:00 p.m. EST)
- Game attendance: 156,990
- Referee: Daniel Capron (Big Ten)
- TV: ABC

Scoring summary

| Quarter | Time | Drive | | | Team | Scoring information | Score | |
| Quarter | Time | Plays | Yards | TOP | Team | Scoring information | VT | TENN |
|---|---|---|---|---|---|---|---|---|
| 1 | 4:32 | 8 | 62 | 3:11 | VT | Sam Rogers 7-yard touchdown reception from Jerod Evans, Joey Slye kick good | 7 | 0 |
| 1 | 2:49 | 2 | 77 | 0:47 | VT | Travon McMillian 69-yard touchdown run, Joey Slye kick good | 14 | 0 |
| 2 | 14:43 | 1 | 5 | 0:06 | TENN | Jauan Jennings 7-yard touchdown reception from Joshua Dobbs, Aaron Medley kick good | 14 | 7 |
| 2 | 9:42 | 4 | 90 | 1:39 | TENN | Josh Malone 38-yard touchdown reception from Joshua Dobbs, Aaron Medley kick good | 14 | 14 |
| 2 | 5:35 | 6 | 7 | 2:17 | TENN | 34-yard field goal by Aaron Medley | 14 | 17 |
| 2 | 0:39 | 9 | 58 | 3:21 | TENN | Joshua Dobbs 5-yard touchdown run, Aaron Medley kick good | 14 | 24 |
| 3 | 7:04 | 5 | 52 | 1:22 | TENN | Alvin Kamara 23-yard touchdown reception from Joshua Dobbs, Aaron Medley kick good | 14 | 31 |
| 3 | 3:45 | 7 | 42 | 3:23 | VT | 26-yard field goal by Joey Slye | 17 | 31 |
| 4 | 6:45 | 7 | 79 | 3:59 | TENN | Joshua Dobbs 27-yard touchdown run, Aaron Medley kick good | 17 | 38 |
| 4 | 6:32 | 1 | 4 | 0:05 | TENN | John Kelly 4-yard touchdown run, Aaron Medley kick good | 17 | 45 |
| 4 | 3:28 | 10 | 79 | 3:04 | VT | Shai McKenzie 2-yard touchdown run, Joey Slye kick good | 24 | 45 |
| "TOP" = time of possession. For other American football terms, see Glossary of American football. | | | | | | | 24 | 45 |

== Game statistics ==
| Statistics | VT | TENN |
|---|---|---|
| First downs | 24 | 16 |
| 3rd down efficiency | 7–14 | 3–13 |
| Rushes–yards | 45–186 | 46–238 |
| Passing yards | 214 | 91 |
| Passing: Comp–Att–Int | 20–28–0 | 10–19–1 |
| Time of possession | 31:44 | 28:16 |

== See also ==
- MLB Speedway Classic, an MLB game held at the same venue.
