= 2016 Belk Bowl =

- 15th Belk Bowl
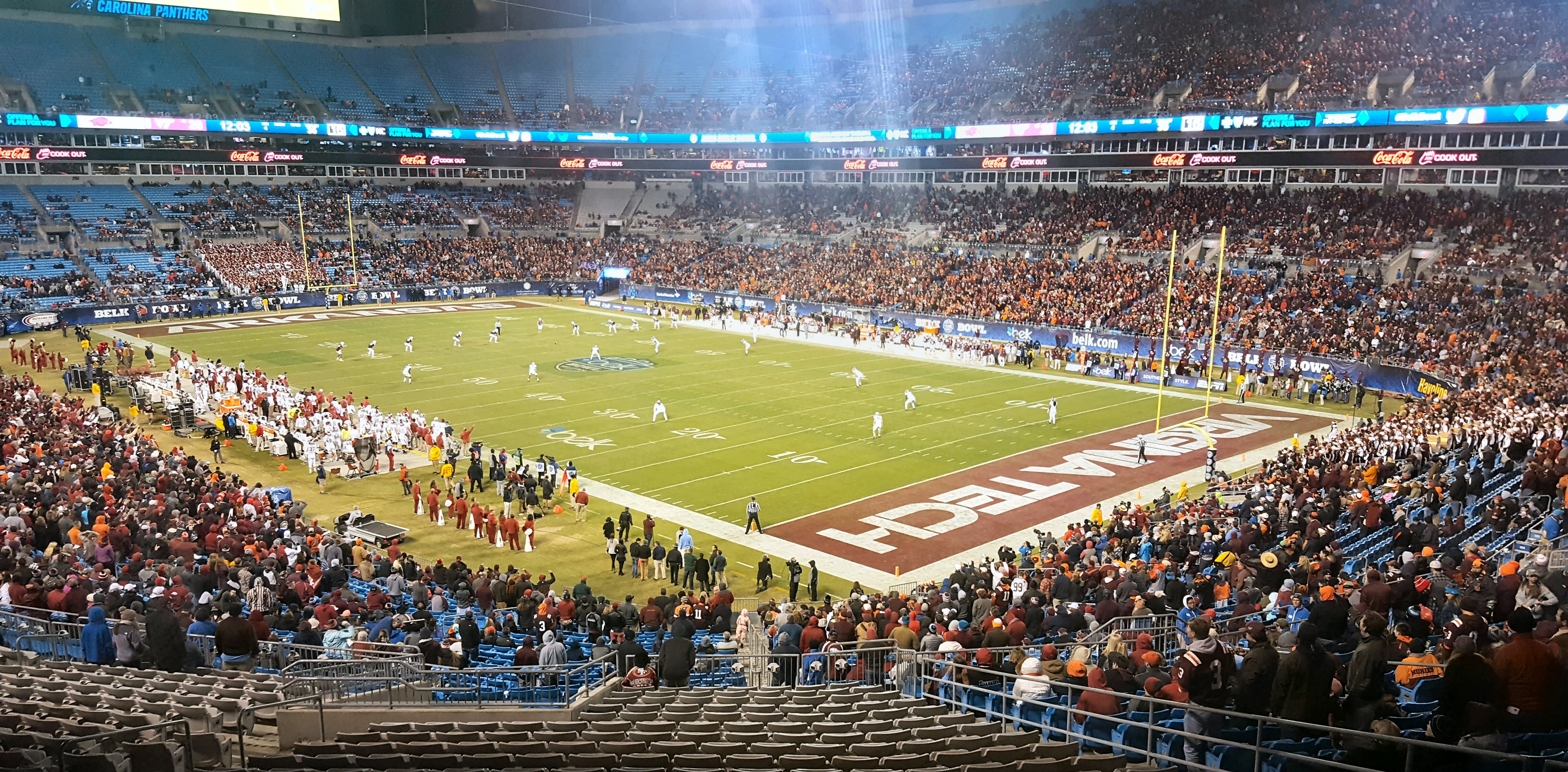
- Opening kickoff at the 2016 Belk Bowl
Arkansas Razorbacks	Virginia Tech Hokies
(7–5)	(9–4)
SEC	ACC
24	35
Head coach: Bret Bielema	Head coach: Justin Fuente
	AP / Coaches / CFP; 18 / 19 / 22
	1	2	3	4	Total
Arkansas	17	7	0	0	24
Virginia Tech	0	0	21	14	35
- Date: December 29, 2016
- Season: 2016
- Stadium: Bank of America Stadium
- Location: Charlotte, North Carolina
- MVP: Cam Phillips (Virginia Tech)
- Favorite: Virginia Tech by 7
- National anthem: Blue Honey
- Referee: Brandon Cruse (Big 12)
- Attendance: 46,902
- Payout: US$1,700,000

United States TV coverage
- Network: ESPN
- Announcers: TV: Mike Patrick, Ed Cunningham, Dr. Jerry Punch; Radio: Taylor Zarzour, Charles Arbuckle, Dari Nowkhah

The 2016 Belk Bowl was a postseason college football bowl game played on December 29, 2016. The game featured the Arkansas Razorbacks of the Southeastern Conference and the Virginia Tech Hokies of the Atlantic Coast Conference. It was the first appearance in the Belk Bowl for both teams.

== Teams ==
=== Arkansas ===
Prior to kickoff, Arkansas announced that senior tight end, Jeremy Sprinkle would be suspended for the bowl game. Sprinkle had been arrested for shoplifting earlier in the week. On Tuesday, all players from both teams received a $450 gift card to purchase merchandise from a Belk store within a 90 minute timeframe. Sprinkle allegedly took more than he was allowed and was suspended by the Arkansas athletic department.

=== Virginia Tech ===
With its 2016 Belk Bowl appearance, the Virginia Tech football team extended its bowl streak to 24 consecutive games. The streak is the longest active bowl streak recognized by the NCAA.

== Game summary ==
=== Scoring summary ===
Scoring summary

Quarter	Time	Drive			Team	Scoring information	Score	
Quarter	Time	Plays	Yards	TOP	Team	Scoring information	ARK	VT
1	13:23	4	6	1:24	ARK	38-yard field goal by Cole Hedlund	3	0
1	2:22	9	90	4:32	ARK	Austin Allen 1-yard touchdown run, Cole Hedlund kick good	10	0
1	0:21	2	30	0:40	ARK	Cheyenne O'Grady 28-yard touchdown reception from Austin Allen, Cole Hedlund kick good	17	0
2	10:05	6	54	3:36	ARK	Keon Hatcher 12-yard touchdown reception from Austin Allen, Cole Hedlund kick good	24	0
3	13:27	3	30	0:40	VT	Jerod Evans 4-yard touchdown run, Joey Slye kick good	24	7
3	4:18	5	44	2:10	VT	Sam Rogers 3-yard touchdown reception from Jerod Evans, Joey Slye kick good	24	14
3	4:00	1	5	0:05	VT	Chris Cunningham 5-yard touchdown reception from Jerod Evans, Joey Slye kick good	24	21
4	12:03	10	76	3:07	VT	Travon McMillian 6-yard touchdown run, Joey Slye kick good	24	28
4	6:41	2	8	0:16	VT	Jerod Evans 1-yard touchdown run, Joey Slye kick good	24	35
"TOP" = time of possession. For other American football terms, see Glossary of American football.							24	35

=== Statistics ===
Statistics	ARK	VT
First downs	14	25
Plays-yards	65-314	78-402
Third down efficiency	2-14	7-14
Rushes-yards	34-36	44-159
Passing yards	278	243
Passing, Comp-Att-Int	18-31-3	21-34-2
Time of Possession	31:14	28:46

Team	Category	Player	Statistics
ARK	Passing	Austin Allen	18/31, 278 yds, 2 TD, 3 INT
ARK	Rushing	Rawleigh Williams III	12 car, 34 yds
ARK	Receiving	Keon Hatcher	6 rec, 105 yds
VT	Passing	Jerod Evans	21/33, 243 yds, 2 TD, 1 INT
VT	Rushing	Jerod Evans	22 car, 87 yds, 2 TD
VT	Receiving	Cam Phillips	6 rec, 115 yds
