= Justin Fuente =

American football player and coach (born 1976)

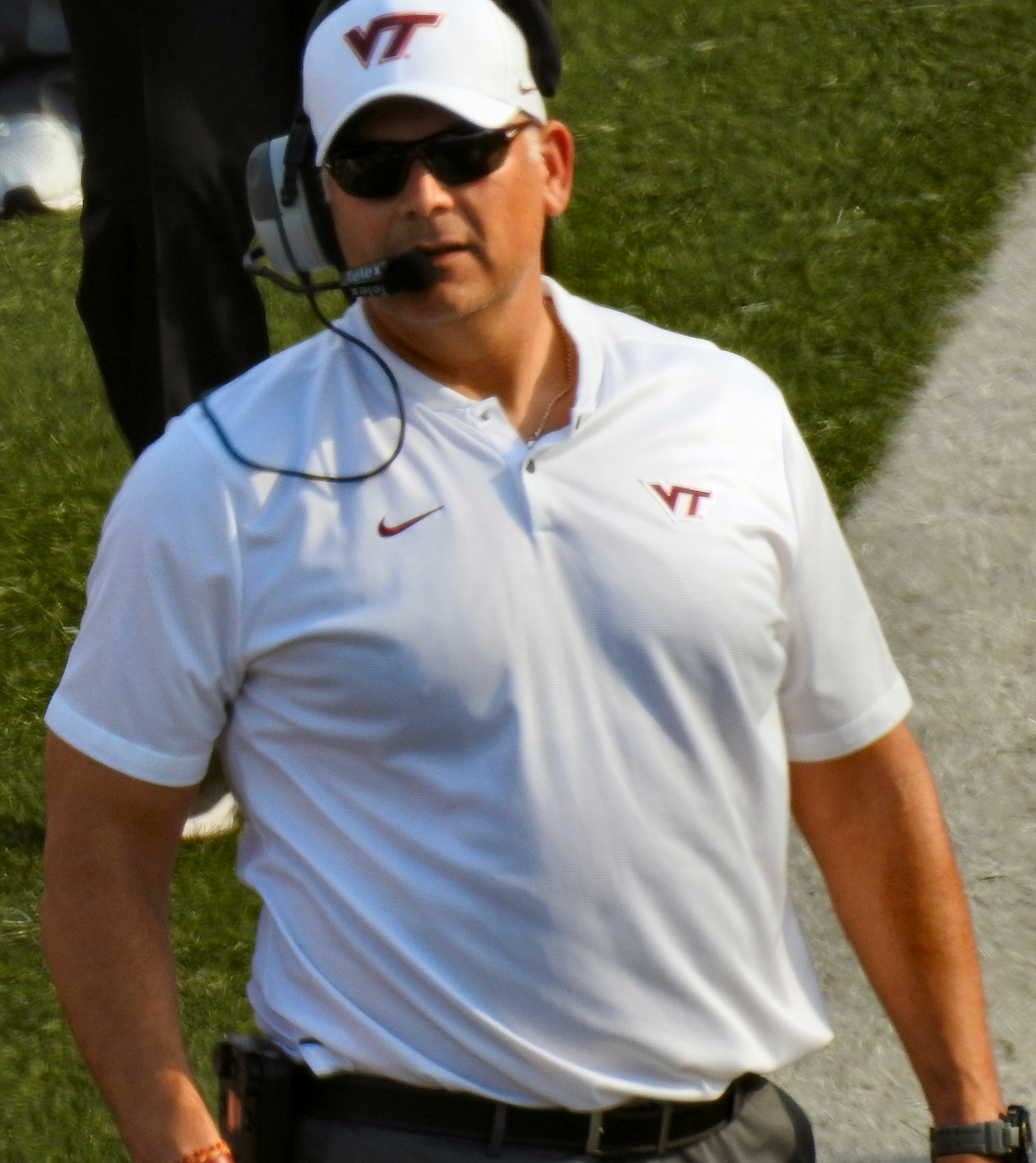
- Fuente in 2018

Biographical details
- Born: July 30, 1976 (age 50); Tulsa, Oklahoma, U.S.

Playing career
- 1995–1997: Oklahoma
- 1998–1999: Murray State
- 2000–2001: Oklahoma Wranglers
- Position: Quarterback

Coaching career (HC unless noted)
- 2001–2003: Illinois State (QB)
- 2004–2006: Illinois State (OC/QB)
- 2007–2008: TCU (RB)
- 2009–2011: TCU (co-OC/QB)
- 2012–2015: Memphis
- 2016–2021: Virginia Tech
- 2023: Indiana (analyst)

Head coaching record
- Overall: 69–54
- Bowls: 2–3

Accomplishments and honors

Championships
- 1 AAC (2014); 1 ACC Coastal Division (2016)

Awards
- AAC Coach of the Year (2014); ACC Coach of the Year (2016)

Justin James Fuente (born July 30, 1976) is an American college football coach. He was the head football coach at Virginia Tech from 2016 to 2021 and was the 2016 ACC Coach of the Year. Fuente was also the head football coach at the University of Memphis from 2012 to 2015. Prior, he was an assistant at Texas Christian University from 2007 to 2011 and at Illinois State University from 2001 to 2006. Fuente attended the University of Oklahoma before transferring to Murray State University after his redshirt sophomore season. He played quarterback for both schools. Fuente played a single season with the Oklahoma Wranglers of the Arena Football League.

Fuente has coached quarterbacks as an assistant or head coach including three-time Pro Bowler Andy Dalton, first-round draft pick Paxton Lynch, and arena football quarterback Jerod Evans.

== Early life ==
Fuente was born in Tulsa, Oklahoma. Justin married his wife Jenny in 2005 and they have three daughters. Fuente and his family are Catholic.

== Playing career ==
=== High school ===
Fuente attended Union High School in Tulsa and played football as a quarterback, where he threw for 6,104 yards and 65 touchdowns. In 1994, his senior season he led the state in both passing yards (2,934) and touchdown passes (32). Statewide recognition followed, with the Tulsa World naming him "Player of the Year" and The Oklahoman "All-State Offensive Player of the Year.". Several schools recruited Fuente, including Oklahoma, Oklahoma State, Tulsa and Texas A&M, but he ultimately signed with Oklahoma under coach Howard Schnellenberger in February 1995.

=== College ===
Fuente redshirted at Oklahoma for the 1995 season behind Eric Moore at quarterback. Following the season, Schnellenberger resigned as head coach and John Blake replaced him. Entering the 1996 season, Fuente backed up Moore. However, after Oklahoma opened the season with a loss to TCU, Blake named Fuente the starting quarterback. Fuente started the next eight games and compiled a 3–5 record before losing his starting position to Moore following the victory over Oklahoma State. For the year, Fuente completed 91 of 196 passes for 1,271 yards with ten interceptions and eight touchdowns. Fuente entered the 1997 season as the starting quarterback, but started only five games, winning two and losing three. Following the season, he transferred to Division I-AA Murray State University where he would be able to compete in the 1998 season. Fuente amassed 2,289 yards with the Sooners.

At Murray State, Fuente was named the Ohio Valley Conference Offensive Player of the Year and a finalist for the Walter Payton Award following the 1999 season. He still holds several single-season records at Murray State for a quarterback including: most pass completions (240), highest pass efficiency (151.21), most passing yards (3,497), and most touchdown passes (27). Following his graduation from Murray, Fuente signed a contract with the Oklahoma Wranglers of the Arena Football League.

=== Professional ===
In May 2000, Fuente signed a contract with the Wranglers as their third-string quarterback. After seeing limited action, in the 2000 season and into the 2001 season, Fuente left the team in May 2001 in order to pursue a college coaching position at Illinois State University.

== Coaching career ==
Following his playing career, Fuente began his coaching career as the quarterbacks coach at Illinois State University in 2001. There he worked under Denver Johnson, who he played for when Johnson was an assistant coach at Oklahoma and as head coach at Murray State. After three years, Fuente was promoted to offensive coordinator, and he served in that position through the end of 2006 season when he accepted the running backs coach position at Texas Christian University (TCU). At TCU, he was promoted to co-offensive coordinator in 2009, and under his guidance both helped develop Andy Dalton at quarterback and lead the Horned Frogs to an undefeated season and victory in the 2011 Rose Bowl.

=== Memphis ===
The University of Memphis named Fuente its head coach on December 8, 2011, replacing Larry Porter. After the Tigers opened the 2012 season with only one win over their first nine games, Fuente led Memphis on a three-game winning streak to close the season and finish with an overall record of four wins and eight losses (4–8). In February 2013, Memphis extended the term of Fuente's contract through the 2017 season as a result of the gains he made in his first year as head coach of the Tigers.

Fuente's 2014 team captured a share of the American Athletic Conference championship, compiling a 7–1 conference record and 9–3 overall regular season record. This was the Tigers' first conference championship since winning the Missouri Valley Conference in 1971. The team defeated BYU in the 2014 Miami Beach Bowl in double overtime, giving Fuente his first 10-win season and the Tigers' first 10-win season since 1938. The Tigers finished the season ranked No. 25 in both the AP and the Coaches Polls. Fuente was named a finalist for the Eddie Robinson Coach of the Year award. Fuente's contract was extended and he received a raise at the close of the 2014 season for a total of a 5-year deal at approximately $1.4 million per year.

=== Virginia Tech ===
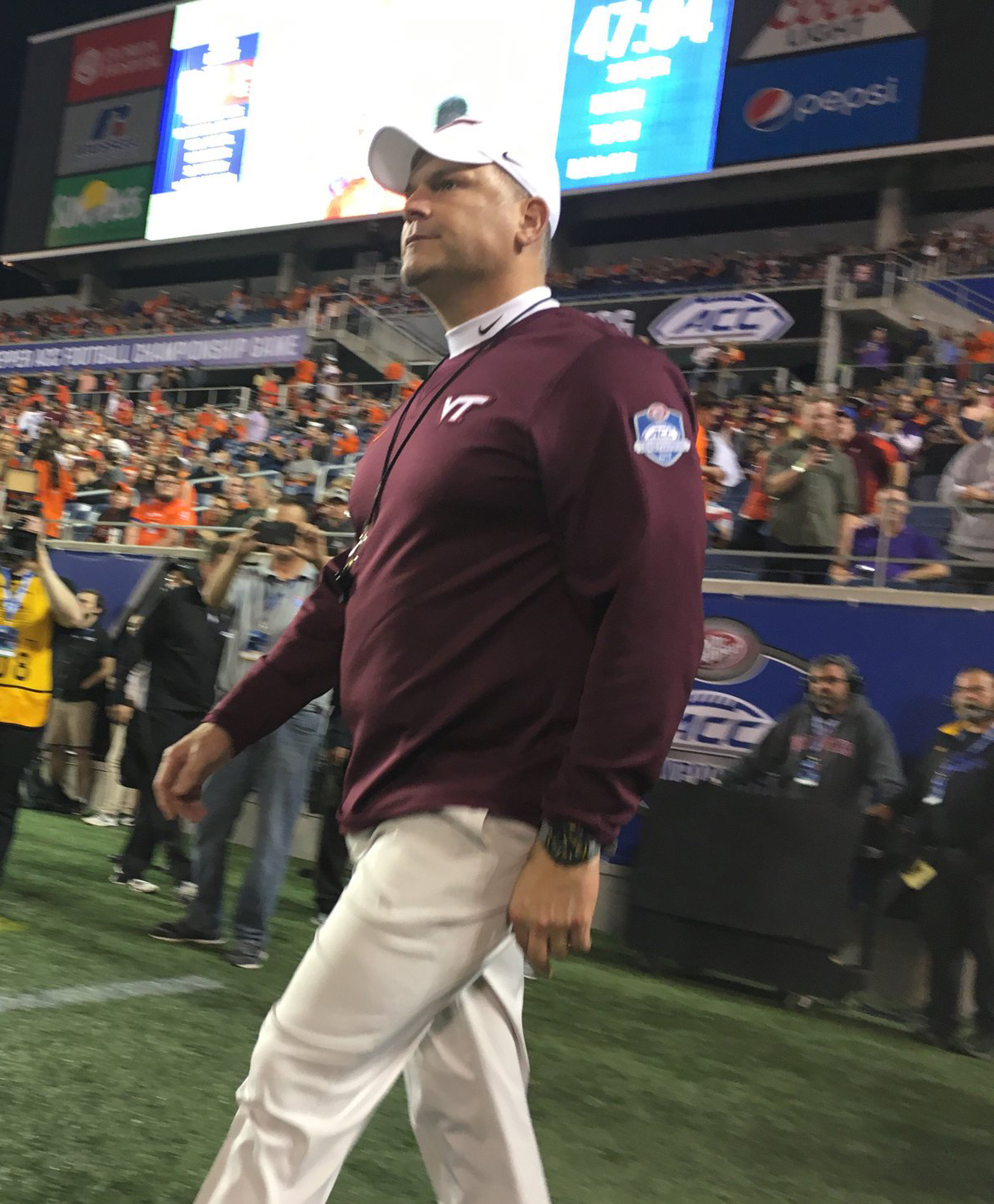
Fuente walks onto the field for the 2016 ACC Championship Game.

Virginia Tech named Fuente its head coach on November 29, 2015, replacing the retiring Frank Beamer. In his first season in Blacksburg, Fuente led the Hokies to a 9–3 regular season record and a trip to the ACC Championship, representing the Coastal division. Fuente won the 2016 ACC Coach of the Year following the regular season. The Hokies defeated the Arkansas Razorbacks 35–24 in the 2016 Belk Bowl, overturning a 24–0 deficit at halftime and winning three consecutive bowl games for the first time in the program's history. Virginia Tech finished the season ranked #16 in both the AP and Coaches Poll. On April 3, 2017, Fuente and Virginia Tech agreed to a contract extension through 2023. In 2020, during the COVID-19 pandemic college football season, Fuente's Hokies declined a bowl invitation after a player vote, snapping the program's 29-year streak of bowl games, the longest such in the country at the time. Virginia Tech and Fuente agreed to mutually part ways with two games remaining in the 2021 season after losses to Boston College, Syracuse, Notre Dame, and Pittsburgh.

=== After Virginia Tech ===
Tom Allen hired Fuente as an offensive analyst at Indiana in October 2023 following the firing of Walt Bell as offensive coordinator. Indiana fired Allen following the season and hired Curt Cignetti to replace him; Cignetti retained only Bob Bostad from Allen's staff. Fuente has expressed little interest in coaching since due to the "current state of things" in college football, disliking how the relationship between players and coaches "now is purely transactional".

In 2025, he became a radio color commentator for TCU games. Fuente was also named a senior advisor to the College Football Playoff.

== Head coaching record ==
Year	Team	Overall	Conference	Standing	Bowl/playoffs	Coaches^{#}	AP^{°}
Memphis Tigers (Conference USA) (2012)
2012	Memphis	4–8	4–4	T–3rd (East)			
Memphis Tigers (American Athletic Conference) (2013–2015)
2013	Memphis	3–9	1–7	T–9th			
2014	Memphis	10–3	7–1	T–1st	W Miami Beach	25	25
2015	Memphis	9–3	5–3	3rd (West)	Birmingham (Note: Did not coach bowl game)		
Memphis:		26–23	17–15				
Virginia Tech Hokies (Atlantic Coast Conference) (2016–2021)
2016	Virginia Tech	10–4	6–2	1st (Coastal)	W Belk	16	16
2017	Virginia Tech	9–4	5–3	2nd (Coastal)	L Camping World	25	24
2018	Virginia Tech	6–7	4–4	T–3rd (Coastal)	L Military		
2019	Virginia Tech	8–5	5–3	2nd (Coastal)	L Belk		
2020	Virginia Tech	5–6	5–5	T–6th			
2021	Virginia Tech	5–5 (Note: Virginia Tech and Fuente parted ways with two games remaining in the regular season)	2-2	(Coastal)			
Virginia Tech:		43–31	27–19				
Total:		69–54					
National championship Conference title Conference division title or championship game berth
^{#}Rankings from final Coaches Poll.; ^{°}Rankings from final AP Poll.
