= Bret Bielema =

American football player and coach (born 1970)

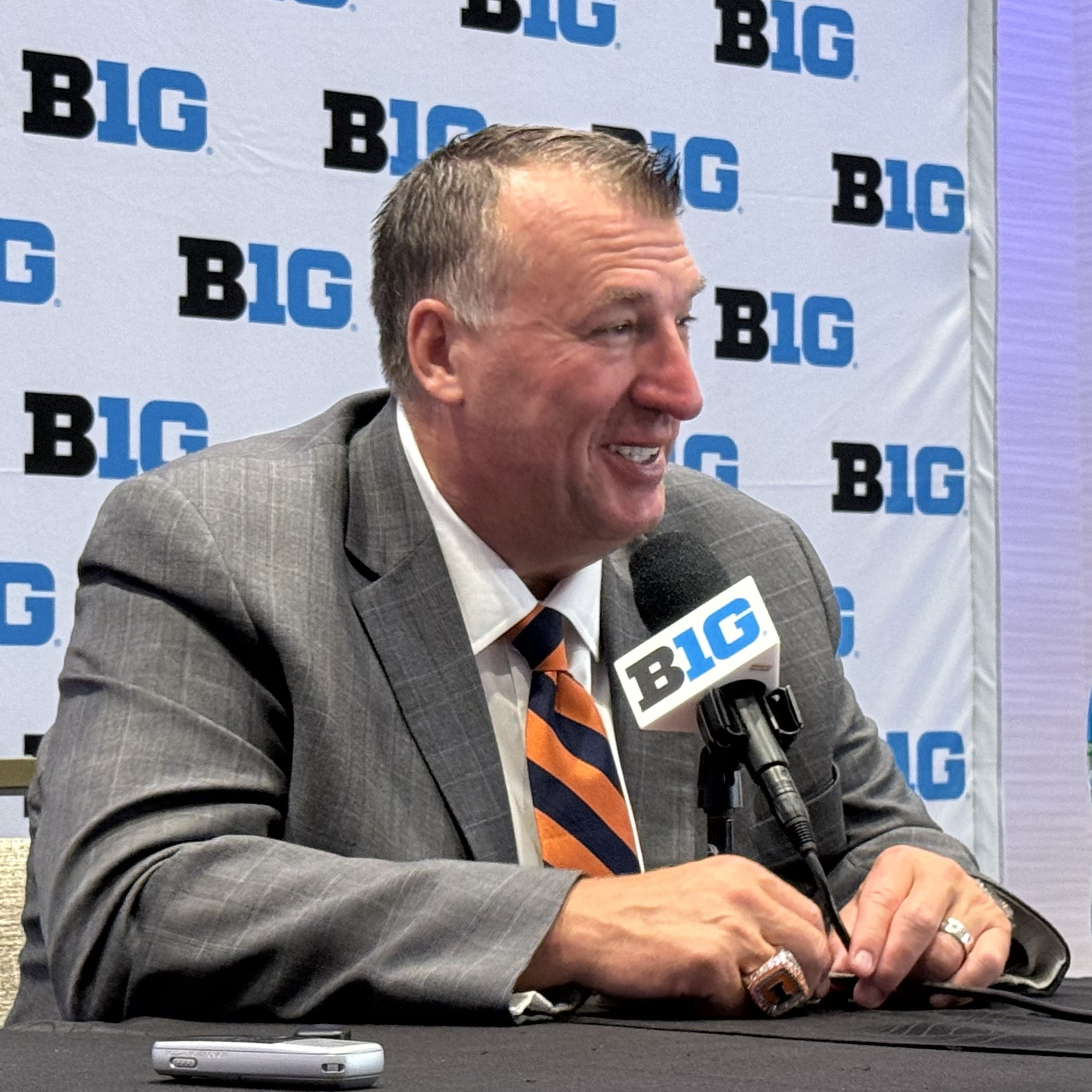
- Bielema in 2025

Current position
- Title: Head coach
- Team: Illinois
- Conference: Big Ten
- Record: 42–31
- Annual salary: $7.7 million

Biographical details
- Born: January 13, 1970 (age 56); Silvis, Illinois, U.S.

Playing career
- 1989–1992: Iowa
- 1994: Milwaukee Mustangs
- Position: Nose guard

Coaching career (HC unless noted)
- 1994–1995: Iowa (GA)
- 1996–2001: Iowa (LB)
- 2002–2003: Kansas State (co-DC)
- 2004–2005: Wisconsin (DC)
- 2006–2012: Wisconsin
- 2013–2017: Arkansas
- 2018: New England Patriots (consultant)
- 2019: New England Patriots (DL)
- 2020: New York Giants (OLB)
- 2021–present: Illinois

Head coaching record
- Overall: 138–89
- Bowls: 6–6

Accomplishments and honors

Championships
- 3 Big Ten (2010–2012); 1 Big Ten Leaders Division (2011); Super Bowl champion (LIII)

Awards
- Big Ten Coach of the Year (2006)

Bret Arnold Bielema (/ˈbiːləmɑː/; born January 13, 1970) is an American football coach who is the head football coach at the University of Illinois Urbana-Champaign, a position he has held since the 2021 season. He served as the head coach at Wisconsin from 2006 to 2012, achieving a 68–24 record and taking them to three straight Rose Bowl Games and at Arkansas from 2013 to 2017, tallying a mark of 29–34. Bielema was an assistant coach in the National Football League (NFL) for three seasons, in 2018 and 2019 with the New England Patriots and in 2020 with the New York Giants.

== Playing career ==
Bielema attended Prophetstown High School in Prophetstown, Illinois. He played tight end and linebacker in high school. Bielema walked on as a defensive lineman at the University of Iowa under coach Hayden Fry, playing from 1989 to 1992. Bielema lettered four years, earned a scholarship and served as team captain his senior season. Bielema was part of the 1990 Iowa team that won a share of the Big Ten title.

In his senior season, after Iowa beat Iowa State 21–7, Bielema approached Iowa State head coach Jim Walden for a post-game handshake and said "You’re a big prick. It’s been a pleasure kicking your ass the last five years" (Iowa State had never beaten Iowa during Bielema's tenure with the team). The moment caused a considerable stir, with University of Iowa officials reprimanding Bielema and sending an official letter of apology to Walden. Bielema graduated from Iowa with a bachelor's degree in marketing.

After going undrafted in the 1993 NFL draft, Bielema signed as a free agent with the Seattle Seahawks, but was cut during the summer. In 1994 he played for the Milwaukee Mustangs, a team in the Arena Football League.

== Coaching career ==
=== Assistant coach ===
==== Iowa ====
Bielema returned to Iowa in 1994 to begin his coaching career under Fry as a graduate assistant. In 1996, he was promoted to linebackers coach, a role he would hold until 2001. In 1998, Fry retired and was replaced by former Iowa offensive line coach Kirk Ferentz, who had briefly coached Bielema in offensive line sets during preparation for the 1988 Peach Bowl. Bielema, one of the leading recruiters on Fry's staff, continued on the road recruiting during the coaching search. Ferentz retained only Bielema and quarterbacks coach Chuck Long from Fry's staff. During his three years with Ferentz at Iowa, Bielema recruited several players, most from Florida, that would form part of the core of the 2002 Iowa team, including Heisman runner-up quarterback Brad Banks, wide receivers C. J. Jones and Maurice Brown, nose tackle Colin Cole, cornerback Antwan Allen, and linebackers Fred Barr and Abdul Hodge.

==== Kansas State ====
After the 2001 season, Bielema became co-defensive coordinator for the Kansas State Wildcats, coached by Bill Snyder, who had coached at Iowa with Fry for a decade. Bielema and Bob Elliott replaced Phil Bennett, who had left to become the head coach of the SMU Mustangs. Bielema coached the K-State defense for two seasons, helping the Wildcats win the 2003 Big XII Championship.

=== Wisconsin ===
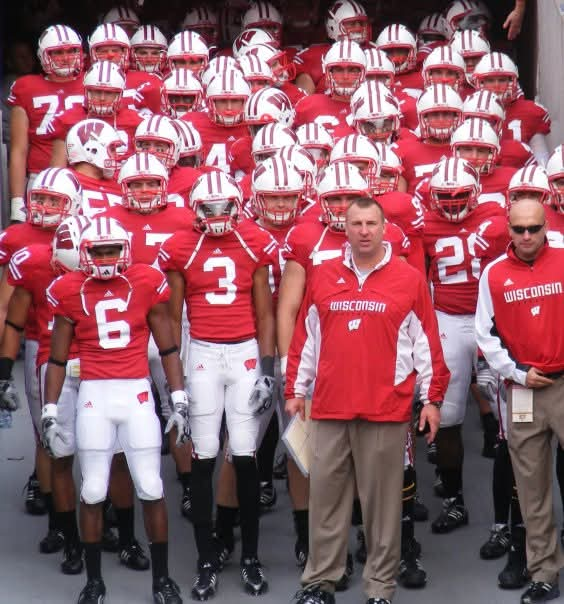
Bielema before a game at Camp Randall Stadium.

Bielema left Kansas State after the 2003 season to become the Wisconsin defensive coordinator under head coach Barry Alvarez, who had also coached at Iowa under Fry. Bielema served as defensive coordinator for two seasons. In July 2005, Alvarez announced he would retire after the 2005 season and become the Badger athletic director. Alvarez also announced he had chosen Bielema as his successor, and would take over in 2006.

In his first season as head coach of the Badgers in 2006, Bielema's team ended the regular season 11–1 (7–1 in Big Ten Conference play). With a 14–0 victory over San Diego State on September 16, 2006, Bielema became the third Wisconsin head coach to win the first three games of his career. Later, with a 24–3 win over Purdue on October 21, Bielema tied the record for most wins by a first-year coach at Wisconsin with seven. The other two coaches to complete this feat were Philip King in 1896 and William Juneau in 1912. A 30–24 victory over the Fighting Illini on October 28, Bielema became the first coach in Wisconsin history to win eight games in his first season. He extended the record with his ninth victory on November 4, defeating the Penn State Nittany Lions, 13–3. With a 24–21 victory over the Iowa Hawkeyes on November 11, Bielema became the first head coach in Big Ten history to win ten games in his first season. With the 35–3 defeat of the University at Buffalo on November 18, 2006, Bielema became the first coach in school history to win 11 games in the regular season. After a 17–14 victory over the Arkansas Razorbacks in the Capital One Bowl on January 1, 2007, he became the third coach in NCAA history to win 12 games in his rookie season, finishing 12–1. He was named Big Ten Coach of the Year.

Bielema coached Wisconsin to victories in 17 of his first 18 games. That represents the third-best start to a head coaching career in Big Ten history since Michigan's Fielding H. Yost, who went 55–0–1 from 1901 to 1905. He led Wisconsin to a 5–0 start in the 2007 season. He finished with a 9–4 record and #24 ranking in the final AP Poll. In the 2008 season, the Badgers regressed to a 7–6 record, despite a 3–0 start. Coming off of a disappointing 2008 campaign, Bielema helped lead the team to a 5–0 start to the 2009 season. The team finished #16 in the AP Poll with a 10–3 record, which was bookended by a 20–14 over the Miami Hurricanes in the Champs Sports Bowl.

On October 16, 2010, Bielema's Badgers defeated #1-ranked Ohio State, 31–18, in Madison. It was Wisconsin's first victory over a #1-ranked team since 1981 when the Badgers upset Michigan. The victory against the Buckeyes would be his only one as he was 1–5 against Ohio State. The 2010 season ended with a loss to the TCU Horned Frogs in the Rose Bowl, 21–19. The team finished with an 11–2 mark and a #7 ranking in the final AP Poll.

Bielema was named a finalist for the 2010 Bear Bryant Award which is given to college football's Coach of the Year. The other finalists were Chris Ault of Nevada, Gene Chizik of Auburn, Mark Dantonio of Michigan State, Jim Harbaugh of Stanford, Chip Kelly of Oregon, Gary Patterson of TCU, Bobby Petrino of Arkansas, and Mike Sherman of Texas A&M.

In the 2011 season, Bielema led the team to an 11–3 record and a #10 ranking in the final AP Poll.

Bielema is the only coach in Wisconsin history to lose consecutive Rose Bowls.

In the 2012 season, Bielema and the Badgers finished with 8–5 regular season record that culminated in a 70–31 victory over Nebraska in the Big Ten Championship Game.

=== Arkansas ===
On December 4, 2012, it was announced that Bielema was leaving Wisconsin to become the head coach of the Arkansas Razorbacks. He left partly to coach in the Southeastern Conference (SEC) and partly because he felt that his assistant coaches were not being paid enough. Bielema replaced John L. Smith, who had coached Arkansas to a 4–8 record during the 2012 season after Bobby Petrino had been fired eight months earlier.

Bielema's first season at Arkansas resulted in an overall record of 3–9, including 0–8 in the SEC. Bielema inherited a roster depleted of talent and lacking in development under Coach Smith. Bielema's starting quarterback also suffered a throwing shoulder injury, which limited his ability the entire season. It was the Razorbacks' worst SEC record since entering the conference in 1992 and their first winless in-conference season since 1942, when they were a member of the Southwest Conference.

Bielema's second season saw significant improvement, as Arkansas finished 7–6. Bielema won his first two SEC games in dominating fashion in November, beating #17 LSU by a score of 17–0 and #8 Ole Miss by a score of 30–0 to achieve bowl eligibility. Though Arkansas lost its remaining conference game against Missouri, the Razorbacks were still the first unranked team in college football history to shut out two consecutive ranked opponents. Bielema led Arkansas to a Texas Bowl victory in the postseason, defeating Texas handily, 31–7.

In Bielema's third season, the team suffered the loss of returning 1,190-yard starting running back Jonathan Williams before the season. Breaking in a new offensive coordinator and adjusting to losing three NFL drafted defensive players up front, the Razorbacks got off to a slow start, losing to Toledo and Texas Tech in the non-conference and started 2–4. Bielema then caught fire in the second half of the season, going 5–1 over the final six games, losing the one game to Mississippi State on a missed field goal. Bielema ended the year by defeating one of his former mentors, Bill Snyder, in the AutoZone Liberty Bowl, as Arkansas dispatched Kansas State, 45–23, to finish the season with a record of 8–5.

Bielema's fourth season was a topsy-turvy campaign that ended with two embarrassing defeats at the hands of Missouri in the regular season finale and Virginia Tech in the 2016 Belk Bowl. The former saw his team blow a 17-point halftime lead and the latter was a 24-point blown halftime lead, which was the largest for Arkansas since at least 1952. With those losses Bielema's Razorbacks would finish the year at 7–6, a step back record wise from the year before. The losses led to the replacement of Defensive Coordinator Robb Smith with former Iowa State head coach Paul Rhoads, and other staff changes pointing to a change to a 3–4 defensive scheme.

Bielema was the highest paid state employee in Arkansas with a salary reported at $4,200,000.

Bielema's fifth season saw the program continue to regress, finishing 4–8 overall and going 1–7 in the SEC. On November 24, 2017, Bielema was fired after five seasons as Arkansas's head coach following a 48–45 loss at home to the Missouri Tigers. The Razorbacks twice led by 14, but lost both leads. After the game, Bielema told reporters that he had been told he was being fired while he was coming off the field. According to Fox Sports' Bruce Feldman, school officials decided to announce the firing after the game so he could have a chance to address the team one last time before they headed home for Thanksgiving. The alternative would have been learning of the firing via social media or a group text message.

=== NFL assistant coach ===
==== New England Patriots ====
Prior to the 2018 NFL season, Bielema was hired by the New England Patriots as a defensive consultant to head coach Bill Belichick. Bielema was promoted ahead of the 2019 season to defensive line coach. He won his first Super Bowl title when the Patriots defeated the Los Angeles Rams in Super Bowl LIII.

==== New York Giants ====
On January 21, 2020, the Giants hired Bielema as their outside linebackers coach and senior assistant under Joe Judge.

=== Illinois ===
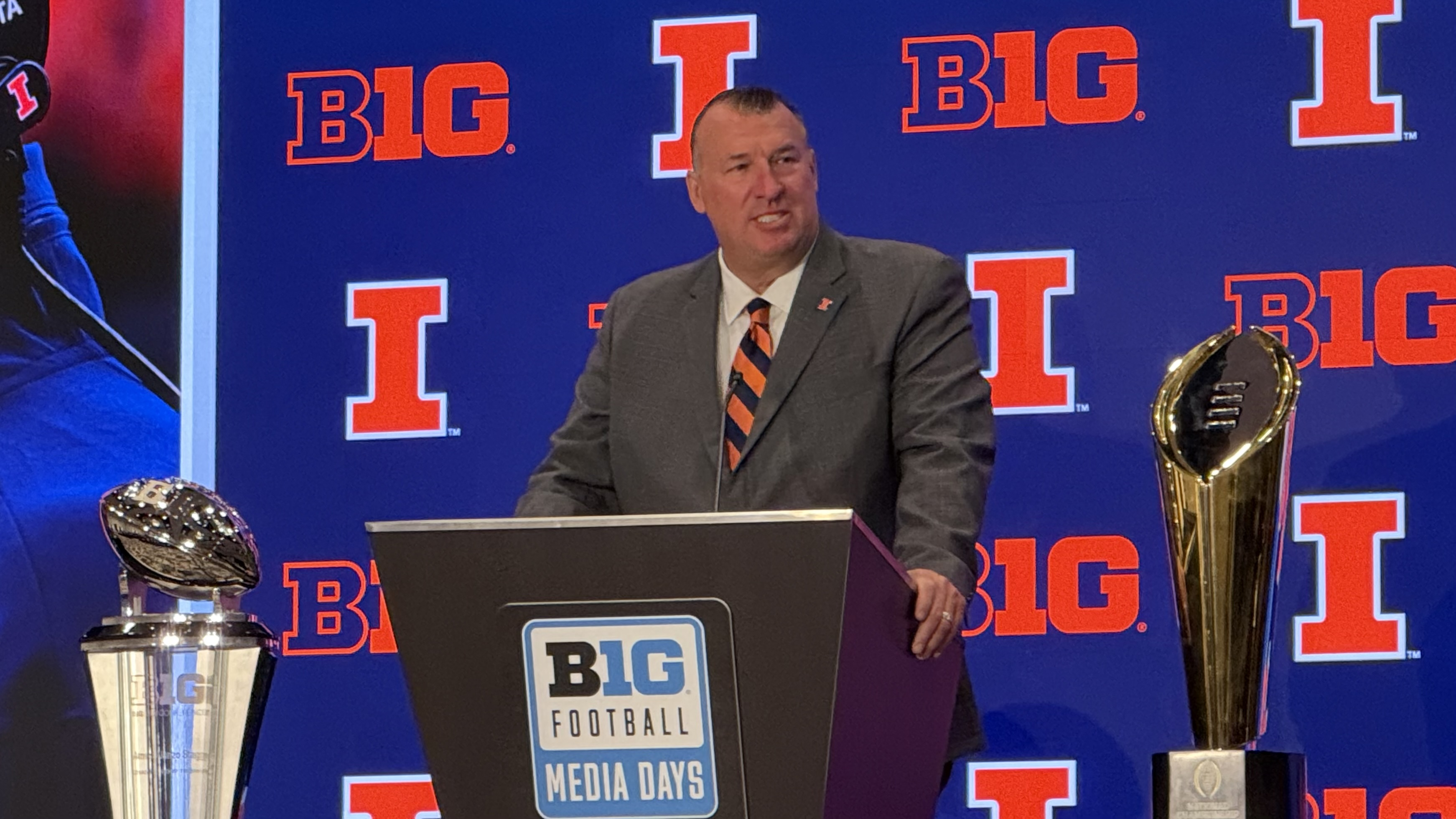
Bielema with Illinois in 2025

On December 19, 2020, Bielema was announced as the next head coach at the University of Illinois Urbana–Champaign, succeeding Lovie Smith. The school said Bielema would receive a six-year contract that paid $4.2 million the first year, with annual raises, based on performance and fulfilling media and other promotional obligations for the program throughout the contract. The salary made him the ninth-highest paid head coach among the then fourteen members of the Big Ten Conference.

Bielema won his first game with the Illini against the Nebraska Cornhuskers then went on a four-game losing streak to UTSA, Virginia, Maryland and Purdue. The streak ended with a win against Charlotte, but he lost the next week to Wisconsin, his former team. Following an off week, Bielema and the Fighting Illini upset 24.5-point favorite Penn State in Happy Valley, then ranked #7 in the AP Poll. The most notable part of this outcome was its nine overtime periods, which broke the FBS record for the most overtime periods in a game. The Illini lost their next game to Rutgers before upsetting Minnesota, then ranked #20 in the College Football Playoff poll. Bielema did not travel with the team to Iowa having contracting COVID-19, and the Illini lost to the Hawkeyes with wide receivers coach George McDonald serving as acting head coach. After Bielema returned, he won his final game of the season at home against Northwestern. This marked the Illini's first win against the rival Wildcats since 2014. Bielema finished his first season at Illinois with an overall record of 5–7, and a Big Ten record of 4–5, which placed the Illini fifth in the Big Ten West Division.

Bielema's second season at Illinois began with a victory over Wyoming, a disappointing loss at Indiana, followed by six consecutive victories over Virginia, Chattanooga, at Wisconsin, Iowa, Minnesota, and at Nebraska, making the Illini record 7–1. Bielema and Illinois could not maintain their win streak, dropping their next three games to Michigan State, Purdue, and at Michigan. The Illini won their eighth game of the 2022 season by beating in-state rival Northwestern in Evanston to close out the regular season with a record of 8–4. Illinois accepted an invitation to the 2023 ReliaQuest Bowl in Tampa on January 2, against the Mississippi State Bulldogs. Mississippi State, inspired by the untimely death of their head coach Mike Leach, beat Illinois 19–10 in the bowl. This was Illinois' first bowl game since 2019 and their first winning season since 2011.

In the 2023 season, Bielema and the Fighting Illini finished with a 5–7 record.

In the 2024 season, the Bielema-led Illini opened the season 4–0, with wins again Eastern Illinois, Central Michigan, and upset victories over the No. 19 Kansas Jayhawks and No. 22 Nebraska Cornhuskers, being ranked No. 19 in the country. The Illini then traveled to State College for an emergency white out matchup against the No. 9 Penn State Nittany Lions and lost 21–7. Following the loss, the Illini won two straight games, including a victory over the No. 24 Michigan Wolverines in the Memorial Stadium Rededication Game, celebrating 100 years since Red Grange's legendary performance against the Michigan Wolverines. The Illini then dropped a game to No. 1 Oregon in a blowout victory for the Ducks, and lost at home to the Minnesota Golden Gophers in a close game where quarterback Luke Altmyer fumbled the ball on a potential game-tying drive. The Illini then won three straight games, including a win at Rutgers, where wide receiver Pat Bryant scored a 40-yard touchdown on a pass from Luke Altmyer with 14 seconds left to seal the victory. The three game win streak to end the regular season was capped off by reclaiming the Land of Lincoln Trophy against the Northwestern Wildcats. Illinois accepted an invitation to the 2024 Citrus Bowl against the No. 15 South Carolina Gamecocks, where they emerged victorious riding a 2 touchdown performance from running back Josh McCray. The Illini finished the season with a 10–3 record, their first 10 win season since 2001 and first bowl game win since 2011.

In May 2025, Bielema and Illinois agreed to a new contract that would keep Bielema signed through the 2030 season with an annual salary starting at $7.7 million for the 2025 season. Illinois started the season #12 in the AP Poll. He led Illinois to a 8–4 regular season record, which involved a win over #21 USC. Illinois lost to his former team, unranked Wisconsin, 27-10, in late November. Illinois defeated Tennessee in the Music City Bowl 30–28 to finish 9–4.

== Personal life ==
Bielema grew up on an 80-acre hog farm near Prophetstown, Illinois with brothers Bart and Barry. Each of the brothers competed in football, track, and wrestling.

Bielema married Jen Hielsberg on March 10, 2012, in Madison. Their first daughter, Briella, was born in 2017. Their second daughter, Brexli, was born in 2019.

== Head coaching record ==
Year	Team	Overall	Conference	Standing	Bowl/playoffs	Coaches^{#}	AP^{°}
Wisconsin Badgers (Big Ten Conference) (2006–2012)
2006	Wisconsin	12–1	7–1	T–2nd	W Capital One	5	7
2007	Wisconsin	9–4	5–3	4th	L Outback	21	24
2008	Wisconsin	7–6	3–5	T–6th	L Champs Sports		
2009	Wisconsin	10–3	5–3	T–4th	W Champs Sports	16	16
2010	Wisconsin	11–2	7–1	T–1st	L Rose^{†}	8	7
2011	Wisconsin	11–3	6–2	1st (Leaders)	L Rose^{†}	11	10
2012	Wisconsin	8–5	4–4	3rd (Leaders)	Rose ‡^{†}		
Wisconsin:		68–24	37–19	‡Did not coach bowl game.			
Arkansas Razorbacks (Southeastern Conference) (2013–2017)
2013	Arkansas	3–9	0–8	7th (Western)			
2014	Arkansas	7–6	2–6	7th (Western)	W Texas		
2015	Arkansas	8–5	5–3	T–3rd (Western)	W Liberty		
2016	Arkansas	7–6	3–5	T–5th (Western)	L Belk		
2017	Arkansas	4–8	1–7	7th (Western)			
Arkansas:		29–34	11–29				
Illinois Fighting Illini (Big Ten Conference) (2021–present)
2021	Illinois	5–7	4–5	5th (West)			
2022	Illinois	8–5	5–4	T–2nd (West)	L ReliaQuest		
2023	Illinois	5–7	3–6	T–4th (West)			
2024	Illinois	10–3	6–3	T–5th	W Citrus	16	16
2025	Illinois	9–4	5–4	T–7th	W Music City	25	
2026	Illinois	6–5	4–4				
Illinois:		42–31	25–26				
Total:		138–89					
National championship Conference title Conference division title or championship game berth
^{†}Indicates BCS or CFP / New Years' Six bowl.; ^{#}Rankings from final Coaches Poll.; ^{°}Rankings from final AP Poll.

*Ohio State was the Big Ten Leaders Division champion, but third place Wisconsin represented the division in the Big Ten Championship Game due to the fact that Ohio State and second place Penn State were both ineligible from post-season play by the NCAA.
‡Bielema left for Arkansas before the bowl game and the ranking reflects the team's ranking at the time of Bielema's departure.
