= Coastal Division =

Coastal Division may refer to:

- A division of the Atlantic Coast Conference
- The former name of the NFC West, a division of the National Football League
