= 2016 Virginia Tech Hokies football team =

American college football season

2016 Virginia Tech Hokies football

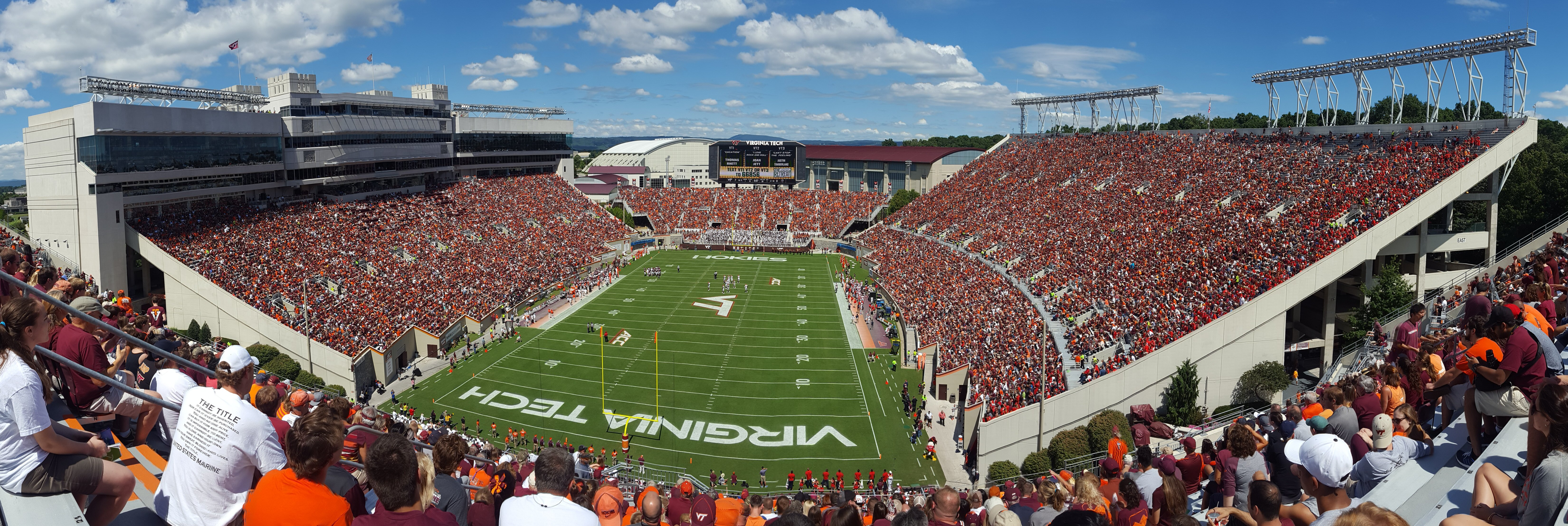
- Lane Stadium in the 2016 opener

ACC Coastal Division champion Belk Bowl champion

ACC Championship Game, L 35–42 vs. Clemson

Belk Bowl, W 35–24 vs. Arkansas
- Conference: Atlantic Coast Conference
- Coastal Division

Ranking
- Coaches: No. 16
- AP: No. 16
- Record: 10–4 (6–2 ACC)
- Head coach: Justin Fuente (1st season)
- Offensive coordinator: Brad Cornelsen (1st season)
- Offensive scheme: Spread
- Defensive coordinator: Bud Foster (22nd season)
- Base defense: 4–4
- Home stadium: Lane Stadium

Uniform
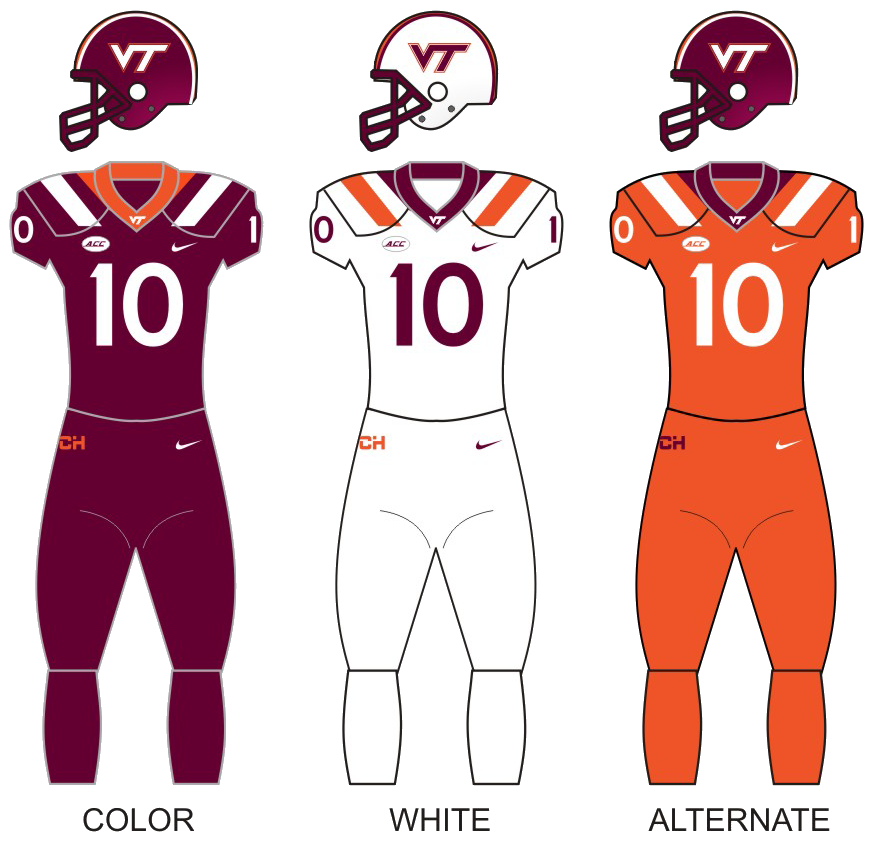

2016 Atlantic Coast Conference football standings
	Conf.			Overall
Team	W		L	W		L
Atlantic Division
No. 1 Clemson xy$#	7	–	1	14	–	1
No. 21 Louisville x	7	–	1	9	–	4
No. 8 Florida State	5	–	3	10	–	3
NC State	3	–	5	7	–	6
Wake Forest	3	–	5	7	–	6
Boston College	2	–	6	7	–	6
Syracuse	2	–	6	4	–	8
Coastal Division
No. 16 Virginia Tech xy	6	–	2	10	–	4
North Carolina	5	–	3	8	–	5
No. 20 Miami (FL)	5	–	3	9	–	4
Pittsburgh	5	–	3	8	–	5
Georgia Tech	4	–	4	9	–	4
Duke	1	–	7	4	–	8
Virginia	1	–	7	2	–	10
Championship: Clemson 42, Virginia Tech 35
# – College Football Playoff champion; $ – Conference champion; x – Division champion/co-champions; y – Championship game participant; Rankings from AP Poll

The 2016 Virginia Tech Hokies football team represented Virginia Tech in the 2016 NCAA Division I FBS football season. The Hokies were led by first-year head coach, Justin Fuente and played their home games at Lane Stadium in Blacksburg, Virginia. They competed in the Atlantic Coast Conference in its Coastal Division.

The Hokies finished the 2016 season with a regular season record of 9–3, winning its sixth ACC Coastal Division title. The Hokies played Clemson in the ACC Championship Game; Clemson won the game, 42–35.

Virginia Tech played Arkansas in the Belk Bowl on December 29, 2016. Arkansas took a 24–0 lead into halftime. However, in the second half, several Arkansas turnovers along with defensive adjustments, allowed Virginia Tech to score 35 unanswered points and win, 35–24. The comeback was the greatest in the team's 124-year history.

The Hokies finished the season with a record of 10–4, and ranked #16 in both the AP Poll and the Coaches Poll.

== Schedule ==
Date	Time	Opponent	Rank	Site	TV	Result	Attendance
September 3	12:30 p.m.	Liberty*		Lane Stadium; Blacksburg, VA	ACCN	W 36–13	62,234
September 10	8:00 p.m.	vs. No. 17 Tennessee*		Bristol Motor Speedway; Bristol, TN (Battle at Bristol) (College GameDay)	ABC	L 24–45	156,990^{‡}
September 17	3:30 p.m.	Boston College		Lane Stadium; Blacksburg, VA (rivalry)	ESPNU	W 49–0	60,054
September 24	12:30 p.m.	East Carolina*^{†}		Lane Stadium; Blacksburg, VA	ACCN	W 54–17	63,712
October 8	3:30 p.m.	at No. 17 North Carolina	No. 25	Kenan Memorial Stadium; Chapel Hill, NC	ABC/ESPN2	W 34–3	33,000
October 15	3:45 p.m.	at Syracuse	No. 17	Carrier Dome; Syracuse, NY	ESPNU	L 17–31	33,838
October 20	7:00 p.m.	Miami (FL)		Lane Stadium; Blacksburg, VA (rivalry)	ESPN	W 37–16	63,507
October 27	7:00 p.m.	at Pittsburgh	No. 25	Heinz Field; Pittsburgh, PA	ESPN	W 39–36	40,254
November 5	3:30 p.m.	at Duke	No. 19	Wallace Wade Stadium; Durham, NC	ESPNU	W 24–21	38,217
November 12	3:30 p.m.	Georgia Tech	No. 14	Lane Stadium; Blacksburg, VA (rivalry)	ESPNU	L 20–30	65,632
November 19	3:30 p.m.	at Notre Dame*		Notre Dame Stadium; South Bend, IN	NBC	W 34–31	80,795
November 26	12:00 p.m.	Virginia		Lane Stadium; Blacksburg, VA (Commonwealth Cup)	ESPN2	W 52–10	63,120
December 3	8:00 p.m.	vs. No. 3 Clemson	No. 23	Camping World Stadium; Orlando, FL (ACC Championship Game)	ABC	L 35–42	50,628
December 29	5:30 p.m.	vs. Arkansas*	No. 22	Bank of America Stadium; Charlotte, NC (Belk Bowl)	ESPN	W 35–24	46,902
*Non-conference game; ^{†}Homecoming; Rankings from AP Poll and CFP Rankings after November 1 released prior to game; All times are in Eastern time

Schedule source:

‡ – Current NCAA record for largest attendance for a collegiate football game.

== Game summaries ==
=== Liberty ===
	1	2	3	4	Total
Flames	6	7	0	0	13
Hokies	7	17	9	3	36

=== Vs. Tennessee ===
	1	2	3	4	Total
Hokies	14	0	3	7	24
#17 Volunteers	0	24	7	14	45

=== Boston College ===
	1	2	3	4	Total
Eagles	0	0	0	0	0
Hokies	14	7	21	7	49

=== East Carolina ===
	1	2	3	4	Total
Pirates	0	0	14	3	17
Hokies	14	24	9	7	54

=== North Carolina ===
	1	2	3	4	Total
#25 Hokies	6	7	14	7	34
#17 Tar Heels	0	3	0	0	3

=== At Syracuse ===
	1	2	3	4	Total
#17 Hokies	3	0	6	8	17
Orange	7	10	0	14	31

=== Miami (FL) ===
	1	2	3	4	Total
Hurricanes	3	6	7	0	16
Hokies	3	13	14	7	37

=== At Pittsburgh ===
	1	2	3	4	Total
#25 Hokies	6	10	13	10	39
Panthers	0	14	7	15	36

=== At Duke ===
	1	2	3	4	Total
#23 Hokies	7	14	0	3	24
Blue Devils	7	0	7	7	21

=== Georgia Tech ===
	1	2	3	4	Total
Yellow Jackets	6	14	0	10	30
#18 Hokies	0	0	7	13	20

=== at Notre Dame ===
Virginia Tech Hokies (7–3) at Notre Dame Fighting Irish (4–6)

Quarter	1	2	3	4	Total
Virginia Tech	0	14	7	13	34
Notre Dame	10	14	7	0	31

at Notre Dame Stadium, South Bend, Indiana

- Date: November 19, 2016
- Game time: 3:30 p.m. EST
- Game weather: Flurries, 38 °F (3 °C)
- Game attendance: 80,795
- Referee: Duane Heydt
- TV announcers (NBC): Dan Hicks, Doug Flutie, and Kathryn Tappen
- Box Score, Game Book

Game information

First quarter

- ND – Josh Adams 1-yard run (Justin Yoon kick), 11:51. Notre Dame 7–0. Drive: 7 plays, 78 yards, 3:09.
- ND – Justin Yoon 25-yard field goal, 4:26. Notre Dame 10–0. Drive: 13 plays, 42 yards, 6:28.

Second quarter

- ND – Chris Finke 31-yard pass from DeShone Kizer (Justin Yoon kick), 14:53. Notre Dame 17–0. Drive: 7 plays, 79 yards, 2:59.
- VT – Jerod Evans 23-yard run (Joey Slye kick), 11:28. Notre Dame 17–7. Drive: 9 plays, 61 yards, 3:25.
- ND – Miles Boykin 18-yard pass from DeShone Kizer (Justin Yoon kick), 6:00. Notre Dame 24–7. Drive: 7 plays, 60 yards, 2:11.
- VT – Cam Phillips 16-yard pass from Jerod Evans (Joey Slye kick), 1:18. Notre Dame 24–14. Drive: 10 plays, 75 yards, 4:42.

Third quarter

- VT – Steven Peoples 2-yard run (Joey Slye kick), 12:39. Notre Dame 24–21. Drive: 5 plays, 75 yards, 2:21.
- ND – Josh Adams 67-yard run (Justin Yoon kick), 3:49. Notre Dame 31–21. Drive: 4 plays, 78 yards, 1:24.

Fourth quarter

- VT – Joey Slye 23-yard field goal, 13:35. Notre Dame 31–24. Drive: 12 plays, 66 yards, 5:14.
- VT – Bucky Hodges 7-yard pass from Jerod Evans (Joey Slye kick), 9:13. Tie 31–31. Drive: 8 plays, 49 yards, 3:20.
- VT – Joey Slye 20-yard field goal, 4:19. Virginia Tech 34–31. Drive: 10 plays, 51 yards, 4:14.

Top passers

- VT – Jerod Evans – 22/29, 267 yards, 2 TD, INT
- ND – DeShone Kizer – 16/33, 235 yards, 2 TD

Top rushers

- VT – Jerod Evans – 18 rushes, 67 yards, TD
- ND – Josh Adams – 13 rushes, 100 yards, 2 TD

Top receivers

- VT – Isaiah Ford – 7 receptions, 86 yards
- ND – Equanimeous St. Brown – 6 receptions, 90 yards

External videos
- 2016 Virginia Tech at Notre Dame – ACC Network highlights

=== Virginia ===
	1	2	3	4	Total
Cavaliers	0	0	3	7	10
Hokies	7	21	24	0	52

=== Vs. Clemson–ACC Championship Game ===
	1	2	3	4	Total
#19 Hokies	7	7	7	14	35
#3 Tigers	14	7	14	7	42

=== Vs. Arkansas–Belk Bowl ===
	1	2	3	4	Total
Razorbacks	17	7	0	0	24
#18 Hokies	0	0	21	14	35

== Rankings ==
Ranking movements Legend: ██ Increase in ranking ██ Decrease in ranking — = Not ranked RV = Received votes
	Week															
Poll	Pre	1	2	3	4	5	6	7	8	9	10	11	12	13	14	Final
AP	—	—	—	RV	RV	25	17	RV	25	23	18	RV	RV	19	18	16
Coaches	—	—	—	—	RV	RV	19	RV	25	21	22	RV	RV	18	19	16
CFP	Not released									19	14	—	—	23	22	Not released

== Personnel ==
2016 Virginia Tech Hokies football team roster
Players
Coaches
Offense

Pos.	#	Name	Class
WR	1	Isaiah Ford	Jr
QB	4	Jerod Evans	Jr
WR	5	Cam Phillips	Jr
TE	7	Bucky Hodges	Jr
WR	8	Phil Patterson	Fr
QB	9	Brenden Motley	Sr
QB	11	Jack Click	Fr
WR	12	Henri Murphy	So
TE	13	Chris Durkin	So
WR	15	Jaylen Bradshaw	So
RB	16	Coleman Fox	Fr
QB	17	Josh Jackson	Fr
QB	18	Chase Mummau	Fr
WR	27	Dominic Benson	Fr
RB	28	Shai McKenzie	So
WR	30	Jordan Jefferson	Fr
FB	32	Steven Peoples	So
RB	33	Deshawn McClease	Fr
RB	34	Travon McMillian	So
WR	39	Sean Daniel	Fr
WR	41	Kevin Henry	Fr
FB	41	Trey Skeens	Fr
RB	42	Marshawn Williams	So
FB	45	Sam Rogers	Sr
RB	48	D.J. Reid	So
OL	50	Patrick Kearns	Fr
OL	52	Austin Cannon	Fr
OL	56	T.J. Jackson	Fr
OL	57	Wyatt Teller	Jr
OL	58	Colt Pettit	So
OL	61	Kyle Chung	Jr
OL	62	D'Andre Plantin	Fr
OL	63	Daniel Bailey	Fr
OL	64	Eric Gallo	Jr
OL	65	Matt Christ	Fr
OL	66	Billy Ray Mitchell	So
OL	67	Parker Osterloh	Jr
OL	68	Connor Kish	Fr
OL	69	Yosuah Nijman	So
OL	70	Kevin Kish	Fr
OL	71	Jonathan McLaughlin	Sr
OL	72	Augie Conte	Sr
OL	74	Braxton Pfaff	So
OL	75	Zachariah Hoyt	Fr
OL	76	Jarrett Hopple	Fr
OL	77	Demetri Moore	Jr
OL	79	Tyrell Smith	Fr
TE	80	Casey Harman	Fr
WR	81	Samuel Denmark	Fr
TE	82	Xavier Burke	Fr
WR	83	Eric Kumah	Fr
TE	85	Chris Cunningham	Fr
WR	86	C.J. Carroll	So
WR	87	Bodhie Long	Fr
WR	88	Divine Deablo	Fr
WR	89	Devin Wilson	Jr

Defense

Pos.	#	Name	Class
DB	2	Tyree Rodgers	Fr
DB	3	Greg Stroman	Jr
DE	4	Ken Ekanem	Sr
FS	6	Mook Reynolds	So
DT	8	Nigel Williams	Sr
CB	9	Khalil Ladler	Fr
DE	11	Houshun Gaines	Fr
LB	14	Tavante Beckett	Fr
FS	17	Jahque Alleyne	So
LB	18	Raymon Minor	So
DB	19	Chuck Clark	Sr
S	20	Deon Newsome	Jr
DB	21	Reggie Floyd	Fr
ROV	22	Terrell Edmunds	So
FS	23	Der'Woun Greene	Sr
LB	24	Anthony Shegog	Jr
DB	26	Jovonn Quillen	Fr
CB	27	Shawn Payne	So
CB	28	Curtis Williams	Jr
CB	29	DuWayne Johnson	Fr
LB	30	Eron Carter	Fr
CB	31	Brandon Facyson	Jr
CB	35	Erikk Banks	Jr
CB	36	Adonis Alexander	So
LB	37	Johnathan Galante	Sr
ROV	38	Alden Carpenter	Jr
DB	39	Tyrone Thornton	Fr
LB	40	Emmanuel Belmar	Fr
DB	41	John Jennings	So
CB	42	Elisha Boyd	So
DE	43	Seth Dooley	Jr
LB	44	Tre Hubbard	Fr
DE	47	Darius Fullwood	Fr
LB	48	Daniel Griffith	Fr
LB	49	Tremaine Edmunds	So
DL	52	Clay Dean	Fr
LB	53	Trent Young	So
LB	54	Andrew Motuapuaka	Jr
DL	55	Jarrod Hewitt	Fr
LB	56	Sean Huelskamp	Jr
LB	58	Zack Treser	Fr
DT	60	Woody Baron	Sr
LB	61	Joe Koshuta	Fr
DT	90	Dalton Roe	Jr
DT	91	Steve Sobczak	So
LB	92	Matt Reinhart	Fr
DE	94	Trevon Hill	Fr
DE	96	Jimmie Taylor	Fr
DT	97	Tim Settle	Fr
DT	98	Ricky Walker	So
DL	99	Vinny Mihota	So

Special teams

Pos.	#	Name	Class
K	35	Michael Santamaria	So
K	46	Joey Slye	Jr
P	53	Wayne Mutter	Sr
LS	54	Chaska Moon	Fr
LS	87	Colton Taylor	Jr
LS	89	Wright Bynum	Fr
P	90	Mitchell Ludwig	Jr
K	92	Robert Warfel	Sr
P	93	Brian Johnson	Fr

Head coach

- Justin Fuente

Coordinators/assistant coaches

- Bud Foster

Legend

- (C) Team captain
- (S) Suspended
- (I) Ineligible
- Injured
- Redshirt

Roster

=== Coaching staff ===
Name	Position	Seasons at Virginia Tech	Alma mater
Justin Fuente	Head coach	0	Murray State (1999)
Bud Foster	Associate head coach/Defensive coordinator/Inside Linebackers	29	Murray State (1981)
Galen Scott	Assistant head coach/Safeties	0	Illinois State (2001)
Zohn Burden	Running backs	1	VMI (2006)
Brad Cornelsen	Offensive coordinator/Quarterbacks	0	Missouri Southern State (2000)
Brian Mitchell	Cornerbacks	0	BYU (1995)
James Shibest	Special teams coordinator/Tight ends	0	Arkansas (1987)
Vance Vice	Offensive line	0	Oklahoma State (1990)
Holmon Wiggins	Wide receivers	0	New Mexico (2003)
Charley Wiles	Defensive line	20	Murray State (1987)

== Honorary #25 Beamer Jersey ==
At the start of the 2016 season, Head Coach Justin Fuente began a tradition of selecting an outstanding special teams player to wear the #25 jersey in honor of former head coach, Frank Beamer, who wore #25 as a player for Virginia Tech.

The players honored in the 2016 season are:

Game	Opponent	Player
Game 1	Liberty	Steven Peoples
Game 2	Tennessee	Sean Huelskamp
Game 3	Boston College	Tim Settle
Game 4	East Carolina	Greg Stroman
Game 5	North Carolina	Cam Phillips
Game 6	Syracuse	Joey Slye
Game 7	Miami	Anthony Shegog
Game 8	Pittsburgh	Divine Deablo
Game 9	Duke	Chuck Clark
Game 10	Georgia Tech	Adonis Alexander
Game 11	Notre Dame	CJ Carroll
Game 12	Virginia	Sam Rogers
Game 13	Clemson	Woody Baron
Belk Bowl	Arkansas	Terrell Edmunds
