= Travon McMillian =

American football player (born 1996)

Profile
- Position: Running back

Personal information
- Born: February 5, 1996 (age 30); Woodbridge, Virginia, U.S.
- Listed height: 6 ft 0 in (1.83 m)
- Listed weight: 210 lb (95 kg)

Career information
- High school: C.D. Hylton (Woodbridge)
- College: Virginia Tech (2014–2017); Colorado (2018)
- NFL draft: 2019: undrafted

Career history
- Pittsburgh Steelers (2019)*
- * Offseason or practice squad member only

Awards and highlights
- Third-team All-ACC (2015)

Travon Delonté McMillian (born February 5, 1996) is an American former football running back. He played college football for the Virginia Tech Hokies and Colorado Buffaloes.

== Early life ==
McMillian attended C.D. Hylton Senior High School in Woodbridge, Virginia. He played quarterback in high school, totaling 3,009 yards and 37 touchdowns during his senior year. Following his high school career, McMillian committed to play college football at Virginia Polytechnic Institute and State University.

== College career ==
After redshirting in 2014, McMillian switched positions to running back. During his redshirt freshman season in 2015, he earned the role of the Hokies' starting running back, rushing for 1,042 yards on 200 carries for seven touchdowns. The following season, McMillian rushed for 671 yards and seven touchdowns on 145 carries. After rushing for 439 yards on 104 carries in 2017, he transferred to the University of Colorado Boulder. McMillian entered the 2018 season as the team's starting running back. Against New Hampshire, he rushed for a career-high 162 yards and two touchdowns. In his lone season with Colorado, McMillian recorded 201 carries for 1,009 yards and seven touchdowns.

=== Statistics ===
College statistics
Season	Team	Games	Rushing				Receiving			
Season	Team	GP	Att	Yards	Avg	TD	Rec	Yards	Avg	TD
2014	Virginia Tech	Redshirted (redshirt)								
2015	Virginia Tech	13	200	1,042	5.2	7	12	64	5.3	1
2016	Virginia Tech	14	145	671	4.6	7	11	120	10.9	3
2017	Virginia Tech	12	104	439	4.2	2	12	173	14.4	3
2018	Colorado	12	201	1,009	5.0	7	14	118	8.4	3
Career		51	650	3,161	4.9	23	49	475	9.7	8

== Professional career ==
After going undrafted in the 2019 NFL draft, McMillian signed with the Pittsburgh Steelers as an undrafted free agent. On August 31, 2019, he was waived by the Steelers.
