= 2016 Arkansas Razorbacks football team =

American college football season

2016 Arkansas Razorbacks football

Belk Bowl, L 24–35 vs. Virginia Tech
- Conference: Southeastern Conference
- Western Division
- Record: 7–6 (3–5 SEC)
- Head coach: Bret Bielema (4th season)
- Offensive coordinator: Dan Enos (2nd season)
- Offensive scheme: Pro-style
- Defensive coordinator: Robb Smith (3rd season)
- Base defense: 4–3
- Captains: Brooks Ellis; Dan Skipper; Kody Walker; Deatrich Wise Jr.
- Home stadium: Donald W. Reynolds Razorback Stadium; War Memorial Stadium

2016 Southeastern Conference football standings
	Conf.			Overall
Team	W		L	W		L
Eastern Division
No. 14 Florida x	6	–	2	9	–	4
No. 22 Tennessee	4	–	4	9	–	4
Georgia	4	–	4	8	–	5
Kentucky	4	–	4	7	–	6
South Carolina	3	–	5	6	–	7
Vanderbilt	3	–	5	6	–	7
Missouri*	2	–	6	4	–	8
Western Division
No. 2 Alabama x$^	8	–	0	14	–	1
No. 24 Auburn	5	–	3	8	–	5
No. 13 LSU	5	–	3	8	–	4
Texas A&M	4	–	4	8	–	5
Arkansas	3	–	5	7	–	6
Mississippi State	3	–	5	6	–	7
Ole Miss*	2	–	6	5	–	7
Championship: Alabama 54, Florida 16
^ – College Football Playoff participant; $ – Conference champion; x – Division champion/co-champions; * Ole Miss and Missouri vacated all wins due to NCAA violations.; Rankings from AP Poll

The 2016 Arkansas Razorbacks football team represented the University of Arkansas as a member of the Southeastern Conference (SEC) during the 2016 NCAA Division I FBS football season. Led by fourth-year head coach Bret Bielema, the Razorbacks compiled an overall record of 7–6 with a mark of 3–5 in conference play, tying for fifth place in the SEC's Western Division. Arkansas was invited to the Belk Bowl, where the Razorbackslost to Virginia Tech after blowing a 24–0 halftime lead. The team played six home games at Donald W. Reynolds Razorback Stadium in Fayetteville, Arkansas and one home game at War Memorial Stadium in Little Rock, Arkansas.

== Schedule ==
Arkansas announced its 2016 football schedule on October 29, 2015. The schedule consisted of seven home games, four away games, and one neutral site game in the regular season.

Date	Time	Opponent	Rank	Site	TV	Result	Attendance
September 3	3:00 p.m.	Louisiana Tech*		Donald W. Reynolds Razorback Stadium; Fayetteville, AR	SECN	W 21–20	69,132
September 10	6:00 p.m.	at No. 15 TCU*		Amon G. Carter Stadium; Fort Worth, TX	ESPN	W 41–38 ^{2OT}	48,091
September 17	6:30 p.m.	Texas State*	No. 24	Donald W. Reynolds Razorback Stadium; Fayetteville, AR	SECN	W 42–3	72,114
September 24	8:00 p.m.	vs. No. 10 Texas A&M	No. 17	AT&T Stadium; Arlington, TX (rivalry)	ESPN	L 24–45	67,751
October 1	11:00 a.m.	Alcorn State*	No. 20	War Memorial Stadium; Little Rock, AR	SECN	W 52–10	46,988
October 8	6:00 p.m.	No. 1 Alabama	No. 16	Donald W. Reynolds Razorback Stadium; Fayetteville, AR	ESPN	L 30–49	75,459
October 15	6:00 p.m.	No. 12 Ole Miss^{†}	No. 22	Donald W. Reynolds Razorback Stadium; Fayetteville, AR (rivalry)	ESPN	W 34–30	73,786
October 22	5:00 p.m.	at No. 21 Auburn	No. 17	Jordan–Hare Stadium; Auburn, AL	ESPN	L 3–56	87,451
November 5	2:30 p.m.	No. 11 Florida		Donald W. Reynolds Razorback Stadium; Fayetteville, AR (SEC Nation)	CBS	W 31–10	74,432
November 12	6:00 p.m.	No. 24 LSU	No. 25	Donald W. Reynolds Razorback Stadium; Fayetteville, AR (rivalry)	ESPN	L 10–38	75,156
November 19	6:00 p.m.	at Mississippi State		Davis Wade Stadium; Starkville, MS	ESPNU	W 58–42	58,538
November 25	1:30 p.m.	at Missouri		Faurot Field; Columbia, MO (Battle Line Rivalry)	CBS	L 24–28	51,043
December 29	4:30 p.m.	vs. No. 22 Virginia Tech*		Bank of America Stadium; Charlotte, NC (Belk Bowl)	ESPN	L 24–35	46,902
*Non-conference game; ^{†}Homecoming; Rankings from AP Poll and CFP Rankings after November 1 released prior to game; All times are in Central time

== Rankings ==
Ranking movements Legend: ██ Increase in ranking ██ Decrease in ranking — = Not ranked RV = Received votes
	Week															
Poll	Pre	1	2	3	4	5	6	7	8	9	10	11	12	13	14	Final
AP	RV	—	24	17	20	16	22	17	RV	RV	RV	RV	RV	—	—	—
Coaches	RV	RV	24	18	22	17	22	17	RV	RV	RV	RV	RV	—	—	RV
CFP	Not released									—	—	25	—	—	—	Not released

== Game summaries ==
=== Louisiana Tech ===
Louisiana Tech Bulldogs at Arkansas Razorbacks

Quarter	1	2	3	4	Total
Bulldogs	7	7	6	0	20
Razorbacks	7	7	0	7	21

at Donald W. Reynolds Razorback Stadium • Fayetteville, AR

- Date: September 3, 2016
- Game time: 3:00 p.m. CT
- Game weather: 79 °F (26 °C) • Wind ESE 9 mph (14 km/h)mph • Sunny
- Game attendance: 69,132
- Referee: John McDaid, Tom Quick, Randall Kizer, David Oliver, John Wright, Phil Davenport, Chris Conley, Brian Davis
- TV announcers (SEC Network): Beth Mowins (play-by-play), Anthony Becht (color), Rocky Boiman (sideline)
- Source

Game information

First Quarter

- (9:11) LTU TD: J'Mar Smith 9-yard rush (Jonathan Barnes PAT).
- (2:52) ARK TD: Rawleigh Williams III 6-yard rush (Cole Hedlund PAT).

Second Quarter

- (7:01) ARK TD: Austin Allen 13-yard pass to Jared Cornelius (Cole Hedlund PAT).
- (1:40) LTU TD: Jarred Craft 1-yard rush (Jonathan Barnes PAT).

Third Quarter

- (11:22) LTU FG: Jonathan Barnes 43-yard field goal.
- (5:02) LTU FG: Jonathan Barnes 20-yard field goal.

Fourth Quarter

- (6:37) ARK TD: Austin Allen 4-yard pass to Jeremy Sprinkle (Cole Hedlund PAT).

Top Passers

- LTU – J'Mar Smith: 19/31, 212 yds, 1 INT
- ARK – Austin Allen: 20/29, 191 yds, 2 TD, 2 INT

Top Rushers

- LTU – Jarred Craft: 12 att, 68 yds, 1 TD
- ARK – Rawleigh Williams III: 24 att, 96 yds, 1 TD

Top Receiving

- LTU – Trent Taylor: 8 rec, 78 yds
- ARK – Keon Hatcher: 6 rec, 86 yds

=== At TCU ===
Arkansas Razorbacks at No. 15 TCU Horned Frogs

Quarter	1	2	3	4	OT	2OT	Total
Razorbacks	3	10	7	8	7	6	41
No. 15 Horned Frogs	0	0	7	21	7	3	38

at Amon G. Carter Stadium • Fort Worth, TX

- Date: September 10, 2016
- Game time: 6:00 p.m. CT
- Game weather: 81 °F (27 °C) • Wind N 17 mph (27 km/h)mph • Partly Cloudy
- Game attendance: 48,091
- Referee: Marc Curles, Brent Sowell, Gus Morris, Michael Shirey, Scott Vaughn, Wes Booker, Chuck Russ, Wayne Winkler
- TV announcers (ESPN): Joe Tessitore (play-by-play), Todd Blackledge (color), Holly Rowe (sideline)
- Source

Game information

First Quarter

- (11:47) ARK FG: Cole Hedlund 38-yard field goal.

Second Quarter

- (12:12) ARK FG: Cole Hedlund 27-yard field goal.
- (10:09) ARK TD: Brooks Ellis 45-yard interception return (Cole Hedlund PAT).

Third Quarter

- (11:58) TCU TD: Kyle Hicks 9-yard rush (Ryan Graf PAT).
- (4:27) ARK TD: Austin Allen 13-yard pass to Drew Morgan (Cole Hedlund PAT).

Fourth Quarter

- (9:44) TCU TD: Kenny Hill 1-yard rush (Ryan Graf PAT).
- (7:15) TCU TD: Kyle Hicks 7-yard rush (Ryan Graf PAT).
- (2:05) TCU TD: Kenny Hill 5-yard rush (Ryan Graf PAT).
- (1:03) ARK TD: Austin Allen 16-yard pass to Keon Hatcher (2-pt. good)

Overtime

- (OT) ARK TD: Austin Allen 19-yard pass to Jeremy Sprinkle (Cole Hedlund PAT good).
- (OT) TCU TD: Kenny Hill 13-yard pass to Taj Williams (Ryan Graf PAT good).

2nd Overtime

- (2OT) TCU FG: Ryan Graf 37-yard field goal.
- (2OT) ARK TD: Austin Allen 5-yard rush (No PAT).

Top Passers

- ARK – Austin Allen: 17/29, 223 yds, 3 TD
- TCU – Kenny Hill: 36/56, 377 yds, 1 TD, 1 INT

Top Rushers

- ARK – Rawleigh Williams III: 28 att, 137 yds
- TCU – Kenny Hill: 15 att, 93 yds, 2 TD

Top Receiving

- ARK – Drew Morgan: 7 rec, 93 yds, 1 TD
- TCU – KaVontae Turpin: 4 rec, 136 yds

=== Texas State ===
Texas State Bobcats at No. 24 Arkansas Razorbacks

Quarter	1	2	3	4	Total
Bobcats	0	0	3	0	3
No. 24 Razorbacks	14	21	7	0	42

at Donald W. Reynolds Razorback Stadium • Fayetteville, AR

- Date: September 17, 2016
- Game time: 6:30 p.m. CT
- Game weather: 79 °F (26 °C), Wind calm, Scattered clouds (Shortened 4th qtr. due to weather)
- Game attendance: 72,114
- Referee: Brad Rogers, Walt Hill, John Langlois, Kirk Lewis, Michael Watson, Grant Jackson, Chris Jamison, Kevin Vicknair
- TV announcers (SEC Network): Roy Philpott (play-by-play), Clint Stoerner (color), Dawn Davenport (sideline)
- Source

Game information

First Quarter

- (9:15) ARK TD: Austin Allen 9-yard pass to Keon Hatcher (Cole Hedlund PAT).
- (4:36) ARK TD: Kody Walker 1-yard rush (Cole Hedlund PAT).

Second Quarter

- (11:31) ARK TD: Ryan Pulley 25-yard interception return (Cole Hedlund PAT).
- (5:22) ARK TD: Austin Allen 10-yard pass to Jeremy Sprinkle (Cole Hedlund PAT).
- (0:44) ARK TD: Rawleigh Williams III 1-yard rush (Cole Hedlund PAT).

Third Quarter

- (10:03) TXST FG: James Sherman 39-yard field goal.
- (1:02) ARK TD: Rawleigh Williams III 15-yard rush (Cole Hedlund PAT).

Fourth Quarter

No Scoring

Top Passers

- TXST – Tyler Jones: 11/26, 83 yds, 1 INT
- ARK – Austin Allen: 16/21, 241 yds, 2 TD

Top Rushers

- TXST – Stedman Mayberry: 10 att, 34 yds, 1 TD
- ARK – Rawleigh Williams III: 19 att, 121 yds, 2 TD

Top Receiving

- TXST – Elijah King: 1 rec, 24 yds
- ARK – Keon Hatcher: 3 rec, 96 yds, 1 TD

=== vs Texas A&M ===
No. 17 Arkansas Razorbacks vs No. 10 Texas A&M Aggies

Quarter	1	2	3	4	Total
No. 17 Razorbacks	7	10	0	7	24
No. 10 Aggies	0	17	7	21	45

at AT&T Stadium • Arlington, TX

- Date: September 24, 2016
- Game time: 8:00 p.m. CT
- Game weather: N/A (Game played indoors)
- Game attendance: 67,751
- Referee: James Carter, Russ Pulley, Johnny Crawford, Tim Beard, Scott Vaughn, Jim Taylor, Anthony Jeffrie, Gary Beasley
- TV announcers (ESPN): Joe Tessitore (play-by-play), Todd Blackledge (color), Holly Rowe (sideline)
- Source

Game information

First Quarter

- (12:29) ARK TD: Austin Allen 15-yard pass to Keon Hatcher (Cole Hedlund PAT).

Second Quarter

- (14:52) A&M TD: Trevor Knight 42-yard rush (Daniel LaCamera PAT).
- (9:59) ARK FG: Cole Hedlund 20-yard field goal.
- (5:00) A&M FG: Daniel LaCamera 48-yard field goal.
- (1:31) ARK TD: Rawleigh Williams III 8-yard rush (Cole Hedlund PAT).
- (0:13) A&M TD: Trevor Knight 48-yard rush (Daniel LaCamera PAT).

Third Quarter

- (1:33) A&M TD: Trevor Knight 92-yard pass to Josh Reynolds (Daniel LaCamera PAT).

Fourth Quarter

- (11:54) A&M TD: Trayveon Williams 33-yard rush (Daniel LaCamera PAT).
- (10:25) A&M TD: Trevor Knight 9-yard pass to Christian Kirk (Daniel LaCamera PAT).
- (6:21) ARK TD: Austin Allen 5-yard pass to Jared Cornelius (Cole Hedlund PAT).
- (4:57) A&M TD: Trayveon Williams 22-yard rush (Daniel LaCamera PAT).

Top Passers

- ARK – Austin Allen: 28/42, 371 yds, 2 TD
- A&M – Trevor Knight: 12/22, 225 yds, 2 TD

Top Rushers

- ARK – Rawleigh Williams III: 17 att, 79 yds, 1 TD
- A&M – Trevor Knight: 10 att, 157 yds, 2 TD

Top Receiving

- ARK – Jared Cornelius: 7 rec, 126 yds, 1 TD
- A&M – Josh Reynolds: 4 rec, 141 yds, 1 TD

=== Alcorn State ===
Alcorn State Braves at No. 20 Arkansas Razorbacks

Quarter	1	2	3	4	Total
Braves	0	7	3	0	10
No. 20 Razorbacks	24	0	14	14	52

at War Memorial Stadium • Little Rock, AR

- Date: October 1, 2016
- Game time: 11:00 a.m. CT
- Game weather: 74 °F (23 °C) • Wind calm • Clear skies
- Game attendance: 46,988
- Referee: Matt Austin, Rodney Lawary, Tim Sistrunk, Michael Taylor, Michael Watson, Glen Fucik, Bobby Moreau, Wayne Winkler
- TV announcers (SEC Network): Mike Morgan (play-by-play), Clint Stoerner (color), Kevin Weidl (sideline)
- Source

Game information

First Quarter

- (12:11) ARK FG: Cole Hedlund 25-yard field goal.
- (9:03) ARK TD: Austin Allen 29-yard pass to Jared Cornelius (Cole Hedlund PAT).
- (7:22) ARK TD: Devwah Whaley 75-yard rush (Cole Hedlund PAT).
- (0:17) ARK TD: Austin Allen 35-yard pass to Jared Cornelius (Cole Hedlund PAT).

Second Quarter

- (10:44) ALC TD: Noah Johnson 12-yard rush (Haiden McCraney PAT).

Third Quarter

- (9:42) ARK TD: Henre' Toliver 70-yard interception return (Cole Hedlund PAT).
- (5:54) ARK TD: Cody Hollister 26-yard rush (Cole Hedlund PAT).
- (3:40) ALC FG: Haiden McCraney 43-yard field goal.

Fourth Quarter

- (13:49) ARK TD: Austin Allen 10-yard pass to LaMichael Pettway (Cole Hedlund PAT).
- (6:43) ARK TD: T.J. Hammonds 5-yard rush (Cole Hudlund PAT).

Top Passers

- ALC - Noah Johnson: 13/19, 158 yds, 2 INT
- ARK - Austin Allen: 13/18, 206 yds, 3 TD

Top Rushers

- ALC - Arron Baker: 13 att, 85 yds
- ARK - Devwah Whaley: 9 att, 135 yds, 1 TD

Top Receiving

- ALC - Jaborian McKenzie: 7 rec, 88 yds
- ARK - Jared Cornelius: 4 rec, 106 yds, 2 TD

=== Alabama ===
No. 1 Alabama Crimson Tide at No. 16 Arkansas Razorbacks

Quarter	1	2	3	4	Total
No. 1 Crimson Tide	14	21	7	7	49
No. 16 Razorbacks	7	10	7	6	30

at Donald W. Reynolds Razorback Stadium • Fayetteville, AR

- Date: October 8, 2016
- Game time: 6:00 p.m.
- Game weather: 66 °F (19 °C) • Wind NNE 5 mph (8.0 km/h)mph • Clear skies
- Game attendance: 75,459
- Referee: Matt Loeffler, Stan Weihe, Gus Morris, Michael Shirey, Tony Josselyn, Bobby Ables, Jesse Dupuy, Chris Snead
- TV announcers (ESPN): Joe Tessitore (play-by-play), Todd Blackledge (color), Holly Rowe (sideline)
- Source

Game information

First Quarter

- (7:27) ALA TD: Jalen Hurts 5-yard rush (Adam Griffith PAT).
- (5:25) ALA TD: Jalen Hurts 6-yard rush (Adam Griffith PAT).
- (1:54) ARK TD: Austin Allen 24-yard pass to Jeremy Sprinkle (Adam McFain PAT).

Second Quarter

- (12:25) ALA TD: Tim Williams 23-yard fumble return (Adam Griffith PAT).
- (8:53) ALA TD: Jalen Hurts 56-yard pass to Damien Harris (Adam Griffith PAT).
- (3:00) ARK FG: Adam McFain 25-yard field goal.
- (1:25) ALA TD: Bo Scarborough 21-yard rush (Adam Griffith PAT).
- (0:29) ARK TD: Austin Allen 16-yard pass to Keon Hatcher (Adam McFain PAT).

Third Quarter

- (11:10) ALA TD: Jalen Hurts 4-yard pass to Calvin Ridley (Adam Griffith PAT).
- (3:57) ARK TD: Austin Allen 10-yard pass to Keon Hatcher (Adam McFain PAT).

Fourth Quarter

- (10:18) ALA TD: Minkah Fitzpatrick 100-yard interception return (Adam Griffith PAT).
- (3:18) ARK TD: Rawleigh Williams III 3-yard rush (2-pt. no good).

Top Passers

- ALA - Jalen Hurts: 13/17, 253 yds, 2 TD, 1 INT
- ARK - Austin Allen: 25/48, 400 yds, 3 TD, 3 INT

Top Rushers

- ALA - Damien Harris: 13 att, 122 yds
- ARK - Rawleigh Williams III: 12 att, 46 yds, 1 TD

Top Receiving

- ALA - ArDarius Stewart: 5 rec, 120 yds
- ARK - Jared Cornelius: 5 rec, 146 yds

=== Ole Miss ===
No. 12 Ole Miss Rebels at No. 22 Arkansas Razorbacks

Quarter	1	2	3	4	Total
No. 12 Rebels	6	14	0	10	30
No. 22 Razorbacks	14	6	7	7	34

at Donald W. Reynolds Razorback Stadium • Fayetteville, AR

- Date: October 15, 2016
- Game time: 6:00 p.m.
- Game weather: 78 °F (26 °C) • Wind S 14 mph (23 km/h)mph • Scattered clouds
- Game attendance: 73,786
- Referee: Marc Curles, Johnny Hibbett, Randall Kizer, Chris Conway, Scott Vaughn, Wes Booker, Richard Rooker, Wayne Winkler
- TV announcers (ESPN): Joe Tessitore (play-by-play), Todd Blackledge (color), Holly Rowe (sideline)
- Source

Game information

First Quarter

- (10:33) ARK TD: Austin Allen 51-yard pass to Dominique Reed (Adam McFain PAT).
- (7:26) MISS TD: Chad Kelly 13-yard pass to Evan Engram (PAT no good).
- (6:04) ARK TD: Austin Allen 13-yard pass to Drew Morgan (Adam McFain PAT).

Second Quarter

- (14:19) ARK FG: Adam McFain 43-yard field goal.
- (11:50) MISS TD: Akeem Judd 2-yard rush (Gary Wunderlich PAT).
- (5:25) ARK FG: Adam McFain 36-yard field goal.
- (1:24) MISS TD: Chad Kelly 8-yard rush (Gary Wunderlich PAT).

Third Quarter

- (3:29) ARK TD: Austin Allen 2-yard pass to Rawleigh Williams III (Adam McFain PAT).

Fourth Quarter

- (14:49) MISS FG: Gary Wunderlich 33-yard field goal.
- (9:00) MISS TD: Chad Kelly 17-yard rush (Gary Wunderlich PAT).
- (2:24) ARK TD: Jared Cornelius 6-yard rush (Adam McFain PAT).

Top Passers

- MISS - Chad Kelly: 18/39, 253 yds, 1 TD, 1 INT
- ARK - Austin Allen: 19/32, 229 yds, 3 TD, 1 INT

Top Rushers

- MISS - Chad Kelly: 14 att, 89 yds, 2 TD
- ARK - Rawleigh Williams III: 27 yds, 180 yds

Top Receiving

- MISS - Evan Engram: 7 rec, 111 yds, 1 TD
- ARK - Dominique Reed: 3 rec, 65 yds, 1 TD

=== At Auburn ===
No. 17 Arkansas Razorbacks at No. 21 Auburn Tigers

Quarter	1	2	3	4	Total
No. 17 Razorbacks	0	3	0	0	3
No. 21 Tigers	21	7	14	14	56

at Jordan–Hare Stadium • Auburn, AL

- Date: October 22, 2016
- Game time: 5:00 p.m.
- Game weather: 67 °F (19 °C) • Wind NW 10 mph (16 km/h)mph • Sunny
- Game attendance: 87,451
- Referee: Ken Williamson, Wally Hough, Lane Thomas, Mickey Bryson, Grantis Bell, Greg Thomas, Rob Skelton
- TV announcers (ESPN): Joe Tessitore (play-by-play), Todd Blackledge (color), Holly Rowe (sideline)
- Source

Game information

First Quarter

- (11:11) AUB TD: Eli Stove 78-yard rush (Daniel Carlson PAT).
- (3:06) AUB TD: Kamryn Pettway 9-yard rush (Daniel Carlson PAT).
- (1:04) AUB TD: Stanton Truitt 20-yard rush (Daniel Carlson PAT).

Second Quarter

- (1:38) AUB TD: Sean White 45-yard pass to Stanton Truitt (Daniel Carlson PAT).
- (0:04) ARK FG: Adam McFain 54-yard field goal.

Third Quarter

- (6:10) AUB TD: Sean White 1-yard rush (Daniel Carlson PAT).
- (0:50) AUB TD: Kamryn Pettway 23-yard rush (Daniel Carlson PAT).

Fourth Quarter

- (12:33) AUB TD: Stanton Truitt 31-yard rush (Daniel Carlson PAT).
- (4:39) AUB TD: Kam Martin 51-yard rush (Daniel Carlson PAT).

Top Passers

- AUB - Sean White: 6/11, 77 yds, 1 TD
- ARK - Austin Allen: 17/30, 187 yds, 1 INT

Top Rushers

- AUB - Kamryn Pettway: 27 att, 192 yds, 2 TD
- ARK - Rawleigh Williams III: 13 att, 22 yds

Top Receiving

- AUB - Stanton Truitt: 1 rec, 45 yds, 1 TD
- ARK - Keon Hatcher: 7 rec, 81 yds

=== Florida ===
No. 14 Florida Gators at Arkansas Razorbacks

Quarter	1	2	3	4	Total
No. 14 Gators	7	0	0	3	10
Razorbacks	14	7	0	10	31

at Donald W. Reynolds Razorback Stadium • Fayetteville, AR

- Date: November 5, 2016
- Game time: 2:30 p.m.
- Game weather: 66 °F (19 °C) • Wind E 3 mph (4.8 km/h)mph • Scattered clouds
- Game attendance: 74,432
- Referee: David Smith, Tom Quick, Gus Morris, Michael Shirey, Tony Josselyn, Bobby Ables, Jesse Dupuy, Chris Snead
- TV announcers (CBS): Brad Nessler (play-by-play), Aaron Taylor (color), John Schriffen (sideline)
- Source

Game information

First Quarter

- (12:20) ARK TD: Santos Ramirez 24-yard interception return (Adam McFain PAT).
- (5:56) ARK TD: Rawleigh Williams III 6-yard rush (Adam McFain PAT).
- (2:44) FLA TD: Duke Dawson 37-yard interception return (Eddy Pineiro PAT).

Second Quarter

- (0:20) ARK TD: Austin Allen 7-yard pass to Drew Morgan (Adam McFain PAT).

Third Quarter

No scoring

Fourth Quarter

- (9:14) ARK FG: Adam McFain 36-yard field goal.
- (6:46) FLA FG: Eddy Pineiro 50-yard field goal.
- (5:40) ARK TD: Rawleigh Williams 41-yard rush (Adam McFain PAT).

Top Passers

- FLA - Luke del Rio: 19/37, 229 yds, 2 INT
- ARK - Austin Allen: 15/26, 243 yds, 1 TD, 1 INT

Top Rushers

- FLA - Mark Thompson: 3 att, 19 yds
- ARK - Rawleigh Williams III: 26 att, 148 yds, 2 TD

Top Receiving

- FLA - Antonio Callaway: 4 rec, 44 yds
- ARK - Drew Morgan: 7 rec, 95 yds, 1 TD

=== LSU ===
No. 19 LSU Tigers at Arkansas Razorbacks

Quarter	1	2	3	4	Total
No. 19 Tigers	7	14	7	10	38
Razorbacks	0	7	3	0	10

at Donald W. Reynolds Razorback Stadium • Fayetteville, AR

- Date: November 12, 2016
- Game time: 6:00 p.m.
- Game weather: 54 °F (12 °C) • Wind calm • Clear skies
- Game attendance: 75,156
- Referee: John McDaid, Johnny Hibbett, Jay Vines, David Oliver, John Wright, Phil Davenport, Chris Conley, Brian Davis
- TV announcers (ESPN): Dave Pasch (play-by-play), Greg McElroy (color), Tom Luginbill (sideline)
- Source

Game information

First Quarter

- (8:58) LSU TD: Leonard Fournette 5-yard rush (Cody Delahoussaye PAT).

Second Quarter

- (14:54) LSU TD: Leonard Fournette 7-yard rush (Cody Delahoussaye PAT).
- (10:19) LSU TD: Derrius Guice 3-yard rush (Cody Delahoussaye PAT).
- (5:52) ARK TD: Austin Allen 44-yard pass to Dominique Reed (Adam McFain PAT).

Third Quarter

- (10:37) ARK FG: Adam McFain 24-yard field goal.
- (6:59) LSU TD: Leonard Fournette 3-yard rush (Cody Delahoussaye PAT).

Fourth Quarter

- (7:57) LSU FG: Cody Delahoussaye 19-yard field goal.
- (6:04) LSU TD: Derrius Guice 96-yard rush (Cody Delahoussaye PAT).

Top Passers

- LSU - Danny Etling: 10/16, 157 yds
- ARK - Austin Allen: 15/31, 210 yds, 1 TD, 2 INT

Top Rushers

- LSU - Derrius Guice: 21 att, 252 yds, 2 TD
- ARK - Devwah Whaley: 7 att, 52 yds

Top Receiving

- LSU - Malachi Dupre: 2 rec, 60 yds
- ARK - Dominique Reed: 2 rec, 58 yds, 1 TD

=== At Mississippi State ===
Arkansas Razorbacks at Mississippi State Bulldogs

Quarter	1	2	3	4	Total
Razorbacks	14	24	6	14	58
Bulldogs	14	0	14	14	42

at Davis Wade Stadium • Starkville, MS

- Date: November 19, 2016
- Game time: 6:00 p.m.
- Game weather: 48 °F (9 °C) • Wind NNW 5 mph (8.0 km/h)mph • Clear skies
- Game attendance: 58,538
- Referee: Ken Williamson, Brent Sowell, Lane Thomas, Mickey Bryson, Grantis Bell, Jeff Batts, Rob Skelton, Tra Boger
- TV announcers (ESPNU): Clay Matvick (play-by-play), Dusty Dvoracek (color), Alex Corddry (sideline)
- Source

Game information

First Quarter

- (14:12) ARK TD: Rawleigh Williams III 72-yard rush (Adam McFain PAT).
- (13:18) MSST TD: Nick Fitzgerald 58-yard rush (Westin Graves PAT).
- (7:29) ARK TD: Rawleigh Williams III 42-yard rush (Adam McFain PAT).
- (1:25) MSST TD: Nick Fitzgerald 18-yard rush (Westin Graves PAT).

Second Quarter

- (12:29) ARK TD: Austin Allen 5-yard pass to Keon Hatcher (Adam McFain PAT).
- (8:58) ARK FG: Adam McFain 34-yard field goal.
- (5:53) ARK TD: Rawleigh Williams III 7-yard rush (Adam McFain PAT).
- (1:32) ARK TD: Rawleigh Williams III 33-yard rush (Adam McFain PAT).

Third Quarter

- (12:15) MSST TD: Nick Fitzgerald 40-yard pass to Fred Ross (Westin Graves PAT).
- (5:03) ARK TD: Rawleigh Williams III 1-yard pass to Austin Cantrell (PAT no good).
- (2:52) MSST TD: Nick Fitzgerald 2-yard rush (Westin Graves PAT).

Fourth Quarter

- (14:04) ARK TD: Austin Allen 10-yard pass to Keon Hatcher (2-pt. good).
- (11:12) MSST TD: Nick Fitzgerald 1-yard rush (2-pt. good).
- (5:29) ARK TD: Devwah Whaley 4-yard rush (2-pt. no good).
- (2:15) MSST TD: Nick Fitzgerald 15-yard pass to Fred Ross (2-pt. no good).

Top Passers

- ARK - Austin Allen: 18/25, 303 yds, 2 TD
- MSST - Nick Fitzgerald: 23/33, 328 yds, 2 TD

Top Rushers

- ARK - Rawleigh Williams III: 16 att, 205 yds, 4 TD
- MSST - Nick Fitzgerald: 17 att, 131 yds, 4 TD

Top Receiving

- ARK - Drew Morgan: 6 rec, 91 yds
- MSST - Fred Ross: 10 rec, 171 yds, 2 TD

=== At Missouri ===
Arkansas Razorbacks at Missouri Tigers

Quarter	1	2	3	4	Total
Razorbacks	14	10	0	0	24
Tigers	7	0	14	7	28

at Faurot Field • Columbia, MO

- Date: November 25, 2016
- Game time: 1:30 p.m.
- Game weather: 42 °F (6 °C) • Wind NW 5 mph (8.0 km/h)mph • Overcast
- Game attendance: 51,043
- Referee: Brad Rogers, Johnny Hibbett, John Langlois, Kirk Lewis, Michael Watson, Grant Jackson, Chuck Russ, Kevin Vicknair
- TV announcers (CBS): Brad Nessler (play-by-play), Gary Danielson (color), John Schriffen (sideline)
- Source

Game information

First Quarter

- (14:05) ARK TD: Rawleigh Williams III 1-yard rush (Adam McFain PAT).
- (9:44) MIZZ TD: Ish Witter 8-yard rush (Tucker McCann PAT).
- (4:13) ARK TD: Devwah Whaley 30-yard rush (Adam McFain PAT).

Second Quarter

- (8:05) ARK TD: Austin Allen 5-yard pass to Austin Cantrell (Adam McFain PAT).
- (1:08) ARK FG: Adam McFain 33-yard field goal.

Third Quarter

- (11:53) MIZZ TD: Nate Strong 2-yard rush (Tucker McCann PAT).
- (2:07) MIZZ TD: Drew Lock 67-yard pass to Johnathon Johnson (Tucker McCann PAT).

Fourth Quarter

- (12:48) MIZZ TD: Nate Strong 1-yard rush (Tucker McCann PAT).

Top Passers

- ARK - Austin Allen: 24/39, 348 yds, 1 TD, 2 INT
- MIZZ - Drew Lock: 16/26, 268 yds, 1 TD

Top Rushers

- ARK - Rawleigh Williams III: 25 att, 117 yds, 1 TD
- MIZZ - Johnathan Johnson: 2 att, 81 yds

Top Receiving

- ARK - Keon Hatcher: 3 rec, 106 yds
- MIZZ - J'Mon Moore: 6 rec, 135 yds

=== vs Virginia Tech (Belk Bowl) ===
Arkansas Razorbacks vs No. 18 Virginia Tech Hokies (2016 Belk Bowl)

Quarter	1	2	3	4	Total
Razorbacks	17	7	0	0	24
No. 18 Hokies	0	0	21	14	35

at Bank of America Stadium • Charlotte, NC

- Date: December 29, 2016
- Game time: 4:30 p.m.
- TV announcers (ESPN): Mike Patrick (play-by-play), Ed Cunningham (color), Dr. Jerry Punch (sideline)
- Source

Game information

First Quarter

- (13:23) ARK FG: Cole Hedlund 38-yard field goal.
- (2:22) ARK TD: Austin Allen 1-yard rush (Cole Hedlund PAT).
- (0:21) ARK TD: Austin Allen 28-yard pass to Cheyenne O'Grady (Cole Hedlund PAT).

Second Quarter

- (10:05) ARK TD: Austin Allen 12-yard pass to Keon Hatcher (Cole Hedlund PAT).

Third Quarter

- (13:27) VT TD: Jerod Evans 4-yard rush (Joey Slye PAT).
- (4:18) VT TD: Jerod Evans 3-yard pass to Sam Rogers (Joey Slye PAT).
- (4:00) VT TD: Jerod Evans 5-yard pass to Chris Cunningham (Joey Slye PAT).

Fourth Quarter

- (12:03) VT TD: Travon McMillian 6-yard rush (Joey Slye PAT).
- (6:41) VT TD: Jerod Evans 1-yard rush (Joey Slye PAT).

Top Passers

- ARK – Austin Allen: 18/31, 278 yds, 2 TD, 3 INT
- VT – Jerod Evans: 21/33, 243 yds, 2 TD, 1 INT

Top Rushers

- ARK – Rawleigh Williams III: 12 car, 34 yds
- VT – Jerod Evans: 22 car, 87 yds, 2 TD

Top Receiving

- ARK – Keon Hatcher: 6 rec, 105 yds
- VT – Cam Phillips: 6 rec, 115 yds
