= Jerod Evans =

American football player (born 1994)

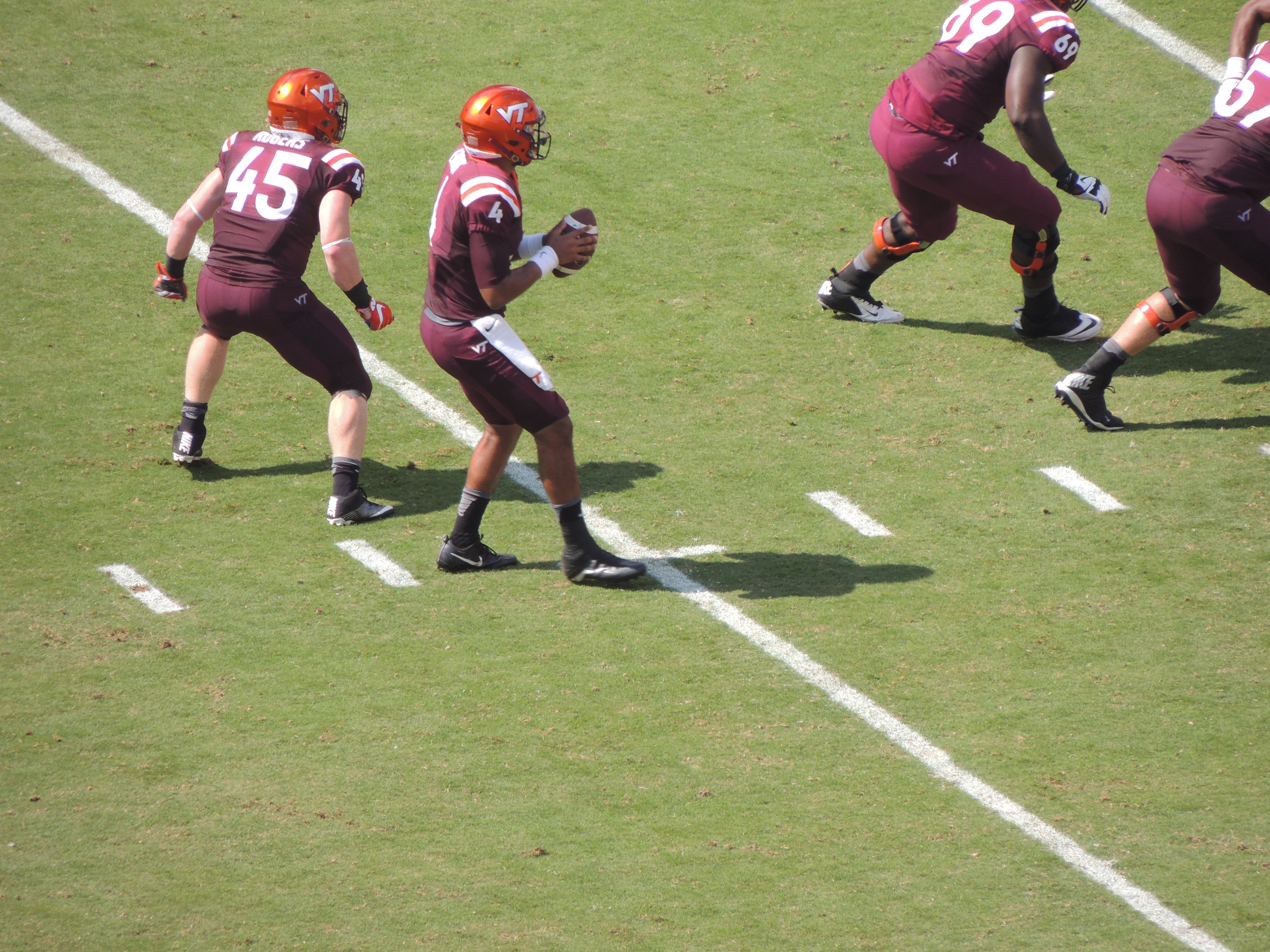
- Evans (4) with Virginia Tech in 2016

Profile
- Position: Quarterback

Personal information
- Born: January 16, 1994 (age 32); Dallas, Texas, U.S.
- Listed height: 6 ft 3 in (1.91 m)
- Listed weight: 232 lb (105 kg)

Career information
- High school: Mansfield (TX)
- College: Virginia Tech
- NFL draft: 2017: undrafted

Career history
- Philadelphia Eagles (2017)*; Green Bay Packers (2017)*; Washington Valor (2018); Baltimore Brigade (2019); Washington Valor (2019); Tokyo Gas Creators (2021); Frisco Fighters (2022); Carolina Cobras (2022); Vegas Knight Hawks (2022); Northern Arizona Wranglers (2022); Fehérvár Enthroners (2023); Dallas Bulls (2026)
- * Offseason or practice squad member only

Jerod X. Evans (born January 16, 1994) is an American professional football quarterback. He played college football for the Virginia Tech Hokies and signed with the Philadelphia Eagles as an undrafted free agent following the 2017 NFL draft.

== Early life ==
Evans attended Mansfield High School in Mansfield, Texas.

== College career ==
Evans played for the United States Air Force Academy in 2013 before tearing his ACL and transferring to Trinity Valley Community College. After two years at Trinity Valley he transferred to Virginia Tech. In his first year at Virginia Tech in 2016 he was named the starting quarterback. In his first start he threw for 221 yards and four touchdowns against Liberty. In his first season at Virginia Tech he completed the regular season with 26 touchdown passes and 5 interceptions. Evans also broke the record for total offense in a season, previously held by Logan Thomas, leading Virginia Tech to the 2016 ACC Championship game against Clemson with a 9-3 (6-2 Coastal) record. In the 2016 Belk Bowl Evans led Virginia Tech to overcome a school record 24 point deficit with 330 all-purpose yards. Evans' 2016 season set school records for most passes completed (263), most touchdowns thrown (28), most touchdowns thrown in a game (5), most passing yards, and highest completion percentage.

On January 2, 2017, Evans announced that he was foregoing his senior year and entering the 2017 NFL draft, but he ended up undrafted.

=== Statistics ===
Year	Team	Passing								Rushing			
Year	Team	Cmp	Att	Pct	Yds	Y/A	TD	Int	Rtg	Att	Yds	Avg	TD
2016	Virginia Tech	268	422	63.8	3,552	8.4	29	8	153.1	204	846	4.1	12
Career		268	422	63.8	3,552	8.4	29	8	153.1	204	846	4.1	12

== Professional career ==
Pre-draft measurables
Height	Weight	Arm length	Hand span	40-yard dash	10-yard split	20-yard split	20-yard shuttle	Vertical jump	Broad jump	Wonderlic
6 ft 2 3/4 in (1.90 m)	232 lb (105 kg)	33 1/8 in (0.84 m)	9 3/8 in (0.24 m)	4.80 s	1.63 s	2.81 s	4.41 s	26.5 in (0.67 m)	9 ft 4 in (2.84 m)	21
All values from NFL Combine

=== Philadelphia Eagles ===
Evans signed with the Philadelphia Eagles as an undrafted free agent on May 11, 2017. He suffered a foot injury in the first week of rookie minicamp and was waived/injured by the Eagles and placed on injured reserve on May 14. Evans was waived from injured reserve on May 22, with an injury settlement.

=== Green Bay Packers ===
On October 17, 2017, Evans was signed to the Green Bay Packers' practice squad. He was released by the Packers on December 19.

=== The Spring League ===
In March 2018, Evans was named as a quarterback for the East team in the 2018 edition of The Spring League, a developmental showcase and scouting event for current NFL free agents.

=== Washington Valor ===
On May 22, 2018, Evans was assigned to the Washington Valor. On July 2, he was placed on reassignment.

=== Baltimore Brigade ===
On March 6, 2019, Evans was assigned to the Baltimore Brigade.

=== Washington Valor ===
On April 12, 2019, Evans was traded to the Washington Valor.

=== Tokyo Gas Creators ===
In 2021, Evans joined the Tokyo Gas creators of Japan's XLeague.

=== Carolina Cobras ===
In 2022, Evans joined the Carolina Cobras of the National Arena League (NAL).

=== Vegas Knight Hawks ===
On April 28, 2022, Evans signed with the Vegas Knight Hawks of the Indoor Football League (IFL). He was released by the Knight Hawks on June 15.

=== Northern Arizona Wranglers ===
On June 20, 2022, Evans was signed by the Northern Arizona Wranglers.

=== Fehérvár Enthroners ===
On April 23, 2023, Evans was signed by the Hungarian Fehérvár Enthroners of European League of Football. He was released on June 20.

== Personal ==
Evans' brother Caleb was a former starting quarterback for the University of Louisiana - Monroe Warhawks, and now is a quarterback for the Montreal Alouettes of the Canadian Football League.

Awards and achievements
Preceded by Don Strock	Virginia Tech single-season passing record 2016–present (3,546 yards)	Succeeded by current
Preceded by Tyrod Taylor	Virginia Tech single-season passing touchdown record 2016–present (29)	Succeeded by current
Preceded by Logan Thomas	Virginia Tech single-season total offense record 2016–present (4,392 yards)	Succeeded by current
Preceded by Logan Thomas	Virginia Tech single-season total touchdown record 2016–present (41)	Succeeded by current
