= Northland (Columbus, Ohio) =

Neighborhood in Columbus, Ohio

- Neighborhood of Columbus, Ohio
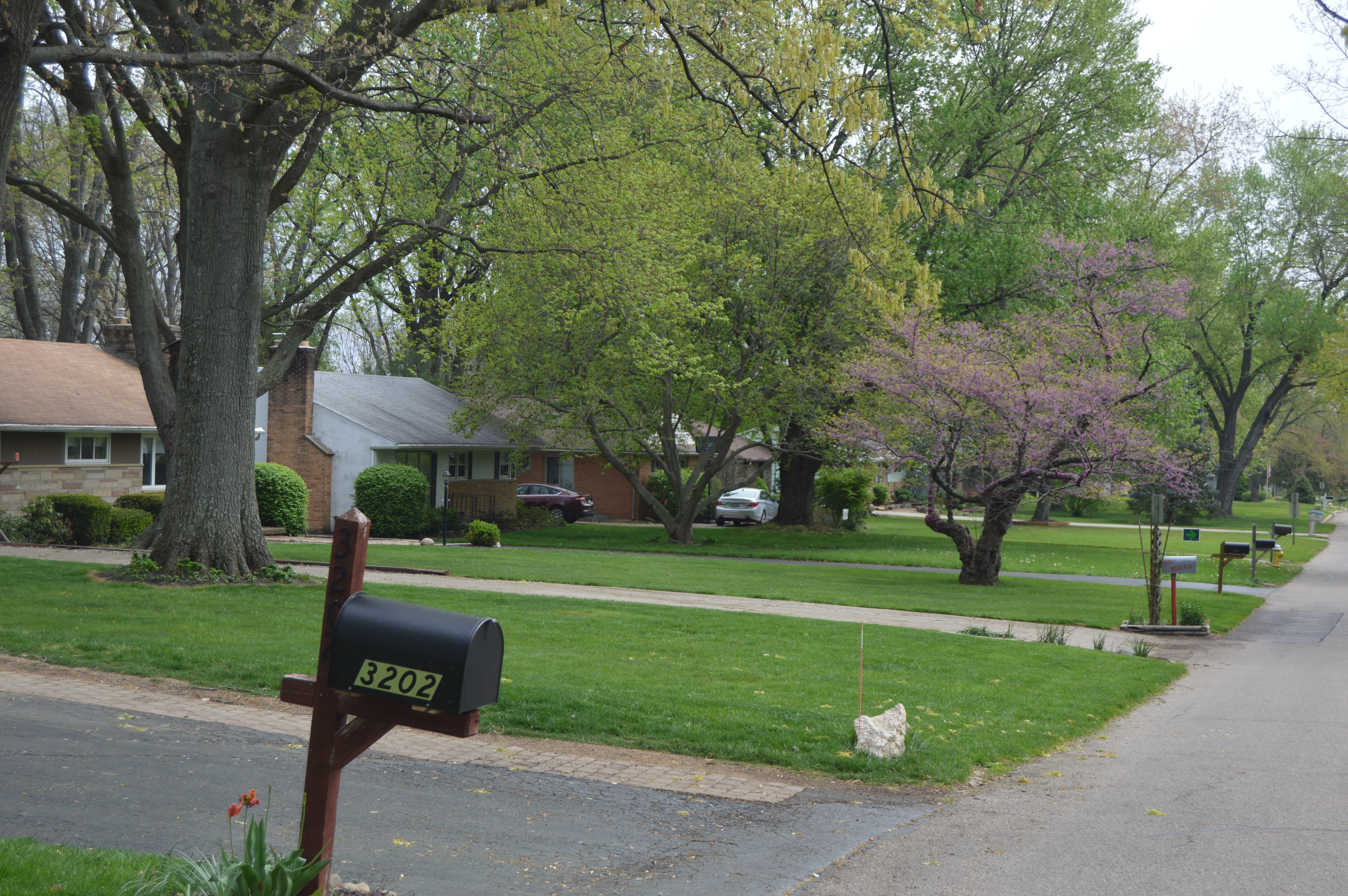
- Houses in Minerva Park, a village in the Northland area
- Interactive maps of the Northland area plans I and II
- Coordinates: 40°04′28″N 82°56′15″W
- Country: United States
- State: Ohio
- County: Franklin
- City: Columbus
- ZIP Code: 43229, 43230, 43231
- Area code: 614/380

Northland is a residential and commercial area in northeast Columbus, Ohio. The area is served by the Northland Community Council, which oversees land east of Worthington, roughly north of Morse Road, south of I-270, and west of New Albany, including the neighborhood Forest Park and the independent village of Minerva Park.

The area has one of the largest populations of new American citizens in Columbus, including thousands of refugees from Nepal, Somalia, and Bhutan.

== Attributes ==
The neighborhood has approximately 25 square miles (65 km^{2}). It is roughly north of Morse Road, south of I-270, and west of New Albany, including the neighborhood Forest Park and the independent village of Minerva Park.

As of 2021, the neighborhood has a population of 97,000; if it were an independent city, it would be the seventh-largest in Ohio.

In the neighborhood's northwest corner is an Anheuser-Busch brewery. The facility opened in 1968; a year later herds of buffalo and deer were brought in, with the hope to open a theme park or animal reserve. Plans changed and the approximately 160 animals were moved to Busch Gardens Williamsburg in 1974. The brewery was nevertheless popular to tourists; the facility had guided tours, gift shops, and a welcome center. The welcome center was demolished in the late 1990s to make room for an expansion, and so public tours ceased.

=== Schools ===
The area has three public high schools, including Northland High School, Beechcroft High School, and Columbus Global Academy. Columbus Global Academy also operates as a middle school, and has a focus on education for immigrant students. The school opened in 2008 in the former Brookhaven High School.

=== Malls ===
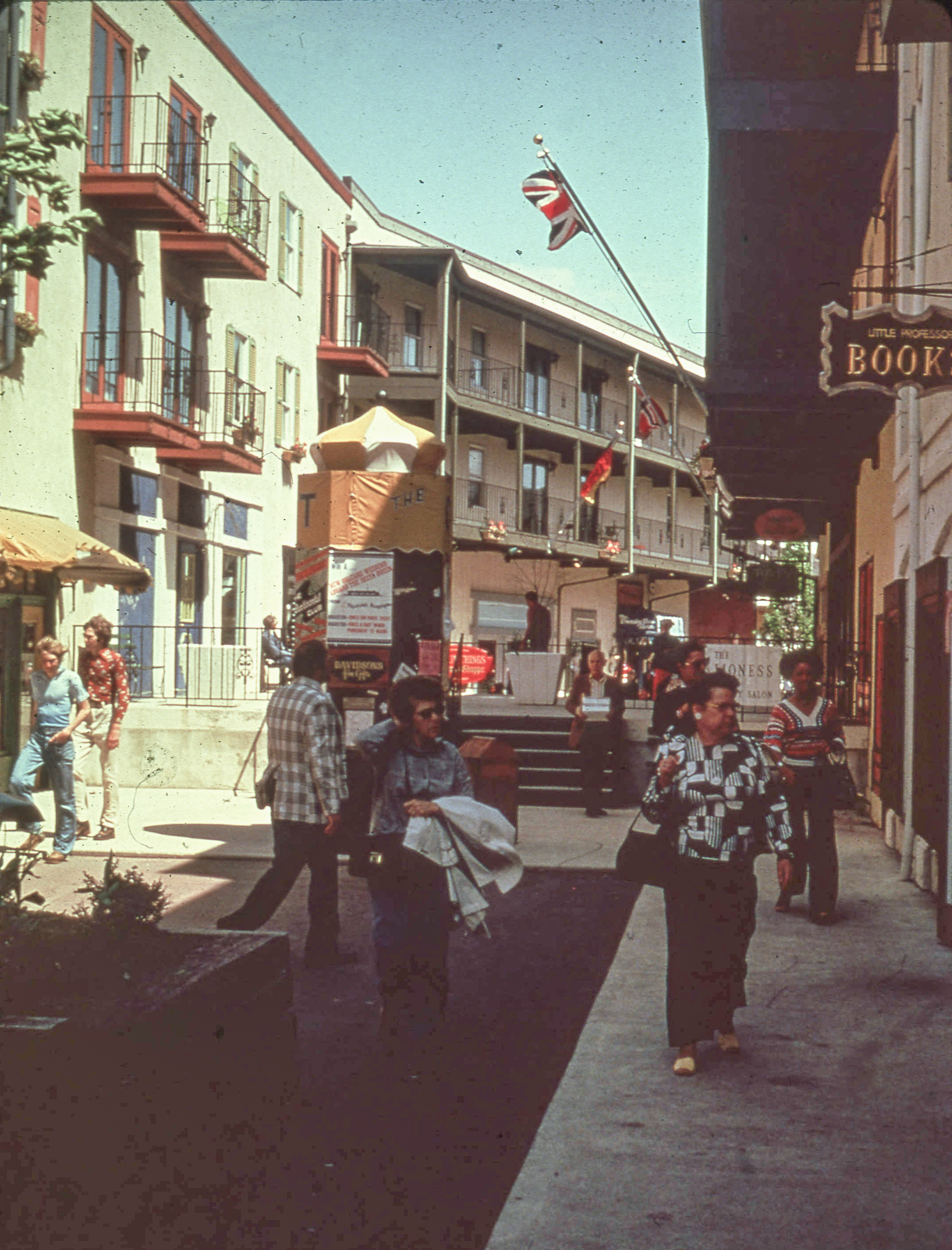
The Continent in the 1970s

The area had two large shopping areas in the late 20th century: Northland Mall and The Continent. The Continent opened in 1972 as an open-air mall, with a European-influenced design and cafes, stores, and apartments. Its French Market was the mall's centerpiece. The Continent slowly declined into the 2000s as newer malls opened elsewhere; its storefronts are mostly vacant, though its apartments are still in use.

Global Mall, a shopping center on Morse Road, opened in 2002. The mall has 30 businesses, a majority owned by Somalis, selling traditional Somali food, drinks, clothing, jewelry, and travel services.

== Neighborhoods ==
=== Clinton Estates ===
Clinton Estates is a neighborhood of 718 houses built in the 1950s made up mainly of Cape Cod-style houses, ranches, and split-level homes. It is bordered by Morse Road to the north and East Cooke Road to the south; Maize Road borders it on the west and Karl Road borders it on the east. The Clinton Estates Civic Association is an active civic organization and block watch in the neighborhood.

The neighborhood has several churches located within its boundaries and includes the schools Columbus Global Academy and Maize Road Elementary. It annually holds its Neighborhood Blast (a community garage sale) that is well attended by the community.

=== Forest Park ===
The community of Forest Park consists of about 2,900 private residential properties (single-family homes and duplexes), plus apartments, condominiums, commercial properties, city-owned parks and schools, in approximately 1.4 square miles (3.6 km^{2}) of the Northland area. These properties adjoin a total of 132 distinct streets and courts maintained by the City of Columbus. The community's approximate center is near the intersection of Karl Road and Sandalwood Place in Columbus.

=== Maize-Morse ===
Just north of Linden, this neighborhood encompasses the area south of Morse Road and north of East Cooke Road. Interstate 71 borders it on the west and Maize Road borders it on the east.

In recent years, the area has seen a rebirth following decline, including new commercial investments. A$13 million animal shelter project in the neighborhood was completed in 2011. The city has also contributed to the revitalization with tax abatements for businesses and road projects, including new bike lanes and sidewalks, with their total investment in the neighborhood amounting to $49.3 million.

=== Northern Woods ===
Found on the northeast side of the city, this neighborhood is bordered by the Interstate 270 outerbelt on the north and east, Minerva Park on the south, and the Northgate neighborhood on the west. In recent years, the area has seen a rebirth following decline, including new commercial and residential investments at the old Northland Mall site, now called "Northland Village". The Franklin County Dog Shelter also moved to the neighborhood in October 2011.

=== Woodward Park ===
Woodward Park is bordered to the south by Morse Road, the city's public Woodward Park to the north, Interstate 71 to the west and Karl Road to the east.

== History ==
The neighborhood was first developed in 1955 when the Metzger Brothers created the Forest Park development. In 1962, development increased when Interstate 71 was completed, linking the area with Downtown Columbus. In 1964, Northland Mall opened. In the 1990s into the 2000s, the area started to decline, and Northland Mall closed in 2002. Shortly afterward, the area became improved again, due to a rising immigrant population.

== See also ==
- Columbus nightclub shooting
- Neighborhoods in Columbus, Ohio
