= Cactus Bowl =

Annual college football tournament in Arizona

- Stadium: Mountain America Stadium
- Location: Tempe, Arizona
- Previous stadiums: Arizona Stadium (1989–1999); Bank One Ballpark (2000–2005); Sun Devil Stadium (2006–2015); Chase Field (2016–2025)
- Previous locations: Tucson, Arizona (1989–1999); Phoenix, Arizona (2000–2005, 2016–2025); Tempe, Arizona (2006–2015)
- Operated: since 1989
- Conference tie-ins: Big 12, Big Ten
- Previous conference tie-ins: WAC (1990–1997); Big 12 (1998–2001); Big East (1998–2005); Pac-10 (2002–2005, 2013–2019); Big 12 (2006–2013); Big Ten (2006–2013)
- Payout: US$1,625,560 (2019)
- Website: cactusbowl.com

Sponsors
- Domino's Pizza (1990–1991); Weiser Lock (1992–1995); Insight Enterprises (1997–2011); Buffalo Wild Wings (2012–2013); TicketCity (2015); Motel 6 (2016, 2 games); Kellogg's Cheez-It (2018–2019); Guaranteed Rate / Rate (2020–2025)

Former names
- Copper Bowl (1989); Domino's Pizza Copper Bowl (1990–1991); Weiser Lock Copper Bowl (1992–1995); Copper Bowl (1996); Insight.com Bowl (1997–2001); Insight Bowl (2002–2011); Buffalo Wild Wings Bowl (2012–2013); TicketCity Cactus Bowl (2015); Motel 6 Cactus Bowl (2016, 2 games); Cactus Bowl (2017); Cheez-It Bowl (2018–2019) (Note: Not to be confused with the later Cheez-It Bowl (2020–2022).); Guaranteed Rate Bowl (2020–2023); Rate Bowl (2024–2025)

2025 matchup
- New Mexico vs. Minnesota (Minnesota 20–17^{OT})

The Cactus Bowl is an annual college football bowl game that has been played in the state of Arizona since 1989, under several different names.

Played as the Copper Bowl from inception through 1996, it was known as the Insight.com Bowl from 1997 through 2001, then the Insight Bowl from 2002 through 2011, the Buffalo Wild Wings Bowl for 2012 and 2013, and the Cactus Bowl for the 2014 through 2017 seasons. In 2018 and 2019, the game was known as the Cheez-It Bowl. The game was known as the Guaranteed Rate Bowl from 2020 until 2023 and then the Rate Bowl for the 2024 and 2025 playings. In 2026, the Fiesta Sports Foundation announced the game would rebrand back to the Cactus Bowl name.

The bowl has been contested at three different venues in three different cities in Arizona. The first 11 editions were held at Arizona Stadium (Note: Now known as Casino Del Sol Stadium) in Tucson. The 12th through 17th and 27th through 36th editions were held at Chase Field (Note: Formerly known as Bank One Ballpark) in Phoenix. The 18th through 26th editions were held in Tempe, Arizona at the Mountain America Stadium, (Note: Formerly known as Sun Devil Stadium) with the bowl announced to return to this venue in December 2026 for the 37th edition.

== History ==
"Cactus Bowl" had been the originally planned name for what became the Copper Bowl in 1989. The game was played under the Copper Bowl name through 1996, after which title sponsorship rights were assumed by Insight Enterprises, which self-titled the game from 1997 through 2011. In 2012, restaurant chain Buffalo Wild Wings became the sponsor and self-titled the game for two years. Buffalo Wild Wings declined to renew sponsorship following the 2013 game, at which time organizers opted to rename the game "Cactus Bowl" rather than reverting to the Copper Bowl name. There had been a Texas-based Cactus Bowl played in Division II, but that game was discontinued after 2011. For 2014, TicketCity sponsored the new Cactus Bowl, and Motel 6 became the sponsor in 2015. In 2018, Kellogg's became the sponsor and rebranded the bowl, naming it after its cheese cracker brand, Cheez-It. In May 2020, the Cactus Bowl name returned, as Cheez-It sponsorship moved to what had been known as the Camping World Bowl played in Orlando, Florida. Guaranteed Rate signed on as the title sponsor of the game, renaming it as the Guaranteed Rate Bowl. In October 2024, the game became the Rate Bowl as part of a company rebrand.

When the bowl was founded, it was played at Arizona Stadium in Tucson, on the campus of the University of Arizona. In 2000, the organizers moved the game from Tucson to Phoenix. There, it was played at what became known as Chase Field, the home of the Arizona Diamondbacks of Major League Baseball. For the 2006 season, the bowl moved a second time. After the annual Fiesta Bowl left Sun Devil Stadium in Tempe to play in University of Phoenix Stadium in Glendale, the bowl (then still known as the Insight Bowl) was relocated there as a permanent replacement. The bowl returned to its previous home at Chase Field in Phoenix for the January 2016 event, due to renovation work at Sun Devil Stadium that was expected to last at least three off-seasons until the 2025 season. In 2026, in addition to a name change, it was announced that the game would move back to Mountain America Stadium (formerly known as Sun Devil Stadium) in Tempe.

For the first three playings of the Copper Bowl, TBS carried the game. Beginning in 1992 and continuing until the 2005 playing, the game aired on ESPN. After a four-year hiatus, during which NFL Network carried the game, ESPN regained the rights beginning in 2010.

The 2006 game set a record (since tied in the 2016 Alamo Bowl) for the biggest comeback in NCAA Division I FBS bowl history, as Texas Tech came back from a 38–7 third-quarter deficit to defeat Minnesota in overtime, 44–41.

The 2020 edition of the bowl was cancelled on December 20, 2020, due to an insufficient number of teams available to fill all 2020–21 bowl games, after a season impacted by the COVID-19 pandemic.

=== Conference tie-ins ===
Before 2006, the game mainly featured teams from the Pac-10, Western Athletic Conference, Big 12, and old Big East conferences. From 2006 to 2013, it began featuring an annual matchup between teams from the Big Ten and the Big 12. Starting with the 2015 game, it featured a matchup between Pac-12 and Big 12 teams. Teams from the Atlantic Coast Conference and Mountain West Conference have also competed, along with teams from the now defunct Southwest Conference and Big Eight, and one independent school (Notre Dame in 2004). In July 2019, the bowl announced tie-ins with the Big Ten and Big 12 conferences, starting with the 2020 season and continuing through the 2025 season. The press release for the 2026 edition also noted a Big Ten and Big 12 matchup, without specifying an additional duration to these tie-ins.

== Game results ==
All rankings are taken from the AP Poll prior to the game being played.

No.	Date	Bowl name	Winning Team		Losing Team		Attendance
1	December 31, 1989	Copper Bowl	Arizona	17	NC State	10	37,237
2	December 31, 1990	Copper Bowl	California	17	Wyoming	15	36,340
3	December 31, 1991	Copper Bowl	Indiana	24	Baylor	0	35,751
4	December 29, 1992	Copper Bowl	No 18 Washington State	31	Utah	28	40,826
5	December 29, 1993	Copper Bowl	No. 20 Kansas State	52	Wyoming	17	49,075
6	December 29, 1994	Copper Bowl	No. 22 BYU	31	Oklahoma	6	45,122
7	December 27, 1995	Copper Bowl	Texas Tech	55	Air Force	41	41,004
8	December 27, 1996	Copper Bowl	Wisconsin	38	Utah	10	42,122
9	December 27, 1997	Insight.com Bowl	Arizona	20	New Mexico	14	49,385
10	December 26, 1998	Insight.com Bowl	No. 23 Missouri	34	West Virginia	31	36,147
11	December 31, 1999	Insight.com Bowl	Colorado	62	No. 25 Boston College	28	35,762
12	December 28, 2000	Insight.com Bowl	Iowa State	37	Pittsburgh	29	41,813
13	December 29, 2001	Insight.com Bowl	No. 18 Syracuse	26	Kansas State	3	40,028
14	December 26, 2002	Insight Bowl	No. 24 Pittsburgh	38	Oregon State	13	40,533
15	December 26, 2003	Insight Bowl	California	52	Virginia Tech	49	42,364
16	December 28, 2004	Insight Bowl	Oregon State	38	Notre Dame	21	45,917
17	December 27, 2005	Insight Bowl	Arizona State	45	Rutgers	40	43,536
18	December 29, 2006	Insight Bowl	Texas Tech	44	Minnesota	41 (OT)	48,391
19	December 31, 2007	Insight Bowl	Oklahoma State	49	Indiana	33	48,892
20	December 31, 2008	Insight Bowl	Kansas	42	Minnesota	21	49,103
21	December 31, 2009	Insight Bowl	Iowa State	14	Minnesota	13	45,090
22	December 28, 2010	Insight Bowl	Iowa	27	No. 14 Missouri	24	53,453
23	December 30, 2011	Insight Bowl	No. 19 Oklahoma	31	Iowa	14	54,247
24	December 29, 2012	Buffalo Wild Wings Bowl	Michigan State	17	TCU	16	44,617
25	December 28, 2013	Buffalo Wild Wings Bowl	Kansas State	31	Michigan	14	53,284
26	January 2, 2015	Cactus Bowl	Oklahoma State	30	Washington	22	35,409
27	January 2, 2016	Cactus Bowl	West Virginia	43	Arizona State	42	39,321
28	December 27, 2016	Cactus Bowl	Baylor	31	Boise State	12	33,328
29	December 26, 2017	Cactus Bowl	Kansas State	35	UCLA	17	32,859
30	December 26, 2018	Cheez-It Bowl	TCU	10	California	7 (OT)	33,121
31	December 27, 2019	Cheez-It Bowl	No. 24 Air Force	31	Washington State	21	34,105
—	December 26, 2020	Guaranteed Rate Bowl	Canceled: insufficient number of teams available				
32	December 28, 2021	Guaranteed Rate Bowl	Minnesota	18	West Virginia	6	21,220
33	December 27, 2022	Guaranteed Rate Bowl	Wisconsin	24	Oklahoma State	17	23,187
34	December 26, 2023	Guaranteed Rate Bowl	Kansas	49	UNLV	36	26,478
35	December 26, 2024	Rate Bowl	Kansas State	44	Rutgers	41	21,659
36	December 26, 2025	Rate Bowl	Minnesota	20	New Mexico	17 (OT)	27,439
37	December 26, 2026	Cactus Bowl					

Games 1–11 (copper) played in Tucson at Arizona Stadium
Games 12–17, 27–36 (silver) played in Phoenix at Chase Field (formerly Bank One Ballpark)
Games 18–26, 37–present (yellow) played in Tempe at Mountain America Stadium (formerly Sun Devil Stadium)

== MVPs ==
Two MVPs are selected for each game; one an offensive player, the other a defensive player.

Game	Offensive MVP			Defensive MVP		
Game	Player	Team	Position	Player	Team	Position
1989	Shane Montgomery	North Carolina State	QB	Scott Geyer	Arizona	DB
1990	Mike Pawlawski	California	QB	Robert Midgett	Wyoming	LB
1991	Vaughn Dunbar	Indiana	TB	Mark Hagen	Indiana	LB
1992	Drew Bledsoe	Washington State	QB	Kareem Leary	Utah	DB
1993	Andre Coleman	Kansas State	WR	Kenny McEntyre	Kansas State	CB
1994	Jamal Willis	BYU	RB	Broderick Simpson	Oklahoma	LB
1995	Zebbie Lethridge	Texas Tech	QB	Mickey Dalton	Air Force	CB
1996	Ron Dayne	Wisconsin	RB	Tarek Saleh	Wisconsin	LB
1997	Trung Canidate	Arizona	RB	Jimmy Sprotte	Arizona	LB
1998	Marc Bulger	West Virginia	QB	Jeff Marriott	Missouri	DT
1999	Cortlen Johnson	Colorado	RB	Jashon Sykes	Colorado	LB
2000	Sage Rosenfels	Iowa State	QB	Reggie Hayward	Iowa State	DE
2001	James Mungro	Syracuse	RB	Clifton Smith	Syracuse	LB
2002	Brandon Miree	Pittsburgh	TB	Claude Harriott	Pittsburgh	DL
2003	Aaron Rodgers	California	QB	Ryan Gutierrez	California	FS
2004	Derek Anderson	Oregon State	QB	Trent Bray	Oregon State	LB
2005	Rudy Carpenter	Arizona State	QB	Jamar Williams	Arizona State	LB
2006	Graham Harrell	Texas Tech	QB	Antonio Huffman	Texas Tech	CB
2007	Zac Robinson	Oklahoma State	QB	Donovan Woods	Oklahoma State	S
2008	Dezmon Briscoe	Kansas	WR	James Holt	Kansas	LB
2009	Alexander Robinson	Iowa State	RB	Christopher Lyle	Iowa State	DE
2010	Marcus Coker	Iowa	RB	Micah Hyde	Iowa	DB
2011	Blake Bell	Oklahoma	QB	Jamell Fleming	Oklahoma	DB
2012	Le'Veon Bell	Michigan State	RB	William Gholston	Michigan State	DE
2013	Tyler Lockett	Kansas State	WR	Dante Barnett	Kansas State	DB
2015	Desmond Roland	Oklahoma State	RB	Seth Jacobs	Oklahoma State	LB
2016 (Jan.)	Skyler Howard	West Virginia	QB	Shaq Petteway	West Virginia	LB
2016 (Dec.)	KD Cannon	Baylor	WR	Tyrone Hunt	Baylor	DE
2017	Alex Delton	Kansas State	QB	Denzel Goolsby	Kansas State	S
2018	Sewo Olonilua	TCU	RB	Jaylinn Hawkins	California	S
2019	Kadin Remsberg	Air Force	RB	Grant Donaldson	Air Force	OLB
2021	Ky Thomas	Minnesota	RB	Tyler Nubin	Minnesota	S
2022	Braelon Allen	Wisconsin	RB	Jordan Turner	Wisconsin	LB
2023	Jason Bean	Kansas	QB	Kenny Logan	Kansas	S
2024	Dylan Edwards	Kansas State	RB	Austin Moore	Kansas State	LB
2025	Jalen Smith	Minnesota	WR	Anthony Smith	Minnesota	DL

== Sportsmanship award ==
The bowl awarded a sportsmanship award for the 2001 through January 2016 games.

Game	Player	Team	Position
2001	Terry Pierce	Kansas State	LB
2002	Derek Anderson	Oregon State	QB
2003	Doug Easlick	Virginia Tech	FB
2004	Derek Curry	Notre Dame	LB
2005	Ryan Neill	Rutgers	DE
2006	Dominic Jones	Minnesota	DB
2007	Jonathan "Josh" Sandberg	Indiana	OG
2008	Jack Simmons	Minnesota	TE
2009	D.J. Burris	Minnesota	OG
2010	Tim Barnes	Missouri	C
2011	Tyler Nielsen	Iowa	LB
2012	Tayo Fabuluje	TCU	OT
2013	Devin Funchess	Michigan	WR
2015	Andrew Hudson	Washington	DE
2016 (Jan.)	D. J. Foster	Arizona State	RB

== Most appearances ==
Updated through the December 2025 edition (36 games, 72 total appearances).

Teams with multiple appearances

Rank	Team	Appearances	Record
1	Kansas State	5	4–1
1	Minnesota	5	2–3
3	Oklahoma State	3	2–1
3	California	3	2–1
3	West Virginia	3	1–2
6	Arizona	2	2–0
6	Texas Tech	2	2–0
6	Iowa State	2	2–0
6	Wisconsin	2	2–0
6	Kansas	2	2–0
6	Air Force	2	1–1
6	Arizona State	2	1–1
6	Indiana	2	1–1
6	Missouri	2	1–1
6	Oregon State	2	1–1
6	Pittsburgh	2	1–1
6	Iowa	2	1–1
6	Oklahoma	2	1–1
6	Baylor	2	1–1
6	TCU	2	1–1
6	Washington State	2	1–1
6	New Mexico	2	0–2
6	Rutgers	2	0–2
6	Utah	2	0–2
6	Wyoming	2	0–2

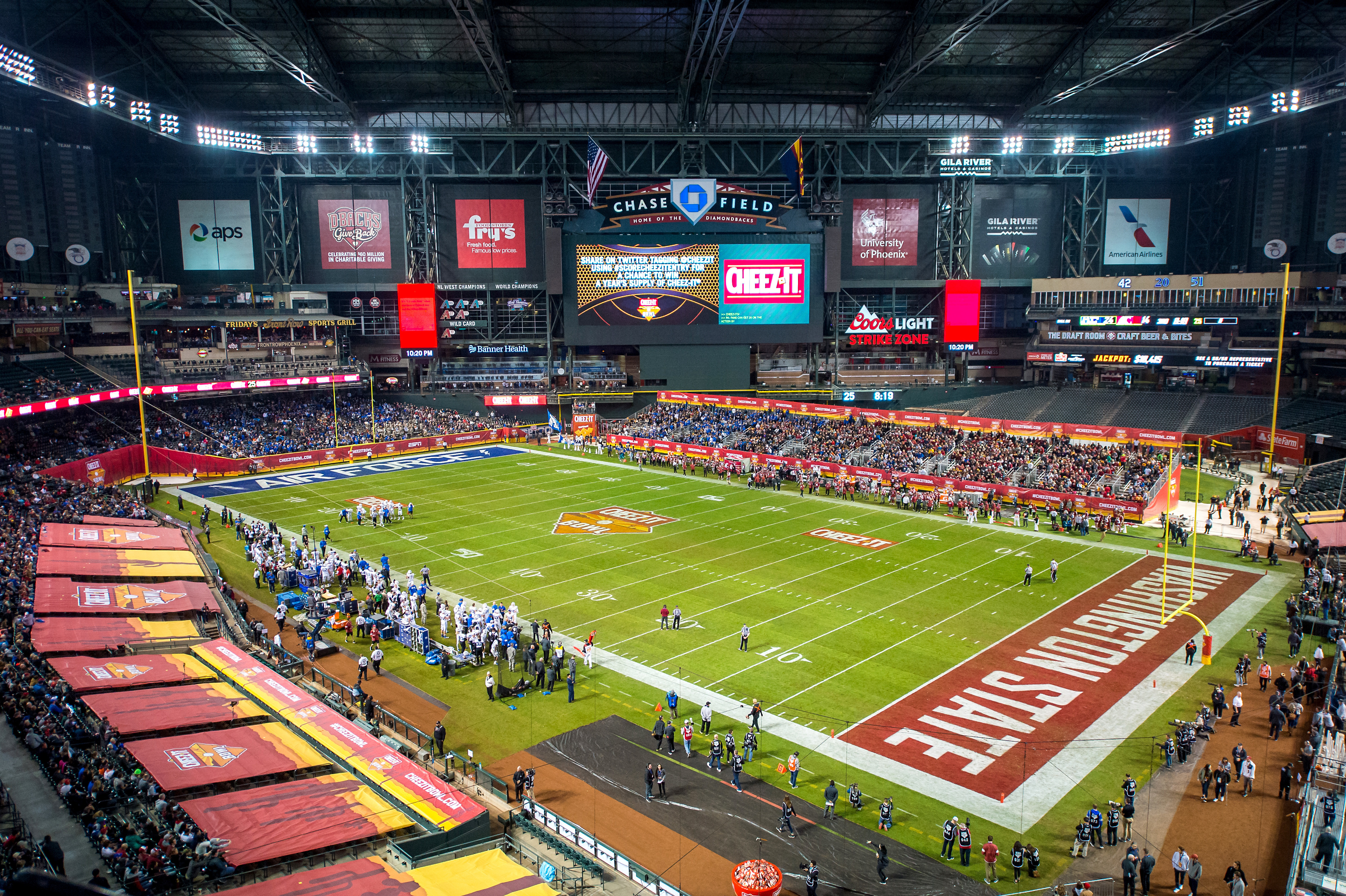
Chase Field prior to the 2019 edition of the bowl

As of 2023, Cincinnati, Houston, and UCF are the only current Big 12 schools that have not played in this bowl, albeit some while having previous conference affiliations. Eight of the current Big 12 schools have appeared multiple times. Former Big 12 member Missouri has appeared in the bowl, but former Big 12 members Nebraska, Texas and Texas A&M have not.

Teams with a single appearance

Won (4): BYU, Colorado, Michigan State, Syracuse
Lost (9): Boise State, Boston College, Michigan, North Carolina State, Notre Dame, UCLA, UNLV, Virginia Tech, Washington

== Appearances by conference ==
Updated through the December 2025 edition (36 games, 72 total appearances).

Conference	Record				Appearances by season	
Conference	Games	W	L	Win pct.	Won	Lost
Big 12	21	16	5	.762	1998, 1999, 2000, 2006, 2007, 2008, 2009, 2011, 2013, 2014*, 2015*, 2016, 2017, 2018, 2023, 2024	2001, 2010, 2012, 2021, 2022
Big Ten	14	7	7	.500	1991, 1996, 2010, 2012, 2021, 2022, 2025	2006, 2007, 2008, 2009, 2011, 2013, 2024
Pac-12	13	7	6	.538	1989, 1990, 1992, 1997, 2003, 2004, 2005	2002, 2014*, 2015*, 2017, 2018, 2019
Big East	7	2	5	.286	2001, 2002	1998, 1999, 2000, 2003, 2005
WAC	7	1	6	.143	1994	1990, 1992, 1993, 1995, 1996, 1997
Mountain West	4	1	3	.250	2019	2016, 2023, 2025
Big Eight	2	1	1	.500	1993	1994
SWC	2	1	1	.500	1995	1991
ACC	1	0	1	.000		1989
Independents	1	0	1	.000		2004

- Games marked with an asterisk (*) were played in January of the following calendar year.
- Records reflect conference affiliations at the time each game was played.
- The Pac-12's record includes appearances when the conference was the Pac-10. From 1989 through 2005, Pac-10 teams made eight appearances and were 7–1.
- Big East teams made seven appearances and were 2–5; the American Conference retains the conference charter following the 2013 split of the original Big East along football lines.
- Conferences that are defunct or no longer active in FBS are marked in italics.
- Independent appearances: Notre Dame (2004)

== Game records ==
Team	Performance vs. opponent	Year
Most points scored (one team)	62, Colorado vs. Boston College	1999
Most points scored (losing team)	49, Virginia Tech vs. California	2003
Most points scored (both teams)	101, California vs. Virginia Tech	2003
Fewest points allowed	0, Indiana vs. Baylor	1991
Largest margin of victory	35, Kansas State vs. Wyoming	1993
Total yards	679, Arizona State vs. Rutgers	2005
Rushing yards	431, Air Force vs. Texas Tech	1995
Passing yards	492, Washington State vs. Utah	1992
First downs	33, Arizona State vs. Rutgers	2005
Fewest yards allowed	130, North Carolina State vs. Arizona	1989
Fewest rushing yards allowed	8, Pittsburgh vs. Oregon State	2002
Fewest passing yards allowed	16, Utah vs. Wisconsin	1996
Individual	Performance vs. opponent	Year
Total offense	555, Skyler Howard, West Virginia vs. Arizona State	2016*
All-purpose yards	289, Tim White, Arizona State vs. West Virginia	2016*
Rushing yards	260, Byron Hanspard, Texas Tech vs. Air Force	1995
Rushing touchdowns	4, Byron Hanspard, Texas Tech vs. Air Force	1995
Passing yards	532, Skyler Howard, West Virginia vs. Arizona State	2016*
Passing touchdowns	6, Jason Bean, Kansas vs UNLV	2023
Receptions	15, T.J. Moe, Missouri vs. Iowa	2010
Receiving yards	212, Phillip Bobo, Washington State vs. Utah	1992
Receiving touchdowns	3, shared by: Dezmon Briscoe, Kansas vs. Minnesota; Luke Grimm, Kansas vs. UNLV; Lawrence Arnold, Kansas vs. UNLV	2008; 2023; 2023
Tackles	20 (total), Jahad Woods, Washington State vs. Air Force	2019
Interceptions	2, most recent: Cameron Oliver, UNLV vs. Kansas	2023
Long Plays	Performance vs. opponent	Year
Touchdown run	71, Danta Johnson, Air Force vs. Texas Tech	1995
Touchdown pass	87, Phillip Bobo from Drew Bledsoe, Washington State vs. Utah	1992
Kickoff return	100, Damon Bankston, New Mexico vs Minnesota	2025
Punt return	88, Ben Kelly, Colorado vs. Boston College	1999
Interception return	78, George White, Boston College vs. Colorado	1999
Fumble return	15, Orion Stewart, Baylor vs. Boise State	2016
Punt	67, shared by: Travis Brown, Kansas State vs. Syracuse; Tress Way, Oklahoma vs. Iowa	2001; 2011
Field goal	53, Jaden Oberkrom, TCU vs. Michigan State	2012

Games marked with an asterisk (*) were played in January of the noted calendar year.

== Media coverage ==
The bowl has been televised by three different networks: TBS (1989–1991), ESPN (1992–2005, 2010–2025), and NFL Network (2006–2009).

The 2026 game is scheduled to be aired as part of Saturday Night Football on ABC.
