= Forest Park Elementary School =

Forest Park Elementary School can refer to the following schools:

- Forest Park Elementary School (Arkansas), in Little Rock
- Forest Park Elementary School (California), in Fremont
- Forest Park Elementary School (Ohio), in the Forest Park neighborhood of Columbus
