= 2003 Insight Bowl =

- 15th Insight Bowl
- Insight Bowl logo
| Virginia Tech Hokies | California Golden Bears |
| (8–4) | (7–6) |
| Big East | Pac-10 |
| 49 | 52 |
| Head coach: Frank Beamer | Head coach: Jeff Tedford |
| | 1 | 2 | 3 | 4 | Total |
|---|---|---|---|---|---|
| Virginia Tech | 21 | 7 | 0 | 21 | 49 |
| California | 7 | 14 | 21 | 10 | 52 |
- Date: December 26, 2003
- Season: 2003
- Stadium: Bank One Ballpark
- Location: Phoenix, Arizona
- MVP: Offense: Aaron Rodgers (California); Defense: Ryan Gutierrez (California)
- Favorite: Virginia Tech by 3
- Referee: Nick Define (MAC)
- Attendance: 42,364
- Payout: US$750,000 per team

United States TV coverage
- Network: ESPN
- Announcers: Mark Malone (Play-by-Play); Mike Golic (Analyst); Rob Stone (Sidelines)
- Nielsen ratings: 3.08

The 2003 Insight Bowl was a post-season American college football bowl game, the 15th edition of the Insight Bowl. It was contested between the Virginia Tech Hokies and the California Golden Bears at Bank One Ballpark in Phoenix, Arizona, on December 26, 2003. The game was the final contest of the 2003 NCAA Division I-A football season for both teams, and ended in a 52–49 victory for California. Virginia Tech and Cal combined for 101 points; only the 2001 GMAC Bowl saw more points scored by two teams in a bowl game without overtime.

During the 2003 college football season, Virginia Tech accumulated an 8–4 regular-season record that included four losses in the Hokies' final six regular-season games. As the third-place team in the Big East Conference, Tech accepted a bid to the 2003 Insight Bowl. Facing the Hokies were the California Golden Bears, who went 7–6 during the regular season, tying for third place in the Pacific-10 (Pac-10).

The 2003 Insight Bowl kicked off at 8:30 p.m. EST on December 26, 2003. From the beginning of the game, it was a quick-paced, high-scoring contest. In the first quarter, Virginia Tech jumped out to a 21–7 lead courtesy of the Tech passing game, which was coordinated by quarterback Bryan Randall, who threw four touchdowns during the game. In the second quarter, California recovered from its 14-point first-quarter deficit by scoring two touchdowns. Tech, meanwhile, scored another, and took a 28–21 lead into halftime.

The offensive onslaught continued in the second half, though it was California who took the advantage at first. Bolstered by an improved defensive effort that held the Hokies scoreless throughout the third quarter, California and quarterback Aaron Rodgers scored 21 unanswered points to take a 42–28 lead into the fourth quarter. In that quarter, the Hokies clawed back into competition. Tech scored a touchdown to begin the quarter, but Cal answered with one of its own, making the score 49–35. The Hokies evened the score at 49–49 after an 80-yard touchdown drive that took less than two minutes and a punt return by DeAngelo Hall for a touchdown. The post-score Tech kickoff went out of bounds, giving the Bears possession at their 35-yard line. With time running out, Cal began to drive for a game-winning score. Cal needed just seven plays to advance 47 yards and set up a field goal attempt. As time expired, kicker Tyler Fredrickson kicked a 35-yard field goal to give California the 52–49 win.

== Team selection ==
In 2003, the Insight Bowl contracted with the Big East conference and Pacific-10 conference to select teams for participation in its annual game. Big East champion Miami was awarded an automatic Bowl Championship Series berth, and second-place Pittsburgh accepted a bid to the Continental Tire Bowl in Charlotte, North Carolina. Continental Tire Bowl officials considered inviting Virginia Tech to participate in the game, but were required to invite Virginia due to the Continental Tire Bowl's contract with the Atlantic Coast Conference. Rather than selecting two teams that faced each other in the final game of the regular season, Continental Bowl officials chose another team. The other possibility for the Hokies was the San Francisco Bowl, whose managers also held a contract with the Big East, but because Tech played in the previous year's San Francisco Bowl, the bowl's organizing committee decided against a second invitation.

California's route to the Insight Bowl was less roundabout. In the Pac-10, first-place Southern California was awarded the conference's Bowl Championship Series bid. Second-place Washington State was selected by the Holiday Bowl, and Oregon, tied for third place with California, received a bid to the Sun Bowl. Oregon had a better overall record than California and also won the teams' head-to-head matchup.

=== Virginia Tech ===
Virginia Tech entered the 2003 college football season having gone 10–4 the previous season, including a season-ending victory over Air Force in the inaugural San Francisco Bowl. During the offseason, the Hokies were extended an invitation to join the Atlantic Coast Conference and accepted, making the 2003 season their final year in the Big East. In the annual preseason poll of reporters covering Big East football, Virginia Tech was picked to finish third in the conference, behind the previous year's champion, Miami, and Pittsburgh.

Virginia Tech's first game of the season was at home against Central Florida on August 31. In a game that saw the debut of quarterback Marcus Vick, brother of former star Hokie Michael Vick, 10th-ranked Virginia Tech pulled out to an early lead before Central Florida fought back in the second half. Tech recovered, however, and won the game, 48–29. Virginia Tech followed the victory with five others. On October 11, a fourth-ranked Hokie squad easily won against Syracuse University, 51–7, giving Virginia Tech a 6–0 record.

In its seventh game, Tech suffered its first loss. Traveling to Morgantown, West Virginia, home of West Virginia University, the third-ranked Hokies lost 28–7 to the No. 23 Mountaineers. The loss was Tech's worst since November 2001, and knocked the previously undefeated Hokies out of contention for the national championship. The Hokies returned home to face another high-ranking opponent, No. 2 Miami. Recovering from the loss against West Virginia, the Hokies delivered one of the highest-profile wins in school history, defeating the second-ranked Hurricanes 31–7. The game ended a 39-game regular-season winning streak by Miami and was Tech's first victory over a top-eight team in 34 games.

Tech's fortunes declined dramatically following the victory over Miami. The week after that win, Tech lost 31–28 to Pittsburgh, then escaped with a one-point win in overtime against Temple University, which had just one win that season. Tech's win against Temple was its last in the regular season. The Hokies lost their final two regular-season games, dropping their overall record to 8–4. To some Virginia Tech fans, the Insight Bowl invitation accepted on December 1 was a disappointment after a season that began with hopes of participation in the national championship game.

=== California ===
The California Golden Bears earned a 7–5 record in 2002, a year that culminated with a 30–7 victory over traditional rival Stanford in the Big Game. It was California's first winning season since 1993, and came on the heels of a 1–10 season in 2001. New head coach Jeff Tedford was praised for turning the program around so quickly, and expectations were high heading into the 2003 season. Tedford was awarded a new five-year contract in the offseason, and in the annual preseason poll of media covering the Pac-10 conference, Cal was picked to finish eighth in the 10-team organization.

In the Bears' first game of the season, California traveled to Arrowhead Stadium in Kansas City, Missouri, to face No. 10 Kansas State for the 2003 BCA Classic. There, California lost 42–28 in the season opener for both teams. California recovered from the loss in its next game, outscoring the visiting Southern Miss Golden Eagles 34–2. Despite the Bears' success against Southern Miss, they struggled in their next two games, losing to both Colorado State and Utah. Traveling to the Midwest to face Big 10 opponent Illinois, California debuted a new quarterback: Aaron Rodgers. Rodgers had success late in California's game against Utah, but did not earn the win. Against Illinois, however, he orchestrated a California offense that emerged victorious, 31–24.

The week after the Illinois game, California faced its toughest opponent of the season: third-ranked Southern California. The USC Trojans were undefeated heading into their game against the Bears and on an 11-game winning streak, but California maintained a lead throughout the game. During the fourth quarter, however, USC rallied to tie California and force overtime, then second and third overtimes when the score remained tied. At the end of the third overtime, California kicker Tyler Fredrickson's 38-yard field goal kick was successful, and the Bears earned a 34–31 victory. It was California's first home victory over a top five team since 1975, and turned out to be USC's only loss of the season. California lost its next two games, but then won four of its final five, completing the regular season with a record of 7–6 and earning a spot in the Insight Bowl.

California head coach Jeff Tedford said, "Playing in a bowl game was one of our primary goals this year, so today's announcement represents a milestone for this team and the Cal football program." The Insight Bowl would be California's first bowl game appearance since 1996.

== Pregame buildup ==
In the weeks leading up to the game, media coverage focused on Virginia Tech's lack of motivation heading into the game. The Hokies were ranked among the top five teams in the country earlier in the season, and had higher expectations than the Insight Bowl, a factor some commentators speculated could cause a distraction. The game was Virginia Tech's first in the state of Arizona, and its first against a Pac-10 team. California played in the 1990 Copper Bowl, the name of the Insight Bowl before a name change in the mid-1990s.

=== Offensive matchups ===
==== Virginia Tech offense ====
Virginia Tech running back Kevin Jones drew media attention one day after Virginia Tech's selection for the Insight Bowl by announcing that he would be foregoing his final year of school in favor of entering the NFL draft. Jones was an All-America selection and broke a Virginia Tech single-season record by rushing for 1,494 yards during the regular season. Speculation immediately turned to the fact that Jones could be the top running back taken in that year's draft.

Assisting Jones' success was a strong offensive line, led by Associated Press first-team All-America center Jake Grove. Grove was the only first-team All-America player for the Hokies that season and earned the Dave Rimington Trophy, given annually to the best college center in the United States. As with Jones, Grove announced his intention to enter the NFL Draft following the Insight Bowl.

Virginia Tech quarterback Bryan Randall also benefited from the Hokies' strong offensive line. Randall finished the regular season having passed for 1,598 yards and 11 touchdowns. He also rushed for 412 yards on the ground, and was the Hokies' second-leading rusher. Wide receiver Ernest Wilford was the Hokies' leading receiver, finishing the regular season with 776 receiving yards and three touchdowns.

==== California offense ====
Running back Adimchinobe Echemandu was named California's regular-season most valuable player by ESPN.com writer Ted Miller, who pointed to Echemandu's 1,161 yards and 12 touchdowns on the ground despite missing one game and most of another due to injury. He was picked ahead of Bears quarterback Aaron Rodgers, who finished the season with 2,509 passing yards and 17 touchdowns despite starting the season as the team's backup player in that position. He outplayed original starting quarterback Reggie Robertson and replaced him during most of the second half of the season.

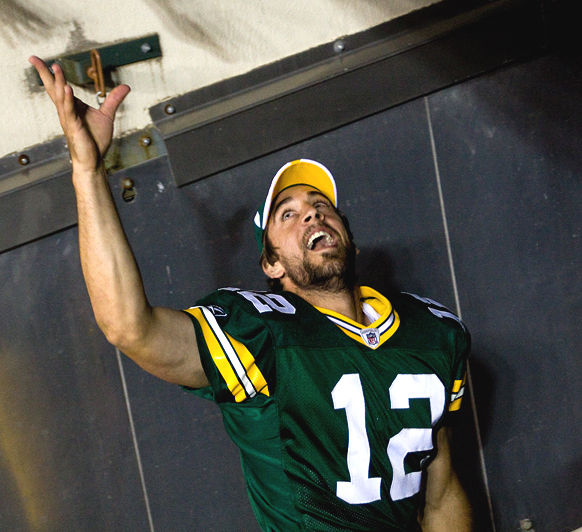
Aaron Rodgers, seen here wearing a Green Bay Packers jersey, was California's quarterback during the game.

Rodgers' favorite passing target was wide receiver Geoff McArthur, who was the Bears' leading receiver during the regular season, catching 85 passes for a school-record 1,504 receiving yards and 10 touchdowns. In one of the Bears' final practices before the Insight Bowl, however, McArthur fractured his right forearm and was unable to play. McArthur recorded the third-highest receiving total for a Pac-10 player and had the second-highest average receiving yards per game in the country during the regular season. He set California single-game records for receiving yards and receptions. Junior receiver Chase Lyman was picked to start the Insight Bowl in McArthur's place. Lyman caught just seven passes for 107 yards during the season.

During practice before the game, California kicker Tyler Fredrickson practiced kicking the ball high to avoid what was expected to be a difficult Virginia Tech kick-blocking attack. During the regular season, Fredrickson had five kicks blocked and successfully converted just 14 of 29 field goal attempts. Virginia Tech, meanwhile, blocked 102 kicks in the 200 games previous to the Insight Bowl.

=== Defensive matchups ===
==== Virginia Tech defense ====
Virginia Tech's defense, which performed well in the beginning of the season and against No. 3 Miami, faltered in the final games of the regular season, allowing 123 points and over 1,800 yards to opponents' offenses. Despite a poor performance when compared with previous seasons' accomplishments, Virginia Tech still ranked second in the Big East conference in total defense, scoring defense, and quarterback sacks.

Leading that defense was cornerback DeAngelo Hall, a second-team All-America selection and first-team All-Big East selection who was also a semifinalist for the Jim Thorpe Award, given annually to the best defensive back in college football. Hall finished the regular season with 54 tackles and 1 interception. Hall was also a threat returning kicks. During the regular season, he returned 30 punts for 434 yards and 2 touchdowns.

==== California defense ====
The California defense was led by defensive back Donnie McCleskey, an All-Pac-10 selection who accumulated 99 tackles—the most on the team—and 2 interceptions during the regular season. The 99 tackles were enough to tie him for 14th place on California's all-time single-season tackle leaders list.

Lineman Ryan Riddle drew attention by accumulating 5.5 sacks and 6.5 tackles for loss despite playing only three games for the Bears. Riddle had not played football for two years while he focused on academics. He eventually signed up with a junior college team, then transferred to California when the Bears expressed interest in having him play on their team.

Linebacker Brendan Tremblay, who finished the season with 31 tackles, was scheduled to miss the game due to a knee injury that required surgery.

== Game summary ==
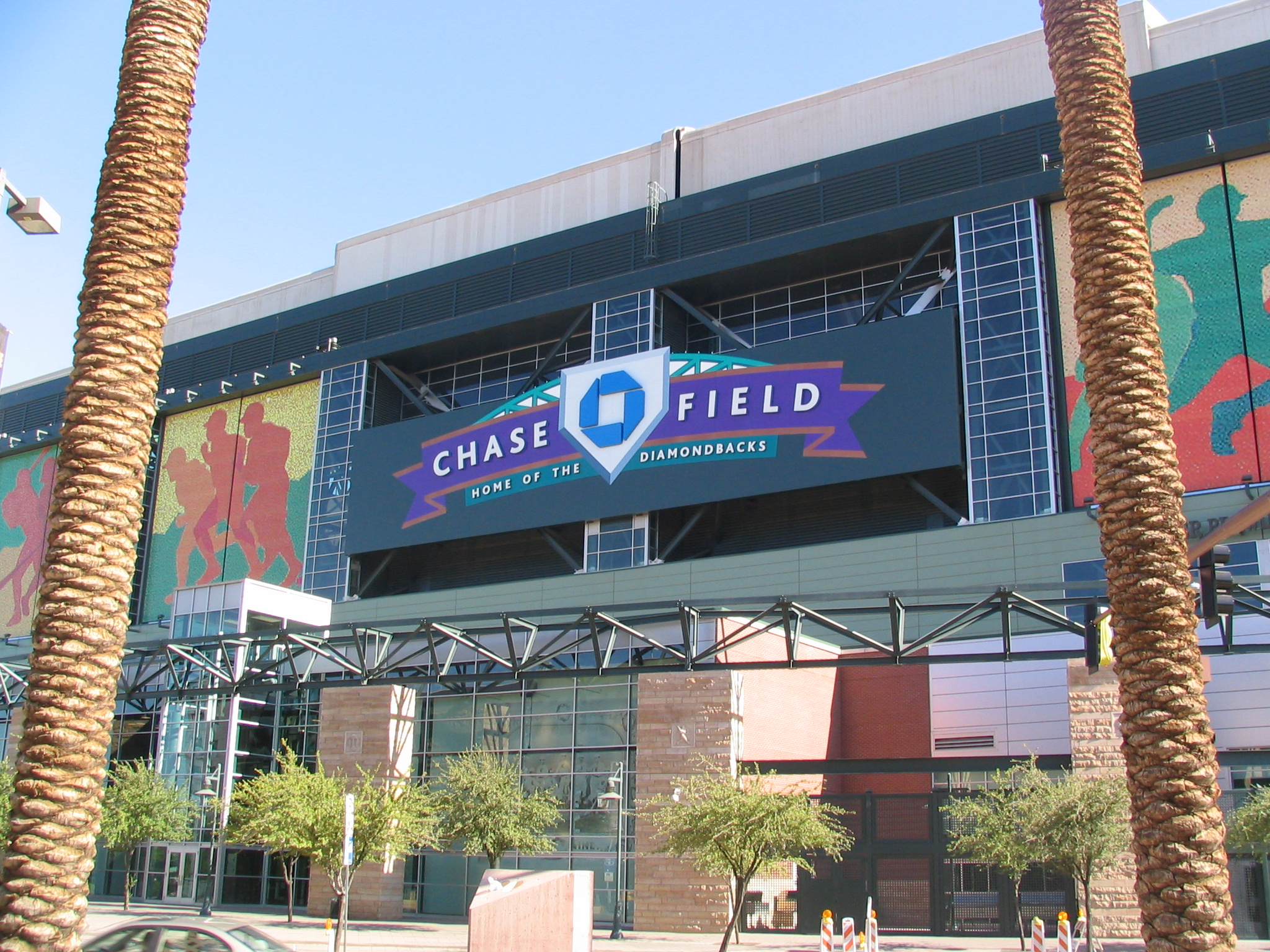
Bank One Ballpark has since been renamed Chase Field.

The 2003 Insight Bowl kicked off at 8:30 p.m. EST on December 26, 2003, at Bank One Ballpark in Phoenix, Arizona. Though normally a baseball stadium, Bank One Ballpark hosted the Insight Bowl from 2000 to 2005 with seating reconfigured from the standard used during baseball games. 42,364 people attended the game, which was just 511 short of a sellout and was the largest crowd to attend an Insight Bowl game since the game moved to Bank One Ballpark in 2000. In exchange for participating in the game, each team received $750,000. On December 24, two days before the game, spread bettors favored Virginia Tech to win by three points.

An estimated 2.7 million people watched the game on ESPN's television broadcast, which was commentated by Mark Malone, Mike Golic and Rob Stone. The audience was large enough to earn the game a Nielsen rating of 3.08, making it the 13th most-viewed bowl game that season and the fourth-highest television rating of the 20 bowl games broadcast on ESPN that season. At kickoff, the weather was clear with an air temperature of 56 °F (13 °C). Owing to the cool temperatures, the roof of Bank One Ballpark (which is retractable) was closed after fireworks were shot off during the opening ceremony.

=== First quarter ===
After the ceremonial pre-game coin toss, California chose to receive the ball to begin the game. James Bethea returned the opening kickoff to the California 21-yard line. On the game's first play from scrimmage, California quarterback Aaron Rodgers completed a 19-yard pass to wide receiver Burl Toler, presaging the game's offensive nature. Rodgers completed another pass, and the Bears were aided by a penalty against Virginia Tech. Running back Adimchinobe Echemandu ran the ball twice for short gains each time, and Rodgers continued to make long passes for first downs to keep the Golden Bears' offensive drive going. Deep inside Virginia Tech territory, Rodgers ran the ball twice, picking up short gains and the game's first touchdown. The extra point kick by kicker Tyler Fredrickson was good, and with 9:43 remaining in the quarter, California took a 7–0 lead.

Virginia Tech's Mike Imoh fielded the post-touchdown kickoff, returning it 52 yards and setting up the Virginia Tech offense inside California territory to begin Tech's first offensive possession of the game. Although Tech quarterback Bryan Randall was sacked for a loss of nine yards on his first play, he recovered to complete all four passes he attempted during the Tech drive, and after pushing the Hokies deep into California territory, scoring on a two-yard touchdown run. The drive took just two and a half minutes off the clock, and the touchdown and subsequent extra point evened the score at 7–7 with 7:13 remaining in the quarter.

After receiving Virginia Tech's kickoff, the California offense returned to the field. The Bears were unable to repeat the success of their first drive and went three and out, punting the ball back to Virginia Tech. The Hokies recovered the ball at their 43-yard line and moved quickly. Bryan Randall completed a 53-yard pass to receiver Chris Shreve. Two plays later, Randall completed a three-yard touchdown pass that gave the Hokies a 14–7 lead with 2:40 remaining in the quarter. California received the ball after the touchdown, but again went three and out. As before, the Hokies struck quickly. After starting from the California 49-yard line, it took one play for Virginia Tech to score. Randall completed a long pass to quarterback Marcus Vick, who came into the game as a wide receiver. The score and extra point made the game 21–7 with 50 seconds left in the quarter. California received the kickoff and ran three quick plays before the end of the quarter. As time expired, California faced a fourth down and nine yards from their 36-yard line and was preparing to punt. With one quarter elapsed, Virginia Tech led, 21–7.

=== Second quarter ===
The second quarter began with a California punt. Virginia Tech recovered at its 15-yard line and began the first offensive series of the second quarter. On the first full play of the quarter, Virginia Tech running back Kevin Jones broke free of the California defense for a 42-yard gain. On the next play, Bryan Randall completed an 11-yard pass to receiver Ernest Wilford. Jones returned to action with a nine-yard run, driving the Hokies to the California 22-yard line, but there the Hokie offense stalled. Tech faced a second down and needed just two yards for a first down, but could not gain the required yardage in two attempts. Tech kicker Carter Warley was sent in to attempt a 40-yard field goal, but his kick missed and California took over on offense at its 23-yard line.

In their first drive of the second quarter, the Golden Bears found success that was missing since their first drive of the game. Quarterback Aaron Rodgers completed a short pass, then scrambled for 24 yards and a first down. California ran the ball three times for another first down, then Rodgers connected with Chase Lyman on a 33-yard touchdown toss. The score was California's first since the opening drive of the game and cut Virginia Tech's lead to 21–14 with 9:10 remaining before halftime. The Hokies recovered the post-touchdown kickoff at their 20-yard line and began a scoring drive of their own. At first, the Hokies moved slowly, spending six plays to move just 14 yards, gaining a first down in the process. Then, facing a third down and seven, Randall completed a 25-yard pass to Richard Johnson. This was followed by another long pass—this one a 31-yarder—to Marcus Vick. On the play immediately following, Kevin Jones ran for seven yards and a Virginia Tech touchdown. The Tech score made the game 28–14 with 5:09 remaining in the quarter.

California began its next drive at its 29-yard line after a short kickoff return. At first, the Bears struggled to move the ball, but were helped by a 15-yard personal foul penalty against Virginia Tech. This advanced the ball near midfield and gave California a first down. Aaron Rodgers then completed a series of passes to drive California into the Virginia Tech side of the field and into the end zone. On a 13-yard pass to J. J. Arrington, Rodgers cut Virginia Tech's lead to 28–21 with 30 seconds remaining. Virginia Tech took over after the kickoff at its 31-yard line. Kevin Jones ran for 15 yards and Bryan Randall completed a 30-yard pass to drive Tech into California territory. Tech was unable to advance the ball further, but kicker Carter Warley was sent in to attempt a 45-yard field goal. As time expired in the first half, Warley's kick missed, denying the Hokies a chance to extend their lead. At the end of the first half, Virginia Tech still held a 28–21 lead.

=== Third quarter ===
Because California received the ball to begin the game, Virginia Tech received the ball to begin the second half. Virginia Tech's Mike Imoh fielded the ball at the goal line and returned it 40 yards. Bryan Randall got off to a good start, completing two passes for 26 yards, and Kevin Jones ran the ball another 16 yards. After pushing inside the California red zone, however, the California defense stiffened and Tech was prevented from gaining another first down. Kicker Carter Warley attempted his third field goal of the game—this one a 28-yard kick—but as before, the kick was no good.

After the missed kick, California took over at its 12-yard line. Aaron Rodgers completed three passes for 58 yards and Arrington added 15 yards on an end-around run. It took California 2:44 in game time to advance 88 yards for a touchdown. The score tied the game at 28–28 with 10:12 to go in the quarter. Tech received the post-touchdown kickoff and gained two quick first downs, but after advancing the ball beyond its own 40-yard line, was forced to punt it back to California.

With the momentum shifting in the Golden Bears' favor and a chance to take the lead, it took California three plays to earn a touchdown from its 34-yard line. Rodgers completed a 42-yard pass, then a 14-yard pass, and Adimchinobe Echemandu ran the ball in to the end zone from the Virginia Tech 10-yard line. The score gave California its first lead since the first drive of the game, and with 5:52 remaining in the quarter, the scoreboard read 35–28, California. Following the touchdown, Virginia Tech received the ball and had its first three and out of the game. Tech was forced to punt after running three plays for four yards.

California received the ball at its 41-yard line and used the good field position to its advantage. After two short-gain plays, Rodgers completed a 16-yard pass and a 24-yard toss to drive the Bears inside the Virginia Tech 20-yard line. Echemandu rushed the ball twice for seven total yards, then Rodgers ran it himself the remaining nine yards for another California touchdown. The touchdown and extra point gave California a 42–28 lead, its largest in the game. Virginia Tech received the ball with 41 seconds remaining in the quarter, and ran four quick plays. After Bryan Randall threw two incompletions, he connected with Ernest Wilford on a long 23-yard pass, and Kevin Jones rushed up the middle of the field for another 12 yards. As time expired in the quarter, Tech was inside California territory for the first time since the beginning of the quarter and had a first down. At the end of the third quarter, California held a 42–28 lead.

=== Fourth quarter ===
Virginia Tech opened the fourth quarter in possession of the ball, facing a first down at the California 45-yard line. Two short plays resulted in seven yards, then Kevin Jones rushed for a 15-yard gain. On the next play, Bryan Randall completed a 22-yard toss to receiver Keith Willis for a touchdown. The score and extra point cut California's lead to 42–35, and there were 13 minutes and 35 seconds remaining in the game.

California received the ball at its 35-yard line following the post-touchdown kickoff and a short return. The Bears began to run out the clock, rushing the ball more than passing it, as had been the trend throughout the game. Though Aaron Rodgers completed four passes during the drive for 38 yards, J. J. Arrington and Vincent Strang rushed the ball a total of eight times during the possession. California ran 7:09 off the clock before Vincent Strang broke free for a 13-yard rush that resulted in a touchdown. The score restored California's 14-point lead, making the game 49–35 with 6:26 remaining.

Needing to score quickly, Virginia Tech's subsequent drive consisted primarily of pass plays. Marcus Vick quarterbacked the first play of the drive, but his pass fell incomplete and he was replaced by Bryan Randall on subsequent plays. Randall completed his first three passes of the drive for 46 yards, pushing the Hokies into California territory. Kevin Jones picked up another first down on two rushes, then Randall completed a 28-yard pass to Chris Shreve for a touchdown that cut California's lead to 49–42. The drive took just two minutes off the clock, leaving 4:26 remaining in the game. California received the post-touchdown kickoff and went three and out, leaving plenty of time for a potential game-tying Virginia Tech drive.

This turned out to be unnecessary, however, as Tyler Fredrickson's punt was returned 52 yards by Virginia Tech's DeAngelo Hall for a touchdown. Hall's return tied the game at 49–49, and with 3:11 remaining in the game, California took over on offense. On his first play after receiving Virginia Tech's post-touchdown kickoff, Aaron Rodgers was sacked by the Virginia Tech defense and fumbled the ball. The Bears' Chris Murphy jumped on the ball, preventing what otherwise might have been a game-losing turnover. Rodgers recovered from the fumble by completing three straight passes: first to J. J. Arrington for 11 yards, then to Brandon Hall for 18 yards and a first down, then to Burl Toler for 22 yards and another first down. The last play took California deep into Virginia Tech territory. At the Tech 20-yard line, Rodgers rushed for a five-yard gain, then prepared the offense for a potential game-winning field goal kick. With two seconds remaining on the clock, California called timeout and sent in kicker Tyler Fredrickson. Despite an attempt by Virginia Tech to ice the kicker by calling its final timeout, Fredrickson was undeterred by the pressure and his 35-yard field goal sailed through the goalposts as time expired. The kick gave California three points and the 52–49 victory.

== Final statistics ==
Statistical comparison
| | VT | CAL |
|---|---|---|
| 1st downs | 27 | 27 |
| Total yards | 551 | 530 |
| Passing yards | 398 | 394 |
| Rushing yards | 153 | 136 |
| Penalties | 6–40 | 4–25 |
| 3rd down conversions | 8–12 | 13–17 |
| 4th down conversions | 0–0 | 0–0 |
| Turnovers | 0 | 0 |
| Time of possession | 22:45 | 37:15 |

For his performance in the 2003 Insight Bowl, California quarterback Aaron Rodgers was named the offensive player of the game. Rodgers completed 27 of his 35 passes for 394 yards and two touchdowns in the winning effort. Rodgers' performance tied Cal's bowl records for most completions, most touchdowns, and most rushing touchdowns, and was the third-highest offensive output by a single player in California history. The victory was California's first bowl win since a victory over Iowa in the 1993 Alamo Bowl. California kicker Tyler Fredrickson's game-winning score was his only field goal kick during the game, but he also had seven extra-point kicks for seven points. In addition, he served as California's punter, kicking the ball 4 times for 159 total punting yards. He set school records for most extra points in a season and most extra points attempted. Virginia Tech kicker Carter Warley missed three field goals: a 40-yarder, 45-yarder, and a 28-yarder. He successfully kicked four extra points for four points. Virginia Tech quarterback Bryan Randall finished the game having completed 24 of his 34 pass attempts for 398 yards and four touchdowns.

On the ground, Virginia Tech running back Kevin Jones led all rushers with 16 carries for 153 yards and a touchdown. He finished the game having set school records for most rushing yards in a season, most 100-yard rushing games in a season, and most yards averaged per carry in a career. Leading the Golden Bears on the ground was J. J. Arrington, who finished the game with 11 carries for 34 yards. Two other California players—Adimchinobe Echemandu and quarterback Aaron Rodgers—also had more than 30 yards rushing. Echemandu had one rushing touchdown, and Rodgers earned two.

Virginia Tech receiver Ernest Wilford caught 8 passes for 110 yards, setting school records for career pass receptions with 126, most receptions in a bowl game, and most receptions in a season (56). Tech's Marcus Vick, normally a quarterback, was put into the game several times as a wide receiver. He caught four passes for 82 yards and a touchdown. California wide receiver Chase Lyman led all receivers statistically, finishing with five receptions for 149 yards and a touchdown. Burl Toler had the most California receptions, catching six passes for 84 yards. Lyman's total was a career-high for him and a California bowl game record.

Virginia Tech's offense broke or tied 14 school bowl records, either individually or as a team. In addition to the ones already noted, the Hokies' 18 first downs by passing, 398 yards passing, 551 yards of total offense, 24 passes completed, 49 points scored and four passing touchdowns were also new school bowl records. Tech's 26 rushing plays were the fewest in a Virginia Tech bowl game. California's offense set school bowl records for most points (52), total yards (530), passing yards (394), completion percentage (77.1%, 27-of-35), touchdowns (seven), and rushing touchdowns (five).

On defense, California's Ryan Gutierrez was named the defensive player of the game. He led all defensive players with 12 tackles in the game.

== Postgame effects ==
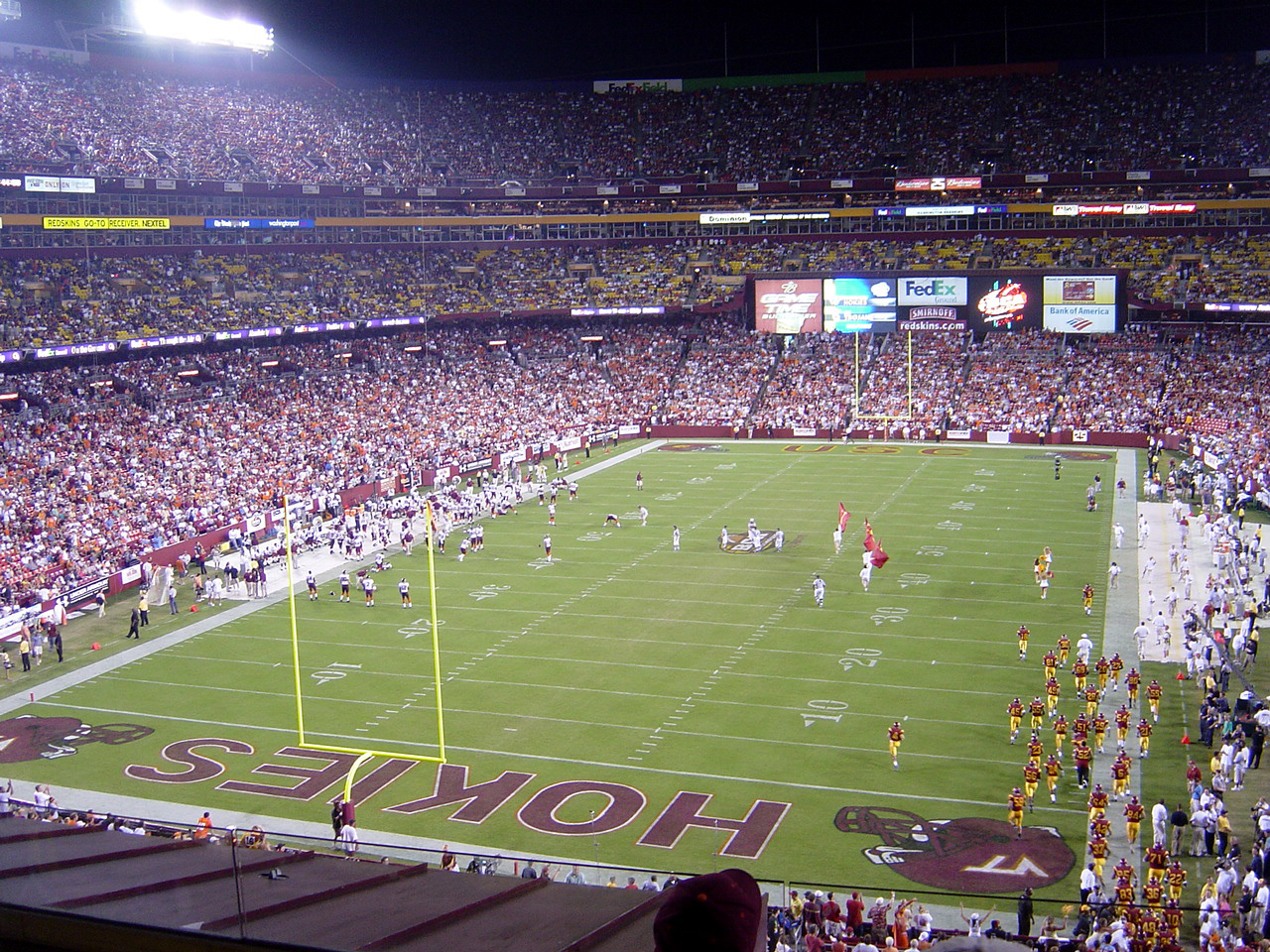
Virginia Tech played in the 2004 BCA Classic, the first game of the 2004 season, at FedExField in Landover, Maryland.

California's win raised it to a final record of 8–6, while Virginia Tech's loss dropped it to a final record of 8–5. The Hokies' five losses represented their worst season since 1997, when they went 7–5. Virginia Tech and California's combined score—101 points—represented the second-highest scoring bowl game without an overtime period in NCAA history, behind only the 2001 GMAC Bowl.

Several players from each team were selected in the 2004 NFL draft. California's Mark Wilson and Adimchinobe Echemandu were selected in the fifth and seventh rounds, respectively. Virginia Tech had five players selected: DeAngelo Hall and Kevin Jones were both taken in the first round, Jake Grove was selected in the second, Ernest Wilford in the fourth, and Nathaniel Adibi in the fifth.

One day before the Insight Bowl, Virginia Tech was selected as a participant in the 2004 Black Coaches Association Classic, which traditionally was the first college football game of the season. Virginia Tech's opponent in that game was Southern California, whom the Hokies' Insight Bowl opponents, California, defeated during the 2003 regular season.

== Sources ==
- Tandler, Rich. Hokie Games: Virginia Tech Football Game by Game 1945–2006. Game by Game Sports Media (September 15, 2007) ISBN 978-0-9723845-2-0
