= Alex Daniels =

American gridiron football player (born 1986)

No. 92
- Position: Defensive end

Personal information
- Born: November 27, 1986 (age 39); Lorain, Ohio, U.S.
- Listed height: 6 ft 4 in (1.93 m)
- Listed weight: 259 lb (117 kg)

Career information
- High school: Columbus (OH) Brookhaven
- College: Cincinnati
- NFL draft: 2010: undrafted

Career history
- Oakland Raiders (2010)*; Dallas Cowboys (2010–2011)*; Chicago Rush (2012)*; New Orleans Saints (2012)*; Edmonton Eskimos (2012); Cleveland Gladiators (2014)
- * Offseason or practice squad member only

Career CFL statistics
- Total tackles: 8
- Stats at CFL.ca (archived)
- Stats at Pro Football Reference

Alex Daniels (born November 27, 1986) is an American former football defensive end. He was signed by the Oakland Raiders as an undrafted free agent in 2010.

== College career ==
Daniels spent his first two years at Minnesota before transferring to Cincinnati due to legal issues. He sat out the 2007 season, and played 2 more years at Cincinnati. He played fullback, running back, and linebacker at Minnesota, before transferring to Cincinnati where he played defensive tackle.

== Professional career ==
=== Oakland Raiders ===
Daniels went undrafted in the 2010 NFL draft. He later signed with the Oakland Raiders to play defensive end. Shortly into training camp, they moved him to fullback, and then back to defensive end. He was waived/injured on September 4, 2010, and cleared waivers and reverted to injured reserve. They waived him with an injury settlement on September 15, 2010.

=== Dallas Cowboys ===
Daniels signed to the Dallas Cowboys' practice squad on October 5, 2010, after a workout with the team earlier in the day. He was moved back to fullback, and also played tight end. He was cut on November 24, 2010. The Cowboys re-signed him to the practice squad on November 29, 2010, when Andrew Sendejo was promoted to the active roster. He was switched back to defensive end. Daniels was released from the practice squad on December 29, 2010. He was re-signed after the season on January 3, 2011. He was waived/injured on August 16, and after clearing waivers, reverted to injured reserve on August 19. He was released from injured reserve with an injury settlement on September 1.

=== New Orleans Saints ===
Daniels signed with the New Orleans Saints on July 31, 2012.

=== Edmonton Eskimos ===
Daniels was signed by the Eskmos on September 25, 2012.
