= Wyatt Rhodes Architects =

Arizona based architecture firm

Wyatt/Rhodes Architects was an architecture firm based in Phoenix, Arizona, which specialized in the design of health care and k-12 educational projects, with an emphasis in projects for Native American communities.

The firm was founded in 1982 by Burke B. Wyatt and Michael J. Rhodes, and ceased operations in 2011.

== Significant Projects ==
Significant health care projects included; Fort Defiance Comprehensive Health Care Facility in Fort Defiance, Arizona (with ADP inc.), Winnebago Comprehensive Health Care Facility in Winnebago, Nebraska, and the Sonoma County Indian Health Project Outpatient Facility in Santa Rosa, California.

Notable educational projects for the Phoenix Union High School district included significant renovations and additions to North High School (1989 and 1992) and Camelback High School (1995 and 2001; razed since). The firm also completed several K-12 schools in Native American and rural Arizona communities including Rock Point Community School, several projects in Jeddito, Arizona and Parker, Arizona.

Other projects included contributions to the design of Chase Field (formerly Bank One Ballpark) by Ellerbe Becket.

== Influences ==
Both founding partners spent time in their early years under the tutelage of prominent architects. As a young designer, Burke Wyatt was mentored by legendary Phoenix architect Ralph Haver. During his early years in New York, Mike Rhodes worked in the office of famed modern architect Edward Durell Stone.

== Michael Rhodes Life (1941-2011) ==
Mike was born in Owensboro, Kentucky on July 11, 1941. His family moved to Phoenix in 1954. He graduated from St Mary's High School in 1959 and earned his architectural degree from Arizona State University in 1965. He served in the Arizona Air National Guard from 1965 to 1971. Mike retired in 2006. At age 69, after challenging the ravages of ALS for two years, Mike succumbed to the disease on Friday, February 4, 2011.

== Publications ==
Our Home - Giving Form to Traditional Values; Design Principles for Indian Housing, Burke Wyatt as part of AICAE Workshop. Sponsored by AICAE, National Endowment for the Arts and HUD.
