= Chase Field =

Stadium in Phoenix, Arizona, U.S.

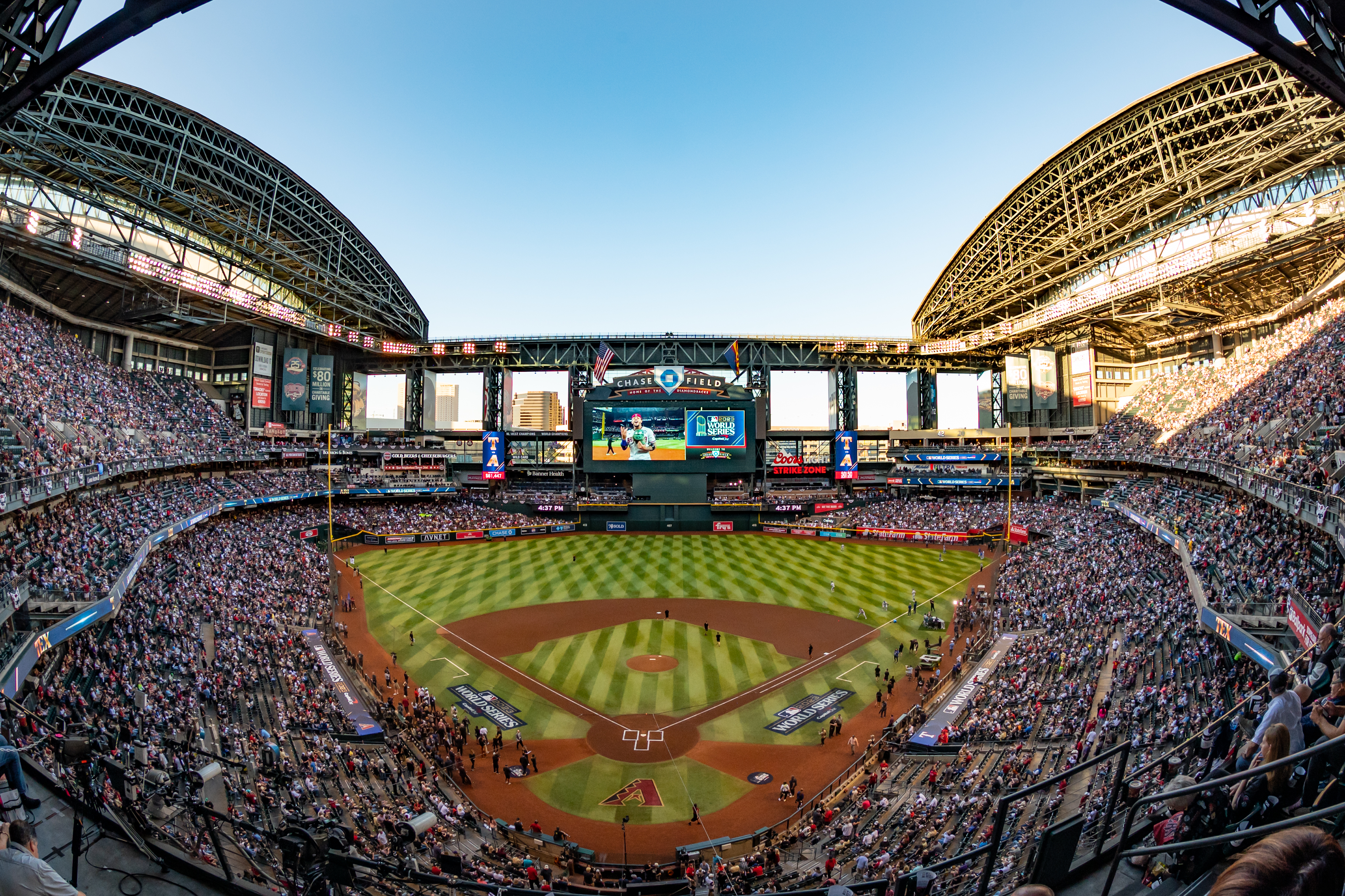
- Chase Field during the 2023 World Series

- Location in Arizona Location in the United States
- Former names: Bank One Ballpark (1998–2005)
- Address: 401 East Jefferson Street
- Location: Phoenix, Arizona, U.S.
- Coordinates: 33°26′43″N 112°4′1″W
- Owner: Maricopa County Stadium District
- Operator: SMG
- Capacity: 48,330 (since 2023); 48,405 (2020–2022); 48,418 (2019); 48,618 (2018); 48,686 (2017); 48,519 (2015–2016); 48,633 (2011–2014); 48,652 (2009–2010); 48,711 (2008); 49,033 (2002–2007); 48,500 (1998–2001)
- Roof: retractable
- Surface: grass (1998–2018) artificial (since 2019)
- Record attendance: Baseball – 50,180 (August 31, 2019); Concert – 53,400 (October 9, 2023; Pink's Summer Carnival)
- Field size: Left Field – 330 ft (101 m); Left-Center – 374 ft (114 m); Left-Center (deep) – 413 ft (126 m); Center Field – 407 ft (124 m); Right-Center (deep) – 413 ft (126 m); Right-Center – 374 ft (114 m); Right Field – 334 ft (102 m)
- Public transit: 3rd Street/Jefferson (eastbound); 3rd Street/Washington (westbound)

Construction
- Groundbreaking: November 16, 1995
- Opened: March 31, 1998
- Cost: $354 million ($699 million in 2025 dollars)
- Architects: Ellerbe Becket; Wyatt/Rhodes; Castillo Company; Cox James
- Project manager: Huber, Hunt & Nichols Inc.
- Structural engineers: Martin/Martin Consulting Engineers, Inc. Moving Systems Engineer: Hatch Associates Ltd.
- Services engineer: M-E Engineers Inc.
- General contractor: Perini/McCarthy
- Main contractor: Schuff Steel Company

Tenants
- Arizona Diamondbacks (MLB) (since 1998); Rate Bowl (NCAA) (2000–2005, 2016-2025)

Website
- mlb.com/dbacks/ballpark

Chase Field, formerly Bank One Ballpark, is a retractable roof stadium in downtown Phoenix, Arizona, United States. It is the ballpark of Major League Baseball's Arizona Diamondbacks. It opened in 1998, the year the Diamondbacks debuted as an expansion team. Chase Field was the first stadium built in the United States with a retractable roof over a natural grass playing surface, although it has used artificial turf since 2019.

== History ==
The park was built during a wave of new, baseball-only parks in the 1990s. Although nearly all of those parks were open-air, it was taken for granted that a domed stadium was a must for a major-league team to be viable in the Phoenix area. Phoenix is by far the hottest major city in North America; the average high temperature during baseball's regular season is 99.1 °F (37.3 °C), and game-time temperatures well above 100 °F (38 °C) are common during the summer.

=== Stadium funding ===
In the spring of 1994, the Maricopa County Board of Supervisors approved a 0.25 percentage point increase in the county sales tax to pay for their portion of the stadium funding. That happened during a huge county budget deficit and lack of funding for other services. The sales tax was very unpopular with local citizens, who were not permitted to vote on funding a baseball stadium with general sales tax revenue (use of public subsidies for stadium projects was prohibited by a 1989 referendum). The issue was so controversial and divisive that, in August 1997, Maricopa County Supervisor Mary Rose Wilcox was shot and injured while leaving a county board meeting by Larry Naman, a homeless man, who attempted to argue in court that her support for the tax justified his attack. In May 1998, Naman was found guilty of attempted first-degree murder.

The cost of the stadium was estimated at $279 million in 1995, but cost overruns, in part because of rising prices for steel and other materials, pushed the cost to $364 million. As part of the stadium deal, the Diamondbacks were responsible for all construction costs over $253 million. The extra expenses, combined with the Diamondbacks and the other expansion franchise, the Tampa Bay Devil Rays, not being allowed to share in national MLB revenue for their first five years of operations, left the Diamondbacks in a less-than-desirable financial situation, which came back to haunt team founder and managing partner Jerry Colangelo and his group.

=== Since 1996 ===
Construction on the park began in 1996, and was finished just before the Diamondbacks' first season, in 1998. It was the third MLB stadium to have a retractable roof and the first in the United States (at the time, only Toronto's SkyDome (Rogers Centre) and Montreal's Olympic Stadium had them; others since are Daikin Park in Houston, American Family Field in Milwaukee, Globe Life Field in Arlington, T-Mobile Park in Seattle, and LoanDepot Park in Miami). It was also the first ballpark to feature natural grass in a retractable roof stadium.

The stadium hosted Games 1, 2, 6, and 7 of the 2001 World Series between the Arizona Diamondbacks and the New York Yankees. The Diamondbacks won all four home games, winning the title in seven games, and thus denying the Yankees a fourth consecutive championship. It was only the third time that the home team won all games of a World Series, with the other two instances occurring in 1987 and 1991, both by the Minnesota Twins.

In March 2006, Chase Field played host to three first-round games of the World Baseball Classic.

Chase Field hosted the Major League Baseball All-Star Game in 2011.

Chase Field hosted the 2017 National League Wild Card Game between the Diamondbacks and Colorado Rockies. This was the D-Backs' first appearance in the postseason as a Wild Card team. The D-Backs won 11–8 and advanced to the 2017 NLDS against the Los Angeles Dodgers but were swept in three games. Game 3 was held at Chase Field, when the D-Backs lost 3–1.

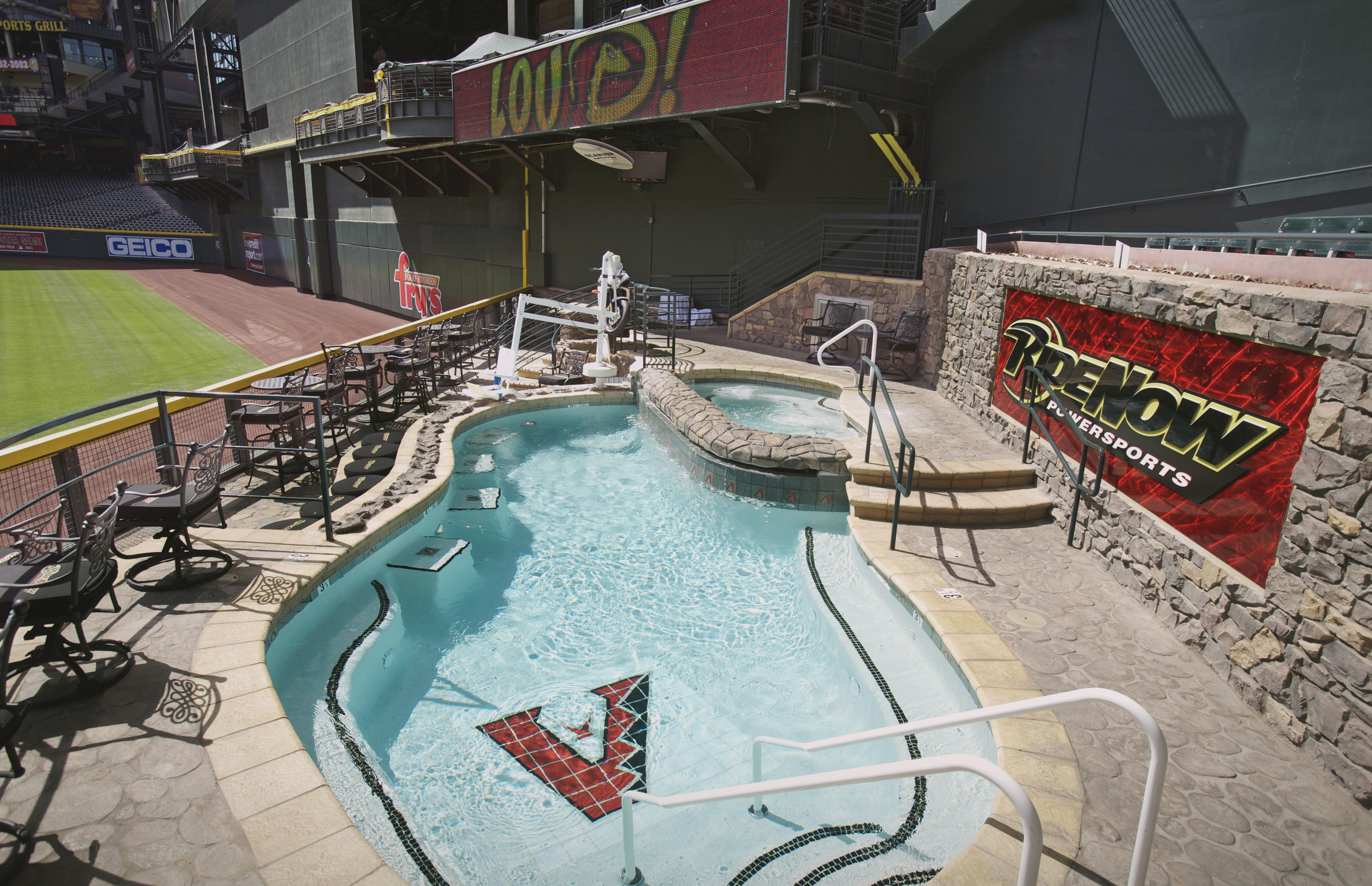
The pool at Chase Field as it appeared in 2009

Chase Field has a swimming pool located in right-center field, which is rented to patrons as a suite holding 35 guests for $3,500 per game during the 2011 season. Mark Grace was the first player to hit a home run into the pool. Besides baseball, the pool has been used by Monster Jam's Jim Koehler to continue his tradition of swimming after Freestyle. The pool which opened with the stadium in 1998, was redesigned in the offseason leading up to the 2005 season.

The ballpark featured a dirt strip between home plate and the pitcher's mound until 2019. This dirt strip, sometimes known as the "keyhole", was very common in old-time ballparks up to 1938. The dirt strip was removed when synthetic turf was installed. Comerica Park was the only other park to have one until 2025.

The park's foul territory is somewhat larger than that for most ballparks built in the 1990s. With 80% of the seats in foul territory, the upper deck is one of the highest in the majors. The park's suites are tucked far under the third deck, which keeps the upper deck closer to the action, with the exception of the Dugout Suites which sit next to the home and visitor's dugouts.

Before the 2008 season began, an HD scoreboard was installed beyond center field, replacing the original. The new scoreboard is 46 ft (14 m) high and 136 ft (41 m) wide and cost $14 million. At the time, it was the fifth-largest HD screen in Major League Baseball, behind Kauffman Stadium. The screen at Kauffman is larger in area and is square, but Chase Field's screen is wider and rectangular.

Premium seating includes 4,400 club seats, 57 suites, 6 party suites, Executive suite, batters box suite, two dugout suites, and a swimming pool.

The Diamondbacks and St. Louis Cardinals game on September 24, 2019, was the longest game in Chase Field's history. It lasted six hours and 53 minutes, involving 19 innings.

On October 12, 2018, the Diamondbacks announced that they would replace their natural grass surface with a synthetic surface from Shaw Sports Turf for the 2019 season. In 2019, leaked images of a potential new stadium by architectural firm MEIS Architects were briefly online before being removed by the firm.

The stadium hosted the third, fourth and fifth games of the 2023 World Series between the Diamondbacks and the Texas Rangers.

In September 2025, Arizona House Bill 2704 was formally signed into law which would allow sales tax dollars to fund renovations of the stadium.

=== Naming rights ===
The stadium was called Bank One Ballpark when Bank One of Chicago, Illinois (who had acquired locally based Valley National Bank of Arizona in 1992), purchased naming rights for $100 million over 30 years. After Bank One merged with New York-based JPMorgan Chase & Co. in 2005, Chase assumed the naming rights and the stadium's name was changed to Chase Field.

== Other events ==
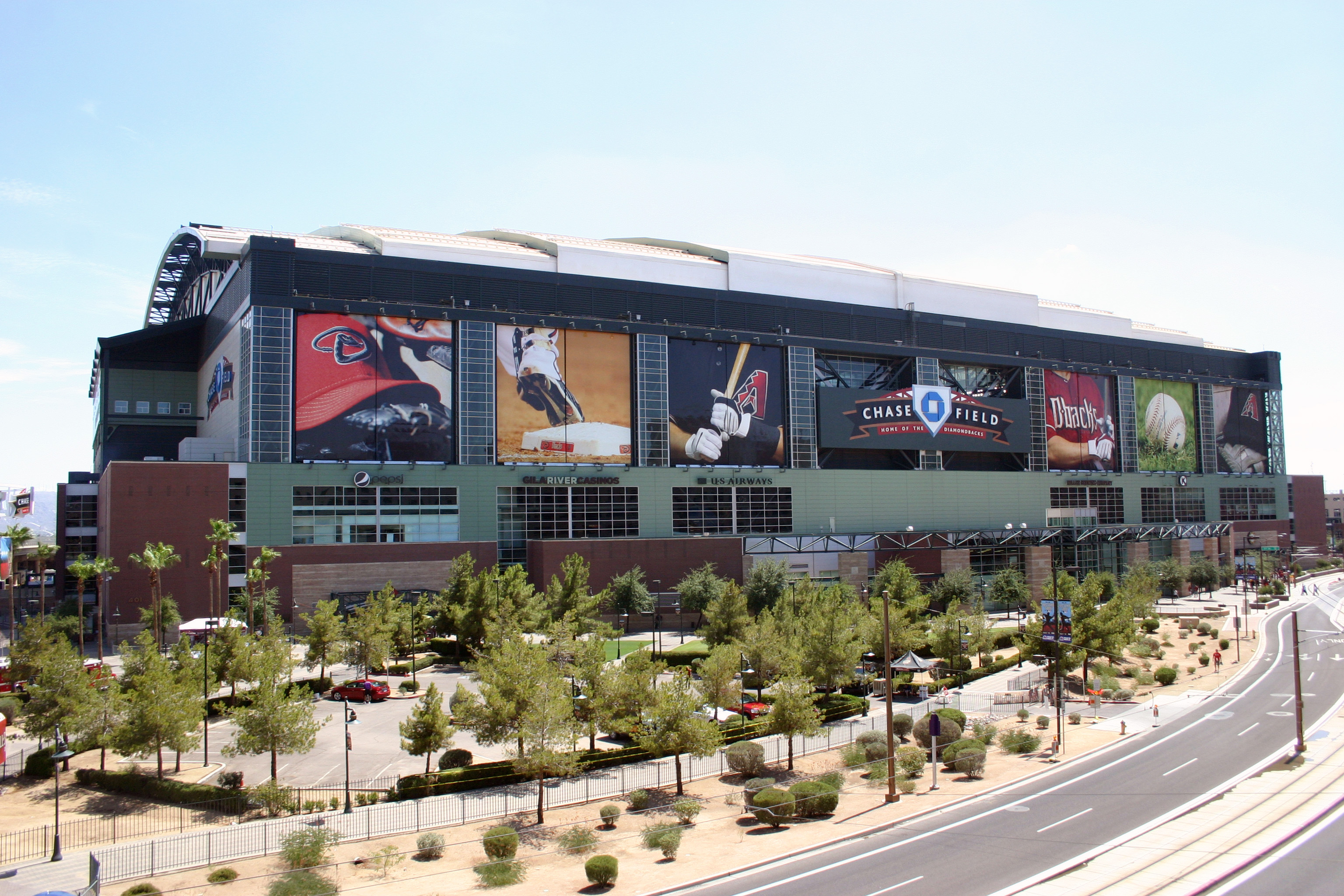
Chase Field as viewed from the north

The stadium hosts occasional concerts and international soccer games. For football and soccer, the field is set up with the end lines perpendicular to the third-base line and temporary bleachers added on the east side.

=== International baseball tournaments ===
Chase Field has hosted first-round games in the 2006 and 2013 World Baseball Classic tournaments, and hosted first round games in the 2023 tournament, from March 11, 2023, to March 15, 2023, which was postponed from 2021 due to the COVID-19 pandemic.

=== College sports ===
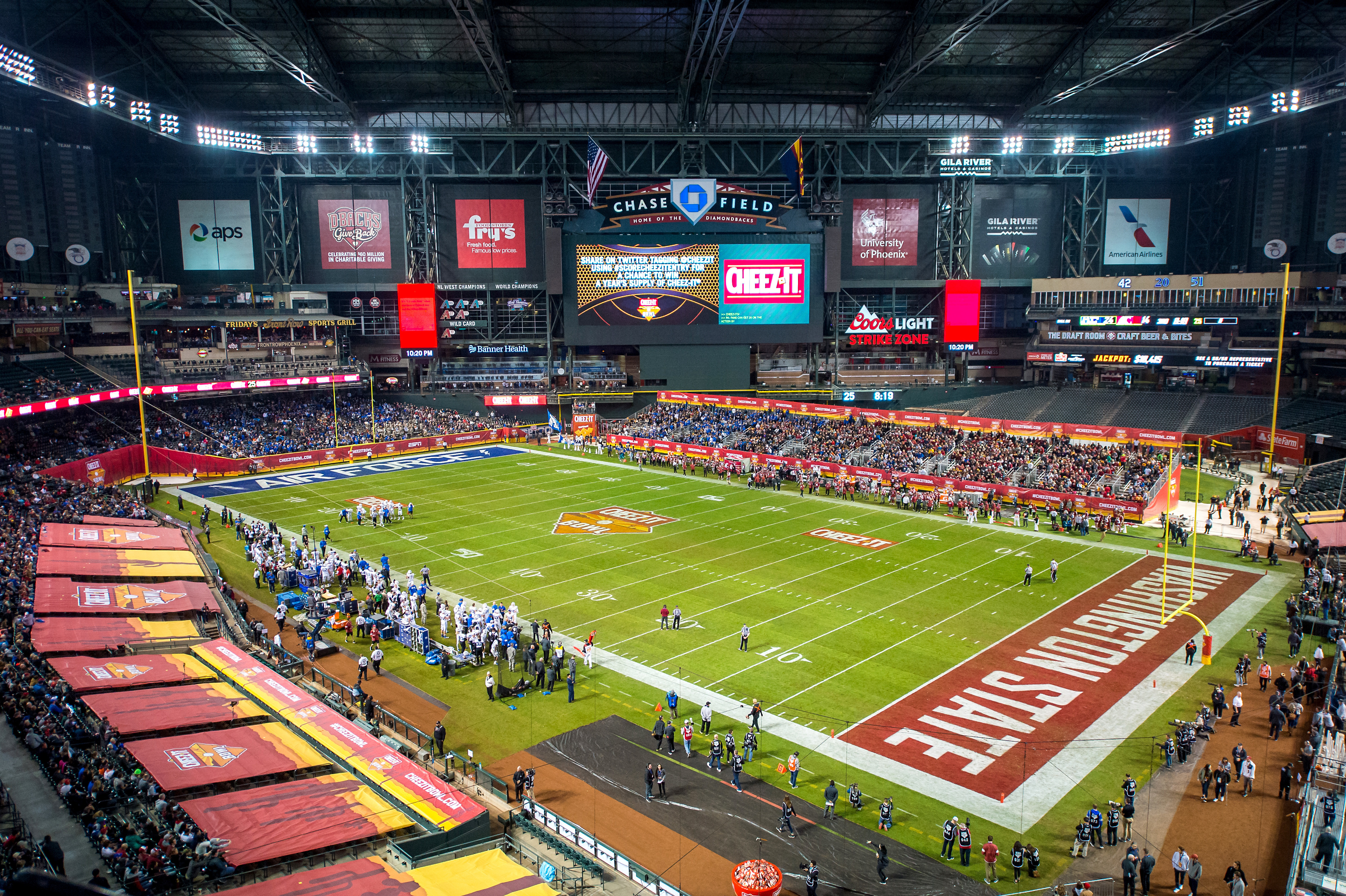
Chase Field before the 2019 Cheez-It Bowl

The organizers of the Insight.com Bowl moved the game from Arizona Stadium in Tucson to Phoenix beginning in December 2000, and Chase Field became the game's host. After hosting six editions of the game, the bowl game moved to Sun Devil Stadium in Tempe, to replace the Fiesta Bowl, which had moved to State Farm Stadium in Glendale. The bowl, which has undergone several naming changes, remained in Tempe for nine playings, then returned to Chase Field starting with the January 2016 edition while Sun Devil Stadium began undergoing a series of renovations; the game was played in Phoenix through its 2025 playing, after which the organizers announced it would be returning to Tempe at the now-reduced capacity and renamed Mountain America Stadium.

Chase Field has staged nine women's college basketball games. The second game, played on December 18, 2006, was shortened by rain with four minutes and 18 seconds remaining and Arizona State leading Texas Tech 61–45. Venue staff closed the roof in an effort to finish the game, but officials deemed the court unsafe. In 2000, ASU played the Tennessee Volunteers at the same facility.

In 2006, Chase Field was the site of an annual "Challenge at Chase", a college baseball game between Arizona State and University of Arizona that lasted two years. The Arizona Wildcats won both contests in 2006 and 2007.

=== Concerts ===
Date	Artist	Opening act(s)	Tour / Concert name	Attendance	Revenue	Notes
December 31, 1998	Black Sabbath	Pantera; Megadeth; Slayer; Soulfly	New Years Evil			
July 18, 2001	NSYNC	Eden's Crush; Samantha Mumba; Dante Thomas	PopOdyssey Tour	42,959 / 49,111	$2,213,026	
May 7, 2016	Kenny Chesney	Miranda Lambert; Sam Hunt; Old Dominion	Spread the Love Tour	47,922 / 48,700	$3,412,908	
June 23, 2018	Kenny Chesney	Thomas Rhett; Old Dominion; Brandon Lay	Trip Around the Sun Tour	48,424 / 49,014	$3,198,416	
March 9, 2019	Billy Joel	—	Billy Joel in Concert	40,964 / 40,964	$4,837,237	
September 28, 2022	Bad Bunny	Alesso	World's Hottest Tour	49,421 / 49,421	$11,176,255	Highest grossing concert.
November 11, 2022	Elton John	—	Farewell Yellow Brick Road	99,394 combined	$15,682,863	Elton John's last concert in Arizona.
November 12, 2022	Elton John	—	Farewell Yellow Brick Road	99,394 combined	$15,682,863	Elton John's last concert in Arizona.
July 19, 2023	Morgan Wallen	Hardy; Ernest; Bailey Zimmerman	One Night At A Time World Tour			
July 20, 2023	Morgan Wallen	Hardy; Ernest; Bailey Zimmerman	One Night At A Time World Tour			
October 9, 2023	Pink	Brandi Carlile; Grouplove; Kid Cut Up	Pink Summer Carnival 2023	53,400 / 53,400	$7,800,000	First female headliner at the venue.
October 9, 2023	Pink	Brandi Carlile; Grouplove; Kid Cut Up	Pink Summer Carnival 2023	53,400 / 53,400	$7,800,000	Highest concert attendance.
December 8, 2023	Billy Joel	Stevie Nicks	Billy Joel in Concert			
August 23, 2024	Def Leppard; Journey	Steve Miller Band	The Summer Stadium Tour			
September 18, 2024	Green Day	The Smashing Pumpkins; Rancid; The Linda Lindas	The Saviors Tour			
September 11, 2025	Chris Brown	Summer Walker; Bryson Tiller	Breezy Bowl XX	47,476	$8,007,329	
August 19, 2026	Noah Kahan	Gigi Perez Annabelle Dinda	The Great Divide Tour			
August 18, 2027	Slipknot	Bring Me The Horizon; Motionless in White	(sic)est Stadium Tour			

=== Bull riding ===
In February 2006, the Professional Bull Riders hosted a Built Ford Tough Series bull riding event at this venue. Chris Shivers won this event with a total score of 181.5 points (out of a possible 200) on two bulls, including an impressive 93.75 (out of 100) points on Taylor Made bucking bull, Smokeless Wardance, in the short-go round. During the long-go round, the roof was closed, but during the short-go, the roof was opened.

=== Supercross ===
The stadium has hosted Monster Energy Supercross rounds from 1999 to 2015. Monster Jam came to Chase Field every year in late January about two weeks after Monster Energy Supercross. Both events moved to the University of Phoenix Stadium in 2016.

=== Wrestling ===
WWE hosted the Royal Rumble at Chase Field on January 27, 2019, marking nearly 16 years that a WWE event was held at a baseball stadium since WrestleMania XIX at Safeco Field in Seattle and the first Royal Rumble to be held outdoors.

=== International women's soccer ===
Date	Competition	Team	Res	Team	Crowd
December 17, 2000	Women’s International Friendly	United States	1–1	Japan	12,039
November 12, 2008	International Friendly	Mexico	2–1	Ecuador	unknown

Events and tenants
Preceded by None	Home of the Arizona Diamondbacks; 1998 – present	Succeeded by Current
Preceded by Arizona Stadium; Sun Devil Stadium	Home of the Guaranteed Rate Bowl; 2001–2005; 2015 – present	Succeeded by Sun Devil Stadium; Current
Preceded by Angel Stadium of Anaheim	Host of the Major League Baseball All-Star Game; 2011	Succeeded by Kauffman Stadium

== Roof and cooling system ==
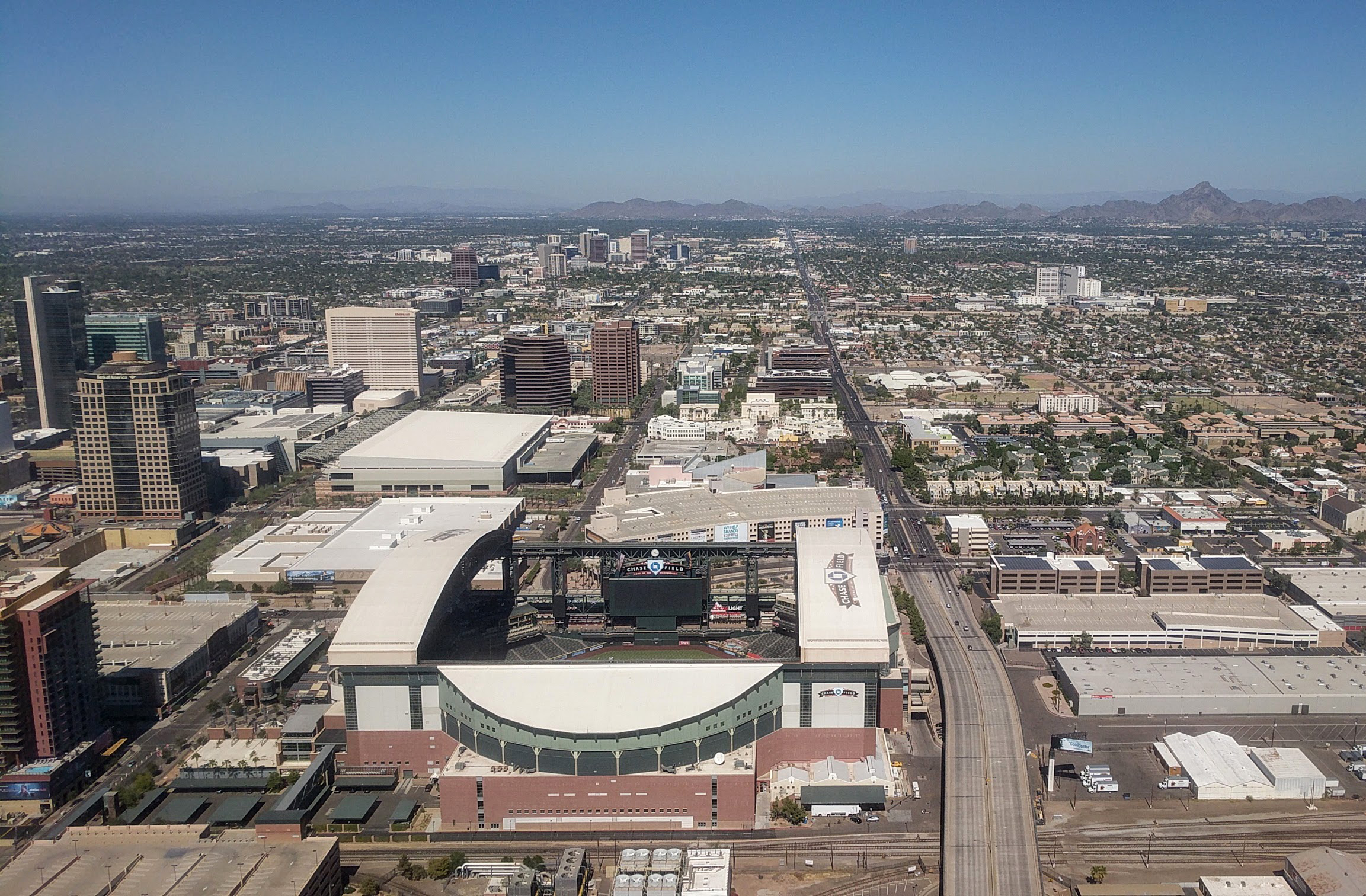
Aerial view of Chase Field and Phoenix from the south, on approach to Phoenix Sky Harbor International Airport

Chase Field's roof is opened or closed depending on the game-time temperature. Even with the roof closed, the park's windows allow enough sunlight to play in daylight without overheating the stadium. The roof takes about 4½ minutes to open or close at a cost of $2–$3.

While the ballpark had a grass surface, the roof would be kept open to expose the turf to sunlight. When necessary, it would be closed three hours before game time using two 200-horsepower motors triggered from a control room in the upper deck above left-center field. A massive HVAC system then dropped the temperature inside the park to about 78 °F (25.5 °C) by the time the gates opened. The chilled-water system, which has cooling power sufficient for 2,500 homes of 2,000 square feet (190 m^{2}), also serves more than 30 buildings in downtown Phoenix. The cooling plant, located in a separate building next to the ballpark, freezes water overnight to reduce daytime electricity demand. Originally, the HVAC system did not cool above row 25 of the upper level, exposing fans in the higher rows to the brunt of Phoenix' oppressive summer heat. Subsequent improvements kept virtually all of the facility in air-conditioned comfort. Following the introduction of a synthetic playing surface, the roof is kept mostly closed and is opened only on game days when weather permits, greatly reducing the facility's demand on the HVAC system.

Panoramic of Diamondbacks vs. Rockies game July 2, 2017

== Transportation ==
Chase Field is served by the A Line at 3rd Street/Jefferson and 3rd Street/Washington station of the Valley Metro Rail & Streetcar system.

== Climate ==
Chase Field

Climate chart (precipitation, max. and min. temperature)
J	F	M	A	M	J	J	A	S	O	N	D
23 19 6	25 21 7	48 25 9	24 29 11	6 32 14	1 33 15	3 36 17	8 36 18	8 36 18	6 30 14	24 24 9	54 18 6
- █ Average max. and min. temperatures in °C
- █ Precipitation totals in mm
Imperial conversion
J	F	M	A	M	J	J	A	S	O	N	D
0.9 66 43	1 70 45	1.9 77 48	0.9 84 52	0.2 90 57	0 91 59	0.1 97 63	0.3 97 64	0.3 97 64	0.2 86 57	0.9 75 48	2.1 64 43
- █ Average max. and min. temperatures in °F
- █ Precipitation totals in inches
