= Columbus Global Academy =

School in Columbus, Ohio, United States

Location
- 4077 Karl Rd. Columbus, (Franklin County), Ohio 43224; United States
- Coordinates: 40°3′2″N 82°58′53″W

Information
- Type: Public, Coeducational middle-high school
- Opened: 2008
- Founder: Ken Woodward
- School district: Columbus City Schools
- Superintendent: Angela Chapman
- Principal: Derick Vickroy
- Grades: 6-12
- Team name: Columbus Global Lions
- Website: columbusglobalacademy.ccsoh.us

Columbus Global Academy, commonly referred to as CGA, is a public school located in Columbus, Ohio. It is part of the Columbus City Schools district. The school opened in 2008, but the Columbus City Schools ESL program from which it was formed was founded in 1999. Its purpose is to educate immigrant students e.g. students who are new to the U.S.

== Background ==
Columbus Global Academy is a relatively new school, and it is an aggregation of smaller ESL schools throughout the Columbus City Schools district. The school opened in 2008 as a high school, and gained its Columbus Global Academy name in 2009. That same year, a middle school was added to it from Mifflin. It is currently the only exclusively ESL school in the Columbus City Schools district, and is also the largest school of its kind in the nation. However, a state report in Spring of 2015 pointed out a number of issues with the program, which resulted in the school being returned to its pre-2009 status as a two-year academic program. In 2015, CGA was moved from its former location in the Linmoor Middle School building. Its current location is in the Brookhaven High School building on Karl Road, and the ESL program offices are also housed in the same building.

== Academics ==
The Columbus Global Academy is a middle/high school, grades 6–12. The main focus of the ESL program is to facilitate student learning within five designated skill areas: listening, speaking, reading, writing and cultural enrichment. Students at the Global Academy receive ESL support in mathematics, English language arts, reading, science, technology, music, visual art, and physical education. Aside from the core curriculum, advanced high school students at CGA are able to enroll in AP and PSEO for college credits. Teachers at CGA receive on-going specialized training in teaching English language learners.

== Student population ==
The students of the Global Academy come from a variety of backgrounds with the uniting factor being that most students speak English as a second (or more) language.

There are more than 91 dialects and languages spoken at CGA, including Amharic, Arabic, Chinese, Fulani, French, Mai Mai, Nepali, Portuguese, Somali, Spanish, and Swahili. Over 55 countries are represented, including: Afghanistan, Algeria, Bangladesh, Bhutan, Brazil, Burma, Burundi, China, Colombia, Congo, Dominican Republic, Ecuador, El Salvador, Eritrea, Ethiopia, Gambia, Ghana, Guatemala, Guinea, Honduras, Iraq, Jordan, Kenya, Laos, Liberia, Mali, Mauritania, Mexico, Morocco, Myanmar, Nepal, Nicaragua, Palestine, Puerto Rico, Saudi Arabia, Senegal, Sierra Leone, Somalia, Sudan, Tanzania, Venezuela, Vietnam, and Yemen. Every continent is represented in CGA's student body except for Australia and Antarctica.
