= Ryan Gutierrez =

American football player (born 1982)

Profile
- Position: Safety

Personal information
- Born: January 23, 1982 (age 44); Fresno, California, U.S.

Career information
- High school: Clovis (CA)
- College: California

Career history
- 2006–2007: La Courneuve Flash (CED1)

Ryan Gutierrez (born January 23, 1982) is an American former football player.

== College career ==
Gutierrez played college football at the University of California at the safety position, where he was a two-year starter. He earned honorable mention All-Pac-10 honors during the 2003 season, and was the Defensive MVP of the 2003 Insight Bowl.

== Professional ==
He played the 2006–2007 seasons for the La Courneuve Flash in France top league Championnat Élite Division 1.
