= Dominic Jones =

American football player and coach (born 1987)

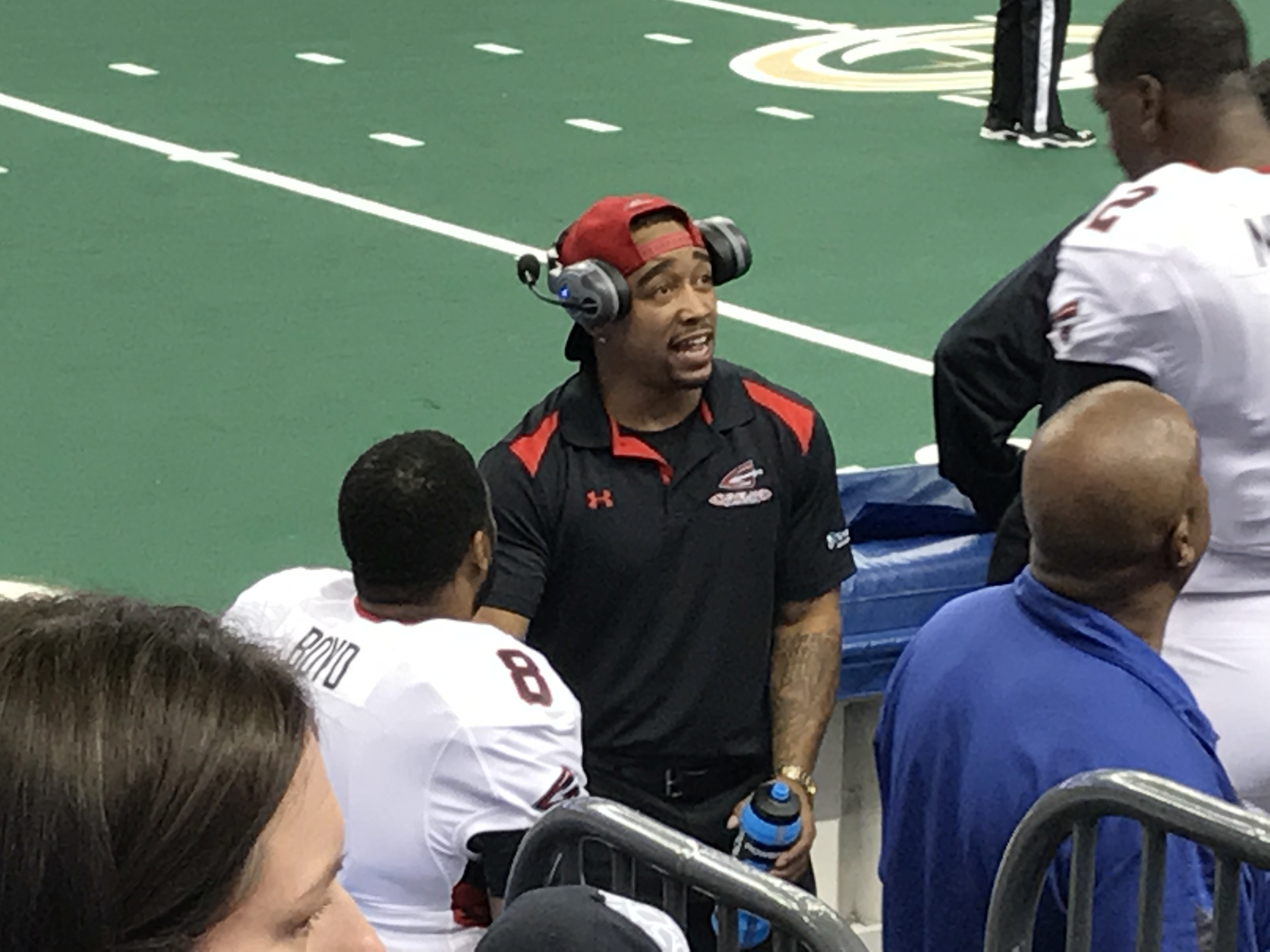
- Jones in 2017

No. 2
- Position: Defensive back

Personal information
- Born: January 18, 1987 (age 39); Columbus, Ohio, U.S.
- Listed height: 5 ft 9 in (1.75 m)
- Listed weight: 190 lb (86 kg)

Career information
- High school: Columbus (OH) Brookhaven
- College: Otterbein
- NFL draft: 2011: undrafted

Career history

Playing
- Cleveland Gladiators (2012); Orlando Predators (2013); Cleveland Gladiators (2014–2015)

Coaching
- Cleveland Gladiators (2016) Defensive backs coach; Cleveland Gladiators (2017) Assistant head coach/Director of football operations

Awards and highlights
- Second Team All-Arena (2013)

Career AFL statistics
- Tackles: 335
- Interceptions: 9
- Forced fumbles: 5
- Kick return yards: 3,072
- Total touchdowns: 7
- Stats at ArenaFan.com

Dominic Jones (born January 18, 1987) is an American former football defensive back. He played college football at the University of Minnesota. He attended Brookhaven High School in Columbus, Ohio.

== Early life ==
Born the son of Keith Jones and DaMona Lipsey, Jones played high school football for the Brookhaven High School Bearcats. As a senior in 2004, Jones helped lead the Bearcats to an Ohio Division II State Championship. Jones received scholarship offers from Michigan State, Minnesota and Pittsburgh.

== College career ==
=== University of Minnesota ===
Jones chose to continue his football career for the University of Minnesota. Jones saw playing immediately for the Gophers, appearing in all 12 games as a true freshman. He was 6th on the team with 55 tackles on the season, while also leading the team in punt return yards. As a sophomore in 2006, Jones was the starting strong safety for the Golden Gophers, starting at 13 games. He tied for second on the team with 82 tackles, while also serving as the team's primary kickoff and punt returner.

=== Masturbation video incident and criminal sexual conduct conviction ===
In July 2007, Jones allegedly appeared on videotape masturbating on an unconscious female teenager along with two other males. He was acquitted of rape and eventually convicted of felony sexual conduct. In July 2009, an appeals court upheld Jones' conviction, but reduced his four year prison sentence, which was even higher than the usual recommended guidelines the felony, to time he already served.

=== Otterbein College ===
After serving one year in a Hennepin County workhouse, Jones enrolled at Otterbein College, where he was given a chance to join the football program. Jones earned first team All-America, All-Region, and All-Ohio Athletic Conference in his lone season with the Cardinals.

== Professional career ==
=== Cleveland Gladiators ===
Jones joined the Cleveland Gladiators of the Arena Football League on October 20, 2011.

=== Orlando Predators ===
Jones signed with the Orlando Predators on November 5, 2012. He returned 88 kicks for 1,751 yards and four touchdowns during the 2013 season, earning Second Team All-Arena honors as a kick returner.

=== Return to Gladiators ===
Jones was traded to the Cleveland Gladiators on February 18, 2014.

== Coaching career ==
Jones was named the defensive backs coach of the Cleveland Gladiators on March 3, 2016. In December 2016, he was promoted to assistant head coach and director of football operations.
