= Forest Park (Columbus, Ohio) =

Community in Columbus, Ohio, United States

Coordinates: 40.0765°N 82.9705°W

Interactive map of the neighborhood

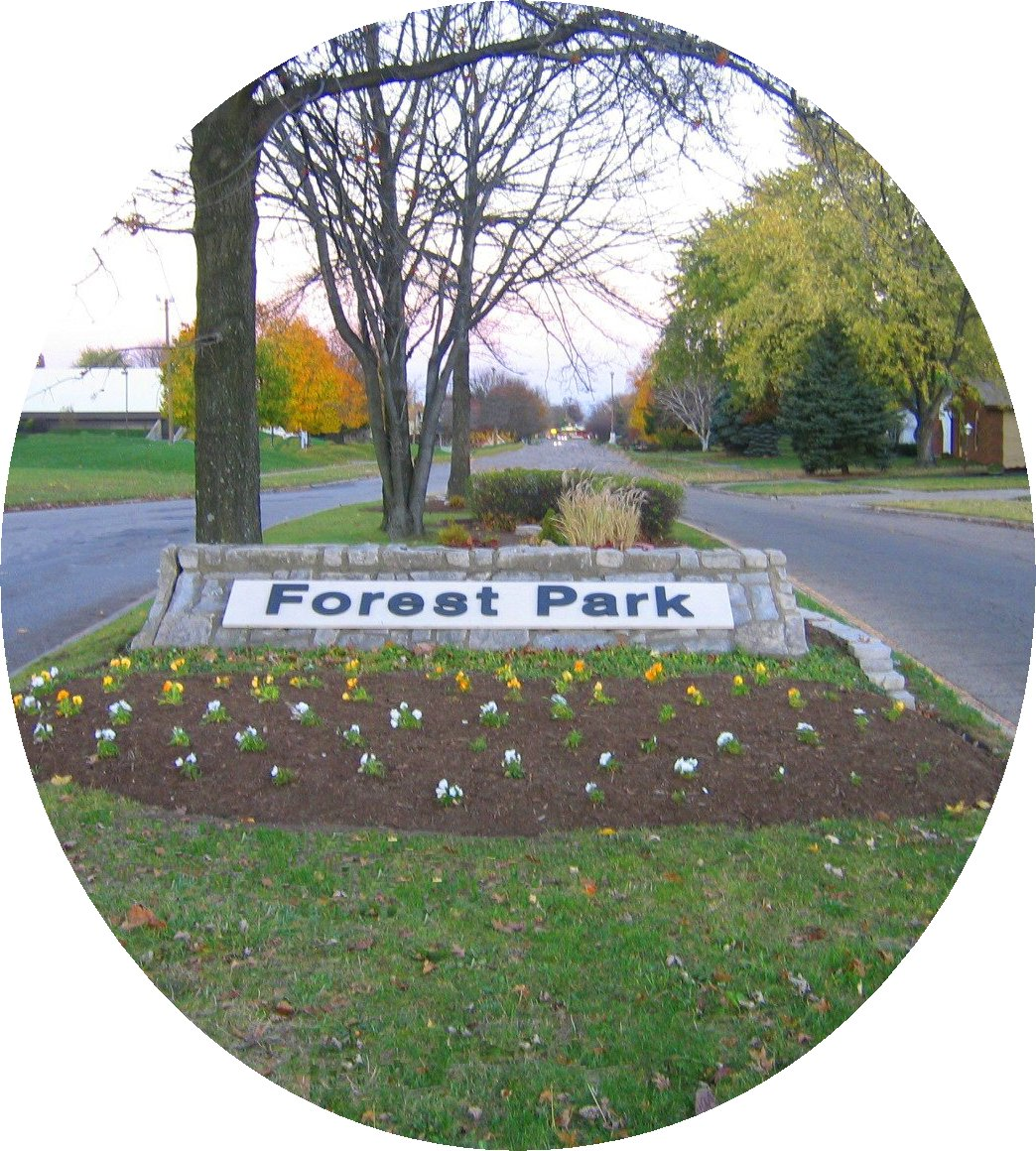
Entrance of Forest Park.

The community of Forest Park consists of almost 2900 private residential properties (single-family homes and duplexes), plus apartments, condominiums, commercial properties, city-owned parks and schools, in approximately 1.4 square miles (3.6 km^{2}) of the Northland area of northeast Columbus, Ohio. These properties adjoin a total of 132 distinct streets and courts maintained by the City of Columbus. The community's approximate center is near the intersection of Karl Road and Sandalwood Place in Columbus.

== History ==
The region that includes Forest Park was originally awarded by President John Adams to James Hamilton in payment for his military service during the Revolutionary War. The land was subsequently sold, subdivided, and used primarily as farmland well into the 20th century.

Forest Park was developed beginning in the late 1950s by the Metzger Brothers Company, founded in 1955. Metzger Brothers, which was dissolved in 1980, also developed Devonshire and several other communities in the Northland area. During this period, the city of Columbus expanded significantly by way of annexation beyond its 1950 boundaries. The construction of the North Freeway (a segment of Interstate 71) immediately west of Forest Park stimulated new residential and commercial development in the area.

The majority of homes in Forest Park West (west of Karl Road) were built in the 1960s. In the early years of the decade, it was the site of a Parade of Homes. Forest Park West's development largely coincided with the construction and expansion of the Northland Mall, which opened as the first shopping mall in Columbus in 1964 and was a significant contributor to employment and the area economy for 38 years. The Mall closed in 2002 and a new retail and government complex, Northland Village, has been developed on the site. The aircraft manufacturing facilities of North American Aviation, later known as North American Rockwell and Rockwell International, near Port Columbus also employed many residents of Forest Park and nearby communities during the 1960s, 1970s and early 1980s. These facilities closed in 1988.

Development of Forest Park East followed in 1965 and continued throughout the 1970s. In the mid-1970s, E. Dublin-Granville Road (SR-161) was reconstructed as a divided highway, though the portion just north of Forest Park remains a major commercial and retail corridor. A portion of the Forest Park East community near Cleveland Avenue, known officially as Minerva Park Place, was developed later by Layman Homes and was incorporated into the civic association service area in the late 1990s.

Forest Park was selected as the first beneficiary of the Neighborhood Pride neighborhood improvement program of the City of Columbus in 2000. A portion of the community was again designated as a Neighborhood Pride area in late 2010.

== Features ==
Homes in Forest Park reflect a variety of architectural styles and floor plans typical of homes built in the 1960s and 1970s, including ranch, split-level and two-story homes with two, three and four bedrooms. The large number of different home builders involved in the original development contributes to significant diversity in home styles and finishes. Nearly all have basements (many finished) and attached or enclosed garages. The average lot size is 0.2 acres (800 m^{2}). Most homes are on quiet side streets, courts or "loops." Homes on collector and arterial streets reflect the same styles and quality. These streets include Sandalwood Boulevard and Satinwood Drive in Forest Park West, and Sandalwood Place, Tamarack Boulevard, Northtowne Boulevard and Maple Canyon Avenue in Forest Park East. Tamarack Circle in Forest Park East is an unusual, distinctively designed large roundabout that serves as the hub of the neighborhood. It has a small commercial district at its core and is surrounded on three sides by a large apartment complex.

Nearly every street in Forest Park is lined with trees (hence the name) in city-owned tree lawns and most individual parcels also include one or more mature trees. Street names are mostly derived from species of trees (though not necessarily descriptive of the trees found along them). Virtually every street in Forest Park has sidewalks on both sides of the street, which was not typical of construction during this period in Columbus.

The Metzger Brothers Company developed Forest Park as a well-planned, self-contained community. In 1961, Forest Park West was the first residential neighborhood in Columbus, and among the first in the nation, to incorporate internal shopping and recreation (including a swimming pool and bowling center), making it virtually self-sufficient. Forest Park East also included its own central shopping and recreation district at Tamarack Circle. Both centers originally included private community swimming pools; both have since closed and one is now the site of a self-storage facility.

Today, the community's two internal shopping centers include restaurants, a bowling center, convenience stores, health and child care, self-storage facilities, and other light retail and service businesses. It is served by and helps support the East Dublin-Granville (SR-161) and Morse Road retail corridors, as well as the Polaris and Easton retail complexes.

Five schools are located in Forest Park proper (Avalon, Parkmoor and Forest Park Elementary Schools, Northland High School and independent K-12 Marburn Academy) and several other public and private schools are within a 1 mile (2 km) radius of the community's center. A branch of the Columbus Metropolitan Library, a recreation facility operated by the YMCA and several churches are located on Karl Road, near the center of the community. The city-owned Woodward Park and Nature Preserve of 49 acres (200,000 m^{2}), which includes a recreation center, athletic fields, tennis courts, picnic areas and a walking trail, forms the southern boundary of Forest Park West, and several smaller city parks of up to 5 acres (20,000 m^{2}) are located within and adjacent to Forest Park East.

Subdivisions located adjacent to or near Forest Park East (developed separately but often considered part of the greater Forest Park neighborhood) include Granville Manor, Kilbourne Woods, Northland Park, Northland Park Estates, Scotland, Suburban Homesites and Villa Park.

== Location ==
Forest Park is located in the Northland region of northeast Columbus, Ohio (Franklin County), north of Morse Road, south of Ohio State Route 161, east of Interstate 71, and west of Cleveland Avenue. Karl Road separates Forest Park East and West. Forest Park is approximately 8 miles (13 km) NNE, and 12 miles (19 km) by highway, from the center of downtown Columbus (Broad & High Streets). Nearby communities include the cities of Westerville (to the northeast) and Worthington (to the northwest) and the village of Minerva Park (to the east). The entire community is within the Columbus city limits, Sharon Historic Township, the Northland planning district, the Columbus City school district, area codes 614 and 380, and ZIP (postal) code 43229. The approximate geographic center of the community is located at 40.0765 (N) latitude, -82.9705 (W) longitude.

== Civic Association ==
The Forest Park Civic Association (FPCA) was founded as a not-for-profit Ohio corporation in April 1962 and continues to provide services to and advocate for residents of the community. It is funded by voluntary dues paid by households and businesses in the community during an annual membership drive. The Forester, the Forest Park newsletter, averages 24 pages and is delivered to more than 3500 homes in and around Forest Park every month except February. It is free of charge to area residents and largely self-supporting through advertising by local businesses. The FPCA also publishes a triennial Forest Park Directory of residents, provided at no additional charge to paid-member households.

FPCA was one of the founding community members of the Northland Community Council in 1964 and continues as one of more than 25 NCC member communities.

== See also ==
- Neighborhoods in Columbus, Ohio
- Northland High School
