= Brookhaven High School (Columbus, Ohio) =

Location
- 4077 Karl Road; Columbus, (Franklin County), Ohio 43224; USA; 40°3′2″N 82°58′53″W

Information
- Type: Public, Coeducational high school
- Opened: 1963
- Closed: 2014 (aged 50–51 years)
- School district: Columbus City Schools
- Superintendent: Dan Good
- Principal: Duane Bland
- Grades: 9–12
- Colors: Navy Blue and Gold
- Fight song: Drive On Bearcats
- Athletics conference: Columbus City League
- Mascot: Bearcat
- Team name: Bearcats
- Rival: Beechcroft
- Accreditation: North Central Association of Colleges and Schools
- Website: School Website (Wayback Machine)

Brookhaven High School was a public high school located on the northeast side of Columbus, Ohio, United States. The school was a part of the Columbus City Schools system and opened in 1963. The school colors were navy blue and gold, and the school nickname was the Bearcats.

Since 2004, the school had been participating in the Small schools movement. Brookhaven was divided into three small schools: Leadership, North Star, and Legacy. Plans for creating a middle school were announced many years before its closing but were never finalized. After a decision made by the Columbus City Schools District, they announced that Brookhaven would be shut down by the end of the 2013-14 year due to declining population. With it, five elementary schools were closed as well. On May 29, 2014, Brookhaven closed its doors for the last time due to a failed levy. The building is now used by Columbus Global Academy.

== Ohio High School Athletic Association State Championships ==
- Football – 2004
- Boys Basketball – 2002
- Girls Basketball – 1996
- Girls Track and Field – 1998

== Notable alumni ==
- Jamelle Cornley, Retired forward professional basketball player
- Jeff Cumberland, Retired tight end for the New York Jets (NFL)
- Alex Daniels (born 1986), defensive lineman in the Arena Football League, member of 2004 state championship football team.
- Helen Darling, Retired guard for the San Antonio Silver Stars (WNBA)
- Terry Glenn, Retired NFL wide receiver; Fred Biletnikoff Award winner, 2-time Pro Bowl selection
- June Henley, Retired running back for the Los Angeles Rams (NFL)
- Chris Johnson (born 1990), basketball player in the Israeli Basketball Premier League
- Dominic Jones, Retired defensive back in the Arena Football League. Member of the 2004 state championship football team.
- Marlon Kerner, Retired cornerback for the Buffalo Bills from 1995 to 1998 (NFL)
- Paul O'Neill, Retired MLB right fielder; 5-time MLB All-Star
