= Minerva Park, Ohio =

- Village
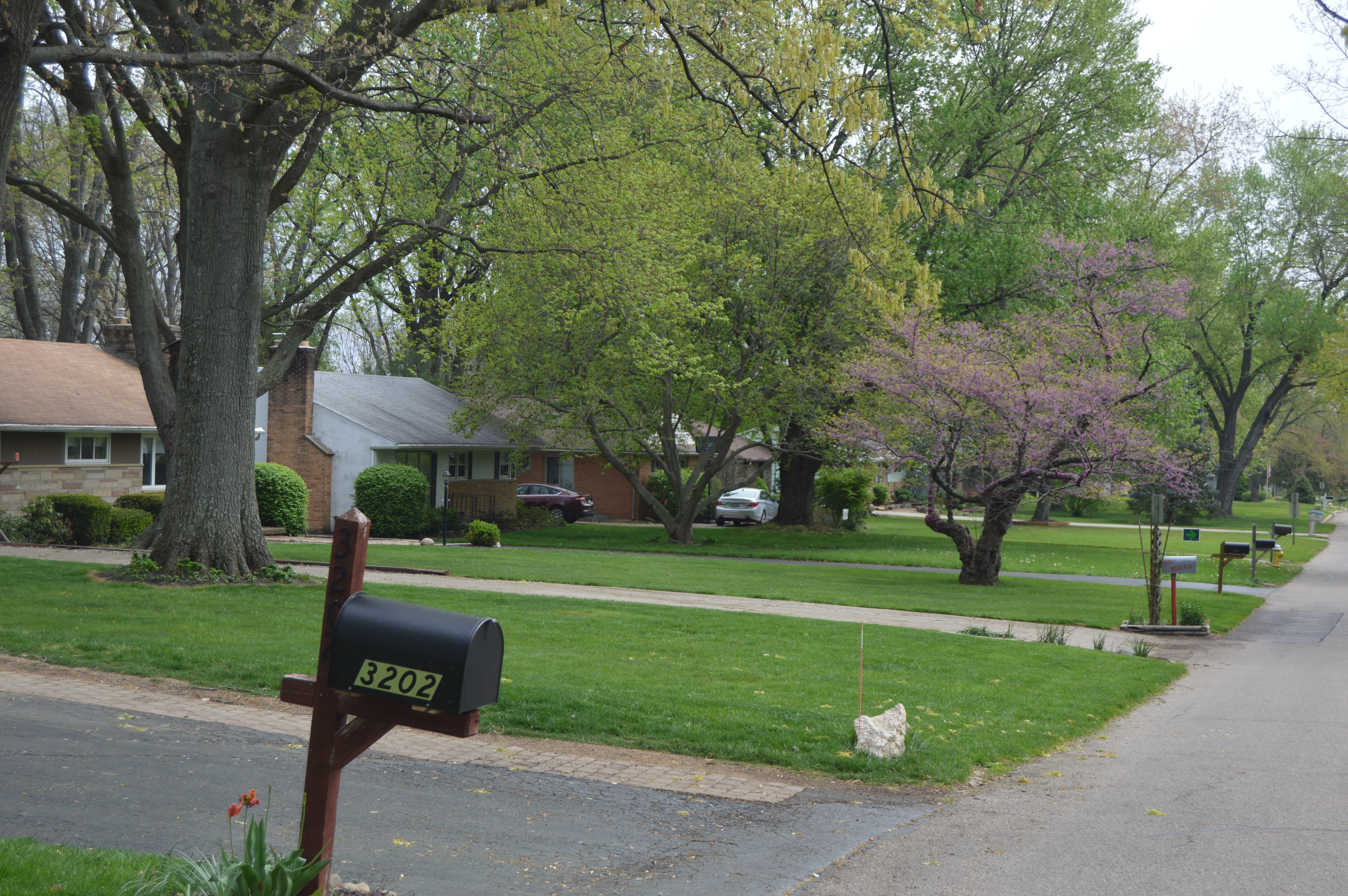
- Houses on Minerva Lake Road
- Interactive map of Minerva Park, Ohio
- Coordinates: 40°04′37″N 82°56′26″W
- Country: United States
- State: Ohio
- County: Franklin

Area
  - Total: 0.66 sq mi (1.71 km^{2})
  - Land: 0.65 sq mi (1.68 km^{2})
  - Water: 0.012 sq mi (0.03 km^{2})
- Elevation: 850 ft (260 m)

Population (2020)
  - Total: 2,009
  - Density: 3,105.6/sq mi (1,199.09/km^{2})
- Time zone: UTC-5 (Eastern (EST))
  - Summer (DST): UTC-4 (EDT)
- FIPS code: 39-50862
- GNIS feature ID: 2399373
- Website: www.minervapark.gov

Minerva Park is a village in Franklin County, Ohio, United States. The population was 2,009 at the 2020 census.

The communities of Minerva Park, Bexley, Whitehall, and Valleyview are enclaves of Columbus.

== History ==
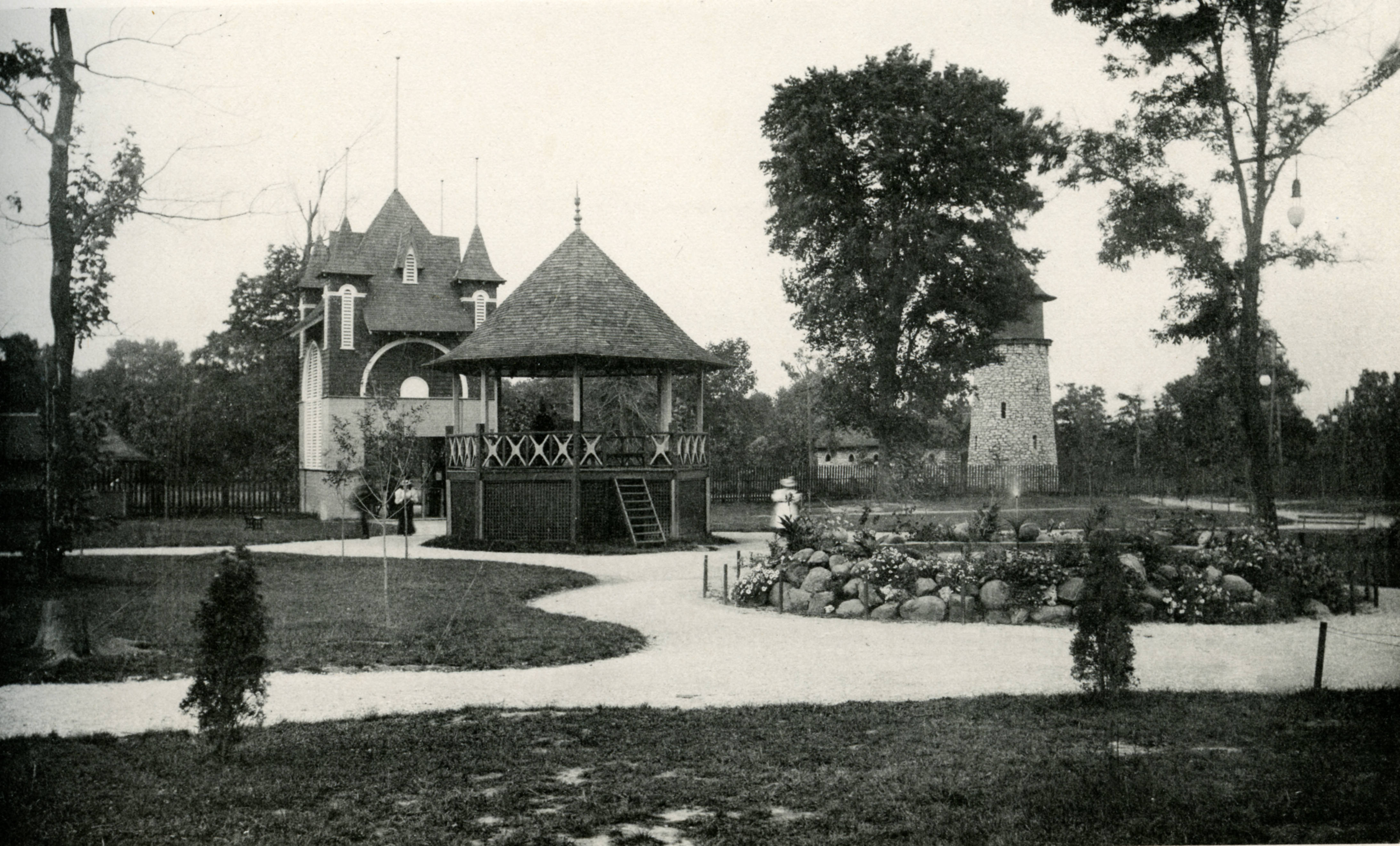
Part of the amusement park c. 1897

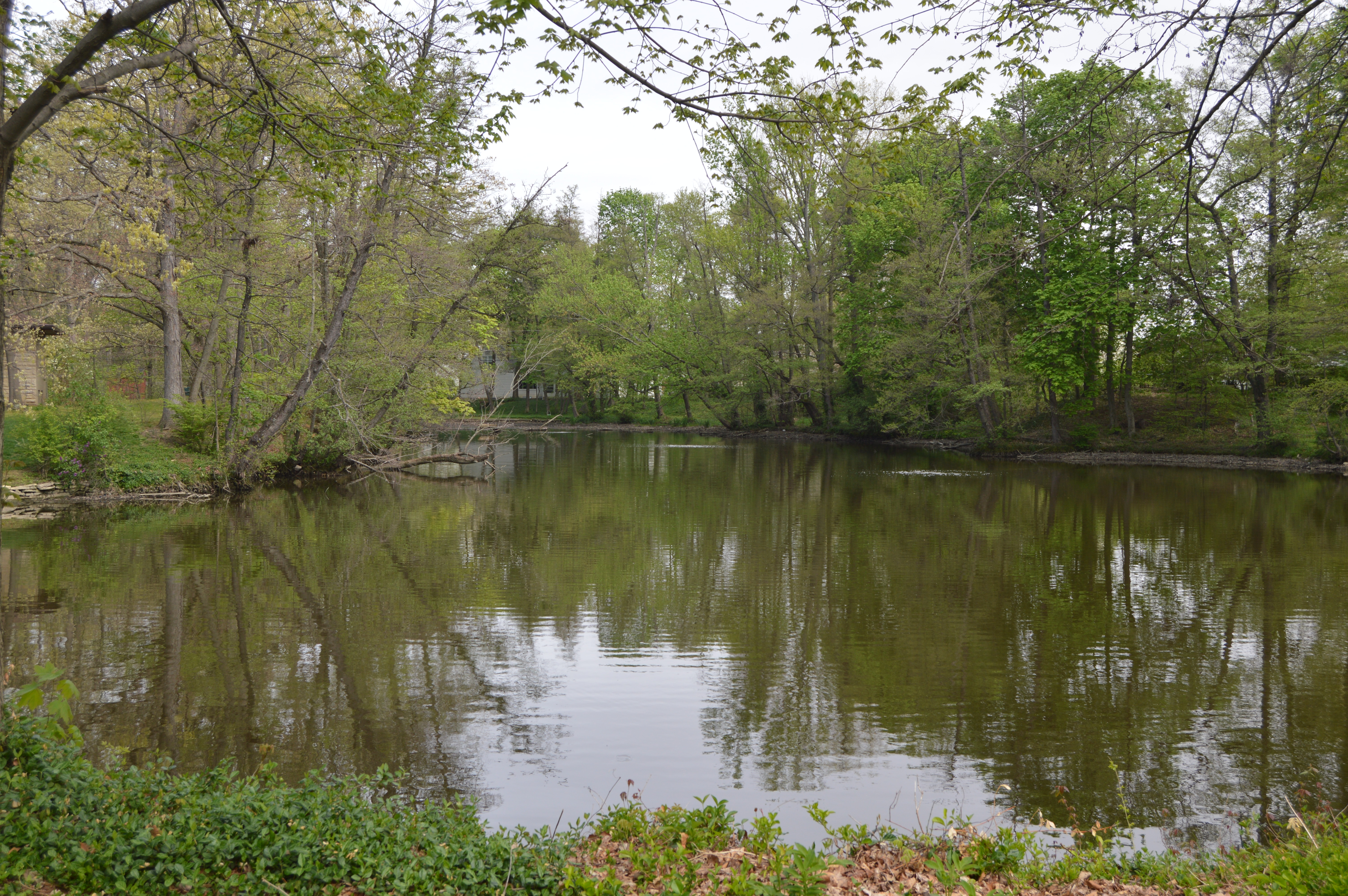
Minerva Lake

The village land was founded as a trolley park, also named Minerva Park. The park had a roller coaster, a small zoo, a lake, and other attractions. The park opened July 13, 1895. It operated until 1902, after Olentangy Park outcompeted Minerva Park. For its later history, the site became a graveyard for discarded streetcars. The park's owner unsuccessfully pleaded with Westerville to preserve the amusement park. The site was vacant until 1927, when construction of the subdivision began. The village was incorporated in 1940.

== Geography ==
According to the United States Census Bureau, the village has a total area of 0.52 square miles (1.35 km^{2}), of which 0.51 square miles (1.32 km^{2}) is land and 0.01 square miles (0.03 km^{2}) is water.

== Demographics ==
Historical population
Census	Pop.	Note	%±
1950	232		—
1960	1,169		403.9%
1970	1,402		19.9%
1980	1,618		15.4%
1990	1,463		−9.6%
2000	1,288		−12.0%
2010	1,272		−1.2%
2020	2,009		57.9%
U.S. Decennial Census 2020

=== 2010 census ===
At the 2010 census there were 1,272 people, 539 households, and 352 families living in the village. The population density was 2,494.1 inhabitants per square mile (963.0/km^{2}). There were 565 housing units at an average density of 1,107.8 per square mile (427.7/km^{2}). The racial makeup of the village was 88.5% White, 6.1% African American, 0.3% Native American, 1.7% Asian, 0.1% Pacific Islander, 0.3% from other races, and 3.0% from two or more races. Hispanic or Latino of any race were 3.2%.

Of the 539 households 27.3% had children under the age of 18 living with them, 53.8% were married couples living together, 6.9% had a female householder with no husband present, 4.6% had a male householder with no wife present, and 34.7% were non-families. 28.4% of households were one person and 13.7% were one person aged 65 or older. The average household size was 2.36 and the average family size was 2.86.

The median age in the village was 45.2 years. 19.9% of residents were under the age of 18; 4.7% were between the ages of 18 and 24; 25.2% were from 25 to 44; 31.3% were from 45 to 64; and 19% were 65 or older. The gender makeup of the village was 48.0% male and 52.0% female.

=== 2000 census ===
At the 2000 census there were 1,288 people, 545 households, and 408 families living in the village. The population density was 2,597.0 inhabitants per square mile (1,002.7/km^{2}). There were 562 housing units at an average density of 1,133.2 per square mile (437.5/km^{2}). The racial makeup of the village was 97.05% White, 0.70% African American, 0.08% Native American, 0.39% Asian, 0.39% from other races, and 1.40% from two or more races. Hispanic or Latino of any race were 0.85%.

Of the 545 households 22.8% had children under the age of 18 living with them, 64.4% were married couples living together, 7.2% had a female householder with no husband present, and 25.0% were non-families. 21.5% of households were one person and 12.1% were one person aged 65 or older. The average household size was 2.36 and the average family size was 2.72.

The age distribution was 19.5% under the age of 18, 4.5% from 18 to 24, 24.1% from 25 to 44, 28.6% from 45 to 64, and 23.2% 65 or older. The median age was 46 years. For every 100 females there were 93.4 males. For every 100 females age 18 and over, there were 91.0 males.

The median household income was $63,875 and the median family income was $67,333. Males had a median income of $47,222 versus $32,130 for females. The per capita income for the village was $29,629. About 0.7% of families and 1.3% of the population were below the poverty line, including 0.9% of those under age 18 and 2.8% of those age 65 or over.

== See also ==
- Indianola Park
- Olentangy Park
