= Virginia Tech Hokies football statistical leaders =

The Virginia Tech Hokies football statistical leaders are individual statistical leaders of the Virginia Tech Hokies football program in various categories, including passing, rushing, receiving, total offense, defensive stats, and kicking. Within those areas, the lists identify single-game, single-season, and career leaders. The Hokies represent Virginia Polytechnic Institute and State University in the NCAA's Atlantic Coast Conference.

Although Virginia Tech began competing in intercollegiate football in 1892, the school's official record book generally does not include entries from before the 1950s, as the records from this era are often incomplete and inconsistent.

These lists are dominated by more recent players for several reasons:

- Since the 1950s, seasons have increased from 10 games to 11 and then 12 games in length.
- The NCAA didn't allow freshmen to play varsity football until 1972 (with the exception of the World War II years), allowing players to have four-year careers.
- Bowl games only began counting toward single-season and career statistics in 2002. The Hokies have played in 15 bowl games since then, giving players since 2002 an extra game to accumulate statistics. Similarly, the Hokies have played in the ACC Championship Game five times since it began.
- All ten of the Hokies' 10 highest seasons in offensive output, both in yardage and scoring, have come during current head coach Frank Beamer's tenure, and eight of them have come in the 21st century.

These lists are updated through the end of the 2025 season. The Virginia Tech football record book generally does not give a full top 10 in single-game statistics.

== Passing ==
=== Passing yards ===
Career
Rank	Player	Yards	Years
1	Logan Thomas	9,003	2010 2011 2012 2013
2	Tyrod Taylor	7,017	2007 2008 2009 2010
3	Bryan Randall	6,508	2001 2002 2003 2004
4	Don Strock	6,009	1970 1971 1972
5	Will Furrer	5,906	1988 1989 1990 1991
6	Maurice DeShazo	5,720	1991 1992 1993 1994
7	Kyron Drones	5,565	2023 2024 2025
8	Sean Glennon	4,867	2004 2006 2007 2008
9	Michael Brewer	4,395	2014 2015
10	Jim Druckenmiller	4,383	1993 1994 1995 1996

Single season
Rank	Player	Yards	Year
1	Jerod Evans	3,546	2016
2	Don Strock	3,243	1972
3	Logan Thomas	3,013	2011
4	Josh Jackson	2,991	2017
5	Logan Thomas	2,976	2012
6	Logan Thomas	2,907	2013
7	Tyrod Taylor	2,743	2010
8	Ryan Willis	2,716	2018
9	Michael Brewer	2,692	2014
10	Don Strock	2,577	1971

Single game
Rank	Player	Yards	Year	Opponent
1	Don Strock	527	1972	Houston
2	Bryan Randall	504	2002	Syracuse
3	Ethan Grunkemeyer	434	2026	Pittsburgh
4	Jerod Evans	406	2016	Pittsburgh
5	Bryan Randall	398	2003	California (Insight Bowl)
6	Logan Thomas	391	2013	Boston College
7	Don Strock	385	1972	Wake Forest
8	Don Strock	376	1971	Ohio
9	Josh Jackson	372	2017	ECU
10	Logan Thomas	366	2013	Miami

=== Passing touchdowns ===
Career
Rank	Player	TDs	Years
1	Logan Thomas	53	2010 2011 2012 2013
2	Bryan Randall	48	2001 2002 2003 2004
3	Maurice DeShazo	47	1991 1992 1993 1994
4	Tyrod Taylor	44	2007 2008 2009 2010
	Kyron Drones	44	2023 2024 2025
6	Will Furrer	43	1988 1989 1990 1991
7	Jim Druckenmiller	34	1993 1994 1995 1996
8	Ryan Willis	33	2018 2019
9	Michael Brewer	31	2014 2015
10	Don Strock	29	1970 1971 1972
	Steve Casey	29	1978 1979 1980 1981
	Jerod Evans	29	2016

Single season
Rank	Player	TDs	Year
1	Jerod Evans	29	2016
2	Tyrod Taylor	24	2010
	Ryan Willis	24	2018
4	Maurice DeShazo	22	1993
5	Bryan Randall	21	2004
6	Josh Jackson	20	2017
7	Will Furrer	19	1990
	Logan Thomas	19	2011
9	Logan Thomas	18	2012
	Michael Brewer	18	2014

Single game
Rank	Player	TDs	Year	Opponent
1	Bryan Randall	5	2002	Syracuse
	Jerod Evans	5	2016	Boston College
	Josh Jackson	5	2017	ECU
4	Maurice DeShazo	4	1993	Maryland
	Maurice DeShazo	4	1993	Temple
	Michael Vick	4	1999	Rutgers
	Grant Noel	4	2001	Rutgers
	Bryan Randall	4	2003	Rutgers
	Bryan Randall	4	2003	California (Insight Bowl)
	Bryan Randall	4	2004	Florida A&M
	Ryan Willis	4	2018	Marshall
	Ryan Willis	4	2019	Boston College

== Rushing ==
=== Rushing yards ===
Career
Rank	Player	Yards	Years
1	Cyrus Lawrence	3,767	1979 1980 1981 1982
2	Kevin Jones	3,475	2001 2002 2003
3	Roscoe Coles	3,459	1974 1975 1976 1977
4	Maurice Williams	2,981	1983 1984 1985 1986
5	Branden Ore	2,776	2005 2006 2007
6	Lee Suggs	2,767	1999 2000 2001 2002
7	Dwayne Thomas	2,696	1992 1993 1994 1995
8	David Wilson	2,662	2009 2010 2011
9	Ken Oxendine	2,653	1994 1995 1996 1997
10	Eddie Hunter	2,523	1983 1984 1985 1986

Single season
Rank	Player	Yards	Year
1	David Wilson	1,709	2011
2	Ryan Williams	1,655	2009
3	Kevin Jones	1,647	2003
4	Cyrus Lawrence	1,403	1981
5	Lee Suggs	1,325	2002
6	Darren Evans	1,265	2008
7	Cyrus Lawrence	1,221	1980
8	Lee Suggs	1,207	2000
9	Khalil Herbert	1,183	2020
10	Bhayshul Tuten	1,159	2024

Single game
Rank	Player	Yards	Year	Opponent
1	Bhayshul Tuten	266	2024	Boston College
2	Darren Evans	253	2008	Maryland
3	Mike Imoh	243	2004	North Carolina
4	Kevin Jones	241	2003	Pittsburgh
5	Kenny Lewis	223	1978	VMI
6	Roscoe Coles	214	1976	Tulsa
7	Michael Vick	210	2000	Boston College
8	Jeffrey Overton Jr.	209	2026	Boston College
9	Khalil Herbert	208	2020	Duke
10	Branden Ore	207	2006	Southern Mississippi

=== Rushing touchdowns ===
Career
Rank	Player	TDs	Years
1	Lee Suggs	53	1999 2000 2001 2002
2	Kevin Jones	35	2001 2002 2003
3	Branden Ore	31	2005 2006 2007
4	Cyrus Lawrence	30	1979 1980 1981 1982
	Ryan Williams	30	2009 2010
6	James Barber	29	1971 1972 1973
	Roscoe Coles	29	1974 1975 1976 1977
8	Ken Oxendine	27	1994 1995 1996 1997
9	Bhayshul Tuten	25	2023 2024
10	Maurice Williams	24	1983 1984 1985 1986
	Dwayne Thomas	24	1999 2000 2001 2002
	Logan Thomas	24	2010 2011 2012 2013

Single season
Rank	Player	TDs	Year
1	Lee Suggs	27	2000
2	Lee Suggs	22	2002
3	Kevin Jones	21	2003
	Ryan Williams	21	2009
5	Branden Ore	16	2006
6	Bhayshul Tuten	15	2024
7	Tommy Francisco	13	1966
	James Barber	13	1972
	Ken Oxendine	13	1996
	Shyrone Stith	13	1999

Single game
Rank	Player	TDs	Year	Opponent
1	Tommy Francisco	6	1966	VMI
2	Morgan Gardner	5	1916	Roanoke
	Lee Suggs	5	2000	UCF
3	V.B. Hodgson	4	1909	Richmond
	John Martin	4	1920	Emory and Henry
	Lee Suggs	4	2000	Rutgers
	Kevin Jones	4	2003	Pitt
	Ryan Williams	4	2009	NC State
	Ryan Williams	4	2009	Virginia
	Trey Edmunds	4	2013	Miami

== Receiving ==
=== Receptions ===
Career
Rank	Player	Rec	Years
1	Cam Phillips	236	2014 2015 2016 2017
2	Isaiah Ford	210	2014 2015 2016
3	Jarrett Boykin	184	2008 2009 2010 2011
4	Danny Coale	165	2008 2009 2010 2011
5	Tre Turner	134	2018 2019 2020 2021
6	Bucky Hodges	133	2014 2015 2016
7	Ernest Wilford	126	2000 2001 2002 2003
8	Josh Morgan	122	2004 2005 2006 2007
9	Antonio Freeman	120	1991 1992 1993 1994
10	Eddie Royal	119	2004 2005 2006 2007

Single season
Rank	Player	Rec	Year
1	Isaiah Ford	79	2016
2	Cam Phillips	76	2016
3	Isaiah Ford	75	2015
4	Cam Phillips	71	2017
5	Jarrett Boykin	61	2011
6	Danny Coale	60	2011
7	Isaiah Ford	56	2014
8	Ernest Wilford	55	2003
9	Jarrett Boykin	53	2010
10	Ernest Wilford	51	2002
	Marcus Davis	51	2012
	Willie Byrn	51	2013
	Damon Hazelton	51	2018

Single game
Rank	Player	Rec	Year	Opponent
1	Cam Phillips	14	2017	ECU
2	Donald Snell	13	1985	Cincinnati
	Nick Cullen	13	1990	Southern Mississippi
4	Isaiah Ford	12	2015	Tulsa (Independence Bowl)
	Damon Hazelton	12	2018	Notre Dame
	Luke Reynolds	12	2026	Maryland
7	Isaiah Ford	11	2016	Liberty
8	Sidney Snell	10	1979	Virginia
	Jarrett Boykin	10	2011	North Carolina
	Cam Phillips	10	2016	Georgia Tech
	Isaiah Ford	10	2016	Pittsburgh

=== Receiving yards ===
Career
Rank	Player	Yards	Years
1	Cam Phillips	3,027	2014 2015 2016 2017
2	Isaiah Ford	2,967	2014 2015 2016
3	Jarrett Boykin	2,884	2008 2009 2010 2011
4	Danny Coale	2,658	2008 2009 2010 2011
5	Tre Turner	2,292	2018 2019 2020 2021
6	Ricky Scales	2,272	1972 1973 1974
7	Antonio Freeman	2,200	1991 1992 1993 1994
8	André Davis	2,094	1998 1999 2000 2001
9	Ernest Wilford	2,052	2000 2001 2002 2003
10	Marcus Davis	1,827	2009 2010 2011 2012

Single season
Rank	Player	Yards	Year
1	Isaiah Ford	1,164	2015
2	Isaiah Ford	1,094	2016
3	Cam Phillips	983	2016
4	Cam Phillips	964	2017
5	André Davis	962	1999
6	Marcus Davis	953	2012
7	Ernest Wilford	925	2002
8	Danny Coale	904	2011
9	Ernest Wilford	886	2003
10	Jarrett Boykin	847	2010

Single game
Rank	Player	Yards	Year	Opponent
1	Ernest Wilford	279	2002	Syracuse
2	Isaiah Ford	227	2015	Tulsa (Independence Bowl)
3	Ricky Scales	213	1972	Wake Forest
4	Antonio Freeman	194	1993	Temple
5	Cam Phillips	189	2017	ECU
6	Tre Turner	187	2021	Georgia Tech
7	Que'Sean Brown	182	2026	Georgia Tech
8	André Davis	172	1999	Boston College
9	Sidney Snell	171	1979	VMI
	Joshua Stanford	171	2013	Boston College

=== Receiving touchdowns ===
Career
Rank	Player	TDs	Years
1	Isaiah Ford	24	2014 2015 2016
2	Antonio Freeman	22	1991 1992 1993 1994
3	Bucky Hodges	20	2014 2015 2016
4	Ricky Scales	18	1972 1973 1974
	André Davis	18	1998 1999 2000 2001
	Jarrett Boykin	18	2008 2009 2010 2011
7	Cam Phillips	17	2014 2015 2016 2017
8	Josh Morgan	16	2004 2005 2006 2007
	Damon Hazelton	16	2018 2019
10	Sidney Snell	15	1978 1979 1980
	Carroll Dale	15	1956 1957 1958 1959

Single season
Rank	Player	TDs	Year
1	Isaiah Ford	11	2015
2	Antonio Freeman	9	1993
	André Davis	9	1999
4	Sidney Snell	8	1980
	Ricky Hall	8	1998
	Damon Hazelton	8	2018
	Damon Hazelton	8	2019
	Da'Quan Felton	8	2023
9	Ricky Scales	7	1972
	Ricky Scales	7	1973
	Sidney Snell	7	1979
	Mike Giacolone	7	1981
	Bo Campbell	7	1991
	André Davis	7	2001
	Ernest Wilford	7	2002
	Bucky Hodges	7	2014
	Isaiah Ford	7	2014
	Cam Phillips	7	2017
	Eric Kumah	7	2018

Single game
Rank	Player	TDs	Year	Opponent
1	Ernest Wilford	4	2002	Syracuse
2	Ricky Scales	3	1972	Ohio
	Antonio Freeman	3	1993	Temple
	Bucky Hodges	3	2015	Duke
	Isaiah Ford	3	2015	NC State
	Cam Phillips	3	2017	East Carolina
	Dalton Keene	3	2019	Miami

== Total offense ==
Total offense is the sum of passing and rushing statistics. It does not include receiving or returns.

=== Total offense yards ===
Career
Rank	Player	Yards	Years
1	Logan Thomas	10,362	2010 2011 2012 2013
2	Tyrod Taylor	9,213	2007 2008 2009 2010
3	Bryan Randall	8,034	2001 2002 2003 2004
4	Kyron Drones	7,363	2023 2024 2025
5	Maurice DeShazo	6,114	1991 1992 1993 1994
6	Don Strock	5,871	1970 1971 1972
7	Will Furrer	5,773	1988 1989 1990 1991
8	Steve Casey	4,987	1978 1979 1980 1981
9	Sean Glennon	4,695	2004 2006 2007 2008
10	Jim Druckenmiller	4,646	1993 1994 1995 1996

Single season
Rank	Player	Yards	Year
1	Jerod Evans	4,392	2016
2	Logan Thomas	3,500	2012
3	Logan Thomas	3,482	2011
4	Tyrod Taylor	3,402	2010
5	Josh Jackson	3,315	2017
6	Logan Thomas	3,251	2013
7	Don Strock	3,170	1972
8	Ryan Willis	3,070	2018
9	Kyron Drones	2,902	2023
10	Bryan Randall	2,775	2004

Single game
Rank	Player	Yards	Year	Opponent
1	Don Strock	516	1972	Houston
2	Bryan Randall	495	2002	Syracuse
3	Jerod Evans	439	2016	Pittsburgh
4	Logan Thomas	429	2013	Boston College
5	Ethan Grunkemeyer	419	2026	Pittsburgh
6	Logan Thomas	408	2013	Miami (FL)
7	Bryan Randall	390	2003	California (Insight Bowl)
8	Don Strock	386	1971	Ohio
	Don Strock	386	1972	Wake Forest

=== Total touchdowns ===
Career
Rank	Player	TDs	Years
1	Logan Thomas	77	2010 2011 2012 2013
2	Tyrod Taylor	67	2007 2008 2009 2010
3	Kyron Drones	64	2023 2024 2025
4	Bryan Randall	59	2001 2002 2003 2004
5	Maurice DeShazo	57	1991 1992 1993 1994
6	Lee Suggs	53	1999 2000 2001 2002
7	Will Furrer	44	1988 1989 1990 1991
8	Jerod Evans	41	2016
9	Bob Schweickert	39	1962 1963 1964
	Steve Casey	39	1978 1979 1980 1981

Single season
Rank	Player	TDs	Year
1	Jerod Evans	41	2016
2	Logan Thomas	30	2011
3	Tyrod Taylor	29	2010
4	Ryan Willis	28	2018
5	Lee Suggs	27	2000
	Logan Thomas	27	2012
7	Josh Jackson	26	2017
	Kyron Drones	26	2025
9	Maurice DeShazo	25	1993
10	Bryan Randall	24	2004

Single game
Rank	Player	TDs	Year	Opponent
1	Tommy Francisco	6	1966	VMI
	Bryan Randall	6	2002	Syracuse
3	Morgan Gardner	5	1916	Roanoke
	Michael Vick	5	1999	Rutgers
	Lee Suggs	5	2000	UCF
	Bryan Randall	5	2003	California (Insight Bowl)
	Logan Thomas	5	2011	Miami (FL)
	Logan Thomas	5	2011	Georgia Tech
	Jerod Evans	5	2016	Boston College
	Josh Jackson	5	2017	ECU
	Kyron Drones	5	2023	Pittsburgh
	Kyron Drones	5	2025	California

== Defense ==
=== Interceptions ===
Career
Rank	Player	Ints	Years
1	Gene Bunn	18	1976 1977 1978
2	Tyronne Drakeford	16	1990 1991 1992 1993
3	Victor Harris	15	2005 2006 2007 2008
4	Willie Pile	14	1999 2000 2001 2002
5	Ron Davidson	13	1966 1967 1968
	Lenny Smith	13	1968 1969 1970
7	Mike Widger	12	1967 1968 1969
	John Granby	12	1987 1988 1989 1991
	Jayron Hosley	12	2009 2010 2011
10	Mike Johnson	11	1980 1981 1982 1983
	Ashley Lee	11	1980 1981 1982 1983
	William Yarborough	11	1992 1993 1994 1995

Single season
Rank	Player	Ints	Year
1	Ron Davidson	9	1967
	Jayron Hosley	9	2010
3	Mike Widger	7	1968
	Billy Hardee	7	1975
	Gene Bunn	7	1976
	Ashley Lee	7	1984
	Tyronne Drakeford	7	1992
8	Lenny Smith	6	1968
	Gene Bunn	6	1977
	Willie Pile	6	2000
	Victor Harris	6	2008
	Stephan Virgil	6	2008
	Rashad Carmichael	6	2009
	Kendall Fuller	6	2013

Single game
Rank	Player	Ints	Year	Opponent
1	Lenny Smith	3	1968	Wake Forest
	Paul Davis	3	1979	Florida State
	John Bell	3	1973	Florida State
	John Bell	3	1973	West Virginia
	Ron Davidson	3	1967	Florida State
	Derek Carter	3	1982	VMI
	Lorenzo Ferguson	3	1998	Clemson
	Keion Carpenter	3	1998	Pittsburgh
	Ike Charlton	3	1998	West Virginia
	Anthony Midget	3	1999	Miami (FL)
	Willie Pile	3	2000	Syracuse
	Garnell Wilds	3	2002	Syracuse
	Jayron Hosley	3	2010	NC State
	Kendall Fuller	3	2013	Duke

=== Tackles ===
Note: The Virginia Tech Record Book does not include a full top 10 in tackles stats, instead listing only a leader.

Career
Rank	Player	Tackles	Years
1	Rick Razzano	634	1974 1975 1976 1977

Single season
Rank	Player	Tackles	Year
1	Rick Razzano	177	1975
	Scott Hill	177	1987
3	Rick Razzano	165	1974
4	Rick Razzano	152	1977
5	Mike Johnson	148	1982
6	Ashley Lee	146	1981
7	Rick Razzano	140	1976
8	George DelRicco	137	1995
9	Mike Johnson	135	1983
10	Randy Cockrell	133	1987

Single game
Rank	Player	Tackles	Year	Opponent
1	Jerry Sheehan	31	1977	William & Mary
2	Rick Razzano	30	1977	Kentucky

=== Sacks ===
Note: The Virginia Tech Record Book does not include a full top 10 in sacks stats, instead listing only a leader.

Career
Rank	Player	Sacks	Years
1	Bruce Smith	46.0	1981 1982 1983 1984
2	Cornell Brown	36.0	1993 1994 1995 1996
3	Corey Moore	35.0	1996 1997 1998 1999

Single season
Rank	Player	Sacks	Year
1	Bruce Smith	22.0	1983
2	Corey Moore	17.0	1999
3	Bruce Smith	16.0	1984
	Antwaun Powell-Ryland	16.0	2024
5	Corey Moore	14.5	1998
6	Cornell Brown	14.0	1995

Single game
Rank	Player	Sacks	Year	Opponent
1	Bruce Smith	4.0	1983	Duke
	Bruce Smith	4.0	1984	William & Mary
	Morgan Roane	4.0	1985	William & Mary
	J.C. Price	4.0	1995	Miami (FL)
	Antwaun Powell-Ryland	4.0	2023	Wake Forest
	Antwaun Powell-Ryland	4.0	2024	Old Dominion
	Antwaun Powell-Ryland	4.0	2024	Boston College

== Kicking ==
=== Field goals made ===
Career
Rank	Player	FGs	Years
1	Joey Slye	78	2014 2015 2016 2017
2	Shayne Graham	69	1996 1997 1998 1999
3	Brandon Pace	58	2003 2004 2005 2006
4	Brian Johnson	54	2017 2018 2019 2020
	John Love	54	2022 2023 2024 2025
6	Chris Kinzer	47	1985 1986 1987 1988
7	Cody Journell	44	2010 2011 2012 2013
8	Don Wade	42	1981 1982 1983 1984
9	Ryan Williams	39	1991 1992 1993 1994
	Carter Warley	39	2000 2001 2002 2003

Single season
Rank	Player	FGs	Year
1	Dustin Keys	23	2008
	Joey Slye	23	2015
3	Chris Kinzer	22	1986
	Shayne Graham	22	1998
	John Love	22	2023
6	Mickey Thomas	21	1989
	Brandon Pace	21	2004
	Jud Dunlevy	21	2007
	Chris Hazley	21	2010
10	Matt Waldron	20	2009
	Cody Journell	20	2012
	Joey Slye	20	2014
	Joey Slye	20	2016
	Brian Johnson	20	2020

Single game
Rank	Player	FGs	Year	Opponent
1	Mickey Thomas	6	1989	Vanderbilt
	Joey Slye	6	2016	Pittsburgh
3	Don Wade	5	1981	Kentucky
	Chris Kinzer	5	1986	Vanderbilt
	John Love	5	2023	Syracuse

=== Field goal percentage ===
Career
Rank	Player	FG%	Years
1	Chris Hazley	95.5%	2008 2009 2010
2	Matt Waldron	87.0%	2007 2008 2009
3	Brandon Pace	85.3%	2003 2004 2005 2006
4	John Love	84.4%	2022 2023 2024 2025
5	John Parker Romo	81.8%	2019 2020 2021
6	Jud Dunlevy	80.8%	2004 2005 2006
7	Dustin Keys	79.3%	2007 2008
8	Brian Johnson	76.1%	2017 2018 2019 2020
9	Cody Journell	75.9%	2010 2011 2012 2013
10	Mickey Thomas	75.6%	1989 1990 1991

Single season
Rank	Player	FG%	Year
1	Chris Hazley	95.5%	2010
2	Brandon Pace	94.7%	2006
3	John Love	91.7%	2023
4	John Love	91.7%	2024
5	Matt Waldron	87.0%	2009
6	Brandon Pace	86.4%	2005
7	Mickey Thomas	84.0%	1989
8	Shayne Graham	82.6%	1997
	Brian Johnson	82.6%	2019
10	Cody Journell	82.4%	2011
