= 2008 Orange Bowl =

Postseason college football bowl game

2008 FedEx Orange Bowl
- BCS Bowl Game; 74th Orange Bowl
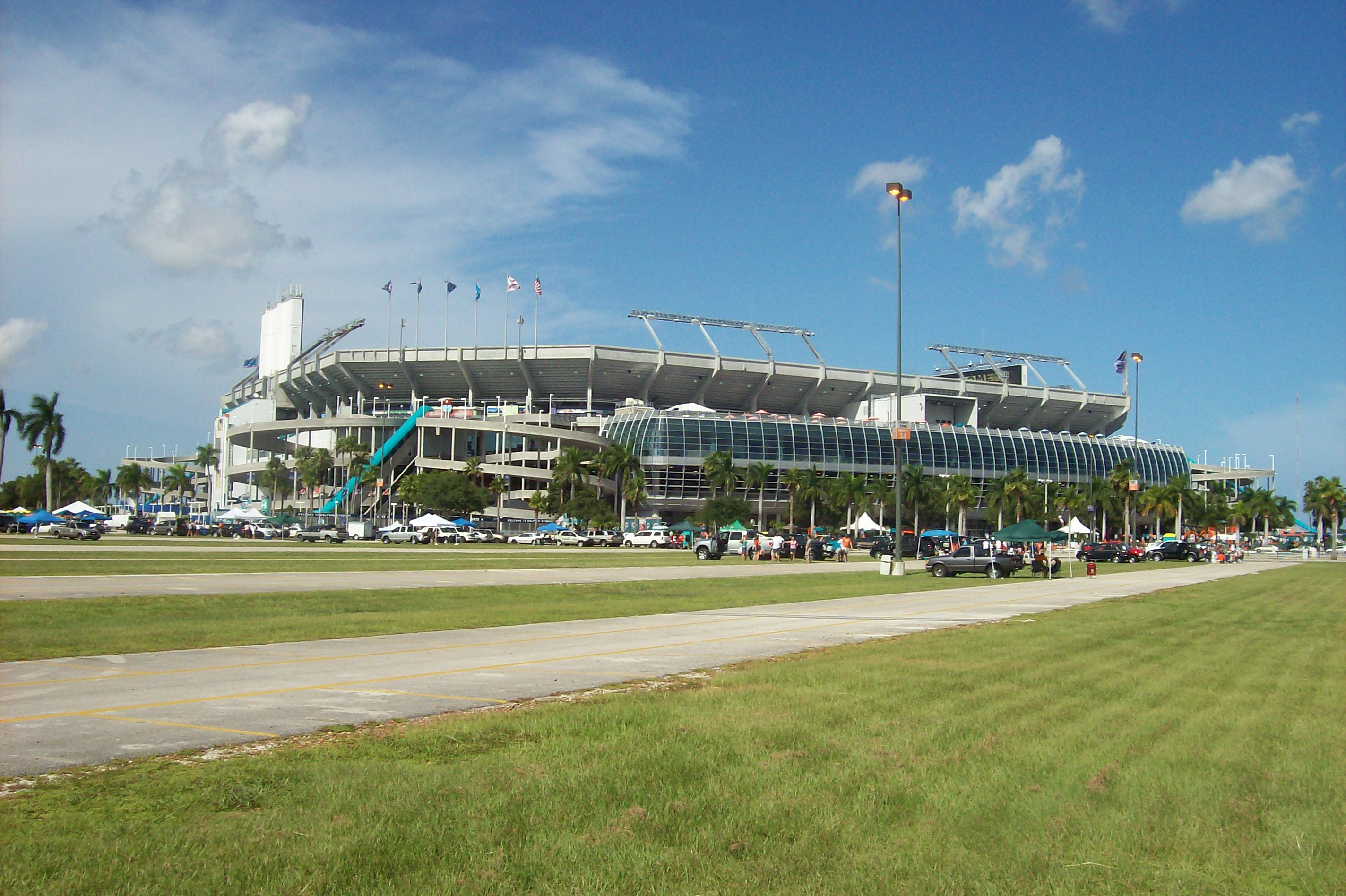
- Dolphin Stadium in Miami Gardens, Florida, hosted the Orange Bowl.
Kansas Jayhawks	Virginia Tech Hokies
(11–1)	(11–2)
Big 12	ACC
24	21
Head coach: Mark Mangino	Head coach: Frank Beamer
AP / Coaches / BCS; 8 / 8 / 8	AP / Coaches / BCS; 5 / 5 / 3
	1	2	3	4	Total
Kansas	7	10	0	7	24
Virginia Tech	0	7	7	7	21
- Date: January 3, 2008
- Season: 2007
- Stadium: Dolphin Stadium
- Location: Miami Gardens, Florida
- MVP: Aqib Talib, Kansas
- Favorite: Virginia Tech by 3 (50.5)
- National anthem: Katharine McPhee
- Referee: Bill LeMonnier (Big Ten)
- Halftime show: ZZ Top, DJ Irie and various high school marching bands
- Attendance: 74,111
- Payout: US$17 million per team

United States TV coverage
- Network: Fox
- Announcers: Kenny Albert, Darryl Johnston, Barry Alvarez, and Jeanne Zelasko

The 2008 FedEx Orange Bowl was a post-season college football bowl game between the Virginia Tech Hokies and the Kansas Jayhawks on January 3, 2008, at Dolphin Stadium in Miami Gardens, Florida. Spread bettors favored Virginia Tech by three points, but in a game dominated by defensive and special teams play, Kansas defeated Virginia Tech 24–21. The game was part of the 2007–08 Bowl Championship Series (BCS) of the 2007 NCAA Division I FBS football season and was the concluding game of the season for both teams. This 74th edition of the Orange Bowl was televised in the United States on Fox and was watched by more than eight million viewers.

The game between the fifth-ranked ACC champion Virginia Tech Hokies and the eighth-ranked Kansas Jayhawks from the Big 12 Conference (Big 12) was played at neutral-site Dolphins Stadium. Tech served as the home team in the contest. Virginia Tech automatically qualified for the Orange Bowl by virtue of the ACC's tie-in with the bowl, while the Orange Bowl selected Kansas over West Virginia, which had been upset by then 4–7 Pittsburgh, and conference rival Missouri. Two weeks after Kansas's selection, controversy erupted when a deal was revealed to put 4th-ranked Oklahoma against Virginia Tech. The deal was vetoed by BCS commissioners, and the selection of Kansas was upheld.

The game marked the first time the Jayhawks had been to the Orange Bowl since the 1969 Orange Bowl and was their first bowl game since the 2005 Fort Worth Bowl, when they defeated Houston 41–13. Virginia Tech last played in the Orange Bowl game in December 1996, losing to Nebraska 21–41. The 2008 Orange Bowl was Virginia Tech's 15th consecutive season with a bowl game, a streak dating to the 1993 Independence Bowl.

Kansas quarterback Todd Reesing completed 20 of his 37 passes for 227 yards, one touchdown, and one interception. On the opposite side of the ball, Virginia Tech quarterback Sean Glennon finished the game 13 for 28 passing, earning 160 yards and one touchdown, with two interceptions. Kansas cornerback Aqib Talib, whose 60-yard interception return for a touchdown gave Kansas its first lead of the game, won the game's Most Valuable Player award. After the game, Talib was one of several players from both teams to announce an intention to enter the 2008 NFL draft.

== Team selection ==
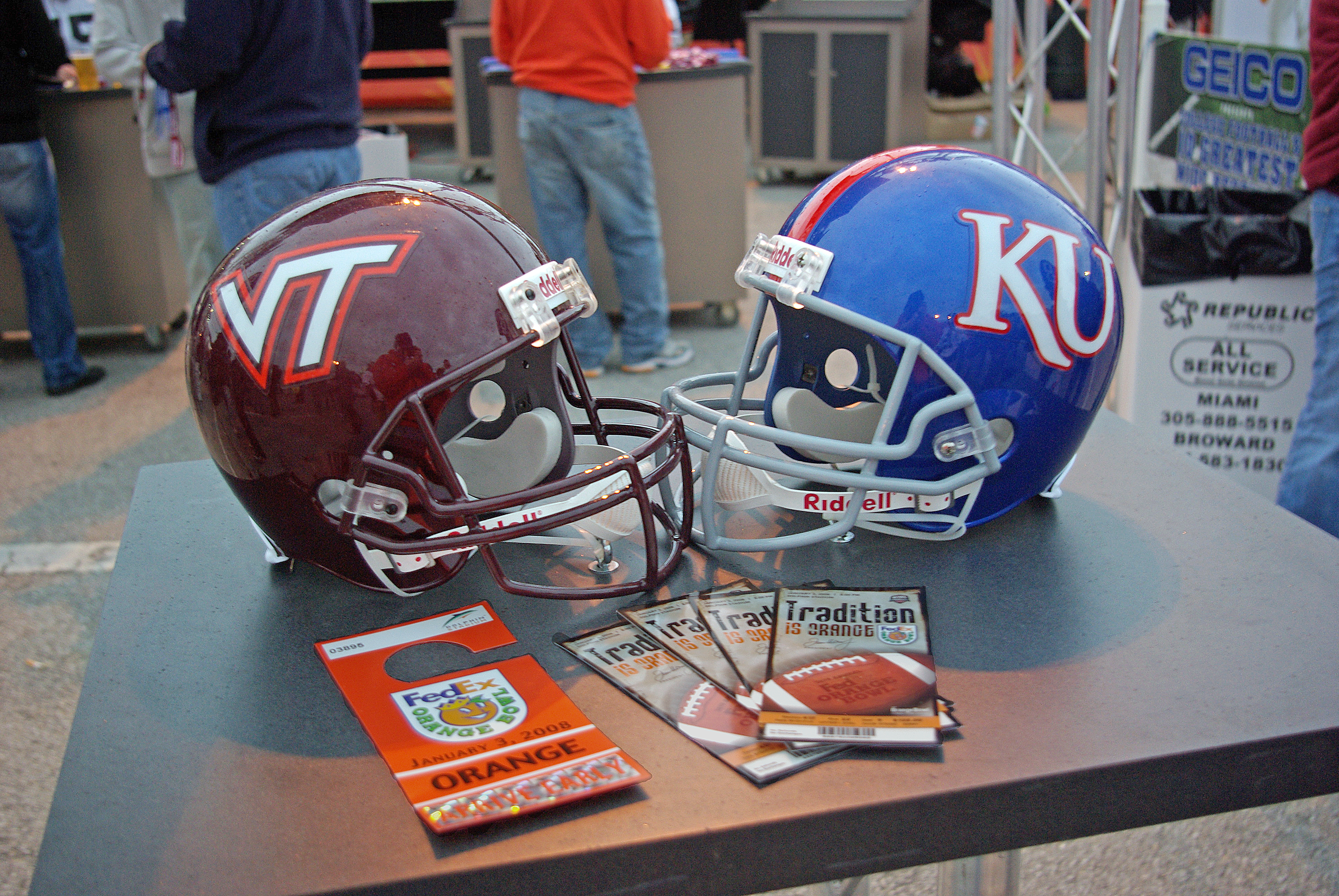
Bowl Championship Series commissioners and the Orange Bowl Committee selected Kansas and Virginia Tech to play in the 2008 Orange Bowl.

As champions of the Atlantic Coast Conference, Virginia Tech was awarded an automatic bid to the Orange Bowl game. The automatic ACC bid was the result of an off-season deal following the inaugural ACC Championship Game which granted the winner of the ACC Championship Game an automatic bid to the Orange Bowl unless it was ranked high enough in the Bowl Championship Series standings to play in the National Championship Game.

=== Virginia Tech ===
Virginia Tech's 2007 football season began five months after the Virginia Tech massacre, and football served as a way to help the university community emotionally heal. The opening game of the season, on September 1, 2007, was against East Carolina and featured numerous remembrance ceremonies and commemorations before the Hokies earned a 17–7 victory. One week later, Virginia Tech traveled to Baton Rouge, Louisiana to face the No. 2 LSU Tigers, widely regarded in pre-season polls as favorites to play in the National Championship Game. The Tigers overwhelmed the Hokies in front of a home crowd, 48–7.

In the wake of the Hokies' defeat, Virginia Tech chose to start a new quarterback and a new offensive plan. Behind freshman Tyrod Taylor, the Hokies earned five straight victories, including a win over No. 22 Clemson by 18 points. During the winning streak, Sean Glennon, who had started at quarterback for the Hokies during the first two games of the season, returned to alternate possessions with Taylor in an unusual two-quarterback system. On October 25, the Hokies faced No. 2 Boston College on a Thursday night in Blacksburg, Virginia. Boston College quarterback Matt Ryan managed a late-game comeback to win the game 14–10 with 11 seconds remaining.

With four consecutive victories after the loss, including a win over then-No. 16 Virginia, the Hokies won the Coastal division and secured a bid to the 2007 ACC Championship Game in Jacksonville, Florida. There, they faced a rematch with Boston College, champions of the Atlantic Division. As in the previous matchup, defense dominated, but unlike in the earlier matchup, Matt Ryan was unable to seize the victory. Two fourth-quarter interceptions by Virginia Tech sealed the Hokie win and an automatic bid to the Orange Bowl game.

=== Kansas ===
Kansas began its 2007 football season unregarded and without much consideration from the national media. In the opening Associated Press football poll of the 2007 season, Kansas did not receive a single vote. From their opening game of the year, however, the Jayhawks began to impress voters with their offensive efficiency. Against Mid-American Conference Champion Central Michigan, Kansas scored 52 points while allowing only a single touchdown.

Over the next three games, Kansas outscored its opponents 162–16. As Kansas's Big 12 schedule began, the Jayhawks continued to win. On October 6, Kansas traveled to Manhattan, Kansas, home of then-ranked No. 24 Kansas State for the opening game of its Big 12 schedule. In front of 50,924 spectators, Kansas quarterback Todd Reesing struggled for the first time in the season. Late in the fourth quarter, Reesing threw a ball that bounced off the facemask of wide receiver Dexton Fields before being intercepted. The interception set up a Kansas State touchdown that put Kansas into a 24–21 deficit with seven and a half minutes remaining. Reesing and the Jayhawks struck back quickly, however, and scored a 30-yard touchdown to take the lead for good.

With the win, Kansas broke into the rankings of the top 25 college football teams in the country for the first time since 1996, entering the AP Poll at No. 20. Over the next six weeks, Kansas defeated Nebraska, Oklahoma State, and Texas A&M, and Kansas climbed the national rankings. By the 13th week of the season, the stage had been set for an epic game against Kansas's traditional rival, Missouri.

Due to prior agreement, the 2007 edition of the Border War was held in Kansas City, Missouri, at Arrowhead Stadium, home of the National Football League's Kansas City Chiefs. In front of over 80,000 fans, No. 4 Missouri defeated No. 2 Kansas 36–28, giving the Jayhawks their first loss of the season. Missouri, with the win, earned a trip to the Big 12 Championship Game. In that game, Oklahoma defeated Missouri 38–17 to earn an automatic bid to the 2008 Fiesta Bowl. Because the loss was Missouri's second of the year, Kansas (which had only one loss) was selected as an at-large pick by the BCS and earned a trip to the Orange Bowl.

=== Controversy ===
Although Virginia Tech's selection via automatic bid was relatively quiet, Kansas' selection caused a great deal of controversy. Kansas had lost to Big 12 runner-up Missouri and had a lower Bowl Championship Poll ranking than the Tigers. Some believed Missouri should have been selected ahead of Kansas because they had defeated Kansas and because they had played in the Big 12 Championship Game. According to BCS officials, however, Missouri's two losses were more of a detriment than Kansas's one loss and subsequent championship game absence.

Pundits and fans who opposed Kansas' selection pointed to the Jayhawks' strength of schedule, which at one point during the season was as low as 109th out of 119 Division I teams. By the time of the BCS selection, however, Kansas's strength of schedule had climbed by a small amount, reaching 88th in the Sagarin rankings and 74th in the CBS rankings. The final rankings rated Kansas' schedule as more difficult than Hawaii, which was also selected to play in the BCS. Aggravating the situation was that Kansas and Missouri had one of the most intense rivalries in college football. Known as the Border War, the roots of the rivalry dated to the years before the American Civil War.

Two weeks after the selection of Kansas, yet another controversy arose when it was revealed that Big 12 and ACC officials had worked out an agreement to feature an Oklahoma/Virginia Tech matchup in the Orange Bowl in the hours leading up to the final selection. Oklahoma, who initiated the proposal, requested that it face the highest-ranked BCS opponent then available, which would have been Virginia Tech (ranked 3rd in the BCS). Normally, Oklahoma, the 2007 Big 12 Champion, would have played in the Fiesta Bowl, which holds the automatic rights to the Big 12 Champion's BCS bid. A little-known clause in the Bowl Championship Series contract, however, allows for the commissioners of the BCS to override that bid if the automatically selected team had played in the game the previous year, or to create a more interesting matchup. Oklahoma had played in the 2007 Fiesta Bowl and seemed a perfect candidate for execution of the clause. Representatives from the Orange and Fiesta bowls reportedly worked out a deal to swap Oklahoma and Kansas and Dan Beebe, the commissioner from the Big 12, presented the plan to the BCS committee. The remaining BCS commissioners rejected the request (with only the Big 12, ACC and Big East commissioners in favor) and honored the original selection of Kansas for the Orange Bowl and forced Oklahoma to accept its automatic Fiesta Bowl Bid. The release of this plan upset many fans at both schools and across the country, who perceived that an (4) Oklahoma – (3) Virginia Tech matchup would have been superior to a (8) Kansas – (3) Virginia Tech game. Ironically, while Oklahoma-Virginia Tech was perceived as a better match-up due to their high rankings, both teams went on to be upset by the lower ranked team with Oklahoma losing 48–28 to (9)West Virginia.

== Pregame buildup ==
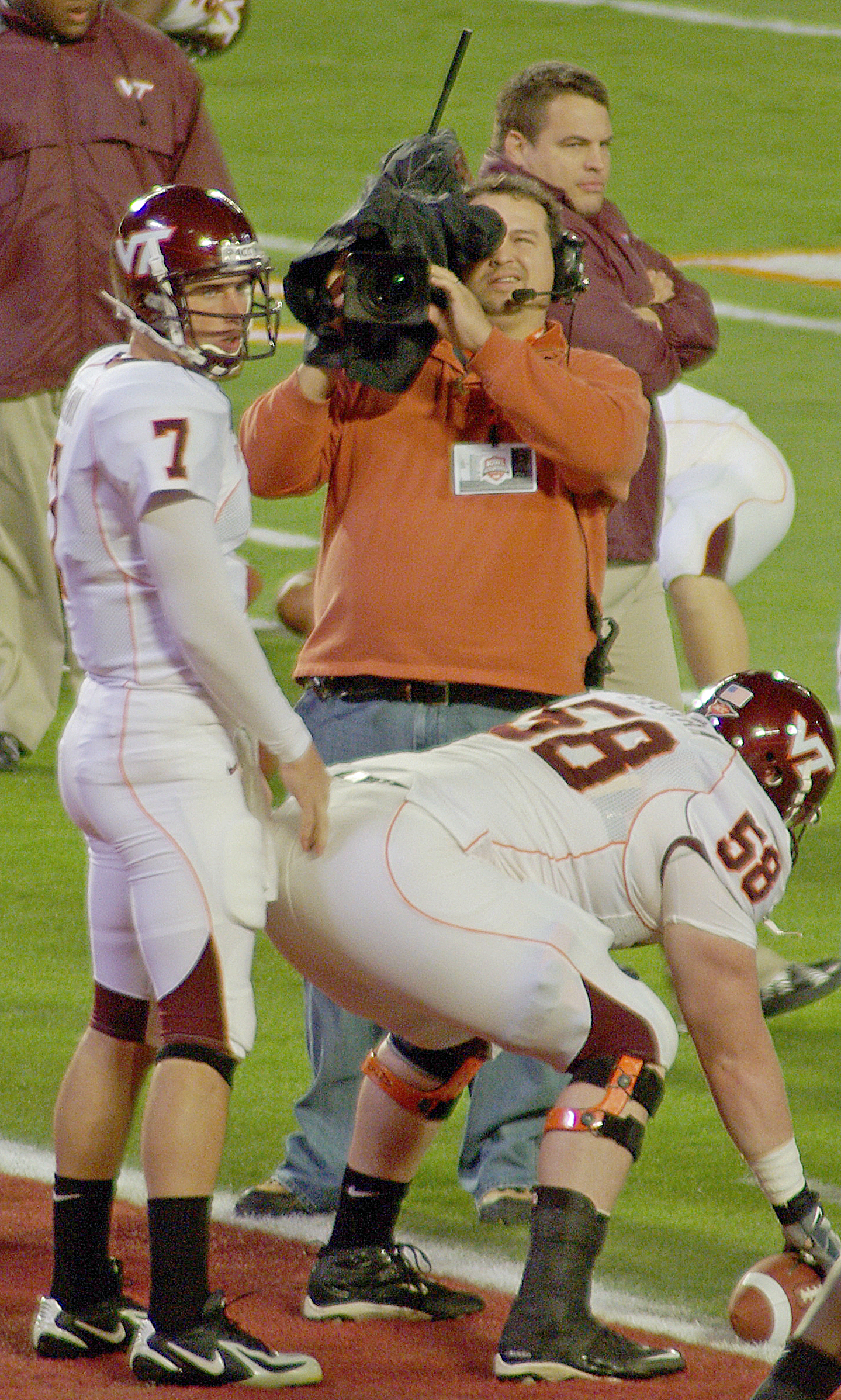
Media coverage of the 2008 Orange Bowl was extensive.

Most pre-game media and popular coverage of the 2008 Orange Bowl focused on the matchup between Kansas's No. 2 scoring offense and Virginia Tech's No. 2 scoring defense. Outside factors, such as coaching, previous experience, and fan support were also considered in pre-game analysis of the matchup. Outside story lines included Virginia Tech's recovery from the Virginia Tech Massacre and recovery from late-season losses suffered by each team (against Missouri for Kansas and against Boston College for Virginia Tech).

=== Offensive matchups ===
==== Kansas ====
Heading into the Orange Bowl, Kansas was ranked second in the nation in scoring (44.3) and sixth in yards per game (491). Kansas scored 40 or more points eight times during the 2007 season and scored 50 points five times. Kansas's ground game was led by running back Brandon McAnderson, who averaged 87.5 yards per game during the 2007 season and earned 1,050 yards and 16 touchdowns in the season leading to the Orange Bowl. Through the air, Kansas quarterback Todd Reesing earned the 11th-highest passer rating in the country, averaging a 152.41 quarterback rating in 2007. Reesing completed 62.6% of his passes during the 2007 season, earning 3,259 yards, 32 touchdowns, and just six interceptions. Reesing's favorite receiver was Marcus Henry, who was ranked No. 29 in the country for passing yardage, averaging over 82 receiving yards per game. During 2007, Henry earned 994 yards and nine touchdowns. On the offensive line, the Jayhawks were led by All-American left tackle Anthony Collins, who finished as a finalist for the Outland Trophy, awarded to college football's best offensive lineman. Because of the Jayhawks' effectiveness on offense, they punted the ball just 46 times during the 2007 season, the seventh-lowest total in Division I.

==== Virginia Tech ====
Virginia Tech featured an unusual two-quarterback system on offense, as quarterbacks Sean Glennon and Tyrod Taylor shared time behind center. Though unusual, the system was successful in leading the Hokies to their second ACC Championship in four years. During the 2007 regular season, Glennon threw for 1,636 yards and 11 touchdowns, completing 63 percent of his passes. Taylor, meanwhile, passed for 916 yards and five touchdowns while also rushing for 431 yards. Some pundits predicted Kansas might have difficulty with Taylor's mobility, as his style of play was similar to that of Missouri's Chase Daniel, who gave Kansas its sole loss of the 2007 season. On the other end of the Virginia Tech aerial offense was a corps of capable receivers, led by senior wide receivers Eddie Royal and Josh Morgan. Morgan was the fifth-ranked receiver in Virginia Tech history, having earned 1,787 receiving yards. Royal was sixth, having earned 1,767 yards. Two of Tech's other receivers, Josh Hyman and Justin Harper, recorded 1,138 and 1,274 receiving yards each, marking the first time in Virginia Tech history that the Hokies had four different thousand-yard career receivers on the same team. On the ground, the Hokies were led by running back Branden Ore, who rushed for 876 yards and eight touchdowns during the regular season. One week before the Orange Bowl, Tech coaches revealed that Ore would be suspended for the first quarter of the game against Kansas as punishment for showing up late to the Hokies' final pre-bowl practice. Ore was replaced by sophomore rusher Kenny Lewis Jr.

=== Defensive matchups ===
==== Virginia Tech ====
Virginia Tech finished the season ranked second nationally in points allowed per game (15.5) and fourth nationally in yardage allowed (293). The Hokies didn't allow a fourth-quarter point in the five games after giving up 14 fourth-quarter points to Boston College in Blacksburg. One key player in the Virginia Tech defense was linebacker Xavier Adibi, who had scored his third career defensive touchdown in the ACC Championship Game against Boston College. Adibi, together with fellow linebacker Vince Hall, made up "the best LB duo in the country," according to ESPN commentator Chris Spielman. Hall's effectiveness had, however, been limited in the 2007 season by a broken wrist suffered against Clemson. Hall missed four games with the injury, but returned to play the final three contests of the season for Virginia Tech and promised to be featured heavily in the 2008 Orange Bowl. Backing up the Virginia Tech linebackers was a strong backfield, which had produced 12 NFL draft picks in the nine years preceding the 2007 season. Primary among the backfield players were cornerbacks Victor Harris and Brandon Flowers, who Sports Illustrated.com called "maybe the best cornerback duo in the country".

==== Kansas ====
Kansas, meanwhile, was less-highly regarded on defense and came into the 2008 Orange Bowl ranked 57th nationally in pass defense. On the ground, however, Kansas was ranked far higher, sixth in the nation. In addition, Kansas allowed an average of only 16 points per game, good enough for to be ranked fourth nationally. A key portion of that run defense was defensive tackle James McClinton, who was named the Big 12's Defensive Lineman of the Year and earned second-team All-America honors. McClinton finished the 2007 regular season with 10.5 tackles for loss and promised more of the same for the Orange Bowl. The team captain of the Jayhawk defense, meanwhile, was All-American cornerback Aqib Talib. Talib was also a threat on offense, catching eight passes, including four touchdowns, during the regular season.

== Game summary ==
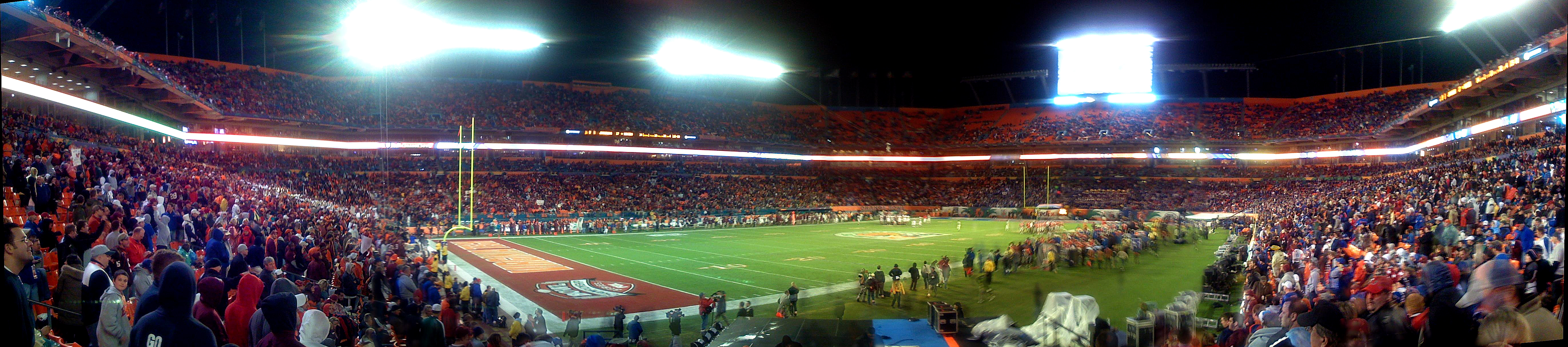
A panoramic view of the 2008 Orange Bowl shows the stands of Dolphin Stadium packed with Kansas and Virginia Tech fans on the night of January 3, 2008.

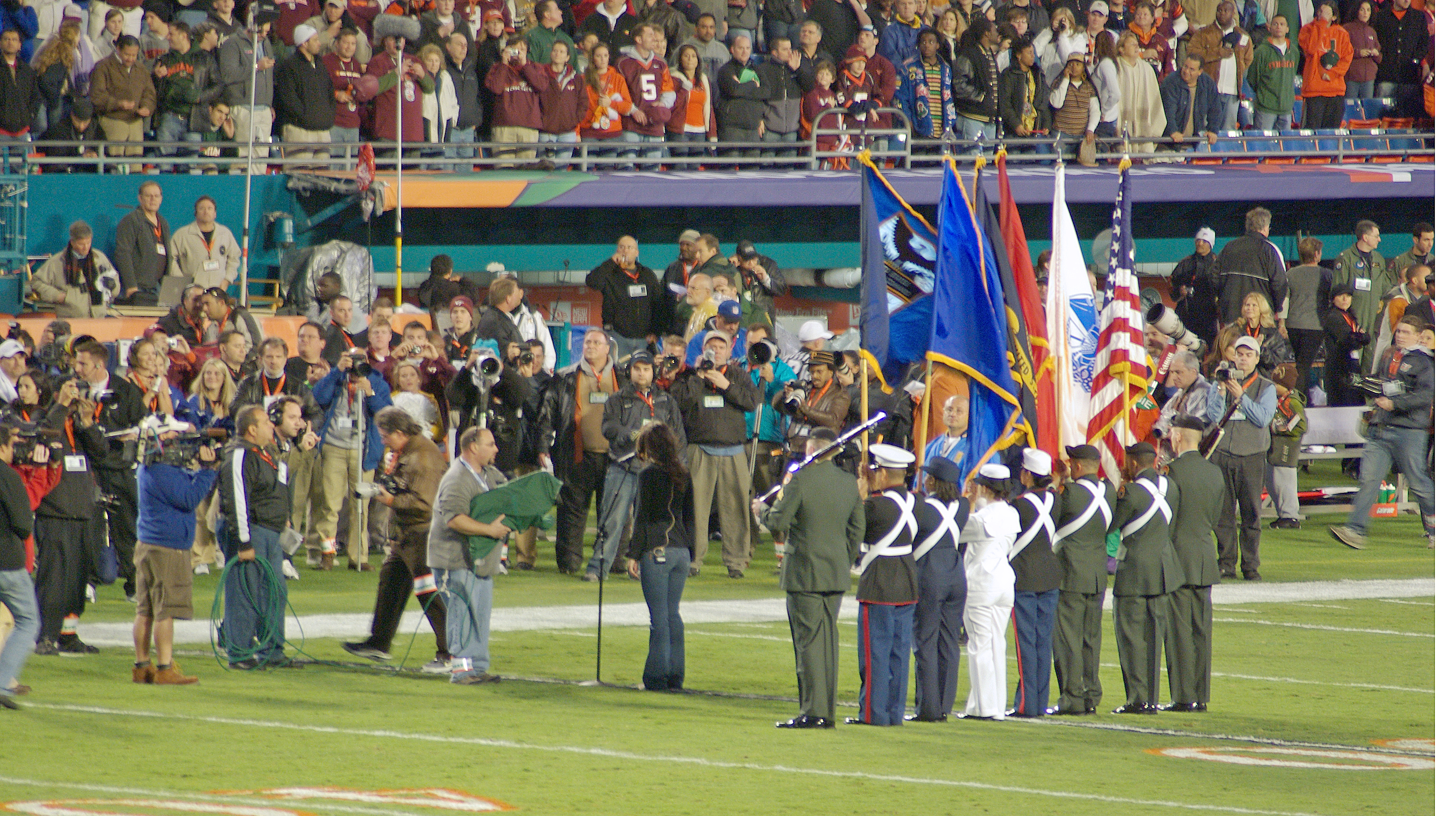
Katharine McPhee sings the national anthem at the 2008 Orange Bowl.

The 2008 Orange Bowl kicked off at 8:30 p.m. EST at Dolphin Stadium in Miami Gardens, Florida. The official attendance for the game was listed as 74,111 (the eighth consecutive Orange Bowl sellout), but actual attendance appeared to be lower, and several upper-deck sections of the stadium were sparsely filled. Approximately 15 million viewers watched the game, earning the broadcast a Nielsen rating of 7.4. The broadcast of the 2008 Orange Bowl was the only BCS bowl game to show a rise in television viewers over the previous season's broadcast, as the 2007 Orange Bowl had only earned a Nielsen rating of 7.0. The national anthem was sung by American Idol runner-up Katharine McPhee.

The coin toss featured former star players for both schools, Bruce Smith for Virginia Tech and Gale Sayers for Kansas. Kansas won the toss and elected to defer its choice until the second half. Virginia Tech chose to receive the ball to start the game. Kansas would receive the ball to begin the second half. At kickoff, the air temperature was unseasonably cold for Miami at 57 °F (14 °C), and the skies were cloudy with intermittent rain.

=== First quarter ===
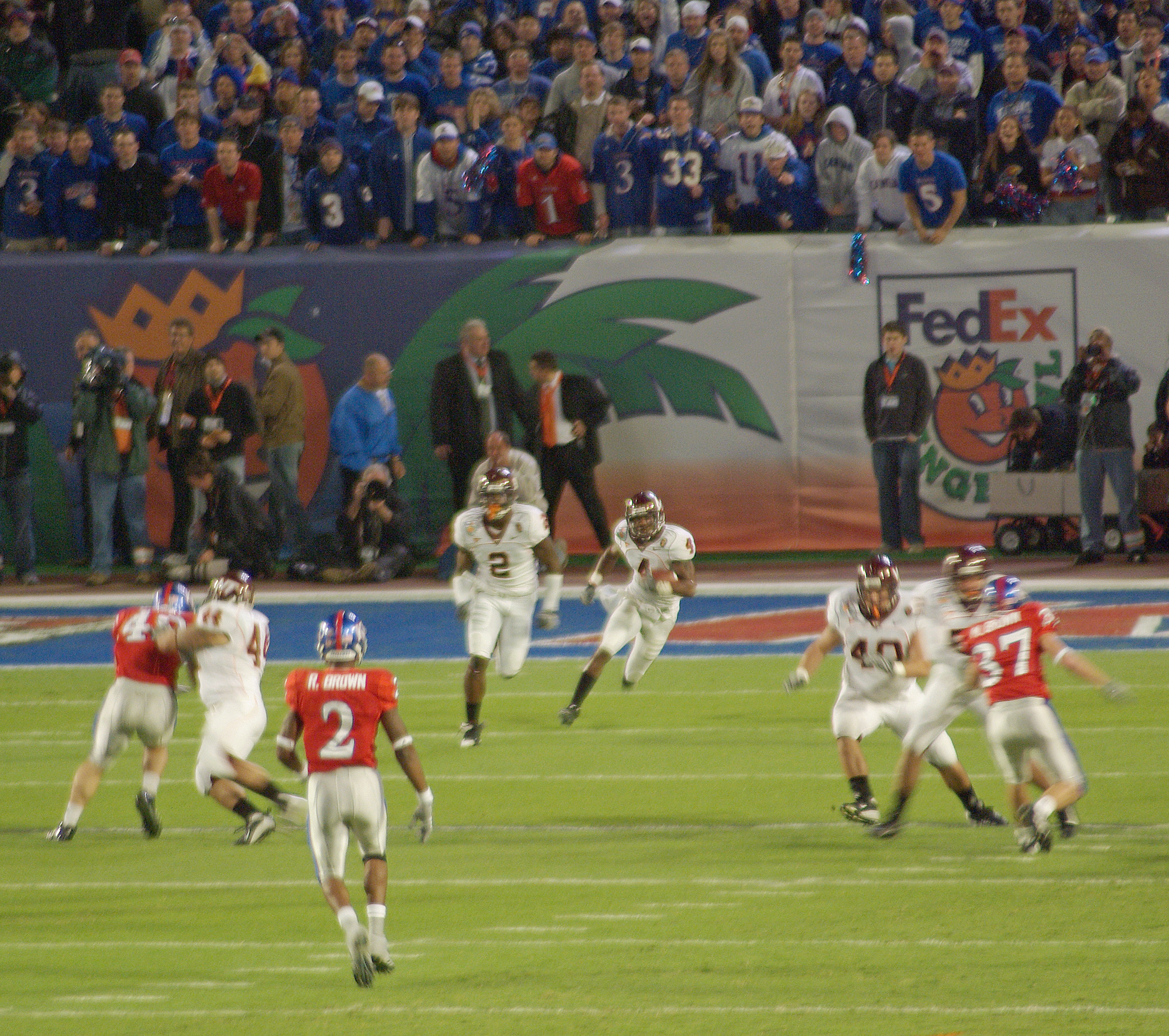
Virginia Tech's Eddie Royal fields and returns the opening kickoff of the game.

Virginia Tech's Eddie Royal fielded the opening kickoff from Kansas kicker Scott Webb, returning it 59 yards to the 41-yard line of Kansas. The return gave the Virginia Tech offense excellent field position to begin the game. Tech quarterback Sean Glennon connected on an 11-yard pass to Justin Harper for a first down on the opening play of the game, but Kansas' defense stiffened on subsequent plays. After Virginia Tech's Tyrod Taylor entered the game at quarterback, Kansas sacked Taylor twice, pushing Virginia Tech 19 yards backward, out of field goal range. Because of the sacks, Virginia Tech was forced to punt the ball away without scoring any points.

The punt was downed in the end zone for a touchback, and Kansas began its first offensive possession of the game at its 20-yard line. Kansas quarterback Todd Reesing proved remarkably effective, completing six of his eight passes during the drive and rushing for five yards on a quarterback scramble. Reesing drove Kansas' offense into Virginia Tech territory, but after Tech's Orion Martin sacked Reesing, Kansas was unable to gain another first down and kicker Scott Webb was sent into the game to attempt a 44-yard field goal. Webb's kick sailed wide of the uprights, however, and the game remained scoreless with 6:44 remaining in the first quarter.

After the missed field goal, Virginia Tech took over on offense at its own 27-yard line. Running back Kenny Lewis, Jr., replacing the suspended Branden Ore, ran for a first down, and Tyrod Taylor connected on an 11-yard pass to Eddie Royal for another first down. Now inside Kansas territory, Taylor attempted another pass. Kansas All-American cornerback Aqib Talib jumped between Taylor's throw and the receiver, intercepting the ball. Talib returned the interception 60 yards to the end zone for a Kansas touchdown, the first points of the game. An extra point kick by Scott Webb made the score 7–0 Kansas with 5:15 remaining in the quarter.

High-stepping into the endzone, Aqib Talib committed a 15-yard unsportsmanlike conduct penalty, which was enforced on the post-score kickoff. The penalty, coupled with a good kick return by Virginia Tech, gave the Hokies excellent field position for their third possession of the game. Quarterback Sean Glennon capitalized on that field position, connecting on a 24-yard pass to wide receiver Justin Harper. The catch pushed Virginia Tech inside Kansas territory and seemingly set up the Hokie offense for their first score of the game. After two plays for no gain and a five-yard loss when Glennon was sacked by James Holt, Virginia Tech was forced to attempt a 49-yard field goal. Jud Dunlevy's kick fell short, however, and Virginia Tech was denied a score. Kansas recovered the short kick, which landed in the end zone, and returned the ball 39 yards. Despite the momentum earned by the missed kick, Kansas went three plays without gaining a first down and was forced to punt the ball away. Virginia Tech recovered the ball at its 15-yard line and ran two plays before time ran out in the first quarter.

At the end of the first quarter, Kansas had kept Virginia Tech scoreless while capitalizing on a 60-yard interception return by Aqib Talib for the game's only points, a 7–0 lead.

=== Second quarter ===
Virginia Tech began the second quarter in possession of the ball and facing a third-and-five from its own 20-yard line. On the first play of the quarter, quarterback Sean Glennon threw for the first down, but was intercepted at the 37-yard line by Kansas' Chris Harris. After the interception, Kansas had the ball at the Virginia Tech 31-yard line. Todd Reesing connected on a first-down pass to Derek Fine, and running back Brandon McAnderson contributed several short rushes. The Kansas offense failed to gain a second first down after the interception, however, and kicker Scott Webb was again called upon to attempt a field goal, this time from 32 yards away. Unlike his first kick, the second sailed through the uprights for three points. With 12 minutes remaining in the second quarter, Kansas extended its lead to 10–0.

Virginia Tech recovered the post-field goal kickoff at its own 31-yard line, and Branden Ore, having entered the game after his one-quarter suspension, advanced the ball three yards. Quarterback Tyrod Taylor also advanced the ball five yards on a scramble, but failed to gain a first down. The Hokies were forced to punt the ball away, and Kansas recovered the kick at its 41-yard line. With good field position and momentum granted by the interception and field goal, Kansas moved the ball quickly. Todd Reesing was sacked by Nekos Brown and Xavier Adibi, but connected to Jake Sharp for 20 yards on two passes, advancing the ball deep into Virginia Tech territory. Passes to Marcus Henry and Dezmon Briscoe advanced Kansas 21 more yards into Hokie territory, and Brandon McAnderson rushed for five yards on the ground. Capping the Kansas drive was a 13-yard toss by Reesing to Henry for a touchdown. The score, which came with 7:03 remaining in the first half, gave Kansas a 17–0 lead, its largest of the game.

Virginia Tech recovered the post-touchdown kickoff desperately needing to score before halftime. Kansas had played strongly on defense throughout the first half, and the game's momentum was firmly behind the Jayhawks, who had capitalized on two Virginia Tech turnovers. Sean Glennon completed a three-yard pass to Josh Morgan to begin the drive, but it was running back Branden Ore who did the vast majority of the work during the Hokies' final offensive drive of the first half. After Glennon's pass, Ore rushed the ball on six straight plays, picking up 33 yards and two first downs on the way. After that, Glennon contributed a five-yard run of his own, which was aided by a 15-yard facemask penalty against Kansas. Branden Ore received the ball again, rushing on five consecutive plays, culminating in a one-yard run for a touchdown. The score came with just 1:03 left in the half, giving Virginia Tech its first points of the game and narrowing Kansas' lead to 17–7.

Kansas received Virginia Tech's kickoff, and the Hokies attempted to give themselves another chance at offense by calling timeouts after Kansas rushed the ball. The timeouts stopped the clock, but Kansas managed to earn a first down and run out the clock after Tech used its allotted three timeouts. Heading into halftime, Kansas still had the lead and the momentum, but a Virginia Tech touchdown had cut the Jayhawks' lead to just 10 points, 17–7.

=== Halftime show ===
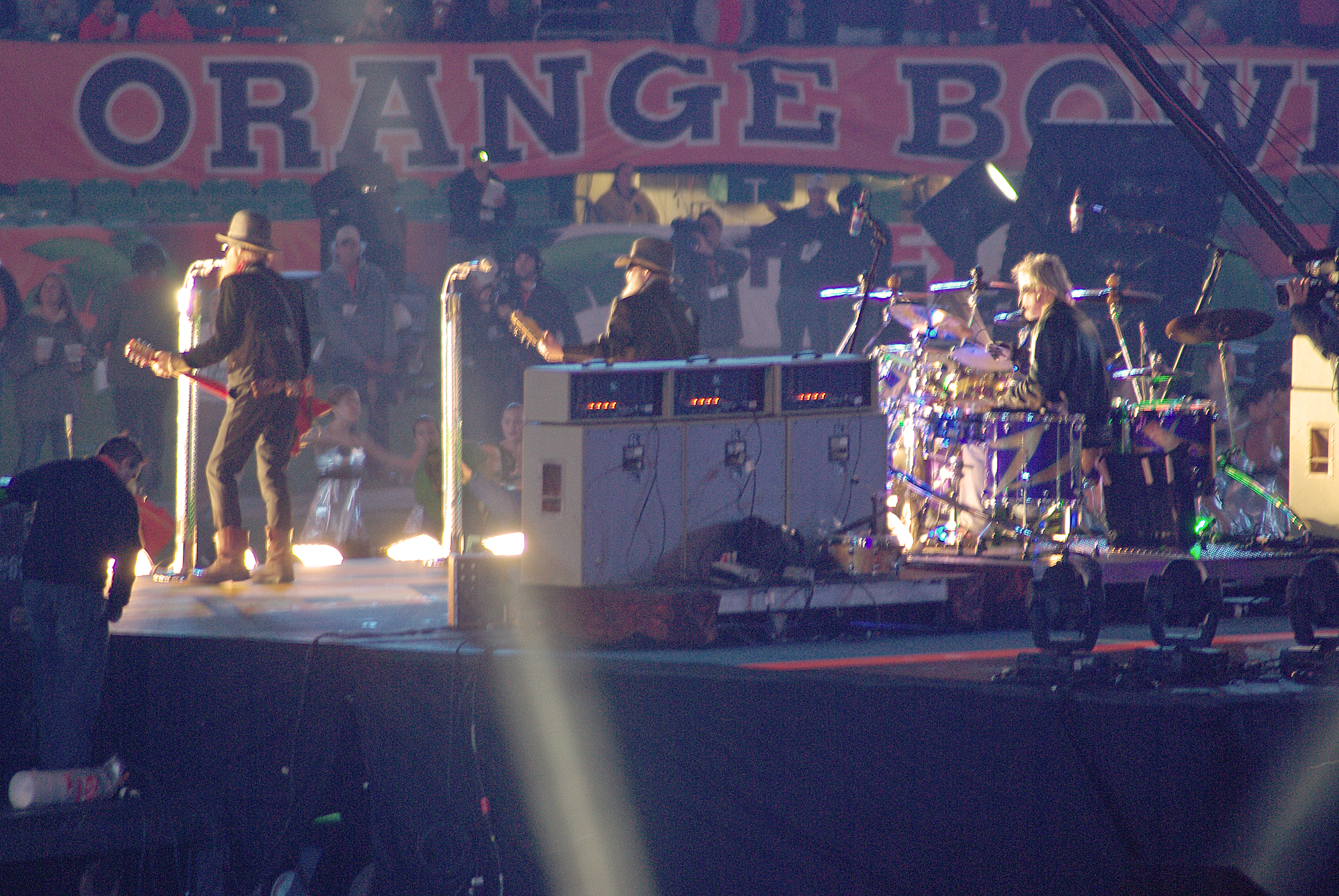
ZZ Top performs as part of the halftime show of the 2008 Orange Bowl.

The halftime show of the 2008 Orange Bowl was headlined by American blues rock band ZZ Top, who played their song Sharp Dressed Man. The band was a favorite of Kansas quarterback Todd Reesing, who expressed regrets prior to the game that he would not be able to listen to the performance. Also featured during the halftime show were a group of high school marching bands, who played Stevie Ray Vaughan's Crossfire while ZZ Top's stage was disassembled. The two teams’ bands were supposed to play at the halftime show, but they were in a parade. Following the halftime show, the Fox truck broadcasting the game experienced a power outage. As Fox crews worked to get the power restored, the second half was delayed by three minutes.

=== Third quarter ===
Kansas, which had won the pre-game coin toss, received the ball to open the second half. Todd Reesing initially began where he had left off in the first half, completing a pass to Dexton Fields for 12 yards and a first down. On subsequent plays, however, Virginia Tech showed some of the defensive prowess that had been promoted heavily heading into the game. Aqib Talib was tackled for a loss of six yards after catching a pass. Reesing was sacked under heavy pressure from the Tech defense. On third down, a Reesing pass was nearly intercepted by Cody Grimm, who knocked it down to force a Kansas punt. On the subsequent return, Virginia Tech earned its first big play of the game. Eddie Royal, who had returned every one of Virginia Tech's first-half kicks, received the ball and lateraled it to Justin Harper, who returned it 84 yards for a touchdown. The score cut Kansas' lead to just three points with 11:35 remaining in the third quarter.

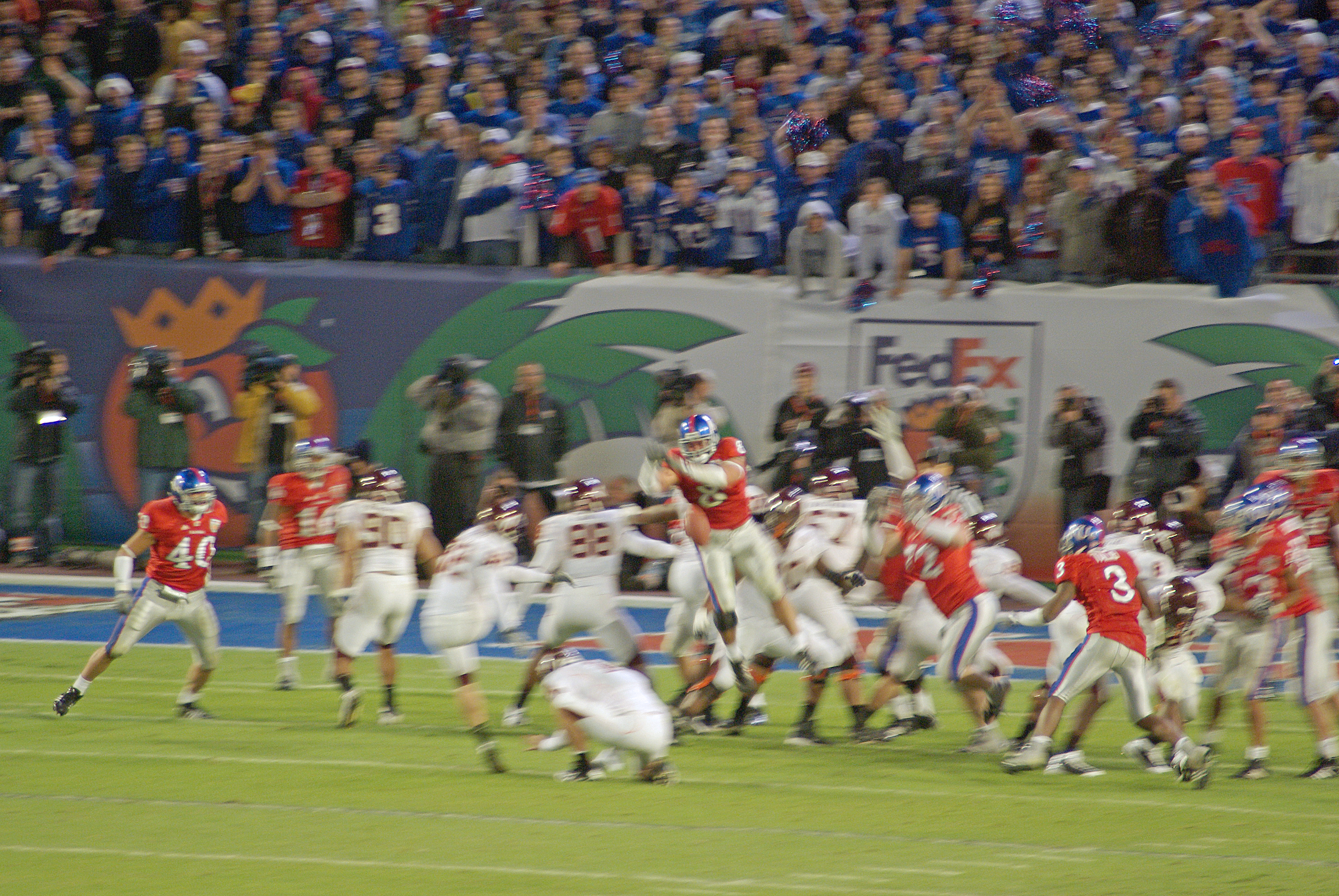
Kansas's Joe Mortensen breaks through the Virginia Tech line to block Jud Dunlevy's 25-yard field goal attempt in the third quarter.

With the game's momentum now firmly in their favor, the Virginia Tech defense stopped Kansas' offense on three straight plays, forcing another Kansas punt. The kick traveled 62 yards and was recovered at the Virginia Tech 18-yard line. Virginia Tech's offense, despite the poor field position, moved quickly, partly due to a 15-yard pass interference penalty against Kansas. Sean Glennon completed a controversial 37-yard pass to tight end Greg Boone to drive the Hokies deep into Kansas territory. Initially, the pass appeared to have been intercepted by a Kansas defender, but subsequent replays revealed Boone had wrested possession of the ball away from the defender. Three rushes deep inside the Kansas red zone netted the Hokies just nine more yards, setting up a fourth-and-one scenario for the Virginia Tech offense. Rather than risk a failed fourth-down conversion, Virginia Tech head coach Frank Beamer sent in kicker Jud Dunlevy to attempt a 25-yard field goal. During the kick, however, Kansas defender Joe Mortensen rushed through the Virginia Tech line and blocked the kick, denying the Hokies three points and preserving a 17–14 Kansas lead with 6:31 remaining in the quarter.

The block neutralized all the Virginia Tech momentum that had been gained with the punt-return touchdown and kept Kansas in the lead. After the block, however, Kansas failed to gain a first down on offense. Though forced to punt the ball away, punter Kyle Tucker's 42-yard kick was helped by a 10-yard illegal blocking penalty against Virginia Tech that pinned the Hokies at their own 25-yard line. Branden Ore picked up a first down with two rushes, but the Tech offense failed to gain another first down and the Hokies were forced to punt the ball again.

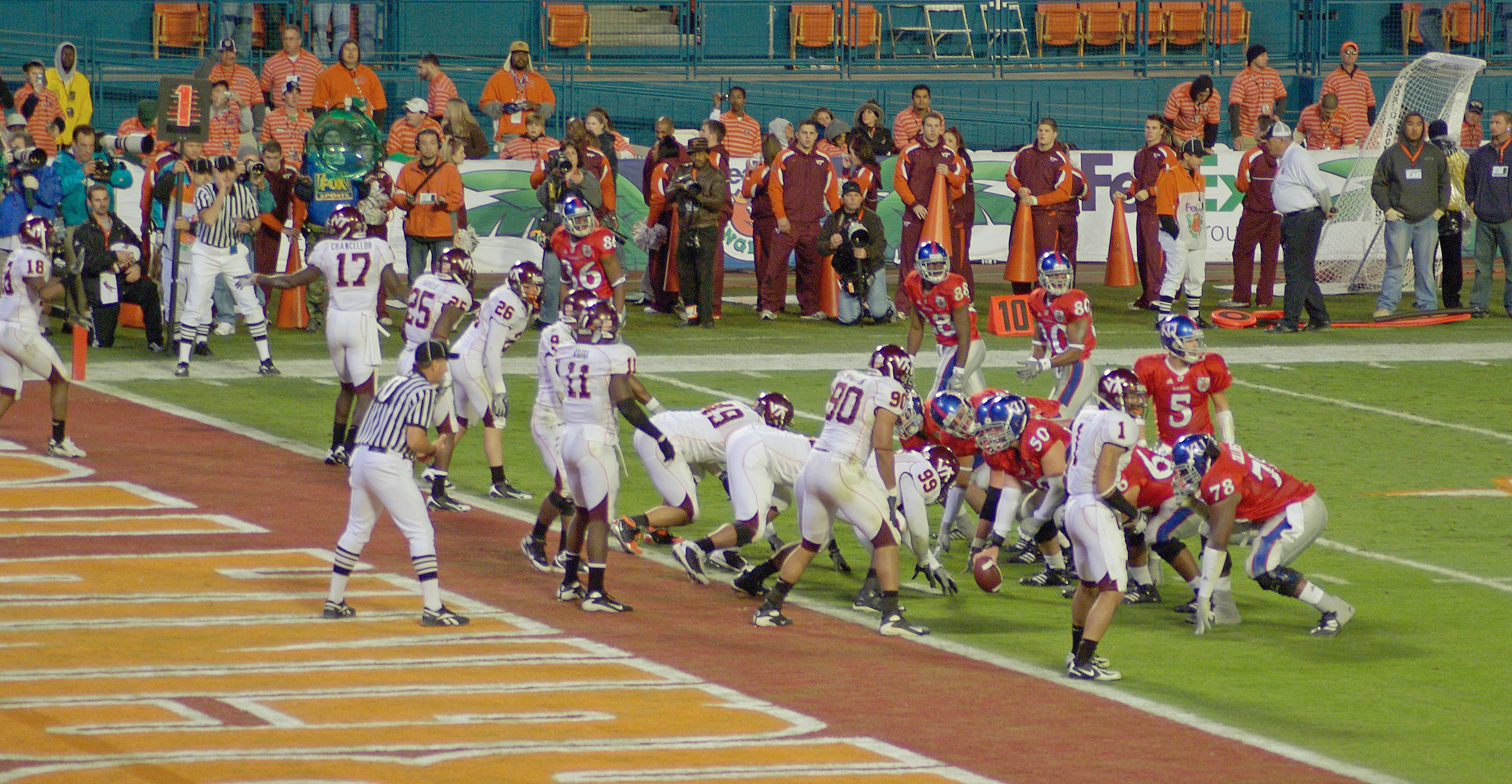
Kansas's offense lines up on the Virginia Tech one-yard line.

Kansas took over at its own 12-yard line after the punt. On the first play of the drive, Reesing completed a 37-yard pass to Dexton Fields, putting the ball near midfield. Three straight incomplete passes later, Kansas faced a fourth-and-ten and a punt. Instead of punting the ball away, however, Kansas elected to try a risky fake punt-pass. Instead of snapping the ball to the punter, the ball was snapped to running back Brandon McAnderson, who threw the ball 22 yards downfield to Micah Brown for a first down. On the very next play, Reesing, having returned to the field, connected on a 28-yard pass to Dexton Fields, who was pushed out of bounds just short of the goal line. With a first-and-goal from inside the one-yard line, a Kansas touchdown seemed inevitable. On the first play inside the red zone, however, Kansas fumbled the ball. Though the ball was recovered by a Kansas player, the play lost four yards. On the next play, Kansas committed a 15-yard personal foul penalty. The personal foul was followed by a 10-yard holding penalty, and Kansas was pushed entirely outside the Virginia Tech red zone. In an effort to push back, Reesing threw a pass deep downfield. Instead of being completed, however, the ball was intercepted by Virginia Tech's D.J. Parker. With 39 seconds left in the quarter, Virginia Tech had stopped Kansas from gaining a point despite the Jayhawks penetrating inside the Virginia Tech one-yard line.

As the quarter came to an end, the Hokies gained two quick first downs and advanced the ball 26 yards, seemingly having regained the momentum lost with the blocked kick. With one quarter remaining in the game, however, Kansas still had a three-point lead, 17–14.

=== Fourth quarter ===
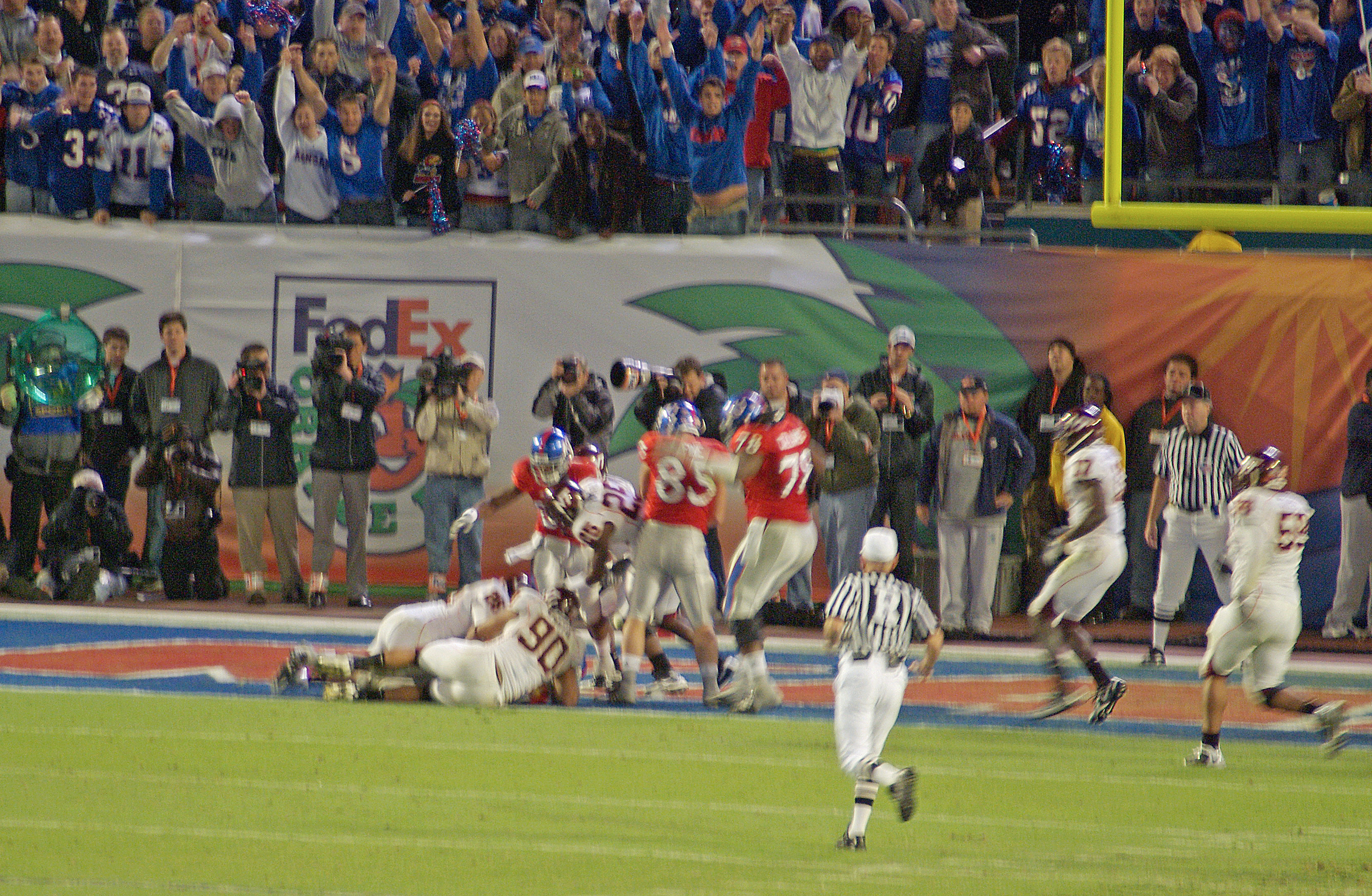
Kansas's rushing offense scores a touchdown on short yardage late in the fourth quarter against the Virginia Tech defense.

The first few plays of the fourth quarter failed to live up to the promise that had been shown in the third for the Hokies. Two incomplete passes and one that gained just two yards forced Virginia Tech to punt the ball away with 13:49 remaining in the quarter. After taking over at its 33-yard line, Kansas had no more success on offense than did Virginia Tech. After three straight plays with no gain, Kansas was forced to punt the ball away as well. A 58-yard kick by Kyle Tucker pinned Virginia Tech inside its 10-yard line, and the Hokies were unable to advance the ball much beyond the ten-yard line. An incomplete pass and a two-yard run by Branden Ore were all the offense managed before Sean Glennon threw a 20-yard interception to the Jayhawks' Justin Thornton. Thornton returned the ball 30 yards to the Virginia Tech two-yard line, and on Kansas' first play after the interception, Todd Reesing ran two yards for the touchdown. The score gave the Jayhawks a 24–14 lead with just 10:57 remaining.

After the Kansas kickoff, Virginia Tech took over at its 33-yard line. Needing a score, the Hokies committed a five-yard false start penalty before quarterback Sean Glennon was sacked by Kansas' Mike Rivera. The two plays pushed the Virginia Tech offense back, preventing them from gaining a first down. Forced to punt the ball away, Virginia Tech had to play defense as Kansas took over at its 28-yard line. Secure in their lead, Kansas elected to run the ball in an effort to keep the clock moving and bring the game to an end more quickly. Brandon McAnderson broke free for 28 yards on the first play of the drive, and Jake Sharp contributed another first down on the ground before the Hokie defense stopped Kansas on an attempt to earn a first down on a fourth-and-two deep inside Virginia Tech territory.

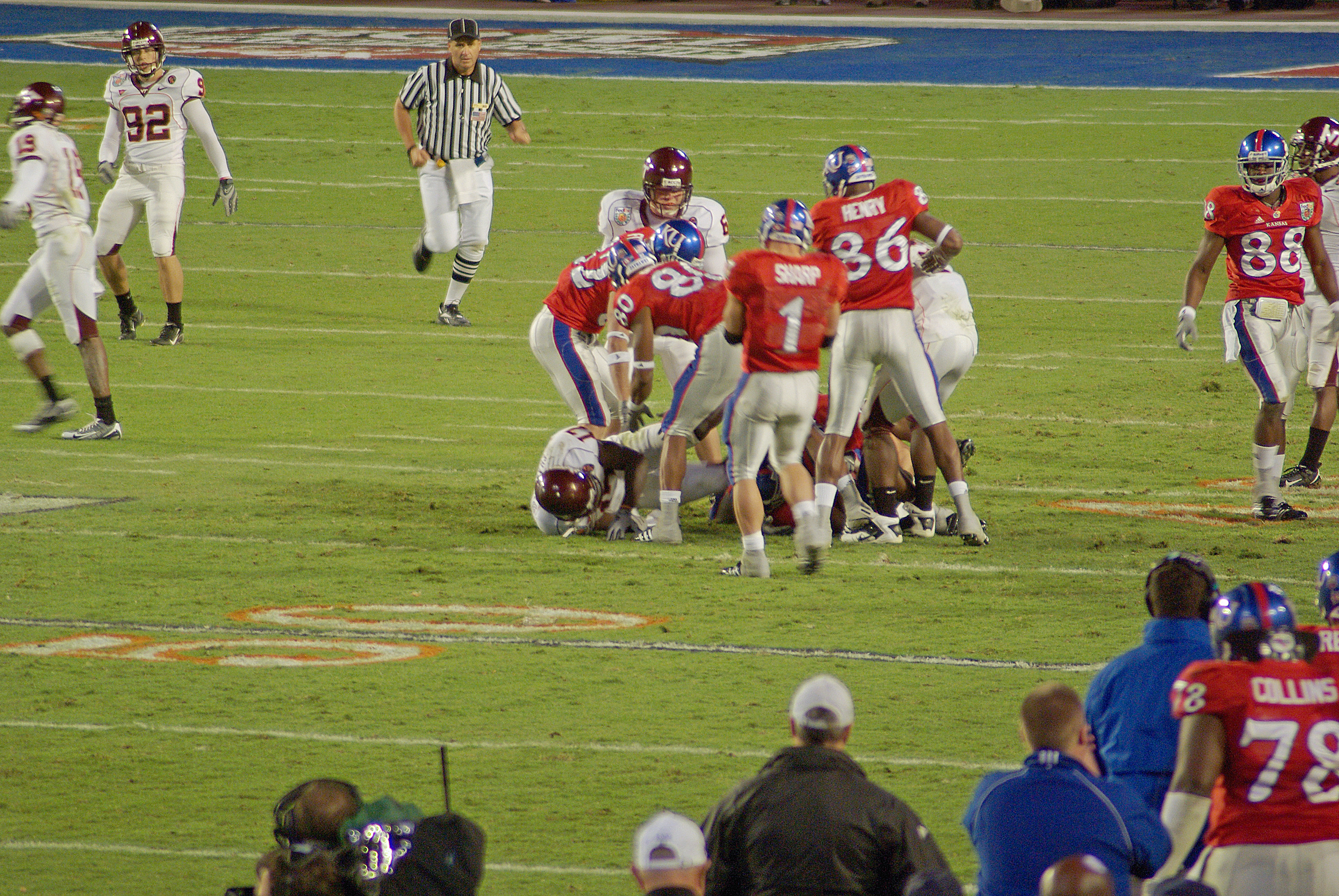
Kansas recovers Virginia Tech's last-ditch onside kick attempt.

Having stopped Kansas on fourth down, Virginia Tech took over on offense at its 22-yard line. With just 5:51 remaining in the game, the Hokies badly needed to score quickly and get a defensive stop in order to have a chance to win. The Hokies advanced on the first aspect of that requirement as Sean Glennon converted several first downs through the air. Kansas allowed no play over nine yards until late in the drive, forcing Virginia Tech to use up valuable time. On the last play of the drive, Sean Glennon connected on a 20-yard strike to Justin Harper for a touchdown. The score cut Kansas' lead to just three points, but with just three minutes remaining in the game, Virginia Tech's comeback would only be complete if the Hokies could recover a difficult onside kick.

Jud Dunlevy kicked the ball, which traveled the regulation 10 yards, but was recovered by Kansas. The Hokies, despite failing to recover the onside kick, still had a chance for another offensive possession if they stopped Kansas' offense short of a first down. Because the Hokies had two timeouts remaining, they could stop the clock after two Kansas plays, thus preserving time for a Virginia Tech offensive drive. An 11-yard pass by Todd Reesing netted Kansas a first down, however, and subsequent runs by the Jayhawks allowed Kansas to run out the clock despite the Virginia Tech timeouts. Kansas preserved its lead by kneeling on the ball inside the Virginia Tech 5-yard line on the final plays of the game, and the 24–21 victory was celebrated as time ran out.

== Final statistics ==
Statistical comparison
	KU	VT
1st downs	19	20
Total yards	344	306
Passing yards	249	177
Rushing yards	95	135
Penalties	5–70	4–27
3rd down conversions	6–17	7–17
4th down conversions	2–3	1–1
Turnovers	1	3
Time of Possession	33:47	26:13

Kansas' Aqib Talib was named the game's Most Valuable Player. Talib's 60-yard interception return for a touchdown was the Orange Bowl's first since the 1968 Orange Bowl, when Oklahoma's Bob Stephenson performed the same feat. When he appeared on stage on the field after the game to receive his award, Talib exclaimed, "I felt like Deion!", a reference to former NFL star Deion Sanders.

The two teams finished with extremely similar statistical totals, as befitting a close game. The two teams were within 38 total yards of each other; Kansas had 344 yards and Virginia Tech had 306. That relative closeness was reflected in the teams' first-down totals as well. Virginia Tech earned 20 first downs: 10 rushing, eight passing, and two via penalty. Kansas, meanwhile, earned 19 first downs: five rushing, 13 passing, and one via penalty.

Over two-thirds of Kansas' offense came through the air as the Jayhawks racked up 249 net passing yards. The Hokies, meanwhile, earned almost half their offense on the ground. The end result of the varying offensive strategies was much the same, however. Kansas successfully converted six of its 17 third-down attempts, while Virginia Tech converted seven of its 17 attempts. The time of possession was one key stat in favor of Kansas, as Kansas controlled the ball for 33:47, over 7 minutes more than Virginia Tech's possession time of 26:13.

The difference in the game came from special teams and turnovers. Virginia Tech turned the ball over three times, while Kansas turned the ball over just once. Kansas converted its three takeaways into 17 points, giving the Jayhawks an enormous advantage on the scoreboard. Virginia Tech failed to convert its sole turnover recovery into any points.

=== Virginia Tech statistical recap ===
Individual Leaders
Virginia Tech Passing
	C/ATT	Yds	TD	INT
S. Glennon	13/28	160	1	2
T. Taylor	1/3	11	0	1
Virginia Tech Rushing
	Car	Yds	TD	LG
B. Ore	23	116	1	14
K. Lewis	4	22	0	9
J. Morgan	1	3	0	3
Virginia Tech Receiving
	Rec	Yds	TD	LG
J. Harper	4	64	1	24
J. Morgan	3	30	0	13
G. Boone	2	44	0	37
E. Royal	1	11	0	11

On offense, the Hokies largely kept up with the Jayhawks, despite a losing effort. The two-quarterback system that had been heavily promoted heading into the game was largely abandoned in the first quarter after freshman Tyrod Taylor was sacked on his first two plays and threw an interception that was returned for a touchdown during his second time on the field. After those two abortive first-quarter appearances, and a single play at the beginning of the second quarter, Taylor did not re-enter the game until a single play halfway through the fourth quarter. With Taylor largely removed from the game, junior Sean Glennon was left to fill the gaps. Glennon had a solid, if unspectacular, game, completing 13 of his 28 passes for 160 yards and a touchdown. Glennon did struggle at times against the Jayhawks' defense, however, throwing two interceptions that resulted in 10 Kansas points.

With Glennon behind center, the Virginia Tech offense utilized several different wide receivers in the passing game. Eight different players caught at least one pass, and the leading receiver, Justin Harper, hauled in four catches for 64 yards and a touchdown. Receiver Josh Morgan, meanwhile, caught three passes, bringing him to 122 receptions for his career, passing Antonio Freeman for second place all-time at Virginia Tech. Ernest Wilford remains first in the Virginia Tech record book, with 126 receptions.

The Hokies were slightly more effective rushing the ball. In the ground game, seven different players carried the ball at least once, netting 135 rushing yards. Branden Ore finished the game with 116 yards, leading all rushers on both teams. That total put him just eight yards short of his second-straight 1,000-yard season. Ore's total is even more impressive when one considers he had been suspended for the entire first quarter of the game, his place taken by backup rusher Kenny Lewis, Jr. Lewis finished the game with four carries for 22 yards, and did not see much action after Ore entered the game at the beginning of the second quarter.

On special teams, the Hokies had several highs and lows. Justin Harper's 84-yard punt-return touchdown sparked a Virginia Tech rally that brought the Hokies within striking distance, but failures on special teams also ended the rally and turned the momentum of the game against Virginia Tech. Kicker Jud Dunlevy had been the third-most accurate kicker in the nation heading into the Orange Bowl, having hit 21 of his 24 field goal attempts during the season. He only needed two field goals to break Tech's record for most field goals in the season, set at 22 by Shayne Graham in 1998. Though Dunlevy had two chances for field goals, one fell short and the other was blocked.

On defense, the Hokies were led by linebacker Vince Hall, who recorded seven solo tackles, one assisted tackle, and one pass break-up. Hokies' defender Orion Martin also had a big game, recording six solo tackles, one assisted tackle, and two sacks of Kansas quarterback Todd Reesing. Two other defensive players recorded one sack apiece, and D.J. Parker recorded the Hokies' sole interception on defense.

=== Kansas statistical recap ===
Individual Leaders
Kansas Passing
	C/ATT	Yds	TD	INT
T. Reesing	20/37	227	1	1
Kansas Rushing
	Car	Yds	TD	LG
B. McAnderson	15	75	0	28
J. Sharp	9	33	0	9
Kansas Receiving
	Rec	Yds	TD	LG
D. Fields	7	101	0	37
J. Sharp	4	30	0	18
K. Meier	4	44	0	15
M. Henry	2	24	1	15
D. Briscoe	2	20	0	14

On offense, the Jayhawks recorded a total of 344 yards, 249 of which came through the air. Quarterback Todd Reesing was the key contributor to the Kansas aerial attack, completing 20 of his 37 passes for 227 yards and just one interception. The only other Kansas player to record passing yards was running back Brandon McAnderson, who threw a 22-yard first-down pass during a fake punt. Though under pressure for much of the game, Reesing was sacked four times, Kansas continued to maintain an effective pass attack throughout the game.

Eight different receivers caught at least one pass, with Dexton Fields leading all receivers in the game with seven catches for 101 yards. Both totals were the highest marks recorded in the game by either team. Fields was also the recipient of a play that tied for the longest pass play of the game, a 37-yard toss from Reesing halfway through the third quarter. Cornerback and game MVP Aqib Talib came into the game as a receiver several times, but because his appearance in the game was such an unusual occurrence, the Virginia Tech defense was able to zero in on him and prevent him from catching the ball.

The Jayhawks' ground game was less effective than their pass offense, but still had success against a tough Virginia Tech defense. Running back Brandon McAnderson, Kansas' leading rusher, finished the game with 15 carries for 75 yards. Backup running back Jake Sharp rushed nine times for 33 yards, including several key first-down runs.

As successful as Kansas' offense was, it was the Jayhawks' special teams (beating Virginia Tech coach Frank Beamer at his own game) that earned them the victory. Kansas blocked one Virginia Tech field goal, and caused Tech kicker Jud Dunlevy to miss another short. Kansas punter Kyle Tucker did an excellent job pinning Virginia Tech deep in its own end of the field, kicking the ball five times for a total of 250 yards, averaging 50 yards a punt. His longest punt, a 62-yard kick, was one of three punts that were downed inside Tech's 20-yard line.

The Kansas defense, which had been ill-regarded heading into the game, performed well, as MVP Aqib Talib finished the game with five tackles in addition to the interception he returned for a touchdown. The Jayhawks' leading tackler was Mike Rivera, who earned 12 tackles, including one sack of quarterback Sean Glennon. Altogether, the Jayhawks sacked Virginia Tech's quarterbacks five times, including two sacks on the opening drive of the game.

== Postgame effects ==
Kansas' victory in the 2008 Orange Bowl had far-reaching effects for both Virginia Tech and Kansas as well as college football teams around the country. The victory allowed Kansas to finish its 2007 season with a final record of 12–1, while the loss brought Virginia Tech to a final record of 11–3. The game itself provided tens of millions of dollars of economic impact for the South Florida region, which attracted tens of thousands of visitors from both Virginia and Kansas. In Kansas, bars and liquor stores benefited from the game, as Jayhawks' fans stocked up on food and alcohol for the game.

A bet on the game between the governors of Kansas and Virginia was resolved when Virginia Governor Tim Kaine sent a Virginia smoked ham to the Kansas state capitol. Had Virginia Tech won, Kansas Governor Kathleen Sebelius would have sent Kaine an assortment of Kansas beef.

=== Virginia Tech ===
The Hokies' loss to Kansas lowered its bowl winning percentage since 1993 to 40 percent. In the 15 bowl games played between the 1993 Independence Bowl and the 2008 Orange Bowl, the Hokies amassed a record of six wins and nine losses. Despite the loss to the Jayhawks and the loss of several graduating players, Virginia Tech was a popular pick to repeat as ACC champions heading into the off-season. The seniors who graduated following the Orange Bowl game were the winningest team in Virginia Tech history, becoming one of just three teams in Division I to win at least 10 games each of the previous four years. Junior Sean Glennon's second consecutive failure to win a bowl game, however, re-opened the question of whether he or Tyrod Taylor would be the Hokies' starter at quarterback in 2008.

=== Kansas ===
Kansas' victory over Virginia Tech was the Jayhawks' fifth bowl victory and was the 11th bowl game in the history of the Kansas Jayhawks football team. Because of the unexpected nature of the Jayhawks' success, some pundits proclaimed the 2008 Orange Bowl as ranking among the greatest Kansas sports victories of all time. The game paid $17 million to the Big 12 Conference and helped to boost the Kansas football team's national profile among potential recruits. In addition, the program saw an increase in ticket sales in the years immediately following the bowl appearance. Three months after the football team's Orange Bowl win, the men's basketball team won the National Championship becoming only the second school to win a BCS Bowl game and National Championship in basketball in the same school year. Additionally the 49 wins combined from the football team and basketball team were the most combined wins in NCAA history from a football team and men's basketball team.

=== 2008 NFL draft ===
The 2008 Orange Bowl provided an excellent national platform for players from both Kansas and Virginia Tech to impress National Football League scouts prior to the 2008 NFL draft, held April 26 and April 27, 2008. Virginia Tech cornerback Brandon Flowers was one of the first Orange Bowl participants to announce his intent to enter the draft following the game. Flowers, a redshirt junior, finished the season with five interceptions.

Two Kansas players announced that they would leave early for the NFL. Aqib Talib, the game's MVP, and All-American Anthony Collins announced they would enter the 2008 draft, capitalizing on their successful season. In total, twelve players from that game were drafted, eight from Virginia Tech and four from Kansas.
