= Lee Suggs =

American football player (born 1980)

No. 44, 22
- Position: Running back

Personal information
- Born: August 11, 1980 (age 46); Roanoke, Virginia, U.S.
- Listed height: 6 ft 0 in (1.83 m)
- Listed weight: 210 lb (95 kg)

Career information
- College: Virginia Tech
- NFL draft: 2003: 4th round, 115th overall pick

Career history
- Cleveland Browns (2003–2005); Miami Dolphins (2006)

Awards and highlights
- Third-team All-American (2000); Big East Co-Offensive Player of The Year (2000); 2× Dudley Award (2000, 2002)

Career NFL statistics
- Rushing attempts: 269
- Rushing yards: 1,074
- Rushing touchdowns: 4
- Receptions: 28
- Receiving yards: 217
- Receiving touchdowns: 1
- Stats at Pro Football Reference

Lee Ernest Suggs Jr. (born August 11, 1980) is an American former professional football player who was a running back in the National Football League (NFL). He played college football for the Virginia Tech Hokies and was selected by the Cleveland Browns in the fourth round of the 2003 NFL draft. He also played for the Miami Dolphins.

== Early life ==
Suggs attended high school at William Fleming High School. During his 1998 senior year in high school, he rushed for 2,918 yards and 30 touchdowns, capping a prolific high school career and helping boost his ranking among running backs to fourth in the state and 19th in the nation, according to the SuperPrep scouting organization.

== College career ==
While at Virginia Tech he set, and still holds the NCAA Division I Football Bowl Subdivision (FBS) records for most games scoring a touchdown in a single season (14 games in 2002), and for most consecutive games scoring a touchdown (27 consecutive games, from September 2, 2000, through December 31, 2002; 54 touchdowns). Suggs also holds school records for rushing touchdowns in a season (27) and rushing touchdowns in a career (53). His accomplishments at the university earned him a spot in the Virginia Tech Sports Hall of Fame.

== Professional career ==
=== Cleveland Browns ===
Suggs was selected by the Cleveland Browns with the 18th pick in the fourth round and 115th overall of the 2003 NFL draft. In Week 17 of the 2003 season, Suggs rushed for 186 yards on 26 carries for two touchdowns against the Cincinnati Bengals to help the Browns finish with a 22–14 victory. One of his touchdown runs that day went 78 yards long. In 2004, Suggs had his best year as a pro, gaining 922 yards from scrimmage in only 10 games. He was unable to play a full season due to several injuries as well as the acquisition of Reuben Droughns. On August 14, 2006, Suggs was traded to the New York Jets for defensive back Derrick Strait, but the trade was voided when Suggs failed his physical, and returned to the Browns. He was subsequently cut by the Browns.

=== Miami Dolphins ===
Suggs was claimed off waivers by the Miami Dolphins on September 3, 2006. He was released by the Dolphins on October 10, 2006.

== Coaching career ==
Suggs was most recently the running back coach at the Catholic University of America, with his tenure at the school ending sometime prior to the 2021 season. He began his coaching career at Oberlin College as running backs coach in 2008.

== See also ==
- List of NCAA major college football yearly scoring leaders

Awards and achievements
Preceded by Cyrus Lawrence	Virginia Tech career rushing touchdowns record 2002–present (53)	Succeeded by current
Preceded by Tommy Francisco; James Barber	Virginia Tech single-season rushing touchdowns record 2000–present (27)	Succeeded by current
