= Cam Phillips =

American gridiron football player (born 1995)

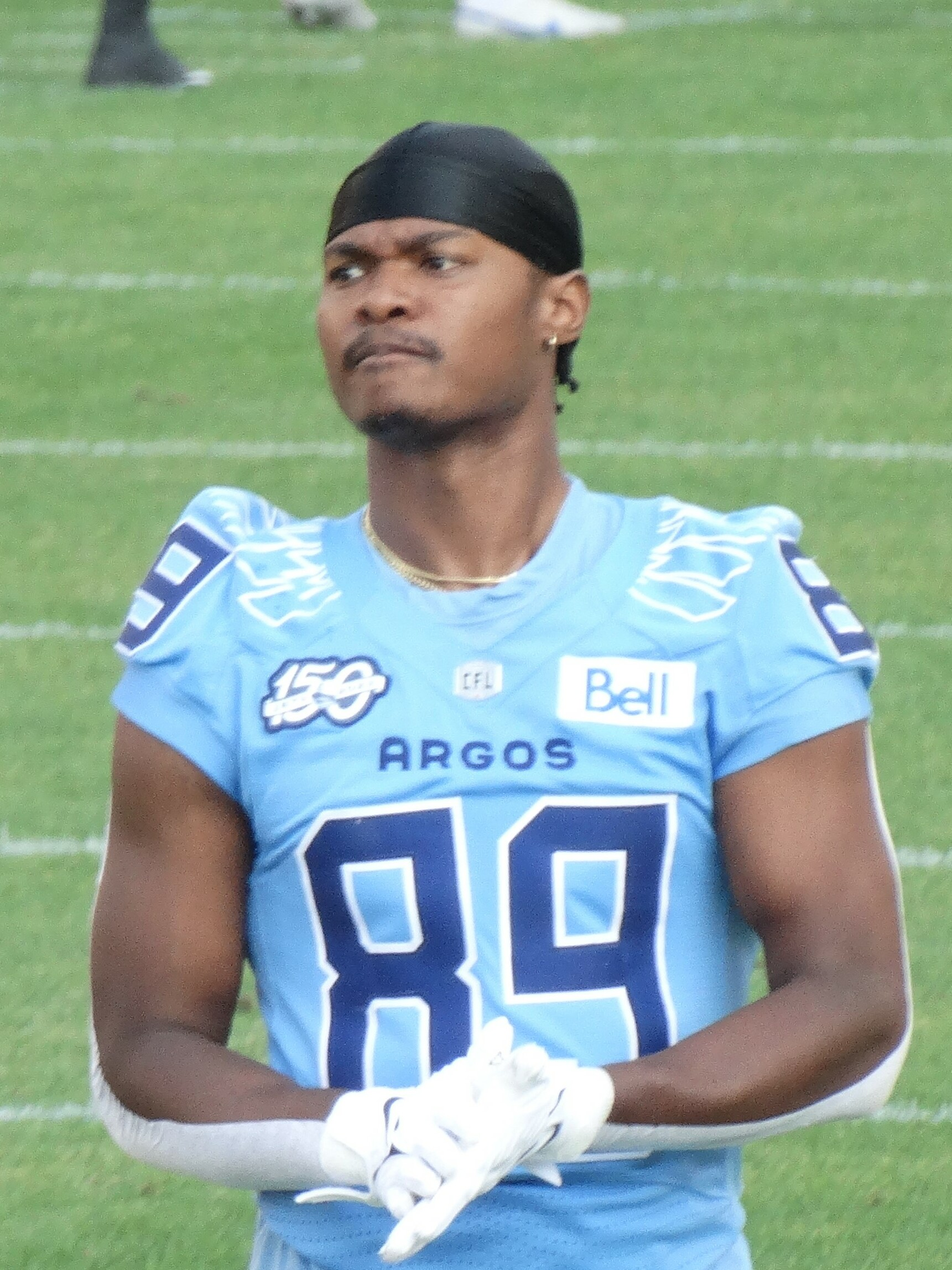
- Phillips with the Toronto Argonauts in 2023

Virginia Tech Hokies
- Title: Assistant wide receivers coach & quality control coach

Personal information
- Born: December 16, 1995 (age 30); Charlotte, North Carolina, U.S.
- Listed height: 6 ft 0 in (1.83 m)
- Listed weight: 202 lb (92 kg)

Career information
- High school: DeMatha Catholic (Hyattsville, Maryland)
- College: Virginia Tech
- NFL draft: 2018: undrafted

Career history

Playing
- Buffalo Bills (2018–2019); Houston Roughnecks (2020); Carolina Panthers (2020)*; Hamilton Tiger-Cats (2021)*; Toronto Argonauts (2021–2023)
- * Offseason or practice squad member only

Coaching
- Virginia Tech (2024–present) Assistant wide receivers coach & quality control coach

Awards and highlights
- Grey Cup champion (2022); XFL receiving yards leader (2020); Mid Season All-XFL (2020); First-team All-ACC (2017)

Career NFL statistics
- Receptions: 1
- Receiving yards: 9
- Stats at Pro Football Reference

Career CFL statistics
- Targets: 125
- Receptions: 77
- Receiving yards: 1,096
- Receiving Touchdowns: 4
- Stats at CFL.ca

Cameron Darnell Phillips (born December 16, 1995) is an American college football coach and former professional player who is a coach for the Virginia Tech Hokies. He played as a wide receiver in the National Football League (NFL). Phillips played collegiately at Virginia Tech, where he is the all-time leader in receptions and receiving yards.

== Professional career ==
=== Buffalo Bills ===
Phillips signed with the Buffalo Bills as an undrafted free agent on May 11, 2018. He was waived on September 1, 2018 and was signed to the practice squad the next day. He was promoted to the active roster on October 18, 2018. He was waived on November 5, 2018 and was re-signed to the practice squad. He signed a reserve/future contract with the Bills on December 31, 2018.

On August 31, 2019, Phillips was waived by the Bills.

=== Houston Roughnecks ===
On October 15, 2019, Phillips was drafted in the sixth round of the 2020 XFL draft by the Houston Roughnecks. In the Roughnecks' first game against the Los Angeles Wildcats, Phillips helped score a 50-yard touchdown, giving the Roughnecks their first points and helping the team win a 37–17 victory against the Wildcats. In Week 2 against the St. Louis BattleHawks, Phillips caught seven balls for 54 yards and scored three touchdowns, winning the XFL's Star of the Week. In Week 3 Phillips caught three touchdowns again, to go along with 8 receptions for 194 yards, including an 84 yard score from PJ Walker. His performance in week 3 proved to be enough for Phillips to win his second straight XFL Star of the Week. In what turned out to be the final week of the XFL season, Phillips hauled in 10 receptions for 122 yards and 2 touchdowns. Phillips again earned Player of the Week for his performance. Phillips finished the season with 31 receptions for a league high 455 yards and 9 touchdowns. He had his contract terminated when the league suspended operations on April 10, 2020.

=== Carolina Panthers ===
Phillips had a tryout with the Carolina Panthers on August 23, 2020, and signed with the team three days later. He was waived on September 5, 2020.

=== Hamilton Tiger-Cats ===
Phillips signed with the Hamilton Tiger-Cats of the CFL on June 10, 2021. Phillips was cut in the 3rd week of training camp on July 29, 2021.

=== Toronto Argonauts ===
On July 30, 2021, Phillips signed with the Toronto Argonauts. Phillips spend most of the 2021 season on the practice roster, but made his CFL debut in the last game of the season on November 16, 2021, against the Edmonton Elks, where he had two catches for 20 yards.

In 2022, Phillips was assigned to the practice roster after training camp, but was moved up to the active roster due to injuries in the Argonauts' receiving corps. He played and started in 12 regular season games where he had 38 receptions for 515 yards and three touchdowns. He made his post-season debut in the East Final against the Montreal Alouettes but did not record any catches. Phillips then played in his first Grey Cup game where he led all receivers with four catches for 96 yards as the Argonauts defeated the Winnipeg Blue Bombers in the 109th Grey Cup championship.

In the 2023 season, Phillips was an opening day starter and played in 12 regular season games where he had 37 receptions for 561 yards and one touchdown. He became a free agent upon the expiry of his contract on February 13, 2024.

== Career statistics ==
Year	League	Team	Games		Receiving				
Year	League	Team	GP	GS	Rec	Yds	Avg	Lng	TD
2018	NFL	BUF	2	0	1	9	9.0	9	0
2020	XFL	HOU	5	5	31	455	14.6	84	9
2021	CFL	TOR	1	0	2	20	10.0	13	0
2022	CFL	TOR	12	12	38	515	13.6	55	3
2023	CFL	TOR	12	12	37	561	15.2	76	1
Total			32	29	111	1,560	14.1	84	13

Awards and achievements
Preceded by Isaiah Ford	Virginia Tech career receptions record 2017–present (236)	Succeeded by current
Preceded by Donald Snell; Nick Cullen	Virginia Tech single-game receptions record 2017–present (14)	Succeeded by current
Preceded by Isaiah Ford	Virginia Tech career receiving record 2017–present (3,027 yards)	Succeeded by current
