= Branden Ore =

American football player (born 1986)

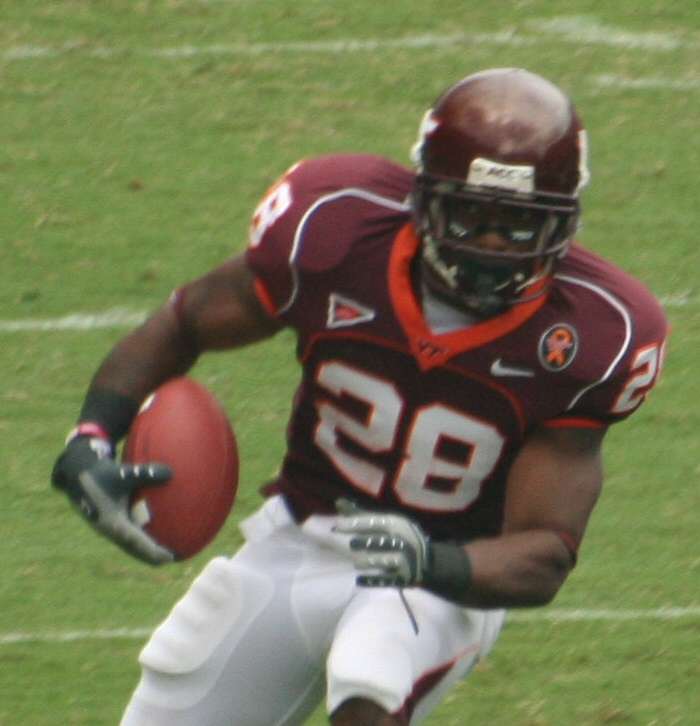
- Ore with Virginia Tech in 2007

No. 28
- Position: Running back

Personal information
- Born: February 17, 1986 (age 40); Norfolk, Virginia, U.S.
- Listed height: 5 ft 11 in (1.80 m)
- Listed weight: 205 lb (93 kg)

Career information
- High school: Indian River High School, Chesapeake, Virginia
- College: Virginia Tech (2004–2007); West Liberty University (2008)

Awards and highlights
- First-team All-ACC (2006)
- Stats at ESPN

Branden Ore (born February 17, 1986) is an American former college football running back for Virginia Tech.

== Early life ==
Branden Ore was born in Norfolk, Virginia. He attended Indian River High School. Ore committed to Virginia Tech on December 15th, 2003, receiving other offers from Maryland, Tennessee, North Carolina, and NC State.

College recruiting
Name	Hometown	School	Height	Weight	Commit date
Branden Ore; RB	Chesapeake, Virginia	Indian River High School	5 ft 11 in (1.80 m)	196 lb (89 kg)	Dec 15, 2003
Branden Ore; RB	Recruit ratings: Rivals:				
Overall recruit ranking:
Note: In many cases, Scout, Rivals, 247Sports, On3, and ESPN may conflict in their listings of height and weight.; In these cases, the average was taken. ESPN grades are on a 100-point scale.; Sources:

== College career ==
=== Virginia Tech ===
Ore began his college career as a redshirt freshman in 2004 at Virginia Tech behind Mike Imoh and Cedric Humes on the depth chart. Following the season, Ore underwent shoulder surgery and spent the spring semester rehabbing in Chesapeake.

In 2005, Ore finished his redshirt freshman year with 647 rushing yards across 109 carries, rushing for 6 touchdowns. He caught 5 passes for 36 yards. Ore was named ACC Rookie of the Week in back-to-back weeks after impressive games against Virginia and North Carolina, rushing for 115 and 104 yards, respectively.

Ore started every game his redshirt sophomore year, serving as the leading offensive player in the Hokies' 10-win 2006 season. Ore suffered an ankle injury during the final regular season game against Wake Forest, but still took the field against Georgia in the Hokies' 24-31 loss in the Chick-fil-A Bowl. By the end of the season, Ore rushed for 1,090 yards, scoring 14 touchdowns, earning All-ACC honors.

In the Hokies' 2007 season, Ore would once again lead Virginia Tech's offense, rushing for 992 yards and scoring 10 touchdowns. Ore helped the Hokies' win 11 games, including the ACC championship. Ore was benched for the first quarter of the 2008 Orange Bowl against Kansas as punishment for showing up late to Tech's final practice of the season. Despite this, Ore still led both teams in rushing yards, rushing for 116 yards and scoring 1 touchdown.

In January 2008, Ore declared for the 2008 NFL draft but later withdrew his name, intending to return to Virginia Tech his senior season. However, coach Frank Beamer dismissed Ore from the team on March 19, 2008, months before Virginia Tech's 2008 season, due to a culmination of off-the-field issues.

=== West Liberty ===
Ore transferred to Division II West Liberty, where he would become the starting tailback for the Hilltoppers. Ore stated that the secluded environment helped to resolve his disciplinary issues. At the conclusion of the 2008 season, Ore scored 20 touchdowns, a West Liberty record.

== Personal life ==
Ore testified in a federal drug case for a June 2006 traffic stop where drugs were found in his possession. He was not charged.
