= Sean Glennon =

American football player (born 1985)

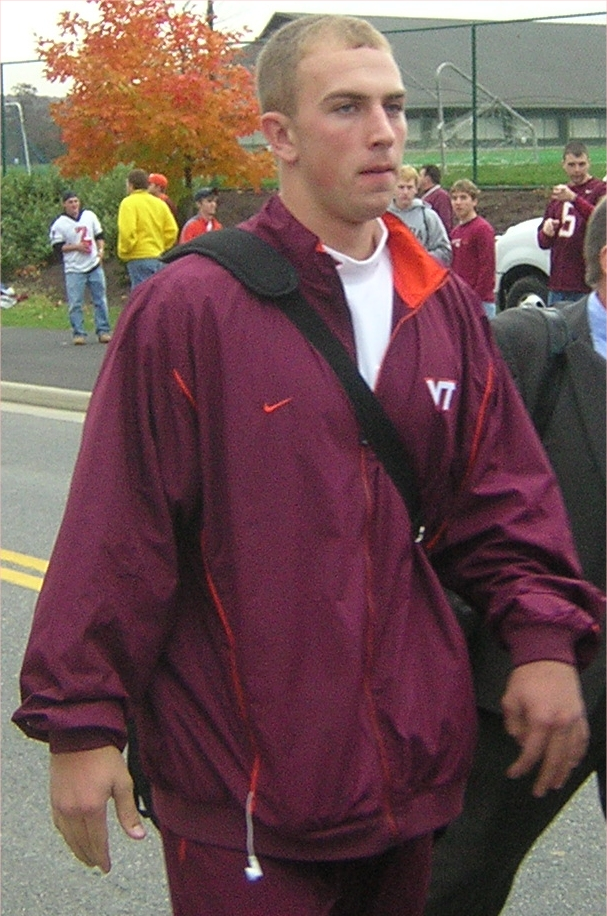
- Glennon with Virginia Tech in 2006

No. 7
- Position: Quarterback

Personal information
- Born: September 5, 1985 (age 41); The Woodlands, Texas, U.S.
- Listed height: 6 ft 4 in (1.93 m)
- Listed weight: 225 lb (102 kg)

Career information
- High school: Westfield (Chantilly, Virginia)
- College: Virginia Tech (2004–2008)
- NFL draft: 2009: undrafted

Career history
- Minnesota Vikings (2009)*
- * Offseason or practice squad member only

Sean Glennon (born September 5, 1985) is an American former football quarterback. He played college football for the Virginia Tech Hokies.

Glennon was named the starter following the dismissal of Marcus Vick and held that job until being replaced by Tyrod Taylor during the 2007 season. After Taylor was injured against Duke, Glennon reclaimed the starting duties and started every game that season. During the 2008 season, Virginia Tech split time between the two. Glennon's younger brother, Mike, played collegiately as a quarterback at NC State and for several teams in the NFL.

== Early life ==
Glennon was born in The Woodlands, Texas, to John and Nancy Glennon. John, his father, had a position with ExxonMobil that forced the family to move three times in Sean's grade-school years. From The Woodlands, the family would move to New Jersey, back to Texas, then finally to Centreville, Virginia, where they would stay for Glennon's high school years. His sister Katie also attended Virginia Tech. His brother Mike played for North Carolina State University, and was drafted by the Tampa Bay Buccaneers in the 2013 NFL draft.

Sean Glennon attended Westfield High School in Fairfax County, playing all four years at quarterback, and starting for the Westfield Bulldogs in his sophomore through senior seasons under head coach Tom Verbanic.

During his junior year, Glennon threw for over 1,700 yards and 21 touchdowns while rushing for another four touchdowns. Over the next year, his final (senior) season at Westfield High School, Glennon led the Bulldogs to a 14–0 record and the 2003 Virginia AAA Division 6 state championship, beating Landstown 35–14 . He passed for 1,840 yards, 26 touchdowns, and four interceptions during the championship campaign and added four touchdowns on the ground. Following the championship season, Glennon received numerous accolades as he finalized his search for a college choice. In total, Glennon amassed over 4,800 yards passing, 67 passing touchdowns (7th all-time in Virginia), eight rushing touchdowns, and only 11 interceptions.

He was elected to the Associated Press and Virginia Coaches' all-state teams, the Washington Post all-Metro first team, and was ranked No. 21 on the All Mid-Atlantic Team. He earned High School All-America honors from SuperPrep and PrepStar, in addition to being ranked the No. 4 high school player in the state by The Roanoke Times and the No. 3 high school player in the state by Rivals.com.

== College career ==
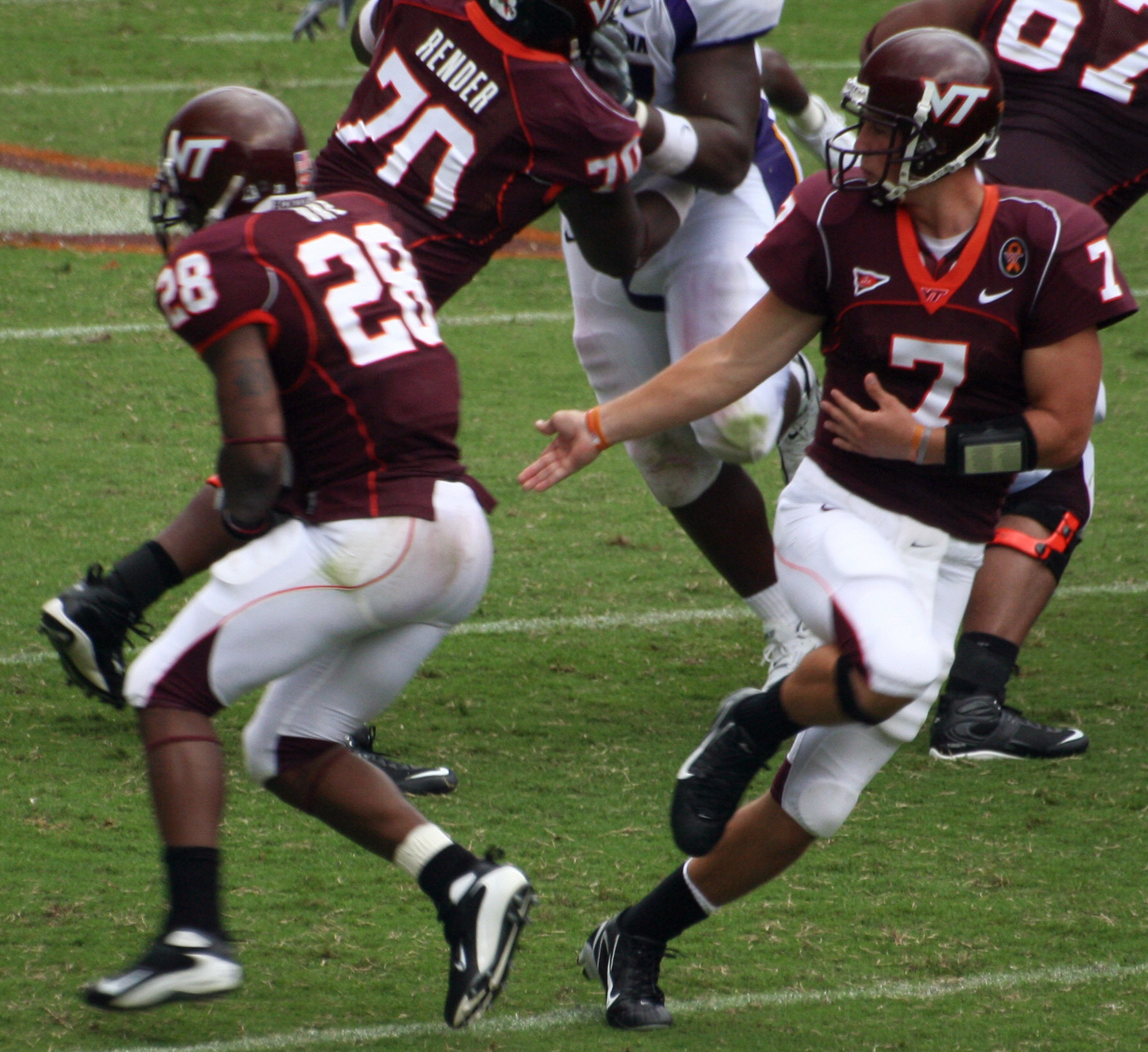
Glennon hands the ball off to Tech tailback Brandon Ore in the Hokies' 2007 opener against East Carolina

Due to his numerically successful high school career and the number of awards granted him, Glennon was widely recruited by college teams eager to find a stable quarterback. Most Atlantic Coast Conference schools were among those who recruited Glennon. Glennon eventually narrowed that list down to two: Georgia Tech and Virginia Tech. After visiting the campuses of each school, Glennon made his decision, committing to Virginia Tech on August 14, 2003.

=== 2004 ===
Despite his true freshman status, Glennon participated in four games during the 2004-2005 football season, playing primarily as a relief quarterback in blowouts over Western Michigan University and Florida A&M University.

He saw his first collegiate action on September 11, 2004, in Virginia Tech's 63–0 win over Western Michigan University. Glennon went 4-for-4, completing all of his passes, including a tipped ball that was blocked, caught, and recorded as a pass from Sean Glennon to Sean Glennon. His first pass was a 34-yard touchdown completion to receiver Justin Harper, and he later would record another, 33-yard touchdown pass to backup tight end Duane Brown.

His next action came in the October 16, 2004, homecoming game against Florida A&M University. Taking 40 total snaps in the game, Glennon directed two touchdown drives in the 62–0 blowout. In the game, Glennon went 4-for-7 for 58 yards.

=== 2005 ===
As Marcus Vick returned from his suspension from the Virginia Tech football team to assume the starting quarterback role, Sean Glennon asked for and was granted a redshirt season in 2005. Though still the emergency quarterback who would play in the event that Vick were injured, Glennon did not play and Cory Holt took on the quarterback duty in blowouts. Glennon's only action came in the Maroon-White scrimmage game, where he went 5-for-6 for 36 yards.

=== 2006 ===
Glennon was named the starting quarterback on August 13, 2006.

In the Hokies' season-opening win over Northeastern University, Glennon completed 15 of his 18 passes for a total of 222 yards, three touchdowns, and one interception. He was removed from the game after the second series of the third quarter, having played the entire first half.

In the second game against the University of North Carolina, Glennon went 10-for-16 for 66 yards. In his third game against Duke, he recorded his first 300-yard passing performance with a 301-yard, 2 touchdown effort. He eclipsed the 300 yard mark again two weeks later vs. Georgia Tech, throwing for 339 yards on 27 of 53 attempts and a touchdown. He recorded his best game statistically of the season by completing 14 of 21 passes for 252 yards and two touchdowns vs. Wake Forest.

Glennon threw 3 interceptions in the final game of the season against the University of Georgia in the Chick-fil-A Bowl.

Glennon completed 170 of his 302 passing attempts in 2006 for 2,191 yards with 11 touchdowns and 11 interceptions.

During the season, Glennon was commonly chastized by Virginia Tech fans at Lane Stadium with the chant "We Want Ike" being called (reference to backup quarterback Ike Whitaker) during his poor performances.

=== 2007 ===
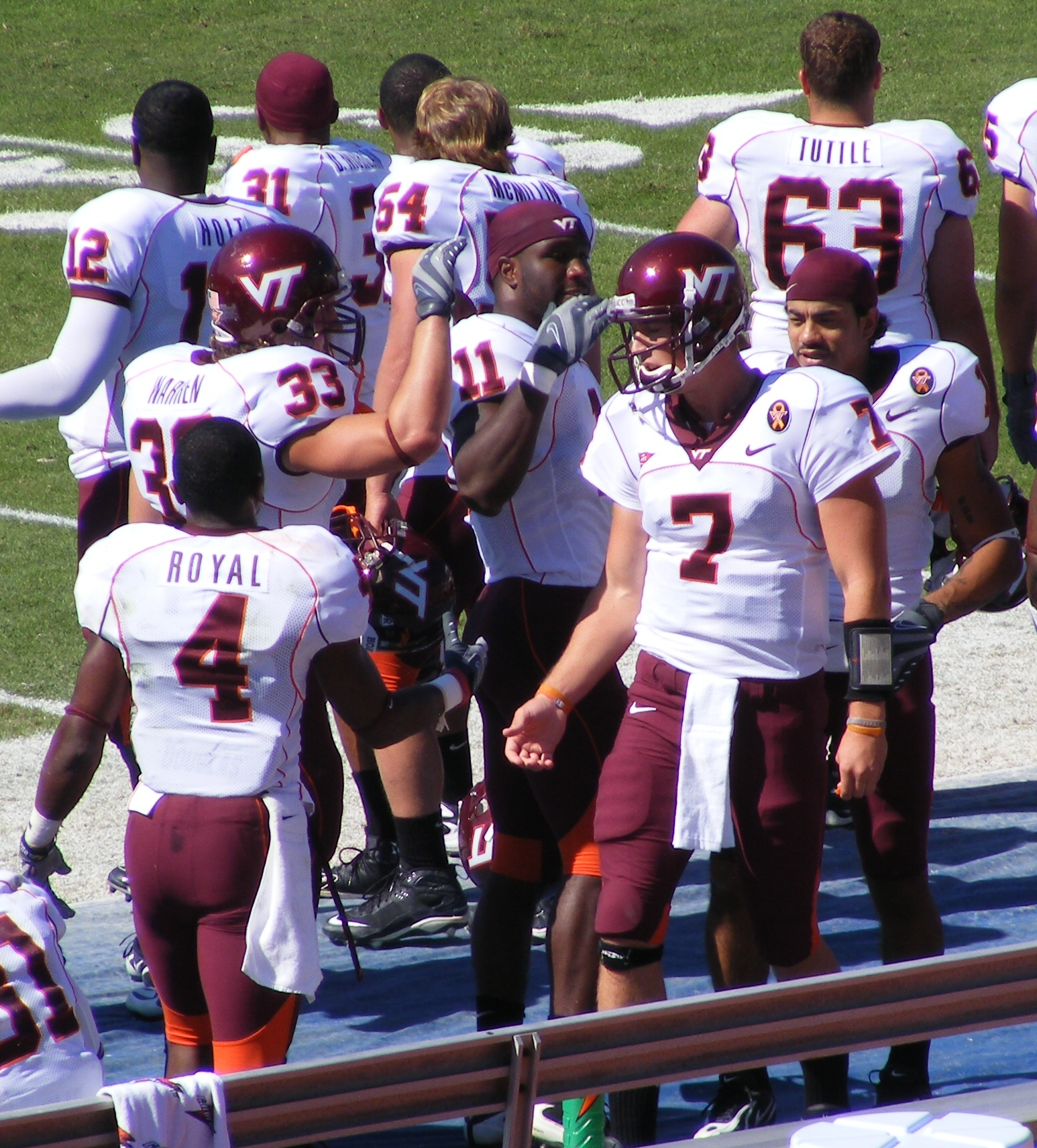
Glennon is congratulated by Eddie Royal after leading the Hokies to a touchdown in his first drive off of the bench in relief of the injured Tyrod Taylor

During winter testing, he set a new record for the bench press among Tech quarterbacks, pressing 375 pounds and surpassing the previous record held by Bryan Randall.

In the Hokies' 2007 opener against the East Carolina Pirates, Glennon completed 22 of his 33 passing attempts for 245 yards and one touchdown to tight end Sam Wheeler, after throwing an interception on the Hokies' first offensive snap.

During the Hokies second game of the season, a 48–7 loss to the LSU Tigers in Baton Rouge, Glennon was pulled from the game after struggling early and replaced with true freshman Tyrod Taylor. Glennon finished the game 2-of-10 passing for 16 yards, two sacks and one interception. Once Glennon was told he would not be starting he said that he may consider transferring for his final year if he cannot win back his starting position with the team.

After back-up duty during the next few games, Glennon returned during the second quarter against Duke after Tyrod Taylor left the game due to a sprained ankle. Glennon completed 16 of his 21 passes for 258 yards and two touchdowns. Glennon's 258 yards were the third most of his career and his personal best since the Hokies' September 30, 2006, loss to Georgia Tech.

On November 1, Glennon was forced to wear a Georgia Tech practice jersey after four Virginia Tech Hokies jerseys went missing from the visitors' locker room at Bobby Dodd Stadium. The Hokies won the game by a score of 27–3. In the game, Glennon went 22 of 33 for 296 yards and two touchdowns.

On December 1, Glennon was awarded the ACC Championship Game MVP award after leading the Hokies to a 30–16 victory over Boston College. In the game, Glennon went 18–27 with three touchdowns.

=== 2008 ===
Glennon started the first two games of the Hokies' 2008 season: a loss to the East Carolina Pirates and a victory over the Furman Paladins. Glennon completed 17 of his 31 passes for 181 yards, three interceptions, and one touchdown in his two starts. He was replaced by Tyrod Taylor for the Hokies' third game against Georgia Tech. Glennon played briefly in relief of Taylor against North Carolina, completing his only pass attempt.

Glennon came in a few weeks later against Florida State, where he threw for 122 yards and a touchdown before leaving the game with a sprained ankle. On a Thursday night two weeks later against Maryland, Glennon lead his team to victory with a 14–20, 127 yard 1 TD performance against the Terps.

=== College statistics ===
Year	Team	Games			Passing								Rushing			
Year	Team	GP	GS	Record	Cmp	Att	Pct	Yds	Avg	TD	Int	Rtg	Att	Yds	Avg	TD
2004	Virginia Tech	4	0	—	8	11	72.7	137	12.5	2	0	237.3	0	0	0.0	0
2005	Virginia Tech	0	0	—	Redshirt											
2006	Virginia Tech	13	13	10−3	170	302	56.3	2,191	7.3	11	11	122.0	63	-81	-1.3	1
2007	Virginia Tech	13	9	6−3	143	235	60.9	1,796	7.6	12	5	137.6	66	-43	-0.7	1
2008	Virginia Tech	9	4	2−2	65	108	60.2	743	6.9	3	5	117.9	41	-48	-1.2	1
Career		39	26	18−8	386	656	58.8	4,867	7.4	28	21	128.8	170	-172	-1.0	3

== Professional career ==
Glennon signed a contract with the Minnesota Vikings as an undrafted free agent. He was waived on June 19, 2009, and later returned. He was released again in August, and was not signed by another NFL team.
