= Isaiah Ford =

American football player and coach (born 1996)

Chicago Bears
- Title: Offensive quality control coach

Personal information
- Born: February 9, 1996 (age 30); Jacksonville, Florida, U.S.
- Listed height: 6 ft 2 in (1.88 m)
- Listed weight: 194 lb (88 kg)

Career information
- Position: Wide receiver (No. 84, 87)
- High school: Trinity Christian (Jacksonville)
- College: Virginia Tech (2014–2016)
- NFL draft: 2017: 7th round, 237th overall pick

Career history

Playing
- Miami Dolphins (2017–2020); New England Patriots (2020); Miami Dolphins (2020–2021); Indianapolis Colts (2022)*; Chicago Bears (2023)*
- * Offseason or practice squad member only

Coaching
- Chicago Bears (2026–present) Offensive quality control coach

Awards and highlights
- First-team All-ACC (2015); Second-team All-ACC (2016)

Career NFL statistics
- Receptions: 63
- Receiving yards: 681
- Receiving touchdowns: 2
- Stats at Pro Football Reference

Isaiah Alexander Ford (born February 9, 1996) is an American football coach and former player who is an offensive quality control coach for the Chicago Bears the National Football League (NFL). A wide receiver, he played college football for the Virginia Tech Hokies. He was selected by the Miami Dolphins in the seventh round of the 2017 NFL draft.

== Early life ==
Ford attended Trinity Christian Academy in Jacksonville, Florida. While there, he played high school football. As a senior, he had 717 yards receiving and 12 touchdowns. He was rated by Rivals.com as a three-star recruit and committed to Virginia Tech to play college football. Ford also played basketball in high school, averaging 37 points per game as a senior. Ford played AAU basketball with Grayson Allen for the Jacksonville Lee Bull.

== College career ==
As a true freshman at Virginia Tech, Ford played in all 13 games with 11 starts and had 56 receptions for 709 yards and six touchdowns. As a sophomore, he was named first-team All-Atlantic Coast Conference (ACC) and set Virginia Tech single-season records for receptions and touchdowns. As a junior, Ford was named second-team All-ACC, recording 73 receptions for 1,038 yards and seven touchdowns. After the season, Ford decided to forgo his senior year and enter the 2017 NFL draft.

== Professional career ==
Pre-draft measurables
Height	Weight	Arm length	Hand span	Wingspan	40-yard dash	10-yard split	20-yard split	20-yard shuttle	Three-cone drill	Vertical jump	Broad jump	Bench press
6 ft 1 in (1.85 m)	194 lb (88 kg)	32 5/8 in (0.83 m)	9 1/4 in (0.23 m)	6 ft 4 3/4 in (1.95 m)	4.58 s	1.59 s	2.63 s	4.29 s	6.94 s	35.5 in (0.90 m)	10 ft 7 in (3.23 m)	14 reps
All values from NFL Combine/Pro Day

=== Miami Dolphins (first stint) ===
Ford was selected by the Miami Dolphins in the seventh round, 237th overall, in the 2017 NFL draft. On August 18, 2017, he was placed on injured reserve after suffering a knee injury.

On September 1, 2018, Ford was waived by the Dolphins and was signed to the practice squad. He was promoted to the active roster on November 28, 2018.

On August 31, 2019, Ford was waived by the Dolphins and re-signed to the practice squad. He was promoted to the active roster on September 25, 2019. He was waived again on October 30 and re-signed to the practice squad. He was promoted to the active roster on November 27. In the 2019 season, he recorded 23 receptions for 244 receiving yards.

On April 17, 2020, Ford was re-signed to a one-year contract by the Dolphins.

=== New England Patriots ===
On November 3, 2020, Ford was traded to the New England Patriots in exchange for a conditional 2022 seventh-round draft pick. On December 5, Ford was waived by the Patriots.

=== Miami Dolphins (second stint) ===
Ford re-signed with the Dolphins' practice squad on December 14, 2020. He was elevated to the active roster on December 19 and December 22 for the team's weeks 15 and 16 games against the Patriots and Las Vegas Raiders, and reverted to the practice squad after each game. He was promoted to the active roster on December 30. The Dolphins declined to assign a restricted free agent tender to Ford at the start of the 2021 league year.

On July 16, 2021, Ford re-signed with the Dolphins. He was released on August 24. He was re-signed to the practice squad on September 6. On October 9, he was elevated to the active roster for the Dolphins' Week 5 game. He was signed to the active roster on October 23.

=== New York Giants ===
On June 7, 2022, Ford signed with the New York Giants.

=== Indianapolis Colts ===
On July 26, 2022, Ford signed with the Indianapolis Colts. He was released by the Colts on August 16.

=== Chicago Bears ===
On July 24, 2023, Ford signed with the Chicago Bears. He was placed on injured reserve on August 29, then released on September 6.

== Coaching career ==
Ford returned to the Bears as an offensive quality control coach on February 18, 2026.

Awards and achievements
Preceded by Isaiah Ford	Virginia Tech single-season receptions record 2016–present (79)	Succeeded by current
Preceded by André Davis	Virginia Tech single-season receiving record 2015–present (1,164 yards)	Succeeded by current
Preceded by Antonio Freeman	Virginia Tech career receiving touchdowns record 2016–present (24)	Succeeded by current
Preceded by Antonio Freeman; André Davis	Virginia Tech single-season receiving touchdowns record 2015–present (11)	Succeeded by current
