= Cyrus Lawrence =

American football player (1960–2022)

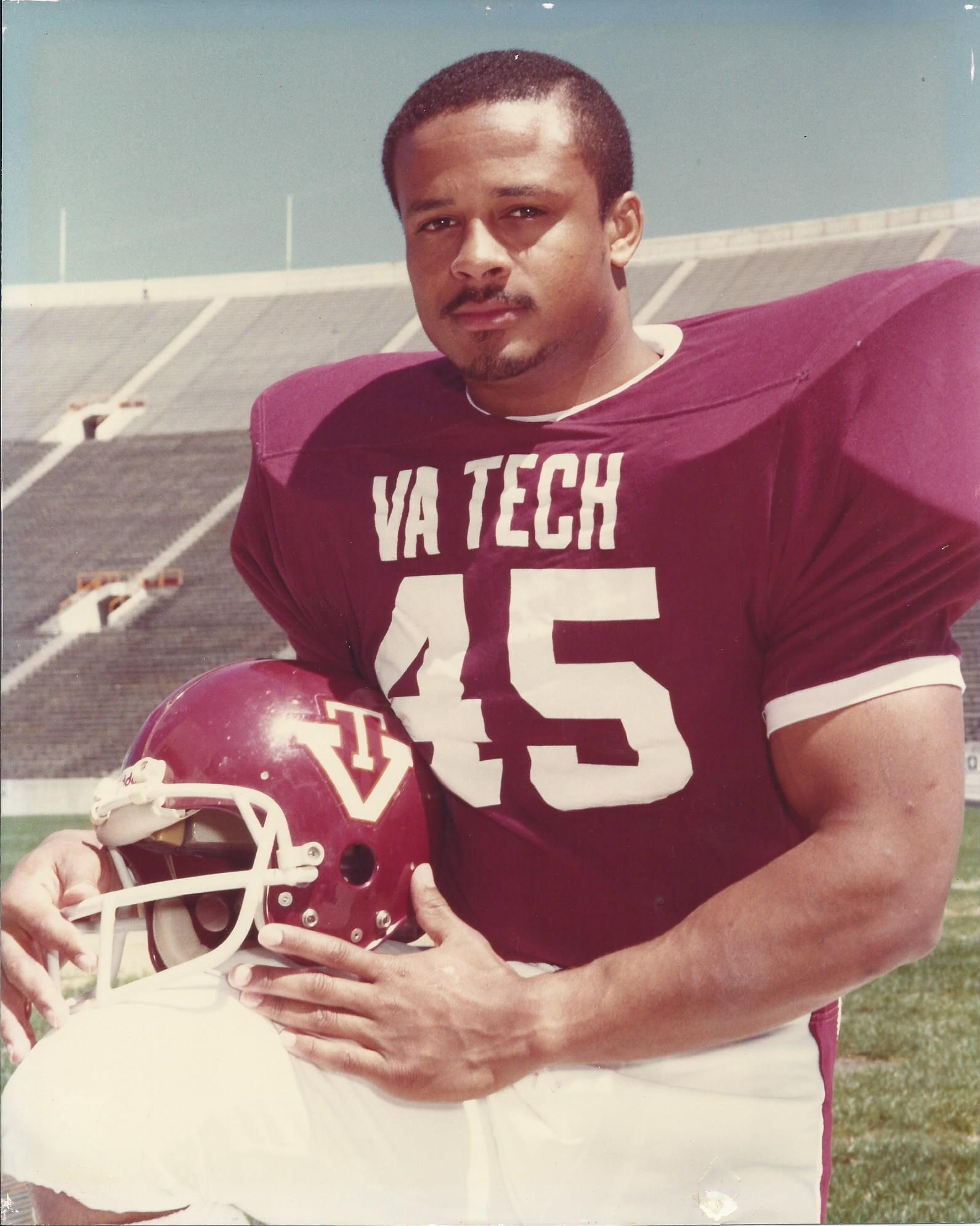

No. 45 – Virginia Tech Hokies
- Position: Running back

Personal information
- Born: November 15, 1960
- Died: September 2, 2022 (aged 61)
- Listed height: 5 ft 9 in (1.75 m)
- Listed weight: 203 lb (92 kg)

Career information
- High school: Southampton
- College: Virginia Tech (1979–1982)

Awards and highlights
- Virginia Tech Sports Hall of Fame (1997)

Cyrus Christopher Lawrence (November 15, 1960 – September 2, 2022) was the tailback for the Virginia Tech Hokies football team from 1979 until 1982. He finished his career at Tech as the school's all-time lead rusher, with a career total of 3,767 yards. Lawrence held the school's single-season rushing record of 1,403 yards until this mark was broken in 2003 by Kevin Jones. His accomplishments at Tech led to his induction into the school's sports hall of fame.

In the 1981 Peach Bowl against the Miami Hurricanes, Lawrence scored the Hokies' only touchdown.

Lawrence died on September 2, 2022.

Awards and achievements
Preceded by Roscoe Coles	Virginia Tech career rushing record 1982–present (3,767 yards)	Succeeded by current
