= List of Virginia Tech Hokies football seasons =

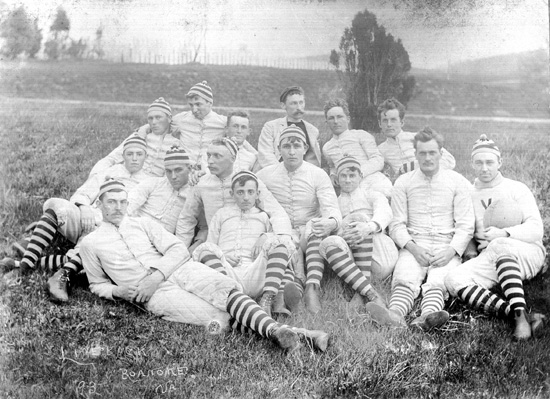
Since the team's first competition in 1892, Tech has played in over 1,100 sanctioned football games.

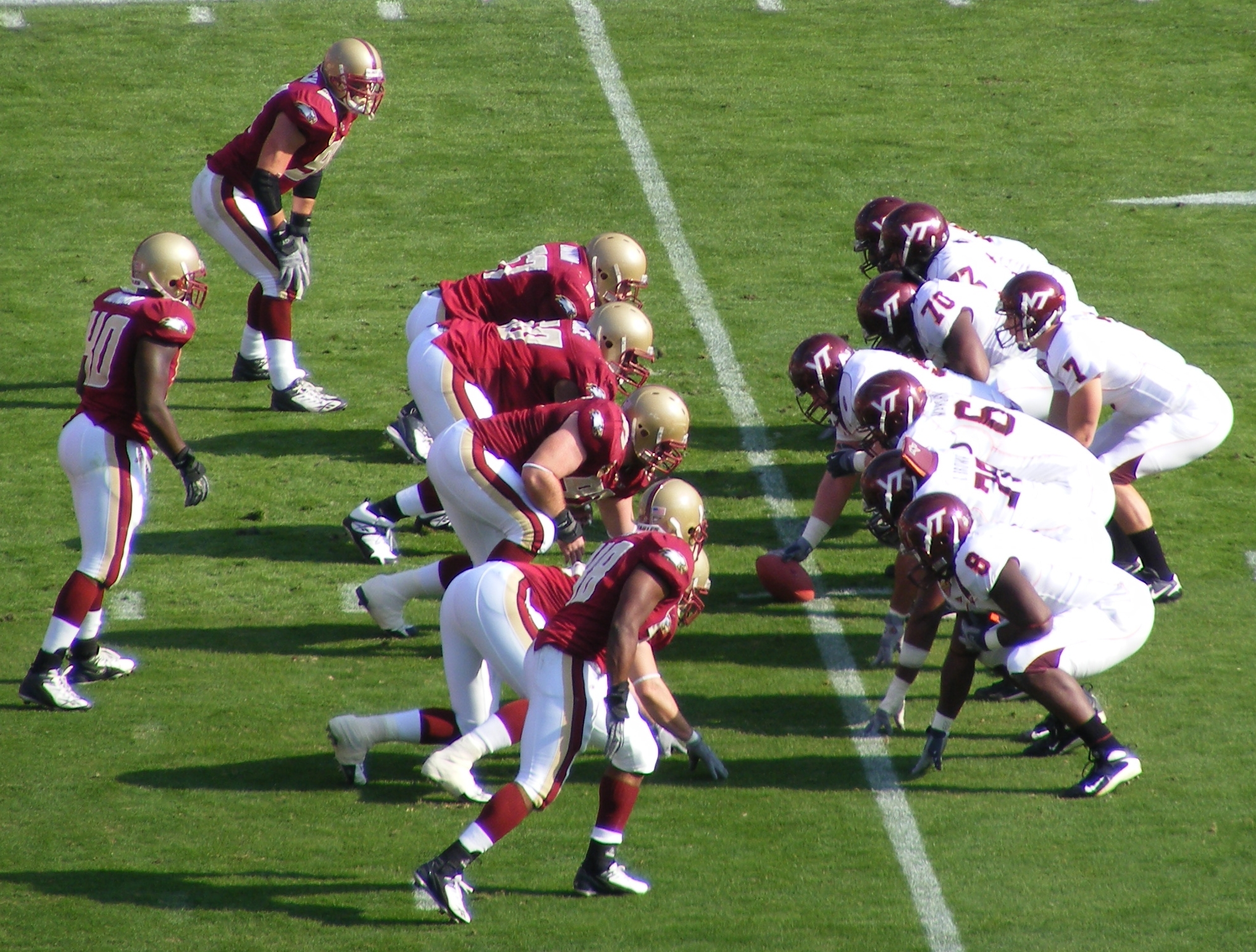
Virginia Tech faced the Boston College Eagles in the 2007 ACC Championship game, the final game of the 2007 regular season.

The Virginia Tech Hokies college football program are part of the National Collegiate Athletic Association (NCAA) Division I Football Bowl Subdivision (FBS). Since the team's creation in 1891 by professor Ellison A. Smyth—who coached the team in its first game, which was played the next year—the Hokies have participated in more than 1,100 officially sanctioned games, including 36 bowl games.

Historically, the Hokies have had limited success. From 1892 to 1921, Tech competed as a football independent. The Hokies won several games against larger, better-funded teams during this time, but did not compete in many games outside the American South. From 1921 to 1964, Tech was a member of the Southern Conference and won the conference championship in 1963. The membership of the Southern Conference fluctuated wildly at times during Tech's tenure. When the conference was created in 1921, it boasted 23 teams. This number was reduced when the Southeastern Conference and Atlantic Coast Conference split away in 1932 and 1953, respectively. By the time Tech won the conference championship in 1963, the conference's membership had shrunk to less than 10 teams. Tech administrators, wanting to expand the football program, chose to leave the conference and become a football independent once more.

Though Tech joined athletic conferences in other sports during the 1980s, it remained a football independent until 1991, when Virginia Tech became a member of the Big East conference. In 1993, Tech received an invitation to the Independence bowl, beginning a streak that has seen the Hokies invited to a bowl game at the conclusion of every season until 2020. In 1995, the Hokies defeated the Texas Longhorns in the 1995 Sugar Bowl, vaulting them into national prominence. During the early 2000s, Virginia Tech football teams were consistently ranked among the best in the country according to season-ending polls. In 2000, Virginia Tech participated in the 2000 Sugar Bowl, which served as the national championship game of the 1999 college football season. In addition to that appearance, the Hokies have participated in several other Bowl Championship Series games, which represent the highest tier of postseason accomplishment. In 2009, the Hokies defeated the Cincinnati Bearcats in the 2009 Orange Bowl.

Today, the Hokies are a member of the Atlantic Coast Conference (ACC) and have competed in that conference since 2004, when the Hokies left the Big East. Tech won three Big East conference championships prior to departing that conference, and since joining the ACC, the Hokies have won that conference four times.

== Seasons ==
National champions †	Conference champions *	Division champions ‡	Bowl game berth ^

Season	Head coach	Conference	Season results				Bowl result	Final ranking	
Season	Head coach	Conference	Conference finish	Wins	Losses	Ties (Note: Overtime rules in college football were introduced in 1996, making ties impossible.)	Bowl result	Associated Press Poll (Note: The Associated Press began conducting a weekly college football poll in 1936. Prior to 1936, polls were conducted by multiple organizations, but because Virginia Tech was unranked prior to the introduction of the AP poll, they are not listed here.)	Coaches' Poll (Note: The college football coaches' poll has been sponsored by multiple organizations since its creation in 1950. Its current sponsor is USA Today.)
Virginia Tech Hokies
1892	E. A. Smyth	Independent	—	1	1	0	—	N/A	N/A
1893	E. A. Smyth	Independent	—	0	2	0	—	N/A	N/A
1894	Joseph Massie	Independent	—	4	1	0	—	N/A	N/A
1895	A. C. Jones	Independent	—	4	2	0	—	N/A	N/A
1896	A. C. Jones	Independent	—	5 (Note: Virginia Tech's website lists the game against Alleghany Institute as a victory, but newspaper articles that ran in The Roanoke Times and The Richmond Dispatch list Alleghany as the winner. However, there is a retraction stated in the following issue of The Roanoke Times that said the score should have been 20-0 Virginia Tech (Blacksburg) - thus, the Virginia Tech website is correct.)	2 (Note: Virginia Tech's website lists the game against Alleghany Institute as a victory, but newspaper articles that ran in The Roanoke Times and The Richmond Dispatch list Alleghany as the winner.)	1	—	N/A	N/A
1897	Charles Firth	Independent	—	5	2	0	—	N/A	N/A
1898	J. Lewis Ingles	SIAA	10th	3	2	0	—	N/A	N/A
1899	James Morrison	Independent	—	4	1	0	—	N/A	N/A
1900	Dr. Davis	Independent	—	3	3	1	—	N/A	N/A
1901	Archibald B. Morrison, Jr.	Independent	—	6	1	0	—	N/A	N/A
1902	R. R. Brown	Independent	—	3	2	1	—	N/A	N/A
1903	Charles Lueder	Independent	—	5	1	0	—	N/A	N/A
1904	John O'Connor	Independent	—	5	3	0	—	N/A	N/A
1905	Sally Miles	Independent	—	9	1	0	—	N/A	N/A
1906	Sally Miles	Independent	—	5	2	2	—	N/A	N/A
1907	C. R. Williams	Independent	—	7	2	0	—	N/A	N/A
1908	R. M. Brown	Independent	—	5	4	0	—	N/A	N/A
1909	Branch Bocock	Independent	—	6	1	0	—	N/A	N/A
1910	Branch Bocock	Independent	—	6	2	0	—	N/A	N/A
1911	L. W. Riess	Independent	—	6	1	2	—	N/A	N/A
1912	Branch Bocock	South Atlantic	5th	5	4	0	—	N/A	N/A
1913	Branch Bocock	South Atlantic	5th	7	1	1	—	N/A	N/A
1914	Branch Bocock	South Atlantic	—	6	2	1	—	N/A	N/A
1915	Branch Bocock	South Atlantic	—	4	4	0	—	N/A	N/A
1916	Jack Ingersell	South Atlantic	1st	7	2	0	—	N/A	N/A
1917	Charles Bernier	South Atlantic	—	6	2	1	—	N/A	N/A
1918	Charles Bernier	South Atlantic	1st	7	0	0	—	N/A	N/A
1919	Charles Bernier	South Atlantic	—	5	4	0	—	N/A	N/A
1920	Stanley Sutton	South Atlantic	—	4	6	0	—	N/A	N/A
1921	Ben Cubbage	South Atlantic	—	7	3	0	—	N/A	N/A
1922	Ben Cubbage	Southern (Note: The number and variety of teams participating in Southern Conference play fluctuated wildly during Tech's time as a member of the league. From a height of 23 members in the 1920s, membership declined at times to just nine teams by the 1960s.)	4th	8	1	1	—	N/A	N/A
1923	Ben Cubbage	Southern	7th	6	3	0	—	N/A	N/A
1924	Ben Cubbage	Southern	11th	4	2	3	—	N/A	N/A
1925	Ben Cubbage	Southern	10th	5	3	2	—	N/A	N/A
1926	Andy Gustafson	Southern	7th	5	3	1	—	N/A	N/A
1927	Andy Gustafson	Southern	14th	5	4	0	—	N/A	N/A
1928	Andy Gustafson	Southern	4th	7	2	0	—	N/A	N/A
1929	Andy Gustafson	Southern	13th	5	4	0	—	N/A	N/A
1930	Orville Neale	Southern	13th	5	3	1	—	N/A	N/A
1931	Orville Neale	Southern	19th	3	4	2	—	N/A	N/A
1932	Henry Redd	Southern (Note: In 1932, 13 teams of the 23-team Southern Conference split off to form the new Southeastern Conference.)	4th	8	1	0	—	N/A	N/A
1933	Henry Redd	Southern	7th	4	3	3	—	N/A	N/A
1934	Henry Redd	Southern	6th	5	5	0	—	N/A	N/A
1935	Henry Redd	Southern	5th	4	3	2	—	N/A	N/A
1936	Henry Redd	Southern	11th	5	5	0	—	—	N/A
1937	Henry Redd	Southern	12th	5	5	0	—	—	N/A
1938	Henry Redd	Southern	10th	3	5	2	—	—	N/A
1939	Henry Redd	Southern	12th	4	5	1	—	—	N/A
1940	Henry Redd	Southern	10th	5	5	0	—	—	N/A
1941	James Kitts	Southern	6th	6	4	0	—	—	N/A
1942	S. D. Tilson and Herbert McEver	Southern	2nd	7	2	1	—	—	N/A
1943	Virginia Tech did not play football during the 1943 and 1944 seasons because of World War II								
1944	Virginia Tech did not play football during the 1943 and 1944 seasons because of World War II								
1945	Herbert McEver	Southern	9th	2	6	0	—	—	N/A
1946	James Kitts	Southern	7th	3	4	3	Lost 1947 Sun Bowl to Cincinnati Bearcats, 6–18	—	N/A
1947	James Kitts	Southern	8th	4	5	0	—	—	N/A
1948	Bob McNeish	Southern	15th	0	8	1	—	—	N/A
1949	Bob McNeish	Southern	14th	1	7	2	—	—	N/A
1950	Bob McNeish	Southern	16th	0	10	0	—	—	—
1951	Frank Moseley	Southern	16th	2	8	0	—	—	—
1952	Frank Moseley	Southern	6th	5	6	0	—	—	—
1953	Frank Moseley	Southern (Note: In 1953, seven teams left the 16-team Southern Conference to form the Atlantic Coast Conference. The next year, fellow Southern Conference member Virginia also left the conference for the ACC.)	6th	5	5	0	—	—	—
1954	Frank Moseley	Southern	3rd	8	0	1	—	16	—
1955	Frank Moseley	Southern	2nd	6	3	1	—	—	—
1956	Frank Moseley	Southern	2nd	7	2	1	—	—	—
1957	Frank Moseley	Southern	8th	4	6	0	—	—	—
1958	Frank Moseley	Southern	2nd	5	4	1	—	—	—
1959	Frank Moseley	Southern	3rd	6	4	0	—	—	—
1960	Frank Moseley	Southern	4th	6	4	0	—	—	—
1961	Jerry Claiborne	Southern	7th	4	5	0	—	—	—
1962	Jerry Claiborne	Southern	6th	5	5	0	—	—	—
1963	Jerry Claiborne	Southern	1st	8	2	0	—	—	—
1964	Jerry Claiborne	Southern	2nd	6	4	0	—	—	—
1965	Jerry Claiborne	Independent (Note: Tech left the Southern Conference in 1965 for various financial and structural reasons. Tech wanted to schedule more large schools but was prevented from doing so by the Southern Conference schedule. In addition, The Hokies hoped to join the Atlantic Coast Conference.)	—	7	3	0	—	—	—
1966	Jerry Claiborne	Independent	—	8	2	1	Lost 1966 Liberty Bowl to Miami Hurricanes, 7–14	—	20
1967	Jerry Claiborne	Independent	—	7	3	0	—	—	—
1968	Jerry Claiborne	Independent	—	7	4	0	Lost 1968 Liberty Bowl to Mississippi Rebels, 17–34	—	—
1969	Jerry Claiborne	Independent	—	4	5	1	—	—	—
1970	Jerry Claiborne	Independent	—	5	6	0	—	—	—
1971	Charlie Coffey	Independent	—	4	7	0	—	—	—
1972	Charlie Coffey	Independent	—	6	4	1	—	—	—
1973	Charlie Coffey	Independent	—	2	9	0	—	—	—
1974	Jimmy Sharpe	Independent	—	4	7	0	—	—	—
1975	Jimmy Sharpe	Independent	—	8	3	0	—	—	—
1976	Jimmy Sharpe	Independent	—	6	5	0	—	—	—
1977	Jimmy Sharpe	Independent	—	3	7	1	—	—	—
1978	Bill Dooley	Independent (Note: In 1978, Tech joined the Metro Conference in all sports except football.)	—	4	7	0	—	—	—
1979	Bill Dooley	Independent	—	5	6	0	—	—	—
1980	Bill Dooley	Independent	—	8	4	0	Lost 1981 Peach Bowl to Miami Hurricanes, 10–20	—	—
1981	Bill Dooley	Independent	—	7	4	0	—	—	—
1982	Bill Dooley	Independent	—	7	4	0	—	—	—
1983	Bill Dooley	Independent	—	9	2	0	—	—	—
1984	Bill Dooley	Independent	—	8	4	0	Lost 1984 Independence Bowl to Air Force Falcons, 7–23	—	—
1985	Bill Dooley	Independent	—	6	5	0	—	—	—
1986	Bill Dooley	Independent	—	9	2	1	Won 1986 Peach Bowl against NC State Wolfpack, 25–24	20	—
1987	Frank Beamer	Independent	—	2	9	0	—	—	—
1988	Frank Beamer	Independent	—	3	8	0	—	—	—
1989	Frank Beamer	Independent	—	6	4	1	—	—	—
1990	Frank Beamer	Independent	—	6	5	0	—	—	25
1991	Frank Beamer	Big East	6th	5	6	0	—	—	—
1992	Frank Beamer	Big East	7th	2	8	1	—	—	—
1993	Frank Beamer	Big East	4th	9	3		Won 1993 Independence Bowl against Indiana Hoosiers, 45–20	22	20
1994	Frank Beamer	Big East	2nd	8	4		Lost 1994 Gator Bowl to Tennessee Volunteers, 23–45	—	24
1995	Frank Beamer	Big East	1st	10	2		Won 1995 Sugar Bowl against Texas Longhorns, 28–10	10	9
1996	Frank Beamer	Big East	1st	10	2		Lost 1996 Orange Bowl to Nebraska Cornhuskers, 21–41	13	12
1997	Frank Beamer	Big East	2nd	7	5		Lost 1998 Gator Bowl to North Carolina Tar Heels, 3–42	—	—
1998	Frank Beamer	Big East	3rd	9	3		Won 1998 Music City Bowl against Alabama Crimson Tide, 38–7	23	19
1999	Frank Beamer	Big East	1st	11	1		Lost 2000 Sugar Bowl to Florida State Seminoles, 29–46	2	3
2000	Frank Beamer	Big East	2nd	11	1		Won 2001 Gator Bowl against Clemson Tigers, 41–20	6	6
2001	Frank Beamer	Big East	3rd	8	4		Lost 2002 Gator Bowl to Florida State, 17–30	18	18
2002	Frank Beamer	Big East	4th	10	4		Won 2002 San Francisco Bowl against Air Force, 20–13	18	14
2003	Frank Beamer	Big East (Note: Although Virginia Tech accepted a bid to join the ACC in June 2003, it did not take effect until the 2004 season.)	4th	8	5		Lost 2003 Insight Bowl to California Golden Bears, 49–52	—	—
2004	Frank Beamer	Atlantic Coast	1st	10	3		Lost 2005 Sugar Bowl to Auburn Tigers, 13–16	10	10
2005	Frank Beamer	Atlantic Coast	2nd	11	2		Won 2006 Gator Bowl against Louisville Cardinals, 35–24	7	7
2006	Frank Beamer	Atlantic Coast	3rd	10	3		Lost 2006 Chick-fil-A Bowl to Georgia Bulldogs, 24–31	19	18
2007	Frank Beamer	Atlantic Coast	1st	11	3		Lost 2008 Orange Bowl to Kansas Jayhawks, 21–24	9	9
2008	Frank Beamer	Atlantic Coast	1st	10	4		Won 2009 Orange Bowl against Cincinnati Bearcats, 20–7	15	14
2009	Frank Beamer	Atlantic Coast	3rd	10	3		Won 2009 Chick-fil-A Bowl against Tennessee Volunteers, 37–14	10	10
2010	Frank Beamer	Atlantic Coast	1st	11	3		Lost 2011 Orange Bowl against the Stanford Cardinal, 12–40	16	15
2011	Frank Beamer	Atlantic Coast	2nd	11	3		Lost 2012 Sugar Bowl against the Michigan Wolverines, 20–23 ^{OT}	21	17
2012	Frank Beamer	Atlantic Coast	T–6th	7	6		Won 2012 Russell Athletic Bowl against the Rutgers Scarlet Knights, 13–10 ^{OT}	—	—
2013	Frank Beamer	Atlantic Coast	T–4th	8	5		Lost 2013 Sun Bowl against the UCLA Bruins, 12–42	—	—
2014	Frank Beamer	Atlantic Coast	T–9th	7	6		Won 2014 Military Bowl against the Cincinnati Bearcats, 33–17	—	—
2015	Frank Beamer	Atlantic Coast	T–7th	7	6		Won 2015 Independence Bowl against the Tulsa Golden Hurricanes, 55–52	—	—
2016	Justin Fuente	Atlantic Coast	2nd	10	4		Won 2016 Belk Bowl against Arkansas Razorbacks, 35–24	16	16
2017	Justin Fuente	Atlantic Coast	4th	9	4		Lost 2017 Camping World Bowl against Oklahoma State Cowboys, 21–30	24	25
2018	Justin Fuente	Atlantic Coast	T–6th	6	7		Lost 2018 Military Bowl against Cincinnati Bearcats, 31–35	—	—
2019	Justin Fuente	Atlantic Coast	T–3rd	8	5		Lost 2019 Belk Bowl against Kentucky Wildcats, 30–37	—	—
2020	Justin Fuente	Atlantic Coast	T–6th	5	6		Opted out of playing in a bowl game	—	—
2021	Justin Fuente	Atlantic Coast	3rd (Coastal)	6	7		Lost 2021 Pinstripe Bowl against Maryland Terrapins, 10–54	—	—
2022	Brent Pry	Atlantic Coast	T–6th (Coastal)	3	8		—	—	—
2023	Brent Pry	Atlantic Coast	T–4th	7	6		Won 2023 Military Bowl against Tulane Green Wave, 41–20	—	—
2024	Brent Pry	Atlantic Coast	T–8th	6	7		Lost 2025 Duke's Mayo Bowl against Minnesota Golden Gophers, 10–24	—	—
2025	Brent Pry	Atlantic Coast	T–14th	3	9		—	—	—
2026	James Franklin	Atlantic Coast	T–11th	6	5		TBD	—	—
Total				774	503	46	(only includes regular season games)		
Total				14	22	—	(only includes bowl games; 36 appearances)		
Total				788	525	46	(all games)		

== See also ==
- Virginia Tech Hokies football
- Virginia Tech bowl games

== Reference sources ==
- Lazenby, Roland. Legends: A Pictorial History of Virginia Tech Football. Taylor, Full Court Press (1986) ISBN 978-0-913767-11-5
- Tandler, Rich. Hokie Games: Virginia Tech Football Game by Game 1945–2006. Game by Game Sports Media (September 15, 2007) ISBN 978-0-9723845-2-0
