= List of Virginia Tech Hokies bowl games =

The Virginia Tech Hokies football team, since its creation in 1892, has played 36 post-season bowl games in 19 different stadiums across ten states. This includes five Bowl Championship Series (BCS) game appearances and one appearance in the BCS National Championship Game. From 1993 to 2019, the Hokies were invited to a bowl game every year. Though bowl-eligible in 2020, the team's players opted out of accepting a potential invitation due to the COVID-19 pandemic. This 27-year active streak of consecutive bowl appearances was, at its conclusion, the longest streak in the nation and is the fifth longest all-time bowl appearance streak.

Dozens of National Football League draft picks have played for Virginia Tech in bowl games, including two first overall selections: Bruce Smith and Michael Vick. Smith participated in the 1984 Independence Bowl, while Vick quarterbacked the Hokies to their first national championship appearance during the 2000 Sugar Bowl, and followed that performance by leading the Hokies to the 2001 Gator Bowl, his final collegiate game. Following the game, Vick entered the 2001 NFL draft and was selected by the Atlanta Falcons.

Former head coach Frank Beamer (1987–2015) led Virginia Tech to 23 consecutive bowl games starting in 1993 and the Independence Bowl, posting a record of 11–12. Beamer earned national coach of the year honors several times from various organizations and had the most wins of any active Division I college football coach at the time of his retirement. Following Beamer's retirement in 2015, new Hokies head coach Justin Fuente continued the streak by winning the Belk Bowl in 2016, leading the team to a 10–4 season.

Virginia Tech's first post-season bowl game was in 1947, when the Hokies participated in the 1947 Sun Bowl in El Paso, Texas on New Year's Day against the Cincinnati Bearcats.

== Summary table ==
Key
#	Number of bowl games
†	Attendance record
‡	Former attendance record
W	Win
L	Loss

Repeat Opponents
Opponent	W-L Record
Cincinnati Bearcats	2–2
Tennessee Volunteers	1–1
Florida State Seminoles	0–2
Miami Hurricanes	0–2

Appearances per Bowl
Bowl game	Appearances
Gator Bowl	5
Peach Bowl*	4
Orange Bowl	4
Sugar Bowl	4
Independence Bowl	3
Military Bowl	3
Duke's Mayo Bowl***	3
Camping World Bowl**	2
Liberty Bowl	2
Sun Bowl	2
Music City Bowl	1
San Francisco Bowl	1
Insight Bowl	1
Pinstripe Bowl	1

* The 2009 Peach Bowl was known as the
Chick-fil-A Bowl.
** Prior to 2017 game, the Camping World Bowl
was known as the Russell Athletic Bowl.
*** Prior to 2020 game, the Duke's Mayo Bowl
was known as the Belk Bowl.

Individual bowl game attendance records are correct as of the end of the 2024 NCAA Division I FBS football season.
Overall bowl appearance record as of the end of the 2024 season: 14 wins, 22 losses.

#	Season	Bowl game	Result	Opponent	Head coach	Stadium	Location	Attendance
1	1946	1947 Sun Bowl	L 18–6	Cincinnati Bearcats	Jimmy Kitts	Kidd Field	El Paso, TX	10,000
2	1966	1966 Liberty Bowl	L 14–7	Miami Hurricanes	Jerry Claiborne	Memphis Memorial Stadium	Memphis, TN	39,101‡
3	1968	1968 Liberty Bowl	L 34–17	Ole Miss Rebels	Jerry Claiborne	Memphis Memorial Stadium	Memphis, TN	46,206‡
4	1980	1981 Peach Bowl	L 20–10	Miami Hurricanes	Bill Dooley	Fulton County Stadium	Atlanta, GA	45,384
5	1984	1984 Independence Bowl	L 23–7	Air Force Falcons	Bill Dooley	Independence Stadium	Shreveport, LA	41,100
6	1986	1986 Peach Bowl	W 25–24	NC State Wolfpack	Bill Dooley	Fulton County Stadium	Atlanta, GA	53,668
7	1993	1993 Independence Bowl	W 45–20	Indiana Hoosiers	Frank Beamer	Independence Stadium	Shreveport, LA	33,819
8	1994	1994 Gator Bowl	L 45–23	Tennessee Volunteers	Frank Beamer	Ben Hill Griffin Stadium	Gainesville, FL	62,200
9	1995	1995 Sugar Bowl	W 28–10	Texas Longhorns	Frank Beamer	Louisiana Superdome	New Orleans, LA	70,283
10	1996	1996 Orange Bowl	L 41–21	Nebraska Cornhuskers	Frank Beamer	Pro Player Stadium	Miami Gardens, FL	51,212
11	1997	1998 Gator Bowl	L 42–3	North Carolina Tar Heels	Frank Beamer	Alltel Stadium	Jacksonville, FL	54,116
12	1998	1998 Music City Bowl	W 38–7	Alabama Crimson Tide	Frank Beamer	Vanderbilt Stadium	Nashville, TN	41,600‡
13	1999	2000 Sugar Bowl (BCS National Championship Game)	L 46–29	Florida State Seminoles	Frank Beamer	Louisiana Superdome	New Orleans, LA	79,280
14	2000	2001 Gator Bowl	W 41–20	Clemson Tigers	Frank Beamer	Alltel Stadium	Jacksonville, FL	68,741
15	2001	2002 Gator Bowl	L 30–17	Florida State Seminoles	Frank Beamer	Alltel Stadium	Jacksonville, FL	72,202
16	2002	2002 San Francisco Bowl	W 20–13	Air Force Falcons	Frank Beamer	Pacific Bell Park	San Francisco, CA	25,966‡
17	2003	2003 Insight Bowl	L 52–49	California Golden Bears	Frank Beamer	Bank One Ballpark	Phoenix, AZ	42,364
18	2004	2005 Sugar Bowl	L 16–13	Auburn Tigers	Frank Beamer	Louisiana Superdome	New Orleans, LA	77,349
19	2005	2006 Gator Bowl	W 35–24	Louisville Cardinals	Frank Beamer	Alltel Stadium	Jacksonville, FL	63,780
20	2006	2006 Chick-fil-A Bowl	L 31–24	Georgia Bulldogs	Frank Beamer	Georgia Dome	Atlanta, GA	75,406
21	2007	2008 Orange Bowl	L 24–21	Kansas Jayhawks	Frank Beamer	Pro Player Stadium	Miami Gardens, FL	74,111
22	2008	2009 Orange Bowl	W 20–7	Cincinnati Bearcats	Frank Beamer	Pro Player Stadium	Miami Gardens, FL	57,821
23	2009	2009 Chick-fil-A Bowl	W 37–14	Tennessee Volunteers	Frank Beamer	Georgia Dome	Atlanta, GA	73,777
24	2010	2011 Orange Bowl	L 40–12	Stanford Cardinal	Frank Beamer	Sun Life Stadium	Miami Gardens, FL	65,453
25	2011	2012 Sugar Bowl	L 23–20	Michigan Wolverines	Frank Beamer	Mercedes-Benz Superdome	New Orleans, LA	64,512
26	2012	2012 Russell Athletic Bowl	W 13–10	Rutgers Scarlet Knights	Frank Beamer	Florida Citrus Bowl Stadium	Orlando, FL	48,127
27	2013	2013 Sun Bowl	L 42–12	UCLA Bruins	Frank Beamer	Sun Bowl Stadium	El Paso, TX	47,912
28	2014	2014 Military Bowl	W 33–17	Cincinnati Bearcats	Frank Beamer	Navy–Marine Corps Memorial Stadium	Annapolis, MD	34,277
29	2015	2015 Independence Bowl	W 55–52	Tulsa Golden Hurricane	Frank Beamer	Independence Stadium	Shreveport, LA	31,289
30	2016	2016 Belk Bowl	W 35–24	Arkansas Razorbacks	Justin Fuente	Bank of America Stadium	Charlotte, NC	46,902
31	2017	2017 Camping World Bowl	L 30–21	Oklahoma State Cowboys	Justin Fuente	Camping World Stadium	Orlando, FL	39,610
32	2018	2018 Military Bowl	L 35–31	Cincinnati Bearcats	Justin Fuente	Navy–Marine Corps Memorial Stadium	Annapolis, MD	32,832
33	2019	2019 Belk Bowl	L 37–30	Kentucky Wildcats	Justin Fuente	Bank of America Stadium	Charlotte, NC	44,138
34	2021	2021 Pinstripe Bowl	L 54–10	Maryland Terrapins	J. C. Price	Yankee Stadium	Bronx, NY	29,653
35	2023	2023 Military Bowl	W 41–20	Tulane Green Wave	Brent Pry	Navy–Marine Corps Memorial Stadium	Annapolis, MD	35,849
36	2024	2025 Duke's Mayo Bowl	L 24–10	Minnesota Golden Gophers	Brent Pry	Bank of America Stadium	Charlotte, NC	31,027

== Game capsules ==
=== 1947 Sun Bowl ===
1947 Sun Bowl
Virginia Tech	Cincinnati
6	18
	1	2	3	4	Total
Virginia Tech	0	0	0	6	6
Cincinnati	0	0	12	6	18
- Date: January 1, 1947
- Stadium: Kidd Field
- Location: El Paso, Texas

The first bowl game in Virginia Tech history came at the conclusion of the 1946 college football season as the Hokies earned a bid to the 1947 Sun Bowl. The Hokies, led by coach James Kitts, finished the regular season with three losses, three wins, and three ties (3–3–3). The team also recorded Virginia Tech's first win over an Associated Press Top 25 team in school history, the Washington and Lee University Generals, and the Hokies' traditional rivals, the Virginia Military Institute Keydets. Despite those victories, Tech's bid to the Sun Bowl only came about because the bowl's first and second picks had declined the bid and because an influential Tech alumnus on the selection committee had suggested Virginia Tech. Opposing the Hokies were the Cincinnati Bearcats, who had gone 8–2 during the regular season.

The game kicked off on January 1, 1947, at Kidd Field in El Paso, Texas in freezing temperatures. Defense dominated on both sides in the first half due to the weather and tough play. Neither team scored, but Virginia Tech had the best chance—driving to a first down inside the Cincinnati two-yard line in the first quarter. The Cincinnati defense held, however, and the game went into halftime scoreless.

In the second half, the favored Bearcats managed to find success on offense. Behind All-American Roger Stephens, the Bearcats tallied three touchdowns to Virginia Tech's one. The Hokies managed to block all three Cincinnati extra point kicks, but without touchdowns of their own, the Hokies had no chance to win. Cincinnati emerged victorious as time ran out, 18–6.

=== 1966 Liberty Bowl ===
1966 Liberty Bowl
Miami	Virginia Tech
14	7
	1	2	3	4	Total
Miami	0	0	7	7	14
Virginia Tech	7	0	0	0	7
- Date: December 10, 1966
- Stadium: Memphis Memorial Stadium
- Location: Memphis, Tennessee

Virginia Tech's second bowl game did not come until nearly 20 years after its first. On December 10, 1966, the Hokies faced off against the No. 9 Miami Hurricanes in the Liberty Bowl in Memphis, Tennessee. Tech came into the game having gone 8–1–1 during the regular season under head coach Jerry Claiborne, while the Hurricanes boasted a 7–2–1 regular-season record, including wins over Southern California and Florida. The Hokies were led by All-America safety Frank Loria, who caught three interceptions and returned three punts for touchdowns as a junior during the 1966 season. On the opposite side of the ball, the Hurricanes were led by All-American Ted Hendricks.

The game kicked off in frigid 36 °F (2 °C) weather, and from the beginning, defense dominated. In the first half, Tech held Miami to just 16 yards of total offense, and Miami set bowl game records for fewest rushing yards allowed and fewest first downs allowed. The Hokies got the first big break of the game after blocking Miami's first punt of the game. Taking over at the Miami 21-yard line, it took Virginia Tech just five plays to march into the end zone for an early 7–0 lead. Virginia Tech and Miami battled to a stalemate for the rest of the first half, and Tech went into halftime still clinging to a 7–0 lead.

In the second half, Tech's fortune turned. Late in the third quarter, the Virginia Tech defense stopped Miami's offense again, but instead of receiving the punt cleanly, the Hokies committed a roughing the kicker penalty that allowed Miami to retain possession of the ball with a first down. A few plays later, Miami scored its first touchdown of the game. In the fourth quarter Miami finally took the lead on a 10-play, 70-yard drive. The Hokies were unable to answer the Hurricanes' score, and Miami won the 1966 Liberty Bowl, 14–7.

=== 1968 Liberty Bowl ===
1968 Liberty Bowl
Ole Miss	Virginia Tech
34	17
	1	2	3	4	Total
Ole Miss	0	14	7	13	34
Virginia Tech	17	0	0	0	17
- Date: December 14, 1968
- Stadium: Memphis Memorial Stadium
- Location: Memphis, Tennessee

Two years after its previous trip to the Liberty Bowl, Virginia Tech was again asked to travel to Memphis, Tennessee to play in a post-season bowl game. This time, the opponent was Mississippi, which had amassed a 6–3–1 record during the regular season. The Hokies came into the game with a 7–3 record that included a loss to Tech's previous Liberty Bowl opponent, Miami.

The 1968 Liberty Bowl kicked off on January 14, 1968. As in the Hokies' previous Liberty Bowl appearance, Virginia Tech got off to a fast start. On the game's second play, Tech ran 58 yards for a touchdown, courtesy of a trick play. After Mississippi fumbled, Tech recovered and scored another quick touchdown. At the end of the first quarter, Tech added a field goal to the two touchdowns it had already earned, making the score 17–0 at the end of one quarter. From that point onward, however, almost nothing would go in Virginia Tech's favor. Tech attempted an onside kick following the field goal, but were unable to successfully recover the ball. With good field position following the kick, Mississippi quarterback Archie Manning orchestrated a 49-yard drive for the Rebels' first points of the game.

Mississippi scored another touchdown before halftime, and the Hokies clung to a 17–14 lead at the beginning of the second half. That three-point lead quickly evaporated, however, as 21 seconds into the third quarter, Mississippi's Steve Hindman ran for 79 yards and a touchdown to give Mississippi a 21–17 lead. Ole Miss added 13 more points before the game was over and earned the victory, 34–17. The Virginia Tech offense was stymied by repeated turnovers. Tech fumbled the ball three times and Tech quarterback Humphries threw two interceptions. Tech committed 120 yards in penalties and was held to just two passing yards for the entire game.

=== 1981 Peach Bowl ===
1981 Peach Bowl
Miami	Virginia Tech
20	10
	1	2	3	4	Total
Miami	7	7	3	3	20
Virginia Tech	0	3	7	0	10
- Date: January 2, 1981
- Stadium: Fulton County Stadium
- Location: Atlanta, Georgia

Following the 1980 college football season, Virginia Tech was awarded a bid to the 1981 Peach Bowl as a reward for finishing 8–3 during the regular season. Facing Virginia Tech was a familiar post-season opponent—Miami—whom the Hokies had played in the 1966 Liberty Bowl. No. 20 Miami finished the regular season with an 8–3 record.

The 1981 Peach Bowl kicked off on January 2, 1981, at Fulton County Stadium in Atlanta, Georgia. Unlike the 1966 Liberty Bowl, in which Virginia Tech scored first, it was Miami who dominated the game's early going. The Hurricanes scored a touchdown on the first drive of the game and tacked on another touchdown early in the second quarter. Tech was held scoreless in the early going, thanks to two Miami interceptions at the goal line as Virginia Tech was threatening to score. Late in the second quarter, Tech was finally able to get on the scoreboard with a field goal, but at halftime, the Miami Hurricanes led 14–3.

After halftime, the Hokies threatened Miami for the first time all game. Virginia Tech mounted an 80-yard drive that resulted in a touchdown, cutting Miami's lead to 14–10. But the Hurricanes' defense clamped down on any further offensive attempts by Virginia Tech and denied the Hokies more points. Miami added two field goals: one in the third quarter and one in the fourth quarter that finally put the game out of reach for Virginia Tech. Miami earned the win, 20–10. Miami's win was its first bowl victory since the 1966 Liberty Bowl, which also featured a Hurricanes victory over Virginia Tech.

=== 1984 Independence Bowl ===
1984 Independence Bowl
Air Force	Virginia Tech
23	7
	1	2	3	4	Total
Air Force	3	7	0	13	23
Virginia Tech	7	0	0	0	7
- Date: December 15, 1984
- Stadium: Independence Stadium
- Location: Shreveport, Louisiana

The Virginia Tech Hokies earned a bid to the 1984 Independence Bowl following an 8–3 record during the 1984–1985 football season. Facing the Hokies were the Falcons of the United States Air Force Academy, who had gone 7–4 during the regular season, including a 5–3 record in the Western Athletic Conference.

The 1984 Independence Bowl kicked off on December 15, 1984, in Shreveport, Louisiana. Weather at kickoff was a comfortable 74 °F (23 °C) and the wind was from the southwest at 14 miles per hour (23 km/h)–18 miles per hour (29 km/h). An estimated 41,100 people came out to watch the Falcons take on the Hokies. Air Force scored first with a 35-yard field goal, but the Hokies struck back with a touchdown off of a 10-play, 72-yard drive, putting Virginia Tech ahead 7–3. That score would remain until halfway through the second quarter, when Virginia Tech fumbled the ball at its own three-yard line. Air Force recovered the ball and scored a touchdown on the next play, regaining a 10–7 lead.

At halftime, Air Force still led by 10–7. Following the half, Virginia Tech's defense began to break down under Air Force's rushing offense. The Hokies and Air Force battled defensively throughout the third quarter, but in the fourth quarter, Air Force's offense broke free for 13 unanswered points. Tech's offense was stifled by two Air Force interceptions and two lost fumbles, allowing Air Force to earn the easy victory, 23–7.

=== 1986 Peach Bowl ===
1986 Peach Bowl
Virginia Tech	North Carolina State
25	24
	1	2	3	4	Total
Virginia Tech	10	0	6	9	25
North Carolina State	7	14	0	3	24
- Date: December 31, 1986
- Stadium: Atlanta–Fulton County Stadium
- Location: Atlanta, Georgia

Virginia Tech's first bowl win in school history came in a dramatic 25–24 win over the No. 18 North Carolina State Wolfpack in the 1986 Peach Bowl. Tech came into the game with a 9–1–1 record that included an unusual forfeit win over Temple. The Owls, who had played the game with an ineligible player, won the game on the field, but later forfeited the victory to Virginia Tech. Facing the Hokies in the 1986 Peach Bowl were the 18th-ranked Wolfpack from North Carolina State University. N.C. State was led by head coach Dick Sheridan and had a regular-season record of 8–2–1 that included five wins over Atlantic Coast Conference teams.

The 1986 Peach Bowl kicked off on December 31, 1986, at Fulton County Stadium in Atlanta, Georgia, five years minus one day since Virginia Tech had last played in Atlanta for the 1981 Peach Bowl. Virginia Tech scored first, but NC State's Bulluck blocked a Tech punt in the Tech end zone and recovered it for a tying touchdown. Virginia Tech kicked a field goal at the end of the quarter to take a 10–7 lead, but NC State fought back, scoring 14 unanswered points in the second quarter to take a 21–10 lead by halftime.

In the third quarter, the game turned into a defensive battle. Neither side scored until late in the third quarter, when Tech took advantage of a State fumble to score the first touchdown of the second half. Tech failed to convert a two-point conversion, but NC State fumbled again on the ensuing possession, and Tech was able to drive for another touchdown. Leading 22–21, Tech attempted another two-point conversion, which also failed.

NC State, needing to score, drove down the field and kicked a go-ahead 33-yard field goal with 7:12 remaining in the game. After a failed possession, Tech was forced to punt the ball away, allowing NC State to run down the clock. The Virginia Tech defense eventually forced a stop, giving the Tech offense one final chance to win the game. With 1:53 on the clock and beginning from their own 20-yard line, the Hokies drove 57 yards to the NC State 23-yard line. There, kicker Chris Kinzer successfully kicked a 40-yard field goal as time expired to give Virginia Tech a 25–24 win.

=== 1993 Independence Bowl ===
1993 Independence Bowl
Indiana	Virginia Tech
20	45
	1	2	3	4	Total
Indiana	7	6	0	7	20
Virginia Tech	7	21	0	17	45
- Date: December 31, 1993
- Stadium: Independence Stadium
- Location: Shreveport, Louisiana

The No. 22 Virginia Tech Hokies came into the 1993 Independence Bowl with an 8–3 regular-season record that included wins over Pittsburgh and Virginia. The bowl appearance was the first for head coach Frank Beamer, who had turned the team around after a 2–8–1 season the previous year. Facing the Hokies were the No. 21 Indiana Hoosiers, who were playing in their first bowl game since the 1991 Copper Bowl.

The 1993 Independence Bowl kicked off on December 31, 1993, in Shreveport, Louisiana. Indiana jumped out to an early lead courtesy of a 75-yard pass from quarterback John Paci. Virginia Tech equalized the score before the first quarter ran out, then took a 14–7 lead with a second-quarter touchdown run by fullback Joe Swarm. Indiana climbed back with two field goals that cut Tech's lead to 14–13. With Indiana in possession of the ball and time running down, it appeared that Indiana would have at least one more attempt on offense before halftime. Before the Indiana drive could get moving, John Paci fumbled the ball, which was recovered by Virginia Tech and returned 20 yards for a touchdown. On Virginia Tech's post-touchdown kickoff, Indiana returned the ball deep into Virginia Tech territory, setting up a potential field goal by kicker Bill Manolopoulos. During the kick, Virginia Tech defender Jeff Holland broke through the Indiana offensive line and blocked the field goal attempt. Tech's Antonio Banks scooped up the ball and ran 80 yards for another touchdown—Virginia Tech's second in less than 40 seconds.

The two touchdowns gave Virginia Tech a 28–13 halftime lead, and Indiana never seriously challenged the Hokies afterward. Both teams failed to score in the third quarter, but Virginia Tech added 17 points in the fourth quarter to make the game a blowout. Indiana managed a touchdown toward the end of the game, but the result had already been decided. Virginia Tech won the 1993 Independence Bowl, 45–20.

=== 1994 Gator Bowl ===
1994 Gator Bowl
Virginia Tech	Tennessee
23	45
	1	2	3	4	Total
Virginia Tech	0	10	6	7	23
Tennessee	14	21	0	10	45
- Date: December 30, 1994
- Stadium: Ben Hill Griffin Stadium
- Location: Gainesville, Florida

The 1994 Gator Bowl saw 17th-ranked Virginia Tech face off against regional rival Tennessee at Ben Hill Griffin Stadium on the campus of the University of Florida. Tech came into the game with an 8–3 regular-season record that included a record of 5–2 in Big East Conference competition. The Tennessee Volunteers came entered the game with a regular-season record of 7–4 under head coach Phillip Fulmer that included a 5–3 record in Southeastern Conference competition.

The game kicked off On December 30, 1994, in Gainesville, Florida. From the start, Tennessee's high-scoring offense dominated. The Volunteers scored two touchdowns in the first quarter and three in the second, while Virginia Tech was able to muster a lone touchdown and field goal in the second quarter. At halftime, Tennessee had a commanding 35–10 lead.

The Hokies struggled back in the third quarter, scoring six unanswered points to close the score to 35–16. In the fourth quarter, however, Tennessee answered Virginia Tech's effort with 10 points, putting the game out of reach for the Hokies, who managed only a single touchdown in the fourth quarter. The Hokies fumbled the ball five times—losing it once—and threw two interceptions, allowing Tennessee to cruise to an easy victory, 45–23. Tennessee running back James Stewart was named the game's most valuable player.

=== 1995 Sugar Bowl ===
1995 Sugar Bowl
Virginia Tech	Texas
28	10
	1	2	3	4	Total
Virginia Tech	0	7	7	14	28
Texas	7	3	0	0	10
- Date: December 31, 1995
- Stadium: Louisiana Superdome
- Location: New Orleans, Louisiana

In 1995, Virginia Tech received its first bid to a Bowl Coalition game. The Bowl Coalition, predecessor to the modern Bowl Championship Series, was intended to match up the two best teams in the Sugar, Orange, Fiesta, and Rose Bowls, with the two highest-ranked teams playing in a National Championship Game. Following the 1995–1996 college football season, Virginia Tech was selected to play in the 1995 Sugar Bowl as a result of this coalition. The No. 13 Hokies, who finished 9–2 during the regular season and were named Big East Conference champions, played against the No. 9 University of Texas, who finished 10–1–1 during the regular season en route to becoming Southwest Conference champions.

The 1995 Sugar Bowl kicked off on December 31, 1995, in the Louisiana Superdome in New Orleans, Louisiana. Defense dominated in the first quarter as neither team scored during the game's first four possessions. Late in the quarter, however, Texas' offense, led by quarterback James Brown, put together an eight-play, 72-yard drive that ended with a four-yard touchdown pass. At the end of the first quarter, Texas led 7–0. Early in the second quarter, Texas added another three points with a 52-yard field goal that came off of an interception. But the Hokies began to fight back. Brian Still returned a Texas punt 60 yards for Tech's first points of the game, and at halftime, the Longhorns' lead was cut to just three points.

In the second half, Virginia Tech's defense kicked into high gear. Cornell Brown, the Hokies' All-American defensive end, was a key player as Tech sacked the Texas quarterback five times and caught three pass interceptions. On offense, wide receiver Brian Still added two passing touchdowns to his punt return touchdown, and the Hokies scored 21 unanswered points in the second half. Tech won the game, 28–10. The win was the third bowl victory in school history, and was by far the highest-profile win for the school at the time.

=== 1996 Orange Bowl ===
1996 Orange Bowl
Virginia Tech	Nebraska
21	41
	1	2	3	4	Total
Virginia Tech	7	7	7	0	21
Nebraska	0	17	14	10	41
- Date: December 31, 1996
- Stadium: Pro Player Stadium
- Location: Miami Gardens, Florida

A year after earning a bid to its first Bowl Coalition game, Tech again earned the honor of participating in an upper-tier bowl game. Under the newly renamed Bowl Alliance, Virginia Tech was selected to play in the 1996 Orange Bowl. The No. 10 Hokies finished 10–1 in the regular season, en route to their second consecutive Big East Conference championship. Facing the Hokies were the No. 6 Nebraska Cornhuskers, who had finished 10–2 during the 1996–1997 season, including a loss to Texas in the Big 12 Conference championship game.

The 1996 Orange Bowl kicked off on December 31, 1996, exactly one year after the Hokies' previous bowl game. Instead of New Orleans, however, the Hokies were playing in stormy Miami, Florida at Pro Player Stadium. Neither team scored until late in the first quarter when Tech quarterback Jim Druckenmiller put Virginia Tech on the board with a 19-yard touchdown pass. The Hokies' 7–0 lead at the end of the first quarter didn't last long, however. Nebraska scored a field goal early in the second quarter and tacked on a touchdown to take a 10–7 lead halfway through the second quarter. Then Nebraska got its biggest play of the game as Tech's Druckenmiller fumbled the ball. A Nebraska player scooped up the ball, returning it 31 yards for a touchdown. Tech was able to score a touchdown before halftime, but Nebraska still held a 17–14 lead as the second half began.

Nebraska widened its lead with a 33-yard touchdown run six minutes into the second half, but Tech answered right back with a 33-yard touchdown pass on its subsequent possession. The score cut Nebraska's lead to 24–21. Unfortunately for the Hokies, that score was the closest they would get to a lead as Nebraska's offense began to wear down the Tech defense. Nebraska scored another touchdown in the fourth quarter, then racked up 10 points in the fourth quarter to secure the victory. Nebraska won, 41–21.

=== 1998 Gator Bowl ===
1998 Gator Bowl
Virginia Tech	North Carolina
3	42
	1	2	3	4	Total
Virginia Tech	0	0	3	0	3
North Carolina	16	6	6	14	42
- Date: January 1, 1998
- Stadium: Alltel Stadium
- Location: Jacksonville, FL

Following the 1997 college football season, Virginia Tech was selected to play in the 1998 Gator Bowl as a reward for a 7–4 regular season. Facing the unranked Hokies were the No. 7-ranked North Carolina Tar Heels. The Heels had gone 10–1 during the regular season and were ranked seventh in the Associated Press poll heading into the game. North Carolina was playing under new head coach Carl Torbush for the first time. Torbush had taken over for former head coach Mack Brown on December 8 after Brown announced that he was departing to take the position of head coach at Texas.

The game kicked off on January 1, 1998, at Alltel Stadium in Jacksonville, Florida. From the opening kickoff, North Carolina dominated every aspect of the game. In the first quarter, the Tar Heels scored 16 points, matching the total number of first-quarter points they had scored in every game of the regular season combined. North Carolina added six points in the second and third quarters before Tech scored its first points of the game—a 40-yard field goal by kicker Shayne Graham. North Carolina set records for largest bowl game margin of victory, most points scored in a bowl game, and most touchdown passes in a bowl game.

The eventual 42–3 loss was Virginia Tech's largest bowl loss in school history.

=== 1998 Music City Bowl ===
1998 Music City Bowl
Virginia Tech	Alabama
38	7
	1	2	3	4	Total
Virginia Tech	7	3	14	14	38
Alabama	0	7	0	0	7
- Date: December 29, 1998
- Stadium: Vanderbilt Stadium
- Location: Nashville, Tennessee

Virginia Tech's 8–3 record during the 1998 college football regular season was good enough to earn it a bid to the inaugural Music City Bowl game. Facing the Hokies were the Alabama Crimson Tide, who had gone 7–4 during the regular season.

The 1998 Music City Bowl kicked off on December 29, 1998, in Nashville, Tennessee. The weather at kickoff was "horrid", as rain and sleet mixed in freezing temperatures. The game's early going was marked by defense as both teams struggled against the inclement weather. Virginia Tech scored first off of a 43-yard touchdown scramble by quarterback Al Clark. Clark's touchdown provided the game's only points until the second quarter, when Alabama evened the score at 7–7 with a five-yard touchdown pass. The Hokies struck back with a field goal before halftime and took a tenuous 10–7 lead into the second half.

In that half, the Tech offense finally got rolling. The Hokies scored 14 points in both the third and fourth quarters, ending the game on an uncontested 28–0 run. Alabama's offense was stifled throughout by effective pressure from Tech defensive end Corey Moore, and Tech was able to turn several fumbles and interceptions by the Crimson Tide into points on the scoreboard. The final 38–7 Virginia Tech victory was the biggest win in Virginia Tech bowl game history.

=== 2000 Sugar Bowl ===
2000 Sugar Bowl
Florida State	Virginia Tech
46	29
	1	2	3	4	Total
Florida State	14	14	0	18	46
Virginia Tech	7	7	15	0	29
- Date: January 4, 2000
- Stadium: Louisiana Superdome
- Location: New Orleans, Louisiana

In their first trip to a bowl sponsored by the newly formed Bowl Championship Series—which had replaced the Bowl Alliance—the No. 2 Hokies returned to New Orleans to face Bobby Bowden's No. 1 1999 Florida State Seminoles football team for the national championship. The Seminoles had narrowly lost the 1999 BCS National Championship Game to the Tennessee Volunteers and were looking to polish off an undefeated season by beating Virginia Tech.

The Hokies' offense starred redshirt freshman quarterback Michael Vick, who finished the season as the third-place runner-up for the Heisman Trophy. Vick's Hokies, who had been favored in every game that year, entered the game as 5.5-point underdogs.

The game kicked off on January 4, 2000, in the Louisiana Superdome in New Orleans, Louisiana. Florida State jumped out to a quick 28–7 lead in the first two quarters of play, but the Hokies closed the lead to a 28–14 margin by halftime with a 3-yard run from Vick. In the second half, Tech made its biggest run of the game as Kicker Shayne Graham kicked a field goal and tailback Andre Kendrick added two rushing touchdowns to give the Hokies their first and only lead—29–28—with just over three minutes left in the third quarter. But in the end, the Hokies could not contain Florida State quarterback Chris Weinke, who threw two touchdowns in the fourth quarter and 329 yards in the game. The Seminoles defeated Virginia Tech 46–29.

=== 2001 Gator Bowl ===
2001 Gator Bowl
Clemson	Virginia Tech
20	41
	1	2	3	4	Total
Clemson	0	10	3	7	20
Virginia Tech	14	7	13	7	41
- Date: January 1, 2001
- Stadium: Alltel Stadium
- Location: Jacksonville, Florida

After the Hokies' participation in the 2000 BCS National Championship Game, the Virginia Tech entered the 2000–2001 college football season with high expectations. Until late in the season, those hopes were borne out, and it appeared as if the Hokies would return to the national championship game. After a late-season loss to No. 3-ranked Miami, however, Tech was knocked out of contention for the national title. Following the conclusion of its 10–1 season, No. 6 Tech was selected to participate in the Gator Bowl. Facing the Hokies were the No. 16 Clemson Tigers, who had finished 9–2 during the regular season.

The 2001 Gator Bowl kicked off on January 1, 2001, at Alltel Stadium in Jacksonville, Florida. Early on, Virginia Tech took advantage of Clemson mistakes to build a first-quarter lead. On the game's first possession, the Tech defense forced a Clemson punt. Clemson mishandled the kick, and Tech was able to recover the ball at the Clemson 23-yard line. One play later, Tech was on the board with a touchdown pass from quarterback Michael Vick. By the end of the first quarter, Tech had taken a 14–0 lead. Clemson was able to close the gap to 14–10 in the second quarter, but Tech added another touchdown before halftime to take a 21–10 lead into the second half.

In that half, Tech pulled steadily away from the Tigers. Virginia Tech scored 13 points in the third quarter and seven in the fourth quarter, and Clemson never seriously challenged the Hokies, who went on to record a 41–20 victory. The game was the final collegiate contest for Tech quarterback Michael Vick, who would go on to be selected as the first overall pick in the 2001 NFL draft.

=== 2002 Gator Bowl ===
2002 Gator Bowl
Florida State	Virginia Tech
30	17
	1	2	3	4	Total
Florida State	0	10	3	17	30
Virginia Tech	3	0	14	0	17
- Date: January 1, 2002
- Stadium: Alltel Stadium
- Location: Jacksonville, Florida

No. 15 Virginia Tech was selected to play in the 2002 Gator Bowl with an 8–3 regular-season record despite having just played in Jacksonville at the end of the previous year. The selection of Virginia Tech over the Syracuse Orangemen (now just the "Orange") despite losing head-to-head and Syracuse having better conference and overall records was controversial. No. 24 Florida State, who had failed to win at least a share of the Atlantic Coast Conference title for the first time since joining the league in 1992, and who had played in all three BCS National Championship games held to that point, was selected as the opponent.

The 2002 Gator Bowl kicked off on January 1, 2002, at Alltel Stadium in Jacksonville, Florida, exactly one year since the Hokies had last played in the game. The game's early going seemed promising for the defense-minded Hokies. In the first quarter, Tech held Florida State scoreless despite only managing a single field goal on offense. In the third quarter, however, Florida State began to find gaps in the Hokie defense and scored 10 points. At halftime, Florida State held a 10–3 lead.

In the third quarter, Tech struck back. The Hokies scored 14 points in the quarter, while Florida State managed just a field goal. The Hokies' All-American tailback Lee Suggs had suffered a season-ending injury in the first game of the season, but freshman Kevin Jones had carried the offense for the season, and continued to perform well in the post-season Gator Bowl game. With a 5-yard run from Jones and a 55-yard pass from Grant Noel to André Davis, Tech took a 17–13 lead going into the fourth quarter. But the lead quickly evaporated on a 77-yard catch and run from Chris Rix to Javon Walker.

Florida State added ten more points after the long touchdown pass, and the Seminoles went on to win the game, 30–17.

=== 2002 San Francisco Bowl ===
2002 San Francisco Bowl
Air Force	Virginia Tech
13	20
	1	2	3	4	Total
Air Force	10	0	0	3	13
Virginia Tech	7	3	7	3	20
- Date: December 31, 2002
- Stadium: Pacific Bell Park
- Location: San Francisco, California

No. 21 Virginia Tech was selected for the inaugural edition of the San Francisco Bowl after a 9–4 record during the 2002 college football season. Facing the Hokies were the Air Force Academy Falcons, who received their bid following an 8–4 regular season.

The 2002 San Francisco Bowl kicked off on December 31, 2002, at Pacific Bell Park in San Francisco, California. The weather was clear and unseasonably warm for San Francisco in late December, but the field was soggy after several days of rain. In the first seven minutes of the game, Air Force scored 10 consecutive points to take an early 10–0 lead. The Tech defense eventually clamped down on the Falcons' offense, however, and only allowed three points for the remainder of the game. The Virginia Tech offense slowly climbed back from the initial 10-point deficit, scoring a touchdown in the first quarter and a field goal in the second. By halftime, the Hokies had equalized the score at 10–10.

In the second half, defense continued to dominate as Tech built a lead. The Hokies scored the only points of a third quarter as running back Lee Suggs ran into the end zone from one yard out, allowing Tech to take a 17–10 lead into the fourth quarter. The Falcons didn't give up easily, however. Air Force kicker Joey Ashcroft cut into the Tech lead with a 21-yard field goal. Tech matched the score later in the quarter to restore the one-touchdown lead. As time ran down, Air Force had one final chance to tie the game and send it into overtime. Beginning at its own 18-yard line with 4:11 left to play, the Falcons drove deep into Tech territory. With seven seconds remaining, Air Force quarterback Chance Harridge tried to scramble into the end zone, but was stopped before the goal line by Tech cornerback Ronyell Whitaker. The defensive stop preserved the 20–13 Hokie victory, and Tech quarterback Bryan Randall was named the game's most valuable player.

=== 2003 Insight Bowl ===
2003 Insight Bowl
California	Virginia Tech
52	49
	1	2	3	4	Total
California	7	14	21	10	52
Virginia Tech	21	7	0	21	49
- Date: December 26, 2003
- Stadium: Bank One Ballpark
- Location: Phoenix, Arizona

During the latter half of the 2003 college football season, Virginia Tech struggled. Following an 8–4 regular season, that saw the Hokies lose four of its last six regular-season games, Tech accepted a bid to the 2003 Insight Bowl. Facing the Hokies were the California Golden Bears, who had gone 7–6 during the regular season, tying for third place in the Pacific-10 Conference.

The 2003 Insight Bowl kicked off on December 26, 2003, at Bank One Ballpark in Phoenix, Arizona. From the beginning, it was a quick-paced, high-scoring game. In the first quarter, Virginia Tech jumped out to a 21–7 lead courtesy of the Tech passing game, which saw quarterback Bryan Randall eventually throw four touchdowns. In the second quarter, California partially recovered from its 14-point first-quarter deficit by scoring two touchdowns. Tech, meanwhile, scored another, and took a 28–21 lead into halftime.

The offensive onslaught continued in the second half, though it was California that took the advantage at first. Bolstered by an improved defensive effort that held the Hokies scoreless throughout the third quarter, California, behind quarterback Aaron Rodgers, scored 21 unanswered points to take a 42–28 lead into the fourth quarter. But in that quarter, the Hokies clawed back into competition. Tech scored a touchdown to begin the quarter, but Cal answered right back with one of its own, making the score 49–35. The Hokies then evened the score at 49–49 after an 80-yard drive that took less than two minutes and a punt return by DeAngelo Hall for a touchdown. With time running out, Cal still had a chance to drive for a game-winning score. The post-score Tech kickoff went out of bounds, giving the Bears possession at their 35-yard line. Cal needed just seven plays to march 47 yards to set up the game-winning field goal. As time expired, kicker Tyler Frederickson kicked a 35-yard field goal try to give California the 52–49 win.

=== 2005 Sugar Bowl ===

vs.

2005 Sugar Bowl
Virginia Tech	Auburn
13	16
	1	2	3	4	Total
Virginia Tech	0	0	0	13	13
Auburn	6	3	7	0	16
- Date: January 3, 2005
- Stadium: Louisiana Superdome
- Location: New Orleans, Louisiana

A decade after Virginia Tech's selection the 1995 Sugar Bowl and five years after its appearance in a Sugar Bowl game that served as the national championship game, Tech was again selected to play in New Orleans' annual Sugar Bowl game. The No. 9 Hokies finished the regular season 10–2 and won the Atlantic Coast Conference championship their first year in the conference, winning an automatic bid to the game. Facing the Hokies were the No. 3 Auburn Tigers, who had gone 12–0 during the regular season. Normally, Auburn's undefeated season would have been justification for a spot in the 2005 BCS National Championship Game, but because two other teams had also gone undefeated during the regular season, Auburn, as the No. 3 team in the country, was left out of the National Championship game.

The 2005 Sugar Bowl kicked off at the Louisiana Superdome in New Orleans, Louisiana on January 3, 2005. The game's early going was marked by defense and field goals. Virginia Tech didn't score in the first half, and Auburn managed just three field goals, including one taken inside the Virginia Tech red zone after Auburn failed to score a touchdown from the Tech one-yard line. Tech also had a chance to score a touchdown from inside their opponent's one-yard line, but like Auburn, failed to do so. The Hokies elected to try for a touchdown rather than a field goal on fourth down, but were stopped. At halftime, Auburn had a 9–0 lead.

In the second half, both teams had more offensive success. Auburn scored the game's first touchdown four and a half minutes into the third quarter, widening the Tigers' lead to 16–0. Virginia Tech fought back, driving inside the Auburn 10-yard line before settling for a field goal attempt. Kicker Brandon Pace missed the 23-yard field goal try, leaving the score at 16–0. Tech would have other chances, however. With less than seven minutes remaining in the game, Tech scored its first points of the game after a six-play, 78-yard drive. A 29-yard touchdown pass from quarterback Bryan Randall made the score 16–6 after a missed two-point conversion. As time ran down, Tech closed the gap even further. With just over two minutes remaining in the game, Randall connected on an 80-yard pass to wide receiver Josh Morgan for a touchdown. With the score now at 16–13 and time running out, Tech elected to attempt an onside kick in hopes of having a chance for a game-winning offensive drive. Auburn recovered the kick, however, and ran out the clock.

Auburn won the game, 16–13, and Auburn quarterback Jason Campbell was named the game's most valuable player.

=== 2006 Gator Bowl ===

vs.

2006 Gator Bowl
Virginia Tech	Louisville
35	24
	1	2	3	4	Total
Virginia Tech	3	7	3	22	35
Louisville	14	3	0	7	24
- Date: January 2, 2006
- Stadium: Alltel Stadium
- Location: Jacksonville, Florida

Virginia Tech was selected as a participant in the 2006 Gator Bowl following a 10–2 regular season that included wins over 15th-ranked Georgia Tech and traditional rivals Virginia. A loss to Florida State in the inaugural ACC Championship Game had given Tech a bid to the Gator Bowl instead of the more prestigious Bowl Championship Series-run Orange Bowl game. Facing the 12th-ranked Hokies were the 15th-ranked Louisville Cardinals, who had gone 9–2 during their first season in the Big East Conference. Louisville had won its last five games before the Gator Bowl and had participated in the Liberty Bowl during the previous season.

The 2006 Gator Bowl was played on January 2, 2006, at 12:30 p.m. EST in Jacksonville, Florida. Louisville led for much of the game, beginning with an 11-yard touchdown pass in the first quarter by quarterback Hunter Cantwell. Tech was only able to answer with a field goal while Louisville was able to add another touchdown before the end of the quarter. In the second quarter, Virginia Tech fought back and narrowed Louisville's lead to a single touchdown. At halftime, the score was 17–10 in Louisville's favor.

In the second half, Virginia Tech's offense began to have success. Tech earned the only points of the third quarter—a 28-yard field goal from kicker Brandon Pace—to narrow Louisville's lead to 17–13. In the fourth quarter, however, the game fully turned in the Hokies' favor. Though Louisville scored a touchdown early in the quarter, the Hokies' scored 22 unanswered points in the final 13 minutes of the game to take a 35–24 lead and earn the win.

The Hokie win was marred by excessive penalties and unsportsmanlike conduct that resulted in the ejection of one player. Following the game, Virginia Tech quarterback Marcus Vick was released from the team as a result of several incidents of misconduct, including a stomp on Louisville defender Elvis Dumervil's leg during the game.

=== 2006 Chick-fil-A Bowl ===

vs.

2006 Chick-fil-A Bowl
Georgia Bulldogs football	Virginia Tech
31	24
	1	2	3	4	Total
Georgia Bulldogs football	3	0	10	18	31
Virginia Tech	0	21	0	3	24
- Date: December 30, 2006
- Stadium: Georgia Dome
- Location: Atlanta, Georgia

No. 14 Virginia Tech was invited to the 2006 Chick-fil-A Bowl after a 10–2 record during the regular season, being pitted against the Georgia Bulldogs, a tough Southeastern Conference team that finished 8–4 during the regular season. Thanks to their better record, various casinos and betting organizations favored Virginia Tech by 2.5–3 points when setting their point spread.

The Hokies lived up to their favored status in the first half, running up a 21–3 lead before halftime, thanks in part to a well-executed pass by wide receiver Eddie Royal on a trick play. Royal also performed well during punt and kick returns, putting Virginia Tech in good field position throughout the half.

During the second half, however, things began to fall apart for Virginia Tech. Hokie quarterback Sean Glennon threw three interceptions and fumbled the ball once, giving Georgia excellent field position and many chances to score. Tech clung to a 21–13 lead at the end of the third quarter, but halfway through the fourth quarter, Georgia took a 31–21 lead over Virginia Tech. The Hokies closed the gap to 31–24 with a late field goal, but Georgia's defense held and the Bulldogs clinched the victory.

=== 2008 Orange Bowl ===
2008 Orange Bowl
Kansas	Virginia Tech
24	21
	1	2	3	4	Total
Kansas	7	10	0	7	24
Virginia Tech	0	7	7	7	21
- Date: January 3, 2008
- Stadium: Dolphin Stadium
- Location: Miami Gardens, Florida

No. 5 Virginia Tech entered the Bowl Championship Series (BCS) 2008 Orange Bowl following a successful 11–2 season that culminated with a 30–16 win over Boston College in the 2007 ACC Championship Game. The game, which was played on January 3, 2008, also featured the No. 8 Kansas Jayhawks, who had finished 11–1 during the regular season and had been selected via an at-large bid to play in the Orange Bowl. Various betting organizations favored Virginia Tech to win the game by 3½ points.

From the beginning of the game, the Hokies struggled on offense and were held scoreless until well into the second quarter. Kansas, however, was able to get on the board several times, jumping to a 17–0 lead before Virginia Tech scored its first points. Kansas's broke the game open in the first quarter after All-American cornerback Aqib Talib intercepted a pass by backup Virginia Tech quarterback Tyrod Taylor and returned the ball 60 yards for the game's opening points.

Early in the second half, Virginia Tech regained much of the game's momentum after wide receiver Justin Harper returned a Kansas punt 84 yards for a touchdown, pulling the Hokies within three points. Tech stopped Kansas's offense on the subsequent possession and drove down the field, seemingly for the tying score. Kansas defender Joe Mortensen rushed through the Virginia Tech line and blocked the kick, denying the Hokies three points and preserving a 17–14 Kansas lead. The two teams traded touchdowns during the fourth quarter, but Virginia Tech was unable to get the go-ahead score it needed. Kansas earned the victory, 24–21, in one of the highest-rated bowl games of the 2007–2008 bowl season.

=== 2009 Orange Bowl ===
2009 Orange Bowl
Cincinnati	Virginia Tech
7	20
	1	2	3	4	Total
Cincinnati	7	0	0	0	7
Virginia Tech	0	10	3	7	20
- Date: January 1, 2009
- Stadium: Dolphin Stadium
- Location: Miami Gardens, Florida

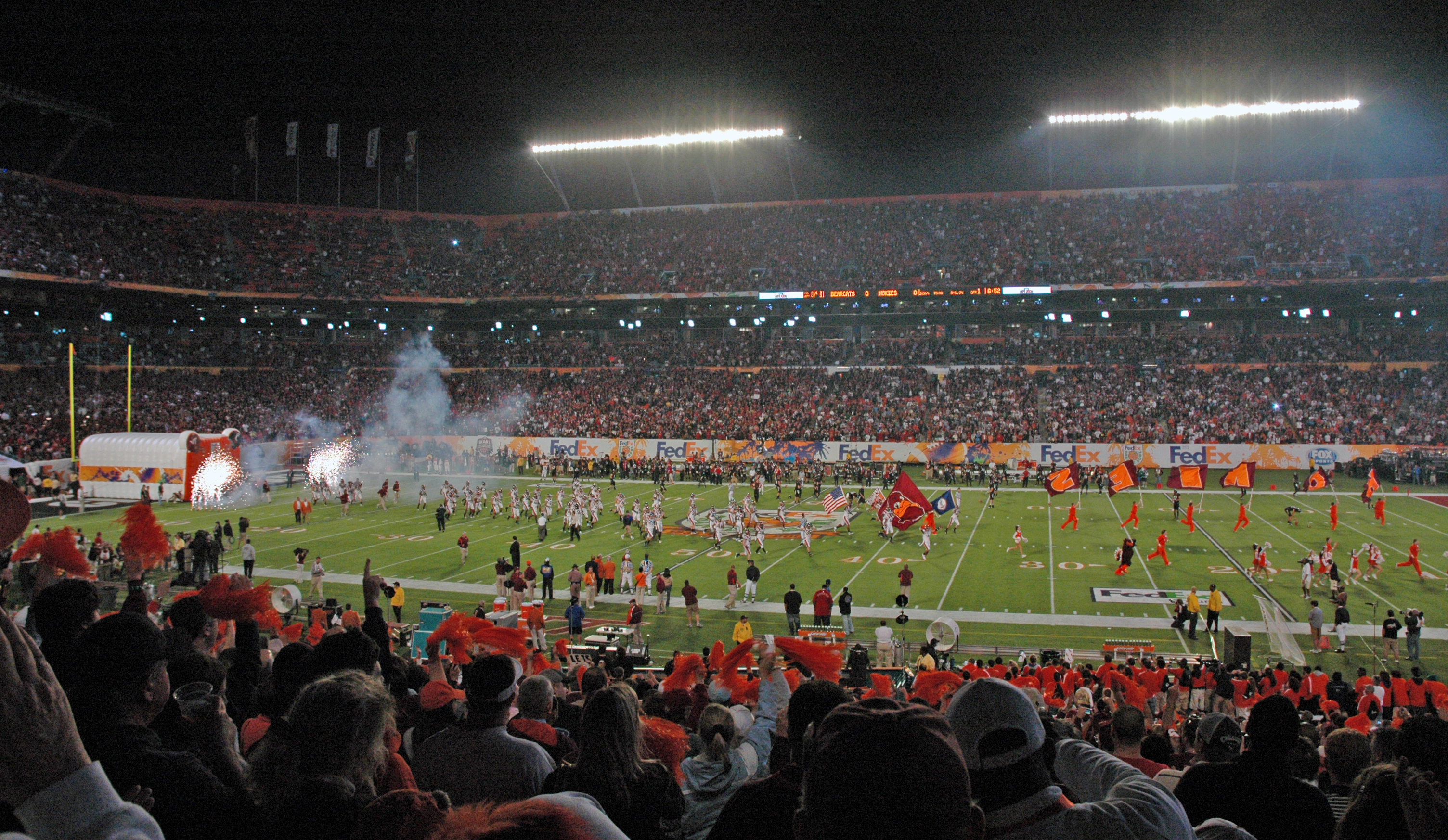
The Virginia Tech Hokies football team takes the field before the start of the 2009 Orange Bowl.

No. 19 Virginia Tech earned a bid to the 2009 Orange Bowl via an automatic bid, courtesy of a 30–12 victory against Boston College in the 2008 ACC Championship Game that saw the Hokies named champions of the Atlantic Coast Conference. The game was played on January 1, 2009, and also featured the No. 12 Cincinnati Bearcats, champions of the Big East Conference. Pregame media coverage of the game focused on the fact that the 2009 Orange Bowl was Cincinnati's first Bowl Championship Series game in school history, and despite their bowl-game inexperience, the Bearcats were favored to win by two and a half points on the eve of the game.

Cincinnati gained a 7–0 lead in the first quarter, but Virginia Tech scored 10 unanswered points to take a 10–7 lead into halftime. In the second half, Virginia Tech extended its lead as its defense kept the Bearcats scoreless. A Tech field goal in the third quarter was followed by a touchdown in the fourth quarter, and the game ended with Virginia Tech on top, 20–7.

In recognition of his performance during the game, Virginia Tech running back Darren Evans was named the game's most valuable player. Evans set a Virginia Tech bowl-game record for carries, and tied the Tech record for rushing yards. Evans finished the season with 1,265 rushing yards and 11 touchdowns–both marks were Virginia Tech records for a freshman.

=== 2010 Chick-Fil-A Bowl ===
2010 Chick-Fil-A Bowl
Virginia Tech	Tennessee
37	14
	1	2	3	4	Total
Virginia Tech	7	10	7	13	37
Tennessee	0	14	0	0	14
- Date: December 31, 2009
- Stadium: Georgia Dome
- Location: Atlanta, Georgia

The Virginia Tech Hokies (10–3), led by redshirt freshman running back Ryan Williams and Junior Quarterback Tyrod Taylor, met in Atlanta with the Tennessee Volunteers (7–6) at the Georgia Dome to end their season right where it had begun against Alabama, who would win the National Championship a week later. Williams, who had only moved to number 1 on the depth charts when Darren Evans was injured in the offseason, was looking for 109 yards rushing to pass Kevin Jones' school-record of 1,647 set in 2003.

In the first quarter, Rashad Carmichael intercepted a pass by Jonathan Crompton leading to a Williams third-down run from the 1 to give the Hokies a 7–0 lead. Williams scored again, this time from the 3, to push the lead to 14–0 in the second quarter. Tennessee then took the momentum. Montario Hardesty ran through 301-pound defensive tackle Cordarrow Thompson's tackle for a 4-yard run to cap an 80-yard drive. Janzen Jackson's interception set up Crompton's 2-yard touchdown pass to Moore with 18 seconds remaining in the first half. Instead of running out the clock, Taylor threw from his 33 to Jarrett Boykin, who was stopped inside the Volunteers' 5 as the clock apparently expired. Tennessee players left the field but were summoned back and reluctantly returned as a video review showed that Boykin's knee hit the ground with 2 seconds remaining. Matt Waldron kicked a 21-yard field goal as the first half ran out to give Virginia Tech a 17–14 halftime lead.

Tyrod Taylor scored in the third quarter with 8:32 remaining from the 1 for a 24–14 lead one play after Williams broke Jones record with the seventh carry of the drive. Waldron added a 46-yarder—the longest of his career—to push the lead to 27–14 early in the fourth quarter. Tennessee had a chance to get back into the game, but wide-open Denarius Moore dropped a deep pass from Crompton on the Volunteers' next drive. Williams sat out the fourth quarter after an apparent left ankle injury. Virginia Tech fans cheered when Williams left the trainer's table and ran on the sideline, but Beamer gave the fourth-quarter carries to Josh Oglesby and David Wilson. Wilson had a 3-yard touchdown run with 5:14 remaining extending the lead to 34–14. Crompton fumbled when sacked by Nekos Brown late in the fourth quarter which John Graves recovered at the Tennessee 13 to set up Matt Waldron's third field goal, a 22-yarder putting the game out of reach with 2:38 remaining. As the clock expired, Virginia Tech players dumped a cooler of water on coach Frank Beamer as the Virginia Tech fans in the sellout crowd of 73,777 cheered.

Ryan Williams capped a brilliant first season with a record-setting game, running for two touchdowns and 117 yards to become Virginia Tech's single-season rushing leader with 1,655 yards. Williams had long runs of 21 and 32 yards in the drive before setting the record on a 6-yard run to the 3. Williams also set Atlantic Coast Conference records with 21 rushing touchdowns and 22 total touchdowns this season breaking North Carolina's Don McCauley ACC marks of 19 rushing touchdowns and 21 total in 1970. Tennessee's star running back, Montario Hardesty, could not keep up with Williams as the Volunteers' senior had 18 carries for 39 yards and a touchdown. The Hokies outrushed Tennessee 229–5. Taylor completed 10 of 17 passes for 201 yards with an interception. Crompton completed 15 of 26 passes for 235 yards with a touchdown and an interception.

The Hokies, who won the Orange Bowl the previous season, have back-to-back bowl wins for the first time in school history and continued the streak of 10-win seasons to six. The only team with a longer active streak is Texas with nine.

=== 2011 Orange Bowl ===
2011 Orange Bowl
Virginia Tech	Stanford
12	40
	1	2	3	4	Total
Virginia Tech	2	10	0	0	12
Stanford	7	6	13	14	40
- Date: January 3, 2011
- Stadium: Sun Life Stadium
- Location: Miami Gardens, Florida

Virginia Tech was selected to participate in the 2011 Orange Bowl after an 11–2 regular season that culminated with a 44–33 win in the 2010 ACC Championship Game, clinching the Atlantic Coast Conference championship and an automatic BCS bid. Stanford was picked as the other half of the matchup following an 11–1 campaign that included the school's best-ever regular-season record. That performance earned the Cardinal a No. 4 ranking in the BCS Poll and the automatic bid to a BCS game that accompanies that status. In the weeks before the game, media attention focused on both teams' turnarounds from historical difficulties and the performance of Stanford quarterback Andrew Luck.

The game kicked off at 8:39 p.m. in warm weather, and Stanford scored first, a touchdown, with its third offensive possession. Virginia Tech briefly took the lead with a defensive score and a touchdown of its own, but Stanford restored a 13–12 advantage before halftime. In the second half, Stanford pulled away from Virginia Tech as it scored 13 points in the third quarter and 14 in the fourth while holding the Hokies scoreless.

In recognition of his performance during the game, Stanford quarterback Andrew Luck was named the game's most valuable player. He set a Stanford bowl-game record for touchdowns, and threw three of those scores to tight end Coby Fleener, who set a Stanford and Orange Bowl record with 173 receiving yards. Both teams made coaching changes after the game, as Stanford head coach Jim Harbaugh left the team to coach the National Football League's San Francisco 49ers and Virginia Tech replaced several assistant coaches.

=== 2012 Sugar Bowl ===
2012 Sugar Bowl
Michigan	Virginia Tech
23	20
	1	2	3	4	OT	Total
Michigan	0	10	7	3	3	23
Virginia Tech	3	3	3	11	0	20
- Date: January 3, 2012
- Stadium: Mercedes-Benz Superdome
- Location: New Orleans, Louisiana

The 2012 Sugar Bowl Game (known via sponsorship as the Allstate Sugar Bowl) was the 78th edition of the annual postseason college football bowl game known as the Sugar Bowl. It featured the Michigan Wolverines and the Virginia Tech Hokies on Tuesday, January 3, 2012, at the Mercedes-Benz Superdome in New Orleans, Louisiana. The game was the final contest of the 2011 football season for both teams and was the third game of the 2011–2012 Bowl Championship Series (BCS). The game ended with 23–20 Michigan victory in overtime. Michigan represented the Big Ten Conference (Big Ten) as the at-large team from the conference, while Virginia Tech represented the Atlantic Coast Conference (ACC) as its at-large team. The game was televised in the United States on ESPN and an estimated 9.6 million viewers watched the broadcast live. This was the first Sugar Bowl since 2000, as well as only the sixth since World War II and the tenth overall, not to feature a Southeastern Conference (SEC) team.

Michigan was offered a berth after it finished the season with a 10–2 record—its highest win total since the 2006 season—that ended with a 40–34 win against arch-rival Ohio State. Virginia Tech was offered a berth after it finished its season 11–2, which culminated in a 38–10 loss in the 2011 ACC Championship Game to Clemson. Media attention focused on the quality of the bowl selection, as both teams were criticized for not having strong schedules. Attention also focused on how Virginia Tech's defense would contain Michigan QB Denard Robinson.

The game kicked off at 8:32 pm Eastern Standard Time, and Virginia Tech scored first, converting its first possession into on a field goal. Virginia Tech added another field goal in the second quarter, but Michigan scored a touchdown in the final minute to take a 7–6 lead, and then recovered a Virginia Tech fumble on the ensuing kickoff. Michigan kicked a field goal as time expired in the first half to take a 10–6 lead. Michigan converted its first possession of the second half into a touchdown to take a 17–6 lead, but Virginia Tech added a field goal to narrow the lead to 17–9. In the fourth quarter, Virginia Tech scored a touchdown to narrow Michigan's lead to two points, and then converted a two-point conversion to tie the game. Michigan responded with a field goal, but Virginia Tech tied the game with a field goal with two seconds remaining. In overtime, Virginia Tech appeared to score the go-ahead touchdown on a diving catch by Danny Coale, but the call on the field was overturned upon video review. On the next play, Virginia Tech missed a crucial field goal. Michigan converted its field goal opportunity to win the game 23–20 in overtime.

In recognition of his performance, Michigan's Junior Hemingway was named the game's most valuable player. It was a catch.

=== 2012 Russell Athletic Bowl ===
2012 Russell Athletic Bowl
Rutgers	Virginia Tech
10	13
	1	2	3	4	OT	Total
Rutgers	10	0	0	0	0	10
Virginia Tech	0	0	0	10	3	13
- Date: December 28, 2012
- Stadium: Citrus Bowl
- Location: Orlando, Florida

The 2012 Russell Athletic Bowl, The 23rd edition of the Russell Athletic Bowl, was held on December 28, 2012, at the Citrus Bowl in Orlando, Florida with a 5:30 p.m. EST kickoff and aired on ESPN. It featured the Virginia Tech Hokies against the Big East Conference co-champion Rutgers Scarlet Knights, and was the final game of the 2012 NCAA Division I FBS football season for both teams. The Scarlet Knights accepted their invitation after achieving a 9–3 record in the regular season, while the Hokies accepted theirs after achieving a 6–6 record. Virginia Tech beat Rutgers 13–10 in overtime.

=== 2013 Sun Bowl ===
2013 Sun Bowl
Virginia Tech	UCLA
12	42
	1	2	3	4	Total
Virginia Tech	7	0	3	2	12
UCLA	7	7	0	28	42
- Date: December 31, 2013
- Stadium: Sun Bowl Stadium
- Location: El Paso, Texas

The 80th edition of the Hyundai Sun Bowl in El Paso, Texas was the 21st consecutive bowl appearance for Virginia Tech and Coach Beamer. The 2013 Sun Bowl featured the Hokies against the UCLA Bruins on Tuesday, December 31, 2013, and marked the first meeting between the two teams. The Hokies made their first appearance at Sun Bowl Stadium and their second Sun Bowl (the first being the 1947 Sun Bowl, the first bowl game of Virginia Tech's 27-bowl game history.) Virginia Tech lost the game to UCLA, 42–12.

=== 2014 Military Bowl ===
2014 Military Bowl
Virginia Tech	Cincinnati
33	17
	1	2	3	4	Total
Virginia Tech	7	6	14	6	33
Cincinnati	7	3	0	7	17
- Date: December 27, 2014
- Stadium: Navy–Marine Corps Memorial Stadium
- Location: Annapolis, Maryland

The 8th edition of the Military Bowl was played in Annapolis, Maryland at Jack Stephens Field (Navy-Marine Corps Stadium) and took place on Saturday, December 27, 2014. The Hokies of Virginia Tech beat the Cincinnati Bearcats 33–17. This was the 22nd consecutive bowl game for Virginia Tech.

=== 2015 Independence Bowl ===
2015 Independence Bowl
Tulsa Golden Hurricane	Virginia Tech
52	55
	1	2	3	4	Total
Tulsa Golden Hurricane	21	10	6	15	52
Virginia Tech	24	21	7	3	55
- Date: December 26, 2015
- Stadium: Independence Stadium
- Location: Shreveport, Louisiana

The 40th edition of the Independence Bowl was played in Shreveport, Louisiana at Independence Stadium and took place on Saturday, December 26, 2015. The Hokies of Virginia Tech defeated the Tulsa Golden Hurricane 55–52. This was the 23rd consecutive bowl game for Virginia Tech and Frank Beamer's final game as head coach of the Hokies football team.

=== 2016 Belk Bowl ===
2016 Belk Bowl
Arkansas	Virginia Tech
24	35
	1	2	3	4	Total
Arkansas	17	7	0	0	24
Virginia Tech	0	0	21	14	35
- Date: December 29, 2016
- Stadium: Bank of America Stadium
- Location: Charlotte, North Carolina

The 15th edition of the Belk Bowl was played in Charlotte, North Carolina on Thursday, December 29, 2016. This was the 24th consecutive bowl game for Virginia Tech and Justin Fuente's first bowl game as head coach of the Hokies football team. This was the first time ever these two teams played each other. The first and second halves were totally different in terms of how each team did. Virginia Tech was losing 24–0 at halftime but turned the game around in the second half aided by 3 interceptions and six sacks, and won 24–35. This resulted in a season record of 10–4 and was the first time a Hokie football coach won 10 games in his first season and the first Hokie 10-win season since 2011. This was the first time the Hokies won 3 straight bowl games. Only one of the 5 Hokie touchdowns was not the result of an Arkansas turnover. This was the only game in the college football 2016 in which a team trailing by 24 or more points ended up winning the game. There was a very confusing ruling in the second quarter that took the officials about 12 minutes to sort out. Arkansas punted and the Hokies muffed it. Arkansas touched the ball and the Hokies recovered. But there was also an inadvertent whistle blown. Officials disagree on what the ruling should have been. The game officials gave the ball back to Arkansas.

=== 2017 Camping World Bowl ===
2017 Camping World Bowl
Oklahoma State	Virginia Tech
30	21
	1	2	3	4	Total
Oklahoma State	3	10	14	3	30
Virginia Tech	7	0	7	7	21
- Date: December 28, 2017
- Stadium: Camping World Stadium
- Location: Orlando, Florida

The 2017 Camping World Bowl, The 28th edition of the bowl, held on December 28, 2017, at Camping World Stadium in Orlando, Florida with a 5:30 p.m. EST kickoff and aired on ESPN. It featured the Virginia Tech Hokies of the Atlantic Coast Football Conference against the Oklahoma State Cowboys of the Big XII Football Conference. Both teams entered the game with 9–3 records with the Cowboys ranked No. 17 and the Hokies ranked No. 22 in the final 2017 College Football Playoff rankings.

=== 2018 Military Bowl ===
2018 Military Bowl
Cincinnati	Virginia Tech
35	31
	1	2	3	4	Total
Cincinnati	7	7	7	14	35
Virginia Tech	7	7	10	7	31
- Date: December 31, 2018
- Stadium: Navy–Marine Corps Memorial Stadium
- Location: Annapolis, Maryland

The 11th edition of the Military Bowl was played in Annapolis, Maryland at Jack Stephens Field (Navy-Marine Corps Stadium) and took place on Monday, December 31, 2018. This was the 26th consecutive bowl game for Virginia Tech.

=== 2019 Belk Bowl ===
2019 Belk Bowl
Virginia Tech	Kentucky
30	37
	1	2	3	4	Total
Virginia Tech	10	7	10	3	30
Kentucky	7	7	10	13	37
- Date: December 31, 2019
- Stadium: Bank of America Stadium
- Location: Charlotte, North Carolina

The 18th edition of the Belk Bowl was played Tuesday, December 31, 2019, at Bank of America Stadium. It was the first meeting of the Hokies and Kentucky Wildcats since 1987. It was the 27th consecutive bowl game appearance for the Hokies.

=== 2021 Pinstripe Bowl ===
2021 Pinstripe Bowl
Maryland	Virginia Tech
54	10
	1	2	3	4	Total
Maryland	7	17	17	13	54
Virginia Tech	0	10	0	0	10
- Date: December 29, 2021
- Stadium: Yankee Stadium
- Location: Bronx, New York

The 11th edition of the Pinstripe Bowl was played Wednesday, December 29, 2021, at Yankee Stadium. It was Tech's first bowl game since their 27-year streak ended the following year. The teams met for the first time since 2013, when Maryland left the Atlantic Coast Conference. Both teams entered the game with 6–6 records. J. C. Price continued his stint as interim coach of the Hokies after Coach Fuente left with two games remaining in the regular season.

== See also ==
- Glossary of American football
