= 2012 Russell Athletic Bowl =

American college football game

Rutgers Scarlet Knights	Virginia Tech Hokies
(9–3)	(6–6)
Big East	ACC
10	13
Head coach: Kyle Flood	Head coach: Frank Beamer
	1	2	3	4	OT	Total
Rutgers	10	0	0	0	0	10
Virginia Tech	0	0	0	10	3	13
- Date: December 28, 2012
- Season: 2012
- Stadium: Florida Citrus Bowl
- Location: Orlando, Florida
- MVP: Antone Exum, Virginia Tech
- Favorite: Virginia Tech by 2½
- Referee: Scott Novak (Big 12)
- Attendance: 48,127

United States TV coverage
- Network: ESPN
- Announcers: Joe Tessitore (play-by-play); Matt Millen (analyst); Maria Taylor (sideline reporter)
- Nielsen ratings: 2.5

The 2012 Russell Athletic Bowl was a postseason American college football bowl game held on December 28, 2012, at the Citrus Bowl in Orlando, Florida in the United States. This was the first under the Russell Athletic moniker after eight game under Champs Sports. The 23rd edition of the Russell Athletic Bowl began at 5:30 p.m. EST and aired on ESPN. It featured the Big East Conference co-champion Rutgers Scarlet Knights against the Virginia Tech Hokies from the Atlantic Coast Conference (ACC), and was the final game of the 2012 NCAA Division I FBS football season for both teams. The Hokies accepted their invitation after achieving a 6–6 record in the regular season, while the Scarlet Knights accepted theirs after achieving a 9–3 record.

This was the first Russell Athletic Bowl for both teams.

== Teams ==
This was the fifteenth meeting between these two teams. Virginia Tech leads the all-time record 12–3. The last time they played was in 2003. The teams were conference rivals in the old Big East Conference from 1991 to 2003.

=== Rutgers ===
The Scarlet Knights finished in a four-way tie for the Big East title with a 5–2 conference record (holding the tiebreaker over the Syracuse Orange and Cincinnati Bearcats but behind the Louisville Cardinals. After losing to said Cardinals in their season finale, the Scarlet Knights accepted an invitation to the 2012 Russell Athletic Bowl.

=== Virginia Tech ===
A disastrous season by Virginia Tech standards, the Hokies were in danger of being bowl-ineligible for the first time since 1992. However, in their final two games the Hokies defeated their rivals the Boston College Eagles as well as Commonwealth Cup rivals the Virginia Cavaliers, finishing 6–6 and becoming bowl-eligible.

== Game summary ==
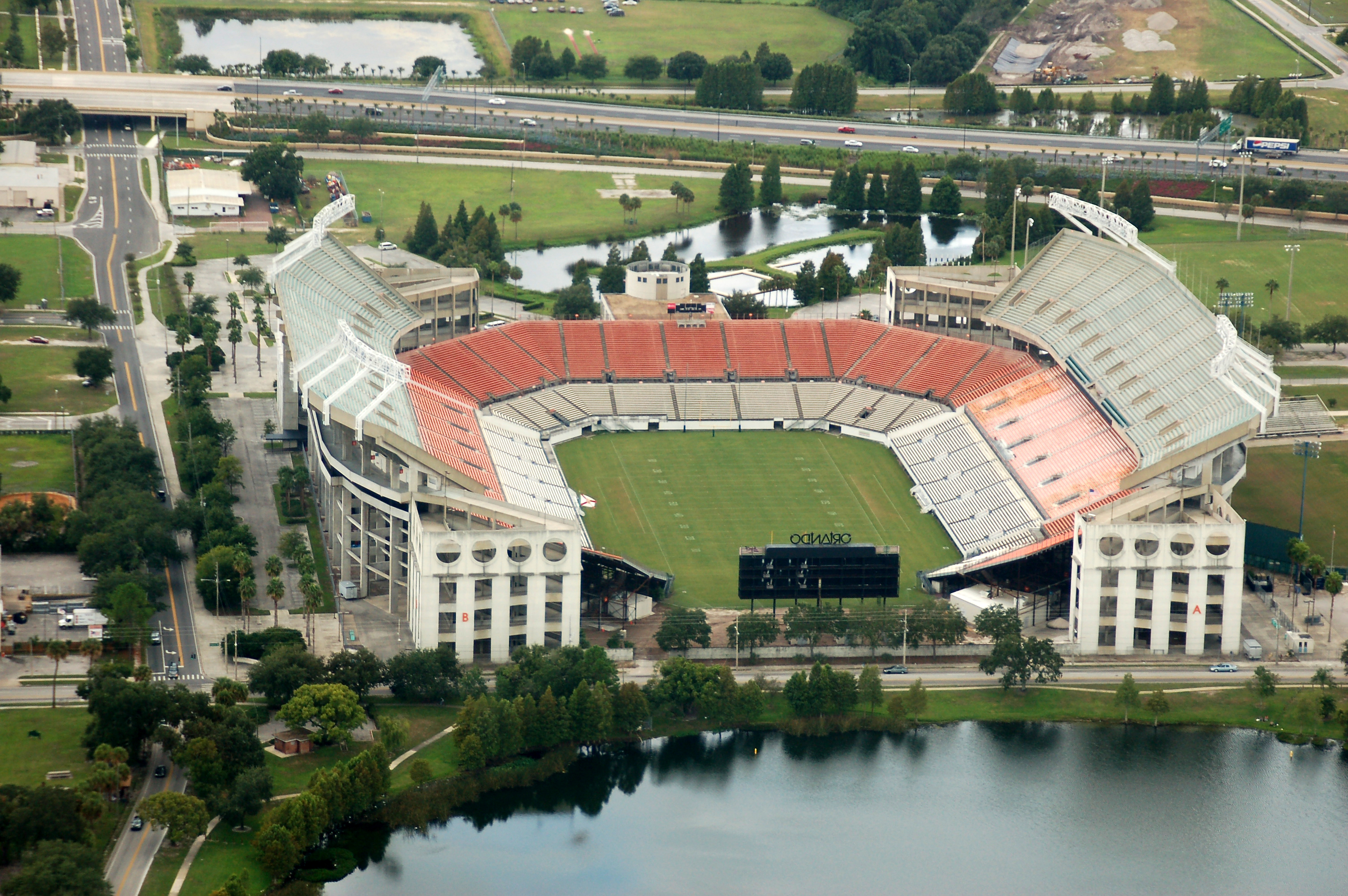
The 2012 Russell Athletic Bowl was played at Florida Citrus Bowl Stadium.

=== First half ===
Rutgers scored 17 seconds into the game after Virginia Tech center Caleb Farris snapped the ball past Hokies quarterback Logan Thomas into the end zone. Thomas attempted to pick the fumbled ball up in the end zone, but lost the ball as he was tackled. Rutgers linebacker Khaseem Greene recovered the ball for a touchdown to give Rutgers a 7–0 lead. The Scarlet Knights took a 10–0 lead later in the first quarter on a 36-yard field goal from Nick Borgese.

In the second quarter, the Hokies failed to cross midfield, while Rutgers drove into Virginia Tech territory twice. Rutgers was unable to score, however, turning the ball on downs on its first drive into Hokies territory and punting on its second trip. The Scarlet Knights took a 10–0 lead going into halftime.

=== Second half ===
The third quarter remained scoreless, as the two teams exchanged punts. In the fourth quarter, the Scarlet Knights were unable to extend their lead after Rutgers placekicker Nick Borgese missed a 47-yard field goal. Helped by two long passed from Hokies quarterback Logan Thomas, the Hokies were able to drive to Rutgers' 8-yard line. However, the Hokies were unable to get a touchdown and settled for a 25-yard field to make the score 10–3. On the ensuing drive, Rutgers quarterback Gary Nova was intercepted by Virginia Tech's Antone Exum. Exum returned the interception 32 yards to Rutgers 21-yard line. Taking advantage of the good field position, the Hokies tied the game 10–10 on a 21-yard touchdown pass from Logan Thomas to Corey Fuller. Virginia Tech had a couple more attempts in the fourth quarter to win the game in regulation. The Hokies recovered a fumble at Rutgers' 29-yard line, but were forced to punt after committing penalties. After getting the ball back, the Hokies once again drove into Rutgers' territory, but were unable to get any points after missing a 51-yard field goal. The score remained tied 10–10 going into overtime.

Virginia Tech received possession first in overtime. The Hokies were able to get to Rutgers' 3-yard line thanks to a 19-yard pass from Logan Thomas to Marcus Davis. Virginia Tech was unable to score a touchdown, however, and had to settle for a 22-yard field goal to go up 13–10. The Scarlet Knights attempted to force a second overtime on a 42-yard field goal attempt from Nick Borgese. Borgese's kick missed wide right, however, sealing the victory for Virginia Tech.

=== Notes and records ===
A 2012 Russell Athletic Bowl featured a record 20 combined punts and a record low 23 combined points. The bowl victory for the Hokies also marked Virginia Tech's 12th consecutive victory over Rutgers and gave the Hokies' its 21st consecutive winning season.

== Scoring summary ==
Scoring summary

Quarter	Time	Drive			Team	Scoring information	Score	
Quarter	Time	Plays	Yards	TOP	Team	Scoring information	Rutgers	Virginia Tech
1	14:43	-	-	-	Rutgers	Fumble recovery returned 0 yards for touchdown by Khaseem Greene, Nick Borgese kick good	7	0
1	2:38	5	27	1:20	Rutgers	36-yard field goal by Nick Borgese	10	0
4	12:14	6	62	2:35	Virginia Tech	25-yard field goal by Cody Journell	10	3
4	10:56	3	21	0:15	Virginia Tech	Corey Fuller 21-yard touchdown reception from Logan Thomas, Cody Journell kick good	10	10
OT	-	5	20	-	Virginia Tech	22-yard field goal by Cody Journell	10	13
"TOP" = time of possession. For other American football terms, see Glossary of American football.							10	13
