= 2006 Chick-fil-A Bowl =

American college football game

- 39th Peach Bowl
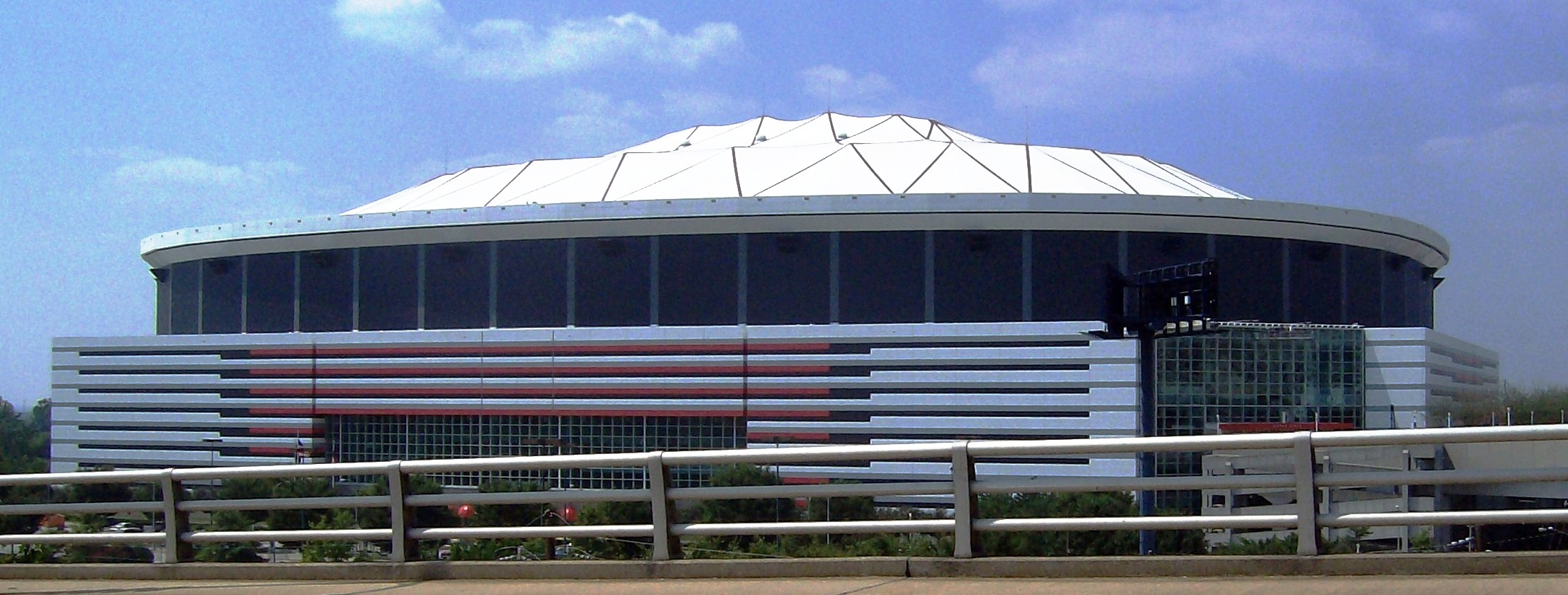
- The Georgia Dome in Atlanta, Georgia, hosted the Chick-fil-A Bowl.
Georgia Bulldogs	Virginia Tech Hokies
(8–4)	(10–2)
SEC	ACC
31	24
Head coach: Mark Richt	Head coach: Frank Beamer
	AP / Coaches / BCS; 14 / 14 / 15
	1	2	3	4	Total
Georgia	3	0	10	18	31
Virginia Tech	0	21	0	3	24
- Date: December 30, 2006
- Season: 2006
- Stadium: Georgia Dome
- Location: Atlanta, Georgia, US
- MVP: Tony Taylor (defense), Matthew Stafford (offense)
- Favorite: Virginia Tech by 2.5–3
- Referee: Jon Bible (Big 12)
- Halftime show: Marching Virginians, Georgia Redcoats
- Attendance: 75,406

United States TV coverage
- Network: ESPN
- Announcers: Ron Franklin; Ed Cunningham; Jerry Punch
- Nielsen ratings: 4.8

The 2006 Chick-fil-A Bowl was a college football bowl game between the Georgia Bulldogs and the Virginia Tech Hokies at the Georgia Dome in Atlanta, Georgia, United States. With sponsorship from Chick-fil-A, it was the 39th edition of the game previously (and later) known as the Peach Bowl. Georgia represented the Southeastern Conference (SEC) and Virginia Tech represented the Atlantic Coast Conference (ACC) in the competition. The game was the final game of the 2006 football season for each team and resulted in a 31–24 Georgia victory, even though spread bettors favored Virginia Tech to win by three points. In exchange for the right to pick the first ACC team after the Bowl Championship Series selections, bowl representatives paid US$3.25 million to the ACC, while the SEC, whose fifth team was selected, received $2.4 million. The combined $5.65 million payout was the seventh-largest among all college football bowl games, and the fourth-largest non-BCS bowl game payout.

In a game that was expected to be a defensive struggle, Virginia Tech took a 21–3 lead in the first half. After halftime, Georgia answered Tech's first-half success, thanks in part to four second-half turnovers by Tech quarterback Sean Glennon. Virginia Tech's No. 1 ranked defense struggled in the second half, allowing 153 yards (of 200 total) in the final 30 minutes. As time ran out, Georgia held a one-touchdown lead, 31–24, having beaten back a last-second Tech rally. 75,406 people attended the game, making it the 10th consecutive Peach Bowl sellout, the largest crowd to ever attend an event at the Georgia Dome, and the third-largest bowl game in terms of attendance for the 2006–2007 season. Each school sold out its allotment of 18,500 tickets quickly. 31,922 people attended the Chick-fil-A "fan fest" before the game, setting a new attendance record. Virginia Tech's loss brought it to a final 2006 record of 10–3, while Georgia's final-game win earned it a record of 9–4.

== Selection process ==
Beginning with the 2006 game, the Chick-fil-A Bowl had purchased the right to select the highest-ranked Atlantic Coast Conference team after representatives from the Bowl Championship Series made their selection. According to the official selection rules still used today, the team chosen to represent the ACC must be within one conference victory of the remaining, highest-ranked conference team or be ranked more than five spaces ahead of the ACC team with the best Conference record available in the final BCS Standings.

In choosing the SEC opponent, the Chick-fil-A Bowl selection committee had the right to select the first SEC school after the Bowl Championship Series, Cotton Bowl Classic, Capital One Bowl, and Outback Bowl made their selections. Just as in the ACC, the selection committee could not select an SEC team with two more losses than the highest available team. The bowl earned the right to select these teams via its multimillion-dollar payout system, which guarantees a certain amount of money to the participating conferences. Prior to 2006, the Chick-fil-A Bowl (then known as the Peach Bowl) matched the No. 5 team in the SEC versus the No. 3 team in the ACC. After the bowl increased its payout to $2.8 million per squad, it then was given the second pick from the ACC, with the Gator Bowl dropping to third.

Leeman Bennett, the former head coach of the Atlanta Falcons and Tampa Bay Buccaneers, served as chairman of the selection committee, which had the task of picking the best teams from those made available by the selection criteria set by the two conferences. The committee would have approximately one month to select the two teams that would attract the most people to the game and generate the largest possible television audience. This fact helped eliminate ACC runner-up Georgia Tech from the selection process, as the Yellow Jackets had already played Georgia earlier in the season, thus making a potential Georgia-Georgia Tech showdown less attractive. In addition, that matchup, while attractive to football fans in the Atlanta area (the site of the Chick-fil-A Bowl and home to Georgia Tech), would have less appeal to television viewers outside the Georgia area. Supervising the selection committee was the Chick-fil-A Bowl Executive Committee, which consisted of representatives from various Atlanta businesses and the Chick-fil-A corporation.

== Pregame buildup ==
On the morning of December 3, 2006, Chick-fil-A Bowl representatives selected Virginia Tech to represent the ACC in the 2006 Chick-fil-A Bowl. A few hours later, Georgia was selected as the second half of the matchup. Two days after the selections were announced, the game was declared sold out, the 10th consecutive sellout in the combined history of the Peach and Chick-fil-A Bowls. Georgia and Virginia Tech each were assigned initial allocations of 18,500 tickets for distribution, and following the quick sales of those ticket blocs, each asked for and received additional tickets to distribute.

The game was the third time Virginia Tech and the University of Georgia faced each other on the football field. The two previous games—one in 1931 and the other in 1932—resulted in one loss and one win for each team. Various casinos and betting organizations favored Virginia Tech by 2.5–3 points when setting their point spread.

=== Media coverage ===
Media discussion of the game in the weeks leading up to kickoff centered on the Hokies' No. 1-nationally ranked defense and Georgia's 5th-ranked SEC defense. Most pundits predicted a low-scoring game, and a few predicted an "all-out defensive war". A week before departing for Atlanta, Virginia Tech head coach Frank Beamer revealed that Ike Whitaker, Virginia Tech's backup quarterback, would not be attending the game for undisclosed reasons. It was later revealed that Whitaker had been admitted to an alcohol treatment center in Salem, Virginia.

For Georgia, discussion centered on the play-calling duties of assistant coach Mike Bobo. Bobo had been named the temporary offensive coordinator for the Bulldogs after then-assistant coordinator Neil Calloway had been named the new head coach at the University of Alabama-Birmingham. Calloway would remain with the Bulldogs as the offensive line coach during the Chick-fil-A Bowl, but Bobo would take over his role as offensive coordinator for the game. It was only the second time that Bobo performed as a play-caller for the Bulldogs, the previous game having come in Georgia's regular-season closer, a 15–12 win against Georgia Tech.

=== Offensive matchups ===
With the fifth-ranked defense in the SEC going up against the number-one ranked scoring defense in the nation, attention centered on the likelihood of a low-scoring defensive struggle. Of particular interest were the two teams' quarterbacks and how they would likely fare against such a tough defense. Georgia struggled on offense for much of the season, resulting in a battle for the starting quarterback position between senior Joe Tereshinski and freshman Matthew Stafford. Though Stafford was eventually given the starting role, he struggled in his first year, completing 126 of 235 passes (53.6%) for 1,620 yards, with six touchdowns and 12 interceptions heading into the Chick-fil-A Bowl. On the opposite side of the field, Virginia Tech would be starting redshirt sophomore Sean Glennon. Named the starting quarterback at the beginning of the 2006 season, Glennon replaced Marcus Vick, who had been expelled from Virginia Tech at the end of the previous year. While not as statistically successful as Marcus Vick, Glennon still managed to lead the Hokies to their third consecutive 10-win season, and had the edge over Stafford in terms of experience.

On the ground, it appeared that Virginia Tech had the edge in experience, forcing Georgia's defense to concentrate on stopping Tech's run game. Virginia Tech running back Branden Ore suffered an ankle injury in the Hokies' regular-season game against Wake Forest, but still took the field in the Chick-fil-A Bowl. The same could not be said for Georgia, whose original starting running back, Thomas Brown, suffered a season-ending knee injury in October. Filling his role were two inexperienced players: Kregg Lumpkin and Danny Ware. Making up for this inexperience, the two players were coached by Tony Ball, a former Virginia Tech wide receivers coach with insights into the Tech defense.

With Ore still not fully recovered from his injury and two inexperienced players on the Georgia side, it appeared that the teams' passing offenses would have to take up the slack. Virginia Tech's Eddie Royal, with 452 receiving yards, led both teams in receiving yardage coming into the game. Georgia's receiving corps was led by wide receiver Mohammed Massaquoi and tight end Martrez Milner. Massaquoi caught 28 passes for 348 yards and two touchdowns coming into the game, while Milner had 27 receptions for 376 yards and two touchdowns.

=== Defensive matchups ===
Each offense would face tough defense in the air and on the ground. The Virginia Tech defense, led by junior linebackers Vince Hall and Xavier Adibi, was expected to present a challenge for the Georgia offense. "You try to find some kind of mismatch, but it's very difficult to do", Georgia head coach Mark Richt said before kickoff. "That's why they're the best (defense) in the country. Their interior defensive linemen are very, very strong and physical, and, really, everybody else is built for speed. Their edge rushers are tremendous, and their linebackers are outstanding and physical. Their defensive backs can all run and hit. It's going to be a real challenge." Of particular concern for quarterback Matt Stafford were Virginia Tech's cornerbacks, whom he would have to go through in order to complete passes to his receivers. "They play kind of a different scheme than a lot of teams so it would be tough if you only had one week to try to prepare for these guys", Stafford said in an interview prior to the game. "They trust their corners a lot, but they've got good ones and can. They lock up a lot of time single receiver side because they've got a good corner down there that plays on the boundary."

Georgia's defense, ranked fifth in the SEC, was no less a concern for Virginia Tech's offense. "Defense is one of the major aspects of the SEC", said Georgia center Nick Jones before the game. "You face great defenses week in and week out, and we face a great one week in and week out in practice against our defense. We've been up against great defenses and great personnel, so it's nothing new for us." Heading into the game, Georgia was ranked ninth in total defense, giving up only 264 yards per game, and 22nd in scoring defense, allowing an average of just 17.1 points a game.

== Game summary ==
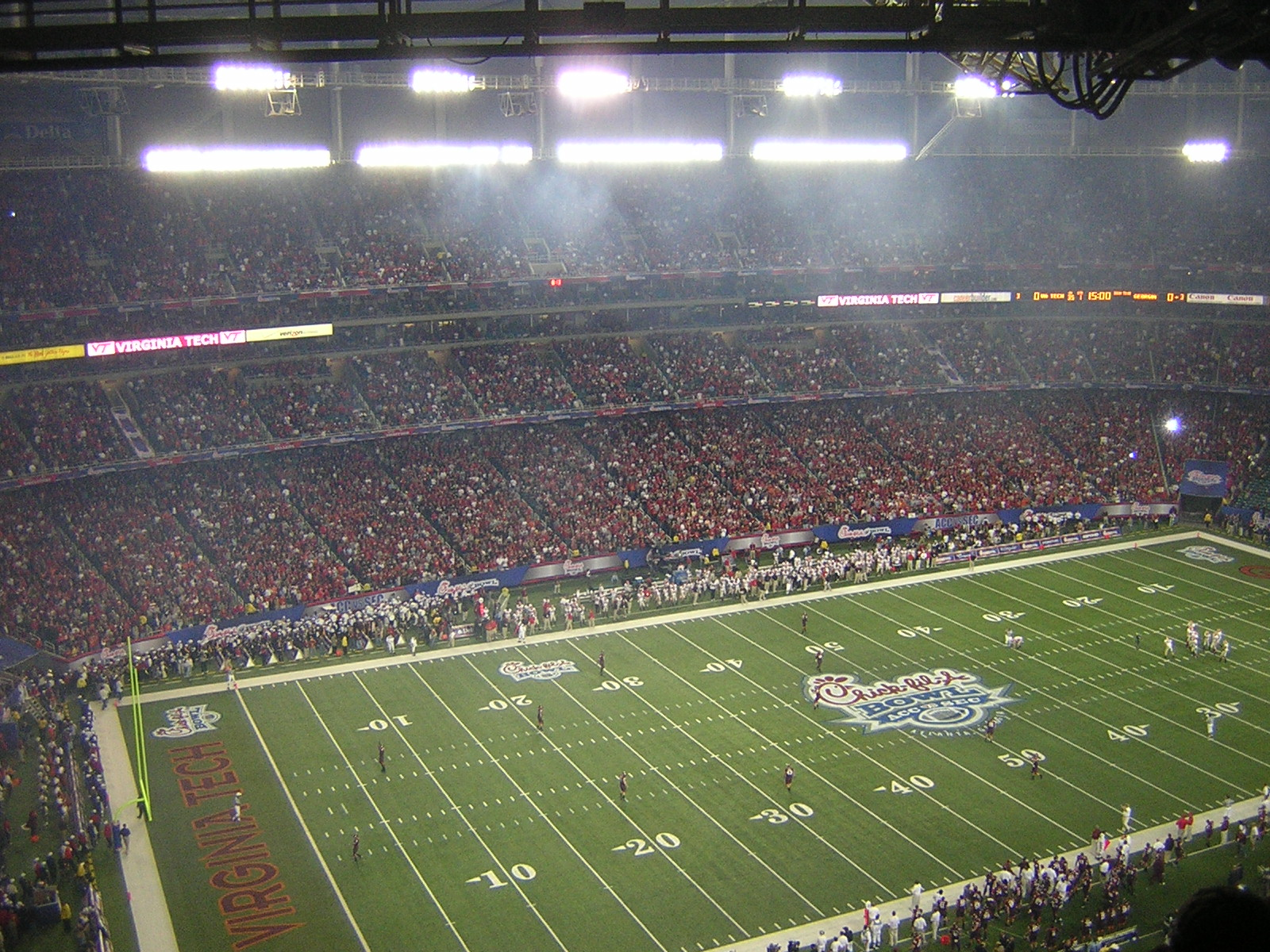
Virginia Tech and Georgia prepare to kick off.

The 2006 Chick-fil-A bowl kicked off on December 30, 2006, at 8:00 p.m. The game was nationally televised on ESPN, with over 5 million households tuning into the game at home, enough to earn ESPN a television rating of 4.8 for the broadcast. 75,406 people attended the game in person, making it the 10th consecutive Chick-fil-A Bowl sell-out, the first since the word "Peach" was dropped from the title, the largest crowd ever to attend an event at the Georgia Dome, and the third-largest bowl game in terms of attendance for the 2006–2007 season. 31,922 people attended the Chick-fil-A "fan fest" prior to the game, setting a new attendance record. Due to the proximity of Atlanta to the University of Georgia's main campus in Athens, Georgia, gave Georgia a home-field advantage. but the Virginia Tech fans, known for traveling well to their bowl appearances, quickly bought out their school's allotment of tickets and ensured a divided crowd.

=== First quarter ===
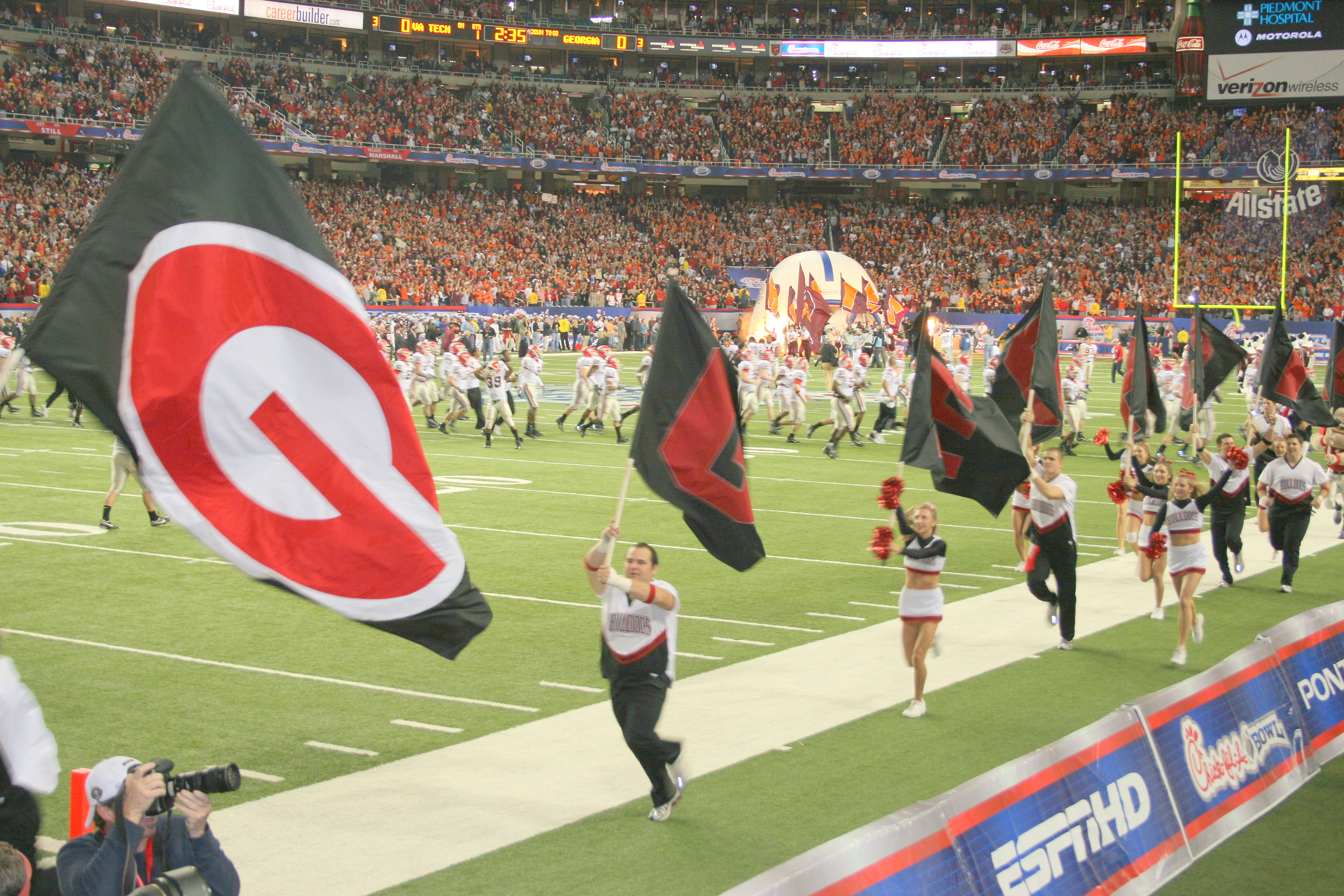
Georgia enters the game.

Defense dominated in the first quarter of the game. Virginia Tech received the opening kickoff, but failed to capitalize on its opening drive thanks to a personal foul penalty that forced the Hokies to punt. On its first possession, Georgia moved into scoring position courtesy of a 26-yard run by Kregg Lumpkin. Failing to advance the ball further, Georgia sent in kicker Brandon Coutu who kicked a 39-yard field goal to give Georgia the early lead, 3–0.

The two teams proceeded to trade possessions, with no side able to gain an advantage over the other's defense. Tech received the kickoff from Georgia, but was again hampered by penalties after earning a first down. After the Virginia Tech punt, Georgia went three-and-out, punting to the Hokies, who also went three-and-out.

After taking possession on his own 16-yard line, Georgia quarterback and true freshman Matthew Stafford caused the first turning point of the game as he threw an interception to Brenden Hill of Virginia Tech. Starting deep in Georgia territory, Virginia Tech was further aided by a personal foul on Georgia, which set up a first-and-goal situation for Virginia Tech on the Georgia 6-yard line. A two-yard run by Virginia Tech tailback Branden Ore brought the ball closer to the goal line and ended the first quarter of play.

At the end of the first quarter, Georgia led Virginia Tech 3–0.

=== Second quarter ===
The second quarter began with Virginia Tech inside the Georgia 10-yard line. After two unsuccessful plays, Virginia Tech was finally able to reach the end zone on a Branden Ore one-yard rush in a fourth-and-one situation. The touchdown and extra point gave Virginia Tech a 7–3 lead with 13:23 left in the half.

Georgia began its first possession with a 25-yard kickoff return, but failed to earn a first down in the face of a tough Hokie defensive effort. Georgia punter Gordon Ely-Kelso kicked a 56-yard punt following the Virginia Tech defensive stop. A breakdown in special teams coverage by Georgia allowed Virginia Tech kick returner Eddie Royal to break free, returning the kick 56 yards back to the original line of scrimmage. As a result of the excellent field position provided by the return, Virginia Tech was able to drive the remaining 30 yards to the end zone. Branden Ore earned his second touchdown of the game, making the score 14–3 with 6:13 remaining on the clock.

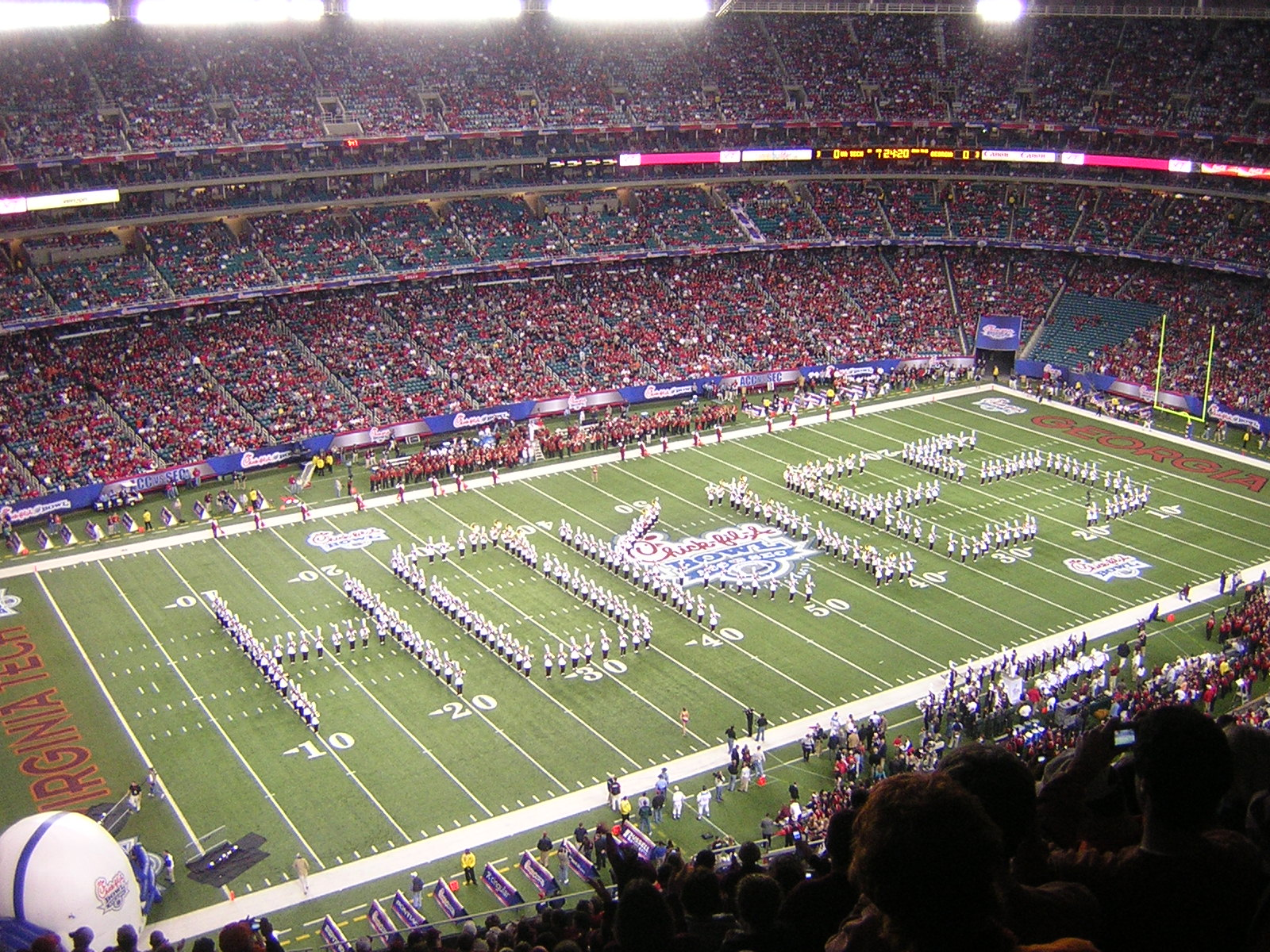
The Marching Virginians of Virginia Tech make the "HOKIES" formation during halftime

After a short return, Georgia QB Stafford went to work on the Georgia 24-yard line. Two incomplete passes and one sack later, Georgia was again punting. Virginia Tech again was in excellent field position, starting on their own 47-yard line. Instead of rushing the ball, as had been the trend for the Tech offense up to that point, Virginia Tech head coach Frank Beamer called for a trick play. At the snap, quarterback Sean Glennon lateraled the football to wide receiver Eddie Royal. Rather than running the ball, Royal threw the ball downfield, catching the Georgia defense off guard. Tight end Sam Wheeler, the target of the throw, had been left uncovered by a defense expecting a run. The pass was completed, and Wheeler ran unimpeded 53 yards for a touchdown. The play took 19 seconds to execute, and gave Virginia Tech a 21–3 lead with 4:00 remaining in the half.

Georgia was again unable to earn a first down in the ensuing possession, and attempted three straight rushing plays that earned a total of six yards. After a Georgia punt, Virginia Tech ran two rushing plays before attempting the same Royal pass that had gone for a touchdown earlier. Georgia, having anticipated the play, sacked Royal for a loss of two yards, ending the first half.

At halftime, Virginia Tech led Georgia 21–3.

=== Third quarter ===
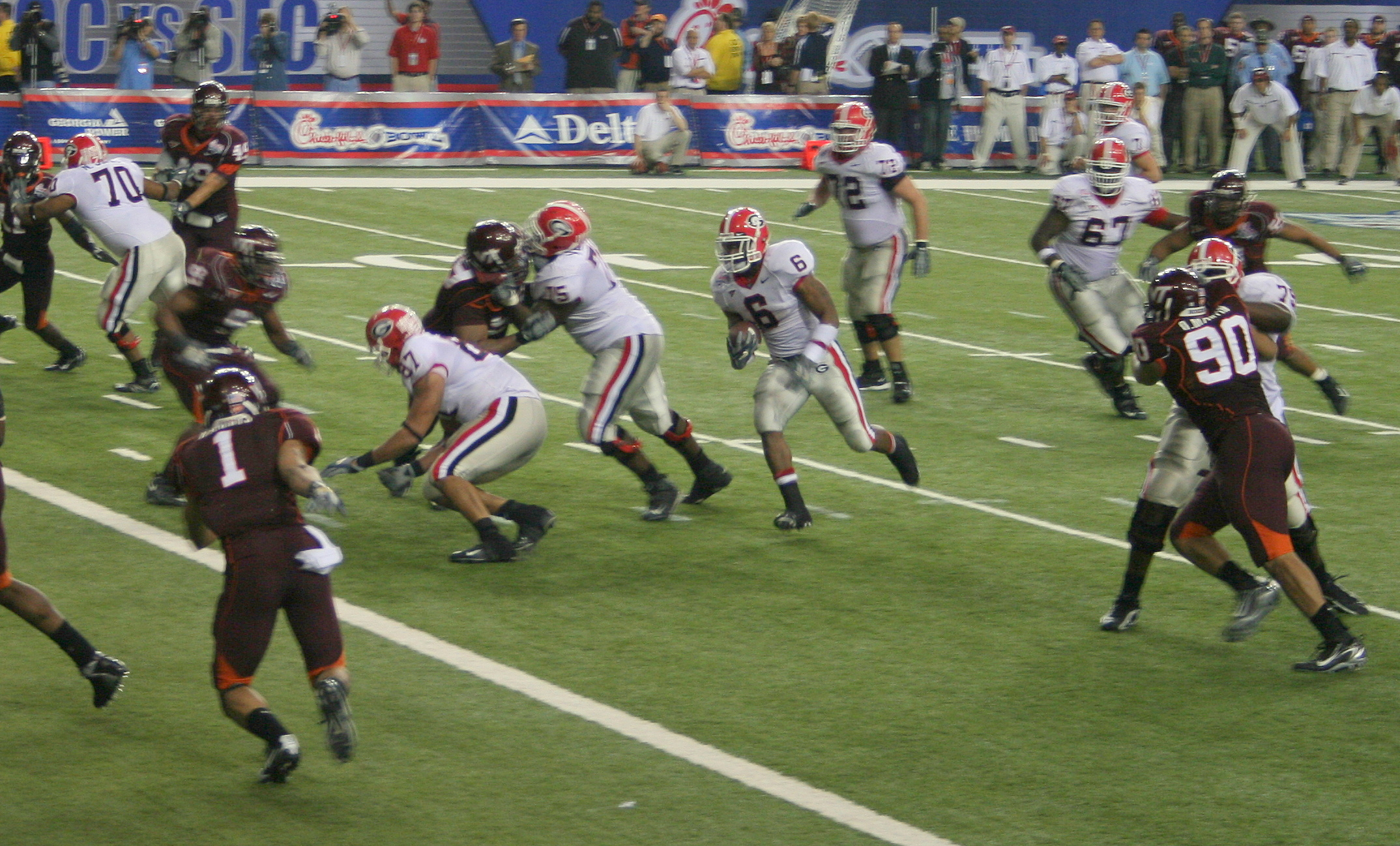
Georgia's offense executes a running play as Virginia Tech defenders run to stop the advance.

Because Virginia Tech had received the opening kickoff, Georgia received the ball to open the second half. Stafford was able to connect with wide receiver Mario Raley for a 24-yard gain, taking Georgia to the 50-yard line, but Virginia Tech's defense stiffened and Georgia was forced to punt. Pinned at their ten-yard line by the Georgia punt, Virginia Tech went three-and-out and was itself forced to punt.

A 19-yard punt return by Mikey Henderson put Georgia into good field position. Stafford capitalized on the opportunity, completing a 26-yard pass to put Georgia into field-goal range. After three unsuccessful plays, kicker Brandon Coutu connected on a 51-yard field goal to cut the Virginia Tech lead to 21–6.

On the kickoff following the field goal, Georgia head coach Mark Richt ordered an unorthodox onside kick. Surprised by the unexpected play, the Virginia Tech coverage team was unable to recover the ball, which was leapt upon by the kicker, Brian Mimbs. With a new chance at offense and a sense of optimism triggered by the successful onside kick, Georgia drove down the field. Aided by 20 yards in penalties against Virginia Tech, the drive resulted in a six-yard touchdown pass to Martrez Milner. The touchdown and extra point boosted Georgia's morale and cut the score to 21–13, Virginia Tech leading by eight.

The third quarter came to a close as Virginia Tech struggled to answer the two Georgia scores. Tech quarterback Sean Glennon connected on a 29-yard pass to Eddie Royal, driving the Hokies to the Bulldog 47-yard line as the clock hit zero.

At the end of the third quarter, Virginia Tech still led Georgia, 21–13.

=== Fourth quarter ===
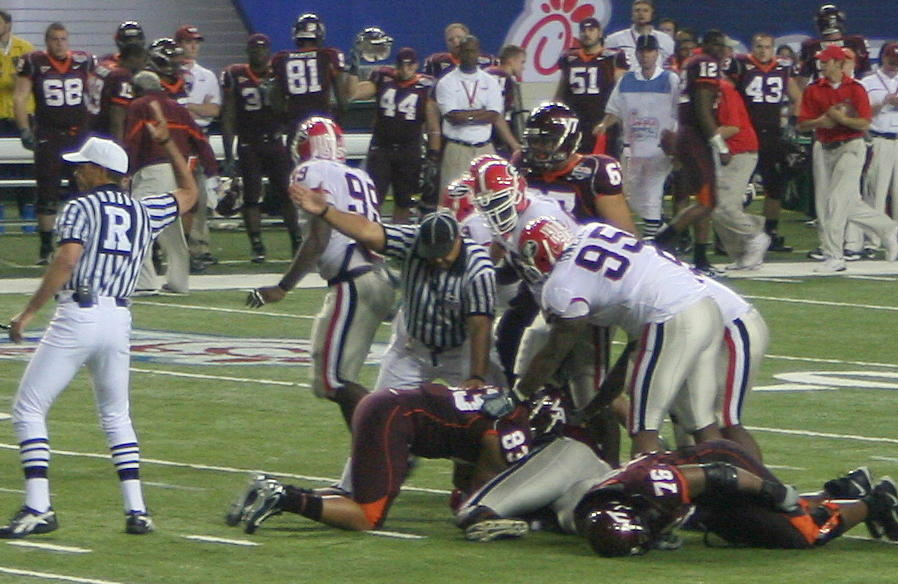
Referees sort out possession after a fumble

The fourth quarter began with Virginia Tech searching for a way to answer Georgia's previous two scores and quash the momentum Georgia had picked up. On the third play of the quarter, however, Virginia Tech quarterback Sean Glennon threw an interception to Georgia's Tony Taylor. Beginning on their own 35-yard line, Georgia capitalized on the mistake quickly, courtesy of a 15-yard personal foul penalty and a 41-yard completion from Stafford to Milner. Georgia, hoping to tie the time, attempted and completed a two-point conversion. The resulting scores tied the game at 21–21 with 12:39 remaining in the game.

Virginia Tech's hopes to answer were smashed on the first play after Georgia's kickoff as Glennon fumbled the snap, losing the ball to Georgia's Quentin Moses. Georgia failed to pick up a first down following the turnover, but the fumble did turn into three points for the Bulldogs, as kicker Brandon Coutu connected on his third field goal of the day, giving Georgia its first lead since the first quarter, 24–21.

After the Georgia kickoff, Glennon was again intercepted by Tony Taylor, who earned his second interception on the day and created Glennon's third turnover. Taylor returned the ball 16 yards to the Tech one-yard line, setting up an easy touchdown for the Bulldogs. With 6:54 remaining, Georgia took a 31–21 lead over Virginia Tech.

On the ensuing Tech possession, Tech's quarterback continued to play poorly. On the third play following the kickoff, Glennon was intercepted for the fourth time in the game. The downfield interception set up Georgia at their own 11-yard line. Georgia rushed the ball three times, forcing Virginia Tech to use two timeouts in order to stop the clock. The punt by Georgia's Ely-Kelso was poorly done, and traveled only 15 yards before going out of bounds.

As a result of the excellent field position, Virginia Tech seemed in position for an easy score. However, after a quick Tech first down, the Georgia defense stiffened and Tech was forced to settle for a field goal. The 28-yard kick by Brandon Pace cut Georgia's lead to 31–24, but only 3:42 remained on the clock. Due to the short time remaining, Virginia Tech was forced to attempt an onside kick in order to have another chance at offense. The kick was recovered by Georgia, however, and the Bulldogs proceeded to rush the ball in three consecutive plays, forcing the Hokies to use their last timeout in order to conserve time for one final drive.

Georgia's punt rolled into the end zone for a touchback, and with 1:28 remaining in the game, Virginia Tech began the final drive on its own 20-yard line. Any tension was soon defused by the Georgia defense, which forced three incompletions and a sack. Glennon's attempt at a Hail Mary pass fell short, giving Georgia the win with a final score of 31–24.

== Final statistics ==
Statistical comparison
	UGA	VA Tech
1st downs	9	9
Total yards	200	189
Passing yards	129	147
Rushing yards	71	42
Penalties	4–31	8–78
3rd down conversions	3–14	3–13
4th down conversions	1–1	1–2
Turnovers	1	4
Time of possession	30:23	29:37

The 18-point comeback was the largest for Georgia under coach Mark Richt up to that point. In recognition of their performances during the game, Georgia linebacker Tony Taylor and quarterback Matthew Stafford were named the defensive and offensive MVPs of the game, respectively. Taylor's two interceptions tied the Georgia bowl record for interceptions, first set by Scott Woerner and Ronnie Harris. The four Virginia Tech turnovers resulted in 18 Georgia points. Georgia's sole turnover resulted in seven points for Virginia Tech.

=== Georgia statistical recap ===
Individual Leaders
Georgia Passing
	C/ATT^{*}	Yds	TD	INT
Matt Stafford	9/21	129	1	1
Georgia Rushing
	Car^{a}	Yds	TD	LG^{b}
K. Lumpkin	12	39	1	26
D. Ware	6	24	0	8
B. Southerland	6	5	1	4
Georgia Receiving
	Rec^{c}	Yds	TD	LG^{b}
M. Milner	3	49	1	41
M. Massaquoi	2	18	0	12
B. Southerland	1	27	0	27
M. Raley	1	24	0	24

^{*} Completions/Attempts ^{a} Carries ^{b} Long play ^{c} Receptions

Over a third of Georgia's 71 rushing yards came on a single 26-yard run in the first quarter by halfback Kregg Lumpkin. After the run, Lumpkin would amass only 13 additional yards in the remaining three quarters of play. Over half of Georgia's total offensive yards (200 total yards) came through the air from Stafford, who finished with 129 passing yards, one interception, and one touchdown. Approximately a third (41 yards) of Stafford's passing yards came on a single completion in the fourth quarter. Another long pass play netted Stafford 24 yards. Together, the two plays accounted for half of Stafford's total passing yards. Seven other completions netted only 64 yards, an average of just over 9 yards a play.

Georgia's kicking game had a far more active day than its offense. Punter Gordon Ely-Kelso booted seven punts and kicker Brandon Coutu nailed three field goals. The field goals, kicked from 39, 51, and 28 yards away and two extra points made Coutu Georgia's leading scorer in the game, earning 11 points. Ely-Kelso netted 264 yards in punts, an average of 37.7 yards per kick. Though not long, the punts were high enough in the air to allow Georgia's special teams to get downfield and prevent long punt returns. Only two of Ely-Kelso's punts were returned by Tech kick returner Eddie Royal, and one return was for negative yardage.

Georgia's defense managed a strong performance statistically and in real terms. The most obvious examples of this were the three interceptions and one forced fumble that proved to be the turning point in the game. Two of the interceptions were caught by linebacker Tony Taylor, who also had nine tackles, two for a loss of yards. The tackles tied him with Paul Oliver, who also had nine. The third interception came from Kelin Johnson, while the fumble was forced by Charles Johnson. Johnson had an active day as well. In addition to the forced fumble, he recorded four tackles, two sacks, and a pass break-up.

The defensive play of Taylor, Oliver, and Johnson greatly affected the course of the game and is apparent in Georgia's time of possession and average starting position in each of the quarters. During the first and second quarters, Georgia had average starting positions on their own 19 and 26-yard lines, respectively. Their first-quarter time of possession was just 5:41, and their second-quarter possession time was 6:34. During the third and fourth quarters, when all four Virginia Tech turnovers took place, Georgia's time of possession jumped to 10:41 and 7:47, respectively. In the third quarter, their average starting possession gained ten yards to the Georgia 36, and during the final quarter, their average starting position was the Virginia Tech 36-yard line. This fact allowed Georgia to capitalize on the Virginia Tech turnovers, turning them into points on the scoreboard.

=== Virginia Tech statistical recap ===
Individual Leaders
Virginia Tech Passing
	C/ATT	Yds	TD	INT
Sean Glennon	13/26	94	0	3
Eddie Royal	1/1	53	1	0
Virginia Tech Rushing
	Car	Yds	TD	LG
B. Ore	20	42	2	6
K. Lewis	2	5	0	8
S. Glennon	4	(−5)	0	11
Virginia Tech Receiving
	Rec	Yds	TD	LG
E. Royal	4	45	0	28
B. Ore	4	11	0	7
J. Morgan	2	14	0	7
S. Wheeler	1	53	1	53

Sean Glennon's four turnovers tied a career-high for interceptions and brought his season interception mark to 11. He completed 13 of his 26 passes for 94 yards and a completion percentage of 50%. The passing total of 94 yards was the second-lowest total in the entire season, coming behind only a November 4 game in Miami where Glennon passed for just 86 yards in the face of a tough defense. In a statistic unusual for the 2006 season, Glennon was not the only Tech player to complete a pass. Wide receiver Eddie Royal's 53-yard TD pass made him just the third Virginia Tech player to complete a pass during the 2006 season. The play on which Royal made his throw, a lateral WR pass, had been attempted once previously in the season during a 38–27 loss to Georgia Tech.

On the ground, the Hokies had even less success than they did in the air. Branden Ore, Tech's starting tailback, earned 42 yards in 20 short rushes during the game. With a long run of eight yards, Ore was kept in check by Georgia's defense. The only other Hokie to achieve positive yardage on the ground was backup tailback Kenny Lewis, who only managed five yards. Glennon was sacked three times, once fumbling the ball. These sacks wiped out the 11 rushing yards he managed to gain during his scrambles for yardage. In the second quarter, Virginia Tech was aided by excellent field position, enabling them to score three offensive touchdowns. Tech's average starting field position in that quarter was the Georgia 48-yard line, allowing for easy scores even for a struggling offense.

As with Georgia, Virginia Tech's kicking and special teams proved to have more success than either aspect of the offense. Virginia Tech kicker Brandon Pace scored a single 28-yard field goal late in the fourth quarter, and punter Nic Schmitt blasted four punts for a total of 195 yards, averaging 48.8 yards a punt. Pace's field goal helped to trigger a late-game rally by Virginia Tech, which had been stunned by a Georgia onside kick and several interceptions thrown by Glennon. Schmitt's long punts, meanwhile, denied Georgia good field position in the first half of the game. Only in the second half, when Glennon's interceptions allowed Georgia to start on the Tech side of the field, was the Georgia offense able to reach the end zone. In the first and second quarters, Georgia's average starting position was their own 19-yard line and own 26-yard line, respectively.

That starting field position proved a boon for the Virginia Tech defense, which only allowed 200 total yards in the game. Tech linebacker Vince Hall led the Hokies and all defensive players with 13 tackles in the game. Tech recorded one interception during the game, courtesy of Brenden Hill, who also made three tackles. Georgia's offensive line, despite starting only six scholarship offensive linemen, allowed just two sacks to the Virginia Tech defense. Chris Ellis and Noland Burchette each earned a single sack, accounting for a loss of 15 total yards.

== Postgame effects ==
The win over #14 Virginia Tech enabled the Bulldogs to break into the Top 25 rankings in the final college football poll of the season. Georgia was ranked #23 in the country thanks to its win over the Hokies, who dropped to #19 nationally following the loss. The loss snapped a six-game winning streak by Virginia Tech and ended the Hokies' bid at becoming just the fourth team in school history to win 11 games in a season. The 2006 Georgia Bulldogs, consequently, became the first team in school history to defeat three consecutive ranked teams. No. 5 Auburn, No. 16 Georgia Tech, and No. 14 Virginia Tech all fell to Georgia in November or December. The game and the tens of thousands of fans it attracted injected an estimated $35 million into the Atlanta area economy, mostly as a result of food, hotel, and other expenses incurred by visiting fans.

=== 2007 season ===
In August 2007, Frank Beamer closed team practices to outside observers for the first time in 20 years. He cited concerns about unknown individuals watching Virginia Tech practice in Atlanta before the Hokies' loss to Georgia, potentially leading to the defeat. During the 2007 season, Virginia Tech quarterback Sean Glennon was replaced as the Hokies' starter by freshman Tyrod Taylor, causing many pundits to point to the four interceptions Glennon threw in the Chick-fil-A Bowl as an example of his failure as a quarterback. Brian Mimbs, the former walk-on who kicked and recovered the onside kick that began Georgia's rally was named the Bulldogs' starting punter for the 2007 season, partially due to his performance in the Chick-fil-A Bowl.

At the end of the 2007 NCAA Division I FBS football season, both Georgia and Virginia Tech were named to Bowl Championship Series bowl games, indicating an increase over their 2006 performances. Georgia earned a bid to the 2008 Sugar Bowl in New Orleans, Louisiana against the Hawaii Warriors, who they defeated, 41–10. Virginia Tech, having won the 2007 ACC Championship Game, earned an automatic bid to the 2008 Orange Bowl in Miami, Florida, losing 24–21 to the Kansas Jayhawks.

== See also ==
- Glossary of American football
- 2006 NCAA Division I FBS football rankings
