= 2013–14 NCAA football bowl games =

- Season: 2013
- Regular season: August 29, 2013 – December 14, 2013
- Number of bowls: 35
- All-star games: 3
- Bowl games: December 21, 2013 – January 25, 2014
- National Championship: 2014 BCS National Championship
- Location of Championship: Rose Bowl; Pasadena, California
- Champions: Florida State
- Bowl Challenge Cup winner: SEC
Bowl record by conference
Conference	Bowls	Record	Number of teams in final AP poll
ACC	11	5–6 (0.455)	4
SEC	10	7–3 (0.700)	7
Pac-12	9	6–3 (0.667)	6
Big Ten	7	2–5 (0.286)	3
Big 12	6	3–3 (0.500)	3
Conference USA	6	3–3 (0.500)	0
Mountain West	6	3–3 (0.500)	0
American	5	2–3 (0.400)	1
MAC	5	0–5 (0.000)	0
Independents	3	2–1 (0.667)	1
Sun Belt	2	2–0 (1.000)	0

The 2013–14 NCAA football bowl games were a series of college football bowl games. They concluded the 2013 NCAA Division I FBS football season and included 35 team-competitive games and three all-star games (down from four as the Texas vs the Nation game was cancelled for this season). The games began on Saturday, December 21, 2013, and, aside from the all-star games, ended with the 2014 BCS National Championship at the Rose Bowl in Pasadena that was played on January 6, 2014.

The total of 35 team-competitive bowls was unchanged from the previous year. While bowl games had been the purview of only the very best teams for nearly a century, this was the eighth consecutive year that teams with non-winning seasons participated in bowl games. To fill the 70 available bowl slots, a total of eight teams (11% of all participants) with non-winning seasons participated in bowl games—all eight had a .500 (6–6) season.

== Schedule ==
The 2013–14 bowl season served as the last for the Bowl Championship Series (BCS) format. Starting in 2014–15, a new system, the College Football Playoff, was used.

The 2013–2014 bowl game schedule, with 70 teams to compete in 35 bowls, was announced in May 2013. All bowl game participants were selected by December 8, 2013.

Note: All times are EST (UTC−5). Rankings from final BCS poll.

=== Non-BCS games ===
Date	Game	Site	Television	Teams	Affiliations	Results
Dec. 21	New Mexico Bowl	University Stadium; University of New Mexico; Albuquerque, NM; 2:00 pm	ESPN	Colorado State Rams (7–6); Washington State Cougars (6–6)	MW; Pac-12	Colorado State 48; Washington State 45
Dec. 21	Las Vegas Bowl	Sam Boyd Stadium; University of Nevada, Las Vegas; Whitney, NV; 3:30 pm	ABC	#25 USC Trojans (9–4) #20 Fresno State Bulldogs (11–1)	Pac-12; MW	USC 45; Fresno State 20
Dec. 21	Famous Idaho Potato Bowl	Bronco Stadium; Boise, ID; 5:30 pm	ESPN	San Diego State Aztecs (7–5); Buffalo Bulls (8–4)	MW; MAC	San Diego State 49; Buffalo 24
Dec. 21	New Orleans Bowl	Mercedes-Benz Superdome; New Orleans, LA; 9:00 pm	ESPN	Louisiana–Lafayette Ragin' Cajuns (8–4); Tulane Green Wave (7–5)	Sun Belt; C-USA	Louisiana–Lafayette 24; Tulane 21
Dec. 23	Beef 'O' Brady's Bowl	Tropicana Field; St. Petersburg, FL; 2:00 pm	ESPN	East Carolina Pirates (9–3); Ohio Bobcats (7–5)	C-USA; MAC (Note: The American Athletic Conference would have its sixth team to this game, but only five teams were bowl-eligible.)	East Carolina 37; Ohio 20
Dec. 24	Hawai'i Bowl	Aloha Stadium; Honolulu, HI; 8:00 pm	ESPN	Oregon State Beavers (6–6); Boise State Broncos (8–4)	Pac-12 (Note: Conference USA was to have sent a team, but because of a lack of bowl eligible teams, the Pac-12 sent a team instead.); MW	Oregon State 38; Boise State 23
Dec. 26	Little Caesars Pizza Bowl	Ford Field; Detroit, MI; 6:00 pm	ESPN	Pittsburgh Panthers (6–6); Bowling Green Falcons (10–3)	ACC (Note: The Big Ten Conference would have had its eighth selection go to this bowl, but it had only 7 eligible teams. Therefore, the ACC sent a team instead.); MAC	Pittsburgh 30; Bowling Green 27
Dec. 26	Poinsettia Bowl	Qualcomm Stadium; San Diego, CA; 9:30 pm	ESPN	Utah State Aggies (8–5) #23 NIU Huskies (12–1)	MW; MAC (Note: Army would have been eligible, but had a losing record.)	Utah State 21; NIU 14
Dec. 27	Military Bowl	Navy–Marine Corps Memorial Stadium; Annapolis, MD; 2:30 pm	ESPN	Marshall Thundering Herd (9–4); Maryland Terrapins (7–5)	C-USA; ACC	Marshall 31; Maryland 20
Dec. 27	Texas Bowl	Reliant Stadium; Houston, TX; 6:00 pm	ESPN	Syracuse Orange (6–6); Minnesota Golden Gophers (8–4)	ACC; Big Ten	Syracuse 21; Minnesota 17
Dec. 27	Fight Hunger Bowl	AT&T Park; San Francisco, CA; 9:30 pm	ESPN	Washington Huskies (8–4); BYU Cougars (8–4)	Pac-12; Independent	Washington 31; BYU 16
Dec. 28	Pinstripe Bowl	Yankee Stadium; Bronx, NY; Noon	ESPN	Notre Dame Fighting Irish (8–4); Rutgers Scarlet Knights (6–6)	Independent (Note: The Big 12 Conference was supposed to send its seventh selection to the Pinstripe Bowl. However since only six Big 12 teams were eligible this year, its place will be taken by an at-large team.); American	Notre Dame 29; Rutgers 16
Dec. 28	Belk Bowl	Bank of America Stadium; Charlotte, NC; 3:20 pm	ESPN	North Carolina Tar Heels (6–6); Cincinnati Bearcats (9–3)	ACC; American	North Carolina 39; Cincinnati 17
Dec. 28	Russell Athletic Bowl	Florida Citrus Bowl Stadium; Orlando, FL; 6:45 pm	ESPN	#18 Louisville Cardinals (11–1); Miami Hurricanes (9–3)	American; ACC	Louisville 36; Miami 9
Dec. 28	Buffalo Wild Wings Bowl	Sun Devil Stadium; Arizona State University; Tempe, AZ; 10:15 pm	ESPN	Kansas State Wildcats (7–5); Michigan Wolverines (7–5)	Big 12; Big Ten	Kansas State 31; Michigan 14
Dec. 30	Armed Forces Bowl	Amon G. Carter Stadium; Texas Christian University; Fort Worth, TX; 11:45 am	ESPN	Navy Midshipmen (8–4); Middle Tennessee Blue Raiders (8–4)	Independent; C-USA	Navy 24; Middle Tennessee 6
Dec. 30	Music City Bowl	LP Field; Nashville, TN; 3:15 pm	ESPN	Ole Miss Rebels (7–5); Georgia Tech Yellow Jackets (7–5)	SEC; ACC	Ole Miss 25; Georgia Tech 17
Dec. 30	Alamo Bowl	Alamodome; San Antonio, TX; 6:45 pm	ESPN	#10 Oregon Ducks (10–2); Texas Longhorns (8–4)	Pac-12; Big 12	Oregon 30; Texas 7
Dec. 30	Holiday Bowl	Qualcomm Stadium; San Diego, CA; 10:15 pm	ESPN	Texas Tech Red Raiders (7–5) #14 Arizona State Sun Devils (10–3)	Big 12; Pac-12	Texas Tech 37; Arizona State 23
Dec. 31	AdvoCare V100 Bowl	Independence Stadium; Shreveport, LA; 12:30 pm	ESPN	Arizona Wildcats (7–5); Boston College Eagles (7–5)	Pac-12 (Note: With two SEC in the BCS, the Pac-12 replaces them.); ACC	Arizona 42; Boston College 19
Dec. 31	Sun Bowl	Sun Bowl Stadium; University of Texas El Paso; El Paso, TX; 2:00 pm	CBS	#17 UCLA Bruins (9–3); Virginia Tech Hokies (8–4)	Pac-12; ACC	UCLA 42; Virginia Tech 12
Dec. 31	Liberty Bowl	Liberty Bowl Memorial Stadium; Memphis, TN; 4:00 pm	ESPN	Mississippi State Bulldogs (6–6); Rice Owls (10–3)	SEC; C-USA	Mississippi State 44; Rice 7
Dec. 31	Chick-fil-A Bowl	Georgia Dome; Atlanta, GA; 8:00 pm	ESPN	#21 Texas A&M Aggies (8–4) #24 Duke Blue Devils (10–3)	SEC; ACC	Texas A&M 52; Duke 48
Jan. 1	Gator Bowl	EverBank Field; Jacksonville, FL; Noon	ESPN2	Nebraska Cornhuskers (8–4) #22 Georgia Bulldogs (8–4)	Big Ten; SEC	Nebraska 24; Georgia 19
Jan. 1	Heart of Dallas Bowl (Note: Neither the Big Ten nor Big 12 were able to fulfill their required bowl slots for this game.)	Cotton Bowl; Dallas, TX; Noon	ESPNU	North Texas Mean Green (8–4); UNLV Rebels (7–5)	C-USA; MW	North Texas 36; UNLV 14
Jan. 1	Capital One Bowl	Florida Citrus Bowl Stadium; Orlando, FL; 1:00 pm	ABC	#9 South Carolina Gamecocks (10–2) #19 Wisconsin Badgers (9–3)	SEC; Big Ten	South Carolina 34; Wisconsin 24
Jan. 1	Outback Bowl	Raymond James Stadium; Tampa, FL; 1:00 pm	ESPN	#16 LSU Tigers (9–3); Iowa Hawkeyes (8–4)	SEC; Big Ten	LSU 21; Iowa 14
Jan. 3	Cotton Bowl Classic	AT&T Stadium; Arlington, TX; 7:30 pm	FOX	#8 Missouri Tigers (11–2) #13 Oklahoma State Cowboys (10–2)	SEC; Big 12	Missouri 41; Oklahoma State 31
Jan. 4	BBVA Compass Bowl	Legion Field; Birmingham, AL; 1:00 pm	ESPN	Vanderbilt Commodores (8–4); Houston Cougars (8–4)	SEC; American	Vanderbilt 41; Houston 24
Jan. 5	GoDaddy Bowl	Ladd–Peebles Stadium; Mobile, AL; 9:00 pm	ESPN	Arkansas State Red Wolves (7–5); Ball State Cardinals (10–2)	Sun Belt; MAC	Arkansas State 23; Ball State 20

=== BCS Games ===
Date	Game	Site	Television	Teams	Affiliations	Results
Jan. 1	Rose Bowl	Rose Bowl; Pasadena, CA; 5:00 pm	ESPN	#4 Michigan State Spartans (12–1) #5 Stanford Cardinal (11–2)	Big Ten; Pac-12	Michigan State 24; Stanford 20
Jan. 1	Fiesta Bowl	University of Phoenix Stadium; Glendale, AZ; 8:30 pm	ESPN	#15 UCF Knights (11–1) #6 Baylor Bears (11–1)	American; Big 12	UCF 52; Baylor 42
Jan. 2	Sugar Bowl	Mercedes-Benz Superdome; New Orleans, LA; 8:30 pm	ESPN	#11 Oklahoma Sooners (10–2) #3 Alabama Crimson Tide (11–1)	Big 12; SEC	Oklahoma 45; Alabama 31
Jan. 3	Orange Bowl	Sun Life Stadium; Miami Gardens, FL; 8:30 pm	ESPN	#12 Clemson Tigers (10–2) #7 Ohio State Buckeyes (12–1)	ACC; Big Ten	Clemson 40; Ohio State 35
Jan. 6	BCS National Championship Game	Rose Bowl; Pasadena, CA; 8:30 pm	ESPN	#1 Florida State Seminoles (13–0) #2 Auburn Tigers (12–1)	ACC; SEC	Florida State 34; Auburn 31

=== Post BCS all-star games ===
Date	Game	Site	Television	Participants	Results
Jan. 11	Medal of Honor Bowl	Johnson Hagood Stadium; Charleston, SC; 2:00 pm	NBCSN	American Team vs. National Team	American 20; National 3
Jan. 18	East-West Shrine Game	Tropicana Field; St. Petersburg, FL; 4:00 pm	NFL Network	East Team vs. West Team	East 23; West 13
Jan. 18	NFLPA Collegiate Bowl	StubHub Center; Carson, CA; 6:00 pm	ESPN2	American Team vs. National Team	National 31; American 17
Jan. 25	Senior Bowl	Ladd–Peebles Stadium; Mobile, AL; 4:00 pm	NFL Network	North Team vs. South Team	South 20; North 10

== Bowl Challenge Cup standings ==
Conference	Total games	Wins	Losses	Pct.
Sun Belt *	2	2	0	1.000
SEC	10	7	3	.700
Independents	3	2	1	.667
Pac-12	9	6	3	.667
Big 12	6	3	3	.500
C-USA	6	3	3	.500
MW	6	3	3	.500
ACC	11	5	6	.455
American	5	2	3	.400
Big Ten	7	2	5	.286
MAC	5	0	5	.000

* Sun Belt does not meet minimum game requirement of three teams needed for a conference to be eligible.

== Selection of the teams ==
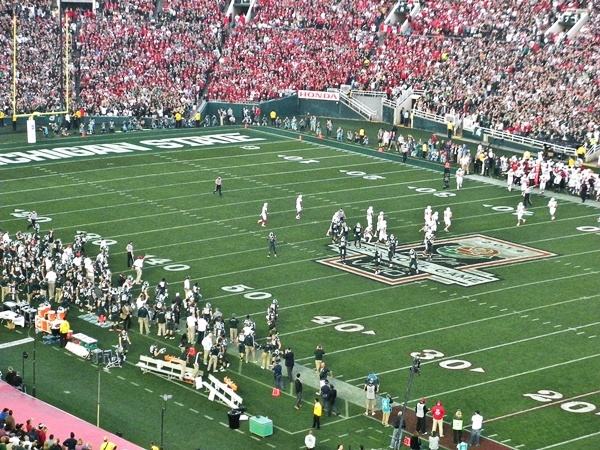
Michigan State defeated Stanford in the Rose Bowl Game

To play in a bowl game, a college football team must qualify to do so according to the NCAA rules of bowl eligibility.

As in the 2010, 2011, and 2012 seasons, initial bowl eligibility would go to teams with no lower than a non-losing record (6–6) for the season. On August 2, 2012, the NCAA Division I Board of Directors approved a significant change to the process to determine bowl eligible teams, going so far as to potentially allow 5–7 teams to go to a bowl, in case there were not enough regular bowl-eligible teams to fill every game.

The easing of the bowl eligibility rules resulted in a record number of teams, 79 versus the 71 or 72 of the past few seasons, being deemed eligible for selection to a 2013–14 bowl game. The easing of rules to include teams with losing records and teams from the lower Football Championship Subdivision (FCS), will carry extra importance starting in the 2014–15 bowl season, when the number of bowl games will increase to 39—requiring 78 eligible teams.

If a bowl has one or more conferences/teams unable to meet their contractual commitments and there are no available bowl-eligible teams, the open spots can be filled – by the particular bowl's sponsoring agencies – as follows:

1. Teams finishing with an above .500 record, that is, 7–5. In case of two teams with identical record, the team with a .500 or above in conference play, AND winning percentage in a) FIRST non-conference Road games against i) BCS conference opponents, ii) Division I non BCS conference opponents, b) SECOND non-conference Neutral-site games against iii) BCS conference opponents, iv) Division I non BCS conference opponents, c) THIRD non-conference Home games against v) BCS conference opponents, vi) Division I non BCS conference opponents, and last, games at home against lower division opponents.
2. Teams finishing 6–6 with one win against a team from the lower Football Championship Subdivision (FCS), regardless of whether that FCS school meets NCAA scholarship requirements. Until now, an FCS win counted only if that opponent met the scholarship requirements—specifically, that school had to award at least 90% of the FCS maximum of 63 scholarship equivalents over a two-year period. In the 2013 season, programs in four FCS conferences cannot meet the 90% requirement (56.7 equivalents)—the Ivy League, which prohibits all athletic scholarships; the Pioneer Football League, which does not currently award football scholarships; the Patriot League, which only began awarding football scholarships in the 2012 season and had a limit of 30 equivalents in the 2013 season; and the Northeast Conference, which limits football scholarships to 40 equivalents.
3. 6–6 teams with two wins over FCS schools.
4. 6–7 teams that normally play a 13-team schedule, such as Hawaii's home opponents. Although Hawaii normally plays a 13-game schedule, it is only playing 12 games this season.
5. FCS teams who are in the final year of the two-year FBS transition process, if they have at least a 6–6 record.
6. Finally, 5–7 teams that have a top-5 Academic Progress Rate (APR) score. This was later adjusted to allow other 5–7 teams to be selected thereafter—in order of their APR.

Under a rule change approved by the NCAA Legislative Council on May 3, 2013, teams that enter a conference championship game with a 6–6 record, with no more than one win over an FCS school, are bowl-eligible regardless of the result of the championship game, without the team having to seek an NCAA waiver.

=== Bowl Championship Series ===
Ten teams were selected for the Bowl Championship Series:

Conference Champions

- American: UCF
- ACC: Florida State
- Big 12: Baylor
- Big Ten: Michigan State
- Pac-12: Stanford
- SEC: Auburn

At-large selections

- Alabama (SEC)
- Clemson (ACC)
- Ohio State (Big Ten)
- Oklahoma (Big 12)

=== BCS top 25 teams ===
Rank	Team	Conference and standing	Bowl game
1	Florida State Seminoles	ACC champions	National Championship Game
2	Auburn Tigers	SEC champions	National Championship Game
3	Alabama Crimson Tide	SEC Western Division co-champions	Sugar Bowl
4	Michigan State Spartans	Big Ten champions	Rose Bowl
5	Stanford Cardinal	Pac-12 champions	Rose Bowl
6	Baylor Bears	Big 12 champions	Fiesta Bowl
7	Ohio State Buckeyes	Big Ten Leaders Division champions	Orange Bowl
8	Missouri Tigers	SEC Eastern Division champions	Cotton Bowl Classic
9	South Carolina Gamecocks	SEC Eastern Division second place	Capital One Bowl
10	Oregon Ducks	Pac-12 North Division co-champions	Alamo Bowl
11	Oklahoma Sooners	Big 12 second place (tie)	Sugar Bowl
12	Clemson Tigers	ACC Atlantic Division second place	Orange Bowl
13	Oklahoma State Cowboys	Big 12 second place (tie)	Cotton Bowl Classic
14	Arizona State Sun Devils	Pac-12 South Division champions	Holiday Bowl
15	UCF Knights	American champions	Fiesta Bowl
16	LSU Tigers	SEC Western Division third place	Outback Bowl
17	UCLA Bruins	Pac-12 South Division second place (tie)	Sun Bowl
18	Louisville Cardinals	American second place	Russell Athletic Bowl
19	Wisconsin Badgers	Big Ten Leaders Division second place	Capital One Bowl
20	Fresno State Bulldogs	MWC champions	Las Vegas Bowl
21	Texas A&M Aggies	SEC Western Division fourth place	Chick-fil-A Bowl
22	Georgia Bulldogs	SEC Eastern Division third place	Gator Bowl
23	NIU Huskies	MAC West Division champions	Poinsettia Bowl
24	Duke Blue Devils	ACC Coastal Division Champions	Chick-fil-A Bowl
25	USC Trojans	Pac-12 South Division second place (tie)	Las Vegas Bowl

=== Teams that became bowl eligible ===
- American (5) : Cincinnati, Houston, Louisville, UCF (Champions), Rutgers
- ACC (11) : Boston College, Clemson, Duke (ACC Coastal Division Champions), Florida State (ACC Atlantic Division Champions, Champions), Georgia Tech, Maryland, Miami (FL), North Carolina, Pittsburgh, Syracuse, Virginia Tech
- Big Ten (7) : Iowa, Michigan, Michigan State (Big Ten Legends Division Champions, Champions), Minnesota, Nebraska, Ohio State (Big Ten Leaders Division Champions), Wisconsin
- Big 12 (6) : Baylor (Champions), Kansas State, Oklahoma, Oklahoma State, Texas, Texas Tech
- Conference USA (7) : East Carolina, Florida Atlantic, Marshall (C-USA East Division Champions), Middle Tennessee, North Texas, Rice (Champions, C-USA West Division Champions), Tulane
- Independents (3) : BYU, Navy, Notre Dame
- MAC (7) : Ball State, Bowling Green (MAC East Division Champions, Champions), Buffalo, Central Michigan, NIU (MAC West Division Champions), Ohio, Toledo
- Mountain West (7) : Boise State, Colorado State, Fresno State (Mountain West West Division Champions, Champions), San Diego State, San Jose State, UNLV, Utah State (Mountain West Mountain Division Champions)
- Pac-12 (9) : Arizona, Arizona State (Pac-12 South Division Champions), Oregon (Pac-12 North Division Co-Champions), Oregon State, Stanford (Pac-12 North Division Co-Champions, Champions), UCLA, USC, Washington, Washington State
- SEC (10) : Alabama (SEC West Division Co-Champions), Auburn (SEC West Division Co-Champions, Champions), Georgia, LSU, Mississippi State, Missouri (SEC East Division Champions), Ole Miss, South Carolina, Texas A&M, Vanderbilt
- Sun Belt (7) : Arkansas State (Co-Champions), Louisiana–Lafayette (Co-Champions), Louisiana–Monroe, South Alabama, Texas State, Troy, Western Kentucky

Number of bowl berths available: 70
Number of teams bowl eligible: 79

The easing of the bowl eligibility rules, to include teams with non-losing (6–6) or even losing records, resulted in a record number of teams – 79 versus the 71 or 72 of the past few seasons – being deemed eligible for selection to a 2013–14 bowl game.

Nine eligible teams did not receive a bowl invitation, including two with winning records: Western Kentucky (8–4), Toledo (7–5), Central Michigan (6–6), Florida Atlantic (6–6), Louisiana-Monroe (6–6), San Jose State (6–6), South Alabama (6–6), Texas State (6–6), and Troy (6–6).

=== Teams that did not become bowl eligible ===
- American (5) : Connecticut, Memphis, South Florida, SMU, Temple
- ACC (3) : NC State, Virginia, Wake Forest
- Big Ten (5) : Illinois, Indiana, Northwestern, Penn State (via NCAA sanctions), Purdue
- Big 12 (4) : Iowa State, Kansas, TCU, West Virginia
- Conference USA (7) : FIU, Louisiana Tech, Southern Miss, Tulsa, UAB, UTEP, UTSA (via transition)
- Independents (3) : Army, Idaho, New Mexico State
- MAC (6) : Akron, Eastern Michigan, Kent State, Miami (OH), UMass, Western Michigan
- Mountain West (5) : Air Force, Hawaii, Nevada, New Mexico, Wyoming
- Pac-12 (3) : California, Colorado, Utah
- SEC (4) : Arkansas, Florida, Kentucky, Tennessee
- Sun Belt (1) : Georgia State

Number of teams bowl ineligible: 46

== Changes for 2014–15 ==
Starting in 2014–15, a new system, the College Football Playoff, has been used to determine the national champion.

The new format uses a committee of 13 people to select and seed the top 12 teams. These teams are paired in six of the ten oldest bowl games—the Rose, Sugar, Orange, Cotton, Peach and Fiesta bowls. These games have been marketed as the "New Year's Six", with three bowls played daily, typically on consecutive days around New Year's Day.

Within this New Year's Six format, the top four seeded teams are paired in two national semi-finals, followed by a national championship game played on the first Monday that is six or more days after the semifinals, at a neutral site. The two semi-finals will rotate each year, first at the Rose and Sugar bowls, then the Orange and Fiesta bowls, then the Cotton and Peach bowls.

In addition, the number of bowls expanded to 39 games in 2014–15, with four new games – the Camellia Bowl, scheduled for the Cramton Bowl in Montgomery, Alabama pitting the Sun Belt against the MAC; the Bahamas Bowl, played in Nassau between the MAC and the American Athletic Conference; the Miami Beach Bowl, played in Marlins Park with an AAC team as host; and the Boca Raton Bowl, played at FAU Stadium, with a third MAC team taking on a team from Conference USA. The increase to 76 teams (38 bowls + national championship played by semi-final bowl winners) in bowl play required the easing of bowl eligibility rules, allowing teams with losing records or teams in the lower FCS to be deemed eligible for invitation to a bowl game.
