= American Conference football individual awards =

Awards given at the conclusion of every season

The American Conference (American), known before July 2025 as the American Athletic Conference, gives five football awards at the conclusion of every season. The awards were first given in 2013, following the restructuring of the Big East Conference. The awards existed in the same format in the Big East from 1991 to 2012.

The five awards include Offensive Player of the Year, Defensive Player of the Year, Special Teams Player of the Year, Rookie of the Year, and Coach of the Year. Recipients are selected by the votes of the conference's head coaches.

== Offensive Player of the Year ==
The Offensive Player of the Year is awarded to the player voted most outstanding at an offensive position.

=== Winners ===
*	Unanimous selection
†	Co-winner
Player (X)	Denotes the number of times the player has been selected

Season	Player	Pos.	Team	Ref
2013	Blake Bortles	QB	UCF	
2014	Shane Carden	QB	East Carolina	
2015	Keenan Reynolds	QB	Navy	
2016	Quinton Flowers	QB	South Florida	
2017	McKenzie Milton	QB	UCF	
2018	McKenzie Milton (2)	QB	UCF	
2019	Malcolm Perry	QB	Navy	
2020	Desmond Ridder	QB	Cincinnati	
2021	Desmond Ridder (2)	QB	Cincinnati	
2022	Tyjae Spears	RB	Tulane	
2023	Michael Pratt	QB	Tulane	
2024	Bryson Daily	QB	Army	
2025	Drew Mestemaker	QB	North Texas	

=== Winners by school ===
School (Seasons)	Winners	Years
UCF (2013–2022)	3	2013, 2017, 2018
Cincinnati (2013–2022)	2	2020, 2021
Navy (2015–)	2	2015, 2019
Tulane (2014–)	2	2022, 2023
Army (2024–)	1	2024
East Carolina (2014–)	1	2014
North Texas (2023–)	1	2025
USF (2013–)	1	2016

== Defensive Player of the Year ==
The Defensive Player of the Year is awarded to the player voted most outstanding at a defensive position.

=== Winners ===
*	Unanimous selection
†	Co-winner

Season	Player	Pos.	Team	Ref
2013	Marcus Smith	DE	Louisville	
2014	Jacoby Glenn†	CB	UCF	
2014	Tank Jakes†	LB	Memphis	
2015	Tyler Matakevich	LB	Temple	
2016	Shaquem Griffin	LB	UCF	
2017	Ed Oliver	DT	Houston	
2018	Nate Harvey	DE	East Carolina	
2019	Quincy Roche	DE	Temple	
2020	Zaven Collins*	LB	Tulsa	
2021	Sauce Gardner*	CB	Cincinnati	
2022	Ivan Pace Jr.	LB	Cincinnati	
2023	Trey Moore	LB	UTSA	
2024	Jimmori Robinson	LB	UTSA	
2025	Landon Robinson	DT	Navy	

=== Winners by school ===
School (Seasons)	Winners	Years
Cincinnati (2013–2022)	2	2021, 2022
Temple (2013–)	2	2015, 2019
UCF (2013–2022)	2	2014, 2016
UTSA (2023–)	2	2023, 2024
East Carolina (2014–)	1	2018
Houston (2013–2022)	1	2017
Memphis (2013–)	1	2014
Navy (2015–)	1	2025
Louisville (2013)	1	2013
Tulsa (2014–)	1	2020

== Special Teams Player of the Year ==
The Special Teams Player of the Year award is given to the player voted best on special teams. The recipient can either be a placekicker, punter, returner, or a position known as a gunner.

=== Winners ===
*	Unanimous selection
†	Co-winner
Player (X)	Denotes the number of times the player has been selected

Season	Player	Pos.	Team	Ref
2013	Demarcus Ayers†	RS	Houston	
2013	Tom Hornsey†	P	Memphis	
2014	Jake Elliott	K	Memphis	
2015	Jake Elliott (2)	K	Memphis	
2016	Tony Pollard	KR	Memphis	
2017	Tony Pollard (2)	KR	Memphis	
2018	Isaiah Wright	RS	Temple	
2019	Dane Roy†	P	Houston	
2019	Antonio Gibson†	RS	Memphis	
2020	Chris Naggar	K	SMU	
2021	Marcus Jones	RS	Houston	
2022	Mason Fletcher	P	Cincinnati	
2023	LaJohntay Wester	RS	Florida Atlantic	
2024	Jonah Delange	K	UAB	
2025	Patrick Durkin	K	Tulane	

=== Winners by school ===
School (Seasons)	Winners	Years
Memphis (2013–)	6	2013, 2014, 2015, 2016, 2017, 2019
Houston (2013–2022)	3	2013, 2019, 2021
Cincinnati (2013–2022)	1	2022
Florida Atlantic (2023–)	1	2023
SMU (2013–)	1	2020
Temple (2013–)	1	2018
Tulane (2014–)	1	2025
UTSA (2023–)	1	2024

== Rookie of the Year ==
The Rookie of the Year award is given to the conference's best freshman.

=== Winners ===
*	Unanimous selection
†	Co-winner

Season	Player	Pos.	Team	Ref
2013	John O'Korn	QB	Houston	
2014	Marlon Mack	RB	South Florida	
2015	Tre'Quan Smith	WR	UCF	
2016	Ed Oliver	DT	Houston	
2017	T. J. Carter	CB	Memphis	
2018	Desmond Ridder	QB	Cincinnati	
2019	Kenneth Gainwell	RB	Memphis	
2020	Rahjai Harris†	RB	East Carolina	
2020	Ulysses Bentley IV	RB	SMU	
2021	Alton McCaskill	RB	Houston	
2022	E. J. Warner	QB	Temple	
2023	Makhi Hughes	RB	Tulane	
2024	Joseph Williams	WR	Tulsa	
2025	Caleb Hawkins	RB	North Texas	

=== Winners by school ===
School (Seasons)	Winners	Years
Houston (2013–2022)	3	2013, 2016, 2021
Memphis (2013–)	2	2017, 2019
Cincinnati (2013–2022)	1	2018
East Carolina (2014–)	1	2020
North Texas (2023–)	1	2025
SMU (2013–)	1	2020
Temple (2013–)	1	2022
Tulane (2014–)	1	2023
Tulsa (2014–)	1	2024
USF (2013–)	1	2014
UCF (2013–2022)	1	2015

== Coach of the Year ==
George O'Leary won the first award with UCF after an 11–1 regular season in which UCF earned The American's last automatic berth to a BCS bowl game, the first major bowl appearance in school history.

=== Winners ===
Records reflect those at the time of selection, and do not include the conference championship game, the Army–Navy Game (which takes place a week after the conference title game), or bowl games.

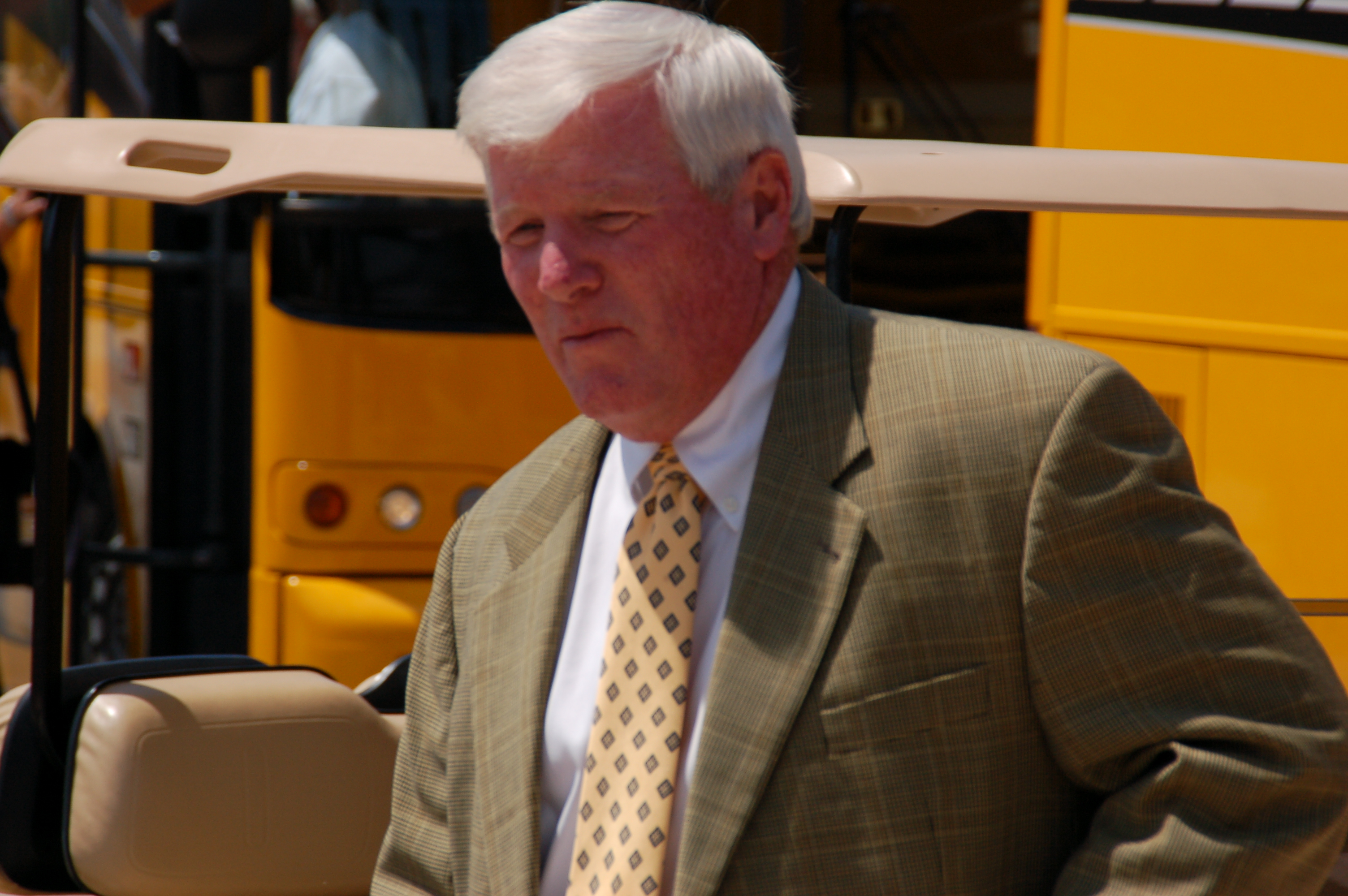
George O'Leary, the 2013 winner

*	Unanimous selection
^{†}	Co-Coach of the Year
Coach (X)	Denotes the number of times the coach has been selected

Season	Coach	School	Year with school	Record
2013	George O'Leary	UCF	10th	11–1
2014	Justin Fuente	Memphis	3rd	9–3
2015^{†}	Tom Herman	Houston	1st	11–1
2015^{†}	Ken Niumatalolo	Navy	8th	9–2
2016	Ken Niumatalolo (2)	Navy	9th	9–2
2017	Scott Frost	UCF	2nd	12–0
2018	Luke Fickell	Cincinnati	2nd	11–2
2019	Ken Niumatalolo (3)	Navy	12th	11–2
2020	Luke Fickell (2)	Cincinnati	4th	9–1
2021	Luke Fickell (3)	Cincinnati	5th	12–0
2022	Willie Fritz	Tulane	7th	10–2
2023	Willie Fritz	Tulane	8th	11–1
2024	Jeff Monken	Army	11th	10–1
2025	Eric Morris	North Texas	3rd	11–1

=== Winners by school ===
School (Seasons)	Winners	Years
Cincinnati (2013–2022)	3	2018, 2020, 2021
Navy (2015–)	3	2015, 2016, 2019
Tulane (2014–)	2	2022, 2023
UCF (2013–2022)	2	2013, 2017
Army (2024–)	1	2024
Houston (2013–2022)	1	2015
Memphis (2013–)	1	2014
North Texas (2023–)	1	2025

== Footnotes ==
- ^{a} Louisville left The American for the Atlantic Coast Conference (ACC) after 2013.
