= DeVante Parker =

American football player (born 1993)

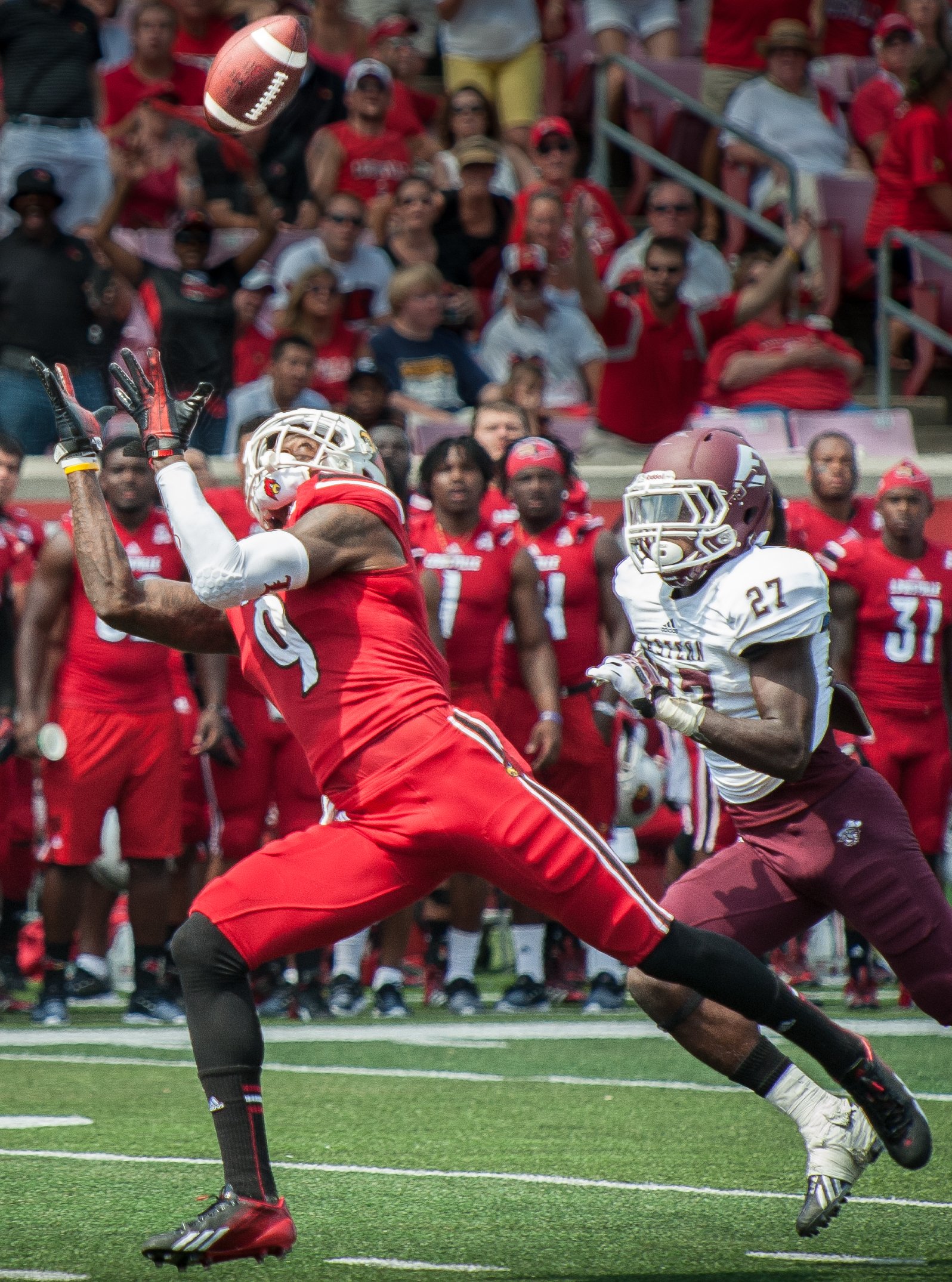
- Parker at Louisville in 2013

No. 11, 1
- Position: Wide receiver

Personal information
- Born: January 20, 1993 (age 33); Louisville, Kentucky, U.S.
- Listed height: 6 ft 3 in (1.91 m)
- Listed weight: 215 lb (98 kg)

Career information
- High school: Ballard (Louisville)
- College: Louisville (2011–2014)
- NFL draft: 2015: 1st round, 14th overall pick

Career history
- Miami Dolphins (2015–2021); New England Patriots (2022–2023); Philadelphia Eagles (2024)*
- * Offseason or practice squad member only

Awards and highlights
- First-team All-AAC (2013); First-team All-Big East (2012); Second-team All-ACC (2014)

Career NFL statistics
- Receptions: 402
- Receiving yards: 5,660
- Receiving touchdowns: 27
- Stats at Pro Football Reference

DeVante Parker (born January 20, 1993) is an American former professional football player who was a wide receiver for nine seasons in the National Football League (NFL). He played college football for the Louisville Cardinals and was selected by the Miami Dolphins in the first round of the 2015 NFL draft with the 14th overall pick. He played with the New England Patriots in 2022 and 2023.

== Early life ==
Parker is the son of Raneca Parker and former Louisville running back Anthony Shelman. He attended Ballard High School in Louisville, Kentucky, where he was a three-sport star in football, track and basketball. He was a two-time All-State performer. He totaled 73 catches for 1,438 yards and 12 touchdowns as a junior. He was named first-team All-State by The Courier-Journal. He recorded 209 yards and one touchdown against 6-A state champion Trinity, 137 and two touchdowns and 184 and two touchdowns in two games against No. 2 St. Xavier, 321 yards and two touchdowns against 6-A finalist Male and 227 yards and three touchdowns in just three quarters against 3-A state champion Central. He was named co-Paul Hornung Award winner as the state's top player with Boyle County's Lamar Dawson. He hauled in 68 passes for 1,793 yards (26.4 yards a catch) and 19 touchdowns as a senior, that ranks fourth all-time in state history. He finished his career as one of the state's all-time leading wide receivers with 3,274 yards, which ranks fifth only behind Somerset's John Cole (4,981), Lawrence County's Gerad Parker (4,736), Male's Montrell Jones (4,345) and Mason County's Chris Lofton (3,511).

In track & field, Parker lettered all four years for the Bruins competing as a sprinter. He earned a third-place finish in the 100-meter dash at the 2011 Male All Comers Meet, recording a personal-best time of 11.18 seconds. At the 2011 Class 3A Region 4 Championship, he posted a career-best time of 22.57 seconds in the 200-meter dash, placing 3rd, while also helping his 4 × 100 relay rank top in the state until defeated by rival Louisville Eastern High School at regionals and 4 × 200 relay squad placed first.

Parker was rated as the 26th-best wide receiver in the nation by Scout.com. He was ranked as the 77th-best wide receiver nationally by Rivals.com and the fifth-best player in the Rivals.com Kentucky postseason top 10. Parker chose Louisville over scholarship offers from Kentucky, Indiana and UCF.

== College career ==
As a true freshman at the University of Louisville in 2011, Parker appeared in 11 games. He finished sixth on the team with 18 receptions for 291 yards and led the team in touchdowns with six. He had two receiving touchdowns at USF. He also made a highlight-reel 39-yard touchdown reception in the season-opening win versus Murray State.

As a sophomore in 2012, Parker played in all 13 games and led the team with 744 receiving yards and 10 touchdowns on 40 receptions. His 10 touchdown receptions were the most by a player in a season since 1998. He had a touchdown in six straight games to end the season. He had two games with two receiving touchdowns. He finished the season with two 100-yard-receiving games. He hauled in a 75-yard touchdown reception to start the second half of the Pittsburgh game.

As a junior in 2013, Parker played in 12 of 13 games and had 55 receptions for 885 yards and a school record-tying 12 touchdowns. His 12 touchdowns were tied for 10th nationally and led the American Athletic Conference. He recorded three 100-yard-receiving games. He tied a career-high with nine receptions for 142 yards and one touchdown in the Russell Bowl win over Miami. He had a career-best nine catches for 104 yards and two touchdowns in a road win over No. 23 Cincinnati. He finished with five catches for 71 yards and a score at Connecticut. He had two scoring catches and six catches overall for 74 yards against FIU. He had a season-high 134 yards receiving on five receptions and a pair of touchdowns against Eastern Kentucky.

Parker missed the first seven games of his senior season in 2014 with an injury. He played in six games, recording 43 receptions for 855 yards and five touchdowns.

== Professional career ==
Pre-draft measurables
Height	Weight	Arm length	Hand span	40-yard dash	10-yard split	20-yard split	Vertical jump	Broad jump	Bench press	Wonderlic
6 ft 2 5/8 in (1.90 m)	209 lb (95 kg)	33 1/4 in (0.84 m)	9 1/4 in (0.23 m)	4.45 s	1.51 s	2.61 s	36.5 in (0.93 m)	10 ft 5 in (3.18 m)	17 reps	15
All values from NFL Combine

=== Miami Dolphins ===
Parker was selected by the Miami Dolphins in the first round with the 14th overall pick in the 2015 NFL draft. As a rookie, he appeared in 15 games with four starts. In Week 12, against the New York Jets, he had his first professional receiving touchdown on a 33-yard reception from quarterback Ryan Tannehill. In the regular season finale, he posted five receptions for 106 receiving yards and a receiving touchdown against the New England Patriots. Parker finished the season with 26 receptions for 494 receiving yards and three receiving touchdowns.

In 2016, Parker started off his second professional season strong with eight receptions for 106 receiving yards against the Patriots in Week 2. Overall, he finished the season with 56 receptions for 744 receiving yards and four receiving touchdowns. Parker made his playoff debut in the Wild Card Round against the Pittsburgh Steelers, recording four receptions for 55 receiving yards in the 30–12 loss.

In the 2017 season, Parker appeared in 13 games and started in all but one. He totaled 57 receptions for 670 receiving yards and one receiving touchdown.

On April 24, 2018, the Dolphins picked up the fifth-year option on Parker's contract. He had six receptions for a career-high 134 receiving yards in a loss to the Houston Texans in Week 8. In 11 games, Parker totaled 24 receptions for 309 receiving yards and one receiving touchdown.

On December 9, 2018, Parker was directly involved in the Miracle in Miami. With the Dolphins trailing the eventual Super Bowl LIII champion New England Patriots 33–28 in the final seconds of regulation, after Parker received a lateral from Kenny Stills, who was the initial receiver on the forward pass from quarterback Ryan Tannehill, Parker subsequently executed a second and final lateral pass to Kenyan Drake, who then ran the ball 52 yards to the end zone for the game-winning touchdown as time expired for a 34-33 Miami victory.

On March 12, 2019, Parker signed a new two-year contract with the Dolphins through the 2020 season. In Week 4 against the Los Angeles Chargers, Parker caught four passes for 70 yards and one receiving touchdown in the 30–10 loss. In Week 11 against the Buffalo Bills, Parker caught seven passes for 135 yards in the 37–20 loss. In Week 13 against the Philadelphia Eagles, Parker caught seven passes for 159 yards and two touchdowns in the 37–31 win. On December 13, 2019, Parker signed a four-year, $40 million contract extension with the Dolphins. In Week 16 against the Cincinnati Bengals, Parker caught five passes for 111 yards and a touchdown during the 38–35 overtime win. In Week 17 against the Patriots, Parker caught eight passes for 137 yards during the 27–24 win. Overall in 2019, Parker had his most productive season to date, making 72 receptions for 1,202 receiving yards and nine receiving touchdowns (all career-highs).

In Week 4 of the 2020 season against the Seattle Seahawks, Parker recorded ten catches for 110 yards during the 31–23 loss. In Week 8 against the Los Angeles Rams, Parker caught the first career touchdown pass thrown by rookie quarterback Tua Tagovailoa during the 28–17 win. In Week 12 against the Jets, he had eight receptions for 119 receiving yards in the 20–3 victory. In Week 13 against the Bengals, Parker was ejected from the game after fighting Bengals players. He appeared in 14 games that season, recording 63 receptions for 793 receiving yards and four receiving touchdowns.

On November 5, 2021, Parker was placed on injured reserve with a hamstring injury. He was activated on December 4. In the 2021 season, Parker appeared in ten games and recorded 40 receptions for 515 receiving yards and two receiving touchdowns.

=== New England Patriots ===
On April 5, 2022, Parker was traded to the Patriots, along with a 2022 fifth-round pick, in exchange for a 2023 third-round pick. In Week 3, against the Baltimore Ravens, Parker had five receptions for 156 receiving yards in the 37–26 loss. In the following game, Parker scored his first touchdown as a Patriot in the 27–24 overtime loss to the Green Bay Packers. He finished the season with 31 receptions for 539 receiving yards and three receiving touchdowns through 13 games.

On June 28, 2023, Parker signed a contract extension with the Patriots. In the 2023 season, Parker appeared in and started 13 games. He finished with 33 receptions for 394 yards.

Parker was released by the Patriots on March 14, 2024.

=== Philadelphia Eagles ===
On March 14, 2024, Parker signed a one-year contract with the Philadelphia Eagles. However, on May 20, Parker announced his retirement from football after nine seasons.

== Career statistics ==
=== NFL ===
Legend
**Bold**	Career high

==== Regular season ====
Year	Team	Games		Receiving						Fumbles	
Year	Team	GP	GS	Tgt	Rec	Yds	Avg	Lng	TD	Fum	Lost
2015	MIA	14	4	50	26	494	**19.0**	49	3	0	0
2016	MIA	15	8	87	56	744	13.8	**56**	4	0	0
2017	MIA	13	12	96	57	670	11.3	36	1	**1**	0
2018	MIA	11	7	47	24	309	12.9	46	1	0	0
2019	MIA	**16**	**14**	**128**	**72**	**1,202**	16.7	51	**9**	0	0
2020	MIA	14	11	103	63	793	12.6	31	4	**1**	0
2021	MIA	10	8	73	40	515	12.9	42	2	0	0
2022	NE	13	11	47	31	539	17.4	43	3	0	0
2023	NE	13	13	55	33	394	11.9	30	0	0	0
Career		106	75	631	369	5,266	14.3	56	27	2	0

==== Postseason ====
Year	Team	Games		Receiving						Fumbles	
Year	Team	GP	GS	Tgt	Rec	Yds	Avg	Lng	TD	Fum	Lost
2016	MIA	**1**	**0**	**6**	**4**	**55**	**13.8**	**37**	**0**	**0**	**0**
Career		1	0	6	4	55	13.8	37	0	0	0

=== College ===
Year	Team	Games		Receiving					
Year	Team	GP	GS	Rec	Yds	Avg	Lng	TD	Y/G
2011	Louisville	13	9	18	291	16.2	42	6	32.3
2012	Louisville	13	12	40	744	18.6	75	10	62.0
2013	Louisville	13	12	55	885	16.1	54	12	73.8
2014	Louisville	6	6	43	855	19.9	71	5	142.5
Career		45	39	156	2,775	17.7	73	33	77.7
