= 2014 NCAA football bowl games =

In college football, 2014 NCAA football bowl games may refer to:

- 2013–14 NCAA football bowl games, for games played in January 2014 as part of the 2013 season.
- 2014–15 NCAA football bowl games, for games played in December 2014 as part of the 2014 season.
