= 2013 American Athletic Conference football season =

- League: NCAA Division I FBS (Football Bowl Subdivision)
- Sport: Football
- Duration: August 29, 2013 through January 1, 2014
- Teams: 10
- TV partner: ESPN

2014 NFL Draft
- Top draft pick: Blake Bortles (UCF)
- Picked by: Jacksonville Jaguars, 3rd overall

Regular season
- Champion: UCF

Football seasons
- 2012 (Big East) 2014

2013 American Athletic Conference football standings
	Conf.			Overall
Team	W		L	W		L
No. 10 UCF $	8	–	0	12	–	1
No. 15 Louisville	7	–	1	12	–	1
Cincinnati	6	–	2	9	–	4
Houston	5	–	3	8	–	5
SMU	4	–	4	5	–	7
Rutgers	3	–	5	6	–	7
UConn	3	–	5	3	–	9
South Florida	2	–	6	2	–	10
Memphis	1	–	7	3	–	9
Temple	1	–	7	2	–	10
$ – BCS representative as conference champion; Rankings from AP Poll

The 2013 American Athletic Conference football season was the 23rd NCAA Division I FBS football season of the American Athletic Conference (The American). The season was the first after the breakup of the former Big East Conference, which lasted in its original form from its creation in 1979 until July 2013. The charter of the former Big East was retained by The American, henceforth the legal status as the 23rd season overall.

UCF as The American's Champion earned the league's last automatic berth for a BCS Bowl Game. Following the 2013 college football season, the BCS (1998–2013) was replaced by a four team playoff system. Starting in 2014, The American lost its Automatic Qualifier (AQ) status, and fall into the "Group of Five" with Conference USA, the Mid-American Conference, Mountain West Conference, and the Sun Belt Conference.

In its first year, the conference consisted of 10 football members: Cincinnati, Connecticut, Houston, Louisville, Memphis, Rutgers, SMU, South Florida, Temple, and UCF. Conference members began regular-season play on August 29 when UCF hosted Akron. Conference play started on September 7 when Temple hosted Houston. The regular season concluded on December 7. The following match-ups were not seen in conference play in 2013: Cincinnati–UCF, Connecticut–Houston, Louisville–SMU, Memphis–Rutgers, and South Florida–Temple. Louisville–SMU and Memphis–Rutgers will not be seen in any year in The American play as Louisville and Rutgers are leaving for the ACC and Big Ten, respectively, in 2014.

== Previous season ==
On February 28, 2013, ESPN reported that the conference's seven schools that did not play FBS football, which had announced plans to leave the conference as a bloc no later than July 2015, had reached an agreement to leave in July 2013, and would keep the "Big East" name when they formed a new conference at that time. As a result, the football schools retained the original Big East charter and would operate under a new name in the 2013 football season. The new conference name was officially announced on April 3, 2013.

Cincinnati, Louisville, Rutgers, and Syracuse were co-champions with identical 5–2 records. Louisville received the Big East BCS bid. As the Big East BCS representative, the Cardinals defeated Florida 33–23 in the 2013 Allstate Sugar Bowl. In other bowl games, Cincinnati defeated Duke 48–34 in the Belk Bowl 48–34 with interim coach Steve Stripling. Rutgers lost to Virginia Tech 13–10 in the Russell Athletic Bowl, while Syracuse in their final game as a Big East member defeated former Big East member West Virginia 38–14 in the Pinstripe Bowl. In Pittsburgh's final game as a Big East member, the Panthers lost to Ole Miss 38–17 in the BBVA Compass Bowl.

== Preseason ==
=== Coaching changes ===
Three teams have new head coaches for the 2013 season. Tommy Tuberville replaces Butch Jones at Cincinnati, Willie Taggart replaces Skip Holtz at South Florida and Matt Rhule has taken over for Steve Addazio at Temple.

=== Preseason Poll ===
The 2013 American Athletic Conference Preseason Poll was announced at the 2013 American Athletic Conference Media Day in Newport, Rhode Island on July 30, 2013.

1. Louisville (28)
2. Cincinnati (2)
3. Rutgers
4. UCF
5. South Florida
6. Houston
7. UConn
8. SMU
9. Temple
10. Memphis
- (first place votes)

== Rankings ==
Legend
	Increase in ranking
	Decrease in ranking
	Not ranked previous week
RV	Received votes but were not ranked in Top 25 of poll

		Pre	Wk 2	Wk 3	Wk 4	Wk 5	Wk 6	Wk 7	Wk 8	Wk 9	Wk 10	Wk 11	Wk 12	Wk 13	Wk 14	Wk 15	Wk 16	Final
Cincinnati	AP	RV	RV	NR										RV	RV	RV	RV	NR
Cincinnati	C	RV	RV	NR			RV	NR					RV	RV	25	23	RV	RV
Cincinnati	Harris	Not released												RV	RV	RV	RV	
Cincinnati	BCS	Not released																
Connecticut	AP																	
Connecticut	C																	
Connecticut	Harris	Not released																
Connecticut	BCS	Not released																
Houston	AP								RV	NR		RV	RV	NR				
Houston	C								RV	RV	RV	RV	NR					
Houston	Harris	Not released							RV	RV	RV	RV	RV	NR				
Houston	BCS	Not released																
Louisville	AP	9	8	7	7	7	7	8	8	18	20	20	19	21	21	19	18	15
Louisville	C	9	8	7	6	7	8	8	6	16	17	16	13	15	16	16	16	15
Louisville	Harris	Not released							6	16	16	16	14	16	18	17	16	
Louisville	BCS	Not released								20	19	20	20	21	20	19	18	
Memphis	AP																	
Memphis	C																	
Memphis	Harris	Not released																
Memphis	BCS	Not released																
Rutgers	AP					RV	RV	RV	RV	NR								
Rutgers	C	RV	NR	RV	RV	RV	RV	RV	NR	RV	NR							
Rutgers	Harris	Not released																
Rutgers	BCS	Not released																
SMU	AP																	
SMU	C																	
SMU	Harris	Not released																
SMU	BCS	Not released																
South Florida	AP																	
South Florida	C																	
South Florida	Harris	Not released																
South Florida	BCS	Not released																
Temple	AP																	
Temple	C																	
Temple	Harris	Not released																
Temple	BCS	Not released																
UCF	AP				RV	RV	RV	RV	RV	21	19	19	15	17	17	15	15	10
UCF	C	RV	RV	RV	RV	RV	RV	RV	RV	25	22	21	19	20	19	17	15	12
UCF	Harris	Not released							RV	25	22	21	20	19	20	18	15	
UCF	BCS	Not released								23	23	21	17	18	19	16	15	

== Schedule ==
Index to colors and formatting
American member won
American member lost
American teams in **bold**

=== Week 1 ===
Date	Time	Visiting team	Home team	Site	TV	Result	Attendance	Ref.
August 29	7:00 p.m.	Akron	**UCF**	Bright House Networks Stadium • Orlando, FL	ESPN3	**W** 38–7	35,115	
August 29	7:30 p.m.	Towson	**Connecticut**	Rentschler Field • East Hartford, CT	ESPN3	**L** 33-18	30,689	
August 29	10:00 p.m.	**Rutgers**	Fresno State	Bulldog Stadium • Fresno, CA	ESPNU	**L** 52-51 ^{OT}	33,098	
August 30	8:00 pm	Texas Tech	**SMU**	Gerald J. Ford Stadium • Dallas, TX	ESPN	**L** 43-21	34,790	
August 30	8:30 p.m.	Southern	**Houston**	Reliant Stadium • Houston, TX	ESPN3	**W** 62–13	26,205	
August 31	12:00 p.m.	Purdue	**Cincinnati**	Nippert Stadium • Cincinnati, OH	ESPNU	**W** 42-7	36,007	
August 31	3:30 p.m.	**Temple**	No. 14 Notre Dame	Notre Dame Stadium • South Bend, IN	NBC	**L** 28-6	80,795	
August 31	7:00 p.m.	McNeese State	**South Florida**	Raymond James Stadium • Tampa, FL	ESPN3	**L** 53-21	35,470	
September 1	3:30 p.m.	Ohio	No. 9 **Louisville**	Papa John's Cardinal Stadium • Louisville, KY	ESPN	**W** 49-7	55,332	
^{#}Rankings from AP Poll released prior to game. All times are in Eastern Time.

Bye Week: Memphis

=== Week 2 ===
Date	Time	Visiting team	Home team	Site	TV	Result	Attendance	Ref.
September 6	8:00 pm	**UCF**	FIU	FIU Stadium • Miami, FL	CBSSN	**W** 38–0	15,823	
September 7	12:00 pm	**Cincinnati**	Illinois	Memorial Stadium • Champaign, IL	ESPN2	**L** 17–45	43,031	
September 7	12:00 pm	**South Florida**	Michigan State	Spartan Stadium • East Lansing, MI	ESPNU	**L** 6–21	70,401	
September 7	12:00 p.m.	**Houston**	**Temple**	Lincoln Financial Field • Philadelphia, PA	American Athletic Network	**HOU** 22–13	27,328	
September 7	12:00 p.m.	Norfolk State	**Rutgers**	High Point Solutions Stadium • Piscataway, NJ	CBSSN	**W** 0–38	49,111	
September 7	12:00 p.m.	Eastern Kentucky	#8 **Louisville**	Papa John's Cardinal Stadium • Louisville, KY	ESPN3	**W** 7–44	53,647	
September 7	4:30 p.m.	Duke	**Memphis**	Liberty Bowl Memorial Stadium • Memphis, TN	ESPN3	**L** 28–14	44,237	
September 7	8:00 p.m.	Montana State	**SMU**	Gerald J. Ford Stadium • Dallas, TX	ESPN3	**W** 30–31	10,107	
^{#}Rankings from AP Poll released prior to game. All times are in Eastern Time.

Bye Week: Connecticut

=== Week 3 ===
Date	Time	Visiting team	Home team	Site	TV	Result	Attendance	Ref.
September 14	12:00 p.m.	**#7 Louisville**	Kentucky	Commonwealth Stadium • Lexington, KY (Battle for the Governor's Cup)	ESPN	**W** 27–13	65,445	
September 14	1:00 p.m.	Eastern Michigan	**Rutgers**	High Point Solutions Stadium • Piscataway, NJ	ESPN3	**W** 28–10	47,604	
September 14	1:00 p.m.	Fordham	**Temple**	Lincoln Financial Field • Philadelphia, PA	ESPN3	**L** 30–29	20,047	
September 14	6:00 p.m.	**UCF**	Penn State	Beaver Stadium • University Park, PA	Big Ten Network	**W** 34–31	92,855	
September 14	7:00 p.m.	Northwestern State	**Cincinnati**	Nippert Stadium • Cincinnati, OH	ESPN3	**W** 9–66	30,384	
September 14	7:00 p.m.	Florida Atlantic	**South Florida**	Raymond James Stadium • Tampa, FL	ESPN3	**L** 28–10	33,792	
September 14	7:30 p.m.	Maryland	**Connecticut**	Rentschler Field • East Hartford, CT	ESPN3	**L** 32–21	38,916	
September 14	8:00 p.m.	**Memphis**	Middle Tennessee	Johnny "Red" Floyd Stadium • Murfreesboro, TN	CSS	**L** 15–17	23,992	
^{#}Rankings from AP Poll released prior to game. All times are in Eastern Time.

Bye Week: Houston, SMU

=== Week 4 ===
Date	Time	Visiting team	Home team	Site	TV	Result	Attendance	Ref.
September 21	8:00 p.m.	No. 15 Michigan	**Connecticut**	Rentschler Field • East Hartford, CT	ABC	**L** 24–21	42,704	
September 21	4:00 p.m.	**Cincinnati**	Miami (OH)	Yager Stadium • Oxford, OH (Battle for the Victory Bell)	ESPN3	**W** 14–0	21,269	
September 21	3:00 p.m.	**Houston**	Rice	Reliant Stadium • Houston, TX (rivalry)	FSN	**W** 31–26	34,831	
September 21	7:00 p.m.	**SMU**	Texas A&M	Kyle Field • College Station, TX	ESPNU	**L** 42–13	86,542	
September 21	3:30 p.m.	Arkansas	**Rutgers**	High Point Solutions Stadium • Piscataway, NJ	ESPN	**W** 28–24	51,969	
September 21	4:30 p.m.	Arkansas State	**Memphis**	Liberty Bowl Memorial Stadium • Memphis, TN	ESPN3	**W** 31–7	36,279	
September 21	12:00 p.m.	FIU	**#7 Louisville**	Papa John's Cardinal Stadium • Louisville, KY	American Athletic Network	**W** 72–0	51,586	
^{#}Rankings from AP Poll released prior to game. All times are in Eastern Time.

Bye Week: Temple, South Florida, UCF

=== Week 5 ===
Date	Time	Visiting team	Home team	Site	TV	Result	Attendance	Ref.
September 28	12:00 p.m.	South Carolina	**UCF**	Bright House Networks Stadium • Orlando, FL	ABC	**L** 28–25	47,605	
September 28	12:00 p.m.	Miami	**South Florida**	Raymond James Stadium • Tampa, FL	ESPNU	**L** 49–21	47,562	
September 28	12:00 p.m.	**SMU**	TCU	Amon G. Carter Stadium • Fort Worth, TX	FS1	**L** 17–48	45,111	
September 28	3:30 p.m.	**Connecticut**	Buffalo	UB Stadium • Amherst, NY	ESPN3	**L** 12–41	20,952	
September 28	4:00 p.m.	**Houston**	UTSA	Alamodome • San Antonio, TX	FSN	**W** 59–28	32,487	
September 28	4:00 p.m.	**Temple**	Idaho	Kibbie Dome • Moscow, ID	Altitude	**L** 24–26	15,323	
^{#}Rankings from AP Poll released prior to game. All times are in Eastern Time.

Bye Week: Cincinnati, Louisville, Memphis, Rutgers

=== Week 6 ===
Date	Time	Visiting team	Home team	Site	TV	Result	Attendance	Ref.
October 5	12:00 p.m.	**#7 Louisville**	**Temple**	Lincoln Financial Field • Philadelphia, PA	American Athletic Network	**UL** 30-7	21,709	
October 5	12:00 p.m.	**Rutgers**	**SMU**	Gerald J. Ford Stadium • Dallas, TX	ESPNews	**RU** 55-52 ^{OT}	19,436	
October 5	4:30 p.m.	**UCF**	**Memphis**	Liberty Bowl Memorial Stadium • Memphis, TN	ESPN3	**UCF** 24-17	30,274	
October 5	7:00 p.m.	**Cincinnati**	**South Florida**	Raymond James Stadium • Tampa, FL	ESPN3	**USF** 26-20	31,077	
^{#}Rankings from AP Poll released prior to game. All times are in Eastern Time.

Bye Week: Connecticut, Houston

=== Week 7 ===
Date	Time	Visiting team	Home team	Site	TV	Result	Attendance	Ref.
October 10	7:30 p.m.	**Rutgers**	#8 **Louisville**	Papa John's Cardinal Stadium • Louisville, KY	ESPN	**UL** 24-10	55,168	
October 11	8:30 p.m.	**Temple**	**Cincinnati**	Nippert Stadium • Cincinnati, OH	ESPN	**CIN** 38-20	32,220	
October 12	12:00 p.m.	**Memphis**	**Houston**	BBVA Compass Stadium • Houston, TX	ESPNews	**HOU** 25–15	20,103	
October 12	12:00 p.m.	**South Florida**	**Connecticut**	Rentschler Field • East Hartford, CT	American Athletic Network	**USF** 13–10	37,861	
^{#}Rankings from AP Poll released prior to game. All times are in Eastern Time.

Bye Week: SMU, UCF

=== Week 8 ===
Date	Time	Visiting team	Home team	Site	TV	Result	Attendance	Ref.
October 18	8:00 p.m.	**UCF**	#8 **Louisville**	Papa John's Cardinal Stadium • Louisville, KY	ESPN	**UCF** 38–35	55,215	
October 19	12:00 p.m.	**Connecticut**	**Cincinnati**	Nippert Stadium • Cincinnati, OH	ESPNU	**CIN** 41–16	28,847	
October 19	12:00 p.m.	**SMU**	**Memphis**	Liberty Bowl Memorial Stadium • Memphis, TN	American Athletic Network	**SMU** 34–29	16,241	
October 19	1:00 p.m.	Army	**Temple**	Lincoln Financial Field • Philadelphia, PA	ESPN3	**W** 34–29	25,333	
October 19	3:30 p.m.	BYU	**Houston**	Reliant Stadium • Houston, TX	ESPNews	**L** 47–46	33,115	
^{#}Rankings from AP Poll released prior to game. All times are in Eastern Time.

Bye Week: Rutgers, South Florida

=== Week 9 ===
Date	Time	Visiting team	Home team	Site	TV	Result	Attendance	Ref.
October 26	12:00 p.m.	**Connecticut**	No. 21 **UCF**	Bright House Networks Stadium • Orlando, FL	American Athletic Network	**UCF** 62–17	37,924	
October 26	12:00 p.m.	**Houston**	**Rutgers**	High Point Solutions Stadium • Piscataway, NJ	ESPNews	**HOU** 49–14	52,200	
October 26	12:00 p.m.	No. 18 **Louisville**	**South Florida**	Raymond James Stadium • Tampa, FL	ESPN2	**LOU** 34–3	35,782	
October 26	3:00 p.m.	**Temple**	**SMU**	Gerald J. Ford Stadium • Dallas, TX	ESPN3	**SMU** 59–49	15,786	
^{#}Rankings from AP Poll released prior to game. All times are in Eastern Time.

Bye Week: Cincinnati, Memphis

=== Week 10 ===
Date	Time	Visiting team	Home team	Site	TV	Result	Attendance	Ref.
October 30	8:00 p.m.	**Cincinnati**	**Memphis**	Liberty Bowl Memorial Stadium • Memphis, TN	ESPN2	**CIN** 34–21	22,571	
October 31	7:00 p.m.	**South Florida**	**Houston**	Reliant Stadium • Houston, TX	ESPN	**HOU** 35–23	22,707	
November 2	12:00 p.m.	**Temple**	**Rutgers**	High Point Solutions Stadium • Piscataway, NJ	American Athletic Network	**RUT** 23–20	46,447	
^{#}Rankings from AP Poll released prior to game. All times are in Eastern Time.

Bye Week: Connecticut, Louisville, SMU, UCF

=== Week 11 ===
Date	Time	Visiting team	Home team	Site	TV	Result	Attendance	Ref.
November 8	8:30 p.m.	#20 **Louisville**	**Connecticut**	Rentschler Field • East Hartford, CT	ESPN2	**LOU** 31-10	27,104	
November 9	7:00 p.m.	**Houston**	#19 **UCF**	Bright House Networks Stadium • Orlando, FL	ESPN2	**UCF** 19-14	44,665	
November 9	12:00 p.m.	**SMU**	**Cincinnati**	Nippert Stadium • Cincinnati, OH	American Athletic Network	**CIN** 28-25	28,069	
November 9	3:30 p.m.	UT Martin	**Memphis**	Liberty Bowl Memorial Stadium • Memphis, TN	ESPN3	**MEM** 21-6	24,487	
^{#}Rankings from AP Poll released prior to game. All times are in Eastern Time.

Bye Week: Rutgers, South Florida

=== Week 12 ===
Date	Time	Visiting team	Home team	Site	TV	Result	Attendance	Ref.
November 16	12:00 p.m.	**Cincinnati**	**Rutgers**	High Point Solutions Stadium • Piscataway, NJ		**CIN** 52-17	40,870	
November 16	3:00p.m.	**Connecticut**	**SMU**	Gerald J. Ford Stadium • Dallas, TX		**SMU** 38-21	14,639	
November 16	7:00 p.m.	**Houston**	#19 **Louisville**	Papa John's Cardinal Stadium • Louisville, KY	ESPNU	**LOU** 20-13	53,027	
November 16	7:00 p.m.	**Memphis**	**South Florida**	Raymond James Stadium • Tampa, FL		**MEM** 23-10	30,831	
November 16	12:00 p.m.	#15 **UCF**	**Temple**	Lincoln Financial Field • Philadelphia, PA	American Athletic Network	**UCF** 39-36	20,174	
^{#}Rankings from AP Poll released prior to game. All times are in Eastern Time.

=== Week 13 ===
Date	Time	Visiting team	Home team	Site	TV	Result	Attendance	Ref.
November 21	7:30 p.m.	**Rutgers**	#17 **UCF**	Bright House Networks Stadium • Orlando, FL	ESPN	**UCF** 41-17	41,244	
November 23	12:00 p.m.	**Cincinnati**	**Houston**	Rice Stadium • Houston, TX	ESPNews	**CIN** 24-17	20,197	
November 23	7:00 p.m.	**Connecticut**	**Temple**	Lincoln Financial Field • Philadelphia, PA		**CONN** 28-21	20,045	
November 23	12:00 p.m.	**Memphis**	#21 **Louisville**	Papa John's Cardinal Stadium • Louisville, KY	American Athletic Network	**LOU** 24-17	46,421	
November 23	7:00 p.m.	**SMU**	**South Florida**	Raymond James Stadium • Tampa, FL		**SMU** 16-6	28,397	
^{#}Rankings from AP Poll released prior to game. All times are in Eastern Time.

=== Week 14 ===
Date	Time	Visiting team	Home team	Site	TV	Result	Attendance	Ref.
November 29	8:00 p.m.	**South Florida**	#17 **UCF**	Bright House Networks Stadium • Orlando, FL (War on I-4)	ESPN	**UCF** 23-20	45,952	
November 29	12:00 p.m.	**SMU**	**Houston**	Reliant Stadium • Houston, TX (rivalry)	ESPN2	**HOU** 34-0	23,210	
November 30	12:00 p.m.	**Rutgers**	**Connecticut**	Rentschler Field • East Hartford, CT	ESPNU	**CONN** 28-17	22,163	
November 30	12:00 p.m.	**Temple**	**Memphis**	Liberty Bowl Memorial Stadium • Memphis, TN		**TEM** 41-21	25,671	
^{#}Rankings from AP Poll released prior to game. All times are in Eastern Time.

Bye Week: Cincinnati, Louisville

=== Week 15 ===
Date	Time	Visiting team	Home team	Site	TV	Result	Attendance	Ref.
December 5	7:30 p.m.	#19 **Louisville**	**Cincinnati**	Nippert Stadium • Cincinnati, OH (Battle for The Keg of Nails)	ESPN	**LOU** 31-24 OT	35,097	
December 7	7:30 p.m.	**South Florida**	**Rutgers**	High Point Solutions Stadium • Piscataway, NJ	ESPN2	**RUTG** 31-6	37,645	
December 7	1:00 p.m.	**Memphis**	**Connecticut**	Rentschler Field • East Hartford, CT		**CONN** 45-10	17,086	
December 7	12:00 p.m.	#15 **UCF**	**SMU**	Gerald J. Ford Stadium • Dallas, TX	ESPN	**UCF** 17-13	12,589	
^{#}Rankings from AP Poll released prior to game. All times are in Eastern Time.

Bye Week: Temple, Houston

== Bowl games ==
Date	Time	Visiting team	Home team	Site	TV	Result	Attendance	Ref.
December 28*	12:15 p.m.	Rutgers	Notre Dame	Yankee Stadium • Bronx, NY (Pinstripe Bowl)	ESPN	L 29-16	47,122	
December 28*	3:20 p.m.	Cincinnati	North Carolina	Bank of America Stadium • Charlotte, NC (Belk Bowl)	ESPN	L 39-17	45,211	
December 28*	6:45 p.m.	No. 18 Louisville	Miami Hurricanes	Citrus Bowl • Orlando, FL (Russell Athletic Bowl)	ESPN	W 36-9	51,098	
January 1*	8:30 p.m.	No. 15 UCF	No. 6 Baylor	University of Phoenix Stadium • Glendale, AZ (Fiesta Bowl)	ESPN	W 52-42	65,172	
January 4*	1:00 p.m.	Vanderbilt	Houston	Legion Field • Birmingham, AL (BBVA Compass Bowl)	ESPN	L 41-24	42,717	
^{#}Rankings from AP Poll released prior to game. All times are in Eastern Time.

Note: The American Athletic Conference did not have enough bowl eligible teams to send a representative to the Beef 'O' Brady's Bowl.

=== Bowl Eligibility ===
==== Bowl Eligible ====
- Louisville (11-1): Became bowl eligible on October 10 after defeating Rutgers.
- Houston (8-4): Became bowl eligible on October 26 after defeating Rutgers.
- UCF (11-1): Became bowl eligible on October 26 after defeating Connecticut.
- Cincinnati (9-3): Became bowl eligible on October 30 after defeating Memphis.
- Rutgers (6-6): Became bowl eligible on December 7 after defeating South Florida.

==== Bowl Ineligible ====
- Connecticut (3-9): Lost the ability to become bowl eligible on October 26 after losing to UCF.
- Temple (2-10): Lost the ability to become bowl eligible on October 26 after losing to SMU.
- South Florida (2-10): Lost the ability to become bowl eligible on November 16 after losing to Memphis.
- Memphis (3-9): Lost the ability to become bowl eligible on November 23 after losing to Louisville.
- SMU (5-7): Lost the ability to become bowl eligible on December 7 after losing to UCF.

== Records against other conferences ==
=== American vs. BCS conferences ===
Legend
American Win
American Loss

Date	Visitor	Home	Winning team	Opponent Conference
August 30	Texas Tech	SMU	Texas Tech	Big 12
August 31	Purdue	Cincinnati	Cincinnati	Big Ten
September 7	Cincinnati	Illinois	Illinois	Big Ten
September 7	Duke	Memphis	Duke	ACC
September 7	South Florida	Michigan State	Michigan State	Big Ten
September 14	Louisville	Kentucky	Louisville	SEC
September 14	Maryland	Connecticut	Maryland	ACC
September 14	UCF	Penn State	UCF	Big Ten
September 21	Michigan	Connecticut	Michigan	Big Ten
September 21	Arkansas	Rutgers	Rutgers	SEC
September 21	SMU	Texas A&M	Texas A&M	SEC
September 28	SMU	TCU	TCU	Big 12
September 28	Miami	South Florida	Miami	ACC
September 28	South Carolina	UCF	South Carolina	SEC

=== American vs. FBS conferences ===
Conference	Record
ACC	1-3
Big 12	1-2
Big Ten	2-3
Independents	1-3
Pac-12	0-0
SEC	2-3
Total	7-14

== Players of the week ==
Following each week of games, American Athletic Conference officials select the players of the week from the conference's teams.

Week	Offensive			Defensive			Special teams		
Week	Player	Position	Team	Player	Position	Team	Player	Position	Team
Aug 31	Teddy Bridgewater	QB	Louisville	Terrance Plummer	LB	UCF	Richie Leone	P	Houston
Sept 7	Deontay Greenberry	WR	Houston	Calvin Pryor	S	Louisville	JaBryce Taylor	WR	SMU
Sept 14	Blake Bortles	QB	UCF	Lorenzo Mauldin	DE	Louisville	Quron Pratt	WR	Rutgers
Sept 21	Gary Nova	QB	Rutgers	Martin Ifedi	DE	Memphis	Janarion Grant	WR	Rutgers
Sept 28	John O'Korn	QB	Houston	William Jackson	CB	Houston	Brandon Wilson	DB	Houston
Oct 5	Garrett Gilbert	QB	SMU	Terrance Plummer	LB	UCF	Marvin Kloss	K	USF
Oct 12	Brendon Kay	QB	Cincinnati	Calvin Pryor	S	Louisville	Jake Elliott	K	Memphis
Oct 19	Storm Johnson	RB	UCF	Derrick Matthews	LB	Houston	Paul Layton	P	Temple
Oct 26	Garrett Gilbert	QB	SMU	Trevon Stewart	S	Houston	Shawn Moffitt	K	UCF
Nov 2	Gary Nova	QB	Rutgers	Zach Edwards	S	Cincinnati	Marvin Kloss	K	USF
Nov 9	Garrett Gilbert	QB	SMU	Brandon Alexander	S	UCF	Charles Gaines	CB	Louisville
Nov 16	J. J. Worton	WR	UCF	Bobby McCain	CB	Memphis	Jake Elliott	K	Memphis
Nov 23	Brandon Kay	QB	Cincinnati	Yawin Smallwood	LB	Connecticut	Richie Leone	P	Houston
Nov 30	P. J. Walker	QB	Temple	Taylor Mack	CB	Connecticut	Rannell Hall	WR	UCF

=== Position key ===
Center	C	Cornerback	CB	Defensive back	DB	Defensive end	DE
Defensive lineman	DL	Defensive tackle	DT	Guard	G	Kickoff returner	KR
Offensive tackle	OT	Offensive lineman	OL	Linebacker	LB	Long snapper	LS
Punter	P	Placekicker	PK	Punt returner	PR	Quarterback	QB
Running back	RB	Safety	S	Tight end	TE	Wide receiver	WR

== Awards and honors ==
=== Conference awards ===
The following individuals received postseason honors as voted by the American Athletic Conference football coaches

2013 American Athletic Conference Individual Awards
Award	Recipient(s)
Offensive Player of the Year	Blake Bortles, UCF
Defensive Player of the Year	Marcus Smith, Louisville
Special Teams Player of the Year	Tom Hornsey, Memphis Demarcus Ayers, Houston
Rookie of the Year	John O' Korn, Houston
Coach of the Year	George O' Leary, UCF

2013 All-American Athletic Conference Football Teams
First Team		Second Team	
Offense	Defense	Offense	Defense
WR - Deontay Greenberry, Houston; WR - DeVante Parker, Louisville; OT - Eric Lefeld, ^{^} Cincinnati; OT - Jamon Brown, Louisville; OG - Jordan McCray, UCF; C - Jake Smith, Louisville; TE - Blake Annen, Cincinnati; TE - Tyler Kroft, Rutgers; QB - Blake Bortles, UCF; RB - Storm Johnson, ^{^}UCF; RB - Paul James, Rutgers; K - Jake Elliott, Memphis; RS - Ralph David Abernathy IV, Cincinnati; RS - Demarcus Ayers, Houston	DL - Jordan Stepp, Cincinnati; DL - Marcus Smith II, Louisville; DL - Martin Ifedi, Memphis; DL - Aaron Lynch, USF; LB - Terrance Plummer, UCF; LB - Yawin Smallwood, UConn; LB - Tyler Matakevich, Temple; CB - Jacoby Glenn, UCF; CB - Charles Gaines, Louisville; S - Calvin Pryor, Louisville; S - Hakeem Smith, Louisville; P - Tom Hornsey, Memphis	WR - Anthony McClung, Cincinnati; WR - J.J. Worton, UCF; WR - Jeremy Johnson, SMU; OT - Chris Martin, UCF; OT - DeAnthony Sims, Houston; OG - Sam Longo, Cincinnati; OG - John Miller, Louisville; C - Betim Bujari, Rutgers; QB - Teddy Bridgewater, Louisville; TE - Mike McFarland, USF; RB - William Stanback, UCF; RB - Marcus Shaw, USF; K - Shawn Moffitt, UCF; RS - Janarion Grant, Rutgers	DL - Silverberry Mouhon, Cincinnati; DL - Shamar Stephen, UConn; DL - Lorenzo Mauldin, Louisville; DL - Luke Sager, USF; LB - Greg Blair, Cincinnati; LB - Preston Brown, Louisville; LB - DeDe Lattimore, USF; CB - Deven Drane, Cincinnati; CB - Zach McMillian, Houston; CB - Kenneth Acker, SMU; S - Clayton Geathers, UCF; P - Trevon Stewart, Houston; P - Richie Leone, Houston
^{^} - denotes unanimous selection Additional players added to the All-AAC teams due to ties in the voting

== Home game attendance ==
Team	Stadium	Capacity	Gm 1	Gm 2	Gm 3	Gm 4	Gm 5	Gm 6	Gm 7	Total	Average
Cincinnati	Nippert Stadium	35,000	36,007	30,384	32,220	28,847				127,458	31,864
Connecticut	Rentschler Field	40,000	30,689	38,916	42,704	37,861				150,170	37,542
Houston	Reliant Stadium, BBVA Compass Stadium	46,846 (Average of Stadiums)	26,205 _{1}	20,103 _{2}	33,115 _{1}					79,243	26,474
Louisville	Papa John's Cardinal Stadium	55,000	55,332	53,647	55,168	55,215				270,948	54,190
Memphis	Liberty Bowl Memorial Stadium	61,000	44,237	36,279	30,274	16,241				127,031	31,758
Rutgers	High Point Solutions Stadium	52,454	49,111	47,604	51,969					148,684	49,561
SMU	Gerald J. Ford Stadium	32,000	34,790	10,107	19,436		14,639			78,972	23,111
South Florida	Raymond James Stadium	65,857	35,470	33,792	47,562	31,077				147,091	36,975
Temple	Lincoln Financial Field	68,532	27,328	20,047	21,709	25,533				94,617	23,654
UCF	Bright House Networks Stadium	45,323	35,115	47,605	37,924	44,665	41,244	45,952		252,505	42,084

_{1} @ Reliant Stadium _{2} @ BBVA Compass Field

- UH vs Rice (34,481) a neutral site game does not count towards attendance
