= 2013 Memphis Tigers football team =

American college football season

2013 Memphis Tigers football
- Conference: American Athletic Conference
- Record: 3–9 (1–7 The American)
- Head coach: Justin Fuente (2nd season)
- Offensive coordinator: Darrell Dickey (2nd season)
- Offensive scheme: Pro-style
- Defensive coordinator: Barry Odom (2nd season)
- Base defense: 4–3
- Home stadium: Liberty Bowl Memorial Stadium

2013 American Athletic Conference football standings
	Conf.			Overall
Team	W		L	W		L
No. 10 UCF $	8	–	0	12	–	1
No. 15 Louisville	7	–	1	12	–	1
Cincinnati	6	–	2	9	–	4
Houston	5	–	3	8	–	5
SMU	4	–	4	5	–	7
Rutgers	3	–	5	6	–	7
UConn	3	–	5	3	–	9
South Florida	2	–	6	2	–	10
Memphis	1	–	7	3	–	9
Temple	1	–	7	2	–	10
$ – BCS representative as conference champion; Rankings from AP Poll

The 2013 Memphis Tigers football team represented the University of Memphis in the 2013 NCAA Division I FBS football season. The Tigers were led by second year head coach Justin Fuente and played their home games at the Liberty Bowl Memorial Stadium in Memphis, Tennessee. The Tigers competed as a member of the American Athletic Conference. They finished the season 3–9, 1–7 in American Athletic play to finish in a tie for ninth place. Tom Hornsey won the Ray Guy Award, which honors college football's best punter.

== Schedule ==
Date	Time	Opponent	Site	TV	Result	Attendance
September 7	3:30 p.m.	Duke*	Liberty Bowl Memorial Stadium; Memphis, TN	ESPN3	L 14–28	44,237
September 14	6:00 p.m.	at Middle Tennessee*	Johnny "Red" Floyd Stadium; Murfreesboro, TN	CSS	L 15–17	23,992
September 21	4:30 p.m.	Arkansas State*	Liberty Bowl Memorial Stadium; Memphis, TN (Paint Bucket Bowl)	ESPN3	W 31–7	36,279
October 5	3:30 p.m.	UCF	Liberty Bowl Memorial Stadium; Memphis, TN	ESPN3	L 17–24	30,274
October 12	11:00 a.m.	at Houston	BBVA Compass Stadium; Houston, TX	ESPNews	L 15–25	20,103
October 19	11:00 a.m.	SMU	Liberty Bowl Memorial Stadium; Memphis, TN	AAN	L 29–34	16,241
October 30	7:00 p.m.	Cincinnati	Liberty Bowl Memorial Stadium; Memphis, TN (rivalry)	ESPN2	L 21–34	22,571
November 9	3:30 p.m.	UT Martin*^{†}	Liberty Bowl Memorial Stadium; Memphis, TN	ESPN3	W 21–6	24,487
November 16	6:00 p.m.	at South Florida	Raymond James Stadium; Tampa, FL	ESPN3	W 23–10	30,831
November 23	12:00 p.m.	at No. 15 Louisville	Papa John's Cardinal Stadium; Louisville, KY (rivalry)	AAN	L 17–24	46,421
November 30	3:30 p.m.	Temple	Liberty Bowl Memorial Stadium; Memphis, TN	ESPNews	L 21–41	25,671
December 7	12:00 p.m.	at UConn	Rentschler Field; East Hartford, CT	ESPN3	L 10–45	17,086
*Non-conference game; ^{†}Homecoming; Rankings from Coaches' Poll released prior to the game; All times are in Central time
