= Tom Hornsey =

Australian-born American football player (born 1989)

No. 43
- Position: Punter

Personal information
- Born: 17 February 1989 (age 37); Geelong, Victoria, Australia
- Listed height: 6 ft 3 in (1.91 m)
- Listed weight: 217 lb (98 kg)

Career information
- High school: St Joseph's (Newtown, Victoria)
- College: Memphis (2010–2013)

Awards and highlights
- Ray Guy Award (2013); Consensus All-American (2013); AAC Co-Special Teams Player of the Year (2013); First-team All-AAC (2013)

Tom Hornsey (born 17 February 1989) is an Australian-born former football punter who played college football for the Memphis Tigers, where he won the Ray Guy Award in 2013.

== Australian rules football ==
Hornsey is from Geelong, Victoria, Australia. He played Australian rules football, and played in the championship of the Geelong Football League. In 2008, he was listed on the roster of the Geelong VFL Football Club of the VFL.

== College career ==
Hornsey attended the University of Memphis in Memphis, Tennessee, where he was the starting punter for the Memphis Tigers football team from 2010 to 2013. As a senior in 2013, he had 62 punts for 2,800 yards, an average of 45.32 yards per punt. He was a recognized as consensus first-team All-American, having received first-team honors from the American Football Coaches Association, Associated Press, Football Writers Association of America, and USA Today, and won the Ray Guy Award recognizing him as the best college football punter in the nation. He finished his four-year college career with 297 punts for 12,815 yards, with an average punt of 43.1 yards

== Professional career ==
Hornsey went undrafted in the 2014 NFL Draft.

Tom was with the New York Jets during rookie minicamp.

On 11 August 2014, Hornsey signed with the Dallas Cowboys. The Cowboys released Hornsey on 26 August 2014.

Hornsey had an average punt distance of 50.2 yards, the best in NFL preseason, with a 63 yard long, in 2 game (5 punts) with Dallas.

Hornsey had workouts with both the Tampa Bay Buccaneers and Pittsburgh Steelers either during or after the 2014 season.

Hornsey signed with the Dallas Cowboys as a free agent on 19 February 2015.

Hornsey was cut by the Dallas Cowboys on Tuesday, 1 September 2015 as part of the first wave of NFL roster cuts in order for each team to get down to the required 75 players.
