= 2013 Rutgers Scarlet Knights football team =

American college football season

2013 Rutgers Scarlet Knights football

Pinstripe Bowl, L 16–29 vs. Notre Dame
- Conference: American Athletic Conference
- Record: 6–7 (3–5 The American)
- Head coach: Kyle Flood (2nd season)
- Offensive coordinator: Ron Prince (1st season)
- Offensive scheme: Pro-style
- Defensive coordinator: Dave Cohen (1st season; regular season); Joe Rossi (interim; bowl game)
- Base defense: 4–3
- Home stadium: High Point Solutions Stadium

2013 American Athletic Conference football standings
	Conf.			Overall
Team	W		L	W		L
No. 10 UCF $	8	–	0	12	–	1
No. 15 Louisville	7	–	1	12	–	1
Cincinnati	6	–	2	9	–	4
Houston	5	–	3	8	–	5
SMU	4	–	4	5	–	7
Rutgers	3	–	5	6	–	7
UConn	3	–	5	3	–	9
South Florida	2	–	6	2	–	10
Memphis	1	–	7	3	–	9
Temple	1	–	7	2	–	10
$ – BCS representative as conference champion; Rankings from AP Poll

The 2013 Rutgers Scarlet Knights football team represented Rutgers University in the 2013 NCAA Division I FBS football season. The Scarlet Knights played their home games at High Point Solutions Stadium in Piscataway, NJ as a member of the American Athletic Conference. (formerly the Big East) This was the second season with Kyle Flood as the head coach, and last season before transitioning to playing in the Big Ten Conference. They finished the season 6–7, 3–5 in American Athletic play to finish in a tie for sixth place. They were invited to the Pinstripe Bowl where they were defeated by Notre Dame. Notre Dame would later vacate the win on November 22, 2016 due to academic violations.

== Coaching staff ==
Rutgers head coach Kyle Flood enters his second year as the Scarlet Knights' head coach for the 2013 season (eighth year on the coaching staff overall). During his first year as head coach, he led the Scarlet Knights to an overall record of 9 wins and 4 losses (9–4) and the 2012 Big East Championship as co-champions with Louisville, Syracuse, and Cincinnati. Flood was awarded as co-Big East Head Coach of the year.

=== Coaching changes ===
==== Departures from 2012 ====
Former offensive coordinator Dave Brock accepted an offer to become the head coach of the Delaware Blue Hens.

Former defensive coordinator Robb Smith accepted an offer to become linebackers coach of the Tampa Bay Buccaneers.

Former tight ends coach Darnell Dinkins "left to pursue other interests".

==== Additions and promotions ====
Ron Prince, former head coach of the Kansas State Wildcats and most recently an offensive line coach with the Indianapolis Colts and Jacksonville Jaguars of the National Football League (NFL) was hired as offensive coordinator. Dave Cohen was promoted from linebackers coach to defensive coordinator, a position he has held previously with Western Michigan, Delaware, and Fordham. Darrell Wilson was hired away from Iowa, where he coached in the Big Ten Conference for twelve years, to coach defensive backs in his home state of New Jersey.

==== Departures after regular season ====
At the conclusion of the regular season, Dave Cohen, Rob Spence, and Damian Wroblewski were fired by the university.

=== Coaching staff ===
Name	Position	Seasons at Rutgers	Alma mater
Kyle Flood	Head coach	8	Iona College (1992)
Ron Prince	Offensive coordinator/quarterbacks	1	Dodge City Community College/Appalachian State
Norries Wilson	Running Backs/Associate head coach	2	Minnesota (1989)
Joe Rossi	Special teams coordinator/defensive coordinator	2	Allegheny College (2000)
Matt Simon	Wide receivers	1	Northern Illinois University (2009)
Anthony Campanile	Wide Receivers/tight ends	2	Rutgers University (2004)
Jim Panagos	Defensive line	2	University of Maryland (1992)
Darrell Wilson	Defensive backs	1	University of Connecticut (1981)
Charlie Noonan	Defensive Line Assistant	1	Rutgers University (2010)
Sam Williams	Special Teams Assistant	1	
Darnell Stapleton	Offensive Assistant Coach	2	Rutgers University (2006)
Jeremy Cole	Strength and Conditioning/Assistant AD	6	University of Findlay (2005)

== Schedule ==
Date	Time	Opponent	Site	TV	Result	Attendance
August 29	10:30 pm	at Fresno State*	Bulldog Stadium; Fresno, CA	ESPNU	L 51–52 ^{OT}	33,098
September 7	12:00 pm	Norfolk State*	High Point Solutions Stadium; Piscataway, NJ	CBSSN	W 38–0	49,111
September 14	1:00 pm	Eastern Michigan*	High Point Solutions Stadium; Piscataway, NJ	ESPN3	W 28–10	47,604
September 21	3:30 pm	Arkansas*	High Point Solutions Stadium; Piscataway, NJ	ESPN	W 28–24	51,969
October 5	12:00 pm	at SMU	Gerald J. Ford Stadium; University Park, TX	ESPNews	W 55–52 ^{3OT}	19,436
October 10	7:30 pm	at No. 8 Louisville	Papa John's Cardinal Stadium; Louisville, KY	ESPN	L 10–24	55,168
October 26	12:00 pm	Houston^{†}	High Point Solutions Stadium; Piscataway, NJ	ESPNews	L 14–49	52,200
November 2	12:00 pm	Temple	High Point Solutions Stadium; Piscataway, NJ	AAN	W 23–20	46,447
November 16	12:00 pm	Cincinnati	High Point Solutions Stadium; Piscataway, NJ	ESPNews	L 17–52	40,870
November 21	7:30 pm	at No. 20 UCF	Bright House Networks Stadium; Orlando, FL	ESPN	L 17–41	41,244
November 30	12:00 pm	at UConn	Rentschler Field; East Harford, CT	ESPNU	L 17–28	22,163
December 7	7:30 pm	South Florida	High Point Solutions Stadium; Piscataway, NJ	ESPN2	W 31–6	37,645
December 28	12:00 pm	Notre Dame*	Yankee Stadium; Bronx, NY (Pinstripe Bowl)	ESPN	L 16–29	47,122
*Non-conference game; ^{†}Homecoming; Rankings from Coaches' Poll released prior to the game; All times are in Eastern time

== Game summaries ==
=== Fresno State ===
	1	2	3	4	OT	Total
Scarlet Knights	10	10	11	14	6	51
Bulldogs	7	14	7	17	7	52

Rutgers opted to attempt a two-point conversion to win the game in overtime. The two point conversion was not successful, and Fresno State won in overtime.

=== Norfolk State ===
	1	2	3	4	Total
Spartans	0	0	0	0	0
Scarlet Knights	21	0	14	3	38

=== Eastern Michigan ===
	1	2	3	4	Total
Eagles	3	7	0	0	10
Scarlet Knights	14	0	7	7	28

Quarterback Gary Nova left the game during the first quarter with a concussion, being relieved by Chas Dodd. After games of 182, 119, and 192 rushing yards, Sophomore walk-on Paul James led the country in rushing.

=== Arkansas ===
	1	2	3	4	Total
Razorbacks	10	0	14	0	24
Scarlet Knights	0	7	7	14	28

=== SMU ===
	1	2	3	4	OT	Total
Scarlet Knights	14	7	14	0	20	55
Mustangs	0	7	7	21	17	52

=== Louisville ===
	1	2	3	4	Total
Scarlet Knights	0	7	0	3	10
Cardinals	3	14	0	7	24

=== Houston ===
	1	2	3	4	Total
Cougars	7	21	14	7	49
Scarlet Knights	7	7	0	0	14

=== Temple ===
	1	2	3	4	Total
Owls	6	7	0	7	20
Scarlet Knights	0	3	6	14	23

=== Cincinnati ===
	1	2	3	4	Total
Bearcats	24	14	7	7	52
Scarlet Knights	7	0	0	10	17

=== Central Florida ===
	1	2	3	4	Total
Scarlet Knights	0	14	0	3	17
Knights	14	14	3	10	41

=== UConn ===
	1	2	3	4	Total
Scarlet Knights	7	3	7	0	17
Huskies	14	0	0	14	28

=== South Florida ===
	1	2	3	4	Total
Bulls	0	6	0	0	6
Scarlet Knights	14	7	0	10	31

=== Notre Dame (Pinstripe Bowl) ===
	1	2	3	4	Total
Scarlet Knights	10	3	0	3	16
Fighting Irish	10	3	3	13	29
