= 2013 Houston Cougars football team =

American college football season

2013 Houston Cougars football

BBVA Compass Bowl, L 24–41 vs. Vanderbilt
- Conference: American Athletic Conference
- Record: 8–5 (5–3 The American)
- Head coach: Tony Levine (2nd season)
- Offensive coordinator: Doug Meacham (1st season)
- Offensive scheme: Spread
- Defensive coordinator: David Gibbs (1st season)
- Base defense: Multiple
- Home stadium: Reliant Stadium (5 games); BBVA Compass Stadium (2 games)

2013 American Athletic Conference football standings
	Conf.			Overall
Team	W		L	W		L
No. 10 UCF $	8	–	0	12	–	1
No. 15 Louisville	7	–	1	12	–	1
Cincinnati	6	–	2	9	–	4
Houston	5	–	3	8	–	5
SMU	4	–	4	5	–	7
Rutgers	3	–	5	6	–	7
UConn	3	–	5	3	–	9
South Florida	2	–	6	2	–	10
Memphis	1	–	7	3	–	9
Temple	1	–	7	2	–	10
$ – BCS representative as conference champion; Rankings from AP Poll

The 2013 Houston Cougars football team represented the University of Houston in the 2013 NCAA Division I FBS football season. It was the 68th year of season play for Houston. The season marked the first for the Cougars as a member of the American Athletic Conference. Due to construction of the new TDECU Stadium during the 2013 season, the team played its home games at other locations in Houston.

The season featured the Cougars’ continued Bayou Bucket Classic rivalry with the Rice Owls. The game again became a non-conference battle due to the departure from Conference USA for the Cougars following the 2012 season. The previous time the two teams met as non-conference foes was during the 2004 season when the Rice Owls was a member of the Western Athletic Conference. The 2013 Bayou Bucket Classic was played at Reliant Stadium.

They finished the season 8–5, 5–3 in American Athletic play to finish in fourth place. They were invited to the BBVA Compass Bowl where they were defeated by Vanderbilt.

== Preseason ==
=== Recruits ===
For the 2013 recruiting class, Houston attained its highest overall class ranking since 2010, and its second-highest ranking ever by Rivals.com. However, Scout.com only gave Houston its seventh-best overall ranking.

College recruiting information (2013)
Name	Hometown	School	Height	Weight	40^{‡}	Commit date
Markeith Ambles; WR	Yuma, Arizona	Arizona Western CC	6 ft 3 in (1.91 m)	203 lb (92 kg)	4.7	Apr 8, 2013
Markeith Ambles; WR	Recruit ratings: Scout: Rivals: ESPN: (83)					
Demarcus Ayers; WR	Lancaster, Texas	Lancaster HS	5 ft 11 in (1.80 m)	174 lb (79 kg)	4.44	Feb 4, 2013
Demarcus Ayers; WR	Recruit ratings: Scout: Rivals: ESPN: (76)					
Tyus Bowser; DE	Tyler, Texas	John Tyler HS	6 ft 3 in (1.91 m)	225 lb (102 kg)	4.60	Feb 5, 2013
Tyus Bowser; DE	Recruit ratings: Scout: Rivals: ESPN: (74)					
Billy Cosh; QB	Annapolis, Maryland	Butler CC	6 ft 2 in (1.88 m)	218 lb (99 kg)	N/A	Dec 3, 2012
Billy Cosh; QB	Recruit ratings: Scout: Rivals: ESPN: (76)					
Ty Cummings; K	Southlake, Texas	Carroll HS	5 ft 11 in (1.80 m)	180 lb (82 kg)	N/A	Apr 30, 2012
Ty Cummings; K	Recruit ratings: Scout: Rivals: ESPN: (76)					
Emerald Faletuipapai; OL	Gardena, California	Junípero Serra HS	6 ft 6 in (1.98 m)	337 lb (153 kg)	N/A	Dec 19, 2012
Emerald Faletuipapai; OL	Recruit ratings: Scout: Rivals: ESPN: (71)					
Nomluis Fruge; LB	Houston, Texas	Furr HS	6 ft 1 in (1.85 m)	193 lb (88 kg)	N/A	Dec 13, 2012
Nomluis Fruge; LB	Recruit ratings: Scout: Rivals: ESPN: (68)					
Donald Gage; WR	Zachary, Louisiana	Zachary HS	6 ft 0 in (1.83 m)	173 lb (78 kg)	4.45	Feb 1, 2013
Donald Gage; WR	Recruit ratings: Scout: Rivals: ESPN: (78)					
Joseph Glenn; RB	Giddings, Texas	Giddings HS	5 ft 10 in (1.78 m)	199 lb (90 kg)	4.5	Jul 22, 2012
Joseph Glenn; RB	Recruit ratings: Scout: Rivals: ESPN: (78)					
Trevor Harris; DE	Brooklyn, New York	ASA CC	6 ft 5 in (1.96 m)	237 lb (108 kg)	4.5	Dec 19, 2012
Trevor Harris; DE	Recruit ratings: Scout: Rivals: ESPN: (NR)					
D'Juan Hines; QB	Houston, Texas	Dekaney HS	6 ft 2 in (1.88 m)	195 lb (88 kg)	4.5	Jun 22, 2012
D'Juan Hines; QB	Recruit ratings: Scout: Rivals: ESPN: (76)					
Chauntez Jackson; DE	Inglewood, California	Inglewood HS	6 ft 4 in (1.93 m)	237 lb (108 kg)	N/A	Jan 16, 2013
Chauntez Jackson; DE	Recruit ratings: Scout: Rivals: ESPN: (75)					
Chauntez Jackson; DE	Inglewood, California	Inglewood HS	6 ft 4 in (1.93 m)	237 lb (108 kg)	N/A	Jan 16, 2013
Chauntez Jackson; DE	Recruit ratings: Scout: Rivals: ESPN: (75)					
Michael Jolivet; DE	Beaumont, Texas	Navarro CC	6 ft 4 in (1.93 m)	247 lb (112 kg)	4.65	Jul 21, 2012
Michael Jolivet; DE	Recruit ratings: Scout: Rivals: ESPN: (77)					
John Leday; WR	Port Arthur, Texas	Memorial HS	6 ft 0 in (1.83 m)	183 lb (83 kg)	N/A	Dec 17, 2012
John Leday; WR	Recruit ratings: Scout: Rivals: ESPN: (NR)					
Kent London; DB	Milpitas, California	Foothill CC	6 ft 2 in (1.88 m)	213 lb (97 kg)	4.5	Feb 7, 2013
Kent London; DB	Recruit ratings: Scout: Rivals: ESPN: (73)					
Tyler McCloskey; LB	Houston, Texas	Memorial HS	6 ft 2 in (1.88 m)	223 lb (101 kg)	N/A	Dec 21, 2012
Tyler McCloskey; LB	Recruit ratings: Scout: Rivals: ESPN: (NR)					
John O'Korn; QB	Fort Lauderdale, Florida	St. Thomas Aquinas HS	6 ft 3 in (1.91 m)	207 lb (94 kg)	4.7	Jun 22, 2012
John O'Korn; QB	Recruit ratings: Scout: Rivals: ESPN: (77)					
Damien Parris; OL	San Pablo, California	Contra Costa CC	6 ft 7 in (2.01 m)	290 lb (130 kg)	4.9	Dec 16, 2012
Damien Parris; OL	Recruit ratings: Scout: Rivals: ESPN: (73)					
Deondre Skinner; TE	Patterson, Louisiana	Patterson HS	6 ft 3 in (1.91 m)	225 lb (102 kg)	4.9	Jan 13, 2013
Deondre Skinner; TE	Recruit ratings: Scout: Rivals: ESPN: (77)					
Ja'Braylin Thomas; OL	Weimar, Texas	Weimar HS	6 ft 6 in (1.98 m)	320 lb (150 kg)	N/A	May 16, 2012
Ja'Braylin Thomas; OL	Recruit ratings: Scout: Rivals: ESPN: (76)					
Josh Thomas; OL	Shreveport, Louisiana	Evangel Christian Academy HS	6 ft 6 in (1.98 m)	329 lb (149 kg)	N/A	Mar 31, 2012
Josh Thomas; OL	Recruit ratings: Scout: Rivals: ESPN: (73)					
Nick Thurman; DT	Dallas, Texas	Lake Highlands High School HS	6 ft 4 in (1.93 m)	260 lb (120 kg)	N/A	Dec 17, 2012
Nick Thurman; DT	Recruit ratings: Scout: Rivals: ESPN: (73)					
Caleb Tucker; LB	Monroe, Louisiana	Ouachita Parish HS	6 ft 2 in (1.88 m)	225 lb (102 kg)	4.5	Dec 19, 2012
Caleb Tucker; LB	Recruit ratings: Scout: Rivals: ESPN: (76)					
Turon Walker; DB	Pleasant Hill, California	Diablo Valley CC	6 ft 0 in (1.83 m)	185 lb (84 kg)	4.5	Dec 14, 2012
Turon Walker; DB	Recruit ratings: Scout: Rivals: ESPN: (75)					
Greg Ward; CB	Tyler, Texas	John Tyler HS	5 ft 10 in (1.78 m)	163 lb (74 kg)	4.5	Jun 20, 2012
Greg Ward; CB	Recruit ratings: Scout: Rivals: ESPN: (76)					
Javin Webb; RB	Shreveport, Louisiana	Evangel Christian Academy HS	5 ft 9 in (1.75 m)	187 lb (85 kg)	N/A	Dec 16, 2012
Javin Webb; RB	Recruit ratings: Scout: Rivals: ESPN: (70)					
Zach White; DB	Desoto, Texas	Evangel Christian Academy HS	6 ft 0 in (1.83 m)	163 lb (74 kg)	4.5	Feb 4, 2013
Zach White; DB	Recruit ratings: Scout: Rivals: ESPN: (NR)					
Overall recruit ranking: Scout: 62 Rivals: 50
‡ Refers to 40-yard dash; Note: In many cases, Scout, Rivals, 247Sports, On3, and ESPN may conflict in their listings of height, weight and 40 time.; In these cases, the average was taken. ESPN grades are on a 100-point scale.; Sources: "Houston Football Commitment List". Rivals.; "Football Recruiting: Commits". Scout.; "Houston Cougars: Recruiting Class". ESPN.; "Scout.com Team Recruiting Rankings". Scout.; "2013 Team Ranking". Rivals.com.

== Schedule ==
Date	Time	Opponent	Site	TV	Result	Attendance
August 30	7:30 p.m.	Southern*	Reliant Stadium; Houston, TX	ESPN3	W 62–13	26,205
September 7	11:00 a.m.	at Temple	Lincoln Financial Field; Philadelphia, PA	AAN	W 22–13	27,328
September 21	2:00 p.m.	vs. Rice*	Reliant Stadium; Houston, TX (Bayou Bucket Classic)	FSN	W 31–26	34,831
September 28	3:00 p.m.	at UTSA*	Alamodome; San Antonio, TX	FSN	W 59–28	32,487
October 12	11:00 a.m.	Memphis	BBVA Compass Stadium; Houston, TX	ESPNews	W 25–15	20,103
October 19	2:30 p.m.	BYU*^{†}	Reliant Stadium; Houston, TX	ESPNews	L 46–47	33,115
October 26	11:00 a.m.	at Rutgers	High Point Solutions Stadium; Piscataway, NJ	ESPNews	W 49–14	52,200
October 31	6:00 p.m.	South Florida	Reliant Stadium; Houston, TX	ESPN	W 35–23	22,707
November 9	6:00 p.m.	at No. 21 UCF	Bright House Networks Stadium; Orlando, FL	ESPN2	L 14–19	44,665
November 16	6:00 p.m.	at No. 13 Louisville	Papa John's Cardinal Stadium; Louisville, KY	ESPNU	L 13–20	53,027
November 23	11:00 a.m.	Cincinnati	BBVA Compass Stadium; Houston, TX	ESPNews	L 17–24	20,197
November 29	11:00 a.m.	SMU	Reliant Stadium; Houston, TX (rivalry)	ESPN2	W 34–0	23,210
January 4	12:00 p.m.	vs. Vanderbilt*	Legion Field; Birmingham, AL (BBVA Compass Bowl)	ESPN	L 24–41	42,717
*Non-conference game; ^{†}Homecoming; Rankings from Coaches' Poll released prior to the game; All times are in Central time

== Coaching staff ==
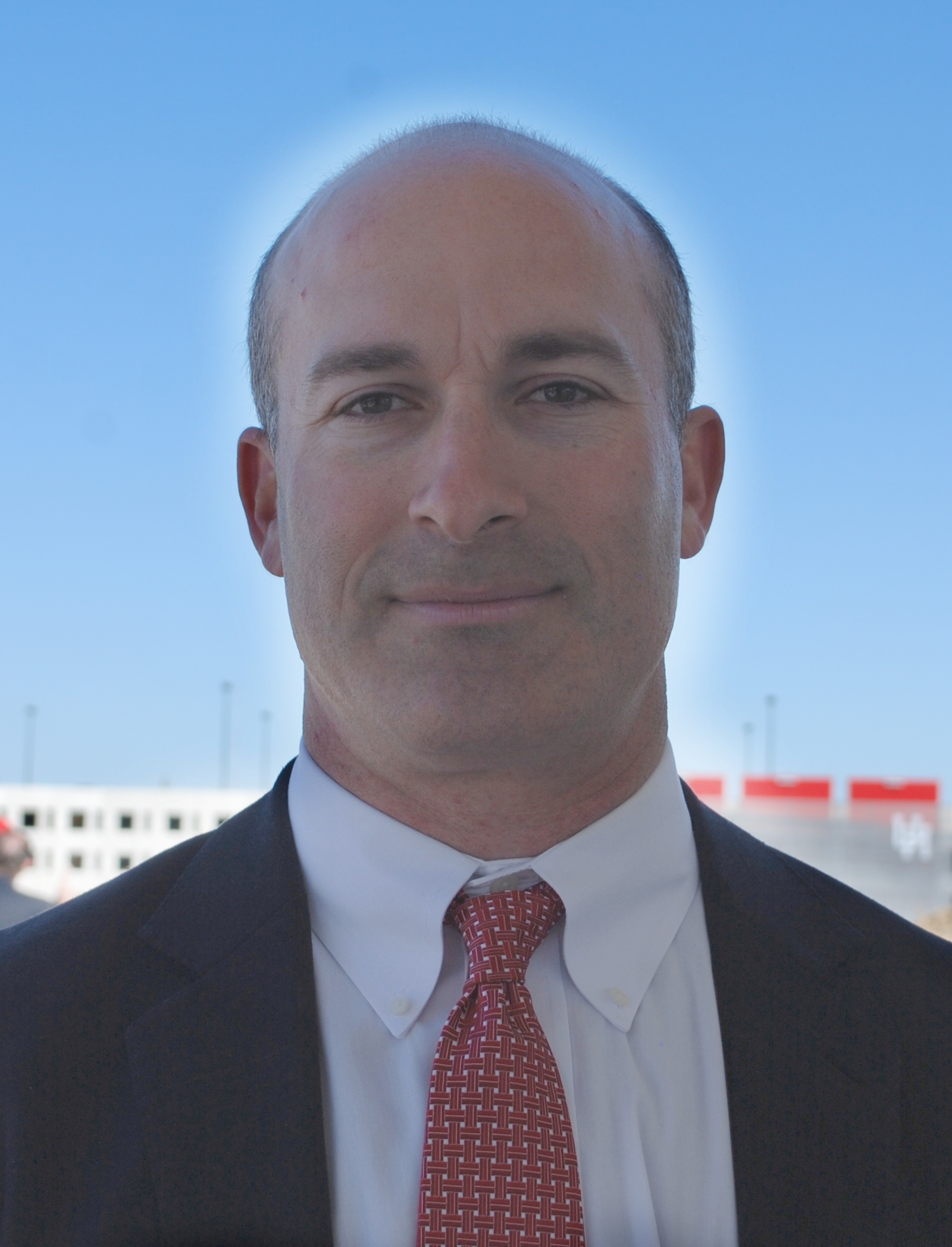
2013 was head coach Tony Levine's second full season in that position

Name	Position	Alma mater (Year)
Tony Levine	Head coach	Minnesota (1995)
Doug Meacham	Offensive coordinator	Oklahoma State (1987)
David Gibbs	Defensive coordinator	Colorado (1990)
Jamie Christian	Special teams coordinator/Inside receivers/Tight ends	Central Washington (1999)
Glen Elarbee	Offensive line	Middle Tennessee (2002)
Ricky Logo	Defensive line	North Carolina State (1992)
Vernon Hargreaves	Linebackers	Connecticut (1986)
Brandon Middleton	Outside receivers	Houston (2004)
Zac Spavital	Defensive backs	Murray State (2004)
Brian Odom	Co-director of sports performance	Southeastern Oklahoma State (2004)

== Game summaries ==
=== UTSA ===
Houston at UTSA

Team	1	2	3	4	Total
• Cougars	7	14	10	28	59
Roadrunners	7	14	7	0	28

- Date: September 28
- Location: Alamodome
  San Antonio, TX
- Game start: 3:05 p.m. CST
- Elapsed time: 3:43
- Game attendance: 32,487
- Game weather: 72 °F (22 °C), Indoors
- Referee: Tracy Jones
- TV announcers (FSN): Mark Followill, Brian Baldinger, & JC Pearson

Scoring summary
1	8:40	UTSA	Kam Jones 12-yard touchdown pass from Eric Soza, Sean Ianno kick good	UTSA 7–0
1	1:42	UH	Ryan Jackson 15-ard touchdown pass from John O'Korn, Richie Leone kick good	Tied 7–7
2	13:07	UH	Greg Ward Jr. 6-yard touchdown run, Richie Leone kick good	UH 14–7
2	5:45	UTSA	Eric Soza 1-yard touchdown run, Sean Ianno kick good	Tied 14–14
2	2:30	UH	Xavier Maxwell 7-yard touchdown pass from John O'Korne, Richie Leone kick good	UH 21–14
2	1:18	UTSA	Earon Holmes 6-yard touchdown pass from Eric Soza, Sean Ianno kick good	Tied 21–21
3	7:22	UH	Richie Leone 25-yard Field Goal	UH 24–21
3	3:11	UH	Brandon Wilson 78-yard touchdown return off of blocked Field Goal, Richie Leone kick good	UH 31–21
3	0:47	UTSA	David Glasco II 2-yard touchdown run, Sean Ianno kick good	UH 31–28
4	14:12	UH	Xavier Maxwell 22-yard touchdown pass from John O'Korne, Richie Leone kick good	UH 38–28
4	7:12	UH	Deontay Greenbury 20-yard touchdown pass from John O'Korne, Richie Leone kick good	UH 45–28
4	3:09	UH	Justin Hicks 15-yard touchdown run, Richie Leone kick good	UH 52–28
4	0:46	UH	William Jackson 96-yard Interception return for a touchdown, Richie Leone kick good	UH 59–28

=== BYU ===
BYU at Houston

Team	1	2	3	4	Total
• BYU Cougars	24	10	0	13	47
UH Cougars	21	17	2	6	46

- Date: October 19
- Location: Reliant Stadium
  Houston, TX
- Game start: 2:34 p.m. CST
- Elapsed time: 4:07
- Game attendance: 33,115
- Game weather: 72 °F (22 °C), Indoors
- Referee: Greg Burks
- TV announcers (ESPNews): Joe Davis & David Diaz-Infante

Scoring summary

Quarter	Time	Drive			Team	Scoring information	Score	
Quarter	Time	Plays	Yards	TOP	Team	Scoring information	BYU	Houston
1	14:05	3	41	0:39	BYU	Jamaal Williams 15-yard touchdown run, Justin Sorensen kick good	7	0
1	10:03	8	68	1:27	BYU	41-yard field goal by Justin Sorensen	10	0
1	9:47				Houston	Demarcus Ayers 95 yard kickoff return for a touchdown, Richie Leone kick good	10	7
1	8:10	7	75	1:37	BYU	Ross Apo 11-yard touchdown reception from Taysom Hill, Justin Sorensen kick good	17	7
1	7:02	3	75	1:08	Houston	Xavier Maxwell 69-yard touchdown reception from Greg Ward Jr., Richie Leone kick good	17	14
1	5:57				Houston	Interception returned 29 yards for touchdown by Derrick Mathews, Richie Leone kick good	17	21
1	3:13	9	75	2:44	BYU	Ross Apo 18-yard touchdown reception from Taysom Hill, Justin Sorensen kick good	24	21
2	11:11	9	61	2:44	Houston	29-yard field goal by Richie Leone	24	24
2	9:38	3	52	0:51	Houston	Deontay Greenberry 6-yard touchdown reception from John O'Korn, Richie Leone kick good	24	31
2	3:57	10	76	2:38	BYU	Jamaal Williams 1-yard touchdown run, Justin Sorensen kick good	31	31
2	1:31	9	75	2:26	Houston	Daniel Spencer 41-yard touchdown reception from John O'Korn, Richie Leone kick good	31	38
2	0:00	8	73	1:31	BYU	20-yard field goal by Justin Sorensen	34	38
3	1:38				Houston	Derrick Mathews 2-yard safety	34	40
4	12:57	9	97	2:17	BYU	Cody Hoffman 25-yard touchdown reception from Taysom Hill, Justin Sorensen kick good	41	40
4	5:20	7	84	1:16	Houston	Deontay Greenberry 10-yard touchdown reception from John O'Korn, 2-point pass incomplete	41	46
4	1:08	3	48	0:42	BYU	Skyler Ridley 11-yard touchdown reception from Taysom Hill, 2-point run failed	47	46
"TOP" = time of possession. For other American football terms, see Glossary of American football.							47	46

== Poll rankings ==
Ranking movements Legend: ██ Increase in ranking ██ Decrease in ranking — = Not ranked RV = Received votes
	Week																
Poll	Pre	1	2	3	4	5	6	7	8	9	10	11	12	13	14	15	Final
AP	—	—	—	—	—	—	—	RV	—	—	RV	RV	—	—	—	—	—
Coaches	—	—	—	—	—	—	—	RV	RV	RV	RV	—	—	—	—	—	—
Harris	Not released							RV	RV	RV	RV	RV	—	—	—	—	Not released
BCS	Not released								—	—	—	—	—	—	—	—	Not released
