= 2013 Cincinnati Bearcats football team =

American college football season

2013 Cincinnati Bearcats football

Belk Bowl, L 17–39 vs. North Carolina
- Conference: American Athletic Conference
- Record: 9–4 (6–2 The American)
- Head coach: Tommy Tuberville (1st season)
- Offensive coordinator: Eddie Gran (1st season)
- Offensive scheme: Spread
- Defensive coordinator: Art Kaufman (1st season)
- Co-defensive coordinator: Robert Prunty (1st season)
- Base defense: 4–3
- Home stadium: Nippert Stadium

2013 American Athletic Conference football standings
	Conf.			Overall
Team	W		L	W		L
No. 10 UCF $	8	–	0	12	–	1
No. 15 Louisville	7	–	1	12	–	1
Cincinnati	6	–	2	9	–	4
Houston	5	–	3	8	–	5
SMU	4	–	4	5	–	7
Rutgers	3	–	5	6	–	7
UConn	3	–	5	3	–	9
South Florida	2	–	6	2	–	10
Memphis	1	–	7	3	–	9
Temple	1	–	7	2	–	10
$ – BCS representative as conference champion; Rankings from AP Poll

The 2013 Cincinnati Bearcats football team represented the University of Cincinnati in the 2013 NCAA Division I FBS football season. The Bearcat football team played their home games at Nippert Stadium in Cincinnati, Ohio. The 2013 college football season was their first season as a member of the American Athletic Conference. The Bearcats were led by first year head coach Tommy Tuberville. They finished the season 9–4, 6–2 in American Athletic play to finish in third place. They were invited to the Belk Bowl where they lost to North Carolina.

== Schedule ==
Date	Time	Opponent	Rank	Site	TV	Result	Attendance
August 31	12:00 pm	Purdue*		Nippert Stadium; Cincinnati, OH	ESPNU	W 42–7	36,007
September 7	12:00 pm	at Illinois*		Memorial Stadium; Champaign, IL	ESPN2	L 17–45	43,031
September 14	7:00 pm	Northwestern State*		Nippert Stadium; Cincinnati, OH	ESPN3	W 66–9	30,384
September 21	4:00 pm	at Miami (OH)*		Yager Stadium; Oxford, OH (Victory Bell)	ESPN3	W 14–0	21,269
October 5	7:00 pm	at South Florida		Raymond James Stadium; Tampa, FL	ESPN3	L 20–26	31,077
October 11	8:30 pm	Temple		Nippert Stadium; Cincinnati, OH	ESPN	W 38–20	32,220
October 19	12:00 pm	UConn^{†}		Nippert Stadium; Cincinnati, OH	ESPNU	W 41–16	28,847
October 30	8:00 pm	at Memphis		Liberty Bowl Memorial Stadium; Memphis, TN (rivalry)	ESPN2	W 34–21	22,571
November 9	12:00 pm	SMU		Nippert Stadium; Cincinnati, OH	AAN	W 28–25	28,069
November 16	12:00 pm	at Rutgers		High Point Solutions Stadium; Piscataway, NJ	ESPNews	W 52–17	40,870
November 23	12:00 pm	at Houston		BBVA Compass Stadium; Houston, TX	ESPNews	W 24–17	20,197
December 5	7:30 pm	No. 16 Louisville	No. 23	Nippert Stadium; Cincinnati, OH (Keg of Nails)	ESPN	L 24–31 ^{OT}	35,097
December 28	3:20 pm	vs. North Carolina*		Bank of America Stadium; Charlotte, NC (Belk Bowl)	ESPN	L 17–39	45,211
*Non-conference game; ^{†}Homecoming; Rankings from Coaches' Poll released prior to the game; All times are in Eastern time

== Game summaries ==
=== Purdue ===
Team	1	2	3	4	Total
Boilermakers	0	7	0	0	7
• Bearcats	0	14	14	14	42

- Location: Cincinnati, OH
- Game start: 12:00
- Game attendance: 36,007
- Referee: Alex Kemp
- TV announcers (ESPNU): Eamon McAnaney, Anthony Becht

=== Illinois ===
Team	1	2	3	4	Total
Bearcats	0	7	10	0	17
• Fighting Illini	7	14	7	17	45

- Location: Champaign, IL
- Game start: 12:00
- Elapsed time: 3:34
- Referee: John O'Neill
- TV announcers (ESPN2): Bob Wischusen, Rod Gilmore, Quint Kessenich

=== Northwestern State ===
Team	1	2	3	4	Total
Demons	0	9	0	0	9
• Bearcats	14	21	10	21	66

- Location: Cincinnati, OH
- Game start: 7:00
- Game attendance: 30,384
- Referee: Todd LaPenta
- TV announcers (ESPN3): Dave Weekley, Rocky Boiman, Rontina McCann

=== Miami, OH ===
Battle for the Victory Bell

Team	1	2	3	4	Total
• Bearcats	0	0	0	14	14
RedHawks	0	0	0	0	0

- Location: Oxford, OH
- Game start: 4:00
- Game attendance: 21,269
- Referee: Jeff Maconaghy
- TV announcers (ESPN3): Jim Barbar, Pete Najarian, Rontina McCann

=== South Florida ===
Team	1	2	3	4	Total
Bearcats	0	6	0	14	20
• Bulls	10	13	3	0	26

- Location: Tampa, FL
- Game attendance: 31,077
- Referee: John McDaid
- Television network: ESPN3

=== Temple ===
Team	1	2	3	4	Total
Owls	13	7	0	0	20
• Bearcats	7	21	10	0	38

- Location: Cincinnati, OH
- Game start: 8:30
- Game attendance: 32,220
- Referee: Ed Ardito
- TV announcers (ESPN): Carter Blackburn, Danny Kanell, Allison Williams

=== UConn ===
Team	1	2	3	4	Total
Huskies	3	0	7	6	16
• Bearcats	7	20	7	7	41

- Location: Cincinnati, OH
- Game start: 12:00
- Game attendance: 28,847
- Referee: Todd LaPenta
- TV announcers (ESPNU): Tom Hart, John Congemi

=== Memphis ===
Team	1	2	3	4	Total
• Bearcats	0	14	7	13	34
Tigers	7	0	7	7	21

- Location: Memphis, TN
- Game start: 8:00
- TV announcers (ESPN2): Dave Neal, Andre Ware

=== SMU ===
Team	1	2	3	4	Total
Mustangs	7	3	0	15	25
• Bearcats	0	14	14	0	28

- Location: Cincinnati, OH
- Game start: 12:00
- TV announcers (American Athletic Network): Eamon McAnaney, Anthony Becht, Brooke Weisbrod

=== Rutgers ===
Team	1	2	3	4	Total
• Bearcats	24	14	7	7	52
Scarlet Knights	7	0	0	10	17

- Location: Piscataway, NJ
- Game start: 12:00
- TV announcers (ESPNews): Beth Mowins, Joey Galloway, Paul Carcaterra

=== Houston ===
Team	1	2	3	4	Total
• Bearcats	0	17	7	0	24
Cougars	0	7	10	0	17

- Location: Houston, TX
- Game start: 12:00
- TV announcers (ESPNews): Adam Amin, Rene Ingoglia

=== Louisville ===
Keg of Nails

Team	1	2	3	4	OT	Total
• Cardinals	7	3	0	14	7	31
Bearcats	0	7	7	10	0	24

- Location: Cincinnati, OH
- Game start: 7:30
- TV announcers (ESPN): Rece Davis, Jesse Palmer, David Pollack, Kaylee Hartung

== Roster ==
2013 Cincinnati Bearcats
Running back: 1 Ralph David Abernathy IV – Junior; 7 Tion Green – Sophomore; 9 Patrick Coyne – (redshirt) Sophomore; 10 Jordan Luallen (redshirt) Senior; 21 Rodriguez Moore – Junior; 23 Hosey Williams – Junior; 38 EJ Junior – (redshirt) Freshman; 39 Kyle Nutter – Freshman; 42 Jared Golden – Sophomore; 49 Anthony King – Senior; Wide receiver: 2 Mekale McKay – Sophomore; 3 Johnny Holton – Junior; 5 Mark Barr – Freshman; 6 Anthony McClung – Senior; 15 Chris Moore – (redshirt) Sophomore; 17 Jeremy Graves – Sophomore; 19 Shaq Washington – (redshirt) Sophomore; 20 Tshumbi Johnson – Freshman; 24 Chris Burrell – Junior; 34 Tim Helton – Freshman; 80 Alex Chisum – Junior; 82 Max Morrison – (redshirt) Sophomore; 84 Nate Cole – (redshirt) Freshman; 87 Javon Harrison – Freshman; 88 Shakim Alonzo – (redshirt) Freshman; Offensive line: 59 Deyshawn Bond – (redshirt) Freshman; 60 Sam Longo – (redshirt) Senior; 62 Cory Keebler – (redshirt) Junior; 63 Dan Sprague – (redshirt) Senior; 64 Will Steur – Freshman; 65 Tyreek Burwell – Senior; 66 David Niehaus – Freshman; 66 Garrett Campbell – Freshman; 67 Kyle Williamson – Freshman; 69 Dominic Mainello – Junior; 71 Eric Lefeld – (redshirt) Junior; 73 Ryan Leahy – (redshirt) Freshman; 74 Justin Murray – (redshirt) Sophomore; 75 Kevin Schloemer – Junior; 76 Austen Bujnoch – (redshirt) Senior; 77 Ben Flick – Freshman; 78 Parker Ehinger – (redshirt) Sophomore; 79 Andre Cureton – (redshirt) Senior	Quarterback: 2 Michael Colosimo – Junior; 4 Munchie Legaux – Senior; 8 Gunner Kiel – (redshirt) Freshman; 10 Bennie Coney (redshirt) Freshman; 11 Brendon Kay – (redshirt) Senior; Tight end: 18 Tyler Cogswell – Freshman; 35 Josh Russ – Junior; 46 Jared Golden – Freshman; 81 DJ Dowdy – (redshirt) Freshman; 83 Chris Burton – Freshman; 85 Travis Johnson – Freshman; 86 Blake Annen – (redshirt) Senior; Defensive line: 46 Mitch Meador – (redshirt) Senior; 50 Alex Pace – (redshirt) Freshman; 56 Mark Wilson – Freshman; 58 Dwight Jackson – Junior; 65 Connor Donnini – Sophomore; 70 Brandon Mitchell – (redshirt) Sophomore; 89 Korey Cunningham – Freshman; 90 Camaron Beard – (redshirt) Junior; 91 Adam Dempsey – Senior; 92 Silverberry Mouhon – (redshirt) Sophomore; 93 Brad Harrah – (redshirt) Junior; 94 Jordan Stepp – (redshirt) Senior; 95 Terrell Hartsfield – Junior; 96 Josh Posley – Sophomore; 97 Marquis Aiken – Senior; 98 Chad West – (redshirt) Sophomore; 99 Jerrell Jordan – Junior; Defensive back: 2 Trenier Orr – (redshirt) Sophomore; 3 Howard Wilder – Junior; 5 Aaron Brown – Freshman; 7 Mike Tyson – Freshman; 8 Adrian Witty – (redshirt) Junior; 9 Dionne Threatt-Vassar – Junior; 11 Deven Drane – Senior; 12 Leviticus Payne – Sophomore; 13 Grant Coleman – Freshman; 22 Zach Edwards – Freshman; 25 Arryn Chenault – Senior; 26 Braxton Lane – Freshman; 27 Drake Bruns – Freshman; 29 Andre Jones – Freshman; 30 Darren Dotson – Junior; 35 Dylan Coombs – Freshman; 36 Marcus Foster – Freshman	Linebacker: 23 Eric Wilson – (redshirt) Freshman; 32 Zach Higgenbotham – Freshman; 33 Solomon Tentman – (redshirt) Junior; 37 Lindsay Crook – Freshman; 38 Mason Antoun – (redshirt) Sophomore; 40 Kevin Brown – Sophomore; 41 Kevin Hyland – (redshirt) Sophomore; 43 Nick Temple – Junior; 44 Corey Mason – (redshirt) Junior; 45 Ey'Shawn McClain – (redshirt) Freshman; 48 Jeff Luc – Junior; 51 Greg Blair – Senior; 53 Franklin Bruscianelli – (redshirt) Freshman; 57 Clemente Casseus – Junior; Special teams: 14 Tony Miliano – (redshirt) Junior (K); 24 John Lloyd – Junior (P); 47 Jon Vincent – Freshman (LS); 55 Andrew Gantz – Freshman (K); 58 Sam Geraci – Freshman (P); 61 Kirk Willis – (redshirt) Sophomore (LS); Head coach: Tommy Tuberville; Assistant coaches: Eddie Gran – Offensive coordinator; Art Kaufman – Defensive coordinator; Robert Prunty – Associate head coach/defensive Ends; Steve Clinkscale – Defensive ends; Tyson Helton – Special teams coordinator/tight ends; Darin Hinshaw – Passing Game coordinator/quarterbacks; Darren Hiller – Offensive line; Blake Rolan – Wide receivers; Fred Tate – Defensive tackles; Joe walker – Director of Football Strength & Conditioning

=== Depth chart ===
as of December 27, 2013.

Defense

FS
Zach Edwards
Adrian Witty

WLB	MLB	SLB
⋅	Greg Blair	⋅
Corey Mason	Solomon Tentman	⋅

SS
Arryn Chenault
Mike Tyson

CB
Howard Wilder
Rod Moore

DE	DT	DT	DE
Terrell Hartfield	Adam Dempsey	Jordan Stepp	Silverberry Mouhon
Brad Harrah	Brandon Mitchell	Marques Aiken	Jerrell Jordan

CB
Deven Drane
Leviticus Payne

Offense

WR
Max Morrison
Mekale McKay

WR
Shaq Washington
Anthony McClung

LT	LG	C	RG	RT
Eric Lefeld	Austen Bujnoch	Deyshawn Bond	Sam Longo	Parker Ehinger
Cory Keebler	Kevin Schloemer	Dominic Mainello	Andre Cureton	Justin Murray

TE
Blake Annen
DJ Dowdy

WR
Chris Moore
Jeremy Graves

QB
Brendon Kay
Jordan Luallen

Special teams
PK Tony Miliano
P John Lloyd
P Tony Miliano
KR Ralph David Abernathy IV/Shaq Washington
PR Anthony McClung/Shaq Washington
LS Kirk Willis
H Brendon Kay

RB
Ralph David Abernathy IV
Tion Green

== Awards and milestones ==
=== American Athletic Conference honors ===
==== Offensive player of the week ====
- Week 7: Brendon Kay
- Week 13: Brendon Kay

==== Defensive player of the week ====
- Week 10: Zach Edwards

==== American Athletic Conference All-Conference First Team ====
- Eric Lefeld, OT
- Blake Annen, TE
- Ralph David Abernathy IV, RS
- Jordan Stepp, DL

==== American Athletic Conference All-Conference Second Team ====
- Anthony McClung, WR
- Sam Longo, OG
- Silverberry Mouhon, DL
- Greg Blair, LB
- Deven Drane, CB

== Rankings ==
Ranking movements Legend: ██ Increase in ranking ██ Decrease in ranking — = Not ranked RV = Received votes
	Week																
Poll	Pre	1	2	3	4	5	6	7	8	9	10	11	12	13	14	15	Final
AP	RV	RV	—	—	—	—	—	—	—	—	—	—	RV	RV	RV	RV	—
Coaches	RV	RV	—	—	—	RV	—	—	—	—	—	RV	RV	25	23	RV	RV
Harris	Not released							—	—	—	—	—	RV	RV	RV	RV	Not released
BCS	Not released								—	—	—	—	—	—	—	—	Not released
