= Deontay Greenberry =

American football player (born 1994)

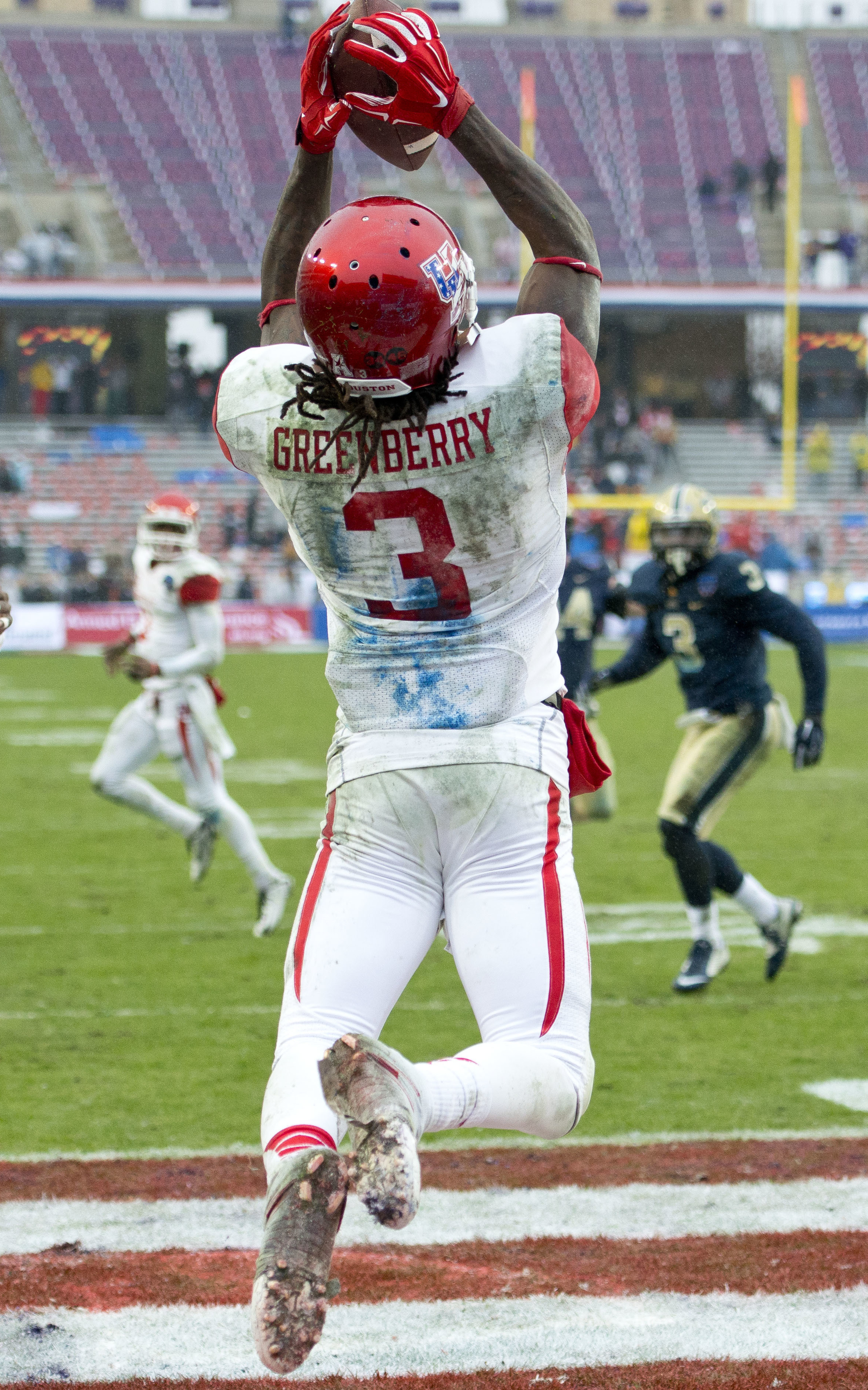
- Greenberry with Houston in 2015

No. 81, 86
- Position: Wide receiver

Personal information
- Born: March 7, 1994 (age 32); Fresno, California
- Listed height: 6 ft 3 in (1.91 m)
- Listed weight: 200 lb (91 kg)

Career information
- High school: Easton (CA) Washington Union
- College: Houston
- NFL draft: 2015: undrafted

Career history
- Dallas Cowboys (2015)*; Seattle Seahawks (2015)*
- * Offseason or practice squad member only

Deontay Greenberry (born 1994) is an American former football wide receiver. He played college football at Houston.

== Early life ==
Greenberry attended Washington Union High School in Easton, California, where he was a three-sport athlete in football, basketball and track. As a senior, he had 109 receptions for a California record 2,165 yards and 14 touchdowns. Greenberry was rated by Rivals.com as a four-star recruit and the seventh best receiver in his class. He originally committed to the University of Notre Dame to play college football, but switched to the University of Houston. He was the first five-star recruit ever to commit to the Cougars.

== College career ==
Greenberry attended Houston from 2012 to 2014. He played in all 12 games as a freshman in 2012 and had 47 receptions for 569 yards and three touchdowns. As a sophomore in 2013, he led the team with 82 receptions for 1,202 yards and 11 touchdowns. He again led the team with 68 receptions for 756 yards and four touchdowns.

After his junior season, Greenberry entered the 2015 NFL draft and was undrafted.
