= 2013 UConn Huskies football team =

American college football season

2013 UConn Huskies football
- Conference: American Athletic Conference
- Record: 3–9 (3–5 AAC)
- Head coach: Paul Pasqualoni (3rd season; first 4 games); T. J. Weist (interim; final 8 games)
- Offensive coordinator: T. J. Weist (1st season)
- Offensive scheme: Spread
- Defensive coordinator: Hank Hughes (1st season)
- Base defense: 4–3
- Home stadium: Rentschler Field

2013 American Athletic Conference football standings
	Conf.			Overall
Team	W		L	W		L
No. 10 UCF $	8	–	0	12	–	1
No. 15 Louisville	7	–	1	12	–	1
Cincinnati	6	–	2	9	–	4
Houston	5	–	3	8	–	5
SMU	4	–	4	5	–	7
Rutgers	3	–	5	6	–	7
UConn	3	–	5	3	–	9
South Florida	2	–	6	2	–	10
Memphis	1	–	7	3	–	9
Temple	1	–	7	2	–	10
$ – BCS representative as conference champion; Rankings from AP Poll

The 2013 UConn Huskies football team represented the University of Connecticut (UConn) as a member of the newly-formed American Athletic Conference (AAC) during the 2013 NCAA Division I FBS football season. The Huskies compiled an overall record of 3–9 with a mark of 3–5 in conference play, tying for sixth place in the AAC. Connecticut began the season under third-year head coach Paul Pasqualoni, who was fired on September 30, after a 0–4 start. T. J. Weist, the Huskies' defensive coordinator was appointed interim head coach for the remainder of the season. The team played home games at Rentschler Field in East Hartford, Connecticut.

== Schedule ==
Date	Time	Opponent	Site	TV	Result	Attendance	Source
August 29	7:30 pm	No. 11 (FCS) Towson*	Rentschler Field; East Hartford, CT	ESPN3	L 18–33	30,689	
September 14	7:30 pm	Maryland*	Rentschler Field; East Hartford, CT	ESPN3	L 21–32	38,916	
September 21	8:00 pm	No. 15 Michigan*	Rentschler Field; East Hartford, CT	ABC	L 21–24	42,704	
September 28	3:30 pm	at Buffalo*	University at Buffalo Stadium; Amherst, NY	ESPN3	L 12–41	20,952	
October 12	12:00 pm	South Florida	Rentschler Field; East Hartford, CT	AAN	L 10–13	37,861	
October 19	12:00 pm	at Cincinnati	Nippert Stadium; Cincinnati, OH	ESPNU	L 16–41	28,847	
October 26	12:00 pm	at No. 21 UCF	Bright House Networks Stadium; Orlando, FL (Civil Conflict)	AAN	L 17–62	37,924	
November 8	8:30 pm	No. 20 Louisville	Rentschler Field; East Hartford, CT	ESPN2	L 10–31	27,104	
November 16	3:00 pm	at SMU	Gerald J. Ford Stadium; University Park, TX	ESPN3	L 21–38	14,639	
November 23	7:00 pm	at Temple	Lincoln Financial Field; Philadelphia, PA	ESPN3	W 28–21	20,045	
November 30	12:00 pm	Rutgers	Rentschler Field; East Hartford, CT	ESPNU	W 28–17	22,163	
December 7	1:00 pm	Memphis	Rentschler Field; East Hartford, CT	ESPN3	W 45–10	17,086	
*Non-conference game; Rankings from AP Poll released prior to the game; All times are in Eastern time

== Game summaries ==
=== Towson ===
	1	2	3	4	Total
# 11 (FCS) Tigers	7	6	6	14	33
Huskies	7	3	0	8	18

=== Maryland ===
	1	2	3	4	Total
Terrapins	0	13	14	5	32
Huskies	7	3	3	8	21

=== Michigan ===
	1	2	3	4	Total
#15 Wolverines	7	0	7	10	24
Huskies	0	14	7	0	21

=== @ Buffalo ===
	1	2	3	4	Total
Huskies	3	9	0	0	12
Bulls	14	14	6	7	41

=== South Florida ===
	1	2	3	4	Total
Bulls	7	3	0	3	13
Huskies	3	7	0	0	10

=== @ Cincinnati ===
	1	2	3	4	Total
Huskies	3	0	7	6	16
Bearcats	7	20	7	7	41

=== @ UCF ===
	1	2	3	4	Total
Huskies	3	7	0	7	17
#21 Knights	21	24	10	7	62

=== Louisville ===
	1	2	3	4	Total
Cardinals	7	14	7	3	31
Huskies	0	3	0	7	10

=== @ SMU ===
	1	2	3	4	Total
Huskies	0	7	7	7	21
Mustangs	7	14	7	10	38

=== @ Temple ===
	1	2	3	4	Total
Huskies	0	0	14	14	28
Owls	7	14	0	0	21

=== Rutgers ===
	1	2	3	4	Total
Scarlet Knights	7	3	7	0	17
Huskies	14	0	0	14	28

=== Memphis ===
	1	2	3	4	Total
Tigers	3	0	7	0	10
Huskies	0	21	17	7	45

== NFL draft ==
The following Huskies were selected in the 2014 NFL draft following the season.

Round	Pick	Player	Position	NFL team
7	220	Shamar Stephen	Defensive tackle	Minnesota Vikings
7	253	Yawin Smallwood	Linebacker	Atlanta Falcons
