= 2013 Louisville Cardinals football team =

American college football season

2013 Louisville Cardinals football

Russell Athletic Bowl champion

Russell Athletic Bowl, W 36–9 vs. Miami (FL)
- Conference: American Athletic Conference

Ranking
- Coaches: No. 15
- AP: No. 15
- Record: 12–1 (7–1 The American)
- Head coach: Charlie Strong (4th season)
- Offensive coordinator: Shawn Watson (3rd season)
- Offensive scheme: Pro-style
- Defensive coordinator: Vance Bedford (4th season)
- Base defense: 4–3
- Home stadium: Papa John's Cardinal Stadium

2013 American Athletic Conference football standings
	Conf.			Overall
Team	W		L	W		L
No. 10 UCF $	8	–	0	12	–	1
No. 15 Louisville	7	–	1	12	–	1
Cincinnati	6	–	2	9	–	4
Houston	5	–	3	8	–	5
SMU	4	–	4	5	–	7
Rutgers	3	–	5	6	–	7
UConn	3	–	5	3	–	9
South Florida	2	–	6	2	–	10
Memphis	1	–	7	3	–	9
Temple	1	–	7	2	–	10
$ – BCS representative as conference champion; Rankings from AP Poll

The 2013 Louisville Cardinals football team represented the University of Louisville in the 2013 NCAA Division I FBS football season. The Cardinals were led by fourth-year head coach Charlie Strong. The Cardinals played their home games at Papa John's Cardinal Stadium in Louisville, Kentucky. They were in their last year as a member of the American Athletic Conference (formerly known as the Big East) until they moved to the Atlantic Coast Conference starting on July 1, 2014. They finished the season 12–1, 7–1 in American Athletic play to finish in second place. They were invited to the Russell Athletic Bowl where they defeated Miami (FL).

== Schedule ==
Date	Time	Opponent	Rank	Site	TV	Result	Attendance
September 1	3:30 p.m.	Ohio*	No. 9	Papa John's Cardinal Stadium; Louisville, KY	ESPN	W 49–7	55,332
September 7	12:00 p.m.	Eastern Kentucky*	No. 8	Papa John's Cardinal Stadium; Louisville, KY	ESPN3	W 44–7	53,647
September 14	12:00 p.m.	at Kentucky*	No. 7	Commonwealth Stadium; Lexington, KY (Governor's Cup)	ESPN	W 27–13	65,445
September 21	12:00 p.m.	FIU*	No. 7	Papa John's Cardinal Stadium; Louisville, KY	WHAS	W 72–0	51,586
October 5	12:00 p.m.	at Temple	No. 7	Lincoln Financial Field; Philadelphia, PA	AAN	W 30–7	21,709
October 10	7:30 p.m.	Rutgers	No. 8	Papa John's Cardinal Stadium; Louisville, KY	ESPN	W 24–10	55,168
October 18	8:00 p.m.	UCF	No. 8	Papa John's Cardinal Stadium; Louisville, KY	ESPN	L 35–38	55,215
October 26	12:00 p.m.	at South Florida	No. 18	Raymond James Stadium; Tampa, FL	ESPN2	W 34–3	35,782
November 8	8:30 p.m.	at UConn	No. 20	Rentschler Field; East Hartford, CT	ESPN2	W 31–10	27,104
November 16	7:00 p.m.	Houston	No. 19	Papa John's Cardinal Stadium; Louisville, KY	ESPNU	W 20–13	53,027
November 23	12:00 p.m.	Memphis	No. 21	Papa John's Cardinal Stadium; Louisville, KY (rivalry)	AAN	W 24–17	46,421
December 5	7:30 p.m.	at Cincinnati	No. 19	Nippert Stadium; Cincinnati, OH (The Keg of Nails)	ESPN	W 31–24 ^{OT}	35,097
December 28	6:45 p.m.	vs. Miami (FL)*	No. 18	Florida Citrus Bowl Stadium; Orlando, FL (rivalry) (Russell Athletic Bowl)	ESPN	W 36–9	51,098
*Non-conference game; Rankings from AP Poll released prior to the game; All times are in Eastern time

== Rankings ==
Ranking movements Legend: ██ Increase in ranking ██ Decrease in ranking
	Week																
Poll	Pre	1	2	3	4	5	6	7	8	9	10	11	12	13	14	15	Final
AP	9	8	7	7	7	7	8	8	18	20	20	19	21	21	19	18	15
Coaches	9	8	7	6	7	7	8	6	16	17	16	13	15	16	16	16	15
Harris	Not released							6	16	16	16	14	16	18	17	16	Not released
BCS	Not released								20	19	20	20	21	20	19	18	Not released

== Roster ==
2013 Louisville Cardinals football team roster
Players
Coaches
Offense '

Pos.	#	Name	Class
WR	2	Michaelee Harris	Jr
WR	3	Robert Clark	Jr
QB	5	Teddy Bridgewater	Jr
WR	7	Damian Copeland	Sr
WR	9	DeVante Parker	Jr
RB	10	Dominique Brown	Jr
QB	11	Will Gardner	Fr
QB	12	Brett Nelson	Jr
TE	15	Hunter Bowles	Fr
WR	17	DeMarcus Topp	Sr
RB	20	Corvin Lamb	So
RB	23	Brandon Radcliff	Fr
WR	29	Stephen Goodwin	Sr
WR	30	Diaz Bolden	Fr
WR	31	DeQuan West	Fr
RB	32	Senorise Perry	Sr
FB	36	Luke Brohm	So
WR	37	Martin Williams	Fr
FB	42	Tyler Sharp	So
FB	44	B. J. Butler	Sr
OL	53	Jake Smith	Jr
OL	54	Mike Romano	So
OL	60	Joe Manley	Fr
OL	62	T. C. Klusman	Fr
OL	63	Josh Stearns	So
OL	64	David Noltemeyer	Jr
OL	68	Kamran Joyner	Sr
OL	69	Chris Walker	Sr
OL	70	John Miller	Jr
OL	71	Chris Acosta	Jr
OL	73	Henry Vincent	Fr
OL	74	Ryan Mack	So
OL	75	Sid Anvoots	Fr
OL	76	Chase Petersen	So
OL	77	Abraham Garcia	So
OL	78	Aaron Epps	So
OL	79	Jamon Brown	Jr
TE	80	Zeke Pike	Fr
WR	82	Eli Rogers	Jr
TE	83	Ryan Hubbell	Jr
WR	86	Matt Milton	Jr
WR	87	Kai Dominguez	Jr
WR	88	Jarrett Davis	Sr

Defense

Pos.	#	Name	Class
LB	1	Keith Brown	So
LB	2	Preston Brown	Sr
CB	3	Charles Gaines	So
S	8	Gerod Holliman	Fr
DE	11	B. J. Dubose	Jr
DB	12	Stephan Robinson	Jr
LB	13	James Burgess	So
CB	15	Andrew Johnson	Jr
DL	97	DeAngelo Brown	So
DL	98	Sheldon Rankins	So
DL	99	Jamaine Brooks	Jr

Special teams

Pos.	#	Name	Class
K	8	Ryan Johnson	Jr
LS	33	Grant Donovan	Sr
K	35	Anthony George	Fr
K	40	Joshua Appleby	So
K	41	Matthew Nakatani	Jr
P	45	John Wallace	So

Head coach

- Charlie Strong

Coordinators/assistant coaches

- Vance Bedford
  Defensive coordinator
- Dave Borbely
  Offensive line
- Kenny Carter
  Running backs/special teams coordinator
- Ron Dugans
  Wide receivers
- Clint Hurtt
  Defensive line
- Brian Jean-Mary
  Linebackers
- Sherrone Moore
  Tight ends
- Pat Moorer
  Strength and conditioning
- Tommy Restivo
  Secondary

Legend

- (C) Team captain
- (S) Suspended
- (I) Ineligible
- Injured
- Redshirt

Roster
Last update: April 4, 2013
