= UConn Huskies football statistical leaders =

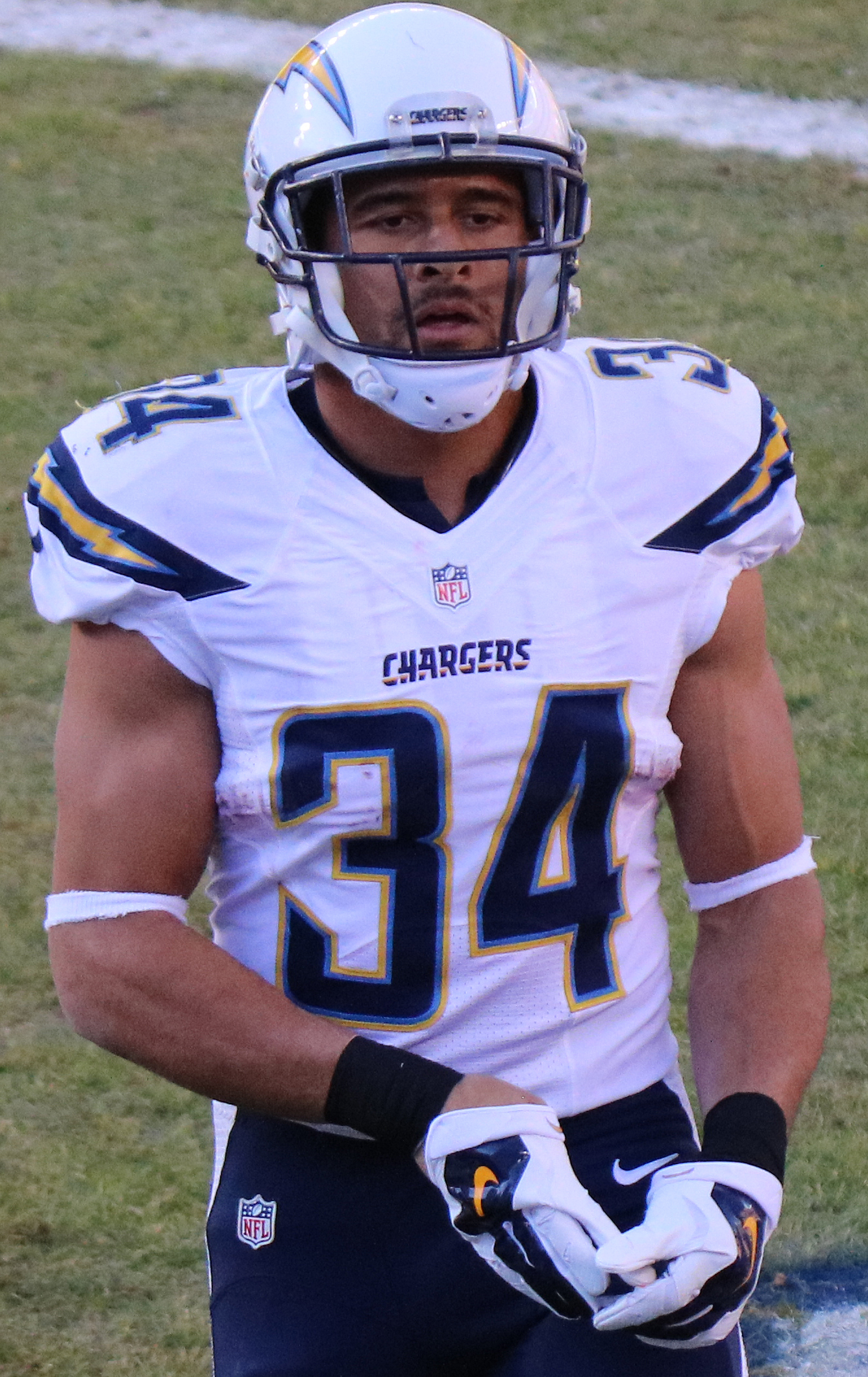
Donald Brown is Connecticut's all-time rushing leader.

The UConn Huskies football statistical are individual statistical leaders of the UConn Huskies football program in various categories, including passing, rushing, receiving, total offense, defensive stats, and kicking. Within those areas, the lists identify single-game, single-season, and career leaders. The Huskies represent the University of Connecticut in the NCAA as a Division I FBS independent.

Although UConn began competing in intercollegiate football in 1896, the school's official record book considers the "modern era" to have begun in 1952. Records from before this year are often incomplete and inconsistent, and they are generally not included in these lists.

These lists are dominated by more recent players for several reasons:

- Since 1952, seasons have increased from 10 games to 11 and then 12 games in length.
- The NCAA didn't allow freshmen to play varsity football until 1972 (with the exception of the World War II years), allowing players to have four-year careers.
- Bowl games only began counting toward single-season and career statistics in 2002, two years after UConn first played in FBS. From 1978 to 1999, UConn had played in Division I-AA, now known as Division I FCS; the NCAA's pre-2002 policy regarding I-AA/FCS playoff statistics was the same as that in FBS (then Division I-A). The Huskies have played in eight bowl games since then, and are assured of a ninth in 2025, allowing many recent players an extra game to accumulate statistics.
- Since 2018, players have been allowed to participate in as many as four games in a redshirt season; previously, playing in even one game "burned" the redshirt. Since 2024, postseason games have not counted against the four-game limit. These changes to redshirt rules have given very recent players several extra games to accumulate statistics.

These lists are updated through the end of the 2025 regular season. Players active for UConn in 2025 are in bold.

== Passing ==
=== Passing yards ===
Career
| Rk | Player | Yards | Years |
|---|---|---|---|
| 1 | Dan Orlovsky | 10,706 | 2001 2002 2003 2004 |
| 2 | Matt DeGennaro | 9,288 | 1987 1988 1989 1990 |
| 3 | Shane Stafford | 8,975 | 1995 1996 1997 1998 |
| 4 | Bryant Shirreffs | 6,375 | 2015 2016 2017 |
| 5 | **Joe Fagnano** | 5,252 | 2023 2024 2025 |
| 6 | Chandler Whitmer | 5,082 | 2012 2013 2014 |
| 7 | Ken Sweitzer | 4,949 | 1978 1979 1980 1981 |
| 8 | Peter Lane | 4,179 | 1985 1986 |
| 9 | Rick Robustelli | 4,160 | 1968 1969 1970 |
| 10 | Cornelius Benton | 4,035 | 1987 1988 1989 1990 1991 |

Single season
| Rk | Player | Yards | Year |
|---|---|---|---|
| 1 | Dan Orlovsky | 3,485 | 2003 |
| 2 | **Joe Fagnano** | 3,448 | 2025 |
| 3 | Dan Orlovsky | 3,354 | 2004 |
| 4 | Shane Stafford | 2,814 | 1997 |
| 5 | Cornelius Benton | 2,701 | 1991 |
| 6 | Chandler Whitmer | 2,664 | 2012 |
| 7 | Matt DeGennaro | 2,633 | 1988 |
| 8 | Dan Orlovsky | 2,488 | 2002 |
| 9 | Matt DeGennaro | 2,472 | 1989 |
| 10 | Tyler Lorenzen | 2,367 | 2007 |

Single game
| Rk | Player | Yards | Year | Opponent |
|---|---|---|---|---|
| 1 | Casey Cochran | 461 | 2013 | Memphis |
| 2 | **Joe Fagnano** | 446 | 2025 | Florida Atlantic |
| 3 | Dan Orlovsky | 445 | 2004 | Syracuse |
| 4 | Jack Zergiotis | 418 | 2019 | East Carolina |
| 5 | Brian Hoffmann | 413 | 1998 | Massachusetts |
| 6 | Bryant Shirreffs | 408 | 2017 | SMU |
| 7 | Cornelius Benton | 406 | 1991 | New Hampshire |
| | Bryant Shirreffs | 406 | 2017 | East Carolina |
| 9 | Cornelius Benton | 402 | 1991 | Yale |
| 10 | Dan Orlovsky | 382 | 2001 | Cincinnati |
| | Dan Orlovsky | 382 | 2004 | Murray State |

=== Passing touchdowns ===
Career
| Rk | Player | TDs | Years |
|---|---|---|---|
| 1 | Dan Orlovsky | 84 | 2001 2002 2003 2004 |
| 2 | Matt DeGennaro | 73 | 1987 1988 1989 1990 |
| | Shane Stafford | 73 | 1995 1996 1997 1998 |
| 4 | **Joe Fagnano** | 48 | 2023 2024 2025 |
| 5 | Ken Sweitzer | 37 | 1978 1979 1980 1981 |
| 6 | Rick Robustelli | 31 | 1968 1969 1970 |
| 7 | Bryant Shirreffs | 30 | 2015 2016 2017 |
| 8 | Chandler Whitmer | 25 | 2012 2013 2014 |
| 9 | Cornelius Benton | 24 | 1987 1988 1989 1990 1991 |
| | Zeke Rodgers | 24 | 1992 1993 1994 1995 |

Single season
| Rk | Player | TDs | Year |
|---|---|---|---|
| 1 | Dan Orlovsky | 33 | 2003 |
| 2 | **Joe Fagnano** | 28 | 2025 |
| 3 | Shane Stafford | 23 | 1997 |
| | Dan Orlovsky | 23 | 2004 |
| 5 | Shane Stafford | 22 | 1998 |
| 6 | Matt DeGennaro | 21 | 1990 |
| 7 | **Joe Fagnano** | 20 | 2024 |
| 8 | Dan Orlovsky | 19 | 2002 |
| | David Pindell | 19 | 2018 |
| 10 | Matt DeGennaro | 18 | 1987 |
| | Cornelius Benton | 18 | 1991 |

Single game
| Rk | Player | TDs | Year | Opponent |
|---|---|---|---|---|
| 1 | Dan Orlovsky | 5 | 2003 | Akron |
| | Dan Orlovsky | 5 | 2003 | Army |
| | Dan Orlovsky | 5 | 2004 | Murray State |
| | **Joe Fagnano** | 5 | 2024 | Merrimack |
| 5 | 18 times by 12 players | 4 | Most recent: **Joe Fagnano**, 2025 vs. UAB | |

== Rushing ==
=== Rushing yards ===
Career
| Rk | Player | Yards | Years |
|---|---|---|---|
| 1 | Donald Brown | 3,800 | 2006 2007 2008 |
| 2 | Terry Caulley | 3,187 | 2002 2003 2005 2006 |
| 3 | Jordan Todman | 3,179 | 2008 2009 2010 |
| 4 | Kevin Mensah | 2,933 | 2017 2018 2019 2021 |
| 5 | **Cam Edwards** | 2,690 | 2022 2023 2024 2025 |
| 6 | Lyle McCombs | 2,681 | 2011 2012 2013 |
| 7 | Wilbur Gilliard | 2,624 | 1992 1993 1994 1995 |
| 8 | Ed Long | 2,515 | 1991 1992 1993 1994 |
| 9 | Vinny Clements | 2,327 | 1968 1969 1970 |
| 10 | Cornell Brockington | 2,198 | 2003 2004 2005 |

Single season
| Rk | Player | Yards | Year |
|---|---|---|---|
| 1 | Donald Brown | 2,083 | 2008 |
| 2 | Jordan Todman | 1,695 | 2010 |
| 3 | Tory Taylor | 1,262 | 1995 |
| 4 | Terry Caulley | 1,247 | 2002 |
| 5 | **Cam Edwards** | 1,240 | 2025 |
| 6 | Eric Torkelson | 1,233 | 1973 |
| 7 | Cornell Brockington | 1,218 | 2004 |
| 8 | Jordan Todman | 1,188 | 2009 |
| 9 | Kevin Wesley | 1,162 | 1989 |
| 10 | Lyle McCombs | 1,151 | 2011 |

Single game
| Rk | Player | Yards | Year | Opponent |
|---|---|---|---|---|
| 1 | Nick Giaquinto | 277 | 1976 | Holy Cross |
| 2 | Vinny Clements | 273 | 1969 | Rhode Island |
| 3 | Kevin Wesley | 272 | 1989 | Massachusetts |
| 4 | Donald Brown | 261 | 2009 | Buffalo |
| 5 | Tory Taylor | 256 | 1995 | Boston University |
| 6 | Wilbur Gilliard | 252 | 1993 | Richmond |
| 7 | Gary DuBose | 246 | 1984 | Massachusetts |
| 8 | Terry Caulley | 234 | 2003 | Buffalo |
| 9 | Kevin Wesley | 223 | 1989 | Boston University |
| 10 | Jordan Todman | 222 | 2010 | Pittsburgh |

=== Rushing touchdowns ===
Career
| Rk | Player | TDs | Years |
|---|---|---|---|
| 1 | Wilbur Gilliard | 34 | 1992 1993 1994 1995 |
| 2 | Donald Brown | 33 | 2006 2007 2008 |
| 3 | Jordan Todman | 31 | 2008 2009 2010 |
| | Terry Caulley | 31 | 2002 2003 2005 2006 |
| 5 | **Cam Edwards** | 27 | 2022 2023 2024 2025 |
| 6 | Taber Small | 26 | 1999 2000 2001 |
| 7 | Walt Trojanowski | 25 | 1942 1945 1946 1949 |
| | Cornell Brockington | 25 | 2003 2004 2005 |
| 9 | Ed Long | 24 | 1991 1992 1993 1994 |
| 10 | Vinny Clements | 23 | 1968 1969 1970 |

Single season
| Rk | Player | TDs | Year |
|---|---|---|---|
| 1 | Walt Trojanowski | 22 | 1945 |
| 2 | Donald Brown | 18 | 2008 |
| 3 | Wilbur Gilliard | 17 | 1993 |
| 4 | Terry Caulley | 15 | 2002 |
| | **Cam Edwards** | 15 | 2025 |
| 6 | Arthur Williams | 14 | 1926 |
| | Taber Small | 14 | 1999 |
| | Jordan Todman | 14 | 2009 |
| | Andre Dixon | 14 | 2009 |
| | Jordan Todman | 14 | 2010 |

== Receiving ==
=== Receptions ===
Career
| Rk | Player | Rec | Years |
|---|---|---|---|
| 1 | Mark Didio | 239 | 1988 1989 1990 1991 |
| 2 | Alex Davis | 200 | 1989 1990 1991 1992 |
| 3 | Glenn Antrum | 186 | 1985 1986 1987 1988 |
| 4 | Noel Thomas | 183 | 2013 2014 2015 2016 |
| 5 | John Fitzsimmons | 173 | 1996 1997 1998 1999 |
| 6 | Geremy Davis | 165 | 2011 2012 2013 2014 |
| 7 | David Dunn | 161 | 1985 1986 1987 |
| 8 | Brian Kozlowski | 159 | 1989 1990 1991 1992 |
| 9 | **Skyler Bell** | 151 | 2024 2025 |
| 10 | Carl Bond | 145 | 1995 1996 1997 1998 |

Single season
| Rk | Player | Rec | Year |
|---|---|---|---|
| 1 | **Skyler Bell** | 101 | 2025 |
| 2 | Noel Thomas | 100 | 2016 |
| 2 | Mark Didio | 88 | 1991 |
| 4 | Mark Didio | 78 | 1990 |
| 5 | Glenn Antrum | 77 | 1988 |
| 6 | Alex Davis | 72 | 1991 |
| 7 | Geremy Davis | 71 | 2013 |
| 8 | Keron Henry | 67 | 2004 |
| 9 | David Dunn | 66 | 1987 |
| 10 | Shaun Feldeisen | 65 | 2003 |

Single game
| Rk | Player | Rec | Year | Opponent |
|---|---|---|---|---|
| 1 | Geremy Davis | 15 | 2013 | Memphis |
| 2 | Keith Hugger | 14 | 1981 | Delaware |
| | Noel Thomas | 14 | 2016 | Syracuse |
| | **Skyler Bell** | 14 | 2025 | Ball State |
| 5 | Vin Russell | 13 | 1970 | Holy Cross |
| | Mark Didio | 13 | 1990 | Rhode Island |
| | Alex Davis | 13 | 1991 | Rhode Island |
| | Alex Davis | 13 | 1991 | Delaware |
| 9 | Mark Didio | 12 | 1991 | Boston University |
| | Noel Thomas | 12 | 2016 | South Florida |

=== Receiving yards ===
Career
| Rk | Player | Yards | Years |
|---|---|---|---|
| 1 | Mark Didio | 3,535 | 1988 1989 1990 1991 |
| 2 | John Fitzsimmons | 2,841 | 1996 1997 1998 1999 2000 |
| 3 | Carl Bond | 2,770 | 1995 1996 1997 1998 |
| 4 | Alex Davis | 2,567 | 1989 1990 1991 1992 |
| 5 | Glenn Antrum | 2,552 | 1985 1986 1987 1988 |
| 6 | Geremy Davis | 2,292 | 2011 2012 2013 2014 |
| 7 | David Dunn | 2,285 | 1985 1986 1987 |
| 8 | Noel Thomas | 2,235 | 2013 2014 2015 2016 |
| 9 | **Skyler Bell** | 2,138 | 2024 2025 |
| 10 | Keith Hugger | 1,961 | 1979 1980 1981 1982 |

Single season
| Rk | Player | Yards | Year |
|---|---|---|---|
| 1 | Mark Didio | 1,354 | 1991 |
| 2 | **Skyler Bell** | 1,278 | 2025 |
| 3 | Noel Thomas | 1,179 | 2016 |
| 4 | Carl Bond | 1,178 | 1997 |
| 5 | Mark Didio | 1,153 | 1990 |
| 6 | Keith Hugger | 1,145 | 1981 |
| 7 | Glenn Antrum | 1,130 | 1988 |
| 8 | Geremy Davis | 1,085 | 2013 |
| 9 | Reggie Eccleston | 1,081 | 1980 |
| 10 | John Fitzsimmons | 1,040 | 1998 |

Single game
| Rk | Player | Yards | Year | Opponent |
|---|---|---|---|---|
| 1 | Keith Hugger | 236 | 1981 | Delaware |
| 2 | Reggie Eccleston | 229 | 1980 | Rhode Island |
| | Mark Didio | 229 | 1991 | Boston University |
| 4 | Dak Newton | 222 | 1996 | Villanova |
| 5 | Geremy Davis | 207 | 2013 | Memphis |
| 6 | Glenn Antrum | 193 | 1988 | Richmond |
| 7 | Vin Russell | 186 | 1970 | Holy Cross |
| 8 | Mark Didio | 185 | 1991 | Richmond |
| 9 | Mark Didio | 182 | 1990 | Rhode Island |
| 10 | Shakim Phillips | 178 | 2013 | Maryland |

=== Receiving touchdowns ===
Career
| Rk | Player | TDs | Years |
|---|---|---|---|
| 1 | Alex Davis | 24 | 1989 1990 1991 1992 |
| 2 | John Fitzsimmons | 23 | 1996 1997 1998 1999 2000 |
| 3 | Carl Bond | 22 | 1995 1996 1997 1998 |
| 4 | Mark Didio | 21 | 1988 1989 1990 1991 |
| 5 | **Skyler Bell** | 18 | 2024 2025 |
| 6 | David Dunn | 16 | 1985 1986 1987 |
| 7 | Ken Miller | 15 | 1978 1979 1980 1981 |
| 8 | Glenn Antrum | 14 | 1985 1986 1987 1988 |

Single season
| Rk | Player | TDs | Year |
|---|---|---|---|
| 1 | **Skyler Bell** | 13 | 2025 |
| 2 | Carl Bond | 11 | 1998 |
| 3 | Mark Didio | 10 | 1990 |
| 4 | Reggie Eccleston | 9 | 1980 |
| | Alex Davis | 9 | 1990 |
| | Tory Taylor | 9 | 1997 |
| | John Fitzsimmons | 9 | 2000 |
| | O'Neil Wilson | 9 | 2003 |

Single game
| Rk | Player | TDs | Year | Opponent |
|---|---|---|---|---|
| 1 | Reggie Eccleston | 4 | 1980 | Rhode Island |
| 2 | Joe Bettencourt | 3 | 1950 | Ohio Wesleyan |
| | Mark Didio | 3 | 1991 | Boston University |
| | Dak Newton | 3 | 1996 | Villanova |
| | **Skyler Bell** | 3 | 2024 | Buffalo |
| | **Skyler Bell** | 3 | 2025 | UAB |

== Total offense ==
Total offense is the sum of passing and rushing statistics. It does not include receiving or returns.

=== Total offense yards ===
Career
| Rk | Player | Yards | Years |
|---|---|---|---|
| 1 | Dan Orlovsky | 10,421 | 2001 2002 2003 2004 |
| 2 | Matt DeGennaro | 9,269 | 1987 1988 1989 1990 |
| 3 | Shane Stafford | 8,829 | 1995 1996 1997 1998 |
| 4 | Bryant Shirreffs | 7,404 | 2015 2016 2017 |
| 5 | Ken Sweitzer | 6,126 | 1978 1979 1980 1981 |
| 6 | **Joe Fagnano** | 5,475 | 2023 2024 2025 |
| 7 | Chandler Whitmer | 4,849 | 2012 2013 2014 |
| 8 | David Pindell | 4,319 | 2017 2018 |
| 9 | Cornelius Benton | 4,089 | 1987 1988 1989 1990 1991 |
| 10 | Peter Lane | 4,075 | 1985 1986 |

Single season
| Rk | Player | Yards | Year |
|---|---|---|---|
| 1 | **Joe Fagnano** | 3,579 | 2025 |
| 2 | Dan Orlovsky | 3,444 | 2003 |
| 3 | Dan Orlovsky | 3,313 | 2004 |
| 4 | Cornelius Benton | 2,758 | 1991 |
| 5 | Shane Stafford | 2,729 | 1997 |
| 6 | Tyler Lorenzen | 2,695 | 2007 |
| 7 | Bryant Shirreffs | 2,581 | 2015 |
| 8 | Matt DeGennaro | 2,681 | 1988 |
| 9 | Ken Sweitzer | 2,571 | 1981 |
| 10 | Chandler Whitmer | 2,503 | 2012 |

Single game
| Rk | Player | Yards | Year | Opponent |
|---|---|---|---|---|
| 1 | Casey Cochran | 466 | 2013 | Memphis |
| 2 | Bryant Shirreffs | 465 | 2015 | USF |
| 3 | Brian Hoffmann | 434 | 1998 | Massachusetts |
| 4 | Cornelius Benton | 433 | 1991 | New Hampshire |
| 5 | Cornelius Benton | 432 | 1991 | Yale |
| 6 | **Joe Fagnano** | 425 | 2025 | Florida Atlantic |
| 7 | Bryant Shirreffs | 424 | 2017 | East Carolina |
| 8 | Jack Zergiotis | 418 | 2019 | East Carolina |
| 9 | Dan Orlovsky | 412 | 2004 | Syracuse |
| 10 | Dan Orlovsky | 398 | 2004 | Murray State |

=== Touchdowns responsible for ===
The NCAA officially classifies the combination of passing and rushing touchdowns as "touchdowns responsible for".

Career
| Rk | Player | TDs | Years |
|---|---|---|---|
| 1 | Dan Orlovsky | 90 | 2001 2002 2003 2004 |
| 2 | Matt DeGennaro | 83 | 1987 1988 1989 1990 |
| 3 | Shane Stafford | 73 | 1995 1996 1997 1998 |
| 4 | Ken Sweitzer | 52 | 1978 1979 1980 1981 |
| | **Joe Fagnano** | 52 | 2023 2024 2025 |
| 6 | Donald Brown | 35 | 2006 2007 2008 |
| | Bryant Shirreffs | 35 | 2015 2016 2017 |
| | Wilbur Gilliard | 35 | 1992 1993 1994 1995 |
| 9 | Terry Caulley | 34 | 2002 2003 2005 2006 |

Single season
| Rk | Player | TDs | Year |
|---|---|---|---|
| 1 | Dan Orlovsky | 33 | 2003 |
| 2 | **Joe Fagnano** | 31 | 2025 |
| 3 | Shane Stafford | 23 | 1997 |
| | Dan Orlovsky | 23 | 2002 |
| | Dan Orlovsky | 23 | 2004 |
| 6 | Walt Trojanowski | 22 | 1945 |
| | Shane Stafford | 22 | 1998 |
| 8 | Matt DeGennaro | 21 | 1987 |
| | Matt DeGennaro | 21 | 1988 |
| | Matt DeGennaro | 21 | 1990 |
| | **Joe Fagnano** | 21 | 2024 |

== Defense ==
=== Interceptions ===
Career
| Rk | Player | Ints | Years |
|---|---|---|---|
| 1 | Matt Latham | 18 | 1982 1983 1984 |
| 2 | Lenny King | 17 | 1955 1956 1957 |
| | Darrell Wilson | 17 | 1976 1978 1979 1980 |
| 4 | Ted Walton | 14 | 1976 1977 1978 1979 |
| | Mark Chapman | 14 | 1989 1990 1991 1992 |
| 6 | Robert Vaughn | 13 | 2006 2007 2008 2009 |
| 7 | Justin Perkins | 12 | 2001 2002 2003 2004 |
| 8 | Bob Warren | 11 | 1969 1970 1971 |

Single season
| Rk | Player | Ints | Year |
|---|---|---|---|
| 1 | Lenny King | 10 | 1955 |
| 2 | Darrell Wilson | 8 | 1980 |
| | Matt Latham | 8 | 1983 |
| | Mark Chapman | 8 | 1992 |
| | Jamar Summers | 8 | 2015 |
| 6 | Rich Fenton | 7 | 1974 |
| | Robert Vaughn | 7 | 2007 |

Single game
| Rk | Player | Ints | Year | Opponent |
|---|---|---|---|---|
| 1 | Leo Pinsky | 3 | 1944 | Norwich |
| | Don Ross | 3 | 1949 | Rhode Island |
| | Rich Fenton | 3 | 1973 | New Hampshire |
| | Marty Bird | 3 | 1974 | New Hampshire |
| | Matt Latham | 3 | 1984 | Lehigh |
| | Darius Butler | 3 | 2005 | Army |
| | Andrew Adams | 3 | 2014 | UCF |
| | **Cam Chadwick** | 3 | 2025 | UAB |

=== Tackles ===
Career
| Rk | Player | Tackles | Years |
|---|---|---|---|
| 1 | John Dorsey | 495 | 1980 1981 1982 1983 |
| 2 | Lawrence Wilson | 449 | 2007 2008 2009 2010 |
| 3 | Jackson Mitchell | 438 | 2020 2021 2022 2023 |
| 4 | Troy Ashley | 428 | 1986 1987 1988 1989 |
| 5 | Maurice Lloyd | 412 | 2001 2002 2003 2004 |
| 6 | Mike Jansen | 394 | 1985 1986 1987 |
| 7 | Vernon Hargreaves | 393 | 1981 1982 1983 |
| 8 | Alfred Fincher | 357 | 2001 2002 2003 2004 |
| 9 | Obi Melifonwu | 351 | 2013 2014 2015 2016 |
| 10 | Paul Duckworth | 344 | 1990 1991 1992 1993 |

Single season
| Rk | Player | Tackles | Year |
|---|---|---|---|
| 1 | John Dorsey | 184 | 1983 |
| 2 | Don Thompson | 154 | 1974 |
| | John Dorsey | 154 | 1982 |
| 4 | Vernon Hargreaves | 149 | 1982 |
| 5 | John Dorsey | 144 | 1981 |
| 6 | Troy Ashley | 140 | 1989 |
| | Alfred Fincher | 140 | 2004 |
| | Lawrence Wilson | 140 | 2009 |
| | Jackson Mitchell | 140 | 2022 |
| 10 | Mike Jansen | 139 | 1986 |

Single game
| Rk | Player | Tackles | Year | Opponent |
|---|---|---|---|---|
| 1 | Jeff Thomas | 24 | 1980 | Massachusetts |
| | John Dorsey | 24 | 1981 | Rhode Island |
| | Troy Ashley | 24 | 1989 | Massachusetts |
| 4 | John Dorsey | 23 | 1983 | Rutgers |
| 5 | John Dorsey | 22 | 1982 | Colgate |
| | Paul Duckworth | 22 | 1993 | Towson State |
| 7 | Alfred Fincher | 21 | 2004 | West Virginia |

=== Sacks ===
Career
| Rk | Player | Sacks | Years |
|---|---|---|---|
| 1 | Trevardo Williams | 30.5 | 2009 2010 2011 2012 |
| 2 | Mark Michaels | 27.0 | 1982 1983 1984 1985 |
| 3 | Cody Brown | 24.0 | 2005 2006 2007 2008 |
| 4 | Uyi Osunde | 22.5 | 1999 2000 2001 2002 2003 |
| 5 | Lindsey Witten | 22.0 | 2006 2007 2008 2009 |
| 6 | Rob Belcuore | 21.5 | 1989 1990 1991 1992 |
| 7 | Steve Beal | 19.0 | 1976 1977 1978 1979 |
| | Tyler King | 19.0 | 2001 2002 2003 2004 |
| 9 | Paul Duckworth | 17.0 | 1990 1991 1992 1993 |
| 10 | Mike Rembish | 16.0 | 1987 1988 1989 1990 |

Single season
| Rk | Player | Sacks | Year |
|---|---|---|---|
| 1 | Steve Beal | 13.0 | 1978 |
| | Mark Michaels | 13.0 | 1984 |
| 3 | Trevardo Williams | 12.5 | 2011 |
| 4 | Lindsey Witten | 11.5 | 2009 |
| 5 | Bruce Bourgoin | 11.0 | 1993 |
| | Uyi Osunde | 11.0 | 2003 |
| | Cody Brown | 11.0 | 2008 |
| 8 | **Bryun Parham** | 10.5 | 2025 |
| 9 | Paul Mariano | 10.0 | 1975 |
| | Mike Rembish | 10.0 | 1990 |

== Kicking ==
=== Field goals made ===
Career
| Rk | Player | FGs | Years |
|---|---|---|---|
| 1 | Dave Teggart | 67 | 2008 2009 2010 2011 |
| 2 | Matt Nuzie | 45 | 2003 2004 2005 2006 |
| 3 | **Chris Freeman** | 43 | 2024 2025 |
| 4 | Bobby Puyol | 39 | 2013 2014 2015 2016 |
| 5 | Domingos Carlos | 36 | 1981 1982 1983 |
| 6 | Tony Ciaravino | 33 | 2006 2007 2008 |
| 7 | Nick Sosik | 31 | 1990 1991 1992 |
| 8 | David DeArmas | 30 | 1993 1994 1995 |
| 9 | Marc Hickok | 27 | 1999 2000 2001 2002 |

Single season
| Rk | Player | FGs | Year |
|---|---|---|---|
| 1 | Dave Teggart | 25 | 2010 |
| 2 | **Chris Freeman** | 23 | 2025 |
| 3 | Tony Ciaravino | 22 | 2007 |
| | Dave Teggart | 22 | 2011 |
| 5 | Matt Nuzie | 20 | 2004 |
| | **Chris Freeman** | 20 | 2024 |
| 7 | David DeArmas | 17 | 1995 |
| 8 | Bobby Puyol | 16 | 2015 |
| 9 | Mark Carter | 15 | 1986 |
| 10 | Dave Teggart | 14 | 2009 |

Single game
| Rk | Player | FGs | Year | Opponent |
|---|---|---|---|---|
| 1 | Domingos Carlos | 4 | 1982 | New Hampshire |
| | Mark Carter | 4 | 1986 | Northeastern |
| | Mark Carter | 4 | 1986 | New Hampshire |
| | David DeArmas | 4 | 1995 | Yale |
| | Matt Nuzie | 4 | 2004 | Toledo |
| | Dave Teggart | 4 | 2008 | Cincinnati |
| | Dave Teggart | 4 | 2010 | South Florida |
| | Dave Teggart | 4 | 2011 | Cincinnati |
| | **Chris Freeman** | 4 | 2024 | Buffalo |

=== Field goal percentage ===
Career
| Rk | Player | FG% | Years |
|---|---|---|---|
| 1 | Dave Teggart | 90.5% | 2008 2009 2010 2011 |
| 2 | **Chris Freeman** | 82.7% | 2024 2025 |
| 3 | Bobby Puyol | 76.5% | 2013 2014 2015 2016 |
| 4 | Tony Ciaravino | 75.0% | 2006 2007 2008 |
| | Noe Ruelas | 75.0% | 2022 2023 |

Single season
| Rk | Player | FG% | Year |
|---|---|---|---|
| 1 | Bobby Puyol | 88.9% | 2015 |
| 2 | **Chris Freeman** | 88.5% | 2025 |
| 3 | Dave Teggart | 86.7% | 2008 |
| 4 | Tony Ciaravino | 81.5% | 2007 |
| 5 | Dave Teggart | 80.6% | 2010 |
