= Kevin Mensah =

Kevin Mensah may refer to:

- Kevin Mensah (footballer) (born 1991)
- Kevin Mensah (American football) (born 1998)
