= 2014 Cincinnati Bearcats football team =

American college football season

2014 Cincinnati Bearcats football

The American co-champion

Military Bowl, L 17–33 vs. Virginia Tech
- Conference: American Athletic Conference
- Record: 9–4 (7–1 The American)
- Head coach: Tommy Tuberville (2nd season)
- Offensive coordinator: Eddie Gran (2nd season)
- Offensive scheme: Spread
- Co-defensive coordinators: Robert Prunty (2nd season); Hank Hughes (1st season)
- Base defense: 4–3
- Home stadium: Paul Brown Stadium

2014 American Athletic Conference football standings
	Conf.			Overall
Team	W		L	W		L
No. 25 Memphis +	7	–	1	10	–	3
Cincinnati +	7	–	1	9	–	4
UCF +	7	–	1	9	–	4
East Carolina	5	–	3	8	–	5
Houston	5	–	3	8	–	5
Temple	4	–	4	6	–	6
South Florida	3	–	5	4	–	8
Tulane	2	–	6	3	–	9
Tulsa	2	–	6	2	–	10
UConn	1	–	7	2	–	10
SMU	1	–	7	1	–	11
+ – Conference co-champions; Rankings from AP Poll

The 2014 Cincinnati Bearcats football team represented the University of Cincinnati in the 2014 NCAA Division I FBS football season. The team played its home games at Paul Brown Stadium in Cincinnati, Ohio due to the renovation at Nippert Stadium, which was completed at the start of the 2015 football season. The Bearcats were led by second-year head coach Tommy Tuberville. They finished the season 9–4, 7–1 in AAC play to finish in a three way tie for the America Athletic championship. They were invited to the Military Bowl where they lost to Virginia Tech.

== Schedule ==
Date	Time	Opponent	Site	TV	Result	Attendance
September 12	7:00 pm	Toledo*	Paul Brown Stadium; Cincinnati, OH	ESPNU	W 58–34	31,912
September 20	7:00 pm	Miami (OH)*^{†}	Paul Brown Stadium; Cincinnati, OH (Victory Bell)	CBSSN	W 31–24	41,926
September 27	6:00 pm	at No. 22 Ohio State*	Ohio Stadium; Columbus, OH	BTN	L 28–50	108,362
October 4	7:00 pm	Memphis	Paul Brown Stadium; Cincinnati, OH (rivalry)	CBSSN	L 14–41	25,456
October 11	12:00 pm	at Miami (FL)*	Sun Life Stadium; Miami Gardens, FL	ACCRSN	L 34–55	43,953
October 18	3:30 pm	at SMU	Gerald J. Ford Stadium; University Park, TX	CBSSN	W 41–3	16,849
October 24	7:00 pm	South Florida	Paul Brown Stadium; Cincinnati, OH	ESPN2	W 34–17	30,024
October 31	8:00 pm	at Tulane	Yulman Stadium; New Orleans, LA	ESPN2	W 38–14	21,414
November 13	7:00 pm	East Carolina	Paul Brown Stadium; Cincinnati, OH	ESPN2	W 54–46	19,113
November 22	8:00 pm	at UConn	Rentschler Field; East Hartford, CT	CBSSN	W 41–0	24,012
November 29	12:00 pm	at Temple	Lincoln Financial Field; Philadelphia, PA	ESPNews	W 14–6	21,255
December 6	12:00 pm	Houston	Paul Brown Stadium; Cincinnati, OH	ESPN	W 38–31	24,606
December 27	1:00 pm	vs. Virginia Tech*	Navy–Marine Corps Memorial Stadium; Annapolis, MD (Military Bowl)	ESPN	L 17–33	34,277
*Non-conference game; ^{†}Homecoming; Rankings from AP Poll released prior to game; All times are in Eastern time

Schedule source:

== Game summaries ==
=== Toledo ===
Team	1	2	3	4	Total
Rockets	0	14	17	3	34
• Bearcats	20	21	0	17	58

- Location: Cincinnati, OH
- Game start: 7:00 p.m.
- Game attendance: 31,912
- Referee: Jeff Maconaghy
- TV announcers (ESPNU): Eamon McAnaney, Dan Hawkins, Niki Noto

=== Miami (Ohio) ===
119th Battle for the Victory Bell

Team	1	2	3	4	Total
RedHawks	7	7	7	3	24
• Bearcats	7	17	7	0	31

- Location: Cincinnati, OH
- Game start: 7:00 p.m.
- Game attendance: 41,926
- Referee: Mark Kluczynski
- TV announcers (CBSSN): Dave Ryan, Corey Chavous, Lauren Gardner

=== Ohio State ===
Team	1	2	3	4	Total
Bearcats	7	14	7	0	28
• #22 Buckeyes	23	7	13	7	50

- Location: Columbus, OH
- Game start: 6:00 p.m.
- Game attendance: 108,362
- Referee: Daniel Capron
- TV announcers (BTN): Thom Brennaman, Glen Mason, Lisa Byington

=== Memphis ===
Team	1	2	3	4	Total
• Tigers	24	3	14	0	41
Bearcats	7	0	7	0	14

- Location: Cincinnati, OH
- Game start: 7:00 p.m.
- Game attendance: 25,456
- Referee: Ed Ardito
- TV announcers (CBSSN): Dave Ryan, Corey Chavous, Lauren Gardner

=== Miami (FL) ===
Team	1	2	3	4	Total
Bearcats	7	3	3	21	34
• Hurricanes	14	10	17	14	55

- Location: Miami Gardens, FL
- Game start: 12:00 p.m.
- Game attendance: 43,953
- Referee: John McDaid
- TV announcers (ACCRSN): Chip Carey, Jim Grobe, Hans Heiserer

=== SMU ===
Team	1	2	3	4	Total
• Bearcats	6	22	3	10	41
Mustangs	3	0	0	0	3

- Location: University Park, TX
- Game start: 2:30
- Game attendance: 16,849
- Referee: Todd LaPenta
- TV announcers (CBSSN): Dave Ryan, Corey Chavous, Lauren Gardner

=== South Florida ===
Team	1	2	3	4	Total
Bulls	3	0	0	14	17
• Bearcats	10	10	0	14	34

- Location: Cincinnati, OH
- Game start: 7:00 p.m.
- Game attendance: 30,024
- Referee: Michael Roche
- TV announcers (ESPN2): Dave LaMont, Ray Bentley

=== Tulane ===
Team	1	2	3	4	Total
• Bearcats	10	14	7	7	38
Green Wave	0	0	14	0	14

- Location: New Orleans, LA
- Game start: 7:00 p.m.
- Game attendance: 21,414
- Referee: Tracy Jones
- TV announcers (ESPN2): Dave Flemming, Danny Kanell, Allison Williams

=== East Carolina ===
Team	1	2	3	4	Total
Pirates	6	14	7	19	46
• Bearcats	14	17	7	16	54

- Location: Cincinnati, OH
- Game start: 7:00 p.m.
- Game attendance: 19,113
- Game weather: 27 F
- Referee: John McDaid
- TV announcers (ESPN2): Mark Neely, Gene Chizik, Kayce Smith

=== UConn ===
Team	1	2	3	4	Total
• Bearcats	7	20	14	0	41
Huskies	0	0	0	0	0

- Location: East Hartford, CT
- Game start: 8:00 p.m.
- Game attendance: 24,012
- Referee: Michael Roche
- TV announcers (CBSSN): Dave Ryan, Corey Chavous, Lauren Gardner

=== Temple ===
Team	1	2	3	4	Total
• Bearcats	0	14	0	0	14
Owls	3	0	3	0	6

- Location: Philadelphia, PA
- Game start: 12:00 p.m.
- Game attendance: 21,255
- Referee: Tracy Jones
- TV announcers (ESPNews): Wayne Randazzo, Brian Kinchen

=== Houston ===
Team	1	2	3	4	Total
Cougars	7	3	7	14	31
• Bearcats	7	14	14	3	38

- Location: Cincinnati, OH
- Game start: 12:00 p.m.
- Game attendance: 24,606
- Referee: Michael Roche
- TV announcers (ESPN): Sean McDonough, Chris Spielman, Todd McShay

=== Virginia Tech ===
Team	1	2	3	4	Total
Bearcats	7	3	0	7	17
• Hokies	7	6	14	6	33

- Location: Annapolis, MD
- Game start: 1:00 p.m.
- Game attendance: 34,277
- Referee: Kevin Stine
- TV announcers (ESPN/ESPN Radio): Beth Mowins, Joey Galloway, Paul Carcaterra/Eamon McAnaney, Jay Walker, Jack Arute

== Personnel ==
2014 Cincinnati Bearcats football team roster
Players
Coaches
Offense

Pos.	#	Name	Class
WR	2	Mekale McKay	Jr
WR	3	Johnny Holton	Jr
QB	4	Munchie Legaux	Sr
RB	7	Tion Green (injured)	Jr
WR	8	Casey Gladney	Jr
QB	10	Hayden Moore	Fr
TE	10	Jake Golic	Sr
QB	11	Gunner Kiel	So
QB	12	Jarred Evans (S)	Jr
WR	15	Chris Moore	Jr
QB	16	Michael Colosimo	Jr
TE	18	Tyler Cogswell	So
WR	19	Shaq Washington	Jr
WR	20	Tshumbi Johnson (injured)	Fr
RB	21	Rod Moore	Sr
RB	23	Hosey Williams	Sr
RB	25	Rob Rice (injured)	Jr
RB	26	Bobby Brown	Fr
RB	27	Mike Boone	Fr
RB	30	Chad Banschbach	Fr
FB	38	Lindsay Crook	Fr
FB	39	EJ Junior	So
OL	54	Luke Callahan	Fr
OL	56	Dominic Mainello	Sr
OL	58	Chad West	Jr
OL	59	Deyshawn Bond	So
OL	62	Cory Keebler (injured)	Sr
OL	63	Chris Ferguson	Fr
OL	64	Will Steur	Fr
OL	65	Tyreek Burwell	Sr
OL	66	David Niehaus	So
OL	67	Kyle Williamson (injured)	So
OL	68	Jeff Duncan	Fr
OL	69	Branden Gordan	Jr
OL	69	Dominic Mainello	Sr
OL	71	Eric Lefeld	Sr
OL	72	Garrett Campbell	Sr
OL	73	Ryan Leahy	So
OL	74	Justin Murray	Jr
OL	75	Kevin Schloemer	Sr
OL	76	Korey Cunningham	Fr
OL	77	John Kurtz	Fr
OL	78	Parker Ehinger	Jr
OL	79	Ryan Stout	Fr
WR	80	Alex Chism	Jr
TE	81	DJ Dowdy	So
WR	82	Max Morrison	Jr
WR	84	Nate Cole	So
TE	85	Jeremy Dolin	Sr
WR	87	Justin Sawmiller	Sr
TE	88	Shai Alonzo	So

Defense

Pos.	#	Name	Class
LB	1	Jeff Luc	Sr
LB	2	Tyrell Gilbert	Fr
DB	3	Howard Wilder	Sr
S	5	Mike Tyson	So
CB	6	Jeff Mundy	So
LB	7	Aaron Brown	Fr
S	8	Adrian Witty	Sr
S	10	Darren Dotson	Sr
CB	11	John James (injured)	Jr
CB	12	Leviticus Payne	Jr
CB	13	Grant Coleman	So
CB	14	J.J. Pinckney	Fr
S	17	Jeremy Graves (injured)	Jr
S	20	Carter Jacobs	Fr
CB	21	Davon Witherspoon	Fr
CB	22	Zach Edwards	So
LB	23	Eric Wilson	So
CB	25	Alex Thomas (S)	Fr
S	29	Andre Jones	So
CB	30	Chris Murphy	Fr
CB	32	Linden Stephens	Fr
LB	38	Mason Antoun	Jr
LB	39	Lindsay Crook	Fr
LB	40	Kevin Brown	Jr
LB	41	Kevin Hyland	Jr
LB	43	Nick Temple	Sr
DE	47	Landon Brazile	Fr
LB	48	Kevin Mouhon	Fr
DL	50	Alex Pace	So
DE	51	Kimoni Fitz	Fr
DT	52	Keith Minor	Fr
LB	53	Franklin Bruscianelli	So
DT	54	Ja'Merez Bowen	Fr
DE	56	Mark Wilson	Fr
LB	57	Clemente Casseus	Sr
LB	58	Trevor Ginn	Fr
DT	59	Beau Harmon	Fr
DL	70	Brandon Mitchell	Jr
DT	90	Camaron Beard	Sr
DT	91	Hakeem Allonce	Sr
DL	92	Silverberry Mouhon	Jr
DE	93	Brad Harrah	Sr
DT	94	Chris Burton	So
DE	95	Terrell Hartsfield	Sr
DT	96	Cortez Broughton	Fr
DT	97	Sione Tongamoa	Fr
DE	99	Jerrell Jordan	Sr

Special teams

Pos.	#	Name	Class
PK	14	Tony Miliano	Sr
P	24	John Lloyd	Sr
DS	34	Tyler Hill	Fr
PK	55	Andrew Gantz	Fr
P	58	Sam Geraci	Fr
DS	61	Kirk Willis	Jr

Head coach

- Tommy Tuberville

Coordinators/assistant coaches

- Eddie Gran
  Offensive coordinator
- Hank Hughes
  Co-defensive coordinator/linebackers
- Robert Prunty
  Associate head coach/co-defensive coordinator/defensive line
- Steve Clinkscale
  Linebackers
- Darren Hiller
  Offensive line
- Darin Hinshaw
  Passing game coordinator/quarterbacks
- Jeff Koonz
  Safeties
- Marc Nudelberg
  Special teams/tight ends
- Blake Rolan
  Wide receivers
- Joe Walker
  Director of football strength & conditioning

Legend

- (C) Team captain
- (S) Suspended
- (I) Ineligible
- Injured
- Redshirt

Roster
Last update: November 11, 2014

=== Depth chart ===
Defense

FS
Zach Edwards
Carter Jacobs

WLB	MLB	SLB
Brandon Bell	Jeff Luc	Leviticus Payne
Eric Wilson	Kevin Hyland	Kevin Brown

SS
Andre Jones
Mike Tyson

CB
Grant Coleman
Aaron Brown

DE	DT	DT	DE
Terrell Hartfield	Brad Harrah	Camaron Beard	Silverberry Mouhon
Mark Wilson	Brandon Mitchell	Alex Pace	Jerrell Jordan

CB
Howard Wilder
Linden Stephens

Offense

WR
Mekale McKay
Alex Chisum

WR
Shaq Washington
Casey Gladney

LT	LG	C	RG	RT
Eric Lefeld	Ryan Leahy	Deyshawn Bond	Parker Ehinger	Justin Murray
Korey Cunningham	Kevin Schloemer	Dominic Mainello	Tyreek Burwell	Chad West

TE
DJ Dowdy
Jake Golic

WR
Chris Moore
Johnny Holton

QB
Gunner Kiel
Munchie Legaux

Special teams
PK Andrew Gantz
P Sam Geraci
KR Johnny Holton, Casey Gladney
PR Shaq Washington, Casey Gladney
LS Kirk Willis
H Sam Geraci

RB
Rod Moore
Mike Boone

== Awards and milestones ==
=== American Athletic Conference honors ===
==== Offensive player of the week ====
- Week 3: Gunner Kiel
- Week 5: Chris Moore
- Week 12: Gunner Kiel

==== Defensive player of the week ====
- Week 13: Jeff Luc
- Week 14: Nick Temple

==== Special Teams player of the week ====
- Week 3: Sam Geraci
- Week 8: Andrew Gantz
- Week 9: Andrew Gantz
- Week 12: Andrew Gantz

==== American Athletic Conference All-Conference First Team ====
- Eric Lefeld, OT
- Parker Ehinger, OG
- Terrell Hartsfield, DL
- Jeff Luc, LB

==== American Athletic Conference All-Conference Second Team ====
- Andrew Gantz, K

==== American Athletic Conference All-Conference Honorable Mention ====
- Gunner Kiel, QB
- Nick Temple, LB
