= Nick DeGennaro =

American football player (born 2000)

No. 88 – Washington Commanders
- Position: Wide receiver
- Roster status: Practice squad

Personal information
- Born: December 29, 2000 (age 25); Old Bridge, New Jersey, U.S.
- Listed height: 6 ft 0 in (1.83 m)
- Listed weight: 196 lb (89 kg)

Career information
- High school: Hun School (Princeton, New Jersey)
- College: Maryland (2020–2021); Richmond (2022–2024); James Madison (2025)
- NFL draft: 2026: undrafted

Career history
- New England Patriots (2026)*; Washington Commanders (2026–present)*
- * Offseason or practice squad member only

Awards and highlights
- Second-team All-CAA (2023); Third-team All-CAA (2024)
- Stats at Pro Football Reference

Nick DeGennaro (born December 29, 2000) is an American professional football wide receiver for the Washington Commanders of the National Football League (NFL). He played college football for the Maryland Terrapins, Richmond Spiders and James Madison Dukes.

== Early life ==
DeGennaro was born December 29, 2000, in Old Bridge, New Jersey. He attended the Hun School of Princeton in Princeton, New Jersey.

== College career ==
DeGennaro played college football for the Maryland Terrapins from 2020 to 2021, Richmond Spiders from 2022 to 2024 and James Madison Dukes in 2025. At Maryland he played in seven games, where he caught three passes for 42 yards. DeGennaro entered the transfer portal on January 4, 2022. On February 1, he committed to Richmond.

In three seasons, DeGennaro played in 35 games and started in 26, recording 162 receptions for 2,002 yards and 16 touchdowns. In 2023, he earned second-team All-Coastal Athletic Association Football Conference honors and in 2024, he was named to the third-team All-CAA squad. DeGennaro entered the transfer portal again on December 9, 2024.

On January 15, 2026, DeGennaro committed to James Madison. In 14 games, he had 28 catches for 500 yards and five touchdowns. DeGennaro was invited to the 2026 East–West Shrine Bowl.

== Professional career ==
Pre-draft measurables
| Height | Weight | Arm length | Hand span | Wingspan | 40-yard dash | 10-yard split | 20-yard split | 20-yard shuttle | Three-cone drill | Vertical jump | Broad jump | Bench press |
|---|---|---|---|---|---|---|---|---|---|---|---|---|
| 5 ft 11 5/8 in (1.82 m) | 196 lb (89 kg) | 30 1/2 in (0.77 m) | 8 7/8 in (0.23 m) | 6 ft 2 in (1.88 m) | 4.40 s | 1.60 s | 2.51 s | 4.22 s | 6.99 s | 36.5 in (0.93 m) | 10 ft 1 in (3.07 m) | 12 reps |
All values from Pro Day

=== New England Patriots ===
After not being selected in the 2026 NFL draft, DeGennaro signed with the New England Patriots as an undrafted free agent.

On August 30, 2026, DeGennaro was released by the Patriots as a part of final roster cuts.

=== Washington Commanders ===
On October 7, 2026, the Washington Commanders signed DeGennaro to their practice squad.

== Personal life ==
DeGennaro is the son of Matt DeGennaro, who played quarterback at UConn and in the Arena Football League for the Connecticut Coyotes.
