= 2014 SMU Mustangs football team =

American college football season

2014 SMU Mustangs football
- Conference: American Athletic Conference
- Record: 1–11 (1–7 The American)
- Head coach: June Jones (7th season; first 2 games); Tom Mason (interim; remainder of season)
- Co-offensive coordinators: Dan Morrison (1st season); Jason Phillips (3rd season)
- Offensive scheme: Run and shoot
- Defensive coordinator: Tom Mason (7th season)
- Base defense: 3–4
- Home stadium: Gerald J. Ford Stadium

2014 American Athletic Conference football standings
	Conf.			Overall
Team	W		L	W		L
No. 25 Memphis +	7	–	1	10	–	3
Cincinnati +	7	–	1	9	–	4
UCF +	7	–	1	9	–	4
East Carolina	5	–	3	8	–	5
Houston	5	–	3	8	–	5
Temple	4	–	4	6	–	6
South Florida	3	–	5	4	–	8
Tulane	2	–	6	3	–	9
Tulsa	2	–	6	2	–	10
UConn	1	–	7	2	–	10
SMU	1	–	7	1	–	11
+ – Conference co-champions; Rankings from AP Poll

The 2014 SMU Mustangs football team represented Southern Methodist University in the 2014 NCAA Division I FBS football season. They were led by seventh-year head coach June Jones for two games and interim head coach Tom Mason for the remainder of the season. They played their home games at Gerald J. Ford Stadium in University Park, Texas, an enclave of Dallas and were members of the American Athletic Conference. They finished the season 1–11, 1–7 in AAC play to finish in last place.

After an 0–2 start to the season, head coach June Jones resigned on September 8, citing "personal issues". He finished with a record of 36–43 in just over six seasons. Defensive coordinator Tom Mason led the Mustangs for the remainder of the season. Mason was not retained at the end of the season.

== Preseason ==
=== AAC media poll ===
The American Athletic Conference preseason poll was released on July 29, 2014. The Mustangs were predicted to finish fifth in the conference.

== Schedule ==
Date	Time	Opponent	Site	TV	Result	Attendance
August 31	6:30 p.m.	at No. 10 Baylor*	McLane Stadium; Waco, TX	FS1	L 0–45	45,733
September 6	11:00 a.m.	at North Texas*	Apogee Stadium; Denton, TX (Safeway Bowl)	FSN	L 6–43	22,398
September 20	2:30 p.m.	No. 6 Texas A&M*	Gerald J. Ford Stadium; University Park, TX	ABC/ESPN2	L 6–58	34,820
September 27	11:00 a.m.	TCU*	Gerald J. Ford Stadium; University Park, TX (Battle for the Iron Skillet)	CBSSN	L 0–56	23,093
October 4	11:00 a.m.	at No. 22 East Carolina	Dowdy–Ficklen Stadium; Greenville, NC	ESPNU	L 24–45	45,029
October 18	2:30 p.m.	Cincinnati	Gerald J. Ford Stadium; University Park, TX	CBSSN	L 3–41	16,849
October 25	11:00 a.m.	Memphis	Gerald J. Ford Stadium; University Park, TX	ESPNews	L 10–48	19,498
November 8	11:00 a.m.	at Tulsa	Chapman Stadium; Tulsa, OK	CBSSN	L 28–38	14,269
November 15	7:00 p.m.	South Florida^{†}	Gerald J. Ford Stadium; University Park, TX	CBSSN	L 13–14	19,463
November 22	11:00 a.m.	at UCF	Bright House Networks Stadium; Orlando, FL	ESPNews	L 7–53	30,920
November 28	11:00 a.m.	Houston	Gerald J. Ford Stadium; University Park, TX (rivalry)	CBSSN	L 9–35	15,446
December 6	11:00 a.m.	at UConn	Rentschler Field; East Hartford, CT	CBSSN	W 27–20	22,921
*Non-conference game; ^{†}Homecoming; Rankings from AP Poll released prior to game; All times are in Central time

== Roster ==
2014 SMU Mustangs football team roster
Players
Coaches
Offense

Pos.	#	Name	Class
WR	2	Deion Sanders Jr.	So
RB	3	Kevin Pope	Sr
QB	4	Matt Davis	So
WR	5	Cedric Lancaster	Fr
WR	6	Stephen Nelson	Sr
WR	7	Der'rikk Thompson	Sr
QB	8	Darrell Colbert	Fr
WR	9	Shelby Walker	Fr
QB	11	Jordan Severt	Fr
QB	12	Neal Burcham	So
WR	13	Ryheem Malon	Fr
QB	14	Garrett Krstich	Jr
WR	15	Jordan Ingram	Fr
WR	16	Courtland Sutton	Fr
QB	17	Kolney Cassel	Fr
WR	18	Darius Joseph	Jr
WR	20	Nate Halverson	So
RB	25	K. C. Nlemchi	Jr
WR	27	Aaron Stafford	Jr
RB	33	Daniel Gresham	Fr
WR	38	Justin Musser	Fr
WR	41	Anthony Buffini	So
RB	42	Prescott Line	So
RB	49	Luke Seeker	Sr
OL	51	William Barns	Fr
OL	52	Taylor Lasecki	Jr
OL	57	Chad Pursley	Fr
OL	58	Taylor Reich	Jr
OL	60	Keyfer Roberts	Fr
OL	62	Travis Fister	Fr
OL	63	Evan Brown	Fr
OL	67	Daniel McCarty	So
OL	68	Nick Natour	Fr
OL	70	Tony Richards	Fr
OL	71	Chauncey Briggs	So
OL	72	Braylon Hyder	Fr
OL	74	Christian Chamagua	So
OL	75	Kris Weeks	Jr
OL	76	Christian Holloway	So
OL	77	Jarrett Spencer	Jr
OL	78	Bozidar Antunovic	Jr
OL	79	Seaver Myers	So
WR	83	Chris Hipps	Sr
WR	84	Jeremiah Gaines	So
WR	88	Daijuan Stewart	So

Defense

Pos.	#	Name	Class
LB	1	Jonathan Yenga	Jr
LB	2	Caleb Tuiasosopo	Jr
DB	4	Jesse Montgomery	Fr
LB	5	Nick Horton	So
DL	7	Elie Nabushosi	So
LB	8	Jordan Miller	Sr
DB	9	Horace Richardson	So
DB	10	Ajee Montes	So
LB	11	Inoke Ngalo	Fr
DB	13	Cayman Carter	Fr
DB	14	Trey Washington	Fr
DB	15	Jordan Wyatt	Fr
LB	16	Ben Sellers	Jr
DB	18	William Jeanlys	Fr
DB	20	A. J. Justice	So
DB	22	Hayden Greenbauer	Sr
LB	23	Stephon Sanders	Sr
DB	24	J. R. Richardson	Jr
LB	25	Derek Longoria	Jr
DB	26	Troy Castle	Jr
DB	27	Myles Crosby	Fr
DB	28	Shakiel Randolph	Jr
DB	29	Darrion Millines	So
LB	30	Robert Seals	Jr
DL	33	Jarvis Pruitt	So
LB	34	R. C. Cox	Fr
LB	39	Jeremy White	So
LB	40	Carlos Carroll	Fr
DB	42	Adam Waheed	Sr
DE	43	Parker Collins	Fr
LB	44	Jackson Mitchell	So
LB	45	Dylan Dickman	Fr
LB	47	John Bordano	Sr
LB	48	Anthony Rhone	Fr
LB	52	Cameron Nwosu	Sr
DT	54	Darrian Wright	Sr
DL	55	Spencer Conley	Jr
LB	59	Kyran Mitchell	Fr
DB	61	Raul Reyes III	Fr
DT	66	Gareth Riley-Ayers	Jr
DB	82	Collin LaGasse	So
DE	90	Zach Wood	Jr
DE	91	Spencer Hollie	Fr
DE	92	Zelt Minor	So
DE	93	Mason Gentry	Fr
LB	94	Beau Barnes	Sr
DL	95	Andrew McCleneghen	Jr
DL	96	Cameron Smith	Jr
DL	97	Nick Reed	So
DL	98	Jerry Saena	Fr
DL	99	Justin Lawler	Fr

Special teams

Pos.	#	Name	Class
P, K	35	Jackson Koonce	Fr
K	36	Cody Rademacher	Sr
K	38	Michael Armstrong	Fr
K	50	Daniel Chaparro	So
LS	56	Nicholas Avantino	Fr

Head coach

- June Jones (Portland State)
- Tom Mason (Eastern Washington)
  Interim Head Coach/Associate head coach/defensive coordinator

Coordinators/assistant coaches

- Dan Morrison (UCLA)
  Associate head coach/quarterbacks
- Steve Broussard (Washington State)
  Running backs
- Eric Daniels (Hardin–Simmons)
  Linebackers
- Bert Hill (Auburn Montgomery)
  Defensive line
- Derrick Odum (Utah)
  Secondary
- Jason Phillips (Houston)
  co-Offensive coordinator/wide receivers
- Wes Suan (Linfield)
  Offensive line
- Carlos Barocio–León (New Mexico State)
  Special teams

Support staff

- Keith Gunn (Abilene Christian)
  Offensive quality control coordinator & recruiting analyst
- Derrius Bell (SMU)
  Defensive quality control coordinator
- A. J. Smith (Louisiana)
  Graduate assistant (offense)
- Ryan Walker (SMU)
  Graduate assistant (offense)
- Nate Fisher (Texas Tech)
  Graduate assistant (defense)
- Jeremy Gray (SMU)
  Graduate assistant (defense)
- Randy Ross (Southern Benedictine)
  Director of football operations
- Steve Stigall (Texas)
  Assistant director of football operations
- Tam Hollingshead (SMU)
  Director of high school relations
- Mel deLaura (Hawaii Pacific)
  Head strength & conditioning coach
- Terry Gardner (SMU)
  Administrative assistant
- Shay Taylor (SMU)
  Administrative assistant
- Mike Morton (Purdue)
  Director of sports medicine
- Albert Veytia (UTEP)
  Equipment manager
- Lopaka Ornellas (Hawaiʻi)
  Video coordinator

Legend

- (C) Team captain
- (S) Suspended
- (I) Ineligible
- Injured
- Redshirt

Roster
Last update: April 14, 2018

== Game summaries ==
=== At No. 10 Baylor ===
	1	2	3	4	Total
Mustangs	0	0	0	0	0
No. 10 Bears	24	7	7	7	45

Statistics	SMU	BAY
First downs	7	31
Total yards	67	574
Rushing yards	-24	261
Passing yards	91	313
Turnovers	3	2
Time of possession	39:18	30:06

Team	Category	Player	Statistics
SMU	Passing	Neal Burcham	15/26, 59 yards
SMU	Rushing	Prescott Line	4 rushes, 18 yards
SMU	Receiving	Der'rikk Thompson	2 receptions, 21 yards
Baylor	Passing	Bryce Petty	13/23, 161 yards, 2 TD
Baylor	Rushing	Shock Linwood	16 rushes, 89 yards, TD
Baylor	Receiving	Davion Hall	7 receptions, 86 yards

=== At North Texas ===
	1	2	3	4	Total
Mustangs	0	0	0	6	6
Mean Green	3	20	6	14	43

Statistics	SMU	UNT
First downs	16	17
Total yards	276	353
Rushing yards	10	245
Passing yards	266	108
Turnovers	5	0
Time of possession	26:45	36:38

Team	Category	Player	Statistics
SMU	Passing	Kolney Cassel	11/21, 134 yards, TD
SMU	Rushing	Kevin Pope	8 rushes, 33 yards
SMU	Receiving	Der'rikk Thompson	6 receptions, 74 yards
North Texas	Passing	Josh Greer	9/12, 86 yards
North Texas	Rushing	Reggie Pegram	21 rushes, 81 yards, TD
North Texas	Receiving	Carlos Harris	4 receptions, 36 yards

=== No. 6 Texas A&M ===
	1	2	3	4	Total
No. 6 Aggies	17	21	10	10	58
Mustangs	0	3	0	3	6

Statistics	TAMU	SMU
First downs	27	13
Total yards	663	241
Rushing yards	268	102
Passing yards	395	139
Turnovers	1	0
Time of possession	23:46	35:15

Team	Category	Player	Statistics
Texas A&M	Passing	Kenny Hill	16/22, 265 yards, 2 TD, INT
Texas A&M	Rushing	Trey Williams	7 rushes, 66 yards, 2 TD
Texas A&M	Receiving	Jeremy Tabuyo	2 receptions, 80 yards, 2 TD
SMU	Passing	Garrett Krstich	13/24, 137 yards
SMU	Rushing	Kevin Pope	11 rushes, 44 yards
SMU	Receiving	Der'rikk Thompson	3 receptions, 72 yards

=== TCU ===
	1	2	3	4	Total
Horned Frogs	7	21	21	7	56
Mustangs	0	0	0	0	0

Statistics	TCU	SMU
First downs	31	17
Total yards	614	245
Rushing yards	265	89
Passing yards	349	156
Turnovers	0	3
Time of possession	28:25	31:35

Team	Category	Player	Statistics
TCU	Passing	Trevone Boykin	23/36, 280 yards, 4 TD
TCU	Rushing	B. J. Catalon	19 rushes, 114 yards, TD
TCU	Receiving	Deanté Gray	6 receptions, 96 yards, 2 TD
SMU	Passing	Garrett Krstich	14/30, 142 yards, INT
SMU	Rushing	Luke Seeker	9 rushes, 34 yards
SMU	Receiving	Darius Joseph	5 receptions, 46 yards

=== At No. 22 East Carolina ===
	1	2	3	4	Total
Mustangs	0	7	17	0	24
No. 22 Pirates	14	14	7	10	45

Statistics	SMU	ECU
First downs	25	30
Total yards	390	581
Rushing yards	51	171
Passing yards	339	410
Turnovers	1	1
Time of possession	31:22	28:38

Team	Category	Player	Statistics
SMU	Passing	Garrett Krstich	42/67, 339 yards, 2 TD, INT
SMU	Rushing	K. C. Nlemchi	6 rushes, 22 yards
SMU	Receiving	Darius Joseph	13 receptions, 100 yards, 2 TD
East Carolina	Passing	Shane Carden	31/41, 410 yards, 4 TD
East Carolina	Rushing	Chris Hairston	12 rushes, 53 yards, TD
East Carolina	Receiving	Zay Jones	9 receptions, 130 yards, TD

=== Cincinnati ===
	1	2	3	4	Total
Bearcats	6	22	3	10	41
Mustangs	3	0	0	0	3

Statistics	CIN	SMU
First downs	29	14
Total yards	508	276
Rushing yards	240	98
Passing yards	268	178
Turnovers	0	4
Time of possession	32:01	27:59

Team	Category	Player	Statistics
Cincinnati	Passing	Gunner Kiel	13/20, 241 yards, TD
Cincinnati	Rushing	Jarred Evans	10 rushes, 67 yards, TD
Cincinnati	Receiving	Casey Gladney	2 reception, 61 yards
SMU	Passing	Garrett Krstich	17/31, 172 yards, 2 INT
SMU	Rushing	Matt Davis	4 rushes, 41 yards
SMU	Receiving	Nate Halverson	4 receptions, 42 yards

=== Memphis ===
	1	2	3	4	Total
Tigers	7	24	10	7	48
Mustangs	0	7	3	0	10

Statistics	MEM	SMU
First downs	29	15
Total yards	582	251
Rushing yards	230	137
Passing yards	352	114
Turnovers	1	2
Time of possession	32:10	27:50

Team	Category	Player	Statistics
Memphis	Passing	Paxton Lynch	17/23, 307 yards, TD
Memphis	Rushing	Brandon Hayes	14 rushes, 99 yards, TD
Memphis	Receiving	Phil Mayhue	2 receptions, 96 yards, TD
SMU	Passing	Garrett Krstich	10/22, 59 yards, 2 INT
SMU	Rushing	Matt Davis	7 rushes, 46 yards
SMU	Receiving	Der'rikk Thompson	2 receptions, 65 yards

=== At Tulsa ===
	1	2	3	4	Total
Mustangs	13	0	0	15	28
Golden Hurricane	14	14	7	3	38

Statistics	SMU	TLSA
First downs	21	26
Total yards	464	501
Rushing yards	252	215
Passing yards	212	286
Turnovers	3	1
Time of possession	29:40	30:20

Team	Category	Player	Statistics
SMU	Passing	Matt Davis	21/32, 212 yards, TD, 2 INT
SMU	Rushing	Matt Davis	28 rushes, 181 yards, 2 TD
SMU	Receiving	Der'rikk Thompson	4 receptions, 84 yards, TD
Tulsa	Passing	Dane Evans	16/24, 286 yards, 5 TD
Tulsa	Rushing	Zack Langer	33 rushes, 167 yards
Tulsa	Receiving	Keyarris Garrett	4 receptions, 96 yards, 2 TD

=== South Florida ===
	1	2	3	4	Total
Bulls	0	0	0	14	14
Mustangs	0	13	0	0	13

Statistics	USF	SMU
First downs	18	13
Total yards	378	257
Rushing yards	167	68
Passing yards	211	189
Turnovers	2	0
Time of possession	32:19	27:21

Team	Category	Player	Statistics
South Florida	Passing	Mike White	9/16, 106 yards, 2 TD
South Florida	Rushing	Marlon Mack	17 rushes, 79 yards
South Florida	Receiving	Andre Davis	6 receptions, 59 yards, TD
SMU	Passing	Matt Davis	22/31, 189 yards, TD
SMU	Rushing	Matt Davis	11 rushes, 53 yards
SMU	Receiving	Der'rikk Thompson	3 receptions, 96 yards

=== At UCF ===
	1	2	3	4	Total
Mustangs	0	7	0	0	7
Knights	27	10	6	10	53

Statistics	SMU	UCF
First downs	4	27
Total yards	116	490
Rushing yards	66	236
Passing yards	50	254
Turnovers	5	2
Time of possession	26:24	40:16

Team	Category	Player	Statistics
SMU	Passing	Matt Davis	6/15, 44 yards, INT
SMU	Rushing	Matt Davis	7 rushes, 40 yards, TD
SMU	Receiving	Deion Sanders Jr.	4 receptions, 38 yards
UCF	Passing	Justin Holman	15/22, 228 yards, 2 TD, 2 INT
UCF	Rushing	Micah Reed	26 rushes, 112 yards
UCF	Receiving	J. J. Worton	2 receptions, 64 yards, TD

=== Houston ===
	1	2	3	4	Total
Cougars	7	0	21	7	35
Mustangs	0	9	0	0	9

Statistics	HOU	SMU
First downs	25	10
Total yards	433	223
Rushing yards	282	78
Passing yards	151	145
Turnovers	1	1
Time of possession	30:56	28:31

Team	Category	Player	Statistics
Houston	Passing	Greg Ward	17/28, 144 yards, INT
Houston	Rushing	Kenneth Farrow	18 rushes, 110 yards, 2 TD
Houston	Receiving	Markeith Ambles	3 receptions, 41 yards
SMU	Passing	Matt Davis	13/27, 145 yards, TD
SMU	Rushing	Matt Davis	20 rushes, 70 yards
SMU	Receiving	Jeremiah Gaines	2 receptions, 76 yards, TD

=== At UConn ===
	1	2	3	4	Total
Mustangs	6	0	14	7	27
Huskies	6	14	0	0	20

Statistics	SMU	CONN
First downs	20	11
Total yards	422	316
Rushing yards	277	249
Passing yards	145	67
Turnovers	3	5
Time of possession	32:05	27:55

Team	Category	Player	Statistics
SMU	Passing	Matt Davis	15/33, 145 yards, INT
SMU	Rushing	Matt Davis	22 rushes, 191 yards, TD
SMU	Receiving	Darius Joseph	9 receptions, 108 yards
UConn	Passing	Chandler Whitmer	1/3, 38 yards, INT
UConn	Rushing	Ron Johnson	23 rushes, 101 yards, TD
UConn	Receiving	Josh Marriner	1 reception, 38 yards
