= Terry Caulley =

American football player (born 1984)

Profile
- Position: Running back

Personal information
- Born: June 22, 1984 (age 42); Honolulu, Hawaii, U.S.
- Listed height: 5 ft 7 in (1.70 m)
- Listed weight: 185 lb (84 kg)

Career information
- High school: Patuxent (MD)
- College: Connecticut
- NFL draft: 2007: undrafted

Career history
- Washington Redskins (2007)*; Hamilton Tiger-Cats (2007–2009)
- * Offseason or practice squad member only
- Stats at CFL.ca (archive)

Terry J. Caulley (born June 22, 1984) is an American former gridiron football running back. He played college football at University of Connecticut. Despite sitting out the second half of 2003 and the entire 2004 season with a knee injury, he racked up 3,187 rushing yards including 31 touchdowns. In 2003, Caulley had a breakout game against the Buffalo, rushing for 236 yards. Despite having a successful college career, he was not selected in the 2007 NFL draft. However, he signed with the Washington Redskins as an undrafted rookie free agent on April 30, 2007, but was released by the Redskins on June 1, 2007. Caulley played for the Hamilton Tiger-Cats of the Canadian Football League (CFL) from 2007 to 2009. On November 6, 2009, the Tiger-Cats released Caulley.

== College statistics ==
Year	Games	Rushing				Receiving			
Year	Games	Att	Yds	Avg	TD	Att	Yds	Avg	TD
2002	10	220	1247	5.7	15	25	205	8.2	1
2003	5	89	607	6.8	7	14	81	5.8	1
2004	Medical redshirt								
2005	11	141	659	4.7	6	27	176	6.5	0
2006	10	120	674	5.6	3	19	117	6.2	1
Career	36	570	3187	5.6	31	85	579	6.8	3
