= Linden Stephens =

American football player (born 1995)

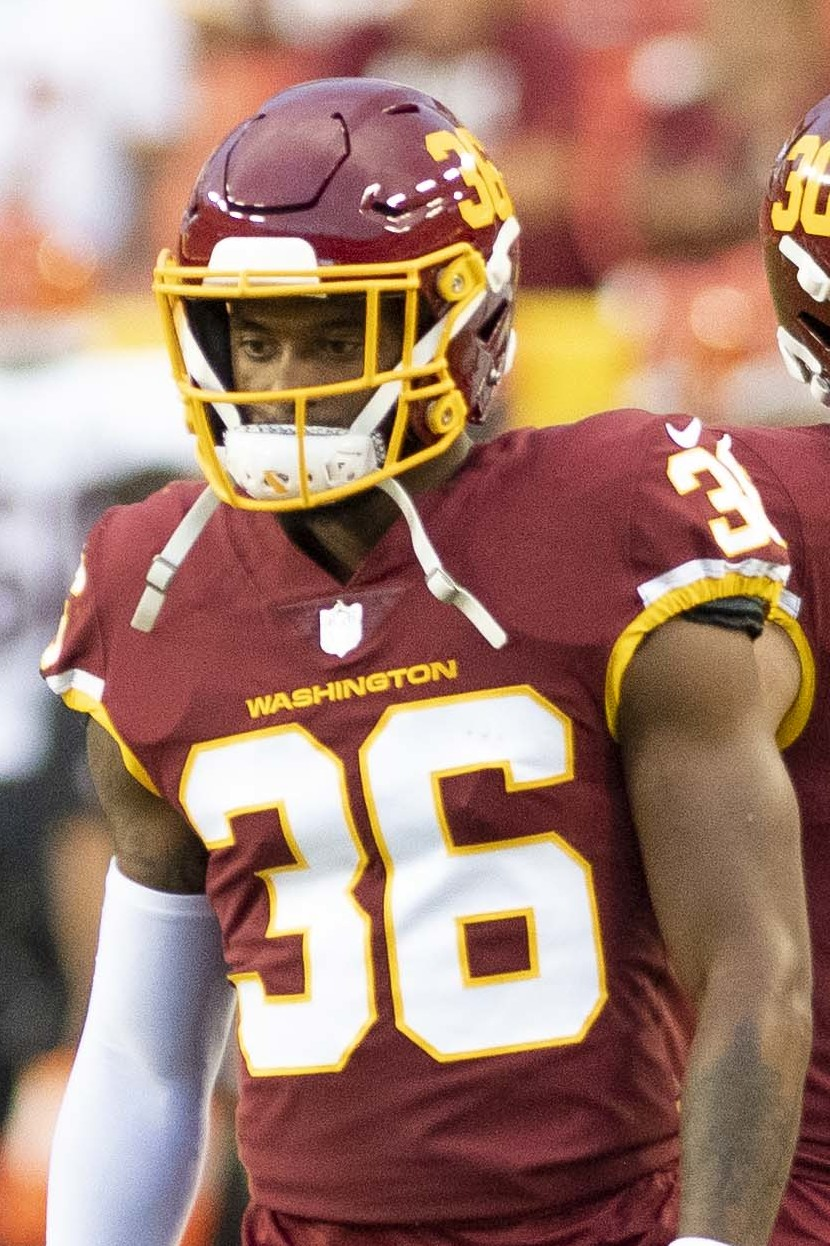
- Stephens with the Washington Football Team in 2021

No. 32, 34, 30
- Position: Cornerback

Personal information
- Born: March 21, 1995 (age 31); Euclid, Ohio, U.S.
- Listed height: 6 ft 0 in (1.83 m)
- Listed weight: 193 lb (88 kg)

Career information
- High school: Euclid
- College: Cincinnati
- NFL draft: 2018: undrafted

Career history
- New Orleans Saints (2018)*; Los Angeles Rams (2018)*; Denver Broncos (2018–2019)*; Seattle Seahawks (2019)*; Miami Dolphins (2019); Seattle Seahawks (2020); Washington Football Team (2021)*; Baltimore Ravens (2021)*; Pittsburgh Steelers (2021–2022)*; Seattle Sea Dragons (2023); Montreal Alouettes (2024)*
- * Offseason or practice squad member only

Career NFL statistics
- Total tackles: 6
- Stats at Pro Football Reference

Linden Stephens (born March 21, 1995) is an American former professional football player who was a cornerback in the National Football League (NFL). He played college football for the Cincinnati Bearcats and signed with the New Orleans Saints as an undrafted free agent in 2018. He was also a member of several other NFL teams.

== Professional career ==
=== New Orleans Saints ===
Stephens signed with the New Orleans Saints as an undrafted free agent on May 4, 2018. He was waived by the Saints on August 31, 2018 during final roster cuts.

=== Los Angeles Rams ===
Stephens was signed to the Los Angeles Rams' practice squad on October 3, 2018. He was released on October 16.

=== Denver Broncos ===
Stephens was signed to the Denver Broncos practice squad on November 21, 2018 and stayed with the team for the remainder of his rookie season. He was cut by the Broncos at the end of training camp going into the 2019 season.

=== Seattle Seahawks (first stint) ===
Stephens was signed to the Seattle Seahawks practice squad on September 25, 2019.

=== Miami Dolphins ===
The Miami Dolphins signed Stephens off the Seahawks practice squad on December 7, 2019.

On April 18, 2020, Stephens was waived by the Dolphins.

=== Seattle Seahawks (second stint) ===
Stephens was claimed off waivers by the Seahawks on April 21, 2020. He was waived on September 6, 2020, and signed to the practice squad the next day. Following the season ending injuries of multiple players after the team's week 2 victory over the New England Patriots, Stephens was promoted onto the main roster on September 23, 2020.

=== Washington Football Team ===
Stephens signed with the Washington Football Team on May 5, 2021. He was waived on August 31, 2021.

=== Baltimore Ravens ===
On September 21, 2021, Stephens signed with the Baltimore Ravens practice squad. He was released on October 4, 2021.

=== Pittsburgh Steelers ===
On October 13, 2021, Stephens was signed to the Pittsburgh Steelers practice squad. He signed a reserve/future contract with the Steelers on January 18, 2022.

On August 30, 2022, Stephens was waived by the Steelers.

=== Seattle Sea Dragons ===
On November 17, 2022, Stephens was selected by the Seattle Sea Dragons of the XFL. He was released on August 17, 2023.

=== Montreal Alouettes ===
On February 25, 2024, Stephens signed with the Montreal Alouettes of the Canadian Football League (CFL). He was placed on the reserve/suspended list on May 15, 2024.

== Personal life ==
His father, Mac Stephens, played American football in college at Minnesota then in the NFL as a linebacker.

His grandfather, Gus “Honeycomb” Johnson, played basketball in the NBA and was inducted into the Naismith Memorial Basketball Hall of Fame in 2010.
