= 2014 South Florida Bulls football team =

American college football season

2014 South Florida Bulls football
- Conference: American Athletic Conference
- Record: 4–8 (3–5 AAC)
- Head coach: Willie Taggart (2nd season)
- Offensive coordinator: Paul Wulff (1st season)
- Offensive scheme: Gulf Coast
- Defensive coordinator: Chuck Bresnahan (2nd season)
- Base defense: 4–3
- Home stadium: Raymond James Stadium

2014 American Athletic Conference football standings
	Conf.			Overall
Team	W		L	W		L
No. 25 Memphis +	7	–	1	10	–	3
Cincinnati +	7	–	1	9	–	4
UCF +	7	–	1	9	–	4
East Carolina	5	–	3	8	–	5
Houston	5	–	3	8	–	5
Temple	4	–	4	6	–	6
South Florida	3	–	5	4	–	8
Tulane	2	–	6	3	–	9
Tulsa	2	–	6	2	–	10
UConn	1	–	7	2	–	10
SMU	1	–	7	1	–	11
+ – Conference co-champions; Rankings from AP Poll

The 2014 South Florida Bulls football team represented the University of South Florida (USF) in the 2014 NCAA Division I FBS football season. The USF Bulls played their home games at Raymond James Stadium in Tampa, FL. The 2014 college football season was the 18th season overall for the Bulls, and their second season as a member of the American Athletic Conference. They were led by second year head coach Willie Taggart. They finished the season 4–8, 3–5 in AAC play to finish in seventh place.

== Schedule ==
Date	Time	Opponent	Site	TV	Result	Attendance
August 30	7:00 p.m.	Western Carolina*	Raymond James Stadium; Tampa, FL	ESPN3	W 36–31	31,642
September 6	3:30 p.m.	Maryland*	Raymond James Stadium; Tampa, FL	CBSSN	L 17–24	28,915
September 13	3:30 p.m.	NC State*	Raymond James Stadium; Tampa, FL	CBSSN	L 17–49	27,269
September 19	8:00 p.m.	UConn	Raymond James Stadium; Tampa, FL	ESPN	W 17–14	28,273
September 27	12:00 p.m.	at No. 19 Wisconsin*	Camp Randall Stadium; Madison, WI	ESPNU	L 10–27	78,111
October 11	7:00 p.m.	No. 19 East Carolina^{†}	Raymond James Stadium; Tampa, FL	ESPNU	L 17–28	31,567
October 18	12:00 p.m.	at Tulsa	Chapman Stadium; Tulsa, OK	ESPNews	W 38–30	18,744
October 24	7:00 p.m.	at Cincinnati	Paul Brown Stadium; Cincinnati, OH	ESPN2	L 17–34	30,024
November 1	4:00 p.m.	Houston	Raymond James Stadium; Tampa, FL	ESPNews	L 3–27	29,782
November 15	8:00 p.m.	at SMU	Gerald J. Ford Stadium; University Park, TX	CBSSN	W 14–13	19,463
November 22	4:00 p.m.	at Memphis	Liberty Bowl Memorial Stadium; Memphis, TN	ESPNews	L 20–31	34,635
November 28	12:00 p.m.	UCF	Raymond James Stadium; Tampa, FL (War on I–4)	ESPN2	L 0–16	36,963
*Non-conference game; ^{†}Homecoming; Rankings from Coaches' Poll released prior to the game; All times are in Eastern time

== Roster ==
2014 South Florida Bulls football team roster
Players
Coaches
Offense

Pos.	#	Name	Class
WR	7	Andre Davis	Sr
OL	70	Quinterrius Eatmon	Sr
WR	87	Rodney Adams	So

Defense

Pos.	#	Name	Class
CB	20	Devin Abraham	Fr
LB	57	Nigel Harris	So

Special teams

Pos.	#	Name	Class

Head coach

- Willie Taggart

Coordinators/assistant coaches

Legend

- (C) Team captain
- (S) Suspended
- (I) Ineligible
- Injured
- Redshirt

== Game summaries ==
=== Western Carolina ===
	1	2	3	4	Total
Catamounts	14	3	0	14	31
Bulls	3	13	7	13	36

=== Maryland ===
	1	2	3	4	Total
Terrapins	14	0	0	10	24
Bulls	7	10	0	0	17

=== NC State ===
	1	2	3	4	Total
Wolfpack	14	21	14	0	49
Bulls	7	0	10	0	17

=== UConn ===
	1	2	3	4	Total
Huskies	0	7	0	7	14
Bulls	14	0	0	3	17

=== Wisconsin ===
	1	2	3	4	Total
Bulls	3	0	7	0	10
#19 Badgers	3	0	17	7	27

=== East Carolina ===
	1	2	3	4	Total
#19 Pirates	7	0	7	14	28
Bulls	7	10	0	0	17

Last meeting was the 2006 PapaJohns.com Bowl

=== Tulsa ===
	1	2	3	4	Total
Bulls	7	0	14	17	38
Golden Hurricane	17	10	3	0	30

=== Cincinnati ===
	1	2	3	4	Total
Bulls	3	0	0	14	17
Bearcats	10	10	0	14	34

=== Houston ===
	1	2	3	4	Total
Cougars	7	0	7	13	27
Bulls	0	0	3	0	3

=== SMU ===
	1	2	3	4	Total
Bulls	0	0	0	14	14
Mustangs	0	13	0	0	13

=== Memphis ===
	1	2	3	4	Total
Bulls	3	10	0	7	20
Tigers	14	7	7	3	31

=== UCF ===
	1	2	3	4	Total
Knights	0	14	2	0	16
Bulls	0	0	0	0	0
