= Mark Didio =

American football player (born 1969)

No. 88
- Position: Wide receiver

Personal information
- Born: February 17, 1969 (age 57); Syracuse, New York, U.S.
- Listed height: 5 ft 11 in (1.80 m)
- Listed weight: 181 lb (82 kg)

Career information
- High school: Henninger (Syracuse)
- College: Connecticut (1988–1991)
- NFL draft: 1992: undrafted

Career history
- Pittsburgh Steelers (1992); Green Bay Packers (1994)*
- * Offseason or practice squad member only

Career NFL statistics
- Receptions: 3
- Receiving yards: 39
- Stats at Pro Football Reference

Mark Vincent Didio (born February 17, 1969) is an American former professional football player who was a wide receiver for one season with the Pittsburgh Steelers of the National Football League (NFL). He played college football for the Connecticut Huskies.

== Early life and college ==
Mark Vincent Didio was born on February 17, 1969, in Syracuse, New York. He attended Henninger High School in Syracuse.

Didio was a four-year letterman for the Huskies of the University of Connecticut from 1988 to 1991. He set school career records in receptions and receiving yards with 239 catches for 3,535 yards. His 3,535 receiving yards were also the fourth-most in NCAA Division I-AA history at the time.

== Professional career ==
After going undrafted in the 1992 NFL draft, Didio signed with the Pittsburgh Steelers on May 1. He was released on August 31 and signed to the practice squad the next day. He was promoted to the active roster on November 14 and played in two games for the Steelers during the 1992 season, catching three passes for 39 yards on four targets. Didio was released on November 28 and signed back to the practice squad on December 2. He became a free agent after the season and re-signed with the team on March 3, 1993. He was later released on August 23, 1993.

Didio was signed by the Green Bay Packers on March 11, 1994. He was released on May 3, 1994.

== Personal life ==
Didio worked in medical device sales after his NFL career. His son, Mark Didio Jr., also played college football for the Connecticut Huskies.
