= Kevin Mensah (American football) =

American football player (born 1998)

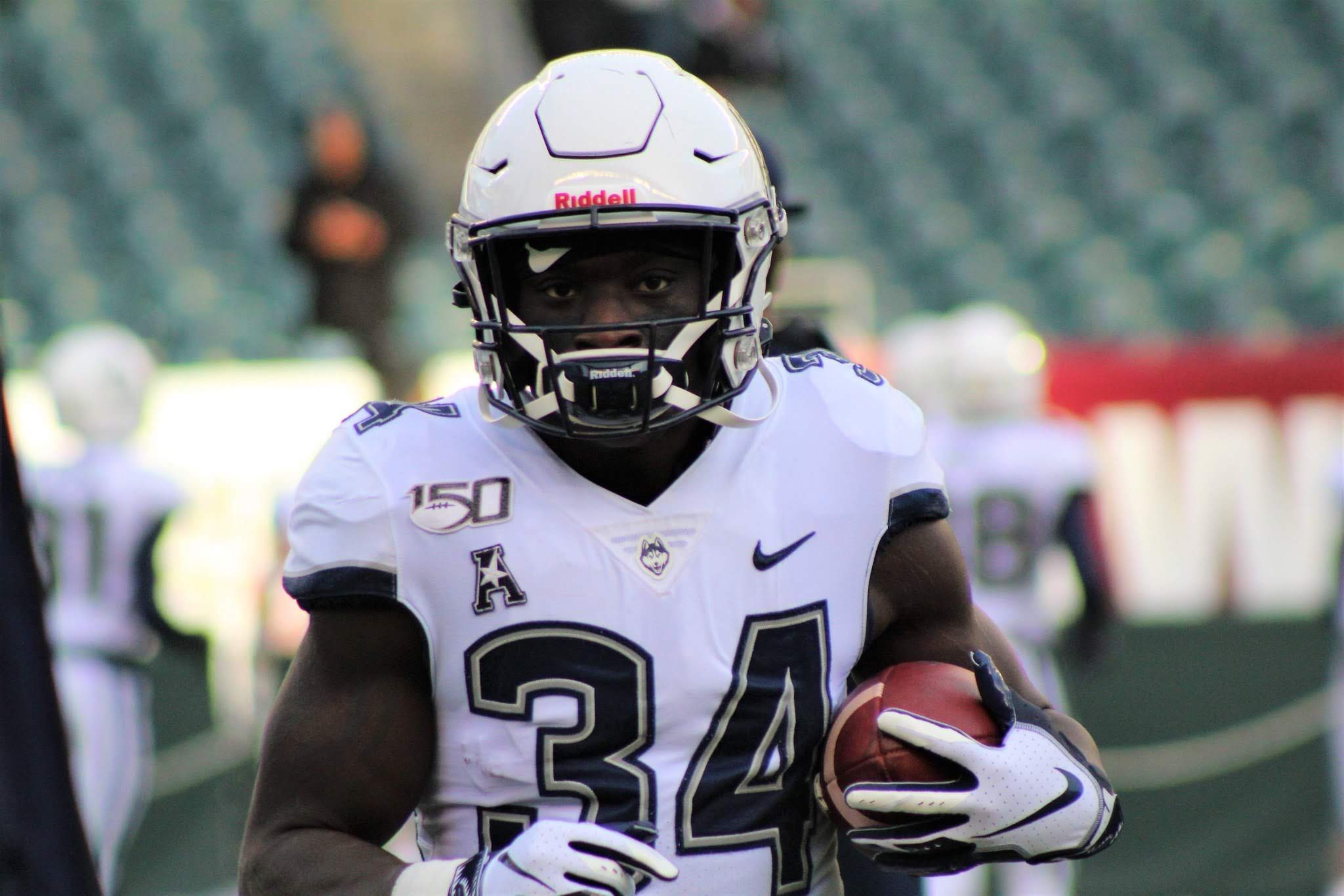
- Kevin Mensah Warm Up (2019)

No. 34
- Position: Running back

Personal information
- Born: August 1, 1998 (age 28)
- Listed height: 5 ft 9 in (1.75 m)
- Listed weight: 205 lb (93 kg)

Career information
- High school: Shepherd Hill Regional (Dudley, Massachusetts)
- College: UConn (2017–2021)
- Stats at ESPN

Kevin Mensah is an American football running back best known for his collegiate career at the University of Connecticut. A two-time 1,000-yard rusher, he ranks fourth all-time in rushing yards at UConn.

== Early life ==
Mensah attended Holy Name Central Catholic High School, where he played football. He wore the number 3 jersey and became one of the state's top recruits.

In 2016, Mensah transferred to Shepherd Hill Regional High School in Dudley, Massachusetts. He rushed for over 3,700 yards and accumulated more than 5,000 all-purpose yards. Mensah also competed in track and field, winning Mid-Wach A League and District E titles, and was nationally ranked in the 60-meter dash.

Mensah's transfer to Shepherd Hill in 2016 drew attention due to Massachusetts Interscholastic Athletic Association eligibility rules, which require student-athletes who transfer schools without a change of residence to sit out for one year unless granted a waiver. Mensah and his family applied for a waiver, citing family reasons for the transfer, but the case drew scrutiny in state media as part of a broader debate about recruiting and transfers in Massachusetts high school sports. The final eligibility ruling allowed Mensah to play at Shepherd Hill, but the case highlighted the lack of transparency and consistency in MIAA's waiver decisions.

== College career ==
In 2018, Mensah rushed for 1,045 yards, becoming the first UConn player since 2011 to eclipse 1,000 rushing yards. He repeated this in 2019 with 1,013 rushing yards and a career-high 9 touchdowns.

Following his 2019 season, Mensah was named to the ECAC All-Offensive Team, recognizing his achievements—particularly his two-season 1,000-yard rushing streak and a five-touchdown performance against UMass. Mensah was also named to the Doak Walker Award watchlist in 2019 and 2020 and earned a spot on the Athlon Sports Preseason All‑Independent Team.

Among his career highlights was a game against UMass in 2019, when he rushed for 164 yards and five touchdowns—one of the highest single-game TD totals in the country recorded that year.

In 2021, Mensah concluded his college career with 2,933 rushing yards, placing him fourth on UConn's all-time rushing leaderboard.

== Career ==
In 2021, following the NCAA's approval of NIL (Name, Image, and Likeness) rules, Mensah announced brand partnerships with iSlide – a Boston-based custom slide sandal company and Barstool Sports in their "Barstool Athlete" program for college athlete NIL endorsements.

== Career statistics ==
Year	Team	Games	Rushing Yards	Rushing TDs
2017	UConn	11	561	4
2018	UConn	12	1,045	6
2019	UConn	12	1,013	9
2021	UConn	10	314	2
