= Glenn Antrum =

American football player (born 1966)

No. 10
- Position: Wide receiver

Personal information
- Born: February 3, 1966 (age 60); Derby, Connecticut, U.S.
- Listed height: 5 ft 11 in (1.80 m)
- Listed weight: 175 lb (79 kg)

Career information
- High school: Ansonia (Ansonia, Connecticut)
- College: UConn
- NFL draft: 1989: undrafted

Career history
- New England Patriots (1989); New York Jets (1990)*; New England Patriots (1990)
- * Offseason or practice squad member only
- Stats at Pro Football Reference

Glenn Antrum (born February 3, 1966) is an American former professional football player who was a wide receiver for one season with the New England Patriots of the National Football League (NFL). He played college football for the UConn Huskies and went undrafted in 1989.
