= 2014 Tulsa Golden Hurricane football team =

American college football season

2014 Tulsa Golden Hurricane football
- Conference: American Athletic Conference
- Record: 2–10 (2–6 AAC)
- Head coach: Bill Blankenship (4th season)
- Offensive coordinator: Denver Johnson (1st season)
- Defensive coordinator: Brent Guy (4th season)
- Home stadium: Skelly Field at H. A. Chapman Stadium

2014 American Athletic Conference football standings
	Conf.			Overall
Team	W		L	W		L
No. 25 Memphis +	7	–	1	10	–	3
Cincinnati +	7	–	1	9	–	4
UCF +	7	–	1	9	–	4
East Carolina	5	–	3	8	–	5
Houston	5	–	3	8	–	5
Temple	4	–	4	6	–	6
South Florida	3	–	5	4	–	8
Tulane	2	–	6	3	–	9
Tulsa	2	–	6	2	–	10
UConn	1	–	7	2	–	10
SMU	1	–	7	1	–	11
+ – Conference co-champions; Rankings from AP Poll

The 2014 Tulsa Golden Hurricane football team represented the University of Tulsa in the 2014 NCAA Division I FBS football season. They were led by fourth-year head coach Bill Blankenship and played their home games at Skelly Field at H. A. Chapman Stadium. They were first year members of the American Athletic Conference. They finished the season 2–10 overall and 2–6 in conference play to finish in a tie for eighth place.

Blankenship was fired at the end of the season. He finished with a four-year record of 24–27.

== Schedule ==
Date	Time	Opponent	Site	TV	Result	Attendance
August 28	7:00 p.m.	Tulane	Skelly Field at H. A. Chapman Stadium; Tulsa, OK	CBSSN	W 38–31 ^{2OT}	19,032
September 6	11:00 a.m.	No. 4 Oklahoma*	Chapman Stadium; Tulsa, OK	ABC/ESPN2	L 7–52	29,357
September 13	6:00 p.m.	at Florida Atlantic*	FAU Stadium; Boca Raton, FL	FCS	L 21–50	14,112
September 27	7:00 p.m.	Texas State*	Skelly Field at H. A. Chapman Stadium; Tulsa, OK	ESPNews	L 34–37 ^{3OT}	21,353
October 4	2:00 p.m.	at Colorado State*	Hughes Stadium; Fort Collins, CO	MWN	L 17–42	25,806
October 11	11:00 a.m.	at Temple	Lincoln Financial Field; Philadelphia, PA	ESPNews	L 24–35	25,340
October 18	11:00 a.m.	South Florida^{†}	Skelly Field at H. A. Chapman Stadium; Tulsa, OK	ESPNews	L 30–38	18,744
October 31	7:00 p.m.	at Memphis	Liberty Bowl Memorial Stadium; Memphis, TN	ESPNU	L 20–40	26,846
November 8	11:00 a.m.	SMU	Skelly Field at H. A. Chapman Stadium; Tulsa, OK	CBSSN	W 38–28	14,269
November 14	7:00 p.m.	at Central Florida	Bright House Networks Stadium; Orlando, FL	ESPN2	L 7–31	35,323
November 22	2:00 p.m.	at Houston	TDECU Stadium; Houston, TX	ESPN3	L 28–38	23,572
November 28	7:30 p.m.	East Carolina	Skelly Field at H. A. Chapman Stadium; Tulsa, OK	ESPNU	L 32–49	15,126
*Non-conference game; ^{†}Homecoming; Rankings from AP Poll released prior to the game; All times are in Central time

== Game summaries ==
=== Tulane ===
	1	2	3	4	OT	2OT	Total
Green Wave	7	14	0	7	3	0	31
Golden Hurricane	0	14	3	11	3	7	38

=== Oklahoma ===
	1	2	3	4	Total
No. 4 Sooners	21	10	14	7	52
Golden Hurricane	0	0	7	0	7

=== At Florida Atlantic ===
	1	2	3	4	Total
Golden Hurricane	0	7	7	7	21
Owls	17	16	10	7	50

=== Texas State ===
	1	2	3	4	OT	2OT	3OT	Total
Bobcats	0	7	10	0	7	7	6	37
Golden Hurricane	0	0	3	14	7	7	3	34

=== At Colorado State ===
	1	2	3	4	Total
Golden Hurricane	0	7	3	7	17
Rams	14	14	7	7	42

=== At Temple ===
	1	2	3	4	Total
Golden Hurricane	7	7	7	3	24
Owls	7	14	0	14	35

=== South Florida ===
	1	2	3	4	Total
Bulls	7	0	14	17	38
Golden Hurricane	17	10	3	0	30

=== At Memphis ===
	1	2	3	4	Total
Golden Hurricane	7	7	0	6	20
Tigers	0	20	6	14	40

=== SMU ===
	1	2	3	4	Total
Mustangs	13	0	0	15	28
Golden Hurricane	14	14	7	3	38

=== At Central Florida ===
	1	2	3	4	Total
Golden Hurricane	0	7	0	0	7
Knights	3	14	14	0	31

=== At Houston ===
	1	2	3	4	Total
Golden Hurricane	0	7	14	7	28
Cougars	14	0	14	10	38

=== East Carolina ===
	1	2	3	4	Total
Pirates	14	7	14	14	49
Golden Hurricane	14	0	11	7	32
