= Matt DeGennaro =

American football player (born 1969)

Profile
- Position: Quarterback

Personal information
- Born: May 1969 (age 57)
- Listed height: 6 ft 2 in (1.88 m)
- Listed weight: 205 lb (93 kg)

Career information
- High school: Union (Union Township, New Jersey)
- College: Connecticut (1987–1990)
- NFL draft: 1991: undrafted

Career history
- Connecticut Coyotes (1996)

Awards and highlights
- Yankee Conference Offensive Player of the Year (1988); Yankee Conference Rookie of the Year (1987)

Career AFL statistics
- Comp. / Att.: 33 / 64
- Passing yards: 413
- TD–INT: 6–7
- QB rating: 55.79
- Stats at ArenaFan.com

Matt DeGennaro (born May 1969) is an American former professional football quarterback who played one season with the Connecticut Coyotes of the Arena Football League (AFL). He played college football at the University of Connecticut.

== Early life ==
DeGennaro was born in May 1969. He attended Union High School in Union Township, Union County, New Jersey.

== College career ==
DeGennaro was a four-year starter and letterman for the Connecticut Huskies from 1987 to 1990. He completed 193 passes for 2,206 yards and 18 touchdowns as a freshman in 1987 as the Huskies finished with a 7–4 record. His completion and passing yard totals set single season school records. He earned Yankee Conference Rookie of the Year honors. DeGennaro completed 238 of 387 passes for 2,633 yards, 17 touchdowns, and 13 interceptions in 1988 as the Huskies had a 7–4 record for the second consecutive season. He broke his single season completion and passing yard records from 1987 and was named the Yankee Conference Offensive Player of the Year. He also garnered honorable mention All-American honors in 1988. In 1989, DeGennaro totaled 212 completions on 356 passing attempts for 2,472 yards, 17 touchdowns and 15 interceptions as the Huskies finished 8–3, good for a share of the conference title. He recorded 160 completions on 257 attempts for 1,977 yards, 21 touchdowns, and eight interceptions his senior year in 1990 as the team went 6–5. He also missed four games his senior year due to a separated shoulder.

== Professional career ==
Pre-draft measurables
| Height | Weight | Arm length | Hand span | 40-yard dash | 10-yard split | 20-yard split | 20-yard shuttle | Vertical jump |
|---|---|---|---|---|---|---|---|---|
| 6 ft 0.7 in (1.85 m) | 206 lb (93 kg) | 31 in (0.79 m) | 9.63 in (0.24 m) | 4.95 s | 1.76 s | 2.89 s | 4.51 s | 29.5 in (0.75 m) |
All values from NFL Combine

DeGennaro was invited to the 1991 NFL Combine but was not selected in the 1991 NFL draft. He played in 12 games for the Connecticut Coyotes of the Arena Football League in 1996, completing 33 of 64 passes (51.6%) for 413 yards, six touchdowns, and seven interceptions.

== Coaching career ==
DeGennaro was an assistant football coach at Bloomfield High School in 1994 and Bergen Catholic High School in 1995.

== Personal life ==
DeGennaro's son, Nick, plays in the NFL as a wide receiver for the Washington Commanders.
