= 2014 UConn Huskies football team =

American college football season

2014 UConn Huskies football
- Conference: American Athletic Conference
- Record: 2–10 (1–7 AAC)
- Head coach: Bob Diaco (1st season)
- Offensive coordinator: Mike Cummings (1st season)
- Offensive scheme: Spread
- Defensive coordinator: Anthony Poindexter (1st season)
- Base defense: 3–4
- Home stadium: Rentschler Field

2014 American Athletic Conference football standings
	Conf.			Overall
Team	W		L	W		L
No. 25 Memphis +	7	–	1	10	–	3
Cincinnati +	7	–	1	9	–	4
UCF +	7	–	1	9	–	4
East Carolina	5	–	3	8	–	5
Houston	5	–	3	8	–	5
Temple	4	–	4	6	–	6
South Florida	3	–	5	4	–	8
Tulane	2	–	6	3	–	9
Tulsa	2	–	6	2	–	10
UConn	1	–	7	2	–	10
SMU	1	–	7	1	–	11
+ – Conference co-champions; Rankings from AP Poll

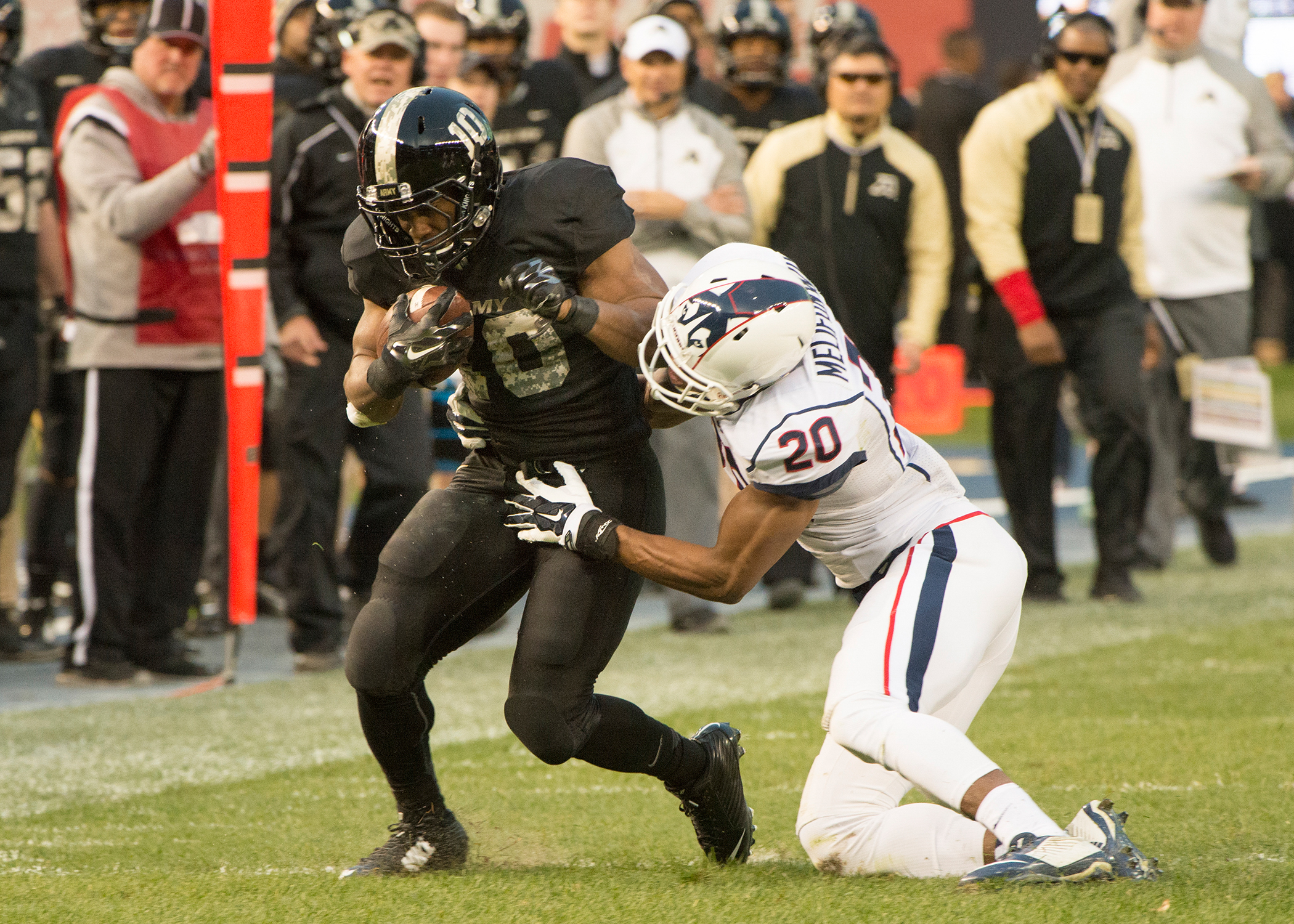
Army Black Knights vs. UConn Huskies football game at Yankee Stadium in November 2014

The 2014 UConn Huskies football team represented the University of Connecticut (UConn) as a member of the American Athletic Conference (AAC) during the 2014 NCAA Division I FBS football season. Led by first-year head coach Bob Diaco, the Huskies compiled an overall record of 2–10 with a mark of 1–7 in conference play, tying for tenth place at the bottom of the standings in the AAC. The team played home games at Rentschler Field in East Hartford, Connecticut.

== Schedule ==
Date	Time	Opponent	Site	TV	Result	Attendance
August 29	7:00 pm	BYU*	Rentschler Field; East Hartford, CT	ESPN	L 10–35	35,150
September 6	12:00 pm	Stony Brook*	Rentschler Field; East Hartford, CT	SNY	W 19–16	23,543
September 13	12:00 pm	Boise State*	Rentschler Field; East Hartford, CT	ABC, ESPN2	L 21–38	30,098
September 19	8:00 pm	at South Florida	Raymond James Stadium; Tampa, FL	ESPN	L 14–17	28,273
September 27	4:00 pm	Temple	Rentschler Field; East Hartford, CT	ESPNews	L 10–36	27,755
October 11	8:00 pm	at Tulane	Yulman Stadium; New Orleans, LA	ESPNews	L 3–12	23,076
October 23	7:00 pm	at No. 18 East Carolina	Dowdy–Ficklen Stadium; Greenville, NC	ESPNU	L 21–31	40,152
November 1	12:00 pm	UCF^{†}	Rentschler Field; East Hartford, CT (Civil Conflict)	CBSSN	W 37–29	28,751
November 8	3:30 pm	vs. Army*	Yankee Stadium; Bronx, NY	CBSSN	L 21–35	27,453
November 22	8:00 pm	Cincinnati	Rentschler Field; East Hartford, CT	CBSSN	L 0–41	24,012
November 29	4:00 pm	at Memphis	Liberty Bowl Memorial Stadium; Memphis, TN	ESPNews	L 10–41	35,102
December 6	12:00 pm	SMU	Rentschler Field; East Hartford, CT	CBSSN	L 20–27	22,921
*Non-conference game; ^{†}Homecoming; Rankings from AP Poll released prior to the game; All times are in Eastern time

== Game summaries ==
=== BYU ===
	1	2	3	4	Total
Cougars	14	14	0	7	35
Huskies	0	7	0	3	10

=== Stony Brook ===
	1	2	3	4	Total
Seawolves	10	0	0	6	16
Huskies	3	9	7	0	19

=== Boise State ===
	1	2	3	4	Total
Broncos	7	14	3	14	38
Huskies	3	7	11	0	21

=== South Florida ===
	1	2	3	4	Total
Huskies	0	7	0	7	14
Bulls	14	0	0	3	17

=== Temple ===
	1	2	3	4	Total
Owls	7	0	23	6	36
Huskies	0	3	7	0	10

=== Tulane ===
	1	2	3	4	Total
Huskies	3	0	0	0	3
Green Wave	7	0	2	3	12

=== East Carolina ===
	1	2	3	4	Total
Huskies	7	0	14	0	21
Pirates	14	0	7	10	31

=== UCF ===
	1	2	3	4	Total
Knights	7	7	7	8	29
Huskies	0	17	14	6	37

=== Army ===
	1	2	3	4	Total
Huskies	0	7	0	14	21
Black Knights	7	7	7	14	35

=== Cincinnati ===
	1	2	3	4	Total
Bearcats	7	20	14	0	41
Huskies	0	0	0	0	0

=== Memphis ===
	1	2	3	4	Total
Huskies	0	3	0	7	10
Tigers	6	7	21	7	41

=== SMU ===
	1	2	3	4	Total
Mustangs	6	0	14	7	27
Huskies	6	14	0	0	20

== NFL draft ==
The following Huskies were selected in the 2015 NFL draft following the season.

Round	Pick	Player	Position	NFL team
1	27	Byron Jones	Defensive back	Dallas Cowboys
6	186	Geremy Davis	Wide receiver	New York Giants
