= 2014 Tulane Green Wave football team =

American college football season

2014 Tulane Green Wave football
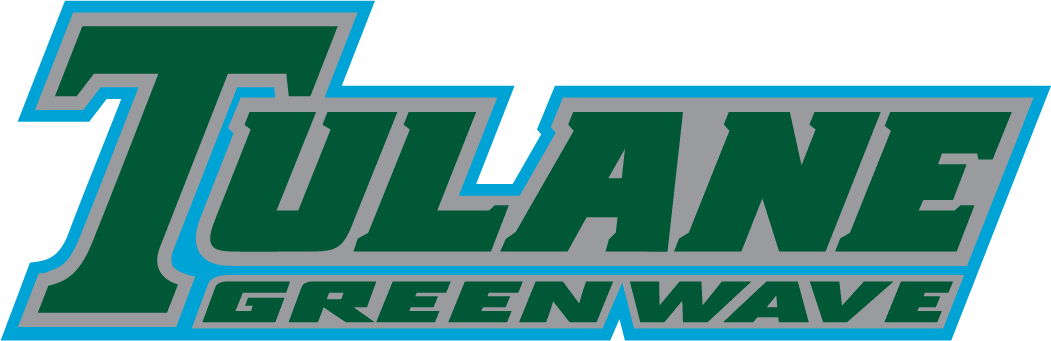
- Conference: American Athletic Conference
- Record: 3–9 (2–6 AAC)
- Head coach: Curtis Johnson (3rd season)
- Offensive coordinator: Eric Price (3rd season)
- Offensive scheme: Pro-style
- Co-defensive coordinators: Jon Sumrall (3rd season); Lionel Washington (3rd season)
- Base defense: 3–4 or 4–3
- Home stadium: Yulman Stadium

2014 American Athletic Conference football standings
	Conf.			Overall
Team	W		L	W		L
No. 25 Memphis +	7	–	1	10	–	3
Cincinnati +	7	–	1	9	–	4
UCF +	7	–	1	9	–	4
East Carolina	5	–	3	8	–	5
Houston	5	–	3	8	–	5
Temple	4	–	4	6	–	6
South Florida	3	–	5	4	–	8
Tulane	2	–	6	3	–	9
Tulsa	2	–	6	2	–	10
UConn	1	–	7	2	–	10
SMU	1	–	7	1	–	11
+ – Conference co-champions; Rankings from AP Poll

The 2014 Tulane Green Wave football team represented Tulane University in the 2014 NCAA Division I FBS football season. They were led by third-year head coach Curtis Johnson and played home games at Yulman Stadium. They were in their first year of membership in the American Athletic Conference, and it was the Green Wave's first season on its Uptown campus since the 1974 season. They finished the season 3–9, 2–6 in AAC play to finish in a tie for eighth place.

== Pre-season ==
=== Recruits ===
College recruiting information (2014)
Name	Hometown	School	Height	Weight	40^{‡}	Commit date
Kendall Ardoin; TE	Ville Platte, LA	Ville Platte	6 ft 6 in (1.98 m)	215 lb (98 kg)	4.6	Jun 16, 2013
Kendall Ardoin; TE	Recruit ratings: Scout: Rivals: 247Sports: (NR)					
Eric Bowie; LB	Monroe, LA	Ouchita Parish	6 ft 2 in (1.88 m)	215 lb (98 kg)	4.7	Aug 4, 2013
Eric Bowie; LB	Recruit ratings: Scout: Rivals: 247Sports: (NR)					
Glen Cuiellette; QB	Mandeville, LA	Mandeville	6 ft 1 in (1.85 m)	205 lb (93 kg)	N/A	Feb 27, 2013
Glen Cuiellette; QB	Recruit ratings: Scout: Rivals: 247Sports: ESPN: (72)					
Raul Diaz; OL	Miami, FL	Miami Central	6 ft 2 in (1.88 m)	277 lb (126 kg)	5.0	Oct 30, 2013
Raul Diaz; OL	Recruit ratings: Scout: Rivals: 247Sports: ESPN: (73)					
Andrew DiRocco; K	Fort Lauderdale, FL	University School of Nova SE University	6 ft 1 in (1.85 m)	180 lb (82 kg)	N/A	Jul 30, 2013
Andrew DiRocco; K	Recruit ratings: Scout: Rivals: 247Sports: ESPN: (74)					
Braynon Edwards; DT	Miami, FL	Gulliver Prep	6 ft 1 in (1.85 m)	370 lb (170 kg)	N/A	Jun 25, 2013
Braynon Edwards; DT	Recruit ratings: Scout: Rivals: 247Sports: (NR)					
Terren Encalade; WR	Belle Chasse, LA	Belle Chasse	6 ft 0 in (1.83 m)	185 lb (84 kg)	N/A	Aug 17, 2013
Terren Encalade; WR	Recruit ratings: Scout: Rivals: 247Sports: (NR)					
Rene Fleury; LB	New Orleans, LA	McDonogh 35	6 ft 1 in (1.85 m)	210 lb (95 kg)	N/A	Aug 8, 2013
Rene Fleury; LB	Recruit ratings: Scout: Rivals: 247Sports: (NR)					
Zachery Harris; LB	New Orleans, LA	Holy Cross	6 ft 0 in (1.83 m)	220 lb (100 kg)	N/A	Dec 13, 2013
Zachery Harris; LB	Recruit ratings: Scout: Rivals: 247Sports: (NR)					
Dontrell Hilliard; RB	Baton Rouge, LA	Scotlandville	6 ft 0 in (1.83 m)	185 lb (84 kg)	N/A	Jan 16, 2014
Dontrell Hilliard; RB	Recruit ratings: Scout: Rivals: 247Sports: (NR)					
Leondre James; Ath	Donaldsonville, LA	Donaldsonville	6 ft 0 in (1.83 m)	175 lb (79 kg)	4.5	Jun 14, 2013
Leondre James; Ath	Recruit ratings: Scout: Rivals: 247Sports: (NR)					
Devon Johnson; OL	Amite, LA	Amite	6 ft 4 in (1.93 m)	260 lb (120 kg)	N/A	Nov 25, 2013
Devon Johnson; OL	Recruit ratings: Scout: Rivals: 247Sports: (NR)					
Charles Jones; TE	New Orleans, LA	St. Augustine	6 ft 3 in (1.91 m)	235 lb (107 kg)	N/A	Jan 30, 2014
Charles Jones; TE	Recruit ratings: Scout: Rivals: 247Sports: ESPN: (67)					
Robert Kennedy; LB	Belle Chasse, LA	Belle Chasse	6 ft 1 in (1.85 m)	230 lb (100 kg)	4.5	Nov 12, 2013
Robert Kennedy; LB	Recruit ratings: Scout: Rivals: 247Sports: (NR)					
John Leglue; OL	Alexandria, LA	Holy Savior Menard	6 ft 6 in (1.98 m)	282 lb (128 kg)	N/A	Feb 6, 2014
John Leglue; OL	Recruit ratings: Scout: Rivals: 247Sports: (NR)					
Donnie Lewis; DB	Baton Rouge, LA	Central	5 ft 11 in (1.80 m)	170 lb (77 kg)	4.5	Dec 2, 2013
Donnie Lewis; DB	Recruit ratings: Scout: Rivals: 247Sports: (NR)					
Stephon Lofton; DB	New Orleans, LA	Miller-McCoy	5 ft 11 in (1.80 m)	195 lb (88 kg)	N/A	Aug 1, 2013
Stephon Lofton; DB	Recruit ratings: Scout: Rivals: 247Sports: (NR)					
RaeJuan Marbley; LB	Destrehan, LA	Destrehan	6 ft 0 in (1.83 m)	215 lb (98 kg)	N/A	Aug 10, 2013
RaeJuan Marbley; LB	Recruit ratings: Scout: Rivals: 247Sports: ESPN: (74)					
Trey Scott; TE	Powder Springs, GA	McEachern	6 ft 2 in (1.88 m)	205 lb (93 kg)	N/A	Sep 7, 2013
Trey Scott; TE	Recruit ratings: Scout: Rivals: 247Sports: (NR)					
Niguel Veal; Ath	Harvey, LA	West Jefferson	5 ft 11 in (1.80 m)	175 lb (79 kg)	N/A	Oct 19, 2013
Niguel Veal; Ath	Recruit ratings: Scout: Rivals: 247Sports: ESPN: (75)					
Daren Williams; DE	Reserve, LA	East St. John	6 ft 4 in (1.93 m)	235 lb (107 kg)	N/A	Feb 3, 2014
Daren Williams; DE	Recruit ratings: Scout: Rivals: 247Sports: ESPN: (73)					
Sean Wilson; DE	Port Sulphur, LA	South Plaquemines	6 ft 4 in (1.93 m)	265 lb (120 kg)	N/A	Apr 11, 2013
Sean Wilson; DE	Recruit ratings: Scout: Rivals: 247Sports: (NR)					
Peter Woullard; DE	New Orleans, LA	St. Augustine	6 ft 3 in (1.91 m)	240 lb (110 kg)	N/A	Jun 5, 2013
Peter Woullard; DE	Recruit ratings: Scout: Rivals: 247Sports: ESPN: (70)					
Overall recruit ranking: Scout: 101 Rivals: 83 247Sports: 90
‡ Refers to 40-yard dash; Note: In many cases, Scout, Rivals, 247Sports, On3, and ESPN may conflict in their listings of height, weight and 40 time.; In these cases, the average was taken. ESPN grades are on a 100-point scale.; Sources: "2014 Tulane Football Commitment List". Rivals.; "2014 Tulane Commits". Scout.; "Tulane Green Wave 2014". ESPN.; "Scout.com Team Recruiting Rankings". Scout.; "2014 Team Ranking". Rivals.com.; "2014 Tulane Green Wave football team". 247Sports.

=== Award watch lists ===
Lorenzo Doss

- Walter Camp Award Watch List
- Chuck Bednarik Award Watch List
- Bronko Nagurski Trophy Watch List
- Jim Thorpe Award Watch List
- College Football Performance Award (CFPA) Defensive Back Trophy Watch List

== Roster ==
2014 Tulane Green Wave football team roster
Players
Coaches
Offense

Pos.	#	Name	Class
QB	1	Devin Powell	So
RB	3	Sherman Badie	Fr
WR	8	Devon Breaux	So
WR	9	Teddy Veal	Fr
QB	11	Nick Montana	Sr
QB	12	Tanner Lee	Fr
QB	14	Glen Cuiellette	Fr
WR	15	Marc Edwards	Jr
QB	16	Jordy Joseph	Sr
WR	19	Terren Encalade	Fr
RB	22	Marshall Wadleigh	So
RB	24	Danté Butler	Sr
RB	25	Josh Rounds	Jr
RB	26	Dontrell Hilliard	Fr
RB	28	Rob Kelley	Sr
WR	29	Alex O'Neill	So
RB	33	Lazedrick Thompson	So
WR	36	Devin Boutte	Sr
WR	42	Carlos Wilson	Sr
WR	44	Alec Macias	Jr
WR	49	JoJo Dobbs	Sr
C	50	Brandon Godfrey	Fr
OL	51	Junior Diaz	Fr
OL	60	Preston Paine	Sr
OT	61	Colton Hanson	So
G	66	Nathan Shienle	So
G	67	Bob Bradley	Jr
OT	68	Arturo Uzdavinis	Jr
OT	70	Sean Donnelly	Sr
G	71	Jason Stewart	Fr
OT	72	John Leglue	Fr
G	73	Alex Paul	So
OT	74	Devon Johnson	Fr
G	75	Chris Taylor	So
OT	76	Nate Skold	Jr
OT	78	Todd Jacquet	Jr
OT	79	Kenneth Santa Marina	Fr
WR	80	Justyn Shackleford	Sr
TE	81	Sydie London	Jr
WR	82	Xavier Rush	Sr
WR	83	Fudge Van Hooser	So
TE	84	Charles Jones	Fr
WR	85	Larry Dace	Jr
WR	86	Sam Winston	Jr
TE	88	Matt Marfisi	Sr
WR	89	Thomas Vaughan	Jr
TE	89	Kendall Ardoin	Fr
TE	83	Trey Scott	Fr

Defense

Pos.	#	Name	Class
S	2	Darion Monroe	Jr
CB	4	Taurean Nixon	Sr
S	5	Brandon LeBeau	Sr
CB	6	Lorenzo Doss	Jr
LB	7	Edward Williams	So
DB	10	Leonard Davis	So
CB	13	William Townsend	Fr
CB	17	Parry Nickerson	Fr
LB	20	Nico Marley	So
CB	21	Donnie Lewis	Fr
CB	23	Richard Allen	So
S	27	Richard Carthon	Jr
DB	30	Tristan Cooper	Fr
CB	32	Stephon Lofton	Fr
CB	34	Jarrod Franklin	So
S	35	Sam Scofield	Sr
LB	37	Rene Fleury	Fr
S	38	Anthony Bronzo	Sr
LB	40	Zachery Harris	Fr
DE	41	Aaron Bryant	Jr
DE	43	Tyler Gilbert	Sr
DE	44	Luke Jackson	Fr
LB	45	Matthew Bailey	Sr
LB	46	Sergio Medina	So
DE	48	Royce LaFrance	Jr
LB	51	Max Herman	So
LB	52	Eric Thomas	So
DE	53	Andre Robinson	Sr
DE	54	Quinlan Carroll	Fr
LB	55	Eric Bowie	Fr
LB	56	Rae Juan Marbley	Fr
DE	57	Peter Woullard	Fr
LB	58	Brandon Schmidt	Sr
LB	59	David Laborde	Jr
DT	65	Braynon Edwards	Fr
DT	77	Tanzel Smart	So
DE	87	Ade Aruna	Fr
DE	90	Trey Cammisa	Fr
DT	91	Eldrick Washington	Fr
DE	92	Daren Williams	Fr
DT	93	Kenny Welcome	Sr
DT	94	Sean Wilson	Fr
DT	96	Corey Redwine	Jr
DT	98	Eric Bell	Fr
DT	99	Calvin Thomas	So
LB	90	Robert Kennedy	Fr

Special teams

Pos.	#	Name	Class
K	28	Andrew DiRocco	Fr
P	31	Peter Picerelli	Jr
K	36	Trevor Simms	Sr
K	59	Brandon Purcell	So
P, K	62	Steven Broccoli	Jr
K, P	63	Casey Spinelli	So
P, P	69	Aaron Root	So
A	86	Leondre James	Fr
P, K	95	Logan Hilton	Jr
DS	97	Michael Lizanich	So

Head coach

- Curtis Johnson (3rd season)

Coordinators/assistant coaches

- Eric Price – Offensive coordinator
- Jon Sumrall – Co-defensive coordinator/linebackers
- Lionel Washington – Co-defensive coordinator/secondary
- Kwahn Drake – Defensive line
- David Johnson – Tight ends/running backs
- John McDonell – Offensive line
- Aaron Price – Quarterbacks
- Jason Rollins – Secondary/special teams
- Keith Williams – Wide receivers
- Byron Ellis – Director of football operations
- Doug Lichtenberger – Assistant ad for football operations/recruiting
- Chad Jenkins – Graduate assistant, Defense
- Trey Johnson – Graduate assistant, Offense
- Matt Jones – Graduate assistant, Offense
- Bradley Mathews – Graduate assistant for Recruiting & Operations
- Joel Gastright – "Equipment Manager"

Legend

- (C) Team captain
- (S) Suspended
- (I) Ineligible
- Injured
- Redshirt

Roster
Last update: March 19, 2014

== Schedule ==
Date	Time	Opponent	Site	TV	Result	Attendance
August 28	7:00 pm	at Tulsa	Skelly Field at H. A. Chapman Stadium; Tulsa, OK	CBSSN	L 31–38 ^{2OT}	19,032
September 6	3:00 pm	Georgia Tech*	Yulman Stadium; New Orleans, LA	ESPNews	L 21–38	30,000
September 13	7:00 pm	No. 3 (FCS) Southeastern Louisiana*	Yulman Stadium; New Orleans, LA	ESPN3	W 35–20	26,358
September 20	11:30 am	at Duke*	Wallace Wade Stadium; Durham, NC	ACCN/FSNO	L 13–47	20,197
September 27	11:00 am	at Rutgers*	High Point Solutions Stadium; Piscataway, NJ	ESPNews	L 6–31	48,361
October 11	7:00 pm	UConn	Yulman Stadium; New Orleans, LA	ESPNews	W 12–3	23,076
October 18	11:00 am	at UCF	Bright House Networks Stadium; Orlando, FL	ESPNU	L 13–20	35,015
October 31	7:00 pm	Cincinnati	Yulman Stadium; New Orleans, LA	ESPN2	L 14–38	21,414
November 8	2:30 pm	at Houston	TDECU Stadium; Houston, TX	ESPNU	W 31–24	32,205
November 15	2:30 pm	Memphis^{†}	Yulman Stadium; New Orleans, LA	ESPNU	L 7–38	28,614
November 22	2:30 pm	at East Carolina	Dowdy–Ficklen Stadium; Greenville, NC	ESPN3	L 6–34	48,433
December 6	6:30 pm	Temple	Yulman Stadium; New Orleans, LA	ESPN2	L 3–10	20,612
*Non-conference game; ^{†}Homecoming; Rankings from AP Poll released prior to the game; All times are in Central time

== Game summaries ==
=== Tulsa ===
Tulane at Tulsa

Team	1	2	3	4	OT	2OT	Total
Tulane	7	14	0	7	3	0	31
• Tulsa	0	14	3	11	3	7	38

- Location: Tulsa, OK
- Game start: 7:00 p.m. CDT
- Game attendance: 19,032
- TV announcers (CBSSN): Dave Ryan, Corey Chavous, Lauren Gardner

=== UCF ===
Tulane at UCF

Team	1	2	3	4	Total
Tulane	3	0	3	7	13
• UCF	0	13	7	0	20

- Location: Orlando, FL
- Game start: 12:00 p.m. EDT
- Game attendance: 35,015
- TV announcers (ESPNU): Adam Amin, John Congemi

=== Cincinnati ===
Cincinnati at Tulane

Team	1	2	3	4	Total
• Cincinnati	10	14	7	7	38
Tulane	0	0	14	0	14

- Location: New Orleans, LA
- Game start: 7:00 p.m. CDT
- Game attendance: 21,414
- TV announcers (ABC/ESPN2): Dave Flemming, Danny Kanell, Allison Williams

=== Houston ===
Tulane at Houston

Team	1	2	3	4	Total
• Tulane	7	7	7	10	31
Houston	7	10	0	7	24

- Location: Houston, TX
- Game start: 2:30 p.m. CST
- Game attendance: 32,205
- TV announcers (ESPNU): Clay Matvick, Anthony Becht

After the Wave took a 31–17 lead late in the 4th quarter, the Cougars scored a touchdown and then recovered an onside kick, driving into the red zone. On the last play of the game though, Parry Nickerson made his second interception of the night as time expired. With starters Sherman Badie and Lazedrick Thompson injured for the game, all 31 of the Green Wave's points were scored by true freshmen – Teddy Veal, Dontrell Hilliard, Leondre James, and Andrew DiRocco. The win snapped a 10-game losing streak to Houston, and an 18-game losing streak in games played outside the state of Louisiana.

=== Memphis ===
Memphis at Tulane
(Homecoming)

Team	1	2	3	4	Total
• Memphis	7	3	21	7	38
Tulane	0	0	0	7	7

- Location: New Orleans, LA
- Game start: 2:30 p.m. CST
- Game attendance: 28,614
- TV announcers (ESPNU): Eamon McAnaney, Dan Hawkins

=== East Carolina ===
Tulane at East Carolina

Team	1	2	3	4	Total
Tulane	0	3	0	3	6
• ECU	10	7	3	14	34

- Location: Greenville, NC
- Game start: 3:30 EST
- Game attendance: 48.433
- TV announcers (ESPN3): Drew Fellios, Al Groh

=== Temple ===
Temple at Tulane

Team	1	2	3	4	Total
• Temple	0	3	0	7	10
Tulane	3	0	0	0	3

- Location: New Orleans, LA
- Game start: 6:30 p.m. CST
- Game attendance: 20,612
- TV announcers (ESPN2): Mark Jones, Rod Gilmore, Jessica Mendoza

== Awards ==
=== American Athletic Conference Weekly Honors ===
Week 1

- Sherman Badie – Weekly Honor Roll

Week 3

- Nico Marley – Weekly Honor Roll

Week 7

- Darion Monroe – Weekly Honor Roll

Week 11

- Parry Nickerson – Defensive Player of the Week
- Dontrell Hilliard – Weekly Honor Roll
- Tanner Lee – Weekly Honor Roll
