= 2014 Temple Owls football team =

American college football season

2014 Temple Owls football
- Conference: American Athletic Conference
- Record: 6–6 (4–4 The American)
- Head coach: Matt Rhule (2nd season)
- Offensive coordinator: Marcus Satterfield (2nd season)
- Offensive scheme: Spread
- Defensive coordinator: Phil Snow (2nd season)
- Base defense: 4–3
- Home stadium: Lincoln Financial Field

2014 American Athletic Conference football standings
	Conf.			Overall
Team	W		L	W		L
No. 25 Memphis +	7	–	1	10	–	3
Cincinnati +	7	–	1	9	–	4
UCF +	7	–	1	9	–	4
East Carolina	5	–	3	8	–	5
Houston	5	–	3	8	–	5
Temple	4	–	4	6	–	6
South Florida	3	–	5	4	–	8
Tulane	2	–	6	3	–	9
Tulsa	2	–	6	2	–	10
UConn	1	–	7	2	–	10
SMU	1	–	7	1	–	11
+ – Conference co-champions; Rankings from AP Poll

The 2014 Temple Owls football team represented Temple University in the 2014 NCAA Division I FBS football season. The Owls were led by second-year head coach Matt Rhule and played their home games at Lincoln Financial Field. They were members of the American Athletic Conference. They finished the season 6–6, 4–4 in AAC play to finish in sixth place. Despite being bowl eligible, Temple was not invited to a bowl game.

== Schedule ==
Date	Time	Opponent	Site	TV	Result	Attendance
August 28	10:50 p.m.	at Vanderbilt*	Vanderbilt Stadium; Nashville, TN	SECN	W 37–7	31,731
September 6	1:00 p.m.	Navy*	Lincoln Financial Field; Philadelphia, PA	ESPN3	L 24–31	28,408
September 20	1:00 p.m.	Delaware State*	Lincoln Financial Field; Philadelphia, PA	ESPN3	W 59–0	19,202
September 27	4:00 p.m.	at UConn	Rentschler Field; East Hartford, CT	ESPNews	W 36–10	27,755
October 11	12:00 p.m.	Tulsa^{†}	Lincoln Financial Field; Philadelphia, PA	ESPNews	W 35–24	25,340
October 17	9:00 p.m.	at Houston	TDECU Stadium; Houston, TX	ESPNU	L 10–31	21,471
October 25	5:00 p.m.	at UCF	Bright House Networks Stadium; Orlando, FL	CBSSN	L 14–34	39,554
November 1	12:00 p.m.	No. 21 East Carolina	Lincoln Financial Field; Philadelphia, PA	ESPNews	W 20–10	22,130
November 7	7:30 p.m.	Memphis	Lincoln Financial Field; Philadelphia, PA	ESPNU	L 13–16	23,882
November 15	12:00 p.m.	at Penn State*	Beaver Stadium; University Park, PA	ESPN2	L 13–30	100,173
November 29	12:00 p.m.	Cincinnati	Lincoln Financial Field; Philadelphia, PA	ESPNews	L 6–14	21,255
December 6	7:30 p.m.	at Tulane	Yulman Stadium; New Orleans, LA	ESPN2	W 10–3	20,612
*Non-conference game; ^{†}Homecoming; Rankings from AP Poll released prior to the game; All times are in Eastern time

== Awards and accomplishments ==
=== All-Conference teams ===
American Athletic Conference First Team: Tyler Matakevich
American Athletic Conference Second Team: Kyle Friend, Praise Martin-Oguike, Matt Ioannidis
American Athletic Conference Honorable Mention: Tavon Young

=== Players of the Week ===
American Athletic Conference Defensive Player of the Week:

Week 1 - Tavon Young
Week 5 - Praise Martin-Oguike
Week 10 - Praise Martin-Oguike

American Athletic Conference Special Teams Player of the Week:

Week 5 - Austin Jones

== National statistical rankings ==
Scoring Offense: 23.1 points per game (97th nationally) Scoring Defense: 17.5 points per game (4th nationally)

== NFL Players ==
=== Undrafted Free Agents ===
Following the NFL draft, Kenneth Harper signed a contract with the New York Giants.

#	Name	POS	HT	WT	NFL Club	Ref
#4	Kenneth Harper	RB	6-0	225 lbs	Giants	
