= Noel Thomas Jr. =

American football player (born 1994)

No. 5
- Position: Wide receiver

Personal information
- Born: September 18, 1994 (age 32); Norwalk, Connecticut, U.S.
- Listed height: 6 ft 1 in (1.85 m)
- Listed weight: 205 lb (93 kg)

Career information
- High school: St. Luke's School
- College: UConn
- NFL draft: 2017: undrafted

Career history
- Detroit Lions (2017)*; Ottawa Redblacks (2018–2019)
- * Offseason or practice squad member only

Awards and highlights
- Second-team All-AAC (2016)

Career CFL statistics
- Receptions: 27
- Receiving yards: 274
- Receiving touchdowns: 1
- Stats at CFL.ca
- Stats at Pro Football Reference

Noel Thomas Jr. (born September 18, 1994) is an American former professional football wide receiver who played for the Ottawa Redblacks of the Canadian Football League (CFL). He played college football at University of Connecticut. He was also a member of the Detroit Lions of the National Football League.

== Early life ==
Thomas was named New England Preparatory School Athletic Council Class C All-New England and MSG Varsity's Connecticut Player of the Year as a wide receiver, running back and quarterback his senior year for his father's NEPSAC Class C championship St. Lukes team.

== College career ==
Thomas finished his career at UConn setting the school's single season receptions record with 100 catches for 1,179 yards in 2016. His 8.3 receptions per game was fifth in the nation and third in the AAC. Thomas' 183 career receptions was fourth most in school history. His 2,235 yards was eighth most.

Among Thomas' collegiate accolades:

- Walter Camp Football Foundation Connecticut Player of the Year Award (2016)
- 2016 Second-team All-American Athletic Conference (2016)
- All-New England (2015, 2016)
- All-ECAC honors (2016)
- NFLPA Collegiate Bowl participant
- NFL Scouting Combine invitee

== Professional career ==
=== Detroit Lions ===
He signed with the Detroit Lions as an undrafted free agent in 2017. Although he did not initially make the 53-man roster for the start of the season he was added to the Lions practice roster on September 6, 2017. He was not re-signed by the club following the 2017 season.

=== Ottawa Redblacks ===
Thomas signed with the Ottawa Redblacks of the Canadian Football League (CFL) for their 2018 season, and played in five games in his first season catching 12 passes for 151 yards with one touchdown. In his second year in the CFL Thomas played four games with the Redblacks, catching 15 passes for 123 yards. He was released by Ottawa in the middle of the season on August 13, 2019.
