= Chandler Whitmer =

American football coach (born 1991)

Tampa Bay Buccaneers
- Title: Quarterbacks coach

Personal information
- Born: August 16, 1991 (age 35)

Career information
- Position: Quarterback
- High school: Downers Grove South (Downers Grove, Illinois)
- College: Illinois (2010); Butler CC (2011); UConn (2012–2014)

Career history
- Yale (2018) Graduate assistant; Ohio State (2019) Graduate assistant; Clemson (2020) Graduate assistant; Los Angeles Chargers (2021–2023) Offensive quality control coach; Atlanta Falcons (2024) Pass game specialist; Indiana (2025) Co-offensive coordinator & quarterbacks coach; Tampa Bay Buccaneers (2026–present) Quarterbacks coach

Awards and highlights
- As assistant coach: CFP national champion (2025)

Chandler William Whitmer (born August 16, 1991) is an American football coach who is currently the quarterbacks coach for the Tampa Bay Buccaneers of the National Football League (NFL).

== Playing career ==
=== Illinois ===
Coming out of Downers Grove South High School, Whitmer was rated as a four-star recruit and committed to play college football for the Illinois Fighting Illini. After redshirting during the 2010 season, Whitmer entered his name into the NCAA transfer portal after the season.

=== Butler CC ===
Whitmer transferred to play for Butler Community College. In his lone season as the starter at Butler, he completed 180 of his 316 passing attempts for 3,022 yards with 25 touchdowns and 14 interceptions.

=== UConn ===
After one season with Butler Community College in 2011, Whitmer transferred to play for the UConn Huskies. Heading into the 2012 season, he beat out Johnny McEntee for the starting job. Whitmer retained his starting position in 2013 season. Overall, in three years with the Huskies, he appeared in 28 games and completed 56.5% of his passes for 5,082 yards, 25 touchdowns and 30 interceptions.

== Coaching career ==
In 2019, Whitmer got his first career coaching job, joining the Ohio State Buckeyes as a graduate assistant. In 2020, he joined the Clemson Tigers as a graduate assistant. Ahead of the 2021 season, Whitmer got his first NFL coaching job, as he was hired by the Los Angeles Chargers as an offensive quality control coach. On February 2, 2024, he was hired by the Atlanta Falcons to be the team's pass game specialist for the upcoming season. Ahead of the 2025 season, Whitmer was hired by the Indiana Hoosiers to serve as the team's co-offensive coordinator and quarterbacks coach following the departure of Tino Sunseri. At Indiana, Whitmer was quarterbacks coach for Fernando Mendoza, who won the Heisman Trophy as part of Indiana's national championship season.

On February 3, 2026, Whitmer was hired by the Tampa Bay Buccaneers to serve as the team's quarterbacks coach.
