= Geremy Davis =

American gridiron football player (born 1992)

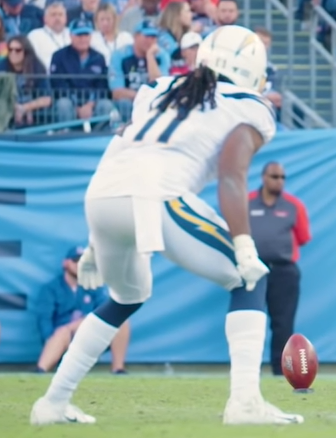
- Davis with the Los Angeles Chargers in 2019

No. 18, 81, 11
- Position: Wide receiver

Personal information
- Born: January 10, 1992 (age 34); Lawrenceville, Georgia, U.S.
- Listed height: 6 ft 3 in (1.91 m)
- Listed weight: 211 lb (96 kg)

Career information
- High school: Norcross (Norcross, Georgia)
- College: UConn (2010–2014)
- NFL draft: 2015: 6th round, 186th overall pick

Career history
- New York Giants (2015–2016); San Diego / Los Angeles Chargers (2016–2019); Detroit Lions (2020)*; Toronto Argonauts (2021)*
- * Offseason or practice squad member only

Career NFL statistics
- Receptions: 5
- Receiving yards: 59
- Stats at Pro Football Reference

Geremy Davis (born January 10, 1992) is an American former professional football player who was a wide receiver in the National Football League (NFL). He played college football for the UConn Huskies.

== College career ==
Davis set UConn Football Bowl Subdivision (FBS) records with 165 career receptions and 2,292 career receiving yards. He caught a pass in every game that he played in for the University of Connecticut.

== Professional career ==
=== New York Giants ===
Davis was selected by the New York Giants in the sixth round, 186th overall, of the 2015 NFL draft. He recorded his first career NFL reception in Week 2 of the 2015 NFL season in the Giants 24–20 loss to the Atlanta Falcons.

On September 3, 2016, Davis was released by the Giants and was signed to the practice squad the next day.

=== San Diego / Los Angeles Chargers ===
On November 9, 2016, Davis was signed by the San Diego Chargers off the Giants' practice squad.

On September 3, 2017, Davis was waived by the Chargers and was signed to the practice squad the next day. He was promoted to the active roster on September 11, 2017. He was waived on September 16, 2017, and re-signed to the practice squad. He was promoted back to the active roster on October 26, 2017.

On March 12, 2018, Davis re-signed with the Chargers.

On March 19, 2019, Davis re-signed with the Chargers. He was placed on injured reserve on November 30, 2019.

=== Detroit Lions ===
On March 30, 2020, Davis was signed by the Detroit Lions. He was released on September 1, 2020.

=== Toronto Argonauts ===
On February 12, 2021, Davis signed with the Toronto Argonauts of the Canadian Football League (CFL). He was released on July 20, 2021.

== Personal life ==
Geremy is a Christian.

Geremy started a YouTube channel by the name of "Golf and Gospel" in which he competes with various guests for nine holes as they discuss sports, music, food and the Gospel.
