= List of Houston Cougars football seasons =

The Houston Cougars football program is an NCAA Division I FBS football team that represents the University of Houston. The team is commonly referred to as "Houston" or "UH" (spoken as "U of H"). Houston has been a member of the Big 12 Conference since 2023. Since the beginning of the 2024 season, the Cougars have been coached by Willie Fritz, the program's 16th head coach. The team played its first season in 1946 and has since won or tied for 11 conference championships and six division championships. The Cougars have played in 31 post-season bowl games with a record of 14–16–1.

== Seasons ==
Year	Coach	Overall	Conference	Standing	Bowl/playoffs	Coaches^{#}	AP^{°}
Jewell Wallace (Lone Star Conference) (1946–1947)
1946	Houston	4–6	1–4	5th			
1947	Houston	3–8	0–6	7th			
Clyde Lee (Lone Star Conference) (1948)
1948	Houston	5–6	3–3	4th			
Clyde Lee (Gulf Coast Conference) (1949)
1949	Houston	5–4–1	1–2	3rd			
Clyde Lee (Independent) (1950)
1950	Houston	4–6					
Clyde Lee (Missouri Valley Conference) (1951–1954)
1951	Houston	6–5	2–2	4th	W Salad		
1952	Houston	8–2	3–0	1st		19	
1953	Houston	4–4–1	1–2	T–3rd			
1954	Houston	5–5	3–1	2nd			
Bill Meek (Missouri Valley Conference) (1955–1956)
1955	Houston	6–4	2–2	3rd			
1956	Houston	7–2–1	4–0	1st			
Hal Lahar (Missouri Valley Conference) (1957–1959)
1957	Houston	5–4–1	3–0	1st			
1958	Houston	5–4	2–2	T–2nd			
1959	Houston	3–7	3–1	T–1st			
Hal Lahar (Independent) (1960–1961)
1960	Houston	6–4					
1961	Houston	5–4–1					
Bill Yeoman (Independent) (1962–1975)
1962	Houston	7–4			W Tangerine		
1963	Houston	2–8					
1964	Houston	2–6–1					
1965	Houston	4–5–1					
1966	Houston	8–2				17	
1967	Houston	7–3			Ineligible (Note: At this time, Houston was on probation from the NCAA, and therefore was not eligible to compete in any post-season bowl games.)	19	
1968	Houston	6–2–2			Ineligible (Note: At this time, Houston was on probation from the NCAA, and therefore was not eligible to compete in any post-season bowl games.)	20	18
1969	Houston	9–2			W Astro-Bluebonnet	16	12
1970	Houston	8–3				13	19
1971	Houston	9–3			L Astro-Bluebonnet	14	17
1972	Houston	6–4–1					
1973	Houston	11–1			W Astro-Bluebonnet	13	9
1974	Houston	8–3–1			T Astro-Bluebonnet	11	19
1975	Houston	2–8					
Bill Yeoman (Southwest Conference) (1976–1986)
1976	Houston	10–2	7–1	T–1st	W Cotton	4	4
1977	Houston	6–5	4–4	T–4th	Ineligible (Note: Houston was put on probation during this season for recruiting violations and was unable to compete in any bowl games.)		
1978	Houston	9–3	7–1	1st	L Cotton	11	10
1979	Houston	11–1	7–1	T–1st	W Cotton	5	5
1980	Houston	7–5	5–3	T–2nd	W Garden State		
1981	Houston	7–4–1	5–2–1	3rd	L Sun		
1982	Houston	5–5–1	4–3–1	4th			
1983	Houston	4–7	3–5	7th			
1984	Houston	7–5	6–2	T–1st	L Cotton		
1985	Houston	4–7	3–5	6th			
1986	Houston	1–10	0–8	9th			
Jack Pardee (Southwest Conference) (1987–1989)
1987	Houston	4–6–1	2–4–1	7th			
1988	Houston	9–3	5–2	3rd	L Aloha		18
1989	Houston	9–2	6–2	T–2nd	Ineligible (Note: Under probation by the NCAA from rules violated in prior seasons, Houston was disallowed from participating in a bowl game, television appearances, and the Coaches Poll.)		14
John Jenkins (Southwest Conference) (1990–1992)
1990	Houston	10–1	7–1	2nd	Ineligible (Note: Due to NCAA sanctions, Houston was ineligible to be invited to a bowl game and was banned from being ranked in the Coaches Poll.)		10
1991	Houston	4–7	3–5	7th			
1992	Houston	4–7	2–5	7th			
Kim Helton (Southwest Conference) (1993–1995)
1993	Houston	1–9–1	1–5–1	T–7th			
1994	Houston	1–10	1–6	6th			
1995	Houston	2–9	2–5	5th			
Kim Helton (Conference USA) (1996–1999)
1996	Houston	7–5	4–1	T–1st	L Liberty		
1997	Houston	3–8	2–4	T–4th			
1998	Houston	3–8	2–4	T–5th			
1999	Houston	7–4	3–3	6th			
Dana Dimel (Conference USA) (2000–2002)
2000	Houston	3–8	2–5	T–7th			
2001	Houston	0–11	0–7	10th			
2002	Houston	5–7	3–5	8th			
Art Briles (Conference USA) (2003–2007)
2003	Houston	7–6	4–4	T–6th	L Hawai'i		
2004	Houston	3–8	3–5	T–5th			
2005	Houston	6–6	4–4	T–3rd (West)	L Fort Worth		
2006	Houston	10–4	7–1	1st (West)	L Liberty		
2007	Houston (Note: After Briles resigned to accept the head coaching job at Baylor, Chris Thurmond served as interim head coach for the 2007 Texas Bowl.)	8–5	6–2	T–1st (West)	L Texas		
Kevin Sumlin (Conference USA) (2008–2011)
2008	Houston	8–5	6–2	3rd (West)	W Armed Forces		
2009	Houston	10–4	6–2	T–1st (West)	L Armed Forces		
2010	Houston	5–7	4–4	3rd (West)			
2011	Houston (Note: Sumlin left for Texas A&M University following the regular season. Tony Levine served as interim head coach for the Cougars in the TicketCity Bowl.)	13–1	8–0	1st (West)	W TicketCity	14	18
Tony Levine (Conference USA) (2012)
2012	Houston	5–7	4–4	T–3rd (West)			
Tony Levine (American Athletic Conference) (2013–2014)
2013	Houston	8–5	5–3	4th	L BBVA Compass		
2014	Houston (Note: David Gibbs coached the 2015 Armed Forces Bowl after Levine was fired.)	8–5	5–3	T–4th	W Armed Forces		
Tom Herman (American Athletic Conference) (2015–2016)
2015	Houston	13–1	7–1	T–1st (West)	W Peach^{†}	8	8
2016	Houston (Note: Herman left for Texas after the regular season; new head coach Major Applewhite coached the Cougars against San Diego State in the Las Vegas Bowl.)	9–4	5–3	T–3rd (West)	L Las Vegas		
Major Applewhite (American Athletic Conference) (2017–2018)
2017	Houston	7–5	5–3	2nd (West)	L Hawai'i		
2018	Houston	8–5	5–3	T–1st (West)	L Armed Forces		
Dana Holgorsen (American Athletic Conference) (2019–2022)
2019	Houston	4–8	2–6	T–5th (West)			
2020	Houston	3–5	3–3	6th	L New Mexico		
2021	Houston	12–2	8–0	T–1st	W Birmingham	17	17
2022	Houston	8–5	5–3	T–4th	W Independence		
Dana Holgorsen (Big 12 Conference) (2023)
2023	Houston	4–8	2–7	T–11th			
Willie Fritz (Big 12 Conference) (2024–present)
2024	Houston	4–8	3–6	T–11th			
2025	Houston	10–3	6–3	T–4th	W Texas	19	22
Total:		486–405–15					
National championship Conference title Conference division title or championship game berth
^{†}Indicates Bowl Coalition, Bowl Alliance, BCS, or CFP / New Years' Six bowl.; ^{#}Rankings from final Coaches Poll.; ^{°}Rankings from final AP Poll.
