= 2014 American Athletic Conference football season =

- League: NCAA Division I FBS (Football Bowl Subdivision)
- Sport: Football
- Duration: August 28, 2014 through January 2015
- Teams: 11
- TV partner: ESPN

2015 NFL Draft
- Top draft pick: Breshad Perriman (UCF)
- Picked by: Baltimore Ravens, 26th overall

Regular season
- League champions: UCF, Cincinnati, Memphis

Football seasons
- 2013 2015

2014 American Athletic Conference football standings
	Conf.			Overall
Team	W		L	W		L
No. 25 Memphis +	7	–	1	10	–	3
Cincinnati +	7	–	1	9	–	4
UCF +	7	–	1	9	–	4
East Carolina	5	–	3	8	–	5
Houston	5	–	3	8	–	5
Temple	4	–	4	6	–	6
South Florida	3	–	5	4	–	8
Tulane	2	–	6	3	–	9
Tulsa	2	–	6	2	–	10
UConn	1	–	7	2	–	10
SMU	1	–	7	1	–	11
+ – Conference co-champions; Rankings from AP Poll

The 2014 American Athletic Conference football season was the 24th NCAA Division I Football Bowl Subdivision football season of the American Athletic Conference (The American). The season was the second since the breakup of the former Big East Conference, which lasted in its original form from its creation in 1979 until 2013.

The 2014 season was the first with the new College Football Playoff in place. From 1998 to 2013, FBS postseason football was governed by the Bowl Championship Series. With the move to the new format, The American is no longer an Automatic Qualifying conference (AQ), and is considered a member of the "Group of Five" (G5) with Conference USA, the Mid-American Conference, Mountain West Conference, and the Sun Belt Conference. Whereas under the previous system the champion of The American was guaranteed an automatic berth to a BCS bowl game, now only the highest-ranked member of the "Group of Five" is guaranteed to receive a bid to one of the six major bowls.

The American consisted of 11 members: Cincinnati, East Carolina, Houston, Memphis, SMU, South Florida, Temple, Tulane, Tulsa, UCF, and UConn. The regular season and conference play began on August 28, when Temple visited Vanderbilt, and Tulane visited Tulsa.

== Previous season ==
The UCF Knights were the 2013 American Champions, finishing 8–0 in conference and 12–1 overall. The Knights earned the conference's final BCS automatic bid before college football moved to a playoff system. UCF upset No. 6 Baylor 52–42 in the 2014 Fiesta Bowl, and finished the year ranked in the Top–10.

In other bowl games, Cincinnati lost to North Carolina 39–17 in the Belk Bowl. In their final years as members of The American, Louisville defeated Miami 36–9 in the Russell Athletic Bowl, and Rutgers lost to Notre Dame 29–16 in the Pinstripe Bowl.

== Preseason ==
=== Coaching changes ===
- Bob Diaco was hired to replace Paul Pasqualoni (and interim coach T. J. Weist) at Connecticut.
- George O'Leary signed a contract extension with UCF.
- September 8 – SMU Head Coach June Jones resigned Citing personal issues, Defensive Coordinator Tom Mason was interim head coach at SMU
- December 1 – Tulsa fired Head Coach Bill Blankenship

=== Preseason Poll ===
The 2013 American Athletic Conference Preseason Poll was announced at the 2014 American Athletic Conference Media Day in Newport, Rhode Island on July 29, 2014.

1. Cincinnati (17)
2. UCF (7)
3. Houston (6)
4. East Carolina
5. SMU
6. USF
7. Memphis
8. Temple
9. UConn
10. Tulane
11. Tulsa
- (first place votes)

== Head coaches ==
- Tommy Tuberville, Cincinnati
- Bob Diaco, Connecticut
- Ruffin McNeill, East Carolina
- Tony Levine, Houston
- Justin Fuente, Memphis
- June Jones, SMU
- Willie Taggart, South Florida
- Matt Rhule, Temple
- Curtis Johnson, Tulane
- Bill Blankenship, Tulsa
- George O'Leary, UCF

== Rankings ==
	Increase in ranking
	Decrease in ranking
	Not ranked previous week
	Selected for College Football Playoff
(Italics)	Number of first place votes
т	Tied with team above or below also with this symbol

		Pre	Wk 2	Wk 3	Wk 4	Wk 5	Wk 6	Wk 7	Wk 8	Wk 9	Wk 10	Wk 11	Wk 12	Wk 13	Wk 14	Wk 15	Wk 16	Final
Cincinnati	AP	RV	RV	RV	RV	RV										RV	RV	
Cincinnati	C	RV	RV	RV	RV		RV					RV	RV	RV	RV	RV	RV	
Cincinnati	CFP	Not released																
Connecticut	AP																	
Connecticut	C																	
Connecticut	CFP	Not released																
East Carolina	AP				RV	23	22	19	18	18	21							
East Carolina	C				RV	24	21	19	16	17	19	RV	RV					
East Carolina	CFP	Not released									23							
Houston	AP																	
Houston	C																	
Houston	CFP	Not released																
Memphis	AP															RV		25
Memphis	C	RV	RV	RV	RV	RV		RV							RV	RV		25
Memphis	CFP	Not released																
SMU	AP																	
SMU	C																	
SMU	CFP	Not released																
South Florida	AP																	
South Florida	C																	
South Florida	CFP	Not released																
Temple	AP																	
Temple	C	RV	RV															
Temple	CFP	Not released																
Tulane	AP																	
Tulane	C																	
Tulane	CFP	Not released																
Tulsa	AP																	
Tulsa	C																	
Tulsa	CFP	Not released																
UCF	AP	RV													RV	RV	RV	
UCF	C															RV	RV	
UCF	CFP	Not released																

== Schedule ==
Index to colors and formatting
American member won
American member lost
American teams in **bold**

Schedule source:

=== Week 1 ===
Date	Time	Visiting team	Home team	Site	TV	Result	Attendance	Ref.
August 28	9:15 p.m.	**Temple**	Vanderbilt	Vanderbilt Stadium • Nashville, Tennessee	SECN	**W** 37–7	31,731	
August 28	8:00 p.m.	**Tulane**	**Tulsa**	Skelly Field at H. A. Chapman Stadium • Tulsa, Oklahoma	CBSSN	**TULSA** 38–31 ^{2OT}	19,032	
August 29	8:00 p.m.	BYU	**Connecticut**	Rentschler Field • East Hartford, Connecticut	ESPN	**L** 35–10	35,130	
August 29	9:00 p.m.	UTSA	**Houston**	TDECU Stadium • Houston	ESPNU	**L** 27–7	40,775	
August 30	8:30 a.m.	Penn State	**UCF**	Croke Park • Dublin, Ireland (Croke Park Classic)	ESPN2	**L** **PSU** 26–24	50,304	
August 30	8:00 p.m.	NC Central	**East Carolina**	Dowdy–Ficklen Stadium • Greenville, North Carolina	ESPNews	**W** 52–7	42,758	
August 30	7:00 p.m.	Austin Peay	**Memphis**	Liberty Bowl Memorial Stadium • Memphis, Tennessee	ESPN3	**W** 63–0	27,361	
August 30	7:00 p.m.	Western Carolina	**South Florida**	Raymond James Stadium • Tampa, Florida	ESPN3	**W** 36–31	31,642	
August 31	8:30 p.m.	**SMU**	No. 10 Baylor	McLane Stadium • Waco, Texas	FS1	**L** 45–0	45,733	
^{#}Rankings from AP Poll released prior to game. All times are in Eastern Time.

Bye Week: Cincinnati

=== Week 2 ===
Date	Time	Visiting team	Home team	Site	TV	Result	Attendance	Ref.
September 6	12:00 p.m.	Stony Brook	**Connecticut**	Rentschler Field • East Hartford, Connecticut	SNY	**W** 19–16	23,543	
September 6	7:00 p.m.	**East Carolina**	No. 21 South Carolina	Williams-Brice Stadium • Columbia, South Carolina	ESPNU	**L** 33–23	80,899	
September 6	8:00 p.m.	Grambling	**Houston**	TDECU Stadium • Houston	ESPN3	**W** 47–0	30,081	
September 6	10:00 p.m.	**Memphis**	No. 11 UCLA	Rose Bowl (stadium) • Pasadena, California	Pac-12 Network	**L** 42–35	72,098	
September 6	12:00 p.m.	**SMU**	North Texas	Apogee Stadium • Denton, Texas	FSN	**L** 43–6	22,398	
September 6	3:30 p.m.	Maryland	**South Florida**	Raymond James Stadium • Tampa, Florida	CBSSN	**L** 24–17	28,915	
September 6	1:00 p.m.	Navy	**Temple**	Lincoln Financial Field • Philadelphia	ESPN3	**L** 34–21	28,408	
September 6	4:00 p.m.	Georgia Tech	**Tulane**	Yulman Stadium • New Orleans	ESPNews	**L** 38–21	30,000	
September 6	12:00 p.m.	No. 4 Oklahoma	**Tulsa**	Skelly Field at H. A. Chapman Stadium • Tulsa, Oklahoma	ABC/ESPN2	**L** 52–7	29,357	
^{#}Rankings from AP Poll released prior to game. All times are in Eastern Time.

Bye Week: Cincinnati, UCF

=== Week 3 ===
Date	Time	Visiting team	Home team	Site	TV	Result	Attendance	Ref.
September 11	9:00 p.m.	**Houston**	No. 25 BYU	LaVell Edwards Stadium • Provo, Utah	ESPN	**L** 35–23	57,630	
September 12	7:00 p.m.	Toledo	**Cincinnati**	Paul Brown Stadium • Cincinnati	ESPNU	**W** 58–34	31,912	
September 13	12:00 p.m.	**UCF**	No. 20 Missouri	Faurot Field • Columbia, Missouri	SECN	**L** **MIZ** 38–10	60,348	
September 13	12:00 p.m.	Boise State	**Connecticut**	Rentschler Field • East Hartford, Connecticut	ABC/ESPN2	**L** **BSU** 38–21	30,098	
September 13	12:00 p.m.	**East Carolina**	No. 17 Virginia Tech	Lane Stadium • Blacksburg	ESPN	**W** **ECU** 28–21	63,267	
September 13	3:30 p.m.	NC State	**South Florida**	Raymond James Stadium • Tampa, Florida	CBSSN	**L** **USF** 49–17	27,269	
September 13	8:00 p.m.	SE Louisiana	**Tulane**	Yulman Stadium • New Orleans	ESPN3	**W** **TUL** 35–20	26,358	
September 13	7:00 p.m.	**Tulsa**	Florida Atlantic	FAU Stadium • Boca Raton, Florida	FCS	**L** 50–21	14,112	
^{#}Rankings from AP Poll released prior to game. All times are in Eastern Time.

Bye Week: Memphis, SMU, Temple

=== Week 4 ===
Date	Time	Visiting team	Home team	Site	TV	Result	Attendance	Ref.
September 19	8:00 p.m.	**Connecticut**	**South Florida**	Raymond James Stadium • Tampa, Florida	ESPN	**USF** 17–14	28,723	
September 20	6:00 p.m.	Bethune–Cookman	**UCF**	Bright House Networks Stadium • Orlando, Florida	ESPN3	**W** **UCF** 41–7	44,510	
September 20	7:00 p.m.	Miami (OH)	**Cincinnati**	Paul Brown Stadium • Cincinnati	CBSSN	**W** 31–24	41,926	
September 20	3:30 p.m.	North Carolina	**East Carolina**	Dowdy–Ficklen Stadium • Greenville, North Carolina	ESPNU	**W** **ECU** 70–41	51,082	
September 20	8:00 p.m.	UNLV	**Houston**	TDECU Stadium • Houston	ESPN3	**W** 47–14	23,408	
September 20	7:00 p.m.	Middle Tennessee	**Memphis**	Liberty Bowl Memorial Stadium • Memphis, Tennessee	ESPN3	**W** 36–17	46,378	
September 20	3:30 p.m.	No. 6 Texas A&M	**SMU**	Gerald J. Ford Stadium • Dallas	ABC/ESPN2	**L** 58–6	34,820	
September 20	1:00 p.m.	Delaware State	**Temple**	Lincoln Financial Field • Philadelphia	ESPN3	**W** 59–0	19,202	
September 20	12:30 p.m.	**Tulane**	Duke	Wallace Wade Stadium • Durham, North Carolina	ACC RSN	**L** 47–13	20,197	
^{#}Rankings from AP Poll released prior to game. All times are in Eastern Time.

Bye Week: Tulsa

=== Week 5 ===
Date	Time	Visiting team	Home team	Site	TV	Result	Attendance	Ref.
September 27	6:00 p.m.	**Cincinnati**	No. 22 Ohio State	Ohio Stadium • Columbus, Ohio	BTN	**L** 58–20	108,362	
September 27	4:00 p.m.	**Temple**	**Connecticut**	Rentschler Field • East Hartford, Connecticut	ESPNews	**TEMP** 36–10	27,755	
September 27	6:30 p.m.	**Memphis**	No. 10 Ole Miss	Vaught–Hemingway Stadium • Oxford, Mississippi	FSN	**L** 24–3	61,291	
September 27	12:00 p.m.	TCU	**SMU**	Gerald J. Ford Stadium • Dallas	CBSSN	**L** 56–0	23,093	
September 27	12:00 p.m.	**South Florida**	No. 19 Wisconsin	Camp Randall Stadium • Madison, Wisconsin	ESPNU	**L** 27–10	78,111	
September 27	12:00 p.m.	**Tulane**	Rutgers	High Point Solutions Stadium • Piscataway, New Jersey	ESPNews	**L** 31–6	48,361	
September 27	8:00 p.m.	Texas State	**Tulsa**	Skelly Field at H. A. Chapman Stadium • Tulsa, Oklahoma	ESPNEWS	**L** 37–34 ^{3OT}	21,353	
^{#}Rankings from AP Poll released prior to game. All times are in Eastern Time.

Bye Week: East Carolina, Houston, UCF

=== Week 6 ===
Date	Time	Visiting team	Home team	Site	TV	Result	Attendance	Ref.
October 2	7:00 p.m.	**UCF**	**Houston**	TDECU Stadium • Houston	ESPN	**UCF** 17–12	26,685	
October 4	7:00 p.m.	**Memphis**	**Cincinnati**	Paul Brown Stadium • Cincinnati	CBSSN	**MEM** 41–14	25,456	
October 4	12:00 p.m.	**SMU**	No. 22 **East Carolina**	Dowdy–Ficklen Stadium • Greenville, North Carolina	ESPNU	**ECU** 45–24	45,029	
October 4	3:00 p.m.	**Tulsa**	Colorado State	Hughes Stadium • Fort Collins, Colorado	MWN	**L** 42–17	25,806	
^{#}Rankings from AP Poll released prior to game. All times are in Eastern Time.

Bye Week: Connecticut, South Florida, Temple, Tulane

=== Week 7 ===
Date	Time	Visiting team	Home team	Site	TV	Result	Attendance	Ref.
October 9	7:30 p.m.	BYU	**UCF**	Bright House Networks Stadium • Orlando, Florida	ESPN	**W** **UCF** 31–24 ^{OT}	41,547	
October 11	12:00 p.m.	**Cincinnati**	Miami (FL)	Sun Life Stadium • Miami Gardens, Florida	ACCRSN	**L** 55–24	43,953	
October 11	8:00 p.m.	**Connecticut**	**Tulane**	Yulman Stadium • New Orleans	ESPNews	**TULN** 12–3	23,076	
October 11	7:00 p.m.	No. 19 **East Carolina**	**South Florida**	Raymond James Stadium • Tampa, Florida	ESPNU	**ECU** 28–17	31,567	
October 11	6:00 p.m.	**Houston**	**Memphis**	Liberty Bowl Memorial Stadium • Memphis, Tennessee	CBSSN	**HOU** 28–24	32,784	
October 11	12:00 p.m.	**Tulsa**	**Temple**	Lincoln Financial Field • Philadelphia	ESPNews	**TEMP** 35–24	25,340	
^{#}Rankings from AP Poll released prior to game. All times are in Eastern Time.

Bye Week: SMU

=== Week 8 ===
Date	Time	Visiting team	Home team	Site	TV	Result	Attendance	Ref.
October 17	9:00 p.m.	**Temple**	**Houston**	TDECU Stadium • Houston	ESPNU	**HOU** 31–10	21,471	
October 18	12:00 p.m.	**Tulane**	**UCF**	Bright House Networks Stadium • Orlando, Florida	ESPNU	**UCF** 20–13	35,015	
October 18	3:30 p.m.	**Cincinnati**	**SMU**	Gerald J. Ford Stadium • Dallas	CBSSN	**CIN** 41–3	16,849	
October 18	12:00 p.m.	**USF**	**Tulsa**	Skelly Field at H. A. Chapman Stadium • Tulsa, Oklahoma	ESPNews	**USF** 38–30	18,744	
^{#}Rankings from AP Poll released prior to game. All times are in Eastern Time.

Bye Week: Connecticut, East Carolina, Memphis

=== Week 9 ===
Date	Time	Visiting team	Home team	Site	TV	Result	Attendance	Ref.
October 23	7:00 p.m.	**Connecticut**	No. 18 **East Carolina**	Dowdy–Ficklen Stadium • Greenville, North Carolina	ESPNU	**ECU** 31–21	40,152	
October 24	7:00 p.m.	**South Florida**	**Cincinnati**	Paul Brown Stadium • Cincinnati	ESPN2	**CIN** 34–17	30,024	
October 25	5:00 p.m.	**Temple**	**UCF**	Bright House Networks Stadium • Orlando, Florida	CBSSN	**UCF** 34–14	39,554	
October 25	12:00 p.m.	**Memphis**	**SMU**	Gerald J. Ford Stadium • Dallas	ESPNews	**MEM** 48–10	19,498	
^{#}Rankings from AP Poll released prior to game. All times are in Eastern Time.

Bye Week: Houston, Tulane, Tulsa

=== Week 10 ===
Date	Time	Visiting team	Home team	Site	TV	Result	Attendance	Ref.
October 31	8:00 p.m.	**Cincinnati**	**Tulane**	Yulman Stadium • New Orleans	ESPN2	**CIN** 38–14	21,414	
October 31	8:00 p.m.	**Tulsa**	**Memphis**	Liberty Bowl Memorial Stadium • Memphis, Tennessee	ESPNU	**MEM** 40–20	26,846	
November 1	12:00 p.m.	**UCF**	**Connecticut**	Rentschler Field • East Hartford, Connecticut	CBSSN	**CONN** 37–29	28,751	
November 1	12:00 p.m.	No. 21 **East Carolina**	**Temple**	Lincoln Financial Field • Philadelphia	ESPNews	**TEMP** 20–10	22,130	
November 1	4:00 p.m.	**Houston**	**South Florida**	Raymond James Stadium • Tampa, Florida	ESPNews	**HOU** 27–3	29,782	
^{#}Rankings from AP Poll released prior to game. All times are in Eastern Time.

Bye Week: SMU

=== Week 11 ===
Date	Time	Visiting team	Home team	Site	TV	Result	Attendance	Ref.
November 7	7:30 p.m.	**Memphis**	**Temple**	Lincoln Financial Field • Philadelphia, Pennsylvania	ESPNU	**MEM** 16–13	23,882	
November 8	3:30 p.m.	**Connecticut**	Army	Yankee Stadium • Bronx, New York	CBSSN	**L** 35–21	27,453	
November 8	3:30 p.m.	**Tulane**	**Houston**	TDECU Stadium • Houston	ESPNU	**TULN** 31–24	32,205	
November 8	12:00 p.m.	**SMU**	**Tulsa**	Skelly Field at H. A. Chapman Stadium • Tulsa, Oklahoma	CBSSN	**TULSA** 38–28	14,269	
^{#}Rankings from AP Poll released prior to game. All times are in Eastern Time.

Bye Week: Cincinnati, East Carolina, South Florida, UCF

=== Week 12 ===
Date	Time	Visiting team	Home team	Site	TV	Result	Attendance	Ref.
November 13	7:00 p.m.	**East Carolina**	**Cincinnati**	Paul Brown Stadium • Cincinnati, Ohio	ESPN2	**CIN** 54–46	19,113	
November 14	8:00 p.m.	**Tulsa**	**UCF**	Bright House Networks Stadium • Orlando, Florida	ESPN2	**UCF** 31–7	35,323	
November 15	3:30 p.m.	**Memphis**	**Tulane**	Yulman Stadium • New Orleans	ESPNU	**MEM** 38–7	28,614	
November 15	8:00 p.m.	**South Florida**	**SMU**	Gerald J. Ford Stadium • Dallas	CBSSN	**USF** 14–13	19,463	
November 15	12:00 p.m.	**Temple**	Penn State	Beaver Stadium • University Park, Pennsylvania	ESPN2	**L** PSU 31–13	100,173	
^{#}Rankings from AP Poll released prior to game. All times are in Eastern Time.

Bye Week: Houston, Connecticut

=== Week 13 ===
Date	Time	Visiting team	Home team	Site	TV	Result	Attendance	Ref.
November 22	12:00 p.m.	**SMU**	**UCF**	Bright House Networks Stadium • Orlando, Florida	ESPNews	**UCF** 53–7	30,920	
November 22	8:00 p.m.	**Cincinnati**	**Connecticut**	Rentschler Field • East Hartford, Connecticut	CBSSN	**CIN** 41–0	24,012	
November 22	3:30 p.m.	**Tulane**	**East Carolina**	Dowdy–Ficklen Stadium • Greenville, North Carolina	ESPN3	**ECU** 34–6	48,433	
November 22	12:00 p.m.	**Tulsa**	**Houston**	TDECU Stadium • Houston	ESPN3	**HOU** 38–28	23,572	
November 22	4:00 p.m.	**South Florida**	**Memphis**	Liberty Bowl Memorial Stadium • Memphis, Tennessee	ESPNews	**MEM** 31–20	34,635	
^{#}Rankings from AP Poll released prior to game. All times are in Eastern Time.

Bye Week: Temple

=== Week 14 ===
Date	Time	Visiting team	Home team	Site	TV	Result	Attendance	Ref.
November 28	12:00 p.m.	**UCF**	**South Florida**	Raymond James Stadium • Tampa, Florida (rivalry)	ESPN2	**UCF** 16–0	36,963	
November 28	7:30 p.m.	**East Carolina**	**Tulsa**	Skelly Field at H. A. Chapman Stadium • Tulsa, Oklahoma	ESPNU	**ECU** 49–32	15,126	
November 28	12:00 p.m.	**Houston**	**SMU**	Gerald J. Ford Stadium • Dallas (rivalry)	CBSSN	**HOU** 35–9	15,446	
November 29	12:00 p.m.	**Cincinnati**	**Temple**	Lincoln Financial Field • Philadelphia	ESPNews	**CIN** 14–6	21,255	
November 29	4:00 p.m.	**Connecticut**	**Memphis**	Liberty Bowl Memorial Stadium • Memphis, Tennessee	ESPNews	**MEM** 41–10	35,102	
^{#}Rankings from AP Poll released prior to game. All times are in Eastern Time.

Bye Week: Tulane

=== Week 15 ===
Date	Time	Visiting team	Home team	Site	TV	Result	Attendance	Ref.
December 4	7:30 p.m.	**UCF**	**East Carolina**	Dowdy–Ficklen Stadium • Greenville, North Carolina (rivalry)	ESPN	**UCF** 32–30	41,259	
December 6	12:00 p.m.	**Houston**	**Cincinnati**	Paul Brown Stadium • Cincinnati	ESPN	**CIN** 38–31	24,606	
December 6	12:00 p.m.	**SMU**	**Connecticut**	Rentschler Field • East Hartford, Connecticut	CBSSN	**SMU** 27–20	22,921	
December 6	7:30 p.m.	**Temple**	**Tulane**	Yulman Stadium • New Orleans	ESPN2	**TEM** 10–3	20,612	
^{#}Rankings from AP Poll released prior to game. All times are in Eastern Time.

Bye Week: Memphis, South Florida, Tulsa

== Bowl games ==
Date	Time	Visiting team	Home team	Site	TV	Result	Attendance	Ref.
December 22*	2:00 p.m.	BYU	Memphis	Marlins Park • Miami (2014 Miami Beach Bowl)	ESPN	W 55–48 ^{2OT}	20,761	
December 26*	8:00 p.m.	NC State	UCF	St. Petersburg, Florida (Bitcoin St. Petersburg Bowl)	ESPN	L 27–34	26,675	
December 27*	1:00 p.m.	Cincinnati	Virginia Tech	Navy–Marine Corps Memorial Stadium • Annapolis, Maryland (Military Bowl presented by Northrop Grumman)	ESPN	L 17–33	34,277	
January 1*	12:00 p.m.	Houston	Pittsburgh	Amon G. Carter Stadium • Fort Worth, Texas (Lockheed Martin Armed Forces Bowl)	ESPN	W 35–34	37,888	
January 3*	1:00 p.m.	East Carolina	Florida	Legion Field • Birmingham, Alabama (Birmingham Bowl)	ESPN2	L 20–28		
^{#}Rankings from AP Poll released prior to game. All times are in Eastern Time.

=== Bowl eligibility ===
==== Bowl eligible ====
- Memphis (9–3)
- Cincinnati (9–3)
- UCF (9–3)
- East Carolina (8–4)
- Houston (7–5)
- Temple (6–6)

==== Bowl ineligible ====
- South Florida (3–8)
- Tulsa (2–10)
- Tulane (3–9)
- SMU (1–11)
- Connecticut (2–10)

== Records against other conferences ==
=== American vs. power conferences ===
Legend
American win
American loss

Date	Visitor	Home	Winning team	Opponent Conference
August 28	Temple	Vanderbilt	Temple	SEC
August 30	Penn State	UCF	Penn State	Big Ten
August 31	SMU	Baylor	Baylor	Big 12
September 6	Maryland	South Florida	Maryland	Big Ten
September 6	Memphis	UCLA	UCLA	Pac 12
September 6	East Carolina	South Carolina	South Carolina	SEC
September 6	Georgia Tech	Tulane	Georgia Tech	ACC
September 6	Oklahoma	Tulsa	Oklahoma	Big 12
September 13	UCF	Missouri	Missouri	SEC
September 13	East Carolina	Virginia Tech	East Carolina	ACC
September 13	North Carolina State	South Florida	North Carolina State	ACC
September 20	Texas A&M	SMU	Texas A&M	SEC
September 20	North Carolina	East Carolina	East Carolina	ACC
September 20	Tulane	Duke	Duke	ACC
September 27	Tulane	Rutgers	Rutgers	Big Ten
September 27	Memphis	Ole Miss	Ole Miss	SEC
September 27	TCU	SMU	TCU	Big 12
September 27	South Florida	Wisconsin	Wisconsin	Big Ten
September 27	Cincinnati	Ohio State	Ohio State	Big Ten
October 11	Cincinnati	Miami (FL)	Miami (FL)	ACC
November 15	Temple	Penn State	Penn State	Big Ten

=== American vs. FBS conferences ===
Conference	Record
ACC	2–4
Big 12	0–3
Big Ten	0–6
C-USA	1–3
Independents	1–4
MAC	2–0
Mountain West	1–2
Pac-12	0–1
SEC	1–4
Sun Belt	0–1
Total	8–28

== Players of the week ==
Week	Offensive			Defensive			Special teams		
Week	Player	Team	Position	Player	Team	Position	Player	Team	Position
Week 1	Kevin Lucas	Tulsa	WR	Tavon Young	Temple	CB	Marvin Kloss	South Florida	PK
Week 2	Paxton Lynch	Memphis	QB	Nigel Harris	South Florida	LB	Deshon Foxx	Connecticut	PR
Week 3	Gunner Kiel	Cincinnati	QB	Josh Hawkins	East Carolina	LB	Sam Geraci	Cincinnati	P
Week 4	Shane Carden	East Carolina	QB	Tank Jakes	Memphis	LB	Mattias Ciabatti	South Florida	P
Week 5	Chris Moore	Cincinnati	WR	Praise Martin-Oguike	Temple	DE	Austin Jones	Temple	PK
Week 6	Shane Carden	East Carolina	QB	Tank Jakes	Memphis	LB	Kyle Bullard	Houston	PK
Week 7	Justin Holman	UCF	QB	Terrance Plummer	UCF	LB	J.J. Worton	UCF	PR
Week 8	André Davis	South Florida	WR	Steven Taylor	Houston	LB	Andrew Gantz	Cincinnati	PK
Week 9	Shane Carden	East Carolina	QB	Jacoby Glenn	UCF	CB	Andrew Gantz	Cincinnati	PK
Week 10	Brandon Hayes	Memphis	RB	Praise Martin-Oguike	Temple	DE	Jake Elliott	Memphis	PK
Week 11	Dane Evans	Tulsa	QB	Parry Nickerson	Tulane	CB	Jake Elliott	Memphis	PK
Week 12	Gunner Kiel	Cincinnati	QB	Jacoby Glenn	UCF	CB	Andrew Gantz	Cincinnati	PK
Week 13	Kenneth Farrow	Houston	RB	Jeff Luc	Cincinnati	LB	Michael Easton	UCF	KR
Week 14	Paxton Lynch	Memphis	QB	Nick Temple	Cincinnati	LB	Jake Elliott	Memphis	PK
Week 15	Breshad Perriman	UCF	WR	Tyler Matakevich	Temple	LB	Shawn Moffitt	UCF	PK

=== Position key ===
Center	C	Cornerback	CB	Defensive back	DB	Defensive end	DE
Defensive lineman	DL	Defensive tackle	DT	Guard	G	Kickoff returner	KR
Offensive tackle	OT	Offensive lineman	OL	Linebacker	LB	Long snapper	LS
Punter	P	Placekicker	PK	Punt returner	PR	Quarterback	QB
Running back	RB	Safety	S	Tight end	TE	Wide receiver	WR

== Awards and honors ==
=== Conference awards ===
The following individuals received postseason honors as voted by the American Athletic Conference football coaches at the end of the season

2014 American Athletic Conference Individual Awards
Award	Recipient(s)
Offensive Player of the Year	Shane Carden, East Carolina
Defensive Player of the Year	Jacoby Glenn, UCF; Tank Jakes, Memphis
Special Teams Player of the Year	Jake Elliott, Memphis
Rookie of the Year	Marlon Mack, USF
Coach of the Year	Justin Fuente, Memphis

2014 All-American Athletic Conference Football Teams
First Team		Second Team	
Offense	Defense	Offense	Defense
WR – Breshad Perriman, UCF; WR – Justin Hardy, East Carolina; OT – Eric Lefeld^{^}, Cincinnati; OT – Al Bond, Memphis; OG – Parker Ehinger, Cincinnati; OG – Rowdy Harper, Houston; C – Taylor Hudson, East Carolina; TE – Alan Cross, Memphis; QB – Shane Carden, East Carolina; RB – William Stanback, UCF; RB – Marlon Mack, USF; K – Jake Elliott, Memphis; RS – Deion Sanders Jr., SMU	DL – Terrell Hartsfield, Cincinnati; DL – Terry Williams, East Carolina; DL – Joey Mbu, Houston; DL – Martin Ifedi, Memphis; LB – Terrance Plummer, UCF; LB – Jeff Luc, Cincinnati; LB – Tank Jakes, Memphis; LB – Tyler Matakevich, Temple; CB – Jacoby Glenn, UCF; CB – Bobby McCain, Memphis; S – Clayton Geathers, UCF; S – Adrian McDonald, Houston; P – Mattias Ciabatti, USF	WR – Deontay Greenberry, Houston; WR – Keevan Lucas, Tulsa; OT – Torrian Wilson, UCF; OT – Ike Harris, East Carolina; OG – J.T. Boyd, East Carolina; C – Kyle Friend, Temple; TE – Bryce Williams, East Carolina; QB – Paxton Lynch, Memphis; RB – Kenneth Farrow, Houston; RB – Brandon Hayes, Memphis; K – Andrew Gantz, Cincinnati; RS – Keiwone Malone, Memphis	DL – Jaryl Mamea, UCF; DL – Thomas Niles, UCF; DL – Matt Ioaniddis, Temple; DL – Praise Martin-Oguike, Temple; DL – Derrick Alexander, Tulsa; LB – Zeek Bigger, East Carolina; LB – Brandon Williams, East Carolina; LB – Efrem Oliphant, Houston; CB – William Jackson, Houston; CB – Lorenzo Doss, Tulane; CB – Brandon Alexander, UCF; S – Sam Scofield, Tulane; P – Spencer Smith, Memphis
^{^} - denotes unanimous selection Additional players added to the All-AAC teams due to ties in the voting

== Home game attendance ==
as of December 6, 2014.

Team	Stadium	Capacity	Gm 1	Gm 2	Gm 3	Gm 4	Gm 5	Gm 6	Gm 7	Total	Average	% of Capacity
Cincinnati	Paul Brown Stadium^{*}	65,535	31,912	41,926	25,456	30,024	19,113	24,606		173,037	28,839	44.01%
Connecticut	Rentschler Field	40,000	35,130	23,543	30,098	27,755	28,751	24,012		169,309	28,218	70.55%
East Carolina	Dowdy–Ficklen Stadium	50,000	42,758	51,082	45,029	40,152	48,433	41,259		268,713	44,786	89.57%
Houston	TDECU Stadium	40,000	40,775	30,081	23,408	26,685	21,471	32,205	23,572	198,177	28,311	70.78%
Memphis	Liberty Bowl Memorial Stadium	61,008	27,361	46,378	32,784	26,846	34,635	35,102		203,106	33,851	57.08%
SMU	Gerald J. Ford Stadium	32,000	34,820	23,093	16,849	19,498	19,463	15,446		129,169	21,528	67.28%
South Florida	Raymond James Stadium	65,890	31,642	28,915	27,269	28,273	31,567	29,782	36,963	214,861	30,694	46.61%
Temple	Lincoln Financial Field	68,532	28,408	19,202	25,340	22,130	23,882	21,255		140,217	23,370	34.10%
Tulane	Yulman Stadium	30,000	30,000	26,358	23,076	21,414	28,614	20,612		129,462	25,892	86.31%
Tulsa	Skelly Field at H. A. Chapman Stadium	30,000	19,032	29,357	21,353	18,744	14,269	15,126		117,881	19,647	65.49%
UCF	Bright House Networks Stadium	45,323	44,510	41,547	35,015	39,554	35,323	30,920		226,869	37,812	83.43%

^* Cincinnati will be playing all its 2014 Paul Brown Stadium due to ongoing renovations to Nippert Stadium, capacity: 65,535.
Games highlighted in green were sell-outs.
