= 2014 East Carolina Pirates football team =

American college football season

2014 East Carolina Pirates football

Birmingham Bowl, L 20–28 vs. Florida
- Conference: American Athletic Conference
- Record: 8–5 (5–3 The American)
- Head coach: Ruffin McNeill (5th season)
- Offensive coordinator: Lincoln Riley (5th season)
- Offensive scheme: Air raid
- Defensive coordinator: Rick Smith (2nd season)
- Base defense: 4–3
- Home stadium: Dowdy–Ficklen Stadium

2014 American Athletic Conference football standings
	Conf.			Overall
Team	W		L	W		L
No. 25 Memphis +	7	–	1	10	–	3
Cincinnati +	7	–	1	9	–	4
UCF +	7	–	1	9	–	4
East Carolina	5	–	3	8	–	5
Houston	5	–	3	8	–	5
Temple	4	–	4	6	–	6
South Florida	3	–	5	4	–	8
Tulane	2	–	6	3	–	9
Tulsa	2	–	6	2	–	10
UConn	1	–	7	2	–	10
SMU	1	–	7	1	–	11
+ – Conference co-champions; Rankings from AP Poll

The 2014 East Carolina Pirates football team represented East Carolina University in the 2014 NCAA Division I FBS football season. They were led by fifth-year head coach Ruffin McNeill and played their home games at Dowdy–Ficklen Stadium. This was East Carolina's first season as part of the American Athletic Conference. They finished the season 8–5, 5–3 in AAC play to finish in a tie for fourth place. They were invited to the Birmingham Bowl where they lost to Florida.

== Schedule ==
Date	Time	Opponent	Rank	Site	TV	Result	Attendance
August 30	8:00 pm	North Carolina Central*		Dowdy–Ficklen Stadium; Greenville, NC	ESPNews	W 52–7	42,758
September 6	7:00 pm	at No. 21 South Carolina*		Williams-Brice Stadium; Columbia, SC	ESPNU	L 23–33	80,899
September 13	12:00 pm	at No. 17 Virginia Tech*		Lane Stadium; Blacksburg, VA	ESPN	W 28–21	63,267
September 20	3:30 pm	North Carolina*		Dowdy–Ficklen Stadium; Greenville, NC	ESPNU	W 70–41	51,082
October 4	12:00 pm	SMU^{†}	No. 22	Dowdy–Ficklen Stadium; Greenville, NC	ESPNU	W 45–24	45,029
October 11	7:00 pm	at South Florida	No. 19	Raymond James Stadium; Tampa, FL	ESPNU	W 28–17	31,567
October 23	7:00 pm	UConn	No. 18	Dowdy–Ficklen Stadium; Greenville, NC	ESPNU	W 31–21	40,152
November 1	12:00 pm	at Temple	No. 23	Lincoln Financial Field; Philadelphia, PA	ESPNews	L 10–20	22,130
November 13	7:00 pm	at Cincinnati		Paul Brown Stadium; Cincinnati, OH	ESPN2	L 46–54	19,113
November 22	3:30 pm	Tulane		Dowdy–Ficklen Stadium; Greenville, NC	ESPN3	W 34–6	48,433
November 28	8:30 pm	at Tulsa		Chapman Stadium; Tulsa, OK	ESPNU	W 49–32	15,126
December 4	7:30 pm	UCF		Dowdy–Ficklen Stadium; Greenville, NC	ESPN	L 30–32	41,259
January 3, 2015	12:00 pm	vs. Florida*		Legion Field; Birmingham, AL (Birmingham Bowl)	ESPN2	L 20–28	30,083
*Non-conference game; ^{†}Homecoming; Rankings from AP Poll (and CFP Rankings, after October 28) - Released prior to game; All times are in Eastern time

Schedule source:

== Game summaries ==
=== North Carolina Central ===
	1	2	3	4	Total
Eagles	7	0	0	0	7
Pirates	10	21	7	14	52

=== South Carolina ===
	1	2	3	4	Total
Pirates	6	10	0	7	23
#21 Gamecocks	7	13	10	3	33

=== Virginia Tech ===
	1	2	3	4	Total
Pirates	21	0	0	7	28
#17 Hokies	0	7	0	14	21

=== North Carolina ===
	1	2	3	4	Total
Tar Heels	13	7	7	14	41
Pirates	14	21	21	14	70

=== SMU ===
	1	2	3	4	Total
Mustangs	0	7	17	0	24
#22 Pirates	14	14	7	10	45

=== South Florida ===
	1	2	3	4	Total
#19 Pirates	7	0	7	14	28
Bulls	7	10	0	0	17

=== UConn ===
	1	2	3	4	Total
Huskies	7	0	14	0	21
#18 Pirates	14	0	7	10	31

=== Temple ===
	1	2	3	4	Total
#21 Pirates	0	3	0	7	10
Owls	14	0	6	0	20

=== Cincinnati ===
	1	2	3	4	Total
Pirates	6	14	7	19	46
Bearcats	14	17	7	16	54

=== Tulane ===
	1	2	3	4	Total
Green Wave	0	3	0	0	3
Pirates	10	7	3	14	34

=== Tulsa ===
	1	2	3	4	Total
Pirates	14	7	14	14	49
Golden Hurricane	14	0	11	7	32

=== Central Florida ===
	1	2	3	4	Total
Knights	6	17	3	6	32
Pirates	6	3	0	21	30

=== Birmingham Bowl ===
	1	2	3	4	Total
Pirates	7	0	10	3	20
Gators	7	14	7	0	28

== Rankings ==
Ranking movements Legend: ██ Increase in ranking ██ Decrease in ranking — = Not ranked RV = Received votes
	Week																
Poll	Pre	1	2	3	4	5	6	7	8	9	10	11	12	13	14	15	Final
AP	—	—	—	RV	23	22	19	18	18	21	—	—	—	—	—	—	—
Coaches	—	—	—	RV	24	21	19	16	17	19	RV	RV	—	—	—	—	—
CFP	Not released									23	—	—	—	—	—	—	Not released
