= William Stanback =

American gridiron football player (born 1994)

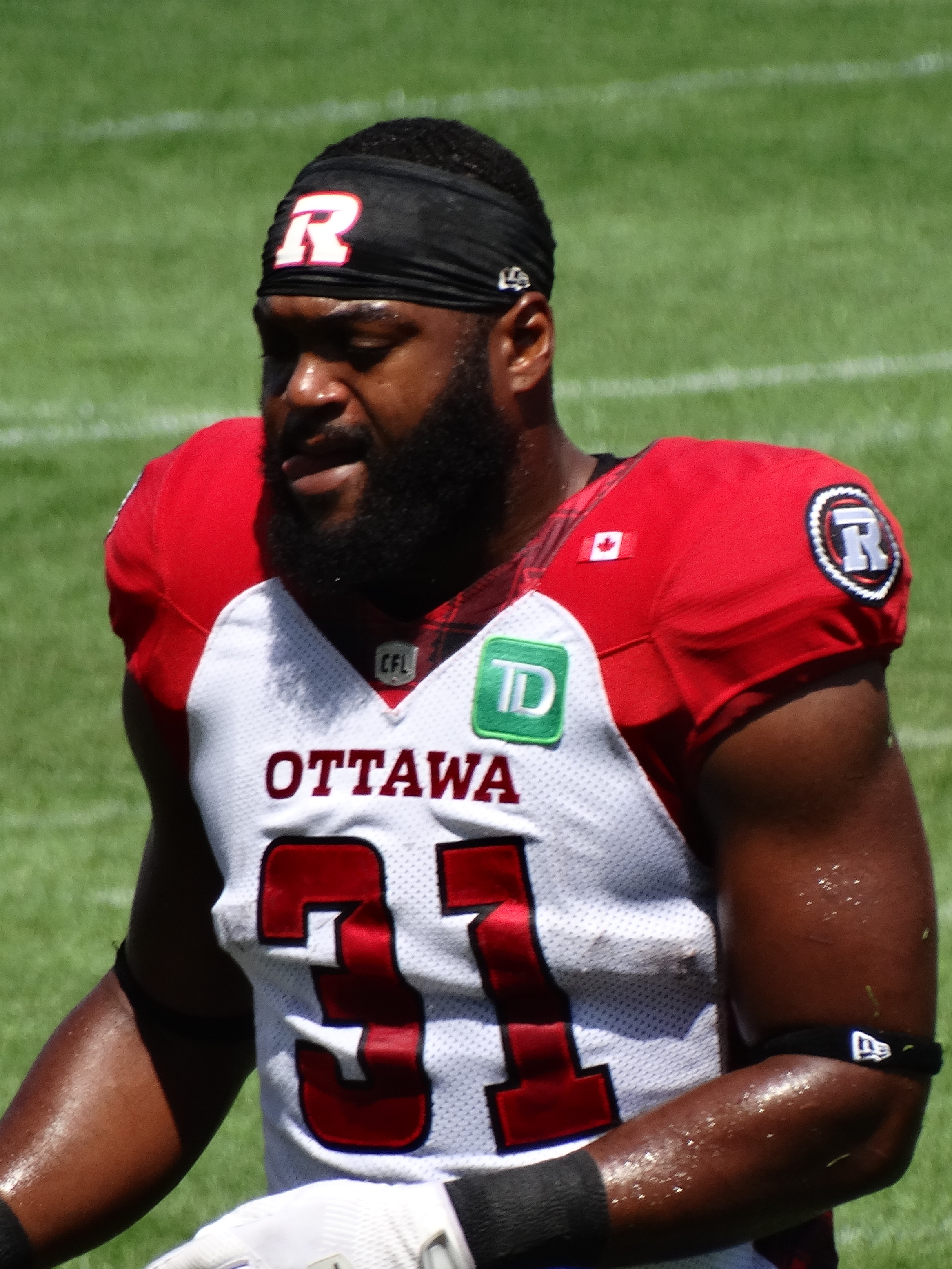
- Stanback with the Ottawa Redblacks in 2025

Profile
- Position: Running back

Personal information
- Born: July 6, 1994 (age 32); Hempstead, New York, U.S.
- Listed height: 6 ft 0 in (1.83 m)
- Listed weight: 233 lb (106 kg)

Career information
- High school: Uniondale (Uniondale, New York)
- College: UCF (2013–2015); Virginia Union (2016)
- NFL draft: 2017: undrafted

Career history
- Green Bay Packers (2017)*; Montreal Alouettes (2018–2019); Las Vegas Raiders (2020)*; Montreal Alouettes (2021–2023); BC Lions (2024); Ottawa Redblacks (2025)
- * Offseason or practice squad member only

Awards and highlights
- Grey Cup champion (2023); Terry Evanshen Trophy (2021); 2× CFL All-Star (2019, 2021); 2× CFL East All-Star (2019, 2021); CFL rushing yards leader (2021); First-team All-AAC (2014); Second-team All-AAC (2013)

Career CFL statistics as of 2025
- Rushing attempts: 1,003
- Rushing yards: 5,589
- Rushing touchdowns: 18
- Receptions: 189
- Receiving yards: 1,749
- Stats at CFL.ca
- Stats at Pro Football Reference

William Stanback (born July 6, 1994) is an American professional football running back. He most recently played with the Ottawa Redblacks of the Canadian Football League (CFL). He played college football at Virginia Union and UCF. He has also been a member of the Green Bay Packers and Las Vegas Raiders of the National Football League (NFL), and the Montreal Alouettes of the CFL.

== College career ==
=== UCF ===
Stanback began his college football career at UCF. In 2013, during a game against Rutgers, Stanback delivered a hit to Rutgers defensive back Anthony Cioffi that went viral and made that night's SportsCenter Top 10 plays. In 2014, Stanback was named to the All-American Athletic Conference First-team. On September 22, 2015, Stanback was dismissed from UCF after reportedly failing multiple marijuana tests.

=== Virginia Union ===
Stanback then played for Virginia Union. In 2016, he rushed for 1,299 yards and was named to the All-CIAA First Team.

== Professional career ==
Pre-draft measurables
Height	Weight	Arm length	Hand span	40-yard dash	10-yard split	20-yard split	20-yard shuttle	Three-cone drill	Vertical jump	Broad jump	Bench press
5 ft 11 3/4 in (1.82 m)	233 lb (106 kg)	32 1/4 in (0.82 m)	9 1/8 in (0.23 m)	4.55 s	1.63 s	2.77 s	4.59 s	6.90 s	34.0 in (0.86 m)	10 ft 2 in (3.10 m)	23 reps
All values from Pro Day

=== Green Bay Packers ===
Stanback signed with the Green Bay Packers in May 2017. He was released by the Packers on August 28, 2017.

=== Montreal Alouettes (first stint) ===
Stanback signed with the Montreal Alouettes of the Canadian Football League (CFL) in May 2018. He started receiving significant playing time in August 2018, and a month later the Alouettes traded Tyrell Sutton to the BC Lions; moving Stanback into the starting running back role. Stanback finished his rookie season having played in 16 games, carrying the ball 81 times for 539 yards – he also caught 25 passes for 313 yards with two touchdowns. On special teams, Stanback also made 8 tackles and returned 19 kickoffs for 464 yards. By the end of the year Stanback was the Alouettes' team nominee for both Most Outstanding Rookie and Most Outstanding Special Teams Player awards.

Stanback had a breakout game in Week 4 of the 2019 season, rushing for 203 yards and three touchdowns. He was named one of three players of the month for the month of July. He played in 14 regular season games for the Alouettes in 2019, recording 170 carries for 1048 rushing yards and five touchdowns and 33 receptions for 329 receiving yards. At season's end he was named a CFL All-Star.

=== Las Vegas Raiders ===
On January 3, 2020, the Las Vegas Raiders signed Stanback to a reserve/futures contract. He was waived on August 23, 2020.

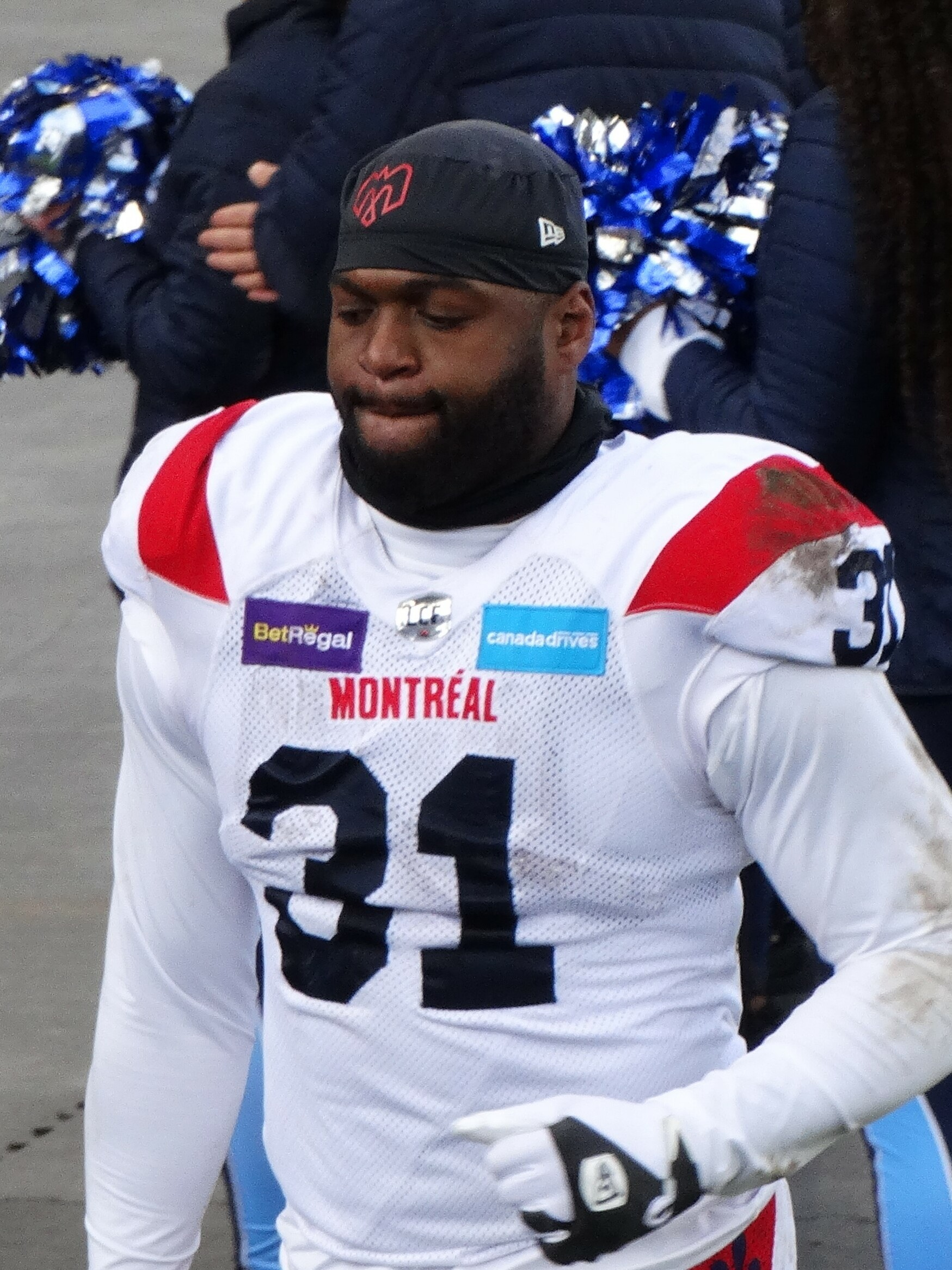
Stanback with the Montreal Alouettes in 2022

=== Montreal Alouettes (second stint) ===
On December 14, 2020, it was announced that Stanback had re-signed with the Alouettes to a two-year contract. In 2021, he played in 12 regular season games in a shortened season, but still recorded a 1000-yard season after recording 193 carries for 1,176 yards and three touchdowns. He also tied a single-game career-high total for rushing yards after rushing 24 times for 203 yards and a touchdown against the Toronto Argonauts on October 22, 2021. At the end of the season, he was named the East Division's Most Outstanding Player.

In 2022, Stanback suffered a broken ankle in the first game of the season and was placed on the six-game injured reserve list. He returned to practice on September 27, 2022, and played in the final four games remaining in the regular season. He played in five regular season games where he had 34 rush attempts for 153 yards and one touchdown in addition to six receptions for 61 yards and a touchdown.

In the 2023 season, Stanback played in 14 regular season games where he had 147 carries for 800 yards and two touchdowns as well as 27 receptions for 241 yards and one receiving touchdown. He also played in both playoff games, including the East Final victory over the Toronto Argonauts, where the Alouettes qualified for their first Grey Cup appearance since 2010. In Stanback's first Grey Cup game, he had nine carries for 68 yards, including a 32-yard touchdown run in the first quarter, and won his first championship as the Alouettes defeated the Winnipeg Blue Bombers in the 110th Grey Cup game. As a pending free agent in the following off-season, Stanback was granted an early release on January 30, 2024.

=== BC Lions ===
On February 6, 2024, the BC Lions announced that they had signed Stanback to a one-year contract. In 2024, he played in 18 regular season games where he had 235 carries for 1,175 yards and three touchdowns along with 64 receptions for 413 yards and two touchdowns. Following the signing of James Butler, Stanback was released on January 9, 2025.

=== Ottawa Redblacks ===
On January 10, 2025, it was announced that Stanback had signed with the Ottawa Redblacks. Stanback split reps with Daniel Adeboboye for much of the year; while only seeing single digit rushing attempts in 12 out of 17 games played, Stanback still finished the season with over 900 yards from scrimmage and 5 total touchdowns. He became a free agent upon the expiry of his contract on February 10, 2026.

== CFL career statistics ==
		Rushing							Receiving
Year	Team	GP	GS	Att	Yards	Avg	Long	TD	Rec	Yards	Avg	Long	TD
2018	Montreal	16	8	81	539	6.6	72	0	24	297	12.3	59	2
2019	Montreal	14	13	171	1048	6.2	49	5	33	329	10.0	46	0
2021	Montreal	12	12	193	1176	6.1	65	3	16	114	7.1	24	0
2022	Montreal	5	5	34	153	4.5	19	1	6	61	10.1	21	1
2023	Montreal	14	12	147	800	5.4	69	2	27	241	8.9	31	1
2024	BC	18	18	231	1175	5.1	38	3	46	413	8.9	45	2
2025	Ottawa	17	17	147	698	4.7	23	4	36	278	7.7	18	1
CFL totals		97	86	1,003	5,589	5.6	72	18	189	1,749	9.3	59	7

== College statistics ==
Season	Team	GP	Rushing				Receiving			
Season	Team	GP	Att	Yds	Avg	TD	Rec	Yds	Avg	TD
2013	UCF	13	105	443	4.2	6	15	186	12.4	1
2014	UCF	10	189	697	3.7	10	11	55	5.0	2
2015	UCF	2	12	11	0.9	0	1	3	3.0	0 (Note: Stanback's 2015 receiving figures are not reported directly; they are the difference between his UCF career totals of 27 receptions for 244 yards and three touchdowns and his 2013 and 2014 totals.)
2016	Virginia Union	10	207	1,299	6.3	15	12	165	13.8	3
Career		35	513	2,450	4.8	31	39	409	10.5	6
