= 2014 UCF Knights football team =

American college football season

2014 UCF Knights football

The American co–champion

St. Petersburg Bowl vs. NC State, L 27–34
- Conference: American Athletic Conference
- Record: 9–4 (7–1 The American)
- Head coach: George O'Leary (11th season)
- Offensive coordinator: Charlie Taaffe (6th season)
- Offensive scheme: Pro-style, option
- Defensive coordinator: Tyson Summers (1st season)
- Base defense: 4–3
- Home stadium: Bright House Networks Stadium

2014 American Athletic Conference football standings
	Conf.			Overall
Team	W		L	W		L
No. 25 Memphis +	7	–	1	10	–	3
Cincinnati +	7	–	1	9	–	4
UCF +	7	–	1	9	–	4
East Carolina	5	–	3	8	–	5
Houston	5	–	3	8	–	5
Temple	4	–	4	6	–	6
South Florida	3	–	5	4	–	8
Tulane	2	–	6	3	–	9
Tulsa	2	–	6	2	–	10
UConn	1	–	7	2	–	10
SMU	1	–	7	1	–	11
+ – Conference co-champions; Rankings from AP Poll

The 2014 UCF Knights football team represented the University of Central Florida in the 2014 NCAA Division I FBS football season. The Knights were members of the American Athletic Conference (The American), and played their home games at Bright House Networks Stadium on UCF's main campus in Orlando, Florida. The Knights were led by head coach George O'Leary, who was in his eleventh season with the team.

The 2014 season was UCF's second as a member of The American. UCF set a program mark with its first undefeated home record since moving into Bright House Networks Stadium in 2007. On November 1, UConn snapped UCF's 11-game undefeated conference winning streak. The Knights were 8–0 in American Athletic Conference play in 2013, and won their first three conference games in 2014 to sit at 11–0 up to that point.

After a last-second loss to Penn State in the Croke Park Classic on opening day, the Knights lost to Missouri, eventual winners of the SEC East. The Knights won nine of their next ten games, including a 6–0 record at home, and became bowl eligible in mid-November. UCF clinched a share of the conference title on December 4 by virtue of a 51-yard Hail Mary touchdown as time expired at East Carolina. Over two years, UCF is 15–1 in American Conference play. The Knights finished the regular season unranked, but received votes in both the AP and Coaches polls. They finished their season against NC State in the St. Petersburg Bowl, where they lost 34–27.

== Personnel ==
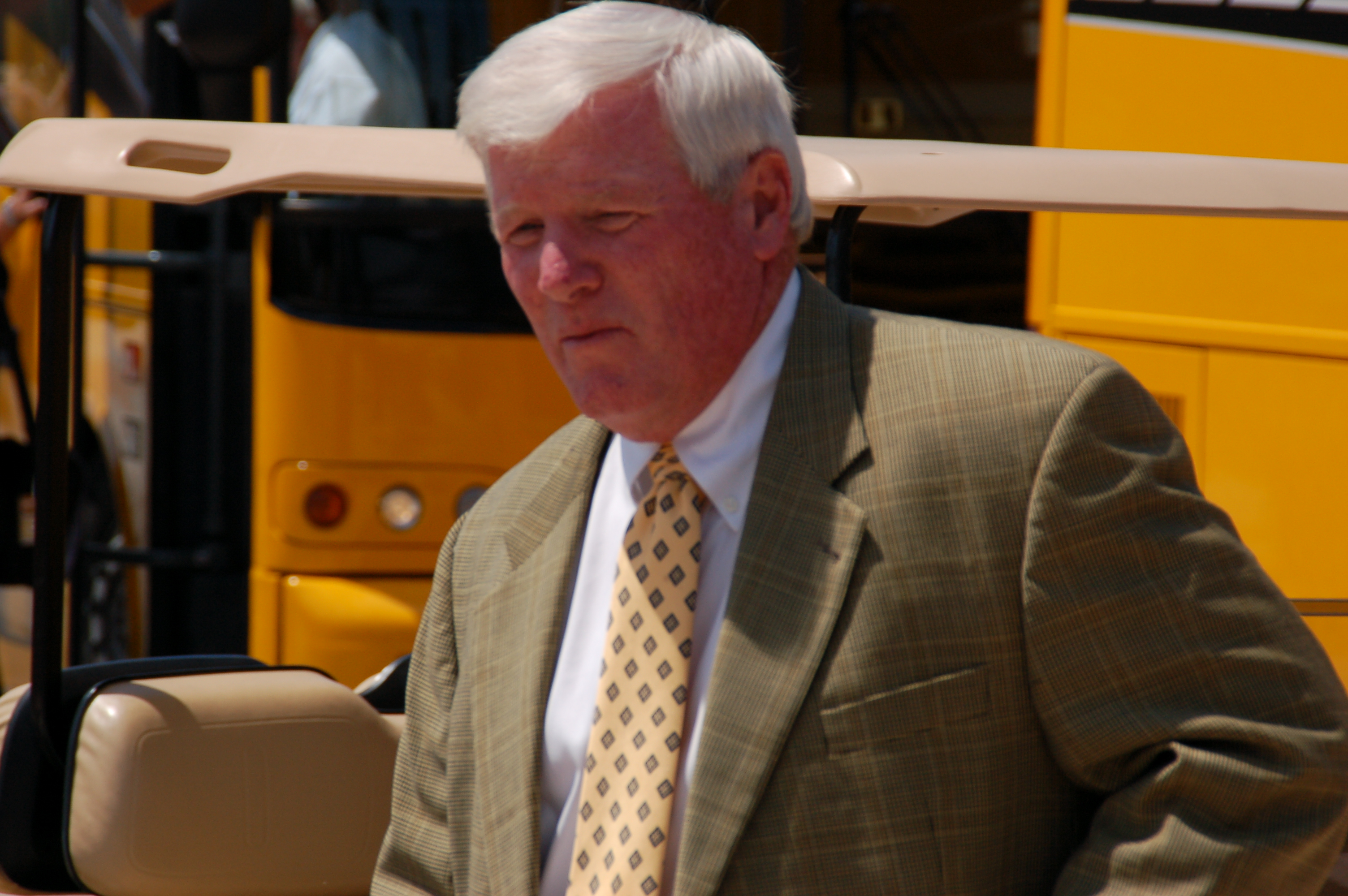
Head coach George O'Leary

=== Coaching staff ===
2014 UCF Knights coaching staff
Head coaches: Head coach – George O'Leary; Asst. Head Coach/offensive line – Brent Key; Offensive coaches: Offensive coordinator/quarterbacks – Charlie Taaffe; Running backs – Danny Barrett; Wide receivers – Sean Beckton; Tight ends – Allen Mogridge; Defensive coaches: Defensive coordinator/linebackers – Tyson Summers; Defensive backs – Kirk Callahan; Defensive line – Lorenzo Costantini	Special teams: Special teams coordinator – Mike Buscemi; Supporting Strength & Conditioning coach: S&C Support – Stefan Liskiewicz; Administrative staff: Athletic Director (A.D.) – Todd Stansbury; Asst. A.D. for Football Operations – Marty O'Leary; Director of player development – Kristy Belden; Director of player personnel – Keegan Kennedy

=== Roster ===
2014 UCF Knights roster
Quarterbacks: 2 Nick Patti – (redshirt) sophomore; 8 Tyler Harris – (redshirt) freshman; 13 Justin Holman – sophomore; 14 Pete DiNovo – (redshirt) freshman; Halfbacks: 32 Mario Mathis – (redshirt) freshman; 39 Joseph Puopolo – (redshirt) junior; 43 Justin Rae – (redshirt) freshman; Fullbacks: 17 Cedric Thompson – (redshirt) junior; 44 Mark Messeguer – (redshirt) freshman; 45 Daron Humphrey – (redshirt) sophomore; Runningbacks: 4 Micah Reed – sophomore; 7 Dontravious Wilson – sophomore; 22 Michael Willett – (redshirt) freshman; 24 Blake Tiralosi – (redshirt) sophomore; 28 William Stanback – sophomore; 29 CJ Jones – (redshirt) freshman; Wide receivers: 3 Jackie Williams – (redshirt) senior; 6 Rannell Hall – senior; 9 J.J. Worton – (redshirt) senior; 10 Kyle Coltrain – (redshirt) freshman; 11 Breshad Perriman – junior; 19 Joshua Reese – (redshirt) senior; 20 Taylor Oldham – (redshirt) sophomore; 23 Jonathan Boone – freshman; 27 Tristan Reaves – (redshirt) freshman; 30 Trace Ryan – (redshirt) freshman; 80 Tre'Quan Smith – (redshirt) freshman; 81 Chris Johnson – (redshirt) freshman; 82 Jamari Fye – (redshirt) freshman; 86 Michael Colubiale – (redshirt) freshman; 88 Jordan Akins – freshman; 89 Hayden Jones – (redshirt) sophomore	Tight ends: 46 Zack Laurinaitis – (redshirt) freshman; 84 Justin Tukes – senior; 85 Kevin Miller – (redshirt) junior; 87 Cal Bloom – (redshirt) sophomore; Offensive line: 51 Chris Larsen – (redshirt) freshman; 55 Joey Grant – (redshirt) junior; 60 Collin Mills – (redshirt) freshman; 61 Tarik Cook – (redshirt) junior; 62 Micah Anderson – (redshirt) sophomore; 63 Tarik Milner – (redshirt) senior; 66 Aaron Evans – (redshirt) freshman; 67 Jared Warren – (redshirt) freshman; 68 Charles Sprenkel – (redshirt) freshman; 70 Luke Palmer – (redshirt) freshman; 71 Chester Brown – (redshirt) sophomore; 72 Torrian Wilson – (redshirt) senior; 73 Jason Rae – sophomore; 74 Michael Campbell – (redshirt) sophomore; 75 Tate Hernly – (redshirt) freshman; 76 Colby Watson – (redshirt) sophomore; 78 Wyatt Miller – (redshirt) freshman; 79 Chavis Dickey – freshman; Linebackers: 15 Michael Easton – senior; 23 Willie Mitchell – senior; 34 Justin McDonald – sophomore; 40 Chequan Burkett – (redshirt) freshman; 41 Terrance Plummer – senior; 46 Jordan Franks – freshman; 50 Domenic Spencer – junior; 51 Errol Clarke – junior; 52 Maurice Russell – (redshirt) sophomore; 53 Tyler Linde – (redshirt) sophomore; 57 Troy Gray – senior; 58 Caleb Perez – (redshirt) freshman; 59 Demeitre Brim – (redshirt) sophomore	Defensive line: 42 Stanley Sylverain – (redshirt) sophomore; 43 Deondre Bennett – sophomore; 44 Miles Pace – (redshirt) junior; 47 Deion Green – (redshirt) junior; 49 Seyvon Lowry – (redshirt) sophomore; 69 Thomas Niles – (redshirt) junior; 90 Lance McDowdell – junior; 91 Joey Connors – (redshirt) freshman; 92 Luke Adams – (redshirt) sophomore; 93 Tony Guerad – (redshirt) freshman; 94 Demetris Anderson – (redshirt) junior; 95 Jamiyus Pittman – freshman; 96 A.J. Wooten – (redshirt) freshman; 97 Jock Petree – (redshirt) freshman; 98 Rob Sauvao – (redshirt) senior; 99 Jaryl Mamea – (redshirt) senior; Defensive backs: 10 Shaquill Griffin – sophomore; 12 Jacoby Glenn – (redshirt) sophomore; 16 Mark Rucker – (redshirt) sophomore; 18 Shaquem Griffin – (redshirt) freshman; 21 Drico Johnson – (redshirt) sophomore; 22 Jared Henry – (redshirt) sophomore; 24 D.J. Killings – sophomore; 25 Kyle Gibson – (redshirt) freshman; 26 Clayton Geathers – (redshirt) senior; 27 Sean Beckton – (redshirt) senior; 30 Brendin Straubel – (redshirt) junior; 31 Chris Williams – (redshirt) freshman; 33 Tre Neal – (redshirt) freshman; 37 Brandon Alexander – senior; 38 Jordan Ozerites – (redshirt) senior	Punters/Kickers: 18 Rodrigo Quirarte – (redshirt) senior; 35 Sean Galvin – (redshirt) senior; 36 Caleb Houston – (redshirt) sophomore; 47 Connor O'Sullivan – (redshirt) freshman; 48 Mac Loudermilk – (redshirt) freshman; 49 Matthew Wright – (redshirt) freshman; 83 Shawn Moffitt – senior; Snappers: 54 Gage Marsil – (redshirt) sophomore; 56 Scott Teal – (redshirt) senior; 59 Mario Elliott – (redshirt) freshman; Terms: Freshman – A player in his first year.; Sophomore – A player in his second year.; Junior – A player in his third year.; Senior – A player in his fourth year.; Redshirt – A player who sat out a previous season.
"2014 Football Roster". UCF Athletics Association.

== Schedule ==
The 2014 schedule was officially released by The American on February 12, 2014. The 2014 schedule was developed as a "bridge" schedule, until a permanent system was developed by the conference to address expanded membership and the creation of divisions by 2015. UCF faced eight conference opponents: UConn, East Carolina, Houston, SMU, South Florida, Temple, Tulane, and Tulsa.

The Knights played four non-conference games: Penn State (Big Ten), Missouri (SEC), Bethune-Cookman (FCS), and BYU (IND). UCF had three bye weeks in the 2014 season: their first during week two, before facing Missouri, the second during week five, before facing Houston, and the third during week nine, before facing Tulsa. UCF's opener in Dublin, Ireland marked the first time that the team played outside the United States.

Date	Time	Opponent	Site	TV	Result	Attendance
August 30	8:30 am	vs. Penn State*	Croke Park; Dublin, IRE (Croke Park Classic)	ESPN2	L 24–26	53,304
September 13	12:00 pm	at No. 20 Missouri*	Faurot Field; Columbia, MO	SECN	L 10–38	60,348
September 20	6:00 pm	No. 12 (FCS) Bethune–Cookman*	Bright House Networks Stadium; Orlando, FL	ESPN3	W 41–7	44,510
October 2	7:00 pm	at Houston	TDECU Stadium; Houston, TX	ESPN	W 17–12	26,685
October 9	7:30 pm	BYU*	Bright House Networks Stadium; Orlando, FL	ESPN	W 31–24 ^{OT}	41,547
October 18	12:00 pm	Tulane	Bright House Networks Stadium; Orlando, FL	ESPNU	W 20–13	35,015
October 25	5:00 pm	Temple^{†}	Bright House Networks Stadium; Orlando, FL	CBSSN	W 34–14	39,554
November 1	12:00 pm	at UConn	Rentschler Field; East Hartford, CT (Civil Conflict)	CBSSN	L 29–37	28,751
November 14	8:00 pm	Tulsa	Bright House Networks Stadium; Orlando, FL	ESPN2	W 31–7	35,323
November 22	12:00 pm	SMU	Bright House Networks Stadium; Orlando, FL	ESPNews	W 53–7	30,920
November 28	12:00 pm	at South Florida	Raymond James Stadium; Tampa, FL (War on I–4)	ESPN2	W 16–0	36,963
December 4	7:30 pm	at East Carolina	Dowdy–Ficklen Stadium; Greenville, NC	ESPN	W 32–30	41,259
December 26	8:00 pm	vs. NC State*	Tropicana Field; St. Petersburg, FL (St. Petersburg Bowl)	ESPN	L 27–34	26,675
*Non-conference game; ^{†}Homecoming; Rankings from AP Poll released prior to the game; All times are in Eastern time

== Game summaries ==
=== Penn State ===
Penn State vs. UCF – Game Summary

Quarter	1	2	3	4	Total
Nittany Lions	7	3	10	6	26
Knights	0	3	7	14	24

at Croke Park, Dublin, Ireland

- Date: August 30, 2014
- Game time: 8:30 a.m. EDT (1:30 p.m. IST)
- Game weather: 60 °F (16 °C), Cloudy
- Game attendance: 53,304
- Referee: Todd LaPenta (The American)
- TV announcers (ESPN2): Mike Patrick (play-by-play), Ed Cunningham (color commentator), Jeannine Edwards (sideline reporter), and Kenny Mayne (sideline reporter)
- Recap

Game information

First quarter

- PSU – Zach Zwinak 1-yard run, 8:20 (PSU 7–0)

Second quarter

- UCF – Shawn Moffitt 36-yard field goal, 12:26 (PSU 7–3)
- PSU – Sam Ficken 22-yard field goal, 6:20 (PSU 10–3)

Third quarter

- PSU – Sam Ficken 33-yard field goal, 6:56 (PSU 13–3)
- UCF – Justin Holman 1-yard run, 2:39 (PSU 13–10)
- PSU – Geno Lewis 79-yard pass from Christian Hackenberg, 0:55 (PSU 20–10)

Fourth quarter

- UCF – Joshua Reese 10-yard pass from Justin Holman, 11:31 (PSU 20–17)
- PSU – Sam Ficken 24-yard field goal, 3:30 (PSU 23–17)
- UCF – Justin Holman 6-yard run, 1:13 (UCF 24–23)
- PSU – Sam Ficken 36-yard field goal, 0:00 (PSU 26–24)

Top Passer

- Justin holman – 9/14, 204 YDS, TD

Top Rusher

- Dontravious wilson – 21 CAR, 34 YDS

Top Receiver

- J.J. Worton – 5 REC, 83 YDS

This was the fourth meeting between the Knights and Nittany Lions, with Penn State now holding a 3–1 record. UCF won the last meeting in 2013, 34–31. With both teams experiencing significant changes from the prior season, including both Blake Bortles and Storm Johnson who entered the 2014 NFL draft, the two teams started slow. The Knights offense was anemic in the first half behind redshirt freshman Pete DiNovo. Once DiNovo was replaced by sophomore quarterback Justin Holman in the third quarter, UCF's offense quickly gained traction, starting with a 70-yard drive which culminated with a quarterback sneak into the end zone. The Knights and Nittany Lions traded scores, and down by six points with 3:30 remaining, Holman led the Knights on a 75-yard touchdown drive capped off by a six-yard run by the quarterback. Unfortunately, the quick scoring drive left enough time on the clock for Penn State quarterback Christian Hackenberg to get the Nittany Lions in field goal range. As time expired, Sam Ficken hit a 36-yard field goal which gave Penn State the 26–24 win.

The loss snapped UCF's nine game winning streak dating back to October 5, 2013 – the third longest active streak amongst FBS schools at the time. It was also the Knights first loss to an unranked team since December 1, 2012. For Penn State, the victory marked the first for new head coach James Franklin. This was also UCF's first game played outside the United States, and the 2014 Croke Park Classic became the highest-attended college football game ever played in Ireland.

=== Missouri ===
UCF vs. #20 Missouri – Game Summary

Quarter	1	2	3	4	Total
Knights	3	7	0	0	10
#20 Tigers	7	7	7	17	38

at Faurot Field, Columbia, Missouri

- Date: September 13, 2014
- Game time: 12:00 p.m. EDT
- Game weather: 52 °F (11 °C), Sunny
- Game attendance: 60,348
- Referee: John McDaid (The American)
- TV announcers (SEC Network): Dave Neal (play-by-play), Andre Ware (color commentator), and Laura Rutledge (sideline reporter)
- Recap

Game information

First Quarter

- MIZZ – Jimmie Hunt 11-yard pass from Maty Mauk, 10:11 (MIZZ 7–0)
- UCF – Shawn Moffitt 19-yard field goal, 3:30 (MIZZ 7–3)

Second Quarter

- UCF – William Stanback 2-yard pass from Justin Holman, 12:17 (UCF 10–7)
- MIZZ – Jimmie Hunt 10-yard pass from Maty Mauk, 6:12 (MIZZ 14–10)

Third Quarter

- MIZZ – Bud Sasser 21-yard pass from Maty Mauk, 1:43 (MIZZ 21–10)

Fourth Quarter

- MIZZ – Bud Sasser 22-yard pass from Maty Mauk, 11:32 (MIZZ 28–10)
- MIZZ – Andrew Baggett 26-yard field goal, 4:13 (MIZZ 31–10)
- MIZZ – Singleton 60-yard fumble recovery, 0:13 (MIZZ 38–10)

Top Passer

- Justin holman – 22/36, 209 YDS, TD, 2 INT

Top Rusher

- William stanback – 15 CAR, 33 YDS

Top Receiver

- Rannell hall – 8 REC, 73 YDS

After trailing 10–7 midway through the second quarter, the Tigers took control and scored 31 unanswered points to win 38–10. Mizzou quarterback Maty Mauk threw four touchdowns and one pick for 144 yards. UCF QB Justin Holman, earning his first career start, threw 209 yards and one touchdown. The Knights defense surrendered 322 yards of offense, 144 through the air and 178 on the ground. RB William Stanback had 33 yards on 15 carries, and WR Rannell Hall had 73 yards on 8 receptions. UCF and Mizzou had met once previously, a 2012 match-up in Orlando that Mizzou won 21–16. The loss marked UCF's first against a ranked team in its last three chances, and led to UCF's first 0–2 start since 2005.

=== Bethune-Cookman ===
Bethune-Cookman vs. UCF – Game Summary

Quarter	1	2	3	4	Total
Wildcats	7	0	0	0	7
Knights	3	17	14	7	41

at Bright House Networks Stadium, Orlando, Florida

- Date: September 20, 2014
- Game time: 6:00 p.m. EDT
- Game weather: 80 °F (27 °C), Cloudy
- Game attendance: 44,510
- Referee: Jonah Monroe (The American)
- TV announcers (ESPN3): Mark Neely (play-by-play), Jay Walker (color commentator), and Tiffany Greene (sideline reporter)
- Recap

Game information

First quarter

- UCF – Rodrigo Quirarte 37-yard field goal, 5:26 (UCF 3–0)
- BCU – Anthony Jordan 1-yard field run, 1:40 (BCU 7–3)

Second quarter

- UCF – J.J. Worton 35-yard pass from Justin Holman, 11:57 (UCF 10–7)
- UCF – Breshad Perriman 61-yard pass from Justin Holman, 9:37 (UCF 17–7)
- UCF – Rodrigo Quirarte 37-yard field goal, 6:19 (UCF 20–7)

Third quarter

- UCF – William Stanback 9-yard field run, 13:28 (UCF 27–7)
- UCF – Cedric Thompson 1-yard field run, 5:29 (UCF 24–7)

Fourth quarter

- UCF – William Stanback 2-yard field run, 5:09 (UCF 41–7)

Top Passer

- Justin holman – 6/11, 135 YDS, 2 TD

Top Rusher

- William stanback – 15 CAR, 104 YDS, 2 TD

Top Receiver

- Breshad perriman – 3 REC, 98 YDS, TD

The Knights started slow, trailing the Wildcats late in the first-quarter before UCF answered with 41 unanswered points. UCF had won the last game against Bethune-Cookman in 1995 with a score of 38–7. This victory marked the first win for the Knights this season, and the Knights now have an 11–5 winning record against the Wildcats. Quarterback Justin Holman 6-for-11 for 145 yards and two touchdowns. RB William Stanback rushed for a then-season-high 104 yards and two scores. Senior WR Breshad Perriman had 3 receptions for 98 yards and a touchdown. UCF's defense held BCU to 173 total yards of offense behind five first-half sacks.

=== Houston ===
UCF vs. Houston – Game Summary

Quarter	1	2	3	4	Total
Knights	0	7	10	0	17
Cougars	3	3	0	6	12

at TDECU Stadium, Houston Texas

- Date: October 2, 2014
- Game time: 7:00 p.m. EDT
- Game weather: 90 °F (32 °C), Mostly Sunny
- Game attendance: 26,685
- Referee: Todd LaPenta
- TV announcers (ESPN): Ray Bentley (play-by-play), Dave LaMont (color commentator), and Kayce Smith (sideline reporter)
- Recap

Game information

First Quarter

- HOU – Kyle Bullard 39-yard field goal, 9:50 (HOU 3–0)

Second Quarter

- UCF – Jackie Williams 52-yard pass from Justin Holman, 9:27 (UCF 7–3)
- HOU – Kyle Bullard 42-yard field goal, 1:58 (MIZZ 7–6)

Third Quarter

- UCF – Breshad Perriman 6-yard pass from Justin Holman, 10:27 (UCF 14–6)
- UCF – Shawn Moffit 42-yard field goal, 8:25 (UCF 17–6)

Fourth Quarter

- HOU – Kyle Bullard 51-yard field goal, 11:06 (UCF 17–9)
- HOU – Kyle Bullard 49-yard field goal, 4:46 (UCF 17–12)

Top Passer

- Justin holman – 6/18, 101 YDS, 2 TD

Top Rusher

- William stanback – 14 CAR, 44 YDS

Top Receiver

- Breshad perriman – 1 REC, 52 YDS, TD

For the second consecutive year, the Knights won a close contest against the Cougars. UCF and Houston played five times previously, with UCF winning four games, including a 19–14 homecoming contest in 2013 that helped to secure UCF's first BCS bid. The Knights took a 7–6 lead into halftime, and scored two more times to take a 17–6 lead into the third quarter. Houston responded with two field goals to narrow the score to 17–12. After holding the Cougars to four field goals, UCF prevailed 17–12, capped off by a remarkable goal line stand in the final seconds. Brandon Alexander saved the game for the Knights when he hit Houston quarterback Greg Ward Jr.'s arm and knocked the ball loss for a touchback as he dove and stretched for the end-zone pylon with 24 seconds left in the game. Holman was 6-of-8 for 101 yards and two scores, Stanback had 44 yards on 14 carries, and Perriman had one touchdown reception for 52 yards.

=== BYU ===
BYU vs. UCF – Game Summary

Quarter	1	2	3	4	OT	Total
Cougars	0	3	21	0	0	24
Knights	10	0	7	7	7	31

at Bright House Networks Stadium, Orlando, Florida

- Date: October 9, 2014
- Game time: 7:30 p.m. EDT
- Game weather: 81 °F (27 °C), Partly Cloudy
- Game attendance: 41,547
- Referee: Kevin Mar (Big 12)
- TV announcers (ESPN): Rece Davis (play-by-play), David Pollack (color commentator), Jesse Palmer (color commentator), and Samantha Ponder (sideline reporter)
- Recap

Game information

First quarter

- UCF – Justin Holman 5-yard run, 8:54 (UCF 7–0)
- UCF – Shawn Moffit 42-yard field goal, 4:37 (UCF 10–0)

Second quarter

- BYU – Trevor Samson 32-yard field goal, 4:37 (UCF 10–3)

Third quarter

- BYU – Colby Pearson 4-yard pass from Christian Stewart, 11:56 (TIE 10–10)
- BYU – Devin Mahina 15-yard pass from Christian Stewart, 9:30 (BYU 17–10)
- BYU – Devin Mahina 14-yard pass from Christian Stewart, 9:05 (BYU 24–10)
- UCF – William Stanback 2-yard run, 5:37 (BYU 24–17)

Fourth quarter

- BYU – Josh Reese 37-yard pass from Justin Holman, 10:17 (TIE 24–24)

Overtime

- UCF – William Stanback 4-yard pass from Justin Holman (UCF 31–24)

Top Passer

- Justin holman – 30/51, 326 YDS, 2 TD, RUSH TD, 2 INT

Top Rusher

- William stanback – 22 CAR, 44 YDS

Top Receiver

- Josh reese – 5 REC, 87 YDS

This was the second meeting between the programs, with the Cougars winning the only prior game 24–17 in 2011. After the injury to Taysom Hill in the previous game against Utah State, Christian Stewart started his first game for BYU at QB. The Knights defense proved tough as UCF sacked Stewart twice, forcing one fumble, and intercepting one of his passes. After the Knights opened a 10–3 lead going into the half, the Cougar's defense stopped UCF's offense from scoring on 8 consecutive possessions. The defense picked off two UCF passes and forced two UCF fumbles, allowing BYU to have the short field and take the lead in the third quarter. The defensive stand led to 21 unanswered points by BYU. Down 24–10 late in the third quarter, Holman led the Knights on two late drives to tie the game. With 10 minutes left, and after BYU jumped into the neutral zone, Holman found Josh Reese for a 37-yard touchdown pass to tie the game. With the opportunity to take the lead, UCF missed two late field goals in the fourth, forcing the game into overtime.

In overtime, William Stanback caught a 4-yard pass from Holman to give the Knights a 31–24 lead. The Knights defense stood strong, and for the second consecutive game won the match-up on a goal-line stand after stopping the Cougars on fourth down in the redzone.

=== Tulane ===
Tulane vs. UCF – Game Summary

Quarter	1	2	3	4	Total
Green Wave	3	0	3	7	13
Knights	0	13	7	0	20

at Bright House Networks Stadium, Orlando, Florida

- Date: October 18, 2014
- Game time: 12:00 p.m. EDT
- Game weather: 80 °F (27 °C), Sunny
- Game attendance: 35,015
- Referee: Ed Ardito
- TV announcers (ESPNU): Adam Amin (play-by-play) and John Congemi (color commentator)
- Recap

Game information

First quarter

- TLN – Andrew DiRocco 21-yard field goal, 5:12 (TLN 3–0)

Second quarter

- UCF – Shawn Moffit 47-yard field goal, 13:33 (TIE 3–3)
- UCF – William Stanback 1-yard run, 4:20 (UCF 10–3)
- UCF – Shawn Moffit 30-yard field goal, 2:18 (UCF 13–3)

Third quarter

- TLN – Andrew DiRocco 42-yard field goal, 11:14 (UCF 13–6)
- UCF – Breshad Perriman 45-yard pass from Justin Holman, 9:35 (UCF 20–6)

Fourth quarter

- TLN – Lazedrick Thompson 9-yard run, 11:36 (UCF 20–13)

Top Passer

- Justin holman – 9/17, 113 YDS, INT

Top Rusher

- Dontravious wilson – 13 CAR, 51 YDS

Top Receiver

- Rannell hall – 6 REC, 68 YDS

This was the first meeting of Knights and Green Wave as members of The American. The two programs had met five times previously as members of C-USA, with UCF winning four including a 61–14 blowout in 2010. The Knights survived four turnovers – two fumbles and two interceptions – and 67 penalty yards to win the match-up. The game was a test of defenses, with the first score being a 21-yard field goal for Tulane by Andrew DiRocco with five minutes remaining in the first. The Knights responded with a 47-yard field goal by Shawn Moffit seven minutes later. UCF tacked on ten more points before the half, a rushing TD by RB William Stanback and a 30-yard field goal by Moffit. After the half, the Green Wave answered with a field goal. After being replaced in the second quarter by backup QB Nick Patti, Holman reentered the game in the second half and led UCF on a three-play 49-yard drive including a 45-yard touchdown pass to Breshad Perriman. Tulane scored the last points of the game with 11 minutes left in the fourth quarter on a 9-yard rushing touchdown by Lazedrick Thompson.

=== Temple ===
Temple vs. UCF – Game Summary

Quarter	1	2	3	4	Total
Owls	0	14	0	0	14
Knights	17	10	7	0	34

at Bright House Networks Stadium, Orlando, Florida

- Date: October 25, 2014
- Game time: 5:00 p.m. EDT
- Game weather: 82 °F (28 °C), Sunny
- Game attendance: 39,554
- Referee: Tracy Jones
- TV announcers (CBS Sports Network): Dave Ryan (play-by-play), Corey Chavous (color commentator), and Lauren Gardner (sideline reporter)
- Recap

Game information

First quarter

- UCF – JJ Worton 25-yard pass from Justin Holman, 10:21 (UCF 7–0)
- UCF – Shawn Moffit 23-yard field goal, 8:31 (UCF 10–0)
- UCF – William Stanback 1-yard run, 0:44 (UCF 17–0)

Second quarter

- TEM – Romond Deloatch 3-yard pass from PJ Walker, 13:24 (UCF 17–7)
- UCF – Breshad Perriman 54-yard pass from Justin Holman, 10:00 (UCF 24–7)
- TEM – Samuel Benjamin 6-yard blocked punt return, 7:45 (UCF 24–14)
- UCF – Shawn Moffit 19-yard field goal, 0:03 (UCF 27–14)

Third quarter

- UCF – William Stanback 2-yard run, 0:14 (UCF 34–14)

Top Passer

- Justin holman – 25/39, 336 YDS, 2 TD

Top Rusher

- William stanback – 27 CAR, 94 YDS, 2 TD

Top Receiver

- Breshad perriman – 7 REC, 146 YDS, TD

The Knights dominated both facets of the game, outgaining Temple 466 to 182 yards. UCF had won the only previous meeting between the two programs in a dramatic 39–36 victory in 2013. The Knights scored quickly on a 25-yard pass from Justin Holman to JJ Worton and never looked back, taking a 17–0 lead on their first three drives. Holman was 25-of-39 for a season-high 336 yards and three touchdowns. William Stanback had two touchdowns on 94 yards, and senior WR Breshad Perriman had seven receptions for 146 yards. The Knights 446 yards were the most since the 556 yards gained against Baylor in the Fiesta Bowl.

=== UConn ===
UCF vs. Connecticut – Game Summary

Quarter	1	2	3	4	Total
Knights	7	7	7	8	29
Huskies	0	17	14	6	37

at Rentschler Field, East Hartford, Connecticut

- Date: November 1, 2014
- Game time: 12:00 p.m. EDT
- Game weather: 43 °F (6 °C), Cool
- Game attendance: 28,751
- Referee: John McDaid
- TV announcers (CBS Sports Network): Dave Ryan (play-by-play), Corey Chavous (color commentator), and Dana Jacobson (sideline reporter)
- Recap

Game information

First quarter

- UCF – William Stanback 3-yard run, 7:38 (UCF 7–0)

Second quarter

- CON – Deshon Foxx 68-yard run, 12:22 (TIE 7–7)
- UCF – William Stanback 1-yard run, 4:59 (UCF 14–7)
- CON – Noel Thomas 38-yard pass from Chandler Whitmer, 1:12 (TIE 14–14)
- CON – Bobby Puyol 43-yard field goal, 0:00 (CON 17–14)

Third quarter

- UCF – JJ Worton 73-yard pass from Justin Holman, 9:39 (UCF 21–17)
- CON – Ron Johnson 1-yard run, 4:17 (CON 24–21)
- CON – Noel Thomas 22-yard pass from Chandler Whitmer, 1:21 (CON 31–21)

Fourth quarter

- CON – Ron Johnson 2-yard run (kicked blocked), 12:28 (CON 37–21)
- UCF – Breshad Perriman 16-yard pass from Justin Holman (2-pt. conv. good), 5:07 (UCF 37–29)

Top Passer

- Justin holman – 22/42, 284 YDS, 2 TD, 4 INT

Top Rusher

- William stanback – 28 CAR, 141 YDS, 2 TD

Top Receiver

- JJ worton – 11 REC, 178 YDS, TD

UConn ended UCF's American conference win-streak at eleven games, handing the Knights their first regular season conference loss since November 2012 against Tulsa. This loss was also UCF's first to a team that finished the season not bowl eligible since September 2012 against Missouri. The Knights had won the only previous meeting between the two programs in a blowout 62–17 home victory in 2013. The victory was UConn's first against an FBS opponent in 2014. Justin Holman's four interceptions coupled with special team troubles spelled doom for UCF's effort to remain unbeaten in conference play for a second straight year. William Stanback had a season-high 141 rushing yards and two touchdowns. JJ Worton had eleven receptions for 178 yards, including a 73-yard touchdown pass from Holman in the third quarter – the Knights longest play from scrimmage this season.

=== Tulsa ===
Tulsa vs. UCF – Game Summary

Quarter	1	2	3	4	Total
Golden Hurricane	0	7	0	0	7
Knights	3	14	14	0	31

at Bright House Networks Stadium, Orlando, Florida

- Date: November 14, 2014
- Game time: 8:00 p.m. EST
- Game weather: 58 °F (14 °C), Clear
- Game attendance: 35,323
- Referee: Jonah Monroe
- TV announcers (ESPN2): Eamon McAnaney (play-by-play), Danny Kanell (color commentator), and Allison Williams (sideline reporter)
- Recap

Game information

First quarter

- UCF – Rodrigo Quirarte 27-yard field goal, 0:39 (UCF 3–0)

Second quarter

- UCF – J.J. Worton 5-yard pass from Justin Holman, 11:08 (UCF 10–0)
- UCF – Josh Reese 77-yard pass from Justin Holman, 7:57 (UCF 17–0)
- TLS – Keevan Lucas 8-yard pass from Dane Evans, 5:41 (UCF 17–7)

Third quarter

- UCF – Breshad Perriman 25-yard pass from Justin Holman, 9:27 (UCF 24–7)
- UCF – Dontravious Wilson 1-yard run, 1:09 (UCF 31–7)

Top Passer

- Justin holman – 16/27, 291 YDS, 3 TD

Top Rusher

- Dontravious wilson – 17 CAR, 87 YDS, TD

Top Receiver

- Josh reese – 4 REC, 104 YDS, TD

This game marked the Knights' 50th at Bright House Networks Stadium. The Knights and Golden Hurricane had met seven previous times, all as members of Conference USA. The Golden Hurricane won five including the last game for the 2012 conference championship 33–27 in overtime. The Knights gained 501 yards of total offense and held the Golden Hurricane to 201 total yards. UCF also controlled the time of possession, 37 minutes to 23 minutes for Tulsa. Justin Holman was sixteen-of-twenty-seven for 291 yards and Dontravious Wilson rushed for 87 yards on 17 carries. Kickers Shawn Moffit and Sean Galvin were suspended for the game, with Rodrigo Quirarte taking over kicking duties and going one-for-three.

=== SMU ===
SMU vs. UCF – Game Summary

Quarter	1	2	3	4	Total
Mustangs	0	7	0	0	7
Knights	27	10	6	10	53

at Bright House Networks Stadium, Orlando, Florida

- Date: November 22, 2014
- Game time: 12:00p.m. EST
- Game weather: 71 °F (22 °C), Light rain
- Game attendance: 30,920
- Referee: Ed Ardito
- TV announcers (ESPNews): Jason Benetti (play-by-play) and Rocky Boiman (color commentator)
- Recap

Game information

First quarter

- UCF – Dontravious Wilson 1-yard run (2-pt. conv. no good), 10:10 (UCF 6–0)
- UCF – Dontravious Wilson 11-yard run, 7:05 (UCF 13–0)
- UCF – JJ Worton 58-yard pass from Justin Holman, 2:08 (UCF 20–0)
- UCF – Breshad Perriman 18-yard pass from Justin Holman, 1:09 (UCF 27–0)

Second quarter

- SMU – Matt Davis 5-yard run, 14:24 (UCF 27–7)
- UCF – Michael Easton 96-yard kick return, 14:09 (UCF 34–7)
- UCF – Rodrigo Quirarte 31-yard field goal, 0:12 (UCF 37–7)

Third quarter

- UCF – Shawn Moffitt 34-yard field goal, 5:15 (UCF 40–7)
- UCF – Shawn Moffitt 38-yard field goal, 2:28 (UCF 43–7)

Fourth quarter

- UCF – Shawn Moffitt 20-yard field goal, 11:28 (UCF 46–7)
- UCF – Nick Patti 1-yard run, 3:18 (UCF 53–7)

Top Passer

- Justin holman – 15/22, 228 YDS, 2 TD, 2 INT

Top Rusher

- Micah reed – 26 CAR, 112 YDS

Top Receiver

- J.J. Worton – 2 REC, 64 YDS, TD

UCF dominated both sides of the ball in a 53–7 win. The victory marked the first time in over a decade that the Knights went a perfect 6–0 at home. UCF and SMU previously met six time, with UCF winning five including the last game which clinched The American's 2013 conference championship 17–13 in Dallas. The Knights defense held the Mustangs to four first downs and 116 total yards. The four touchdowns are the least UCF has ever allowed against an FBS opponent. QB Justin Holman was fifteen-of-twenty-two for 228 yards and two touchdowns. Senior LB Michael Easton had the Knights first kick return of the year in the second quarter, and senior WR JJ Worton had two receptions for 64 yards and a touchdown. UCF's defense forced five turnovers.

=== South Florida ===
UCF vs. South Florida – Game summary

Quarter	1	2	3	4	Total
Knights	0	14	2	0	16
Bulls	0	0	0	0	0

at Raymond James Stadium, Tampa, Florida

- Date: November 28, 2014
- Game time: 12:00 p.m. EST
- Game weather: 59 °F (15 °C), sunny
- Game attendance: 36,963
- Referee: Todd LaPenta
- TV announcers (ESPN2): Clay Matvick (play-by-play), Anthony Becht (color commentator), and Kayce Smith (sideline reporter)
- Recap

Game information

Second quarter

- UCF – Breshad Perriman 7-yard pass from Justin Holman, 10:38 (UCF 7–0)
- UCF – Rannell Hall 21-yard run, 6:09 (UCF 14–0)

Third quarter

- UCF – Mike White Safety by Thomas Niles, 5:07 (UCF 16–0)

Top passer

- Justin holman – 20/29, 149 yds, TD, INT

Top rusher

- Rannell hall – 10 CAR, 65 yds, TD

Top receiver

- Breshad perriman – 6 REC, 55 yds, TD

This was the sixth meeting of the I–4 Corridor Clash. South Florida won the first four games in the series, and UCF won the last meeting 23–20 in 2013. After a scoreless first quarter, Holman led the Knights on a 17-play, 80-yard scoring drive to open the second quarter. The Knights held the Bulls offense to a three-and-out on the next series, which was followed by an 8-play, 73-yard scoring drive by UCF capped off by a 21-yard run from Rannell Hall. UCF held South Florida to 200 yards of total offense, 5 yards rushing, and forced three turnovers on downs. The Bulls missed a field goal and were not able to convert on three UCF turnovers. With the victory, UCF needed one more win to clinch a share of their second consecutive American conference championship. This was UCF's 14th straight win in a non-Saturday game and the first time in the rivalry that a team was shut out. The game was also the first time that South Florida was held scoreless at home in program history, and the first ever road shutout in a conference game for UCF.

=== East Carolina ===
UCF vs. East Carolina – Game Summary

Quarter	1	2	3	4	Total
Knights	6	17	3	6	32
Pirates	6	3	0	21	30

at Dowdy–Ficklen Stadium, Greenville, North Carolina

- Date: December 4, 2014
- Game time: 7:30p.m. EST
- Game weather: 45 °F (7 °C), Partly cloudy
- Game attendance: 41,259
- Referee: John McDaid
- TV announcers (ESPN): Rece Davis (play-by-play), David Pollack (color commentator), Jesse Palmer (color commentator), and Samantha Ponder (sideline reporter)
- Recap

Game information

First quarter

- UCF – Shawn Moffitt 43-yard field goal, 10:46 (UCF 3–0)
- ECU – Marquez Grayson 6-yard run (XP blocked), 4:19 (ECU 6–3)
- UCF – Shawn Moffitt 38-yard field goal, 0:45 (TIE 6–6)

Second quarter

- UCF– William Stanback 2-yard run, 9:59 (UCF 13–6)
- UCF – Shawn Moffitt 30-yard field goal, 6:35 (UCF 16–6)
- UCF– William Stanback 1-yard run, 2:39 (UCF 23–6)
- ECU– Warren Harvey 37-yard field goal, 0:00 (UCF 23–9)

Third quarter

- UCF – Shawn Moffitt 31-yard field goal, 7:39 (UCF 26–9)

Fourth quarter

- ECU – Cam Worthy 6-yard pass from Shane Carden, 13:16 (UCF 26–16)
- ECU – Marquez Grayson 14-yard pass from Shane Carden, 10:33 (UCF 26–23)
- ECU – Justin Hardy 13-yard pass from Shane Carden, 2:17 (ECU 30–26)
- UCF – Breshad Perriman 51-yard pass from Justin Holman (No XP attempt), 0:00 (ECU 32–30)

Top Passer

- Justin holman – 18/33, 274 YDS

Top Rusher

- William stanback – 24 CAR, 101 YDS, 2 TD

Top Receiver

- Breshad perriman – 4 REC, 139 YDS

UCF clinched a share of the 2014 AAC Conference Championship with a 32–30 win at East Carolina on Thursday night. Justin Holman threw a 51-yard Hail Mary pass to wide receiver Breshad Perriman as time expired. The shocking play came after poor clock management by the Pirates in the final two minutes of the game. The play became known in UCF lore as the Hail Perriman play. Holman threw for 274 yards and William Stanback rushed for 101 yards and two touchdowns on the ground.

Both teams entered with identical 8–3 records (UCF 6–1 and ECU 5–2 in The American), with the Pirates looking to upset the Knights' hope of winning a second consecutive conference title. The Knights defense proved strong, as East Carolina was held to only 14 rushing yards. UCF took a 26–9 lead with 7:39 left in the third quarter, but the Pirates scored 21 unanswered points. A missed field goal, two three-and-outs, and a lost fumble shifted the momentum to the Pirates. Shane Carden's 13-yard touchdown pass to Justin Hardy gave ECU a 30–26 lead with 2:17 left in fourth quarter.

The Knights got the ball with 2:17 to go, but started off the drive with a false start penalty. Holman was then pressured and threw incomplete. On 2nd & 15, the pass rush got to Holman again, and this time he was sacked for a loss of 5. On 3rd & 20, Holman's pass intended for Rannell "Speedy" Hall was nearly intercepted by Brandon Williams. Facing 4th & 20 at their own 15, Holman was hit as he threw. He had Hall open near the line to gain, but the ball sailed incomplete. The Knights turned the ball over on downs, and it appeared the game was essentially over. East Carolina was expected to run out the clock.

The Pirates took over at the UCF 15 yard line with 1:47 left on the clock. On first down, Shane Carden took a knee for a loss of 3. On second down, he took another knee for a loss of 2. The Knights had one time out remaining, and stopped the clock with 1:02 left in regulation. The Pirates faced 3rd & 15 at the UCF 20 yard line. Suddenly it became clear that a stop on defense may give the ball back to the Knights for one last possession. On third down, Carden took a shotgun snap and ran to his right. He dropped to the ground just shy of the sidelines for a 4-yard loss, and kept the clock running. The Pirates wound the play clock down to :00 and took their final timeout with 16 seconds left in regulation. On 4th & 19 at the UCF 24, ECU kept their offense out on the field, passing up on a long field goal attempt or pooch punt. Carden took a shotgun snap, and after a lazy scramble, took a sack back at the 35 yard line for a loss of 11. ECU turned the ball over on downs with 10 seconds to go.

Unexpectedly back in the game, the UCF offense was back out on the field. On first down, Justin Holman fired a quick 14-yard out route to Josh Reese, who stepped out of bounds at the 49 with five seconds remaining. On the final play of the game, Holman threw up a 51-yard Hail Mary to the endzone. Breshad Perriman got behind three Pirate defenders, and leapt up to grab the ball at the 1 yard line. He took two steps and was in the endzone for the game-winning score. A stunned crowd at Dowdy–Ficklen Stadium saw the Knights win 32–30, earning the program's second consecutive conference championship, and fourth since 2007.

=== St. Petersburg Bowl ===
Bitcoin St. Petersburg Bowl – Game Summary

Quarter	1	2	3	4	Total
Wolfpack	7	10	14	3	34
Knights	3	7	3	14	27

at Tropicana Field, St. Petersburg, Florida

- Date: December 26, 2014
- Game time: 8:00p.m. EST
- Game weather: Domed stadium
- Game attendance: 26,675
- Referee: Don Willard (MAC)
- TV announcers (ESPN/ESPN Radio): Adam Amin (play-by-play), John Congemi, (color commentator), and Kaylee Hartung (sideline reporter)/Dave LaMont (play-by-play), Anthony Becht (color commentator), and Cara Capuano (sideline reporter)
- Recap

Game information

First Quarter
Second Quarter
Third Quarter
Fourth Quarter

Top Passer

- Justin Holman – 23/53, 291 YDS, 3 TD, INT

Top Rusher

- William Stanback – 12 CAR, 38 YDS

Top Receiver

- Breshad Perriman – 9 REC, 138 YDS

This was UCF's third appearance in the St. Petersburg Bowl. The Knights were defeated by Rutgers in 2009, and beat Ball State in 2012. UCF and NC State last met in a 2010 match-up won by the Wolfpack 28–21. After a 10–7 start midway through the second quarter, NC State took the lead 17–10 by halftime. NC State scored a 14–3 run which turned the game into a commanding 31–13 lead by the end of the 3rd quarter. After NC State kicked a field goal to turn the lead to 34–13, Justin Holman led a 4th quarter drive that gave UCF two touchdowns, both to Josh Reese, shortening the lead to 34–27. After the last touchdown, UCF attempted an on-side kick, but failed, sealing the game for the Wolfpack. Justin Holman was 23-for-53 for 291 yards and 3 touchdowns. Josh Reese, who was the Knight's game MVP, had 6 receptions for 75 yards and 3 touchdowns.

This loss snapped UCF's three bowl game winning streak, as well as UCF's two 10-win season streak, finishing the season only 9–4 (7–1).

== Awards and milestones ==
=== Conference awards ===
- Jacoby Glenn — American Athletic Conference Co-Defensive Player of the Year

=== All-American Teams ===
Each year several publications release lists of their ideal "team". The athletes on these lists are referred to as All-Americans. The NCAA recognizes five All-American lists. They are the Associated Press (AP), American Football Coaches Association (AFCA), Football Writers Association of America (FWAA), Sporting News (TSN), and the Walter Camp Football Foundation (WCFF).

- Jacoby Glenn (AP)

=== All-Conference Teams ===
- American Athletic Conference First Team: Clayton Geathers, Jacoby Glenn, Breshad Perriman, Terrance Plummer, William Stanback
- American Athletic Conference Second Team: Brandon Alexander, Jaryl Mamea, Thomas Niles, Torrian Wilson

=== American offensive player of the week ===
- October 13: Justin Holman
- December 8: Breshad Perriman

=== American defensive player of the week ===
- October 13: Terrance Plumer
- October 27: Jacoby Glenn

=== American special teams player of the week ===
- October 13: JJ Worton
- November 24: Michael Easton
- December 8: Shawn Moffit

=== School records ===
- Tied-best regular season home record: 6–0
- Longest conference win steak: 11 games (2013–14)
- Most career points responsible for: Shawn Moffit, 304

== Offseason ==
On January 11, 2015, wide receiver Breshad Perriman announced he would enter the NFL draft after his junior year. He would be followed by Jacoby Glenn on January 13.

=== NFL draft ===
Two former players were selected in the 2015 NFL draft:

Round	Pick	Overall	Name	Position	Team
1st	26	26	Breshad Perriman	Wide receiver	Baltimore Ravens
4th	10	109	Clayton Geathers	Safety	Indianapolis Colts

This was the first time in program history that a Knight was picked in the first round in two consecutive years.

Additionally, one player signed as an undrafted free agent:

Name	Position	Team
Rannell Hall	Wide receiver	Tampa Bay Buccaneers
