= Tony Levine =

American football player and coach (born 1972)

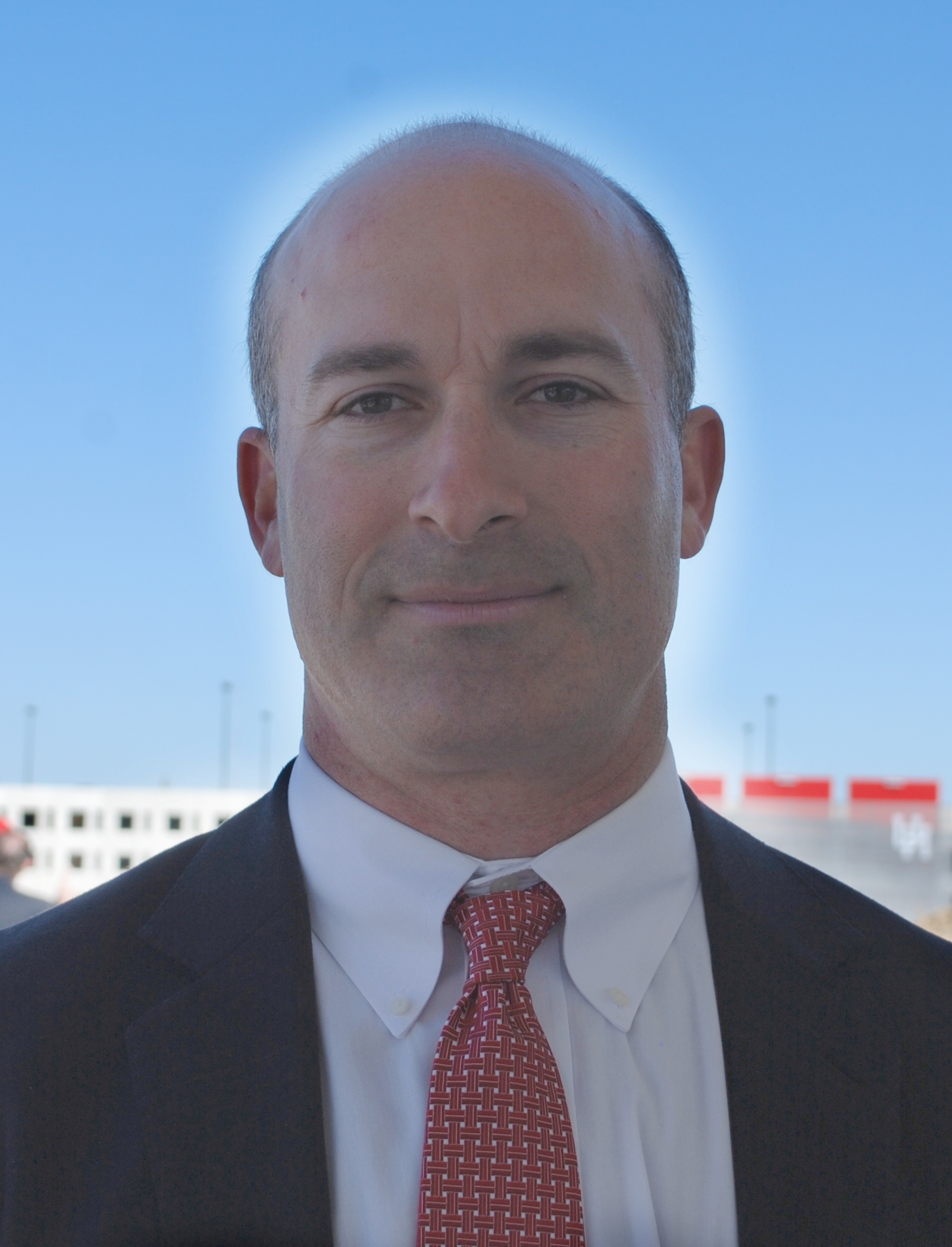

Biographical details
- Born: October 28, 1972 (age 54); Saint Paul, Minnesota, U.S.

Playing career
- 1992–1995: Minnesota
- 1996: Minnesota Fighting Pike
- Position: Wide receiver

Coaching career (HC unless noted)
- 1996: Highland Park HS (MN) (freshman)
- 1997–1999: Texas State (WR/TE)
- 2000–2001: Auburn (GA)
- 2002: Louisiana Tech (ST/TE)
- 2003: Louisville (football ops)
- 2004–2005: Louisville (ST/OLB)
- 2006–2007: Carolina Panthers (asst. S&C/asst. ST)
- 2008–2011: Houston (ST/TE/outside WR)
- 2011–2014: Houston
- 2016: Western Kentucky (ST/TE)
- 2017: Purdue (co-OC/ST/TE)

Head coaching record
- Overall: 21–17
- Bowls: 1–1

Tony Levine (born October 28, 1972) is an American former football coach who last coached at Purdue as the special teams coordinator, co-offensive coordinator, and tight ends coach. He is a former head coach for the Houston Cougars football team. Levine now owns and operates a Chick-fil-A restaurant in the Houston suburb of Missouri City, Texas.

A walk-on wide receiver for the Minnesota Golden Gophers under Jim Wacker, Levine became a three-year starter and was twice named to the Academic All-Big Ten team. After his graduation from Minnesota, Levine played arena football for the Minnesota Fighting Pike and started his own sports marketing company (Levine Marketing Group) in 1996. Before coming to Houston, the St. Paul native coached at Texas State, Auburn, Louisiana Tech, Louisville and the NFL's Carolina Panthers.

== Early and personal life ==
Levine was born in Saint Paul, Minnesota, to Marvin and Harriet Levine. His father, Marvin Levine, worked as a certified public accountant and played big-band trumpet. His mother, Harriet, was a high school guidance counselor. His brother, Jeffrey Levine, is a band and orchestra director at Jefferson High School in Bloomington, Minnesota and is also one of the most accomplished trumpet players on the Minnesota music scene. Levine and his wife Erin have four children (Ben, Asher, Willa, and Eli).

== High school and college ==
Attending Highland Park High School in Saint Paul, Levine finished ranked in the top 10% of his graduating class and was a multi-sport athlete, playing tennis, soccer, basketball, track, baseball and football. Levine was also a member of the marching band and jazz band, where he excelled at saxophone. He was named a high school All-American saxophone performer in both his junior and senior years.

As a high school junior, he joined the football team for the first time and played free safety. His senior year, Levine moved to wide receiver and was chosen for the Minnesota All-State team. He graduated from HPHS in 1991, and had considered studying music at University of Rochester, Indiana University, University of North Texas and University of Wisconsin–Eau Claire, however he ultimately did not pursue a degree in music.

In football, Levine was recruited by several Division II and Division III schools, but did not receive any scholarship offers. However, he received a call from a Minnesota graduate assistant coach, Dave Spiegler, to invite him to walk-on as a receiver, which he accepted. Levine paid for his first two years at Minnesota independently. During the second game of the 1993 season against Indiana State, Levine started for injured teammate Omar Douglas. In that game, he caught seven passes for 121 yards and a touchdown. Head coach Jim Wacker then offered Levine a scholarship, and eventually made Levine a starter for the team in the 1994 and 1995 seasons. In his three years playing for the team, he was a two-time Academic All-Big Ten Team member.

Levine earned two master's degrees, one in physical education from Texas State in 1999 and one as an educational specialist in adult education from Auburn in 2003.

== Professional playing career ==
After finishing his career at Minnesota, Levine joined the Minnesota Fighting Pike of the Arena Football League. However, his professional career only lasted the 1996 season, as the team folded thereafter. In his season with the Fighting Pike, Levine caught 8 passes for 83 yards and 1 touchdown.

== Coaching career ==
=== Early coaching career ===
In 1996 Levine began his career as a coach, when he returned to his high school alma mater, Highland Park High School. He served as head coach of the freshmen team before he departed for a position at Texas State. During his time there, Levine rented an apartment at Pennington Funeral Home in Downtown San Marcos. His monthly salary was $976, and he did not own an automobile. Levine walked approximately one mile to campus each day. He simultaneously attended classes as a student, and earned his first master's degree in physical education from the university in 1999.

His next career move was to move to Auburn. Similar to his time spent at Texas State, Levine attended classes at the university, and eventually earned a degree at Auburn as an Educational specialist in adult education in 2003. He later held coaching positions at Louisiana Tech, Louisville and the NFL's Carolina Panthers.

=== Houston ===
Tony Levine was hired by Houston head coach Kevin Sumlin to be the special teams coordinator in 2008. During his time in this position, Houston achieved great success, and finished the 2011 season undefeated in regular season play.

He was named interim head football coach of the Cougars immediately after Sumlin left his team for Texas A&M; however, on December 21 — eleven days before the Cougars were due to play in the 2012 TicketCity Bowl — Houston dropped the "interim" from Levine's title and formally named him as the school's 12th head coach. The Cougars then defeated No. 22 Penn State in the TicketCity Bowl. Houston finished No. 14 in the Coaches Poll for 2011.

Levine was relieved after three seasons at Houston on December 8, 2014, with an overall record of 21–17, and three bowl appearances. On what seemed to be a promising year, the Cougars lost their inaugural game in TDECU Stadium to UTSA 27-7 – a disappointment compounded by the loss in the season opener to Texas State 30-13 two years prior.

=== Western Kentucky ===
Levine returned to coaching after sitting out the 2015 season, joining Jeff Brohm's staff at Western Kentucky as co-offensive coordinator, special teams coordinator and tight ends coach. WKU finished the 2016 season with an 11–3 record and ranked No. 23 in the nation as Conference USA Champions. WKU finished the season 1st nationally in scoring offense (45.5 points per game), 5th in total offense (523 yards per game) and 5th in passing offense (336 yards per game).

Levine was named the National Special Teams Coach of the Year by Phil Steele Magazine at the conclusion of the 2016 season.

=== Purdue ===
After Brohm was hired as the new head coach at Purdue after the 2016 season, he brought Levine along to fill the same roles he had at Western Kentucky, with the official announcement made on December 31. Levine announced his resignation after one season in January 2018, saying it was "the right time" to leave.

== After coaching ==
During Levine's hiatus from coaching in the 2015 season, he thought about a career change; as ESPN journalist Adam Rittenberg noted in a 2018 story, Levine wished "to still impact others while spending more time with his wife and four young children. And, ideally, not leave Houston." As part of this process, he called Eric Johnson, who had left the Iowa staff in 2014 to open a Culver's restaurant in the Nashville area, at Johnson's new restaurant, asking for advice. While he went back to coaching at that time, Levine eventually applied to become a Chick-fil-A franchisee, despite having had no restaurant experience. The company's franchisee selection process is notoriously selective—the company receives more than 50,000 annual franchise inquiries, but opens roughly 100 new locations each year. Nonetheless, the skills he practiced as a coach in leadership, recruiting, and player development transferred well to the company's selection process, and he was approved to open a new location five minutes' drive from his home.

While preparing to open his new restaurant, he went through about 700 job candidates before hiring 110 of them—which, by coincidence, is about the same size as a typical playing roster in Division I FBS. In Rittenberg's story, Levine said about his staff,

They're from age 15 to 65 and from every type of background, culture, race, religion. It reminded me of sitting in homes again when I was coaching. It's similar, the evaluation of team members and putting them in the right position. Who's more up for the fast pace, won't get rattled when there's cars wrapped around a restaurant, can handle the stress and intensity of the drive-through?

The new restaurant opened on May 17, 2018, with festivities lasting a week. Before the opening, Levine held a free lunch and dinner as what he called "a live simulation scrimmage" for his staff, and the festivities also included a dinner for Levine's former Houston players and assistants. In the Rittenberg story, he made a telling point about the difference between his past life in coaching and his current career, saying, "Yesterday, my cell phone did not ring one time. If you've been coaching at the college level, you're normally not able to say that, if ever."

== Head coaching record ==
Year	Team	Overall	Conference	Standing	Bowl/playoffs	Coaches^{#}	AP^{°}
Houston Cougars (Conference USA) (2011–2012)
2011	Houston	1–0 (Note: Levine coached the 2012 TicketCity Bowl after head coach Kevin Sumlin resigned with a 12–1 (8–0 C-USA) record.)			W TicketCity	14	18
2012	Houston	5–7	4–4	T–3rd (West)			
Houston Cougars (American Athletic Conference) (2013–2014)
2013	Houston	8–5	5–3	4th	L BBVA Compass		
2014	Houston	7–5	5–3	T–4th	Armed Forces (Note: David Gibbs coached the 2015 Armed Forces Bowl after Levine was fired.)		
Houston:		21–17	14–10				
Total:		21–17					
National championship Conference title Conference division title or championship game berth
