= 2014 Houston Cougars football team =

American college football season

2014 Houston Cougars football

Armed Forces Bowl champion

Armed Forces Bowl, W 35–34 vs. Pittsburgh
- Conference: American Athletic Conference
- Record: 8–5 (5–3 The American)
- Head coach: Tony Levine (3rd season; regular season); David Gibbs (interim; bowl game)
- Offensive coordinator: Travis Bush (1st season)
- Offensive scheme: Spread
- Defensive coordinator: David Gibbs (2nd season)
- Base defense: Multiple
- Home stadium: TDECU Stadium

2014 American Athletic Conference football standings
| | Conf. | | | Overall |
| Team | W | | L | W | | L |
|---|---|---|---|---|---|---|
| No. 25 Memphis + | 7 | – | 1 | 10 | – | 3 |
| Cincinnati + | 7 | – | 1 | 9 | – | 4 |
| UCF + | 7 | – | 1 | 9 | – | 4 |
| East Carolina | 5 | – | 3 | 8 | – | 5 |
| Houston | 5 | – | 3 | 8 | – | 5 |
| Temple | 4 | – | 4 | 6 | – | 6 |
| South Florida | 3 | – | 5 | 4 | – | 8 |
| Tulane | 2 | – | 6 | 3 | – | 9 |
| Tulsa | 2 | – | 6 | 2 | – | 10 |
| UConn | 1 | – | 7 | 2 | – | 10 |
| SMU | 1 | – | 7 | 1 | – | 11 |
+ – Conference co-champions; Rankings from AP Poll

The 2014 Houston Cougars football team represented the University of Houston in the 2014 NCAA Division I FBS football season. It was the 67th year of season play for Houston. The season was the second for the Cougars as a member of the American Athletic Conference and their first playing in their new stadium, TDECU Stadium in Houston. They finished the season 8–5, 5–3 in AAC play to finish in a tie for fourth place. They were invited to the Armed Forces Bowl where they defeated Pittsburgh.

On December 8, head coach Tony Levine was fired. He finished with a record of 21–17 in three seasons. Defensive coordinator David Gibbs led the Cougars in the Armed Forces Bowl.

== Schedule ==
| Date | Time | Opponent | Site | TV | Result | Attendance |
|---|---|---|---|---|---|---|
| August 29 | 8:00 p.m. | UTSA* | TDECU Stadium; Houston, TX | ESPNU | L 7–27 | 40,755 |
| September 6 | 7:00 p.m. | Grambling State* | TDECU Stadium; Houston, TX | ESPN3 | W 47–0 | 30,081 |
| September 11 | 8:00 p.m. | at No. 25 BYU* | LaVell Edwards Stadium; Provo, UT | ESPN | L 25–33 | 57,630 |
| September 20 | 7:00 p.m. | UNLV* | TDECU Stadium; Houston, TX | ESPN3 | W 47–14 | 23,408 |
| October 2 | 6:00 p.m. | UCF | TDECU Stadium; Houston, TX | ESPN | L 12–17 | 26,685 |
| October 11 | 6:00 p.m. | at Memphis | Liberty Bowl Memorial Stadium; Memphis, TN | CBSSN | W 28–24 | 32,784 |
| October 17 | 8:00 p.m. | Temple | TDECU Stadium; Houston, TX | ESPNU | W 31–10 | 21,471 |
| November 1 | 3:00 p.m. | at South Florida | Raymond James Stadium; Tampa, FL | ESPNews | W 27–3 | 29,782 |
| November 8 | 2:30 p.m. | Tulane^{†} | TDECU Stadium; Houston, TX | ESPNU | L 24–31 | 32,205 |
| November 22 | 2:00 p.m. | Tulsa | TDECU Stadium; Houston, TX | ESPN3 | W 38–28 | 23,572 |
| November 28 | 11:00 a.m. | at SMU | Gerald J. Ford Stadium; University Park, TX (rivalry) | CBSSN | W 35–9 | 15,446 |
| December 6 | 11:00 a.m. | at Cincinnati | Paul Brown Stadium; Cincinnati, OH | ESPN | L 31–38 | 24,606 |
| January 2 | 11:00 a.m. | vs. Pittsburgh* | Amon G. Carter Stadium; Fort Worth, TX (Armed Forces Bowl) | ESPN | W 35–34 | 37,888 |
*Non-conference game; ^{†}Homecoming; Rankings from AP Poll released prior to game; All times are in Central time

Schedule source:

== Game summaries ==
=== UTSA ===
UTSA at Houston

| Team | 1 | 2 | 3 | 4 | Total |
|---|---|---|---|---|---|
| • Roadrunners | 7 | 7 | 10 | 3 | 27 |
| Cougars | 0 | 0 | 0 | 7 | 7 |

- Date: August 29
- Location: TDECU Stadium
  Houston, TX
- Game start: 8:00 p.m. CST
- Elapsed time: 3:20
- Game attendance: 40,755
- Game weather: 79 °F (26 °C), Cloudy w/ 86% humidity, winds SE at 18 mph
- Referee: Rodney Burnette
- TV announcers (ESPNU): Mike Couzens and Charles Arbuckle

=== Grambling State ===
Grambling State at Houston

| Team | 1 | 2 | 3 | 4 | Total |
|---|---|---|---|---|---|
| Tigers | 0 | 0 | 0 | 0 | 0 |
| • Cougars | 10 | 24 | 6 | 7 | 47 |

- Date: September 6
- Location: TDECU Stadium
  Houston, TX
- Game start: 7:05 p.m. CST
- Elapsed time: 3:07
- Game attendance: 30,081
- Game weather: 83 °F (28 °C), Partly cloudy w/ 76% humidity, winds SSE at 6 mph
- Referee: Tracy Jones
- TV announcers (ESPN3): Brett Dolan and Pat Hill

=== BYU ===
Houston at BYU

| Team | 1 | 2 | 3 | 4 | Total |
|---|---|---|---|---|---|
| UH Cougars | 0 | 15 | 0 | 10 | 25 |
| • #25 BYU Cougars | 16 | 7 | 3 | 7 | 33 |

- Date: September 11
- Location: LaVell Edwards Stadium
  Provo, UT
- Game start: 7:01 p.m. MST
- Elapsed time: 3:21
- Game attendance: 57,630
- Game weather: 70 °F (21 °C), Clear w/ 34% humidity, winds NW at 5 mph
- Referee: Todd LaPenta
- TV announcers (ESPN/BYUtv): Rece Davis, Jesse Palmer, David Pollack, & Samantha Ponder (ESPN)
  Dave McCann, Blaine Fowler, Andy Boyce, & Lauren Francom (BYUtv)

=== UNLV ===
| | 1 | 2 | 3 | 4 | Total |
|---|---|---|---|---|---|
| Rebels | 7 | 0 | 7 | 0 | 14 |
| Cougars | 13 | 0 | 17 | 17 | 47 |

=== UCF ===
| | 1 | 2 | 3 | 4 | Total |
|---|---|---|---|---|---|
| Knights | 0 | 7 | 10 | 0 | 17 |
| Cougars | 3 | 3 | 0 | 6 | 12 |

=== Memphis ===
| | 1 | 2 | 3 | 4 | Total |
|---|---|---|---|---|---|
| Cougars | 0 | 14 | 7 | 7 | 28 |
| Tigers | 7 | 14 | 0 | 3 | 24 |

=== Temple ===
| | 1 | 2 | 3 | 4 | Total |
|---|---|---|---|---|---|
| Owls | 3 | 7 | 0 | 0 | 10 |
| Cougars | 10 | 7 | 14 | 0 | 31 |

=== South Florida ===
| | 1 | 2 | 3 | 4 | Total |
|---|---|---|---|---|---|
| Cougars | 7 | 0 | 7 | 13 | 27 |
| Bulls | 0 | 0 | 3 | 0 | 3 |

=== Tulane ===
| | 1 | 2 | 3 | 4 | Total |
|---|---|---|---|---|---|
| Green Wave | 7 | 7 | 7 | 10 | 31 |
| Cougars | 7 | 10 | 0 | 7 | 24 |

=== Tulsa ===
| | 1 | 2 | 3 | 4 | Total |
|---|---|---|---|---|---|
| Golden Hurricane | 0 | 7 | 14 | 7 | 28 |
| Cougars | 14 | 0 | 14 | 10 | 38 |

=== SMU ===
| | 1 | 2 | 3 | 4 | Total |
|---|---|---|---|---|---|
| Cougars | 7 | 0 | 21 | 7 | 35 |
| Mustangs | 0 | 9 | 0 | 0 | 9 |

=== Cincinnati ===
| | 1 | 2 | 3 | 4 | Total |
|---|---|---|---|---|---|
| Cougars | 7 | 3 | 7 | 14 | 31 |
| Bearcats | 7 | 14 | 14 | 3 | 38 |

=== Pittsburgh (Armed Forces Bowl) ===
| | 1 | 2 | 3 | 4 | Total |
|---|---|---|---|---|---|
| Cougars | 0 | 6 | 0 | 29 | 35 |
| Panthers | 0 | 17 | 7 | 10 | 34 |
