= David Gibbs (American football) =

American football player and coach (born 1968)

Current position
- Title: Safeties Coach
- Team: Arizona State
- Conference: Big 12

Biographical details
- Born: January 10, 1968 (age 58); Mount Airy, North Carolina, U.S.
- Education: Colorado

Playing career
- 1987–1990: Colorado
- Position: Defensive back

Coaching career (HC unless noted)
- 1991–1992: Oklahoma (GA)
- 1993–1994: Colorado (GA)
- 1995–1996: Kansas (DB)
- 1997–2000: Minnesota (DC)
- 2001: Denver Broncos (S)
- 2002–2004: Denver Broncos (DB)
- 2005: Auburn (DC)
- 2006–2008: Kansas City Chiefs (DB)
- 2009–2010: Houston Texans (DB)
- 2012: Virginia Destroyers (DB)
- 2013–2014: Houston (DC)
- 2014: Houston (interim HC)
- 2015–2018: Texas Tech (DC)
- 2019–2020: Missouri (DB)
- 2021–2023: UCF (S)
- 2023: UCF (co-DC/S)
- 2024-2025: Arizona State (Analyst)
- 2026-present: Arizona State (S)

Head coaching record
- Overall: 1–0
- Bowls: 1–0

David Alexander Gibbs (born January 10, 1968) is an American football coach and former player. Gibbs has previously served as the defensive coordinator at UCF, Texas Tech, Houston, Auburn, and Minnesota. He also has coached defensive backs in the NFL. Gibbs currently serves as the safeties coach at Arizona State. Prior to his promotion, he served as a defensive analyst for two seasons.

== Playing career ==
Gibbs began his playing career at Auburn High School, in Auburn, Alabama, while his father Alex Gibbs was offensive coordinator at nearby Auburn University. Gibbs went on to attend the University of Colorado, where he was a four-year letterman at defensive back from 1986 through 1990. He was named to the Academic All-Big Eight team as a senior, leading the Buffaloes to the 1990 national championship under coach Bill McCartney.

== Coaching career ==
After graduating from Colorado, Gibbs served as a graduate assistant at the University of Oklahoma and at Colorado. In 1995, he became the secondary coach at the University of Kansas under head coach Glen Mason. When Mason was appointed head coach at the University of Minnesota in 1997, Gibbs was hired as the Golden Gophers' defensive coordinator, the youngest coordinator in Division I-A at that time. Gibbs improved a Minnesota defense that had ranked last in the Big Ten Conference in 1996 to one that was ranked eighth in the nation in pass and scoring defense by 1999.

From 2001 through 2004, Gibbs coached defense for the Denver Broncos, which by 2003 was rated the fourth strongest defense in the NFL. In 2005, he returned to Auburn to be defensive coordinator for Auburn University, where his defense ranked sixth in the NCAA in scoring defense and led the Southeastern Conference (SEC) in sacks. Gibbs became defensive backs coach for the Kansas City Chiefs in 2006.

Gibbs was hired as defensive backs coach by the Houston Texans in January 2009. Following the 2010 season, the Texans fired him along with defensive coordinator Frank Bush. After a one-year hiatus from coaching, he spent 2012 coaching defensive backs for the Virginia Destroyers of the United Football League (UFL).

Gibbs accepted the position of defensive coordinator at the University of Houston on January 15, 2013. He resigned that position on January 5, 2015, after coaching the biggest winning fourth quarter comeback in bowl history at the 2015 Armed Forces Bowl with the score of 35–34. On January 5, 2015, Gibbs was hired for the same position at Texas Tech. He was Texas Tech's sixth defensive coordinator since 2009.

== Personal life ==
Gibbs is the son of Alex Gibbs, a veteran NFL assistant coach. His son, Hudson Gibbs, plays defensive back for the University of Central Florida (UCF).

== Head coaching record ==
Year	Team	Overall	Conference	Standing	Bowl/playoffs
Houston Cougars (American Athletic Conference) (2014)
2014	Houston	1–0 (Note: Gibbs coached the 2015 Armed Forces Bowl after head coach Tony Levine was fired after a 7–5 (5–3 The American) regular season.)			W Armed Forces
Houston:		1–0			
Total:		1–0			
