= 2015 Armed Forces Bowl (January) =

American college football game

2015 Lockheed Martin Armed Forces Bowl
- 12th Armed Forces Bowl
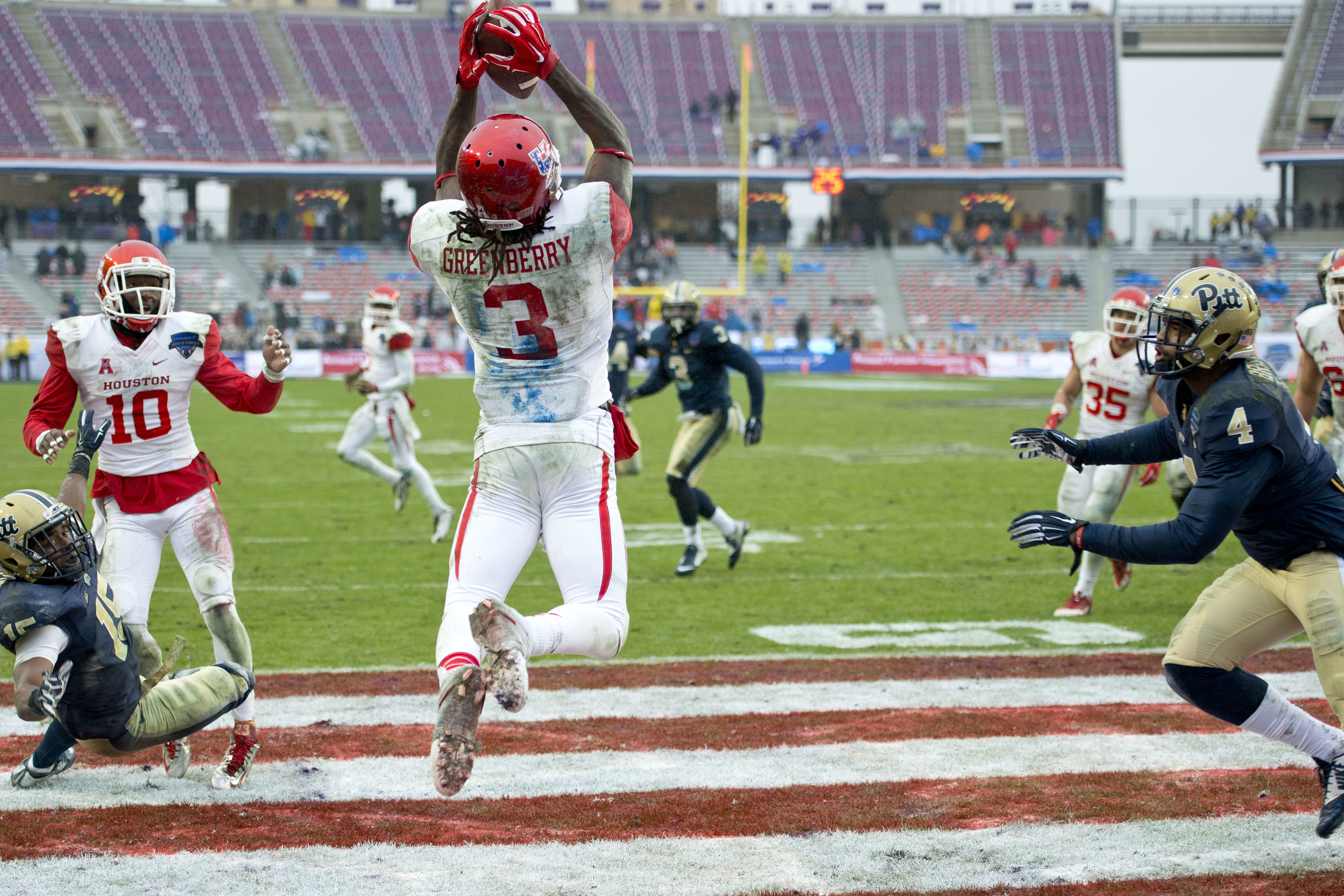
- Deontay Greenberry making the game-winning catch for Houston
Houston Cougars	Pittsburgh Panthers
(7–5)	(6–6)
The American	ACC
35	34
Head coach: David Gibbs (interim)	Head coach: Joe Rudolph (interim)
	1	2	3	4	Total
Houston	0	6	0	29	35
Pittsburgh	0	17	7	10	34
- Date: January 2, 2015
- Season: 2014
- Stadium: Amon G. Carter Stadium
- Location: Fort Worth, Texas
- MVP: Houston RB Kenneth Farrow
- Favorite: Pittsburgh by 5.5
- Referee: Brad Rogers (C-USA)
- Attendance: 37,888
- Payout: US$675,000

United States TV coverage
- Network: ESPN/RedVoice LLC
- Announcers: Tom Hart, Matt Stinchcomb, & Heather Mitts (ESPN); Brian Estridge, John Denton, Rob Best, & Landy Burdine (RedVoice LLC)

The 2015 Armed Forces Bowl was an American college football bowl game that was played on January 2, 2015, at Amon G. Carter Stadium on the campus of Texas Christian University in Fort Worth, Texas. The twelfth annual Armed Forces Bowl, it matched the Houston Cougars of the American Athletic Conference against the Pittsburgh Panthers of the Atlantic Coast Conference. The game began at 11:00 a.m. CST and aired on ESPN. It was one of the 2014–15 bowl games that concluded the 2014 FBS football season.

The bowl was the first to be named the Lockheed Martin Armed Forces Bowl for corporate sponsor Lockheed Martin.

With less than 11 minutes left on the game clock, Houston trailed Pittsburgh by 25 points, but the Cougars came back to win 35–34. It was the biggest fourth quarter comeback in bowl history.

== Teams ==
The game featured the Houston Cougars of the American Athletic Conference against the Pittsburgh Panthers of the Atlantic Coast Conference.

The 2015 Armed Forces Bowl was the third overall meeting between Houston and Pittsburgh, with the series tied 1–1 entering the game. The last time the two teams had met was in 1997.

=== Houston Cougars ===
After finishing their regular season with a 7–5 record, the Cougars accepted their invitation to play in the game.

The game was Houston's fourth Armed Forces Bowl, tying them with the Air Force Falcons for the most appearances in the game. The Cougars were 1–2 in the game before 2015, having lost the 2005 Fort Worth Bowl to the Kansas Jayhawks by a score of 42–13, then having won the 2008 game over the 2008 Air Force Falcons by a score of 34–28, and finally having lost the 2009 game once again to Air Force by a score of 47–20.

=== Pittsburgh Panthers ===
After finishing their regular season with a 6–6 record, the Panthers accepted their invitation to play in the game.

The game was Pittsburgh's first Armed Forces Bowl.

== Game summary ==
=== Scoring summary ===
Scoring summary

Quarter	Time	Drive			Team	Scoring information	Score	
Quarter	Time	Plays	Yards	TOP	Team	Scoring information	HOU	PITT
2	14:02	15	92	7:07	PITT	James Conner 1-yard touchdown run, Chris Blewitt kick good	0	7
2	5:40	15	76	6:03	HOU	Kenneth Farrow 2-yard touchdown run, Kyle Bullard kick blocked	6	7
2	1:27	9	70	4:06	PITT	Isaac Bennett 12-yard touchdown run, Chris Blewitt kick good	6	14
2	0:00	5	29	0:23	PITT	52-yard field goal by Chris Blewitt	6	17
3	5:10	13	91	6:35	PITT	J. P. Holtz 16-yard touchdown reception from Chad Voytik, Chris Blewitt kick good	6	24
4	13:58	11	62	5:12	PITT	James Conner 5-yard touchdown run, Chris Blewitt kick good	6	31
4	10:43	9	86	3:06	HOU	Kenneth Farrow 8-yard touchdown run, Kyle Bullard kick good	13	31
4	6:14	9	60	4:21	PITT	29-yard field goal by Chris Blewitt	13	34
4	3:41	6	83	2:26	HOU	Deontay Greenberry 8-yard touchdown reception from Greg Ward Jr., Kyle Bullard kick good	20	34
4	1:58	6	52	1:39	HOU	Demarcus Ayers 29-yard touchdown reception from Greg Ward Jr., Kyle Bullard kick good	27	34
4	0:59	4	57	0:56	HOU	Deontay Greenberry 25-yard touchdown reception from Greg Ward Jr., 2-point pass good	35	34
"TOP" = time of possession. For other American football terms, see Glossary of American football.							35	34

=== Statistics ===
Statistics	HOU	PITT
First downs	23	28
Plays–yards	65–486	77–449
Rushes–yards	40–212	41–227
Passing yards	274	222
Passing: Comp–Att–Int	15–25–0	18–36–0
Time of possession	26:17	33:43
