= 2014 BYU Cougars football team =

American college football season

2014 BYU Cougars football

Miami Beach Bowl, L 48–55 ^{2OT} vs. Memphis
- Conference: Independent
- Record: 8–5
- Head coach: Bronco Mendenhall (10th season)
- Offensive coordinator: Robert Anae (8th season)
- Offensive scheme: Air raid
- Defensive coordinator: Nick Howell (2nd season)
- Base defense: 3–4
- Captains: Taysom Hill; Paul Lasike; Craig Bills; Remington Peck
- Home stadium: LaVell Edwards Stadium

2014 NCAA Division I FBS independents football records
	Conf.			Overall
Team	W		L	W		L
BYU		–		8	–	5
Notre Dame		–		8	–	5
Navy		–		8	–	5
Army		–		4	–	8
Rankings from AP Poll

The 2014 BYU Cougars football team represented Brigham Young University in the 2014 NCAA Division I FBS football season. The Cougars, led by tenth head coach Bronco Mendenhall, played their home games at LaVell Edwards Stadium. This was the fourth year BYU competed as an independent. They finished the season 8–5. They were invited to the inaugural Miami Beach Bowl where they lost to Memphis.

== Before the season ==
After a season in which the entire offensive staff was changed, BYU is expected to have stability in the coaching ranks as every coach is expected to return.

=== 2014 Recruits ===
The Cougars have signed 17 high school seniors, 2 junior college transfers, and 2 FBS transfer for the 2014 class. A few members will be going straight out onto their LDS mission. Details on each signee will be added within the next couple of weeks. The class includes 12 defensive and eight offensive players representing seven different states with seven recruits signing out of California, four from Utah, three from Texas, two from both Arizona and Kansas, and one each from Alabama and North Carolina. On defense, BYU adds six recruits at defensive line, three at linebacker and three in the defensive backfield, while signing four wide receivers, three offensive linemen and one tight end on offense. BYU also has two mid-year enrollees that will bolster their ranks.

=== 2014 Returning Missionaries ===
18 return missionaries will join BYU for the 2014 season.

=== 2014 Departures ===
5 BYU players were invited to the 2014 NFL Scouting Combine and will not return as they are graduating seniors. The five feature two of BYU's all-time leaders in Kyle Van Noy and Cody Hoffman. Uani Unga, Eathyn Manumaleuna, and Daniel Sorensen round out the list of Cougars invited to the Combine. All five are expected to be taken in the 2014 NFL draft. Only 13 programs had more than BYU's 5-players invited to the Combine, and out of those 13 only 3 had more than BYU's defense: Alabama, Florida State, and Florida.

Name	Number	Pos.	Height	Weight	Year	Hometown	Notes
Jason Munns	11	QB	6'5"	249	Senior	Kennewick, WA	Graduated
Kaneakua Friel	82	TE	6'5"	261	Senior	Kaneohe, HI	Graduated
JD Falslev	12	WR	5'8"	175	Senior	Smithfield, UT	Graduated
Cody Hoffman	2	WR	6'4"	210	Senior	Crescent City, CA	Graduated
Skyler Ridley	17	WR	6'0"	172	Senior	Murrieta, CA	Graduated
Manaaki Vaitai	79	OL	6'3"	317	Senior	Euless, TX	Graduated
Mike Hague	32	DB	5'10"	190	Senior	Salt Lake City, UT	Graduated
Adam Hogan	16	DB	5'11"	180	Senior	Los Angeles, CA	Graduated
Scott Lefrandt	33	DB	5'11"	190	Senior	Seattle, WA	Graduated
Blake Morgan	27	DB	5'11"	195	Senior	Greeley, CO	Graduated
Daniel Sorensen	9	DB	6'2"	208	Senior	Colton, CA	Graduated
Eathyn Manumaleuna	55	DL	6'2"	305	Senior	Anchorage, AK	Graduated
Tyler Beck	45	LB	6'1"	220	Senior	Murrieta, CA	Graduated
Spencer Hadley	34	LB	6'1"	227	Senior	Connell, WA	Graduated
Austin Jorgensen	34	LB	6'2"	232	Senior	Mount Pleasant, UT	Graduated
Uani Unga	41	LB	6'1"	317	Senior	Rancho Cucamonga, CA	Graduated
Kyle Van Noy	3	LB	6'3"	245	Senior	Reno, NV	Graduated; Selected in 2014 NFL draft by Detroit Lions with 40th pick
Justin Sorensen	37	K	6'1"	243	Senior	South Jordan, UT	Graduated
Kevin O'Mary	96	DS	6'4"	240	Senior	San Diego, CA	Graduated
Tanner Cox	96	LB	6'4"	226	Junior	Pleasant View, UT	Graduated
Andrew Crawford	68	OL	6'5"	222	Sophomore	Fairfax, VA	
Tui Crichton	52	OL	6'3"	343	Junior	Provo, UT	
Michael Doman	93	DL	6'4"	240	Sophomore	Portland, OR	Transferred to Portland State
Cole Jones	65	OL	6'6"	282	Sophomore	Centerville, UT	
Benson Manwaring	31	WR	5'5"	180	Junior	Boise, ID	
Ammon Olsen	15	QB	6'3"	209	Sophomore	Draper, UT	Transferred to Southern Utah
Rylee Gautavai	46	LB	6'0"	219	Freshman	Bountiful, UT	LDS mission (returning in 2016)
Porter Hansen	38	LB	6'3"	205	Freshman	La Crescenta, CA	LDS mission (returning in 2016)
Trajan Pili	47	LB	6'1"	225	Freshman	Las Vegas, NV	LDS mission (returning in 2016)
Addison Pulsipher	71	OL	6'5"	264	Freshman	Temecula, CA	LDS mission (returning in 2016)
Thomas Shoaf	56	OL	6'7"	255	Freshman	Columbus, IN	LDS mission (returning in 2016)
Nephi Stevens	22	WR	5'11"	190	Freshman	Aiea, HI	LDS mission (returning in 2016)
Merrill Taliauli	46	DL	6'2"	312	Freshman	Salt Lake City, UT	LDS mission (returning in 2016)
Iona Pritchard	5	RB	6'0"	232	RS Junior	South Jordan, UT	Graduate Transfer to Oregon State
Billy Green	10	QB	6'2"	206	Sophomore	Woodway, WA	Transferred
JonRyheem Peoples	94	DL	6'4"	339	RS Freshman	Rigby, ID	Transferred to Idaho State

== Media ==
=== Football Media Day ===
Football Media Day took place on Monday, June 23rd of 2014 and aired live on BYUtv, having player interviews conducted through byutvsports.com.

=== Cougar IMG Sports Network Affiliates ===
KSL 102.7 FM and 1160 AM- Flagship Station (Salt Lake City/ Provo, UT and ksl.com)
BYU Radio- Nationwide (Dish Network 980, Sirius XM 143, and byuradio.org)
KIDO- Boise, ID [football only]
KTHK- Blackfoot/ Idaho Falls/ Pocatello/ Rexburg, ID
KMGR- Manti, UT
KSUB- Cedar City, UT
KDXU- St. George, UT
KSHP- Las Vegas, NV [football only]
BYUCougars.com

== Roster ==
2014 BYU Cougars football team roster
Players
Coaches
Offense

Pos.	#	Name	Class
QB	2	Hunter Moore	Fr
QB	4	Taysom Hill (injured) (C)	Jr
QB	7	Christian Stewart	Sr
QB	10	McCoy Hill	Fr
QB	15	Hayden Griffits	Fr
RB	21	Jamaal Williams (injured)	Jr
RB	24	Algie Brown	So
RB	26	Nate Carter	Jr
RB	28	Adam Hine (injured)	So
RB	32	Peter Welsh	Fr
RB	33	Paul Lasike (C)	Sr
RB	34	AJ Moore	So
RB	36	Joshua Whippy	So
TE	17	Colby Jorgensen	Fr
TE	80	Matt Sumsion	Fr
TE	84	Devin Mahina	Sr
TE	85	Bryan Sampson	So
WR	1	Ross Apo	Sr
WR	3	Colby Pearson	So
WR	5	Nick Kurtz	Jr
WR	9	Jordan Leslie (injured)	Sr
WR	10	Mitch Mathews	Jr
WR	11	Terenn Houk (injured)	Jr
WR	13	Kurt Henderson	Jr
WR	18	David Kessler	Sr
WR	19	Keanu Nelson	Jr
WR	82	Jake Ziolkowski	So
WR	82	Travis Frey	So
WR	83	David Kessler	So
WR	86	Trey Dye	Fr
WR	86	Chase Frei	Jr
WR	87	Mitchell Juergens	So
OL	50	Edward Fusi	Sr
OL	54	Parker Dawe	So
OL	55	Brayden Kearsley (injured)	So
OL	56	Tejan Koroma	Fr
OL	57	De'Ondre Wesley (injured)	Sr
OL	58	Chase Larson	Jr
OL	61	Quinn Lawlor	Sr
OL	66	Manu Mulitalo	So
OL	67	Kyle Johnson	So
OL	68	Brian Rawlinson	Fr
OL	70	Terrance Alletto	Jr
OL	71	Ului Lapuaho	Fr
OL	72	Ryker Mathews	Jr
OL	73	Solomone Kafu	Sr
OL	74	Brock Stringham	Sr
OL	78	Tuni Kanuch	Fr
OL	75	Brad Wilcox	So
OL	77	Michael Yeck	Sr

Defense

Pos.	#	Name	Class
DB	1	Harvey Jackson	Sr
DB	1	Sam Lee	Jr
DB	2	Dallin Leavitt (injured)	So
DB	4	Robertson Daniel	Sr
DB	6	Jordan Johnson (injured)	Sr
DB	7	Skye PoVey	Sr
DB	11	Jordan Preator	Fr
DB	12	Kai Nacua	So
DB	13	Trent Trammell	Jr
DB	15	Michael Davis	So
DB	16	Michael Shelton	Fr
DB	17	Chris Badger	So
DB	20	Craig Bills (injured) (C)	Sr
DB	23	Garrett Juergens	So
DB	30	Michael Wadsworth	Jr
DB	35	Kavika Fonua	Fr
DB	37	Grant Jones	Fr
DL	44	Remington Peck (C)	Jr
DL	48	Tomasi Laulile	So
DL	62	Logan Taele	So
DL	76	Kamalani Kaluhiokalani	Fr
DL	89	Steven Richards	Fr
DL	91	Travis Tuiloma	Fr
DL	92	Graham Rowley	Jr
DL	93	Josh Carter	Sr
DL	94	Kesni Tausinga	Fr
DL	95	Bracken El-Bakri	Fr
DL	95	Jaterrius Gulley	Fr
DL	96	Adam Ingersoll	So
DL	97	Theodore King	So
DL	99	Marques Johnson	Sr
LB	5	Alani Fua (injured)	Sr
LB	22	Manoa Pikula	Jr
LB	25	Teu Kautai	Jr
LB	31	Sae Tautu	So
LB	34	Fred Warner	Fr
LB	36	Troy Hinds	Fr
LB	39	Phillip Amone	Fr
LB	41	Austin Heder	So
LB	42	Michael Alisa (injured)	Sr
LB	43	Jherremya Leuta-Douyere	Jr
LB	45	Toloa'i Ho Ching	Fr
LB	46	Harvey Langi	So
LB	47	Zac Stout	Sr
LB	49	Jordan Egbert	So
LB	50	DJ Doman	So
LB	51	Va'a Niumatalolo	Fr
LB	53	Sione Takitaki	Fr
LB	88	Tyler Cook	Fr
LB	90	Bronson Kaufusi	Jr

Special teams

Pos.	#	Name	Class
P	23	Scott Arellano	Sr
P	28	Jordan Miller	Jr
P	39	Chasen Brown	Fr
K	27	Trevor Samson	Sr
K	29	Andrew Mikkelsen	Fr
K	38	Vance "Moose" Bingham	So

Head coach

- Bronco Mendenhall (Oregon State)

Coordinators/assistant coaches

- Robert Anae (BYU)
  Offensive coordinator, offensive line, assistant head coach
- Mark Atuaia (BYU)
  Running backs
- Garett Tujague (BYU)
  Offensive line
- Jason Beck (BYU)
  Quarterbacks
- Guy Holliday (Cheyney)
  Outside wide receivers
- Nick Howell (Weber State)
  Secondary, defensive coorindator
- Steve Kaufusi (BYU)
  Defensive line
- Kelly Poppinga (BYU)
  Outside linebackers, special teams
- Paul Tidwell (Utah State)
  Inside linebackers
- Jay Omer (Auburn)
  Strength & conditioning
- Zach Nyborg (BYU)
  Director of football operations
- Patrick Hickman (Boise State)
  Football H. S. relations coordinator
- Geoff Martzen (Fresno State)
  Football player personnel & on-campus recruiting coordinator

Legend

- (C) Team captain
- (S) Suspended
- (I) Ineligible
- Injured
- Redshirt

Roster

== Schedule ==
Date	Time	Opponent	Rank	Site	TV	Result	Attendance	Source
August 29	5:00 p.m.	at UConn		Rentschler Field; East Hartford, CT	ESPN	W 35–10	35,150	
September 6	5:30 p.m.	at Texas		Darrell K Royal–Texas Memorial Stadium; Austin, TX	FS1	W 41–7	93,463	
September 11	7:00 p.m.	Houston	No. 25	LaVell Edwards Stadium; Provo, UT	ESPN	W 33–25	57,630	
September 20	1:30 p.m.	Virginia	No. 21	LaVell Edwards Stadium; Provo, UT	ESPN	W 41–33	59,023	
October 3	8:15 p.m.	Utah State	No. 18	LaVell Edwards Stadium; Provo, UT (rivalry)	ESPN	L 20–35	64,090	
October 9	5:30 p.m.	at UCF		Bright House Networks Stadium; Orlando, FL	ESPN	L 24–31 ^{OT}	41,547	
October 18	8:15 p.m.	Nevada		LaVell Edwards Stadium; Provo, UT	ESPN2	L 35–42	56,355	
October 24	7:00 p.m.	at Boise State		Albertsons Stadium; Boise, ID	ESPN	L 30–55	36,752	
November 1	1:30 p.m.	at Middle Tennessee		Johnny "Red" Floyd Stadium; Murfreesboro, TN	CBSSN	W 27–7	18,952	
November 15	5:00 p.m.	UNLV		LaVell Edwards Stadium; Provo, UT	ESPNU	W 42–23	53,622	
November 22	1:00 p.m.	Savannah State		LaVell Edwards Stadium; Provo, UT	BYUtv	W 64–0	52,123	
November 29	2:30 p.m.	at California		California Memorial Stadium; Berkeley, CA	P12N	W 42–35	47,856	
December 22	12:00 p.m.	vs. Memphis		Marlins Park; Miami, FL (Miami Beach Bowl)	ESPN	L 48–55 ^{2OT}	20,761	
Rankings from AP Poll released prior to the game; All times are in Mountain time

== Game summaries ==
=== UConn ===
BYU at UConn

Team	1	2	3	4	Total
• Cougars	14	14	0	7	35
Huskies	0	7	0	3	10

- Date: August 29
- Location: The Rent
  East Hartford, CT
- Game start: 7:02 p.m. EST
- Elapsed time: 3:29
- Game attendance: 35,150
- Game weather: 75 °F (24 °C), Clear and mild, winds S at 7mph
- Referee: Tracy Jones
- TV announcers (ESPN): Dave Flemming, Danny Kanell, & Allison Williams

Uniform combination: white helmet, white jersey, blue pants. For the second consecutive season BYU opened up on the East Coast. This time they came not in a white-out fashion. Instead they came with a mixed white and blue uniform, and the lack of rainy conditions allowed BYU to strike early and often in the running game.

BYU would rush for 205 yards and two touchdowns, while Taysom Hill would complete nearly 80% of his passes for 308 yards. While BYU sat out many players due to suspensions, including top Running back Jamaal Williams, BYU's defense kept UConn in must pass situations as they limited UConn's rushing game to 94 yards on31 carries, an average of 2.3 per play.

BYU would walk away with a 1–0 start, but they would also walk away with 2 of the 3 FBS Independent player of the week awards. Taysom Hill would take his first FBS Offensive Player of the Week award, and Bronson Kaufusi would take the FBS Defensive Player of the Week award.

Scoring summary

Quarter	Time	Drive			Team	Scoring information	Score	
Quarter	Time	Plays	Yards	TOP	Team	Scoring information	BYU	UConn
1	9:56	15	75	5:04	BYU	Taysom Hill 7-yard touchdown run, Trevor Samson kick good	7	0
1	9:35	1	26	0:06	BYU	Mitch Mathews 26-yard touchdown reception from Taysom Hill, Trevor Samson kick good	14	0
2	9:13	5	46	1:21	BYU	Adam Hine 7-yard touchdown reception from Taysom Hill, Trevor Samson kick good	21	0
2	2:33	6	52	2:16	UConn	Josh Mariner 1-yard touchdown run, Bobby Puyol kick good	21	7
2	1:03	5	69	1:30	BYU	Terenn Houck 35-yard touchdown reception from Taysom Hill, Trevor Samson kick good	28	7
4	11:48	10	37	3:58	UConn	35-yard field goal by Bobby Puyol	28	10
4	4:06	6	90	1:35	BYU	Taysom Hill 26-yard touchdown run, Trevor Samson kick good	35	10
"TOP" = time of possession. For other American football terms, see Glossary of American football.							35	10

Game Stats:

- Passing: BYU, Taysom Hill 28-36-0-308; UConn, Casey Cochran 17-31-1-171, Chandler Whitmer 8-17-0-113.
- Rushing: BYU, Hill 12–98–2, Paul Lasike 9–49, Algernon Brown 6–35, Adam Hine 6–15, Mitchell Juergens 1–5, Nate Carter 3–4; UConn, Max Delorenzo 9–40, Josh Marriner 9–28–1, Arkeel Newsome 3–10, Ron Johnson 3–9, Blake Feagles 1–6, Cochran 1-(−6), Whitmer 5-(−13).
- Receiving: BYU, Mitch Mathews 5–62–1, Terenn Houk 4–58–1, Colby Pearson 3–47, Brown 4–44, Adam hine 3–25, Lasike 4–23, Jordan Leslie 2–22, Mitchell Huergens 2–19, Devin Mahina 1–8; UConn, Geremy Davis 7–96, Kamal Abrams 3–38, Sean Mcquillan 3–33, Alec Bloom 2–24, Noel Thomas 2–18, Newsome 1–18, Marriner 1–17, Johnson 1–11, Deshon Foxx 2–8, Jazzmar Clax 1–3, Tommy Myers 1–3.
- Interceptions: BYU, Craig Bills 1–0.

=== Texas ===
BYU at Texas

Team	1	2	3	4	Total
• Cougars	3	3	28	7	41
#NR/25 Longhorns	0	0	7	0	7

- Date: September 6
- Location: Darrell K Royal–Texas Memorial Stadium
  Austin, TX
- Game start: 6:36 p.m. CST
- Elapsed time: 3:18
- Game attendance: 93,463
- Game weather: 95 °F (35 °C), Sunny w/ 39% humidity, winds SE at 9mph
- Referee: Mike Defee
- TV announcers (FS1/ESPN Radio): Joe Davis, Joey Harrington, & Kris Budden/Bill Rosinski, David Norrie, & Joe Schad

Uniform combination: white helmet, white jersey, blue pants. Texas quarterback Tyrone Swoopes got his first collegiate start for the injured David Ash, who would later retire from collegiate football, and a lot of short passes allowed him to walk away with a high passing percentage. While Texas found itself unable to score often offensively, the defense pestered BYU and kept the game close until the third quarter.

BYU took the ball to open the third quarter and drove for a touchdown. Texas turnovers and an inability to stop BYU in the third turned a close game into a blowout. BYU converted four possessions into four touchdowns ad turned a 6–0 game into 34–0 before Texas was finally able to score.

The highlight of the night came in the third when Taysom Hill took off for a 30-yard touchdown run with a little over 12 minutes remaining in the third. During the run he leaped six feet in the air over one Texas defender. The highlight placed Hill on many people's Heisman watch list and caused Cougar fans to start calling Taysom Taysman.

The Cougars third quarter performance turned what had been a lackluster performance into a blowout and was enough to give Taysom Hill his second consecutive FBS Independent Offisive Player of the Week award. Meanwhile, many Texas fans started claiming they never wanted to see BYU on their schedule again. BYU improved to 4–1 vs. Texas and 6–1 vs. Texas & Oklahoma lifetime with their second consecutive blowout.

Scoring summary

Quarter	Time	Drive			Team	Scoring information	Score	
Quarter	Time	Plays	Yards	TOP	Team	Scoring information	BYU	UT
1	3:30	8	71	2:54	BYU	21-yard field goal by Trevor Samson	3	0
2	6:34	6	12	2:16	BYU	29-yard field goal by Trevor Samson	6	0
3	12:06	9	75	2:54	BYU	Taysom Hill 30-yard touchdown run, Trevor Samson kick good	13	0
3	9:22	5	55	1:09	BYU	Adam Hine 16-yard touchdown run, Trevor Samson kick good	20	0
3	5:51	7	29	2:21	BYU	Taysom Hill 2-yard touchdown run, Trevor Samson kick good	27	0
3	4:33	4	24	1:08	BYU	Taysom Hill 1-yard touchdown run, Trevor Samson kick good	34	0
3	0:29	13	75	4:04	Texas	John Harris 13-yard touchdown reception from Tyrone Swoopes, Nick Rose kick good	34	7
4	8:05	9	45	3:35	BYU	Adam Hine 8-yard touchdown run, Trevor Samson kick good	41	7
"TOP" = time of possession. For other American football terms, see Glossary of American football.							41	7

Game Stats:

- Passing: BYU, Taysom Hill 18-27-1-181; UT, Tyrone Swoopes 20-31-1-176.
- Rushing: BYU, Hill 24–99–3, Jamaal Williams 19–89, Adam Hine 4–29–2, Algernon Brown 6–29, Nate Carter 2–4, Paul Lasike 1–2; UT, Johnathan Gray 14–47, Malcolm Brown 14–28, Swoopes 7–7.
- Receiving: BYU, Jordan Leslie 7–85, Brown 4–40, Mitch Mathews 4–24, Terenn Houk 1–14, Williams 1–12, Devin Mahine 1–6; UT, John Harris 8–77–1, Jaxon Shipley 5–36, Lorenzo Joe 1–22, Marcus Johnson 2–20, Geoff Swaim 2–14, Gray 1–5, Brown 1–2.
- Interceptions: BYU, Michael Alisa 1–30; UT, Quandre Diggs 1–0.

=== Houston ===
Houston at BYU

Team	1	2	3	4	Total
UH Cougars	0	15	0	10	25
• #25/NR BYU Cougars	16	7	3	7	33

- Date: September 11
- Location: LaVell Edwards Stadium
  Provo, UT
- Game start: 7:01 p.m. MST
- Elapsed time: 3:21
- Game attendance: 57,630
- Game weather: 70 °F (21 °C), Clear w/ 34% humidity, winds NW at 5 mph
- Referee: Todd LaPenta
- TV announcers (ESPN/BYUtv): Rece Davis, Jesse Palmer, David Pollack, & Samantha Ponder/Dave McCann, Blaine Fowler, Andy Boyce, & Lauren Francom

Uniform combination: white helmet with stars and stripes, blue jersey, white pants. On 9/11 both BYU and Houston came out with patriotic helmets, and BYU decorated the field with patriotic symbols to remind everyone we never forget what happened on 9–11. The decorations served only as a small distraction as a game was to take place.

BYU and Houston both swapped quarters in terms of offensive efficiency. For the game BYU owned most statistical categories. However Houston was able to keep it close due to turnovers. Houston forced 3 turnovers which they converted into 17 points, 14 of which came in the second quarter and turned a 23–0 game into 23–15 as time expired in the first half.

BYU countered by opening the game with a defensive safety on Houston's first possession. In addition to the turnovers, personal fouls kept a lot of Houston drives alive. BYU committed 11 penalties for 98 yards.

The close game led a lot of people to speculate BYU wasn't truly a top 25 team. However some of the doubters were silenced when Taysom Hill was awarded his third consecutive FBS Independents Offensive player of the week award.

Scoring summary

Quarter	Time	Drive			Team	Scoring information	Score	
Quarter	Time	Plays	Yards	TOP	Team	Scoring information	Houston	BYU
1	10:37				BYU	John O'Korn tackled in end zone for a safety by Zac Stout	0	2
1	9:12	5	64	1:17	BYU	Jamaal Williams 11-yard touchdown run, Trevor Samson kick good	0	9
1	3:24	8	70	2:43	BYU	Taysom Hill 5-yard touchdown run, Trevor Samson kick good	0	16
2	8:57	16	88	5:23	BYU	Mitch Mathews 5-yard touchdown reception from Taysom Hill, Trevor Samson kick good	0	23
2	3:12	17	82	4:23	Houston	29-yard field goal by Kyle Bullard	3	23
2	1:17	6	29	1:41	Houston	Deontay Greenbery 7-yard touchdown reception from John O'Korn, Kyle Bullard kick failed	9	23
2	0:00	1	45	0:03	Houston	Daniel Spencer 45-yard touchdown reception from John O'Korn, Kyle Bullard kick failed	15	23
3	0:51	15	53	6:15	BYU	26-yard field goal by Trevor Samson	15	26
4	11:47	8	56	2:50	BYU	Jamaal Williams 2-yard touchdown run, Trevor Samson kick good	15	33
4	9:09	7	68	2:31	Houston	Deontay Greenbery 15-yard touchdown reception from John O'Korn, Kyle Bullard kick good	22	33
4	7:18	4	8	0:56	Houston	36-yard field goal by Kyle Bullard	25	33
"TOP" = time of possession. For other American football terms, see Glossary of American football.							25	33

Game Stats:

- Passing: UH, John O'Korn 30-52-0-307, Greg Ward Jr. 1–1–0–8; BYU, Taysom Hill 21-34-2-200.
- Rushing: UH, Kenneth Farrow 3–7, O'Korn 6–4, Ward 1–0, Ryan Jackson 3-(−1); BYU, Taysom Hill 26–160–1, Jamaal Williams 28–139–2, Paul Lasike 3–21, Adam Hine 3–7, Scott Arellano 1-(−1).
- Receiving: UH, Daniel Spencer 10–133–1, Deontay Greenberry 6–74–2, Kenneth Farrow 5–25, Markeith Ambles 3–32, Ward 3–24, Demarcus Ayers 1–14, Wayne Beadle 1–9, Jackson 2–4; BYU, Jordan Leslie 6–79, Mitchell Juergens 1–38, Mitch Mathews 4–22–1, Devin Mahina 1–16, Kurt Henderson 1–11, Williams 1–9, Lasike 2–8, Terenn Houk 1–7, Adam Hine 1–5, Trey Dye 2–4, Devon Blackmon 1–1.
- Interceptions: UH, Joey Mbu 1–0, Trevon Stewart 1–0.

=== Virginia ===
Virginia at BYU

Team	1	2	3	4	Total
Cavaliers	7	9	0	17	33
• #21/23 Cougars	3	10	14	14	41

- Date: September 20
- Location: LaVell Edwards Stadium
  Provo, UT
- Game start: 1:35 p.m. MST
- Elapsed time: 3:40
- Game attendance: 59,023
- Game weather: 73 °F (23 °C), Sunny & Clear, winds N at 6mph
- Referee: Jerry Magallane
- TV announcers (ESPN/BYUtv): Bob Wischusen, Matt Millen, & Quint Kessenich/Dave McCann, Blaine Fowler, Andy Boyce, & Lauren Francom

Uniform combination: white helmet, white jersey, white pants. Virginia entered the game leading the nation in forcing turnovers. They were unable to take the ball once from BYU. However, the Cavaliers were able to limit BYU's offensive possessions. The Cavaliers doubled up BYU in almost every statistical category.

Virginia ran 102 plays to BYU's 60, held the ball 41 minutes to BYU's 19, and outgained BYU 519 yards to 332. However BYU was able to score on virtually every possession they had, and a 99-yard punt return from Adam Hine proved to be the backbreaker for the Cavaliers as BYU improved to 4–0.

For the fourth consecutive week Taysom Hill walked away with the FBS Independents offensive player of the week award, and Scott Arellano, who was awarded the game MVP thanks to his punts of 60+ yards, walked away with the FBS Independents special teams player of the week award.

Scoring summary

Quarter	Time	Drive			Team	Scoring information	Score	
Quarter	Time	Plays	Yards	TOP	Team	Scoring information	UVA	BYU
1	13:54	3	53	1:06	Virginia	Greyson Lambert 1-yard touchdown run, Ian Frye kick good	7	0
1	5:10	10	66	3:00	BYU	28-yard field goal by Trevor Samson	7	3
2	14:55	12	69	5:15	Virginia	23-yard field goal by Ian Frye	10	3
2	13:48	5	75	1:07	BYU	Jordan Leslie 8-yard touchdown reception from Taysom Hill, Trevor Samson kick good	10	10
2	14:55	10	39	4:05	Virginia	41-yard field goal by Ian Frye	13	10
2	4:39	4	4	1:00	BYU	37-yard field goal by Trevor Samson	13	13
2	0:00	7	49	1:43	Virginia	22-yard field goal by Ian Frye	16	13
3	9:02	7	49	1:43	BYU	Taysom Hill 15-yard touchdown run, Trevor Samson kick good	16	20
3	2:23	10	73	2:05	BYU	Jamaal Williams 2-yard touchdown run, Trevor Samson kick good	16	27
4	12:14	12	46	5:09	Virginia	46-yard field goal by Ian Frye	19	27
4	10:17	6	66	1:49	BYU	Mitch Juergens 50-yard touchdown reception from Taysom Hill, Trevor Samson kick good	19	34
4	8:06	9	75	2:11	Virginia	Khalek Shepherd 9-yard touchdown run, Ian Frye kick good	26	34
4	7:50				BYU	Adam Hine 99-yard kickoff return for a touchdown, Trevor Samson kick good	26	41
4	1:48	13	98	3:33	Virginia	Kyle Dockins 11-yard touchdown reception from Matt Johns, Ian Frye kick good	33	41
"TOP" = time of possession. For other American football terms, see Glossary of American football.							33	41

Game Stats:

- Passing: VA, Greyson Lambert 21-35-1-188, Matt Johns 14-23-0-139; BYU, Taysom Hill 13-23-0-187.
- Rushing: VA, Khalek Shepherd 14–73–1, Lambert 5–49–1, Kevin Parks 11–24, Johns 3–22, Taquan Mizzell 8–17, Darius Jennings 3–11; BYU, Hill 17–72–1, Jamaal Williams 13–68–1, Paul Lasike 2–5, Mitchell Juergens 1–3, Adam Hine 1–0, TEAM 3-(−3).
- Receiving: VA, Miles Gooch 6–65, Parks 6–33, Canaan Severin 4–58, Andre Levrone 3–46, Doni Dowling 4–36, Jennings 3–35, Keeon Johnson 3–21, Kyle Dockins 1–11, Mizzell 2–10, Rob Burns 1–8, Shepherd 2–4; BYU, Devon Blackmon 2–55, Mitch Juergens 2–53–1, Jordan Leslie 4–41–1, Mitch Mathews 3–26, Terenn Houk 1–8, Devin Mahina 1–4.
- Interceptions: BYU, Robertson Daniels 1–32.

=== Utah State ===
Utah State at BYU

Team	1	2	3	4	Total
• Aggies	7	21	7	0	35
#18/19 Cougars	7	7	3	3	20

- Date: October 3
- Location: LaVell Edwards Stadium
  Provo, UT
- Game start: 8:26 p.m. MST
- Elapsed time: 3:31
- Game attendance: 64,090
- Game weather: 54 °F (12 °C), Clear, winds NW at 6mph
- Referee: Rick Loumiet
- TV announcers (ESPN/BYUtv): Dave Flemming, Mike Bellotti, & Allison Williams/Dave McCann, Blaine Fowler, Andy Boyce, & Lauren Francom

Uniform combination: white helmet with royal blue decals and royal blue chromium facemasks, royal blue jersey, royal blue pants. With no Utah on the schedule, BYU choose the Utah State game to break out the royal blue uniforms. The day also featured the retirement of Jim McMahon's #9 into the Cougar Ring of Fame, making BYU's WR Jordan Leslie the last Cougar to wear the coveted number.

The night began with two pass completions from Taysom Hill to Jordan Leslie totaling 57 yards, setting up a 7-yard run touchdown run from Taysom Hill. Utah State countered by converting linebacker Nick Vigil into a running back. Nick used strong runs around the outside to continually move the ball into BYU territory and give Utah State the short field. Meanwhile, Darrell Garretson completed a QB rating above 230 as Utah State used long, sustained offensive drives to limit BYU's possessions.

A Jamaal Williams fumble in the second quarter allowed the Aggies to take a 21–14 lead. The fumble was the first lost fumble for Williams collegiate career. The fumble began a series of bad stretches for BYU as on the next possession Taysom Hill suffered what appeared to be a fractured leg. Hill was carted off the field and placed in an air cast. Early prognosis stated that is might be season ending, but additional details would be released Monday after X-Rays and an MRI were performed. Backup quarterback Christian Stewart came in to try and rally the BYU cause, but 3 interceptions allowed the Aggies to utilize a short field and ruin any real chances BYU had of coming back.

The loss to Utah State proved to be the first home loss for BYU against the Aggies since 1976. It ended any chances BYU had of making a New Years Six bowl and likely ended any Heisman Campaign Hill was to possibly have. Ironically enough, the last time BYU had lost to the Aggies at home was when Jim McMahon was a QB for BYU.

The loss returned the Wagon Wheel to Logan and allowed Utah State to walk away with the 2014 Beehive Boot, as neither team plays Utah this season.

Scoring summary

Quarter	Time	Drive			Team	Scoring information	Score	
Quarter	Time	Plays	Yards	TOP	Team	Scoring information	Utah State	BYU
1	13:44	5	75	1:16	BYU	Taysom Hill 11-yard touchdown run, Trevor Samson kick good	0	7
1	0:50	10	85	4:33	Utah State	Devon Robinson 7-yard touchdown reception from Darrell Garretson, Nick Diaz kick good	7	7
2	13:06	9	75	2:44	BYU	Mitch Mathews 25-yard touchdown reception from Taysom Hill, Trevor Samson kick good	7	14
2	4:40	13	88	8:20	Utah State	Darrell Garretson 5-yard touchdown run, Nick Diaz kick good	14	14
2	4:27	1	22	0:07	Utah State	Devon Robinson 22-yard touchdown reception from Darrell Garretson, Nick Diaz kick good	21	14
2	0:55	3	87	0:45	Utah State	Hunter Sharp 72-yard touchdown reception from Darrell Garretson, Nick Diaz kick good	28	14
3	4:39	6	15	1:39	BYU	41-yard field goal by Trevor Samson	28	17
3	1:49	6	76	2:39	Utah State	Nick Vigil 1-yard touchdown run, Nick Diaz kick good	35	17
4	8:39	8	52	1:33	BYU	34-yard field goal by Trevor Samson	35	20
"TOP" = time of possession. For other American football terms, see Glossary of American football.							35	20

Game Stats:

- Passing: USU, Darrell Garretson 19-25-0-321; BYU, Christian Stewart 10-29-3-172, Taysom Hill 8–11–0–99.
- Rushing: USU, Nick Vigil 16–57–1, Joe Hill 18–54, Rashad Hall 7–10, Kennedy Williams 2–10, LaJuan Hunt 3–8, JoJo Natson 1–6, Garretson 3-(−9); BYU, Jamaal Williams 17–99, Taysom Hill 7–35–1, Christian Stewart 7–11, Paul Lasike 2–6, Algernon Brown 1–3.
- Receiving: USU, Hunter Sharp 5–173–1, Devon Robinson 6–98–2, JoJo Natson 5–34, Joe Hill 2–11, Ronald Butler 1–5; BYU, Mitch Mathews 8–117–1, Jordan Leslie 4–135, Terenn Houk 3–7, Lasike 1–7, Adam Hine 1–4, Williams 1–1.
- Interceptions: USU, Devin Centers 1–34, Frank Sutera 1–21, Torrey Green 1–0.

=== UCF ===
BYU at UCF

Team	1	2	3	4	OT	Total
Cougars	0	3	21	0	0	24
• Knights	10	0	7	7	7	31

- Date: October 9
- Location: Bright House Networks Stadium
  Orlando, FL
- Game start: 7:32 p.m. EST
- Elapsed time: 3:45
- Game attendance: 41,547
- Game weather: 81 °F (27 °C), Partly Cloudy, Winds E 11mph
- Referee: Kevin Mar
- TV announcers (ESPN): Rece Davis, Jesse Palmer, David Pollack, & Samantha Ponder

Uniform combination: white helmet, white jersey, blue pants. Christian Stewart started his first game for BYU at QB hoping to help BYU rebound. The Cougars entered the game with only 2 days of practice to get ready for the Knights and with 5 starters out with injury (Taysom Hill, Brayden Kearsley, Terenn Houk, Alan Fui, and Devin Leavitt). The injuries to Kearsley & Houk allowed UCF's defense to break through the line and pester BYU throughout, sacking Stewart twice forcing one fumble and picking the ball off once. BYU's defense rose to the challenge and was able to stop UCF's offense from scoring on 8 consecutive possessions. The defense picked off two UCF passes and forced two UCF fumbles, allowing BYU to have the short field and take the lead in the third quarter. BYU's defense also forced UCF into two missed field goals in the fourth, forcing the eventual overtime.

Injuries proved once again to be BYU's downfall. Jamaal Williams suffered an ankle injury on the first play of the game, Cornerback Jordan Johnson was carted off the field and taken to a local hospital to have his right arm evaluated, and Craig Bills went out of the game with a concussion. BYU also revealed that receiver Nick Kurtz will seek a redshirt this season and won't play in any of the remaining games.

A conservative rush attack in the fourth quarter forced BYU into 4 consecutive three-and-outs, and UCF won 31–24.

Scoring summary

Quarter	Time	Drive			Team	Scoring information	Score	
Quarter	Time	Plays	Yards	TOP	Team	Scoring information	BYU	UCF
1	8:54	12	79	8:54	UCF	Justin Holman 5-yard touchdown run, Shawn Moffitt kick good	0	7
1	4:37	6	19	3:17	UCF	42-yard field goal by Shawn Moffitt	0	10
2	5:12	10	41	3:23	BYU	32-yard field goal by Trevor Samson	3	10
3	11:56	10	64	3:04	BYU	Colby Pearson 4-yard touchdown reception from Christian Stewart, Trevor Samson kick good	10	10
3	9:30	2	25	0:25	BYU	Devin Mahina 15-yard touchdown reception from Christian Stewart, Trevor Samson kick good	17	10
3	9:05	1	14	0:07	BYU	Devin Mahina 14-yard touchdown reception from Christian Stewart, Trevor Samson kick good	24	10
3	5:37	8	37	3:28	UCF	William Stanback 2-yard touchdown run, Shawn Moffitt kick good	24	17
4	10:17	2	37	0:15	UCF	Josh Reese 37-yard touchdown reception from Justin Holman, Shawn Moffitt kick good	24	24
OT		5	25		UCF	William Stanback 4-yard touchdown reception from Justin Holman, Shawn Moffitt kick good	24	31
"TOP" = time of possession. For other American football terms, see Glossary of American football.							24	31

Game Stats:

- Passing: BYU, Christian Stewart 22-37-1-153; UCF, Justin Holman 30-51-2-326.
- Rushing: BYU, Algernon Brown 16–80, Stewart 13–52, Paul Lasike 12–51, Adam Hine 5–5, Mitch Juergens 1–2, Jamaal Williams 1–1, Team 1-(−2); UCF, William Stanback 22–44–1, Holman 10–26–1, Team 1-(−7).
- Receiving: BYU, Devin Mahina 4–46–2, Mitch Mathews 3–24, Colby Pearson 3–22–1, Jordan Leslie 4–21, Lasike 1–19, Juergens 3–14, Brown 2–6, Keanu Nelson 1–3, Hine 1-(−2); UCF, Josh Reese 5–87–1, Breshad Perriman 6–83, Rannell Hall 8–71, J.J. Worton 3–22, Stanback 2–18–1, Justin Tukes 3–15, Jordan Akins 1–14, Jackie Williams 1–10, Kevin Miller 1–6.
- Interceptions: BYU, Kai Nacua 1–15, Skye Povey 1–15; UCF, Jacoby Glenn 1–0.

=== Nevada ===
Nevada at BYU

Team	1	2	3	4	Total
• Wolf Pack	3	10	7	22	42
Cougars	7	21	0	7	35

- Date: October 18
- Location: LaVell Edwards Stadium
  Provo, UT
- Game start: 8:26 p.m. MST
- Elapsed time: 3:35
- Game attendance: 56,355
- Game weather: 61 °F (16 °C), Partly Cloudy, Winds NW 12mph
- Referee: David Alvarez
- TV announcers (ESPN2/BYUtv): Dave LaMont, Ray Bentley, & Dawn Davenport/Dave McCann, Blaine Fowler, Andy Boyce, & Lauren Francom

Uniform combination: white helmet, blue jersey, white pants. For the second consecutive game Christian Stewart had one quarter where he was on fire, passing for more than 150 yards in the second quarter and throwing for three touchdowns. However Cody Fajardo rebounded from a slow first half to throw for more than 200 of his 285 yards passing in the second half. Nevada was also able to get a running game going in the second half thanks to Don Jackson, who carried 18 times for 62 yards, and the Wolf Pack rallied to hand BYU their third straight loss and second consecutive fourth quarter loss. BYU had the chance with under 2 minutes to tie the game up, but a late fumble at the Nevada 34 yard line, the second fumble within three possessions, sealed the win for the Wolf Pack. It was both fumbles that proved to be the difference in the game. BYU fumbled the ball 3 times, two of which led to Nevada touchdowns. The third allowed Nevada to kneel and run out the clock.

Scoring summary

Quarter	Time	Drive			Team	Scoring information	Score	
Quarter	Time	Plays	Yards	TOP	Team	Scoring information	UNR	BYU
1	11:13	11	49	3:47	UNR	44-yard field goal by Brent Zuzo	3	0
1	4:00	12	97	3:03	BYU	Paul Lasike 1-yard touchdown run, Trevor Samson kick good	3	7
2	14:41	14	72	2:52	BYU	Paul Lasike 20-yard touchdown reception from Christian Stewart, Trevor Samson kick good	3	14
2	13:40	3	75	1:01	UNR	James Butler 9-yard touchdown run, Brent Zuzo kick good	10	14
2	11:48	6	60	1:42	BYU	Mitch Mathews 20-yard touchdown reception from Christian Stewart, Trevor Samson kick good	10	21
2	11:13	14	57	6:24	UNR	26-yard field goal by Brent Zuzo	13	21
2	1:00	16	90	4:11	BYU	Mitch Mathews 11-yard touchdown reception from Christian Stewart, Trevor Samson kick good	13	28
3	4:00	13	74	5:04	UNR	Cody Fajardo 1-yard touchdown run, Brent Zuzo kick good	20	28
4	11:18	11	48	4:50	UNR	Richy Turner 18-yard touchdown reception from Cody Fajardo, 2-point pass good	28	28
4	7:34	5	49	2:14	UNR	Cody Fajardo 25-yard touchdown run, Brent Zuzo kick good	35	28
4	5:54	3	20	1:26	UNR	James Butler 6-yard touchdown run, Brent Zuzo kick good	42	28
4	2:34	15	75	3:20	BYU	Keanu Nelson 8-yard touchdown reception from Christian Stewart, 2-point pass good	42	35
"TOP" = time of possession. For other American football terms, see Glossary of American football.							42	35

Game Stats:

- Passing: UNR, Cody Fajardo 26-40-0-285; BYU, Christian Stewart 39-36-0-408.
- Rushing: UNR, Don Jackson 3–95, Jarred Gipson 4–61, Richy Turner 9–56–1, Hans Henderson 6–47, Kendall Brook 3–21, James Butler 1–5; BYU, Nate Carter 7–87, Christian Stewart 16–47, Paul Lasike 12–46–1, Algernon Brown 1–11, Mitch Juergens 1–5, Jordan Leslie 1–1, Terenn Houk 1-(−4).
- Receiving: UNR, Don Jackson 18–62, Cody Fajardo 8–47–2, James Butler 9–19–2; BYU, Mitch Mathews 16–182–2, Paul Lasike 5–69–1, Jordan Leslie 6–47, Mitch Juergens 4–41, Devin Mahina 2–19, Keanu Nelson 2–13–1, Colby Pearson 1–13, Algernon Brown 1–11, Terenn Houk 1–9, Trey Dye 1–4.

=== Boise State ===
BYU at Boise State

Team	1	2	3	4	Total
Cougars	0	16	7	7	30
• Broncos	10	31	7	7	55

- Date: October 25
- Location: Albertsons Stadium
  Boise, ID
- Game start: 7:01 p.m. MST
- Elapsed time: 3:15
- Game attendance: 36,752
- Game weather: 60 °F (16 °C), Clear, Winds WNW 8mph
- Referee: Reggie Smith
- TV announcers (ESPN): Dave Flemming, David Diaz-Infante, & Allison Williams

After four consecutive games where BYU gave up more than 400 yards Bronco Mendenhall took over the defensive playing calling responsibilities. The change in play calling didn't faze Boise State. BYU gave up 9 plays of 15+ yards passing and another 4 against the rush. Boise State would win the turnover battle 2 to 1, and while the Cougars limited their turnovers Boise State would score touchdowns off of both of BYU's turnovers. Jamaal Williams returned and once again assumed the mantle of top running back, but even his spark and a 19-yard touchdown run couldn't help the Cougar D stop the big plays.

BYU's defense gave their offense many opportunities and scored nine points themselves, but ten times Boise's defense held BYU to four or fewer plays. In the end Boise State controlled the ball 13 more minutes than BYU and drove down the field six times for 60 or more yards to pull away from BYU. The fourth consecutive loss for BYU gave the Cougars their first four-game losing streak since 2010 and gave the Cougars their first winless October since 1993.

Uniform combination: white helmet, white jersey, blue pants.

Scoring summary

Quarter	Time	Drive			Team	Scoring information	Score	
Quarter	Time	Plays	Yards	TOP	Team	Scoring information	BYU	BSU
1	12:21	7	60	2:39	BSU	21-yard field goal by Dan Goodale	0	3
1	5:33	10	76	5:34	BSU	Grant Hedrick 12-yard touchdown run, Dan Goodale kick good	0	10
2	12:21	4	5	1:33	BSU	25-yard field goal by Dan Goodale	0	13
2	13:31	2	94	0:36	BSU	Thomas Sperbeck 78-yard touchdown reception from Grant Hedrick, Dan Goodale kick good	0	20
2	9:12	13	65	4:19	BYU	Jamaal Williams 19-yard touchdown run, Trevor Samson kick good	7	20
2	8:05	2	94	0:36	BSU	Shane Williams-Rhodes 49-yard touchdown reception from Grant Hedrick, Dan Goodale kick good	7	27
2	7:47	1	81	0:18	BYU	Colby Pearson 81-yard touchdown reception from Christian Stewart, Trevor Samson kick good	14	27
2	3:39	9	77	4:08	BSU	Jay Ajayi 3-yard touchdown run, Dan Goodale kick good	14	34
2	1:26				BSU	Jay Ajayi tackled in end zone for a safety by Logan Taele	16	34
2	0:42	2	24	0:12	BSU	Troy Ware 19-yard touchdown reception from Grant Hedrick, Dan Goodale kick good	16	41
3	11:54				BYU	Interception returned 20 yards for touchdown by Fred Warner, Trevor Samson kick good	23	41
3	6:54	4	36	1:31	BSU	Jake Roh 8-yard touchdown reception from Grant Hedrick, Dan Goodale kick good	23	48
4	8:21	10	80	4:21	BSU	Jay Ajayi 2-yard touchdown run, Dan Goodale kick good	23	55
4	5:11	10	77	3:10	BYU	Christian Stewart 2-yard touchdown run, Trevor Samson kick good	30	55
"TOP" = time of possession. For other American football terms, see Glossary of American football.							30	55

Game Stats:

- Passing: BYU, Christian Stewart 22-38-1-259; BSU, Grant Hedrick 24-31-1-410.
- Rushing: BYU, Jamaal Williams 16–70–1, Paul Lasike 3–4, Nate Carter 1–0, Christian Stewart 6-(−11); BSU, Jay Ajayi 26–118–2, Jeremy McNichols 4–32, Devan Demas 6–32, Grant Hedrick 8–29–1, Ryan Finley 1–21, Chaz Anderson 1-(−1), Team 2-(−4).
- Receiving: BYU, Colby Pearson 5–109–1, Jordan Leslie 5–34, Mitch Mathews 4–54, Paul Lasike 3–29, Jamaal Williams 3–1, Mitch Juergens 1–23, Terenn Houk 1–5, Devin Mahina 1–4; BSU, Thomas Sperbeck 6–148–1, Shane Williams-Rhodes 6–89–1, Chaz Anderson 3–78, Jeremy McNichols 2–26, Jay Ajayi 2–26, Jake Roh 2–14–1, Troy Ware 1–19–1, Dallas Burroughs 1–6, Holden Huff 1–4.
- Interceptions: BYU, Fred Warner 1–20–1; BSU, Darian Thompson 1–2.

=== Middle Tennessee ===
BYU at Middle Tennessee

Team	1	2	3	4	Total
• Cougars	7	0	14	6	27
Blue Raiders	0	7	0	0	7

- Date: November 1
- Location: Johnny "Red" Floyd Stadium
  Murfreesboro, TN
- Game start: 2:39 p.m. CST
- Elapsed time: 3:09
- Game attendance: 18,952
- Game weather: 45 °F (7 °C), Chilly & Windy, Winds NNW 14mph
- Referee: Dan Romeo
- TV announcers (CBSSN): Rich Waltz, Jay Feely, & Cassie Gallo

Uniform combination: white helmet, white jersey, blue pants After a four-game losing streak the Cougars headed to Murfreesboro, TN to play their coldest game of the year to date. The wind caused both teams to focus on a run first attack during most of the first half, and the Cougars ended up paying the price when junior running back Jamaal Williams suffered a season ending knee injury. With Williams out the Cougars let Stewart start to pass more frequently. The result was Stewart's third consecutive game with more than 300 yards passing, his first game with no turnovers, and BYU ended the four game losing streak. The win became Stewart's first win as BYU's starting QB.

Scoring summary

Quarter	Time	Drive			Team	Scoring information	Score	
Quarter	Time	Plays	Yards	TOP	Team	Scoring information	BYU	MT
1	12:36	8	69	2:24	BYU	Colby Pearson 37-yard touchdown reception from Christian Stewart, Trevor Samson kick good	7	0
2	4:04	6	60	2:16	MT	Devin Clarke 22-yard touchdown reception from Austin Grammer, Cody Clark kick good	7	7
3	9:24	10	69	3:20	BYU	Jordan Leslie 19-yard touchdown reception from Christian Stewart, Trevor Samson kick good	14	7
3	0:20	9	65	2:27	BYU	Paul Lasike 2-yard touchdown run, Trevor Samson kick good	21	7
4	4:37	7	80	2:50	BYU	Christian Stewart 1-yard touchdown run, Trevor Samson kick no good	27	7
"TOP" = time of possession. For other American football terms, see Glossary of American football.							27	7

Game Stats:

- Passing: BYU, Christian Stewart 28-45-0-316; MT, Austin Grammer 16-32-2-119.
- Rushing: BYU, Jamaal Williams 16–49, Paul Lasike 5–28–1, Nate Carter 5–24, Adam Hine 3–25, Christian Stewart 7–5–1, Mitch Juergens 1–5, Team 2-(−8); MT, Shane Tucker 10–49, Jordan Parker 7–32, Reggie Whatley 6–24, AJ Erdely 2–7, Austin Grammer 12-(−3).
- Receiving: BYU, Mitch Mathews 6–60, Devin Mahina 4–40, Paul Lasike 4–22, Colby Pearson 3–45–1, Jordan Leslie 3–33–1, Terenn Houk 2–28, Jamaal Williams 2–24, Mitch Juergens 2–12, Kurt Henderson 1–33, Keanu Nelson 1–19; MT, Marcus Henry 5–33, Devin Clarke 3–43, Shane Tucker 2–14, Chris Perkins 2–11, D Frazier 2-(−1), Tyler Barron 1–11, Shannon Smith 1–8.
- Interceptions: BYU, Jordan Praetor 1–0, Tomasi Laulile 1–0.

=== UNLV ===
UNLV at BYU

Team	1	2	3	4	Total
Rebels	3	10	10	0	23
• Cougars	7	14	21	0	42

- Date: November 15
- Location: LaVell Edwards Stadium
  Provo, UT
- Game start: 5:02 p.m. MST
- Elapsed time: 3:42
- Game attendance: 53,622
- Game weather: 30 °F (−1 °C), Cloudy w/ Snow possible, Winds NE 8mph
- Referee: Rick Louimet
- TV announcers (ESPNU/BYUtv): Anish Shroff & Kelly Stouffer/Dave McCann, Blaine Fowler, Andy Boyce, & Lauren Francom

Uniform combination: black helmet with royal blue decals and black facemasks, black jersey, black pants The Rebels surprised BYU by shutting down their running game in the first half. Accompanied by two first half turnovers, the Rebels were able to keep the game close. However BYU let Stewart fly free in the third quarter. Stewart did his best Taysom Hill impression to avoid being sacked multiple times. For the second consecutive game he threw no interceptions and for the fourth straight game he threw over 300 yards. The result was BYU pulling away for the win. After the game BYU officially accepted a bowl invitation to the Miami Beach Bowl. The key difference in the game was red/blue zone efficiency. BYU went 4/4 with four touchdowns. UNLV went 2/2, but both times they were forced to field goals. Had they capitalized these chances into touchdowns, the first half would have been a very different story.

Scoring summary

Quarter	Time	Drive			Team	Scoring information	Score	
Quarter	Time	Plays	Yards	TOP	Team	Scoring information	UNLV	BYU
1	9:13	6	16	2:45	UNLV	46-yard field goal by Jonathan Leiva	3	0
1	7:25	6	84	1:43	BYU	Jordan Leslie 30-yard touchdown run, Trevor Samson kick good	3	7
2	6:18	4	65	1:05	BYU	Paul Lasike 8-yard touchdown run, Trevor Samson kick good	3	14
2	5:32	2	75	0:50	UNLV	Shaquille Murray-Lawrence 68-yard touchdown run, Jonathan Levia kick good	10	14
2	3:00	7	34	2:28	UNLV	21-yard field goal by Jonathan Leiva	13	14
2	1:23	5	65	1:29	BYU	Paul Lasike 4-yard touchdown run, Trevor Samson kick good	13	21
3	13:25	6	88	1:27	BYU	Devin Mahina 15-yard touchdown reception from Christian Stewart, Trevor Samson kick good	13	28
3	11:11	4	3	0:56	UNLV	33-yard field goal by Jonathan Leiva	16	28
3	5:42	7	67	1:36	BYU	Paul Lasike 26-yard touchdown reception from Christian Stewart, Trevor Samson kick good	16	35
3	1:57	11	65	3:45	UNLV	Devonte Boyd 40-yard touchdown reception from Jared Lebowitz, Jonathan Leiva kick good	23	35
3	1:31	2	51	0:19	BYU	Mitch Mathews 8-yard touchdown reception from Christian Stewart, Trevor Samson kick good	23	42
"TOP" = time of possession. For other American football terms, see Glossary of American football.							23	42

Game Stats:

- Passing: UNLV, Blake Decker 10–25–1–90, Jared Lebowitz 10-20-0-114; BYU, Christian Stewart 18-32-0-325.
- Rushing: UNLV, Shaquielle Murray-Lawrence 20–143–1, Keith Whitely 13–51, Blake Decker 7–8, Marcus Sullivan 2–1, Jared Lebowitz 3-(−4); BYU, Paul Lasike 8–70–2, Nate Carter 7–55, Adam Hine 8–45, Christian Stewart 6–38, Jordan Leslie 2–33–1, Algernon Brown 6–32, Trey Dye 1-(−2).
- Receiving: UNLV, Devonte Boyd 5–70–1, Devante Davis 5–51, Keith Whitely 4–48, Maika Mataele 2–10, Shaquielle Murray Lawrence 2–8, Kendal Keys 1–11, Marcus Sullivan 1–6; BYU, Mitch Mathews 6–120–1, Jordan Leslie 5–68, Terenn Houk 2–38, Colby Pearson 1–34, Paul Lasike 1–26–1, Devin Mahina 1–15–1, Ross Apo 1–13, Mitch Juergens 1–11.
- Interceptions: BYU, Kai Nacua 1–32.

=== Savannah State ===
Savannah State at BYU

Team	1	2	3	4	Total
Tigers	0	0	0	0	0
• Cougars	21	30	0	13	64

- Date: November 22
- Location: LaVell Edwards Stadium
  Provo, UT
- Game start: 1:05 p.m. MST
- Elapsed time: 2:58
- Game attendance: 52,123
- Game weather: 41 °F (5 °C), Cloudy w/ rain, Winds S 5mph
- Referee: Cooper Castleberry
- TV announcers (BYUtv): Dave McCann, Blaine Fowler, Andy Boyce, & Lauren Francom

Uniform combination: white helmet, blue jersey, white pants

Scoring summary

Quarter	Time	Drive			Team	Scoring information	Score	
Quarter	Time	Plays	Yards	TOP	Team	Scoring information	SSU	BYU
1	13:40	4	85	1:20	BYU	Mitch Mathews 71-yard touchdown reception from Christian Stewart, Trevor Samson kick good	0	7
1	7:24	8	80	3:07	BYU	Christian Stewart 16-yard touchdown run, Trevor Samson kick good	0	14
1	3:32	7	61	2:02	BYU	Mitch Mathews 15-yard touchdown reception from Christian Stewart, Trevor Samson kick good	0	21
2	12:31	7	28	1:45	BYU	Terenn Houk 9-yard touchdown reception from Christian Stewart, Trevor Samson kick good	0	28
2	12:05	1	6	0:07	BYU	Christian Stewart 6-yard touchdown run, Trevor Samson kick good	0	35
2	10:03	1	1	0:05	BYU	Jordan Leslie 1-yard touchdown reception from Christian Stewart, Trevor Samson kick good	0	42
2	4:12	10	59	4:00	BYU	Nate Carter 2-yard touchdown run, Trevor Samson kick good	0	49
2	2:19				BYU	David Kessler punt blocked then kicks it out of the end zone.	0	51
4	9:13	12	72	5:15	BYU	31-yard field goal by Trevor Samson	0	54
4	12:47	4	9	2:04	BYU	32-yard field goal by Trevor Samson	0	57
4	2:08	12	76	7:52	BYU	AJ Moore 6-yard touchdown run, Trevor Samson kick good	0	64
"TOP" = time of possession. For other American football terms, see Glossary of American football.							0	64

Game Stats:

- Passing: SSU, Leon Prunty 10–25–1–40, Michael Knox 0–3–0–0; BYU, Christian Stewart 12-17-0-196, McCoy Hill 2–2–0–27.
- Rushing: SSU, Michael Knox 3–14, Richard Williams II 6–12, Nicholas Bentley 3–7, Anthony Criswell 3–5, Alex Simmons 2–31, Stephen Reynolds 1–0, Leon Prunty 4-(−5); BYU, Nate Carter 20–116–1, AJ Moore 10–62–1, Christian Stewart 5–44–2, Hunter Moore 7–30, McCoy Hill 5–27, Algernon Brown 2–17, Adam Hine 4–9, Paul Lasike 3–8, Toloa Ho Ching 1–0.
- Receiving: SSU, Jeremiah Harris 4–17, Kris Drummond 2–6, Dereon London 1–11, Keynnard Campbell 1–5, Jaylen McGriff 1–2, Steven Hagan 1-(−1); BYU, Mitch Mathews 4–110–2, Jordan Leslie 3–36–1, Devin Mahina 2–32, Terenn Houk 2–12–1, Mitch Juergens 1–19, Nate Carter 1–8, Paul Lasike 1–6.
- Interceptions: BYU, Alani Fua 1–20.

=== Cal ===
BYU at Cal

Team	1	2	3	4	Total
• Cougars	14	0	14	14	42
Golden Bears	7	14	7	7	35

- Date: November 29
- Location: California Memorial Stadium
  Berkeley, CA
- Game start: 1:38 p.m. PST
- Elapsed time: 3:29
- Game attendance: 47,856
- Game weather: 63 °F (17 °C), Cloudy w/ chance of rain, Winds NW 3mph
- Referee: Terry Leyden
- TV announcers (P12): Ted Robinson, Glenn Parker, & Jill Savage

Uniform combination: white helmet, white jersey, blue pants

Scoring summary

Quarter	Time	Drive			Team	Scoring information	Score	
Quarter	Time	Plays	Yards	TOP	Team	Scoring information	BYU	Cal
1	12:18	10	73	2:42	BYU	Paul Lasike 1-yard touchdown run, Trevor Samson kick good	7	0
1	7:37	13	84	4:39	Cal	Kenny Lawler 9-yard touchdown reception from Jared Goff, James Langford kick good	7	7
1	1:04	7	74	1:48	BYU	Mitch Juergens 47-yard touchdown reception from Christian Stewart, Trevor Samson kick good	14	7
2	13:44	7	67	2:14	Cal	Kenny Lawler 16-yard touchdown reception from Jared Goff, James Langford kick good	14	14
2	7:29	9	68	3:27	Cal	Kenny Lawler 1-yard touchdown reception from Jared Goff, James Langford kick good	14	21
3	9:12	8	85	2:28	BYU	Algernon Brown 22-yard touchdown reception from Christian Stewart, Trevor Samson kick good	21	21
3	4:12	8	67	3:07	Cal	Tre Watson 9-yard touchdown run, James Langford kick good	21	28
3	1:08	10	81	2:56	BYU	Mitch Juergens 9-yard touchdown reception from Christian Stewart, Trevor Samson kick good	28	28
4	11:49	5	99	1:44	BYU	Jordan Leslie 83-yard touchdown reception from Christian Stewart, Trevor Samson kick good	35	28
4	9:17	7	80	2:31	Cal	Trevor Davis 23-yard touchdown reception from Jared Goff, James Langford kick good	35	35
4	2:39	5	66	2:28	BYU	Jordan Leslie 38-yard touchdown reception from Christian Stewart, Trevor Samson kick good	42	35
"TOP" = time of possession. For other American football terms, see Glossary of American football.							42	35

Game Stats:

- Passing: BYU, Christian Stewart 23-38-1-433; CAL, Jared Goff 38-60-1-393.
- Rushing: BYU, Paul Lasike 12–63–1, Algernon Brown 11–38, Adam Hine 3–20, Team 2-(−2), Christian Stewart 11-(−12); CAL, Daniel Lasco 26–130, Jared Goff 7–23, Tre Watson 5–18–1, Vic Enwere 2–3, Luke Rubenzer 1(−1).
- Receiving: BYU, Mitch Juergens 7–107–2, Devon Blackmon 6–60, Jordan Leslie 5–155–2, Algernon Brown 2–31–1, Mitch Mathews 1–39, Paul Lasike 1–28, Terenn Houk 1–13; CAL, Kenny Lawler 12–138–3, Chris Harper 8–98, Bryce Treggs 6–51, Maurice Harris 3–28, Daniel Lasco 3–13, Stephen Anderson 2–30, Trevor Davis 2–22–1, Matt Rockett 2–13.
- Interceptions: BYU, Skye Povey 1–27; CAL, Caleb Coleman 1–4.

=== Miami Beach Bowl ===
BYU vs. Memphis

Team	1	2	3	4	OT	Total
Cougars	14	14	0	17	3	48
• Tigers	17	7	14	7	10	55

- Date: December 22
- Location: Marlins Park
  Miami, FL
- Game start: 2:05 p.m. EST
- Elapsed time: 3:58
- Game attendance: 20,761
- Game weather: 78 °F (26 °C), Partly cloudy, Winds SSE 12mph
- Referee: Wayne Winkler
- TV announcers (ESPN/BYU Radio Network): Dave Flemming, Danny Kanell, & Allison Williams/Greg Wrubell, Marc Lyons, & Nathan Meikle

Uniform combination: white helmet, white jersey, white pants

Scoring summary

Quarter	Time	Drive			Team	Scoring information	Score	
Quarter	Time	Plays	Yards	TOP	Team	Scoring information	BYU	MEM
1	13:54	3	35	0:23	MEM	Keiwone Malone 33-yard touchdown reception from Paxton Lynch, Jake Elliott kick good	0	7
1	12:17	5	82	1:37	BYU	Mitchell Juergens 47-yard touchdown reception from Christian Stewart, Trevor Samson kick good	7	7
1	9:49	8	58	2:28	MEM	Paxton Lynch 1-yard touchdown run, Jake Elliott kick good	7	14
1	7:16	7	81	2:33	BYU	Mitch Mathews 25-yard touchdown reception from Christian Stewart, Trevor Samson kick good	14	14
1	2:22	5	44	1:19	MEM	39-yard field goal by Jake Elliott	14	17
2	12:44	7	31	2:16	MEM	Paxton Lynch 3-yard touchdown run, Jake Elliott kick good	14	24
2	4:55	14	62	4:49	BYU	Jordan Leslie 23-yard touchdown reception from Christian Stewart, Trevor Samson kick good	21	24
2	3:11	4	15	1:19	BYU	Paul Lasike 3-yard touchdown run, Trevor Samson kick good	28	24
3	9:50	13	71	5:10	MEM	Paxton Lynch 1-yard touchdown run, Jake Elliott kick good	28	31
3	3:45	6	73	2:16	MEM	Alan Cross 17-yard touchdown reception from Paxton Lynch, Jake Elliott kick good	28	38
4	11:35	5	42	1:08	BYU	23-yard field goal by Trevor Samson	31	38
4	10:52	2	26	0:43	BYU	Paul Lasike 7-yard touchdown run, Trevor Samson kick good	38	38
4	7:48				BYU	Interception returned 18 yards for touchdown by Zac Stout, Trevor Samson kick good	45	38
4	0:45	8	33	1:49	MEM	Keiwone Malone 5-yard touchdown reception from Paxton Lynch, Jake Elliott kick good	45	45
OT		4	−3		BYU	45-yard field goal by Trevor Samson	48	45
OT		4	−12		MEM	55-yard field goal by Jake Elliott	48	48
2OT		4	25		MEM	Roderick Proctor 11-yard touchdown reception from Paxton Lynch, Jake Elliott kick good	48	55
"TOP" = time of possession. For other American football terms, see Glossary of American football.							48	55

Game Stats:

- Passing: BYU, Christian Stewart 23-48-3-348; MEM, Paxton Lynch 24-46-3-306.
- Rushing: BYU, Algernon Brown 19–79, Paul Lasike 7–11–2, Mitch Juergens 1–3, Adam Hine 3–0, Team 1-(−5), Christian Stewart 11-(−11); MEM, Brandon Haynes 22–49, Keiwone Malone 2–41, Paxton Lynch 13–38–3, Sam Craft 7–28, Jarvis Cooper 5–18, Mose Frazier 1–1, Team 1-(−1).
- Receiving: BYU, Mitch Mathews 9–82–1, Mitch Juergens 4–87–1, Devin Mahina 2–54, Terenn Houk 2–42, Jordan Leslie 1–23–1, Paul Lasike 1–19, Devon Blackmon 1–14, Adam Hine 1–11, Keanu Nelson 1–9, Algernon Brown 1–7; MEM, Keiwone Malone 6–75–2, Brandon Hayes 4–35, Mose Frazier 4–31, Alan Cross 3–69–1, Phil Mayhue 2–23, Daniel Montiel 2–17, Rod Proctor 2–14–1, Joe Craig 1–42.
- Interceptions: BYU, Alani Fua 1–37, Zac Stout 1–19–1, Manoa Pikula 1–2; MEM, Derek Howard 1–2, DeShaughn Terry 1–0, Bobby McCain 1-(−2).

== Rankings ==
Ranking movements Legend: ██ Increase in ranking ██ Decrease in ranking — = Not ranked RV = Received votes
	Week																
Poll	Pre	1	2	3	4	5	6	7	8	9	10	11	12	13	14	15	Final
AP	RV	RV	25	21	20	18	RV	—	—	—	—	—	—	—	—	—	
Coaches	RV	RV	RV	23	21	19	RV	RV	—	—	—	—	—	—	—	—	
CFP	Not released									—	—	—	—	—	—	—	Not released
