= Derek West =

Derek West may refer to:

- Derek West (American football) (born 1972), American football tackle
- Derek West (baseball) (born 1996), American baseball player
- G. Derek West (1922–2002), British academic
- Tony West (attorney) (Derek Anthony West, born 1965), American lawyer
