= Paxton Lynch =

American football player (born 1994)

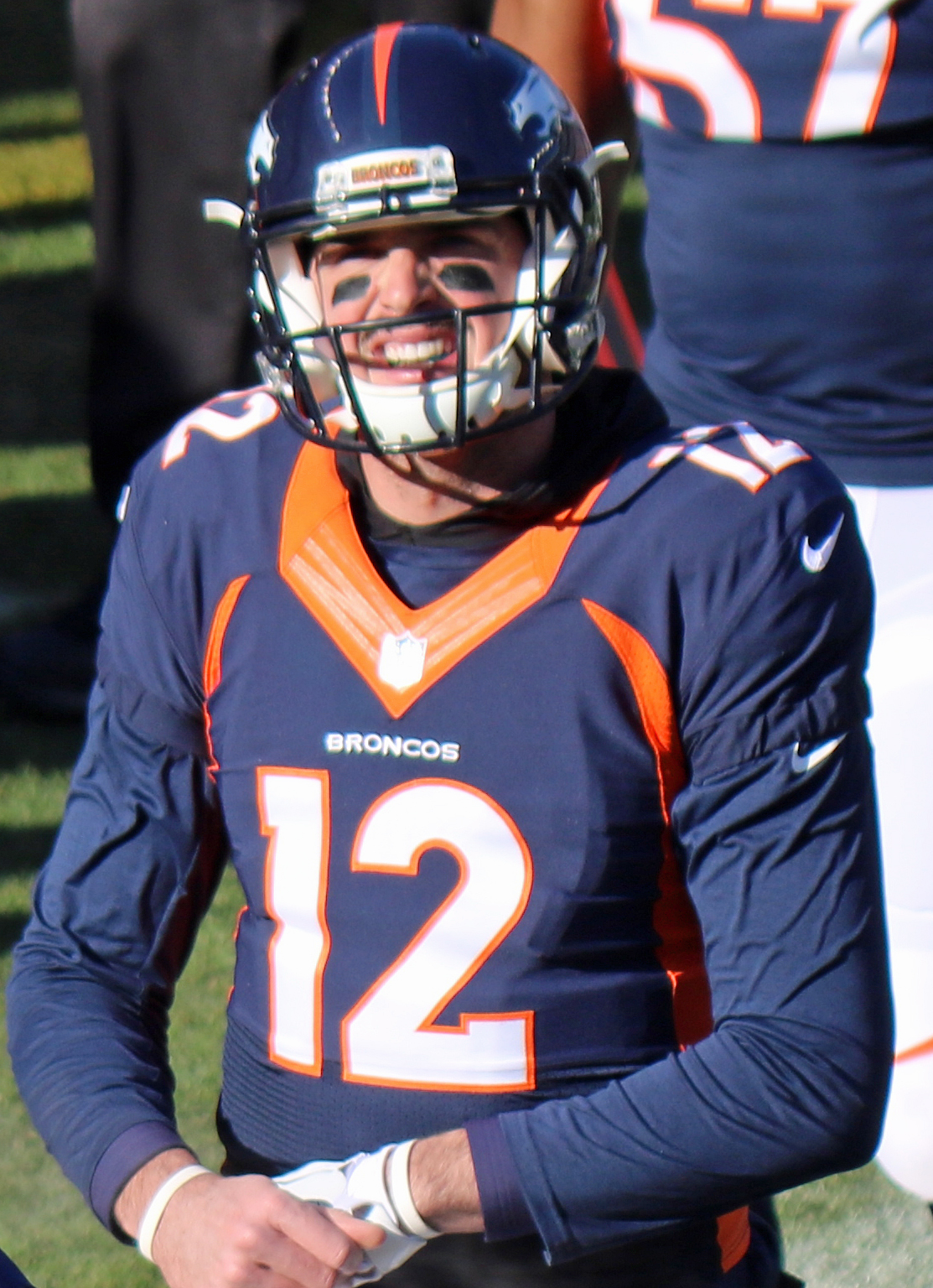
- Lynch with the Denver Broncos in 2016

Colorado Spartans
- Position: Quarterback

Personal information
- Born: February 12, 1994 (age 32); San Antonio, Texas, U.S.
- Listed height: 6 ft 7 in (2.01 m)
- Listed weight: 245 lb (111 kg)

Career information
- High school: Trinity Christian Academy (Deltona, Florida)
- College: Memphis (2012–2015)
- NFL draft: 2016: 1st round, 26th overall pick

Career history
- Denver Broncos (2016–2017); Seattle Seahawks (2019)*; Pittsburgh Steelers (2019); Saskatchewan Roughriders (2021); Michigan Panthers (2022); Orlando Guardians (2023); San Antonio Brahmas (2023); Colorado Spartans (2026–present)
- * Offseason or practice squad member only

Career NFL statistics
- Passing attempts: 128
- Passing completions: 79
- Completion percentage: 61.7%
- Passing yards: 792
- TD–INT: 4–4
- Passer rating: 76.7
- Stats at Pro Football Reference
- Stats at CFL.ca

Paxton James Lynch (born February 12, 1994) is an American professional football quarterback for the Colorado Spartans of the National Arena League (NAL). He played college football for the Memphis Tigers, and was selected in the first round of the 2016 NFL draft by the Denver Broncos. Lynch played just two seasons in Denver and made four starts before being released prior to the 2018 season. Lynch was also a member of the Seattle Seahawks and Pittsburgh Steelers of the NFL, the Saskatchewan Roughriders of the Canadian Football League (CFL), the Michigan Panthers of the United States Football League (USFL), and the Orlando Guardians and San Antonio Brahmas of the XFL.

== Early life ==
Lynch attended Trinity Christian Academy in Deltona, Florida, where he played football and basketball. During his high school career, he passed for 2,099 yards. Lynch was rated by Rivals.com as a three-star recruit. He committed to the University of Memphis to play college football.

== College career ==
After redshirting for his freshman year at Memphis in 2012, Lynch was named the Tigers' starting quarterback prior to the 2013 season. He started all 12 games, completing 203 of 349 passes for 2,056 yards, nine touchdowns and 10 interceptions. As a sophomore in 2014, Lynch started all 13 games. He completed 259 of 413 attempts for 3,031 yards, 22 touchdowns, and nine interceptions. He also rushed for 321 yards and 13 touchdowns. Lynch was named the MVP of the 2014 Miami Beach Bowl after passing for 306 yards with four passing touchdowns and three rushing touchdowns against BYU. As a junior in 2015, Lynch again started all 13 games. He completed 296 of 443 passes (66.8%) for 3,778 yards, 28 touchdowns (all five school records) and four interceptions. In Memphis' 63–0 victory over SMU, Lynch tied a Football Bowl Subdivision record with seven passing touchdowns in a half. He finished 9 of 14 for 222 yards, and completed his touchdown throws to seven different receivers. After the season, he decided to forgo his senior year and enter the 2016 NFL draft. Lynch graduated from Memphis in May 2016 with a B.S.E. in sport and leisure management.

Lynch's 35 touchdowns in 2014 and 30 in 2015 are first and second in Memphis history, and his 76 for his career is second all-time. He also ranks first and second for most total offense in a season (4,015 yards in 2015; 3,352 in 2014). He has four of the seven most passing yards in a game, including the school record 447 on October 23, 2015, at Tulsa. He ranks second all-time in career attempts, completions, completion percentage, passing yards, and passing touchdowns.

== Professional career ==
=== Pre-draft ===
Lynch was predicted to be selected in the first round of the 2016 NFL draft by draft analysts and in mock drafts prior to the draft. He was rated the third best quarterback in the 2016 draft by NFLDraftScout.com.

Pre-draft measurables
Height	Weight	Arm length	Hand span	Wingspan	40-yard dash	10-yard split	20-yard split	20-yard shuttle	Three-cone drill	Vertical jump	Broad jump	Wonderlic
6 ft 6 5/8 in (2.00 m)	244 lb (111 kg)	34 1/4 in (0.87 m)	10 1/4 in (0.26 m)	6 ft 9 3/4 in (2.08 m)	4.86 s	1.66 s	2.81 s	4.26 s	7.14 s	36 in (0.91 m)	9 ft 10 in (3.00 m)	18
All values from NFL Combine

=== Denver Broncos ===
==== 2016 ====
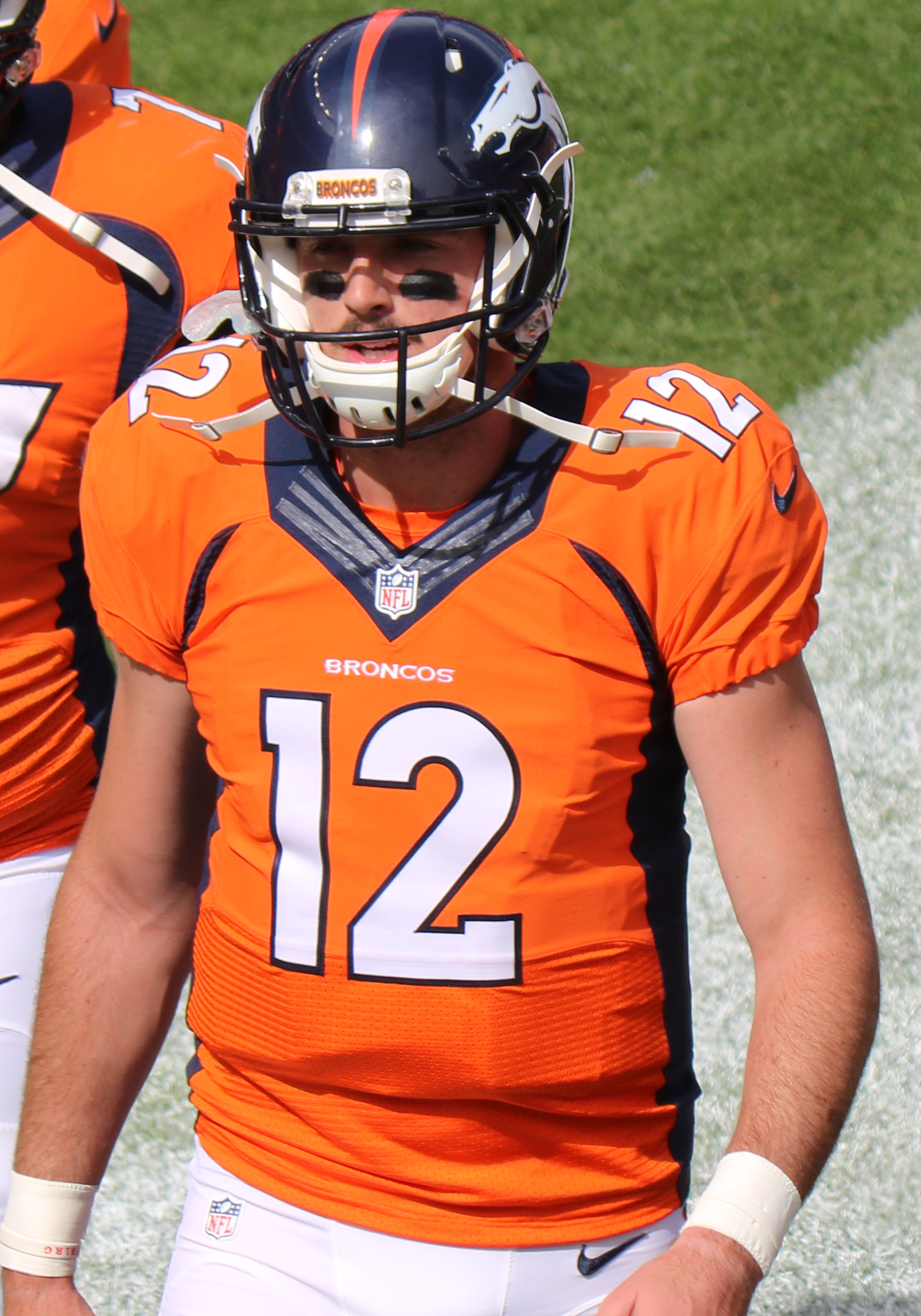
Lynch with the Broncos in 2016

The Denver Broncos selected Lynch in the first round (26th overall) of the 2016 NFL Draft in a pick acquired from the Seattle Seahawks for their first and third round pick. He was the third of 15 quarterbacks taken, behind Jared Goff and Carson Wentz, the #1 and #2 overall picks. On June 9, 2016, the Broncos signed Lynch to a four-year, $9,476,296 contract with a $5,091,852 signing bonus.

On October 2, 2016, Lynch played in his first NFL regular-season game against the Tampa Bay Buccaneers, replacing the injured Trevor Siemian. He finished with 170 passing yards on 14 of 24 attempts and threw his first career touchdown pass to wide receiver Emmanuel Sanders in a 27–7 road win at Raymond James Stadium. In Week 5, Lynch started his first NFL game, completing 23 of 35 passes for 223 yards, one touchdown, and one interception in the 23–16 loss to the Atlanta Falcons. He was sacked six times, a record for a Broncos rookie. In Week 13, Lynch again replaced the injured Siemian against the Jacksonville Jaguars, posting 12 completions on 24 passing attempts for 104 yards in a 20–10 win. Overall, he finished his rookie season with 497 passing yards, two passing touchdowns, and one interception.

==== 2017 ====
Lynch suffered a shoulder injury against the Green Bay Packers in the team's third preseason game of the 2017 season. In Week 11 against the Cincinnati Bengals, Lynch was active for the first time that season and was the backup to Brock Osweiler. On November 21, Lynch was named the team's starter for the Week 12 game against the Oakland Raiders. Lynch completed 9 of 14 passes for 41 yards and an interception that occurred in the endzone, the Raiders' first interception of the season. Lynch left the game with an ankle injury in the third quarter and was relieved by Siemian for the remainder of the game as the Broncos lost 21–14. A day after the game, it was announced that Lynch would miss two to four weeks due to his injury. On December 31, Lynch started the regular season finale against the Kansas City Chiefs, in a game that marked Patrick Mahomes’ first career start. In the 27–24 loss, he finished 21 of 31 for 254 passing yards, two touchdowns, and two interceptions.

==== 2018 ====
Going into mini-camps for the 2018 season, it was announced that Lynch would serve as backup quarterback, behind the newly acquired Case Keenum. Two days after the Broncos preseason opener against the Minnesota Vikings, the team announced that Lynch had been demoted to third-string quarterback as Chad Kelly was promoted to backup. He was released by the Broncos on September 2, 2018, after the team acquired Kevin Hogan. In two seasons with the team, Lynch made just four starts and threw four touchdowns and four interceptions.

=== Seattle Seahawks ===
On January 17, 2019, Lynch signed with the Seattle Seahawks after spending the 2018 season as a free agent. He was waived on August 30, 2019, during final roster cuts.

=== Pittsburgh Steelers ===
On September 17, 2019, Lynch was signed to the practice squad of the Pittsburgh Steelers. He was promoted to the active roster on October 11, 2019, following an injury to Mason Rudolph.

On September 5, 2020, Lynch was waived by the Steelers during final roster cuts.

=== Saskatchewan Roughriders ===
On June 28, 2021, it was announced that Lynch had signed with the Saskatchewan Roughriders of the Canadian Football League (CFL). He was placed on the injured list on August 5, before the start of the 2021 CFL season. He was activated on August 13, placed on the injured list again on September 4, activated again on September 23, and placed on the injured list for the third time on November 12. Overall, he was the third-string quarterback (behind Cody Fajardo and Isaac Harker) through the first 13 games of the regular season but did not dress for any games. Beginning on November 30, a federal mandate in Canada was put into place prohibiting people who have not been vaccinated against COVID-19 from flying. Lynch was the Roughriders' only unvaccinated player. As he could no longer travel with the team, Lynch was demoted to the practice roster on November 19, being replaced on the active roster by former practice roster quarterback Mason Fine. Lynch was placed on the injured list for the fourth time on November 27. He was placed on the team's reserve/suspended list on December 4, prior to the West Final playoff game against the Winnipeg Blue Bombers. Lynch was released by Saskatchewan on February 22, 2022.

=== Michigan Panthers ===
On February 22, 2022, Lynch signed with the United States Football League (USFL) and was selected with the eighth pick of the 12th round of the 2022 USFL draft by the Michigan Panthers. Lynch was the last of 16 quarterbacks taken in the draft and the only one to have started an NFL regular season game before being drafted. On May 5, after the third game of the season, he was transferred to the inactive roster with a leg injury. Lynch was named the USFL Offensive Player of the Week for the final week of the regular season after completing 22 of 30 passes (73.3%) for 275 yards, three touchdowns, and one interception in a 33–21 win over the Pittsburgh Maulers. He played in six games, starting three, overall for the Panthers in 2022, completing 54 of 83 passes (65.1%) for 550 yards, five touchdowns, and four interceptions while also rushing 21 times for 74 yards and two touchdowns.

=== Orlando Guardians ===
Lynch signed with the Orlando Guardians of the XFL on January 30, 2023. In his Week 1 start against the Houston Roughnecks, Lynch completed 14 of 20 passes for 125 yards with one passing touchdown, as well as one interception before being benched for backup quarterback Quinten Dormady in the 33–12 loss. Lynch was waived on April 5, 2023, finishing the year with totals of five games played (all starts), 65 completions on 109 passing attempts (59.6%) for 737 yards, four touchdowns and one interception, and 18 rushing attempts for 68 yards and one touchdown.

=== San Antonio Brahmas ===
On April 5, 2023, the San Antonio Brahmas claimed Lynch off waivers from the Orlando Guardians. He played in two games for the Brahmas but did not record any statistics. He was not part of the roster after the 2024 UFL dispersal draft on January 15, 2024.

=== Colorado Spartans ===
On November 1, 2025, Lynch signed with the Colorado Spartans of the National Arena League. Lynch met Spartans owner Tony Thompson at Lynch’s son’s youth football practice. Thompson convinced him to join the Spartans for a contract reportedly worth a maximum of $600 per game. In his third game for the Spartans, Lynch suffered a season-ending injury, tearing the LCL in his right knee.

== Career statistics ==
=== NFL ===
Year	Team	Games			Passing								Rushing			
Year	Team	GP	GS	Record	Cmp	Att	Pct	Yds	Avg	TD	Int	Rtg	Att	Yds	Avg	TD
2016	DEN	3	2	1–1	49	83	59.0	497	6.0	2	1	79.2	11	25	2.3	0
2017	DEN	2	2	0–2	30	45	66.7	295	6.6	2	3	72.0	5	30	6.0	0
2019	PIT	0	0	0–0	DNP											
Career		5	4	1–3	79	128	61.7	792	6.2	4	4	76.7	16	55	3.4	0

=== USFL ===
Year	Team	Games			Passing								Rushing			
Year	Team	GP	GS	Record	Cmp	Att	Pct	Yds	Avg	TD	Int	Rtg	Att	Yds	Avg	TD
2022	MICH	6	3	2–1	54	83	65.1	550	6.6	5	4	83.9	20	74	3.7	2

=== XFL ===
Year	Team	Games			Passing								Rushing			
Year	Team	GP	GS	Record	Cmp	Att	Pct	Yds	Avg	TD	Int	Rtg	Att	Yds	Avg	TD
2023	ORL	5	5	0–5	65	109	59.6	737	6.8	4	1	88.4	18	68	3.8	1
2023	SA	0	0	0–0	DNP											

=== College ===
Season	Team	Games			Passing								Rushing			
Season	Team	GP	GS	Record	Cmp	Att	Pct	Yds	Y/A	TD	Int	Rtg	Att	Yds	Avg	TD
2012	Memphis	0	0	—	Redshirted (redshirt)											
2013	Memphis	12	12	3–9	203	349	58.2	2,056	5.9	9	10	110.4	88	127	1.4	2
2014	Memphis	13	13	10–3	259	413	62.7	3,031	7.3	22	9	137.6	113	321	2.8	13
2015	Memphis	13	13	9–4	296	443	66.8	3,776	8.5	28	4	157.5	87	239	2.7	2
Career		38	38	22–16	758	1,205	62.9	8,863	7.4	59	23	137.0	288	687	2.4	17
