= 2014 Miami Beach Bowl =

- 1st Miami Beach Bowl
BYU Cougars	Memphis Tigers
(8–4)	(9–3)
Independent	The American
48	55
Head coach: Bronco Mendenhall	Head coach: Justin Fuente
	1	2	3	4	OT	2OT	Total
BYU	14	14	0	17	3	0	48
Memphis	17	7	14	7	3	7	55
- Date: December 22, 2014
- Season: 2014
- Stadium: Marlins Park
- Location: Miami, Florida
- MVP: Memphis QB Paxton Lynch
- Favorite: Memphis by 1.5
- Referee: Wayne Winkler (C-USA)
- Attendance: 20,761
- Payout: US$650,000 per team

United States TV coverage
- Network: ESPN
- Announcers: Dave Flemming, Danny Kanell, & Allison Williams (ESPN)/Greg Wrubell, Marc Lyons, & Nathan Meikle (BYU Radio Network)

The 2014 Miami Beach Bowl was a post-season American college football bowl game played on December 22, 2014, at Marlins Park in Miami, Florida. The first edition of the Miami Beach Bowl, it featured the American Athletic Conference co-champion Memphis Tigers against the BYU Cougars. It began at 2:00 p.m. EST and aired on ESPN. It was one of the 2014–15 bowl games that comprised the conclusion of the 2014 FBS football season.

Memphis defeated BYU in double overtime by the score of 55–48. Afterwards, the two teams engaged in a bench-clearing brawl.

== Team selection ==
The game featured the American Athletic Conference co-champion Memphis Tigers against the BYU Cougars.

This was the first meeting between these two teams.

=== BYU Cougars ===
In April 2014, organizers announced that they had reached a deal with BYU to play in the inaugural Miami Beach Bowl in 2014. After defeating the UNLV Rebels for their sixth win of the season on November 15, bowl director Carlos Padilla II extended an invitation to play in the game.

This was BYU's third Florida bowl game, following the 1976 Tangerine Bowl where they lost to Oklahoma State 21–49, and the 1985 Citrus Bowl where they lost to Ohio State 7–10.

=== Memphis Tigers ===
After finishing the regular season with a 9–3 record and a share of the American Athletic Conference championship, the Tigers accepted their bid to the Miami Beach Bowl.

This was Memphis' second Florida bowl game, following the 2008 St. Petersburg Bowl (the inaugural contest for that bowl game) where they lost to the South Florida Bulls by a score of 14–41. This was the Tigers' first bowl appearance since that game.

== Game summary ==
Scoring summary

Quarter	Time	Drive			Team	Scoring information	Score	
Quarter	Time	Plays	Yards	TOP	Team	Scoring information	BYU	MEM
1	13:54	3	35	0:23	MEM	Keiwone Malone 33-yard touchdown reception from Paxton Lynch, Jake Elliott kick good	0	7
1	12:17	5	82	1:37	BYU	Mitchell Juergens 47-yard touchdown reception from Christian Stewart, Trevor Samson kick good	7	7
1	9:49	8	58	2:28	MEM	Paxton Lynch 1-yard touchdown run, Jake Elliott kick good	7	14
1	7:16	7	81	2:33	BYU	Mitch Mathews 25-yard touchdown reception from Christian Stewart, Trevor Samson kick good	14	14
1	2:22	5	44	1:19	MEM	39-yard field goal by Jake Elliott	14	17
2	12:44	7	31	2:16	MEM	Paxton Lynch 3-yard touchdown run, Jake Elliott kick good	14	24
2	4:55	14	62	4:49	BYU	Jordan Leslie 23-yard touchdown reception from Christian Stewart, Trevor Samson kick good	21	24
2	3:11	4	15	1:19	BYU	Paul Lasike 3-yard touchdown run, Trevor Samson kick good	28	24
3	9:50	13	71	5:10	MEM	Paxton Lynch 1-yard touchdown run, Jake Elliott kick good	28	31
3	3:45	6	73	2:16	MEM	Alan Cross 17-yard touchdown reception from Paxton Lynch, Jake Elliott kick good	28	38
4	11:35	5	42	1:08	BYU	23-yard field goal by Trevor Samson	31	38
4	10:52	2	26	0:43	BYU	Paul Lasike 7-yard touchdown run, Trevor Samson kick good	38	38
4	7:48	–	–	–	BYU	Interception returned 18 yards for touchdown by Zac Stout, Trevor Samson kick good	45	38
4	0:45	8	33	1:49	MEM	Keiwone Malone 5-yard touchdown reception from Paxton Lynch, Jake Elliott kick good	45	45
OT		4	−3	–	BYU	45-yard field goal by Trevor Samson	48	45
OT		4	−12	–	MEM	55-yard field goal by Jake Elliott	48	48
2OT		4	25	–	MEM	Roderick Proctor 11-yard touchdown reception from Paxton Lynch, Jake Elliott kick good	48	55
"TOP" = time of possession. For other American football terms, see Glossary of American football.							48	55

=== Statistics ===
Statistics	BYU	MEM
First downs	22	24
Plays–yards	91–425	97–480
Rushes–yards	42–77	51–174
Passing yards	348	306
Passing: Comp–Att–Int	23–49–3	24–46–3
Time of possession	29:13	30:56

== Post-game ==
=== Brawl ===
During the post game celebration Memphis players ran towards the BYU sideline to celebrate with their fans sitting behind the BYU bench (due to the bizarre baseball stadium field layout, most of the people in attendance could only sit on the BYU side of the field). Some bumping and shoving occurred and one Memphis player was pushed in the back by a BYU player that was allegedly also being pushed from behind. The Memphis player he pushed then turned around and (using both hands) punched/shoved the BYU player in the back of the head. As the BYU player turned his attention back to the attacker in an apparent attempt to retaliate he threw a punch and he was attacked by 3-4 Memphis players and an all out, bench-clearing brawl ensued. Punches and kicks were thrown by many players on both sides, one Memphis player even used a helmet as a weapon, and when it was over, numerous players walked off the field bloody and bruised. As the brawl was dying down a BYU player (Kai Nacua) can be seen coming into view and sucker punching a Memphis player (Alan Cross), who was not wearing a helmet, from behind. As the BYU player turned toward the camera's view, a bloodied bruise could be clearly seen from a punch he received while attempting to defend himself from another Memphis player earlier in the brawl.

=== Aftermath ===
Tom Holmoe, BYU's athletic director, apologized to BYU fans stating, "We expect better of our athletes, even in the face of a difficult loss. We intend to fully review this matter. I apologize to Cougar Nation." Memphis said in a statement via AAC commissioner Mike Aresco that they are displeased with the Miami Beach Bowl brawl, and that, "The university will respond accordingly following this detailed review. Needless to say, we are extremely disappointed that this happened, as we expect the highest standard of conduct from our student-athletes."

On January 20, 2015, The University of Memphis announced the completion of an internal review of the incident and expected punishments to be levied against twelve members of the team. BYU also took action to punish their players. Kai Nacua, Trey Dye, Sione Takitaki, and Tomasi Laulile were all suspended for BYU's season opener against Nebraska.
