= Jake Elliott =

American football player (born 1995)

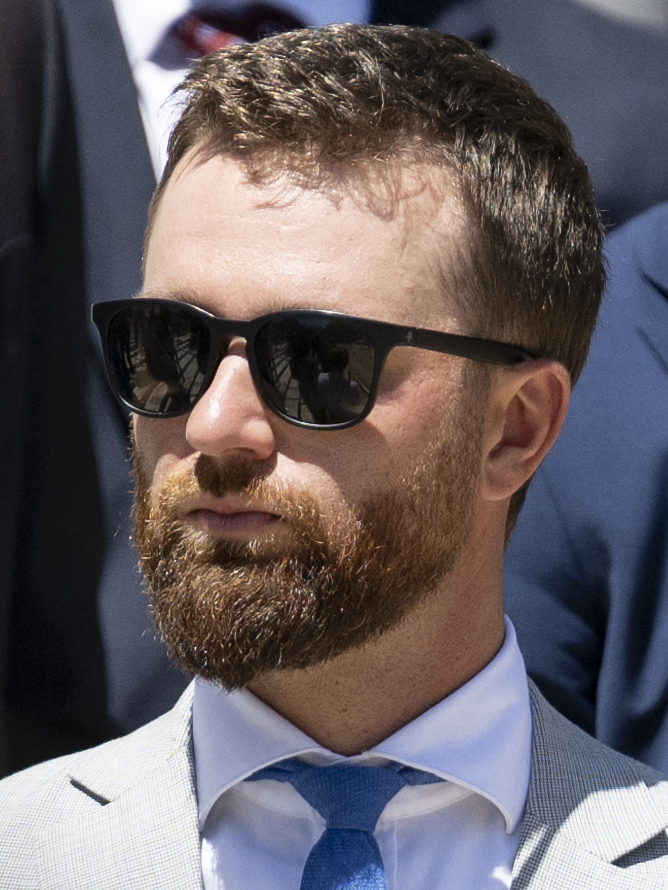
- Elliott in 2025

No. 4 – Philadelphia Eagles
- Position: Placekicker
- Roster status: Active

Personal information
- Born: January 21, 1995 (age 31); Western Springs, Illinois, U.S.
- Listed height: 5 ft 9 in (1.75 m)
- Listed weight: 167 lb (76 kg)

Career information
- High school: Lyons Township (La Grange, Illinois)
- College: Memphis (2013–2016)
- NFL draft: 2017: 5th round, 153rd overall pick

Career history
- Cincinnati Bengals (2017)*; Philadelphia Eagles (2017–present)
- * Offseason or practice squad member only

Awards and highlights
- 2× Super Bowl champion (LII, LIX); Second-team All-Pro (2023); Pro Bowl (2021); Second-team All-American (2015); 2× AAC Special Teams Player of the Year (2014, 2015)

Career NFL statistics as of Week 9, 2026
- Field goals made: 223
- Field goals attempted: 266
- Field goal %: 83.8%
- Extra points made: 376
- Extra points attempted: 390
- Extra point %: 96.4%
- Points: 1,045
- Longest field goal: 61
- Stats at Pro Football Reference

Jake Daniel Elliott (born January 21, 1995) is an American professional football placekicker for the Philadelphia Eagles of the National Football League (NFL). He played college football for the Memphis Tigers and was drafted by the Cincinnati Bengals in the fifth round of the 2017 NFL draft. Elliott was a member of the team that won Super Bowl LII. He holds the record for longest field goal by a rookie in NFL history (61 yards). Elliott was also part of the Eagles' winning team in Super Bowl LIX, converting all four of his field goal attempts, and setting a record for the most accurate performance by a kicker during a Super Bowl in NFL history.

== Early life ==
Elliott was born in Western Springs, Illinois, to Bruce and Diane Elliott. As a youth, he excelled in many sports, including baseball, basketball, and tennis. Elliott was considered among the state's best youth tennis players.

Elliott attended Lyons Township High School in La Grange, Illinois, and began playing football when a Lyons assistant coach noticed his talent at a Homecoming student field goal kicking contest. Before this, Elliott played tennis for three years at Lyons Township. Following his junior season, Elliott was an ESPNHS underclass and named First-team All-State by the Chicago Tribune. As a junior, he made a 52-yard field goal with no time remaining to narrowly beat Oak-Park River Forest High School 16–14. As a senior, Elliott made 15 of 21 field goals and was named Second-team kicker for Kohl's All America List. After his senior year, Elliott was offered a full scholarship by the University of North Dakota and the University of Memphis. He chose to play for the Memphis Tigers.

== College career ==
Elliott attended and played college football for Memphis from 2013 to 2016. During his time at Memphis, Elliott played under head coaches Justin Fuente, Darrell Dickey, and Mike Norvell.

As a freshman, Elliott was named the starting kicker after summer training. In his 2013 season, Elliott connected on 16 of 18 field goals. After his freshman season, Elliott led the Tigers with 72 points scored (24/24 extra points and 16/18 field goals). He set a Memphis record with his 56-yard field goal at USF, breaking the 2005 record of 53 yards set by Stephen Gostkowski. Elliott was named the American Athletic Conference (AAC) Special Teams Player of the Week and also one of three players to be named "Stars of the Week" by Lou Groza Award.

As a sophomore, Elliott led the AAC by averaging 9.2 points per game. For the second year in a row, he was named First-team All-Conference and Conference Special Teams Player of the Year. Elliott scored 120 points during his season, making 21 of 32 field goal attempts and converting all 57 extra-point attempts. His 21 successful field goals, 57 extra points, and 120 total points scored led the American Conference. During the 2014 Miami Beach Bowl, Elliott kicked the fourth-longest field goal in bowl game history, a 54-yard attempt that sent the game into a second overtime and led to a 55–48 victory.

As a junior, Elliott converted all 63 extra point attempts and 23 of 28 field goal attempts for a team-leading 132 points scored. His 63 extra points and 23 field goals led the conference in the 2015 season.

As a senior, Elliott converted all 58 extra point attempts and 21 of 26 field goal attempts for a team-leading 121 points. His 21 field goals tied him with Tulsa's Redford Jones for the conference lead. In his collegiate career, Elliott converted all 202 extra point attempts and 81 of 104 field goal attempts. At the end of the 2016 season, his successful collegiate career ranked him first in total points, extra points, and field goals while also finishing third in field goal percentage in conference history.

On February 9, 2017, it was announced that Elliott was entering the 2017 NFL draft.

== Professional career ==
Pre-draft measurables
Height	Weight	Arm length	Hand span	Wingspan	40-yard dash	10-yard split	20-yard split
5 ft 9 1/4 in (1.76 m)	167 lb (76 kg)	29 in (0.74 m)	9 in (0.23 m)	5 ft 7 1/2 in (1.71 m)	4.79 s	1.67 s	2.78 s
All values from NFL Combine

=== Cincinnati Bengals ===
The Cincinnati Bengals selected Elliott in the fifth round (153rd overall) of the 2017 NFL draft. He was the first of three kickers selected in 2017. Elliott competed with veteran Randy Bullock for the Bengals' kicker spot. On September 2, 2017, the team announced that Bullock had won the job, and waived Elliott. He was re-signed to the practice squad the next day.

=== Philadelphia Eagles ===
==== 2017 season ====
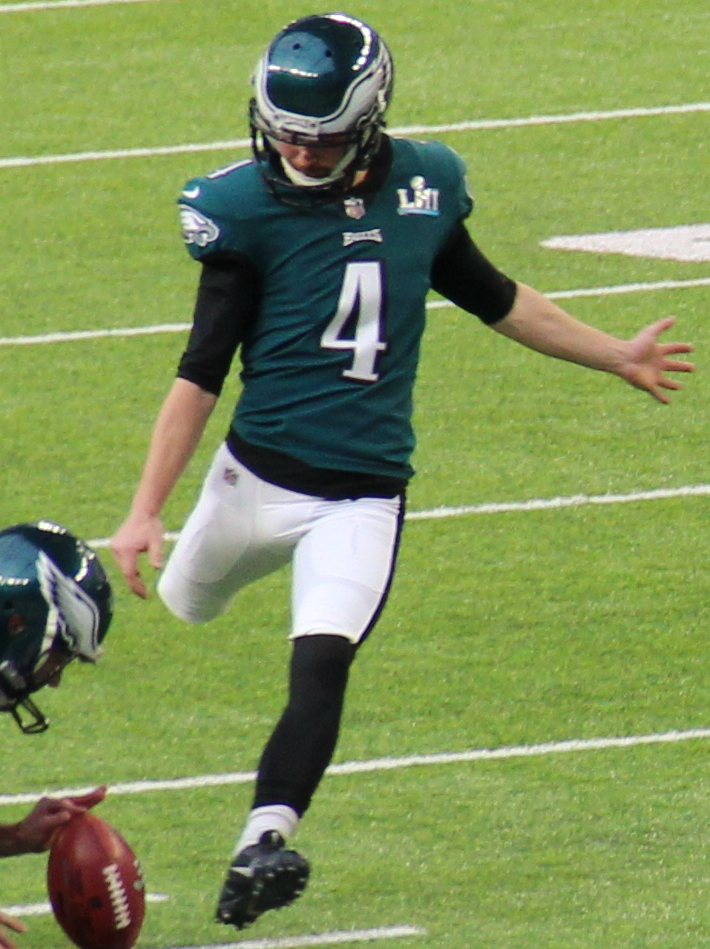
Elliott warming up in Super Bowl LII

On September 12, 2017, the Philadelphia Eagles signed Elliott off the Bengals' practice squad after the Eagles' starting kicker, Caleb Sturgis, was placed on injured reserve.

Elliott made his NFL debut during Week 2 against the Kansas City Chiefs. He converted both extra point attempts and two out of three field goal attempts. In the next game at Lincoln Financial Field in Philadelphia, Elliott kicked a 61-yard field goal to beat the New York Giants on the final play of the game, resulting in a 27–24 victory, earning him National Football Conference (NFC) Special Teams Player of the Week. It was tied for the 7th-longest field goal in NFL history, at the time. It was also the longest field goal in Eagles history, the longest ever kicked in Philadelphia in an NFL game, and the longest ever by an NFL rookie.

During Week 4 against the Los Angeles Chargers, Elliott put together a solid performance in converting all four field goal opportunities and both extra point attempts for a season-high 14 points scored. During Week 11 against the Dallas Cowboys, he made a tackle during the starting kick return. Elliott would later be pulled out of the game for a head injury and would not return.

The Eagles finished atop the NFC East with a 13–3 record and earned a first-round bye. Against the Atlanta Falcons in the Divisional Round, Elliott missed an extra point but converted three field goal attempts in the 15–10 victory. During the NFC Championship Game against the Minnesota Vikings, he converted all five extra point attempts and his lone field goal attempt in the 38–7 victory. In Super Bowl LII, Elliott missed his first of two extra point attempts, but made all three of his field goal attempts, including a 46-yard field goal in the fourth quarter that helped seal the Eagles' first Super Bowl victory over the New England Patriots.

==== 2018 season ====
In the 2018 season, Elliott converted 33 of 35 extra point attempts and 26 of 31 field goal attempts. During Week 12 against the Giants, he hit a go-ahead 43-yard field goal with 22 seconds remaining to be difference in the 25–22 victory. During Week 16 against the Houston Texans, Elliott converted a 35-yard field goal with no time remaining to give the Eagles a narrow 32–30 victory.

During the Wild Card Round against the Chicago Bears, he had an extra point and a field goal in the narrow 16–15 road victory. In the Divisional Round against the New Orleans Saints, Elliott had two extra points during the 20–14 road loss.

==== 2019 season ====
During Week 6 against the Minnesota Vikings, Elliott attempted a pass on a fake field goal attempt that was intercepted by Everson Griffen in the 38–20 loss. On November 27, 2019, Elliott signed a five-year, $21.8 million contract extension with the Eagles through the 2024 season, making him the third-highest paid kicker in the league.

==== 2020 season ====
In 2020, Elliott had the least productive season of his career, only attempting 19 field goals (converting 73.7%) and 26 extra-points (converting 92.3%). This was in part due to head coach Doug Pederson being more aggressive on 4th downs and 2-point conversions.

==== 2021 season ====
Elliott kicking a field goal against the Washington Football Team, 2021

During Week 1, Elliott went a perfect 8-for-8 on kicks, four field goals and four extra points, in a 40–29 victory over the Saints, earning NFC Special Teams Player of the Week. By the end of the season, he finished with his first year of converting 100% of his extra-point attempts with 44 makes, and Elliott broke the Eagles franchise record for the best field goal percentage in a single season at 90.9%.

On January 31, 2022, Elliott was named to his first Pro Bowl, replacing Matt Gay whose team had advanced to Super Bowl LVI.

==== 2022 season ====
During the regular-season finale, Elliott was a perfect six-for-six on kicks in a 22–16 win over the Giants to clinch the NFC East title, earning NFC Special Teams Player of the Week honors. In the 2022 season, he converted 51 of 53 extra point attempts and 20 of 23 field goal attempts. Elliott reached his second career Super Bowl when the Eagles defeated the San Francisco 49ers in the NFC Championship Game. During Super Bowl LVII, Elliott hit both his field goals, but the Eagles lost 38–35 to the Kansas City Chiefs. In three postseason games, Elliott converted all 12 extra point attempts and all four field goal attempts.

==== 2023 season ====
During the season opener, Elliott kicked four field goals and totaled 13 points in a 25–20 victory over the Patriots, earning NFC Special Teams Player of the Week. In the next game, he kicked a 61-yard field goal at halftime against the Minnesota Vikings, tying his all-time record. Two weeks later, Elliott kicked a game-winning 54-yard field goal in overtime against the Washington Commanders and was named NFC Special Teams Player of the Week for his performance. During Week 12, Elliott converted a 59-yard field goal against the Buffalo Bills in rainy and windy conditions to send the game into overtime and was named NFC Special Teams Player of the Week for his performance. In the 2023 season, he finished converting 45 of 46 extra point attempts and 30 of 32 field goal attempts.

==== 2024 season ====
On March 13, 2024, Elliott signed a four-year, $24 million contract extension with the Eagles. He finished the 2024 season converting 47 of 48 extra point attempts and 28 of 36 field goal attempts. Despite only making 77.8% of his kicks during the regular season, Elliott improved to make 90.9% of his attempts in the playoffs and was four-for-four, both with field goals and extra points respectively in Super Bowl LIX. Elliott accounted for 16 of the 40 points scored by Philadelphia in the Super Bowl victory over Kansas City, including a season-long field goal from 50 yards. Elliott is also only one of four Eagles to appear on both Super Bowl champion teams, along with Brandon Graham, Lane Johnson, and Rick Lovato.

==== 2025 season ====
In the first two weeks of the season, Elliott converted 58-yard field goals in both weeks after not making a kick of greater than 50 yards in his previous season. However, Elliott struggled in the second half of the season. He missed seven field goals and one extra point in the regular season, in addition to an extra point in the Wild Card Round against the San Francisco 49ers in the Eagles' 23–19 loss.

== Career statistics ==
=== NFL ===
Legend
	Won the Super Bowl
	Led the league
**Bold**	Career high

==== Regular season ====
General			Field goals					PATs			Kickoffs			Points
Season	Team	GP	FGM	FGA	FG%	Blck	Long	XPM	XPA	XP%	KO	Avg	TBs	Pts
2017	PHI	15	26	31	83.9	0	**61**	39	42	92.9	84	62.0	42	117
2018	PHI	16	26	31	83.9	0	56	33	35	94.3	82	63.5	57	111
2019	PHI	16	22	26	84.6	0	53	35	37	94.6	81	62.4	52	101
2020	PHI	16	14	19	73.7	0	54	24	26	92.3	73	61.8	46	66
2021	PHI	**17**	**30**	33	90.9	**1**	58	44	44	**100.0**	**96**	63.2	61	134
2022	PHI	16	20	23	87.0	**1**	56	**51**	**53**	96.2	91	**64.8**	63	111
2023	PHI	**17**	**30**	32	**93.8**	0	**61**	45	46	97.8	91	64.2	**73**	**135**
2024	PHI	**17**	28	**36**	77.8	**1**	50	47	48	97.9	11	64.9	9	131
2025	PHI	17	20	27	74.1	0	58	41	42	97.6	82	60.0	13	101
2026	PHI	9	7	8	87.5	0	58	17	17	100.0	33	59.0	6	38
Career		156	223	266	83.8	3	61	376	390	96.4	724	63.0	422	1,045

==== Postseason ====
General			Field goals					PATs			Kickoffs			Points
Season	Team	GP	FGM	FGA	FG%	Blck	Long	XPM	XPA	XP%	KO	Avg	TBs	Pts
2017	PHI	3	7	7	**100.0**	0	**53**	7	9	77.8	19	61.0	13	**28**
2018	PHI	2	1	1	**100.0**	0	43	3	3	**100.0**	7	62.0	2	6
2019	PHI	1	3	3	**100.0**	0	46	0	0	—	4	63.8	1	9
2021	PHI	1	0	0	—	0	—	1	1	**100.0**	3	45.7	1	1
2022	PHI	3	4	4	**100.0**	0	35	12	12	**100.0**	19	**65.5**	11	24
2023	PHI	1	1	1	**100.0**	0	47	0	0	—	3	65.0	3	3
2024	PHI	**4**	**10**	**11**	90.9	0	50	**13**	**16**	81.3	**32**	64.1	**18**	43
2025	PHI	1	2	2	**100.0**	0	41	1	2	50.0	5	58.2	3	7
Career		16	28	29	96.6	0	53	37	43	86.0	92	62.7	49	121

=== College ===
Year	School	Class	Games	XPM	XPA	XP%	FGM	FGA	FG%	Points
2013	Memphis	Freshman	12	24	24	100.0	16	18	88.9	72
2014	Memphis	Sophomore	13	57	57	100.0	21	32	65.6	120
2015	Memphis	Junior	13	63	63	100.0	23	28	82.1	132
2016	Memphis	Senior	13	58	58	100.0	21	26	80.8	121
**Career**			**51**	**202**	**202**	**100.0**	**81**	**104**	**77.9**	**445**

== Career highlights ==
=== Awards and honors ===
NFL

- 2× Super Bowl champion (LII, LIX)
- Second-team All-Pro (2023)
- Pro Bowl (2021)

College

- Second-team All-American (2015)
- 2× AAC Special Teams Player of the Year (2014, 2015)

=== Records ===
==== NFL records ====
- Longest field goal by a rookie: 61 yards

==== Eagles franchise records ====
- Best field goal percentage in a season (while playing in every game): 93.8%
- Longest field goal: 61 yards (twice)
- Most 50-plus yard field goals made in a season: 7
- Most career 50-plus yard field goals: 26
- Longest postseason field goal: 53 yards
- Longest Super Bowl field goal: 50 yards

== Personal life ==
On March 8, 2020, Elliott married his fiancée, Annie. Their son was born on July 29, 2023.
