= 2014 Memphis Tigers football team =

American college football season

2014 Memphis Tigers football

The American co-champion Miami Beach Bowl champion

Miami Beach Bowl, W 55–48^{2OT} vs. BYU
- Conference: American Athletic Conference

Ranking
- Coaches: No. 25
- AP: No. 25
- Record: 10–3 (7–1 The American)
- Head coach: Justin Fuente (3rd season)
- Offensive coordinator: Darrell Dickey (3rd season)
- Offensive scheme: Pro-style
- Defensive coordinator: Barry Odom (3rd season)
- Base defense: 4–3
- Home stadium: Liberty Bowl Memorial Stadium

2014 American Athletic Conference football standings
	Conf.			Overall
Team	W		L	W		L
No. 25 Memphis +	7	–	1	10	–	3
Cincinnati +	7	–	1	9	–	4
UCF +	7	–	1	9	–	4
East Carolina	5	–	3	8	–	5
Houston	5	–	3	8	–	5
Temple	4	–	4	6	–	6
South Florida	3	–	5	4	–	8
Tulane	2	–	6	3	–	9
Tulsa	2	–	6	2	–	10
UConn	1	–	7	2	–	10
SMU	1	–	7	1	–	11
+ – Conference co-champions; Rankings from AP Poll

The 2014 Memphis Tigers football team represented the University of Memphis in the 2014 NCAA Division I FBS football season. The Tigers were coached by third-year head coach Justin Fuente and played their home games at the Liberty Bowl Memorial Stadium in Memphis, Tennessee. The Tigers competed as a member of the American Athletic Conference. Memphis began the year with low expectations since they finished at the bottom of the American Athletic Conference and posted a 3–9 (1–7 The American) record in 2013. However, the Tigers turned completely around. First, they finished in a three-way tie with Cincinnati and UCF for the conference title by posting a 10–3 (7–1 The American) record. It was their first conference championship (shared) since 1971 when Memphis was part of the Missouri Valley Conference. The 2014 10-win season equaled the total number of wins Memphis posted over the 2010–2013 seasons. Also, the 10-win season was the first time Memphis had posted double digit wins in a season since 1938. The Tigers also won their first bowl game since 2005 by beating BYU 55–48 in double OT in the inaugural Miami Beach Bowl. Memphis also finished #25 in the final AP Poll for the first time ever.

== Schedule ==
Date	Time	Opponent	Site	TV	Result	Attendance
August 30	7:00 p.m.	Austin Peay*	Liberty Bowl Memorial Stadium; Memphis, TN	ESPN3	W 63–0	27,361
September 6	9:00 p.m.	at No. 11 UCLA*	Rose Bowl; Pasadena, CA	P12N	L 35–42	72,098
September 20	6:00 p.m.	Middle Tennessee*	Liberty Bowl Memorial Stadium; Memphis, TN	ESPN3	W 36–17	46,378
September 27	6:30 p.m.	at No. 10 Ole Miss*	Vaught–Hemingway Stadium; Oxford, MS (rivalry)	SECRN	L 3–24	61,291
October 4	6:00 p.m.	at Cincinnati	Paul Brown Stadium; Cincinnati, OH	CBSSN	W 41–14	25,456
October 11	6:00 p.m.	Houston	Liberty Bowl Memorial Stadium; Memphis, TN	CBSSN	L 24–28	32,784
October 25	11:00 a.m.	at SMU	Gerald J. Ford Stadium; University Park, TX	ESPNews	W 48–10	19,498
October 31	8:00 p.m.	Tulsa^{†}	Liberty Bowl Memorial Stadium; Memphis, TN	ESPNU	W 40–20	26,846
November 7	6:30 p.m.	at Temple	Lincoln Financial Field; Philadelphia, PA	ESPNU	W 16–13	23,882
November 15	2:30 p.m.	at Tulane	Yulman Stadium; New Orleans, LA	ESPNU	W 38–7	28,614
November 22	3:00 p.m.	South Florida	Liberty Bowl Memorial Stadium; Memphis, TN	ESPNews	W 31–20	34,635
November 29	3:00 p.m.	UConn	Liberty Bowl Memorial Stadium; Memphis, TN	ESPNews	W 41–10	35,102
December 22	1:00 p.m.	vs. BYU*	Marlins Park; Miami, FL (Miami Beach Bowl)	ESPN	W 55–48 ^{2OT}	20,761
*Non-conference game; ^{†}Homecoming; Rankings from AP Poll released prior to the game; All times are in Central time

== Rankings ==
Ranking movements Legend: ██ Increase in ranking ██ Decrease in ranking — = Not ranked RV = Received votes
	Week																
Poll	Pre	1	2	3	4	5	6	7	8	9	10	11	12	13	14	15	Final
AP	—	—	—	—	—	—	—	—	—	—	—	—	—	—	RV	RV	25
Coaches	—	RV	RV	RV	RV	—	RV	—	—	—	—	—	—	RV	RV	RV	25
CFP	Not released									—	—	—	—	—	—	—	Not released

== Game summaries ==
=== Austin Peay ===
	1	2	3	4	Total
Governors	0	0	0	0	0
Tigers	21	21	14	7	63

=== UCLA ===
	1	2	3	4	Total
Tigers	7	14	0	14	35
#11 Bruins	13	15	7	7	42

=== Middle Tennessee ===
	1	2	3	4	Total
Blue Raiders	7	0	3	7	17
Tigers	9	10	3	14	36

=== Ole Miss ===
	1	2	3	4	Total
Tigers	3	0	0	0	3
Rebels	7	0	0	17	24

=== Cincinnati ===
	1	2	3	4	Total
Tigers	24	3	14	0	41
Bearcats	7	0	7	0	14

=== Houston ===
	1	2	3	4	Total
Cougars	0	14	7	7	28
Tigers	7	14	0	3	24

=== SMU ===
	1	2	3	4	Total
Tigers	7	24	10	7	48
Mustangs	0	7	3	0	10

=== Tulsa ===
	1	2	3	4	Total
Golden Hurricane	7	7	0	6	20
Tigers	0	20	6	14	40

=== Temple ===
	1	2	3	4	Total
Tigers	0	10	3	3	16
Owls	10	0	0	3	13

=== Tulane ===
	1	2	3	4	Total
Tigers	7	3	21	7	38
Green Wave	0	0	0	7	7

=== South Florida ===
	1	2	3	4	Total
Bulls	3	10	0	7	20
Tigers	14	7	7	3	31

=== UConn ===
	1	2	3	4	Total
Huskies	0	3	0	7	10
Tigers	6	7	21	7	41

=== BYU (Miami Beach Bowl) ===
	1	2	3	4	OT	2OT	Total
Cougars	14	14	0	17	3	0	48
Tigers	17	7	14	7	3	7	55

== Depth chart ==
Defense

FS
39 Reggis Ball
⋅

WLB	ILB	ILB	SLB
13 Tank Jakes	34 Jackson Dillon	⋅	⋅
16 Wynton McManis	99 Kendrick Golden	⋅	⋅

SS
15 Fritz Etienne
17 Chris Morley

CB
10 Dontrell Nelson
12 Chauncey Lanier

DE	NT	DE
48 Ernest Suttles	56 Terry Redden	97 Martin Ifedi
91 Ricky Hunter	93 Cortez Crosby	14 Latarius Brady

CB
21 Bobby McCain
23 BJ Ross

Offense

"X" WR
87 Tevin Jones
83 Baniel Hurd

"Z" WR
7 Keiwone Malone
2 Joe Craig

LT	LG	C	RG	RT
77 Taylor Fallin	63 Tyler Uselton	71 Gabe Kuhn	75 Micheal Stannard	54 Al Bond
65 Christopher Roberson	76 Patrick Winfield	70 Micah Simmons	66 Tony Mays	79 Nykiren Wellington

WR
⋅
⋅

"S" WR
11 Sam Craft
5 Mose Frazier

QB
12 Paxton Lynch
15 Jason Stewart

RB
38 Brandon Hayes
22 Doroland Dorceus

Special teams
PK 46 Jake Elliot
PK 36 Spencer Smith
P 36 Spencer Smith
P 47 Nick Jacobs
KR 2 Joe Craig
PR 21 Bobby McCain
H 35 Evan Micheal
