= G. Derek West =

British historian (1922–2002)

Geoffrey Derek West (27 May 1922 – October 2002) was a British academic specialising in Medieval French and Arthurian literature, on which he authored two books and numerous articles. He also took a professional interest in American frontier and military history. He was a professor and dean at McMaster University, Ontario, for seventeen years, before retiring and returning to England.

West spent his retirement watching and writing about cricket. He authored several books and articles on the game, compiled a number of indices, and also acted as a consultant cricket historian.

== Books ==
- An Index of Proper Names in French Arthurian Verse Romances, 1150–1300. 1969
- An Index of Proper Names in French Arthurian Prose Romances. 1979
- The Elevens of England. London: Darf, 1988
- Twelve Days of Grace. London: Darf, 1989
- Six More Days of Grace. London: Darf, 1992
- Guide to Lillywhite's Cricketers' Companion. Oxford: North Moreton Press, 1995
