= Mose Frazier =

American football player (born 1993)

No. 14
- Position: Wide receiver

Personal information
- Born: August 30, 1993 (age 33); Memphis, Tennessee
- Listed height: 5 ft 11 in (1.80 m)
- Listed weight: 183 lb (83 kg)

Career information
- High school: Whitehaven (Memphis, Tennessee)
- College: Arkansas–Pine Bluff (2011); Memphis (2012–2015)
- NFL draft: 2016: undrafted

Career history
- Denver Broncos (2016)*; Buffalo Bills (2016)*; San Francisco 49ers (2016)*; Carolina Panthers (2017–2018)
- * Offseason or practice squad member only
- Stats at Pro Football Reference

Mose Frazier (born August 30, 1993) is an American former football wide receiver. He played college football at Memphis.

== Professional career ==
=== Denver Broncos ===
Frazier signed with the Denver Broncos as an undrafted free agent on May 3, 2016. He was waived on September 3, 2016, and was signed to the practice squad the next day. He was released on October 18, 2016.

=== Buffalo Bills ===
On October 25, 2016, Frazier was signed to the Buffalo Bills' practice squad. He was released by the team on November 4, 2016.

=== San Francisco 49ers ===
On November 8, 2016, Frazier was signed to the San Francisco 49ers' practice squad.

=== Carolina Panthers ===
On January 17, 2017, Frazier signed a reserve/future contract with the Carolina Panthers. He was waived on September 2, 2017, and was signed to the Panthers' practice squad the next day. He was promoted to the active roster on December 22, 2017.

On September 1, 2018, Frazier was waived by the Panthers and was signed to the practice squad the next day. He was promoted to the active roster on December 5, 2018.

On June 4, 2019, Frazier was waived/injured by the Panthers after suffering a broken arm in OTAs. He was released on June 12, 2019.
