= SMU Mustangs football statistical leaders =

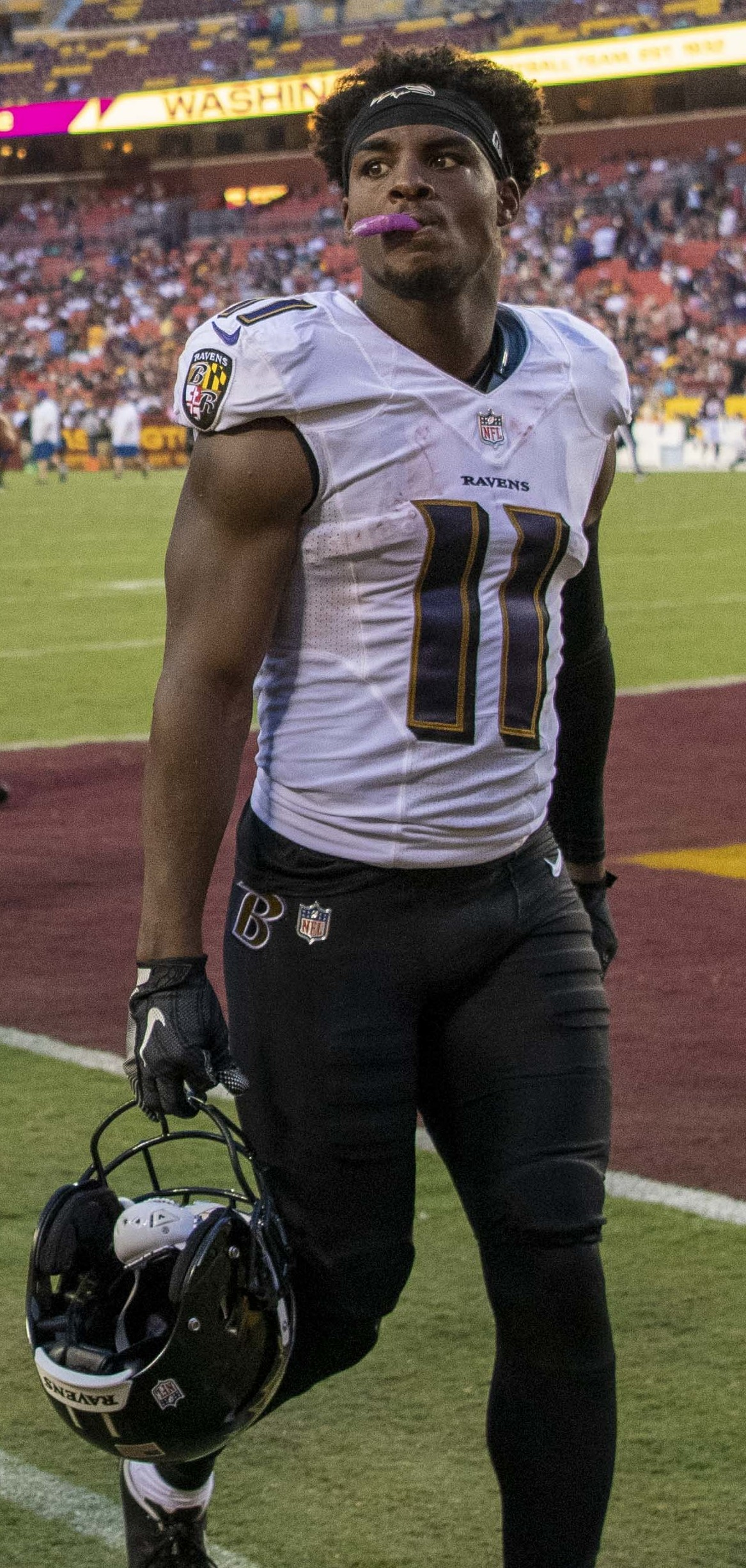
James Proche became the Mustangs' career leader in all major receiving categories in 2019.

The SMU Mustangs football statistical leaders are individual statistical leaders of the SMU Mustangs football program in various categories, including passing, rushing, receiving, total offense, defensive stats, kicking, and scoring. Within those areas, the lists identify single-game, single-season, and career leaders. Since the 2024 season, the Mustangs have represented Southern Methodist University in the NCAA Division I FBS Atlantic Coast Conference.

Although SMU began competing in intercollegiate football in 1915, the school's official record book considers the "modern era" to have begun in 1945. Records from before this year are often incomplete and inconsistent, and they are generally not included in these lists.

These lists are dominated by more recent players for several reasons:

- Since 1945, seasons have increased from 10 games to 11 and then 12 games in length.
- The NCAA didn't allow freshmen to play varsity football until 1972 (with the exception of the World War II years), allowing players to have four-year careers.
- Bowl games only began counting toward single-season and career statistics in 2002. The Mustangs have played in eight bowl games since this decision, (Note: SMU had been scheduled to play in bowl games in 2020 and 2021, but both were canceled due to COVID-19 issues.) giving many recent players an extra game to accumulate statistics. SMU also played a first-round game in the 2024–25 College Football Playoff.
- Since 2018, players have been allowed to participate in as many as four games in a redshirt season; previously, playing in even one game "burned" the redshirt. Since 2024, postseason games have not counted against the four-game limit. These changes to redshirt rules have given very recent players several extra games to accumulate statistics.
- The American Conference, (Note: Known before 2025 as the American Athletic Conference.) in which SMU played from 2013 to 2023, has held a championship game since 2015. SMU played in that game in 2023, giving players in that season yet another game to compile statistics. The Mustangs' current home of the ACC also holds a championship game, and SMU played in that game in its first ACC season in 2024.
- Due to COVID-19 disruptions, the NCAA ruled that the 2020 season would not be counted against any football player's athletic eligibility, giving players active in that season five years of eligibility instead of the standard four.

These lists are updated through Week 12 of the 2026 season. Players active in 2026 are in bold.

== Passing ==
=== Passing yards ===
Career
Rk	Player	Yards	Years
1	**Kevin Jennings**	10,898	2022 2023 2024 2025 2026
2	Ben Hicks	9,081	2016 2017 2018
3	Chuck Hixson	7,179	1968 1969 1970
4	Tanner Mordecai	7,152	2021 2022
5	Shane Buechele	7,024	2019 2020
6	Garrett Gilbert	6,460	2012 2013
7	Mike Ford	6,239	1977 1978 1979 1980
8	Mike Romo	6,041	1989 1990 1991 1992
9	Kyle Padron	5,902	2009 2010 2011
10	Ramon Flanigan	5,640	1992 1993 1994 1995 1996 1997

Single season
Rk	Player	Yards	Year
1	Shane Buechele	3,929	2019
2	Kyle Padron	3,828	2010
3	Kevin Jennings	3,641	2025
4	Tanner Mordecai	3,628	2021
5	Ben Hicks	3,569	2017
6	Garrett Gilbert	3,528	2013
7	Tanner Mordecai	3,524	2022
8	J. J. McDermott	3,421	2011
9	Kevin Jennings	3,245	2024
10	**Kevin Jennings**	3,189	2026

Single game
Rk	Player	Yards	Year	Opponent
1	Garrett Gilbert	538	2013	Temple
2	Garrett Gilbert	484	2013	Rutgers
3	Shane Buechele	474	2020	Memphis
4	Kevin Jennings	464	2026	Missouri State
5	Kyle Padron	460	2009	Nevada
6	Shane Buechele	457	2019	Temple
7	Shane Buechele	456	2019	Memphis
8	Mike Romo	450	1989	North Texas
9	Mike Romo	449	1990	Rice
10	Tanner Mordecai	432	2022	North Texas

=== Passing touchdowns ===
Career
Rk	Player	TDs	Years
1	**Kevin Jennings**	81	2022 2023 2024 2025 2026
2	Tanner Mordecai	72	2021 2022
3	Ben Hicks	71	2016 2017 2018
4	Shane Buechele	57	2019 2020
5	Justin Willis	51	2006 2007 2008
6	Kyle Padron	41	2009 2010 2011
7	Chuck Hixson	40	1968 1969 1970
8	Bo Levi Mitchell	36	2008 2009
	Garrett Gilbert	36	2012 2013
10	Mike Romo	35	1989 1990 1991 1992
	Preston Stone	35	2021 2022 2023 2024

Single season
Rk	Player	TDs	Year
1	Tanner Mordecai	39	2021
2	Shane Buechele	34	2019
3	Tanner Mordecai	33	2022
	Ben Hicks	33	2017
5	Kyle Padron	31	2010
6	Preston Stone	28	2023
7	Justin Willis	26	2006
	Kevin Jennings	26	2025
	**Kevin Jennings**	26	2026
10	Justin Willis	25	2007

Single game
Rk	Player	TDs	Year	Opponent
1	Tanner Mordecai	9	2022	Houston
2	Tanner Mordecai	7	2021	Abilene Christian
3	Mike Romo	6	1990	Vanderbilt
	Shane Buechele	6	2019	Temple
5	Justin Willis	5	2006	Sam Houston State
	Bo Levi Mitchell	5	2008	Texas State
	Garrett Gilbert	5	2013	Rutgers
	Shane Buechele	5	2019	East Carolina
	Tanner Mordecai	5	2021	Louisiana Tech
	Preston Stone	5	2023	Prairie View A&M
	**Kevin Jennings**	5	2026	UC Davis

== Rushing ==
=== Rushing yards ===
Career
Rk	Player	Yards	Years
1	Eric Dickerson	4,450	1979 1980 1981 1982
2	Zach Line	4,185	2009 2010 2011 2012
3	Reggie Dupard	3,772	1982 1983 1984 1985
4	Craig James	3,743	1979 1980 1981 1982
5	Xavier Jones	3,438	2015 2016 2017 2018 2019
6	Jeff Atkins	3,260	1983 1984 1985 1986
7	Wayne Morris	3,044	1972 1973 1974 1975
8	Keylon Kincade	3,038	2000 2001 2002 2003
9	Donte Womack	2,790	1994 1995 1996 1997
10	Alvin Maxson	2,734	1971 1972 1973

Single season
Rk	Player	Yards	Year
1	Eric Dickerson	1,617	1982
2	Zach Line	1,494	2010
3	Eric Dickerson	1,428	1981
4	Brashard Smith	1,332	2024
5	Keylon Kincade	1,280	2003
6	Keylon Kincade	1,279	2002
7	Reggie Dupard	1,278	1985
	Zach Line	1,278	2012
9	Xavier Jones	1,276	2019
10	Reggie Dupard	1,249	1983

Single game
Rk	Player	Yards	Year	Opponent
1	Mike Richardson	244	1968	Texas A&M
2	ShanDerrick Charles	243	2001	San Jose State
3	Eric Dickerson	241	1982	Houston
4	Ulysses Bentley IV	227	2020	North Texas
5	Craig James	225	1980	BYU
6	Braeden West	220	2016	Liberty
7	Jeff Atkins	218	1983	Rice
8	Donte Womack	212	1997	Arkansas
	ShanDerrick Charles	212	2001	UTEP
10	Wayne Morris	202	1975	Texas
	Zach Line	202	2010	Marshall

=== Rushing touchdowns ===
Career
Rk	Player	TDs	Years
1	Eric Dickerson	47	1979 1980 1981 1982
	Zach Line	47	2009 2010 2011 2012
3	Xavier Jones	45	2015 2016 2017 2018 2019
4	Reggie Dupard	41	1982 1983 1984 1985
5	Doak Walker	31	1945 1947 1948 1949
6	Ramon Flanigan	27	1992 1993 1994 1995 1996 1997
7	Ke'Mon Freeman	26	2016 2017 2018 2019
8	Tyler Lavine	25	2019 2020 2021 2022 2023
9	Kyle Rote	24	1948 1949 1950
	Alvin Maxson	24	1971 1972 1973

Single season
Rk	Player	TDs	Year
1	Xavier Jones	23	2019
2	Eric Dickerson	19	1981
3	Eric Dickerson	17	1982
	Zach Line	17	2011
5	Redman Hume	16	1927
	Reggie Dupard	16	1984
7	Reggie Dupard	14	1985
	Brashard Smith	14	2024

Single game
Rk	Player	TDs	Year	Opponent
1	Zach Line	5	2011	Northwestern State
2	Multiple players	4	Most recent: ShanDerrick Charles, 2001 vs. UTEP	

== Receiving ==
=== Receptions ===
Career
Rk	Player	Rec	Years
1	James Proche	301	2016 2017 2018 2019
2	Emmanuel Sanders	285	2006 2007 2008 2009
3	Cole Beasley	255	2008 2009 2010 2011
4	Jason Wolf	235	1989 1990 1991 1992
5	Rashee Rice	233	2019 2020 2021 2022
6	Darius Johnson	232	2009 2010 2011 2012
7	Jeremy Johnson	196	2010 2011 2012 2013
8	Mick Rossley	186	1991 1992 1993 1994
9	Aldrick Robinson	181	2007 2008 2009 2010
10	Darius Joseph	174	2012 2013 2014 2015

Single season
Rk	Player	Rec	Year
1	Trey Quinn	114	2017
2	Jeremy Johnson	112	2013
3	James Proche	111	2019
4	Darius Joseph	103	2013
5	Emmanuel Sanders	98	2009
6	Rashee Rice	96	2022
7	James Proche	93	2018
8	Cole Beasley	87	2010
9	Cole Beasley	86	2011
10	Mick Rossley	83	1994

Single game
Rk	Player	Rec	Year	Opponent
1	Emmanuel Sanders	18	2009	Washington State
	Jeremy Johnson	18	2013	Rutgers
3	Trey Quinn	17	2017	Houston
	Trey Quinn	17	2017	Cincinnati
5	Jerry LeVias	15	1968	Ohio State
	Trey Quinn	15	2017	UConn
7	Emanuel Tolbert	14	1977	Arkansas
	Jason Wolf	14	1992	Arkansas
	James Proche	14	2019	East Carolina
10	Emanuel Tolbert	13	1978	Baylor
	Michael Bowen	13	1990	Rice
	Jason Wolf	13	1990	Arkansas
	Emmanuel Sanders	13	2007	Memphis
	Darius Joseph	13	2014	East Carolina
	Courtland Sutton	13	2016	South Florida
	James Proche	13	2019	Memphis
	Rashee Rice	13	2022	Memphis

=== Receiving yards ===
Career
Rk	Player	Yards	Years
1	James Proche	3,949	2016 2017 2018 2019
2	Emmanuel Sanders	3,791	2006 2007 2008 2009
3	Aldrick Robinson	3,314	2007 2008 2009 2010
4	Courtland Sutton	3,220	2014 2015 2016 2017
5	Rashee Rice	3,111	2019 2020 2021 2022
6	Cole Beasley	2,959	2008 2009 2010 2011
7	Darius Johnson	2,854	2009 2010 2011 2012
8	Emanuel Tolbert	2,784	1976 1977 1978 1979
9	Reggie Roberson Jr.	2,704	2018 2019 2020 2021
10	Ron Morris	2,410	1983 1984 1985 1986

Single season
Rk	Player	Yards	Year
1	Rashee Rice	1,355	2022
2	Emmanuel Sanders	1,339	2009
3	Aldrick Robinson	1,301	2010
4	Courtland Sutton	1,246	2016
5	James Proche	1,225	2019
6	James Proche	1,199	2018
7	Trey Quinn	1,191	2017
8	Jerry LeVias	1,131	1968
9	Darius Johnson	1,118	2011
10	Jeremy Johnson	1,112	2013

Single game
Rk	Player	Yards	Year	Opponent
1	Courtland Sutton	252	2016	South Florida
2	Reggie Roberson Jr.	250	2019	Temple
3	Reggie Roberson Jr.	243	2020	Memphis
4	Jeremy Johnson	217	2013	Rutgers
5	Jerry LeVias	213	1968	NC State
6	Aldrick Robinson	210	2008	UCF
7	Keenan Holman	209	2013	Temple
8	Rashee Rice	193	2022	Maryland
9	Aldrick Robinson	186	2008	Houston
	Trey Quinn	186	2017	Cincinnati

=== Receiving touchdowns ===
Career
Rk	Player	TDs	Years
1	James Proche	39	2016 2017 2018 2019
2	Emmanuel Sanders	34	2006 2007 2008 2009
3	Courtland Sutton	31	2014 2015 2016 2017
4	Aldrick Robinson	30	2007 2008 2009 2010
5	Emanuel Tolbert	25	1976 1977 1978 1979
	Rashee Rice	25	2019 2020 2021 2022
7	Reggie Roberson Jr.	23	2018 2019 2020 2021
8	Jerry LeVias	22	1966 1967 1968
9	Darius Johnson	20	2009 2010 2011 2012
10	RJ Maryland	19	2022 2023 2024 2025

Single season
Rk	Player	TDs	Year
1	James Proche	15	2019
2	Aldrick Robinson	14	2010
3	Trey Quinn	13	2017
4	Courtland Sutton	12	2017
	James Proche	12	2018
6	Emanuel Tolbert	11	1978
	Aldrick Robinson	11	2008
8	Zack Sledge	10	2007
	Courtland Sutton	10	2016
	Rashee Rice	10	2022

Single game
Rk	Player	TDs	Year	Opponent
1	Emanuel Tolbert	4	1978	Baylor
	Courtland Sutton	4	2017	North Texas
3	Multiple players	3	Most recent: Yamir Knight, 2026 vs. Virginia Tech	

== Total offense ==
Total offense is the sum of passing and rushing statistics. It does not include receiving or returns.

=== Total offense yards ===
Career
Rk	Player	Yards	Years
1	**Kevin Jennings**	11,577	2022 2023 2024 2025 2026
2	Ben Hicks	8,977	2016 2017 2018
3	Tanner Mordecai	7,454	2021 2022
4	Ramon Flanigan	7,437	1992 1993 1994 1995 1996 1997
5	Shane Buechele	7,234	2019 2020
6	Garrett Gilbert	7,063	2012 2013
7	Chuck Hixson	6,884	1968 1969 1970
8	Kyle Padron	6,189	2009 2010 2011
9	Mike Ford	6,055	1977 1978 1979 1980
10	Justin Willis	6,054	2006 2007 2008

Single season
Rk	Player	Yards	Year
1	Kyle Padron	4,072	2010
2	Shane Buechele	4,034	2019
3	J. J. McDermott	3,911	2011
4	Tanner Mordecai	3,830	2021
5	Garrett Gilbert	3,795	2013
6	Kevin Jennings	3,695	2025
7	Justin Willis	3,643	2007
8	Tanner Mordecai	3,624	2022
9	Ben Hicks	3,616	2017
10	Kevin Jennings	3,599	2024

Single game
Rk	Player	Yards	Year	Opponent
1	Garrett Gilbert	635	2013	Temple
2	Shane Buechele	501	2020	Memphis
3	Garrett Gilbert	498	2013	Rutgers
4	Justin Willis	489	2007	Memphis
5	Kyle Padron	467	2009	Nevada
	Kevin Jennings	467	2026	Missouri State
7	Kevin Jennings	463	2026	Florida State
8	Tanner Mordecai	461	2021	Tulane
9	Shane Buechele	453	2019	Temple
10	Tanner Mordecai	446	2021	Louisiana Tech

=== Touchdowns responsible for ===
In official NCAA records, "touchdowns responsible for" includes rushing and passing touchdowns, but not receptions or returns—the same statistical categories used to measure total offense.

Career
Rk	Player	TDs	Years
1	**Kevin Jennings**	93	2022 2023 2024 2025 2026
2	Tanner Mordecai	76	2021 2022
3	Ben Hicks	74	2016 2017 2018
4	Shane Buechele	61	2019 2020
5	Ramon Flanigan	57	1992 1993 1994 1995 1996 1997
	Justin Willis	57	2006 2007 2008
7	Chuck Hixson	50	1968 1969 1970
	Garrett Gilbert	50	2012 2013
9	Kyle Padron	48	2009 2010 2011
10	Eric Dickerson	47	1979 1980 1981 1982
	Zach Line	47	2009 2010 2011 2012

Single season
Rk	Player	TDs	Year
1	Tanner Mordecai	41	2021
2	Shane Buechele	36	2019
3	Kyle Padron	35	2010
	Tanner Mordecai	35	2022
5	Ben Hicks	33	2017
6	Preston Stone	32	2023
7	Kevin Jennings	30	2025
8	Justin Willis	29	2006
9	Justin Willis	28	2007
	Kevin Jennings	28	2024
	**Kevin Jennings**	28	2026

Single game
Rk	Player	TDs	Year	Opponent
1	Tanner Mordecai	10	2022	Houston
2	Garrett Gilbert	7	2013	Rutgers
	Tanner Mordecai	7	2021	Abilene Christian
4	Mike Romo	6	1990	Vanderbilt
	Justin Willis	6	2006	Sam Houston State
	Garrett Gilbert	6	2013	Temple
	Shane Buechele	6	2019	Temple
	Preston Stone	6	2023	Prairie View A&M
9	11 times by 8 players	5	Most recent: **Kevin Jennings**, 2026 vs. UC Davis	

== Defense ==
=== Interceptions ===
Career
Rk	Player	Ints	Years
1	Russell Carter	18	1980 1981 1982 1983
2	John Simmons	17	1977 1978 1979 1980
3	Paul Page	15	1945 1946 1947 1948
4	Wes Hopkins	14	1979 1980 1981 1982
5	Pat Curry	13	1969 1970 1971
	David Hill	13	1975 1976 1977 1978
7	Tracy Hart	12	1996 1997 1998 1999

Single season
Rk	Player	Ints	Year
1	Jim Livingston	8	1968
2	Paul Page	7	1947
	Pat Curry	7	1969
	David Hill	7	1978
	John Simmons	7	1980
	Russell Carter	7	1981
	Russell Carter	7	1983

Single game
Rk	Player	Ints	Year	Opponent
1	John Hughes	4	1962	Rice
	Wes Hopkins	4	1981	Houston
3	Paul Page	3	1947	Texas A&M
	David Powell	3	1950	Oklahoma A&M
	Jim Livingston	3	1968	NC State
	David Hill	3	1978	Ohio State
	Cornell Parker	3	1995	Texas
	Devin Lowery	3	2006	Marshall

=== Tackles ===
Career
Rk	Player	Tackles	Years
1	Putt Choate	649	1975 1976 1977 1978
2	Gary Moten	455	1979 1980 1981 1982
3	Bill Kiely	445	1989 1990 1991 1992
4	Jason Bednarz	423	1989 1990 1991 1992
5	Chris Bordano	421	1993 1994 1995 1996 1997

Single season
Rk	Player	Tackles	Year
1	Putt Choate	253	1978
2	Putt Choate	186	1977
3	Craig Swann	167	1995
4	Louie Kelcher	161	1974
5	Putt Choate	150	1976

Single game
Rk	Player	Tackles	Year	Opponent
1	Champ Dickerson	32	1977	Ohio State
2	Putt Choate	31	1976	Texas A&M
3	Putt Choate	28	1978	Penn State
4	Putt Choate	27	1977	Texas A&M
	Clarence Bennett	27	1980	Houston

=== Sacks ===
Career
Rk	Player	Sacks	Years
1	Luke Johnson	23.5	1997 1998 1999
2	Isaiah Smith	23.0	2022 2023 2024 2025
3	Ja'Gared Davis	20.5	2009 2010 2011 2012
	Justin Lawler	20.5	2014 2015 2016 2017
5	Justin Rogers	19.5	2003 2004 2005 2006
6	Anthony Beverley	19.0	1981 1982 1983 1984
7	Chad Patton	18.0	1990 1991 1992 1993
	Taylor Thompson	18.0	2008 2009 2010 2011
	Delontae Scott	18.0	2016 2017 2018 2019
10	Jerry Ball	17.0	1983 1984 1985 1986
	Elijah Roberts	17.0	2023 2024

Single season
Rk	Player	Sacks	Year
1	Patrick Nelson	12.5	2019
2	Luke Johnson	11.5	1999
3	Victor Simon	11.0	1981
4	Gary Nelson	10.0	1978
	Luke Johnson	10.0	1997
	Delontae Scott	10.0	2019
7	Justin Rogers	9.5	2006
	Justin Lawler	9.5	2017
	Elijah Roberts	9.5	2023

Single game
Rk	Player	Sacks	Year	Opponent
1	Luke Johnson	4.0	1999	UTEP
	Justin Lawler	4.0	2017	UConn
	Isaiah Smith	4.0	2025	Boston College

== Kicking ==
=== Field goals made ===
Career
Rk	Player	FGs	Years
1	**Collin Rogers**	61	2022 2023 2024 2025
2	Eddie Garcia	44	1978 1979 1980 1981
	Chase Hover	44	2011 2012 2013
4	Thomas Morstead	37	2005 2006 2007 2008
5	Chris McMurtray	36	2002 2003 2004 2005
6	Josh Williams	31	2016 2017
7	Brandy Brownlee	30	1984 1985 1986
8	Chipper Johnson	26	1969 1970 1971
	Jeff Harrell	26	1982 1983

Single season
Rk	Player	FGs	Year
1	**Collin Rogers**	24	2024
2	**Collin Rogers**	20	2023
3	Eddie Garcia	18	1981
	Chris McMurtray	18	2005
	Chase Hover	18	2012
	Chase Hover	18	2013
7	Josh Williams	17	2016
	Chris Naggar	17	2020
9	**Collin Rogers**	16	2022
10	Brandy Brownlee	15	1985
	Daniel Hernández	15	1996

Single game
Rk	Player	FGs	Year	Opponent
1	**Collin Rogers**	5	2024	BYU
2	Eddie Garcia	4	1981	Arkansas
	Brandy Brownlee	4	1985	Rice
	Daniel Hernández	4	1996	TCU
	Chris McMurtray	4	2005	UTEP
	Chase Hover	4	2012	Tulane
	Josh Williams	4	2016	Tulsa
	**Collin Rogers**	4	2023	Tulane (American Championship Game)

=== Field goal percentage ===
SMU's football record book does not list a full top 10 for either career or single-season accuracy, listing only the career leader and the single-season top three. However, the Sports-Reference website lists all SMU players since 2000 with at least one career field goal, with the list sortable by any relevant career statistic, including accuracy.

Career (Note: Minimum of 30 attempts.)
Rk	Player	FG%	Years
1	Chris McMurtray	75.0%	2002 2003 2004 2005

Single season (Note: Minimum of 10 attempts.)
Rk	Player	FG%	Year
1	Chase Hover	85.7%	2013
2	Eddie Garcia	81.8%	1981
	Chris McMurtray	81.8%	2005

== Scoring ==
=== Total points ===
Career
Rk	Player	Pts	Years
1	**Collin Rogers**	371	2022 2023 2024 2025
2	Doak Walker	288	1945 1947 1948 1949
	Eric Dickerson	288	1979 1980 1981 1982
	Xavier Jones	288	2015 2016 2017 2018 2019
5	Zach Line	282	2009 2010 2011 2012
6	Eddie Garcia	262	1978 1979 1980 1981
7	Reggie Dupard	258	1982 1983 1984 1985
8	Chase Hover	250	2011 2012 2013
9	James Proche	236	2016 2017 2018 2019
10	Thomas Morstead	217	2005 2006 2007 2008

Single season
Rk	Player	Pts	Year
1	Xavier Jones	150	2019
2	**Collin Rogers**	126	2023
3	**Collin Rogers**	124	2024
4	Eric Dickerson	114	1981
5	Brashard Smith	112	2024
6	Redman Hume	109	1927
7	**Collin Rogers**	106	2022
8	Eric Dickerson	102	1982
	Zach Line	102	2011
10	Chase Hover	101	2012

Single game
Rk	Player	Pts	Year	Opponent
1	Zach Line	30	2011	Northwestern State
2	12 times by 12 players	24	Most recent: Brashard Smith, 2024 vs. TCU	

=== Total touchdowns ===
These lists include touchdowns scored by each individual player, thus including rushing, receiving, and return touchdowns but not passing touchdowns. SMU does not break down its lists of total touchdown leaders by type of play. It lists only the top 8 for career touchdowns and top 6 for single-season touchdowns.

Career
Rk	Player	TDs	Years
1	Eric Dickerson	48	1979 1980 1981 1982
	Xavier Jones	48	2015 2016 2017 2018 2019
3	Zach Line	47	2009 2010 2011 2012
4	Reggie Dupard	43	1982 1983 1984 1985
5	James Proche	39	2016 2017 2018 2019
6	Doak Walker	38	1945 1947 1948 1949
7	Emmanuel Sanders	35	2006 2007 2008 2009
8	Redman Hume	34	1926 1927 1928
9	Courtland Sutton	32	2014 2015 2016 2017
10	Aldrick Robinson	30	2007 2008 2009 2010

Single season
Rk	Player	TDs	Year
1	Xavier Jones	25	2019
2	Eric Dickerson	19	1981
3	Brashard Smith	18	2024
4	Redman Hume	17	1927
	Eric Dickerson	17	1982
	Zach Line	17	2011
7	Reggie Dupard	16	1984
	Reggie Dupard	16	1985

Single game
Rk	Player	TDs	Year	Opponent
1	Zach Line	5	2011	Northwestern State
2	12 times by 12 players	4	Most recent: Courtland Sutton, 2017 vs. North Texas	
