= List of SMU Mustangs in the NFL draft =

This is a list of SMU Mustangs football players in the NFL draft.

== Key ==
B	Back	K	Kicker	NT	Nose tackle
C	Center	LB	Linebacker	FB	Fullback
DB	Defensive back	P	Punter	HB	Halfback
DE	Defensive end	QB	Quarterback	WR	Wide receiver
DT	Defensive tackle	RB	Running back	G	Guard
E	End	T	Offensive tackle	TE	Tight end

== Selections ==
Year	Round	Pick	Overall	Player	Team	Position
1936	4	3	30	Truman Spain	Pittsburgh Steelers	T
1936	5	1	37	Harry Shuford	Philadelphia Eagles	B
1936	5	4	40	Bob Wilson	Brooklyn Dodgers	B
1936	6	3	48	Maurice Orr	Pittsburgh Steelers	T
1936	9	7	79	J. C. Wetsel	Green Bay Packers	G
1937	2	5	15	Bob Finley	Pittsburgh Steelers	B
1937	7	7	67	John Sprague	Detroit Lions	E
1939	4	4	29	Billy Dewell	Philadelphia Eagles	E
1939	11	9	99	Charley Sprague	Green Bay Packers	E
1939	17	10	160	Jack Sanders	New York Giants	T
1941	4	3	28	Johnny Clement	Chicago Cardinals	B
1941	10	3	83	Ray Mallouf	Chicago Cardinals	B
1941	18	3	163	Fred Harris	Chicago Cardinals	T
1942	7	9	59	Preston Johnston	Green Bay Packers	B
1942	20	9	189	Horace Young	Green Bay Packers	B
1943	9	4	74	Ray Rason	Brooklyn Dodgers	G
1943	18	4	164	Clarence Booth	Chicago Cardinals	T
1943	22	9	209	Orville Johnson	Chicago Bears	G
1944	5	8	40	Abe Croft	Chicago Bears	E
1944	13	2	122	Jim Wright	Brooklyn Dodgers	C
1944	17	2	166	Howard Maley	Brooklyn Dodgers	B
1944	32	1	325	Abel Gonzales	Green Bay Packers	B
1945	2	4	15	Tom Dean	Boston Yanks	T
1945	3	6	22	Charley Allen	Chicago Bears	B
1945	6	7	50	Wayne Shaw	Chicago Bears	B
1945	21	8	216	Sid Halliday	Washington Redskins	T
1945	23	6	236	Gabby Martin	Washington Redskins	E
1945	24	11	252	Lloyd Baxter	Green Bay Packers	C
1946	27	1	251	Jesse Herschbarger	Chicago Cardinals	E
1947	6	5	40	Gene Wilson	Green Bay Packers	E
1947	13	5	110	John Hamberger	Philadelphia Eagles	T
1947	17	9	154	Frank Pullatie	New York Giants	B
1948	3	4	17	Earl Cook	Boston Yanks	G
1948	11	8	93	Gil Johnson	Philadelphia Eagles	QB
1948	26	9	244	Bob Ramsey	Pittsburgh Steelers	B
1949	1	3	3	Doak Walker	Boston Yanks	RB
1949	1	4	4	Paul Page	New York Giants	B
1949	2	10	21	Dick McKissack	Chicago Cardinals	B
1949	6	3	54	Joe Ethridge	Green Bay Packers	T
1949	14	5	136	Dave Moon	Pittsburgh Steelers	B
1949	18	3	174	Floyd Lewis	Green Bay Packers	G
1949	19	2	183	Bobby Folsom	Green Bay Packers	E
1950	5	1	54	Jack Halliday	Baltimore Colts	G
1950	5	11	64	Dick McKissack	Los Angeles Rams	B
1950	18	11	233	Bobby Collier	Los Angeles Rams	T
1950	30	3	381	Ray Mallouf	Green Bay Packers	B
1951	1	1	1	Kyle Rote	New York Giants	B
1951	8	11	97	Fred Benners	New York Giants	B
1951	21	6	249	Neal Franklin	Philadelphia Eagles	T
1951	23	12	279	Johnny Champion	Cleveland Browns	B
1951	28	11	338	Hal Quinn	New York Giants	G
1952	4	6	43	Dick Hightower	Washington Redskins	C
1952	7	10	83	Val Joe Walker	New York Giants	B
1952	8	11	96	Herschel Forester	Cleveland Browns	G
1952	10	10	119	Pat Knight	New York Giants	E
1952	27	3	316	I. D. Russell	Green Bay Packers	B
1952	27	6	319	Ben White	Washington Redskins	E
1953	3	6	31	Bill Forester	Green Bay Packers	T
1954	7	8	81	Jerry Norton	Philadelphia Eagles	B
1954	7	11	84	Don Miller	Cleveland Browns	B
1954	10	10	119	Don Goss	Cleveland Browns	G
1954	19	8	225	Jerry Clem	Philadelphia Eagles	G
1954	20	3	232	Raymond Berry	Baltimore Colts	WR
1955	3	5	30	Ed Bernet	Pittsburgh Steelers	E
1955	3	8	33	Frank Eidom	Philadelphia Eagles	B
1955	11	12	133	Eric Knebel	Cleveland Browns	T
1955	18	4	209	Doyle Nix	Green Bay Packers	B
1955	18	9	214	Duane Nutt	Philadelphia Eagles	B
1956	2	7	20	Forrest Gregg	Green Bay Packers	T
1956	3	2	27	Don McIlhenny	Detroit Lions	B
1956	3	6	31	John Roach	Chicago Cardinals	QB
1956	3	10	35	John Marshall	Los Angeles Rams	B
1956	21	7	248	Hal O'Brien	Green Bay Packers	B
1957	15	9	178	Bill Livingston	Chicago Cardinals	C
1957	24	2	279	Charlie Leyendecker	Green Bay Packers	T
1958	2	5	18	Willard Dewveall	Chicago Bears	WR
1958	13	1	146	Charlie Jackson	Chicago Cardinals	B
1958	16	11	192	Jerry Cornelison	Cleveland Browns	T
1958	26	2	303	Ray Masters	Chicago Cardinals	B
1959	2	12	24	Dave Sherer	Baltimore Colts	E
1959	9	2	98	Gary Ferguson	Chicago Cardinals	T
1959	10	12	120	Don Stewart	Baltimore Colts	E
1959	17	8	200	Dave Wilemon	Los Angeles Rams	T
1959	19	2	218	Billy Dunn	Chicago Cardinals	B
1959	29	11	347	Henry Christopher	New York Giants	E
1960	3	8	32	Don Meredith	Chicago Bears	QB
1960	3	10	34	Jim Welch	Baltimore Colts	DB
1960	13	1	145	James Jones	Los Angeles Rams	E
1961	9	2	114	Glynn Gregory	Dallas Cowboys	B
1961	11	1	141	Jerry Mays	Minnesota Vikings	T
1961	14	7	189	Bob Hunt	Baltimore Colts	T
1962	15	4	200	Guy Reese	Dallas Cowboys	T
1963	11	6	146	Ray Schoenke	Dallas Cowboys	C
1964	20	3	269	John Hughes	Dallas Cowboys	LB
1966	4	14	62	John Roderick	Green Bay Packers	WR
1967	6	21	154	Ron Medlen	Boston Patriots	DE
1967	7	22	181	George Gaiser	Buffalo Bills	T
1967	8	15	200	Jerry Griffin	Chicago Bears	LB
1967	17	19	438	Billy Bob Stewart	New Orleans Saints	LB
1968	2	21	48	Mike Livingston	Kansas City Chiefs	QB
1968	6	2	140	Jim Hagle	Atlanta Falcons	RB
1968	11	18	291	Dennis Partee	San Diego Chargers	K
1969	2	14	40	Jerry LeVias	Houston Oilers	WR
1969	7	15	171	Mike Richardson	Houston Oilers	RB
1969	11	14	274	Terry May	Houston Oilers	C
1971	13	16	328	Chuck Hixson	Kansas City Chiefs	QB
1972	3	14	66	Gary Hammond	New York Jets	WR
1972	12	15	301	Paul Bradley	Detroit Lions	WR
1973	14	21	359	Robert Popelka	Cleveland Browns	DB
1973	17	15	431	Clayton Korver	Kansas City Chiefs	TE
1974	8	19	201	Alvin Maxson	New Orleans Saints	RB
1974	9	23	231	Edward Johnson	Cincinnati Bengals	DE
1974	12	23	309	Keith Bobo	Dallas Cowboys	QB
1975	2	4	30	Louie Kelcher	San Diego Chargers	DT
1975	3	5	57	Oscar Roan	Cleveland Browns	TE
1975	14	2	340	Mike Smith	Baltimore Colts	C
1976	5	6	130	Henry Sheppard	Cleveland Browns	T
1976	5	17	141	Wayne Morris	St. Louis Cardinals	RB
1976	9	13	250	Kenny Harrison	San Francisco 49ers	WR
1976	10	23	288	Freeman Johns	Los Angeles Rams	WR
1978	7	10	176	Arthur Whittington	Oakland Raiders	RB
1979	8	8	200	D. K. Perry	New York Giants	DB
1980	7	18	183	Emanuel Tolbert	Chicago Bears	WR
1980	12	18	323	Robert Fisher	Chicago Bears	TE
1981	3	8	64	John Simmons	Cincinnati Bengals	DB
1981	7	16	182	Lee Spivey	Detroit Lions	T
1981	9	3	224	Byron Hunt	New York Giants	LB
1981	9	7	228	Mike Ford	Tampa Bay Buccaneers	QB
1982	5	5	116	Perry Hartnett	Chicago Bears	T
1982	7	23	190	Harvey Armstrong	Philadelphia Eagles	DT
1982	10	13	264	Eddie Garcia	Green Bay Packers	K
1983	1	2	2	Eric Dickerson	Los Angeles Rams	RB
1983	2	7	35	Wes Hopkins	Philadelphia Eagles	DB
1983	7	7	175	Gary Moten	San Francisco 49ers	LB
1983	7	19	187	Craig James	New England Patriots	RB
1984	1	10	10	Russell Carter	New York Jets	DB
1984	4	12	96	Rickey Bolden	Cleveland Browns	TE
1984	5	9	121	Michael Carter	San Francisco 49ers	DT
1984	7	15	183	Mitch Willis	Los Angeles Raiders	DE
1984u	3	18	74	Doug Hollie	Detroit Lions	DE
1985	2	21	49	Reggie Phillips	Chicago Bears	DB
1985	4	28	112	Dale Hellestrae	Buffalo Bills	T
1985	10	26	278	Ron Anderson	Denver Broncos	LB
1985	11	13	293	Chris Jackson	Kansas City Chiefs	C
1986	1	25	25	Rod Jones	Tampa Bay Buccaneers	DB
1986	1	26	26	Reggie Dupard	New England Patriots	RB
1986	4	11	93	Joe Phillips	Minnesota Vikings	DT
1987	2	26	54	Ron Morris	Chicago Bears	WR
1987	3	7	63	Jerry Ball	Detroit Lions	DT
1987	11	14	293	Terence Mann	Miami Dolphins	DT
1993	4	6	90	Marcello Simmons	Cincinnati Bengals	DB
1998	6	8	161	Chris Bordano	New Orleans Saints	LB
1999	4	22	117	Donald Mitchell	Houston Oilers	DB
1999	6	21	190	Coby Rhinehart	Arizona Cardinals	DB
2003	5	37	172	Kevin Garrett	St. Louis Rams	DB
2007	6	6	180	Justin Rogers	New England Patriots	LB
2009	5	28	164	Thomas Morstead	New Orleans Saints	P
2010	3	18	82	Emmanuel Sanders	Pittsburgh Steelers	WR
2011	6	13	178	Aldrick Robinson	Washington Redskins	WR
2012	3	8	71	Josh LeRibeus	Washington Redskins	G
2012	5	10	145	Taylor Thompson	Tennessee Titans	TE
2012	7	6	213	Richard Crawford	Washington Redskins	DB
2012	7	41	248	Kelvin Beachum	Pittsburgh Steelers	T
2013	2	21	53	Margus Hunt	Cincinnati Bengals	DE
2014	6	4	180	Kenneth Acker	San Francisco 49ers	DB
2014	6	38	214	Garrett Gilbert	St. Louis Rams	QB
2018	2	8	40	Courtland Sutton	Denver Broncos	WR
2018	7	26	244	Justin Lawler	Los Angeles Rams	DE
2018	7	38	256	Trey Quinn	Washington Redskins	WR
2020	6	22	201	James Proche	Baltimore Ravens	WR
2021	3	40	104	Brandon Stephens	Baltimore Ravens	DB
2021	4	22	127	Kylen Granson	Indianapolis Colts	TE
2022	3	41	105	Danny Gray	San Francisco 49ers	WR
2022	6	19	198	Grant Calcaterra	Philadelphia Eagles	TE
2023	2	24	55	Rashee Rice	Kansas City Chiefs	WR
2025	5	19	157	Elijah Roberts	Tampa Bay Buccaneers	DE
2025	7	12	228	Brashard Smith	Kansas City Chiefs	RB
2026	4	33	133	Matthew Hibner	Baltimore Ravens	TE

== Notable undrafted players ==
Note: No drafts held before 1920

Year	Player	Position	Debut Team	Notes
1960	Bobby Loveless	G	Houston Oilers	—
1961	Frank Jackson	WR	Dallas Texans	—
1971	Bill Line	DT	New Orleans Saints	—
1975	Ted Thompson	LB	Houston Oilers	—
1976	Brian Duncan	RB	Cleveland Browns	—
1977	Ricky Wesson	DB	Kansas City Chiefs	—
1979	Putt Choate	LB	Atlanta Falcons	—
1980	Anthony Dickerson	LB	Dallas Cowboys	—
1986	Don King	DB	Kansas City Chiefs	—
1987	Dwayne Anderson	DB	St. Louis Cardinals	—
1987	Cornelius Dozier	DB	Kansas City Chiefs	—
1987	Marquis Pleasant	WR	Cincinnati Bengals	—
1987	Eric Smith	DB	Kansas City Chiefs	—
1993	Cary Brabham	DB	Los Angeles Raiders	—
1996	Vernon Edwards	DE	San Diego Chargers	—
2002	Kevin Aldridge	DE	Tennessee Titans	—
2002	Albert Johnson	WR	Miami Dolphins	—
2004	Keylon Kincade	RB	New York Giants	—
2010	Bryan McCann	CB	Dallas Cowboys	—
2011	Sterling Moore	CB	Oakland Raiders	—
2012	Cole Beasley	WR	Dallas Cowboys	—
2013	Chris Banjo	DB	Jacksonville Jaguars	—
2013	Ja’Gared Davis	LB	New England Patriots	—
2013	Zach Line	FB	Minnesota Vikings	—
2014	Ben Gottschalk	C	Kansas City Chiefs	—
2016	Zach Wood	LS	Dallas Cowboys	—
2018	Evan Brown	C	New York Giants	—
2020	Xavier Jones	RB	Los Angeles Rams	—
2020	Delontae Scott	LB	Green Bay Packers	—
2021	Shane Buechele	QB	Kansas City Chiefs	Super Bowl champion (LVII)
2022	Trevor Denbow	S	Indianapolis Colts	—
2022	Hayden Howerton	OL	Tennessee Titans	—
2023	Junior Aho	NT	Minnesota Vikings	—
2023	Jaylon Thomas	OT	Baltimore Ravens	—
2024	Elijah Chatman	DE	New York Giants	—
2024	DeVere Levelston	DE	Seattle Seahawks	—
2024	Jordan Miller	NT	Denver Broncos	—
2024	Charles Woods	CB	Los Angeles Rams	—
2025	Anthony Booker Jr.	DL	Las Vegas Raiders	—
2025	Moochie Dixon	WR	New Orleans Saints	—
2025	Jared Harrison-Hunte	DT	Carolina Panthers	—
2025	Justin Osborne	OT	Cleveland Browns	—
2026	TJ Harden	RB	Cleveland Browns	—
2026	Jordan Hudson	WR	Dallas Cowboys	—
2026	Jeffrey M'Ba	DT	Washington Commanders	—
2026	R. J. Maryland	TE	Green Bay Packers	—
2026	Isaiah Nwokobia	S	Cincinnati Bengals	—
2026	Cameron Robertson	OLB	Arizona Cardinals	—
2026	Isaiah Smith	OLB	Carolina Panthers	—
2026	Terry Webb	DL	Los Angeles Chargers	—
