= 2017 SMU Mustangs football team =

American college football season

2017 SMU Mustangs football

Frisco Bowl, L 10–51 vs. Louisiana Tech
- Conference: American Athletic Conference
- West Division
- Record: 7–6 (4–4 The American)
- Head coach: Chad Morris (3rd season; regular season); Sonny Dykes (bowl game)
- Offensive coordinator: Joe Craddock (3rd season)
- Offensive scheme: Power spread
- Defensive coordinator: Van Malone (3rd season)
- Base defense: 4–2–5
- Home stadium: Gerald J. Ford Stadium

2017 American Athletic Conference football standings
	Conf.			Overall
Team	W		L	W		L
East Division
No. 6 UCF xy$	8	–	0	13	–	0
No. 21 South Florida	6	–	2	10	–	2
Temple	4	–	4	7	–	6
Cincinnati	2	–	6	4	–	8
UConn	2	–	6	3	–	9
East Carolina	2	–	6	3	–	9
West Division
No. 25 Memphis xy	7	–	1	10	–	3
Houston	5	–	3	7	–	5
Navy	4	–	4	7	–	6
SMU	4	–	4	7	–	6
Tulane	3	–	5	5	–	7
Tulsa	1	–	7	2	–	10
Championship: UCF 62, Memphis 55
$ – Conference champion; x – Division champion/co-champions; y – Championship game participant; As of January 9, 2018; Rankings from AP Poll.

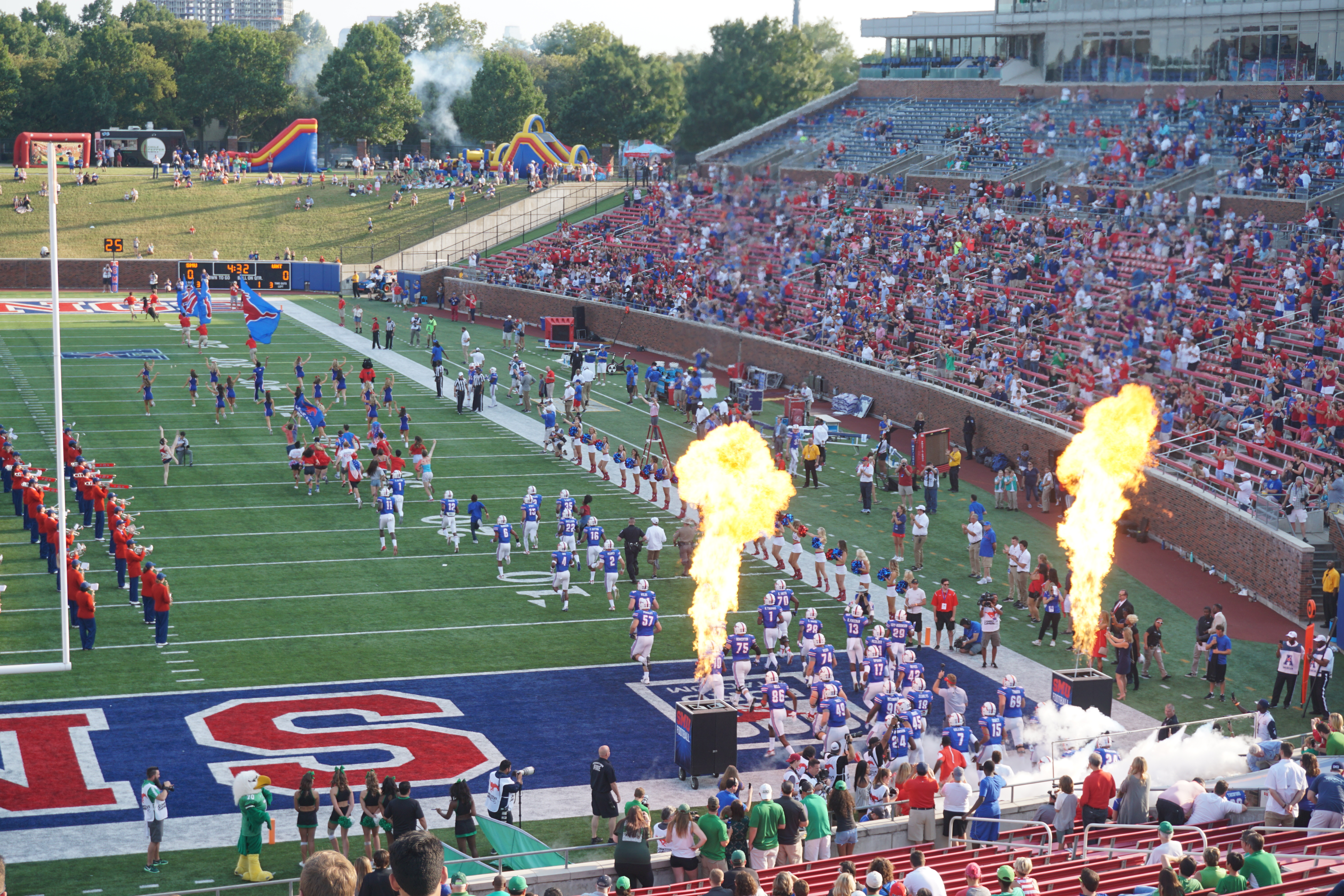
The 2017 SMU football team taking the field before the game against North Texas

The 2017 SMU Mustangs football team represented Southern Methodist University in the 2017 NCAA Division I FBS football season. The Mustangs played their home games at Gerald J. Ford Stadium in Dallas, Texas, and competed in the West Division of the American Athletic Conference. They were led by third-year coach Chad Morris during the entire regular season until December 6, when he resigned to become the head coach at Arkansas. On December 11, SMU hired Sonny Dykes as head coach, and he led them in their bowl game. They finished the season 7–6, 4–4 in AAC play to finish in a tie for third place in the West Division. They were invited to the Frisco Bowl where they lost to Louisiana Tech.

== Schedule ==
SMU announced its 2017 football schedule on February 9, 2017. The schedule consisted of 7 home and 5 away games in the regular season. The Mustangs hosted AAC foes UConn, Tulane, Tulsa, and UCF, and traveled to Cincinnati, Houston, Tulane, and UCF. The Mustangs hosted three of the four non-conference opponents, Arkansas State from the Sun Belt Conference, North Texas from Conference USA and Stephen F. Austin from the Southland Conference, and traveled to TCU of the Big 12 Conference.

Date	Time	Opponent	Site	TV	Result	Attendance
September 2	6:00 p.m.	Stephen F. Austin*	Gerald J. Ford Stadium; Dallas, TX	ESPN3	W 58–14	20,478
September 9	6:00 p.m.	North Texas*	Gerald J. Ford Stadium; Dallas, TX (Safeway Bowl)	ESPN3	W 54–32	24,638
September 16	2:30 p.m.	at No. 20 TCU*	Amon G. Carter Stadium; Fort Worth, TX (rivalry)	ESPNU	L 36–56	44,489
September 23	6:00 p.m.	Arkansas State*	Gerald J. Ford Stadium; Dallas, TX	ESPN3	W 44–21	23,672
September 30	3:00 p.m.	UConn	Gerald J. Ford Stadium; Dallas, TX	ESPNews	W 49–28	17,237
October 7	6:00 p.m.	at Houston	TDECU Stadium; Houston, TX (rivalry)	CBSSN	L 22–35	31,153
October 21	3:00 p.m.	at Cincinnati	Nippert Stadium; Cincinnati, OH	ESPNU	W 31–28 ^{OT}	30,885
October 27	8:00 p.m.	Tulsa	Gerald J. Ford Stadium; Dallas, TX	ESPN2	W 38–34	14,930
November 4	6:15 p.m.	No. 15 UCF^{†}	Gerald J. Ford Stadium; Dallas, TX	ESPN2	L 24–31	24,445
November 11	2:30 p.m.	at Navy	Navy–Marine Corps Memorial Stadium; Annapolis, MD (Gansz Trophy)	CBSSN	L 40–43	36,157
November 18	11:00 a.m.	at No. 18 Memphis	Liberty Bowl Memorial Stadium; Memphis, TN	ESPNews	L 45–66	35,329
November 25	11:00 a.m.	Tulane	Gerald J. Ford Stadium; Dallas, TX	CBSSN	W 41–38	14,209
December 20	7:00 p.m.	vs. Louisiana Tech*	Toyota Stadium; Frisco, TX (Frisco Bowl)	ESPN	L 10–51	14,419
*Non-conference game; ^{†}Homecoming; Rankings from AP Poll released prior to game; All times are in Central time

== Weekly awards ==
- Jordan Wyatt – Bronko Nagurski National Defensive Player of the Week, AAC Defensive Player of the Week
- Trey Quinn – Earl Campbell Tyler Rose Award Player of the Week, AAC Offensive Player of the Week

== Game summaries ==
=== Stephen F. Austin ===
	1	2	3	4	Total
Lumberjacks	0	7	0	7	14
Mustangs	21	17	6	14	58

=== North Texas ===
	1	2	3	4	Total
Mean Green	10	0	7	15	32
Mustangs	10	14	16	14	54

=== At TCU ===
	1	2	3	4	Total
Mustangs	16	6	7	7	36
No. 20 Horned Frogs	7	21	7	21	56

=== Arkansas State ===
	1	2	3	4	Total
Red Wolves	14	0	0	7	21
Mustangs	10	20	7	7	44

=== UConn ===
	1	2	3	4	Total
Huskies	7	3	10	8	28
Mustangs	7	14	7	21	49

=== At Houston ===
	1	2	3	4	Total
Mustangs	9	3	10	0	22
Cougars	7	14	7	7	35

=== At Cincinnati ===
	1	2	3	4	OT	Total
Mustangs	14	7	0	7	3	31
Bearcats	10	10	0	8	0	28

=== Tulsa ===
	1	2	3	4	Total
Golden Hurricane	14	14	6	0	34
Mustangs	7	14	7	10	38

=== UCF ===
	1	2	3	4	Total
No. 15 Knights	7	14	7	3	31
Mustangs	7	7	10	0	24

=== At Navy ===
	1	2	3	4	Total
Mustangs	5	6	21	8	40
Midshipmen	13	21	6	3	43

=== At Memphis ===
	1	2	3	4	Total
Mustangs	10	14	14	7	45
No. 18 Tigers	10	21	14	21	66

=== Tulane ===
	1	2	3	4	Total
Green Wave	7	14	17	0	38
Mustangs	14	13	7	7	41

=== Vs. Louisiana Tech–Frisco Bowl ===
	1	2	3	4	Total
Bulldogs	21	21	6	3	51
Mustangs	3	7	0	0	10

== Players in the 2018 NFL draft ==
Player	Position	Round	Pick	NFL club
Courtland Sutton	WR	2	40	Denver Broncos
Justin Lawler	DE	7	244	Los Angeles Rams
Trey Quinn	WR	7	256	Washington Redskins

== Roster ==
2017 SMU Mustangs football team roster
Players
Coaches
Offense

Pos.	#	Name	Class
QB	1	Wade Smith	Fr
WR	1	Kevin Thomas	Jr
QB	2	Rafe Peavey	Jr
WR	3	James Proche	RSo
WR	4	Tyler Page	Fr
RB	5	Xavier Jones	RSo
RB	6	Braeden West	Jr
QB	7	D.J. Gillins	Jr
QB	8	Ben Hicks	RSo
WR	9	Shelby Walker	Sr
WR	10	Brandon Benson	RFr
TE	11	Raymond Epps	Sr
QB	11	Matthew Maggi	Fr
QB	12	Dylan Beiersdorf	Fr
RB	13	Ke'Mon Freeman	So
TE	14	Ryan Becker	So
WR	15	Alex Honey	RSo
WR	16	Courtland Sutton	Jr
QB	17	Austin Upshaw	Fr
WR	18	Trey Quinn	RJr
RB	21	Kayce Medlock	Fr
WR	22	Myron Gailliard	RSo
TE	24	Mitchell Kaufman	Jr
WR	27	Marcalas Johnson	So
RB	31	Merek Pierce	So
RB	36	Kane Norman	Jr
WR	43	J.R. Griffin	So
OL	56	Harrison Barton	RFr
OL	57	Chad Pursley	Jr
OL	60	Will Hopkins	Sr
OL	63	Evan Brown	Sr
OL	64	Bryce Wilds	RSo
OL	65	Matthew Huhn	Fr
OL	68	Nick Natour	Jr
OL	69	Jacob Todora	RFr
OL	70	Kadarius Smith	RFr
OL	74	Braxton Webb	RFr
OL	75	Hayden Howerton	Fr
OL	77	Alan Ali	Fr
OL	78	Jalen Lynch	RFr
OL	79	Rex Printz	Sr
TE	81	Jordan Severt	Jr
TE	82	Corey Rau	RFr
WR	83	Matt Dorrity	Fr
TE	85	Thomas Mallak	Fr
WR	86	Judah Bell	Fr
WR	88	Joshua Shelmire	RFr
TE	88	Hunter Thedford	So
TE	90	Jackson Lawley	Fr

Defense

Pos.	#	Name	Class
CB	1	Eric Sutton	So
LB	2	Noah Spears	RFr
DB	3	Cedric Lancaster	Sr
S	4	Mikial Onu	So
CB	5	Ar’mani Johnson	Fr
S	6	Elijah McQueen	Fr
DL	7	Michael Badejo	So
DB	8	Rodney Clemons	RSo
DL	10	Demerick Gary	So
LB	11	Kyran Mitchell	Jr
DB	12	Kevin Johnson	RSo
DL	13	Tyeson Neals	So
DB	15	Jordan Wyatt	Jr
LB	17	Jordon Williams	RSo
DB	18	William Jeanlys	Jr
DB	20	Collin Rock	RFr
S	21	Michael Salerno	Fr
LB	22	Matt McNew	Jr
DE	23	Nick Horton	Sr
S	24	Delano Robinson	Fr
LB	25	Myles Duke	RFr
DB	26	Brent Freeman	Jr
S	27	Michael Clark	RFr
DB	28	Christian Davis	So
CB	29	Justin Guy-Robinson	Fr
LB	30	Kyle Blaskovich	Fr
LB	30	Shaine Hailey	Fr
LB	31	Richard Moore	Jr
LB	32	RC Cox	Sr
LB	33	Jordan Ward	So
DB	34	Brice Madison	RFr
DL	35	Delontae Scott	RSo
DL	38	Toby Ndukwe	Fr
LB	39	Rob Grass	Fr
DL	40	Dimarya Mixon	Sr
DB	41	Pedro Duran Silva	Fr
LB	42	Raul Reyes III	Jr
DL	44	Harrison Loveless	Fr
LB	46	Andrew Adams	So
LB	48	Anthony Rhone	Sr
DE	49	Robert Hall	RFr
DT	51	Pono Davis	So
DL	56	Jordan Gipson	Fr
DT	72	Patrick Jones	RFr
DL	90	Ken McLaurin	RFr
DE	93	Mason Gentry	Sr
DL	94	Chris Biggurs	RSo
DT	95	J.T. Williams	Sr
DL	97	Turner Coxe	Fr
DE	99	Justin Lawler	Sr

Special teams

Pos.	#	Name	Class
K	5	Josh Williams	Jr
P	33	Alex Melvin	RSo
K	45	Will Moore	RFr
P	47	Jamie Sackville	So
LS	53	Nicholas Avantino	Jr
LS	54	Garrett Stotts	Jr
LS	57	Michael Sehlinger	So
K	89	Kevin Robledo	So
P	98	Case Bayless	Fr

Head coach

- Chad Morris

Coordinators/assistant coaches

- Van Malone – Defensive Coordinator
- Joe Craddock – Offensive Coordinator
- Justin Stepp – Assistant Coach/WR
- Dustin Fry – Assistant Coach/OL
- Jeff Traylor – Associate Head Coach/Running Backs
- Keith Gunn – Assistant Coach/Special Teams and TE
- Archie McDaniel – Assistant Coach/LB
- Jess Loepp – Assistant Coach/DB
- Buddy Wyatt – Assistant Coach/DL
- Randy Ross – Sr. Associate Director of Football Operations
- Steve Stigall – Associate Director of Football Ops/Player Development
- Daric Riley – Special Teams Analyst
- Mark Smith – Director of Football Recruiting/Defensive Analyst
- Ramon Flanigan – Director of External Affairs
- SJ Tuohy – Special Teams Assistant/Football Assistant
- Brooke Stepp – Director of Recruiting Operations
- Jared Hunt – Recruiting Operations Coordinator
- Benton Pruet – Recruiting Assistant
- Isaiah deLaura – Football Operations Assistant
- Terry Gardner – Executive Assistant to Head Coach
- Emma Brown – Administrative Assistant
- Cody Vincent – Director of Graphic Design
- Sam Ogden – Director of Football Video Services
- Brooks Cockrell – Director of Creative Media
- Sam Nunamacher – Graduate Assistant/Video
- Will Bryant – Graduate Assistant/Offense
- GJ Kinne – Graduate Assistant/Offense
- Wes Johnson – Graduate Assistant/Defense
- Chris Scott – Graduate Assistant/Defense
- Trumain Carroll – Director of Strength & Conditioning
- Rhett Brooks – Strength Coach
- Marc Soltis – Strength Coach
- Jacob Leavitt – Strength Coach
- Brittney Bearden – Sports Dietitian
- Mike Morton – Asst. A.D. - Student Health & Well-Being
- Albert Veytia – Director of Equipment Operations
- Toyohiro Kaieda – Assistant Equipment Manager
- Ryan Ewalt – Assistant Equipment Manager

Legend

- (C) Team captain
- (S) Suspended
- (I) Ineligible
- Injured
- Redshirt

Roster
