= 2017 Frisco Bowl =

2017 DXL Frisco Bowl
- 1st Frisco Bowl
Louisiana Tech Bulldogs	SMU Mustangs
(6–6)	(7–5)
C-USA	The American
51	10
Head coach: Skip Holtz	Head coach: Sonny Dykes
	1	2	3	4	Total
Louisiana Tech	21	21	6	3	51
SMU	3	7	0	0	10
- Date: December 20, 2017
- Season: 2017
- Stadium: Toyota Stadium
- Location: Frisco, Texas
- MVP: J'Mar Smith (QB, La. Tech) & Amik Robertson (CB, La. Tech)
- Referee: Ted Pitts (Sun Belt)
- Attendance: 14,419
- Payout: US$100,000

United States TV coverage
- Network: ESPN
- Announcers: Mike Couzens, John Congemi, Kris Budden

The 2017 Frisco Bowl was a college football bowl game that was played on December 20, 2017, at Toyota Stadium in Frisco, Texas, United States. The first annual Frisco Bowl, it featured the Louisiana Tech Bulldogs of Conference USA and the SMU Mustangs of the American Athletic Conference. It began at 7:00 p.m. CST and aired on ESPN. It was one of the 2017–18 bowl games that concluded the 2017 FBS football season. Sponsored by DXL, a retailer of men's big and tall apparel, the game was officially known as the DXL Frisco Bowl. The Bulldogs decisively beat the Mustangs by a score of 51–10.

== Teams ==
The game featured the SMU Mustangs against the Louisiana Tech Bulldogs. It was the fifth all-time meeting between the schools, with Louisiana Tech having led the series 3–1. The Mustangs and Bulldogs played together in the Western Athletic Conference from 2001 until 2004, when SMU joined Conference USA. Coincidentally, Conference USA is the conference that Louisiana Tech would join in the same season that SMU joined The American.

=== SMU Mustangs ===
This was the sixteenth bowl game in school history for SMU, and the Mustangs' seventh to be played in the Dallas–Fort Worth metroplex.

=== Louisiana Tech Bulldogs ===
This was the tenth bowl game in school history for Louisiana Tech, and their fourth consecutive (all wins). It was the Bulldogs' third bowl game to be played in the Dallas–Fort Worth metroplex.

== Game summary ==
=== Scoring summary ===
Scoring summary

Quarter	Time	Drive			Team	Scoring information	Score	
Quarter	Time	Plays	Yards	TOP	Team	Scoring information	La. Tech	SMU
1	7:43	9	30	3:24	La. Tech	J'Mar Smith 1-yard touchdown run, Jonathan Barnes kick good	7	0
1	6:50	3	2	0:52	La. Tech	Interception returned 45 yards for touchdown by Amik Robertson, Jonathan Barnes kick good	14	0
1	3:04	9	47	3:46	SMU	25-yard field goal by Josh Williams	14	3
1	0:45	4	26	2:19	La. Tech	Teddy Veal 6-yard touchdown reception from J'Mar Smith, Jonathan Barnes kick good	21	3
2	11:31	3	7	1:03	La. Tech	Interception returned 23 yards for touchdown by Darryl Lewis, Jonathan Barnes kick good	28	3
2	5:12	5	82	2:26	La. Tech	Teddy Veal 27-yard touchdown reception from J'Mar Smith, Jonathan Barnes kick good	35	3
2	1:33	6	30	3:05	La. Tech	Kam McKnight 11-yard touchdown reception from J'Mar Smith, Jonathan Barnes kick good	42	3
2	0:15	9	78	1:18	SMU	Trey Quinn 9-yard touchdown reception from Ben Hicks, Josh Williams kick good	42	10
3	10:33	9	65	4:27	La. Tech	28-yard field goal by Jonathan Barnes	45	10
3	3:53	11	41	5:01	La. Tech	43-yard field goal by Jonathan Barnes	48	10
4	8:47	5	37	1:53	La. Tech	41-yard field goal by Jonathan Barnes	51	10
"TOP" = time of possession. For other American football terms, see Glossary of American football.							51	10

=== Statistics ===
	1	2	3	4	Total
Bulldogs	21	21	6	3	51
Mustangs	3	7	0	0	10

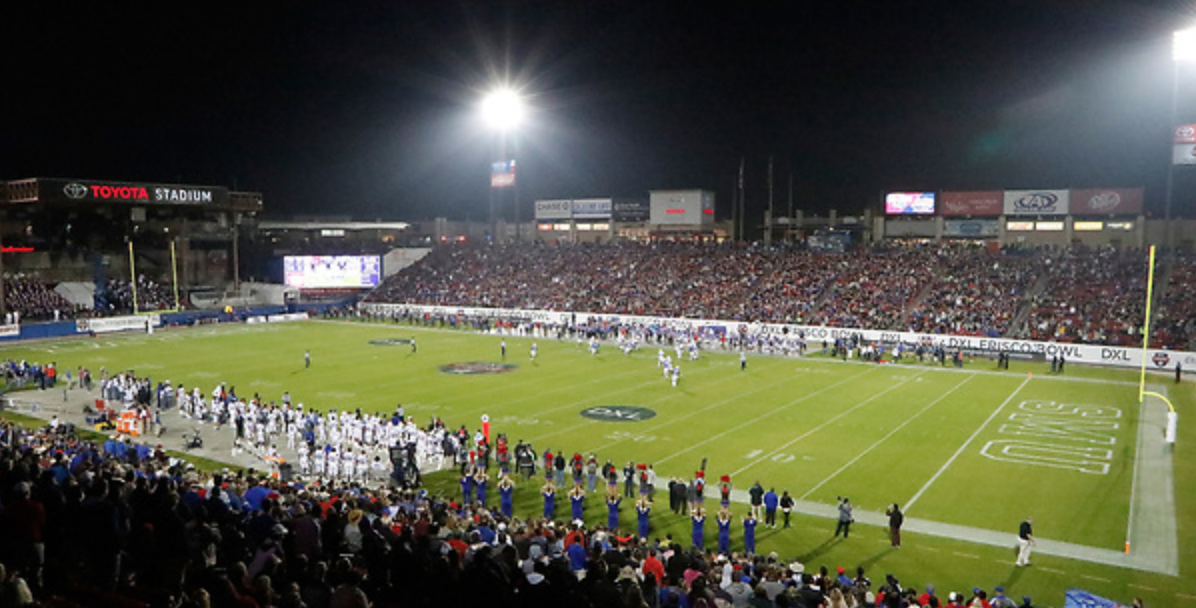
Toyota Stadium during the 2017 Frisco Bowl

Statistics	La. Tech	SMU
First downs	18	20
Total offense, yards	357	294
Rushes-yards (net)	38–141	41–167
Passing yards (net)	216	127
Passes, Comp-Att-Int	16–27–0	19–34–3
Time of Possession	30:21	29:39

Team	Category	Player	Statistics
Louisiana Tech	Passing	J'Mar Smith	15/23, 216 yds, 3 TD
Louisiana Tech	Rushing	Boston Scott	20 car, 110 yds
Louisiana Tech	Receiving	Teddy Veal	5 rec, 118 yds, 2 TD
SMU	Passing	Ben Hicks	19/34, 127 yds, 1 TD, 3 INT
SMU	Rushing	Xavier Jones	12 car, 56 yds
SMU	Receiving	Courtland Sutton	6 rec, 68 yds
