= Shane Buechele =

American football player (born 1998)

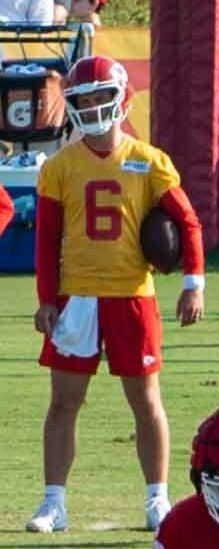
- Buechele with the Kansas City Chiefs in 2022

No. 6 – Buffalo Bills
- Position: Quarterback
- Roster status: Practice squad

Personal information
- Born: January 8, 1998 (age 28); Arlington, Texas, U.S.
- Listed height: 6 ft 0 in (1.83 m)
- Listed weight: 210 lb (95 kg)

Career information
- High school: Lamar (Arlington)
- College: Texas (2016–2018); SMU (2019–2020)
- NFL draft: 2021: undrafted

Career history
- Kansas City Chiefs (2021–2022); Buffalo Bills (2023–2025); Kansas City Chiefs (2025); Buffalo Bills (2025–present)

Awards and highlights
- Super Bowl champion (LVII); First-team All-AAC (2019)

Career NFL statistics as of 2025
- Passing attempts: 14
- Passing completions: 7
- Completion percentage: 50%
- TD–INT: 0–0
- Passing yards: 88
- Passer rating: 69.9
- Rushing yards: 4
- Stats at Pro Football Reference

Shane Buechele (born January 8, 1998) is an American professional football quarterback for the Buffalo Bills of the National Football League (NFL). He played college football for the Texas Longhorns and SMU Mustangs, then signing with the Kansas City Chiefs as an undrafted free agent in 2021.

== Early life ==
Buechele attended Lamar High School in Arlington, Texas, where he was a star in both football and baseball. During his career as a quarterback, he passed for 6,379 yards with 73 touchdowns and rushed for 1,805 yards and 21 touchdowns. Buechele was ranked among the top quarterback recruits in his class and was invited to the Elite 11 quarterback competition where he impressed the coaches with his accuracy, eventually finishing second overall. Despite growing up in a pro-Oklahoma Sooner household, Buechele committed to rival Texas to play college football.

College recruiting
Name	Hometown	School	Height	Weight	Commit date
Shane Buechele; QB	Arlington, Texas	Lamar High School	6 ft 1 in (1.85 m)	200 lb (91 kg)	Dec 12, 2015
Shane Buechele; QB	Recruit ratings: Scout: Rivals: 247Sports: (81)				
Overall recruit ranking:
Note: In many cases, Scout, Rivals, 247Sports, On3, and ESPN may conflict in their listings of height and weight.; In these cases, the average was taken. ESPN grades are on a 100-point scale.; Sources: "2016 Texas Football Commitment List". Rivals.; "2016 Team Ranking". Rivals.com.

== College career ==
=== Texas Longhorns ===
Buechele competed with Tyrone Swoopes for the Longhorns' starting quarterback job his freshman year in 2016. After winning the job, he started his first career game against 10th-ranked Notre Dame, making him only the second true freshman to ever start at QB for Texas and the first since Bobby Layne in 1944. Buechele led the unranked Longhorns to a 50–47 double overtime victory in what was the first-ever overtime game in Darrell K Royal–Texas Memorial Stadium. The game was widely regarded as an instant classic. Buechele finished with 280 yards on 16 for 26 passing for 2 touchdowns and one interception. In a week 10 battle against West Virginia, Buechele passed Colt McCoy for most passing yards by a freshman in school history. Buechele finished his freshman season with 2,958 passing yards, 21 passing touchdowns, and 11 interceptions.

Buechele started in Texas' first game of the 2017 season, a 51–41 loss to Maryland. In that game he set career highs for completions, attempts and yards. However, due to various injuries, he was replaced by backup quarterback Sam Ehlinger in subsequent games against San Jose State and USC. Buechele returned to lead Texas over Iowa State, but then injuries again sidelined him in losses in the next two games, against Kansas State and Oklahoma, though he did take the field briefly in the latter. He returned to start against Baylor, TCU and Kansas, losing only the TCU game. He then started the West Virginia game, but only played the first two series before being benched for Ehlinger. Buechele finished the season as Ehlinger's backup in games against Texas Tech and Missouri.

In 2018, Buechele saw action in only two games, therefore redshirting that season. Against Baylor, he replaced an injured Ehlinger after game officials made Ehlinger leave because his right (throwing) hand was bleeding. Ehlinger had an injured shoulder and never returned. Buechele led the Longhorns to a 23–17 victory. Against Iowa State, Ehlinger again injured his shoulder, this time in the second half. Buechele again replaced him in another Longhorn win. This time he merely needed to hold on to the lead, throwing 10 for 10 for 89 yards and a touchdown.

=== SMU Mustangs ===
Buechele transferred to Southern Methodist University after graduating from Texas in the spring, replacing Ben Hicks who transferred to the University of Arkansas. Buechele started for the Mustangs in their first game of the season at Arkansas State. He finished the game with 30 completions out of 49 attempts for 360 yards with one interception in the 37–30 victory.

=== Statistics ===
Season	Team	Games			Passing								Rushing			
Season	Team	GP	GS	Record	Cmp	Att	Pct	Yds	Y/A	TD	Int	Rtg	Att	Yds	Avg	TD
2016	Texas	12	12	5–7	236	391	60.4	2,958	7.6	21	11	136.0	97	151	1.6	2
2017	Texas	9	7	5–2	137	213	64.3	1,405	6.6	7	4	126.8	62	99	1.6	2
2018	Texas	2	0	—	30	44	68.2	273	6.2	2	1	130.8	10	8	0.8	0
2019	SMU	13	13	10–3	307	490	62.7	3,929	8.0	34	10	148.8	64	105	1.6	2
2020	SMU	10	10	7–3	242	370	65.4	3,095	8.4	23	6	152.9	58	105	1.8	2
Career		46	42	27–15	952	1,508	63.1	11,660	7.7	87	32	142.9	291	468	1.6	8

== Professional career ==
Pre-draft measurables
Height	Weight	Arm length	Hand span	Wingspan	40-yard dash	10-yard split	20-yard split	20-yard shuttle	Three-cone drill	Vertical jump	Broad jump
6 ft 0 1/4 in (1.84 m)	210 lb (95 kg)	30 1/4 in (0.77 m)	9 3/8 in (0.24 m)	6 ft 0 1/2 in (1.84 m)	4.95 s	1.74 s	2.86 s	4.60 s	7.34 s	30.0 in (0.76 m)	9 ft 6 in (2.90 m)
All values from Pro Day

=== Kansas City Chiefs (first stint) ===
After going undrafted in the 2021 NFL draft, Buechele signed with the Kansas City Chiefs as an undrafted free agent on May 13, 2021. He was waived on August 31, 2021 and the following day he was signed to their practice squad. He was elevated from the practice squad on November 16, 2021 but spent the rest of the season on the inactive list.

In the 2022 NFL season, Buechele remained on the roster backing up Patrick Mahomes, but was inactive for the entire season. As a part of the Chiefs, he got a Super Bowl ring after their Super Bowl LVII victory over the Philadelphia Eagles.

On August 29, 2023, Buechele was waived by the Chiefs.

=== Buffalo Bills (first stint) ===
On August 31, 2023, Buechele was signed to the Buffalo Bills practice squad. He signed a reserve/future contract on January 23, 2024. Buechele was placed on injured reserve with a neck injury on August 13, and missed the entirety of the 2024 season.

On January 29, 2025, Buechele re-signed with the Bills on a one-year contract. He was released on August 26 as part of final roster cuts and re-signed to the practice squad the next day.

=== Kansas City Chiefs (second stint) ===
On December 22, 2025, Buechele was signed to the Kansas City Chiefs' active roster as a result of injuries to Chiefs quarterbacks Patrick Mahomes and Gardner Minshew, backing up new starter Chris Oladokun. On January 4, 2026, Buechele made his NFL debut against the Las Vegas Raiders, completing 7 out of his 14 pass attempts for 88 yards. He was released the next day.

=== Buffalo Bills (second stint) ===
On January 7, 2026, Buechele re-signed with the Buffalo Bills' practice squad. On February 11, Buechele signed a reserve/futures contract with the Bills.

On August 30, 2026, Buechele was waived by the Bills as a part of final roster cuts; he was re-signed to Buffalo's practice squad the next day.

== Personal life ==
Buechele's father, Steve, played in Major League Baseball (MLB) from 1985 to 1995 and is a TV analyst for the Texas Rangers. He has four older siblings: Garrett, Tanner, Jordan, and Amber. His brother, Garrett, played baseball at Oklahoma and played in the minor leagues.

On March 12, 2023, Buechele married his long-time girlfriend Paige Loren in Grapevine, Texas.
