= Chuck Hixson =

American football player (born 1947)

Profile
- Position: Quarterback

Personal information
- Born: 1947 (age 78–79); San Antonio, Texas, U.S.
- Listed height: 6 ft 2 in (1.88 m)
- Listed weight: 192 lb (87 kg)

Career information
- High school: Highlands (San Antonio, Texas)
- College: Southern Methodist
- NFL draft: 1971: 13th round, 328th overall pick

Career history
- Kansas City Chiefs (1971)*
- * Offseason or practice squad member only

Awards and highlights
- Sammy Baugh Trophy (1968); First-team All-SWC (1969)

Charles Oliver Hixson Jr. (born 1947) is an American former football quarterback who played at Southern Methodist University in Dallas, Texas. After leading the nation in passing as a sophomore, he was awarded the Sammy Baugh Trophy in 1968. The 6 ft 2 in (1.88 m) 192 pounds (87 kg) quarterback had 265 completions in 468 attempts for 3,103 yards, 23 interceptions, 21 touchdowns, and 2,995 yards of total offense that year.

In his three seasons at SMU (1968–1970), Hixson established several school career records that stood for many years:

- Passes completed: 642 (surpassed by Ben Hicks in 2018)
- Passes attempted: 1,115 (surpassed by Ben Hicks in 2018)
- Passing yards: 7,179 (surpassed by Ben Hicks in 2018)
- Passing touchdowns: 40 (surpassed by Justin Willis in 2007 and others subsequently)
- Passes had intercepted: 56 (current)

Hixson was a 13th round selection (328th overall pick) in the 1971 NFL draft by the Kansas City Chiefs.
