= Redman Hume =

Profile
- Position: Halfback

Personal information
- Born: January 30, 1906; Kingston, Oklahoma, U.S.
- Died: November 26, 1968 (aged 62); Texas, U.S.

Career information
- College: Southern Methodist University

Career history
- 1926–1928: SMU Mustangs

Awards and highlights
- Third-team All-American (1928); 2× First-team All-SWC (1927, 1928)

Theodore Redman Hume (January 30, 1906 – November 26, 1968) was an American football and baseball player and football coach.

Hume was born in Kingston, Oklahoma, in 1906. He enrolled at Southern Methodist University and played at the halfback position for the SMU Mustangs football team. He led SMU to a victory over the Texas Longhorns on November 4, 1928, but he suffered a leg injury in the game and had to be carried from the field. He scored 86 points during the 1928 season, and he was selected by the United Press as a third-team player on the 1928 College Football All-America Team.

Hume also played baseball, and in February 1929, he was signed by Connie Mack of the Philadelphia Athletics to try out for an outfield position with the team. He was described at the time as "extremely fast, a good fielder and has done creditably at bat." He attended the Athletics' training camp in Fort Myers, Florida. He did not make it to the big league roster, but he did play in the minor leagues from 1929 to 1931. During the 1929 season, he appeared in 112 games for the minor league club in Martinsburg, West Virginia, and compiled a .285 batting average with 37 extra base hits.

After his playing career ended, Hume coached football at Highland Park High School in University Park, Texas and later joined the coaching staff at SMU. He died in 1968 at age 62.
