= Darius Johnson (American football) =

American football player (born 1991)

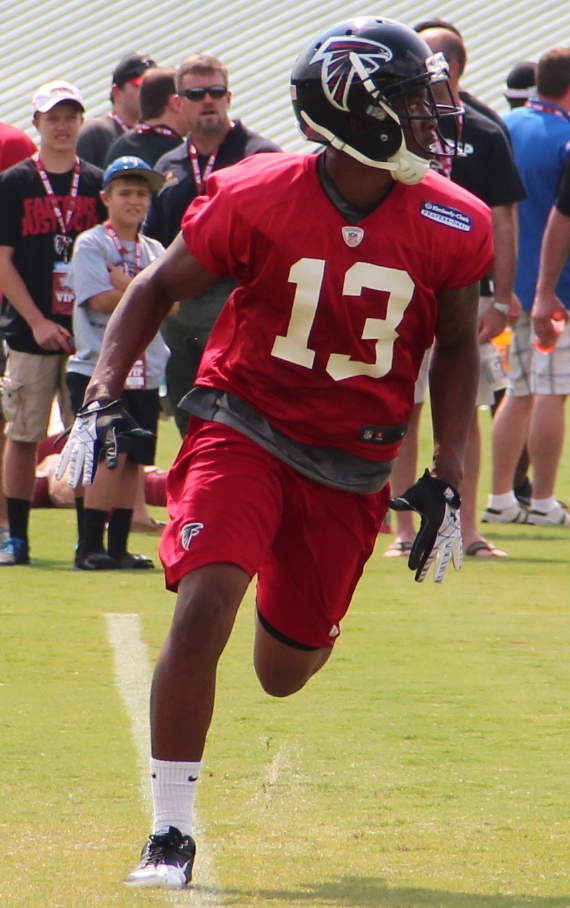
- Johnson with the Atlanta Falcons in 2013

No. 13
- Position: Wide receiver

Personal information
- Born: February 22, 1991 (age 35); Missouri City, Texas, U.S.
- Listed height: 5 ft 10 in (1.78 m)
- Listed weight: 175 lb (79 kg)

Career information
- High school: Hightower (Missouri City)
- College: SMU (2009–2012)
- NFL draft: 2013: undrafted

Career history
- Atlanta Falcons (2013); Detroit Lions (2016)*
- * Offseason or practice squad member only

Awards and highlights
- First-team All-C-USA (2011); Second-team All-C-USA (2012)

Career NFL statistics
- Receptions: 22
- Receiving yards: 210
- Receiving touchdowns: 1
- Stats at Pro Football Reference

Darius Dashome Johnson (born February 22, 1991) is an American former professional football player who was a wide receiver for the Atlanta Falcons of the National Football League (NFL). He played college football for the SMU Mustangs. He was signed by the Falcons as an undrafted free agent in 2013.

== Early life ==
Johnson played high school football at Hightower High School in Missouri City, Texas. He caught 29 passes for 421 yards and seven touchdowns his junior year in 2007, earning first-team all-district honors. He was rated the No. 68 wide receiver in the country, and a three-star prospect, by Rivals.com. Johnson was rated a two-star prospect by Scout.com. He also participated in track and field in high school.

== College career ==
Johnson played college football for the Mustangs at Southern Methodist University from 2009 to 2012. He played in four games his freshman year in 2009, catching 10 passes for 107 yards and one touchdown, garnering Conference USA All-Freshman recognition. He appeared in 13 games, starting 10, in 2010, recording 78 receptions for 845 yards and six touchdowns. Johnson was SMU's MVP in the 2010 Armed Forces Bowl, recording nine receptions for 152 yards and one touchdown. He totaled 79 receptions for 1,188 yards and eight touchdowns his junior season in 2011, earning first-team All-Conference USA honors. He was named the MVP of the 2012 BBVA Compass Bowl after he caught seven passes for 120 yards and one touchdown. Johnson caught 64 passes for 787 yards and five touchdowns as a senior in 2012, earning second-team All-Conference USA honors.

== Professional career ==
Johnson was signed by the Atlanta Falcons as an undrafted free agent on April 29, 2013. He was waived on August 31, 2013 and signed to the Falcon's practice squad on September 2, 2013. He was promoted to the active roster on October 19, 2013. He played in 10 games, starting two, for the Falcons during the 2013 NFL season, catching 22 passes for 210 yards and one touchdown. In May 2014, Johnson was arrested for DUI, and was subsequently released by the Falcons on July 25, 2014.

Johnson signed with the Detroit Lions on May 9, 2016. He was waived on May 24, 2016.
