= Jeff Atkins (American football) =

American football player (born 1964)

Jeff Atkins (born April 7, 1964) is a former American football running back.

== Biography ==
Atkins grew up in the Butler housing project in Fort Worth, Texas. He attended Fort Worth's Eastern Hills High School. As a senior, he rushed for 2,333 yards and scored 25 touchdowns. He was the No. 1 recruit from Texas. He rushed for 310 and 329 yards in individual games and was later described as "the most celebrated player in the history of Fort Worth high school football."

He played college football as a tailback for the SMU Mustangs from 1983 to 1986, tallying 3,260 rushing yards and scoring 31 touchdowns. He set an SMU freshman record with 218 rushing yards against Rice. He also broke Earl Campbell's Southwest Conference freshman rushing record.

He was not selected in the NFL draft and tried out, unsuccessfully, with the Winnipeg Blue Bombers in 1987. He attempted a comeback and played in several games for the Dallas Texans of the Arena Football League during the 1991 season.
