= 2013 SMU Mustangs football team =

American college football season

2013 SMU Mustangs football
- Conference: American Athletic Conference
- Record: 5–7 (4–4 The American)
- Head coach: June Jones (6th season)
- Co-offensive coordinators: Hal Mumme (1st season); Jason Phillips (2nd season)
- Offensive scheme: Run and shoot/Air raid
- Defensive coordinator: Tom Mason (6th season)
- Base defense: 3–4
- Home stadium: Gerald J. Ford Stadium

2013 American Athletic Conference football standings
	Conf.			Overall
Team	W		L	W		L
No. 10 UCF $	8	–	0	12	–	1
No. 15 Louisville	7	–	1	12	–	1
Cincinnati	6	–	2	9	–	4
Houston	5	–	3	8	–	5
SMU	4	–	4	5	–	7
Rutgers	3	–	5	6	–	7
UConn	3	–	5	3	–	9
South Florida	2	–	6	2	–	10
Memphis	1	–	7	3	–	9
Temple	1	–	7	2	–	10
$ – BCS representative as conference champion; Rankings from AP Poll

The 2013 SMU Mustangs football team represented Southern Methodist University in the 2013 NCAA Division I FBS football season. The Mustangs, led by sixth-year head coach June Jones, played their home games at Gerald J. Ford Stadium in University Park, Texas, an enclave of Dallas. This was the first year as a member of the American Athletic Conference after having previously played in Conference USA. They finished the season 5–7, 4–4 in American Athletic play to finish in fifth place.

== Schedule ==
Date	Time	Opponent	Site	TV	Result	Attendance
August 30	7:00 p.m.	Texas Tech*	Gerald J. Ford Stadium; University Park, TX	ESPN	L 23–41	34,790
September 7	7:00 p.m.	No. 3 (FCS) Montana State*	Gerald J. Ford Stadium; University Park, TX	ESPN3	W 31–30	10,107
September 21	6:00 p.m.	at No. 10 Texas A&M*	Kyle Field; College Station, TX	ESPNU	L 13–42	86,542
September 28	11:00 a.m.	at TCU*	Amon G. Carter Stadium; Fort Worth, TX (Battle for the Iron Skillet)	FS1	L 17–48	45,111
October 5	11:00 a.m.	Rutgers	Gerald J. Ford Stadium; University Park, TX	ESPNews	L 52–55 ^{3OT}	19,436
October 19	11:00 a.m.	at Memphis	Liberty Bowl Memorial Stadium; Memphis, TN	AAN	W 34–29	16,241
October 26	2:00 p.m.	Temple	Gerald J. Ford Stadium; University Park, TX	ESPN3	W 59–49	15,786
November 9	11:00 a.m.	at Cincinnati	Nippert Stadium; Cincinnati, OH	AAN	L 25–28	28,069
November 16	2:00 p.m.	UConn	Gerald J. Ford Stadium; University Park, TX	ESPN3	W 38–21	14,639
November 23	6:00 p.m.	at South Florida	Raymond James Stadium; Tampa, FL	ESPN3	W 16–6	28,397
November 29	11:00 a.m.	at Houston	Reliant Stadium; Houston, TX (rivalry)	ESPN2	L 0–34	23,210
December 7	11:00 a.m.	No. 15 UCF	Gerald J. Ford Stadium; University Park, TX	ESPN	L 13–17	12,589
*Non-conference game; Rankings from AP Poll released prior to game; All times are in Central time

== Game summaries ==
=== Texas Tech ===
	1	2	3	4	Total
Red Raiders	3	10	7	21	41
Mustangs	3	6	7	7	23

Statistics	TTU	SMU
First downs	31	31
Total yards	461	490
Rushing yards	48	102
Passing yards	413	388
Turnovers	0	0
Time of possession	28:37	31:23

Team	Category	Player	Statistics
Texas Tech	Passing	Baker Mayfield	43/60, 413 yards, 4 TD
Texas Tech	Rushing	Baker Mayfield	12 rushes, 16 yards, TD
Texas Tech	Receiving	Eric Ward	13 receptions, 150 yards
SMU	Passing	Garrett Gilbert	41/62, 388 yards
SMU	Rushing	Garrett Gilbert	14 rushes, 53 yards, TD
SMU	Receiving	Jeremy Johnson	12 receptions, 131 yards

=== No. 3 (FCS) Montana State ===
	1	2	3	4	Total
No. 3 (FCS) Bobcats	8	14	8	0	30
Mustangs	5	14	3	9	31

Statistics	MTST	SMU
First downs	25	22
Total yards	378	461
Rushing yards	160	144
Passing yards	218	317
Turnovers	0	2
Time of possession	33:29	26:31

Team	Category	Player	Statistics
Montana State	Passing	DeNarius McGhee	17/27, 218 yards, TD
Montana State	Rushing	Cody Kirk	29 rushes, 107 yards, 2 TD
Montana State	Receiving	Tanner Bleskin	5 receptions, 73 yards
SMU	Passing	Garrett Gilbert	35/48, 317 yards, TD
SMU	Rushing	K. C. Nlemchi	8 rushes, 54 yards, TD
SMU	Receiving	Darius Joseph	12 receptions, 113 yards, TD

=== At No. 10 Texas A&M ===
	1	2	3	4	Total
Mustangs	3	3	0	7	13
No. 10 Aggies	14	18	10	0	42

Statistics	SMU	TAMU
First downs	25	27
Total yards	434	581
Rushing yards	93	265
Passing yards	341	316
Turnovers	3	1
Time of possession	29:04	30:56

Team	Category	Player	Statistics
SMU	Passing	Garrett Gilbert	37/62, 310 yards, TD, INT
SMU	Rushing	Prescott Line	9 rushes, 40 yards
SMU	Receiving	Keenan Holman	10 receptions, 133 yards, TD
Texas A&M	Passing	Johnny Manziel	14/21, 244 yards, TD, INT
Texas A&M	Rushing	Johnny Manziel	12 rushes, 102 yards, 2 TD
Texas A&M	Receiving	Malcome Kennedy	6 receptions, 83 yards, TD

=== At TCU ===
	1	2	3	4	Total
Mustangs	7	3	0	7	17
Horned Frogs	0	7	10	31	48

Statistics	SMU	TCU
First downs	15	16
Total yards	292	335
Rushing yards	16	107
Passing yards	276	228
Turnovers	5	2
Time of possession	17:01	42:59

Team	Category	Player	Statistics
SMU	Passing	Garrett Gilbert	23/44, 276 yards, 2 TD, 4 INT
SMU	Rushing	K. C. Nlemchi	10 rushes, 46 yards
SMU	Receiving	Jeremy Johnson	11 receptions, 159 yards, TD
TCU	Passing	Trevone Boykin	15/26, 228 yards, 2 TD
TCU	Rushing	Waymon James	11 rushes, 54 yards, TD
TCU	Receiving	Ty Slanina	3 receptions, 63 yards, TD

=== Rutgers ===
	1	2	3	4	OT	2OT	3OT	Total
Scarlet Knights	14	7	14	0	7	7	6	55
Mustangs	0	7	7	21	7	7	3	52

Statistics	RUTG	SMU
First downs	22	23
Total yards	474	558
Rushing yards	191	74
Passing yards	283	484
Turnovers	2	1
Time of possession	31:56	28:04

Team	Category	Player	Statistics
Rutgers	Passing	Gary Nova	19/33, 283 yards, 4 TD, INT
Rutgers	Rushing	Justin Goodwin	24 rushes, 149 yards, 2 TD
Rutgers	Receiving	Justin Goodwin	2 receptions, 73 yards, TD
SMU	Passing	Garrett Gilbert	45/70, 484 yards, 5 TD
SMU	Rushing	Traylon Shead	15 rushes, 69 yards
SMU	Receiving	Jeremy Johnson	18 receptions, 217 yards, 3 TD

=== At Memphis ===
	1	2	3	4	Total
Mustangs	7	24	3	0	34
Tigers	3	0	7	19	29

Statistics	SMU	MEM
First downs		
Total yards		
Rushing yards		
Passing yards		
Turnovers		
Time of possession		

Team	Category	Player	Statistics
SMU	Passing		
SMU	Rushing		
SMU	Receiving		
Memphis	Passing		
Memphis	Rushing		
Memphis	Receiving		

=== Temple ===
	1	2	3	4	Total
Owls	14	14	7	14	49
Mustangs	7	7	21	24	59

Statistics	TEM	SMU
First downs		
Total yards		
Rushing yards		
Passing yards		
Turnovers		
Time of possession		

Team	Category	Player	Statistics
Temple	Passing		
Temple	Rushing		
Temple	Receiving		
SMU	Passing		
SMU	Rushing		
SMU	Receiving		

=== At Cincinnati ===
	1	2	3	4	Total
Mustangs	7	3	0	15	25
Bearcats	0	14	14	0	28

Statistics	SMU	CIN
First downs		
Total yards		
Rushing yards		
Passing yards		
Turnovers		
Time of possession		

Team	Category	Player	Statistics
SMU	Passing		
SMU	Rushing		
SMU	Receiving		
Cincinnati	Passing		
Cincinnati	Rushing		
Cincinnati	Receiving		

=== UConn ===
	1	2	3	4	Total
Huskies	0	7	7	7	21
Mustangs	7	14	7	10	38

Statistics	CONN	SMU
First downs		
Total yards		
Rushing yards		
Passing yards		
Turnovers		
Time of possession		

Team	Category	Player	Statistics
UConn	Passing		
UConn	Rushing		
UConn	Receiving		
SMU	Passing		
SMU	Rushing		
SMU	Receiving		

=== At South Florida ===
	1	2	3	4	Total
Mustangs	3	0	13	0	16
Bulls	0	0	0	6	6

Statistics	SMU	USF
First downs		
Total yards		
Rushing yards		
Passing yards		
Turnovers		
Time of possession		

Team	Category	Player	Statistics
SMU	Passing		
SMU	Rushing		
SMU	Receiving		
South Florida	Passing		
South Florida	Rushing		
South Florida	Receiving		

=== At Houston ===
	1	2	3	4	Total
Mustangs	0	0	0	0	0
Cougars	10	14	10	0	34

Statistics	SMU	HOU
First downs		
Total yards		
Rushing yards		
Passing yards		
Turnovers		
Time of possession		

Team	Category	Player	Statistics
SMU	Passing		
SMU	Rushing		
SMU	Receiving		
Houston	Passing		
Houston	Rushing		
Houston	Receiving		

=== No. 15 UCF ===
	1	2	3	4	Total
No. 15 Knights	0	3	14	0	17
Mustangs	3	7	3	0	13

Statistics	UCF	SMU
First downs		
Total yards		
Rushing yards		
Passing yards		
Turnovers		
Time of possession		

Team	Category	Player	Statistics
UCF	Passing		
UCF	Rushing		
UCF	Receiving		
SMU	Passing		
SMU	Rushing		
SMU	Receiving		
