= Alvin Maxson =

American football player (1951-2022)

No. 28, 24, 36
- Position: Running back

Personal information
- Born: November 12, 1951; Beaumont, Texas, U.S.
- Died: June 14, 2022 (aged 70); Rio Rancho, New Mexico, U.S.
- Listed height: 5 ft 11 in (1.80 m)
- Listed weight: 205 lb (93 kg)

Career information
- High school: Hebert (Beaumont)
- College: Southern Methodist
- NFL draft: 1974: 8th round, 201st overall pick

Career history
- New Orleans Saints (1974–1976); Pittsburgh Steelers (1977); Chicago Bears (1978); Pittsburgh Steelers (1978); Tampa Bay Buccaneers (1978); Houston Oilers (1978); New York Giants (1978)

Awards and highlights
- Super Bowl champion (XIII); 3× First-team All-SWC (1971, 1972, 1973)

Career NFL statistics
- Rushing attempts: 360
- Rushing yards: 1,270
- Rushing TDs: 6
- Stats at Pro Football Reference

Alvin Earl Maxson (November 12, 1951 - June 14, 2022) was an American professional football player who was a running back in the National Football League (NFL). He was selected by the New Orleans Saints in the eighth round of the 1974 NFL draft. He played college football for the SMU Mustangs.

Maxson also played for the Pittsburgh Steelers, Chicago Bears, Tampa Bay Buccaneers, Houston Oilers and New York Giants.

He died at the age of 70 on June 14, 2022, in Rio Rancho, New Mexico.
