= Reggie Dupard =

American football player (born 1963)

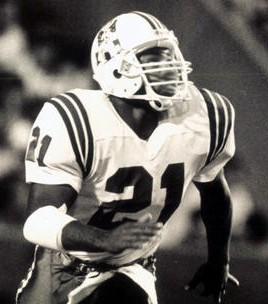
- Dupard playing for the Patriots, circa 1987

No. 21, 25
- Position: Running back

Personal information
- Born: October 30, 1963 (age 63); New Orleans, Louisiana, U.S.
- Listed height: 5 ft 11 in (1.80 m)
- Listed weight: 206 lb (93 kg)

Career information
- High school: John Curtis Christian (River Ridge, Louisiana)
- College: SMU
- NFL draft: 1986: 1st round, 26th overall pick

Career history
- New England Patriots (1986–1989); Washington Redskins (1989–1990)

Awards and highlights
- Consensus All-American (1985); First-team All-SWC (1984)

Career NFL statistics
- Rushing yards: 704
- Rushing average: 3.2
- Touchdowns: 6
- Stats at Pro Football Reference

Jon Reginald Dupard (born October 30, 1963) is an American former professional football player who was a running back for five seasons in the National Football League (NFL). Dupard was selected by the New England Patriots in the first round of the 1986 NFL draft with the 26th overall pick. His best season was arguably in 1987 when he had 318 yards on 94 carries; He also had three touchdowns that season. He played for the Patriots until he was traded to the Washington Redskins midway through the 1989 NFL season. Dupard prepped at John Curtis Christian High School in River Ridge, Louisiana, and went on to play college football for the SMU Mustangs. He was drafted one spot behind his college teammate Roderick Jones.

After retirement from the NFL, Dupard returned to SMU to complete his undergraduate degree, and graduated in 1999. Today, he works for high schools in Texas to help marginalized youth finish high school and inspires them to continue to pursue higher education and/or career certifications. Dupard is also cofounder with his wife of Fit and Faithful Living, a charity whose mission is to grow youth and families strong by positively impacting lives through after-school programs, summer camps, family health and wellness programs, education, awareness, and empowerment.
