= Paul Page (American football) =

American football player (1927–1997)

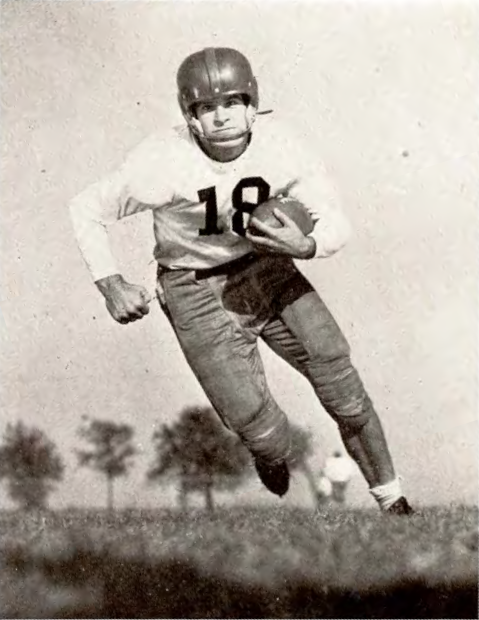
- Page c. 1948

No. 88
- Positions: Halfback, defensive back

Personal information
- Born: September 16, 1927; Eldorado, Texas, U.S.
- Died: February 15, 1997 (aged 69); Tom Green County, Texas, U.S.
- Listed height: 6 ft 0 in (1.83 m)
- Listed weight: 180 lb (82 kg)

Career information
- High school: Eldorado
- College: SMU (1945–1948)
- NFL draft: 1949: 1st round, 4th overall pick

Career history
- Baltimore Colts (1949)

Career AAFC statistics
- Rushing yards: 81
- Rushing average: 3.2
- Receptions: 4
- Receiving yards: 62
- Stats at Pro Football Reference

Paul Eugene Page (September 16, 1927 – February 15, 1997) was an American football halfback and defensive back. He played college football for SMU from 1945 to 1948 and professional football in the All-America Football Conference (AAFC) for the Baltimore Colts in 1949.

== Early life ==
Page was born in 1927 in Eldorado, Texas. He attended Eldorado High School. He won three letters each in football and basketball at Eldorado and was captain of both the football and basketball teams.

== SMU ==
Page enrolled at Southern Methodist University and played college football for the SMU Mustangs from 1945 to 1948. He began the 1945 season as a substitute end and became a starting halfback by the end of the year. He was also a return specialist for SMU, returning a punt 65 yards against Santa Clara in October 1948.

Along with Doak Walker and Dick McKissack, he was a member of the 1947 and 1948 SMU Mustangs football teams that compiled a combined 18–1–3 record and won consecutive Southwest Conference championships. At the end of the 1948 season, Page was selected by the Austin American-Statesman for the "utility role" on its All-Southwest Conference football team; the paper called Page "perhaps the league's most underrated player."

== Professional football ==
Page was selected by the New York Giants with the fourth overall pick in the 1949 NFL draft. He instead signed in June 1949 with the Baltimore Colts of the All-America Football Conference (AAFC). He was rated by The Baltimore Sun as "the prized catch on the Colts' roster," a player expected to fill a noticeable gap in the team's defensive secondary. In a rookie season cut short by ankle injuries in early September and late November, Page was used principally as a dfensive specialist but also played on offense. He appeared in eight games for the Colts in 1948, tallying 81 rushing yards on 25 carries and 62 receiving yards on four receptions.

== Later life ==
Page graduated from SMU with a business degree in 1949. He also married Lucy Huckaby in 1949. He became an oilman and rancher in West Texas. He was inducted into the SMU Hall of Fame in 1981. He died in 1997 at age 69 at the Shannon Medical Center in San Angelo, Texas.
