= Ramon Flanigan =

American football player and coach

Current position
- Title: Director of former player relations
- Team: SMU
- Conference: AAC

Playing career
- 1993–1996: SMU
- 1997: Hamburg Blue Devils
- Position: Quarterback

Coaching career (HC unless noted)
- 1999: North Texas (WR)
- 2000–2001: North Texas (QB)
- 2002–2007: North Texas (OC/QB)
- 2010–2012: Mississippi Valley State (OC/QB)
- 2013–2014: Lincoln
- 2015–2016: Lamar (QB)

Head coaching record
- Overall: 2–18

Ramon Flanigan is an American former football player and coach. He is the director of former player relations at Southern Methodist University (SMU). Flanigan served as the head football coach at Lincoln University in Chester County, Pennsylvania from 2013 to 2014, compiling a record of 2–18. As a college football player, he was a quarterback at SMU.

== Head coaching record ==
Year	Team	Overall	Conference	Standing	Bowl/playoffs
Lincoln Lions (Central Intercollegiate Athletic Association) (2013–2014)
2013	Lincoln	1–9	0–7	6th (Northern)	
2014	Lincoln	1–9	0–7	6th (Northern)	
Lincoln:		2–18	0–14		
Total:		2–18			
