= Emanuel Tolbert =

American gridiron football player (born 1958)

Profile
- Position: Slotback; Wide receiver

Personal information
- Born: December 2, 1958 (age 67); Little Rock, Arkansas, U.S.

Career information
- College: Southern Methodist
- NFL draft: 1980: 7th round, 183rd overall pick

Career history
- 1980–1981: Saskatchewan Roughriders
- 1981–1984, 1989: Toronto Argonauts
- 1985–1988: Calgary Stampeders
- 1990: British Columbia Lions

Awards and highlights
- Grey Cup champion (1983); CFL All-Star (1988); Consensus All-American (1978); 2× First-team All-SWC (1977, 1978)

Emanuel Tolbert (born September 2, 1958) is a former American college and professional football player who was a slotback and wide receiver in the Canadian Football League (CFL) for eleven seasons during the 1980s and early 1990s. Tolbert played college football for Southern Methodist University, where he was an All-American. He played professionally for the Saskatchewan Roughriders, Toronto Argonauts, Calgary Stampeders and British Columbia Lions of the CFL, and played a key role in the Argonauts' 1983 Grey Cup victory by recovering a fumble on the game-winning drive.

Tolbert was convicted of rape and violating a minor in 2001. He was sentenced to 15 years in prison for the rape plus four years for violation, to be served concurrently.
