= Putt Choate =

American football player (born 1956)

No. 55, 57
- Position: Linebacker

Personal information
- Born: December 11, 1956 (age 69); Big Spring, Texas, U.S.
- Listed height: 6 ft 0 in (1.83 m)
- Listed weight: 225 lb (102 kg)

Career information
- High school: Coahoma (TX)
- College: SMU
- NFL draft: 1979: undrafted

Career history
- Atlanta Falcons (1979)*; Houston Oilers (1980)*; Denver Gold (1983); San Antonio Gunslingers (1984-1985); Green Bay Packers (1987)
- * Offseason or practice squad member only

Awards and highlights
- All-USFL (1983); 2× First-team All-SWC (1977, 1978)

Career NFL statistics
- Fumble recoveries: 1
- Stats at Pro Football Reference

Mark Putnam "Putt" Choate (born December 11, 1956) is a former linebacker in the National Football League (NFL). Choate, who was born in Big Spring, Texas, attended Coahoma High School before attending Southern Methodist University (SMU). At SMU, Choate set the record for the most tackles in a season with 253 and the most in a career with 649. In 2020, he was inducted into SMU's hall of fame. Choate played in the NFL for the Atlanta Falcons in 1979 and the Green Bay Packers in 1987. Between those stints, he played for the Denver Gold and the San Antonio Gunslingers in the United States Football League.
