= Keylon Kincade =

American football player (born 1982)

No. 26, 27
- Position: Running back

Personal information
- Born: August 20, 1982 (age 44); Troup, Texas, U.S.
- Listed height: 5 ft 11 in (1.80 m)
- Listed weight: 208 lb (94 kg)

Career information
- High school: Troup
- College: SMU
- NFL draft: 2004: undrafted

Career history
- New York Giants (2004)*; Cologne Centurions (2005); Dallas Cowboys (2004–2006)
- * Offseason or practice squad member only
- Stats at Pro Football Reference

Keylon Kincade (born August 20, 1982) is an American former professional football player who was a running back in the National Football League (NFL). He played college football for the SMU Mustangs and was signed as an undrafted free agent with the New York Giants.

Kincade enjoyed an all-conference career at SMU, leading the WAC in yards from scrimmage in 2003, as well as carries in both 2002 and 2003. His 2002 (1,279 yards) and 2003 (1,290 yards) currently rank #3 and #4 for single season totals in school history.

Kincade signed with the Dallas Cowboys in September 2004 and remained with the team until the 2006–2007 season. Kincade spent 2005 with the Cologne Centurions of NFL Europe. In 2006, he appeared in one game for the Cowboys.
