= Brashard Smith =

American football player (born 2003)

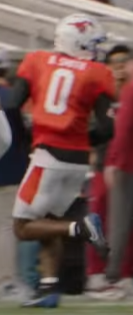

No. 24 – Kansas City Chiefs
- Positions: Running back, kickoff returner
- Roster status: Injured reserve

Personal information
- Born: April 11, 2003 (age 23); Richmond Heights, Florida, U.S.
- Listed height: 5 ft 10 in (1.78 m)
- Listed weight: 196 lb (89 kg)

Career information
- High school: Miami Palmetto (Pinecrest, Florida)
- College: Miami (2021–2023); SMU (2024)
- NFL draft: 2025: 7th round, 228th overall pick

Career history
- Kansas City Chiefs (2025–present)

Awards and highlights
- First-team All-ACC (2024); Second-team All-ACC (2023)

Career NFL statistics as of 2026
- Rushing yards: 151
- Rushing average: 3.4
- Rushing touchdowns: 0
- Receptions: 26
- Receiving yards: 176
- Receiving touchdowns: 1
- Stats at Pro Football Reference

Brashard Smith (born April 11, 2003) is an American professional football running back and kickoff returner for the Kansas City Chiefs of the National Football League (NFL). He played college football for the Miami Hurricanes and SMU Mustangs and was selected by the Chiefs in the seventh round of the 2025 NFL draft.

== Early life ==
Smith was born in Richmond Heights, Florida. He attended Arvida Middle School in Kendall, Florida and attended Miami Palmetto Senior High School in Pinecrest, Florida. Smith was rated as a three-star recruit coming out of high school, and originally committed to play college football at the University of Florida. However, Smith flipped his commitment to the University of Miami.

== College career ==
=== Miami (FL) ===
As a freshman in 2021, Smith hauled in 14 receptions for 199 yards and two touchdowns, while also rushing for 23 yards. In Week 7 of the 2022 season, he brought in six receptions for 76 yards in a win over Virginia Tech. Smith finished the 2022 season with 33 receptions for 308 yards, while also adding 22 yards on the ground, and returning 11 kickoffs for 250 yards. In Week 2 of the 2023 season, he returned a kickoff 98 yards for a touchdown in a win over Texas A&M.

On December 30, 2023, Smith announced that he would be entering the NCAA transfer portal.

=== SMU ===
On January 15, 2024, Smith announced that he would be transferring to SMU.

== Professional career ==
Pre-draft measurables
| Height | Weight | Arm length | Hand span | Wingspan | 40-yard dash | 10-yard split | 20-yard split | 20-yard shuttle | Vertical jump | Broad jump |
|---|---|---|---|---|---|---|---|---|---|---|
| 5 ft 9 7/8 in (1.77 m) | 194 lb (88 kg) | 30 1/2 in (0.77 m) | 8 3/4 in (0.22 m) | 6 ft 2 in (1.88 m) | 4.39 s | 1.58 s | 2.57 s | 4.28 s | 32.5 in (0.83 m) | 9 ft 9 in (2.97 m) |
All values from NFL Combine/Pro Day

Smith was selected by the Kansas City Chiefs with the 228th overall pick in the seventh round of the 2025 NFL draft. He made his NFL debut on September 5, 2025, returning two kickoffs for 63 yards in the Chiefs' 27–21 loss to the Los Angeles Chargers in Sao Paulo, Brazil. Smith caught his first career touchdown from Chris Oladokun on Christmas against the Denver Broncos. He was placed on injured reserve on October 24 due to a hamstring injury.
