= Ben Hicks =

American football quarterback

No. 6, 8
- Position: Quarterback

Personal information
- Listed height: 6 ft 1 in (1.85 m)
- Listed weight: 217 lb (98 kg)

Career information
- High school: Midway (Waco, Texas)
- College: SMU (2015–2018); Arkansas (2019)
- Stats at ESPN

Ben Hicks is an American former college football quarterback. He played for the SMU Mustangs and Arkansas Razorbacks.

== Early life ==
Hicks attended Midway High School in Waco, Texas. As a senior he threw for over 3,400 yards and 28 touchdowns. He was invited to the Elite 11, where he finished with a high rank among the other participants. A four-star recruit, Hicks was once committed to Houston, before he flipped his commitment to play at Southern Methodist University.

== College career ==
=== SMU ===
After redshirting in 2015, Hicks started 11 games in 2016, after an injury to Matt Davis in the season opener. He finished his redshirt freshman season passing for 2,930 yards, 19 touchdowns, and 15 interceptions. In 2017, he passed for 3,569 yards and 33 touchdowns. At the conclusion of the 2018 season, Hicks announced his decision to transfer.

Hicks finished his time at SMU totaling 9,081 yards, 71 touchdowns, and 34 interceptions. He was the program's leader in career passing yards until Kevin Jennings broke his record in 2026.

=== Arkansas ===
Hicks transferred to the University of Arkansas, reuniting with his former coach, Chad Morris. Entering the 2019 season opener against Portland State, Hicks was named the Razorback's starting quarterback. In his first start with Arkansas, he completed 14 of 29 passes for 143 yards, in a 20–13 win. After struggling the following week against Ole Miss, Hicks was benched in favor of Nick Starkel. He finished the season throwing for 738 yards, two touchdowns, and two interceptions.

Hicks finished his career throwing for 9,819 yards, 73 touchdowns, and 36 interceptions.

=== Statistics ===
Year	Team	Games			Passing								Rushing			
Year	Team	GP	GS	Record	Comp	Att	Pct	Yards	Avg	TD	Int	Rate	Att	Yards	Avg	TD
2015	SMU	Redshirt (redshirt)														
2016	SMU	12	11	4–7	234	422	55.5	2,930	6.9	19	15	121.5	41	-83	-2.0	2
2017	SMU	13	13	7–6	276	472	58.5	3,569	7.6	33	12	140.0	54	47	0.9	1
2018	SMU	12	9	3–6	208	372	55.9	2,582	6.9	19	7	127.3	45	-68	-1.5	0
2019	Arkansas	7	4	1–3	65	137	47.4	738	5.4	2	2	94.6	21	19	0.5	0
Career		44	37	15−22	783	1,403	55.8	9,819	7.0	73	36	126.6	161	-94	-0.6	3
