= James Proche =

American football player (born 1996)

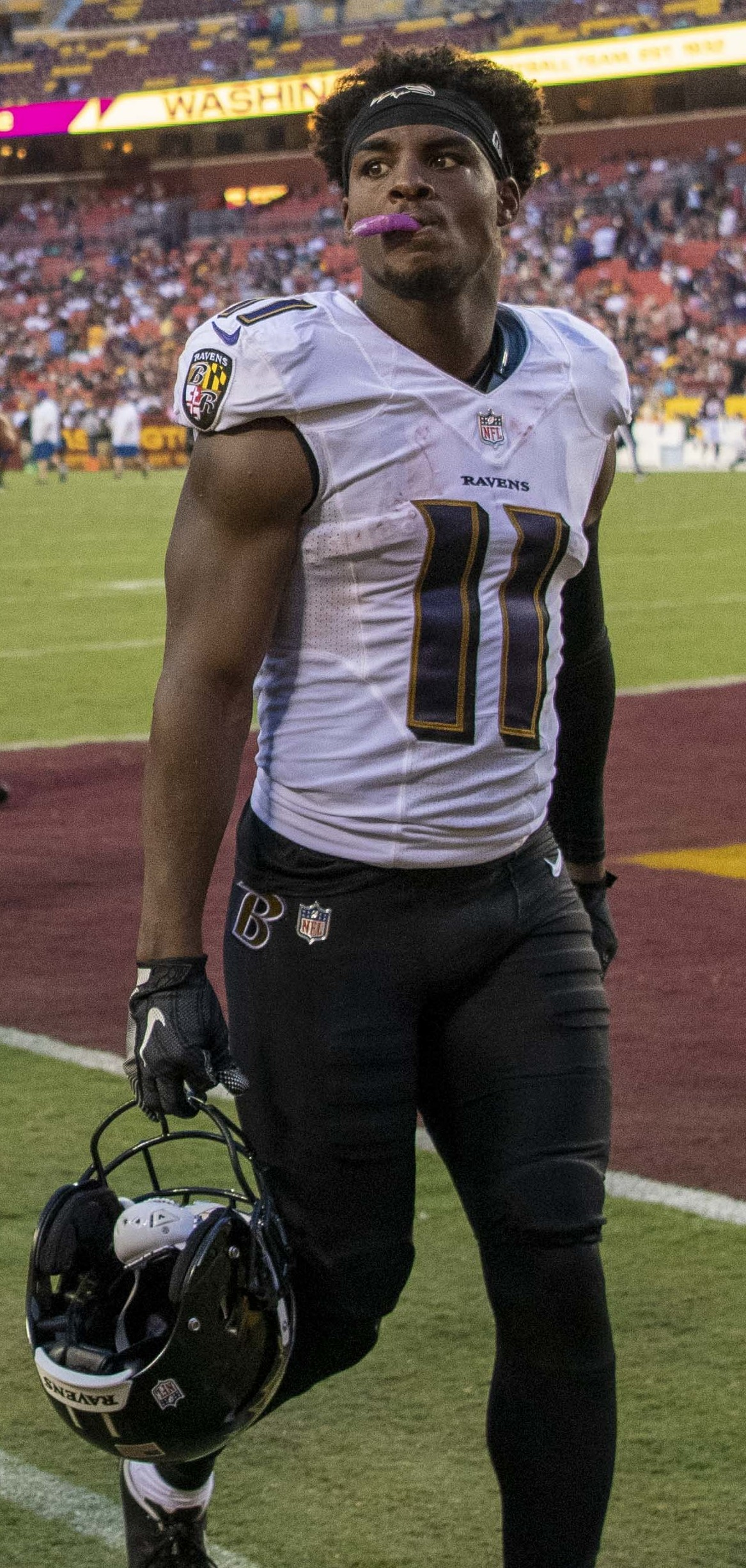
- Proche with the Baltimore Ravens in 2021

Profile
- Position: Wide receiver

Personal information
- Born: September 21, 1996 (age 30); Dallas, Texas, U.S.
- Listed height: 5 ft 11 in (1.80 m)
- Listed weight: 193 lb (88 kg)

Career information
- High school: DeSoto (DeSoto, Texas)
- College: SMU (2015–2019)
- NFL draft: 2020: 6th round, 201st overall pick

Career history
- Baltimore Ravens (2020–2022); Cleveland Browns (2023–2024); Tennessee Titans (2025); Cleveland Browns (2026)*; Arizona Cardinals (2026)*
- * Offseason or practice squad member only

Awards and highlights
- PFWA All-Rookie Team (2020); Second-team All-American (2019); NCAA receptions co-leader (2019); 2× First-team All-AAC (2018, 2019)

Career NFL statistics as of 2025
- Receptions: 34
- Receiving yards: 364
- Return yards: 651
- Stats at Pro Football Reference

James Proche II (/proʊˈʃeɪ/ proh-SHAY; born September 21, 1996) is an American professional football wide receiver. He played college football for the SMU Mustangs and was selected by the Baltimore Ravens in the sixth round of the 2020 NFL draft.

== Early life ==
Proche grew up in Dallas, Texas and originally attended Red Oak before transferring to DeSoto High School for his senior year due to academic concerns with Prime Prep. He caught 18 passes for 335 yards and a touchdown in his only season with the Eagles, playing in only seven games due to suffering kidney failure during summer training camp. Rated a three-star recruit, Proche committed to play college football at SMU over offers from Colorado State, Louisville, Maryland, TCU and Wake Forest among other offers.

== College career ==
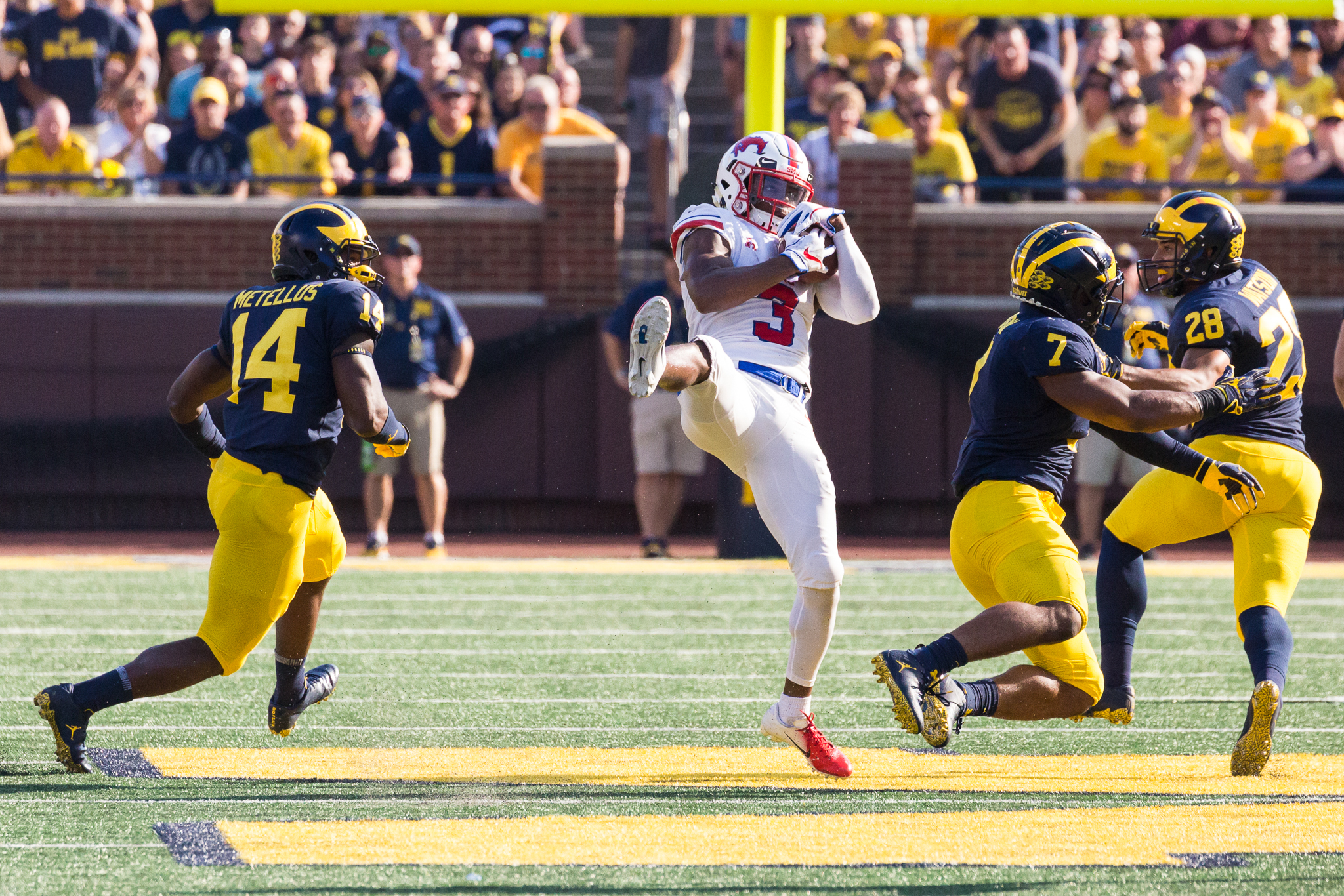
Proche with SMU on September 15, 2018

Proche redshirted his true freshman season. The following season, Proche finished second on the team with 57 receptions, 709 yards and six touchdown catches. As a redshirt sophomore Proche caught 40 passes for 816 yards and six touchdowns and his average of 20.4 yards per catch was 13th-best in the nation. He was named first-team All-American Athletic Conference (AAC) in his redshirt junior year after leading the team with 93 receptions for 1,199 yards and 12 touchdowns. In his final season, Proche caught 111 passes (co-leading the nation in receptions) for 1,225 yard and 15 touchdowns and was again named first-team All-AAC and a second-team All-American by the Football Writers Association of America.

== Professional career ==
Pre-draft measurables
| Height | Weight | Arm length | Hand span | 20-yard shuttle | Three-cone drill | Vertical jump | Bench press |
|---|---|---|---|---|---|---|---|
| 5 ft 10 5/8 in (1.79 m) | 201 lb (91 kg) | 29 3/4 in (0.76 m) | 9 5/8 in (0.24 m) | 4.40 s | 7.27 s | 34.5 in (0.88 m) | 20 reps |
All values from NFL Combine

=== Baltimore Ravens ===
At the 2020 NFL Combine, Proche ranked fourth overall in the bench press with 20 repetitions and 14th in the 20-yard shuttle with a time of 4.40 seconds. Proche was selected in the sixth round with the 201st overall pick in the 2020 NFL draft by the Baltimore Ravens.

Proche made his NFL debut on September 13, 2020, in the season opener against the Cleveland Browns, returning two punts for 26 yards. In Week 11, Proche caught his first pass of the season for a 14-yard gain during a 24–30 overtime loss to the Tennessee Titans. He was placed on the reserve/COVID-19 list by the team on December 16, 2020, and activated three days later. He was named to the PFWA All-Rookie Team.

In 2021, Proche had 16 receptions for 202 yards in 14 games. He appeared in 15 games in the 2022 season. In 2023, he changed his jersey number from #3 to #10, allowing new addition Odell Beckham Jr. to wear #3.

Proche was waived by the Ravens at the end of the 2023 preseason.

=== Cleveland Browns ===
On October 31, 2023, Proche was signed to the Browns practice squad. He was signed to the active roster on November 7. He appeared in ten games in the 2023 season.

Proche re-signed with the Browns on March 19, 2024. He was released on August 27, and re-signed to the practice squad. He was promoted to the active roster on September 14. He was released again on October 12 and re-signed to the practice squad three days later. He appeared in nine games in the 2024 season.

=== Tennessee Titans ===
On March 26, 2025, Proche signed with the Tennessee Titans. He was released on August 26 as part of final roster cuts and re-signed to the practice squad the next day. On November 18, Proche was signed to the active roster.

=== Cleveland Browns (second stint) ===
On October 6, 2026, Proche signed with the Cleveland Browns practice squad. On October 13, he was released.

=== Arizona Cardinals ===
On November 4, 2026, Proche signed with the Arizona Cardinals practice squad. On November 17, he was released.

== NFL career statistics ==
Legend
| **Bold** | Career high |

=== Regular season ===
| Year | Team | GP | Receiving | | | | |
| Year | Team | GP | Rec | Yds | Avg | Lng | TD |
|---|---|---|---|---|---|---|---|
| 2020 | BAL | 14 | 1 | 14 | 14.0 | 14 | 0 |
| 2021 | BAL | 14 | **16** | **202** | **12.6** | **32** | 0 |
| 2022 | BAL | **15** | 8 | 62 | 7.8 | 12 | 0 |
| 2023 | CLE | 10 | 0 | 0 | 0.0 | 0 | 0 |
| 2024 | CLE | 9 | 3 | 21 | 7.0 | 14 | 0 |
| 2025 | TEN | 9 | 6 | 65 | 10.8 | 23 | 0 |
| Career | | 71 | 34 | 364 | 10.7 | 32 | 0 |

== Personal life ==
Proche goes by the nickname "Channel 3". His favorite number and football number is 3. He stated in an interview with SMU that "whenever I'm on the field, I want to put on the best show" which is why he goes by the nickname "Channel 3". In May 2023, Proche's mother, Tasha Le'Shel Seastrong, passed away.
