= Courtland Sutton =

American football player (born 1995)

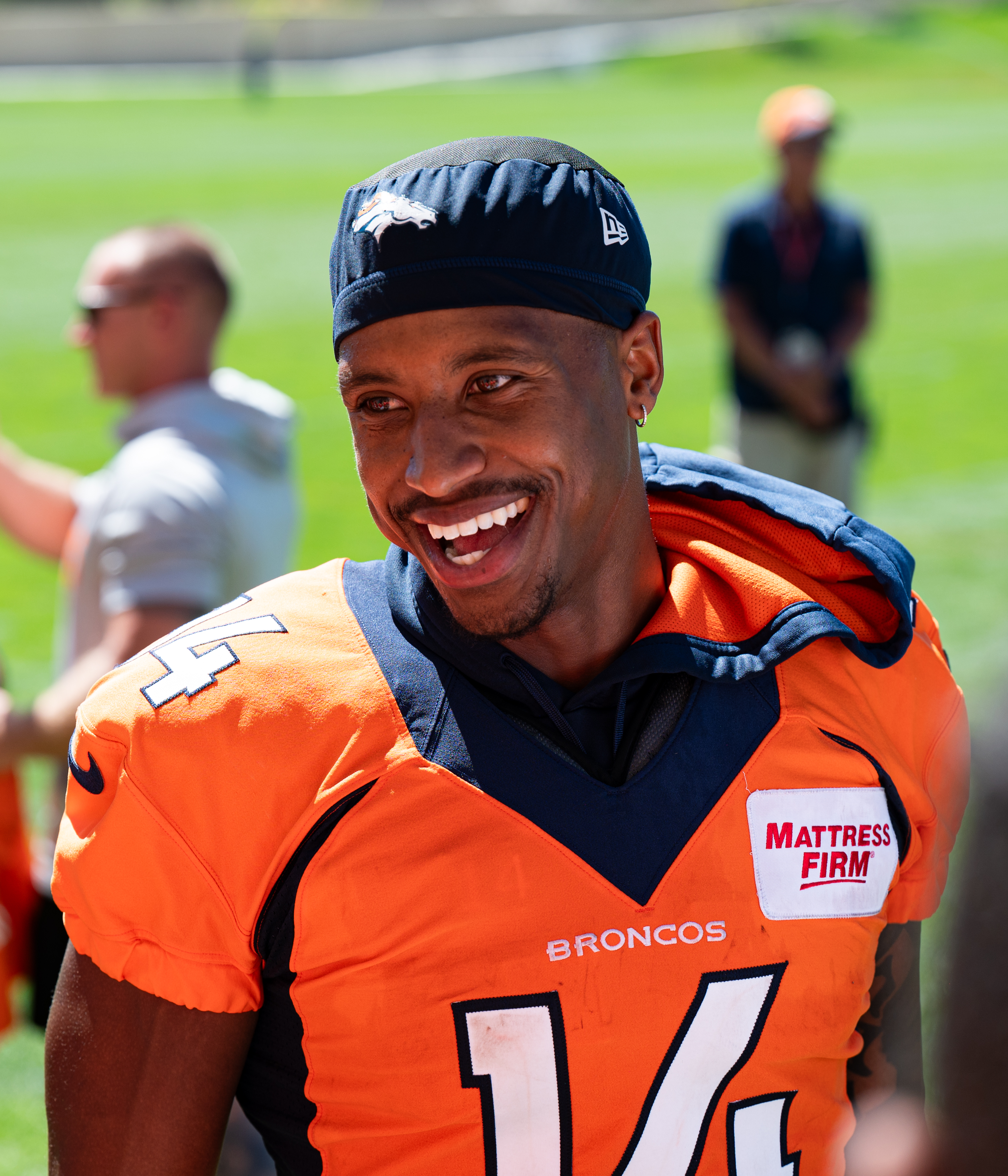
- Sutton with the Denver Broncos in 2023

No. 14 – Denver Broncos
- Position: Wide receiver
- Roster status: Active

Personal information
- Born: October 10, 1995 (age 31); Brenham, Texas, U.S.
- Listed height: 6 ft 4 in (1.93 m)
- Listed weight: 216 lb (98 kg)

Career information
- High school: Brenham
- College: SMU (2014–2017)
- NFL draft: 2018: 2nd round, 40th overall pick

Career history
- Denver Broncos (2018–present)

Awards and highlights
- 2× Pro Bowl (2019, 2025); 2× First-team All-AAC (2016, 2017)

Career NFL statistics as of Week 6, 2026
- Receptions: 466
- Receiving yards: 6,480
- Receiving touchdowns: 40
- Stats at Pro Football Reference

Courtland Jaleel Sutton (born October 10, 1995) is an American professional football wide receiver for the Denver Broncos of the National Football League (NFL). He played college football for the SMU Mustangs, and was selected by the Broncos in the second round of the 2018 NFL draft.

== Early life ==
Sutton attended Brenham High School in Brenham, Texas, where he played high school football. As a senior, he was named first-team All-District as a tight end and second-team as a safety. Brenham finished the 2013 season with a 14–2 record, losing to Aledo in the UIL 4A Division 2 state championship game. Regarded a three-star prospect by ESPN, Sutton committed to Southern Methodist University over offers from BYU, Colorado and Rice.

== College career ==
Sutton played in two games as a true freshman at SMU in 2014, before suffering an injury and taking a medical redshirt. As a redshirt freshman in 2015, he started all 12 games, recording 49 receptions for 862 yards and nine touchdowns. After the season, he played in three games for SMU's basketball team. As a sophomore in 2016, Sutton started all 12 games and had 76 receptions for 1,246 yards and 10 touchdowns. Sutton considered entering the 2017 NFL draft, but instead, he decided to return to college for his redshirt junior year. On December 22, 2017, Sutton officially declared that he would enter the 2018 NFL draft after completing his junior year.

== Professional career ==
Pre-draft measurables
Height	Weight	Arm length	Hand span	Wingspan	40-yard dash	10-yard split	20-yard split	20-yard shuttle	Three-cone drill	Vertical jump	Broad jump	Bench press
6 ft 3 3/8 in (1.91 m)	218 lb (99 kg)	32 3/8 in (0.82 m)	9 3/4 in (0.25 m)	6 ft 7 1/4 in (2.01 m)	4.54 s	1.50 s	2.61 s	4.11 s	6.57 s	35.5 in (0.90 m)	10 ft 6 in (3.20 m)	18 reps
All values from NFL Combine/Pro Day

=== 2018 ===
The Denver Broncos selected Sutton in the second round (40th overall) of the 2018 NFL draft. He was the third wide receiver selected that year.

Sutton made his NFL debut with two receptions for 45 yards in the Broncos' season-opening 27–24 victory over the Seattle Seahawks. In Week 5, against the New York Jets, he scored his first professional touchdown. He finished his rookie season with 42 receptions for 704 yards and four touchdowns.

=== 2019 ===
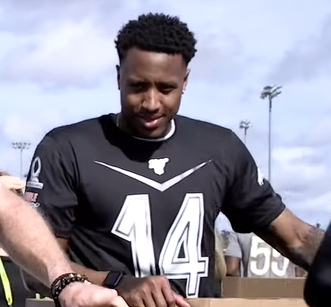
Sutton at the 2020 Pro Bowl

In Week 1 against the Oakland Raiders on Monday Night Football, Sutton caught seven passes for 120 yards in the 24–16 loss. In Week 4 against the Jacksonville Jaguars, Sutton caught six passes for 62 yards and two touchdowns in the 26–24 loss. In Week 5 against the Los Angeles Chargers, Sutton caught four passes for 92 yards, including a 70-yard receiving touchdown, as the Broncos won their first game of the season by a score of 20–13. In Week 11 against the Minnesota Vikings, Sutton caught five passes for 113 yards in the 27–23 loss In Week 13 against the Chargers, Sutton caught four passes for 74 yards, and rookie quarterback Drew Lock's first two touchdown passes in the NFL, during the 23–20 victory. Overall, in the 2019 season, Sutton recorded 72 receptions for 1,112 receiving yards and six receiving touchdowns.

On January 15, Sutton was moved into the Pro Bowl roster as an alternate, replacing the injured DeAndre Hopkins, who opted to not play in the game due to a rib injury suffered in a Divisional Round playoff game versus the Kansas City Chiefs. It was Sutton's first Pro Bowl selection, and with the selection, Sutton became the fastest Broncos wide receiver to earn a Pro Bowl nod, accomplishing it in just his second season in the NFL, breaking Demaryius Thomas's record.

=== 2020 ===
After missing Week 1 with a shoulder injury, Sutton made his 2020 debut the following week against the Pittsburgh Steelers. During the game, Sutton caught three passes for 66 yards before exiting the game with a knee injury. The next day, an MRI confirmed that Sutton suffered a torn ACL and he was placed on season-ending injured reserve on September 22, 2020.

=== 2021 ===
In Week 2, against the Jaguars, he had nine receptions for 159 receiving yards in the 23–13 victory. In Week 5, against the Steelers, he had seven receptions for 12 receiving yards and one receiving touchdown in the 27–19 loss. On November 22, 2021, Sutton signed a four-year $60.8 million contract extension with the Broncos through the 2025 season. Sutton finished the season with 58 receptions for 776 yards and two touchdowns.

=== 2022 ===
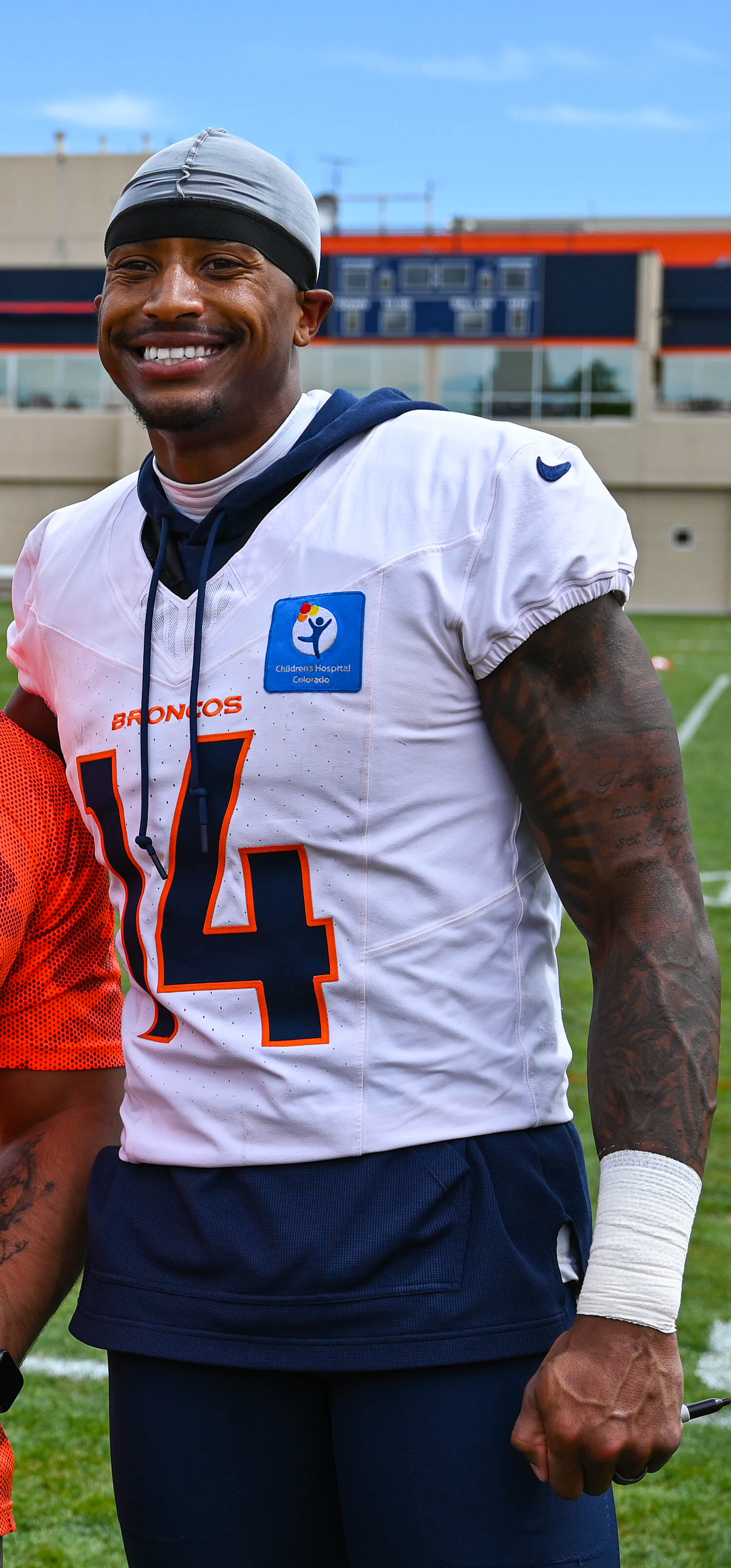
Sutton in 2024

In Week 2, against the Houston Texans, Sutton had seven receptions for 122 receiving yards in the 16–9 victory. In the 2022 season, he played in 15 games, making 64 receptions for 829 receiving yards with two receiving touchdowns.

=== 2023 ===
In the 2023 season, Sutton appeared in and started 14 games. He finished with 59 receptions for 772 yards and ten touchdowns. He had five consecutive games with a touchdown from Week 6 to Week 11. In Week 10 against the Buffalo Bills, Sutton caught a touchdown pass from Russell Wilson at the very edge of the end zone, barely tapping both of his feet in bounds. The catch was statistically the most improbable completion of the Next Gen Stats era, with only a 3.2% probability of succeeding.

=== 2024 ===
In Week 9, against the Baltimore Ravens, Sutton had seven receptions for 122 yards in addition to a passing touchdown thrown to Bo Nix on a trick play. In Week 12, against the Las Vegas Raiders, he had two receiving touchdowns in the 29–19 win. He finished the 2024 season with 81 receptions for 1,081 yards and eight touchdowns helping the Broncos make the playoffs for the first time since 2015.

=== 2025 ===
On July 28, 2025, Sutton signed a four-year, $92 million ($41 million guaranteed) contract extension with the Broncos. He had 74 receptions for 1,017 yards and seven touchdowns in the 2025 season. He scored a receiving touchdown, which was the first of his postseason career, on Denver's lone score in the AFC Championship loss to the Patriots. He was voted as the 68th best player in the league on the NFL Top 100 Players of 2026 list.

== Career statistics ==
=== NFL ===
==== Regular season ====
Year	Team	Games		Receiving					Rushing					Fumbles	
Year	Team	GP	GS	Rec	Yds	Avg	Lng	TD	Att	Yds	Avg	Lng	TD	Fum	Lost
2018	DEN	16	9	42	704	16.8	42	4	1	-1	-1.0	-1	0	0	0
2019	DEN	16	14	72	1,112	15.4	70	6	3	17	5.7	9	0	2	0
2020	DEN	1	1	3	66	22.0	45	0	0	0	0.0	0	0	0	0
2021	DEN	17	16	58	776	13.4	55	2	0	0	0.0	0	0	0	0
2022	DEN	15	15	64	829	13.0	51	2	1	5	5.0	5	0	0	0
2023	DEN	16	14	59	772	13.1	46	10	0	0	0.0	0	0	3	3
2024	DEN	17	13	81	1,081	13.3	47	8	0	0	0.0	0	0	1	1
2025	DEN	17	16	74	1,017	13.7	52	7	0	0	0.0	0	0	0	0
2026	DEN	6	5	13	123	9.5	27	1	0	0	0.0	0	0	0	0
Career		121	103	466	6,480	13.9	70	40	5	21	4.2	9	0	6	4

==== Postseason ====
Year	Team	Games		Receiving					Rushing					Fumbles	
Year	Team	GP	GS	Rec	Yds	Avg	Lng	TD	Att	Yds	Avg	Lng	TD	Fum	Lost
2024	DEN	1	1	5	75	15.0	21	0	0	0	0.0	0	0	0	0
2025	DEN	2	2	7	70	10.0	25	1	0	0	0.0	0	0	0	0
Career		3	3	12	145	12.1	25	1	0	0	0.0	0	0	0	0

=== College ===
Season	Team	Conf	GP	Receiving			
Season	Team	Conf	GP	Rec	Yds	Avg	TD
2014	SMU	American	3	2	27	13.5	0
2015	SMU	American	12	49	862	17.6	9
2016	SMU	American	12	76	1,246	16.4	10
2017	SMU	American	13	68	1,085	16.0	12
Career			40	195	3,220	16.5	31
