= Delontae Scott =

American football player (born 1997)

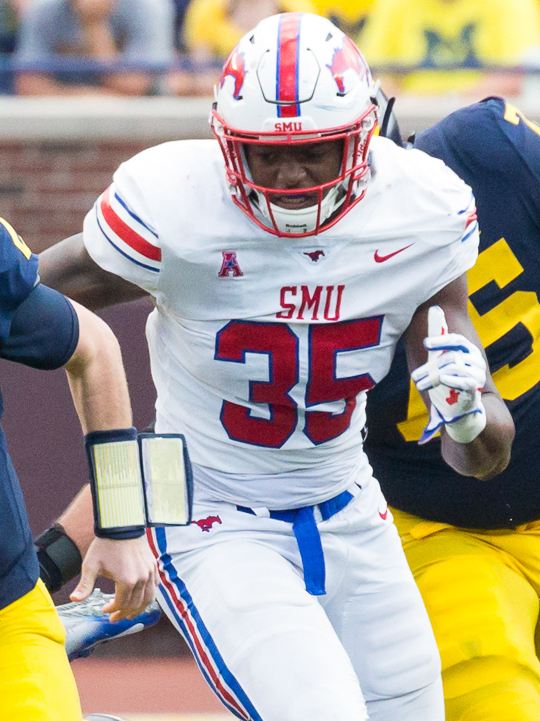
- Scott with SMU in 2018

Profile
- Position: Outside linebacker

Personal information
- Born: January 21, 1997 (age 29); Irving, Texas, U.S.
- Listed height: 6 ft 5 in (1.96 m)
- Listed weight: 246 lb (112 kg)

Career information
- High school: Nimitz (Irving, Texas)
- College: SMU
- NFL draft: 2020: undrafted

Career history
- Green Bay Packers (2020)*; Pittsburgh Steelers (2021–2022); Carolina Panthers (2022)*; San Antonio Brahmas (2023); Atlanta Falcons (2023)*; San Antonio Brahmas (2024); Birmingham Stallions (2025); Orlando Storm (2026)*
- * Offseason or practice squad member only

Awards and highlights
- All-XFL Team (2023); Second-team All-AAC (2019)
- Stats at Pro Football Reference

Delontae Scott (born January 21, 1997) is an American football outside linebacker. He played college football at SMU.

== College career ==
Scott was a member of the SMU Mustangs for five seasons, redshirting as a true freshman. As a redshirt senior, he had 10 sacks, 18 tackles for loss, and three forced fumbles and was named second-team All-American Athletic Conference. Scott finished his collegiate career with 97 tackles, 36 tackles for loss, 18 sacks and five forced fumbles in 40 games played.

== Professional career ==
=== Green Bay Packers ===
Scott signed with the Green Bay Packers as an undrafted free agent on April 29, 2020. He was waived on September 5, 2020, and was signed to the practice squad the following day. Scott was placed on the practice squad injured list on December 15, 2020. He was signed to a reserve/futures contract with the Packers on January 25, 2021. Scott was waived on August 31, 2021, at the end of training camp.

=== Pittsburgh Steelers ===
Scott was signed to the Pittsburgh Steelers' practice squad on September 7, 2021. He was elevated to the active roster on November 21, 2021, for the team's Week 11 game against the Los Angeles Chargers. He signed a reserve/future contract with the Steelers on January 18, 2022.

On August 30, 2022, Scott was waived by the Steelers and re-signed to the practice squad. On September 27, he was released.

=== Carolina Panthers ===
On October 18, 2022, Scott was signed to the Carolina Panthers practice squad. He was released on November 7, 2022.

=== San Antonio Brahmas ===
The San Antonio Brahmas selected Scott in the fourth round of the 2023 XFL Supplemental Draft on January 1, 2023. He was released from his contract on August 15, 2023.

=== Atlanta Falcons ===
On August 16, 2023, Scott signed with the Atlanta Falcons. He was released on August 26, 2023.

=== San Antonio Brahmas (second stint) ===
On January 22, 2024, Scott re-signed with the San Antonio Brahmas.

=== Birmingham Stallions ===
On April 7, 2025, Scott signed with the Birmingham Stallions of the United Football League (UFL).

=== Orlando Storm ===
On February 28, 2026, Scott signed with the Orlando Storm of the United Football League (UFL). He was released on March 19.
