= Justin Lawler =

American football player (born 1994)

No. 53
- Position: Linebacker

Personal information
- Born: December 23, 1994 (age 31); Pottsboro, Texas, U.S.
- Listed height: 6 ft 4 in (1.93 m)
- Listed weight: 265 lb (120 kg)

Career information
- High school: Pottsboro
- College: SMU
- NFL draft: 2018: 7th round, 244th overall pick

Career history
- Los Angeles Rams (2018–2021); Tennessee Titans (2022)*
- * Offseason or practice squad member only

Awards and highlights
- Super Bowl champion (LVI); 2× First-team All-AAC (2016, 2017)

Career NFL statistics
- Total tackles: 7
- Stats at Pro Football Reference

Justin Blaine Lawler (born December 23, 1994) is an American former professional football player who was a linebacker in the National Football League (NFL). He played college football for the SMU Mustangs.

== Early life ==
Lawler attended Pottsboro High School in Pottsboro, Texas. He is related to Los Angeles Clippers Hall of Fame commentator Ralph Lawler.

== College career ==
While only ranked as a two-star prospect from Texas, Lawler's first-team all-state selection (124 tackles, 28 tackles for loss, 13 sacks; 44 catches, 719 yards, 11 touchdowns receiving) portended a good career at SMU. The former high school power lifter was ready to play right away, earning time in all 12 games as a true freshman (23 tackles) and getting some time on offense (three-yard touchdown, two-point conversion). Lawler earned the starting job as a sophomore, lining up for every game and leading the Mustangs with 64 tackles, nine for loss while compiling five sacks. His break-out season came in 2016, garnering first-team American Athletic Conference accolades, racking up 65 stops and leading the team with 15 tackles for loss and six sacks. Lawler gained first-team all-conference recognition as a senior, as well, racking up 74 tackles, 15.5 for loss, 9.5 sacks, two forced fumbles, and three blocked kicks for the Mustangs.

== Professional career ==
Pre-draft measurables
Height	Weight	Arm length	Hand span	40-yard dash	10-yard split	20-yard split	20-yard shuttle	Three-cone drill	Vertical jump	Broad jump	Bench press
6 ft 4 1/8 in (1.93 m)	263 lb (119 kg)	32 1/2 in (0.83 m)	9 1/4 in (0.23 m)	5.03 s	1.78 s	2.88 s	4.46 s	7.44 s	30 1/2 in (0.77 m)	8 ft 10 in (2.69 m)	22 reps
All values from Southern Methodist Pro Day

=== Los Angeles Rams ===
Lawler was selected by the Los Angeles Rams in the seventh round (244th overall) of the 2018 NFL draft. During his rookie year in 2018, Lawler played in six games and recorded six tackles.

On September 2, 2019, Lawler was placed on injured reserve after undergoing foot surgery.

On September 5, 2020, Lawler was waived/injured during final roster cuts by the Rams, and subsequently reverted to the team's injured reserve list the next day.

On August 31, 2021, Lawler was waived by the Rams and re-signed to the practice squad the next day. Lawler won his first Super Bowl ring when the Rams defeated the Cincinnati Bengals in Super Bowl LVI.

=== Tennessee Titans ===
On February 23, 2022, Lawler signed with the Tennessee Titans. He was released by the Titans on August 22.
