= Xavier Jones =

American football player (born 1997)

No. 35
- Position: Running back

Personal information
- Born: August 24, 1997 (age 29); Houston, Texas, U.S.
- Listed height: 5 ft 11 in (1.80 m)
- Listed weight: 208 lb (94 kg)

Career information
- High school: Spring
- College: SMU
- NFL draft: 2020: undrafted

Career history
- Los Angeles Rams (2020–2021)

Awards and highlights
- Super Bowl champion (LVI)

Career NFL statistics
- Return yards: 4
- Stats at Pro Football Reference

Xavier Jones (born August 24, 1997) is an American former professional football player who was a running back for the Los Angeles Rams of the National Football League (NFL). He played college football for the SMU Mustangs and signed with the Rams as an undrafted free agent in 2020.

== College career ==
Jones played college football at Southern Methodist University (SMU). He rushed 662 times for 3,436 yards and 45 touchdowns during his career.

== Professional career ==
Jones signed with the Los Angeles Rams as an undrafted free agent on May 4, 2020. He played in 13 games primarily on special teams as a rookie.

On August 31, 2021, Jones was waived/injured by the Rams and placed on injured reserve. Jones became a Super Bowl champion when the Rams defeated the Cincinnati Bengals in Super Bowl LVI. On July 29, 2022, Jones was waived/injured by the Rams and placed on injured reserve. He was waived off of injured reserve on September 6.

On November 28, 2025, Smith announced his retirement from professional football.
