= 2017 Tulane Green Wave football team =

American college football season

2017 Tulane Green Wave football
- Conference: American Athletic Conference
- West Division
- Record: 5–7 (3–5 American)
- Head coach: Willie Fritz (2nd season)
- Offensive coordinator: Doug Ruse (2nd season)
- Offensive scheme: Spread option
- Defensive coordinator: Jack Curtis (2nd season)
- Base defense: 4–2–5
- Home stadium: Yulman Stadium

2017 American Athletic Conference football standings
	Conf.			Overall
Team	W		L	W		L
East Division
No. 6 UCF xy$	8	–	0	13	–	0
No. 21 South Florida	6	–	2	10	–	2
Temple	4	–	4	7	–	6
Cincinnati	2	–	6	4	–	8
UConn	2	–	6	3	–	9
East Carolina	2	–	6	3	–	9
West Division
No. 25 Memphis xy	7	–	1	10	–	3
Houston	5	–	3	7	–	5
Navy	4	–	4	7	–	6
SMU	4	–	4	7	–	6
Tulane	3	–	5	5	–	7
Tulsa	1	–	7	2	–	10
Championship: UCF 62, Memphis 55
$ – Conference champion; x – Division champion/co-champions; y – Championship game participant; As of January 9, 2018; Rankings from AP Poll.

The 2017 Tulane Green Wave football team represented Tulane University in the 2017 NCAA Division I FBS football season. The Green Wave played their home games at Yulman Stadium in New Orleans, Louisiana, and competed in the West Division of the American Athletic Conference. They were led by second-year head coach Willie Fritz. They finished the season 5–7, 3–5 in AAC play to finish in fifth place in the West Division.

== Schedule ==
Tulane announced its 2017 football schedule on February 9, 2017. The 2017 schedule consists of 6 home and away games in the regular season. The Green Wave hosted AAC foes Cincinnati, Houston, South Florida, and Tulsa, and traveled to East Carolina, Memphis, Navy, and SMU.

The Green Wave hosted two of the four non-conference opponents: Army, which is an independent football school, and Grambling State from the Southwestern Athletic Conference. The team traveled to Florida International (FIU) from Conference USA and Oklahoma from the Big 12 Conference.

Date	Time	Opponent	Site	TV	Result	Attendance
September 2	7:00 p.m.	No. 21 (FCS) Grambling State*	Yulman Stadium; New Orleans, LA	ESPN3	W 43–14	15,940
September 9	2:30 p.m.	at Navy	Navy–Marine Corps Memorial Stadium; Annapolis, MD	CBSSN	L 21–23	30,420
September 16	5:00 p.m.	at No. 2 Oklahoma*	Gaylord Family Oklahoma Memorial Stadium; Norman, OK	FSN PPV	L 14–56	86,290
September 23	11:00 a.m.	Army*	Yulman Stadium; New Orleans, LA	CBSSN	W 21–17	16,643
October 7	10:00 a.m.	Tulsa	Yulman Stadium; New Orleans, LA	ESPN3	W 62–28	11,971
October 14	6:00 p.m.	at FIU*	Riccardo Silva Stadium; Miami, FL	CUSA.TV	L 10–23	16,433
October 21	6:00 p.m.	No. 16 South Florida	Yulman Stadium; New Orleans, LA	ESPN2	L 28–34	17,256
October 27	7:00 p.m.	at No. 24 Memphis	Liberty Bowl Memorial Stadium; Memphis, TN	CBSSN	L 26–56	17,989
November 4	3:00 p.m.	Cincinnati^{†}	Yulman Stadium; New Orleans, LA	ESPN3	L 16–17	20,798
November 11	6:00 p.m.	at East Carolina	Dowdy–Ficklen Stadium; Greenville, NC	CBSSN	W 31–24 ^{OT}	36,178
November 18	3:00 p.m.	Houston	Yulman Stadium; New Orleans, LA	ESPNews	W 20–17	19,026
November 25	11:00 a.m.	at SMU	Gerald J. Ford Stadium; Dallas, TX	CBSSN	L 38–41	14,209
*Non-conference game; ^{†}Homecoming; Rankings from AP Poll released prior to game; All times are in Central time

Schedule source:

== Game summaries ==
=== Grambling State ===
	1	2	3	4	Total
No. 21 (FCS) Tigers	0	0	7	7	14
Green Wave	14	10	7	12	43

=== At Navy ===
	1	2	3	4	Total
Green Wave	0	13	0	8	21
Midshipmen	7	7	9	0	23

=== At Oklahoma ===
	1	2	3	4	Total
Green Wave	14	0	0	0	14
No. 2 Sooners	14	14	7	21	56

=== Army ===
	1	2	3	4	Total
Black Knights	0	10	0	7	17
Green Wave	7	7	0	7	21

=== Tulsa ===
	1	2	3	4	Total
Golden Hurricane	7	0	14	7	28
Green Wave	21	27	7	7	62

=== At FIU ===
	1	2	3	4	Total
Green Wave	0	3	7	0	10
Panthers	7	3	3	10	23

=== South Florida ===
	1	2	3	4	Total
No. 16 Bulls	7	13	14	0	34
Green Wave	0	7	7	14	28

=== At Memphis ===
	1	2	3	4	Total
Green Wave	0	12	7	7	26
Tigers	14	21	0	21	56

=== Cincinnati ===
	1	2	3	4	Total
Bearcats	3	7	7	0	17
Green Wave	7	6	0	3	16

=== At East Carolina ===
	1	2	3	4	OT	Total
Green Wave	7	10	7	0	7	31
Pirates	7	7	0	10	0	24

=== Houston ===
	1	2	3	4	Total
Cougars	3	0	7	7	17
Green Wave	3	10	0	7	20

=== At SMU ===
	1	2	3	4	Total
Green Wave	7	14	17	0	38
Mustangs	14	13	7	7	41

== Players in the 2018 NFL draft ==
Player	Position	Round	Pick	NFL club
Parry Nickerson	CB	6	179	New York Jets
Ade Aruna	DE	6	218	Minnesota Vikings

== Roster ==
2017 Tulane Green Wave football team roster
Players
Coaches
Offense

Pos.	#	Name	Class
QB	1	Jonathan Banks	Jr
QB	2	Dane Ledford	Fr
RB	3	Sherman Badie	RSr
QB	4	P.J. Hurst	So
WR	5	Terren Encalade	RJr
RB	6	Corey Dauphine	RSo
WR	7	Devin Glenn	Jr
QB	8	Khalil McClain	Fr
WR	9	Chris Johnson	So
RB	10	Darius Bradwell	So
QB	11	Johnathan Brantley	So
WR	13	Brian Newman	Sr
QB	14	Glen Cuiellette	RJr
WR	15	Jacob Robertson Jr.	RFr
QB	16	Miles Lapeyre	Fr
RB	22	Stephon Huderson	Fr
RB	26	Dontrell Hilliard	Sr
WR	27	Reed Green	Jr
RB	29	Jared Bertrand	Jr
RB	31	Miles Strickland	RFr
TE	40	Connor Prouet	Fr
TE	46	Will Wallace	Fr
RB	47	Andrew Zuckerman	So
OL	50	Tyler Johnson	So
C	51	Junior Diaz	RJr
OL	52	Dominique Briggs	Jr
OL	53	Keyshawn McLeod	RSo
OL	58	Brian Webb	RSo
OL	63	Cameron Jackel	Fr
OL	64	Corey Dublin	Fr
OL	69	Hunter Knighton	GS
OL	70	Timothy Shafter	Fr
OL	71	Leeward Brown	RSo
OT	72	John Leglue	RJr
OT	74	Devon Johnson	RJr
OL	76	John Washington	RSo
OL	79	Joey Claybrook	Fr
WR	80	Andrew Hicks	Jr
WR	81	D.J. Owens	So
WR	82	Jaetavian Toles	Fr
WR	83	Travis Tucker	Fr
TE	84	Charles Jones II	RJr
WR	85	Rocky Ferony	RFr
WR	86	Darnell Mooney	So
WR	87	Kevin LeDee	Fr
WR	88	Jabril Clewis	Jr
TE	89	Kendall Ardoin	RJr

Defense

Pos.	#	Name	Class
DE	1	Ade Aruna	RSr
S	2	Roderic Teamer Jr.	Jr
LB	4	Larry Bryant	So
S	6	Jarrod Franklin	RSr
CB	8	Willie Langham	Fr
S	10	Jeremy Allen	Fr
CB	11	Tre Jackson	RFr
S	12	Sean Harper	So
S	14	Quentin Brown	Fr
S	16	P.J. Hall	So
CB	17	Parry Nickerson	RSr
FS	19	Taris Shenall	Jr
LB	20	Chase Napoleon	So
CB	21	Donnie Lewis Jr.	RJr
CB	23	Jaylon Monroe	Fr
S	24	Eric Lewis	So
S	25	Will Harper	So
LB	28	Marvin Moody	Fr
LB	30	Monty Montgomery	Fr
CB	32	Stephon Lofton	RJr
S	33	Tirise Barge	Fr
DE	34	Patrick Johnson	Fr
LB	35	Lawrence Graham	So
S	36	Chase Kuerschen	Fr
CB	37	Thakarius Keyes	So
LB	38	KJ Vault	Fr
DE	39	Michael Scott	Fr
LB	40	Zachery Harris	RJr
DE	42	Torri Singletary Jr.	Fr
DE	44	Luke Jackson	RSr
DL	48	De'Andre Williams	RFr
DE	54	Quinlan Carroll	RSr
DE	55	Cameron Sample	Fr
LB	56	Rae Juan Marbley	Sr
DE	57	Peter Woullard	RJr
DT	65	Braynon Edwards	RJr
DE	90	Robert Kennedy	RJr
DT	91	Eldrick Washington	RSr
DT	94	Sean Wilson	Sr
DT	95	Paul Staudinger	Sr
DE	98	Nick Kubiet	Fr
DL	99	Justin Walton	Fr

Special teams

Pos.	#	Name	Class
P	41	Enrique Carrasquero	Jr
P	43	Coby Neenan	RFr
PK	45	Randy Harvey	Jr
P	49	Zachary Block	Jr
LS	60	Geron Eatherly	So
PK	62	Merek Glover	So
PK	92	Noah Singer	Fr
LS	93	Austin Streaty	Fr
LS	96	Aaron Golub	Sr

Head coach

- Willie Fritz

Coordinators/assistant coaches

- Alex Atkins – Assistant Head Coach/Offensive Line Coach
- Jack Curtis – Defensive Coordinator/Safeties Coach
- Doug Ruse – Offensive Coordinator/Quarterbacks Coach
- Jamaal Fobbs – Running Backs Coach
- Kevin Peoples – Defensive Line Coach
- Slade Nagle – Tight Ends Coach
- Michael Mutz – Linebackers Coach
- Chris Hampton – Secondary Coach
- Jeff Conway – Wide Receivers Coach
- Johnny Jernigan – Defensive Analyst, Recruiting
- Derrick Sherman – Offensive Analyst, Recruiting
- Chris Couch – Special Teams Analyst/Recruiting
- Donn Landholm – Director, Player Development
- Shane Meyer – Director, Football Operations
- Wes Fritz – Director, Player Personnel
- Kati Morse – Director, New Media
- Kyle Speer – Director, Strength and Conditioning (Head Football)
- Mitchell Bernardo – Director, Football Video Operations
- Brandon Vyhnalek – Assistant Director, Football Video Operations
- Liz Devlin-Ziegler – Senior Program Manager
- Salli Clavelle – On-Campus Recruiting Coordinator
- Mack Helms – Graduate Assistant, Offense
- Jordy Joseph – Graduate Assistant, Offense
- Walker Ashburn – Graduate Assistant, Defense
- Jake Stone – Graduate Assistant, Defense
- Patrick Duffey – Graduate Assistant, Recruiting
- Greg Raynal – Graduate Assistant, Video

Legend

- (C) Team captain
- (S) Suspended
- (I) Ineligible
- Injured
- Redshirt

Roster
