= 2017 Cincinnati Bearcats football team =

American college football season

2017 Cincinnati Bearcats football
- Conference: American Athletic Conference
- East Division
- Record: 4–8 (2–6 The American)
- Head coach: Luke Fickell (1st season)
- Offensive coordinator: Mike Denbrock (1st season)
- Offensive scheme: Multiple
- Defensive coordinator: Marcus Freeman (1st season)
- Base defense: 4–2–5
- Home stadium: Nippert Stadium

2017 American Athletic Conference football standings
| | Conf. | | | Overall |
| Team | W | | L | W | | L |
|---|---|---|---|---|---|---|
East Division
| No. 6 UCF xy$ | 8 | – | 0 | 13 | – | 0 |
| No. 21 South Florida | 6 | – | 2 | 10 | – | 2 |
| Temple | 4 | – | 4 | 7 | – | 6 |
| Cincinnati | 2 | – | 6 | 4 | – | 8 |
| UConn | 2 | – | 6 | 3 | – | 9 |
| East Carolina | 2 | – | 6 | 3 | – | 9 |
West Division
| No. 25 Memphis xy | 7 | – | 1 | 10 | – | 3 |
| Houston | 5 | – | 3 | 7 | – | 5 |
| Navy | 4 | – | 4 | 7 | – | 6 |
| SMU | 4 | – | 4 | 7 | – | 6 |
| Tulane | 3 | – | 5 | 5 | – | 7 |
| Tulsa | 1 | – | 7 | 2 | – | 10 |
Championship: UCF 62, Memphis 55
$ – Conference champion; x – Division champion/co-champions; y – Championship game participant; As of January 9, 2018; Rankings from AP Poll.

The 2017 Cincinnati Bearcats football team represented the University of Cincinnati in the 2017 NCAA Division I FBS football season. The Bearcats were led by first-year head coach Luke Fickell who was hired in December 2016. The Bearcats played their home games at Nippert Stadium, and were members of the East Division in the American Athletic Conference. They finished the season 4–8, 2–6 in AAC play to finish in a three-way tie for fourth place in the East Division.

== Schedule ==
The Bearcats' 2017 schedule consisted of six home games and six away games. Cincinnati hosted two of its four non-conference games; against Austin Peay from the Ohio Valley Conference, and Marshall from Conference USA. They traveled to Michigan for the first ever meeting between the Bearcats and Wolverines and long time rival Miami (OH) for their annual Victory Bell game.

The Bearcats played eight conference games; hosting UCF, UConn, Temple and SMU. They traveled to East Carolina, Navy, South Florida and Tulane. On September 14, 2017, the American Athletic Conference announced that Cincinnati will play at USF on Saturday, October 14 and will have its bye week on October 28 due to the aftermath of Hurricane Irma.

| Date | Time | Opponent | Site | TV | Result | Attendance |
|---|---|---|---|---|---|---|
| August 31 | 7:00 p.m. | Austin Peay* | Nippert Stadium; Cincinnati, OH | ESPN3 | W 26–14 | 30,831 |
| September 9 | 12:00 p.m. | at No. 8 Michigan* | Michigan Stadium; Ann Arbor, MI | ABC | L 14–36 | 111,384 |
| September 16 | 8:00 p.m. | at Miami (OH)* | Yager Stadium; Oxford, OH (Victory Bell) | FOX 19 | W 21–17 | 21,811 |
| September 23 | 3:30 p.m. | at Navy | Navy–Marine Corps Memorial Stadium; Annapolis, MD | CBSSN | L 32–42 | 33,134 |
| September 30 | 7:00 p.m. | Marshall* | Nippert Stadium; Cincinnati, OH | ESPN3 | L 21–38 | 35,736 |
| October 7 | 8:00 p.m. | No. 25 UCF | Nippert Stadium; Cincinnati, OH (rivalry) | ESPNU | L 23–51 (Note: The UCF game was delayed for lightning with four seconds left in the third quarter. After the delay lasted over an hour, the American Athletic Conference cancelled the rest of the game.) | 27,253 |
| October 14 | 7:30 p.m. | at No. 18 South Florida | Raymond James Stadium; Tampa, FL | ESPNU | L 3–33 | 43,708 |
| October 21 | 4:00 p.m. | SMU^{†} | Nippert Stadium; Cincinnati, OH | ESPNU | L 28–31 ^{OT} | 30,885 |
| November 4 | 4:00 p.m. | at Tulane | Yulman Stadium; New Orleans, LA | ESPN3 | W 17–16 | 20,798 |
| November 10 | 7:00 p.m. | Temple | Nippert Stadium; Cincinnati, OH | ESPN2 | L 24–35 | 22,773 |
| November 18 | 12:00 p.m. | at East Carolina | Dowdy–Ficklen Stadium; Greenville, NC | CBSSN | L 20–48 | 31,923 |
| November 25 | 12:00 p.m. | UConn | Nippert Stadium; Cincinnati, OH | ESPNews | W 22–21 | 23,125 |
*Non-conference game; ^{†}Homecoming; Rankings from AP Poll released prior to the game; All times are in Eastern time

== Game summaries ==
=== Austin Peay ===
| | 1 | 2 | 3 | 4 | Total |
|---|---|---|---|---|---|
| Governors | 0 | 7 | 0 | 7 | 14 |
| Bearcats | 0 | 14 | 6 | 6 | 26 |

The Bearcats started the Luke Fickell era by hosting FCS opponent Austin Peay at Nippert Stadium. The Governors were making their 6th visit to Cincinnati, their last visit was a 72–10 throttling in 2011. Many figured that the Governors would be a good warmup having lost 27 straight and 44 of their last 45. The Bearcats struggled at times missed field goals and were far from dominant. The Bearcats were held scoreless in the first quarter but put a decent drive together in the 2nd and scored the first touchdown on the season on a 16-yard pass from Hayden Moore to Thomas Geddis, the Governors responded surprisingly quickly driving 81 yards in 10 plays and leveling the game on a 19-yard touchdown pass from JaVaughn Craig to Kente Williams. The Bearcats took the lead just before halftime on Moore's 2nd touchdown pass this one to Khalil Lewis. The game turned into a grinder with both teams struggling to move the ball. The Bearcats increased their lead on Moore's 3rd touchdown pass of the game. This connection with Tyler Cogswell. Andrew Gantz missed the extra point which kept the lead at 20–7 going into the 4th quarter. The Governors put together another long drive and capitalized with an 11-yard run by Josh Alexander to cut the Bearcat lead to 20–14. Mike Boone added a touchdown in the 4th and though Gantz missed another extra point, the Bearcats looked to have finally put Austin Peay away. But the Governors drove deep into Bearcat territory but that drive was thwarted when redshirt freshman Joel Dublanko stopped Williams on 4th and 1 to seal the win. The win wasn't pretty, the Governors outgained the Bearcats and dominated the time of possession. But the Bearcats forced two turnovers to thwart drives and didn't turn the ball over themselves. Senior RB Mike Boone rushed for 100 yards on 19 carries, the first Bearcat to crack the century mark since Boone did so against Tulsa in November 2015

=== at Michigan ===
| | 1 | 2 | 3 | 4 | Total |
|---|---|---|---|---|---|
| Bearcats | 7 | 0 | 7 | 0 | 14 |
| No. 8 Wolverines | 14 | 3 | 7 | 12 | 36 |

After a struggle to put away a lowly FCS team, few gave the Bearcats any chance of victory as they made their first ever trip to Ann Arbor to face the University of Michigan. Over 111,000 the largest crowd ever to see a Cincinnati team piled into Michigan Stadium for the contest. The 8th ranked Wolverines took the opening kickoff and effortlessly went 80 yards in 7 plays, the capper a 43 touchdown pass from Wilton Speight to Keoka Crawford. The Bearcats did themselves no favors as Tyree Kinnel picked off an errant Hayden Moore pass and cruised 28 yards to the end zone. Just like that it was 14–0 mid first quarter and a national TV audience braced for a rout. But the Bearcats hung tough and cut the Wolverine lead in half when Mike Boone crashed in from a yard out. The Bearcats didn't allow another touchdown in the first half, but Michigan increased its lead to 17–7 at the half on a short field goal early in the 2nd quarter. The Bearcats were able to force turnovers but were unable to put points up from them. Further hampering the Bearcats they failed to cash in on their last possession of the half as a 51-yard field goal at the halftime gun was short. Taking the second half kickoff, the Bearcats put together its most impressive drive of the afternoon. A 10-play, 85-yard drive was capped by a 10-yard connection from Hayden Moore to Khalil Lewis and the Bearcats were within 3 at 17–14. A majority of the 111,383 at the Big House were growing increasingly annoyed that the double digit underdog Bearcats were still in the game. The Wolverines pushed the lead back to 10 late in the quarter with another touchdown pass from Speight to Grant Perry. The 4th quarter was simply put, a disaster. The Wolverines increased their lead to 27–14 on a short field goal then when the Bearcats were set to punt on their next possession, the snap sailed over punter James Smith's head towards the end zone. Smith batted the ball out of the end zone for a safety. Moore was picked off a second time late in the quarter and the result was another pick six. The Michigan defense outscored the Bearcats 16–14 en route to a 36–14 final. Though the Bearcats were dominated yardage wise, they stayed in the game much longer than expected. The Bearcats only managed 211 yards offense on the day and fell to 1–1.

=== at Miami (OH) ===
| | 1 | 2 | 3 | 4 | Total |
|---|---|---|---|---|---|
| Bearcats | 3 | 0 | 0 | 18 | 21 |
| RedHawks | 7 | 0 | 7 | 3 | 17 |

The Redhawks were utterly confident that this would be the year that they would regain the Victory Bell after 11 seasons. They had endured heartbreaking losses, 2 shutouts and a number of hopeless games that they were never in. The oddsmakers installed them as 7 point favorites and the Miami Athletic department greased the goalposts in Yager Stadium in anticipation of the Miami fans wanting to tear the goalposts down after beating the Bearcats. The Redhawks looked like a sure thing, controlling both sides of the ball and led the game 17–6 with 4:45 left to play after Sam Sloman's 37-yard field goal. The Bearcats scored their first offensive touchdown on a 20-yard pass from Hayden Moore to Khalil Lewis with 2:52 left, but the Redhawks had the ball and the lead. Needing to just run out the clock as the Bearcats were out of timeouts, Miami gambled on a 3rd down pass inside its 25. The gamble backfired spectacularly as Malik Clements picked off Gus Ragland's pass and raced 14 yards to the end zone to give the Bearcats the 21–17 lead with just 67 seconds on the clock. The Miami fans could only watch in horror as the Bearcats would keep the Victory Bell ringing in Red and Black with a 21–17 win. Moore threw for 222 yards and a score while redshirt freshman Gerrid Doaks gained 71 yards on 11 carries in place of an injured Mike Boone. True Freshman Michael Warren added 51 yards in his first extensive playing time as a Bearcat. The win extended the Bearcats win streak in the Victory Bell series to 12 and narrowed the series to 59–56–7. "It's in the back of your head that you don't want to be that team to let the bell go," Moore said. "That gives us even more motivation to be able to take it back home. I know how important it is to all the people at UC and all the fans and all the alumni." Even Fickell rang the bell in celebration, something he had resisted doing all week. "I told them I can't touch that Victory Bell because I didn't earn it," Fickell said. "I didn't touch that Victory Bell until that game was over because I didn't think it was right."

=== at Navy ===
| | 1 | 2 | 3 | 4 | Total |
|---|---|---|---|---|---|
| Bearcats | 7 | 10 | 7 | 8 | 32 |
| Midshipmen | 14 | 7 | 14 | 7 | 42 |

After a rousing win against their neighborhood rival, the Bearcats started AAC play with a trip to Annapolis to face the US Naval Academy, this marked the Bearcats first visit to Annapolis since 1956 and their 3rd all time meeting with the Midshipmen. The Navy's triple option offense presented a unique challenge to the Bearcats and it showed early as the Midshipmen repeatedly gashed the Bearcat defense on punishing runs. The Bearcats tried to match score for score but Navy ran its offense to near perfection and the Bearcats seemed helpless to stop it. Time and again, the Bearcats would guess wrong on which Midshipmen player had the ball on the option and Navy repeatedly gained positive yardage on each play. The 569 rushing yards set a record for most yards allowed rushing breaking the previous mark set by Northern Illinois in 1989. Meanwhile, the Bearcats only gained a puny 53 yards rushing. Hayden Moore threw for 381 and 3 scores in a valiant but seemingly futile effort. Navy's running game was the story and the Bearcats inability to stop it was the main reason that the Bearcats were on the wrong end of a 42–32 loss. The Bearcats dropped their conference opener and fell to 2–3 on the season

=== Marshall ===
| | 1 | 2 | 3 | 4 | Total |
|---|---|---|---|---|---|
| Thundering Herd | 7 | 17 | 7 | 7 | 38 |
| Bearcats | 0 | 0 | 7 | 14 | 21 |

After the dispiriting loss to Navy, the Bearcats returned home to the friendly confines of Nippert Stadium and matchup with Marshall. The Bearcats were expected to handle the Thundering Herd but got a rude awakening as Marshall roared out to a 24–0 halftime lead. The Bearcats were booed off the field by a majority of the 35,763 in attendance. The Bearcats played better in the 2nd half, scoring 21 points but that was cold comfort as Marshall was never threatened in a 38–21 decision. Though the yardage looked even at 366–349 in favor of the Thundering Herd most of the Bearcat yardage was gained in late garbage time with the game no longer in doubt. Hayden Moore threw for 211 yards and a score, but Marshall held the ball for nearly 40 minutes in dominating the game. The loss was the Bearcats second straight and dropped them to 2–4 overall.

=== UCF ===
| | 1 | 2 | 3 | 4 | Total |
|---|---|---|---|---|---|
| No. 25 Knights | 20 | 17 | 14 | 0 | 51 |
| Bearcats | 7 | 9 | 7 | 0 | 23 |

The Knights came to Nippert Stadium eager to avenge their last visit a 52–7 drubbing in 2015 during an 0–12 season. 1:13 into the game Knight QB McKenzie Milton hit Dredrick Snelson on a 54-yard score. After a UC punt, Milton unleashed a 79-yard bomb to Tre'Quan Smith and the rout was on. The Knights moved the ball at will and the Bearcat defense seemed helpless to stop the onslaught. It seemed the only thing that could stop the Knights was rain. Lightning stopped the contest with 4 seconds to play in the 3rd quarter. A deluge of rain followed which delayed proceedings any further and the AAC called the contest after an hour delay with no letup of rain in sight. The final was 51–23 Knights rang up 515 yards in 3 quarters. Smith scored 3 times for the Knights (2 Rec, 1 run) Milton threw for 5 scores as the Bearcats gave up their highest point total since a 65–27 drubbing in Tampa by South Florida in 2015. The loss dropped the Bearcats to 2–4 and winless in conference play.

=== at South Florida ===
| | 1 | 2 | 3 | 4 | Total |
|---|---|---|---|---|---|
| Bearcats | 3 | 0 | 0 | 0 | 3 |
| No. 18 Bulls | 3 | 20 | 7 | 3 | 33 |

After the washout loss to UCF, the Bearcats faced the unenviable task of heading to Tampa to face the 18th ranked Bulls. Raymond James Stadium has recently been a house of horrors for the Bearcats as they gave up 65 points in their last visit. This visit wasn't as high scoring but it was just as much a battering. The Bulls dominated the Bearcats to a 33–3 thrashing. After the Bearcats evened the score on a 30-yard field goal in the 1st quarter by Ryan Jones, the Bills tacked on a pair of field goals to up their lead to 9–3, then Darius Tice found the end zone on a 16-yard run to increase the Bulls lead to 16–3. Looking to take this manageable deficit to the half the Bearcats had the ball near midfield. The Bulls were called for a defensive penalty with no time left in the first half, and the Bearcats were granted one untimed down. Disaster struck when Moore's pass was picked off and returned 65 yards for a touchdown by Auggie Sanchez. The pick six seemed to deflate the Bearcats further and they limped through a lethargic second half which Bulls continue to pull away, in all USF scored 30 unanswered points to win handily. The loss dropped the Bearcats to 2–5 and winless in conference play.

=== SMU ===
| | 1 | 2 | 3 | 4 | OT | Total |
|---|---|---|---|---|---|---|
| Mustangs | 14 | 7 | 0 | 7 | 3 | 31 |
| Bearcats | 10 | 10 | 0 | 8 | 0 | 28 |

After the blowout loss to USF, the Bearcats returned to Nippert Stadium for Homecoming to face SMU. Though the Mustangs were 4–2 they had yet to ever defeat the Bearcats in 3 previous meetings and the Bearcats were riding a homecoming win streak dating back to 2011. The game started with promise as Hayden Moore gave the Bearcats their first first possession score of the season with a 3-yard scramble for a score. It was also the first time the Bearcats had led at any point since the Miami game nearly a month previous. SMU tied the game in on a 3-yard Xavier Jones run and after the Bearcats took the lead on a Ryan Jones field goal retook the lead on a Ke’Mon Williams 2-yard run. A crowd of 30,085 was then treated to a thrilling back and forth affair, as both teams traded scores and the lead in the 2nd quarter. There was no scoring in the 3rd and the Mustangs held a slim 21–20 advantage, a lead that was increased to 8 on a 25-yard scoring toss from Ben Hicks to Courtland Sutton. The Bearcats gamely fought back and tied the game on Hayden Moore to Devin Gray touchdown pass covering 21 yards. Gray caught a two-point conversion pass to tie the game with 2:22 left. The Bearcats forced the Mustangs to go three and out but the Bearcats stunned their home crowd by running out the clock in regulation on two short running plays. The two teams headed to overtime tied at 28. The Mustangs got first possession and seemingly did everything it could to give the game away, the Mustangs fumbled a pitchout, but the Bearcats could not recover, the Mustangs were facing a 4th & 26 and had Hicks scrambling from heavy pressure only to see Hicks fire a pass to Trey Quinn that picked up 28 yards. The Bearcats had the most trouble stopping Quinn who caught 17 passes for 186 yards. Josh Williams of SMU kicked a 27-yard field goal and the Mustangs held a 31–28 advantage. On their possession The Bearcats gained 6 yards on their first two plays and faced a 3rd and 4 from the Mustang 19. SMU brought a heavy blitz and was trying to bring Hayden Moore down, in a panic Moore tried shoveling the ball to Mike Boone. It was a fatal error as Mustang linebacker Kyran Mitchell stepped in front of Boone to pick off the pass and end the game. It was a crushing homecoming defeat for the Bearcats, their 8th straight conference loss and a year to day since they notched a win in conference. The loss dropped the Bearcats to 2–6 and 0–4 in AAC play, all but killing any chance at a bowl bid.

=== at Tulane ===
| | 1 | 2 | 3 | 4 | Total |
|---|---|---|---|---|---|
| Bearcats | 3 | 7 | 7 | 0 | 17 |
| Green Wave | 7 | 6 | 0 | 3 | 16 |

It looked like the same old sad story, after having to stew on their crushing homecoming loss to SMU for an extra week from a bye, the Bearcats traveled to New Orleans to take on Tulane. The Bearcats and Green Wave traded scored in an otherwise ragged matchup of AAC bottom feeder. The Bearcats trailed 13–10 at the half but took the lead in the 3rd quarter on 5-yard run by Mike Boone. The Green Wave closed the gap to 17–16 and when the Bearcats pinned them to inside the 20 reeled off a methodical drive that went from the Green Wave 15 to the Bearcats 14 with under 90 seconds to play. But instead of bad luck befalling the Bearcats again, the misfortune this time found Tulane. The Green Wave were called for a false start as they tried to get the Bearcats to jump offsides on a 4th and 1, then Green Wave kicker Merek Glover badly missed a makeable 36-yard field goal short and wide that would have given the Green Wave the lead. The Bearcats iced the game on the subsequent possession as Gerrid Doaks broke off a 54-yard run. The win broke the Bearcats eight game losing streak in conference play, improved their record to 3–6 and also ruined Tulane's homecoming. Hayden Moore notched one of his best games going 18 of 27 for 246 yards and one touchdown. Moore was not sacked nor threw any interceptions on the afternoon. Doaks had a career high 149 yards on 17 carries.

=== Temple ===
| | 1 | 2 | 3 | 4 | Total |
|---|---|---|---|---|---|
| Owls | 3 | 10 | 15 | 7 | 35 |
| Bearcats | 0 | 0 | 14 | 10 | 24 |

Looking to build off the win against Tulane, the Bearcats returned home eager to snap their home losing streak as they faced the Temple Owls. The game did not start well as the Bearcats could not generate any offense meanwhile Temple methodically put points on the board, first by a pair of Aaron Boumerhi field goals then a short scoring run by David Hood. The Owls took a 13–0 lead into the half. The Bearcats offense finally showed some life, taking the second half kickoff and putting together a solid drive. Hayden Moore connecting with Thomas Geddis on a 29 score to cut the Temple lead to 6. Temple responded with a 9-play, 68-yard drive to increase their lead back to 13 at 20–7. The Bearcats answered that score with a 7 play 71 scoring drive of their own capped off by a nifty 21 yard scoring run by Mike Boone. The Bearcat faithful clung to some hope of victory as the deficit was again cut to 6 at 20–14. Those hopes were cruelly dashed on the ensuing kickoff. Isaiah Wright took the kickoff at the 2 and raced back 98 yards for a backbreaking touchdown. The Owls added insult to injury by converting on the 2 point conversion to increase their lead to 14. Despite the Bearcats scoring 10 in the final period those scores were sandwiched around a Frank Nutile scoring run which made the final score 35–24.

=== at East Carolina ===
| | 1 | 2 | 3 | 4 | Total |
|---|---|---|---|---|---|
| Bearcats | 0 | 13 | 7 | 0 | 20 |
| Pirates | 14 | 10 | 14 | 10 | 48 |

In their final road trip of the 2017 season, the Bearcats traveled to Dowdy-Ficklen Stadium in Greenville, NC to take on the East Carolina Pirates. As has been their wont all season, the Bearcats fell behind early and struggled to keep up as Pirate QB Gardner Minshew threw for 444 yards and 4 touchdowns on 31 of 45 passing. 270 of those yards were to Trevon Brown who set a single game school record. Meanwhile, Hayden Moore completed 15 of 28 passes for 187 yards and 3 scores, he completed passes to 10 different receivers, while Mike Boone paced the Bearcats with 62 yards rushing. The Bearcats spotted the Pirates a 21–0 lead before getting back within a score at 21–13 only to have the Pirates rip off 17 more points to bolster their lead. Included in this scoring barrage was a 95-yard pass from Minshew to Brown. The loss dropped the Bearcats to 3–8 overall and 1–6 in the AAC

=== UConn ===
| | 1 | 2 | 3 | 4 | Total |
|---|---|---|---|---|---|
| Huskies | 3 | 3 | 9 | 6 | 21 |
| Bearcats | 0 | 7 | 0 | 15 | 22 |

The Bearcats battled the Huskies on a cold but sunny Saturday at Nippert Stadium. During the first half, the Bearcats managed to take a 7–6 lead on Hayden Moore to Khalil Lewis touchdown pass. But the Bearcats failed to score in the 3rd as the Huskies scored on a touchdown and a field goal to take a 15–7 lead into the 4th. Moore and Lewis hooked up on a 2nd touchdown, Mike Boone scored the two point conversion and the game was tied. Moore scored late in the 4th on a 4-yard scramble and the Bearcats had the lead. The Huskies had one more drive and raced 93 yards on 12 plays capped off by a 2-yard pass from David Pindell to Hergy Mayala. Mayala was flagged for taunting which moved the extra point try back 15 yards. The kick was pushed wide left by Huskies kicker Michael Tarbutt and the Bearcats had an improbable happy ending to their 2017 season with a 22–21 win. The Bearcats finished the 2017 season, Fickell's first as Bearcats head coach at 4–8, the same as the previous season.

== Personnel ==
=== Roster and staff ===
2017 Cincinnati Bearcats football team roster
Players
Coaches
Offense

| Pos. | # | Name | Class |
|---|---|---|---|
| WR | 1 | Kahlil Lewis | Jr |
| RB | 3 | Michael Warren II | Fr |
| RB | 5 | Mike Boone | Sr |
| WR | 6 | Tshumbi Johnson | Sr |
| WR | 7 | Javan Hawes | Fr |
| QB | 8 | Hayden Moore | Jr |
| QB | 9 | Desmond Ridder | Fr |
| QB | 10 | Jake Sopko | Fr |
| QB | 12 | Ross Trail | So |
| TE | 18 | Tyler Cogswell | Sr |
| WR | 19 | Tyrin Summers | Fr |
| WR | 21 | Devin Gray | Sr |
| RB | 22 | Jaelen Greene | Fr |
| RB | 23 | Gerrid Doaks | Fr |
| WR | 25 | Casey Kirk | Fr |
| WR | 26 | Jerron Rollins | So |
| WR | 27 | Hunter Gillespie | So |
| WR | 29 | Cameron Naber | Fr |
| RB | 30 | Michael Kopaygorodsky | Fr |
| RB | 34 | Joshuwa Holloman | So |
| RB | 35 | Taylor Boose | So |
| WR | 35 | Trent Cloud | Fr |
| OL | 52 | Reed Armagost | So |
| OL | 53 | Tyler McGarr | So |
| OL | 54 | Keith Minor | Jr |
| OL | 55 | Alex Heil | So |
| OL | 56 | Kyle Trout | Jr |
| OL | 60 | Zach Bycznski | Fr |
| OL | 61 | Mason Garrison | So |
| OL | 64 | Will Steur | Sr |
| OL | 66 | David Niehaus | Sr |
| OL | 68 | Doug Bates | Fr |
| OL | 70 | Jakari Robinson | Fr |
| OL | 71 | Korey Cunningham | Sr |
| OL | 72 | Garrett Campbell | Sr |
| OL | 72 | Blake Yager | So |
| OL | 74 | Kendall Calhoun | Sr |
| OL | 76 | Evan Mallory | So |
| OT | 77 | Vincent McConnell | Fr |
| OL | 78 | Morgan James | Jr |
| OL | 79 | Drew Hartmann | Fr |
| WR | 80 | Malick Mbodj | Fr |
| WR | 81 | Garrett Weaver | Jr |
| TE | 82 | Wilson Huber | Fr |
| TE | 83 | Josiah Deguara | So |
| WR | 85 | Thomas Geddis | So |
| WR | 86 | Rashad Medaris | So |
| TE | 87 | Bruno Labelle | Fr |
| WR | 88 | Braxton Neal | So |
| TE | 89 | Jake Elfers | Jr |

Defense

| Pos. | # | Name | Class |
|---|---|---|---|
| S | 2 | Tyrell Gilbert | Jr |
| CB | 3 | Christian Angulo | So |
| LB | 6 | Perry Young | So |
| LB | 8 | Jarell White | Fr |
| CB | 9 | Linden Stephens | Jr |
| CB | 13 | Grant Coleman | Sr |
| CB | 15 | Rashaad Stewart | Fr |
| S | 16 | Darrick Forrest | Fr |
| LB | 17 | R. J. Potts | Fr |
| S | 17 | Collin Widecan | So |
| CB | 18 | Josiah Robey | Fr |
| S | 19 | Davin Pierce | Sr |
| S | 20 | Carter Jacobs | Sr |
| DB | 20 | Ethan Tucky | Fr |
| DB | 21 | Marquese Gray | Fr |
| S | 24 | Malik Clements | Jr |
| CB | 24 | Noah Hamlin | Fr |
| S | 25 | Coby Bryant | Fr |
| CB | 30 | Chris Murphy | Jr |
| CB | 31 | Marquis Smith | Fr |
| DB | 32 | James Wiggins | Fr |
| LB | 33 | Jaylyin Minor | Sr |
| LB | 34 | Kyle Bolden | Fr |
| S | 36 | Sheldon Doss | So |
| LB | 40 | Ty Sponseller | Fr |
| LB | 41 | Joel Dublanko | Fr |
| DE | 42 | Devin Williams | Fr |
| DE | 43 | Michael Pitts | Fr |
| DE | 44 | Marquise Copeland | Jr |
| LB | 45 | DeMarko Baker | Fr |
| DE | 47 | Landon Brazile | Jr |
| LB | 48 | Kevin Mouhon | Jr |
| OLB | 49 | Tyquan Statham | Fr |
| DE | 51 | Kimoni Fitz | Jr |
| DE | 55 | Caleb Ashworth | So |
| DE | 56 | Mark Wilson | Sr |
| DE | 86 | Angelo Howze | Fr |
| DE | 89 | Nick Staderman | Fr |
| DE | 92 | Curtis Brooks | Fr |
| DE | 93 | Elijah Ponder | Fr |
| DE | 94 | Joe Schroer | Fr |
| DE | 95 | Bryan Wright | So |
| DT | 96 | Cortez Broughton | Jr |
| DT | 97 | Norman Oglesby | So |
| DT | 98 | Lyndon Johnson | Sr |
| DT | 99 | Marcus Brown | Fr |

Special teams

| Pos. | # | Name | Class |
|---|---|---|---|
| K | 16 | Andrew Gantz | Sr |
| LS | 31 | Kyle Curtis | Sr |
| K | 34 | Josh Pasley | Sr |
| P | 37 | James Smith | Fr |
| LS | 57 | Cody Armstrong | Fr |
| K | 58 | Garrett Rigby | Fr |
| K | 69 | Zach Wood | Fr |
| K | 97 | Ryan Jones | So |
| K | 98 | Cole Smith | Fr |

Head coach

- Luke Fickell (Ohio State) – 1st year

Coordinators/assistant coaches

- Mike Denbrock (Grand Valley State)
  1st year – (Offensive Coordinator/ Quarterbacks)
- Marcus Freeman (Ohio State)
  1st year – (Defensive Coordinator/ Linebackers)
- Doug Phillips (Toledo)
  1st year – (Special Teams Coordinator/Tight Ends)
- Ron Crook (West Liberty State)
  1st year – (Offensive Line)
- Gino Guidugli (Cincinnati)
  1st year – (Running Backs)
- Willie Martinez (Miami (FL))
  1st year – (Cornerbacks)
- Joker Phillips (Kentucky)
  1st year (3rd overall) – (Wide Receivers)
- Jon Tenuta (Virginia)
  1st year – (Safeties)
- Al Washington (Boston College)
  1st year – (Defensive Line)

Legend

- (C) Team captain
- (S) Suspended
- (I) Ineligible
- Injured
- Redshirt

Roster

=== Depth chart ===
Defense

FS
Carter Jacobs
Chris Murphy
⋅

| WLB | MLB | SLB |
|---|---|---|
| Perry Young | Jaylyin Minor | Tyrell Gilbert |
| ⋅ | Joel Dublanko | Ty Sponseller or Jarell White |
| ⋅ | ⋅ | ⋅ |

SS
Malik Clements
Sheldon Doss
⋅

CB
Linden Stephens
Marquis Smith
⋅

| DE | DT | DT | DE |
|---|---|---|---|
| Kevin Mouhon | Marquise Copeland | Cortez Broughton | Bryan Wright or Mark Wilson |
| Kimoni Fitz or Lyndon Johnson | Curtis Brooks | Norman Oglesby | ⋅ |
| ⋅ | ⋅ | ⋅ | ⋅ |

CB
Grant Coleman
Davin Pierce
⋅

Offense

WR
Devin Gray
Jerron Rollins
⋅

WR
Kahlil Lewis
Rashad Medaris
⋅

| LT | LG | C | RG | RT |
|---|---|---|---|---|
| Korey Cunningham | Keith Minor | David Niehaus or Garrett Campbell | Will Steur | Kendall Calhoun |
| Kyle Trout | Zach Bycznski | ⋅ | Morgan James | Blake Yager |
| ⋅ | ⋅ | ⋅ | ⋅ | ⋅ |

TE
Tyler Cogswell
Josiah Deguara
⋅

WR
Thomas Geddis
JJ Pinckney
⋅

QB
Hayden Moore
Ross Trail
Jake Sopko

RB
Mike Boone
Gerrid Doaks
Michael Warren II

== Awards and milestones ==
Weekly Awards
| Player | Award | Date Awarded | Ref. |
|---|---|---|---|
| Malik Clements | Co-Defensive Player of the Week | September 16, 2017 | |

All-AAC
| Player | Position | Team |
|---|---|---|
| James Smith | P | 1 |
| Korey Cunningham | OT | 2 |
| Jaylyin Minor | LB | 2 |
| Marquise Copeland | DT | HM |

== 2018 NFL draft ==
| Rnd. | Pick No. | NFL team | Player | Pos. | College | Conf. | Notes |
|---|---|---|---|---|---|---|---|
| 7* | 254 | Arizona Cardinals | Korey Cunningham | OT | Cincinnati | The American | |
