= Scottie Montgomery =

American football player and coach (born 1978)

Detroit Lions
- Title: Associate head coach and wide receivers coach

Personal information
- Born: May 26, 1978 (age 48); Shelby, North Carolina, U.S.
- Listed height: 6 ft 1 in (1.85 m)
- Listed weight: 195 lb (88 kg)

Career information
- Position: Wide receiver (No. 81, 83)
- High school: Burns (NC)
- College: Duke (1996–1999)
- NFL draft: 2000: undrafted

Career history

Playing
- Carolina Panthers (2000)*; Denver Broncos (2000–2002); Oakland Raiders (2003); Georgia Force (2005)
- * Offseason or practice squad member only

Coaching
- Duke (2006–2009) Wide receivers coach; Pittsburgh Steelers (2010–2012) Wide receivers coach; Duke (2013) Associate head coach, offensive coordinator, passing game coordinator & wide receivers coach; Duke (2014–2015) Associate head coach, offensive coordinator & quarterbacks coach; East Carolina (2016–2018) Head coach; Maryland (2019–2020) Offensive coordinator & quarterbacks coach; Indianapolis Colts (2021–2022) Running backs coach; Detroit Lions (2023–2024) Assistant head coach & running backs coach; Detroit Lions (2025–present) Associate head coach & wide receivers coach

Awards and highlights
- 2× Second-team All-ACC (1997, 1999)

Career NFL statistics
- Receptions: 16
- Receiving yards: 160
- Rushing yards: 32
- Return yards: 370
- Total touchdowns: 1
- Stats at Pro Football Reference

Career AFL statistics
- Receptions: 11
- Receiving yards: 117
- Total touchdowns: 1
- Stats at ArenaFan.com

Head coaching record
- Career: NCAA: 9–26 (.257)

Scottie Austin Montgomery (born May 26, 1978) is an American football coach who is the assistant head coach and wide receivers coach for the Detroit Lions of the National Football League (NFL). Prior to that he was the running back coach & assistant head coach for the Detroit Lions. Before the Lions, he was the Running Back coach for the Indianapolis Colts. Prior to that he was the offensive coordinator at the University of Maryland. Prior to his tenure with Maryland, he was the head football coach at East Carolina University. He had previously served as an assistant at Duke University and for the Pittsburgh Steelers of the National Football League (NFL). Montgomery grew up in North Carolina and played wide receiver at Duke and in the NFL.

== Early life ==
Montgomery attended Burns High School in Lawndale, North Carolina and was a standout in football, basketball, and track. In football, he was a two-time team MVP, and as a junior, helped lead his team to the State 3A title. In basketball, he won an All-Conference honors and was named the Team MVP. In track, he won All-Conference honors and was the conference champion on the 200 and the 400-meter dashes.

== College playing career ==
Montgomery attended Duke University from 1996 to 1999, finishing his career with 171 receptions (ranking second in Duke's history) for 2,379 yards (third), four 100-yard receiving games (seventh), and 13 touchdowns (eighth). He earned the team's MVP award in 1998 and 1999, becoming just one of five two-time team MVPs in Duke history. Montgomery joins Clarkston Hines as the only Duke players to have three straight seasons with more than 50 receptions and 600 yards.

== Professional playing career ==
Pre-draft measurables
| Height | Weight | Arm length | Hand span | 40-yard dash | 10-yard split | 20-yard split | 20-yard shuttle | Three-cone drill | Vertical jump | Broad jump |
|---|---|---|---|---|---|---|---|---|---|---|
| 6 ft 0 3/8 in (1.84 m) | 196 lb (89 kg) | 31 in (0.79 m) | 10 in (0.25 m) | 4.57 s | 1.59 s | 2.67 s | 4.11 s | 7.16 s | 36.0 in (0.91 m) | 9 ft 9 in (2.97 m) |
All values from NFL Combine

Montgomery entered the National Football League in 2000 as a rookie free agent with the Carolina Panthers. From there, he played for the Denver Broncos for three years (2000–2002) and the Oakland Raiders (2003). In 2005, he played for the Georgia Force in the Arena Football League.

== Coaching career ==
Montgomery began his coaching career at his alma mater, Duke University, where he served as the wide receivers coach for four seasons (2006–2009).

Montgomery was hired by the Pittsburgh Steelers on February 16, 2010, as the wide receivers coach, replacing Randy Fichtner, who moved to quarterback coach upon the retirement of Ken Anderson. He remained with the Steeler organization for three seasons. Notable players coached include Mike Wallace (Pro Bowl 2011), Hines Ward, Emmanuel Sanders, Antwaan Randle El, Antonio Brown (Pro Bowl 2011), and Jerricho Cotchery.

Montgomery returned to Duke as associate head coach and offensive coordinator/passing game while coaching the wide receivers, in 2013. Duke promoted him to offensive coordinator in 2014. Montgomery coached Jamison Crowder (2015, 4th round/#105, Washington Redskins) during 2013 and 2014 seasons.

East Carolina University named Montgomery its head coach on December 13, 2015, replacing Ruffin McNeill.

Montgomery was terminated before the 2018 season finale after posting a 9–26 record in three seasons.

It was announced that Montgomery would join Mike Locksley's staff as the offensive coordinator for the University of Maryland in 2019. He was later terminated after his second season with the Terrapins.

In February 2021, Montgomery was announced by the Indianapolis Colts as a running backs coach.

On February 6, 2023, Montgomery was announced by the Detroit Lions as their running backs coach.

On February 13, 2025, Montgomery was promoted to assistant head coach and wide receivers coach by the Detroit Lions

== Head coaching record ==
| Year | Team | Overall | Conference | Standing | Bowl/playoffs |
|---|---|---|---|---|---|
East Carolina (American Athletic Conference) (2016–2018)
| 2016 | East Carolina | 3–9 | 1–7 | T–4th (East) | |
| 2017 | East Carolina | 3–9 | 2–6 | T–4th (East) | |
| 2018 | East Carolina | 3–8 | 1–7 | 5th (East) | |
| East Carolina: | | 9–26 | 4–20 | | |
| Total: | | 9–26 | | | |
