= 2017 Houston Cougars football team =

American college football season

2017 Houston Cougars football

Hawaii Bowl, L 27–33 vs. Fresno State
- Conference: American Athletic Conference
- West Division
- Record: 7–5 (5–3 American)
- Head coach: Major Applewhite (1st season)
- Offensive coordinator: Brian Johnson (1st season)
- Offensive scheme: Spread
- Defensive coordinator: Mark D'Onofrio (1st season)
- Co-defensive coordinator: Clay Jennings (1st season)
- Base defense: 4–3
- Home stadium: TDECU Stadium

2017 American Athletic Conference football standings
	Conf.			Overall
Team	W		L	W		L
East Division
No. 6 UCF xy$	8	–	0	13	–	0
No. 21 South Florida	6	–	2	10	–	2
Temple	4	–	4	7	–	6
Cincinnati	2	–	6	4	–	8
UConn	2	–	6	3	–	9
East Carolina	2	–	6	3	–	9
West Division
No. 25 Memphis xy	7	–	1	10	–	3
Houston	5	–	3	7	–	5
Navy	4	–	4	7	–	6
SMU	4	–	4	7	–	6
Tulane	3	–	5	5	–	7
Tulsa	1	–	7	2	–	10
Championship: UCF 62, Memphis 55
$ – Conference champion; x – Division champion/co-champions; y – Championship game participant; As of January 9, 2018; Rankings from AP Poll.

The 2017 Houston Cougars football team represented the University of Houston in the 2017 NCAA Division I FBS football season. The Cougars played their home games at TDECU Stadium in Houston, Texas, and competed in the West Division of the American Athletic Conference. They were led by first-year head coach Major Applewhite. They finished the season 7–5, 5–3 in AAC play to finish in second place in the West Division. They were invited to the Hawaii Bowl where they lost to Fresno State.

== Roster ==
2017 Houston Cougars football team roster
Players
Coaches
Offense

Pos.	#	Name	Class
QB	1	Bryson Smith	Fr
RB	2	Duke Catalon	Jr
QB	3	Kyle Postma	Sr
QB	4	D'Eriq King	So
WR	5	Marquez Stevenson	So
WR	6	Jeremy Singleton	Fr
RB	8	Davion Mitchell	Fr
WR	9	Courtney Lark	So
QB	10	Kyle Allen	Jr
QB	13	Mason McClendon	Jr
WR	14	Cole McGowan	Fr
WR	15	Linell Bonner	Sr
WR	16	Joshua Hancock	Jr
WR	17	Terry Mark	So
WR	18	Keith Corbin	So
RB	20	Kaliq Kokuma	Jr
WR	21	Ellis Jefferson	Sr
RB	23	Chandler Smith	Fr
RB	25	Dillon Birden	Sr
RB	28	Josh Burrell	So
WR	30	Timon Nolan	Jr
RB	31	Blake Hirsch	Jr
RB	32	Kevrin Justice	So
WR	33	Kinte Hatton	Sr
RB	34	Mulbah Car	So
RB	35	Patrick Carr	So
WR	37	Payton Pardee	So
TE	40	Shane Creamer	Fr
OL	51	Na'Ty Rodgers	Sr
OL	52	Braylon Jones	So
OL	53	Alex Fontana	Sr
OL	56	Dixie Wooten III	Fr
OL	57	Jordan Boatman	Fr
OL	60	Kordell Snyder	Fr
OL	61	Ryan Deshotel	So
OL	62	Jarrid Williams	So
OL	63	Colson Altman	Fr
OL	64	Dennis Bardwell	Fr
OL	66	Cole Miller	Fr
OL	69	Will Noble	Jr
OL	71	Deon Mix	Sr
OL	72	Mason Denley	Jr
OL	73	Marcus Oliver	Sr
OL	74	Josh Jones	So
OL	76	Kameron Eloph	Jr
OL	77	Keenan Murphy	Fr
WR	80	Colton Cerday	So
WR	81	Tre'Von Bradley	Fr
TE	82	Romello Brooker	Jr
WR	83	Derek McLemore	Sr
TE	84	Kobe Idumwonyi	So
WR	85	John Leday	Sr
TE	86	Mason Tobola	Fr
TE	87	Alex Leslie	Sr
WR	88	Steven Dunbar	Sr
TE	89	Parker Eichenberger	Fr

Defense

Pos.	#	Name	Class
DB	1	Garrett Davis	Jr
DB	2	Khalil Williams	Sr
DL	3	Reggie Chevis	Sr
DB	4	Devodric Bynum	Fr
DB	5	Collin Wilder	So
DB	6	Khari Dotson	Jr
LB	8	Emeke Egbule	Jr
LB	9	Matthew Adams	Sr
DT	10	Ed Oliver	So
LB	12	D'Juan Hines	Sr
CB	13	Joeal Williams	Jr
CB	14	Isaiah Johnson	Jr
CB	16	Ka'Darian Smith	So
DE	17	Chauntez Jackson	Sr
CB	18	Alexander Myres	Sr
LB	19	Ralph Harvey Jr.	Sr
CB	19	Javian Smith	So
LB	20	Roman Brown	Jr
LB	22	Austin Robinson	Sr
DB	23	Terrell Williams	Sr
CB	24	Jeremy Winchester	Jr
LB	26	Elijah Gooden	Fr
DB	27	Brandon McDowell	Sr
LB	28	Amaud Willis-Dalton	Fr
DB	29	Darius Gilbert	So
DB	30	Grant Stuard	So
DB	31	D. J. Small	Fr
LB	33	Ja'Von Shelley	Jr
DB	34	King Ekejija	Fr
DB	35	Jayson Price	Jr
LB	36	Nomluis Fruge	Sr
DB	37	Caemen Mayfield	Jr
LB	41	Derek Parish	Fr
LB	43	Leroy Godfrey	So
LB	45	Cameron Doubenmier	Sr
LB	46	Jordan Milburn	So
LB	49	David Anenih	Fr
DT	50	Aymiel Fleming	So
LB	51	Rasheed Tynes	Sr
DE	52	Jerard Carter	Jr
DE	58	Nnanna Ejiogu	Jr
DL	75	Jacoby Morrison	So
DL	80	Noah Jones	Fr
DE	90	Zach Vaughan	Jr
DE	91	Nick Thurman	Sr
DL	93	Colby Brignac	Fr
DL	94	Isaiah Chambers	Fr
DL	95	Alexander Duke	Fr
DL	98	Payton Turner	So
DL	99	Blake Young	So

Special teams

Pos.	#	Name	Class
P	38	Dane Roy	So
K	41	Joel Scarbrough	So
K	42	Caden Novikoff	Jr
LS	44	Anthony Cantu	Jr
K	47	Dalton Witherspoon	So
LS	97	Nick Wildberger	So

Head coach

- Major Applewhite (Texas)

Coordinators/assistant coaches

- Kendal Briles (Houston)
  Offensive coordinator/quarterbacks
- Mark D'Onofrio (Penn State)
  Defensive coordinator
- James Casey (Rice)
  Special teams coordinator/tight ends
- Randy Clements (Stephen F. Austin)
  Run game coordinator/offensive line
- A. J. Blum (Ashland)
  Defensive line
- Dan Carrel (West Liberty)
  Outside linebackers
- Kenny Guiton (Ohio State)
  Wide receivers
- Lamar Morgan (Louisiana–Lafayette)
  Safeties
- Kenith Pope (Oklahoma)
  Running backs
- Thomas Dunson (LSU)
  Defensive football analyst
- Kyle Robinson (Alabama)
  Special teams football analyst
- Malcolm Kelly (Oklahoma)
  Offensive football analyst
- A. J. Hopp (Slippery Rock)
  Offensive football analyst
- J. B. Brown (Houston)
  Graduate assistant
- Robert Luce (Houston)
  Graduate assistant

Legend

- (C) Team captain
- (S) Suspended
- (I) Ineligible
- Injured
- Redshirt

Roster
Last update: May 13, 2020

== Schedule ==
Houston announced its 2017 football schedule on February 9, 2017. The 2017 schedule originally consisted of six home games and six road games in the regular season, but the road game versus UTSA was canceled. The Cougars hosted AAC foes East Carolina, Memphis, Navy, and SMU, and traveled to South Florida, Temple, Tulane, and Tulsa.

The Cougars hosted two of their three non-conference opponents, Rice from Conference USA (CUSA) and Texas Tech from the Big 12 Conference. They traveled to Arizona from the Pac-12 Conference. Houston was originally scheduled to travel to UTSA of CUSA but that game was canceled.

Date	Time	Opponent	Site	TV	Result	Attendance
September 2^{[a]}	6:00 p.m.	UTSA*	Alamodome; San Antonio, TX		canceled^{[a]}	
September 9	9:30 p.m.	at Arizona*	Arizona Stadium; Tucson, AZ	ESPNU	W 19–16	43,334
September 16	7:00 p.m.	Rice*	TDECU Stadium; Houston, TX (rivalry)	ESPN3	W 38–3	38,900
September 23	11:00 a.m.	Texas Tech*	TDECU Stadium; Houston, TX (rivalry)	ABC/ESPN2	L 24–27	36,383
September 30	11:00 a.m.	at Temple	Lincoln Financial Field; Philadelphia, PA	ESPNU	W 20–13	24,024
October 7	6:00 p.m.	SMU	TDECU Stadium; Houston, TX (rivalry)	CBSSN	W 35–22	31,153
October 14	2:45 p.m.	at Tulsa	H. A. Chapman Stadium; Tulsa, OK	ESPNews	L 17–45	19,198
October 19	7:00 p.m.	No. 25 Memphis	TDECU Stadium; Houston, TX	ESPN	L 38–42	30,001
October 28^{[b]}	2:45 p.m.	at No. 17 South Florida	Raymond James Stadium; Tampa, FL	ESPNU	W 28–24	32,316
November 4^{[b]}	11:00 a.m.	East Carolina^{†}	TDECU Stadium; Houston, TX	CBSSN	W 52–27	29,810
November 18	3:00 p.m.	at Tulane	Yulman Stadium; New Orleans, LA	ESPNews	L 17–20	19,026
November 24	11:00 a.m.	Navy	TDECU Stadium; Houston, TX	ESPN	W 24–14	29,252
December 24	7:30 p.m.	vs. Fresno State*	Aloha Stadium; Honolulu, HI (Hawaii Bowl)	ESPN	L 27–33	20,546
*Non-conference game; ^{†}Homecoming; Rankings from AP Poll released prior to game; All times are in Central time

^{^[a]}The game between Houston and UTSA originally scheduled for September 2 at the Alamodome in San Antonio was initially postponed due to the aftermath of Hurricane Harvey. However, on Wednesday, September 6, 2017, officials from the two schools agreed that the previously postponed game would not be made up during the season.
^{^[b]}As a result of Hurricane Irma, Houston played at USF on Saturday, October 28 (instead of November 4), and hosted ECU on Saturday, November 4 (instead of October 28).

Schedule source:

== Game summaries ==
=== At Arizona ===
	1	2	3	4	Total
Cougars	3	14	2	0	19
Wildcats	3	7	3	3	16

=== Rice ===
	1	2	3	4	Total
Owls	0	0	0	3	3
Cougars	17	21	0	0	38

=== Texas Tech ===
	1	2	3	4	Total
Red Raiders	6	7	7	7	27
Cougars	0	10	0	14	24

=== At Temple ===
	1	2	3	4	Total
Cougars	7	6	7	0	20
Owls	0	0	3	10	13

=== SMU ===
	1	2	3	4	Total
Mustangs	9	3	10	0	22
Cougars	7	14	7	7	35

=== At Tulsa ===
	1	2	3	4	Total
Cougars	3	7	0	7	17
Golden Hurricane	0	7	17	21	45

=== Memphis ===
	1	2	3	4	Total
#25 Tigers	0	0	21	21	42
Cougars	7	10	14	7	38

=== At South Florida ===
	1	2	3	4	Total
Cougars	0	0	14	14	28
#17 Bulls	0	7	7	10	24

=== East Carolina ===
	1	2	3	4	Total
Pirates	0	10	7	10	27
Cougars	21	7	17	7	52

=== At Tulane ===
	1	2	3	4	Total
Cougars	3	0	7	7	17
Green Wave	3	10	0	7	20

=== Navy ===
	1	2	3	4	Total
Midshipmen	0	14	0	0	14
Cougars	7	0	7	10	24

=== Vs. Fresno State (Hawaii Bowl) ===
	1	2	3	4	Total
Bulldogs	0	13	7	13	33
Cougars	7	3	10	7	27

== Players in the 2018 NFL draft ==
Player	Position	Round	Pick	NFL club
Matthew Adams	LB	7	221	Indianapolis Colts
