= 2017 East Carolina Pirates football team =

American college football season

2017 East Carolina Pirates football
- Conference: American Athletic Conference
- East Division
- Record: 3–9 (2–6 The American)
- Head coach: Scottie Montgomery (2nd season)
- Offensive coordinator: Tony Petersen (2nd season)
- Offensive scheme: Multiple
- Defensive coordinator: Kenwick Thompson (2nd season)
- Base defense: 3–4
- Home stadium: Dowdy–Ficklen Stadium

2017 American Athletic Conference football standings
	Conf.			Overall
Team	W		L	W		L
East Division
No. 6 UCF xy$	8	–	0	13	–	0
No. 21 South Florida	6	–	2	10	–	2
Temple	4	–	4	7	–	6
Cincinnati	2	–	6	4	–	8
UConn	2	–	6	3	–	9
East Carolina	2	–	6	3	–	9
West Division
No. 25 Memphis xy	7	–	1	10	–	3
Houston	5	–	3	7	–	5
Navy	4	–	4	7	–	6
SMU	4	–	4	7	–	6
Tulane	3	–	5	5	–	7
Tulsa	1	–	7	2	–	10
Championship: UCF 62, Memphis 55
$ – Conference champion; x – Division champion/co-champions; y – Championship game participant; As of January 9, 2018; Rankings from AP Poll.

The 2017 East Carolina Pirates football team represented East Carolina University in the 2017 NCAA Division I FBS football season. They were led by second-year head coach Scottie Montgomery and played their home games at Dowdy–Ficklen Stadium. The Pirates competed as members of the East Division of the American Athletic Conference. They finished the season 3–9, 2–6 in AAC play to finish in a three-way tie for fourth place in the East Division.

== Schedule ==
ECU announced their 2017 football schedule on February 9, 2017. They hosted seven home games for the first time in school history.

East Carolina's schedule was reorganized by the American Athletic Conference on September 14 due to the effects of Hurricane Irma. Their game with UConn, originally scheduled for November 4, was moved to September 24. Their game against Houston was moved from October 28 to November 4.

Date	Time	Opponent	Site	TV	Result	Attendance
September 2	6:00 p.m.	No. 1 (FCS) James Madison*	Dowdy–Ficklen Stadium; Greenville, NC	ESPN3	L 14–34	40,169
September 9	Noon	at West Virginia*	Mountaineer Field; Morgantown, WV	FS2	L 20–56	56,797
September 16	3:30 p.m.	No. 16 Virginia Tech*	Dowdy–Ficklen Stadium; Greenville, NC	CBSSN	L 17–64	43,776
September 24	12:00 p.m.	at UConn	Rentschler Field; East Hartford, CT	ESPNU	W 41–38	14,036
September 30	12:00 p.m.	No. 18 South Florida	Dowdy–Ficklen Stadium; Greenville, NC	CBSSN	L 31–61	34,883
October 7	12:00 p.m.	Temple	Dowdy–Ficklen Stadium; Greenville, NC	ESPNU	L 10–34	31,326
October 14	7:15 p.m.	at No. 22 UCF	Spectrum Stadium; Orlando, FL	CBSSN	L 21–63	40,287
October 21	7:00 p.m.	BYU*^{†}	Dowdy–Ficklen Stadium; Greenville, NC	CBSSN	W 33–17	38,835
November 4	12:00 p.m.	at Houston	TDECU Stadium; Houston, TX	CBSSN	L 27–52	29,810
November 11	7:00 p.m.	Tulane	Dowdy–Ficklen Stadium; Greenville, NC	CBSSN	L 24–31 ^{OT}	36,178
November 18	12:00 p.m.	Cincinnati	Dowdy–Ficklen Stadium; Greenville, NC	CBSSN	W 48–20	31,923
November 25	12:00 p.m.	at No. 20 Memphis	Liberty Bowl Memorial Stadium; Memphis, TN	ESPNU	L 13–70	41,517
*Non-conference game; ^{†}Homecoming; Rankings from AP Poll, STATS Poll (FCS) and CFP Rankings, after October 31 - Released prior to game; All times are in Eastern time

== Coaching staff ==
Name	Title
Scottie Montgomery	Head coach
Ryan Anderson	Inside linebackers coach
Keith Gaither	Wide receivers coach
Brandon Lynch	Defensive backs coach
Shannon Moore	Special teams coordinator/tight ends coach
Jason Nichols	Running backs coach
Tony Petersen	Offensive coordinator/quarterbacks coach
Robert Prunty	Defensive line coach
Kenwick Thompson	Defensive coordinator
Geep Wade	Offensive line coach
John Gutekunst	Defensive analyst

== Game summaries ==
=== Vs. James Madison ===
James Madison at East Carolina

Team	1	2	3	4	Total
• #1 (FCS) Dukes	7	0	14	13	34
Pirates	0	0	7	7	14

- Date: September 2
- Location: Dowdy–Ficklen Stadium
  Greenville, NC
- Game start: 6:00 EDT
- TV announcers (ESPN3): Greg Mescall, Rene Ingoglia

=== At West Virginia ===
East Carolina at West Virginia

Team	1	2	3	4	Total
Pirates	3	0	10	7	20
• Mountaineers	21	28	7	0	56

- Date: September 9
- Location: Mountaineer Field
  Morgantown, WV
- Game start: 12:00 EDT
- TV announcers (FS2): Brian Custer, Ben Leber

=== Vs. Virginia Tech ===
Virginia Tech at East Carolina

Team	1	2	3	4	Total
• #16 Hokies	7	16	34	7	64
Pirates	17	0	0	0	17

- Date: September 16
- Location: Dowdy–Ficklen Stadium
  Greenville, NC
- Game start: 3:30 EDT
- TV announcers (CBS Sports Network): Dave Ryan, Corey Chavous, Melanie Collins

=== At UConn ===
East Carolina at UConn

Team	1	2	3	4	Total
• Pirates	21	6	14	0	41
Huskies	7	7	17	7	38

- Date: September 24
- Location: Rentschler Field
  East Hartford, CT
- Game start: 12:00 EDT
- TV announcers (ESPN2): Mike Corey, Rene Ingoglia

=== Vs. South Florida ===
South Florida at East Carolina

Team	1	2	3	4	Total
• #18 Bulls	21	10	17	13	61
Pirates	10	14	7	0	31

- Date: September 30
- Location: Dowdy–Ficklen Stadium
  Greenville, NC
- Game start: 12:00 EDT
- TV announcers (CBS Sports Network): John Sadak, Randy Cross, Jordan Daigle

=== Vs. Temple ===
Temple at East Carolina

Team	1	2	3	4	Total
• Owls	0	24	7	3	34
Pirates	3	0	7	0	10

- Date: October 7
- Location: Dowdy–Ficklen Stadium
  Greenville, NC
- Game start: 12:00 EDT
- TV announcers (ESPNU): Mike Couzens, John Congemi

=== At UCF ===
East Carolina at UCF

Team	1	2	3	4	Total
Pirates	7	7	0	7	21
• No. 22 Knights	21	21	7	14	63

- Date: October 14
- Location: Bright House Networks Stadium
  Orlando, FL
- Game start: 7:00 EDT
- TV announcers (CBS Sports Network): Rich Waltz, Aaron Murray, Cassie McKinney

=== Vs. BYU ===
BYU at East Carolina
(Homecoming Game)

Team	1	2	3	4	Total
Cougars	7	3	0	7	17
• Pirates	7	3	9	14	33

- Date: October 21
- Location: Dowdy–Ficklen Stadium
  Greenville, NC
- Game start: 7:00 EDT
- TV announcers (CBS Sports Network): Dave Ryan, Corey Chavous, Melanie Collins

=== At Houston ===
East Carolina at Houston

Team	1	2	3	4	Total
Pirates	0	10	7	10	27
• Cougars	21	7	17	7	52

- Date: November 4
- Location: TDECU Stadium
  Houston, TX
- Game start: 12:00 CDT
- TV announcers (CBS Sports Network): John Sadak, Randy Cross, Tina Cervasio

=== Vs. Tulane ===
Tulane at East Carolina

Team	1	2	3	4	OT	Total
• Green Wave	7	10	7	0	7	31
Pirates	7	7	0	10	0	24

- Date: November 11
- Location: Dowdy–Ficklen Stadium
  Greenville, NC
- Game start: 7:00 EDT
- TV announcers (CBS Sports Network): Dave Ryan, Corey Chavous, Melanie Collins

=== Vs. Cincinnati ===
Cincinnati at East Carolina

Team	1	2	3	4	Total
Bearcats	0	13	7	0	20
• Pirates	14	10	14	10	48

- Date: November 18
- Location: Dowdy–Ficklen Stadium
  Greenville, NC
- Game start: 12:00 EDT
- TV announcers (CBS Sports Network): Dave Ryan, Corey Chavous, Melanie Collins

=== At Memphis ===
East Carolina at Memphis

Team	1	2	3	4	Total
Pirates	0	0	13	0	13
• No. 17 Tigers	28	21	14	7	70

- Date: November 25
- Location: Liberty Bowl Memorial Stadium
  Memphis, TN
- Game start: 12:00 EDT
- TV announcers (ESPNU): Ryan Ruocco, Ray Bentley
