= 2017 UConn Huskies football team =

American college football season

2017 UConn Huskies football
- Conference: American Athletic Conference
- East Division
- Record: 3–9 (2–6 AAC)
- Head coach: Randy Edsall (13th season)
- Offensive coordinator: Rhett Lashlee (1st season)
- Offensive scheme: Spread
- Defensive coordinator: Billy Crocker (1st season)
- Base defense: 3–3–5
- Home stadium: Pratt & Whitney Stadium at Rentschler Field

2017 American Athletic Conference football standings
	Conf.			Overall
Team	W		L	W		L
East Division
No. 6 UCF xy$	8	–	0	13	–	0
No. 21 South Florida	6	–	2	10	–	2
Temple	4	–	4	7	–	6
Cincinnati	2	–	6	4	–	8
UConn	2	–	6	3	–	9
East Carolina	2	–	6	3	–	9
West Division
No. 25 Memphis xy	7	–	1	10	–	3
Houston	5	–	3	7	–	5
Navy	4	–	4	7	–	6
SMU	4	–	4	7	–	6
Tulane	3	–	5	5	–	7
Tulsa	1	–	7	2	–	10
Championship: UCF 62, Memphis 55
$ – Conference champion; x – Division champion/co-champions; y – Championship game participant; As of January 9, 2018; Rankings from AP Poll.

The 2017 UConn Huskies football team represented the University of Connecticut (UConn) as a member of the American Athletic Conference (AAC) during the 2017 NCAA Division I FBS football season. Led by 13th-year head coach Randy Edsall, who returned after having helmed the program from 1999 to 2010, the Huskies compiled an overall record of 3–9 with a mark of 2–6 in conference play, placing in a three-way tie for fourth at the bottom of the standings in the AAC's East Division. The team played home games at Pratt & Whitney Stadium at Rentschler Field in East Hartford, Connecticut.

== Schedule ==
Date	Time	Opponent	Site	TV	Result	Attendance
August 31	7:30 p.m.	Holy Cross*	Pratt & Whitney Stadium at Rentschler Field; East Hartford, CT	SNY	W 27–20	24,435
September 16	12:00 p.m.	at Virginia*	Scott Stadium; Charlottesville, VA	ESPN2	L 18–38	33,056
September 24^{[a]}	12:00 p.m.	East Carolina	Pratt & Whitney Stadium at Rentschler Field; East Hartford, CT	ESPNU	L 38–41	14,036
September 30	4:00 p.m.	at SMU	Gerald J. Ford Stadium; Dallas, TX	ESPNews	L 28–49	17,237
October 6	7:00 p.m.	Memphis	Pratt & Whitney Stadium at Rentschler Field; East Hartford, CT	ESPN	L 31–70	19,230
October 14	12:00 p.m.	at Temple	Lincoln Financial Field; Philadelphia, PA	ESPNews	W 28–24	29,849
October 21	12:00 p.m.	Tulsa^{†}	Pratt & Whitney Stadium at Rentschler Field; East Hartford, CT	ESPNU	W 20–14	24,814
October 28	6:30 p.m.	Missouri*	Pratt & Whitney Stadium at Rentschler Field; East Hartford, CT	CBSSN	L 12–52	21,062
November 4^{[a]}	3:30 p.m.	South Florida	Pratt & Whitney Stadium at Rentschler Field; East Hartford, CT	ESPNU	L 20–37	18,430
November 11	12:00 p.m.	at No. 14 UCF	Spectrum Stadium; Orlando, FL (Civil Conflict)	ESPNU	L 24–49	29,384
November 18	7:00 p.m.	vs. Boston College*	Fenway Park; Boston, MA	CBSSN	L 16–39	20,133
November 25	12:00 p.m.	at Cincinnati	Nippert Stadium; Cincinnati, OH	ESPNews	L 21–22	23,125
*Non-conference game; ^{†}Homecoming; Rankings from AP Poll released prior to the game; All times are in Eastern time

^{^[a]}The game between UConn and USF on originally scheduled for September 9 at noon before being moved to 10:30 a.m. and ultimately was cancelled due to Hurricane Irma. It has been rescheduled to November 4 (replacing the ECU game) and UConn will now host ECU Sunday, September 24 (replacing an open date).

== Game summaries ==
=== Holy Cross ===
Holy Cross Crusaders at Connecticut Huskies – Game summary

Quarter	1	2	3	4	Total
Crusaders	3	17	0	0	20
Huskies	7	0	7	13	27

at Pratt & Whitney Stadium at Rentschler Field • East Hartford, Connecticut

- Date: August 31, 2017
- Game time: 7:37 p.m. EST, Duration: 3:27
- Game weather: Temperature: 70 °F (21 °C) • Wind: W 2 • Weather: Pleasant
- Game attendance: 24,435
- Referee: Tracy Jones • Umpire: N. Pergine • Linesman: Daniel Shelton • Line Judge: Colin Gaynor • Back Judge: James Downey • Field Judge: Rick Santilli • Side Judge: Matt Waldron • Center Judge: Mark Mobra
- TV announcers (SNY): Eamon McAnaney (Play-by-play), Andy Gresh (color) & Taylor Rooks (sideline)
- Box Score

Game information

First Quarter

- HC • 03:32 • A.J. Wells 25 yd field goal • HC 3–0
- UCONN • 00:10 • Nate Hopkins 11 yd run (Mike Tarbutt kick) • UCONN 7–3

Second Quarter

- HC • 10:04 • Blaise Bell 19 yd pass from Peter Pujals (A.J. Wells kick) • HC 10–7
- HC • 04:39 • A.J. Wells 20 yd field goal • HC 13–7
- HC • 03:35 • Diquan Walker 6 yd run (A.J. Wells kick) • HC 20–7

Third Quarter

- UCONN • 00:15 • Nate Hopkins 3 yd run (Mike Tarbutt kick) • HC 20–14

Fourth Quarter

- UCONN • 12:02 • Hergy Mayala 11 yd pass from Bryant Shirreffs (Mike Tarbutt kick) • UCONN 21–20
- UCONN • 06:27 • Nate Hopkins 1 yd run (Mike Tarbutt kick failed) • UCONN 27–20

Top Passers

- HC – Peter Pujals 33/56, 358 yds, 1 TD
- UCONN – David Pindell 19/28, 154 yds

Top Rushers

- HC – Domenic Cozier 4 attempts, 42 yds
- UCONN – Nate Hopkins 20 attempts, 130 yds, 3 TDs

Top Receiving

- HC – Blaise Bell 10 receptions, 129 yds, 1 TD
- UCONN – Hergy Mayala 9 receptions, 106 yds, 1 TD

Top Tacklers

- HC – Ryan Brady 11 tackles
- UCONN – Jamar Summers 9.5 tackles

=== At Virginia ===
Connecticut Huskies at Virginia Cavaliers – Game summary

Quarter	1	2	3	4	Total
Huskies	0	0	6	12	18
Cavaliers	7	17	7	7	38

at Scott Stadium • Charlottesville, Virginia

- Date: September 16, 2017
- Game time: 12:01 p.m. EST, Duration: 2:59
- Game weather: Temperature: 78 °F (26 °C) • Wind: NE 1 • Weather: Cloudy
- Game attendance: 33,056
- Referee: C. Lamertina • Umpire: William Thomas • Linesman: Jim Casey • Line Judge: Stephen Ray • Back Judge: Byron Adams • Field Judge: Mark Windham • Side Judge: Jim Smith • Center Judge: Joe Clarkson
- TV announcers (ESPN2): Jason Benetti (Play-by-play), Kelly Stauffer (color) & Kris Budden (sideline)
- Box Score

Game information

First Quarter

- UVA • 02:06 • D Hamm 3 yd run (AJ Mejia kick) • UVA 7–0

Second Quarter

- UVA • 08:13 • AJ Mejia 28 yd field goal • UVA 10–0
- UVA • 04:29 • D Dowling 42 yd pass from K Benkert (AJ Mejia kick) • UVA 17–0
- UVA • 00:31 • J Ellis 7 yd run (AJ Mejia kick) • UVA 24–0

Third Quarter

- UVA • 01:24 • O Zaccheaus 30 yd pass from K Benkert (AJ Mejia kick) • UVA 31–0
- UCONN • 00:50 • Hergy Mayala 60 yd pass from Bryant Shirreffs (Quayon Skanes rush failed) • UVA 31–6

Fourth Quarter

- UCONN • 06:58 • Hergy Mayala 17 yd pass from Bryant Shirreffs (Bryant Shirreffs pass failed) • UVA 31–12
- UVA • 06:02 • A Levrone 73 yd pass from K Benkert (AJ Mejia kick) • UVA 38–12
- UCONN • 02:06 • Kevin Mensah 30 yd run (Bryant Shirreffs pass failed) • UVA 38–18

Top Passers

- UVA – K Benkert 30/40, 455 yds, 3 TD
- UCONN – Bryant Shirreffs 18/26, 227 yds, 2 TD

Top Rushers

- UVA – J Ellis 20 attempts, 95 yds, 1 TD
- UCONN – Bryant Shirreffs 14 attempts, 90 yds

Top Receiving

- UVA – O Zaccheaus 9 receptions, 122 yds, 1 TD
- UCONN – Quayon Skanes 4 receptions, 47 yds

Top Tacklers

- UVA – M Kiser 15 tackles
- UCONN – Tre Bell 10 tackles

=== East Carolina ===
East Carolina Pirates at Connecticut Huskies – Game summary

Quarter	1	2	3	4	Total
Pirates	21	6	14	0	41
Huskies	7	7	17	7	38

at Pratt & Whitney Stadium at Rentschler Field • East Hartford, Connecticut

- Date: September 24, 2017
- Game time: 12:02 p.m. EST, Duration: 3:20
- Game weather: Temperature: 84 °F (29 °C) • Wind: Calm • Weather: Hot and sunny
- Game attendance: 14,036
- Referee: Michael Roche • Umpire: Hilbert Byers • Linesman: Dan Harrington • Line Judge: Lance Thompson • Back Judge: M. Griffith • Field Judge: Ben Vasconcells • Side Judge: Ryan Robinson • Center Judge: Jon Baden
- TV announcers (ESPNU): Mike Corey (Play-by-play) & Rene Ingoglia (color)
- Box Score

Game information

First Quarter

- ECU • 10:14 • Davon Grayson 17 yd pass from Thomas Sirk (Jake Verity kick) • ECU 7–0
- UCONN • 08:52 • Maso Donaldson 45 yd pass from Bryant Shirreffs (Mike Tarbutt kick) • TIED 7–7
- ECU • 05:50 • Davon Grayson 24 yd pass from Thomas Sirk (Jake Verity kick) • ECU 14–7
- ECU • 03:46 • Derrell Scott 6 yd run (Jake Verity kick) • ECU 21–7

Second Quarter

- ECU • 13:12 • Jake Verity 46 yd field goal • ECU 24–7
- ECU • 05:51 • Jake Verity 26 yd field goal • ECU 27–7
- UCONN • 01:52 • Nate Hopkins 1 yd run (Mike Tarbutt kick) • ECU 27–14

Third Quarter

- ECU • 14:50 • Davon Grayson 75 yd pass from Thomas Sirk (Jake Verity kick) • ECU 34–14
- UCONN • 12:20 • Maso Donaldson 12 yd pass from Bryant Shirreffs (Mike Tarbutt kick) • ECU 34–21
- ECU • 11:00 • Hussein Howe 14 yd run (Jake Verity kick) • ECU 41–21
- UCONN • 08:54 • Arkeel Newsome 8 yd run (Mike Tarbutt kick) • ECU 41–28
- UCONN • 00:50 • Mike Tarbutt 20 yd field goal • ECU 41–31

Fourth Quarter

- UCONN • 05:48 • Arkeel Newsome 79 yd pass from Bryant Shirreffs (Mike Tarbutt kick) • ECU 41–38

Top Passers

- ECU – Thomas Sirk 30/39, 426 yds, 3 TD
- UCONN – Bryant Shirreffs 24/39, 406 yds, 3 TD

Top Rushers

- ECU – Derrell Scott 13 attempts, 36 yds, 1 TD
- UCONN – Kevin Mensah 16 attempts, 107 yds, 3 TDs

Top Receiving

- ECU – Davon Grayson 11 receptions, 223 yds, 3 TD
- UCONN – Arkeel Newsome 8 receptions, 170 yds, 1 TD

Top Tacklers

- ECU – Cannon Gibbs 14 tackles
- UCONN – Junior Joseph 14 tackles

=== At SMU ===
Connecticut Huskies at SMU Mustangs – Game summary

Quarter	1	2	3	4	Total
Huskies	7	3	10	8	28
Mustangs	7	14	7	21	49

at Gerald J. Ford Stadium • Dallas, Texas

- Date: September 30, 2017
- Game time: 4:05 p.m. EST, Duration: 3:07
- Game weather: Temperature: 81 °F (27 °C) • Wind: NE 4 • Weather: Mostly Sunny
- Game attendance: 17,237
- Referee: Todd LaPenta • Umpire: Bill Lamkin • Linesman: Todd Riddick • Line Judge: Jeffrey Cooney • Back Judge: Victor Firth • Field Judge: James Reif • Side Judge: Carlos Guzman • Center Judge: Terry Killens
- TV announcers (ESPNews): Shawn Keeney (Play-by-play) & Rene Ingoglia (color)
- Box Score

Game information

First Quarter

- SMU • 08:11 • C Sutton 6 yd pass from Ben Hicks (Josh Williams kick) • SMU 7–0
- UCONN • 06:26 • Aaron McLean 64 yd pass from Bryant Shirreffs (Mike Tarbutt kick) • TIED 7–7

Second Quarter

- SMU • 13:43 • Xavier Jones 25 yd run (Josh Williams kick) • SMU 14–7
- UCONN • 12:05 • Mike Tarbutt 42 yd field goal • SMU 14–10
- SMU • 07:31 • Trey Quinn 21 yd pass from Ben Hicks (Josh Williams kick) • SMU 21–10

Third Quarter

- UCONN • 09:31 • Nate Hopkins 2 yd run (Mike Tarbutt kick) • SMU 21–17
- UCONN • 03:01 • Mike Tarbutt 33 yd field goal • SMU 21–20
- SMU • 00:14 • Trey Quinn 15 yd pass from Ben Hicks (Josh Williams kick) • SMU 28–20

Fourth Quarter

- UCONN • 14:51 • Keyion Dixon 59 yd pass from Bryant Shirreffs (Tyler Davis pass from Bryant Shirreffs) • TIED 28–28
- SMU • 11:46 • C Sutton 34 yd pass from Ben Hicks (Josh Williams kick) • SMU 35–28
- SMU • 06:21 • Ke'Mon Freeman 3 yd run (Josh Williams kick) • SMU 42–28
- SMU • 04:24 • Braeden West 25 yd run (Josh Williams kick) • SMU 49–28

Top Passers

- SMU – Ben Hicks 27/37, 280 yds, 4 TD
- UCONN – Bryant Shirreffs 22/28, 408 yds, 2 TD

Top Rushers

- SMU – Braeden West 8 attempts, 72 yds, 1 TD
- UCONN – Nate Hopkins 10 attempts, 27 yds, 1 TD

Top Receiving

- SMU – Trey Quinn 15 receptions, 116 yds, 2 TD
- UCONN – Aaron McLean 5 receptions, 122 yds, 1 TD

Top Tacklers

- SMU – Kyran Mitchell 9 tackles
- UCONN – Junior Joseph 11 tackles

=== Memphis ===
Memphis Tigers at Connecticut Huskies – Game summary

Quarter	1	2	3	4	Total
Tigers	7	28	21	14	70
Huskies	14	10	0	7	31

at Pratt & Whitney Stadium at Rentschler Field • East Hartford, Connecticut

- Date: October 6, 2017
- Game time: 7:02 p.m. EST, Duration: 3:42
- Game weather: Temperature: 67 °F (19 °C) • Wind: Calm • Weather: Pleasant
- Game attendance: 19,230
- Referee: Tracy Jones • Umpire: N. Pergine • Linesman: Daniel Shelton • Line Judge: Colin Gaynor • Back Judge: James Downey • Field Judge: Rick Santilli • Side Judge: Matt Waldron • Center Judge: Mark Mobra
- TV announcers (ESPN): Dave LaMont (Play-by-play), Mack Brown (color) & Jen Lada (sideline)
- Box Score

Game information

First Quarter

- UCONN • 13:44 • Arkeel Newsome 64 yd run (Mike Tarbutt kick) • UCONN 7–0
- MEM • 11:02 • Sean Dykes 30 yd pass from Riley Ferguson (Spencer Smith kick) • TIED 7–7
- UCONN • 00:19 • Nate Hopkins 1 yd run (Mike Tarbutt kick) • UCONN 14–7

Second Quarter

- MEM • 14:00 • Anthony Miller 17 yd pass from Riley Ferguson (R Patterson kick) • TIED 14–14
- MEM • 08:00 • Anthony Miller 8 yd pass from Riley Ferguson (Spencer Smith kick) • MEM 21–14
- UCONN • 07:13 • Alec Bloom 30 yd pass from Bryant Shirreffs (Mike Tarbutt kick) • TIED 21–21
- MEM • 01:47 • Anthony Miller 40 yd pass from Riley Ferguson (R Patterson kick) • MEM 28–21
- MEM • 00:57 • Tony Pollard 14 yd pass from Riley Ferguson (Spencer Smith kick) • MEM 35–21
- UCONN • 00:04 • Mike Tarbutt 37 yd field goal • MEM 35–24

Third Quarter

- MEM • 10:23 • Joey Magnifico 5 yd pass from Riley Ferguson (R Patterson kick) • MEM 42–24
- MEM • 01:36 • Anthony Miller 32 yd pass from Riley Ferguson (Spencer Smith kick) • MEM 49–24
- MEM • 01:25 • D Dorceus 7 yd run (R Patterson kick) • MEM 56–24

Fourth Quarter

- MEM • 01:25 • D Dorceus 26 yd run (Spencer Smith kick) • MEM 63–24
- UCONN • 09:05 • Arkeel Newsome 13 yd run (Mike Tarbutt kick) • MEM 63–31
- MEM • 01:42 • Mechane 10 yd pass from David Moore (R Patterson kick) • MEM 70–31

Top Passers

- MEM – Riley Ferguson 34/48, 431 yds, 7 TD
- UCONN – Bryant Shirreffs 21/35, 310 yds, 1 TD

Top Rushers

- MEM – D Dorceus 22 attempts, 122 yds, 2 TD
- UCONN – Arkeel Newsome 9 attempts, 114 yds, 2 TD

Top Receiving

- MEM – Anthony Miller 15 receptions, 224 yds, 4 TD
- UCONN – Maso Donaldson 5 receptions, 50 yds

Top Tacklers

- MEM – Genard Avery 7 tackles
- UCONN – Junior Joseph 12 tackles

=== At Temple ===
Connecticut Huskies at Temple Owls – Game summary

Quarter	1	2	3	4	Total
Huskies	0	14	14	0	28
Owls	7	0	7	10	24

at Lincoln Financial Field • Philadelphia, Pennsylvania

- Date: October 14, 2017
- Game time: 12:02 p.m. EST, Duration: 3:19
- Game weather: Temperature: 67 °F (19 °C) • Wind: N 5-10 • Weather: Cloudy
- Game attendance: 29,849
- Referee: C. Lamertina • Umpire: K. Huffhines • Linesman: Jim Casey • Line Judge: Stephen Ray • Back Judge: Tom Fimmen • Field Judge: Mark Windham • Side Judge: Alex Moore • Center Judge: Joe Clarkson
- TV announcers (ESPNews): Bill Roth (Play-by-play) & Christian Ponder (color)
- Box Score

Game information

First Quarter

- TEM • 06:23 • David Hood 1 yd run (Aaron Boumerhi kick) • TEM 7–0

Second Quarter

- UCONN • 10:44 • Quayvon Skanes 6 yd pass from Bryant Shirreffs (Mike Tarbutt kick) • TIED 7–7
- UCONN • 05:17 • Hergy Mayala 6 yd pass from Bryant Shirreffs (Mike Tarbutt kick) • UCONN 14–7

Third Quarter

- UCONN • 09:30 • Arkeel Newsome 6 yd pass from Bryant Shirreffs (Mike Tarbutt kick) • UCONN 21–7
- TEM • 07:54 • Isaiah Wright 9 yd pass from Logan Marchi (Aaron Boumerhi kick) • UCONN 21–14
- UCONN • 06:37 • Tyler Coyle 34 yd interception return (Mike Tarbutt kick) • UCONN 28–14

Fourth Quarter

- TEM • 14:55 • R Armstead 10 yd run (Aaron Boumerhi kick) • UCONN 28–21
- TEM • 11:14 • Aaron Boumerhi 21 yd field goal • UCONN 28–24

Top Passers

- TEM – Logan Marchi 33/54, 356 yds, 1 TD
- UCONN – Bryant Shirreffs 18/28, 105 yds, 3 TD

Top Rushers

- TEM – R Armstead 9 attempts, 31 yds, 1 TD
- UCONN – Arkeel Newsome 18 attempts, 56 yds

Top Receiving

- TEM – David Hood 8 receptions, 91 yds
- UCONN – Hergy Mayala 4 receptions, 28 yds, 1 TD

Top Tacklers

- TEM – C Russell 12 tackles
- UCONN – Junior Joseph 11 tackles

=== Tulsa ===
Tulsa Golden Hurricane at Connecticut Huskies – Game summary

Quarter	1	2	3	4	Total
Golden Hurricane	0	0	0	14	14
Huskies	3	0	14	3	20

at Pratt & Whitney Stadium at Rentschler Field • East Hartford, Connecticut

- Date: October 21, 2017
- Game time: 12:01 p.m. EST, Duration: 3:03
- Game weather: Temperature: 65 °F (18 °C) • Wind: Calm • Weather: Sunny and warm
- Game attendance: 24,814
- Referee: Todd LaPenta • Umpire: Jeffrey Akers • Linesman: Todd Riddick • Line Judge: Jeffrey Cooney • Back Judge: Victor Firth • Field Judge: James Reif • Side Judge: Ken Bushey • Center Judge: Terry Killens
- TV announcers (ESPNU): Mike Couzens (Play-by-play) & John Congemi (color)
- Box Score

Game information

First Quarter

- UCONN • 00:44 • Mike Tarbutt 35 yd field goal • UCONN 3–0

Third Quarter

- UCONN • 10:13 • Nate Hopkins 1 yd run (Mike Tarbutt kick) • UCONN 10–0
- UCONN • 08:00 • Hergy Mayala 80 yd pass from Bryant Shirreffs (Mike Tarbutt kick) • UCONN 17–0

Fourth Quarter

- UCONN • 08:33 • Mike Tarbutt 28 yd field goal • UCONN 20–0
- TLSA • 07:09 • S Brooks 8 yd run (R Jones kick) • UCONN 20–7
- TLSA • 02:16 • S Brooks 1 yd run (R Jones kick) • UCONN 20–14

Top Passers

- TLSA – L Skipper 17/27, 259 yds
- UCONN – Bryant Shirreffs 23/29, 372 yds, 1 TD

Top Rushers

- TLSA – S Brooks 31 attempts, 164 yds, 2 TD
- UCONN – Nate Hopkins 21 attempts, 38 yds, 1 TD

Top Receiving

- TLSA – J Hobbs 9 receptions, 96 yds
- UCONN – Tyraiq Beals 5 receptions, 60 yds

Top Tacklers

- TLSA – C Edmiston 17 tackles
- UCONN – Brayden Brown 9 tackles

=== Missouri ===
Missouri Tigers at Connecticut Huskies – Game summary

Quarter	1	2	3	4	Total
Tigers	21	10	14	7	52
Huskies	2	3	7	0	12

at Pratt & Whitney Stadium at Rentschler Field • East Hartford, Connecticut

- Date: October 28, 2017
- Game time: 6:37 p.m. EST, Duration: 3:34
- Game weather: Temperature: 60 °F (16 °C) • Wind: S 5 • Weather: Pleasant and mild
- Game attendance: 21,062
- Referee: Marc Curles • Umpire: Brent Sowell • Linesman: Randall Kizer • Line Judge: Chris Conway • Back Judge: Scott Vaughan • Field Judge: Wes Booker • Side Judge: Chris Jamison • Center Judge: Chris Garner
- TV announcers (CBSSN): Dave Ryan (Play-by-play), Corey Chavous (color) & Melanie Collins (sideline)
- Box Score

Game information

First Quarter

- UCONN • 13:40 • Team Safety • UCONN 2–0
- MIZZOU • 10:48 • J'Mon Moore 4 yd pass from Drew Lock (Tucker McCann kick) • MIZZOU 7–2
- MIZZOU • 06:48 • Al Okwuegbunam 4 yd pass from Drew Lock (Tucker McCann kick) • MIZZOU 14–2
- MIZZOU • 01:08 • Al Okwuegbunam 9 yd pass from Drew Lock (Tucker McCann kick) • MIZZOU 21–2

Second Quarter

- UCONN • 11:09 • Mike Tarbutt 30 yd field goal • MIZZOU 21–5
- MIZZOU • 07:03 • Tucker McCann 37 yd field goal • MIZZOU 24–5
- MIZZOU • 03:11 • Ish Witter 6 yd run (Tucker McCann kick) • MIZZOU 31–5

Third Quarter

- MIZZOU • 13:03 • J'Mon Moore 13 yd pass from Drew Lock (Tucker McCann kick) • MIZZOU 38–5
- MIZZOU • 10:26 • Johnat Johnson 72 yd pass from Drew Lock (Tucker McCann kick) • MIZZOU 45–5
- UCONN • 02:07 • Kevin Mensah 1 yd run (Mike Tarbutt kick) • MIZZOU 45–12

Fourth Quarter

- MIZZOU • 04:11 • Micah Wilson 22 yd run (Tucker McCann kick) • MIZZOU 52–12

Top Passers

- MIZZOU – Drew Lock 31/37, 377 yds, 5 TD
- UCONN – Bryant Shirreffs 19/39, 202 yds

Top Rushers

- MIZZOU – Ish Witter 10 attempts, 73 yds, 1 TD
- UCONN – Kevin Mensah 16 attempts, 64 yds, 1 TD

Top Receiving

- MIZZOU – J'Mon Moore 8 receptions, 96 yds, 2 TD
- UCONN – Hergy Mayala 9 receptions, 116 yds

Top Tacklers

- MIZZOU – Cale Garrett 6 tackles
- UCONN – Marshe Terry 9 tackles

=== South Florida ===
South Florida Bulls at Connecticut Huskies – Game summary

Quarter	1	2	3	4	Total
Bulls	7	10	17	3	37
Huskies	0	7	0	13	20

at Pratt & Whitney Stadium at Rentschler Field • East Hartford, Connecticut

- Date: November 4, 2017
- Game time: 3:32 p.m. EST, Duration: 3:10
- Game weather: Temperature: 56 °F (13 °C) • Wind: W 4 • Weather: Sunny and seasonable
- Game attendance: 18,430
- Referee: Michael Roche • Umpire: Hilbert Byers • Linesman: Adam Loudin • Line Judge: Lance Thompson • Back Judge: M. Griffith • Field Judge: Ben Vasconcells • Side Judge: Ryan Robinson • Center Judge: Jon Baden
- TV announcers (ESPNU): Dave LaMont (Play-by-play) & Ray Bentley (color)
- Box Score

Game information

First Quarter

- USF • 07:46 • D'Erne Johnson 1 yd run (Emili Nadelman kick) • USF 7–0

Second Quarter

- USF • 12:40 • Mitch Wilcox 12 yd pass from Q Flowers (Emili Nadelman kick) • USF 14–0
- UCONN • 07:10 • Tommy Myers 2 yd pass from Bryant Shirreffs (Mike Tarbutt kick) • USF 14–7
- USF • 03:16 • Emili Nadelman 38 yd field goal • USF 17–7

Third Quarter

- USF • 10:44 • Emili Nadelman 25 yd field goal • USF 20–7
- USF • 02:58 • D'Erne Johnson 11 yd pass from Q Flowers (Emili Nadelman kick) • USF 27–7
- USF • 00:17 • Marq Scantling 95 yd pass from Q Flowers (Emili Nadelman kick) • USF 34–7

Fourth Quarter

- UCONN • 14:07 • Kevin Mensah 23 yd run (Mike Tarbutt kick) • USF 34–14
- USF • 10:23 • Emili Nadelman 51 yd field goal • USF 37–14
- UCONN • 06:24 • David Pindell 10 yd run (David Pindell pass intercepted) • USF 37–20

Top Passers

- USF – Q Flowers 24/37, 385 yds, 3 TD
- UCONN – Bryant Shirreffs 17/23, 133 yds, 1 TD

Top Rushers

- USF – Q Flowers 16 attempts, 131 yds
- UCONN – Kevin Mensah 22 attempts, 95 yds, 1 TD

Top Receiving

- USF – Marq Scantling 6 receptions, 152 yds, 1 TD
- UCONN – Hergy Mayala 4 receptions, 45 yds

Top Tacklers

- USF – Nico Sawtelle 10 tackles
- UCONN – Junior Joesph 9 tackles

=== At UCF ===
Connecticut Huskies at UCF Knights – Game summary

Quarter	1	2	3	4	Total
Huskies	3	7	7	7	24
No. 14 Knights	21	7	0	21	49

at Spectrum Stadium • Orlando, Florida

- Date: November 11, 2017
- Game time: 12:02 p.m. EST, Duration: 3:23
- Game weather: Temperature: 73 °F (23 °C) • Wind: ENE 13 • Weather: Cloudy
- Game attendance: 29,384
- Referee: C. Lamertina • Umpire: K. Huffhines • Linesman: Jim Casey • Line Judge: Stephen Ray • Back Judge: Byron Adams • Field Judge: Mark Windham • Side Judge: B. Williams • Center Judge: Joe Clarkson
- TV announcers (ESPNU): Mike Couzens (Play-by-play) & John Congemi (color)
- Box Score

Game information

First Quarter

- UCF • 11:06 • O Anderson 3 yd run (Matthew Wright kick) • UCF 7–0
- UCONN • 05:15 • Mike Tarbutt 20 yd field goal • UCF 7–3
- UCF • 02:52 • Adrian Killins 4 yd run (Matthew Wright kick) • UCF 14–3
- UCF • 00:20 • Mar Williams 6 yd pass from M Milton (Matthew Wright kick) • UCF 21–3

Second Quarter

- UCONN • 09:57 • Maso Donaldson 12 yd pass from David Pindell (Mike Tarbutt kick) • UCF 21–10
- UCF • 07:43 • Tre'Quan Smith 41 yd pass from M Milton (Matthew Wright kick) • UCF 28–10

Third Quarter

- UCONN • 13:21 • David Pindell 9 yd run (Mike Tarbutt kick) • UCF 28–17

Fourth Quarter

- UCF • 14:11 • O Anderson 65 yd run (Matthew Wright kick) • UCF 35–17
- UCF • 08:54 • M Milton 4 yd run (Matthew Wright kick) • UCF 42–17
- UCF • 07:03 • Cam Stewart 35 yd pass from Noah Vedral (Matthew Wright kick) • UCF 49–17
- UCONN • 00:36 • Aaron McLean 22 yd pass from David Pindell (Mike Tarbutt kick) • UCF 49–24

Top Passers

- UCF – M Milton 24/36, 311 yds, 2 TD
- UCONN – David Pindell 18/31, 201 yds, 2 TD

Top Rushers

- UCF – O Anderson 9 attempts, 84 yds, 2 TD
- UCONN – David Pindell 21 attempts, 96 yds, 1 TD

Top Receiving

- UCF – Gabriel Davis 8 receptions, 95 yds
- UCONN – Quayvon Skanes 4 receptions, 27 yds

Top Tacklers

- UCF – Kyle Gibson 9 tackles
- UCONN – Tyler Coyle 12 tackles

=== vs Boston College ===
Boston College Eagles vs Connecticut Huskies – Game summary

Quarter	1	2	3	4	Total
Eagles	0	14	19	6	39
Huskies	3	0	0	13	16

at Fenway Park • Boston, Massachusetts

- Date: November 18, 2017
- Game time: 7:11 p.m. EST, Duration: 3:25
- Game weather: Temperature: 48 °F (9 °C) • Wind: W 3 • Weather: Cool and damp
- Game attendance: 20,133
- Referee: Tra Blake • Umpire: Mark Wilson • Linesman: Troy Gray • Line Judge: Colin Formulak • Back Judge: Bryan Platt • Field Judge: Harry Tyson • Side Judge: Mike McCarthy • Center Judge: Marcus Woods
- TV announcers (CBSSN): Rich Waltz (Play-by-play), Aaron Murray (color) & Cassie McKinney (sideline)
- Box Score

Game information

First Quarter

- UCONN • 11:03 • Mike Tarbutt 50 yd field goal • UCONN 3–0

Second Quarter

- BC • 06:13 • C Garrison 2 yd pass from D Wade (C Lichtenberg kick) • BC 7–3
- BC • 03:07 • A Dillon 53 yd run (C Lichtenberg kick) • BC 14–3

Third Quarter

- BC • 13:04 • J Hilliman 38 yd run (C Lichtenberg kick) • BC 21–3
- BC • 09:41 • T Torres 65 yd interception return (C Lichtenberg kick failed) • BC 27–3
- BC • 03:06 • A Dillon 20 yd run (C Lichtenberg kick failed) • BC 33–3

Fourth Quarter

- BC • 07:20 • J Hilliman 3 yd run (C Lichtenberg kick failed) • BC 39–3
- UCONN • 06:31 • Kevin Mensah 70 yd run (Mike Tarbutt kick) • BC 39–10
- UCONN • 04:15 • Hergy Mayala 43 yd pass from David Pindell (David Pindell pass failed) • BC 39–16

Top Passers

- BC – D Wade 7/15, 55 yds, 1 TD
- UCONN – David Pindell 14/33, 241 yds, 1 TD

Top Rushers

- BC – A Dillon 24 attempts, 200 yds, 2 TD
- UCONN – Kevin Mensah 16 attempts, 115 yds, 1 TD

Top Receiving

- BC – T Sweeney 2 receptions, 42 yds
- UCONN – Hergy Mayala 5 receptions, 65 yds, 1 TD

Top Tacklers

- BC – Z Allen 11 tackles
- UCONN – Tyler Coyle 7 tackles

=== At Cincinnati ===
Connecticut Huskies at Cincinnati Bearcats – Game summary

Quarter	1	2	3	4	Total
Huskies	3	3	9	6	21
Bearcats	0	7	0	15	22

at Nippert Stadium • Cincinnati, Ohio

- Date: November 25, 2017
- Game time: 12:01 p.m. EST, Duration: 3:12
- Game weather: Temperature: 53 °F (12 °C) • Wind: WSW 6 • Weather: Cloudy
- Game attendance: 23,125
- Referee: A. Calabrese • Umpire: K. Huffhines • Linesman: Jim Casey • Line Judge: Baron Ballester • Back Judge: Byron Adams • Field Judge: Glen Wilson • Side Judge: Jim Smith • Center Judge: Charles Lewis
- TV announcers (ESPNews): Bill Roth (Play-by-play) & Brian Kinchen (color)
- Box Score

Game information

First Quarter

- UCONN • 07:50 • Mike Tarbutt 37 yd field goal • UCONN 3–0

Second Quarter

- UCONN • 07:07 • Mike Tarbutt 26 yd field goal • UCONN 6–0
- CIN • 00:43 • Kahlil Lewis 13 yd pass from Hayden Moore (Ryan Jones kick) • CIN 7–6

Third Quarter

- UCONN • 07:02 • David Pindell 1 yd run (David Pindell pass failed) • UCONN 12–7
- UCONN • 02:07 • Mike Tarbutt 53 yd field goal • UCONN 15–7

Fourth Quarter

- CIN • 14:42 • Kahlil Lewis 12 yd pass from Hayden Moore (Mike Boone pass from Hayden Moore) • TIED 15–15
- CIN • 01:28 • Hayden Moore 4 yd run (Ryan Jones kick) • CIN 22–15
- UCONN • 00:00 • Hergy Mayala 2 yd pass from David Pindell (Mike Tarbutt kick failed) • CIN 22–21

Top Passers

- CIN – Hayden Moore 19/28, 199 yds, 2 TD
- UCONN – David Pindell 27/51, 273 yds, 1 TD

Top Rushers

- CIN – Mike Boone 14 attempts, 83 yds
- UCONN – David Pindell 22 attempts, 95 yds, 1 TD

Top Receiving

- CIN – Thomas Geddis 6 receptions, 65 yds
- UCONN – Keyion Dixon 8 receptions, 67 yds

Top Tacklers

- CIN – Jaylyin Minor 15 tackles
- UCONN – Omar Fortt 12 tackles

== Roster ==
2017 UConn Huskies football team roster
Players
Coaches
Offense

Pos.	#	Name	Class
WR	1	Hergy Mayala	Jr
WR	2	Tyraiq Beals	Jr
WR	3	Garrison Burnett	Fr
QB	4	Bryant Shirreffs	RSr
QB	5	David Pindell	Jr
QB	7	Marvin Washington	Fr
WR	8	Aaron McLean	Jr
WR	9	Tyler Davis	RSo
WR	10	Zavier Scott	Fr
RB	11	Nate Hopkins	RFr
QB	12	Brandon Bisack	RSo
WR	15	Donovan Williams	So
QB	17	Jordan McAfee	Fr
QB	18	Brad Westmark	RJr
WR	19	Quayvon Skanes	RFr
RB	22	Arkeel Newsome	Sr
WR	23	Keyion Dixon	RFr
RB	24	Ja'Kevious Vickers	RFr
WR	26	Kyle Buss	Jr
WR	28	Quimonei Bell-Hunter	Fr
RB	34	Kevin Mensah	Fr
WR	35	Jarrell Chaney	Fr
RB	48	Jason Thompson	RJr
RB	49	Donevin O'Reilly	RSo
OL	54	Robert Holmes	Fr
OL	55	Stanley Hubbard III	Fr
OL	56	Nino Leone	RFr
OL	60	Ben Bonvicini	RSo
OL	62	Tommy Hopkins	RSr
OL	63	Ryan Crozier	RJr
OL	65	Matt Peart	RSo
OL	67	Bryan Cespedes	RSo
OL	70	Cam DeGeorge	RFr
OL	71	James Tunstall	Fr
OL	72	Brendan Vechery	RSr
OL	73	Steve Hashemi	Sr
OL	74	Ryan Van Demark	Fr
OL	75	Daniel Oak	RJr
OL	76	Harrison Newman	RFr
OL	77	Trey Rutherford	Sr
OL	78	Ian Campbell	RSo
OL	79	Kyle Schafenacker	RSr
TE	80	Tommy Myers	RSr
WR	82	Mason Donaldson	RFr
WR	83	TJ Vernieri	RSo
WR	84	Bryan Coney	RSo
TE	86	Alec Bloom	Sr
WR	87	Cameron Hairston	Fr
TE	89	Ryan Fitton	Fr
TE	90	Zordan Holman	RSo
TE	91	Jay Rose	Fr

Defense

Pos.	#	Name	Class
DB	1	Tre Bell	RSr
DB	6	Eddie Hahn	RFr
LB	10	Cameron Stapleton	RSr
LB	11	Junior Joseph	RSr
LB	12	E.J. Levenberry	RSr
LB	13	Vontae Diggs	Sr
DB	14	Tahj Herring-Wilson	RFr
DL	15	Luke Carrezola	Sr
DB	16	Brice McAllister	Sr
DB	18	Abiola Olaniyan	Fr
DB	20	Robert P. King III	Fr
DB	21	Jamar Summers	Sr
LB	22	Eli Thomas	RSo
DB	25	Tyler Coyle	RFr
DB	27	Omar Fortt	Fr
DB	28	Justin Morehead	Fr
DB	29	Anthony Watkins	RJr
DB	30	Jordan Swann	Fr
DB	31	John Robinson IV	RSo
DB	32	Aaron Garland	RSo
LB	33	Chris Britton	RJr
DB	36	Brayden Brown	Fr
DB	37	Kyle Williams	So
LB	38	Jeff Woodcock	RJr
DB	39	Chris Jean-Pierre	RSo
DB	41	Marshé Terry	RSo
LB	42	T.J. Gardner	Fr
LB	43	Darrian Beavers	Fr
DB	44	Ian Swenson	Fr
LB	45	Ryan Gilmartin	RFr
DL	46	AJ Garson	RFr
LB	47	Santana Sterling	Jr
LB	49	Rhakim Williams	RFr
DL	50	Sheriden Lawley	RJr
DL	52	Caleb Thomas	Fr
DL	57	Cole Ormsby	RSr
DL	58	Philippe Okounam	RSo
DL	59	Andrew Migliaccio	RFr
DL	88	Connor Freeborn	RSo
DL	92	Carlton Steer	Jr
DL	93	Folorunso Fatukasi	RSr
DL	94	Kevin Murphy	RSo
DL	95	Noel Brouse	RFr
DL	96	James Atkins	RJr

Special teams

Pos.	#	Name	Class
K	16	Will Rishell	RSr
K	40	Michael Tarbutt	RSo
LS	51	Nick Zecchino	So
LS	53	Brian Keating	Fr
LS	66	Jeffrey Sidebotham	RFr
P	81	Brett Graham	RFr
P	99	Luke Magliozzi	Fr

Head coach

- Randy Edsall

Coordinators/assistant coaches

- Terry Richardson – Assistant Head Coach/Running Backs
- Billy Crocker – Defensive Coordinator
- Rhett Lashlee – Offensive Coordinator
- Corey Edsall – Tight Ends
- Curome Cox – Defensive Backs
- Dennis Dottin-Carter – Defensive Line
- J.B. Grimes – Offensive Line
- Aaron Smith – Wide Receivers
- Jon Wholley – Linebackers
- Ryan Steinberg – Director of Football Operations
- Eric Klein – Director of Football Strength and Conditioning
- Michael Zyskowski – Director of Player Personnel
- Andy Baylock – Director of UConn Football Alumni/Community Affairs
- Rebecca Dunstan – Director of Football Office Administration
- Chris White – Senior Quality Control/Director of Football Research & Special Project
- Jonathan Brewer – Offensive Quality Control
- Shane Brady – Defensive Quality Control
- David Harris – Recruiting Assistant
- Robert Downes – Recruiting Assistant
- Ben Abitz – Offensive Graduate Assistant
- Kyle Cooper – Offensive Graduate Assistant
- Thomas Dumont – Defensive Graduate Assistant
- Matt Robinson – Defensive Graduate Assistant

Legend

- (C) Team captain
- (S) Suspended
- (I) Ineligible
- Injured
- Redshirt

Roster

== Players in the 2018 NFL draft ==
Player	Position	Round	Pick	NFL club
Folorunso Fatukasi	Defensive tackle	6	180	New York Jets
