= 2017 Navy Midshipmen football team =

American college football season

2017 Navy Midshipmen football

Military Bowl champion

Military Bowl, W 49–7 vs. Virginia
- Conference: American Athletic Conference
- West Division
- Record: 7–6 (4–4 AAC)
- Head coach: Ken Niumatalolo (10th season)
- Offensive coordinator: Ivin Jasper (10th season)
- Offensive scheme: Triple option
- Defensive coordinator: Dale Pehrson (2nd season)
- Base defense: Multiple
- MVP: Malcolm Perry
- Captains: Darryl Bonner; D. J. Palmore
- Home stadium: Navy–Marine Corps Memorial Stadium

2017 American Athletic Conference football standings
	Conf.			Overall
Team	W		L	W		L
East Division
No. 6 UCF xy$	8	–	0	13	–	0
No. 21 South Florida	6	–	2	10	–	2
Temple	4	–	4	7	–	6
Cincinnati	2	–	6	4	–	8
UConn	2	–	6	3	–	9
East Carolina	2	–	6	3	–	9
West Division
No. 25 Memphis xy	7	–	1	10	–	3
Houston	5	–	3	7	–	5
Navy	4	–	4	7	–	6
SMU	4	–	4	7	–	6
Tulane	3	–	5	5	–	7
Tulsa	1	–	7	2	–	10
Championship: UCF 62, Memphis 55
$ – Conference champion; x – Division champion/co-champions; y – Championship game participant; As of January 9, 2018; Rankings from AP Poll.

The 2017 Navy Midshipmen football team represented the United States Naval Academy in the 2017 NCAA Division I FBS football season. The Midshipmen were led by tenth-year head coach Ken Niumatalolo and played their home games at Navy–Marine Corps Memorial Stadium. The Midshipmen competed as a member of the West Division of the American Athletic Conference and were third-year members of the conference. They finished the season 7–6 overall and 4–4 in AAC play to tie for third place in the West Division. They were invited to the Military Bowl, where they defeated Virginia, 49–7.

== Before the season ==
=== Spring practices ===
Navy held spring practices during March and April 2017.

== During the season ==
=== On television ===
The 2017 Navy Midshipmen football team is featured in the miniseries, A Season With Navy Football on Showtime, which premiered on Tuesday September 5, 2017. It depicts daily life of Midshipmen football players and coaches at the United States Naval Academy in Annapolis, Maryland. Each episode reviews highlights of every football game played during the current season of Navy football, as the series narrator boasts, is "one of the most accomplished football programs in the country".

== Schedule ==
Date	Time	Opponent	Rank	Site	TV	Result	Attendance
September 1	8:00 p.m.	at Florida Atlantic*		FAU Stadium; Boca Raton, FL	ESPNU	W 42–19	28,481
September 9	3:30 p.m.	Tulane		Navy–Marine Corps Memorial Stadium; Annapolis, MD	CBSSN	W 23–21	30,420
September 23	3:30 p.m.	Cincinnati		Navy–Marine Corps Memorial Stadium; Annapolis, MD	CBSSN	W 42–32	33,134
September 30	3:30 p.m.	at Tulsa		Skelly Field at H. A. Chapman Stadium; Tulsa, OK	ESPNU	W 31–21	21,354
October 7	3:30 p.m.	Air Force*		Navy–Marine Corps Memorial Stadium; Annapolis, MD (Commander-in-Chief's Trophy)	CBSSN	W 48–45	38,792
October 14	3:45 p.m.	at Memphis	No. 25	Liberty Bowl Memorial Stadium; Memphis, TN	ESPNU	L 27–30	40,177
October 21	3:30 p.m.	No. 20 UCF^{†}		Navy–Marine Corps Memorial Stadium; Annapolis, MD	CBSSN	L 21–31	35,277
November 2	8:00 p.m.	at Temple		Lincoln Financial Field; Philadelphia, PA	ESPN	L 26–34	26,127
November 11	3:30 p.m.	SMU		Navy–Marine Corps Memorial Stadium; Annapolis, MD (Gansz Trophy)	CBSSN	W 43–40	36,157
November 18	3:30 p.m.	at No. 9 Notre Dame*		Notre Dame Stadium; Notre Dame, IN (rivalry)	NBC	L 17–24	77,622
November 24	12:00 p.m.	at Houston		TDECU Stadium; Houston, TX	ESPN	L 14–24	29,252
December 9	3:00 p.m.	vs. Army*		Lincoln Financial Field; Philadelphia, PA (Army–Navy Game, College GameDay)	CBS	L 13–14	68,625
December 28	1:30 p.m.	Virginia*		Navy–Marine Corps Memorial Stadium; Annapolis, MD (Military Bowl)	ESPN	W 49–7	35,921
*Non-conference game; ^{†}Homecoming; Rankings from AP Poll released prior to the game; All times are in Eastern time

== Personnel ==
=== Coaching staff ===
Name	Position	Seasons at Navy	Alma mater
Ken Niumatalolo	Head Coach	19	Hawaii (1989)
Ivin Jasper	Offensive Coordinator / quarterbacks coach	18	Hawaii (1994)
Dale Pehrson	Defensive Coordinator / defensive line coach	22	Utah (1976)
Justin Davis	Outside Linebackers Coach	11	Maine (2001)
Lt. Col. Robert Green, USMC	Outside Linebackers Coach	5	Navy (1998)
Ashley Ingram	Running Game Coordinator / offensive line coach	10	North Alabama (1996)
Steve Johns	Inside Linebackers	10	Occidental College (1991)
Dan O'Brien	Secondary Coach	4	Boston College (2005)
Mike Judge	Fullbacks Coach	10	Springfield College (2005)
Shaun Nua	Defensive line coach	6	BYU (2005)
Danny O'Rourke	Special Teams Coordinator / slotbacks coach	16	West Georgia (2000)
Napoleon Sykes	Defensive line coach	4	Wake Forest (2006)
Mick Yokitis	Wide Receivers Coach	7	Hawaii (2006)

=== Roster ===
2017 Navy Midshipmen football team roster
Quarterbacks: 1 Reggie Harris – freshman (5'7, 165); 2 Evan Fochtman – freshman (6'1, 185); 3 Jacob Harrison – sophomore (6'1, 194); 5 Dalen Morris – freshman (6'1, 195); 6 Emmett Davis – freshman (6'1, 170) (+SB); 7 Garret Lewis – junior (6'1, 200); 9 Zach Abey – junior (6'2, 212); 14 Chase Parrish – freshman (5'11, 181); Slotbacks: 2 C.J. Williams – freshman (5'8, 170); 3 Myles Fells – freshman (5'11, 187); 4 Garrett Winn – freshman (5'10, 170); 7 Justin Smith – freshman (5'11, 188); 8 Mazh Maloy – sophomore (5'7, 170); 10 Malcolm Perry – sophomore (5'9, 185) (+QB); 20 John Brown III – senior (5'9, 203); 21 Tre Walker – junior (5'9, 190) (injured); 22 Travis Brannan – sophomore (6'0, 180); 23 Amari DuBose – sophomore (5'9, 165); 25 Jahmaal Daniel – senior (5'6, 160); 28 Josh Brown – senior (5'9, 189); 29 Darryl Bonner – senior (5'7, 178) (C); 36 Keoni-Kordell Makekau – freshman (5'11, 170); 37 Cameron Dudeck – junior (5'9, 189); 40 Mason Plante – sophomore (5'11, 188); 41 Tyreek King-El – freshman (5'8, 155); 46 Travis Pospisil – junior (5'10, 198); Fullbacks: 24 Joshua Walker – senior (5'11, 222) (injured); 26 Jonnie Lee – freshman (5'9, 195); 31 Myles Benning – sophomore (5'11, 235); 32 Bryan Hammond – junior (5'10, 200); 33 Chris High – senior (6'0, 224) (injured); 34 Mike Martin – junior (6'1, 202); 35 Cooper Hardin – freshman (6'1, 225); 37 Tory Delmonico – freshman (6'2, 218); 38 Anthony Gargiulo – junior (6'2, 239); 43 Nelson Smith – freshman (5'9, 206); 45 Ahmir Lee – freshman (6'0, 230); 46 Akili Taylor – sophomore (5'7, 205); Wide receivers: 11 Darian Pride – sophomore (6'3, 210); 15 Kody Crider – freshman (6'3, 220); 47 Trey Olsen – senior (6'4, 224); 49 Jordan Pittman – senior (6'2, 235); 80 Terrence Laster – senior (6'1, 230); 81 Conrey Meagher – senior (5'10, 188); 82 Craig Scott – senior (6'2, 189); 83 Zack Fraade – sophomore (6'3, 215); 85 Ryan Mitchell – freshman (6'3, 190); 84 Chad Lewellyn – senior (6'4, 201); 86 Dre Williamson – junior (6'4, 208); 87 Brandon Colon – senior (6'4, 223); 88 Tyler Carmona – senior (6'4, 227); 89 Taylor Jackson – junior (6'3, 210); Placekickers: 4 Owen White – sophomore (5'10, 195); 16 Bennett Moehring – junior (5'9, 180); 41 J.R. Osborn – sophomore (6'0, 191); 97 Keller Farni – freshman (5'11, 225)	Offensive linemen: 50 Nick Novak – C – freshman (6'4, 270); 50 Eric Cal – C – sophomore (6'3, 282); 51 Justin Self – OT – freshman (6'2, 270); 52 Kurt Stengel – OT – freshman (6'4, 265); 53 Jude Hydrick – OT – sophomore (6'3, 256); 54 Ben Everett – OG – freshman (6'4, 270); 55 Mike Adzima – OG – sophomore (6'2, 282); 56 Sean Rattay – C – freshman (6'1, 290); 57 Jake Hawk – OT – junior (6'6, 295); 58 Billy Honaker – OT – freshman (6'3, 270); 59 Wes Mehl – C – sophomore (6'4, 301); 59 Isaac Willis – OG – sophomore (6'0, 286); 60 T.J. Salu – OG – sophomore (6'2, 291); 61 Andrew Wood – OT – junior (6'4, 290); 62 Parker Wade – C – senior (6'2, 280); 63 Seth White – OG – senior (6'3, 274); 64 Steve Satchell – OG – junior (6'4, 296); 65 Peter Nestrowitz – OG – freshman (6'3, 270); 66 Nikko Yaramus – OG – sophomore (6'3, 282); 67 Chris Gesell – OG – junior (6'4, 307); 68 David Forney – C – sophomore (6'3, 318); 70 Elijah Lugo – OG – freshman (6'4, 279); 71 Evan Martin – OG – senior (6'3, 294); 72 Ford Higgins – OT – sophomore (6'2, 250); 73 Michael Raiford – OT – senior (6'6, 302); 74 Alec Keener – OT – junior (6'4, 278); 75 Robert Lindsey – OG – senior (6'4, 275); 76 Kendel Wright – OT – sophomore (6'4, 290); 77 Bryan Barrett – OG – junior (6'3, 330); 78 Laurent Njiki – OG – junior (6'3, 306); 79 Kyle-Malik Mitchell – OG – sophomore (6'2, 303); Defensive linemen: 46 Denzel Polk – DE – sophomore (6'2, 241); 52 Vic Thomas – DE – sophomore (6'4, 237); 60 Lance Angulo – NG – junior (6'2, 285); 62 Buck Elliott – DE – junior (6'4, 249); 63 Tony Masaniai – DE – sophomore (6'1, 256); 65 Alema Kapoi – DE – freshman (6'0, 275); 69 Marcus Edwards – DE – sophomore (6'4, 294); 70 Mack Nash – DE – sophomore (6'5, 261); 72 Gunner Osborn – DE – sophomore (6'3, 275); 73 Jackson Perkins – DE – freshman (6'6, 235); 74 Joshua Van Dunk – NG – sophomore (6'3, 293); 75 Bradley Osborne – DE – freshman (6'3, 265); 76 Tobe Okafor – DE – freshman (6'4, 270); 77 Chris Pearson – NG – freshman (6'2, 315); 90 Jarvis Polu – DE – junior (6'3, 292); 91 Tyler Sayles – DE – senior (6'2, 257); 92 Josh Webb – DE – junior (6'5, 250); 93 Joe Goff – DE – sophomore (6'5, 275); 94 Corbin Heyward – DE – sophomore (6'3, 280); 95 Anthony Villalobos – DE – junior (6'2, 261); 96 Nizaire Cromatie – DE – sophomore (6'2, 243); 97 Dave Tolentino – NG – sophomore (6'2, 294); 98 Dylan Fischer – NG – junior (6'2, 307); 99 Jackson Pittman – NG – sophomore (6'3, 304); Punters: 43 Erik Harris – junior (5'10, 185)	Linebackers: 3 Brandon Jones – LB – senior (6'4, 225); 5 Justin Norton – OLB – senior (6'2, 190); 11 Jerry Thompson – OLB – senior (6'0, 196); 28 O.J. Davis – LB – sophomore (6'2, 225); 33 Carter Bankston – OLB – sophomore (6'3, 235); 34 Austin Talbert-Loving – OLB – sophomore (6'0, 190); 35 Walter Little – OLB – sophomore (5'11, 200); 36 Forrest Forte – OLB – junior (6'1, 194); 37 Elan Nash – OLB – sophomore (5'11, 196); 38 Rahn Bailey – OLB – sophomore (6'2, 2224); 39 Sion Harrington – LB – sophomore (6'3, 216); 40 Kevin McCoy – OLB – senior (6'4, 222); 41 Tyler Pistorio – LB – sophomore (6'2, 215); 42 Conner Dorris – LB – junior (6'2, 237); 43 Jake Schwarzer – LB – sophomore (6'1, 213); 44 Micah Thomas – LB – senior (6'1, 241); 45 D.J. Palmore – OLB – senior (6'3, 236) (C); 47 Aleksei Yaramus – LB – sophomore (6'2, 218); 48 Dean Sise – freshman (6'2, 205); 49 Monte Armstrong – junior (6'1, 216); 50 Paul Carothers – LB – sophomore (6'1, 220); 51 Winn Howard – LB – Soenior (6'2, 215); 53 Hudson Sullivan – LB – junior (6'2, 240); 54 Taylor Heflin – LB – junior (6'2, 224); 55 Matt Stewart – LB – junior (6'1, 211); 56 Myles Davenport – OLB – senior (6'2, 233); 57 Zack Quilty- OLB – sophomore (6'3, 223); 59 travis Kerchner – LB – junior (6'2, 206); 78 Jacob Gregory – OLB – freshman (6'3, 235); 80 Peyton Long – LB – freshman (6'2, 220); 81 Dallas Jeanty – LB – freshman (5'11, 232); 82 Jack Clancy – LB – freshman (6'1, 216); 83 Griffin Baumoel – LB – freshman (6'2, 220); 84 Pepe Tanuvasa – LB – freshman (6'1, 235); 85 Ian Blake – OLB – freshman (6'2, 215); 86 Mack Schwartz – freshman (6'2, 215); 87 Tanner Matthews – freshman (6'4, 234); Defensive backs: 1 Jake Springer – S – freshman (6'0, 190); 2 Jarid Ryan – S – junior (5'11, 198); 4 Isaac Wright – S – senior (5'10, 186); 6 Sean Williams – S – junior (6'1, 190); 7 Khaylan Williams – CB – junior (6'0, 192); 8 Randy Beggs – S – senior (6'0, 180); 9 Kerrick Jones – DB – freshman (5'11, 170); 10 Marcus Wiggins – DB – freshman (6'4, 180); 13 Juan Hailey – S – senior (6'1, 199); 14 Elijah Merchant – CB – senior (5'10, 196); 15 Noruwa Obanor – CB – sophomore (6'1, 188); 16 Jeremy Griffis – CB – sophomore (5'9, 178); 17 Tyris Wooten – CB – senior (6'1, 185); 18 John Gillis – S – junior (5'11, 179); 22 Michael Onuoha – DB – freshman (6'4, 190); 23 Cameron Kinley – S – freshman (6'2, 185); 24 Mike Cabrera – S – freshman (5'10, 175); 26 Elijah – CB – junior (5'11, 180); 29 Brady Petersen – S – junior (5'10, 190); 31 Myke Brooks – CB – freshman (5'11, 190); 32 Michah Farrer – CB – freshman (6'0, 170) (redshirt); Long snappers: 44 Michael Pifer – sophomore (6'3, 226); 85 Ronnie Querry – senior (6'1, 208); 94 Kyle Gibbs – freshman (6'2, 230)
(C) Team Captain; (S) Suspended; (I) Ineligible; Injured; Redshirt

=== Depth chart ===
Defense

FS
Sean Williams
Juan Hailey
Jarid Ryan

WLB	ILB	ILB	SLB
D.J. Palmore	Micah Thomas	Hudson Sullivan	Tyler Sayles
Kevin McCoy	Brandon Jones	Conner Dorris	Nizaire Cromartie
Myles Davenport	Winn Howard	Taylor Heflin	Josh Webb

SS
Jarid Ryan
Juan Hailey
Jake Springer

CB
Elijah Merchant
Jarid Ryan
Cameron Bryant

DE	NT	DE
Amos Mason	Jackson Pittman	Jarvis Polu
Nnamdi Uzoma	Joshua Van Dunk	Anthony Villalobos
Anthony Villalobos	Dave Tolentino	Vic Thomas

CB
Tyris Wooten
Noruwa Obanor
Juan Hailey

Offense

WR
Tyler Carmona
Craig Scott
Chad Lewellyn

SB
Malcolm Perry
Tre Walker
Jahmaal Daniel

LT	LG	C	RG	RT
Jake Hawk	Robert Lindsey	Parker Wade	Evan Martin	Andrew Wood
Kendel Wright	Laurent Njiki	David Forney	Steve Satchell	Ford Higgins
Michael Raiford	Seth White	Bryan Barrett	T.J. Salu	Michael Railford

SB
Darry Bonner
Josh Brown
John Brown III

WR
Brandon Colon
Terrence Laster
Taylor Jackson

QB
Zach Abey
Garret Lewis
Reggie Hayes

Key reserves

FB
Chris High
Joshua Walker
Myles Benning

Special teams
PK Bennett Moehring & Owen White
P Owen White & Erik Harris
KR Tre Walker & John Brown III
PR Craig Scott & Darryl Bonner

Depth Chart 2017
True Freshman
Double Position : *

== Rankings ==
Ranking movements Legend: ██ Increase in ranking ██ Decrease in ranking — = Not ranked RV = Received votes
	Week															
Poll	Pre	1	2	3	4	5	6	7	8	9	10	11	12	13	14	Final
AP	—	RV	—	—	—	RV	25	RV	—	—	—	—	—	—	—	—
Coaches	—	RV	RV	RV	RV	RV	24	RV	RV	RV	—	—	—	—	—	—
CFP	Not released									—	—	—	—	—	—	Not released

== Game summaries ==
=== At Florida Atlantic ===
Navy at Florida Atlantic

Team	1	2	3	4	Total
• Navy	7	14	14	7	42
Florida Atlantic	3	7	3	6	19

- Date: September 1, 2017
- Location: FAU Stadium, Boca Raton, FL
- Game start: 8:03 pm EST
- Elapsed time: 5 hours 44 minutes (Weather delay – lightning/thunder storm)
- Game attendance: 28,481
- Game weather: Temp: 87 F • Wind: WSW 5 • Weather: partly cloudy
- Referee: Michael Roce
- TV announcers (ESPNU/ESPNews): Kelly Stouffer, Dave LaMont, and Tiffany Greene (sideline)

After a lightning delay, Navy ended the long night with a total of 345 yards. Also, Midshipmen quarterback Zack Abey, making his third start, rushed for 200 yards and passed for 100. This achievement made it the first time in Naval Academy history that a quarter has done so in a single game.

=== Tulane ===
Tulane at Navy

Team	1	2	3	4	Total
Tulane	0	13	0	8	21
• Navy	7	7	9	0	23

- Date: September 9, 2017
- Location: Navy–Marine Corps Memorial Stadium, Annapolis, MD
- Game start: 3:32 pm EST
- Elapsed time: 3 hours 8 minutes
- Game attendance: 30,420
- Game weather: Temp: 71 F • Wind: N 5–10 MPH • Weather: partly cloudy
- Referee: Todd LaPenta
- TV announcers (CBSSN): John Sadak, Randy Cross, and Sheehan Stanwick Burch (sideline)

With this victory, Navy has won their 15th straight regular season win playing at their home stadium. In addition to head coach Ken Niumatalolo's 79th career win at Navy, the most in Naval Academy history.

=== Cincinnati ===
Cincinnati at Navy

Team	1	2	3	4	Total
Cincinnati	7	10	7	8	32
• Navy	14	7	14	7	42

- Date: September 23, 2017
- Location: Navy–Marine Corps Memorial Stadium, Annapolis, MD
- Game start: 3:32 pm EST
- Elapsed time: 3 hours 9 minutes
- Game attendance: 33,134
- Game weather: Temp: 84 F • Wind: NWN 5–10 MPH • Weather: Sunny and clear
- Referee: Charles Lamertina
- TV announcers (CBSSN): John Sadak, Randy Cross, and Sheehan Stanwick Burch (sideline)

With this victory, Navy Midshipmen set a Naval Academy record for 16 consecutive wins at home, making it the longest active regular season streak in the FBS. They also set a new record in Navy football history for the most rushing yards in a single game with 573. (This beat their previous record set on November 10, 2007, at North Texas with 572 yards.)

=== At Tulsa ===
Navy at Tulsa

Team	1	2	3	4	Total
• Navy	0	14	3	14	31
Tulsa	14	0	0	7	21

- Date: September 30, 2017
- Location: H. A. Chapman Stadium, Tulsa, OK
- Game start: 3:30 pm EST
- Elapsed time: 3 hours 15 minutes
- Game attendance: 21,354
- Game weather: Temp: 80 F • Wind: S 7 MPH • Weather: Partly cloudy
- Referee: Michael Roche
- TV announcers (ESPNU): Mark Neely and Ray Bentley

=== Air Force ===
Air Force Falcons (1–3) at Navy Midshipmen (4–0)

Quarter	1	2	3	4	Total
Air Force	7	3	14	21	45
Navy	7	21	10	10	48

at Navy–Marine Corps Memorial Stadium • Annapolis, Maryland

- Date: October 7
- Game time: 3:30 p.m.
- Game weather: Sunny • 83 °F (28 °C) • Wind S 10 miles per hour (16 km/h; 8.7 kn)-15 miles per hour (24 km/h; 13 kn)
- Game attendance: 38,792
- Referee: Brad Van Vark
- TV announcers (CBS Sports Network): Carter Blackburn, Aaron Taylor, and Jenny Dell
- Automated ScoreBook

Game information

Air Force

- Arion Worthman
  9/16, 257 Yds, 2 TD
  20 Rush, 139 Yds, 2 TD
- Marcus Bennett
  5 Rec, 161 Yds, 2 TD

Navy

- Zach Abey
  4/11, 86 Yds, 2 TD
  29 Rush, 214 Yds, 2 TD
- Malcolm Perry
  2 Rec, 45 Yds, TD

With a stadium-record crowd, this victory earned the Midshipmen their best start since they went 5–0 in 2004. Game highlights include, Midshipmen slotback Malcolm Perry had two touchdowns; a 40-yard catch and a 91-yard touchdown run, the second longest TD run in Navy history. While quarterback Zach Abey ran for 214 yards and two touchdowns, rushing for 75 yards on one. Also the Midshipmen rushed for 400-plus yards in three straight games. The last team to do so was Rice with four straight games (1996).

Scoring summary

Quarter	Time	Drive			Team	Scoring information	Score	
Quarter	Time	Plays	Yards	TOP	Team	Scoring information	AFA	NAVY
1	7:52	1	91	0:14	Navy	Malcolm Perry 91-yard touchdown run, Bennett Moehring kick good	0	7
1	5:30	5	77	2:22	Air Force	Marcus Bennett 59-yard touchdown reception from Arion Worthman, Luke Stebel kick good	7	7
2	8:36	10	45	4:58	Navy	Darryl Bonner 10-yard touchdown run, Bennett Moehring kick good	7	14
2	3:45	6	41	3:06	Navy	Zach Abey 1-yard touchdown run, Bennett Moehring kick good	7	21
2	1:52	2	40	0:14	Navy	Malcolm Perry 40-yard touchdown reception from Zach Abey, Bennett Moehring kick good	7	28
2	0:00	11	55	1:52	Air Force	26-yard field goal by Luke Strebel	10	28
3	10:56	8	61	4:04	Navy	21-yard field goal by Bennett Moehring	10	31
3	9:26	4	73	1:30	Air Force	Tim McVey 6-yard touchdown run, Luke Strebel kick good	17	31
3	9:14	1	75	0:12	Navy	Zach Abey 75-yard touchdown run, Bennett Moehring kick good	17	38
3	4:30	11	73	4:44	Air Force	Arion Worthman 1-yard touchdown run, Luke Strebel kick good	24	38
4	11:28	8	89	3:26	Air Force	Arion Worthman 3-yard touchdown run, Luke Strebel kick good	31	38
4	6:08	10	52	5:20	Navy	25-yard field goal by Bennett Moehring	31	41
4	4:09	5	75	1:59	Air Force	Tim McVey 2-yard touchdown run, Luke Strebel kick good	38	41
4	1:53	2	57	0:35	Air Force	Marcus Bennett 51-yard touchdown reception from Arion Worthman, Luke Strebel kick good	45	41
4	0:15	11	75	1:38	Navy	Tyler Carmona 16-yard touchdown reception from Zach Abey, Bennett Moehring kick good	45	48
"TOP" = time of possession. For other American football terms, see Glossary of American football.							45	48

=== At Memphis ===
Navy at Memphis

Team	1	2	3	4	Total
No. 25 Navy	10	0	9	8	27
• Memphis	7	3	10	10	30

- Date: October 14, 2017
- Location: Liberty Bowl Memorial Stadium, Memphis, TN
- Game start: 3:45 pm EST
- Game attendance: 40,177
- Game weather: Temp: • Wind: • Weather:
- Referee: Michael Roche
- TV announcers (ESPNU): Mike Corey and Rene Ingoglia

=== UCF ===
UCF at Navy

Team	1	2	3	4	Total
• No. 20 UCF	7	7	10	7	31
Navy	0	7	7	7	21

- Date: October 21, 2017
- Location: Navy–Marine Corps Memorial Stadium, Annapolis, MD
- Game start: 3:32 pm EST
- Elapsed time: 3 hours 32 minutes
- Game attendance: 35,277
- Game weather: Temp: 71 F • Wind: SE 6 MPH • Weather: Sunny
- Referee: Adam Savoie
- TV announcers (CBSSN): John Sadak, Randy Cross, and Sheehan Stanwick Burch (sideline)

=== At Temple ===
Navy at Temple

Team	1	2	3	4	Total
Navy	3	3	7	13	26
• Temple	10	7	14	3	34

- Date: November 2, 2017
- Location: Lincoln Financial Field, Philadelphia, PA
- Game start: 8:00 pm EST
- Game attendance: 26,127
- Game weather: Temp: • Wind: • Weather:
- Referee: Todd LaPenta
- TV announcers (ESPN): Dave Flemming, Mike Golic, Mike Golic Jr., and Laura Rutledge (sideline)

=== SMU ===
SMU at Navy

Team	1	2	3	4	Total
SMU	5	6	21	8	40
• Navy	13	21	6	3	43

- Date: November 11, 2017
- Location: Navy–Marine Corps Memorial Stadium, Annapolis, MD
- Game start: 3:32 pm EST
- Elapsed time: 3 hours 36 minutes
- Game attendance: 36,157
- Game weather: Temp: 41 F • Wind: NNE 5 MPH • Weather: Clear skies, cold
- Referee: Tracy Jones
- TV announcers (CBSSN): John Sadak, Randy Cross, and Sheehan Stanwick Burch (sideline)

Navy slotback/quarterback Malcolm Perry had a breakout performance in for the injured but active quarterback Zach Abey. Perry rushed for 282 yards with 4 touchdowns in his first start at quarterback (third most in Naval Academy history). Also, fullback Anthony Gargiulo ran for a career-high 145 yards with a touchdown. Backup kicker J.R. Osborn kicked an 18-yard, game-winning field goal as time expired to give the Midshipmen the win in dramatic fashion. With this victory, Navy becomes bowl eligible for the 15th time in the last 16 seasons. It's also Navy's 35th win on Senior Day in the last four years, a milestone few schools have reached.

=== At Notre Dame ===
Navy at Notre Dame

Team	1	2	3	4	Total
Navy	0	10	7	0	17
• No. 9 Notre Dame	3	7	7	7	24

- Date: November 18, 2017
- Location: Notre Dame Stadium, South Bend, IN
- Game start: 3:41 pm EST
- Elapsed time: 2 hours 52 minutes
- Game attendance: 77,622
- Game weather: Temp: 41 F • Wind: N 19 MPH • Weather: Rain
- Referee: Adam Savoie
- TV announcers (NBC): Mike Tirico, Doug Flutie, and Kathryn Tappen (sideline)

=== At Houston ===
Navy at Houston

Team	1	2	3	4	Total
Navy	0	14	0	0	14
• Houston	7	0	7	10	24

- Date: November 24, 2017
- Location: TDECU Stadium, Houston, TX
- Game start: 12:02 pm EST
- Elapsed time: 2 hours 56 minutes
- Game attendance: 29,252
- Game weather: Temp: 67 F • Wind: S 3 MPH • Weather: Clear, sunny
- Referee: Charles Lamertina
- TV announcers (ESPN): Dave LaMont, Mack Brown, and Jen Lada (sideline)

=== Vs. Army ===
Army–Navy Game

Team	1	2	3	4	Total
• Army	7	0	0	7	14
Navy	3	7	3	0	13

- Date: December 9, 2017
- Location: Lincoln Financial Field, Philadelphia, PA
- Game start: 3:14 pm EST
- Elapsed time: 2 hours 56 minutes
- Game attendance: 68,625
- Game weather: Temp: 29 F • Wind: NE 6 MPH • Weather: Snow
- TV announcers (CBS): Brad Nessler, Gary Danielson, and Allie LaForce (sideline)

=== Vs. Virginia (Military Bowl) ===
2017 Military Bowl

Team	1	2	3	4	Total
Virginia	7	0	0	0	7
• Navy	14	14	14	7	49

- Date: December 28, 2017
- Location: Navy-Marine Corps Memorial Stadium, Annapolis, MD
- Game start: 1:33 pm EST
- Elapsed time: 3 hours 19 minutes
- Game attendance: 35,921
- Game weather: Temp: 24 F • Wind: N 10–15 MPH • Weather: Mostly Sunny
- Referee: Dan Romeo
- TV announcers (ESPN/ESPN Radio): Kirk Morrison, Clay Matvick, and Alex Chappell (sideline)/John Brickley and Brad Edwards

With their fourth bowl game victory in five seasons, Navy ran the ball 76 times for 452 rushing yards and scored seven rushing touchdowns. All touchdowns came from quarterbacks Malcolm Perry and Zach Abey. Getting his third start at quarterback, Perry rushed for two touchdowns and led the Midshipmen with 114 rushing yards. Abey came into the game after Perry suffered a foot injury in the third quarter and scored five rushing touchdowns with 88 total yards. Abey became the fifth player in FBS and Military Bowl history to rush for five touchdowns in a FBS bowl game, joining Barry Sanders and Kareem Hunt.
