= Ade Aruna =

Nigerian-born American football player (born 1994)

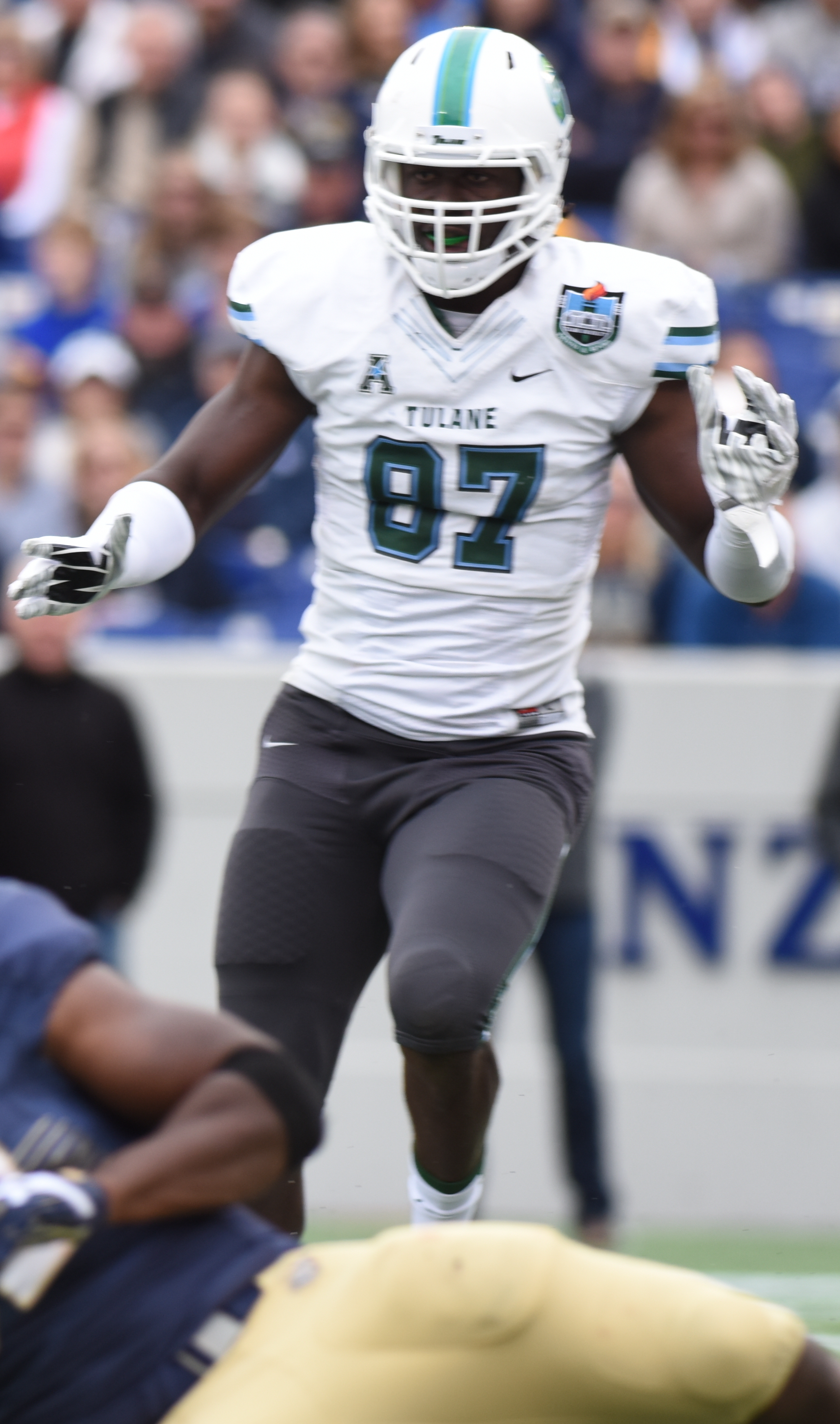
- Aruna with the Tulane Green Wave in 2015

No. 61, 90
- Position: Defensive end

Personal information
- Born: April 27, 1994 (age 32); Akure, Nigeria
- Listed height: 6 ft 5 in (1.96 m)
- Listed weight: 263 lb (119 kg)

Career information
- High school: La Lumiere School (La Porte, Indiana, U.S.)
- College: Tulane
- NFL draft: 2018: 6th round, 218th overall pick

Career history
- Minnesota Vikings (2018–2019); Oakland / Las Vegas Raiders (2019–2020)*; BC Lions (2021–2022)
- * Offseason or practice squad member only
- Stats at Pro Football Reference

Ade Aruna (born April 27, 1994) is a Nigerian former professional American football defensive end. He played college football at Tulane, and was selected by the Minnesota Vikings in the sixth round of the 2018 NFL draft. He has also been a member of the Oakland / Las Vegas Raiders and BC Lions.

== Early life ==
Born in Nigeria, Aruna moved to the United States during his high school years, initially to pursue a career in basketball.

== Professional career ==
=== Minnesota Vikings ===
Aruna was selected by the Minnesota Vikings in the sixth round (218th overall) of the 2018 NFL draft. On August 20, 2018, he was placed on injured reserve after suffering a knee injury in the preseason.

Aruna was waived/injured during final roster cuts on August 31, 2019, and reverted to the team's injured reserve list the next day. He was waived from injured reserve with an injury settlement on September 12.

=== Oakland / Las Vegas Raiders ===
On December 26, 2019, Aruna was signed to the practice squad of the Oakland Raiders. On December 30, 2019, Aruna was signed to a reserve/future contract. On July 27, 2020, he was waived with a non-football injury designation. He was re-signed on August 8, 2020. Aruna was waived once again on August 25, 2020.

=== BC Lions ===
Aruna signed with the BC Lions of the Canadian Football League on April 19, 2021. He was placed on the suspended list on July 2, 2021. He was released on February 14, 2023.
