= 2017 Texas Tech Red Raiders football team =

American college football season

2017 Texas Tech Red Raiders football

Birmingham Bowl, L 34–38 vs. South Florida
- Conference: Big 12 Conference
- Record: 6–7 (3–6 Big 12)
- Head coach: Kliff Kingsbury (5th season)
- Offensive coordinator: Eric Morris (5th season)
- Offensive scheme: Air raid
- Defensive coordinator: David Gibbs (3rd season)
- Base defense: Multiple
- Home stadium: Jones AT&T Stadium

2017 Big 12 Conference football standings
	Conf.			Overall
Team	W		L	W		L
No. 3 Oklahoma y$^	8	–	1	12	–	2
No. 9 TCU y	7	–	2	11	–	3
No. 14 Oklahoma State	6	–	3	10	–	3
Texas	5	–	4	7	–	6
West Virginia	5	–	4	7	–	6
Kansas State	5	–	4	8	–	5
Iowa State	5	–	4	8	–	5
Texas Tech	3	–	6	6	–	7
Baylor	1	–	8	1	–	11
Kansas	0	–	9	1	–	11
Championship: Oklahoma 41, TCU 17
^ – College Football Playoff participant; $ – Conference champion; y – Championship game participant; Rankings from AP Poll

The 2017 Texas Tech Red Raiders football team represented Texas Tech University in the 2017 NCAA Division I FBS football season. Kliff Kingsbury led the Red Raiders in his fifth season as the program's 15th head coach. The Red Raiders played their home games on the university's campus in Lubbock, Texas at Jones AT&T Stadium, and competed as members of the Big 12 Conference. They finished the season 6–7, 3–6 in Big 12 play to finish in eighth place. They were invited to the Birmingham Bowl where they lost to South Florida.

== Personnel ==
2017 Texas Tech Red Raiders football team roster
Players
Coaches
Offense

Pos.	#	Name	Class
OL	70	Zach Adams	Fr
OT	58	Madison Akamnonu	So
OL	56	Jack Anderson	Fr
WR	19	Zach Austin	Sr
WR	13	Cameron Batson (C)	Sr
WR	17	De'Quan Bowman	Jr
WR	8	Tony Brown	So
OL	79	Travis Bruffy	Fr
WR	14	Dylan Cantrell (C)	Sr
QB	6	McLane Carter	So
WR	83	Xavier Castille	Jr
WR	82	Keke Coutee	Jr
OL	73	Dawson Deaton	Fr
QB	7	Jett Duffey	Fr
OL	54	Jajuan Dulaney	Sr
OL	74	Will Farrar	Fr
RB	27	DeMarcus Felton	Jr
QB	12	Colt Garrett	Fr
OL	66	John Gerold	So
WR	88	Ja'Deion High	Sr
OL	77	Jacob Hines	Jr
FB	46	Henry Howard	Fr
WR	82	Hunter Isom	Jr
OL	70	Dwayne Johnson, Jr.	Sr
RB	24	Tre King	Jr
WR	31	Jake Levrier	Fr
WR	3	Xavier Martin	Fr
C	51	Tony Morales	Sr
WR	32	Desmond Nisby	Jr
OL	75	Giovanni Pancotti	Fr
FB	29	Mason Reed	Jr
G	72	Jack Reichel	So
WR	86	Dalton Rigdon	Fr
WR	20	Jojo Robinson	Jr
WR	80	Brandt Schilling	Fr
WR	84	Nate Shelton	Fr
QB	16	Nic Shimonek (C)	Sr
WR	1	Quan Shorts	So
OL	71	Bailey Smith	So
G	76	Paul Stawarz	Jr
OL	64	Peyton Steele	Fr
OT	78	Terence Steele	So
RB	4	Justin Stockton	Sr
QB	10	Payne Sullins	Jr
WR, TE	17	Donta Thompson	So
WR	86	T. J. Vasher	Fr
OL	68	Casey Verhulst	Fr
RB	25	Da'Leon Ward	So
WR	22	Antoine Wesley	So
WR	11	Derrick Willies	Sr
RB	30	Caleb Woodward	Sr

Defense

Pos.	#	Name	Class
DB	12	Quincy Addison	Fr
LB	40	Dakota Allen (C)	Jr
DB	21	Kisean Allen	Jr
LB	42	Matthew Anunda	Fr
DL	52	Zach Barnes	Sr
LB	1	Jordyn Brooks	So
DL	50	Jesse Brown	Jr
DL	45	Aaron Calcote	Fr
DL	93	Tyler Carr	Fr
DB	25	Douglas Coleman III	So
DB	17	John Davis, Jr.	Fr
DB	15	Vaughnte Dorsey	Jr
DB	47	Cade Erwin	So
DB	23	DaMarcus Fields	Fr
DB	20	Adrian Frye	Fr
DB	36	Trey Gentry	Fr
DL	94	Lonzell Gilmore	So
DL	13	Kolin Hill	Jr
DL	53	Eli Howard	So
LB	11	Riko Jeffers	Fr
DB	7	Jah'shawn Johnson (C)	Jr
DL	92	Noah Jones	Fr
DL	9	Tony Jones	Jr
DB	28	Jaylon Lane	Jr
DB	16	Thomas Leggett	So
DL	57	Michael Mays	Jr
DL	91	Nelson Mbanasor	Fr
DL	98	Nick McCann	Fr
DL	89	Houston Miller	Fr
DB	26	Kevin Moore	So
DB	5	Octavious Morgan	Jr
DL	95	Talor Nunez	Sr
DB	31	Justus Parker	So
LB	10	Johnathan Picone	So
DB	3	D.J. Polite-Bray	Sr
DL	59	Zackery Semrak	Fr
DB	4	Desmon Smith	So
LB	33	Brayden Stringer	So
DB	19	Willie Sykes	So
LB	18	Christian Taylor	So
DL	99	Mychealon Thomas	Sr
DB	22	Trevor Walker	Sr
DB	14	Abraham Wallace	Jr
DL	97	Joseph Wallace	So
LB	35	Jamarcus Washington	Fr
DL	96	Broderick Washington Jr.	So
DB	30	Jax Welch	Fr
DL	90	Quentin Yontz	Jr

Special teams

Pos.	#	Name	Class
PK, P	49	Michael Barden	Jr
PK	39	Matthew Cluck	Fr
PK	37	John Delagarza	Fr
PK	87	Michael Ewton	Fr
PK, P	96	Clayton Hatfield	Jr
LS	48	Kyle Heffron	Sr
LS	43	Noah Hess	So
LS	40	Connor Killian	Fr
LS	50	Landan O'Connor	Fr
P	85	Dominic Panazzolo	Jr

Head coach

- Kliff Kingsbury

Coordinators/assistant coaches

- Perry Carter (ADQC)
- David Gibbs
- Lee Hays
- Terrance Jamison
- Emmett Jones
- Jabbar Juluke
- Zach Kittley
  Graduate assistant
- Eric Morris
- Kevin Patrick
- Joe Robinson
- Karl Scott
- Zac Spavital
- Rusty Whitt

Legend

- (C) Team captain
- (S) Suspended
- (I) Ineligible
- Injured
- Redshirt

Roster
Last update: September 9, 2017

== Spring game ==
Texas Tech Spring Game – Game summary

Quarter	1	2	3	4	Total
Red	7	19	22	1	49
Black	3	20	1	7	31

at The Ford Center at The Star, Frisco, TX

- Date: April 1
- Game time: 3:00 p.m.
- Game weather: Played indoors (dome stadium)
- TV announcers (FSSW+): Robert Giovannetti • Chris Level • Taylor Peters

Texas Tech's 2017 spring game was held at the Ford Center at The Star in Frisco, Texas on April 1, 2017. The Red Raiders are the first collegiate football program to hold an event at The Star.

== Schedule ==
Texas Tech announced their 2017 schedule on December 13, 2016. The 2017 schedule consisted of 6 home games, 5 away games, and 1 neutral site game in the regular season. The Red Raiders hosted Big 12 foes Oklahoma State, Iowa State, Kansas State, and TCU and traveled to Kansas, West Virginia, and Texas. Texas Tech played Baylor in Arlington, Texas at AT&T Stadium for the 76th meeting in their rivalry.

The Red Raiders hosted non-conference games against Eastern Washington and Arizona State and traveled to their other non-conference opponent Houston in Houston, Texas.

Date	Time	Opponent	Rank	Site	TV	Result	Attendance
September 2	3:00 p.m.	No. 5 (FCS) Eastern Washington*		Jones AT&T Stadium; Lubbock, TX	FSN	W 56–10	54,988
September 16	7:00 p.m.	Arizona State*		Jones AT&T Stadium; Lubbock, TX	FSN	W 52–45	58,547
September 23	11:00 a.m.	at Houston*		TDECU Stadium; Houston, TX (rivalry)	ABC/ESPN2	W 27–24	36,383
September 30	7:00 p.m.	No. 15 Oklahoma State		Jones AT&T Stadium; Lubbock, TX	FOX	L 34–41	60,901
October 7	11:00 a.m.	at Kansas		Memorial Stadium; Lawrence, KS	FS1	W 65–19	21,050
October 14	11:00 a.m.	at West Virginia	No. 24	Mountaineer Field; Morgantown, WV	ESPNU	L 35–46	60,928
October 21	11:00 a.m.	Iowa State^{†}		Jones AT&T Stadium; Lubbock, TX	FS1	L 13–31	57,045
October 28	7:00 p.m.	at No. 10 Oklahoma		Gaylord Family Oklahoma Memorial Stadium; Norman, OK	ABC/ESPN2	L 27–49	86,309
November 4	11:00 a.m.	Kansas State		Jones AT&T Stadium; Lubbock, TX	FS1	L 35–42 ^{OT}	47,631
November 11	11:00 a.m.	vs. Baylor		AT&T Stadium; Arlington, TX (rivalry)	FSN	W 38–24	34,482
November 18	11:00 a.m.	No. 11 TCU		Jones AT&T Stadium; Lubbock, TX (rivalry)	FS1	L 3–27	51,278
November 24	7:00 p.m.	at Texas		Darrell K Royal–Texas Memorial Stadium; Austin, TX (rivalry)	FOX	W 27–23	100,629
December 23	11:00 a.m.	vs. No. 23 South Florida*		Legion Field; Birmingham, AL (Birmingham Bowl)	ESPN	L 34–38	28,623
*Non-conference game; ^{†}Homecoming; Rankings from AP Poll released prior to game; All times are in Central time

== Season summary ==
=== Eastern Washington ===
Eastern Washington Eagles at Texas Tech Red Raiders – Game summary

Quarter	1	2	3	4	Total
#5 (FCS) Eagles	0	10	0	0	10
Red Raiders	7	21	21	7	56

at Jones AT&T Stadium, Lubbock, TX

- Date: September 2
- Game time: 3:00 p.m.
- Game weather: Temperature: 90 °F (32 °C) • Weather: clear • Wind: NNW 10 MPH
- Game attendance: 54,988
- Referee: C. Castleberry
- TV announcers (FSN): Brendan Burke (play-by-play), Dave Anderson (color), Christian Steckel (reporter)

Game information

First quarter

- TTU – Justin Stockton 25-yard run (Michael Ewton kick), 1:51. Red Raiders 7–0. Drive: 5 plays, 80 yards, 1:32.

Second quarter

- EWU – Roldan Alcobendas 22-yard field goal, 10:32. Red Raiders 7–3. Drive: 16 plays, 71 yards, 6:19.
- TTU – Derrick Willies 75-yard pass from Nic Shimonek (Michael Ewton kick), 10:21. Red Raiders 14–3. Drive: 1 play, 75 yards, 0:11.
- TTU – Keke Coutee 68-yard pass from Nic Shimonek (Michael Ewton kick), 5:54. Red Raiders 21–3. Drive: 3 plays, 68 yards, 1:39.
- EWU – Terrance Grady 22-yard pass from Gage Guburd (Roland Alcobendas kick), 4:07. Red Raiders 21–10. Drive: 5 plays, 75 yards, 1:38.
- TTU – Keke Coutee 17-yard pass from Nic Shimonek (Michael Ewton kick), 0:29. Red Raiders 28–10. Drive: 9 plays, 75 yards, 3:38.

Third quarter

- TTU – Tre King 1-yard run (Michael Ewton kick), 7:17. Red Raiders 35–10. Drive: 10 plays, 81 yards, 4:15.
- TTU – Justin Stockton 4-yard run (Michael Ewton kick), 3:18. Red Raiders 42–10. Drive: 11 plays, 85 yards, 3:10.
- TTU – Willie Sykes 35-yard interception return (Michael Ewton kick), 3:09. Red Raiders 49–10. Drive: 1 play, 35 yards, 0:09.

Fourth quarter

- TTU – Quan Shorts 22-yard pass from McLane Carter (Michael Ewton kick), 12:44. Red Raiders 56–10. Drive: 9 plays, 69 yards, 3:07.

Top passers

- EWU – Gage Gubrud – 22/34, 207 yards, TD, INT
- TTU – Nic Shimonek – 26/30, 384 yards, 3 TD

Top rushers

- EWU – Sam McPherson – 13 carries, 57 yards
- TTU – Desmond Nisby – 6 carries, 57 yards

Top receivers

- EWU – Terrance Grady – 8 receptions, 93 yards, TD
- TTU – Derrick Willies – 4 receptions, 126 yards, TD

The Red Raiders entered the game with quarterback Nic Shimonek making his first career start for Texas Tech after former Tech quarterback Patrick Mahomes II was drafted by the Kansas City Chiefs in the 2017 NFL draft. Shimonek started the game by completing 14 straight passes and exited the game in the 3rd quarter, finishing 26/30 for 384 yards and 3 touchdowns with no interceptions. Red Raider backups McLane Carter and Jett Duffey went 3/3 for 49 yards, 1 touchdown and 2/2 for 16 yards, respectively.

The Red Raiders received the opening kickoff and started at their own 25-yard line, but a delay of game penalty pushed them back to the 20. Shimonek was sacked on 3rd and 7, forcing the Red Raiders to punt on a three and out. The Eagles started at the Texas Tech 39-yard line following the punt, but Nic Sblendorio fumbled the ball and it was recovered by Texas Tech's Douglas Coleman III. The Red Raiders failed to capitalize on the turnover and punted from the Eastern Washington 43-yard line. The two teams traded punts before Tech scored on a Justin Stockton 25-yard run late in the 1st quarter with Michael Ewton making the PAT.

Eastern Washington opened the second quarter by marching down field to the Texas Tech 4-yard line, getting their first score of the day on a 22-yard field goal from Roldan Alcobendas to trail 7–3 with 10:32 left in the first half. The Red Raiders responded to the field goal on their next possession with Shimonek finding Derrick Willies for a 75–yard touchdown reception to lead 14–3 after Ewton's PAT. The Eagle's made it to the Tech 31-yard line and decided to go for it on 4th and 1, but couldn't pick up the first down. After the turnover on downs, Shimonek threw a 68-yard touchdown pass to Keke Coutee to widen their lead to 21–3 following the PAT. The Eagles responded to the touchdown on their next possession with a 22-yard pass from Gage Gubrud to Terrance Grady; with Alcobendas making the PAT Eastern Washington trailed Texas Tech 10–21 with 4:07 left in the half. The Red Raiders would score another touchdown to lead 28–10 at halftime.

Texas Tech scored two offensive touchdowns in the 3rd quarter, one a 1-yard run from Tre King and another one a 4-yard run from Justin Stockton. With 3:09 left in the 3rd quarter, Guburd threw an interception to Willie Sykes who returned it 33-yards for a pick six, extending Tech's lead to 49–10 following Ewton's PAT. Texas Tech backup quarterback McLane Carter entered the game late in the 3rd quarter, ending the drive with a 22-yard touchdown pass Quan Shorts late in the 4th quarter. The Red Raiders ended their next two drives by turning over on downs. The Red Raiders won their season opener 56–10, improving to 5–0 in season openers under head coach Kliff Kingsbury. The Texas Tech defense held Eastern Washington, a team that has won 3 out of its last 5 games against FBS opponents, to only 10 points and 301 total yards while forcing 3 turnovers.

=== Arizona State ===
Arizona State Sun Devils at Texas Tech Red Raiders – Game summary

Quarter	1	2	3	4	Total
Sun Devils	3	14	21	7	45
Red Raiders	21	14	10	7	52

at Jones AT&T Stadium, Lubbock, TX

- Date: September 16
- Game time: 7:00 p.m.
- Game weather: Temperature: 75 °F (24 °C) • Weather: cloudy, chance of rain • Wind: SSW 11 MPH
- Game attendance: 58,547
- Referee: Chris Coyte
- TV announcers (FSN): Mark Followill (play-by-play), Brian Baldinger (color), Lesley McCaslin (reporter)

Game information

First quarter

- ASU – Brandon Ruiz 44-yard field goal, 7:48. Sun Devils 3–0. Drive: 8 plays, 46 yards, 3:14.
- TTU – Keke Coutee 12-yard pass from Nic Shimonek (Clayton Hatfield kick), 4:25. Red Raiders 7–3. Drive: 10 plays, 75 yards, 3:23.
- TTU – Cameron Batson 11-yard pass from Nic Shimonek (Clayton Hatfield kick), 1:48. Red Raiders 14–3. Drive: 3 plays, 72 yards, 0:52.
- TTU – Dylan Cantrell 29-yard pass from Nic Shimonek (Clayton Hatfield kick), 0:04. Red Raiders 21–3. Drive: 3 plays, 22 yards, 1:05.

Second quarter

- ASU – Kyle Williams 3-yard pass from Manny Wilkins (Brandon Ruiz kick), 11:42. Red Raiders 21–10. Drive: 8 plays, 75 yards, 3:22.
- ASU – Denario Richard 1-yard run (Brandon Ruiz kick), 5:34. Red Raiders 21–17. Drive: 9 plays, 80 yards, 3:50.
- TTU – Mason Reed 10-yard pass from Nic Shimonek (Clayton Hatfield kick), 3:31. Red Raiders 28–17. Drive: 5 plays, 75 yards, 2:03.
- TTU – Dylan Cantrell 14-yard pass from Nic Shimonek (Clayton Hatfield kick), 0:30. Red Raiders 35–17. Drive: 4 plays, 27 yards, 0:37.

Third quarter

- ASU – Kalen Ballage 1-yard run (Brandon Ruiz kick), 11:49. Red Raiders 35–24. Drive: 5 plays, 73 yards, 1:27.
- TTU – Derrick Willies 28-yard pass from Nic Shimonek (Michael Barden kick), 9:25. Red Raiders 42–24. Drive: 7 plays, 75 yards, 2:24.
- ASU – Frank Darby 21-yard run (Brandon Ruiz kick), 6:31. Red Raiders 42–31. Drive: 9 plays, 74 yards, 2:54.
- TTU – Michael Barden 39-yard field goal, 3:06. Red Raiders 45–31. Drive: 10 plays, 54 yards, 3:25.
- ASU – Kyle Williams 9-yard pass from Manny Wilkins (Brandon Ruiz kick), 0:37. Red Raiders 45–38. Drive: 9 plays, 79 yards, 2:29.

Fourth quarter

- ASU – N'Keal Harry 21-yard pass from Manny Wilkins (Brandon Ruiz kick), 9:52. Tied 45–45. Drive: 9 plays, 62 yards, 4:10.
- TTU – Dylan Cantrell 3-yard run (Michael Barden kick), 1:55. Red Raiders 52–45. Drive: 12 plays, 90 yards, 4:31.

Top passers

- ASU – Manny Wilkins – 27/41, 326 yards, 3 TD
- TTU – Nic Shimonek – 37/50, 543 yards, 6 TD

Top rushers

- ASU – Kalen Ballage – 16 carries, 56 yards, TD
- TTU – Justin Stockton – 12 carries, 47 yards

Top receivers

- ASU – N'Keal Harry – 13 receptions, 148 yards, TD
- TTU – Keke Coutee – 12 receptions, 186 yards, TD

Kickoff was delayed for an hour due to thunderstorms in the Lubbock area.

The Sun Devils received the opening kickoff, with Michael Barden's kick going out of bounds. Arizona State started at their own 35-yard line, making it all the way to the Texas Tech 23-yard line before the drive stalled out. Brandon Ruiz tried for a 41-yard field goal, but missed. The Red Raiders took over at their own 23, but couldn't pick up a first down and punted the ball. Arizona State made it to the Texas Tech 26-yard line, before bringing out Ruiz for another field goal attempt. This time Ruiz's kick, a 44-yard attempt, was good, giving the Sun Devils a 3–0 lead midway through the 1st quarter. Despite a slow offensive start, Texas Tech scored 21 unanswered points to lead 21–3 at the end of the 1st.

On Arizona State's next offensive position they scored their first touchdown on a 3-yard pass from Manny Wilkins to Kyle Williams. On the drive, Texas Tech's defense committed 4 penalties. The Red Raiders almost scored on their next possession, but Desmond Nisby fumbled the ball just short of the goal line. The Sun Devils scored following the fumble recovery to trail 17–21 with 5:34 left in the half. Following miscues by both the defense and offense on previous drives, the Red Raiders scored on a 10-yard pass from Nic Schimonek to fullback Mason Reed. Texas Tech's defense stopped Arizona State's offense on the following drive, forcing the Sun Devils to punt from their own 38-yard line. On the punt, Michael Sleep-Dalton's punt was blocked by Ja'Deion High, who recovered the ball at the Arizona State 27-yard line. The Red Raiders scored quickly following the blocked punt, extending their lead to 35–17. The first half ended with Wilkins being sacked by Mychealon Thomas for a loss of 11-yards.

Texas Tech's offense struggled in the 3rd quarter, while the defense gave up 3 touchdowns to the Sun Devils. After trailing by 18 at halftime, Arizona State tied the game 45–45 after a 21-yard pass from Wilkins to N'Keal Harry with 9:52 left to play. The two teams traded punts before the Red Raiders retook the lead following receiver Dylan Cantrell's 3-yard touchdown run. On the next possession, Arizona State made it to their own 37-yard line but a false start penalty and Wilkins being sacked by Zach Barnes and Eli Howard pushed the Sun Devils back to their 17-yard line, bringing up 4th and 30. Wilkins tried a deep pass to Harry, but it was incomplete and Arizona State turned the ball over on downs, giving the Red Raiders a 52–45 victory.

=== Houston ===
Texas Tech Red Raiders at Houston Cougars – Game summary

Quarter	1	2	3	4	Total
Red Raiders	6	7	7	7	27
Cougars	0	10	0	14	24

at TDECU Stadium, Houston, TX

- Date: September 23
- Game time: 11:00 a.m.
- Game weather: Temperature: 85 °F (29 °C) • Weather: partly cloudy • Wind: E 8 MPH
- Game attendance: 36,383
- Referee: Brandon Cruse
- TV announcers (ABC/ESPN2): Mike Patrick (play-by-play), Tommy Tuberville (color), Paul Carcaterra (reporter)

Game information

First quarter

- TTU – Michael Ewton 32-yard field goal, 9:57. Red Raiders 3–0. Drive: 8 plays, 17 yards, 4:10.
- TTU – Michael Barden 47-yard field goal, 1:45. Red Raiders 6–0. Drive: 12 plays, 39 yards, 3:17.

Second quarter

- TTU – Desmond Nisby 3-yard run (Michael Ewton kick), 11:08. Red Raiders 13–0. Drive: 11 plays, 86 yards, 4:04.
- HOU – Caden Novikoff 45-yard field goal, 8:26. Red Raiders 13–3. Drive: 7 plays, 26 yards, 2:42.
- HOU – D'Eriq King 18-yard pass from Kyle Allen (Caden Novikoff kick), 4:41. Red Raiders 13–10. Drive: 2 plays, 19 yards, 0:29.

Third quarter

- TTU – Keke Coutee 77-yard pass from Nic Shimonek (Michael Barden kick), 4:48. Red Raiders 20–10. Drive: 2 plays, 80 yards, 0:25.

Fourth quarter

- TTU – Justin Stockton 20-yard pass from Nic Shimonek (Michael Barden kick), 7:28. Red Raiders 27–10. Drive: 2 plays, 94 yards, 1:15.
- HOU – Kyle Postma 9-yard run (Caden Novikoff kick), 4:29. Red Raiders 27–17. Drive: 10 plays, 73 yards, 2:59.
- HOU – Linell Bonner 4-yard pass from Kyle Allen (Caden Novikoff kick), 0:15. Red Raiders 27–24. Drive: 8 plays, 76 yards, 1:27.

Top passers

- TTU – Nic Shimonek – 29/45, 321 yards, 2 TD, INT
- HOU – Kyle Allen 24/39, 217 yards, TD, 2 INT

Top rushers

- TTU – Justin Stockton – 10 carries, 102 yards
- HOU – Kyle Postma – 4 carries, 52 yards, TD

Top receivers

- TTU – Keke Coutee – 11 receptions, 161 yards, TD
- HOU – Steven Dunbar – 6 receptions, 83 yards

Texas Tech closed non–conference play against instate and former Southwest Conference rival Houston.

Houston received the opening kickoff with their first drive ending in a Kyle Allen pass being intercepted by Dakota Allen. Texas Tech scored 3 off of the turnover with Michael Ewton making a 32-yard field goal to give the Red Raiders a 3–0 lead. The Cougars committed a total of 5 turnovers in the game while the Red Raiders only had 1. In a defensive battle, Texas Tech beat Houston 27–24, improving to 3–0 for the first time since 2013. With the victory, the Red Raiders ended the Cougars' 16-game home winning streak.

=== Oklahoma State ===
#15 Oklahoma State Cowboys at Texas Tech Red Raiders – Game summary

Quarter	1	2	3	4	Total
#15 Cowboys	7	14	13	7	41
Red Raiders	7	10	3	14	34

at Jones AT&T Stadium, Lubbock, TX

- Date: September 30
- Game time: 7:00 p.m.
- Game weather: Temperature: 63 °F (17 °C) • Weather: cloudy • Wind: SSE 8 MPH
- Game attendance: 60,901
- Referee: Dan Romeo
- TV announcers (FOX): Gus Johnson (play-by-play), Joel Klatt (color), Jenny Taft (reporter)

Game information

First quarter

- OKST – James Washington 14-yard pass from Mason Rudolph (Matt Ammendola kick), 11:15. Cowboys 7–0. Drive: 7 plays, 68 yards, 1:53.
- TTU – DaMarcus Fields 95-yard interception return (Michael Barden kick), 7:42. Tied 7–7. Drive: 5 plays, 51 yards, 1:44.

Second quarter

- TTU – Dylan Cantrell 3-yard pass from Nic Schimonek (Michael Barden kick), 14:14. Red Raiders 14–7. Drive: 8 plays, 80 yards, 4:16.
- OKST – Justice Hill 5-yard pass from Mason Rudolph (Matt Ammendola kick), 9:41. Tied 14–14. Drive: 11 plays, 75 yards, 4:33.
- OKST – Jalen McCleskey 4-yard pass from Mason Rudolph (Matt Ammendola kick), 3:49. Cowboys 21–14. Drive: 10 plays, 88 yards, 3:13.
- TTU – Michael Barden 24-yard field goal, 0:00. Cowboys 21–17. Drive: 11 plays, 56 yards, 3:49.

Third quarter

- OKST – Mason Rudolph 8-yard run (Matt Ammendola kick), 12:50. Cowboys 28–17. Drive: 8 plays, 75 yards, 2:10.
- OKST – Matt Ammendola 22-yard field goal, 9:40. Cowboys 31–17. Drive: 4 plays, 4 yards, 1:32.
- TTU – Michael Barden 26-yard field goal, 6:18. Cowboys 31–20. Drive: 9 plays, 64 yards, 3:22.
- OKST – Matt Ammendola 27-yard field goal, 2:55. Cowboys 34–20. Drive: 8 plays, 65 yards, 3:23.

Fourth quarter

- TTU – Justin Stockton 1-yard run (Michael Barden kick), 14:53. Cowboys 34–27. Drive: 8 plays, 70 yards, 3:02.
- TTU – Desmond Nisby 1-yard run (Michael Barden kick), 9:56. Tied 34–34. Drive: 7 plays, 51 yards, 2:53.
- OKST – Mason Rudolph 16-yard run (Matt Ammendola kick), 1:12. Cowboys 41–34. Drive: 6 plays, 79 yards, 2:09.

Top passers

- OKST – Mason Rudolph – 27/38, 376 yards, 3 TD, INT
- TTU – Nic Schimonek – 29/46, 330 yards, TD, INT

Top rushers

- OKST – Justice Hill – 30 carries, 164 yards
- TTU – Justin Stockton – 12 carries, 28 yards, TD

Top receivers

- OKST – James Washington – 9 receptions, 127 yards, TD
- TTU – Cameron Batson – 6 receptions, 84 yards

Texas Tech received the opening kickoff, but the drive ended in a Dominic Panazzolo punt from the Red Raiders' 33-yard line. Oklahoma State started at their own 37-yard line before scoring on a 14-yard pass from Mason Rudolph to James Washington to take a 7–0 lead. The Red Raiders punted once again on their next possession with the Cowboys starting at their own 30-yard line. Oklahoma State made it all the way to the Texas Tech 19-yard line before a Rudolph pass was intercepted by DaMarcus Fields and returned 95-yard for a touchdown to tie the game 7–7. Receiving the ball back, the Cowboys made it all the way to the Red Raiders' 5-yard line before the drive stalled out. Matt Ammendola tried for a 22-yard field goal, but the kick failed after hitting the right upright. Following the missed field goal, Texas Tech scored their first offensive touchdown of the game on a 3-yard pass from Nic Schimonek to Dylan Cantrell. The Cowboys scored a touchdown on their next two possessions to lead 21–14 with 3:49 left in the half. To end the first half, Michael Barden made a 24-yard field goal as time expired.

=== Kansas ===
Texas Tech Red Raiders at Kansas Jayhawks – Game summary

Quarter	1	2	3	4	Total
Red Raiders	21	14	13	17	65
Jayhawks	7	3	9	0	19

at Memorial Stadium, Lawrence, KS

- Date: October 7
- Game time: 11:00 a.m.
- Game weather: Temperature: 63 °F (17 °C) • Weather: partly cloudy • Wind: W 13 MPH
- Game attendance: 21,050
- Referee: Eddy Shelton
- TV announcers (FS1): Sean Kelley (play-by-play), Brian Baldinger (color)

Game information

First quarter

- TTU – Justin Stockton 13-yard run (Michael Barden kick), 11:43. Red Raiders 7–0. Drive: 9 plays, 75 yards, 3:17.
- TTU – Desmond Nisby 47-yard run (Michael Barden kick), 8:34. Red Raiders 14–0. Drive: 3 plays, 55 yards, 0:50.
- TTU – Quan Shorts 37-yard pass from Nic Shimonek (Michael Barden kick), 4:59. Red Raiders 21–0. Drive: 3 plays, 58 yards, 1:05.
- KU – Jeremiah Booker 18-yard pass from Peyton Bender (Gabriel Rui kick), 0:19. Red Raiders 21–7. Drive: 6 plays, 28 yards, 1:53.

Second quarter

- TTU – Desmond Nisby 8-yard run (Michael Barden kick), 13:06. Red Raiders 28–7. Drive: 3 plays, 21 yards, 0:38.
- TTU – Desmond Nisby 1-yard run (Michael Barden kick), 5:16. Red Raiders 35–7. Drive: 9 plays, 53 yards, 3:25.
- KU – Gabriel Rui 21-yard field goal, 0:14. Red Raiders 35–10. Drive: 5 plays, 42 yards, 0:31.

Third quarter

- KU – Gabriel Rui 41-yard field goal, 11:07. Red Raiders 35–13. Drive: 10 plays, 42 yards, 3:53.
- KU – Taylor Martin 2-yard run (Two-point conversion failed), 5:49. Red Raiders 35–19. Drive: 7 plays, 74 yards, 2:39.
- TTU – Justus Parker 20-yard fumble return (Michael Barden kick), 3:44. Red Raiders 42–19. Drive: 2 plays, 14 yards, 0:33.
- TTU – Keke Coutee 40-yard pass from Nic Shimonek (Matthew Cluck PAT missed), 1:30. Red Raiders 48–19. Drive: 2 plays, 60 yards, 0:20.

Fourth quarter

- TTU – Desmond Nisby 15-yard run (Matthew Cluck kick), 12:23. Red Raiders 55–19. Drive: 5 plays, 58 yards, 2:00.
- TTU – Matthew Cluck 26-yard field goal, 8:37. Red Raiders 58–19. Drive: 5 plays, 1 yard, 2:30.
- TTU – Derrick Willies 32-yard pass from McLane Carter (Matthew Cluck kick), 3:52. Red Raiders 65–19. Drive: 7 plays, 68 yards, 3:13.

Top passers

- TTU – Nic Shimonek – 19/24, 233 yards, 2 TD, INT
- KU – Peyton Bender – 12/24, 146 yards, TD, INT

Top rushers

- TTU – Justin Stockton – 15 carries, 161 yards, TD
- KU – Khalil Herbert – 10 carries, 65 yards

Top receivers

- TTU – Keke Coutee – 8 receptions, 87 yards, TD
- KU – Steven Sims – 5 receptions, 102 yards

The Red Raiders scored 2 touchdowns in the 1st quarter after the Jayhawks failed to convert on 4th down. During the 3rd quarter, Texas Tech kicker Michael Barden missed his first field goal of the season on a 44-yard attempt.

=== West Virginia ===
#24 Texas Tech Red Raiders at West Virginia Mountaineers – Game summary

Quarter	1	2	3	4	Total
#24 Red Raiders	14	14	7	0	35
Mountaineers	10	7	7	22	46

at Mountaineer Field, Morgantown, WV

- Date: October 14
- Game time: 11:00 a.m. CDT/12:00 p.m. EDT
- Game weather: Temperature: 69 °F (21 °C) • Weather: clear • Wind: SSE 5 MPH
- Game attendance: 60,928
- Referee: Reggie Smith
- TV announcers (ESPNU): Clay Matvick (play-by-play), Kirk Morrison (color)

Game information

First quarter

- TTU – T. J. Vasher 60-yard pass from Nic Shimonek (Michael Barden kick), 12:53. Red Raiders 7–0. Drive: 2 plays, 72 yards, 0:33.
- WVU – David Sills 31-yard pass from Will Grier (Mike Molina kick), 12:07. Tied 7–7. Drive: 3 plays, 75 yards, 0:46.
- TTU – Dylan Cantrell 6-yard pass from Nic Shimonek (Michael Barden kick), 7:58. Red Raiders 14–7. Drive: 10 plays, 63 yards, 4:09.
- WVU – Mike Molina 43-yard field goal, 3:55. Red Raiders 14–10. Drive: 11 plays, 50 yards, 4:03.

Second quarter

- TTU – Keke Coutee 6-yard pass from Nic Shimonek (Michael Barden kick), 10:58. Red Raiders 21–10. Drive: 6 plays, 45 yards, 2:31.
- WVU – Justin Crawford 5-yard run (Mike Molina kick), 7:44. Red Raiders 21–17. Drive: 9 plays, 68 yards, 3:14.
- TTU – T. J. Vasher 53 yard pass from Nic Shimonek (Michael Barden kick), 5:35. Red Raiders 28–17. Drive: 5 plays, 75 yards, 2:09.

Third quarter

- TTU – Tre King 30-yard run (Michael Barden kick), 9:11. Red Raiders 35–17. Drive: 5 plays, 80 yards, 2:05.
- WVU – David Sills 8-yard pass from Will Grier (Mike Molina kick), 5:07. Red Raiders 35–24. Drive: 8 plays, 75 yards, 4:04.

Fourth quarter

- WVU – Ka'Raun White 32-yard pass from Will Grier (Will Grier pass to David Sills V for two-point conversion), 13:03. Red Raiders 35–32. Drive: 5 plays, 66 yards, 1:37.
- WVU – Ka'Raun White 17-yard pass from Will Grier (Mike Molina kick), 9:14. Mountaineers 39–35. Drive: 6 plays, 58 yards, 2:52.
- WVU – David Sills 11-yard pass from Will Grier (Mike Molina kick), 3:23. Mountaineers 46–35. Drive: 7 plays, 45 yards, 3:31.

Top passers

- TTU – Nic Shimonek – 24/39, 323 yards, 4 TD, INT
- WVU – Will Grier – 32/41, 352 yards, 5 TD, INT

Top rushers

- TTU – Justin Stockton – 15 carries, 96 yards
- WVU – Justin Crawford – 14 carries, 47 yards, TD

Top receivers

- TTU – T. J. Vasher – 2 receptions, 113 yards, 2 TD
- WVU – Ka'Raun White – 8 receptions, 114 yards, 2 TD

The Red Raiders entered the game ranked at #24 in the AP Poll, their first ranking since week 11 of the 2013 season. Texas Tech kicker Michael Barden missed 3 field goals during the game: from 43, 23, and 37 yards.

=== Iowa State ===
Iowa State Cyclones at Texas Tech Red Raiders – Game summary

Quarter	1	2	3	4	Total
Cyclones	7	17	0	7	31
Red Raiders	6	0	7	0	13

at Jones AT&T Stadium, Lubbock, TX

- Date: October 21
- Game time: 11:00 a.m.
- Game weather: Temperature: 66 °F (19 °C) • Weather: partly cloudy • Wind: SSW 13 MPH
- Game attendance: 57,045
- Referee: C. Castlebrry
- TV announcers (FS1): Aaron Goldsmith (play-by-play), Danny Kanell (color), A. J. Hawk (reporter)

Game information

First quarter

- TTU – Desmond Nisby 4-yard run (Michael Ewton PAT missed), 12:36. Red Raiders 6–0. Drive: 3 plays, 7 yards, 1:08.
- ISU – Allen Lazard 13-yard pass from Kyle Kempt (Garrett Owens kick), 6:26. Cyclones 7–6. Drive: 14 plays, 75 yards, 6:10.

Second quarter

- ISU – Garrett Owens 22-yard field goal, 12:22. Cyclones 10–6. Drive: 6 plays, 30 yards, 2:18.
- ISU – Matthew Eaton 4-yard pass from Kyle Kempt (Garrett Owens kick), 10:40. Cyclones 17–6. Drive: 4 plays, 25 yards, 1:34.
- ISU – Matthew Eaton 3-yard pass from Kyle Kempt (Garrett Owens kick), 0:26. Cyclones 24–6. Drive: 10 plays, 80 yards, 3:52.

Third quarter

- TTU – Nic Schimonek 2-yard run (Michael Barden kick), 5:31. Cyclones 24–13. Drive: 12 plays, 77 yards, 3:53.

Fourth quarter

- ISU – Marcel Spears Jr. 61-yard interception return (Garrett Owens kick), 9:07. Cyclones 31–13. Drive: 7 plays, 47 yards, 1:49.

Top passers

- ISU – Kyle Kempt – 22/32, 192 yards, 3 TD, INT
- TTU – Nic Schimonek – 31/41, 207 yards, INT

Top rushers

- ISU – David Montgomery – 28 carries, 164 yards
- TTU – Tre King – 20 carries, 82 yards

Top receivers

- ISU – Marchie Murdock – 4 receptions, 68 yards
- TTU – Keke Coutee – 8 receptions, 72 yards

The kicking problems continued for Texas Tech with the Red Raiders using 3 different kickers throughout the game. Michael Ewton missed an extra point; Matthew Cluck missed a 35-yard field goal; and Michael Barden made an extra point.

=== Oklahoma ===
Texas Tech Red Raiders at #10 Oklahoma Sooners – Game summary

Quarter	1	2	3	4	Total
Red Raiders	20	0	7	0	27
#10 Sooners	14	14	21	0	49

at Gaylord Family Oklahoma Memorial Stadium, Norman, OK

- Date: October 28
- Game time: 7:00 p.m.
- Game weather: Temperature: 49 °F (9 °C) • Weather: clear • Wind: SW 6 MPH
- Game attendance: 86,309
- Referee: Brad Van Vark
- TV announcers (ABC/ESPN2): Steve Levy (play-by-play), Brian Griese (analyst), Todd McShay (reporter)

Game information

First quarter

- TTU – Cameron Batson 9-yard pass from Nic Schimonek (Michael Barden PAT missed), 8:41. Red Raiders 6–0. Drive: 15 plays, 75 yards, 6:19.
- OKLA – CeeDee Lamb 24-yard pass from Baker Mayfield (Austin Seibert kick), 7:08. Sooners 7–6. Drive: 6 plays, 76 yards, 1:33.
- TTU – Keke Coutee 70-yard pass from Nic Schimonek (Michael Barden kick), 6:35. Red Raiders 13–7. Drive: 2 plays, 82 yards, 0:33.
- OKLA – Dimitri Flowers 1-yard run (Austin Seibert kick), 4:31. Sooners 14–13. Drive: 6 plays, 75 yards, 2:04.
- TTU – Dylan Cantrell 42-yard pass from Nic Schimonek (Michael Barden kick), 2:41. Red Raiders 20–14. Drive: 4 plays, 69 yards, 1:50.

Second quarter

- OKLA – Marquise Brown 3-yard pass from Baker Mayfield (Austin Seibert kick), 13:45. Sooners 21–20. Drive: 10 plays, 75 yards, 3:56.
- OKLA – Rodney Anderson 5-yard run (Austin Seibert kick), 7:04. Sooners 28–20. Drive: 4 plays, 54 yards, 1:42.

Third quarter

- OKLA – Baker Mayfield 1-yard run (Austin Seibert kick), 13:48. Sooners 35–20. Drive: 6 plays, 75 yards, 1:12.
- TTU – Cameron Batson 9-yard pass from Nic Schimonek (Michael Barden kick), 12:10. Sooners 35–27. Drive: 6 plays, 75 yards, 1:38.
- OKLA – Mark Andrews 7-yard pass from Baker Mayfield (Austin Seibert kick), 10:24. Sooners 42–27. Drive: 8 plays, 67 yards, 1:46.
- OKLA – CeeDee Lamb 14-yard pass from Baker Mayfield (Austin Seibert kick), 1:41. Sooners 49–27. Drive: 9 plays, 77 yards, 3:40.

Fourth quarter

- No scoring plays

Top passers

- TTU – Nic Schimonek – 22/36, 322 yards, 4 TD, INT
- OKLA – Baker Mayfield – 22/34, 281 yards, 4 TD, INT

Top rushers

- TTU – Tre King – 24 carries, 113 yards
- OKLA – Rodney Anderson – 24 carries, 181 yards, TD

Top receivers

- TTU – T. J. Vasher – 5 receptions, 98 yards
- OKLA – CeeDee Lamb – 9 receptions, 147 yards, 2 TD

=== Kansas State ===
Kansas State Wildcats at Texas Tech Red Raiders – Game summary

Quarter	1	2	3	4	OT	Total
Wildcats	3	14	7	11	7	42
Red Raiders	0	14	14	7	0	35

at Jones AT&T Stadium, Lubbock, TX

- Date: November 4
- Game time: 11:00 a.m.
- Game weather: Temperature: 60 °F (16 °C) • Wind: W 9 MPH • Weather: partly cloudy
- Game attendance: 47,631
- Referee: Scott Campbell
- TV announcers (FS1): Kevin Fitzgerald and Evan Moore

Game information

First quarter

- KSU – Matt McCrane 45-yard field goal, 9:22. Wildcats 3–0. Drive: 11 plays, 51 yards, 5:38.

Second quarter

- KSU – Dalvin Warmack 15-yard run (Matthew McCrane kick), 12:18. Wildcats 10–0. Drive: 7 plays, 98 yards, 4:00.
- TTU – Tre King 25-yard run (Clayton Hatfield kick), 9:40. Wildcats 10–7. Drive: 8 plays, 75 yards, 2:38.
- KSU – Byron Pringle 19-yard pass from Alex Delton (Matthew McCrane kick), 7:36. Wildcats 17–7. Drive: 4 plays, 59 yards, 2:04.
- TTU – Keke Coutee 75-yard pass from Nic Shimonek (Clayton Hatfield kick), 7:26. Wildcats 17–14. Drive: 1 play, 75 yards, 0:10.

Third quarter

- TTU – Keke Coutee 34-yard pass from Nic Shimonek (Clayton Hatfield kick), 12:59. Red Raiders 21–17. Drive: 10 plays, 75 yards, 2:01.
- KSU – Duke Shelley 25-yard interception return (Matthew McCrane kick), 11:32. Wildcats 24–21. Drive: 2 plays, 4 yards, 0:36.
- TTU – Dylan Cantrell 1-yard pass from Nic Schimonek (Clayton Hatfield kick), 5:00. Red Raiders 28–24. Drive: 15 plays, 75 yards, 6:32.

Fourth quarter

- TTU – T. J. Vasher 22-yard pass from Nic Shimonek (Clayton Hatfield kick), 14:10. Red Raiders 35–24. Drive: 12 plays, 80 yards, 3:54.
- KSU – Matt McCrane 30-yard field goal, 9:10. Red Raiders 35–27. Drive: 10 plays, 53 yards, 5:00.
- KSU – Skylar Thompson 1-yard run (Skylar Thompson pass to Dalton Schoen for two-point conversion), 0:42. Tied 35–35. Drive: 5 plays, 80 yards, 2:58.

Overtime

- KSU – Byron Pringle 8-yard pass from Skylar Thompson (Matthew McCrane kick). Wildcats 42–35. Drive: 5 plays, 25 yards.

Top passers

- KSU – Alex Delton – 13/20, 167 yards, TD, INT
- TTU – Nic Schimonek – 34/53, 405 yards, 4 TD, INT

Top rushers

- KSU – Justin Silmon – 2 carries, 45 yards
- TTU – Tre King – 16 carries, 71 yards, TD

Top receivers

- KSU – Dalton Schoen – 5 receptions, 103 yards
- TTU – Keke Coutee – 12 receptions, 189 yards, 2 TD

=== Baylor ===
Baylor Bears vs. Texas Tech Red Raiders – Game summary

Quarter	1	2	3	4	Total
Red Raiders	14	7	10	7	38
Bears	7	0	7	10	24

at AT&T Stadium, Arlington, TX

- Date: November 11
- Game time: 11:00 a.m.
- Game weather: Played indoors (retractable roof closed)
- Game attendance: 34,482
- Referee: Brandon Cruse
- TV announcers (FSN): Mark Followill, Brian Baldinger and Lesley McCaslin

Game information

First quarter

- TTU – Keke Coutee 92-yard kickoff return (Clayton Hatfield kick), 14:46. Red Raiders 7–0. Drive: 0 plays, 92 yards, 0:14.
- BAY – Gavin Holmes 4-yard pass from Charlie Brewer (Connor Martin kick), 10:28. Tied 7–7. Drive: 12 plays, 75 yards, 4:18.
- TTU – Tre King 1-yard run (Clayton Hatfield kick), 8:14. Red Raiders 14–7. Drive: 7 plays, 53 yards, 2:14.

Second quarter

- TTU – T. J. Vasher 5-yard pass from Nic Shimonek (Clayton Hatfield kick), 12:11. Red Raiders 21–7. Drive: 16 plays, 89 yards, 6:27.

Third quarter

- TTU – Clayton Hatfield 39-yard field goal, 4:42. Red Raiders 24–7. Drive: 5 plays, 14 yards, 1:57.
- BAY – Pooh Stricklin 6-yard pass from Charlie Brewer (Connor Martin kick), 1:08. Red Raiders 24–14. Drive: 10 plays, 75 yards, 3:34.
- TTU – Cameron Batson 30-yard pass from Nic Shimonek (Clayton Hatfield kick), 0:44. Red Raiders 31–14. Drive: 2 plays, 32 yards, 0:24.

Fourth quarter

- BAY – Connor Martin 34-yard field goal, 7:57. Red Raiders 31–17. Drive: 10 plays, 64 yards, 2:42.
- TTU – David Coleman III 31-yard fumble return (Clayton Hatfield kick), 5:25. Red Raiders 38–17. Drive: 1 play, -2 yards, 2:32.
- BAY – Denzel Mims 3-yard pass from Charlie Brewer (Connor Martin kick), 1:33. Red Raiders 38–24. Drive: 13 plays, 80 yards, 3:52.

Top passers

- TTU – Nic Schimonek – 24/29, 246 yards, 2 TD
- BAY – Charlie Brewer – 43/63, 417 yards, 3 TD, INT

Top rushers

- TTU – Tre King – 20 carries, 67 yards, TD
- BAY – JaMycal Hasty – 13 carries, 73 yards

Top receivers

- TTU – Dylan Cantrell – 11 receptions, 94 yards
- BAY – Denzel Mims – 12 receptions, 152 yards, TD

Texas Tech received the opening kickoff, with receiver Keke Coutee returning it 92 yards for a touchdown. Baylor responded on the next drive with Charlie Brewer finding Gavin Holmes for a 4-yard touchdown pass. On the ensuing kickoff, Quentin Yontz returned Jay Sedwick's kick for 22 yards to the Texas Tech 47-yard line. The Red Raiders ended the drive on a 1-yard touchdown run from Tre King. The two teams traded punts on their next drives. After the Texas Tech punt, Baylor started at their own 35-yard line. The Bears made it to the Texas Tech 9-yard line when Brewer fumbled the ball with Dakota Allen recovering it for the Red Raiders. Texas Tech scored a touchdown following the Baylor fumble on a 5-yard pass from Nic Shimonek to T. J. Vasher. Baylor turned the ball over on downs on their next possession at the Texas Tech 1-yard line. The Red Raiders only made it to their own 31-yard line before having to punt. The Bears made it back to the redzone, but Brewer's pass was intercepted in the endzone by Vaughnte Dorsey. Texas Tech took a knee to end the first half with a 21–7 lead.

Baylor received the second half kickoff before going three-and-out and punted from their own 29-yard line. Texas Tech made it to the Baylor 1-yard line before Tre King fumbled with the ball being recovered by Jordan Williams for Baylor. The Bears turned the ball over on the next drive when Brewer was sacked at the Baylor 35-yard line and fumbled the ball; Mychealon Thomas recovered the ball at the Baylor 21-yard line. The Red Raiders scored 3 points off of the turnover with a 39-yard field goal from Clayton Hatfield. Baylor scored a touchdown on their next drive with a 6-yard pass from Brewer to Pooh Stricklin. On the following kickoff, the Bears attempted an onside kick that was recovered by Texas Tech at the Baylor 47-yard line. The Red Raiders started the drive at the Baylor 32-yard line after a catching interference penalty against Baylor. Texas Tech scored quickly with Shimonek throwing a 30-yard touchdown pass to Cameron Batson. Baylor started their next drive at their own 25-yard line. The Bears made it to the Texas Tech 40-yard line, but turned the ball over on downs after Brewer threw 4 incomplete passes in a row. Baylor attempted their first field goal attempt midway through the 4th quarter with Connor Martin making a 34-yard field goal. The Bears fumbled for a third time in the 4th quarter, with David Coleman III recovering it for the Red Raiders and returned it 31 yards for a touchdown. Following the fumble touchdown, Baylor answered back on their next drive with a 3-yard pass from Brewer to Denzel Mims. The Bears attempted another onside kick, with the Red Raiders recovering it at their own 49-yard line. Texas Tech ran the ball to end the game with a 38–24 victory.

The Red Raiders extended their win streak against the Bears to 2 games and snapped a four-game losing streak on the season. Texas Tech scored 17 points off of turnovers and forced four turnovers: one interception and three fumbles.

=== TCU ===
#11 TCU Horned Frogs at Texas Tech Red Raiders – Game summary

Quarter	1	2	3	4	Total
#11 Horned Frogs	0	10	7	10	27
Red Raiders	3	0	0	0	3

at Jones AT&T Stadium, Lubbock, TX

- Date: November 18
- Game time: 11:00 a.m.
- Game weather: Temperature: 52 °F (11 °C) • Wind: N 28 MPH • Weather: partly cloudy, windy
- Game attendance: 51,278
- Referee: C. Castleberry
- TV announcers (FS1): Brian Custer and Ben Leber

Game information

First quarter

- TTU – Clayton Hatfield 22-yard field goal, 6:08. Red Raiders 3–0. Drive: 21 plays, 70 yards, 8:52.

Second quarter

- TCU – KaVontae Turpin 2-yard run (Cole Bunce kick), 14:52. Horned Frogs 7–3. Drive: 10 plays, 63 yards, 6:14.
- TCU – Cole Bunce 43-yard field goal, 1:14. Horned Frogs 10–3. Drive: 6 plays, 18 yards, 2:40.

Third quarter

- TCU – Jalen Reagor 12-yard pass from Shawn Robinson (Cole Bunce kick), 1:55. Horned Frogs 17–3. Drive: 8 plays, 80 yards, 4:00.

Fourth quarter

- TCU – Cole Bunce 25-yard field goal, 7:01. Horned Frogs 20–3. Drive: 12 plays, 78 yards, 6:49.
- TCU – Jeff Gladney fumble recovery in end zone (Cole Bunce kick), 4:39. Horned Frogs 27–3. Drive: 7 plays, 51 yards, 2:22.

Top passers

- TCU – Shawn Robinson – 6/17, 85 yards, TD
- TTU – Nic Shimonek – 17/33, 137 yards, INT

Top rushers

- TCU – Shawn Robinson – 10 carries, 84 yards
- TTU – Justin Stockton – 21 carries, 124 yards

Top receivers

- TCU – Sewo Olonilua – 1 reception, 28 yards
- TTU – Dylan Cantrell – 7 receptions, 55 yards

The Red Raiders' only score of the game came during the first quarter on a 22-yard field goal from Clayton Hatfield. The drive went on for 21 plays, the longest drive of the season in all of college football by snap count. Hatfield later missed a 20-yard field goal that went nowhere near the goal post, going far wide left.

The Saddle Trophy was re-introduced for the rivalry after being absent for 46 years.

=== Texas ===
Texas Tech Red Raiders at Texas Longhorns – Game summary

Quarter	1	2	3	4	Total
Red Raiders	7	3	3	14	27
Longhorns	7	13	0	3	23

at Darrell K Royal–Texas Memorial Stadium, Austin, TX

- Date: November 24
- Game time: 7:00 p.m.
- Game weather: Temperature: 68 °F (20 °C) • Wind: S 5 MPH • Weather: clear skies; 35% humidity
- Game attendance: 100,629
- Referee: Mike Defee
- TV announcers (FOX): Tim Brando, Spencer Tillman and Holly Sonders

Game information

First quarter

- TEX – Armanti Foreman 27-yard pass from Sam Ehlinger (Joshua Rowland kick), 13:29. Longhorns 7–0. Drive: 4 plays, 75 yards, 1:31.
- TTU – McLane Carter 1-yard run (Clayton Hatfield kick), 3:20. Tied 7–7. Drive: 7 plays, 81 yards, 2:17.

Second quarter

- TTU – Clayton Hatfield 32-yard field goal, 14:49. Red Raiders 10–7. Drive: 8 plays, 74 yards, 2:08.
- TEX – Joshua Rowland 20-yard field goal, 8:07. Tied 10–10. Drive: 14 plays, 37 yards, 4:36.
- TEX – Daniel Young 9-yard run (Joshua Rowland kick), 6:41. Longhorns 17–10. Drive: 1 play, 9 yards, 0:06.
- TEX – Joshua Rowland 19-yard field goal, 0:09. Longhorns 20–10. Drive: 5 plays, 18 yards, 0:39.

Third quarter

- TTU – Clayton Hatfield 34-yard field goal, 10:06. Longhorns 20–13. Drive: 11 plays, 59 yards, 4:54.

Fourth quarter

- TEX – Joshua Rowland 40-yard field goal, 14:23. Longhorns 23–13. Drive: 13 plays, 48 yards, 3:50.
- TTU – T. J. Vasher 13-yard pass from Nic Shimonek (Clayton Hatfield kick), 11:29. Longhorns 23–20. Drive: 6 plays, 75 yards, 2:54.
- TTU – Cameron Batson 16-yard pass from Nic Shimonek (Clayton Hatfield kick), 1:47. Red Raiders 27–23. Drive: 2 plays, 14 yards, 0:19.

Top passers

- TTU – McLane Carter – 16/37, 237 yards, 2 INT
- TEX – Sam Ehlinger – 26/47, 239 yards, TD, 2 INT

Top rushers

- TTU – Justin Stockton – 7 carries, 45 yards
- TEX – Daniel Young – 13 carries, 55 yards, TD

Top receivers

- TTU – Keke Coutee – 9 receptions, 168 yards
- TEX – Armanti Foreman – 5 receptions, 78 yards, TD

McLane Carter started at quarterback for the Red Raiders. Carter went 11/16 for 175 yards in the 1st quarter, but only completed one pass in the 2nd quarter. Carter was pulled in the 4th quarter, finishing 16/37 for 237 yards with 2 interceptions and one rushing touchdown. Nic Shimonek came in at quarterback with his first pass going 52 yards to Keke Coutee. Shimonek's second pass was a 13-yard touchdown reception to T. J. Vasher. Shimonek finished 4/8 for 96 yards with 2 touchdowns. After trailing 10–20 at halftime, the Red Raiders staged a comeback for a 27–23 victory over the Longhorns.

=== South Florida (Birmingham Bowl) ===
Texas Tech Red Raiders vs South Florida Bulls (Birmingham Bowl) – Game summary

Quarter	1	2	3	4	Total
Red Raiders	10	0	14	10	34
#23 Bulls	3	7	7	21	38

at Legion Field, Birmingham, AL

- Date: December 23
- Game time: 11:00 a.m.
- Game weather: Temperature: 60 °F (16 °C) • Weather: rainy • Wind: 15 MPH
- Game attendance: 28,623
- Referee: Ron Hudson
- TV announcers (ESPN): Tom Hart, Gene Chizik and Lauren Sisler

Game information

First quarter

- TTU – Clayton Hatfield 26-yard field goal, 10:47. Red Raiders 3–0. Drive: 12 plays, 67 yards, 4:13.
- USF – Emilio Nadelman 25-yard field goal, 7:12. Tied 3–3. Drive: 11 plays, 58 yards, 3:35.
- TTU – Keke Coutee 5-yard pass from Nic Shimonek (Clayton Hatfield kick), 0:34. Red Raiders 10–3. Drive: 10 plays, 81 yards, 3:48.

Second quarter

- USF – Tyre McCants 21-yard pass from Quinton Flowers (Emilio Nadelman kick), 0:51. Tied 10–10. Drive: 2 plays, 25 yards, 0:24.

Third quarter

- TTU – Dylan Cantrell 3-yard pass from Nic Shimonek (Clayton Hatfield kick), 11:25. Red Raiders 17–10. Drive: 6 plays, 28 yards, 2:57.
- USF – Darnell Salomon 17-yard pass from Quinton Flowers (Emilio Nadelman kick), 8:34. Tied 17–17. Drive: 9 plays, 91 yards, 2:51.
- TTU – Tre King 4-yard run (Clayton Hatfield kick), 5:55. Red Raiders 24–17. Drive: 4 plays, 40 yards, 1:45.

Fourth quarter

- USF – Quinton Flowers 5-yard run (Emilio Nadelman kick), 9:30. Tied 24–24. Drive: 9 plays, 43 yards, 3:07.
- TTU – Clayton Hatfield 33-yard field goal, 5:02. Red Raiders 27–24. Drive: 13 plays, 60 yards, 4:28.
- USF – Marquez Valdes-Scantling 64-yard pass from Quinton Flowers (Emilio Nadelman kick), 4:26. Bulls 31–27. Drive: 2 plays, 65 yards, 0:36.
- TTU – T. J. Vasher 25-yard pass from Nic Shimonek (Clayton Hatfield kick), 1:31. Red Raiders 34–31. Drive: 8 plays, 85 yards, 2:55.
- USF – Tyre McCants 26-yard pass from Quinton Flowers (Emilio Nadelman kick), 0:16. Bulls 38–34. Drive: 7 plays, 75 yards, 1:15.

Top passers

- TTU – Nic Shimonek – 32/59, 416 yards, 3 TD, 2 INT
- USF – Quinton Flowers – 17/34, 311 yards, 4 TD

Top rushers

- TTU – Justin Stockon – 18 carries, 103 yards
- USF – Quinton Flowers – 14 carries, 106 yards, TD

Top receivers

- TTU – Keke Coutee – 11 receptions, 187 yards, TD
- USF – Marquez Valdes-Scantling – 3 receptions, 133 yards, TD

== Statistics ==
=== Scoring ===
Scores against all opponents

	1	2	3	4	OT	Total
Opponents	58	113	92	88	7	358
Texas Tech	119	101	99	66	0	385

Scores against the Big 12

	1	2	3	4	OT	Total
Opponents	62	92	71	70	7	302
Texas Tech	92	62	64	59	0	277

=== Offense ===
Passing statistics
#	POS	NAME	RAT	CMP	ATT	YDS	AVG	CMP%	TD	INT	LONG	Ref
16	QB	Nic Shimonek	152.1	328	493	3,963	8.04	66.5	33	10	77	
6	QB	McLane Carter	121.2	23	46	359	7.8	50.0	2	2	51	
7	QB	Jett Duffey	167.2	2	2	16	8.0	100.0	0	0	13	
		TOTALS	152.7	321	482	3,992	8.14	66.6	32	10	77	

Rushing statistics
#	POS	NAME	CAR	YDS	AVG	LONG	TD	Ref
4	RB	Justin Stockton	132	797	8.3	84	4	
24	RB	Tre King	131	623	4.8	73	5	
32	WR	Desmond Nisby	62	273	4.4	47	7	
27	RB	DeMarcus Felton	22	102	4.6	53	1	
13	WR	Cameron Batson	6	38	6.3	19	0	
29	FB	Mason Reed	5	11	3.6	7	0	
1	WR	Quan Shorts	2	19	9.5	14	0	
82	WR	Keke Coutee	5	15	3.0	11	0	
85	P	Dominic Panazzolo	1	13	13.0	13	0	
7	QB	Jett Duffey	4	6	1.5	12	0	
30	RB	Caleb Woodward	1	5	5.0	5	0	
14	WR	Dylan Cantrell	1	3	3.0	3	1	
6	QB	McLane Carter	15	0	0.0	12	1	
11	WR	Derrick Willies	1	0	0.0	0	0	
16	QB	Nic Shimonek	59	-66	-1.1	16	1	
		TOTALS	459	1,832	4.0	84	19	

Receiving statistics
#	POS	NAME	REC	YDS	AVG	LONG	TD	Ref
		TOTALS	353	4,338	12.3	77	35	

=== Special teams ===
Kicking statistics
#	Name	FGM	FGA	PCT	1–19	20–29	30–39	40–49	50+	LNG	XPM	XPA	PTS	Ref
96	Clayton Hatfield	6	10	60.0	0/0	2/3	4/5	0/2	0/0	39	22	22	40	
49	Michael Barden	4	8	50.0	0/0	2/3	1/2	1/3	0/0	47	23	24	35	
87	Michael Ewton	1	3	33.3	0/0	0/0	1/3	0/0	0/0	32	9	10	12	
39	Matthew Cluck	1	2	50.0	0/0	1/1	0/1	0/0	0/0	26	2	3	5	

== Weekly awards ==
- Earl Campbell Tyler Rose Player of the Week

Nic Shimonek (week 3 vs. Arizona State)

- Big 12 Defensive Player of the Week

Dakota Allen (week 4 vs. Houston)

- Big 12 Special Teams Player of the Week

Ja'Deion High (week 3 vs. Arizona State)

- Big 12 Newcomer of the Week

DaMarcus Fields (week 5 vs. Oklahoma State)
Desmond Nisby (week 6 vs. Kansas)

== Rankings ==
Ranking movements Legend: ██ Increase in ranking ██ Decrease in ranking — = Not ranked RV = Received votes
	Week																
Poll	Pre	1	2	3	4	5	6	7	8	9	10	11	12	13	14	15	Final
AP	—	RV	RV	RV	RV	RV	24	RV	—	—	—	—	—	—	—	—	—
Coaches	—	—	—	—	RV	—	RV	—	—	—	—	—	—	—	—	—	—
CFP	Not released									—	—	—	—	—	—	—	Not released
