= 2017 Birmingham Bowl =

- 12th Birmingham Bowl
Texas Tech Red Raiders	South Florida Bulls
(6–6)	(9–2)
Big 12	The American
34	38
Head coach: Kliff Kingsbury	Head coach: Charlie Strong
	AP / Coaches; 23 / 24
	1	2	3	4	Total
Texas Tech	10	0	14	10	34
South Florida	3	7	7	21	38
- Date: December 23, 2017
- Season: 2017
- Stadium: Legion Field
- Location: Birmingham, Alabama
- MVP: Quinton Flowers
- Referee: Ron Hudson (MAC)
- Attendance: 28,623
- Payout: US$2,025,000

United States TV coverage
- Network: ESPN
- Announcers: Tom Hart, Gene Chizik, Lauren Sisler

The 2017 Birmingham Bowl was a college football bowl game played on December 23, 2017, at Legion Field in Birmingham, Alabama, United States. The twelfth edition of the Birmingham Bowl featured the Texas Tech Red Raiders of the Big 12 Conference against the South Florida Bulls of the American Athletic Conference. Kickoff was scheduled for 11:00 a.m. CST and the game aired on ESPN. It was one of the 2017–18 bowl games concluding the 2017 FBS football season.

== Teams ==
The game featured the Texas Tech Red Raiders against the South Florida Bulls and was the first-ever meeting between the two schools.

=== Texas Tech Red Raiders ===
This was the Red Raiders' first Birmingham Bowl.

=== South Florida Bulls ===
South Florida entered the game as the defending Birmingham Bowl champion, their 2016 team having defeated the South Carolina Gamecocks, 46–39 in overtime. This was the Bulls' third Birmingham Bowl; in addition to their 2016 victory, the 2006 Bulls defeated the East Carolina Pirates, 24–7 in the inaugural game when it was known as the PapaJohns.com Bowl.

== Game summary ==
=== Scoring Summary ===
Scoring summary

Quarter	Time	Drive			Team	Scoring information	Score	
Quarter	Time	Plays	Yards	TOP	Team	Scoring information	TTU	USF
1	10:47	12	67	4:13	TTU	26-yard field goal by Clayton Hatfield	3	0
1	7:12	11	58	3:35	USF	25-yard field goal by Emilio Nadelman	3	3
1	0:34	10	81	3:48	TTU	Keke Coutee 5-yard touchdown reception from Nic Shimonek, Clayton Hatfield kick good	10	3
2	0:51	2	25	0:24	USF	Tyre McCants 21-yard touchdown reception from Quinton Flowers, Emilio Nadelman kick good	10	10
3	11:25	6	28	2:57	TTU	Dylan Cantrell 3-yard touchdown reception from Nic Shimonek, Clayton Hatfield kick good	17	10
3	8:34	9	91	2:51	USF	Darnell Salomon 17-yard touchdown reception from Quinton Flowers, Emilio Nadelman kick good	17	17
3	5:55	4	40	1:45	TTU	Tre King 4-yard touchdown run, Clayton Hatfield kick good	24	17
4	9:30	9	43	3:07	USF	Quinton Flowers 5-yard touchdown run, Emilio Nadelman kick good	24	24
4	5:02	13	60	4:28	TTU	33-yard field goal by Clayton Hatfield	27	24
4	4:26	2	65	0:36	USF	Marquez Valdes-Scantling 64-yard touchdown reception from Quinton Flowers, Emilio Nadelman kick good	27	31
4	1:31	8	85	2:55	TTU	T. J. Vasher 25-yard touchdown reception from Nic Shimonek, Clayton Hatfield kick good	34	31
4	0:16	7	75	1:15	USF	Tyre McCants 26-yard touchdown reception from Quinton Flowers, Emilio Nadelman kick good	34	38
"TOP" = time of possession. For other American football terms, see Glossary of American football.							34	38

=== Statistics ===
	1	2	3	4	Total
Red Raiders	10	0	14	10	34
Bulls	3	7	7	21	38

Statistics	TTU	USF
First downs	28	27
Total offense, plays-yards	94–549	82–561
Rushes-yards (net)	35–133	48–250
Passing yards (net)	416	311
Passes, Comp-Att-Int	32–59–2	17–34–0
Time of Possession	35:21	24:39

Team	Category	Player	Statistics
Texas Tech	Passing	Nic Shimonek	32/59, 416 yds, 3 TD, 2 INT
Texas Tech	Rushing	Justin Stockton	18 car, 103 yds
Texas Tech	Receiving	Keke Coutee	11 rec, 187 yds, 1 TD
South Florida	Passing	Quinton Flowers	17/34, 311 yds, 4 TD
South Florida	Rushing	Quinton Flowers	14 car, 106 yds, 1 TD
South Florida	Receiving	Marquez Valdes-Scantling	3 rec, 133 yds, 1 TD
