= Kiki =

Kiki or Ki Ki may refer to:

== Places ==
- Ki Ki, South Australia, Australia, a village
- Ki Ki, Iran, a village
- Kiai, Iran, a village also known as Kiki
- Kiki, Łask County, Poland, a village
- Kiki, Poddębice County, Poland, a village
- Kiki Station, a train station in Minami, Japan

== People ==
- Kiki (name), a list of people with the given name, nickname or surname
- Kiki Dee, stage name of British singer Pauline Matthews (born 1947)
- Xu Jiaqi (born 1995), Chinese singer and actress known as "Kiki"
- Alice Prin (1901–1953), French artist, writer and model known as "Kiki de Montparnasse" or "Kiki"
- Kiki of Paris, pseudonym of a Parisian photographer (born 1945)

== Arts and entertainment ==
=== Fictional characters ===
- Kiki Strike, one of the main characters in the Kiki Strike book series by Kirsten Miller
- Kiki, the protagonist of the Japanese animated film Kiki's Delivery Service
- Kiki, a character in the animated film Lesbian Space Princess (2025)
- Kiki, a minor character in Saint Seiya, a Japanese manga series
- Kiki, a character created by the Japanese company Sanrio
- Kiki, a ferret in the Sluggy Freelance webcomic
- Kiki, a parrot in The Adventure Series novels
- Kiki, a main character in the Nickelodeon TV series The Fresh Beat Band and its spin-off Fresh Beat Band of Spies
- Kirsten Cohen, a character nicknamed "Kiki" in The O.C. TV series
- Kiki DuRane, of the fictitious cabaret act Kiki and Herb, played by Justin Bond
- Kiki Flores, a main character in The Puzzle Place, a TV series
- Kiki Harrison, Julia Roberts' character in the film America's Sweethearts
- Kiki Kitashima, a supporting character in the animated TV series Big City Greens
- Katherine Tango, a character nicknamed "Kiki" in the film Tango and Cash
- Kiki the Cyber Squirrel, the mascot of the raster graphics editor Krita
- Kiki the Frog, a character in 1960s children's TV show Hector's House
- Kiki the Hyperactive Monkey of Sentosa, host of the Singaporean show Magical Sentosa

=== Films ===
- Kiki (1926 film), an American film starring Norma Talmadge
- Kiki (1931 film), an American remake of the 1926 film starring Mary Pickford
- Kiki (1932 film), a French-German film starring Anny Ondra
- Kiki (2016 film), an American-Swedish documentary film

=== Other uses in arts and entertainment ===
- Kiki, a 1918 play by André Picard
- Kiki (magazine), a magazine for young girls
- Kiki, the collective name for Kojiki and Nihon Shoki, the two most prominent texts of Japanese mythology
- Kiki (Kiana Lede album)

== Radio stations ==
- KIKI (AM), licensed to Honolulu, Hawaii, United States
- KHVH, an AM station licensed to Honolulu, which held the call sign KIKI from 1973 to 1990
- KUBT, an FM station licensed to Honolulu, formerly KIKI, which operates an HD channel named KIKI

== Other uses ==
- Kiki (social gathering), an informal term meaning a social gathering primarily for gossip or generally having a good time
- Kiki Challenge, a social media challenge for In My Feelings#Release and reception
- Bouba/kiki effect, an observed neurophysiological effect tying certain sounds to specific shapes

== See also ==
- Kikis, a given name and surname
- Kikki (disambiguation)
- Keke (disambiguation)
