= Kikki =

Kikki may refer to

- Kikki Danielsson, country, dansband and pop singer from Sweden
  - Kikki (album), a 1982 Kikki Danielsson album
- Kikki, Balochistan, town in Pakistan
- Kikki Benjamin, manga character; see list of Tokyo Mew Mew characters

== See also ==
- Kiki (disambiguation)
