= Keke =

Keke may refer to:

== People ==
=== Surname ===
- Harold Keke (born 1971), Solomon Islands warlord
- Joseph Keke (1927–2017), Beninese politician
- Leo Keke (1947–2012), Nauruan politician
- Ludwig Keke (born c. 1935), Nauruan politician and dentist
- Kieren Keke (born 1971), Nauruan politician and doctor
- Kingsley Keke (born 1996), American football player
- Rachel Keke (born 1974), French politician
- Hélène Aholou Keke, lawyer and politician in Benin

=== Given name or nickname ===
- Keke Bongos, Nigerian film producer
- Keke Coutee (born 1995), American football wide receiver
- Keke Geladze (1858–1937), Georgian mother of Joseph Stalin
- Barkevious Mingo (born 1990), American football player
- Keke Mortson (1934–1995), Canadian ice hockey player
- Keke Palmer (born 1993), American actress
- Keke Rosberg (born 1948), Finnish racing driver
- Keke Wyatt (born 1982), American gospel singer

=== Mononym ===
- Keké (futsal player), Brazilian futsal player Clayton Lima Szabo (born 1982)
- Keké (footballer), Brazilian football winger Paulo de Souza Júnior (born 1995)

=== Stage name ===
- Lil' Keke (born 1976), American rapper
- KeKe Luv, the nickname of a DJ at Idaho's KSAS-FM who stayed awake for 175 hours

== Arts and entertainment ==
=== Fictional characters ===
- Keke, a named character in the puzzle game Baba is You
- Keke Tang, a character from Love Live! Superstar!!

=== Music ===
- "Keke" (song), a 2018 song by 6ix9ine, Fetty Wap and A Boogie wit da Hoodie

== Places ==
- Keke, Mali, a village in the Cercle of Djenné, Mopti Region
- Keke railway station, a station on the Chinese Qingzang Railway

== Transportation ==
- Keke, a Nigerian term for auto rickshaw or motorized tricycle

== See also ==
- Kiki (name)
- John Kekes (born 1936), philosophy scholar
- Kékes, Hungary's highest mountain
- Kékéflipnote, French animator also known as "Kéké"
