= 2017 South Florida Bulls football team =

American college football season

2017 South Florida Bulls football

Birmingham Bowl champion

Birmingham Bowl, W 38–34 vs. Texas Tech
- Conference: American Athletic Conference

Ranking
- Coaches: No. 21
- AP: No. 21
- Record: 10–2 (6–2 AAC)
- Head coach: Charlie Strong (1st season)
- Offensive coordinator: Sterlin Gilbert (1st season)
- Offensive scheme: Veer and shoot
- Defensive coordinator: Brian Jean-Mary (1st season)
- Base defense: 3–3–5
- Home stadium: Raymond James Stadium

2017 American Athletic Conference football standings
	Conf.			Overall
Team	W		L	W		L
East Division
No. 6 UCF xy$	8	–	0	13	–	0
No. 21 South Florida	6	–	2	10	–	2
Temple	4	–	4	7	–	6
Cincinnati	2	–	6	4	–	8
UConn	2	–	6	3	–	9
East Carolina	2	–	6	3	–	9
West Division
No. 25 Memphis xy	7	–	1	10	–	3
Houston	5	–	3	7	–	5
Navy	4	–	4	7	–	6
SMU	4	–	4	7	–	6
Tulane	3	–	5	5	–	7
Tulsa	1	–	7	2	–	10
Championship: UCF 62, Memphis 55
$ – Conference champion; x – Division champion/co-champions; y – Championship game participant; As of January 9, 2018; Rankings from AP Poll.

The 2017 South Florida Bulls football team represented the University of South Florida (USF) in the 2017 NCAA Division I FBS football season. They played their home games at Raymond James Stadium in Tampa, Florida, and were led by first-year head coach Charlie Strong. The Bulls competed as members of the East Division of the American Athletic Conference. They finished the season 10–2, 6–2 in AAC play to finish in second place in the East Division. They were invited to the Birmingham Bowl where they defeated Texas Tech.

== Offseason ==
=== Coaching changes ===
The coaching vacancy left by Willie Taggart was filled when USF hired Charlie Strong as head coach on December 11, 2016. Strong had been the head coach at the University of Texas before being fired after three seasons.

Sterlin Gilbert was named the new offensive coordinator on January 5, 2017. Gilbert had been Charlie Strong's offensive coordinator at Texas in 2016. USF hired Brian Jean-Mary as the new defensive coordinator on January 8, 2017. Jean-Mary has been on Charlie Strong's coaching staff since Strong started coaching at Louisville in 2010. He was Texas's linebackers coach in 2016.

=== Disciplinary issues ===
In late March 2017, senior USF defensive back Hassan Childs was dismissed from the team after being involved in a road rage incident in which he was shot three times. He was charged with aggravated assault and marijuana possession after the incident.

In early May, another USF player was arrested, this time defensive end LaDarrius Jackson, who was charged with assaulting a female in student housing. Judge Margaret Taylor, of Hillsborough County, criticized head coach Charlie Strong's lack of control over his players, saying that she was "ashamed of being an alum." Coach Strong had only been employed at the school for five months at the time of Jackson's arrest and had not recruited either of the players in question. A video of Judge Taylor's comments went viral, and she later recused herself from the case.

== Preseason ==
In the preseason AAC media poll, the Bulls were picked to finish first in the East Division of the AAC, receiving all 30 first-place votes. They also received 26 of 30 votes as the favorite to win the AAC championship.

== Schedule ==
South Florida announced their 2017 football schedule on February 9, 2017.

Date	Time	Opponent	Rank	Site	TV	Result	Attendance
August 26	7:30 p.m.	at San Jose State*	No. 19	CEFCU Stadium; San Jose, CA	CBSSN	W 42–22	13,377
September 2	4:00 p.m.	Stony Brook*	No. 19	Raymond James Stadium; Tampa, FL	ESPN3	W 31–17	26,460
September 15	7:00 p.m.	Illinois*	No. 22	Raymond James Stadium; Tampa, FL	ESPN	W 47–23	35,404
September 21	7:30 p.m.	Temple	No. 21	Raymond James Stadium; Tampa, FL	ESPN	W 43–7	24,325
September 30	12:00 p.m.	at East Carolina	No. 18	Dowdy–Ficklen Stadium; Greenville, NC	CBSSN	W 61–31	34,883
October 14 ^{[a]}	7:30 p.m.	Cincinnati^{†}	No. 18	Raymond James Stadium; Tampa, FL	ESPNU	W 33–3	43,708
October 21	7:00 p.m.	at Tulane	No. 16	Yulman Stadium; New Orleans, LA	ESPN2	W 34–28	17,256
October 28 ^{[b]}	3:45 p.m.	Houston	No. 17	Raymond James Stadium; Tampa, FL	ESPNU	L 24–28	32,316
November 4 ^{[c]}	3:30 p.m.	at UConn		Rentschler Field; East Hartford, CT	ESPNU	W 37–20	18,430
November 16	8:00 p.m.	Tulsa	No. 23	Raymond James Stadium; Tampa, FL	ESPN	W 27–20	26,195
November 24	3:30 p.m.	at No. 13 UCF	No. 22	Spectrum Stadium; Orlando, FL (War on I–4)	ABC	L 42–49	47,129
December 23	12:00 p.m.	vs. Texas Tech*	No. 23	Legion Field; Birmingham, AL (Birmingham Bowl)	ESPN	W 38–34	28,623
*Non-conference game; ^{†}Homecoming; Rankings from AP Poll released prior to the game; All times are in Eastern time

^{^[a]}The game between UMass and USF was cancelled. The game between Cincinnati and USF was moved from October 28th to October 14th.
^{^[b]}The game between Houston and USF was moved from November 4th to October 28th.
^{^[c]}The game between UConn and USF that was cancelled on September 9th was rescheduled for November 4th.

== Game summaries ==
=== At San Jose State ===
	1	2	3	4	Total
No. 19 Bulls	0	28	7	7	42
Spartans	16	0	0	6	22

=== Stony Brook ===
	1	2	3	4	Total
Seawolves	7	3	0	7	17
No. 19 Bulls	7	0	10	14	31

=== Illinois ===
	1	2	3	4	Total
Fighting Illini	2	7	0	14	23
No. 22 Bulls	9	14	14	10	47

=== Temple ===
	1	2	3	4	Total
Owls	0	7	0	0	7
No. 21 Bulls	3	17	13	10	43

=== At East Carolina ===
	1	2	3	4	Total
No. 18 Bulls	21	10	17	13	61
Pirates	10	14	7	0	31

=== Cincinnati ===
	1	2	3	4	Total
Bearcats	3	0	0	0	3
No. 18 Bulls	3	20	7	3	33

=== At Tulane ===
	1	2	3	4	Total
No. 16 Bulls	7	13	14	0	34
Green Wave	0	7	7	14	28

=== Houston ===
	1	2	3	4	Total
Cougars	0	0	14	14	28
No. 17 Bulls	0	7	7	10	24

=== At UConn ===
	1	2	3	4	Total
Bulls	7	10	17	3	37
Huskies	0	7	0	13	20

=== Tulsa ===
	1	2	3	4	Total
Golden Hurricane	7	10	0	3	20
No. 23 Bulls	21	3	3	0	27

=== At UCF ===
	1	2	3	4	Total
No. 22 Bulls	7	13	14	8	42
No. 13 Knights	21	0	7	21	49

=== Vs. Texas Tech–Birmingham Bowl ===
	1	2	3	4	Total
Red Raiders	10	0	14	10	34
No. 23 Bulls	3	7	7	21	38

== Rankings ==
Ranking movements Legend: ██ Increase in ranking ██ Decrease in ranking — = Not ranked RV = Received votes т = Tied with team above or below
	Week															
Poll	Pre	1	2	3	4	5	6	7	8	9	10	11	12	13	14	Final
AP	19	21	22	21	18	18	18	16–T	17	RV	22	23	22	23	23	21
Coaches	21	20	21	17	17	16	15	13	14	23	21	20	19	23	24	21
CFP	Not released									—	—	—	—	—	—	Not released

== Roster ==
2017 South Florida Bulls football team roster
Players
Coaches
Offense

Pos.	#	Name	Class
WR	1	Chris Barr	Jr
RB	2	D'Ernest Johnson	Sr
WR	3	Darnell Salomon	So
RB	6	Darius Tice	Sr
QB	7	Brett Kean	So
WR	8	Tyre McCants	Jr
QB	9	Quinton Flowers	Sr
QB	10	Chris Oladokun	Fr
WR	11	Marquez Valdes-Scantling	Sr
WR	12	Temi Alaka	Sr
WR	14	Deangelo Antonie	So
QB	16	Mike Dean	Fr
QB	17	Kyle Trina	Fr
WR	18	DeVontres Dukes	Fr
RB	22	Duran Bell Jr.	Fr
RB	27	LaDarion McBride	Sr
RB	31	Elijah Mack	Fr
RB	32	Jordan Cronkrite	Jr
RB	36	Davion Sutton	Jr
TE	40	Derek Hintze	Fr
FB	40	Riley Sheehan	So
TE	48	Spencer Adkinson	Sr
TE	49	K. J. Miles	Sr
OL	50	Christion Gainer	Fr
OL	52	Michael Wiggs	Fr
OL	55	Eric Mayes	Jr
OL	61	Jacob Maxfield	Fr
OL	64	Demetris Harris	Fr
OL	66	Matt Nelson	Fr
OL	67	Hal Roberson	Fr
OL	68	Michael Galati	Jr
OL	69	Erik Listoe	So
OL	70	Glen Bethel	Sr
OL	71	Jeremiah Stafford	Fr
OL	72	Brooks Larkin	So
OL	73	Jeremi Hall	Sr
OL	74	Cameron Ruff	Sr
OL	75	Jean Marcellus	Fr
OT	77	Marcus Norman	So
G	78	William Atterbury	So
OL	79	Grant Polk	So
TE	80	Ryan Hintze	Sr
WR	80	Trevor Steinke	Sr
WR	81	Ryeshene Bronson	Sr
WR	83	Jernard Phillips	Fr
WR	84	Randall St. Felix	Fr
TE	85	Elkanah Dillon	Jr
WR	86	Stanley Clerveaux	Jr
TE	87	Frederick Lloyd Jr.	Fr
WR	88	Kevaughn Dingle	Fr
TE	89	Mitchell Wilcox	So
TE	97	Nicholas Munera	Jr

Defense

Pos.	#	Name	Class
CB	3	Deatrick Nichols	Sr
DE	4	Jimmy Bates	Jr
DT	10	Deadrin Senat	Sr
LB	12	Andre Polk Jr.	Fr
CB	13	Tajee Fullwood	Sr
DB	14	Mike Hampton	Fr
DE	15	Vincent Jackson	Jr
S	18	Jaymon Thomas	Jr
CB	19	Ronnie Hoggins	Jr
S	20	Devin Abraham	Sr
S	21	Khalid McGee	Jr
DB	22	Mekhi LaPointe	Fr
CB	23	Mazzi Wilkins	Jr
DB	24	Nick Roberts	Fr
DB	25	Bentlee Sanders	Fr
S	26	Craig Watts	Fr
DB	27	Naytron Culpepper	Fr
DB	28	Donelle Thomas	Fr
LB	29	Devon Jones-Stewart	Sr
DB	30	Jeffery Farrar	Jr
LB	33	David Small	Fr
LB	34	Keirston Johnson	Fr
DE	35	Jabreel Stephens	Fr
CB	37	Nate Ferguson	Jr
CB	38	Nick Cuccia	So
DB	39	Trent Shaw	So
LB	41	Greg Reaves	So
LB	43	Auggie Sanchez	Sr
DT	44	Garry Cadet	Jr
DE	45	Darrien Grant	Fr
LB	51	Mi'Cario Stanley	Fr
LB	53	Danny Thomas	Jr
LB	54	Nico Sawtelle	So
LB	55	Josh Black	Jr
DE	56	Juwuan Brown	Jr
LB	57	A. J. Franco	Fr
LB	58	Anthony Beko	Jr
LB	59	Andrew Mims	Fr
DT	60	Bruce Hector	Sr
DT	90	Kevin Kegler	Fr
DE	91	Frank Johnson	Jr
DE	92	Marquies Price	Jr
DT	93	Brandon Boyce	Jr
DE	94	Kirk Livingstone	So
DT	95	Marlon Gonzalez	So
DT	96	Kevlin Pinkney Jr.	Fr
DE	98	Mike Love	Sr
DE	99	Kevin Bronson	Jr

Special teams

Pos.	#	Name	Class
K	35	Emilio Nadelman	Sr
K	38	Marco Salani	Fr
K	42	Jake Vivonetto	Sr
P	44	Jonathan Hernandez	Sr
LS	46	Zach Deitz	So

Head coach

- Charlie Strong

Coordinators/assistant coaches

- Sterlin Gilbert (offensive coordinator / quarterbacks coach)
- Brian Jean-Mary (assistant head coach / defensive coordinator / linebackers coach)
- Blue Adams (defensive backs)
- Justin Burke (Tight Ends / special teams coordinator)
- Damon Cogdell (defensive ends)
- Sean Cronin (defensive tackles)
- Shaun King (running backs)
- Matt Mattox (offensive line / run game coordinator)
- Charlie Williams (wide receivers)

Legend

- (C) Team captain
- (S) Suspended
- (I) Ineligible
- Injured
- Redshirt

Roster
Last update: October 10, 2017

== Players in the 2018 NFL draft ==
Player	Position	Round	Pick	NFL club
Deadrin Senat	DT	3	90	Atlanta Falcons
Marquez Valdes-Scantling	WR	5	174	Green Bay Packers
