= Kikis =

Kikis is a given name and surname. Notable people with the name include:

- Kikis Kazamias (born 1951), Cypriot economist and politician; former Minister of Finance
- Thoma Kikis (fl. 2003), American film producer and designer

== See also ==
- Kiki (disambiguation)
