= Wichita Heights High School =

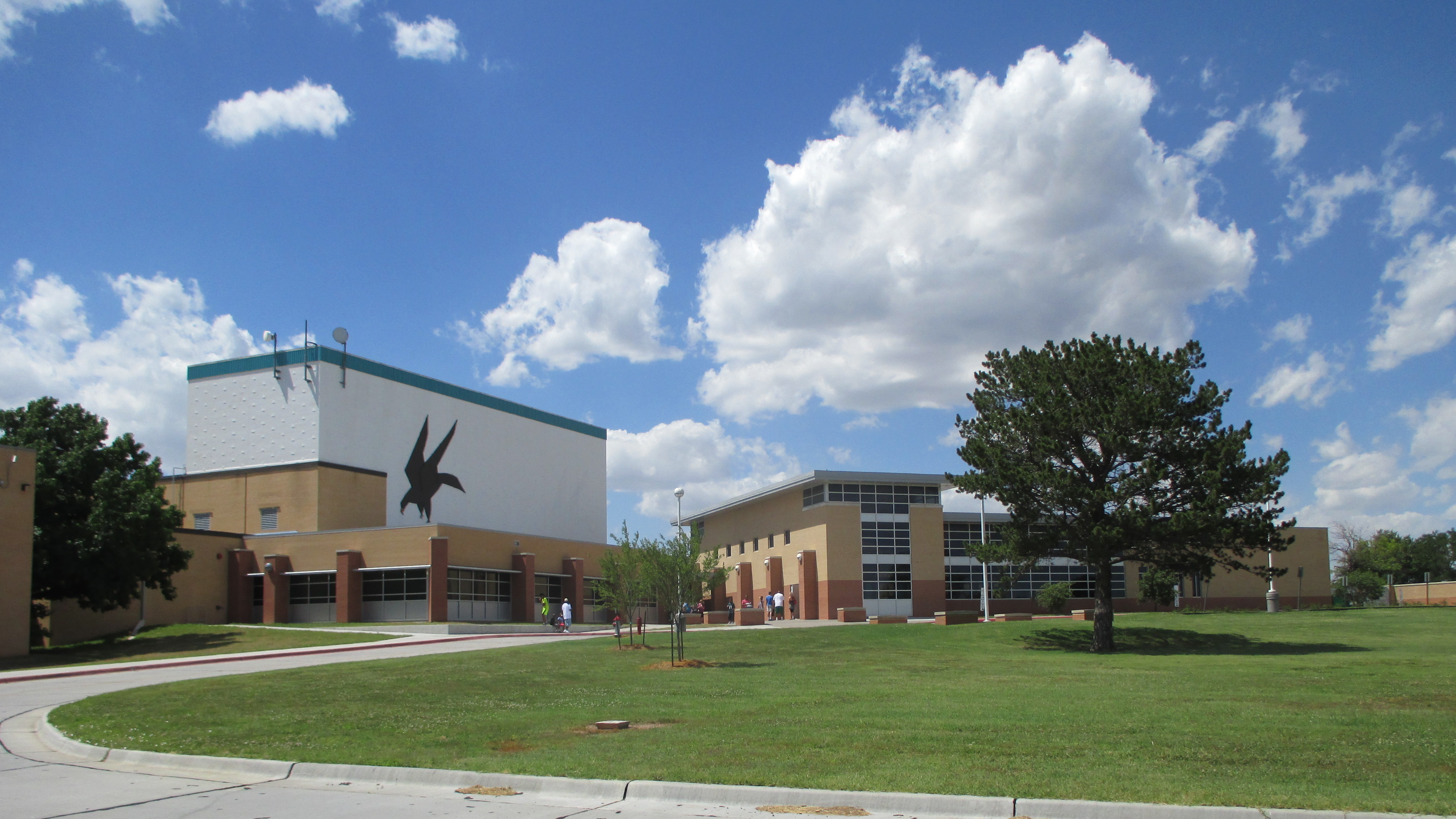

Location
- 5301 North Hillside Street; Wichita, Kansas 67219; United States; 37°46′43″N 97°18′02″W

Information
- School type: Public, High School
- Established: 1961
- School district: Wichita USD 259
- CEEB code: 173212
- Principal: Eric Filippi
- Teaching staff: 87.89 (FTE)
- Grades: 9 to 12
- Gender: coed
- Enrollment: 1,454 (2023-2024)
- Student to teacher ratio: 16.54
- Campus type: Urban
- Colors: Red; Black
- Athletics: Class 6A
- Athletics conference: Greater Wichita Athletic League
- Nickname: Falcons
- Newspaper: The Heights Highlighter
- Website: heights.usd259.org

Wichita Heights High School, known locally as Heights, is a public secondary school in Wichita, Kansas, United States. It is operated by Wichita USD 259 school district and serves students in grades 9 to 12. The school colors are red and black.

Wichita Heights is a member of the Kansas State High School Activities Association and offers a variety of sports programs. Athletic teams compete in the 6A division and are known as the "Falcons". Extracurricular activities are also offered in the form of performing arts, school publications, and clubs.

== History ==
Wichita Heights High School was originally approved, planned and built as Wichita Heights Rural School District Number 192, to serve the districts of Bridgeport, Kechi, Kechi Center, Riverside, and Riverview. No secondary school existed at the time for these districts; prior to its construction students were placed into other Wichita area schools. Construction of the school started in 1959, and was finished two years later in 1961 in time for the school year.

In July 1963, the school became part of the Wichita Public School District (Wichita USD 259). In 1983, Wichita Heights was designated an urban overflow school due to the increasing populations of other inner city schools.

== Extracurricular activities ==
=== Athletics ===
The Falcons compete in the Greater Wichita Athletic League and are classified as a 6A school, the largest classification in Kansas according to the Kansas State High School Activities Association. Throughout its history, Wichita Heights has won twenty five state championships in various sports. Several graduates have gone on to participate in collegiate and professional athletics. The football team won a state championship in 2010 against Olathe North High School on November 27, 2010 by a score of 48–14.

=== State championships ===
State Championships
Season	Sport	Number of Championships	Year
Fall	Football	1	2010
Winter	Swimming, Boys	3	2015, 2017, 2019
Winter	Wrestling	3	1968, 1976, 2011
Winter	Basketball, Boys	7	1977, 2009, 2010, 2011, 2012, 2015, 2022
Winter	Basketball, Girls	7	1979, 2002, 2003, 2006, 2007, 2011, 2012
Winter	Bowling, Girls	3	2006, 2010, 2011
Spring	Softball	1	1988
Total		25	

Wichita Heights High School offers the following sports:

=== Fall ===
- Football
- Volleyball
- Boys Cross-Country
- Girls Cross-Country
- Girls Golf
- Boys Soccer
- Girls Tennis
- Cheerleading
- Pommies
- Debate

=== Winter ===
- Boys Basketball
- Girls Basketball
- Boys Swimming/Diving
- Boys Wrestling
- Girls Wrestling
- Boys Bowling
- Girls Bowling
- Winter Cheerleading
- Science Olympiad

=== Spring ===
- Baseball
- Boys Golf
- Boys Tennis
- Girls Soccer
- Girls Swimming/Diving
- Softball
- Boys Track and Field
- Girls Track and Field
- Forensics

== Notable alumni ==
- Dennis Rader (1963), serial killer known as BTK
- Stephen Hill (1968), judge on the Kansas Court of Appeals
- Cynthia Sikes Yorkin (1972), actress and former Miss Kansas
- Ray Troll (1972), Alaskan artist, musician
- Mark Parkinson (1975), former Governor of Kansas
- Darnell Valentine (1977), former NBA player
- Antoine Carr (1979), former NBA player
- Aubrey Sherrod (1981), former basketball player
- Darren Dreifort (1990), former MLB pitcher
- Jeffrey Prescott (1990), former U.S. ambassador to the United Nations Agencies for Food and Agriculture
- Sheinelle Jones (1996), NBC News and Today journalist
- Danny Roew (1998), film director
- Shaun Smith (1999), former NFL player
- Mike Pelfrey (2002), former MLB pitcher
- Xzavie Jackson (2003), former IFL defensive end
- Dreamius Smith (2011), former NFL running back
- Perry Ellis (2012), basketball player who plays overseas
- Tre King (2015), IFL running back

== See also ==
- Education in Kansas
- List of high schools in Kansas
- List of unified school districts in Kansas
