= Derrick Willies =

American football player (born 1994)

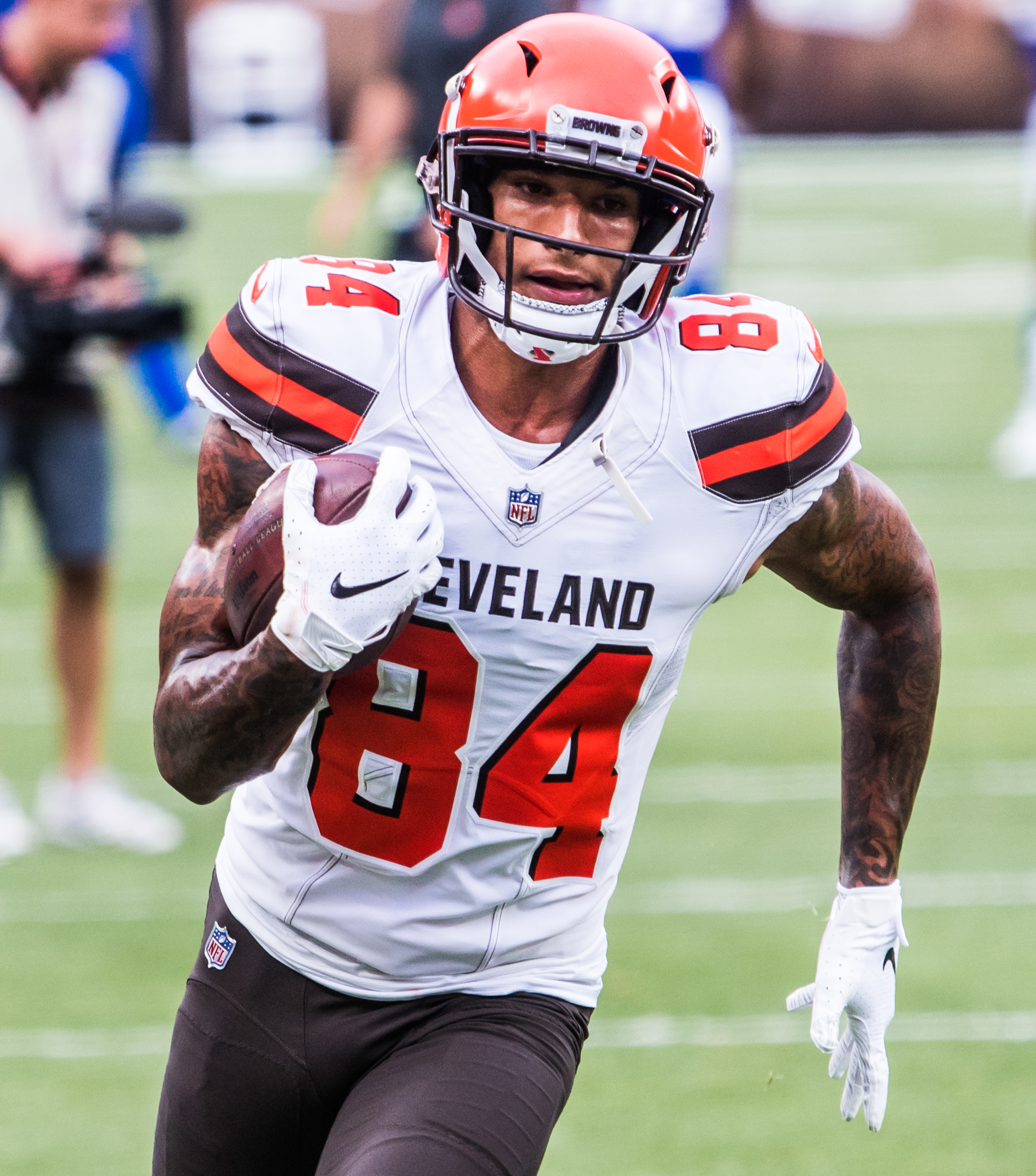
- Willies with the Cleveland Browns in 2018

No. 16, 84
- Position: Wide receiver

Personal information
- Born: October 17, 1994 (age 32); Banning, California, U.S.
- Listed height: 6 ft 4 in (1.93 m)
- Listed weight: 207 lb (94 kg)

Career information
- High school: Rock Island (Rock Island, Illinois)
- College: Texas Tech
- NFL draft: 2018: undrafted

Career history
- Cleveland Browns (2018–2020); Tampa Bay Bandits (2022)

Career NFL statistics
- Receptions: 3
- Receiving yards: 61
- Stats at Pro Football Reference

Derrick Willies (born October 17, 1994) is an American former professional football player who was a wide receiver in the National Football League (NFL). He played college football for the Texas Tech Red Raiders and played professionally for the Cleveland Browns of the National Football League (NFL).

== Early life ==
Willies attended and played high school football and ran track at Burlington High School in Iowa before transferring Rock Island High School during his junior year and was named all-state at both schools. In track, Willies won the Illinois Class 3A state championship in the 110-meter hurdles.

== College career ==
Willies began his college career at the University of Iowa. After sitting out his first year, Willies had 4 catches for 71 yards and a touchdown as a redshirt freshman before leaving the team in late October. Willies transferred to Trinity Valley Community College where he was a first-team Junior College Athletic Association All-American and subsequently transferred to Texas Tech. Willies caught 36 passes for 592 yards and five touchdowns over two seasons with the Red Raiders.

== Professional career ==
=== Cleveland Browns ===
Willies was signed by the Cleveland Browns as an undrafted free agent on May 4, 2018. Willies made the Browns 53-man roster and made his NFL debut on September 9, 2018, during the team's season opener against the Pittsburgh Steelers. On October 7 against the Baltimore Ravens, Willies caught his first career NFL pass, a 13-yard reception, and had a pivotal 39-yard reception in overtime to set up the Browns' game-winning field goal. After fracturing his collarbone during practice on October 12, Willies was placed on injured reserve on October 13, 2018.

On August 31, 2019, Willies was waived by the Browns and was signed to the practice squad the next day. His practice squad contract with the team expired on January 6, 2020, and he was not invited to training camp by any team.

Willies was re-signed to the Browns' practice squad on November 17, 2020. He was elevated to the active roster on December 26 for the team's week 16 game against the New York Jets, and reverted to the practice squad after the game.

Willies was signed to a reserve/futures contract by the Browns on January 18, 2021. The Browns placed Willies on the reserve/retired list on July 30, 2021. He was waived from the reserve/retired list on February 17, 2022.

=== Tampa Bay Bandits ===
Willies was selected in the 14th round of the 2022 USFL draft by the Tampa Bay Bandits. He was transferred to the team's inactive roster on April 22, 2022. He was moved to the inactive roster again on May 11. He was moved back to the active roster on May 20.

== NFL statistics ==
Regular season statistics
Year	Team	Games		Receiving						Fumbles	
Year	Team	GP	GS	Tgt	Rec	Pct	Yds	TD	1D	Fum	Lost
2018	CLE	5	0	5	3	60%	61	0	2	1	0
2020	CLE	1	0	0	0	0	0	0	0	0	0
Career		6	0	5	3	60%	61	0	2	1	0
