= Dylan Cantrell =

American football player (born 1994)

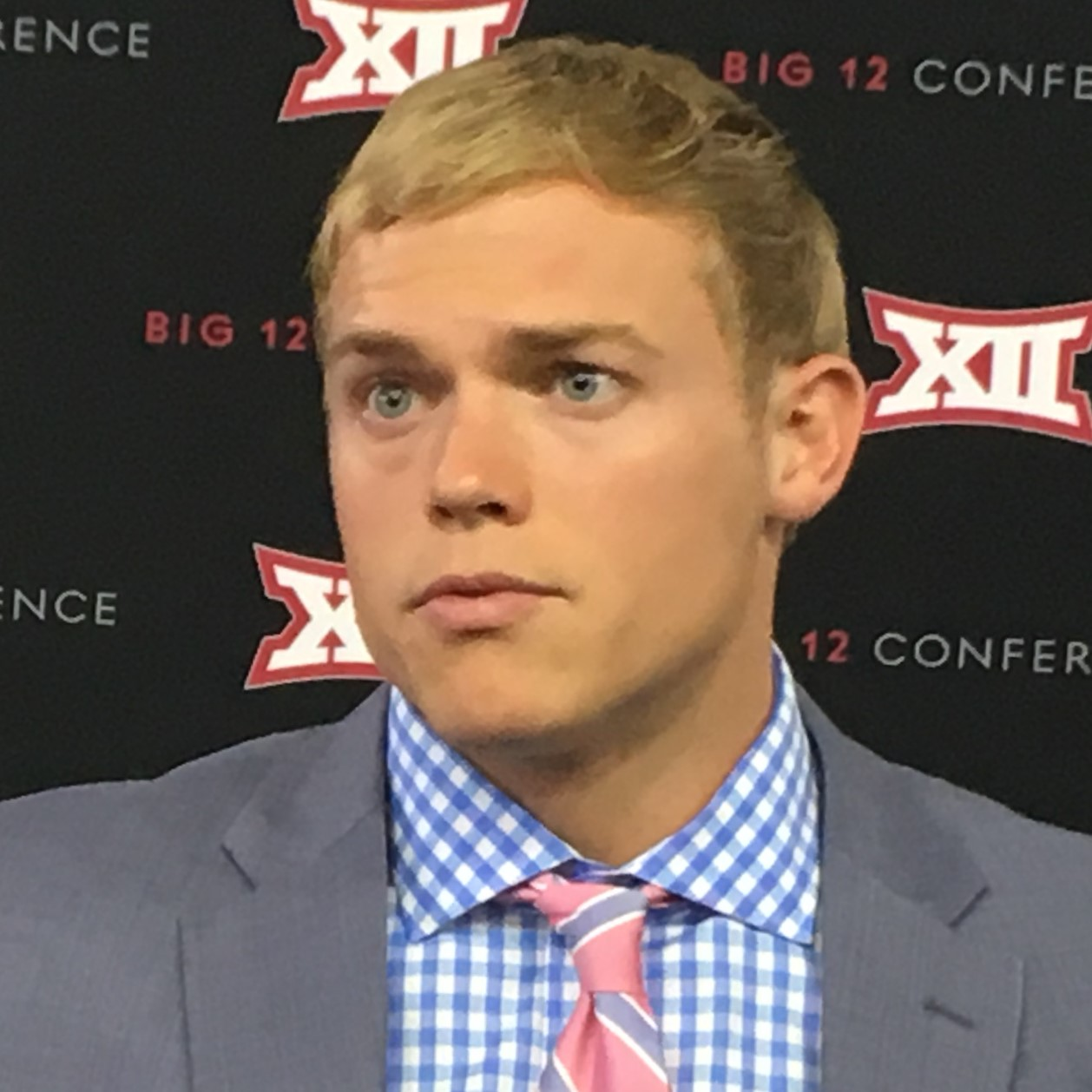
- Cantrell in 2017

No. 84
- Position: Wide receiver

Personal information
- Born: June 29, 1994 (age 32); Tyler, Texas, U.S.
- Listed height: 6 ft 3 in (1.91 m)
- Listed weight: 226 lb (103 kg)

Career information
- High school: Whitehouse (Whitehouse, Texas)
- College: Texas Tech
- NFL draft: 2018: 6th round, 191st overall pick

Career history
- Los Angeles Chargers (2018–2019); Arizona Cardinals (2020)*; New England Patriots (2020)*; Washington Football Team (2020–2021)
- * Offseason or practice squad member only
- Stats at Pro Football Reference

Dylan Cantrell (born June 29, 1994) is an American former professional football tight end. He played college football at Texas Tech and was selected by the Los Angeles Chargers as a wide receiver in the sixth round of the 2018 NFL draft.

== College career ==
Cantrell was a four-star recruit coming out of high school. He chose Texas Tech over Arkansas, West Virginia, Ole Miss, and Mississippi State.

In his freshman year, Cantrell played in 11 games with 9 receptions for 70 yards and 1 touchdown.

For his sophomore year, Cantrell played in all 12 games with 20 receptions for 312 yards and 2 touchdowns.

Cantrell was redshirted for the 2015 season due to a back injury.

Despite missing two games due to injury, Dylan Cantrell had a breakout season his junior year. Cantrell played in 10 games with 57 receptions for 669 yards with 8 touchdowns.

Cantrell built on the success of his junior year during his senior year. Cantrell played in all 13 games for the Red Raiders with 71 receptions for 816 yards with 7 touchdowns. Cantrell also had one rushing attempt for 3 yards that resulted in a touchdown.

=== Statistics ===
Season	Team	Receiving					Rushing		
Season	Team	Rec	Yds	Avg	Lng	TD	Att	Yds	TD
2013	Texas Tech	9	70	7.8	16	1	0	0	0
2014	Texas Tech	20	312	15.6	40	2	0	0	0
2016	Texas Tech	58	675	11.6	54	8	0	0	0
2017	Texas Tech	71	816	11.5	42	7	1	3	1
Career		158	1,873	11.9	54	18	1	3	1

== Professional career ==
Pre-draft measurables
Height	Weight	Arm length	Hand span	40-yard dash	10-yard split	20-yard split	20-yard shuttle	Three-cone drill	Vertical jump	Broad jump	Bench press
6 ft 2 7/8 in (1.90 m)	226 lb (103 kg)	31 3/8 in (0.80 m)	9 1/4 in (0.23 m)	4.44 s	1.65 s	2.60 s	4.03 s	6.56 s	41.0 in (1.04 m)	11 ft 3 in (3.43 m)	18 reps
All values from NFL Combine/Pro Day

=== Los Angeles Chargers ===
Cantrell was selected by the Los Angeles Chargers as a wide receiver in the sixth round (191st overall) of the 2018 NFL draft. He was waived on September 1, 2018, and was signed to the practice squad the next day. He was promoted to the active roster on December 3, 2018.

On July 28, 2019, Cantrell was waived/injured by the Chargers and placed on injured reserve the next day, where he remained for the entire season. At the start of the 2020 league year in March, Cantrell became a free agent when the Chargers elected not to tender him as an exclusive-rights free agent.

=== Arizona Cardinals ===
On June 1, 2020, Cantrell was signed by the Arizona Cardinals with the intentions of switching to tight end. On September 5, 2020, Cantrell was waived during final roster cuts, and re-signed to the practice squad a day later. He was released two days later.

=== New England Patriots ===
On November 10, 2020, the New England Patriots signed Cantrell to their practice squad. He was released on November 13.

=== Washington Football Team ===
On December 23, 2020, Cantrell was signed to the Washington Football Team's practice squad. He signed a reserve/futures contract with the team on January 11, 2021. He was waived/injured on June 3, 2021, and subsequently reverted to the team's injured reserve list the next day.
