= Kiki (name) =

Kiki is a female given name, a unisex nickname and a surname.

== Given name ==
- Kiki Bertens (born 1991), Dutch former tennis player
- Kiki Byrne (1937–2013), Norwegian-born London fashion designer
- Kiki Gyan (1957–2004), Ghanaian keyboardist with the band Osibisa
- Kiki Hendriks (born 2000), Dutch para-athlete
- Kiki Jefferson (born 2001), American basketball player
- Kiki Kogelnik (1935–1997), Austrian painter, sculptor and filmmaker
- Kiki McDonough, British jewellery designer
- Kiki Smith (born 1954), American feminist artist
- Kiki Wong (born 1989), American musician

== Nickname ==
- Kiki (singer), Finnish singer-songwriter
- Kiki Carter (born 1957), American environmental activist, singer/songwriter and columnist
- Kiki Curls (born 1968), Democratic member of the Missouri Senate
- Kiki Cutter (born 1951), American alpine skier
- Kiki Cuyler (1898–1950), American baseball player
- Kiki Camarena (1947–1985), murdered undercover agent for the United States Drug Enforcement Administration
- Kiki Dimoula (1931–2020), Greek poet
- Kiki Divaris (c. 1925–2015), Greek fashion designer
- Ruth Bader Ginsburg (1933-2020), Associate Justice of the Supreme Court of the United States, whose family nickname was "Kiki"
- Kiki Håkansson (c. 1929-2011), winner of the first Miss World beauty pageant in 1951
- Kiki Iriafen (born 2003), American basketball player
- Jean-Jacques Kilama (born 1985), Cameroonian-born Hong Kong footballer
- Kiki Musampa (born 1977), Dutch footballer
- Kiki Preston (1898–1946), American socialite who allegedly had a son out of wedlock fathered by Prince George, Duke of Kent
- Kiki Rice (born 2004), American basketball player
- Kiki Sanford (born 1974), American research scientist in neurophysiology
- Kierra Sheard (born 1987), American gospel and R&B singer
- Kiki Shepard (born 1951), African-American television host
- Kiki Sheung (born 1958), Hong Kong actress
- Kiki VanDeWeghe (born 1958), American basketball player and sports analyst

== Surname ==
- Albert Maori Kiki (1931–1993), Papua New Guinea pathologist and politician
- Dani Kiki (born 1988), Bulgarian footballer

== See also ==
- Keke (disambiguation)
