= Kiai, Iran =

Kiai كيايی
- Village
- Location within Iran
- Coordinates: 25°51′07″N 58°07′12″E
- Country: Iran
- Province: Hormozgan
- County: Jask
- Bakhsh: Central
- Rural District: Gabrik

Population (2006)
  - Total: 59
- Time zone: UTC+3:30 (IRST)
  - Summer (DST): UTC+4:30 (IRDT)

Kiai (Persian: كيايی, also Romanized as Kīā’ī, Kiya’ī, and Keyā’ī; also known as Kīāy and Kiki) is a village in Gabrik Rural District, in the Central District of Jask County, Hormozgan Province, Iran. At the 2006 census, its population was 59, in 14 families.
