= DaMarcus Fields =

American gridiron football player (born 1998)

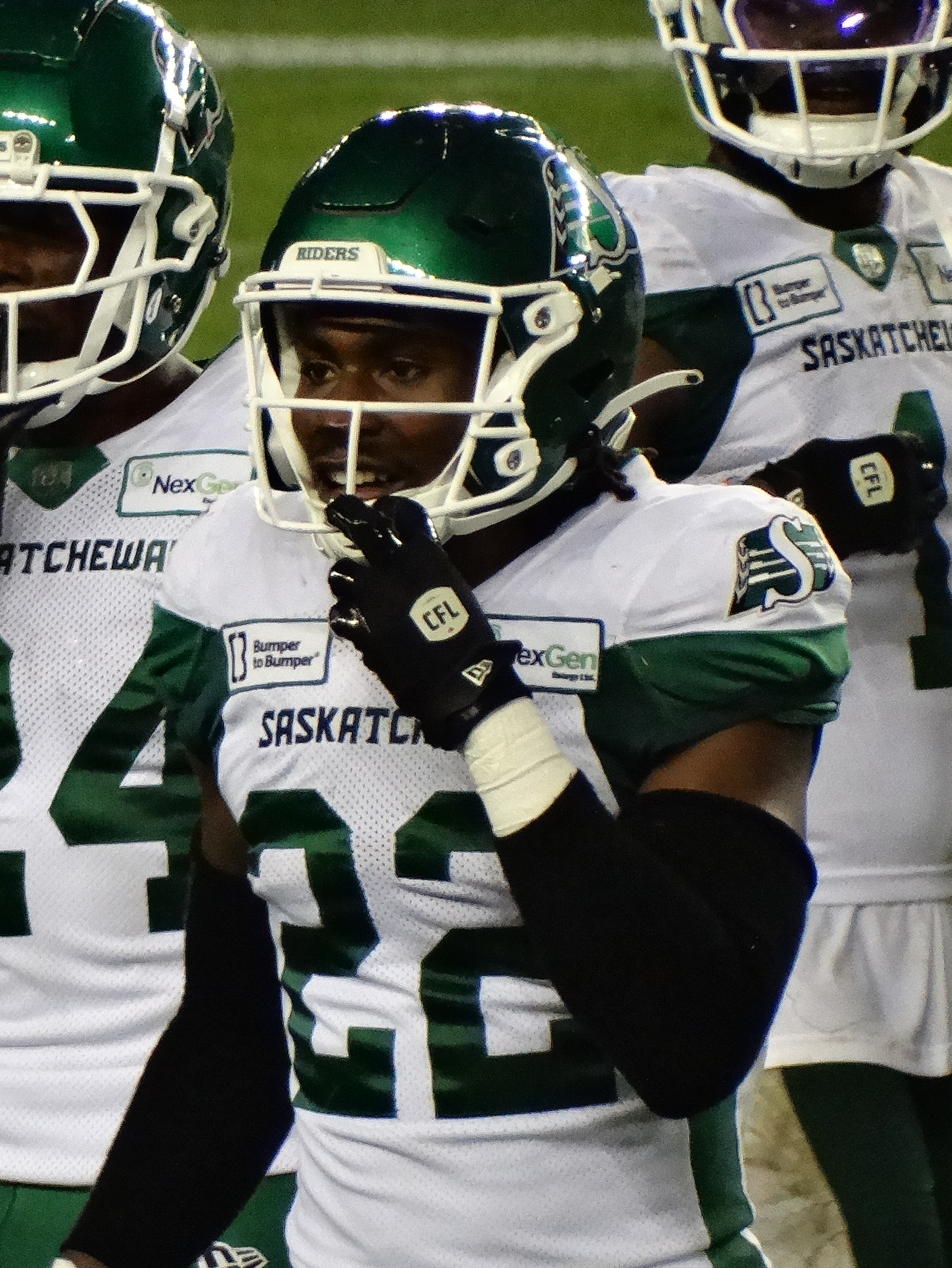
- Fields with the Saskatchewan Roughriders in 2024

No. 22 – Saskatchewan Roughriders
- Position: Defensive back
- Roster status: Active
- CFL status: American

Personal information
- Born: March 11, 1998 (age 28); Taylor, Texas, U.S.
- Listed height: 6 ft 0 in (1.83 m)
- Listed weight: 200 lb (91 kg)

Career information
- High school: Taylor
- College: Texas Tech (2016–2021)
- NFL draft: 2022: undrafted

Career history
- New Orleans Saints (2022); Washington Commanders (2022–2023)*; Saskatchewan Roughriders (2024–present)
- * Offseason or practice squad member only

Awards and highlights
- Grey Cup champion (2025); Second-team All-Big 12 (2021)

Career NFL statistics
- Games played: 2
- Stats at Pro Football Reference

DaMarcus F. Fields (born March 11, 1998) is an American professional football defensive back for the Saskatchewan Roughriders of the Canadian Football League (CFL). He played college football at Texas Tech and signed with the New Orleans Saints as an undrafted free agent in 2022.

== Early life ==
Fields was born on March 11, 1998, in Taylor, Texas. He attended Taylor High School, playing two seasons of varsity football as well as basketball and track. He was a 14-4A first-team all-district selection and was named second-team all-Central Texas by the Austin American-Statesman. In his senior year, Fields compiled 101 tackles, four interceptions and eight forced fumbles.

== College career ==
Fields committed to Texas Tech. As a freshman in 2016, he redshirted and did not play, being a member of the scout team. He became a starter at cornerback in 2017, appearing in all 13 games (11 as a starter). He recorded a total of 51 tackles, placing fifth on the team, and made two fumble recoveries, two forced fumbles and one interception. His fumble recovery total placed first in the conference and 26th nationally. He was named Big 12 Conference Newcomer of the Week after making an interception return touchdown against Oklahoma State.

Fields started all 12 games as a sophomore in 2018. He recorded a total of 38 tackles, including 2.5 for-loss, as well as 11 passes defended. He ranked second on the team in passes defended and led the school with two fumbles recovered. At the end of the year, he was named honorable mention all-conference by the Big 12 coaches. In 2019, Fields started nine games at cornerback and played in a total of 10, compiling 54 tackles, a mark which placed fifth on Texas Tech. He also had the team lead with five passes broken up and was second with three interceptions made. He was named an honorable mention all-conference selection again that season.

As a senior, Fields started six games and made 31 total tackles, as well as one forced fumble, one recovery, and 11 passes broken up. He ranked fourth in the FBS in passes defended per-game and was named honorable mention all-conference by the coaches, as well as fourth-team all-conference by Phil Steele's magazine. He elected to return to the team in 2021 as a fifth-year player, as he was given an extra year of eligibility due to the COVID-19 pandemic.

In the 2021 season, Fields played in 12 games and made 50 tackles. He also made a team-leading 11 pass breakups and was named second-team all-conference at the end of the year, marking the fourth time he made the team. He was given an opportunity to play in the East–West Shrine Bowl after the regular season concluded. He was one of three Texas Tech players to be invited to the NFL Combine. Fields ended his college career with a total of 224 tackles, 13.5 for-loss, four forced fumbles and four recoveries, four interceptions and 45 total passes defended. He was the first member of his family to graduate from college.

== Professional career ==
Pre-draft measurables
Height	Weight	Arm length	Hand span	Wingspan	40-yard dash	10-yard split	20-yard split	20-yard shuttle	Three-cone drill	Vertical jump	Broad jump	Bench press
5 ft 11 5/8 in (1.82 m)	193 lb (88 kg)	31 1/4 in (0.79 m)	9 1/8 in (0.23 m)	6 ft 3 3/8 in (1.91 m)	4.48 s	1.58 s	2.62 s	4.29 s	6.95 s	37.0 in (0.94 m)	9 ft 11 in (3.02 m)	11 reps
All values from NFL Combine/Pro Day

=== New Orleans Saints ===
Fields signed with the New Orleans Saints as an undrafted free agent following the 2022 NFL draft. He was waived on August 30 but re-signed to the practice squad the following day. He was elevated to the active roster for their week three game against the Carolina Panthers, and made his NFL debut in the match, after which he was reverted back to the practice squad.

Fields was signed to the active roster on September 28 but was waived on October 4, 2022.

=== Washington Commanders ===
Fields signed with the Washington Commanders' practice squad on October 26, 2022. He signed a reserve/future contract on January 9, 2023. On August 28, 2023, he was released as part of final roster cuts before the start of 2023 season.

=== Saskatchewan Roughriders ===
Fields was signed by the Saskatchewan Roughriders of the Canadian Football League on March 25, 2024.
