= Tre King =

American football player

Tulsa Oilers
- Position: Running back
- Roster status: Active

Personal information
- Born: Wichita, Kansas, U.S.
- Listed height: 5 ft 11 in (1.80 m)
- Listed weight: 190 lb (86 kg)

Career information
- High school: Wichita (KS) Heights
- College: Texas Tech
- NFL draft: 2019: undrafted

Career history
- Cologne Centurions (2022); Tulsa Oilers (2023–present)

Tre King is an American football running back for the Tulsa Oilers of the Indoor Football League (IFL). He played college football for the Texas Tech University.

== Early life ==
King was born as one of five siblings in Wichita, Kansas and went to Wichita Heights High School. As a junior he immediately rushed for over 1,000 yards with 18 touchdowns and led his Flacons to the playoffs. This earned him the Topeka Capital-Journal’s All-Class honorable mention. The next season where he had a 8-3 season as a senior and an appearance in the Class 5A quarterfinals.

== College career ==
After his last high school year he committed to Hutchinson Community College and became a member of the Blue Devils. There he racked up 43 yards in 8 carries in his freshman season 2015. As a sophomore he carried 90 times for 352 yards and five touchdowns before his seasons was cut short due to his first major injury. After his 2016 season he transferred to Texas Tech University and the Texas Tech Red Raiders football program. In his first game 2017 he scored a touchdown against the Eastern Washington Eagles. He finished his junior season as he ran for 623 yards, five scores and appeared in all of the 13 regular season game. He finished his last college season with 160 yards on 40 carries but appeared only in 6 games to a knee injury.

=== College statistics ===
Year	Team	GP	Receiving				Rushing			
Year	Team	GP	REC	Yds	Avg	TDs	Att	Yds	Avg	TDs
NJCAA Division I
2015	Hutch. Blue Dragons	8	2	14	7.0	0	10	43	4.3	0
2016	Hutch. Blue Dragons	6	1	4	4.0	0	90	368	4.1	5
FBS Division I
2017	Texas Red Raiders	13	17	104	6.1	0	131	623	4.8	5
2018	Texas Red Raiders	6	8	48	6.0	0	40	160	4.0	1
College total		32	28	170	5.8	0	271	1,194	4.3	11
Source: footballdb.com

== Professional career ==
=== Cologne Centurions ===
The Cologne Centurions signed him for the 2022 season as last of their four American import roster spots.

=== Tulsa Oilers ===
On October 5, 2022, King signed with the Tulsa Oilers of the Indoor Football League (IFL).

=== Professional statistics ===
Year	Team	GP	Receiving				Rushing			
Year	Team	GP	REC	Yds	Avg	TDs	Att	Yds	Avg	TDs
European League of Football
2022	Cologne Centurions	0	0	0	0	0	0	0	0	0
ELF total		0	0	0	0	0	0	0	0	0
Source: EuropeanLeague.Football
