= Marquez Valdes-Scantling =

American football player (born 1994)

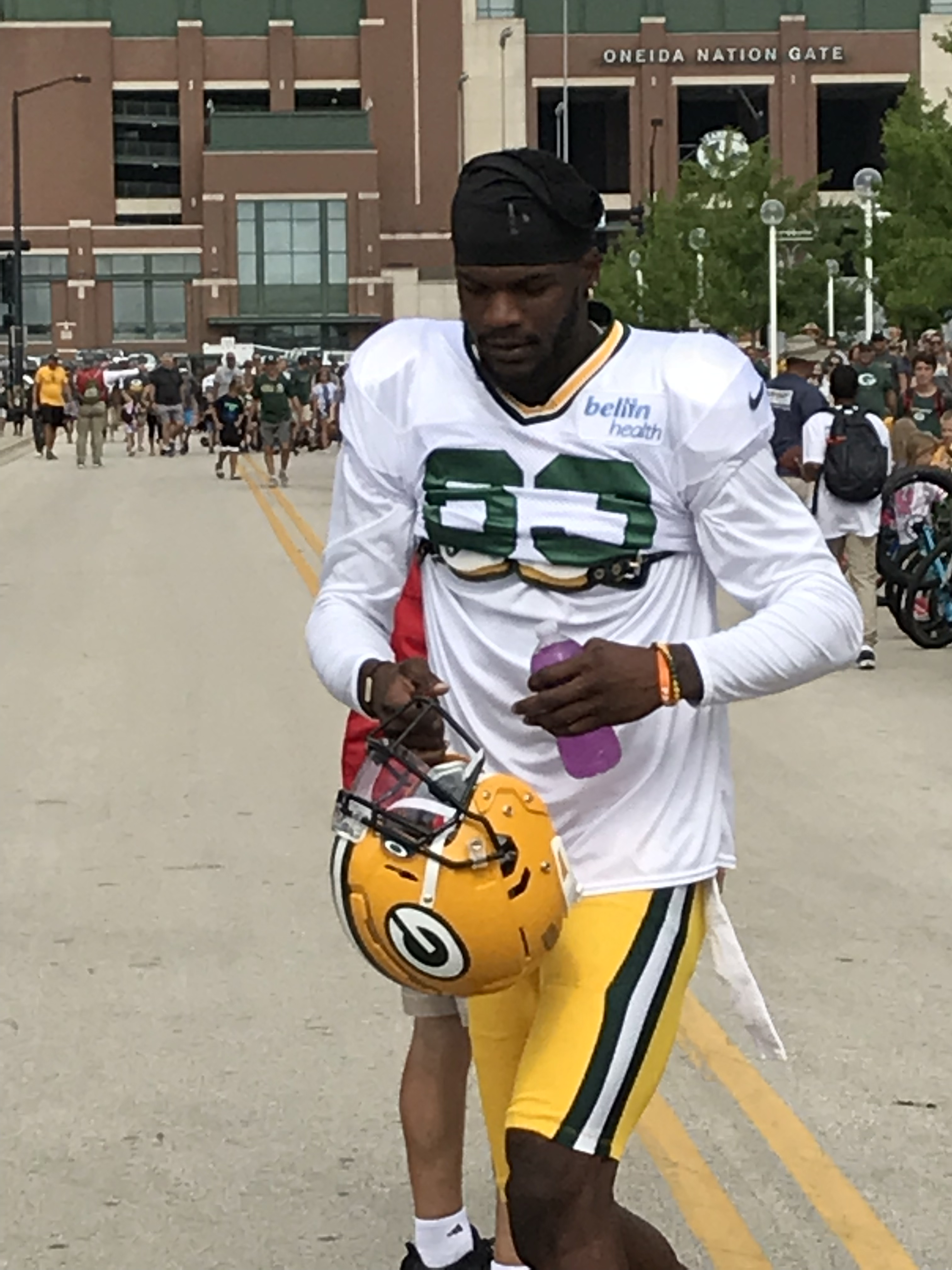
- Valdes-Scantling with the Green Bay Packers in 2019

No. 83 – Pittsburgh Steelers
- Position: Wide receiver
- Roster status: Practice squad

Personal information
- Born: October 10, 1994 (age 32); St. Petersburg, Florida, U.S.
- Listed height: 6 ft 4 in (1.93 m)
- Listed weight: 206 lb (93 kg)

Career information
- High school: Lakewood (St. Petersburg)
- College: NC State (2013–2014); South Florida (2015–2017)
- NFL draft: 2018: 5th round, 174th overall pick

Career history
- Green Bay Packers (2018–2021); Kansas City Chiefs (2022–2023); Buffalo Bills (2024); New Orleans Saints (2024); Seattle Seahawks (2025)*; San Francisco 49ers (2025); Pittsburgh Steelers (2025); Dallas Cowboys (2026)*; Los Angeles Chargers (2026); Pittsburgh Steelers (2026–present)*
- * Offseason or practice squad member only

Awards and highlights
- 2× Super Bowl champion (LVII, LVIII)

Career NFL statistics as of Week 7, 2026
- Receptions: 221
- Receiving yards: 3,708
- Receiving touchdowns: 21
- Stats at Pro Football Reference

Marquez Reshard Valdes-Scantling (born October 10, 1994), also known by his initials MVS, is an American professional football wide receiver for the Pittsburgh Steelers of the National Football League (NFL). He played college football for the NC State Wolfpack and South Florida Bulls, and was selected by the Green Bay Packers in the fifth round of the 2018 NFL draft. In 2022, Valdes-Scantling joined the Kansas City Chiefs, helping the Chiefs win Super Bowl LVII and Super Bowl LVIII. He has also played for the Buffalo Bills, New Orleans Saints, and San Francisco 49ers.

== Early life ==
Valdes-Scantling attended Lakewood High School where he played football. He recorded 50 receptions for 800 receiving yards and 14 receiving touchdowns as a senior.

== College career ==
Valdes-Scantling played college football at NC State from 2013 to 2014 and South Florida from 2015 to 2017. He had to sit out the 2015 season due to transfer rules.

=== College statistics ===
Season	Team	GP	Receiving				Rushing			
Season	Team	GP	Rec	Yds	Avg	TD	Att	Yds	Avg	TD
2013	NC State	7	22	281	12.8	0	0	0	0	0
2014	NC State	9	22	257	11.7	1	0	0	0	0
2016	USF	11	22	415	18.9	5	2	4	2.0	0
2017	USF	12	53	879	16.6	6	8	108	13.5	1
Career		39	119	1,832	15.4	12	10	112	12.1	1

== Professional career ==
Pre-draft measurables
Height	Weight	Arm length	Hand span	Wingspan	40-yard dash	10-yard split	20-yard split	20-yard shuttle	Three-cone drill	Vertical jump	Broad jump	Bench press
6 ft 4 in (1.93 m)	206 lb (93 kg)	32 1/4 in (0.82 m)	10 1/4 in (0.26 m)	6 ft 7 3/8 in (2.02 m)	4.37 s	1.49 s	2.58 s	4.17 s	6.85 s	30.5 in (0.77 m)	10 ft 4 in (3.15 m)	15 reps
All values from NFL Combine/Pro Day

=== Green Bay Packers ===
==== 2018 ====
Valdes-Scantling was selected by the Green Bay Packers with the 174th overall pick in the fifth round of the 2018 NFL draft. He signed his rookie contract on May 7, 2018. He made his NFL debut in the Packers' season opener against the Chicago Bears on September 9, 2018, recording a 21-yard kick return in the 24–23 victory. He recorded his first professional reception in the following game against the Minnesota Vikings. He started his first career game in place of the injured Randall Cobb in a Week 4 win over the Buffalo Bills, catching one pass for 38 yards. Still starting in place of Cobb during a Week 5 loss to the Detroit Lions, Valdes-Scantling had a breakout performance, notching seven receptions for 68 yards and a touchdown. He followed that up with a three-catch, 103-yard performance during a Week 6 win over the San Francisco 49ers. On October 28, 2018, in a 27–29 loss to the Los Angeles Rams, he had two receptions for 45 yards, including a 40-yard receiving touchdown. The following week, a 17–31 loss to the New England Patriots, he had three receptions for 101 yards. Overall, he finished his rookie season with 38 receptions for 581 receiving yards and two receiving touchdowns. He finished seventh among rookies in receiving yards.

==== 2019 ====
In Week 3 against the Denver Broncos, Valdes-Scantling caught six passes for 99 yards and his first receiving touchdown of the season as the Packers won 27–16. During Week 7 against the Oakland Raiders, Valdes-Scantling finished with two catches for 133 receiving yards, including a 74-yard touchdown as the Packers won 42–24. Overall, Valdes-Scantling finished the 2019 season with 26 receptions for 452 receiving yards and two receiving touchdowns.

==== 2020 ====
In Week 1 against the Vikings, Valdes-Scantling caught four passes for 96 yards and his first touchdown of the season during the 43–34 win. In Week 9 against the 49ers on Thursday Night Football, he had two receptions for 53 receiving yards and two touchdowns in the 34–17 victory. In Week 10, against the Jacksonville Jaguars, he had four receptions for 149 receiving yards, including a 78-yard receiving touchdown, during the 24–20 win. In Week 11 against the Indianapolis Colts, Valdes-Scantling recorded a key 47-yard catch on a late fourth quarter drive that resulted in a game-tying field goal by Mason Crosby. However, he also lost a fumble on the Packers' second play in overtime, allowing the Colts to kick the game-winning field goal. Valdes-Scantling later tweeted that he received death threats after the game.

In the NFC Championship against the Tampa Bay Buccaneers, Valdes-Scantling recorded four catches for 115 yards and a touchdown during the 31–26 loss.

==== 2021 ====
Valdes-Scantling was placed on injured reserve on October 2, 2021. He was activated from injured reserve on November 6, 2021. In Week 11, against the Vikings, he had four receptions for 123 yards and a touchdown in the 34–31 loss. He finished the 2021 season with 26 receptions for 430 receiving yards and three receiving touchdowns.

=== Kansas City Chiefs ===
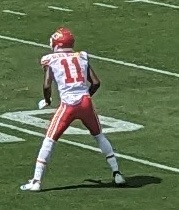
Valdes-Scantling with the Kansas City Chiefs in 2023

On March 24, 2022, Valdes-Scantling signed a three-year, $30 million contract with the Kansas City Chiefs. In Week 7, against the 49ers, he had three receptions for 111 yards in the 44–23 victory. In the 2022 regular season, he had 42 receptions for 687 receiving yards and two receiving touchdowns in 17 games, of which he started 11. In the AFC Championship Game, Valdes-Scantling caught six passes for 116 yards and a touchdown helping the Chiefs defeat the Cincinnati Bengals 23–20. Valdes-Scantling won his first Super Bowl championship in the 38–35 victory over the Philadelphia Eagles in Super Bowl LVII. He was targeted once with no receptions in the game.

Valdes-Scantling caught a career-low 21 passes for 315 yards and just one touchdown in the 2023 regular season. In the AFC Championship Game against the Baltimore Ravens, Valdes-Scantling caught a 32-yard pass on third down right before the two-minute warning, allowing the Chiefs to run out the rest of the clock and beat the Ravens 17–10. In Super Bowl LVIII, Valdes-Scantling had three receptions for 20 yards and a touchdown in the Chiefs' 25–22 overtime victory over the San Francisco 49ers. On February 28, 2024, he was released.

=== Buffalo Bills ===
On May 14, 2024, Valdes-Scantling signed a one-year contract with the Buffalo Bills. On October 15, following the Bills' acquisition of wide receiver Amari Cooper in a trade with the Cleveland Browns, Valdes-Scantling was released. While with the Bills, Valdes-Scantling caught two passes for 26 yards on nine targets.

=== New Orleans Saints ===
On October 22, 2024, Valdes-Scantling signed with the New Orleans Saints. In Week 10 against the Falcons, he had three receptions for 109 yards and two touchdowns. In his time with the Bills and the Saints, he totaled 19 receptions for 411 yards and four touchdowns.

=== Seattle Seahawks ===
On March 12, 2025, Valdes-Scantling signed a one-year, $5.5 million contract with the Seattle Seahawks. He was released on August 26 as part of final roster cuts.

=== San Francisco 49ers ===
On August 27, 2025, Valdes-Scantling signed with the San Francisco 49ers' practice squad. He was promoted to the active roster on September 3. On October 17, Valdes-Scantling was placed on injured reserve due to a calf injury, and released the next day.

=== Pittsburgh Steelers (first stint) ===
On November 4, 2025, Valdes-Scantling signed with the Pittsburgh Steelers' practice squad. This reunited him with Aaron Rodgers, his former quarterback during his tenure in Green Bay. He was promoted to the active roster on December 15. On that same day, he scored a 19-yard receiving touchdown in the 28-15 win over the Miami Dolphins. He finished the 2025 season with 14 receptions for 120 yards and one touchdown.

=== Dallas Cowboys ===
On April 27, 2026, Valdes-Scantling was signed to a one-year contract by the Dallas Cowboys. On August 30, he was released by the Cowboys as part of final roster cuts.

=== Los Angeles Chargers ===
On September 15, 2026, Valdes-Scantling signed with the Los Angeles Chargers' practice squad. He was promoted to the active roster on September 23. He was released on October 17.

=== Pittsburgh Steelers (second stint) ===
On October 20, Valdes-Scantling signed to the Steelers practice squad.

== NFL career statistics ==
Legend
	Won the Super Bowl
	Led the league
**Bold**	Career high

=== Regular season ===
Year	Team	Games		Receiving					Rushing					Fumbles	
Year	Team	GP	GS	Rec	Yds	Avg	Lng	TD	Att	Yds	Avg	Lng	TD	Fum	Lost
2018	GB	16	10	38	581	15.3	60	2	2	**29**	**14.5**	**21**	0	0	0
2019	GB	16	10	26	452	17.4	74	2	2	9	4.5	9	0	0	0
2020	GB	16	**12**	33	**690**	20.9	**78**	**6**	**4**	13	3.3	9	0	**1**	**1**
2021	GB	11	7	26	430	16.5	75	3	0	0	0.0	0	0	0	0
2022	KC	**17**	11	**42**	687	16.4	57	2	1	−3	−3.0	−3	0	0	0
2023	KC	16	10	21	315	15.0	46	1	0	0	0.0	0	0	**1**	**1**
2024	BUF	6	0	2	26	13.0	19	0	0	0	0.0	0	0	0	0
2024	NO	8	8	17	385	**22.6**	71	4	1	4	4.0	4	0	0	0
2025	SF	5	0	4	40	10.0	19	0	0	0	0.0	0	0	0	0
2025	PIT	5	1	10	80	8.0	19	1	0	0	0.0	0	0	**1**	0
2026	LAC	3	1	2	22	11.0	13	0	0	0	0.0	0	0	0	0
Career		119	70	221	3,708	16.8	78	21	10	52	5.2	21	0	3	2

=== Postseason ===
Year	Team	Games		Receiving					Fumbles	
Year	Team	GP	GS	Rec	Yds	Avg	Lng	TD	Fum	Lost
2019	GB	2	0	1	8	8.0	8	0	0	0
2020	GB	2	2	**8**	**148**	**18.5**	**50**	1	0	0
2022	KC	3	2	7	122	17.4	29	**2**	0	0
2023	KC	4	3	**8**	128	16.0	32	1	0	0
2025	PIT	1	0	3	26	8.7	14	0	0	0
Career		12	7	27	432	16.0	50	4	0	0
