= Keke Coutee =

American football player (born 1997)

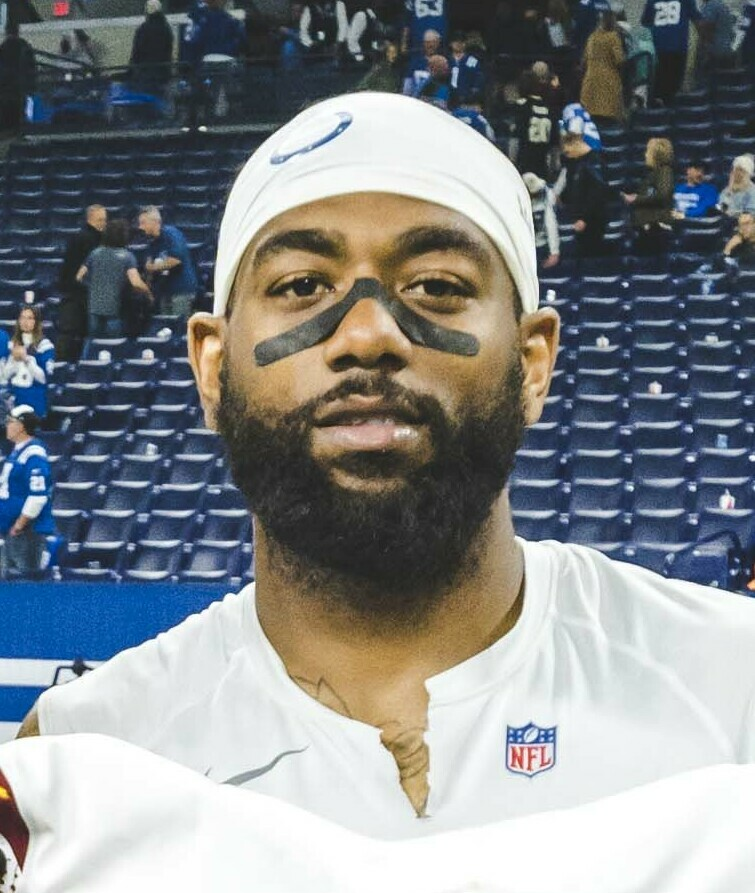
- Coutee with the Indianapolis Colts in 2022

Profile
- Position: Wide receiver

Personal information
- Born: January 14, 1997 (age 29); Lufkin, Texas, U.S.
- Listed height: 5 ft 10 in (1.78 m)
- Listed weight: 179 lb (81 kg)

Career information
- High school: Lufkin (TX)
- College: Texas Tech (2015–2017)
- NFL draft: 2018: 4th round, 103rd overall pick

Career history
- Houston Texans (2018–2020); Indianapolis Colts (2021–2022); New Orleans Saints (2023)*; Miami Dolphins (2023)*; DC Defenders (2024–2026)
- * Offseason or practice squad member only

Awards and highlights
- First-team All-Big 12 (2017)

Career NFL statistics
- Receptions: 85
- Receiving yards: 966
- Receiving touchdowns: 4
- Rushing yards: 14
- Rushing touchdowns: 1
- Return yards: 297
- Stats at Pro Football Reference

Key'vantanie "Keke" Coutee (born January 14, 1997) is an American professional football wide receiver. He played college football at Texas Tech and has played in the National Football League (NFL) for the Houston Texans and Indianapolis Colts.

== Early life ==
Coutee attended Lufkin High School in Lufkin, Texas. As a senior at Lufkin, he caught 56 passes for 841 yards. Coutee originally committed in June 2013 to play college football for the Texas Longhorns, but he de-committed in January 2014. He then committed to the Texas Tech Red Raiders in January 2015. He committed to Texas Tech over Oklahoma, Texas, Louisville, Houston, and Tulsa.

== College career ==
As a true freshman at Texas Tech, Coutee played in all 13 games, making two starts, catching 11 passes for 105 yards.

Coutee broke out as a sophomore in 2016. He played in all 12 of Texas Tech's games, catching 55 passes for 890 yards and seven touchdowns, making him Texas Tech's second-leading receiver.

Coutee's breakout as a Red Raider continued as a junior in 2017. In 13 games, he caught 93 passes for 1,429 yards and 10 touchdowns, plus a 92-yard kick return against Baylor. Coutee's 1,429 receiving yards ranks second in school history for a single season behind Michael Crabtree's 1,962 in 2007. After the season, Coutee declared for the 2018 NFL draft.

=== College statistics ===
Year	Team	Receiving					Rushing					Returns			
Year	Team	Rec	Yds	Avg	Lng	TD	Att	Yds	Avg	Lng	TD	Ret	Yds	TD	Lng
2015	Texas Tech	11	105	9.5	23	0	0	0	0	0	0	0	0	0	0
2016	Texas Tech	55	890	16.2	80	7	3	2	0.7	6	1	7	81	0	24
2017	Texas Tech	93	1,429	15.1	77	10	5	15	3.0	11	0	8	253	1	92
Career		159	2,424	15.2	80	17	7	15	2.1	11	1	14	350	1	92

== Professional career ==
Pre-draft measurables
Height	Weight	Arm length	Hand span	Wingspan	40-yard dash	10-yard split	20-yard split	20-yard shuttle	Three-cone drill	Vertical jump	Broad jump	Bench press
5 ft 9 3/4 in (1.77 m)	181 lb (82 kg)	29 7/8 in (0.76 m)	8 3/8 in (0.21 m)	5 ft 10 5/8 in (1.79 m)	4.43 s	1.53 s	2.61 s	4.15 s	6.93 s	34.5 in (0.88 m)	9 ft 5 in (2.87 m)	14 reps
All values from NFL Combine

=== Houston Texans ===
Coutee was selected by the Houston Texans in the fourth round with the 103rd overall pick in the 2018 NFL draft. The team signed Coutee on May 11 to a four-year contract.

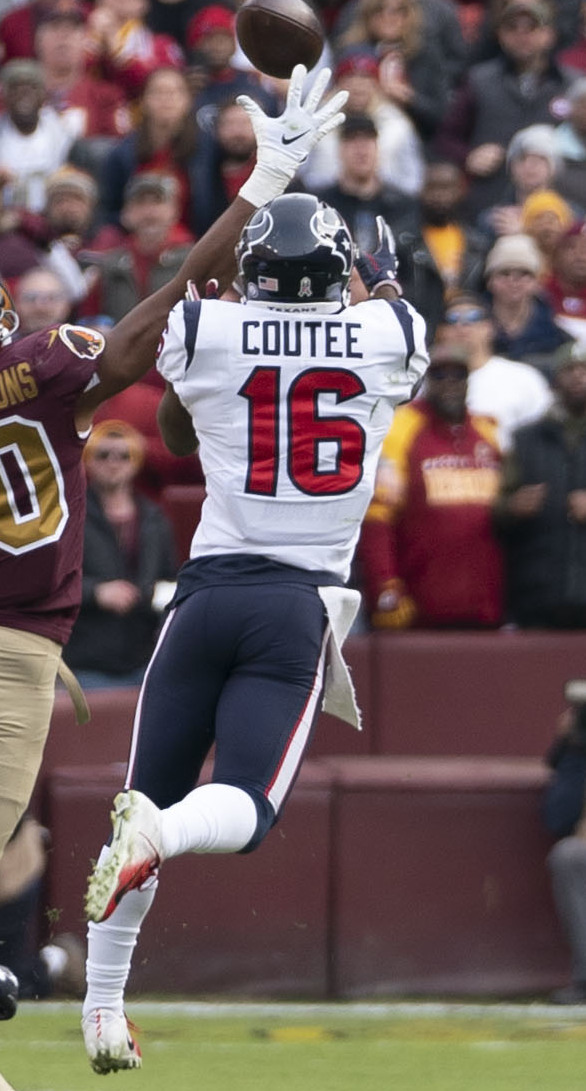
Coutee in 2018

Coutee missed the first three games of the 2018 season with a hamstring injury. Coutee made his NFL debut in Week 4 against the Indianapolis Colts. He finished the game with 11 receptions for 109 yards. Coutee's 11 receptions are the most receptions in a debut since the AFL–NFL merger. On Sunday Night Football, in a 19–16 overtime victory over the Dallas Cowboys in Week 5, Coutee caught his first NFL touchdown on a one-yard pass from Deshaun Watson. He finished the game with six receptions for 51 yards and a touchdown.

On January 5, 2019, in Houston's wild card round playoff loss to the Indianapolis Colts, Coutee hauled in 11 passes for 110 yards and a touchdown.

In Week 13 of the 2020 season against the Indianapolis Colts, Coutee recorded eight catches for 141 yards during the 26–20 loss. In Week 15 of the 2020 season against the Colts, Coutee had 5 receptions for 53 receiving yards and a touchdown. He also fumbled on the goal line in the closing seconds of the game, which allowed the Colts to take over and kneel out the clock.

On August 31, 2021, Coutee was waived by the Texans.

=== Indianapolis Colts ===
On September 2, 2021, Coutee signed with the Indianapolis Colts' practice squad. He signed a reserve/future contract with Indianapolis on January 10, 2022. On August 30, Coutee was released by the Colts and re-signed to the practice squad the next day. He was signed to the active roster on October 15. Coutee was released on December 13, and later re-signed to the practice squad. His practice squad contract with the team expired after the season on January 8, 2023.

=== New Orleans Saints ===
On June 15, 2023, Coutee signed with the New Orleans Saints. The Saints released him on August 11.

=== Miami Dolphins ===
On August 13, 2023, Coutee signed with the Miami Dolphins. He was released by the Dolphins on August 28.

=== DC Defenders ===
On February 25, 2024, Coutee signed with the DC Defenders of the United Football League (UFL). On February 6, 2026, Coutee re-signed with the Defenders. He was not retained for the 2027 season.

== NFL career statistics ==
=== Regular season ===
Year	Team	Games		Receiving					Rushing					Fumbles	
Year	Team	GP	GS	Rec	Yds	Avg	Lng	TD	Att	Yds	Avg	Lng	TD	Fum	Lost
2018	HOU	6	2	28	287	10.3	40	1	3	0	0	3	0	0	0
2019	HOU	9	4	22	254	11.5	51	0	2	14	7.0	10	1	1	1
2020	HOU	5	2	17	203	11.9	64	2	0	0	0	0	0	2	2
2021	IND	2	0	1	5	5.0	5	0	0	0	0	0	0	0	0
2022	IND	8	0	1	20	20.0	20	0	0	0	0	0	0	0	0
Career		33	10	85	966	11.4	64	3	5	14	2.8	10	1	3	3

=== Postseason ===
Year	Team	Games		Receiving					Rushing					Fumbles	
Year	Team	GP	GS	Rec	Yds	Avg	Lng	TD	Att	Yds	Avg	Lng	TD	Fum	Lost
2018	HOU	1	1	11	110	10.0	20	1	0	0	0	0	0	0	0
Career		1	1	11	110	10.0	20	1	0	0	0	3	0	0	0
