= 2017 Temple Owls football team =

American college football season

2017 Temple Owls football

Gasparilla Bowl champion

Gasparilla Bowl, W 28–3 vs. FIU
- Conference: American Athletic Conference
- East Division
- Record: 7–6 (4–4 The American)
- Head coach: Geoff Collins (1st season)
- Offensive coordinator: Dave Patenaude (1st season)
- Offensive scheme: Pro spread
- Defensive coordinator: Taver Johnson (1st season)
- Base defense: 4–3
- Home stadium: Lincoln Financial Field

2017 American Athletic Conference football standings
| | Conf. | | | Overall |
| Team | W | | L | W | | L |
|---|---|---|---|---|---|---|
East Division
| No. 6 UCF xy$ | 8 | – | 0 | 13 | – | 0 |
| No. 21 South Florida | 6 | – | 2 | 10 | – | 2 |
| Temple | 4 | – | 4 | 7 | – | 6 |
| Cincinnati | 2 | – | 6 | 4 | – | 8 |
| UConn | 2 | – | 6 | 3 | – | 9 |
| East Carolina | 2 | – | 6 | 3 | – | 9 |
West Division
| No. 25 Memphis xy | 7 | – | 1 | 10 | – | 3 |
| Houston | 5 | – | 3 | 7 | – | 5 |
| Navy | 4 | – | 4 | 7 | – | 6 |
| SMU | 4 | – | 4 | 7 | – | 6 |
| Tulane | 3 | – | 5 | 5 | – | 7 |
| Tulsa | 1 | – | 7 | 2 | – | 10 |
Championship: UCF 62, Memphis 55
$ – Conference champion; x – Division champion/co-champions; y – Championship game participant; As of January 9, 2018; Rankings from AP Poll.

The 2017 Temple Owls football team represented Temple University in the 2017 NCAA Division I FBS football season. The Owls were led by first-year head coach Geoff Collins and played their home games at Lincoln Financial Field. They were members of the East Division of the American Athletic Conference. They finished the season 7–6, 4–4 in AAC play to finish in third place in the East Division. They were invited to the Gasparilla Bowl where they defeated FIU.

== Schedule ==
| Date | Time | Opponent | Site | TV | Result | Attendance |
|---|---|---|---|---|---|---|
| September 2 | 3:30 p.m. | at Notre Dame* | Notre Dame Stadium; South Bend, IN | NBC | L 16–49 | 77,622 |
| September 9 | 3:30 p.m. | No. 6 (FCS) Villanova* | Lincoln Financial Field; Philadelphia, PA (Mayor's Cup) | ESPN3 | W 16–13 | 35,117 |
| September 15 | 7:00 p.m. | Massachusetts* | Lincoln Financial Field; Philadelphia, PA | ESPNU | W 29–21 | 22,911 |
| September 21 | 7:30 p.m. | at No. 21 South Florida | Raymond James Stadium; Tampa, FL | ESPN | L 7–43 | 24,325 |
| September 30 | 12:00 p.m. | Houston | Lincoln Financial Field; Philadelphia, PA | ESPNU | L 13–20 | 24,024 |
| October 7 | 12:00 p.m. | at East Carolina | Dowdy–Ficklen Stadium; Greenville, NC | ESPNU | W 34–10 | 31,326 |
| October 14 | 12:00 p.m. | UConn^{†} | Lincoln Financial Field; Philadelphia, PA | ESPNews | L 24–28 | 29,849 |
| October 21 | 12:00 p.m. | at Army* | Michie Stadium; West Point, NY | CBSSN | L 28–31 ^{OT} | 34,876 |
| November 2 | 8:00 p.m. | Navy | Lincoln Financial Field; Philadelphia, PA | ESPN | W 34–26 | 26,127 |
| November 10 | 7:00 p.m. | at Cincinnati | Nippert Stadium; Cincinnati, OH | ESPN2 | W 35–24 | 22,773 |
| November 18 | 12:00 p.m. | No. 14 UCF | Lincoln Financial Field; Philadelphia, PA | ESPNU | L 19–45 | 25,877 |
| November 25 | 4:00 p.m. | at Tulsa | H. A. Chapman Stadium; Tulsa, OK | ESPNews | W 43–22 | 17,032 |
| December 21 | 8:00 p.m. | vs. FIU* | Tropicana Field; St. Petersburg, FL (Gasparilla Bowl) | ESPN | W 28–3 | 16,363 |
*Non-conference game; ^{†}Homecoming; Rankings from AP Poll released prior to game; All times are in Eastern time

== Personnel ==
=== Coaching staff ===
| Name | Position | Joined Staff |
|---|---|---|
| Geoff Collins | Head coach | 2017 |
| Dave Patenaude | Offensive coordinator / quarterbacks | 2017 |
| Taver Johnson | Defensive coordinator | 2017 |
| Ed Foley | Tight ends / Special Teams | 2008 |
| Tony Lucas | Running backs | 2017 |
| Stan Hixon | Wide receivers | 2017 |
| Chris Wiesehan | offensive line | 2014 |
| Andrew Thacker | Linebackers | 2017 |
| Jim Panagos | Defensive line | 2017 |
| Cory Robinson | Defensive backs | 2017 |
| Tim Conner | Offensive Analyst | 2017 |
| Josh Linam | Defensive Analyst | 2017 |
| David Feeley | Head Strength & Conditioning Coach | 2017 |
| Adam DiMichele | Offensive Quality Control/Recruiting | 2014 |

=== Roster ===
2017 Temple Owls football team roster
Players
Coaches
Offense

| Pos. | # | Name | Class |
|---|---|---|---|
| FB | 4 | Nick Sharga | Sr |
| WR | 5 | Keith Kirkwood | Sr |
| RB | 7 | Ryquell Armstead | Jr |
| QB | 12 | Logan Marchi | So |
| WR | 13 | Isaiah Wright | So |
| JR | 14 | Brodrick Yancy | Jr |
| QB | 15 | Anthony Russo | Fr |
| QB | 16 | Todd Centeio | Fr |
| WR | 17 | Adonis Jennings | Sr |
| QB | 18 | Frank Nutile | Jr |
| WR | 19 | Ventell Bryant | Jr |
| RB | 21 | Jager Gardner | Jr |
| RB | 24 | David Hood | Jr |
| WR | 25 | Travis Hines | Fr |
| WR | 26 | Travon Williams | So |
| WR | 27 | Marshall Ellick | Jr |
| WR | 29 | Jeremy Jennings | Fr |
| WR | 30 | Eric Kiewlak | Fr |
| RB | 31 | Mark DeRobertis | Fr |
| RB | 34 | Booker McLean | Jr |
| RB | 34 | Tyliek Raynor | Fr |
| WR | 38 | Anthony Cruz | So |
| RB | 39 | Jonny Forrest | Fr |
| WR | 41 | Thomas Mattioni | Fr |
| TE | 42 | Taiyir Wilson | Fr |
| WR | 43 | L. J. Holder | Fr |
| FB | 45 | Rob Ritrovato | Jr |
| WR | 47 | T. J. Backer | So |
| TE | 48 | Steve Petrick | Fr |
| OL | 50 | Griffin Sestili | Fr |
| OL | 53 | Leon Johnson | Sr |
| OL | 55 | Brian Carter | Sr |
| OL | 58 | Matt Hennessy | Fr |
| OL | 61 | Vaughn Fulton | Jr |
| OL | 62 | Nick Apostolu | Jr |
| OL | 63 | Gordon Thomas | Jr |
| OL | 65 | Andrew Eisenson | Fr |
| OL | 66 | Leon Pinto | Fr |
| OL | 69 | Adrian Sullivan | Sr |
| OL | 70 | Jovahn Fair | So |
| OL | 71 | Benson Israel | So |
| OL | 72 | Carrington Jones | Fr |
| OL | 74 | James McHale | Jr |
| OL | 75 | Darian Bryant | Fr |
| OL | 76 | Vincent Picozzi | Fr |
| OL | 77 | Jaelin Robinson | Jr |
| OL | 78 | Aaron Ruff | Jr |
| OL | 79 | Cole Boozer | Sr |
| WR | 80 | Freddie Johnson | Fr |
| WR | 81 | Randle Jones | So |
| TE | 82 | Jake Robinson | So |
| TE | 83 | Domenic Nigrelli | Sr |
| TE | 84 | Kenny Yeboah | Fr |
| TE | 85 | Chris Myarick | Jr |
| WR | 86 | Jadan Blue | Fr |
| TE | 87 | Emil Moody | Fr |
| WR | 88 | Branden Mack | Fr |
| WR | 89 | John Ruza | Jr |

Defense

| Pos. | # | Name | Class |
|---|---|---|---|
| DB | 2 | Delvon Randall | Jr |
| DB | 3 | Sean Chandler | Jr |
| DL | 6 | Sharif Finch | Sr |
| DB | 8 | Artel Foster | Sr |
| DL | 9 | Jacob Martin | Sr |
| DB | 10 | Mike Jones | Sr |
| DB | 11 | Linwood Crump | So |
| DB | 12 | Kareem Ali | So |
| DB | 15 | CeQuan Jefferson | Sr |
| LB | 19 | Jeremiah Atoki | So |
| DB | 20 | Keyvone Bruton | So |
| DB | 21 | Derrek Thomas | Jr |
| LB | 22 | Chapelle Russell | So |
| LB | 23 | Shaun Bradley | So |
| DB | 24 | Kimere Brown | Fr |
| DB | 25 | Amir Tyler | Fr |
| DB | 26 | Christian Martir | So |
| DB | 27 | Peyton Jones | Fr |
| DB | 28 | Jyquis Thomas | Jr |
| DL | 30 | Zack Mesday | Jr |
| DB | 31 | Collin Washington | Fr |
| DB | 32 | Benny Walls | So |
| DB | 33 | Aaron Adu | Fr |
| DB | 33 | Josh Allen | Fr |
| LB | 35 | William Kwenkeu | So |
| LB | 36 | Sam Franklin | So |
| LB | 37 | Isaiah Graham-Mobley | Fr |
| LB | 38 | Aidan Rosa | Fr |
| DB | 39 | George Reid | Fr |
| LB | 40 | Todd Jones | Jr |
| DB | 41 | Christian Braswell | Fr |
| LB | 44 | Jared Folks | Jr |
| DL | 46 | Casey Williams | Fr |
| DB | 47 | Ty Mason | Fr |
| LB | 49 | Chris Smith | Sr |
| LB | 50 | Sam Kramer | Fr |
| DL | 51 | Dana Levine | So |
| LB | 52 | Audley Isaacs | Fr |
| LB | 53 | Kevin DeCaesar | So |
| LB | 54 | Mike DiFrancesco | So |
| LB | 55 | Boaz Pogue | Fr |
| DL | 56 | Rob Chandler | Jr |
| LB | 59 | Shaun Gabriel | So |
| DL | 60 | Greg Webb | Sr |
| DL | 72 | Karamo Dioubate | So |
| DL | 88 | Ifeanyi Meijah | Fr |
| DL | 90 | Quincy Roche | Fr |
| DL | 91 | Malik Burns | Fr |
| DL | 93 | DeAndre Kelly | So |
| DL | 94 | Jullian Taylor | Sr |
| DL | 95 | Daniel Archibong | Fr |
| DL | 96 | Hez Trahan | Jr |
| DL | 97 | Arnold Ebiketie | Fr |
| DL | 98 | Michael Dogbe | Jr |
| DL | 99 | Freddie Booth-Lloyd | Jr |

Special teams

| Pos. | # | Name | Class |
|---|---|---|---|
| P | 18 | Connor Bowler | Fr |
| K | 29 | Austin Jones | Sr |
| P | 43 | Alex Starzyk | Sr |
| LS | 46 | Cole Lerch | Fr |
| LS | 57 | Josh Lang | Sr |
| LS | 59 | Corey Lerch | Sr |
| P | 83 | Max Cavallucci | Fr |
| P | 92 | Drew Levin | Fr |
| K | 97 | Aaron Boumehri | So |
| K | 99 | Will Mobley | Fr |

Head coach

- Geoff Collins

Coordinators/assistant coaches

Legend

- (C) Team captain
- (S) Suspended
- (I) Ineligible
- Injured
- Redshirt

=== 2017 recruiting class ===
College recruiting (2017)
| Name | Hometown | School | Height | Weight | Commit date |
|---|---|---|---|---|---|
| Todd Centeio; QB | West Palm Beach, Florida | Dwyer High School | 6 ft 0 in (1.83 m) | 205 lb (93 kg) | Jun 3, 2016 |
| Todd Centeio; QB | Recruit ratings: Scout: Rivals: 247Sports: ESPN: | | | | |
| Griffin Sestili; OL | Sewickley, Pennsylvania | North Allegheny High School | 6 ft 3 in (1.91 m) | 260 lb (120 kg) | Jun 1, 2016 |
| Griffin Sestili; OL | Recruit ratings: Scout: Rivals: 247Sports: | | | | |
| Malik Burns; DE | Marbury, Maryland | Lackey High School | 6 ft 3 in (1.91 m) | 230 lb (100 kg) | Jan 14, 2017 |
| Malik Burns; DE | Recruit ratings: Scout: Rivals: 247Sports: | | | | |
| Audley Isaacs; LB | Philadelphia | Valley Forge Military Academy | 6 ft 1 in (1.85 m) | 215 lb (98 kg) | May 6, 2016 |
| Audley Isaacs; LB | Recruit ratings: Scout: Rivals: 247Sports: | | | | |
| Jeremy Jennings; WR | Downingtown, Pennsylvania | Downingtown East High School | 5 ft 10 in (1.78 m) | 180 lb (82 kg) | Jun 20, 2016 |
| Jeremy Jennings; WR | Recruit ratings: Scout: Rivals: 247Sports: ESPN: | | | | |
| Emil Moody; TE | Philadelphia | Neumann Goretti High School | 6 ft 5 in (1.96 m) | 210 lb (95 kg) | Oct 8, 2016 |
| Emil Moody; TE | Recruit ratings: Scout: Rivals: 247Sports: | | | | |
| Jadan Blue; WR | Baltimore | Peddie School | 6 ft 0 in (1.83 m) | 175 lb (79 kg) | Oct 24, 2016 |
| Jadan Blue; WR | Recruit ratings: Scout: Rivals: 247Sports: | | | | |
| Arnold Ebiketie; DL | Silver Spring, Maryland | Albert Einstein High School | 6 ft 4 in (1.93 m) | 200 lb (91 kg) | Jan 22, 2017 |
| Arnold Ebiketie; DL | Recruit ratings: Scout: Rivals: 247Sports: | | | | |
| Christian Braswell; DB | Washington, D.C. | Friendship Collegiate Academy | 5 ft 10 in (1.78 m) | 161 lb (73 kg) | Jan 28, 2017 |
| Christian Braswell; DB | Recruit ratings: Scout: Rivals: 247Sports: | | | | |
| Ifeanyi Maijeh; DL | Rockaway, New York | Poly Prep | 6 ft 2 in (1.88 m) | 261 lb (118 kg) | Jan 28, 2017 |
| Ifeanyi Maijeh; DL | Recruit ratings: Scout: Rivals: 247Sports: | | | | |
| George Reid; DB | Glenside, Pennsylvania | Abington High School | 6 ft 2 in (1.88 m) | 180 lb (82 kg) | Jun 28, 2016 |
| George Reid; DB | Recruit ratings: Scout: Rivals: 247Sports: | | | | |
| Collin Washington; DB | Philadelphia | Central High School | 6 ft 1 in (1.85 m) | 185 lb (84 kg) | Jul 15, 2016 |
| Collin Washington; DB | Recruit ratings: Scout: Rivals: 247Sports: | | | | |
| James Makszin; OL | Norwalk, Connecticut | Norwalk High School | 6 ft 3 in (1.91 m) | 265 lb (120 kg) | Aug 14, 2016 |
| James Makszin; OL | Recruit ratings: Scout: Rivals: 247Sports: | | | | |
| Ty Mason; DB | Silver Spring, Maryland | James Hubert Blake High School | 5 ft 10 in (1.78 m) | 172 lb (78 kg) | Jul 1, 2016 |
| Ty Mason; DB | Recruit ratings: Scout: Rivals: 247Sports: | | | | |
| L'Jeron Holder; WR | Manalapan, New Jersey | Manalapan High School | 6 ft 3 in (1.91 m) | 202 lb (92 kg) | Aug 10, 2016 |
| L'Jeron Holder; WR | Recruit ratings: Scout: Rivals: 247Sports: | | | | |
| Mike Jones; DB | Baltimore, Maryland | North Carolina Central | 5 ft 11 in (1.80 m) | 187 lb (85 kg) | Jan 1, 2017 |
| Mike Jones; DB | Recruit ratings: No ratings found | | | | |
| Casey Williams; LB | Philadelphia | South Philadelphia High School | 6 ft 3 in (1.91 m) | 220 lb (100 kg) | Jan 30, 2016 |
| Casey Williams; LB | Recruit ratings: Scout: 247Sports: | | | | |
| Chris Jimenez; OL | Collegeville, Pennsylvania | Perkiomen Valley High School | 6 ft 5 in (1.96 m) | 260 lb (120 kg) | Jul 30, 2016 |
| Chris Jimenez; OL | Recruit ratings: Scout: Rivals: 247Sports: | | | | |
Overall recruit ranking:
Note: In many cases, Scout, Rivals, 247Sports, On3, and ESPN may conflict in their listings of height and weight.; In these cases, the average was taken. ESPN grades are on a 100-point scale.; Sources: "Temple Signee List 2017". Rivals.; "2017 Player Signees – Temple". ESPN.; "2017 Team Ranking". Rivals.com.

== Game summaries ==
=== Notre Dame ===
Temple Owls at Notre Dame Fighting Irish – Game Summary

| Quarter | 1 | 2 | 3 | 4 | Total |
|---|---|---|---|---|---|
| Owls | 3 | 7 | 0 | 6 | 16 |
| Fighting Irish | 21 | 7 | 7 | 14 | 49 |

at Notre Dame Stadium • South Bend, Indiana

- Date: September 2, 2017
- Game time: 3:30 p.m. EST, Duration: 3:17
- Game weather: Temperature: 74 °F (23 °C) • Wind: NW at 9 mph • Weather: Sunny
- Game attendance: 77,622
- Referee: Jeff Heaser • Umpire: Mark Wilson • Linesman: Joseph Griesser • Line Judge: Richard Misner • Back Judge: Jacques Hooper • Field Judge: C. Clougherty • Side Judge: Jerry Hocker • Center Judge: Larry Saunders
- TV announcers (NBC): Mike Tirico (Play–by–Play), Doug Flutie (Color Analyst), and Kathryn Tappen (Sideline)
- Sources: Game Notes and Recap/Box Score

Game information

First Quarter

- 14:27 ND – Josh Adams 37 yard run (Justin Yoon kick), Fighting Irish 7–0. Drive: 2 plays, 70 yards, TOP 0:33
- 05:50 ND – Brandon Wimbush 8 yard run (Justin Yoon kick), Fighting Irish 14–0. Drive: 7 plays, 59 yards, TOP 2:44
- 02:23 TEM – Austin Jones 36 yard field goal, Fighting Irish 14–3. Drive: 9 plays, 57 yards, TOP 3:27
- 01:13 ND – Nic Weishar 12 yard pass from Brandon Wimbush (Justin Yoon kick), Fighting Irish 21–3. Drive: 3 plays, 72 yards, TOP 1:10

Second Quarter

- 11:09 ND – ST. Brown 5 yard pass from Brandon Wimbush (Justin Yoon kick), Fighting Irish 28–3. Drive: 8 plays, 76 yards, TOP 3:40
- 06:09 TEM – Keith Kirkwood 12 yard pass from Logan Marchi (Austin Jones kick), Fighting Irish 28–10. Drive: 11 plays, 75 yards, TOP 5:00

Third Quarter

- 01:22 ND – Tony Jones Jr. 7 yard run (Justin Yoon kick), Fighting Irish 35–10. Drive: 8 plays, 80 yards, TOP 3:03

Fourth Quarter

- 12:05 TEM – Brodrick Yancy 11 yard pass from Logan Marchi (Logan Marchi pass failed), Fighting Irish 35–16. Drive: 11 plays, 70 yards, TOP 4:17
- 05:44 ND – Josh Adams 1 yard run (Justin Yoon kick), Fighting Irish 42–16. 6 plays, 34 yards, TOP 2:27
- 02:29 ND – Dexter Williams 1 yard run (Justin Yoon kick), Fighting Irish 49–16. Drive: 3 plays, 69 yards, TOP 0:53

Top Passers

- Temple – Logan Marchi 19/35, 245 yds, 2 TD
- Notre Dame – Brandon Wimbush 17/30, 184 yds, 2 TD, INT

Top Rushers

- Temple – Ryquell Armstead, 19 rushes, 67 yds
- Notre Dame – Josh Adams, 19 rushes, 161 yds, 2 TD

Top Receiving

- Temple – Isaiah Wright, 4 rec, 79 yds
- Notre Dame – ST. Brown, 4 rec, 80 yds, TD

Top Tacklers

- Temple – Delvon Randall, 11 tackles, 1 sack
- Notre Dame – Nyles Morgan, 8 tackles

=== Villanova ===
Villanova Wildcats at Temple Owls – Game Summary

| Quarter | 1 | 2 | 3 | 4 | Total |
|---|---|---|---|---|---|
| No. 6 (FCS) Wildcats | 0 | 0 | 3 | 10 | 13 |
| Owls | 3 | 7 | 3 | 3 | 16 |

at Lincoln Financial Field • Philadelphia

- Date: September 9, 2017
- Game time: 3:30 p.m. EST, Duration: 3:06
- Game weather: Temperature: 71 °F (22 °C) • Wind: NNW at 12 mph • Weather: Partly Cloudy
- Game attendance: 35,117
- Referee: Chas. Lamertina • Umpire: Ken Huffhines • Linesman: Jim Casey • Line Judge: Stephen Ray • Back Judge: James Downey • Field Judge: Mark Windham • Side Judge: Jim Smith • Center Judge: Joe Clarkson
- TV announcers (ESPN3): Greg Mescall (Play–by–Play) and Tyoka Jackson (Color Analyst)
- Sources: Game Notes and Recap/Box Score

Game information

First Quarter

- 01:13 TEM – Austin Jones 22 yard field goal, Owls 3–0. Drive: 8 plays, 68 yards, TOP 3:29

Second Quarter

- 00:01 TEM – Nick Sharga 1 yard run (Austin Jones kick), Owls 10–0. Drive: 8 plays, 75 yards, TOP 1:59

Third Quarter

- 12:01 TEM – Aaron Boumerhi 44 yard field goal, Owls 13–0. Drive: 9 plays, 46 yards, TOP 2:59
- 00:49 NOVA – Drew Kresge 44 yard field goal, Owls 13–3. Drive: 11 plays, 34 yards, TOP 6:18

Fourth Quarter

- 10:18 NOVA – Taurus Phillips 10 yard pass from Zach Bednarczyk (Drew Kresge kick), Owls 13–10. Drive: 8 plays, 91 yards, TOP 3:43
- 03:29 NOVA – Drew Kresge 34 yard field goal, Tied 13–13. Drive: 9 plays, 36 yards, TOP 4:40
- 01:00 TEM – Aaron Boumerhi 49 yard field goal, Owls 16–13. Drive: 7 plays, 42 yards, TOP 2:23

Top Passers

- Villanova – Zach Bednarczyk, 27/41, 382 yds, TD
- Temple – Logan Marchi, 20/34, 274 yds

Top Rushers

- Villanova – 11 rushes, 17 yds
- Temple – David Hood, 4 rushes, 21 yds

Top Receiving

- Villanova – Changa Hodges, 4 rec, 100 yds
- Temple – Ventell Bryant, 7 rec, 79 yds

Top Tacklers

- Villanova – Jeff Steeb, 8 tackles, 1 sack, 1 tackle-for-loss
- Temple – Chapelle Russell, 10 tackles, 1 tackle-for-loss

=== UMass ===
UMass Minutemen at Temple Owls – Game Summary

| Quarter | 1 | 2 | 3 | 4 | Total |
|---|---|---|---|---|---|
| Minutemen | 0 | 7 | 7 | 7 | 21 |
| Owls | 3 | 13 | 6 | 7 | 29 |

at Lincoln Financial Field • Philadelphia

- Date: September 15, 2017
- Game time: 7:00 p.m. EST, Duration: 3:29
- Game weather: Temperature: 71 °F (22 °C) • Wind: NNW at 12 mph • Weather: Partly Cloudy
- Game attendance: 22,911
- Referee: Charles Lewis • Umpire: Ken Huffhines • Linesman: Jeremy McCurley • Line Judge: Jake Weatherford • Back Judge: Eric Hermick • Field Judge: Ken Bushey • Side Judge: Joel Moenkhoff • Center Judge: Stephen DiSangro
- TV announcers (ESPNU): Mike Corey (Play–by–Play) and Rene Ingoglia (Color Analyst)
- Sources: Game Notes and Recap/Box Score

Game information

First Quarter

- 12:43 TEM – Austin Jones 24 yard field goal, Owls 3–0. Drive: 6 plays, 65 yards, TOP 2:17

Second Quarter

- 02:29 UMASS – Nick Orekoya 10 yard pass from Andrew Ford (Michael Schreiner kick), Minutemen 7–3. Drive: 5 plays, 64 yards, TOP 2:20
- 01:04 TEM – Adonis Jennings 30 yard pass from Logan Marchi (Austin Jones kick), Owls 10–7. Drive: 8 plays, 73 yards, TOP 1:25
- 00:10 TEM – Keith Kirkwood 11 yard pass from Logan Marchi (Austin Jones PAT failed), Owls 16–7. Drive: 3 plays, 18 yards, TOP 0:36

Third Quarter

- 10:18 TEM – Aaron Boumerhi 52 yard field goal, Owls 19–7. Drive: 9 plays, 53 yards, TOP 3:30
- 05:56 UMASS – Jessie Britt 20 yard pass from Andrew Ford (Michael Schreiner kick), Owls 19–14. Drive: 9 plays, 66 yards, TOP 4:22
- 01:52 TEM – Austin Jones 37 yard field goal, Owls 22–14. Drive: 10 plays, 44 yards, TOP 4:03

Fourth Quarter

- 03:48 TEM – Isaiah Wright 13 yard pass from Logan Marchi (Austin Jones kick), Owls 29–14. Drive: 10 plays, 72 yards, TOP 4:51
- 01:41 UMASS – Andrew Ford 3 yard run (Michael Schreiner kick), Owls 29–21. Drive: 8 plays, 67 yards, TOP 2:07

Top Passers

- Massachusetts –
- Temple –

Top Rushers

- Massachusetts –
- Temple –

Top Receiving

- Massachusetts –
- Temple –

Top Tacklers

- Massachusetts –
- Temple –

=== South Florida ===
Temple Owls at South Florida Bulls – Game Summary

| Quarter | 1 | 2 | 3 | 4 | Total |
|---|---|---|---|---|---|
| Owls | 0 | 7 | 0 | 0 | 7 |
| Bulls | 3 | 17 | 13 | 10 | 43 |

at Raymond James Stadium • Tampa, Florida

- Date: September 21, 2017
- Game time: EST, Duration: 7:30
- Game weather: Temperature: • Wind: • Weather:
- Referee: • Umpire: • Linesman: • Line Judge: • Back Judge: • Field Judge: • Side Judge: • Center Judge:
- TV announcers (ESPN): Dave Flemming, Booger McFarland, Joey Galloway, and Laura Rutledge

Game information

First Quarter
Second Quarter
Third Quarter
Fourth Quarter

Top Passers
Top Rushers
Top Receiving
Top Tacklers

=== Houston ===
Houston Cougars at Temple Owls – Game Summary

| Quarter | 1 | 2 | 3 | 4 | Total |
|---|---|---|---|---|---|
| Cougars | 7 | 6 | 7 | 0 | 20 |
| Owls | 0 | 0 | 3 | 10 | 13 |

at Lincoln Financial Field • Philadelphia

- Date: September 30, 2017
- Game time: EST, Duration: 12:00
- Game weather: Temperature: • Wind: • Weather:
- Referee: • Umpire: • Linesman: • Line Judge: • Back Judge: • Field Judge: • Side Judge: • Center Judge:
- TV announcers (ESPNU): Mike Couzens and John Congemi

Game information

First Quarter
Second Quarter
Third Quarter
Fourth Quarter

Top Passers
Top Rushers
Top Receiving
Top Tacklers

=== East Carolina ===
Temple Owls at East Carolina Pirates – Game Summary

| Quarter | 1 | 2 | 3 | 4 | Total |
|---|---|---|---|---|---|
| Owls | 0 | 24 | 7 | 3 | 34 |
| Pirates | 3 | 0 | 7 | 0 | 10 |

at Dowdy–Ficklen Stadium • Greenville, North Carolina

- Date: October 7, 2017
- Game time: EST, Duration: 12:00
- Game weather: Temperature: • Wind: • Weather:
- Referee: • Umpire: • Linesman: • Line Judge: • Back Judge: • Field Judge: • Side Judge: • Center Judge:
- TV announcers: Mike Couzens and John Congemi

Game information

First Quarter
Second Quarter
Third Quarter
Fourth Quarter

Top Passers
Top Rushers
Top Receiving
Top Tacklers

=== UConn ===
UConn Huskies at Temple Owls – Game Summary

| Quarter | 1 | 2 | 3 | 4 | Total |
|---|---|---|---|---|---|
| Huskies | 0 | 14 | 14 | 0 | 28 |
| Owls | 7 | 0 | 7 | 10 | 24 |

at Lincoln Financial Field • Philadelphia

- Date: October 14, 2017
- Game time: EST, Duration: 12:00
- Game weather: Temperature: • Wind: • Weather:
- Referee: • Umpire: • Linesman: • Line Judge: • Back Judge: • Field Judge: • Side Judge: • Center Judge:
- TV announcers (ESPNews): Bill Roth and Christian Ponder

Game information

First Quarter
Second Quarter
Third Quarter
Fourth Quarter

Top Passers
Top Rushers
Top Receiving
Top Tacklers

=== Army ===
Temple Owls at Army Black Knights – Game Summary

| Quarter | 1 | 2 | 3 | 4 | OT | Total |
|---|---|---|---|---|---|---|
| Owls | 0 | 14 | 0 | 14 | 0 | 28 |
| Black Knights | 7 | 7 | 0 | 14 | 3 | 31 |

at Michie Stadium • West Point, New York

- Date: October 21, 2017
- Game time: EST, Duration: 12:00
- Game weather: Temperature: • Wind: • Weather:
- Referee: • Umpire: • Linesman: • Line Judge: • Back Judge: • Field Judge: • Side Judge: • Center Judge:
- TV announcers (CBS Sports Network): Ben Holden, Jay Feely, and John Schriffen

Game information

First Quarter
Second Quarter
Third Quarter
Fourth Quarter

Top Passers
Top Rushers
Top Receiving
Top Tacklers

=== Navy ===
Navy Midshipmen at Temple Owls – Game Summary

| Quarter | 1 | 2 | 3 | 4 | Total |
|---|---|---|---|---|---|
| Midshipmen | 3 | 3 | 7 | 13 | 26 |
| Owls | 10 | 7 | 14 | 3 | 34 |

at Lincoln Financial Field • Philadelphia

- Date: November 2, 2017
- Game time: EST, Duration: 8:00
- Game weather: Temperature: • Wind: • Weather:
- Referee: • Umpire: • Linesman: • Line Judge: • Back Judge: • Field Judge: • Side Judge: • Center Judge:
- TV announcers (ESPN/ESPN2): Dave Flemming, Mike Golic, Mike Golic Jr., and Laura Rutledge

Game information

First Quarter
Second Quarter
Third Quarter
Fourth Quarter

Top Passers
Top Rushers
Top Receiving
Top Tacklers

=== Cincinnati ===
Temple Owls at Cincinnati Bearcats – Game Summary

| Quarter | 1 | 2 | 3 | 4 | Total |
|---|---|---|---|---|---|
| Owls | 3 | 10 | 15 | 7 | 35 |
| Bearcats | 0 | 0 | 14 | 10 | 24 |

at Nippert Stadium • Cincinnati

- Date: November 10, 2017
- Game time: EST, Duration: 7:00
- Game weather: Temperature: • Wind: • Weather:
- Referee: • Umpire: • Linesman: • Line Judge: • Back Judge: • Field Judge: • Side Judge: • Center Judge:
- TV announcers (ESPN/ESPN2): Dave LaMont, Mack Brown, and Jen Lada

Game information

First Quarter
Second Quarter
Third Quarter
Fourth Quarter

Top Passers
Top Rushers
Top Receiving
Top Tacklers

=== UCF ===
Central Florida Knights at Temple Owls – Game Summary

| Quarter | 1 | 2 | 3 | 4 | Total |
|---|---|---|---|---|---|
| No. 14 Knights | 7 | 24 | 14 | 0 | 45 |
| Owls | 3 | 10 | 0 | 6 | 19 |

at Lincoln Financial Field • Philadelphia

- Date: November 18, 2017
- Game time: EST, Duration: 12:00
- Game weather: Temperature: • Wind: • Weather:
- Referee: • Umpire: • Linesman: • Line Judge: • Back Judge: • Field Judge: • Side Judge: • Center Judge:
- TV announcers (ESPNU): Mike Couzens and John Congemi

Game information

First Quarter
Second Quarter
Third Quarter
Fourth Quarter

Top Passers
Top Rushers
Top Receiving
Top Tacklers

=== Tulsa ===
Temple Owls at Tulsa Golden Hurricane – Game Summary

| Quarter | 1 | 2 | 3 | 4 | Total |
|---|---|---|---|---|---|
| Owls | 10 | 21 | 6 | 6 | 43 |
| Golden Hurricanes | 7 | 6 | 7 | 2 | 22 |

at Skelly Field at H. A. Chapman Stadium • Tulsa, Oklahoma

- Date: November 25, 2017
- Game time: EST, Duration: 4:00
- Game weather: Temperature: • Wind: • Weather:
- Referee: • Umpire: • Linesman: • Line Judge: • Back Judge: • Field Judge: • Side Judge: • Center Judge:
- TV announcers (ESPNews): Jay Alter and Craig Haubert

Game information

First Quarter
Second Quarter
Third Quarter
Fourth Quarter

Top Passers
Top Rushers
Top Receiving
Top Tacklers

=== FIU–Gasparilla Bowl ===
Temple Owls vs. FIU Golden Panthers – Game Summary

| Quarter | 1 | 2 | 3 | 4 | Total |
|---|---|---|---|---|---|
| Owls | 0 | 7 | 7 | 14 | 28 |
| Panthers | 0 | 0 | 3 | 0 | 3 |

at Tropicana Field • St. Petersburg, FL

- Date: December 22, 2017
- Game time: EST, Duration: 8:00
- Game weather: Temperature: • Wind: • Weather:
- Referee: • Umpire: • Linesman: • Line Judge: • Back Judge: • Field Judge: • Side Judge: • Center Judge:
- TV announcers (ESPN/RedVoice): Mike Couzens, John Congemi, and Kris Budden

Game information

First Quarter
Second Quarter
Third Quarter
Fourth Quarter

Top Passers
Top Rushers
Top Receiving
Top Tacklers

== Awards and honors ==
=== American Athletic Conference All-Conference Team ===
- First Team

Delvon Randall, S

- Second Team

Brian Carter, OL
Sharif Finch, DL
Jacob Martin, DL

- Honorable Mention

Sean Chandler, S

[11]

== NFL Players ==
=== NFL Draft Combine ===
One Temple player was invited to participate in the 2018 NFL Scouting Combine.

| # | Name | POS | HT | WT | Arms | Hands | 40 | Bench Press | Vert Jump | Broad Jump | 3 Cone Drill | 20-yd Shuttle | Ref |
|---|---|---|---|---|---|---|---|---|---|---|---|---|---|
| #3 | Sean Chandler | S | 5'10 4/18" | 205 lbs | 30 6/8" | 8 2/8" | 4.65 | 16 | 34.5 | 119.0 | N/A | 4.62 | |

† Top performer

=== 2018 NFL draft ===
Following the season, the following members of the Temple football team were selected in the 2018 NFL draft.

| # | Player | Round | Pick | Position | NFL club |
|---|---|---|---|---|---|
| #9 | Jacob Martin | 6 | 186 | Defensive lineman | Seattle Seahawks |
| #94 | Jullian Taylor | 7 | 223 | Defensive lineman | San Francisco 49ers |

In addition to the draft selections above, the following Temple players signed NFL contracts after the draft.

| # | Name | POS | HT | WT | NFL club | Ref |
|---|---|---|---|---|---|---|
| #1 | Adonis Jennings | WR | 6-3 | 205 lbs | Cincinnati Bengals | |
| #3 | Sean Chandler | DB | 6-0 | 195 lbs | New York Giants | |
| #4 | Nick Sharga | FB | 6-2 | 240 lbs | Oakland Raiders | |
| #5 | Keith Kirkwood | WR | 6-3 | 220 lbs | New Orleans Saints | |
| #6 | Sharif Finch | DL | 6-5 | 250 lbs | Tennessee Titans | |
| #10 | Mike Jones | DB | 5-11 | 187 lbs | New York Giants | |
| #53 | Leon Johnson | OL | 6-5 | 325 lbs | Denver Broncos | |
| #79 | Cole Boozer | OL | 6-5 | 295 lbs | Tampa Bay Buccaneers | |
