= 2017 American Athletic Conference football season =

2017 American Athletic Conference
- League: NCAA Division I Football Bowl Subdivision
- Sport: Football
- Duration: August 31, 2017– January 2018
- Teams: 12
- TV partner(s): ABC, ESPN, ESPN2, ESPNU, CBS Sports Network

2018 NFL Draft
- Top draft pick: Mike Hughes (UCF)
- Picked by: Minnesota Vikings, 30th overall

Regular season

The American Championship

Football seasons
- 2016 2018

2017 American Athletic Conference football standings
	Conf.			Overall
Team	W		L	W		L
East Division
No. 6 UCF xy$	8	–	0	13	–	0
No. 21 South Florida	6	–	2	10	–	2
Temple	4	–	4	7	–	6
Cincinnati	2	–	6	4	–	8
UConn	2	–	6	3	–	9
East Carolina	2	–	6	3	–	9
West Division
No. 25 Memphis xy	7	–	1	10	–	3
Houston	5	–	3	7	–	5
Navy	4	–	4	7	–	6
SMU	4	–	4	7	–	6
Tulane	3	–	5	5	–	7
Tulsa	1	–	7	2	–	10
Championship: UCF 62, Memphis 55
$ – Conference champion; x – Division champion/co-champions; y – Championship game participant; As of January 9, 2018; Rankings from AP Poll.

The 2017 American Athletic Conference football season was the 26th NCAA Division I FBS Football season of the American Athletic Conference (The American). The season is the fifth since the former Big East Conference dissolved and became the American Athletic Conference, (Note: The American is the legal all-sports successor to the Big East Conference (1979–2013). The Big East was rebranded and reorganized as the American Athletic Conference on July 1, 2013.) and the fourth season with the College Football Playoff in place. The American is considered a member of the "Group of Five" (G5), (Note: The other conferences in the "Group of Five" are Conference USA (C-USA), the Mid-American Conference (MAC), the Mountain West Conference, and the Sun Belt Conference.) meaning that the conference shares with the other G5 conferences one automatic spot in the New Year's Six bowl games.

== American Athletic Conference Media Day ==
The American Athletic Conference Media Day took place July 18– in Newport, Rhode Island.

=== Preseason poll ===
East Division

1. USF (30), 180 pts
2. UCF, 126 pts
3. Temple, 119 pts
4. Cincinnati, 100 pts
5. East Carolina, 63 pts
6. UConn, 42 pts

West Division

1. Memphis (22), 169 pts
2. Houston (6), 137 pts
3. Navy (1), 128 pts
4. Tulsa (1), 102 pts
5. SMU, 64 pts
6. Tulane, 30 pts

Predicted American Championship Game Winner

1. USF (26)
2. Houston (2)
3. Memphis (1)
4. Navy (1)

== Head coaches ==
Note: All stats current through the completion of the 2016 season

Team	Head coach	Years at school	Overall record	Record at school	AAC record
Cincinnati	Luke Fickell	1	6–7 (.462)	0–0 (–)	0–0 (–)
Connecticut	Randy Edsall*	13	96–104 (.480)	74–70 (.514)	22–26 (.458)
East Carolina	Scottie Montgomery	2	3–9 (.250)	3–9 (.250)	1–7 (.125)
Houston	Major Applewhite†	1	0–1 (.000)	0–1 (.000)	0–0 (–)
Memphis	Mike Norvell	2	8–5 (.615)	8–5 (.615)	5–3 (.625)
Navy	Ken Niumatalolo	10	77–42 (.647)	77–42 (.647)	14–2 (.875)
SMU	Chad Morris	3	7–17 (.292)	7–17 (.292)	4–12 (.250)
South Florida	Charlie Strong	1	60–38 (.612)	7-1 (.875)	24–10 (.706)
Temple	Geoff Collins	1	0–0 (–)	0–0 (–)	0–0 (–)
Tulane	Willie Fritz	2	22–15 (.595)	4–8 (.333)	1–7 (.125)
Tulsa	Philip Montgomery	3	16–10 (.615)	16–10 (.615)	9–7 (.563)
UCF	Scott Frost	2	6–7 (.462)	6–7 (.462)	4–4 (.500)

* Randy Edsall coached UConn from 1999–2010, and is returning in 2017. UConn was a member of the Big East from 2004–2012.
† Major Applewhite was hired to replace Tom Herman in December 2016 at Houston and coached the Cougars in their 2016 bowl game.

== Recruiting classes ==
Rankings
Team	ESPN	Rivals	Scout	24/7	Signees
Cincinnati	75	60	62	68	23
Connecticut	–	96	102	106	19
East Carolina	–	71	88	75	22
Houston	62	76	72	72	19
Memphis	64	62	64	55	28
Navy	–	76	86	79	49
SMU	–	84	93	80	18
South Florida	71	69	95	67	20
Temple	–	–	126	107	18
Tulane	–	89	104	99	26
Tulsa	–	79	85	91	23
UCF	68	53	63	49	23

== Rankings ==
Legend
	Improvement in ranking
	Drop in ranking
	Not ranked previous week
	No change in ranking from previous week
RV	Received votes but were not ranked in Top 25 of poll
()	Received first place votes

		Pre	Wk 2	Wk 3	Wk 4	Wk 5	Wk 6	Wk 7	Wk 8	Wk 9	Wk 10	Wk 11	Wk 12	Wk 13	Wk 14	Wk 15	Final
Cincinnati	AP																
Cincinnati	C																
Cincinnati	CFP	Not released															
Connecticut	AP																
Connecticut	C																
Connecticut	CFP	Not released															
East Carolina	AP																
East Carolina	C																
East Carolina	CFP	Not released															
Houston	AP	RV	RV	RV	RV												
Houston	C	RV	RV	RV	RV												
Houston	CFP	Not released															
Memphis	AP				RV	RV	RV	RV	25	24	22	20	18	17	16	19	25
Memphis	C	RV	RV	RV	RV	RV	RV	RV	RV	RV	21	19	17	16	14	18	24
Memphis	CFP	Not released									23	22	21	20	20	20	
Navy	AP		RV				RV	25	RV								
Navy	C		RV	RV	RV	RV	RV	24	RV	RV	RV						
Navy	CFP	Not released															
SMU	AP																
SMU	C																
SMU	CFP	Not released															
South Florida	AP	19	21	22	21	18	18	18	16	17	RV	22	23	22	23	23	21
South Florida	C	21	20	21	17	17	16	15	13	14	23	21	20	19	23	24	21
South Florida	CFP	Not released															
Temple	AP																
Temple	C	RV															
Temple	CFP	Not released															
Tulane	AP																
Tulane	C																
Tulane	CFP	Not released															
Tulsa	AP	RV															
Tulsa	C	RV															
Tulsa	CFP	Not released															
UCF	AP					RV	25	22	20	18	15	14	14	13	12	10	6 (4)
UCF	C			RV		RV	25	21	20	17	14	12	12	12	11	10	7
UCF	CFP	Not released									18	18	15	15	14	12	

== Schedule ==
The conference's schedule was released on February 9, 2017. The regular season began on August 27, 2017, when South Florida visits San Jose State. The first conference games played on September 9. The conference season ended with the AAC Championship game on December 2, 2017.

Index to colors and formatting
American member won
American member loss
American teams in **bold**

=== Week 1 ===
Date	Time	Visiting team	Home team	Site	TV	Result	Attendance	Ref.
August 26	7:30 p.m.	No. 19 **South Florida**	San Jose State	CEFCU Stadium • San Jose, CA	CBSSN	**W** 42–22	13,377	
August 31	6:00 p.m.	FIU	**UCF**	Spectrum Stadium • Orlando, FL	CBSSN	**W** 61–17	38,063	
August 31	7:00 p.m.	Austin Peay	**Cincinnati**	Nippert Stadium • Cincinnati, OH	ESPN3	**W** 26–14	30,831	
August 31	7:30 p.m.	Holy Cross	**Connecticut**	Rentschler Field • East Hartford, CT	SNY	**W** 27–20	24,435	
August 31	7:30 p.m.	**Tulsa**	No. 10 Oklahoma State	Boone Pickens Stadium • Stillwater, OK	FS1	**L** 24–59	56,790	
August 31	9:00 p.m.	Louisiana–Monroe	**Memphis**	Liberty Bowl Memorial Stadium • Memphis, TN	CBSSN	**W** 37–29	10,263	
September 1	8:00 p.m.	**Navy**	Florida Atlantic	FAU Stadium • Boca Raton, FL	ESPNU	**W** 42–19	28,481	
September 2	3:30 p.m.	**Temple**	Notre Dame	Notre Dame Stadium • South Bend, IN	NBC	**L** 16–49	77,622	
September 2	4:00 p.m.	Stony Brook	No. 19 **South Florida**	Raymond James Stadium • Tampa, FL	ESPN3	**W** 31–17	26,460	
September 2	6:00 p.m.	No. 1 (FCS) James Madison	**East Carolina**	Dowdy–Ficklen Stadium • Greenville, NC	ESPN3	**L** 14–34	40,169	
September 2^{[a]}	7:00 p.m.	**Houston**	UTSA	Alamodome • San Antonio, TX	STADIUM	**CANCELLED**		
September 2	7:00 p.m.	Stephen F. Austin	**SMU**	Gerald J. Ford Stadium • University Park, TX	ESPN3	**W** 58–14	20,478	
September 2	8:00 p.m.	No. 21 (FCS) Grambling State	**Tulane**	Yulman Stadium • New Orleans, LA	ESPN3	**W** 43–14	15,940	
^{#}Rankings from AP Poll released prior to game. All times are in Eastern Time.

^{^[a]}The game between Houston and UTSA was cancelled due to the aftermath of Hurricane Harvey. It was originally scheduled for September 2 at the Alamodome in San Antonio.

=== Week 2 ===
Date	Time	Visiting team	Home team	Site	TV	Result	Attendance	Ref.
September 8^{[b]}	6:30 p.m.	**Memphis**	**UCF**	Spectrum Stadium • Orlando, FL	ESPNU	**CANCELLED**		
September 9^{[c]}	10:30 a.m.	No. 21 **South Florida**	**Connecticut**	Rentschler Field • East Hartford, CT	ESPNews	**CANCELLED**		
September 9	12:00 p.m.	**Cincinnati**	No. 8 Michigan	Michigan Stadium • Ann Arbor, MI	ABC	**L** 14–36	111,384	
September 9	12:00 p.m.	**East Carolina**	West Virginia	Mountaineer Field • Morgantown, WV	FS2	**L** 20–56	56,797	
September 9	3:30 p.m.	No. 6 (FCS) Villanova	**Temple**	Lincoln Financial Field • Philadelphia, PA	ESPN3	**W** 16–13	35,117	
September 9	3:30 p.m.	**Tulane**	**Navy**	Navy–Marine Corps Memorial Stadium • Annapolis, MD	CBSSN	**NAVY** 23–21	30,420	
September 9	4:00 p.m.	Louisiana–Lafayette	**Tulsa**	H. A. Chapman Stadium • Annapolis, MD	ESPN3	**W** 66–42	17,758	
September 9	7:00 p.m.	North Texas	**SMU**	Gerald J. Ford Stadium • Dallas, TX	ESPN3	**W** 54–32	24,638	
September 9	10:30 p.m.	**Houston**	Arizona	Arizona Stadium • Tucson, AZ	ESPNU	**W** 19–16	43,334	
^{#}Rankings from AP Poll released prior to game. All times are in Eastern Time.

^{^[b]}The game between UCF and Memphis was cancelled due to Hurricane Irma. It was originally scheduled for September 9 at 8:00 p.m. before it was moved to September 8 at 6:30 p.m. The game has been rescheduled for September 30.
^{^[c]}The game between UConn and USF was cancelled due to Hurricane Irma. It was originally scheduled for September 9 at 12:00 p.m. before it was moved to 10:30 a.m. The game has been rescheduled for November 4.

=== Week 3 ===
Date	Time	Visiting team	Home team	Site	TV	Result	Attendance	Ref.
September 15	7:00 p.m.	Illinois	No. 22 **South Florida**	Raymond James Stadium • Tampa, FL	ESPN	**W** 47–23	35,404	
September 15	7:00 p.m.	UMass	**Temple**	Lincoln Financial Field • Philadelphia, PA	ESPNU	**W** 29–21	22,911	
September 16	12:00 p.m.	**Connecticut**	Virginia	Scott Stadium • Charlottesville, VA	ESPN2	**L** 18–38	33,056	
September 16	12:00 p.m.	No. 25 UCLA	**Memphis**	Liberty Bowl Memorial Stadium • Memphis, TN	ABC	**W** 48–45	46,291	
September 16	3:30 p.m.	No. 16 Virginia Tech	**East Carolina**	Dowdy–Ficklen Stadium • Greenville, NC	CBSSN	**L** 17–64	43,776	
September 16	3:30 p.m.	**SMU**	No. 20 TCU	Amon G. Carter Stadium • Fort Worth, TX	ESPNU	**L** 36–56	44,489	
September 16	6:00 p.m.	**Tulane**	No. 2 Oklahoma	Gaylord Family Oklahoma Memorial Stadium • Norman, OK	FSN PPV	**L** 14–56	86,290	
September 16	7:00 p.m.	**Tulsa**	Toledo	Glass Bowl • Toledo, OH	ESPN3	**L** 51–54	24,239	
September 16^{[d]}	7:30 p.m.	Georgia Tech	**UCF**	Spectrum Stadium • Orlando, FL	ESPNews	**CANCELLED**		
September 16	8:00 p.m.	**Cincinnati**	Miami (OH)	Yager Stadium • Oxford, OH	FOX 19/ESPN3	**W** 21–17	21,811	
September 16	8:00 p.m.	Rice	**Houston**	TDECU Stadium • Houston, TX	ESPNU	**W** 38–3	38,900	
^{#}Rankings from AP Poll released prior to game. All times are in Eastern Time.

^{^[d]}The game between UCF and Georgia Tech was cancelled due to the aftermath of Hurricane Irma. It was originally scheduled for September 16 at 7:30 p.m.

=== Week 4 ===
Date	Time	Visiting team	Home team	Site	TV	Result	Attendance	Ref.
September 21	7:30 p.m.	**Temple**	No. 21 **South Florida**	Raymond James Stadium • Tampa, FL	ESPN	**USF** 43–7	24,325	
September 23	12:00 p.m.	Texas Tech	**Houston**	TDECU Stadium • Houston, TX	ABC/ESPN2	**L** 24–27	36,383	
September 23	12:00 p.m.	Army	**Tulane**	Yulman Stadium • New Orleans, LA	CBSSN	**W** 21–17	16,643	
September 23	1:30 p.m.	New Mexico	**Tulsa**	H. A. Chapman Stadium • Tulsa, OK	ESPN3	**L** 13–16	18,026	
September 23	3:00 p.m.	**UCF**	Maryland	Maryland Stadium • College Park, MD	FS1	**W** 38–10	33,280	
September 23	3:30 p.m.	**Cincinnati**	**Navy**	Navy–Marine Corps Memorial Stadium • Annapolis, MD	CBSSN	**NAVY** 42–32	33,134	
September 23	7:00 p.m.	Arkansas State	**SMU**	Gerald J. Ford Stadium • Dallas, TX	ESPN3	**W** 44–21	23,672	
September 23	8:00 p.m.	Southern Illinois	**Memphis**	Liberty Bowl Memorial Stadium • Memphis, TN	ESPN3	**W** 44–31	41,584	
September 24	12:00 p.m.	**East Carolina**	**Connecticut**	Rentschler Field • East Hartford, CT	ESPNU	**ECU** 41–38	14,036	
^{#}Rankings from AP Poll released prior to game. All times are in Eastern Time.

=== Week 5 ===
Date	Time	Visiting team	Home team	Site	TV	Result	Attendance	Ref.
September 30	12:00 p.m.	No. 18 **South Florida**	East Carolina	Dowdy–Ficklen Stadium • Greenville, NC	CBSSN	**USF** 61–31	34,883	
September 30	12:00 p.m.	**Houston**	Temple	Lincoln Financial Field • Philadelphia, PA	ESPNU	**HOU** 20–13	24,024	
September 30	3:30 p.m.	**Navy**	Tulsa	H. A. Chapman Stadium • Tulsa, OK	ESPNU	**NAVY** 31–21	21,354	
September 30	4:00 p.m.	**Connecticut**	SMU	Gerald J. Ford Stadium • Dallas, TX	ESPNews	**SMU** 49–28	17,237	
September 30	7:00 p.m.	**Memphis**	UCF	Spectrum Stadium • Orlando, FL	ESPN2	**UCF** 40–13	34,022	
September 30	7:00 p.m.	Marshall	Cincinnati	Nippert Stadium • Cincinnati, OH	ESPN3	**L** 21–38	35,736	
^{#}Rankings from AP Poll released prior to game. All times are in Eastern Time.

=== Week 6 ===
Date	Time	Visiting team	Home team	Site	TV	Result	Attendance	Ref.
October 6	7:00 p.m.	**Memphis**	Connecticut	Rentschler Field • East Hartford, CT	ESPN	**MEM** 70–31	19,230	
October 7	11:00 a.m.	**Tulsa**	Tulane	Yulman Stadium • New Orleans, LA	ESPN3	**TULN** 62–28	11,971	
October 7	12:00 p.m.	**Temple**	East Carolina	Dowdy–Ficklen Stadium • Greenville, NC	ESPNU	**TEM** 34–10	31,326	
October 7	3:30 p.m.	Air Force	Navy	Navy–Marine Corps Memorial Stadium • Annapolis, MD	CBSSN	**W** 48–45	38,792	
October 7	7:00 p.m.	**SMU**	Houston	TDECU Stadium • Houston, TX (rivalry)	CBSSN	**HOU** 35–22	31,153	
October 7	8:00 p.m.	No. 25 **UCF**	Cincinnati	Nippert Stadium • Cincinnati, OH	ESPNU	**UCF** 51–23	27,253	
^{#}Rankings from AP Poll released prior to game. All times are in Eastern Time.

=== Week 7 ===
Date	Time	Visiting team	Home team	Site	TV	Result	Attendance	Ref.
October 14	12:00 p.m.	**Connecticut**	**Temple**	Lincoln Financial Field • Philadelphia, PA	ESPNews	**CONN** 28–24	29,849	
October 14	3:45 p.m.	No. 25 **Navy**	**Memphis**	Liberty Bowl Memorial Stadium • Memphis, TN	ESPNU	**MEM** 30–27	40,177	
October 14	3:45 p.m.	**Houston**	**Tulsa**	H. A. Chapman Stadium • Tulsa, OK	ESPNews	**TLSA** 45–17	19,198	
October 14	7:00 p.m.	**Tulane**	FIU	Riccardo Silva Stadium • Miami, FL	CUSA.TV	**L** 10–23	16,433	
October 14	7:15 p.m.	**East Carolina**	No. 22 **UCF**	Spectrum Stadium • Orlando, FL	CBSSN	**UCF** 63–21	40,287	
October 14	7:30 p.m.	**Cincinnati**	No. 18 **South Florida**	Raymond James Stadium • Tampa, FL	ESPNU	**USF** 33–3	43,708	
^{#}Rankings from AP Poll released prior to game. All times are in Eastern Time.

=== Week 8 ===
Date	Time	Visiting team	Home team	Site	TV	Result	Attendance	Ref.
October 19	8:00 p.m.	No. 25 **Memphis**	**Houston**	TDECU Stadium • Houston, TX	ESPN	**MEM** 42–38	30,001	
October 21	12:00 p.m.	**Temple**	Army	Michie Stadium • West Point, NY	CBSSN	**L** 28–31	34,876	
October 21	12:00 p.m.	**Tulsa**	**Connecticut**	Rentschler Field • East Hartford, CT	ESPNU	**CONN** 20–14	24,814	
October 21	3:30 p.m.	No. 20 **UCF**	**Navy**	Navy–Marine Corps Memorial Stadium • Annapolis, MD	CBSSN	**UCF** 31–21	35,277	
October 21	4:00 p.m.	**SMU**	**Cincinnati**	Nippert Stadium • Cincinnati, OH	ESPNU	**SMU** 31–28 ^{OT}	30,885	
October 21	7:00 p.m.	No. 16 **South Florida**	**Tulane**	Yulman Stadium • New Orleans, LA	ESPN2	**USF** 34–28	17,256	
October 21	7:00 p.m.	BYU	**East Carolina**	Dowdy–Ficklen Stadium • Greenville, NC	CBSSN	**W** 33–17	38,835	
^{#}Rankings from AP Poll released prior to game. All times are in Eastern Time.

=== Week 9 ===
Date	Time	Visiting team	Home team	Site	TV	Result	Attendance	Ref.
October 27	8:00 p.m.	**Tulane**	No. 24 **Memphis**	Liberty Bowl Memorial Stadium • Memphis, TN	CBSSN	**MEM** 56–26	17,989	
October 27	9:00 p.m.	**Tulsa**	**SMU**	Gerald J. Ford Stadium • Dallas, TX	ESPN2	**SMU** 38–34	14,930	
October 28	3:45 p.m.	**Houston**	No. 17 **South Florida**	Raymond James Stadium • Tampa, FL	ESPNU	**HOU** 28–24	32,316	
October 28	5:00 p.m.	Austin Peay	No. 18 **UCF**	Spectrum Stadium • Orlando, FL	ESPN3	**W** 73–33	27,606	
October 28	6:30 p.m.	Missouri	**Connecticut**	Rentschler Field • East Hartford, CT	CBSSN	**L** 12–52	21,062	
^{#}Rankings from AP Poll released prior to game. All times are in Eastern Time.

=== Week 10 ===
Date	Time	Visiting team	Home team	Site	TV	Result	Attendance	Ref.
November 2	8:00 p.m.	**Navy**	Temple	Lincoln Financial Field • Philadelphia, PA	ESPN	**TEM** 34–26	26,127	
November 3	8:00 p.m.	No. 22 **Memphis**	Tulsa	H. A. Chapman Stadium • Tulsa, OK	ESPN2	**MEM** 41–14	17,383	
November 4	12:00 p.m.	**East Carolina**	Houston	TDECU Stadium • Houston, TX	CBSSN	**HOU** 52–27	29,810	
November 4	3:30 p.m.	**South Florida**	Connecticut	Rentschler Field • East Hartford, CT	ESPNU	**USF** 37–20	18,430	
November 4	4:00 p.m.	**Cincinnati**	Tulane	Yulman Stadium • New Orleans, LA	ESPN3	**CIN** 17–16	20,798	
November 4	7:15 p.m.	No. 15 **UCF**	SMU	Gerald J. Ford Stadium • Dallas, TX	ESPN2	**UCF** 31–24	24,445	
^{#}Rankings from AP Poll released prior to game. All times are in Eastern Time.

=== Week 11 ===
Date	Time	Visiting team	Home team	Site	TV	Result	Attendance	Ref.
November 10	7:00 p.m.	**Temple**	**Cincinnati**	Nippert Stadium • Cincinnati, OH	ESPN2	**TEM** 35–24	22,773	
November 11	12:00 p.m.	**Connecticut**	No. 14 **UCF**	Spectrum Stadium • Orlando, FL	ESPNU	**UCF** 49–24	29,384	
November 11	3:30 p.m.	**SMU**	**Navy**	Navy–Marine Corps Memorial Stadium • Annapolis, MD	CBSSN	**NAVY** 43–40	36,157	
November 11	7:00 p.m.	**Tulane**	**East Carolina**	Dowdy–Ficklen Stadium • Greenville, NC	CBSSN	**TULN** 31–24 ^{OT}	36,178	
^{#}Rankings from AP Poll released prior to game. All times are in Eastern Time.

=== Week 12 ===
Date	Time	Visiting team	Home team	Site	TV	Result	Attendance	Ref.
November 16	8:00 p.m.	**Tulsa**	No. 23 **South Florida**	Raymond James Stadium • Tampa, FL	ESPN	**USF** 27–20	26,195	
November 18	12:00 p.m.	No. 14 **UCF**	**Temple**	Lincoln Financial Field • Philadelphia, PA	ESPNU	**UCF** 45–19	25,877	
November 18	12:00 p.m.	**SMU**	No. 18 **Memphis**	Liberty Bowl Memorial Stadium • Memphis, TN	ESPNews	**MEM** 66–45	35,329	
November 18	12:00 p.m.	**Cincinnati**	**East Carolina**	Dowdy–Ficklen Stadium • Greenville, NC	CBSSN	**ECU** 48–20	31,923	
November 18	3:30 p.m.	**Navy**	No. 9 Notre Dame	Notre Dame Stadium • South Bend, IN	NBC	**L** 17–24	77,622	
November 18	4:00 p.m.	**Houston**	**Tulane**	Yulman Stadium • New Orleans, LA	ESPNews	**TULN** 20–17	19,026	
November 18	7:00 p.m.	Boston College	**Connecticut**	Fenway Park • Boston, MA	CBSSN	**L** 16–39	20,133	
^{#}Rankings from AP Poll released prior to game. All times are in Eastern Time.

=== Week 13 ===
Date	Time	Visiting team	Home team	Site	TV	Result	Attendance	Ref.
November 24	12:00 p.m.	**Navy**	**Houston**	TDECU Stadium • Houston, TX	ESPN	**HOU** 24–14	29,252	
November 24	3:30 p.m.	No. 22 **South Florida**	No. 13 **UCF**	Spectrum Stadium • Orlando, FL	ABC	**UCF** 49–42	47,129	
November 25	12:00 p.m.	**Connecticut**	**Cincinnati**	Nippert Stadium • Cincinnati, OH	ESPNews	**CIN** 22–21	23,125	
November 25	12:00 p.m.	**East Carolina**	No. 17 **Memphis**	Liberty Bowl Memorial Stadium • Memphis, TN	ESPNU	**MEM** 70–13	41,517	
November 25	12:00 p.m.	**Tulane**	**SMU**	Gerald J. Ford Stadium • Dallas, TX	CBSSN	**SMU** 41–38	14,209	
November 25	4:00 p.m.	**Temple**	**Tulsa**	H. A. Chapman Stadium • Tulsa, OK	ESPNews	**TEM** 43–22	17,032	
^{#}Rankings from AP Poll released prior to game. All times are in Eastern Time.

=== Week 14 – AAC Championship game ===
Date	Time	Visiting team	Home team	Site	TV	Result	Attendance	Ref.
December 2	12:00 p.m.	No. 16 **Memphis**	No. 12 **UCF**	Spectrum Stadium • Orlando, FL	ABC	**UCF** 62–55 ^{2OT}	41,433	
^{#}Rankings from AP Poll released prior to game. All times are in Eastern Time.

=== Week 15 ===
Date	Time	Visiting team	Home team	Site	TV	Result	Attendance	Ref.
December 9	3:00 p.m.	**Navy**	Army	Lincoln Financial Field • Philadelphia, PA (118th Army–Navy Game/Commander-in-Chief's Trophy)	CBS	**L** 13–14		
^{#}Rankings from AP Poll released prior to game. All times are in Eastern Time.

== Records against other conferences ==
2017 records against other college football conferences.

=== FBS conferences ===
Power Conferences	Record
ACC	0–3
Big Ten	2–1
Big 12	0–5
Pac-12	2–0
SEC	0–1
Notre Dame	0–2
Other FBS Conferences	Record
C-USA	4–2
MAC	1–1
Mountain West	2–1
Independents (Excluding Notre Dame)	3–2
Sun Belt	3–0
FBS Total	17–18

=== FCS conferences ===
Conference	Record
CAA	2–1
MVFC	1–0
OVC	2–0
Patriot	1–0
Southland	1–0
SWAC	1–0
Total FCS Record	8–1

=== Postseason ===
Power Conferences	Record
ACC	1–0
Big 12	1–1
SEC	1–0
Other FBS Conferences	Record
C–USA	1–1
Mountain West	0–1
Total Bowl Record	4–3

== Postseason ==
=== Bowl games ===
American Athletic Conference bowl games for the 2017 season are:

Bowl game	Date	Site	Television	Time (EST)	AAC team	Opponent	Score	Attendance
Frisco Bowl	December 20, 2017	Toyota Stadium • Frisco, TX	ESPN	8:00 p.m.	SMU	Louisiana Tech	L 10–51	14,419
Gasparilla Bowl	December 21, 2017	Tropicana Field • St. Petersburg, FL	ESPN	8:00 p.m.	Temple	FIU	W 28–3	16,363
Birmingham Bowl	December 23, 2017	Legion Field • Birmingham, AL	ESPN	12:00 p.m.	South Florida	Texas Tech	W 38–34	28,623
Hawaii Bowl	December 24, 2017	Aloha Stadium • Honolulu, HI	ESPN	8:30 p.m.	Houston	Fresno State	L 27–33	20,546
Military Bowl	December 28, 2017	Navy–Marine Corps Memorial Stadium • Annapolis, MD	ESPN	1:30 p.m.	Navy	Virginia	W 49–7	35,921
Liberty Bowl	December 30, 2017	Liberty Bowl Memorial Stadium • Memphis, TN	ABC	12:30 p.m.	#20 Memphis	Iowa State	L 20–21	57,266
Peach Bowl	January 1, 2018	Mercedes-Benz Stadium • Atlanta, GA	ESPN	12:30 p.m.	#12 UCF	#7 Auburn	W 34–27	71,109

Rankings are from CFP Poll. All times Eastern Time Zone.

=== Selection of teams ===
- Bowl eligible: UCF, South Florida, Memphis, Houston, Navy, SMU, Temple
- Bowl-ineligible: Cincinnati, Connecticut, East Carolina, Tulsa, Tulane

== Awards and honors ==
=== Players of the week ===
Week	Offensive			Defensive			Special Teams		
Week	Player	Position	Team	Player	Position	Team	Player	Position	Team
Week 1	McKenzie Milton	QB	UCF	Jordan Wyatt	CB	SMU	Tony Pollard	WR	Memphis
Week 2	Courtland Sutton	WR	SMU	Ed Oliver	DT	Houston	Aaron Boumerhi	K	Temple
Week 3	Riley Ferguson	QB	Memphis	Malik Clements/Quincy Roche	S/DE	Cincinnati/Temple	Dane Roy	P	Houston
Week 4	Thomas Sirk	QB	ECU	Deatrick Nichols	CB	USF	Emilio Nadelman	K	USF
Week 5	Adrian Killins/Zach Abey	RB/QB	UCF/Navy	Justin Lawler	DE	SMU	Matthew Wright	K	UCF
Week 6	Riley Ferguson	QB	Memphis	Terrell Williams	DB	Houston	Bennett Moehring	K	Navy
Week 7	McKenzie Milton	QB	UCF	Austin Hall	DB/LB	Memphis	Mike Hughes/Emilio Nadelman	CB/K	UCF/USF
Week 8	Trey Quinn	WR	SMU	TJ Carter	DB	Memphis	Jake Verity	K	ECU
Week 9	D'Eriq King	QB	Houston	Genard Avery	LB	Memphis	Mike Hughes	CB	UCF
Week 10	Quinton Flowers	QB	USF	Sharif Finch	DE	Temple	Emilio Nadelman	K	USF
Week 11	Malcolm Perry	QB	Navy	Raejuan Marbley	LB	Tulane	Isaiah Wright	KOR	Temple

=== Conference awards ===
The following individuals received postseason honors as voted by the American Athletic Conference football coaches at the end of the season

2017 American Athletic Conference Individual Awards
Award	Recipient(s)
Offensive Player of the Year	McKenzie Milton
Defensive Player of the Year	Ed Oliver
Special Teams Player of the Year	Tony Pollard
Rookie of the Year	T. J. Carter
Coach of the Year	Scott Frost

2017 All-American Athletic Conference Football Teams
First Team		Second Team	
Offense	Defense	Offense	Defense
WR – Anthony Miller, Memphis; WR – Trey Quinn, SMU; WR – Courtland Sutton, SMU; OT – Aaron Evans, UCF; OT – Trevon Tate, Memphis; OG – Gabe Kuhn, Memphis; OG – Jeremi Hall, USF; C – Jordan Johnson, UCF; TE – Jordan Akins, UCF; QB – McKenzie Milton, UCF; QB – Riley Ferguson, Memphis; RB – Adrian Killins, UCF; RB – D'Angelo Brewer, Tulsa; K – Emilio Nadelman, USF; RS – Tony Pollard, Memphis	DL – Jamiyus Pittman, UCF; DL – Ed Oliver, Houston; DL – Deadrin Senat, USF; DL Justin Lawler, SMU; LB – Shaquem Griffin, UCF; LB – D'Juan Hines, Houston; LB – Genard Avery, Memphis; LB – Auggie Sanchez, USF; CB - Mike Hughes, UCF; CB – Parry Nickerson, Tulane; S – Kyle Gibson, UCF; S – Delvon Randall, Temple; P – James Smith, Cincinnati	WR – Tre'Quan Smith, UCF; WR – Trevon Brown, ECU; WR – Justin Hobbs, Tulsa; OT – Korey Cunningham, Cincinnati; OT – Wyatt Miller, UCF; OT – Marcus Norman, USF; OG – Brian Carter, Temple; OG – Tyler Bowling, Tulsa; C – Chandler Miller, Tulsa; TE – Joey Magnifico, Memphis; QB – Quinton Flowers, USF; RB – Dontrell Hilliard, Tulane; RB – Darrell Henderson, Memphis; K – Matthew Wright, UCF; RS – Mike Hughes, UCF	DL – Trysten Hill, UCF; DL – Bruce Hector, USF; DL – Sharif Finch, Temple; DL – Jacob Martin, Temple; DL – Jeremy Smith, Tulsa; LB – Chequan Burkett, UCF; LB – Jaylyin Minor, Cincinnati; LB – D.J. Palmore, Navy; LB – Rae Juan Marbley, Tulane; CB – T.J. Carter, Memphis; CB – Deatrick Nichols, USF; S – Khalil Williams, Houston; S – Devin Abraham, USF; P – Mac Loudermilk, UCF
Additional players added to the all-conference teams due to ties in the voting.

== NFL draft ==
The following list includes all AAC players who were drafted in the 2018 NFL draft.

Player	Position	School	Draft Round	Round Pick	Overall Pick	Team
Mike Hughes	CB	UCF	1	30	30	Minnesota Vikings
Courtland Sutton	WR	SMU	2	8	40	Denver Broncos
Anthony Miller	WR	Memphis	2	19	51	Chicago Bears
Deadrin Senat	DT	South Florida	3	26	90	Atlanta Falcons
Tre'Quan Smith	WR	UCF	3	27	91	New Orleans Saints
Jordan Akins	TE	UCF	3	34	98	Houston Texans
Shaquem Griffin	LB	UCF	5	4	141	Seattle Seahawks
Genard Avery	LB	Memphis	5	13	150	Cleveland Browns
Marquez Valdes-Scantling	WR	South Florida	5	37	174	Green Bay Packers
Parry Nickerson	CB	Tulane	6	5	179	New York Jets
Folorunso Fatukasi	DT	Connecticut	6	6	180	New York Jets
Jacob Martin	LB	Temple	6	12	186	Seattle Seahawks
Ade Aruna	DE	Tulane	6	44	218	Minnesota Vikings
Matthew Adams	LB	Houston	7	3	221	Indianapolis Colts
Jullian Taylor	DT	Temple	7	5	223	San Francisco 49ers
Justin Lawler	DE	SMU	7	26	244	Los Angeles Rams
Korey Cunningham	OT	Cincinnati	7	36	254	Arizona Cardinals
Trey Quinn	WR	SMU	7	38	256	Washington Redskins
