= Dave Patenaude =

American football coach (born 1968)

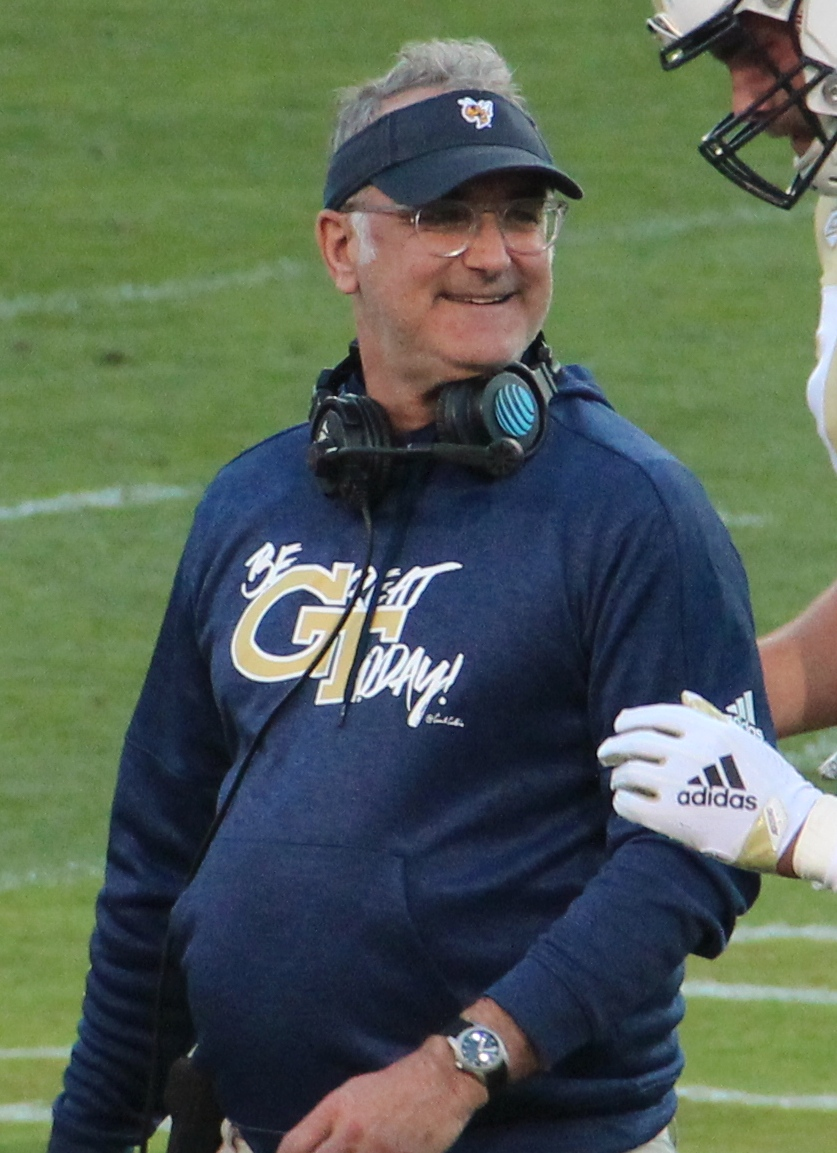
- Patenaude in 2019

Biographical details
- Born: May 9, 1968 (age 58)
- Education: Central Connecticut

Coaching career (HC unless noted)
- 1991: Coast Guard (RB)
- 1992–1993: Springfield (MA) (WR)
- 1994: Fordham (TE)
- 1995: Fordham (WR)
- 1996–1997: Fordham (QB)
- 1998–2000: Columbia (WR)
- 2001: Columbia (OC/QB)
- 2002–2003: New Haven
- 2004–2005: Holy Cross (RB)
- 2007: Hofstra (QB)
- 2008–2009: Hofstra (OC/QB)
- 2010–2011: Georgetown (OC/QB)
- 2012–2016: Coastal Carolina (OC/QB)
- 2017–2018: Temple (OC/QB)
- 2019–2021: Georgia Tech (OC/QB)
- 2022 (Note: Patenaude was hired in January 2022 and resigned in August before the start of Old Dominion's season.): Old Dominion (OC/QB)
- 2023: Virginia (Analyst)
- 2024–2025: Buffalo (OC/QB)

Head coaching record
- Overall: 5–15

David S. Patenaude (born May 9, 1968) is an American football coach. Patenaude spent the 2023 season as an Analyst at the University of Virginia. He was previously the offensive coordinator at the Georgia Institute of Technology. Prior to coming to Georgia Tech, Patenaude was the offensive coordinator at Columbia University, Georgetown University, Coastal Carolina University, and Temple University, where he produced multiple All-Americans. Patenaude also served as the head football coach at University of New Haven for two seasons, from 2002 to 2003, before the program was temporarily discontinued.

After Georgia Tech completed their 2021 season with a record of 3-9 and scoring 0 points over the course of the last two games, Patenaude was dismissed as offensive coordinator.

== Coaching career ==
Patenaude spent time at the Coast Guard Academy, Springfield, Fordham, and Columbia before being named head coach at New Haven. Following Patenaude's two years at the helm of New Haven's football program, the university decided to drop the sport. Patenaude would then go to coach at Holy Cross, Hofstra and Georgetown before being named the offensive coordinator at Coastal Carolina in 2012.

In 2012, Patenaude became the offensive coordinator underneath Joe Moglia at Coastal Carolina. During Patenaude's first season, Coastal Carolina averaged 437.8 yards of offense a game. The season, in 2013, Coastal Carolina broke 25 single-season program records and finished in the Top 5 in five different FCS offensive categories. During that season, Patenaude mentored Lorenzo Taliaferro, who finished the season third in the FCS in rushing yards and touchdowns.

During the 2014 season, Patenaude's offense had two All-Americans in Alex Ross and Chad Hamilton. Ross would go on to win the Big South Conference's Player of the Year for the 2014 and 2015 seasons. In 2016, Coastal Carolina averaged 37.3 points per game despite using six different starting quarterbacks due to injuries. The 2016 season saw Patenaude mentor two more All-Americans in running back De'Angelo Henderson and offensive lineman Voghens Larrieux.

After five seasons at Coastal Carolina, Patenaude left to join Geoff Collins' staff at Temple. Patenaude previously worked with Collins at Fordham.

In Patenaude's first season as offensive coordinator, Temple went 7–6 and won the 2017 Gasparilla Bowl. Temple's offense averaged 25.1 points and 388.2 yards of offense per game.

Patenaude followed Collins again and was hired as offensive coordinator of Georgia Tech on December 31, 2018. His contract was not renewed after the 2021 season.

In January 2022, Patenaude was hired by Ricky Rahne as the new offensive coordinator and quarterbacks coach at Old Dominion. Patenaude resigned on August 12, three weeks before the start of the regular season.

Patenaude spent the 2023 season as the Senior Offensive Analyst at the University of Virginia.

On December 29, 2023, Patenaude was hired as the offensive coordinator at Buffalo. Patenaude and Buffalo parted ways on December 11, 2025. Buffalo's offense declined in his second season, where the Bulls threw a league-high 14 interceptions, while finishing 10th in rushing in the MAC.

== Head coaching record ==
Year	Team	Overall	Conference	Standing	Bowl/playoffs
New Haven Chargers (NCAA Division II Independent) (2002–2003)
2002	New Haven	4–6			
2003	New Haven	1–9			
New Haven:		5–15			
Total:		5–15			
