= T. J. Carter (defensive back) =

American football player (born 1999)

Profile
- Position: Strong safety

Personal information
- Born: April 3, 1999 (age 27); Nashville, Tennessee, U.S.
- Listed height: 5 ft 11 in (1.80 m)
- Listed weight: 193 lb (88 kg)

Career information
- High school: Hendersonville (TN); Stratford (TN)
- College: Memphis (2017–2020); TCU (2021)
- NFL draft: 2022: undrafted

Career history
- Los Angeles Rams (2022); Birmingham Stallions (2023–2024)

Awards and highlights
- UFL champion (2024); USFL champion (2023); AAC Rookie of the Year (2017); 2× Second-team All-AAC (2017, 2018)

Career NFL statistics
- Games played: 1
- Tackles: 1
- Stats at Pro Football Reference

T. J. Carter (born April 3, 1999) is an American football strong safety. He played college football at Memphis and TCU and was signed by the Los Angeles Rams as an undrafted free agent in 2022.

== Early life ==
Carter was born on April 3, 1999, in Nashville, Tennessee. He attended Hendersonville High School, where he played football as a sophomore and junior. Playing running back, defensive back, and return specialist, Carter led the team with 1,084 rushing yards as a junior and was named all-mid-state by The Tennessean, 6-5A Specialty Player of the Year, and all-region. He was dismissed from the team prior to his senior year due to violating team rules, and subsequently transferred to Stratford High School. Carter helped Stratford compile an undefeated regular season record, while gaining over 2,100 all-purpose yards and scoring 22 touchdowns. He was rated by Scout.com the best defensive back in all of Tennessee, and according to 247Sports and Rivals.com was among the top-50 players at the position nationally.

After graduating from Stratford, Carter announced his commitment to play college football at Memphis. He became a starter as a true freshman in 2017 and appeared in all 13 games, posting a school freshman record five interceptions. He also placed fifth on the roster with 69 tackles. As a sophomore, Carter was third on the team with 68 tackles, recorded two interceptions, and tallied a team-leading 12 pass breakups while appearing in all 14 matches.

In 2019, as a junior, Carter appeared in 12 of the team's 14 games and posted 39 tackles, a forced fumble and recovery, and seven passes broken up. The following season, he made 11 tackles in seven appearances. After receiving one extra year of eligibility due to the COVID-19 pandemic, Carter transferred to TCU in 2021. As a fifth-year senior, he started ten games, missing the final two due to injury, and placed second on the team with 63 tackles.

== Professional career ==
Pre-draft measurables
Height	Weight	Arm length	Hand span	Wingspan	40-yard dash	10-yard split	20-yard split	20-yard shuttle	Three-cone drill	Vertical jump	Broad jump
5 ft 9 1/4 in (1.76 m)	189 lb (86 kg)	30 3/4 in (0.78 m)	8 3/8 in (0.21 m)	6 ft 1 1/2 in (1.87 m)	4.57 s	1.52 s	2.71 s	4.15 s	7.21 s	37.0 in (0.94 m)	9 ft 5 in (2.87 m)
All values from Pro Day

=== Los Angeles Rams ===
After going unselected in the 2022 NFL draft, Carter was signed as an undrafted free agent by the Los Angeles Rams. He was waived on May 17, but then brought back the following day. At the final roster cuts on August 30, he was waived, but afterwards was re-signed to the practice squad. Carter was elevated to the active roster for their Week 16 match versus the Denver Broncos, and made his NFL debut in the 51–14 win, recording one tackle. He signed a reserve/futures contract on January 9, 2023. On March 10, Carter was waived.

=== Birmingham Stallions ===
Carter signed with the Birmingham Stallions of the United States Football League on March 20, 2023. He was released on March 10, 2024. He was re-signed on May 7, 2024, and again on August 19, 2024. He was released on February 7, 2025.
