= Sharif Finch =

American football player (born 1995)

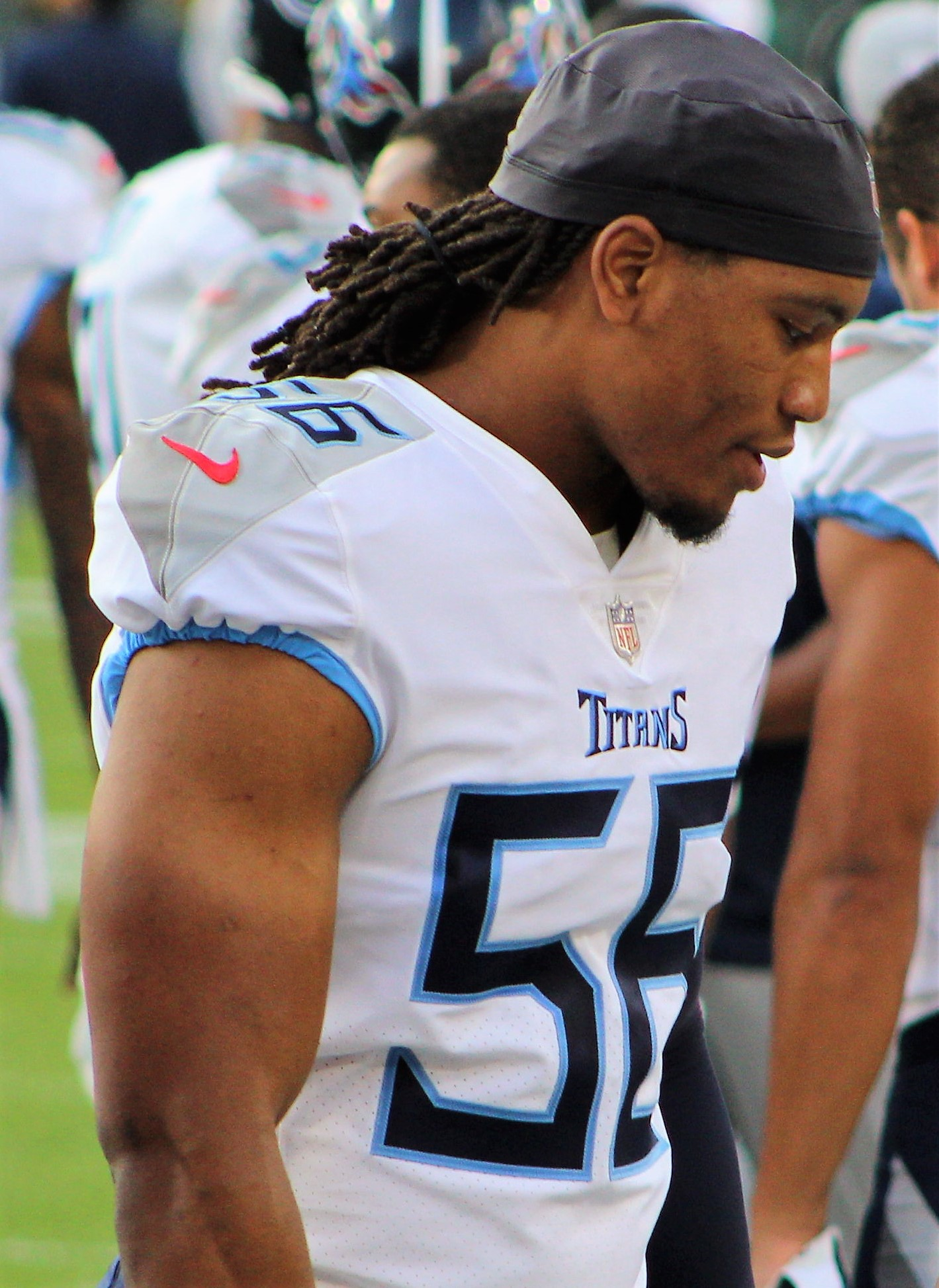
- Finch with the Tennessee Titans in 2018

No. 56, 54, 59
- Position: Defensive lineman

Personal information
- Born: October 1, 1995 (age 31); Queens, New York, U.S.
- Listed height: 6 ft 4 in (1.93 m)
- Listed weight: 250 lb (113 kg)

Career information
- High school: Henrico (Henrico, Virginia)
- College: Temple (2013–2017)
- NFL draft: 2018: undrafted

Career history
- Tennessee Titans (2018–2019); Cincinnati Bengals (2019); Las Vegas Raiders (2020)*; Chicago Bears (2020)*; New York Jets (2020); Tennessee Titans (2021); New Orleans Saints (2021)*; Seattle Sea Dragons (2023); Calgary Stampeders (2024)*
- * Offseason or practice squad member only

Awards and highlights
- Second-team All-AAC (2017)

Career NFL statistics
- Total tackles: 41
- Sacks: 3.5
- Forced fumbles: 2
- Fumble recoveries: 1
- Stats at Pro Football Reference

Sharif Jarel Gregory Wayne Finch (born October 1, 1995) is an American former professional football player who was a defensive lineman in the National Football League (NFL). He played college football for the Temple Owls, where he played 53 career games, which is tied for the most career games in Temple football history. He signed with the Tennessee Titans of the National Football League (NFL) as an undrafted free agent following the 2018 NFL draft. He was also a member of the Cincinnati Bengals, Las Vegas Raiders, Chicago Bears, New York Jets, New Orleans Saints, Seattle Sea Dragons, and Calgary Stampeders.

== Early life ==
Finch was born to Wendy and Gregory Finch on October 1, 1995, in the Queens borough of New York City. He played linebacker at Henrico High School. During his junior season in 2011, Finch led the team with 161 tackles and 10.5 sacks. During his senior season in 2012, Finch once again led the team with 123 tackles and 7 sacks. Finch received eight scholarship offers to play college football. His top three candidate were Temple, Penn State, and Old Dominion. Impressed with Temple's facilities and academics, Finch officially committed to play for coach Matt Rhule and the Owls in February 2013.

== College career ==
In 2013, Finch played 11 games and started twice as a true freshman for the Temple Owls. In the season finale, he batted down a pass on 3rd down forcing Memphis to punt and then blocked the punt on the following play which Temple recovered in the endzone for a Touchdown.

In the 2014 season, Finch moved to defensive end and played in all 13 games and started in 11 games. In the first defensive play of the first home game against Navy, he forced a fumble that he recovered in the endzone for a touchdown. In the next game against Delaware State, Finch recorded his first career interception, where he returned it 65 yards for a touchdown.

In 2015, Finch's production declined as the team went with a defensive end rotation strategy. He played in 12 games, and missed one game to nurse a knee injury. In the season opening game at Penn State, he recorded a 26-yard interception return to set up Temple's game-winning score. Finch finished tied for second in the nation in blocked kicks.

In 2016, knee injuries limited Finch to just four games. He was granted a medical redshirt exception, allowing him to play in the 2017 season.

In the 2017 season, Finch played in all 13 games with 12 starts. He recorded 55 tackles, 15.5 tackles for loss, 8.5 sacks, one forced fumble and one fumble recovery. His team-leading 8.5 sacks were a single-season career high. He was named to the Second Team All-American Athletic Conference and ECAC First Team All-East. On March 19, 2018, Finch participated in the Temple ProDay, an event where Temple football players demonstrate their skills to an audience of NFL scouts and coaches. Twenty-two NFL teams attended this event.

== Professional career ==
Pre-draft measurables
Height	Weight	40-yard dash	10-yard split	20-yard split	20-yard shuttle	Three-cone drill	Vertical jump	Broad jump	Bench press
6 ft 4 1/8 in (1.93 m)	251 lb (114 kg)	4.65 s	1.65 s	2.66 s	4.45 s	7.00 s	31 in (0.79 m)	9 ft 9 in (2.97 m)	23 reps
All values from NFL draft

Finch was not selected in the 2018 NFL draft. Despite a body size prototypical for NFL outside linebackers, scouting reports indicated Finch lacked strength and technique needed at the professional level. However, the reports state it lacked enough research on Finch due to his 2016 injury. Scouting reports also considered Finch to be a good teammate and a humble leader.

=== Tennessee Titans (first stint) ===
Finch signed with the Tennessee Titans as an undrafted free agent on May 11, 2018. The free agent offer by the Titans to Finch was the highest among the 22 undrafted free agents signed that season. On September 1, 2018, Finch secured his place on the Titans' 53-man roster for the 2018 season, after a strong preseason. He recorded his first career tackle on September 23, 2018, in a 9–6 Titans victory on the road against the Jacksonville Jaguars. On September 30, 2018, Finch recorded his first career sack in a 26–23 overtime victory against the Philadelphia Eagles.

Finch finished his rookie year with 22 tackles, 1.5 sacks, two quarterback pressures, two stops for loss, two forced fumbles, a fumble recovery, and seven special teams stops.

Finch was waived by the Titans on December 21, 2019, after being inactive for the majority of the season.

=== Cincinnati Bengals ===
On December 23, 2019, Finch was claimed off waivers by the Cincinnati Bengals, but was waived the next day after failing his physical.

=== Las Vegas Raiders ===
Finch was signed by the Las Vegas Raiders on August 25, 2020. The Raiders waived him on September 1, 2020.

=== Chicago Bears ===
On September 29, 2020, Finch was signed to the Chicago Bears' practice squad. He was released on October 23, 2020.

=== New York Jets ===
On November 3, 2020, Finch was signed to the New York Jets' practice squad. He was elevated to the active roster on December 19 and December 26 for the team's weeks 15 and 16 games against the Los Angeles Rams and Cleveland Browns, and reverted to the practice squad after each game. He was promoted to the active roster on January 2, 2021. He was waived on June 1, 2021.

=== Tennessee Titans (second stint) ===
On September 28, 2021, Finch was signed to the Tennessee Titans practice squad. He was signed to the active roster on October 1, 2021. He was waived on October 9.

=== New Orleans Saints ===
On November 29, 2021, Finch was signed to the New Orleans Saints practice squad. He signed a reserve/future contract with the Saints on January 11, 2022. He was placed on injured reserve on May 18, 2022. He was released on June 2, 2022.

=== Seattle Sea Dragons ===
Finch played for the Seattle Sea Dragons of the XFL in 2023. The Sea Dragons folded when the XFL and USFL merged to create the United Football League (UFL).

=== Calgary Stampeders ===
On January 25, 2024, Finch signed with the Calgary Stampeders of the Canadian Football League (CFL). He was released on May 15, 2024.

== Career statistics ==
=== NFL ===
Year	Team	Games		Tackling				Fumbles			Interceptions					
Year	Team	GP	GS	Comb	Solo	Ast	Sack	FF	FR	Yds	Int	Yds	Avg	Lng	TD	PD
2018	TEN	15	0	27	20	7	1.5	2	1	0	0	0	0	0	0	0
2019	TEN	8	3	13	10	3	2.0	0	0	0	0	0	0	0	0	0
2020	NYJ	3	0	1	0	1	0.0	0	0	0	0	0	0	0	0	0
2021	TEN	1	0	0	0	0	0.0	0	0	0	0	0	0	0	0	0
2021	NO	1	0	5	5	0	0.0	0	0	0	0	0	0	0	0	0
Career		28	3	46	35	11	3.5	2	1	0	0	0	0	0	0	0

=== College ===
Year	Team	GP	Tackles				Interceptions					FF
Year	Team	GP	Comb	Total	Ast	Sack	Int	Yards	Avg	TD	PD	FF
2013	Temple	11	30	21	9	2.0	0	0	0.0	0	1	0
2014	Temple	12	35	20	15	2.0	1	65	65.0	1	2	2
2015	Temple	13	13	7	6	1.0	1	26	26.0	0	1	0
2016	Temple	4	11	4	7	1.0	0	0	0.0	0	0	2
2017	Temple	13	55	33	22	8.5	0	0	0.0	0	1	1
Career		53	144	85	59	14.5	2	91	45.5	1	5	5

== Personal life ==
Finch is the youngest of 22 siblings and enjoys playing the piano. His mother, Wendy, died of breast cancer on May 28, 2015. His father, Gregory, died of a heart attack on July 30, 2018, while Finch was participating in his rookie training camp. His father's death occurred just 10 days before Finch's first professional preseason game. Since Gregory's death was sudden and heartbreaking, Finch mustered up the courage to comfort his family by playing the piano at his father's funeral. On August 9, 2018, during the third quarter of this preseason game against the Green Bay Packers, Finch recorded his first sack. Immediately after the sack, he pointed to the sky with two fingers as a tribute to both of his parents. He wears a set of dog tags with their names and photo and an inscription that reads "everything is for you".
