= Deatrick Nichols =

American football player (born 1994)

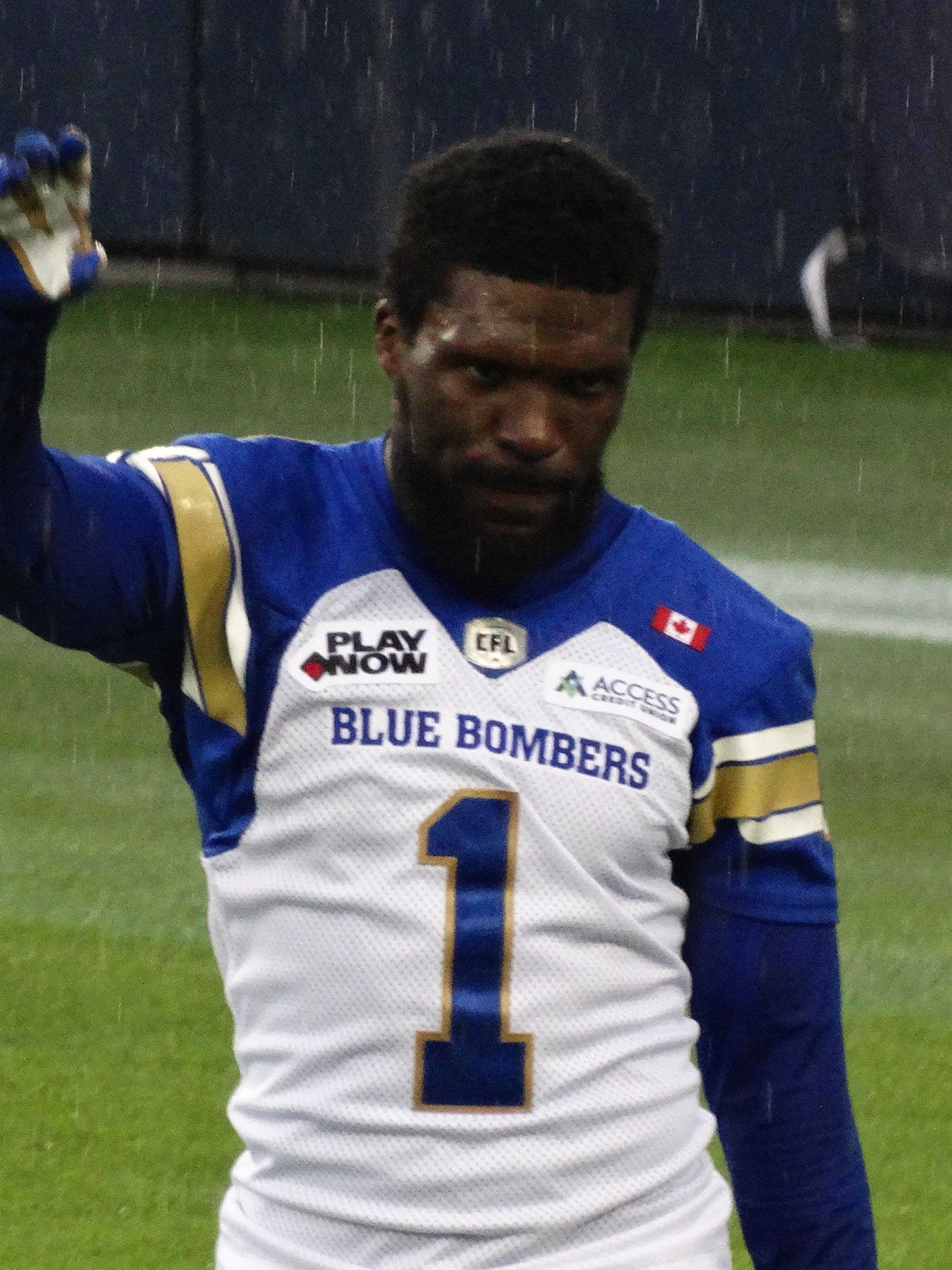
- Nichols with the Winnipeg Blue Bombers in 2025

No. 1 – Winnipeg Blue Bombers
- Position: Defensive back
- Roster status: Active
- CFL status: American

Personal information
- Born: June 8, 1994 (age 32); Miami, Florida, U.S.
- Listed height: 5 ft 9 in (1.75 m)
- Listed weight: 172 lb (78 kg)

Career information
- High school: Miami Central (West Little River, Florida)
- College: South Florida
- NFL draft: 2018: undrafted

Career history
- Arizona Cardinals (2018); Houston Roughnecks (2020); New Orleans Saints (2020)*; Miami Dolphins (2020)*; Winnipeg Blue Bombers (2021–present)
- * Offseason or practice squad member only

Awards and highlights
- Grey Cup champion (2021); 2× CFL All-Star (2021, 2022); 3× CFL West All-Star (2021, 2022, 2024); XFL interceptions leader (2020); 2× First-team All-AAC (2015, 2017); Second-team All-AAC (2016)

Career NFL statistics
- Total tackles: 1
- Interceptions: 0
- Stats at Pro Football Reference

Career CFL statistics as of 2025
- Games played: 82
- Def tackles: 211
- Sacks: 1
- Interceptions: 7
- Stats at CFL.ca

Deatrick Nichols (born June 8, 1994) is an American professional football defensive back for the Winnipeg Blue Bombers of the Canadian Football League (CFL). Nichols won the Grey Cup with the Blue Bombers in his first season in 2021. He played college football at South Florida. He has also been a member of the Arizona Cardinals, Houston Roughnecks, New Orleans Saints, and Miami Dolphins.

== Early life ==
Nichols was born and grew up in Miami, Florida and was a childhood friend of future South Florida teammate and current Cincinnati Bengals running back Quinton Flowers. He attended Miami Central High School in West Little River, Florida where he played football and ran track. In football, Nichols recorded 105 tackles, 12 interceptions and two forced fumbles in four years as the Rockets won state championships in his freshman, junior, and senior seasons. Regarded as a three-star recruit by most recruiting services, Nichols committed to play college football at the University of South Florida, where his former high school coach Telly Lockette was on the coaching staff, over offers from several higher profile programs, including LSU, Tennessee, Miami, and Clemson.

== College career ==
Nichols played four seasons for the South Florida Bulls and started at defensive back his final three years. As a freshman, Nichols came off the bench as a reserve defensive back in seven games and started one game. He became a starter going into his sophomore season and was named first-team All-American Athletic Conference (AAC) after recording 62 tackles, 8.5 for loss, two forced fumbles and a fumble recovery along with a team leading four interceptions, one of which he returned for USF's only defensive touchdown of the season, and five passes broken up. As a junior, he led the Bulls with four interceptions and seven pass breakups and made 49 tackles (2.0 for loss) and was named second-team All-AAC. As a senior, Nichols recorded 56 tackles, 12 pass breakups and 3 interceptions and was again named first-team All-AAC. Nichols finished his collegiate career with 175 tackles, 11 interceptions (third most in school history), 24 passes defensed, three forced fumbles, one fumble recovery, one sack and 14.5 tackles for loss in 50 games played.

== Professional career ==
Pre-draft measurables
Height	Weight	Arm length	Hand span	Wingspan	40-yard dash	10-yard split	20-yard split	20-yard shuttle	Three-cone drill	Vertical jump	Broad jump	Bench press
5 ft 9 in (1.75 m)	185 lb (84 kg)	29 in (0.74 m)	8 5/8 in (0.22 m)	5 ft 10 3/4 in (1.80 m)	4.44 s	1.51 s	2.52 s	4.18 s	6.72 s	37.0 in (0.94 m)	10 ft 7 in (3.23 m)	15 reps
All values from Pro Day

=== Arizona Cardinals ===
Nichols signed with the Arizona Cardinals as an undrafted free agent on April 28, 2018. Nichols made his NFL debut on September 16, 2018, against the Los Angeles Rams, playing on special teams. He was waived on October 8, 2018, and was re-signed to the practice squad. He was promoted to the active roster on October 18, 2018, but was waived two days later and re-signed back to the practice squad on October 23. He was promoted to the active roster on December 18, 2018. He was waived by the Cardinals on December 28, 2018. In total, Nichols appeared in two games, exclusively on special teams, with one tackle during his rookie season. He signed a reserve/future contract with the Cardinals on December 31, 2018.

Nichols was waived by the Cardinals as part of final roster cuts on August 31, 2019.

=== Houston Roughnecks ===
Nichols was selected by the Houston Roughnecks in the 39th Round (round nine of phase four) of the 2020 XFL draft. Nichols recorded 24 tackles (three for loss), with a sack, six passes defended and a league leading three interceptions before the 2020 XFL season was cancelled following growing concerns about the COVID-19 virus. He was placed on the reserve/other league list on March 23, after signing with the Saints. He had his contract terminated when the league suspended operations on April 10, 2020.

=== New Orleans Saints ===
Nichols was signed by the New Orleans Saints on March 24, 2020. He was waived on August 2, 2020.

=== Miami Dolphins ===
On August 13, 2020, Nichols was signed by the Miami Dolphins. He was waived on September 1, 2020.

=== Winnipeg Blue Bombers ===
Nichols signed with the Winnipeg Blue Bombers of the CFL on February 5, 2021. He had a stellar first season with the defending Grey Cup champion Bombers, as a newcomer on the team, he helped a secondary and defence that led the league with lowest yards and points allowed. Nichols had 46 tackles, one sack, and three interceptions that led to him being named a CFL All-Star in his rookie season. Nichols great play continued into the post-season as the Bombers defended their title at the 108th Grey Cup in Hamilton against the hometown Tiger-Cats. As Winnipeg trailed 22-10 in the fourth quarter, the team rallied and the defence stood tall as they would go on to repeat as champions in overtime winning 33-25. Nichols had a critical pass knockdown on the last play in regulation as well as tipping a pass in overtime that led to an interception which sealed the victory.
