= Korey Cunningham =

American football player (1995–2024)

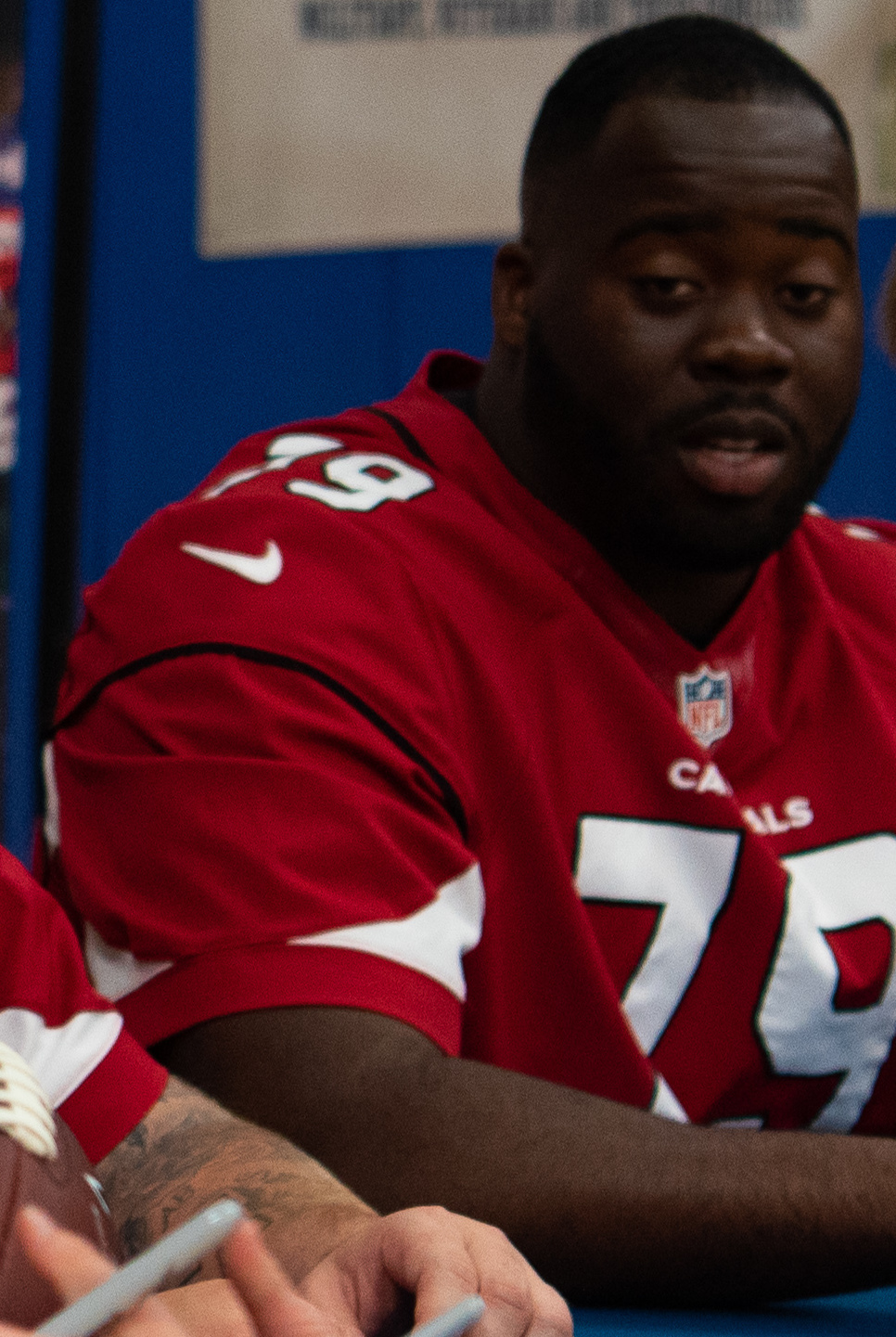
- Cunningham at Luke Air Force Base in 2018

No. 79, 74, 70
- Position: Offensive tackle

Personal information
- Born: May 17, 1995; Montevallo, Alabama, U.S.
- Died: April 25, 2024 (aged 28); Clifton, New Jersey, U.S.
- Listed height: 6 ft 6 in (1.98 m)
- Listed weight: 311 lb (141 kg)

Career information
- High school: Montevallo
- College: Cincinnati (2013–2017)
- NFL draft: 2018: 7th round, 254th overall pick

Career history
- Arizona Cardinals (2018); New England Patriots (2019–2020); New York Giants (2021–2022)

Awards and highlights
- Second-team All-AAC (2017)

Career NFL statistics
- Games played: 31
- Games started: 6
- Stats at Pro Football Reference

Korey Cunningham (May 17, 1995 – April 25, 2024) was an American professional football player who was an offensive tackle in the National Football League (NFL) from 2018 to 2022. He played college football for the Cincinnati Bearcats and was selected by the Arizona Cardinals in the seventh round of the 2018 NFL draft. He played in the NFL for the Cardinals, New England Patriots, and New York Giants.

== Early life and college ==
Cunningham attended Montevallo High School in Montevallo, Alabama. He played for the school's football team as a tight end and defensive end.

Cunningham intended to enroll at Auburn University to play college football for the Tigers under head coach Gene Chizik, but when they replaced Chizik with Gus Malzahn, he changed his commitment to the University of Alabama at Birmingham (UAB) to play for the UAB Blazers. When Blazers' assistant coach Tyson Helton left UAB to coach for the Cincinnati Bearcats at the University of Cincinnati, Cunningham went with him. He converted to offensive tackle with Cincinnati. He played in 33 games, starting his final 24 games as a left tackle, for the Bearcats.

== Professional career ==
Pre-draft measurables
Height	Weight	Arm length	Hand span	40-yard dash	10-yard split	20-yard split	Vertical jump	Broad jump	Bench press
6 ft 5 3/8 in (1.97 m)	311 lb (141 kg)	32 1/4 in (0.82 m)	9 3/8 in (0.24 m)	4.90 s	1.75 s	2.74 s	35.5 in (0.90 m)	9 ft 11 in (3.02 m)	27 reps
All values from Pro Day

=== Arizona Cardinals ===
Cunningham was selected by the Arizona Cardinals in the seventh round (254th overall) of the 2018 NFL draft. On May 11, 2018, he signed his rookie contract. He started six games for the Cardinals during the regular season. He suffered a foot injury in Week 16 and was placed on injured reserve on December 25.

=== New England Patriots ===
On August 28, 2019, the Cardinals traded Cunningham to the New England Patriots for a sixth-round pick in the 2020 NFL draft. Cunningham played in 18 regular season games for the Patriots, starting six of them, and in one game in the postseason.

On August 31, 2021, Cunningham was released by the Patriots.

=== New York Giants ===
On September 7, 2021, Cunningham was signed to the practice squad of the New York Giants. On October 19, Cunningham was signed to the active roster.

On March 17, 2022, the Giants re-signed Cunningham. On July 22, his contract was terminated with a non-football injury designation. On October 18, the Giants re–signed Cunningham to their practice squad. On November 23, he was elevated from the practice squad for Week 12 game against the Dallas Cowboys.

Cunningham signed a reserve/future contract with the team on January 22, 2023. He was released by the organization on August 27.

== Death ==
On April 25, 2024, emergency responders found Cunningham dead at age 28 in his Clifton, New Jersey home shortly before 3:30 p.m. EDT after he was reported unconscious. A local news organization, "RLS Media was informed by law enforcement sources that Cunningham's death was self-inflicted." However, no official cause of death was publicly announced.
