= Taver Johnson =

American football coach (born 1972)

Ohio State Buckeyes
- Title: Assistant defensive backs coach

Personal information
- Born: July 8, 1972 (age 54); Cincinnati, Ohio, U.S.

Career information
- College: Wittenberg

Career history
- Wittenberg (1994–1995) Defensive line coach; Millikin (1996–1997) Linebackers coach; Millikin (1998) Defensive coordinator; Notre Dame (1999) Graduate assistant; Miami (OH) (2000–2003) Linebackers coach; Cleveland Browns (2004) Assistant special teams coach; Miami (OH) (2005–2006) Defensive coordinator; Ohio State (2007–2011) Defensive backs coach; Arkansas (2012–2013) Assistant head coach & defensive backs coach; Purdue (2014–2016) Defensive backs coach; Temple (2017) Defensive coordinator; Ohio State (2018) Cornerbacks coach; Oakland / Las Vegas Raiders (2019–2020) Assistant defensive backs coach; Las Vegas Raiders (2021) Offensive assistant; Eastern Michigan (2022) Defensive pass game coordinator & Safeties coach; Philadelphia Eagles (2023) Assistant defensive backs coach; Tennessee (2024) Defensive analyst; Ohio State (2025–present) Assistant defensive backs coach

Taver Johnson (born July 8, 1972) is an American football coach who is an assistant defensive backs coach for the Ohio State Buckeyes. He previously served as an assistant coach for the Philadelphia Eagles, Cleveland Browns, and Las Vegas Raiders of the NFL and spent 23 years coaching in the college football ranks. Johnson attended and played college football at Wittenberg University (1990–1993), where he was a back-to-back All-American and the All-North Coast Atlantic Conference Defensive Player of the Year in 1992 and 1993.

== Coaching career ==
=== Early coaching stops ===
After graduating from Wittenberg, Johnson joined his alma mater's staff and served as the defensive line coach for the 1994 and 1995 seasons. After leaving Wittenberg, Johnson joined the staff at Millikin University in Decatur, Illinois. During his three years at Millikin, Johnson served as the strength and conditioning coach (1996), the linebackers coach (1997) and the defensive coordinator (1998). During his one season as defensive coordinator, Johnson's Millikin team allowed just 14.1 points per game.

Johnson served as a graduate assistant for Bob Davie's Notre Dame team.

=== Miami (Ohio) ===
In 2000, Johnson left Notre Dame to serve as the linebackers coach at Miami (Ohio). Johnson spent three years at the school and produced four first-team All-Mid-American Conference selections.

=== Cleveland Browns ===
In 2004, Johnson was hired by the Cleveland Browns as their assistant special teams coach.

=== Miami (Ohio) ===
In 2005, Johnson returned to Miami to serve as the program's defensive coordinator for the 2005 and 2006 seasons. During the 2005 season, Johnson's defensive unit allowed 23.5 points per game, which was the 42nd best mark in the nation. Johnson's 2006 team allowed 25.3 points per game.

=== Ohio State ===
In 2007, Johnson joined the Ohio State Buckeyes as their defensive backs coach. Johnson would go on to spend five seasons at Ohio State, where he coached three consensus All-Americans in Malcolm Jenkins, Kurt Coleman and Chimdi Chekwa.

=== Arkansas ===
In 2011, after Jim Tressel resigned from Ohio State, Johnson went south to coach the linebackers for Arkansas in 2012. After Bobby Petrino resigned as head coach of the Arkansas program, Johnson was named as the interim head coach until John L. Smith accepted the full-time position. Johnson would switch back to coaching defensive backs in 2013.

=== Purdue ===
In 2014, Johnson joined the Purdue Boilermakers as their defensive backs coach, spending three years at Purdue for three seasons.

=== Temple ===
In January 2017, Johnson was named as the defensive coordinator at Temple under Geoff Collins, who was named the head coach of the Owls the month prior.

=== Ohio State ===
In February 2018, following a one year stint as defensive coordinator at Temple, Johnson re-joined the defensive staff as cornerbacks coach at Ohio State.

=== Oakland / Las Vegas Raiders ===
In 2019, Johnson was hired by the Oakland Raiders as their assistant defensive backs coach under head coach Jon Gruden. In 2021, he was moved to offensive assistant, as new defensive coordinator Gus Bradley had brought several defensive coaches with him from his previous stint with the Los Angeles Chargers.

=== Eastern Michigan ===
In May 2022, Johnson was announced as the defensive pass game coordinator and safeties coach at Eastern Michigan. He replaced Fred Reed, who died earlier that month. Eastern Michigan Head Coach Chris Creighton said, "Thinking about the need to find a new coach has felt wrong, uncomfortable, and seemingly impossible. Thankfully, through the natural course of coaches who knew Fred reaching out to offer their condolences, we found the right fit. We thought it would be ideal if we could find a candidate who knew Fred, and had significant relevant coaching experience along with the maturity, sensitivity, and emotional intelligence to be able to come into this very complicated situation. Coach Johnson is this person and he really wants to be here. He will join us in honoring Coach Reed, as we give everything we have to make this program and this team the very best it can be both on and off the field."

== Personal life ==
Johnson and his wife have a son and a daughter.
