= Chad Hamilton =

American football player (born 1991)

Profile
- Position: Guard / Center

Personal information
- Born: October 21, 1991 (age 35); Charleston, South Carolina
- Listed height: 6 ft 2 in (1.88 m)
- Listed weight: 292 lb (132 kg)

Career information
- College: Coastal Carolina
- NFL draft: 2015: undrafted

Awards and highlights
- 3× All-Big South (2012-2014); Consensus FCS All-American (2014)

Chad Hamilton (born October 21, 1991) is a retired American football offensive guard and center. He played college football at Coastal Carolina. After going undrafted in the 2015 NFL draft, he was signed as an undrafted free agent by the Chicago Bears. Before the start of the Bears' 2015 training camp, Hamilton announced his retirement.

== College career ==
A four-year starter, Hamilton redshirted and started at left guard in 2011 before kicking out to left tackle. He started every game there the last three seasons, earning consensus All-American honors as a senior in 2014 - three-time All-Big South honors the last three years.

== Professional career ==
=== 2015 NFL draft ===
Pro-Day Results
Height	Weight	40-yard dash	10-yard split	20-yard split	20 ss	3-cone	Vert	Broad	BP
6-2	297	4.93	1.70	2.86	4.63	7.58	30	9'04"	19

=== Chicago Bears ===
After going undrafted in the 2015 NFL draft, he signed with the Chicago Bears. Hamilton later retired during the offseason that year.
