= 2017 Gasparilla Bowl =

2017 Bad Boy Mowers Gasparilla Bowl
- 10th Gasparilla Bowl
Temple Owls	FIU Panthers
(6–6)	(8–4)
The American	C-USA
28	3
Head coach: Geoff Collins	Head coach: Butch Davis
	1	2	3	4	Total
Temple	0	7	7	14	28
FIU	0	0	3	0	3
- Date: December 21, 2017
- Season: 2017
- Stadium: Tropicana Field
- Location: St. Petersburg, Florida
- MVP: Frank Nutile (QB, Temple)
- Referee: Tim O'Dey (MAC)
- Attendance: 16,363
- Payout: US$1,300,000

United States TV coverage
- Network: ESPN; RedVoice, LLC
- Announcers: Mike Couzens, John Congemi, Kris Budden

The 2017 Gasparilla Bowl was a college football bowl game played on December 21, 2017, at Tropicana Field in St. Petersburg, Florida. The tenth edition of the game previously known as the St. Petersburg Bowl, it featured the Temple Owls of the American Athletic Conference against the FIU Panthers of Conference USA. It began at 8:00 p.m. EST and aired on ESPN. It was one of the 2017–18 bowl games that concluded the 2017 FBS football season. The Owls defeated the Panthers by a score of 28–3.

This was the first edition of the bowl to use the Gasparilla naming, a nod to the legend of José Gaspar, a mythical pirate who is the inspiration for Tampa's Gasparilla Pirate Festival. Sponsored by lawnmower manufacturing company Bad Boy Mowers, the game was officially known as the Bad Boy Mowers Gasparilla Bowl. This was the last edition of the bowl played at Tropicana Field.

== Teams ==
The game featured the Temple Owls against the FIU Panthers and was the first-ever meeting between the two schools.

=== Temple Owls ===
This was Temple's first Gasparilla Bowl and the third consecutive (and seventh overall) bowl game for the Owls, extending the longest bowl streak in school history.

=== FIU Panthers ===
This was FIU's third bowl game in school history and second Gasparilla Bowl; the Panthers had previously played in the 2011 game (when it was known as the Beef 'O' Brady's Bowl), losing to Marshall by a score of 20–10. That game was the most recent bowl that the Panthers had appeared in prior to this Gasparilla Bowl, which snapped their five-year streak of not appearing in a bowl.

== Game summary ==
=== Scoring summary ===
Scoring summary

Quarter	Time	Drive			Team	Scoring information	Score	
Quarter	Time	Plays	Yards	TOP	Team	Scoring information	TEM	FIU
2	11:45	7	68	3:08	TEM	Frank Nutile 4-yard touchdown run, Aaron Boumerhi kick good	7	0
3	3:12	12	62	4:13	FIU	27-yard field goal by José Borregales	7	3
3	0:28	8	75	2:44	TEM	David Hood 1-yard touchdown run, Aaron Boumerhi kick good	14	3
4	7:26	5	93	1:48	TEM	Isaiah Wright 45-yard touchdown reception from Frank Nutile, Aaron Boumerhi kick good	21	3
4	3:54	5	23	2:09	TEM	Ryquell Armstead 5-yard touchdown run, Aaron Boumerhi kick good	28	3
"TOP" = time of possession. For other American football terms, see Glossary of American football.							28	3

=== Statistics ===
	1	2	3	4	Total
Owls	0	7	7	14	28
Panthers	0	0	3	0	3

Statistics	Temple	FIU
First downs	20	20
Total offense, yards	400	252
Rushes-yards (net)	41–141	41–83
Passing yards (net)	259	169
Passes, Comp-Att-Int	19–29–0	17–34–2
Time of Possession	29:52	30:08

Team	Category	Player	Statistics
Temple	Passing	Frank Nutile	19/29, 259 yds, 1 TD
Temple	Rushing	David Hood	14 car, 76 yds, 1 TD
Temple	Receiving	Keith Kirkwood	6 rec, 96 yds
FIU	Passing	Maurice Alexander	16/33, 162 yds, 2 INT
FIU	Rushing	Napoleon Maxwell	11 car, 52 yds
FIU	Receiving	Austin Maloney	3 rec, 42 yds
