= T. J. Green =

American football player (born 1995)

No. 32, 36, 39, 14
- Position: Safety

Personal information
- Born: March 15, 1995 (age 31); Sylacauga, Alabama, U.S.
- Listed height: 6 ft 3 in (1.91 m)
- Listed weight: 215 lb (98 kg)

Career information
- High school: Sylacauga
- College: Clemson (2013–2015)
- NFL draft: 2016: 2nd round, 57th overall pick

Career history
- Indianapolis Colts (2016–2018); Seattle Seahawks (2018); New Orleans Saints (2019); Carolina Panthers (2019–2020); Atlanta Falcons (2020–2021); Houston Texans (2021); Saskatchewan Roughriders (2022)*; Birmingham Stallions (2023); Memphis Showboats (2023–2024)
- * Offseason or practice squad member only

Career NFL statistics
- Total tackles: 103
- Pass deflections: 4
- Stats at Pro Football Reference

T. J. Green (born March 15, 1995) is an American former professional football player who was a safety in the National Football League (NFL). He played college football for the Clemson Tigers and was selected by the Indianapolis Colts in the second round of the 2016 NFL draft. He also played for the Seattle Seahawks, New Orleans Saints, Carolina Panthers, Atlanta Falcons, Houston Texans, Birmingham Stallions, and Memphis Showboats.

== Early life ==
Green attended Sylacauga High School in Sylacauga, Alabama. He played wide receiver and as a senior had nine receiving touchdowns. He committed to Clemson University to play college football.

== College career ==
Green played wide receiver his freshman year at Clemson in 2013, recording two receptions over 12 games. Prior to his sophomore year in 2014, he switched to safety. He played in 11 games with one start and had 18 tackles and an interception. As a junior, he became a starter, recording 95 tackles with a sack. After the season, Green entered the 2016 NFL draft.

== Professional career ==
External videos
- T.J. Green's NFL Combine workout
- T.J. Green's 40-yard dash

Pre-draft measurables
Height	Weight	Arm length	Hand span	40-yard dash	10-yard split	20-yard split	20-yard shuttle	Three-cone drill	Vertical jump	Broad jump	Bench press
6 ft 2 1/2 in (1.89 m)	209 lb (95 kg)	32 in (0.81 m)	9 5/8 in (0.24 m)	4.34 s	1.52 s	2.52 s	4.41 s	7.10 s	35.5 in (0.90 m)	10 ft 9 in (3.28 m)	13 reps
All values from NFL Combine/Clemson's Pro Day

=== Indianapolis Colts ===
==== 2016 ====
The Indianapolis Colts selected Green in the second round (57th overall) of the 2016 NFL draft. He was the third safety selected in 2016.

External videos
- Colts select T.J. Green 57th overall

On May 23, 2016, the Colts signed Green to a four-year, $4.16 million contract that includes $1.87 million guaranteed and a signing bonus of $1.23 million.

Throughout training camp, Green competed against Clayton Geathers and Winston Guy for the job as the starting free safety. Head coach Chuck Pagano named Green the backup free safety behind Clayton Geathers to begin the regular season.

He made his professional regular season debut and first career start in the Colts' season-opener against the Detroit Lions and recorded three combined tackles in their 39–35 loss before leaving in the fourth quarter with a sprained ankle. Green earned the start in place of Geathers who was inactive due to a broken bone in his foot he sustained in training camp. The sprained ankle sidelined Green for the Colts' Week 2 loss at the Denver Broncos. In Week 9, Green started at free safety after Mike Adams was inactive due to a groin injury he sustained. He finished the Colts' 31–26 victory at the Green Bay Packers with a season-high six combined tackles. He finished his rookie season with 42 combined tackles (32 solo) and two pass deflections in 15 games and four starts. He finished 91st out of 91 qualifying safeties in Pro Football Focus' overall grade and coverage grade in 2016.

==== 2017 ====
Green entered training camp competing for a job as a backup safety against Clayton Geathers, Matthias Farley, Andrew Williamson, Tyvis Powell, Earl Wolff, Ronald Martin, Lee Hightower, and Tyson Graham. Defensive coordinator Ted Monachino held a competition between Green and Farley for the job as starting strong safety after rookie Malik Hooker sustained numerous injuries during organized team activities and camp. Head coach Chuck Pagano named him the backup strong safety behind Farley to start the regular season.

Prior to Week 8, Green was named the starting free safety after Hooker tore his ACL and MCL the previous week and was placed on injured reserve for the remainder of the season. In his first start of the season, Green recorded four solo tackle during the Colts' 34–23 loss at the Cincinnati Bengals in Week 8. On December 14, 2017, Green collected a season-high nine combined tackles during a 25–13 loss to the Broncos. Green finished the 2017 season with 45 combined tackles (31 solo) and a pass deflection in 16 games and seven starts. Pro Football Focus gave Green an overall grade of 73.9, ranking 60th among all qualifying safeties in 2017.

==== 2018 ====
On September 1, 2018, Green was waived/injured by the Colts and was placed on injured reserve. He was released on September 6, 2018.

=== Seattle Seahawks ===
On October 3, 2018, Green signed with the Seattle Seahawks. On October 22, 2018, Green left the team, citing his lack of desire to play football any more, and planned to retire.

=== New Orleans Saints ===
On July 25, 2019, Green signed with the New Orleans Saints. He was waived on August 31, 2019, and was signed to the practice squad the next day. He was promoted to the active roster on December 16, 2019. Three days later Green was waived after the Saints signed safety D. J. Swearinger.

=== Carolina Panthers ===
Green was claimed off waivers by the Carolina Panthers on December 19, 2019. He was released on September 5, 2020, and re-signed to the practice squad on September 11. He was released on September 19.

=== Atlanta Falcons ===
On September 30, 2020, Green was signed to the Atlanta Falcons practice squad. He was elevated to the active roster on December 12 for the team's week 14 game against the Los Angeles Chargers, and reverted to the practice squad after the game. He signed a reserve/future contract on January 4, 2021.

On October 25, 2021, Green was released by the Falcons.

=== Houston Texans ===
On November 2, 2021, Green was signed to the Houston Texans practice squad. He signed a reserve/future contract with the Texans on January 11, 2022. The Texans released Green on March 22, 2022.

=== Saskatchewan Roughriders ===
On September 27, 2022, Green was signed to the practice squad of the Saskatchewan Roughriders of the Canadian Football League. He was released on October 26, 2022.

=== Birmingham Stallions ===
Green was selected by the Arlington Renegades of the XFL in the 10th round of the defensive backs portion of the 2023 XFL draft, but instead signed with the Birmingham Stallions of the United States Football League (USFL) on December 16, 2022. He was released by the Stallions on May 3, 2023.

=== Memphis Showboats ===
On May 11, 2023, Green signed with the Memphis Showboats of the USFL.

== NFL career statistics ==
Regular season statistics
Year	Team	Games		Tackles				Interceptions						Fumbles	
Year	Team	GP	GS	Comb	Solo	Ast	Sack	PD	Int	Yds	Avg	Lng	TD	FF	FR
2016	IND	15	4	43	32	11	0.0	2	0	0	0.0	0	0	0	0
2017	IND	16	7	45	31	14	0.0	1	0	0	0.0	0	0	0	0
2018	SEA	0	0	DNP											
2019	NO	1	0	2	2	0	0.0	0	0	0	0.0	0	0	0	0
2019	CAR	1	0	0	0	0	0.0	0	0	0	0.0	0	0	0	0
2020	ATL	1	0	0	0	0	0.0	0	0	0	0.0	0	0	0	0
2021	ATL	6	1	13	8	5	0.0	1	0	0	0.0	0	0	0	0
Career		40	12	103	73	30	0.0	4	0	0	0	0	0	0	0
