= 2015 Houston Cougars football team =

American college football season

2015 Houston Cougars football

The American champion The American West Division co-champion Peach Bowl champion

The American Championship, W 24–13 vs. Temple

Peach Bowl, W 38–24 vs. Florida State
- Conference: American Athletic Conference
- West Division

Ranking
- Coaches: No. 8
- AP: No. 8
- Record: 13–1 (7–1 The American)
- Head coach: Tom Herman (1st season)
- Offensive coordinator: Major Applewhite (1st season)
- Offensive scheme: Spread
- Defensive coordinator: Todd Orlando (1st season)
- Co-defensive coordinator: Craig Naivar (1st season)
- Base defense: 3–4
- Home stadium: TDECU Stadium

2015 American Athletic Conference football standings
	Conf.			Overall
Team	W		L	W		L
East Division
Temple x	7	–	1	10	–	4
South Florida	6	–	2	8	–	5
Cincinnati	4	–	4	7	–	6
UConn	4	–	4	6	–	7
East Carolina	3	–	5	5	–	7
UCF	0	–	8	0	–	12
West Division
No. 8 Houston xy$	7	–	1	13	–	1
No. 18 Navy x	7	–	1	11	–	2
Memphis	5	–	3	9	–	4
Tulsa	3	–	5	6	–	7
Tulane	1	–	7	3	–	9
SMU	1	–	7	2	–	10
Championship: Houston 24, Temple 13
$ – Conference champion; x – Division champion/co-champions; y – Championship game participant; As of December 31, 2015; Rankings from AP Poll

The 2015 Houston Cougars football team represented the University of Houston in the 2015 NCAA Division I FBS football season. It was the 68th year of season play for Houston. The team was led by first-year head coach Tom Herman and played its home games at TDECU Stadium in Houston. The Houston Cougars football team is a member of the American Athletic Conference in its West Division. They finished the season 13–1, 7–1 in American Athletic play to win a share of the West Division title. Due to their head-to-head win over Navy, they represented the West Division in the inaugural American Athletic Championship Game where they defeated Temple to become American Athletic Conference champions. As the highest ranked team from the "Group of Five", they received an automatic bid to a New Year's Six bowl. They were invited to the Peach Bowl where they defeated Florida State.

== Schedule ==
Date	Time	Opponent	Rank	Site	TV	Result	Attendance
September 5	7:00 p.m.	Tennessee Tech*		TDECU Stadium; Houston, TX	ESPN3	W 52–24	30,479
September 12	11:00 a.m.	at Louisville*		Papa John's Cardinal Stadium; Louisville, KY	ACCRSN	W 34–31	50,019
September 26	7:00 p.m.	Texas State*		TDECU Stadium; Houston, TX	ESPN3	W 59–14	35,257
October 3	11:00 a.m.	at Tulsa		Chapman Stadium; Tulsa, OK	CBSSN	W 38–24	17,146
October 8	7:00 p.m.	SMU		TDECU Stadium; Houston, TX (rivalry)	ESPN2	W 49–28	25,204
October 16	8:00 p.m.	at Tulane	No. 24	Yulman Stadium; New Orleans, LA	ESPNU	W 42–7	21,522
October 24	11:00 a.m.	at UCF	No. 21	Bright House Networks Stadium; Orlando, FL	ESPNews	W 59–10	28,350
October 31	6:00 p.m.	Vanderbilt*	No. 18	TDECU Stadium; Houston, TX	ESPN2	W 34–0	29,565
November 7	2:30 p.m.	Cincinnati^{†}	No. 25	TDECU Stadium; Houston, TX	ESPN2	W 33–30	32,889
November 14	6:00 p.m.	No. 21 Memphis	No. 24	TDECU Stadium; Houston, TX	ESPN2	W 35–34	42,159
November 21	2:30 p.m.	at UConn	No. 19	Rentschler Field; East Hartford, CT	ESPNU	L 17–20	26,879
November 27	11:00 a.m.	No. 15 Navy		TDECU Stadium; Houston, TX	ABC	W 52–31	40,562
December 5	11:00 a.m.	No. 22 Temple	No. 19	TDECU Stadium; Houston, TX (The American Championship)	ABC	W 24–13	35,721
December 31	11:00 a.m.	vs. No. 9 Florida State*	No. 18	Georgia Dome; Atlanta, GA (Peach Bowl)	ESPN	W 38–24	71,007
*Non-conference game; ^{†}Homecoming; Rankings from AP Poll (and CFP Rankings, after November 3) - Released prior to game; All times are in Central time

Schedule source:

== Game summaries ==
=== Tennessee Tech ===
	1	2	3	4	Total
Golden Eagles	3	7	0	14	24
Cougars	14	10	7	21	52

=== At Louisville ===
	1	2	3	4	Total
Cougars	7	3	7	17	34
Cardinals	7	7	3	14	31

=== Texas State ===
	1	2	3	4	Total
Bobcats	7	0	0	7	14
Cougars	14	28	10	7	59

=== At Tulsa ===
	1	2	3	4	Total
Cougars	7	14	3	14	38
Golden Hurricane	10	0	7	7	24

=== SMU ===
	1	2	3	4	Total
Mustangs	14	7	0	7	28
Cougars	7	21	14	7	49

=== At Tulane ===
	1	2	3	4	Total
#24 Cougars	7	21	14	0	42
Green Wave	0	7	0	0	7

=== At UCF ===
	1	2	3	4	Total
#21 Cougars	7	17	28	7	59
Knights	7	3	0	0	10

=== Vanderbilt ===
	1	2	3	4	Total
Commodores	0	0	0	0	0
#18 Cougars	7	13	14	0	34

=== Cincinnati ===
	1	2	3	4	Total
Bearcats	0	14	8	8	30
#18 Cougars	7	7	16	3	33

=== Memphis ===
	1	2	3	4	Total
#25 Tigers	3	17	7	7	34
#16 Cougars	0	7	7	21	35

=== At UConn ===
	1	2	3	4	Total
#13 Cougars	0	3	0	14	17
Huskies	7	3	3	7	20

=== Navy ===
	1	2	3	4	Total
#16 Midshipmen	7	7	3	14	31
#21 Cougars	14	10	14	14	52

=== Temple (The American Championship) ===
	1	2	3	4	Total
#20 Owls	0	3	7	3	13
#17 Cougars	7	10	7	0	24

=== Vs. Florida State (Peach Bowl) ===
	1	2	3	4	Total
#14 Cougars	7	14	0	17	38
#9 Seminoles	3	0	7	14	24

== Rankings ==
Ranking movements Legend: ██ Increase in ranking ██ Decrease in ranking — = Not ranked RV = Received votes
	Week															
Poll	Pre	1	2	3	4	5	6	7	8	9	10	11	12	13	14	Final
AP	—	—	RV	RV	RV	RV	24	21	18	18	16	13	21	17	14	8
Coaches	—	—	RV	RV	RV	RV	RV	22	19	18	16	14	21	18	16	8
CFP	Not released									25	24	19	—	19	18	Not released

== Roster ==
2015 Houston Cougars football team roster
Players
Coaches
Offense

Pos.	#	Name	Class
QB	1	Greg Ward Jr.	Jr
WR	2	Donald Gage	So
QB	3	Kyle Postma	So
QB	4	Jose Blankenship	Fr
WR	5	Ra'Shaad Samples	So
WR	6	Latrell Martin	RFr
QB	8	Hunter McCoy	Jr
WR	9	Devin Smith	Fr
WR	10	Demarcus Ayers	Jr
QB	12	Adam Schulz	Sr
QB	13	Mason McClendon	RFr
WR	14	Isaiah Johnson	RFr
WR	15	Linell Bonner	So
QB	16	Bear Fenimore	RFr
QB	17	Christian Jones	So
QB	18	Brandon Garza	RFr
QB	19	Luke Klingler	RFr
WR	19	Derek McLemore	Jr
RB	20	Kaliq Kokuma	RFr
WR	21	Chance Allen	Jr
RB	22	Ryan Jackson	Sr
RB	24	Davon Crookshank	Fr
RB	25	Javin Webb	So
RB	26	Tyreik Gray	Fr
WR	27	Desmond Debose	Sr
RB	28	Josh Burrell	Fr
WR	29	Christian Martinez	Fr
WR	30	Eric Parker	Jr
RB	31	Duke Catalon	RFr
RB	32	Kevrin Justice	Fr
WR	34	Colton Cerday	Fr
RB	35	Kenneth Farrow	Sr
WR	41	Kelechi Ejekam	Sr
TE	45	Tyler McCloskey	Jr
RB	49	Blake Hirsch	RFr
OL	56	Damien Parris	Sr
OL	59	Zorrell Ezell	Jr
OL	60	Alex Cooper	Sr
OL	62	Jarrid Williams	Fr
OL	63	Ben Dew	Sr
OL	64	Kyle Marrs	Jr
OL	65	Carter Wall	Sr
OL	68	James Works	Jr
OL	69	Will Noble	Fr
OL	70	Mac Long	Jr
OL	71	Zach Johnson	Sr
OL	72	Mason Denley	RFr
OL	73	Colton Freeman	RFr
OL	74	Josh Jones	Fr
OL	75	Marcus Oliver	So
OL	79	Josh Thomas	So
WR	80	Cameron Oliver	Jr
TE	81	Ryan Deshotel	Fr
TE	82	Romello Brooker	RFr
TE	84	Corey Manges	Jr
WR	85	John Leday	So
TE	86	Kobe Idumwonyi	Fr
TE	87	Hayden Daniels	Sr
WR	88	Steven Dunbar	So
TE	89	Byron Simpson	So

Defense

Pos.	#	Name	Class
S	2	Khalil Williams	So
CB	3	William Jackson III	Sr
CB	4	Tyler White	Sr
LB	5	Camden Ross	Fr
CB	6	Howard Wilson	So
LB	8	Emeke Egbule	Fr
MLB	9	Matthew Adams	So
S	10	Michael Eke	Fr
MLB	12	D'Juan Hines	So
CB	13	Joeal Williams	RFr
S	15	Garrett Davis	RFr
S	16	Adrian McDonald	Sr
DE	17	Chauntez Jackson	Jr
CB	18	Lee Hightower	Sr
CB	19	Marcus Dillard	Sr
OLB	20	Roman Brown	RFr
OLB	21	Ralph Harvey Jr.	Jr
S	23	Trevon Stewart	Sr
CB	24	Jeremy Winchester	RFr
CB	26	Brandon Wilson	Jr
DL	27	D.J. Jenkins	Fr
S	28	Darius Gilbert	Fr
S	30	Earl Foster	Sr
OLB	32	Khari Dotson	RFr
OLB	33	Ja'Von Shelley	RFr
OLB	36	Nomluis Fruge	So
MLB	37	Luke Stice	Sr
CB	38	Andrew Robertson	RFr
OLB	41	Steven Taylor	Jr
LB	43	Leroy Godfrey	Fr
MLB	44	Elandon Roberts	Sr
LB	45	Jordan Milburn	Fr
LB	51	Rasheed Tynes	Jr
DE	52	Jerard Carter	RFr
MLB	54	Cameron Doubenmier	So
MLB	55	Davonte Thomas	Jr
OLB	81	Tyus Bowser	Jr
DE	83	Marc Reid	Jr
DE	90	Zach Vaughan	RFr
DL	91	Nick Thurman	So
DL	92	Kameron Eloph	Fr
DT	93	B.J. Singleton	Jr
DE	94	Cameron Malveaux	Jr
DT	95	Tomme Mark	Sr
DT	99	Melvin Holland	Sr

Special teams

Pos.	#	Name	Class
P	31	Logan Piper	Sr
K	38	Joel Scarbrough	Fr
K	39	Kyle Bullard	Sr
K	40	Elijah Ruiz	Fr
K	42	Blake Boyles	Fr
K	47	Ty Cummings	Jr
LS	48	Zach Faires	Jr
LS	53	Nolan Frese	Sr
LS	57	Payton Pardee	Fr

Head coach

- Tom Herman

Coordinators/assistant coaches

- Todd Orlando – Defensive Coordinator, Linebackers
- Major Applewhite – Offensive Coordinator, Quarterbacks
- Craig Naivar – Assoc. Head Coach, Co-Defensive Coordinator, Safeties
- Oscar Giles – Asst. Head Coach, Defensive Line
- Jason Washington – Special Teams Coordinator, Cornerbacks
- Drew Mehringer – Assistant Coach, Wide Receivers, Recruiting Coord.
- Corby Meekins – Assistant Coach, Tight Ends, Fullbacks
- Kenith Pope – Assistant Coach, Running Backs
- Derek Warehime – Assistant Coach, Offensive Line
- Yancy McKnight – Director for Football Sports Performance
- Rod Grace – Associate Director for Football Sports Performance
- Fernando Lovo – Assistant AD for Football Operations
- Dallas Blacklock – Director for High School Relations
- Adrian Mayes – Director for Recruiting
- Marcus McGraw – Director for Player Personnel
- Tory Teykl – Director for Internal Operations
- Grace Muscarello – Assistant Director for Recruiting
- Thomas Dunson – Football Analyst
- Joaquin Garcia – Football Analyst
- Kenny Guiton – Offensive Graduate Assistant
- Eric Soza – Offensive Graduate Assistant
- Dan Carrel – Defensive Graduate Assistant
- Nathan Putscher – Defensive Graduate Assistant
- Landren Hines – Defensive Quality Control
- Robyn Hardeway – Executive Assistant
- Ryan Deatrick – Assistant Director for Football Sports Performance

Legend

- (C) Team captain
- (S) Suspended
- (I) Ineligible
- Injured
- Redshirt

Roster
