= 2015 Cincinnati Bearcats football team =

American college football season

2015 Cincinnati Bearcats football

Hawaii Bowl, L 7–42 vs. San Diego State
- Conference: American Athletic Conference
- East Division
- Record: 7–6 (4–4 AAC)
- Head coach: Tommy Tuberville (3rd season)
- Offensive coordinator: Eddie Gran (3rd season)
- Offensive scheme: Spread
- Co-defensive coordinators: Robert Prunty (3rd season); Steve Clinkscale (1st season)
- Base defense: 4–3
- Home stadium: Nippert Stadium

2015 American Athletic Conference football standings
	Conf.			Overall
Team	W		L	W		L
East Division
Temple x	7	–	1	10	–	4
South Florida	6	–	2	8	–	5
Cincinnati	4	–	4	7	–	6
UConn	4	–	4	6	–	7
East Carolina	3	–	5	5	–	7
UCF	0	–	8	0	–	12
West Division
No. 8 Houston xy$	7	–	1	13	–	1
No. 18 Navy x	7	–	1	11	–	2
Memphis	5	–	3	9	–	4
Tulsa	3	–	5	6	–	7
Tulane	1	–	7	3	–	9
SMU	1	–	7	2	–	10
Championship: Houston 24, Temple 13
$ – Conference champion; x – Division champion/co-champions; y – Championship game participant; As of December 31, 2015; Rankings from AP Poll

The 2015 Cincinnati Bearcats football team represented the University of Cincinnati in the 2015 NCAA Division I FBS football season. The team returned on campus to Nippert Stadium after playing 2014 home games at Paul Brown Stadium during stadium renovation. The Bearcats were led by third-year head coach Tommy Tuberville and were members of the Eastern Division of the American Athletic Conference. They finished the season 7–6 overall and 4–4 in American Athletic lay to finish in a tie for third place in the East Division. They were invited to the Hawaii Bowl where they lost to San Diego State.

== Schedule ==
Date	Time	Opponent	Site	TV	Result	Attendance
September 5	7:00 pm	Alabama A&M*	Nippert Stadium; Cincinnati, OH	FS Ohio/ESPN3	W 52–10	39,095
September 12	8:00 pm	Temple	Nippert Stadium; Cincinnati, OH	ESPNews	L 26–34	38,112
September 19	3:30 pm	at Miami (OH)*	Yager Stadium; Oxford, OH (Victory Bell)	ESPN3	W 37–33	18,484
September 24	7:30 pm	at Memphis	Liberty Bowl Memorial Stadium; Memphis, TN (rivalry)	ESPN	L 46–53	45,172
October 1	7:30 pm	Miami (FL)*	Nippert Stadium; Cincinnati, OH	ESPN	W 34–23	40,101
October 16	8:00 pm	at BYU*	LaVell Edwards Stadium; Provo, UT	ESPN	L 24–38	57,612
October 24	4:30 pm	UConn^{†}	Nippert Stadium; Cincinnati, OH	CBSSN	W 37–13	40,124
October 31	12:00 pm	UCF	Nippert Stadium; Cincinnati, OH (rivalry)	ESPNews	W 52–7	30,131
November 7	3:30 pm	at No. 25 Houston	TDECU Stadium; Houston, TX	ESPN2	L 30–33	32,889
November 14	7:30 pm	Tulsa	Nippert Stadium; Cincinnati, OH	ESPNews	W 49–38	35,015
November 20	8:00 pm	at South Florida	Raymond James Stadium; Tampa, FL	CBSSN	L 27–65	26,522
November 28	12:00 pm	at East Carolina	Dowdy–Ficklen Stadium; Greenville, NC	CBSSN	W 19–16	40,743
December 24	8:00 pm	vs. San Diego State*	Aloha Stadium; Honolulu, HI (Hawaii Bowl)	ESPN	L 7–42	22,793
*Non-conference game; ^{†}Homecoming; Rankings from AP Poll (and CFP Rankings, after November 3) - Released prior to game; All times are in Eastern time

Schedule source:

== Game summaries ==
=== Alabama A&M ===
Team	1	2	3	4	Total
Bulldogs	7	0	0	3	10
• Bearcats	7	28	17	0	52

- Location: Cincinnati, OH
- Game attendance: 39,095
- TV announcers (FSO/ESPN3): Tom Gelehrter, Frank Stams, Lauren Gardner

The clash with Alabama A&M was the first game played in newly renovated Nippert Stadium. The announced attendance of 39,095 broke a two-year-old Nippert attendance record, despite a weak opponent and a one-hour-and-forty-five minute weather delay. UC buried Alabama A&M as expected, in a game matching a major college FBS (Football Bowl Subdivision) team against a weaker FCS (Football Championship Subdivision) team. UC went 9–4 last year, while Alabama A&M was 4–8. UC junior quarterback Gunner Kiel was 18-for-22 passing for 233 yards and two touchdowns for UC, all in the first half. Redshirt freshman Hayden Moore made his college debut in replacing Kiel at quarterback late in the first half. Moore went 8-for-14 passing for 107 yards and a touchdown. Senior wide receiver Shaq Washington had seven catches for 69 yards. Senior wide receiver Johnny Holton had three catches for 81 yards and two TDs. Senior wide receiver Alex Chisum had four catches for 55 yards and a touchdown. UC junior running back Tion Green had 17 carries for 127 yards and a touchdown. Senior running back Hosey Williams, the starter, had 18 carries for 95 yards and a touchdown. Sophomore running back Mike Boone had 13 carries for 86 yards and two TDs. UC had 636 total yards (340 passing, 296 rushing). Alabama A&M had 246 total yards, only 98 rushing. UC officials had previously expected a sellout crowd, which failed to materialize most likely because of the inclement conditions and late start time.

=== Temple ===
Team	1	2	3	4	Total
• Owls	3	7	21	3	34
Bearcats	0	6	6	14	26

- Location: Cincinnati, OH
- Game attendance: 38,112
- TV announcers (ESPNews): Eamon McAnaney, Rocky Boiman

The preseason AAC-favorite Bearcats lost despite outgaining the Owls 557–296 on offense and earning a staggering 21 more first downs (34–13). Quarterback Gunner Kiel threw four interceptions and senior running back Hosey Williams lost a fumble to create a 5–1 turnover deficit for Cincinnati which, when added to a successful surprise onside kick by Temple, played a massive role in deciding the game for the Owls. Despite going down 34–12 early in the fourth quarter, the Bearcats nevertheless clawed their way back, driving in two touchdowns to close the gap to one score. After recovering a nearly-disastrous fumble from Temple running back Jahad Thomas, who had 193 yards and a rushing score on 23 carries in addition to a kickoff return for a touchdown, UC drove the ball to the Temple five yard-line with just under twenty seconds to play and a timeout remaining. However, Kiel's pass in the end zone to wide receiver Chris Moore bounced out of Moore's hands and into the diving grasp of Temple linebacker Tyler Matakevich. It was Matakevich's second interception on a tipped pass, and it decimated any hopes of a Bearcat comeback.

=== Miami (OH) ===
120th Battle for the Victory Bell

Team	1	2	3	4	Total
• Bearcats	14	10	6	7	37
RedHawks	7	16	7	3	33

- Location: Oxford, OH
- Game attendance: 18,484
- TV announcers (ESPN3): Jim Barbar, Dustin Fox

Style points aside, favored UC rallied for a 37–33 win over rival Miami University before 18,484 fans on a sunny Saturday at Yager Stadium. Backup quarterback Hayden Moore, a redshirt freshman playing in relief of injured Gunner Kiel, scored on a 1-yard plunge to give UC the go-ahead points with 1:13 left. Bearcats linebacker Eric Wilson, who had a game-high 18 tackles, broke up a Miami fourth-down pass at the RedHawks’ 29-yard line to seal things with 48 seconds left. The Bearcats retained the Victory Bell for the 10th straight year in its series with Miami. The Bearcats were 20-point favorites but again struggled to beat the RedHawks, who have played UC close for the past three years. The game was close throughout. UC led 14–7 after one quarter and 24–23 at halftime. It was 30–30 after three quarters. UC lost Kiel to a head injury on a roughing-the-passer call with 12:52 left in the third quarter, after he went 15-for-26 passing for 145 yards and a touchdown. Moore stepped in and helped keep UC alive, completing 7–14 passes for 118 yards and also rushing for 29 yards and a touchdown. But he also committed four turnovers in the fourth quarter alone, via two interceptions and two lost fumbles.

=== Memphis ===
Team	1	2	3	4	Total
Bearcats	10	20	3	13	46
• Tigers	14	14	3	22	53

- Location: Memphis, TN
- Game attendance: 45,172
- TV announcers (ESPN): Joe Tessitore, Jesse Palmer, Kaylee Hartung

Redshirt freshman Hayden Moore broke a major record. It was also a UC loss, in a 53–46 shootout against Memphis at Liberty Bowl Memorial Stadium. A crowd of 45,172 gasped for air and a national TV audience watched in amazement. Moore threw for 557 yards to break the 47-year-old UC single-game passing mark held by Bearcats great Greg Cook (554). Moore did it in a little over three-plus quarters, after starter Gunner Kiel departed with a neck injury with 3:25 left in the first period. Moore completed 31-of-53 passes for 557 yards, with four touchdowns and two interceptions. Cook's record was 554 yards against Ohio University in 1968. UC had 752 total yards overall, breaking the school mark of 711 set against UConn in 2009. UC also set a school mark with 38 first downs, and the 752 yards were the most Memphis has ever allowed. The Bearcats fell to 2–2 overall and 0–2 in the American Athletic Conference East, after being the preseason media pick to win both the East and overall league title. Memphis, the preseason AAC West favorite, improved to 4–0 overall and 1–0 in the West.

=== Miami (FL) ===
Team	1	2	3	4	Total
Hurricanes	13	7	0	3	23
• Bearcats	14	13	0	7	34

- Location: Cincinnati, OH
- Game attendance: 40,101
- TV announcers (ESPN): Joe Tessitore, Jesse Palmer, David Pollack, Kaylee Hartung

The Cincinnati Bearcats achieved a win that saw University of Cincinnati students storm the field on the evening of the 2nd of October in 2015. UC surprised the Miami Hurricanes 34–23 before a Nippert Stadium record crowd of 40,101, for the most prestigious victory of the three-year Tommy Tuberville coaching era. A national TV audience also watched on ESPN, with the Bearcats 7-point underdogs to one of America's glamour college programs. The odds were stacked against UC, with regular quarterback Gunner Kiel among several key Bearcats who did not play. Kiel watched from the press box. Running back Mike Boone, wide receivers Johnny Holton, and Chris Moore as well as safety Andre Jones were among other injured Bearcats who did not take part in the match. The Bearcats (3–2) led most of the way in beating the Hurricanes (3–1), who had not lost to UC since their first meeting in 1947. UC has since lost 11 straight games to Miami, most were high-scoring games on the scale of last year's 55–34 Hurricanes win in Miami. UC is now 2–5 under Tuberville against Power Five teams. That does not include two games in 2013 against Rutgers (win) and Louisville (loss), which then were in the AAC with UC.

=== BYU ===
Team	1	2	3	4	Total
Bearcats	10	7	7	0	24
• Cougars	0	10	7	21	38

- Location: Provo, UT
- Game attendance: 57,612
- TV announcers (ESPN): Adam Amin, Kelly Stouffer, Olivia Harlan

With the scenic Wasatch Mountain Range towering majestically above the stadium, the Cincinnati Bearcats enjoyed both the view and the football game for most of Friday night here. Then came the fourth quarter. UC came apart down the stretch and lost 38–24 to Brigham Young University after being physically manhandled and outscored 21–0 in the final period. UC redshirt freshman quarterback Hayden Moore was sacked eight times in his second career start. Former starter Gunner Kiel dressed but did not play after missing the previous game with a neck injury. The Bearcats' defense, on the other hand, failed to sack BYU freshman quarterback Tanner Mangum. The UC pass rush was consistently stymied. Mangum was 19-for-32 passing for 252 yards and two touchdowns, with one interception. Moore was 15-for-30 passing for 219 yards, with no touchdowns or interceptions. But the heavy pressure took a toll. A noisy crowd of 57,612 attended at LaVell Edwards Stadium. A national TV audience also watched on ESPN as the UC offense stalled and the Bearcats were gashed for three touchdowns in a six-minute stretch of the fourth quarter. UC (3–3) was denied a second consecutive quality win. The Bearcats had been idle after upsetting the Miami Hurricanes 34–23 in their last game on Oct. 1. BYU (5–2) was a 4 1/2-point favorite, according to Las Vegas lines. UC dominated the first quarter, building a 10–0 lead with a 205–19 edge in total yardage. The Bearcats built their lead to 17–3 before settling for a 17–10 halftime lead. UC dominated the first half statistically, with a 262–166 edge in total yards. In the second half, UC was outgained 283–75.

=== UConn ===
Team	1	2	3	4	Total
Huskies	7	3	0	3	13
• Bearcats	14	10	3	10	37

- Location: Cincinnati, OH
- Game attendance: 40,124
- TV announcers (CBSSN): Dave Ryan, Corey Chavous, Lauren Gardner

Gunner Kiel admittedly was upset at losing his University of Cincinnati quarterback job, but he flourished Saturday upon regaining the No. 1 role. Kiel, making his first start in a month, was 26-for-35 passing for 327 yards and two touchdowns and also rushed for a touchdown as UC crushed UConn 37–13, in the Bearcats' Homecoming game at rainy Nippert Stadium. Kiel was injured in two different games in September and Hayden Moore temporarily took the quarterback job. UC went 1–1 with redshirt freshman Moore starting, after going 2–2 with junior Kiel to start the year. With Moore battered for eight sacks in a 38–24 loss at BYU last week and suffering some tendinitis this week, Kiel regained his job with strong practice performances. UC coach Tommy Tuberville said Kiel was unhappy about watching from the sidelines last week. That was indeed the case, Kiel said. Kiel put on a show before paid crowd of 40,124, a Nippert record. The game was sold out in advance but actual attendance was less than capacity, with intermittent showers during the game. UC senior running back Hosey Williams rushed for 140 yards and a touchdown, and sophomore running back Mike Boone rushed for 117 yards. Junior running back Tion Green rushed for 71 yards, as UC totaled 285 yards rushing. Senior wide receiver Shaq Washington had eight catches for 78 yards. Washington needs eight catches to become the UC career receptions leader. Junior linebacker Eric Wilson led the defense with 11 tackles. Junior safety Zach Edwards and freshman linebacker Bryce Jenkinson also had eight tackles. "Our D-line stepped up big tonight, and everything starts with them," Edwards said. "They stopped the run and their pass rush was great. (UConn) couldn't get the ball off." The Bearcats (4–3 overall, 1–2 American Athletic Conference East) won easily despite falling behind 7–0 early. The Bearcats accumulated a 612–266 advantage in total yardage.

=== UCF ===
Team	1	2	3	4	Total
Knights	0	0	0	7	7
• Bearcats	21	14	14	3	52

- Location: Cincinnati, OH
- Game attendance: 30,131
- TV announcers (ESPNews): Jim Barbar (play-by-play) and Rene Ingoglia (color commentator)

It was perfect football weather, crisp and overcast. Perfect for the University of Cincinnati to slaughter winless Central Florida, and for UC senior Shaq Washington to break the Bearcats' career record for receptions. Not to mention, a perfect day passing (15-for-15, 319 yards, five touchdown passes) by UC junior quarterback Gunner Kiel. UC routed the Knights 52–7 at Nippert Stadium on Saturday afternoon, as wide receiver Washington set a UC mark with his 205th career catch. Washington, from Cleveland suburb Maple Heights, broke the record on his eighth catch of the day: A 20-yard reception late in the third quarter. UC fans gave Washington a standing ovation. The Bearcats career record had been 204 catches, shared by Mardy Gilyard (UC 2005; 2007–2009), Dominick Goodman (2005–2008) and LaDaris Vann (1999–2002). "I tried not to focus on it a lot, but at the same time, a lot of people were talking about it," Washington said. Washington was determined to get the record at home, with UC playing at Houston next week. Washington also had his first career two-touchdown game. For the day, Washington had eight catches for 72 yards. "It was a unique deal for Shaq to break the record here at home," Tuberville said. "His family is there and the fans get to see it. As I just told the team, that's a unique deal to break a record like that, that's been around here for a while." The temperature was in the upper 40s at kickoff, and a Nippert season-low crowd of 30,131 was treated to a blowout. UC emptied its bench, and fans began leaving early with the game in hand. UC (5–3, 2–2 American Athletic Conference East) had 726 yards of total offense, second best in school history. UCF had 313 total yards. Kiel's 15-for-15 day marked the most completions without an incompletion by any Football Bowl Subdivision player in the last 20 years, according to ESPN Stats & Info. UC moved within one win of bowl eligibility and achieved its first two-game winning streak this season.

=== Houston ===
Team	1	2	3	4	Total
Bearcats	0	14	8	8	30
• #18 Cougars	7	7	16	3	33

- Location: Houston, TX
- Game attendance: 32,889
- TV announcers (ESPN2): Dave LaMont, Ray Bentley, Allison Williams

=== Tulsa ===
Team	1	2	3	4	Total
Golden Hurricane	7	7	10	14	38
• Bearcats	14	7	14	14	49

- Location: Cincinnati, OH
- Game attendance: 35,015
- TV announcers (ESPNews): Eamon McAnaney, Rocky Boiman

The Class of 2016 Seniors took their final bow at Nippert Stadium, winning a wild shootout with Tulsa. Gunner Kiel threw for 386 and two scores as the Bearcats scored 21 straight points to rally from a 24–21 3rd quarter deficit. The Bearcats were 13–17 on 3rd down conversions and rang up 652 yards of total offense scoring over 30 points for the 4th straight home game.

=== South Florida ===
Team	1	2	3	4	Total
Bearcats	0	3	17	7	27
• Bulls	27	24	7	7	65

- Location: Tampa, FL
- Game attendance: 26,522
- TV announcers (CBSSN): Dave Ryan, Corey Chavous, Lauren Gardner

15 seconds into the game, Bulls QB BJ Flowers hit WR Rodney Flowers on a 67-yard bomb and the rout was essentially on. The Bulls kept scoring and scoring and scoring in front of gleeful home crowd and a national audience. The Bearcats could seemingly do little to stop the Bulls onslaught. The Bulls rang up 51 points in the first half alone and trampled the Bearcats with 361 rushing yards. The Bulls scored each of the five times they got into the Red Zone. The loss prevented the Bearcats from becoming bowl-eligible.

=== East Carolina ===
Team	1	2	3	4	Total
• Bearcats	0	6	10	3	19
Pirates	10	0	0	6	16

- Location: Greenville, NC
- Game attendance: 40,743
- TV announcers (CBSSN): Dave Ryan, Corey Chavous, Lauren Gardner

The Bearcats became bowl eligible at the very last second. Andrew Gantz's 42-yard field goal at the final gun won a sloppy 19–16 decision over East Carolina in Greenville NC. The Bearcats fell behind in the 1st quarter again, this time by 10 but chipped away with 16 straight points to take a 16–10 lead, the Pirates tied the game in the 4th quarter but missed the extra point that would have given them the lead. The Bearcats Shaq Washington set a school record with 15 receptions in the game. UC eked out the win though they dominated the time of possession having the ball over 36 minutes.

=== San Diego State-Hawaii Bowl ===
Hawai'i Bowl

Team	1	2	3	4	Total
• Aztecs	14	7	7	14	42
Bearcats	0	0	0	7	7

- Location: Honolulu, HI
- Game start: 3:05 p.m.
- Game weather: 75 deg. NE 10
- Referee: Rodney Burnette
- TV announcers (ESPN/ESPN Radio): Adam Amin, Greg McElroy, and Holly Rowe/Kevin Winter, Mike Golic Sr., and Mike Golic Jr.

Rashaad Penny took the opening kickoff and returned it 100 yards for a touchdown. The Bearcats came into the game slight favorites though the Aztecs were on a 9-game win streak. Donnell Pumprhey ran for a touchdown, threw for another. The Aztecs scored 42 unanswered points, the last on an interception return for a touchdown. A late Mike Boone TD run with under 4 minutes to play stopped the Bearcats first shutout in ten years but a national TV audience saw the Bearcats lose their 3rd straight bowl game under Tommy Tuberville by a 42–7 score.

== Roster ==
2015 Cincinnati Bearcats football team roster
Players
Coaches
Offense

Pos.	#	Name	Class
WR	1	Kahlil Lewis	Fr
WR	2	Mekale McKay	Sr
WR	3	Johnny Holton	Sr
RB	4	Hosey Williams	Sr
RB	5	Mike Boone	So
RB	7	Tion Green	Jr
QB	9	Hayden Moore	Fr
QB	10	Luke Wright	Fr
QB	11	Gunner Kiel (C)	Jr
QB	12	Ross Trail	Fr
QB	13	Avery Peterson (I)	Fr
QB	14	Sam Fette	Fr
WR	15	Chris Moore	Sr
WR	17	Jamil Kamara (I)	So
TE	18	Tyler Cogswell	So
WR	19	Shaq Washington (C)	Sr
WR	20	Tshumbi Johnson	So
TE	22	Deionte Buckley (I)	Jr
RB	24	Taylor Boose	Fr
WR	25	Max Morrison	Sr
RB	30	Chad Banschbach	So
RB	34	Joshuwa Holloman (injured)	Fr
OL	50	Ja'Merez Bowen	Fr
OL	51	Delonte Murray	Jr
OL	52	Reed Armagost	Fr
OL	53	Tyler McGarr (injured)	Fr
OL	54	Luke Callahan	Fr
OL	57	Morgan James	Fr
OL	58	Chad West	Sr
OL	59	Deyshawn Bond	Jr
OL	64	Will Steur	So
OL	65	Idarius Rey	Jr
OL	66	David Niehaus	So
OL	68	Jeff Duncan	Fr
OL	71	Korey Cunningham	So
OL	72	Garrett Campbell	So
OL	73	Ryan Leahy	Jr
OL	74	Justin Murray	Sr
OL	76	Evan Mallory	Fr
OL	77	John Kurtz	Fr
OL	78	Parker Ehinger (C)	Jr
OL	79	Ryan Stout	Fr
WR	80	Alex Chism	Sr
TE	81	DJ Dowdy	Jr
WR	82	Braxton Neal (injured)	Fr
TE	83	Josiah Deguara (injured)	Fr
WR	84	Nate Cole	Jr
WR	85	Brayden Beard	Fr
WR	87	Justin Sawmiller	Sr
WR	88	Frank Labady	Fr
TE	89	Jake Elfers	Fr

Defense

Pos.	#	Name	Class
S	2	Tyrell Gilbert	Fr
CB	3	Christian Angulo	Fr
CB	4	Zach Edwards	Jr
S	5	Mike Tyson	Jr
LB	6	Clemente Casseus (S)	Sr
LB	7	Aaron Brown	So
CB	8	Adrian Witty (injured) (C)	Sr
CB	9	Leviticus Payne	Sr
CB	10	Trevon Story	Fr
CB	11	John James	Sr
S	12	Jarred Evans	Sr
CB	13	Grant Coleman	Jr
CB	14	J.J. Pinckney	Fr
CB	15	Sheldon Doss	Fr
LB	17	Matthew Draper	Fr
S	20	Carter Jacobs	So
CB	21	Davon Witherspoon	Fr
LB	23	Eric Wilson	Jr
S	24	Malik Clements	Fr
CB	25	Alex Thomas	Fr
CB	26	Bobby Brown	So
S	29	Andre Jones	Jr
CB	30	Chris Murphy (I)	So
CB	32	Linden Stephens	So
LB	33	Jaylyin Minor	Fr
LB	38	Mason Antoun	Sr
LB	40	Kevin Brown	Sr
LB	41	Kevin Hyland	Sr
LB	42	Antonio Kinard	Jr
DE	44	Marquise Copeland	Fr
LB	45	Bryce Jenkinson	Fr
DE	47	Landon Brazile	Fr
LB	48	Kevin Mouhon	Fr
DE	50	Sione Tongamoa	Fr
DE	51	Kimoni Fitz	Fr
DT	52	Keith Minor	Fr
LB	53	Franklin Bruscianelli	So
DE	55	Caleb Ashworth	Fr
DE	56	Mark Wilson	So
DT	63	Chris Ferguson	So
DL	77	Beau Harmon	So
DL	86	Tyler Lyon	Fr
DT	90	Hakeem Allonce	Sr
DL	92	Silverberry Mouhon (C)	Sr
DT	94	Chris Burton	So
DE	95	Isaac Harshaw	Fr
DT	75	Cortez Broughton	Fr
DT	97	Norman Oglesby	Fr
DE	98	Lyndon Johnson	Jr
DT	99	Alex Pace	Jr

Special teams

Pos.	#	Name	Class
K	16	Andrew Gantz	So
P	26	Sam Geraci	So
K	34	Josh Pasley	Jr
LS	47	Jon Vincent	So
LS	61	Kirk Willis (C)	Sr
K	97	Ryan Jones	Fr

Head coach

- Tommy Tuberville

Coordinators/assistant coaches

- Robert Prunty – Associate Head Coach/Co-Defensive Coordinator/DL
- Steve Clinkscale – Co-Defensive Coordinator/Defensive Backs
- Eddie Gran – Offensive Coordinator/Running Backs
- Darren Hiller – Offensive Line
- Darin Hinshaw – Passing Game Coordinator/Quarterbacks
- Kenny Ingram – Defensive Tackles
- Jeff Koonz – Linebackers
- Ty Linder – Special Teams Coordinator/Tight Ends
- Blake Rolan – Wide Receivers
- Joe Walker – Director of Football Strength & Conditioning
- Orlando Smith – Assistant Director, Football Strength & Conditioning
- David Neill – Assistant Director, Football Strength & Conditioning
- Reid Kagy – Assistant Director, Football Strength & Conditioning
- Kenyon Blue – Graduate Assistant - Defense
- Luke Goodwin – Graduate Assistant - Defense
- Nick Grimes – Graduate Assistant - Offense
- Jesse Smith – Graduate Assistant - Offense
- Austen Bujnoch – Quality Control - Offense
- John Widecan – Associate AD/Football Operations
- Bob Mangine – Associate AD/Sports Medicine
- Sherry Murray – Assistant to the Head Football Coach
- Blake Reid – Assistant AD/Equipment Operations
- Greg Bruner – Director of Football Recruiting
- Adam Niemeyer – Director of Football Video
- Doug Rosfeld – Director of Player Development
- Vince Suriano – Director of High School & Player Relations
- Jena Bushelman – Administrative Asst./Football Recruiting
- Carl Schmid – Assistant Director/Football Video

Legend

- (C) Team captain
- (S) Suspended
- (I) Ineligible
- Injured
- Redshirt

Roster
Last update: August 30, 2015

== Awards and milestones ==
Weekly Awards
Player	Award	Date Awarded	Ref.
Eric Wilson	Defensive Player of the Week	September 21, 2015	
Gunner Kiel	Offensive Player of the Week	November 2, 2015	
Andrew Gantz	Special Teams Player of the Week	November 30, 2015	

All-AAC
Player	Position	Team
Parker Ehinger	OT	1
Shaq Washington	WR	2
Ryan Leahy	OG	2
Deyshawn Bond	C	2
Silverberry Mouhon	DL	2
Andrew Gantz	K	2
Zach Edwards	S	HM

== Players in the 2016 NFL draft ==
Player	Position	Round	Pick	NFL club
Parker Ehinger	G	4	105	Kansas City Chiefs
Chris Moore	WR	4	107	Baltimore Ravens
