= 2015 SMU Mustangs football team =

American college football season

2015 SMU Mustangs football
- Conference: American Athletic Conference
- West Division
- Record: 2–10 (1–7 The American)
- Head coach: Chad Morris (1st season)
- Offensive coordinator: Joe Craddock (1st season)
- Offensive scheme: Power spread
- Defensive coordinator: Van Malone (1st season)
- Base defense: 4–2–5
- Home stadium: Gerald J. Ford Stadium

2015 American Athletic Conference football standings
	Conf.			Overall
Team	W		L	W		L
East Division
Temple x	7	–	1	10	–	4
South Florida	6	–	2	8	–	5
Cincinnati	4	–	4	7	–	6
UConn	4	–	4	6	–	7
East Carolina	3	–	5	5	–	7
UCF	0	–	8	0	–	12
West Division
No. 8 Houston xy$	7	–	1	13	–	1
No. 18 Navy x	7	–	1	11	–	2
Memphis	5	–	3	9	–	4
Tulsa	3	–	5	6	–	7
Tulane	1	–	7	3	–	9
SMU	1	–	7	2	–	10
Championship: Houston 24, Temple 13
$ – Conference champion; x – Division champion/co-champions; y – Championship game participant; As of December 31, 2015; Rankings from AP Poll

The 2015 SMU Mustangs football team represented Southern Methodist University in the 2015 NCAA Division I FBS football season. They were led by first-year head coach Chad Morris. They played their home games at Gerald J. Ford Stadium in University Park, Texas, an enclave of Dallas, and were members of the Western Division of the American Athletic Conference. They finished the season 2–10, 1–7 in American Athletic play to finish in a tie for fifth place in the Western Division.

== Schedule ==
Date	Time	Opponent	Site	TV	Result	Attendance
September 4	6:00 p.m.	No. 4 Baylor*	Gerald J. Ford Stadium; University Park, TX	ESPN	L 21–56	32,047
September 12	6:00 p.m.	North Texas*	Gerald J. Ford Stadium; University Park, TX (Safeway Bowl)	ESPN3	W 31–13	25,401
September 19	7:00 p.m.	at No. 3 TCU*	Amon G. Carter Stadium; Fort Worth, TX (Battle for the Iron Skillet)	FSN	L 37–56	41,827
September 26	6:00 p.m.	No. 9 (FCS) James Madison*^{†}	Gerald J. Ford Stadium; University Park, TX	ESPN3	L 45–48	22,314
October 3	3:00 p.m.	East Carolina	Gerald J. Ford Stadium; University Park, TX	ESPNews	L 23–49	17,136
October 8	7:00 p.m.	at Houston	TDECU Stadium; Houston, TX (rivalry)	ESPN2	L 28–49	25,204
October 24	3:00 p.m.	at South Florida	Raymond James Stadium; Tampa, FL	ESPNews	L 14–38	24,338
October 31	3:00 p.m.	Tulsa	Gerald J. Ford Stadium; University Park, TX	ESPNews	L 31–40	18,127
November 6	7:00 p.m.	No. 22 Temple	Gerald J. Ford Stadium; University Park, TX	ESPN2	L 40–60	17,232
November 14	2:30 p.m.	at No. 20 Navy	Navy–Marine Corps Memorial Stadium; Annapolis, MD (Gansz Trophy)	CBSSN	L 14–55	35,778
November 21	7:00 p.m.	Tulane	Gerald J. Ford Stadium; University Park, TX	ESPNews	W 49–21	15,000
November 28	11:00 a.m.	at Memphis	Liberty Bowl Memorial Stadium; Memphis, TN	ESPNews	L 0–63	30,075
*Non-conference game; ^{†}Homecoming; Rankings from AP Poll (and CFP Rankings, after November 3) released prior to game; All times are in Central time

== Game summaries ==
=== No. 4 Baylor ===
	1	2	3	4	Total
No. 4 Bears	28	0	14	14	56
Mustangs	14	7	0	0	21

Statistics	BAY	SMU
First downs	27	22
Total yards	723	369
Rushing yards	300	203
Passing yards	423	166
Turnovers	1	2
Time of possession	22:08	37:52

Team	Category	Player	Statistics
Baylor	Passing	Seth Russell	15/30, 376 yards, 5 TD, INT
Baylor	Rushing	Shock Linwood	8 rushes, 75 yards
Baylor	Receiving	Corey Coleman	5 receptions, 178 yards, TD
SMU	Passing	Matt Davis	16/23, 166 yards, 2 TD, 2 INT
SMU	Rushing	Matt Davis	24 rushes, 115 yards
SMU	Receiving	Courtland Sutton	3 receptions, 82 yards, 2 TD

=== North Texas ===
	1	2	3	4	Total
Mean Green	3	3	7	0	13
Mustangs	7	0	3	21	31

Statistics	UNT	SMU
First downs	17	27
Total yards	240	444
Rushing yards	112	273
Passing yards	128	171
Turnovers	4	3
Time of possession	24:10	35:50

Team	Category	Player	Statistics
North Texas	Passing	Andrew McNulty	16/34, 128 yards, 2 INT
North Texas	Rushing	Andrew Tucker	10 rushes, 50 yards
North Texas	Receiving	Turner Smiley	3 receptions, 42 yards
SMU	Passing	Matt Davis	17/24, 171 yards, 2 TD
SMU	Rushing	Matt Davis	17 rushes, 125 yards, 2 TD
SMU	Receiving	Courtland Sutton	5 receptions, 65 yards, TD

=== At No. 3 TCU ===
	1	2	3	4	Total
Mustangs	10	7	17	3	37
No. 3 Horned Frogs	14	14	14	14	56

Statistics	SMU	TCU
First downs	23	28
Total yards	508	720
Rushing yards	174	266
Passing yards	334	454
Turnovers	0	1
Time of possession	32:57	27:03

Team	Category	Player	Statistics
SMU	Passing	Matt Davis	18/32, 334 yards, TD
SMU	Rushing	Matt Davis	17 rushes, 62 yards, 2 TD
SMU	Receiving	Courtland Sutton	4 receptions, 115 yards, TD
TCU	Passing	Trevone Boykin	21/30, 454 yards, 5 TD, INT
TCU	Rushing	Aaron Green	21 rushes, 164 yards, 2 TD
TCU	Receiving	Josh Doctson	5 receptions, 171 yards, 2 TD

=== No. 9 (FCS) James Madison ===
	1	2	3	4	Total
No. 9 (FCS) Dukes	10	7	17	14	48
Mustangs	7	7	17	14	45

Statistics	JMU	SMU
First downs	34	24
Total yards	729	494
Rushing yards	440	232
Passing yards	289	262
Turnovers	3	2
Time of possession	28:11	31:49

Team	Category	Player	Statistics
James Madison	Passing	Vad Lee	20/33, 289 yards, 3 TD, 3 INT
James Madison	Rushing	Vad Lee	20 rushes, 276 yards, 2 TD
James Madison	Receiving	Brandon Ravenel	4 receptions, 89 yards, TD
SMU	Passing	Matt Davis	18/30, 262 yards, TD
SMU	Rushing	Matt Davis	17 rushes, 95 yards, 2 TD
SMU	Receiving	Courtland Sutton	5 receptions, 137 yards, TD

=== East Carolina ===
	1	2	3	4	Total
Pirates	7	14	14	14	49
Mustangs	13	10	0	0	23

Statistics	ECU	SMU
First downs	26	21
Total yards	555	329
Rushing yards	306	40
Passing yards	249	289
Turnovers	2	0
Time of possession	32:47	27:13

Team	Category	Player	Statistics
East Carolina	Passing	James Summers	9/10, 153 yards, 2 TD
East Carolina	Rushing	Chris Hairston	18 rushes, 91 yards, TD
East Carolina	Receiving	Trevon Brown	4 receptions, 85 yards, TD
SMU	Passing	Matt Davis	19/37, 249 yards, 2 TD
SMU	Rushing	Xavier Jones	12 rushes, 38 yards
SMU	Receiving	Jeremiah Gaines	4 receptions, 96 yards, TD

=== At Houston ===
	1	2	3	4	Total
Mustangs	14	7	0	7	28
Cougars	7	21	14	7	49

Statistics	SMU	HOU
First downs	21	23
Total yards	399	457
Rushing yards	151	214
Passing yards	248	243
Turnovers	3	1
Time of possession	31:21	28:39

Team	Category	Player	Statistics
SMU	Passing	Matt Davis	21/35, 248 yards, 3 TD
SMU	Rushing	Xavier Jones	10 rushes, 52 yards
SMU	Receiving	Darius Joseph	2 receptions, 63 yards, TD
Houston	Passing	Greg Ward	16/18, 243 yards
Houston	Rushing	Greg Ward	14 rushes, 82 yards, 4 TD
Houston	Receiving	Demarcus Ayers	7 receptions, 91 yards

=== At South Florida ===
	1	2	3	4	Total
Mustangs	7	0	0	7	14
Bulls	3	14	7	14	38

Statistics	SMU	USF
First downs	19	15
Total yards	365	352
Rushing yards	132	251
Passing yards	233	101
Turnovers	4	1
Time of possession	34:48	25:12

Team	Category	Player	Statistics
SMU	Passing	Darrell Colbert Jr.	11/13, 120 yards, TD
SMU	Rushing	Xavier Jones	15 rushes, 51 yards, TD
SMU	Receiving	Courtland Sutton	3 receptions, 56 yards, TD
South Florida	Passing	Quinto Flowers	9/20, 97 yards
South Florida	Rushing	Quinto Flowers	23 rushes, 201 yards, 3 TD
South Florida	Receiving	Chris Barr	3 receptions, 41 yards

=== Tulsa ===
	1	2	3	4	Total
Golden Hurricane	3	20	10	7	40
Mustangs	14	7	3	7	31

Statistics	TLSA	SMU
First downs	22	23
Total yards	419	406
Rushing yards	179	84
Passing yards	240	322
Turnovers	0	2
Time of possession	33:43	26:17

Team	Category	Player	Statistics
Tulsa	Passing	Dane Evans	19/27, 240 yards
Tulsa	Rushing	D'Angelo Brewer	23 rushes, 119 yards, TD
Tulsa	Receiving	Justin Hobbs	7 receptions, 150 yards
SMU	Passing	Matt Davis	19/39, 236 yards, 3 TD, INT
SMU	Rushing	Prescott Line	9 rushes, 33 yards
SMU	Receiving	Courtland Sutton	8 receptions, 165 yards, 2 TD

=== No. 22 Temple ===
	1	2	3	4	Total
No. 22 Owls	14	7	17	22	60
Mustangs	0	17	7	16	40

Statistics	TEM	SMU
First downs		
Total yards		
Rushing yards		
Passing yards		
Turnovers		
Time of possession		

Team	Category	Player	Statistics
Temple	Passing		
Temple	Rushing		
Temple	Receiving		
SMU	Passing		
SMU	Rushing		
SMU	Receiving		

=== At No. 20 Navy ===
	1	2	3	4	Total
Mustangs	0	7	7	0	14
No. 20 Midshipmen	14	14	6	21	55

Statistics	SMU	NAVY
First downs		
Total yards		
Rushing yards		
Passing yards		
Turnovers		
Time of possession		

Team	Category	Player	Statistics
SMU	Passing		
SMU	Rushing		
SMU	Receiving		
Navy	Passing		
Navy	Rushing		
Navy	Receiving		

=== Tulane ===
	1	2	3	4	Total
Green Wave	0	7	7	7	21
Mustangs	14	21	0	14	49

Statistics	TULN	SMU
First downs		
Total yards		
Rushing yards		
Passing yards		
Turnovers		
Time of possession		

Team	Category	Player	Statistics
Tulane	Passing		
Tulane	Rushing		
Tulane	Receiving		
SMU	Passing		
SMU	Rushing		
SMU	Receiving		

=== At Memphis ===
	1	2	3	4	Total
Mustangs	0	0	0	0	0
Tigers	28	28	7	0	63

Statistics	SMU	MEM
First downs		
Total yards		
Rushing yards		
Passing yards		
Turnovers		
Time of possession		

Team	Category	Player	Statistics
SMU	Passing		
SMU	Rushing		
SMU	Receiving		
Memphis	Passing		
Memphis	Rushing		
Memphis	Receiving		

== Roster ==
2015 SMU Mustangs football team roster
Players
Coaches
Offense

Pos.	#	Name	Class
WR	1	Kevin Thomas	Fr
QB	4	Matt Davis	Jr
RB	6	Braeden West	Fr
QB	7	Darrel Colbert Jr.	RFr
QB	8	Ben Hicks	Fr
WR	9	Shelby Walker	So
RB	10	Xavier Jones	Fr
QB	11	Jordan Severt	RFr
WR	12	Xavier Castille	Fr
WR	12	James Proche	Fr
WR	13	Ryheem Malone	So
QB	14	Garrett Krstich	Sr
WR	15	Myron Gailliard	Fr
WR	16	Courtland Sutton	RFr
TE	17	Hunter Herndon	Fr
WR	18	Darius Joseph	Sr
QB	18	Connor Simpson	So
WR	20	Nate Halverson	Jr
RB	21	Darius Durall	So
TE	23	Jeremiah Gaines	Jr
TE	24	Mitchell Kaufman	Fr
RB	25	K.C. Nlemchi	Sr
RB	28	Joseph Paden	Jr
RB	29	Austin DeFreitas	So
TE	39	Keyfer Roberts	RFr
WR	41	Anthony Buffini	Jr
RB	42	Prescott Line	Jr
TE	45	Dylan Dickman	Jr
TE	46	Tony Richards	RFr
OL	51	William Barns	So
OL	52	Taylor Lasecki	Sr
OL	55	Rex Printz	Jr
OL	57	Chad Pursley	RFr
OL	58	Taylor Reich	Sr
OL	62	Travis Fister	So
OL	63	Evan Brown	So
OL	64	Bryce Wilds	Fr
OL	65	Marcus McNeil	Fr
OL	67	Daniel McCarty	Jr
OL	68	Nick Natour	RFr
OL	71	Chauncey Briggs	Jr
OL	72	Braylon Hyder	So
OL	74	Christian Chamagua	Jr
OL	75	Kris Weeks	Sr
OL	76	Jerry Saena	So
OL	77	Keaton Bates	Fr
OL	78	Bozidar Antunovic	Sr
WR	81	Chase Schultz	Fr
WR	82	Cam Winter	Fr
WR	83	Arrius Holleman	Sr
RB	84	Lance Smith	Fr
WR	85	Christian Biedenharn	So
WR	86	Austin Percy	Fr
WR	88	Alex Honey	Fr
TE	89	Christian Holloway	Jr
WR	89	Austin Rolfe	Fr
RB		Aphonso Thomas	Fr

Defense

Pos.	#	Name	Class
LB	1	Jonathan Yenga	Sr
LB	2	Caleb Tuiasosopo	Sr
DB	3	Kevin Johnson	Fr
DB	3	Cedric Lancaster	So
DB	4	David Johnson	Sr
LB	5	Nick Horton	Jr
DB	6	Jesse Montgomery	So
DL	7	Elie Nabushosi	Jr
DB	8	Rodney Clemons	Fr
DB	9	Horace Richardson	Jr
DB	10	Ajee Montes	Jr
LB	11	Kyran Mitchell	RFr
DB	13	Christian Burks	So
DB	15	Jordan Wyatt	RFr
LB	16	Jeremy White	So
LB	17	Jordon Williams	Fr
DB	18	William Jeanlys	RFr
DB	20	A.J. Justice	Jr
DB	21	Deion Sanders Jr.	Jr
LB	22	Matt McNew	Fr
LB	25	Derek Longoria	Sr
DB	26	Troy Castle	Sr
DB	28	Brent Freeman	So
DB	28	Shakiel Randolph	Sr
DB	29	Darrion Millines	Jr
LB	30	Robert Seals	Sr
DB	31	Rashaad Burton	So
LB	32	RC Cox	So
DL	34	Jarvis Pruitt	Jr
DL	35	Delontae Scott	Fr
DL	36	Michael Scott	Fr
LB	40	Carlos Carroll	So
DB	42	Raul Reyes III	RFr
LB	44	Jackson Mitchell	Jr
DE	47	Michael Epley	RFr
LB	48	Anthony Rhone	So
LB	49	Zane Smith	Fr
LB	50	Andrew Adams	Fr
DL	55	Spencer Conley	Sr
DL	66	Myles McCormack	Fr
DE	90	Zach Wood	Sr
DE	91	Spencer Hollie	So
DE	92	Zelt Minor	Jr
DE	93	Mason Gentry	So
DL	94	Chris Biggurs	Fr
DL	95	Andrew McCleneghen	Sr
DL	96	Cameron Smith	Sr
DE	97	Hunter Thedford	Fr
DL	98	Deon Green	Jr
DE	99	Justin Lawler	So

Special teams

Pos.	#	Name	Class
K	14	Josh Williams	Fr
K	27	Chad Hedlund	Sr
P	33	Alex Melvin	Fr
P	35	Jackson Koonce	So
K	38	Michael Armstrong	RFr
P	43	Davis Luster	Fr
P	50	Daniel Chaparro	Jr
LS	53	Nicholas Avantino	RFr
LS	54	Garrett Stotts	Fr
LS	56	Michael Sehlinger	Fr
LS	69	Baxter Cantrell	Fr

Head coach

- Chad Morris

Coordinators/assistant coaches

- Joe Craddock – Offensive Coordinator/Quarterbacks
- Van Malone – Defensive Coordinator
- Dustin Fry – Offensive Line
- Keith Gunn – Tight Ends
- Jess Loepp – Secondary
- Claude Mathis – Running Backs
- Archie McDaniel – Linebackers
- Justin Stepp – Assistant Coach/WR
- Buddy Wyatt – Assistant Coach/DL
- Daric Riley – Special Teams Analyst
- Marc Soltis – Strength Coach
- Sam Ogden – Director of Football Video Services
- Mike Morton – Asst. A.D- Student Health and Well-being
- Randy Ross – Sr. Associate Director of Football Operations
- Mark Smith – Director of Football Recruiting
- Steve Stigall – Associate Director of Football Ops/Player Development
- Albert Veytia – Director of Equipment Operations
- Bobby Reid – Graduate Assistant
- Isaiah deLaura – Football Video GA
- Terry Gardner – Administrative Assistant to Head Coach
- Shay Taylor – Administrative Assistant
- Brooke Stepp – Recruiting Operations Coordinator
- Stephen Sorrells – Graduate Assistant/Offensive Line
- Chris Scott – Graduate Assistant/Defense

Legend

- (C) Team captain
- (S) Suspended
- (I) Ineligible
- Injured
- Redshirt

Roster
