= 2015 UConn Huskies football team =

American college football season

2015 UConn Huskies football

St. Petersburg Bowl, L 10–16 vs. Marshall
- Conference: American Athletic Conference
- East Division
- Record: 6–7 (4–4 AAC)
- Head coach: Bob Diaco (2nd season)
- Offensive coordinator: Frank Verducci (1st season)
- Offensive scheme: Spread
- Defensive coordinator: Anthony Poindexter (2nd season)
- Base defense: 3–4
- Home stadium: Pratt & Whitney Stadium at Rentschler Field

2015 American Athletic Conference football standings
	Conf.			Overall
Team	W		L	W		L
East Division
Temple x	7	–	1	10	–	4
South Florida	6	–	2	8	–	5
Cincinnati	4	–	4	7	–	6
UConn	4	–	4	6	–	7
East Carolina	3	–	5	5	–	7
UCF	0	–	8	0	–	12
West Division
No. 8 Houston xy$	7	–	1	13	–	1
No. 18 Navy x	7	–	1	11	–	2
Memphis	5	–	3	9	–	4
Tulsa	3	–	5	6	–	7
Tulane	1	–	7	3	–	9
SMU	1	–	7	2	–	10
Championship: Houston 24, Temple 13
$ – Conference champion; x – Division champion/co-champions; y – Championship game participant; As of December 31, 2015; Rankings from AP Poll

The 2015 UConn Huskies football team represented the University of Connecticut (UConn) as a member of the American Athletic Conference (AAC) during the 2015 NCAA Division I FBS football season. Led by second-year head coach Bob Diaco, the Huskies compiled an overall record of 6–7 with a mark of 4–4 in conference play, tying for third place in the AAC's East Division. UConn was invited to the St. Petersburg Bowl, where the Huskies lost to Marshall. The team played home games at Pratt & Whitney Stadium at Rentschler Field in East Hartford, Connecticut.

The highlight of the season was a stunning 20–17 upset win overthe No. 13-ranked Houston Cougars. This was the last season in which Huskies were bowl eligible until 2022.

== Schedule ==
Date	Time	Opponent	Site	TV	Result	Attendance
September 3	7:30 pm	No. 4 (FCS) Villanova*	Pratt & Whitney Stadium at Rentschler Field; East Hartford, CT	SNY	W 20–15	26,113
September 12	12:00 pm	Army*	Pratt & Whitney Stadium at Rentschler Field; East Hartford, CT	CBSSN	W 22–17	28,260
September 19	12:00 pm	at No. 22 Missouri*	Faurot Field; Columbia, MO	ESPN	L 6–9	70,079
September 26	12:00 pm	Navy	Pratt & Whitney Stadium at Rentschler Field; East Hartford, CT	CBSSN	L 18–28	33,204
October 2	10:15 pm	at BYU*	LaVell Edwards Stadium; Provo, UT	ESPN2	L 13–30	56,393
October 10	3:45 pm	at UCF	Bright House Networks Stadium; Orlando, FL (Civil Conflict)	ESPNews	W 40–13	26,669
October 17	12:00 pm	South Florida^{†}	Pratt & Whitney Stadium at Rentschler Field; East Hartford, CT	ESPNU	L 20–28	31,719
October 24	4:30 pm	at Cincinnati	Nippert Stadium; Cincinnati, OH	CBSSN	L 13–37	40,124
October 30	7:00 pm	East Carolina	Pratt & Whitney Stadium at Rentschler Field; East Hartford, CT	ESPNU	W 31–13	23,116
November 7	4:00 pm	at Tulane	Yulman Stadium; New Orleans, LA	ESPNews	W 7–3	26,775
November 21	3:30 pm	No. 13 Houston	Pratt & Whitney Stadium at Rentschler Field; East Hartford, CT	ESPNU	W 20–17	26,879
November 28	7:00 pm	at No. 25 Temple	Lincoln Financial Field; Philadelphia, PA	ESPNU	L 3–27	28,236
December 26	11:00 am	vs. Marshall*	Tropicana Field; St. Petersburg, FL (St. Petersburg Bowl)	ESPN	L 10–16	14,652
*Non-conference game; ^{†}Homecoming; Rankings from AP Poll released prior to the game; All times are in Eastern time

== Game summaries ==
=== Villanova ===
	1	2	3	4	Total
No. 4 (FCS) Wildcats	0	9	0	6	15
Huskies	6	0	7	7	20

=== Army ===
	1	2	3	4	Total
Black Knights	3	7	0	7	17
Huskies	3	9	7	3	22

=== At No. 22 Missouri ===
	1	2	3	4	Total
Huskies	6	0	0	0	6
No. 22 Tigers	2	0	7	0	9

=== Navy ===
	1	2	3	4	Total
Midshipmen	7	14	0	7	28
Huskies	3	7	0	8	18

=== At BYU ===
	1	2	3	4	Total
Huskies	0	7	3	3	13
Cougars	7	0	3	20	30

=== At UCF ===
	1	2	3	4	Total
Huskies	9	14	17	0	40
Knights	3	0	0	10	13

=== South Florida ===
	1	2	3	4	Total
Bulls	0	7	14	7	28
Huskies	0	3	10	7	20

=== At Cincinnati ===
	1	2	3	4	Total
Huskies	7	3	0	3	13
Bearcats	14	10	3	10	37

=== East Carolina ===
	1	2	3	4	Total
Pirates	6	0	0	7	13
Huskies	3	7	14	7	31

=== At Tulane ===
	1	2	3	4	Total
Huskies	7	0	0	0	7
Green Wave	0	3	0	0	3

=== No. 13 Houston ===
	1	2	3	4	Total
No. 13 Cougars	0	3	0	14	17
Huskies	7	3	3	7	20

=== At No. 25 Temple ===
	1	2	3	4	Total
Huskies	0	0	0	3	3
No. 25 Owls	7	3	10	7	27

=== Vs. Marshall (St. Petersburg Bowl) ===
	1	2	3	4	Total
Huskies	7	0	3	0	10
Thundering Herd	7	6	0	3	16
