= 2015 Tulane Green Wave football team =

American college football season

2015 Tulane Green Wave football
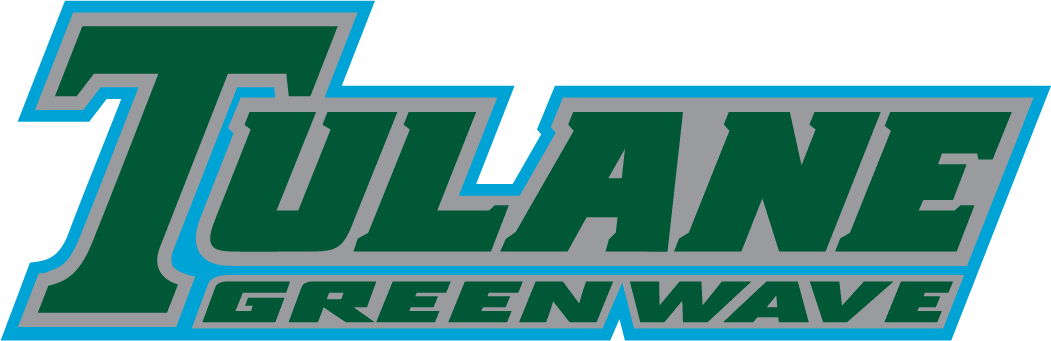
- Conference: American Athletic Conference
- West Division
- Record: 3–9 (1–7 AAC)
- Head coach: Curtis Johnson (4th season)
- Offensive coordinator: Eric Price (4th season)
- Offensive scheme: Pro-style
- Co-defensive coordinators: Jason Rollins (1st season); Lionel Washington (4th season)
- Base defense: 3–4 or 4–3
- Home stadium: Yulman Stadium

2015 American Athletic Conference football standings
	Conf.			Overall
Team	W		L	W		L
East Division
Temple x	7	–	1	10	–	4
South Florida	6	–	2	8	–	5
Cincinnati	4	–	4	7	–	6
UConn	4	–	4	6	–	7
East Carolina	3	–	5	5	–	7
UCF	0	–	8	0	–	12
West Division
No. 8 Houston xy$	7	–	1	13	–	1
No. 18 Navy x	7	–	1	11	–	2
Memphis	5	–	3	9	–	4
Tulsa	3	–	5	6	–	7
Tulane	1	–	7	3	–	9
SMU	1	–	7	2	–	10
Championship: Houston 24, Temple 13
$ – Conference champion; x – Division champion/co-champions; y – Championship game participant; As of December 31, 2015; Rankings from AP Poll

The 2015 Tulane Green Wave football team represented Tulane University in the 2015 NCAA Division I FBS football season. They were led by fourth-year head coach Curtis Johnson and played home games at Yulman Stadium. They were members of the Western Division of the American Athletic Conference. They finished the season 3–9, 1–7 in American Athletic play to finish in a tie for fifth place.

On November 28, head coach Curtis Johnson was fired. He finished at Tulane with a four-year record of 15–34.

== Before the season ==
=== Recruits ===
College recruiting (2015)
Name	Hometown	School	Height	Weight	Commit date
Nigel Anderson; RB	Reserve, LA	East St. John	6 ft 0 in (1.83 m)	202 lb (92 kg)	Oct 1, 2014
Nigel Anderson; RB	Recruit ratings: Scout: Rivals: 247Sports: (NR)				
Darius Black; DB	Belle Chasse, LA	Belle Chasse	5 ft 11 in (1.80 m)	170 lb (77 kg)	May 21, 2014
Darius Black; DB	Recruit ratings: Scout: Rivals: 247Sports: ESPN: (74)				
Zachary Block; K	Clermont, FL	East Ridge	6 ft 4 in (1.93 m)	185 lb (84 kg)	Jan 25, 2015
Zachary Block; K	Recruit ratings: Scout: Rivals: 247Sports: ESPN: (74)				
Leeward Brown; OL	Miramar, FL	Miramar	6 ft 3 in (1.91 m)	345 lb (156 kg)	Feb 1, 2015
Leeward Brown; OL	Recruit ratings: Scout: Rivals: 247Sports: ESPN: (78)				
Malik Eugene; Ath	Lafayette, LA	Acadiana	5 ft 10 in (1.78 m)	162 lb (73 kg)	Jul 27, 2014
Malik Eugene; Ath	Recruit ratings: Scout: Rivals: 247Sports: ESPN: (72)				
Jeremie Francis; DB	New Orleans, LA	Warren Easton	5 ft 11 in (1.80 m)	175 lb (79 kg)	Apr 22, 2014
Jeremie Francis; DB	Recruit ratings: Scout: Rivals: 247Sports: ESPN: (71)				
Devin Glenn; RB	New Orleans, LA	Warren Easton	5 ft 8 in (1.73 m)	170 lb (77 kg)	Mar 19, 2014
Devin Glenn; RB	Recruit ratings: Scout: Rivals: 247Sports: ESPN: (71)				
Douglas Henry; DB	New Iberia, LA	Westgate	6 ft 1 in (1.85 m)	180 lb (82 kg)	May 21, 2014
Douglas Henry; DB	Recruit ratings: Scout: Rivals: 247Sports: ESPN: (70)				
Andrew Hicks; Ath	Belle Chasse, LA	Belle Chasse	6 ft 2 in (1.88 m)	196 lb (89 kg)	Feb 3, 2015
Andrew Hicks; Ath	Recruit ratings: Scout: Rivals: 247Sports: (NR)				
Keyshawn Mcleod; OL	Port Charlotte, FL	Port Charlotte	6 ft 5 in (1.96 m)	245 lb (111 kg)	Nov 18, 2014
Keyshawn Mcleod; OL	Recruit ratings: Scout: Rivals: 247Sports: (NR)				
Rickey Preston; WR	Boutte, LA	Hahnville	6 ft 1 in (1.85 m)	180 lb (82 kg)	May 7, 2015
Rickey Preston; WR	Recruit ratings: Scout: Rivals: 247Sports: ESPN: (77)				
Taris Shenall; DB	Marrero, LA	John Ehret	5 ft 10 in (1.78 m)	161 lb (73 kg)	May 8, 2014
Taris Shenall; DB	Recruit ratings: Scout: Rivals: 247Sports: (NR)				
Dedrick Shy; WR	New Orleans, LA	Warren Easton	6 ft 1 in (1.85 m)	160 lb (73 kg)	Jan 7, 2015
Dedrick Shy; WR	Recruit ratings: Scout: Rivals: 247Sports: (NR)				
Keeyon Smart; WR	Baton Rouge, LA	McKinley	6 ft 4 in (1.93 m)	300 lb (140 kg)	Apr 16, 2014
Keeyon Smart; WR	Recruit ratings: Scout: Rivals: 247Sports: ESPN: (71)				
Roderic Teamer; DB	New Orleans, LA	Brother Martin	6 ft 0 in (1.83 m)	205 lb (93 kg)	Dec 4, 2014
Roderic Teamer; DB	Recruit ratings: Scout: Rivals: 247Sports: (NR)				
John Washington; DT	West Monroe, LA	West Monroe	6 ft 3 in (1.91 m)	275 lb (125 kg)	Jan 18, 2015
John Washington; DT	Recruit ratings: Scout: Rivals: 247Sports: (NR)				
Brian Webb; DT	New Orleans, LA	Miller-McCoy	6 ft 3 in (1.91 m)	260 lb (120 kg)	Oct 19, 2014
Brian Webb; DT	Recruit ratings: Scout: Rivals: 247Sports: (NR)				
Darius Williams; WR	New Orleans, LA	McDonogh 35	6 ft 2 in (1.88 m)	171 lb (78 kg)	Feb 4, 2015
Darius Williams; WR	Recruit ratings: Scout: Rivals: 247Sports: (NR)				
Overall recruit ranking: Scout: 114 Rivals: 104 247Sports: 87
Note: In many cases, Scout, Rivals, 247Sports, On3, and ESPN may conflict in their listings of height and weight.; In these cases, the average was taken. ESPN grades are on a 100-point scale.; Sources: "2015 Tulane Football Commitment List". Rivals.; "2015 Tulane Commits". Scout.; "Tulane Green Wave 2015". ESPN.; "Scout.com Team Recruiting Rankings". Scout.; "2015 Team Ranking". Rivals.com.; "2015 Tulane Green Wave football team". 247Sports.

=== Award watch lists ===
Chris Taylor

- Outland Trophy
- Lombardi Award

Parry Nickerson

- Jim Thorpe Award

Royce LaFrance

- Lombardi Award

Nico Marley

- Lombardi Award

== Roster ==
2015 Tulane Green Wave football team roster
Players
Coaches
Offense

Pos.	#	Name	Class
QB	1	Devin Powell	Jr
RB	3	Sherman Badie	So
QB	7	Dylan Richman	So
WR	8	Devon Breaux	Jr
WR	9	Teddy Veal	So
WR	10	Fletcher Barnes	So
QB	12	Tanner Lee	So
WR	13	David Dubriel	So
QB	14	Glen Cuiellette	Fr
QB	16	Jordy Joseph	Sr
WR	19	Terren Encalade	Fr
RB	22	Marshall Wadleigh	Jr
RB	25	Josh Rounds	Jr
RB	26	Dontrell Hilliard	So
RB	33	Lazedrick Thompson	Jr
WR	38	Frank Thomas	So
WR	44	Alec Macias	Sr
RB	46	Sergio Medina	Jr
C	50	Brandon Godfrey	So
C	51	Junior Diaz	Fr
G	61	Colton Hanson	Jr
G	66	Nathan Shienle	Jr
G	67	Bob Bradley	Sr
OT	68	Arturo Uzdavinis	Sr
OL	69	Anthony Taylor	So
G	71	Jason Stewart	So
OT	72	John Leglue	Fr
G	73	Alex Paul	Jr
OT	74	Devon Johnson	Fr
G	75	Chris Taylor	Jr
OT	78	Todd Jacquet	Jr
OT	79	Kenneth Santa Marina	So
TE	81	Sydie London	Sr
TE	83	Trey Scott	Fr
TE	84	Charles Jones	So
WR	85	Larry Dace	Sr
RB	86	Leondre James	So
TE	89	Kendall Ardoin	Fr
RB		Nigel Anderson	Fr
OL		Leeward Brown	Fr
RB		Devin Glenn	Fr
WR		Andrew Hicks	Fr
OL		Keyshawn McLeod	Fr
OT		Keeyon Smart	Fr
WR		Darius Williams	Fr

Defense

Pos.	#	Name	Class
S	2	Darion Monroe	Sr
LB	7	Edward Williams	Jr
S	10	Leonard Davis	Jr
S	13	William Townsend	So
CB	17	Parry Nickerson	So
LB	20	Nico Marley	Jr
CB	21	Donnie Lewis	Fr
CB	23	Richard Allen	Jr
S	27	Richard Carthon	Sr
S	30	Tristan Cooper	So
CB	32	Stephon Lofton	Fr
DB	34	Jarrod Franklin	So
S	35	Sam Scofield	Sr
LB	37	Rene Fleury	So
CB	39	Sam Hurley	So
LB	40	Zachery Harris	So
DE	44	Luke Jackson	So
S	47	Carlton Williams	Fr
DE	48	Royce LaFrance	Sr
LB	52	Eric Thomas	Jr
DE	54	Quinlan Carroll	So
LB	55	Eric Bowie	Fr
LB	56	Rae Juan Marbley	So
DE	57	Peter Woullard	Fr
DT	65	Braynon Edwards	Fr
DT	77	Tanzel Smart	Jr
DE	87	Ade Aruna	So
LB	90	Robert Kennedy	Fr
DT	91	Eldrick Washington	Jr
DE	92	Daren Williams	So
DT	93	Kenny Welcome	Sr
DT	94	Sean Wilson	So
DT	95	Paul Staudinger	So
DE	97	Trey Cammisa	So
DT	98	Eric Bell	So
DT	99	Calvin Thomas	Jr
S		Darius Black	Fr
S		Eugene Malik	Fr
CB		Jeremie Francis	Fr
CB		Douglas Henry	Fr
CB		Taris Shenall	Fr
CB		Dedrick Shy	Fr
S		Roderic Teamer	Fr
DT		John Washington	Fr
DT		Brian Webb	Fr

Special teams

Pos.	#	Name	Class
K	28	Andrew DiRocco	So
P	31	Peter Picerelli	Sr
K	36	Trevor Simms	Sr
K	59	Brandon Purcell	Jr
P, K	62	Steven Broccoli	Sr
P, K	63	Casey Spinelli	Jr
P, K	69	Aaron Root	So
A	86	Leondre James	Fr
P, K	95	Logan Hilton	Sr
DS	97	Michael Lizanich	Jr
DS	98	Aaron Golub	So
P, K		Zachary Block	Fr

Head coach

- Curtis Johnson (4th season)

Coordinators/assistant coaches

- Eric Price – Offensive coordinator
- Lionel Washington – Co-defensive coordinator/secondary
- Jason Rollins – Co-defensive coordinator/secondary
- Kwahn Drake – Defensive line
- David Johnson – Tight ends/running backs
- Doug Lichtenberger – Linebackers/special teams coordinator
- John McDonell – Offensive line
- Aaron Price – Quarterbacks
- Carter Sheridan – Wide receivers
- Kenny Bourgeois – Graduate assistant, Defense
- Chad Jenkins – Graduate assistant, Defense
- Trey Johnson – Graduate assistant, Offense
- Matt Jones – Graduate assistant, Offense
- Byron Ellis – Director of football operations
- Detrick Belvin – Director of player personnel, defense
- Wayne Cordova – Director of player personnel, offense
- Liz Devlin-Ziegler – Program Manager
- Bradley Mathews – Graduate assistant for Recruiting & Operations
- Lindy Wertz – Director of on-campus recruiting
- Will Woessner – Recruiting Analyst

Legend

- (C) Team captain
- (S) Suspended
- (I) Ineligible
- Injured
- Redshirt

Roster
Last update: April 15, 2015

== Schedule ==
Date	Time	Opponent	Site	TV	Result	Attendance
September 3	8:30 pm	Duke*	Yulman Stadium; New Orleans, LA	CBSSN	L 7–37	25,470
September 12	2:30 pm	at No. 15 Georgia Tech*	Bobby Dodd Stadium; Atlanta, GA	ACCN	L 10–65	50,435
September 19	7:00 pm	Maine*	Yulman Stadium; New Orleans, LA	ESPN3	W 38–7	21,114
October 3	11:00 am	UCF	Yulman Stadium; New Orleans, LA	ESPNews	W 45–31	20,024
October 10	11:00 am	at Temple	Lincoln Financial Field; Philadelphia, PA	ESPNU	L 10–49	35,179
October 16	8:00 pm	No. 24 Houston	Yulman Stadium; New Orleans, LA	ESPNU	L 7–42	21,522
October 24	12:00 pm	at Navy	Navy–Marine Corps Memorial Stadium; Annapolis, MD	CBSSN	L 14–31	32,033
October 31	6:00 pm	at No. 16 Memphis	Liberty Bowl Memorial Stadium; Memphis, TN	CBSSN	L 13–41	30,381
November 7	3:00 pm	UConn^{†}	Yulman Stadium; New Orleans, LA	ESPNews	L 3–7	26,775
November 14	11:00 am	at Army*	Michie Stadium; West Point, NY	CBSSN	W 34–31	31,217
November 21	7:00 pm	at SMU	Gerald J. Ford Stadium; Dallas, TX	ESPNews	L 21–49	14,954
November 27	7:00 pm	Tulsa	Yulman Stadium; New Orleans, LA	ESPNU	L 34–45	22,672
*Non-conference game; ^{†}Homecoming; Rankings from AP Poll released prior to the game; All times are in Central time

== Game summaries ==
=== Duke ===
Week 1: Duke Blue Devils at Tulane Green Wave – Game Summary

Quarter	1	2	3	4	Total
Duke	3	10	3	21	37
Tulane	0	0	0	7	7

at Yulman Stadium • New Orleans, Louisiana

- Date: September 3, 2015
- Game time: 8:30 p.m. CDT
- Game attendance: 25,470
- TV announcers (CBS Sports Network): Rich Waltz, Adam Archuleta, Cassie Gallo

=== Georgia Tech ===
Week 2: Tulane Green Wave at Georgia Tech Yellow Jackets – Game Summary

Quarter	1	2	3	4	Total
Tulane	0	7	0	3	10
Georgia Tech	7	21	16	21	65

at Bobby Dodd Stadium • Atlanta, Georgia

- Date: September 12, 2015
- Game time: 3:30 p.m. EDT
- Game attendance: 50,435
- TV announcers (ACCN): Wes Durham, James Bates, Jenn Hildreth

=== Maine ===
Week 3: Maine Black Bears at Tulane Green Wave – Game Summary

Quarter	1	2	3	4	Total
Maine	7	0	0	0	7
Tulane	3	21	14	0	38

at Yulman Stadium • New Orleans, Louisiana

- Date: September 19, 2015
- Game time: 7:00 p.m. CDT
- Game attendance: 21,114
- TV announcers (ESPN3): Roy Philpott, Vonnie Holiday

=== UCF ===
In this game, Tulane long snapper Aaron Golub became the first legally blind person to play in an NCAA division I game.

Week 5: UCF Knights at Tulane Green Wave – Game Summary

Quarter	1	2	3	4	Total
UCF	7	3	0	21	31
Tulane	7	17	14	7	45

at Yulman Stadium • New Orleans, Louisiana

- Date: October 3, 2015
- Game time: 11:00 a.m. CDT
- Game attendance: 20,024
- TV announcers (ESPNews): Jason Benetti, Brian Kinchen

=== Temple ===
Week 6: Tulane Green Wave at Temple Owls – Game Summary

Quarter	1	2	3	4	Total
Tulane	3	7	0	0	10
Temple	7	14	21	7	49

at Lincoln Financial Field • Philadelphia, Pennsylvania

- Date: October 10, 2015
- Game time: 12:00 p.m. EDT
- Game attendance: 35,179
- TV announcers (ESPNU): Mike Corey, Rene Ingoglia

=== Houston ===
Week 7: Houston Cougars at Tulane Green Wave – Game Summary

Quarter	1	2	3	4	Total
#24 Houston	7	21	14	0	42
Tulane	0	7	0	0	7

at Yulman Stadium • New Orleans, Louisiana

- Date: October 16, 2015
- Game time: 8:00 p.m. CDT
- Game attendance: 21,522
- TV announcers (ESPNU): Shawn Kenney, Brian Kinchen

=== Navy ===
Week 8: Tulane Green Wave at Navy Midshipmen – Game Summary

Quarter	1	2	3	4	Total
Tulane	0	7	0	7	14
Navy	7	3	7	14	31

at Navy–Marine Corps Memorial Stadium • Annapolis, Maryland

- Date: October 24, 2015
- Game time: 1:00 p.m. EDT
- Game attendance: 32,033
- TV announcers (CBSSN): John Sadak, Randy Cross, Sheehan Stanwick Burch

=== Memphis ===
Week 9: Tulane Green Wave at Memphis Tigers – Game Summary

Quarter	1	2	3	4	Total
Tulane	6	7	0	0	13
#16 Memphis	0	15	12	14	41

at Liberty Bowl Memorial Stadium • Memphis, Tennessee

- Date: October 31, 2015
- Game time: 6:00 p.m. CDT
- Game attendance: 30,381
- TV announcers (CBSSN): Dave Ryan, Jay Feely, Lauren Gardner

=== UConn ===
Week 10 (homecoming): UConn Huskies at Tulane Green Wave – Game Summary

Quarter	1	2	3	4	Total
UConn	7	0	0	0	7
Tulane	0	3	0	0	3

at Yulman Stadium • New Orleans, Louisiana

- Date: November 7, 2015
- Game time: 3:00 p.m. CST
- Game weather: Rain
- Game attendance: 26,775
- TV announcers (ESPNews): Mike Corey, Rene Ingoglia

=== Army ===
Week 11: Tulane Green Wave at Army Black Knights – Game Summary

Quarter	1	2	3	4	Total
Tulane	7	21	0	6	34
Army	7	14	0	10	31

at Michie Stadium • West Point, New York

- Date: November 14, 2015
- Game time: 12:00 p.m. EST
- Game attendance: 31,217
- TV announcers (CBSSN): Ben Holden, Jay Feely, John Schriffen

=== SMU ===
Week 12: Tulane Green Wave at SMU Mustangs – Game Summary

Quarter	1	2	3	4	Total
Tulane	0	7	7	7	21
SMU	14	21	0	14	49

at Gerald J. Ford Stadium • Dallas, Texas

- Date: November 21, 2015
- Game time: 7:00 p.m. CST
- Game attendance: 14,954
- TV announcers (ESPNews): Mike Corey, Rene Ingoglia

=== Tulsa ===
Week 13: Tulsa Golden Hurricane at Tulane Green Wave – Game Summary

Quarter	1	2	3	4	Total
Tulsa	7	7	10	21	45
Tulane	7	17	3	7	34

at Yulman Stadium • New Orleans, Louisiana

- Date: November 27, 2015
- Game time: 7:00 p.m. CST
- Game attendance: 22,672
- TV announcers (ESPNU): Roy Philpott, Brian Kinchen

Led by former walk-on and fifth-year senior Jordy Joseph due to an injury to starting Quarterback Tanner Lee, Tulane led Tulsa by 10 points well into the fourth quarter. Joseph then threw two interceptions, both of which were returned for touchdowns. Following the Green Wave's loss, capping a 3–9 season, head coach Curtis Johnson was fired. His final record in four years with the program was 15–34. In Tulane's press release, Athletic Director Rick Dickson was quoted as saying "...the program has not progressed to the level that we aspire to."
