= 2015 Temple Owls football team =

American college football season

2015 Temple Owls football

The American East Division champion

American Athletic Championship Game, L 13–24 vs. Houston

Boca Raton Bowl, L 17–32 vs. Toledo
- Conference: American Athletic Conference
- East Division
- Record: 10–4 (7–1 AAC)
- Head coach: Matt Rhule (3rd season)
- Offensive coordinator: Marcus Satterfield (3rd season)
- Offensive scheme: Spread
- Defensive coordinator: Phil Snow (3rd season)
- Base defense: 4–3
- Home stadium: Lincoln Financial Field

2015 American Athletic Conference football standings
	Conf.			Overall
Team	W		L	W		L
East Division
Temple x	7	–	1	10	–	4
South Florida	6	–	2	8	–	5
Cincinnati	4	–	4	7	–	6
UConn	4	–	4	6	–	7
East Carolina	3	–	5	5	–	7
UCF	0	–	8	0	–	12
West Division
No. 8 Houston xy$	7	–	1	13	–	1
No. 18 Navy x	7	–	1	11	–	2
Memphis	5	–	3	9	–	4
Tulsa	3	–	5	6	–	7
Tulane	1	–	7	3	–	9
SMU	1	–	7	2	–	10
Championship: Houston 24, Temple 13
$ – Conference champion; x – Division champion/co-champions; y – Championship game participant; As of December 31, 2015; Rankings from AP Poll

The 2015 Temple Owls football team represented Temple University in the 2015 NCAA Division I FBS football season. The Owls were led by third-year head coach Matt Rhule and played their home games at Lincoln Financial Field. They were members of the East Division of the American Athletic Conference. They finished the season 10–4, 7–1 in American Athletic play to finish as champions of the East Division. They represented the East Division in the American Athletic Championship Game where they lost to Houston. They were invited to the Boca Raton Bowl where they lost to Toledo.

The season was highlighted by the first win against Penn State since 1941, their first ever 7–0 start, and their first AP Poll and Coaches Poll ranking since 1979, and is widely considered the greatest season in program history.

== Schedule ==
Date	Time	Opponent	Rank	Site	TV	Result	Attendance
September 5	3:30 p.m.	Penn State*		Lincoln Financial Field; Philadelphia, PA	ESPN	W 27–10	69,176
September 12	8:00 p.m.	at Cincinnati		Nippert Stadium; Cincinnati, OH	ESPNews	W 34–26	38,112
September 19	3:00 p.m.	at UMass*		Gillette Stadium; Foxborough, MA	ESPN3	W 25–23	10,141
October 2	7:00 p.m.	at Charlotte*		Jerry Richardson Stadium; Charlotte, NC	CBSSN	W 37–3	13,105
October 10	12:00 p.m.	Tulane^{†}		Lincoln Financial Field; Philadelphia, PA	ESPNU	W 49–10	35,179
October 17	7:30 p.m.	UCF		Lincoln Financial Field; Philadelphia, PA	CBSSN	W 30–16	31,372
October 22	7:00 p.m.	at East Carolina	No. 22	Dowdy–Ficklen Stadium; Greenville, NC	ESPN2	W 24–14	39,417
October 31	8:00 p.m.	No. 9 Notre Dame*	No. 21	Lincoln Financial Field; Philadelphia, PA (College GameDay)	ABC	L 20–24	69,280
November 6	8:00 p.m.	at SMU	No. 22	Gerald J. Ford Stadium; Dallas, TX	ESPN2	W 60–40	17,232
November 14	7:00 p.m.	at South Florida	No. 22	Raymond James Stadium; Tampa, FL	CBSSN	L 23–44	28,393
November 21	12:00 p.m.	No. 21 Memphis		Lincoln Financial Field; Philadelphia, PA	ESPNU	W 31–12	31,708
November 28	7:00 p.m.	UConn	No. 25	Lincoln Financial Field; Philadelphia, PA	ESPNU	W 27–3	28,236
December 5	12:00 p.m.	at No. 19 Houston	No. 22	TDECU Stadium; Houston, TX (American Athletic Conference Championship Game)	ABC	L 13–24	35,721
December 22	7:00 p.m.	vs. Toledo*	No. 24	FAU Stadium; Boca Raton, FL (Boca Raton Bowl)	ESPN	L 17–32	25,908
*Non-conference game; ^{†}Homecoming; Rankings from AP Poll and CFP Rankings after November 3 released prior to game; All times are in Eastern time

== Game summaries ==
=== Penn State ===
	1	2	3	4	Total
Nittany Lions	10	0	0	0	10
Owls	0	7	10	10	27

This was the Owls' first victory over Penn State since 1941. The announced crowd at Lincoln Financial Field was 69,176 Saturday, a record for a Temple home game. After the Nittany Lions scored 10 points in the first quarter, Temple responded with 27 unanswered points. Penn State quarterback Christian Hackenberg was sacked 10 times, with Temple linebacker Tyler Matakevich recording three sacks. This game was Temple's first victory over a Big Ten team since a 1990 victory over the Wisconsin Badgers, as the Owls snapped a 31-game losing streak in the series to the Nittany Lions.

=== At Cincinnati ===
	1	2	3	4	Total
Owls	3	7	21	3	34
Bearcats	0	6	6	14	26

This was the Owls' first victory over Cincinnati since 1985.

=== At UMass ===
	1	2	3	4	Total
Owls	7	10	3	5	25
Minutemen	0	17	0	6	23

=== At Charlotte ===
	1	2	3	4	Total
Owls	3	7	20	7	37
49ers	0	3	0	0	3

=== Tulane ===
	1	2	3	4	Total
Green Wave	3	7	0	0	10
Owls	7	14	21	7	49

=== UCF ===
	1	2	3	4	Total
Knights	3	10	3	0	16
Owls	7	7	0	16	30

=== At East Carolina ===
	1	2	3	4	Total
#22 Owls	3	7	0	14	24
Pirates	0	14	0	0	14

This was the first game, and win, for a nationally ranked Owls team since 1979.

=== Notre Dame ===
	1	2	3	4	Total
#9 Fighting Irish	7	7	3	7	24
#21 Owls	7	3	0	10	20

This was the first time ESPN's College GameDay visited a Temple home game. Set up at Independence Mall, the broadcast attracted more than 10,000 fans.

=== At SMU ===
	1	2	3	4	Total
#23 Owls	14	7	17	22	60
Mustangs	0	17	7	16	40

=== At South Florida ===
	1	2	3	4	Total
#21 Owls	7	3	10	3	23
Bulls	7	24	3	10	44

=== Memphis ===
	1	2	3	4	Total
Tigers	3	6	3	0	12
Owls	0	14	0	17	31

=== UConn ===
	1	2	3	4	Total
Huskies	0	0	0	3	3
#25 Owls	7	3	10	7	27

This win sealed the Owls' berth in the inaugural AAC Championship, their second division title in team history.

=== The American Championship vs. Houston ===
	1	2	3	4	Total
#20 Owls	0	3	7	3	13
#17 Cougars	7	10	7	0	24

=== Boca Raton Bowl vs. Toledo ===
	1	2	3	4	Total
#24 Owls	3	0	6	8	17
Rockets	0	12	0	20	32

== Awards and honors ==
=== National awards ===
- Defense

Tyler Matakevich - LB - Senior

- Chuck Bednarik Award - Winner
- Bronko Nagurski Trophy - Winner
- Lott IMPACT Trophy - Finalist
- Lombardi Award - Semi-Finalist

=== All Americans ===
- Consensus All-American

Tyler Matakevich - LB - Senior

- Phil Steele All American Team

Dion Dawkins - OL - Junior - 4th Team

=== Conference awards ===
- Defense

Tyler Matakevich - LB - Senior

- American Athletic Conference Defensive Player of the Year - Winner

==== American Athletic Conference All-Conference Team ====
- First Team

Kyle Friend, C
Matt Ioannidis, DL
Eric Lofton, OL
Tyler Matakevich, LB
Nate D. Smith, DL
Jahad Thomas, RB
Alex Wells, FS

- Second Team

Dion Dawkins, OL
Sean Chandler, DB

- Other notable NFL players

Haason Reddick, DL
P. J. Walker, QB

== Rankings ==
Ranking movements Legend: ██ Increase in ranking ██ Decrease in ranking — = Not ranked RV = Received votes
	Week															
Poll	Pre	1	2	3	4	5	6	7	8	9	10	11	12	13	14	Final
AP	—	RV	RV	RV	RV	RV	RV	22	21	23	21	RV	25	20	24	RV
Coaches	—	RV	RV	RV	RV	RV	RV	24	22	23	21	RV	24	21	24	RV
CFP	Not released									22	22	—	25	22	24	Not released

== NFL Players ==
=== NFL Draft Combine ===
Three Temple players were invited to participate in the 2016 NFL Scouting Combine.

#	Name	POS	HT	WT	Arms	Hands	40	Bench Press	Vert Jump	Broad Jump	3 Cone Drill	20-yd Shuttle	Ref
#1	Tavon Young	CB	5-9	183 lbs	30 5/8	9 1/8	4.46	9	34.5 in	118 in	6.80	3.93	
#8	Tyler Matakevich	LB	6-0	238 lbs	31 1/4	9 1/2	4.81	22	31.0 in	112 in	7.19	4.50	
#9	Matt Ioannidis	DL	6-3	299 lbs			5.03	32	28.0 in	108.0 in	7.78	4.71	

† Top performer

=== 2016 NFL draft ===
Following the season, the following members of the Temple football team were selected in the 2016 NFL draft.

#	Player	Round	Pick	Position	NFL Club
#1	Tavon Young	4	104	CB	Baltimore Ravens
#9	Matt Ioannidis	5	152	DL	Washington Redskins
#8	Tyler Matakevich	7	246	LB	Pittsburgh Steelers

=== Undrafted Free Agents ===
In addition to the draft selections above, the following Temple players signed NFL contracts after the draft.

#	Name	POS	HT	WT	NFL Club	Ref
#17	Brandon Shippen	WR	5-11	191 lbs	Dolphins	
#19	Robby Anderson	WR	6-3	190 lbs	Jets	
#75	Shahbaz Ahmed	OL	6-3	285 lbs	Falcons	
#79	Kyle Friend	OL	6-2	305 lbs	Jets	
