= 2015 East Carolina Pirates football team =

American college football season

2015 East Carolina Pirates football
- Conference: American Athletic Conference
- East Division
- Record: 5–7 (3–5 AAC)
- Head coach: Ruffin McNeill (6th season)
- Offensive coordinator: Dave Nichol (1st season)
- Offensive scheme: Air raid
- Defensive coordinator: Rick Smith (3rd season)
- Base defense: 4–3
- Home stadium: Dowdy–Ficklen Stadium

2015 American Athletic Conference football standings
	Conf.			Overall
Team	W		L	W		L
East Division
Temple x	7	–	1	10	–	4
South Florida	6	–	2	8	–	5
Cincinnati	4	–	4	7	–	6
UConn	4	–	4	6	–	7
East Carolina	3	–	5	5	–	7
UCF	0	–	8	0	–	12
West Division
No. 8 Houston xy$	7	–	1	13	–	1
No. 18 Navy x	7	–	1	11	–	2
Memphis	5	–	3	9	–	4
Tulsa	3	–	5	6	–	7
Tulane	1	–	7	3	–	9
SMU	1	–	7	2	–	10
Championship: Houston 24, Temple 13
$ – Conference champion; x – Division champion/co-champions; y – Championship game participant; As of December 31, 2015; Rankings from AP Poll

The 2015 East Carolina Pirates football team represented East Carolina University in the 2015 NCAA Division I FBS football season. They were led by sixth-year head coach Ruffin McNeill and played their home games at Dowdy–Ficklen Stadium, Greenville. This was East Carolina's second season as members of the Eastern Division of the American Athletic Conference. They finished the season 5–7, 3–5 in AAC play to finish in fifth place in the East Division.

McNeill was fired at the end of the season. He finished with a six-year record of 42–24.

== Schedule ==
Date	Time	Opponent	Site	TV	Result	Attendance
September 5	6:00 p.m.	Towson*	Dowdy–Ficklen Stadium; Greenville, NC	ESPN3	W 28–20	40,712
September 12	7:00 p.m.	at Florida*	Ben Hill Griffin Stadium; Gainesville, FL	ESPN2	L 24–31	88,034
September 19	3:30 p.m.	at Navy	Navy–Marine Corps Memorial Stadium; Annapolis, MD	CBSSN	L 21–45	34,717
September 26	3:30 p.m.	Virginia Tech*	Dowdy–Ficklen Stadium; Greenville, NC	ABC/ESPN2	W 35–28	50,514
October 3	4:00 p.m.	at SMU	Gerald J. Ford Stadium; University Park, TX	ESPNews	W 49–23	17,136
October 10	7:30 p.m.	at BYU*	LaVell Edwards Stadium; Provo, UT	ESPNU	L 38–45	60,186
October 17	Noon	Tulsa^{†}	Dowdy–Ficklen Stadium; Greenville, NC	ESPNews	W 30–17	43,065
October 22	7:00 p.m.	No. 22 Temple	Dowdy–Ficklen Stadium; Greenville, NC	ESPN2	L 14–24	39,417
October 30	7:00 p.m.	at UConn	Rentschler Field; East Hartford, CT	ESPNU	L 13–31	23,116
November 7	7:30 p.m.	South Florida	Dowdy–Ficklen Stadium; Greenville, NC	CBSSN	L 17–22	45,194
November 19	7:00 p.m.	at UCF	Bright House Networks Stadium; Orlando, FL	ESPN	W 44–7	23,734
November 28	Noon	Cincinnati	Dowdy–Ficklen Stadium; Greenville, NC	CBSSN	L 16–19	40,743
*Non-conference game; ^{†}Homecoming; Rankings from AP Poll released prior to the game; All times are in Eastern time

Schedule source:

== Game summaries ==
=== Towson ===
	1	2	3	4	Total
Tigers	7	3	3	7	20
Pirates	14	0	7	7	28

=== At Florida ===
	1	2	3	4	Total
Pirates	7	0	7	10	24
Gators	10	0	14	7	31

=== At Navy ===
	1	2	3	4	Total
Pirates	7	7	0	7	21
Midshipmen	7	21	0	17	45

=== Virginia Tech ===
	1	2	3	4	Total
Hokies	14	0	7	7	28
Pirates	14	7	14	0	35

=== At SMU ===
	1	2	3	4	Total
Pirates	7	14	14	14	49
Mustangs	13	10	0	0	23

=== At BYU ===
	1	2	3	4	Total
Pirates	14	7	0	17	38
Cougars	7	21	14	3	45

=== Tulsa ===
	1	2	3	4	Total
Pirates	7	13	3	7	30
Golden Hurricane	0	0	0	17	17

=== Temple ===
	1	2	3	4	Total
Owls	3	7	0	14	24
Pirates	0	14	0	0	14

=== At UConn ===
	1	2	3	4	Total
Pirates	6	0	0	7	13
Huskies	3	7	14	7	31

=== South Florida ===
	1	2	3	4	Total
Bulls	2	10	0	10	22
Pirates	0	7	7	3	17

=== At UCF ===
	1	2	3	4	Total
Pirates	14	17	13	0	44
Knights	7	0	0	0	7

=== Cincinnati ===
	1	2	3	4	Total
Bearcats	0	6	10	3	19
Pirates	10	0	0	6	16

== Roster ==
2015 East Carolina Pirates football team roster
Players
Coaches
Offense

Pos.	#	Name	Class
WR	1	Deondre Farrier	Fr
RB	3	Anthony Scott	So
WR	4	Malik Gray	Fr
QB	4	Ray Smith	Fr
QB	6	Kurt Benkert	So
WR	7	Isaiah Jones	Jr
WR	8	Cedric Thompson	Sr
QB	9	Philip Nelson	Jr
QB	10	Blake Kemp	Jr
QB	11	James Summers	Jr
QB	12	Cody Keith	Jr
WR	13	Justin Strozier	Fr
QB	14	John Jacobs	Fr
WR	15	Brandon Bishop	Jr
WR	19	Curtis Burston	Fr
QB	19	Jason Connella	Fr
RB	22	Chris Hairston	Sr
WR	23	Quay Johnson	So
RB	24	Derrell Scott	So
RB	25	Devin Anderson	Fr
WR	26	Tyrell Thompson	Fr
RB	27	Marquez Grayson	So
RB	33	Shawn Furlow	Fr
WR	49	Brian Hardy	Jr
OL	50	C.J. Struyk	Sr
OL	55	Garrett McGhin	Fr
OL	62	Brandon Smith	So
OL	63	Darius Anderson	Fr
OL	64	Des Barmore	Fr
OL	65	J.T. Boyd	Jr
OL	66	Erik Lenzen	Fr
OL	68	Tre Robertson	Sr
OL	69	Ike Harris	Sr
OL	70	Kyle Erickson	Fr
OL	71	Dontae Levingston	Sr
OL	72	Quincy McKinney	Sr
OL	73	Christian Matau	So
OL	74	Justin Sandifer	Jr
OL	75	Bladen Gatling	Jr
OL	76	Stewart Hinson	Sr
OL	77	Jared Huneycutt	Fr
OL	78	Messiah Rice	Fr
OL	79	Dalton Montgomery	Fr
TE	80	Bryce Williams	Sr
WR	81	Jimmy Williams	Jr
WR	82	DaQuan Barnes	Jr
TE	83	Beau Huffman	Fr
WR	84	Jonathan Stanley	So
WR	85	Davon Grayson	Jr
TE	86	Stephen Baggett	So
WR	87	Terrell Green	So
WR	88	Trevon Brown	So
TE	93	Luke Ward	Fr

Defense

Pos.	#	Name	Class
OLB	1	Dayon Pratt	Jr
DB	2	Xavier Smith	So
DB	3	Travon Simmons	So
MLB	4	Darius Wright	Jr
DB	5	Corey Seargent	Fr
DB	6	DaShawn Benton	Jr
MLB	7	Jordan Williams	So
DB	8	Bobby Fulp	So
DB	9	Nhyre Quinerly	Fr
DB	10	Rocco Scarfone	Sr
DB	12	Cody Purdie	So
OLB	13	Pat Green	So
DB	14	Travis Phillips	So
DB	14	Devon Sutton	Fr
DB	15	Chris Love	So
DB	17	Blake Norwood	Fr
DB	20	Austin Teague	So
MLB	21	Ray Tillman	So
DB	22	Terrell Richardson	Jr
OLB	24	C.J. Maybin	Fr
DB	28	Josh Hawkins	Sr
MLB	30	Joe Carter	So
DB	31	Domonique Lennon	Sr
DB	32	Marquel King	Fr
DB	33	Drew Turnage	Fr
MLB	34	Devaris Brunson	Jr
DB	37	Trevian Hicks	So
DB	39	DaShaun Amos	Jr
MLB	41	Tony Baird	Fr
MLB	43	Drayvon Fairley	Jr
MLB	44	Zeek Bigger	Sr
OLB	46	Yiannis Bowden	Fr
OLB	47	Jeton Beavers	Sr
DL	50	Shaun James	Fr
OLB	51	Montese Overton	Sr
DL	52	Kirk Donaldson	So
MLB	53	Cole Pickard	Fr
DL	54	Anthony Orr	Jr
MLB	55	Cam White	Jr
DL	56	Demetri McGill	Jr
OLB	57	Joe Allely	So
DL	58	Darius Commissiong	Jr
OLB	59	Reece Speight	Jr
DL	66	Terrell Stanley	Sr
DL	69	Justin Brown	Fr
OLB	90	Randall Anderson	So
DL	92	Mike Myers	So
DL	94	Johnathon White	Sr
DL	95	Bennett Boateng	Fr
DL	96	Kiante Anderson	Jr
DL	97	Demage Bailey	So
DL	99	Fred Presley	Jr

Special teams

Pos.	#	Name	Class
PK	30	Connor Torruella	Jr
P	37	Jim Squatriglia	Fr
PK	38	Davis Plowman	Jr
P	40	Worth Gregory	Jr
LS	60	Jamie Land	Fr
LS	61	Colton Oliver	So
PK	91	Caleb Pratt	Fr
PK	98	Tucker Smith	Fr
PK		Eric Kristensen	So

Head coach

- Ruffin McNeill

Coordinators/assistant coaches

- Brad Davis – Run Game Coordinator/Offensive Line
- Kirk Doll – Special Teams Coordinator/Running Backs Coach
- Donnie Kirkpatrick – Asst. Head Coach/Recruiting Coord./Inside Receivers
- Dave Nichol – Offensive Coordinator/Quarterbacks
- Duane Price – Outside Linebackers
- Garrett Riley – Outside Receivers
- Rick Smith – Defensive Coordinator/Secondary
- John Wiley – Associate Head Coach/Inside Linebackers
- Marc Yellock – Defensive Line
- Brandon Butcher – Defensive Staff Assistant
- Kyle Chase – Defensive Staff Assistant
- Bobby Harward – Offensive Staff Assistant
- Mack Helms – Offensive Staff Assistant
- David Mackie – Special Teams Assistant
- Jeff Connors – Assistant AD/Strength and Conditioning
- Alex Folken – Assistant Director of Operations/Personnel
- Ann Hoggard – Administrative Assistant/Ruffin McNeill
- Kelly Neel – Administrative Assistant/Offense
- Brian Overton – Director of Football Operations/Player Personnel
- Harold Robinson – Director of High School Relations
- Brittany Smith – Administrative Assistant/Recruiting
- Dale Steele – Director of Football Administration

Legend

- (C) Team captain
- (S) Suspended
- (I) Ineligible
- Injured
- Redshirt

Roster
