= 2015 American Athletic Conference Football Championship Game =

- Conference Championship
- Logo of the Championship Game
Temple Owls	Houston Cougars
(10–2)	(11–1)
13	24
Head coach: Matt Rhule	Head coach: Tom Herman
AP / Coaches / CFP; 20 / 21 / 22	AP / Coaches / CFP; 17 / 18 / 19
	1	2	3	4	Total
Temple	0	3	7	3	13
Houston	7	10	7	0	24
- Date: December 5, 2015
- Season: 2015
- Stadium: TDECU Stadium
- Location: Houston, TX
- MVP: Greg Ward Jr. (QB, Houston)
- Favorite: Houston by 5.5
- Referee: Michael Roche
- Attendance: 35,721

United States TV coverage
- Network: ABC/IMG
- Announcers: Sean McDonough, Chris Spielman, and Todd McShay (ABC); Tony Castricone and Tony Pike (IMG)

2015 American Athletic Conference football standings
	Conf.			Overall
Team	W		L	W		L
East Division
Temple x	7	–	1	10	–	4
South Florida	6	–	2	8	–	5
Cincinnati	4	–	4	7	–	6
UConn	4	–	4	6	–	7
East Carolina	3	–	5	5	–	7
UCF	0	–	8	0	–	12
West Division
No. 8 Houston xy$	7	–	1	13	–	1
No. 18 Navy x	7	–	1	11	–	2
Memphis	5	–	3	9	–	4
Tulsa	3	–	5	6	–	7
Tulane	1	–	7	3	–	9
SMU	1	–	7	2	–	10
Championship: Houston 24, Temple 13
$ – Conference champion; x – Division champion/co-champions; y – Championship game participant; As of December 31, 2015; Rankings from AP Poll

The 2015 American Athletic Conference Football Championship Game was held on December 5, 2015, at 11:00 a.m. Central Time at TDECU Stadium in Houston, Texas. The first football championship game for The American, it was hosted by the Houston Cougars, West Division champion, and featured the Temple Owls, East Division champion. It was broadcast on ABC.

== Teams ==
=== Houston ===
The Houston Cougars football team is a member of the American Athletic Conference in its West Division. They finished the season 13–1, 7–1 in American Athletic play to win a share of the West Division title. Due to their head to head win over Navy, they represented the West Division in the inaugural American Athletic Championship Game. This was their first conference championship game since 2011, when they were Conference USA. They were aiming for their first conference championship since 2006.

=== Temple ===
The Temple Owls were members of the East Division of the American Athletic Conference. They finished the season 10–4, 7–1 in American Athletic Conference play to finish as champions of the East Division. This was their first division title since 2009, when they tied with Ohio for the MAC West title. They represented the East Division in the American Athletic Championship Game. The Owls were aiming for their first conference title since winning the Middle Atlantic Conference in 1967 and their first major conference title in school history.

== Game summary ==
Scoring summary

Quarter	Time	Drive			Team	Scoring information	Score	
Quarter	Time	Plays	Yards	TOP	Team	Scoring information	Temple	Houston
1	10:05	10	36	2:55	Houston	Javin Webb 1-yard run (Ty Cummings kick)	0	7
2	13:28	9	42	2:59	Houston	Ty Cummings 24-yard field goal	0	10
2	5:32	5	71	1:59	Houston	Greg Ward Jr. 47-yard run (Ty Cummings kick)	0	17
2	1:46	9	51	3:46	Temple	Austin Jones 40-yard field goal	3	17
3	6:40	7	71	3:38	Houston	Greg Ward Jr. 10-yard run (Ty Cummings kick)	3	24
3	2:26	10	75	4:14	Temple	Robby Anderson 13-yard pass from P. J. Walker (Austin Jones kick)	10	24
4	11:29	10	29	4:47	Temple	Austin Jones 39-yard field goal	13	24
"TOP" = time of possession. For other American football terms, see Glossary of American football.							13	24

=== Statistics ===
Statistics	Houston	Temple
First downs	16	19
Total offense	339	385
Rushing yards–TD	233–3	98–0
Passing yards–TD	106–0	287–1
Passing: Comp–Att–Int	12–22–0	26–44–1
Fumbles: Number–Lost	0–0	1–1
Penalties: Number–Yards	5–40	2–15
Punts: Average Yardage	36.5	33
Kickoffs: Average Yardage	63	59
Sacks: Number–Yards	1–4	0–0
Field Goals: Good–Att	1–1	2–2
Points off turnovers	7	0
Time of Possession	26:01	32:58
