= 2015 Memphis Tigers football team =

American college football season

2015 Memphis Tigers football

Birmingham Bowl, L 10–31 vs. Auburn
- Conference: American Athletic Conference
- West Division
- Record: 9–4 (5–3 The American)
- Head coach: Justin Fuente (4th season; regular season); Darrell Dickey (interim; bowl game)
- Offensive coordinator: Darrell Dickey (4th season)
- Co-offensive coordinator: Brad Cornelsen (1st season)
- Offensive scheme: Pro-style
- Defensive coordinator: Galen Scott (1st season)
- Base defense: 4–3
- Home stadium: Liberty Bowl Memorial Stadium

2015 American Athletic Conference football standings
	Conf.			Overall
Team	W		L	W		L
East Division
Temple x	7	–	1	10	–	4
South Florida	6	–	2	8	–	5
Cincinnati	4	–	4	7	–	6
UConn	4	–	4	6	–	7
East Carolina	3	–	5	5	–	7
UCF	0	–	8	0	–	12
West Division
No. 8 Houston xy$	7	–	1	13	–	1
No. 18 Navy x	7	–	1	11	–	2
Memphis	5	–	3	9	–	4
Tulsa	3	–	5	6	–	7
Tulane	1	–	7	3	–	9
SMU	1	–	7	2	–	10
Championship: Houston 24, Temple 13
$ – Conference champion; x – Division champion/co-champions; y – Championship game participant; As of December 31, 2015; Rankings from AP Poll

The 2015 Memphis Tigers football team represented the University of Memphis in the 2015 NCAA Division I FBS football season. The Tigers were led by fourth-year head coach Justin Fuente and played their home games at the Liberty Bowl Memorial Stadium in Memphis, Tennessee. The Tigers competed as a member of the West Division of the American Athletic Conference. They finished the season 9–4, 5–3 in American Athletic play to finish in third place in the West Division. They were invited to the Birmingham Bowl where they lost to Auburn.

On October 17, the Tigers defeated Ole Miss which led them to a #18 ranking in polls after the Tigers began the season with an 8–0 record. Before they were defeated by Navy three weeks later, the Tigers were ranked as high as #13 in the polls, which was the highest ever ranking for the program in school history.

On November 29, head coach Justin Fuente resigned to become the head coach at Virginia Tech. He finished at Memphis with a four-year record of 26–23. The Tigers were led by interim head coach Darrell Dickey in the Birmingham Bowl.

== Schedule ==
Date	Time	Opponent	Rank	Site	TV	Result	Attendance
September 5	6:00 p.m.	Missouri State*		Liberty Bowl Memorial Stadium; Memphis, TN	ESPN3	W 63–7	41,730
September 12	6:00 p.m.	at Kansas*		Memorial Stadium; Lawrence, KS	JTV/ESPN3	W 55–23	37,798
September 19	2:00 p.m.	at Bowling Green*		Doyt Perry Stadium; Bowling Green, OH	ASN	W 44–41	21,178
September 24	6:30 p.m.	Cincinnati		Liberty Bowl Memorial Stadium; Memphis, TN	ESPN	W 53–46	45,172
October 2	6:00 p.m.	at South Florida		Raymond James Stadium; Tampa, FL	ESPN2	W 24–17	22,546
October 17	11:00 a.m.	No. 13 Ole Miss*		Liberty Bowl Memorial Stadium; Memphis, TN (rivalry)	ABC/ESPN2	W 37–24	60,241
October 23	7:00 p.m.	at Tulsa	No. 18	Chapman Stadium; Tulsa, OK	ESPN	W 66–42	20,216
October 31	6:00 p.m.	Tulane	No. 16	Liberty Bowl Memorial Stadium; Memphis, TN	CBSSN	W 41–13	30,381
November 7	6:00 p.m.	Navy^{†}	No. 13	Liberty Bowl Memorial Stadium; Memphis, TN	ESPN2	L 20–45	55,212
November 14	6:00 p.m.	at No. 24 Houston	No. 21	TDECU Stadium; Houston, TX	ESPN2	L 34–35	42,159
November 21	11:00 a.m.	at Temple	No. 21	Lincoln Financial Field; Philadelphia, PA	ESPNU	L 12–31	31,708
November 28	11:00 a.m.	SMU		Liberty Bowl Memorial Stadium; Memphis, TN	ESPNews	W 63–0	30,075
December 30	11:00 a.m.	vs. Auburn*		Legion Field; Birmingham, AL (Birmingham Bowl)	ESPN	L 10–31	59,430
*Non-conference game; ^{†}Homecoming; Rankings from AP Poll and CFP Rankings after November 3 released prior to game; All times are in Central time

== Rankings ==
Ranking movements Legend: ██ Increase in ranking ██ Decrease in ranking — = Not ranked RV = Received votes
	Week															
Poll	Pre	1	2	3	4	5	6	7	8	9	10	11	12	13	14	Final
AP	—	—	—	RV	RV	RV	RV	18	16	15	25	RV	—	RV	RV	—
Coaches	—	RV	RV	RV	RV	25	22	17	16	16	25	RV	—	RV	RV	RV
CFP	Not released									13	21	21	—	—	—	Not released

== Game summaries ==
=== Missouri State ===
	1	2	3	4	Total
Bears	0	0	7	0	7
Tigers	28	14	14	7	63

=== At Kansas ===
	1	2	3	4	Total
Tigers	10	14	24	7	55
Jayhawks	10	3	7	3	23

=== Bowling Green ===
	1	2	3	4	Total
Tigers	10	7	17	10	44
Falcons	14	13	7	7	41

=== Cincinnati ===
	1	2	3	4	Total
Bearcats	10	20	3	13	46
Tigers	14	14	3	22	53

=== At South Florida ===
	1	2	3	4	Total
Tigers	0	7	10	7	24
Bulls	7	3	0	7	17

=== Ole Miss ===
	1	2	3	4	Total
#13 Rebels	14	0	10	0	24
Tigers	7	17	7	6	37

=== At Tulsa ===
	1	2	3	4	Total
#18 Tigers	14	21	17	14	66
Golden Hurricane	7	14	14	7	42

=== Tulane ===
	1	2	3	4	Total
Green Wave	6	7	0	0	13
#16 Tigers	0	15	12	14	41

=== Navy ===
	1	2	3	4	Total
Midshipmen	7	10	14	14	45
#15 Tigers	10	0	10	0	20

=== At Houston ===
	1	2	3	4	Total
#25 Tigers	3	17	7	7	34
#16 Cougars	0	7	7	21	35

=== At Temple ===
	1	2	3	4	Total
Tigers	3	6	3	0	12
Owls	0	14	0	17	31

=== SMU ===
	1	2	3	4	Total
Mustangs	0	0	0	0	0
Tigers	28	28	7	0	63

=== Vs. Auburn–Birmingham Bowl ===
	1	2	3	4	Total
Auburn Tigers	10	0	7	14	31
Memphis Tigers	0	10	0	0	10

== Roster ==
2015 Memphis Tigers football team roster
Players
Coaches
Offense

Pos.	#	Name	Class
WR	3	Anthony Miller	RSo
RB	4	Robert Davis	RSo
WR	5	Mose Frazier	RSr
QB	7	Brady Davis	Fr
QB	10	Clay Holgorsen	RFr
RB	11	Sam Craft	Jr
QB	12	Paxton Lynch	RJr
WR	13	Kedarian Jones	Fr
QB	13	Alex Smith	Fr
QB	15	Jason Stewart	Sr
WR	18	Roderick Proctor	So
WR	19	Jae'Lon Oglesby	Fr
WR	22	Tony Pollard	Fr
RB	24	Tearris Wallace	RSo
RB	25	Jarvis Cooper	So
RB	26	Jamarius Henderson	Fr
RB	28	Doroland Dorceus	RSo
WR	32	LeKeron Garcia	RFr
RB	34	Darius Lee	RSr
WR	35	Frank Wims	RJr
TE	40	Alan Cross	RSr
WR	41	Isaiah Farris	RSr
WR	44	Malik Thomas	RFr
TE	45	Nick Raby	Fr
WR	46	Vincent Wilkerson	RFr
WR	47	Devonte Howard	RFr
OL	51	Jace Neville	RFr
OL	54	Drew Kyser	Fr
OL	57	Alexander Karr	RSo
OL	59	Brytain Peddy	Fr
OL	60	Cooper Williams	RFr
OL	61	Christos Aloizos	RJr
OL	63	Tyler Uselton	Sr
OL	64	Zach Collins	RSo
OL	65	Christopher Roberson	RJr
OL	66	Tony Mays II	Jr
OL	67	Jordan Pagan	Jr
OL	70	Micah Simmons	Sr
OL	71	Gabe Kuhn	RSo
OL	72	Trevon Tate	RFr
OL	73	Keenen Davis	Fr
OL	74	Ryan Mack	Sr
OL	75	Michael Stannard	RJr
OL	77	Taylor Fallin	RSr
OL	78	Nick Thomas	RFr
TE	80	Daniel Montiel	RJr
WR	81	Mechane Slade	Fr
TE	82	Scottie Dill	Fr
WR	83	Daniel Hurd	RJr
TE	84	Robby Young	RSo
WR	85	Greg McKillion	Jr
TE	86	Joey Magnifico	Fr
WR	87	Tevin Jones	RSr
WR	88	Drew Bishop	RJr
WR	89	Phil Mayhue	So
RB		Joseph Stevenson	Fr

Defense

Pos.	#	Name	Class
DB	2	Ty Northern	RJr
LB	6	Genard Avery	So
LB	7	Curtis Akins	RFr
DB	8	Arthur Maulet	Jr
DB	9	Jamil Collins	RSo
DB	10	Dontrell Nelson	Jr
DB	12	Chauncey Lanier	RJr
DE	13	DeMarco Montgomery	Jr
DE	14	Latarius Brady	RJr
DE	15	Christian Johnson	RSo
LB	16	Wynton McManis	Sr
DB	17	Chris Morley	RJr
DB	21	Kam Prewitt	Fr
DB	23	B.J. Ross	Jr
DB	25	Austin Hall	Fr
DB	27	Dion Witty	Sr
LB	29	Darian Porter	So
LB	30	Hayden Ferrari	Fr
LB	30	Shareef White	So
DB	31	Anthony Young	RSo
DB	32	DaShaughn Terry	Jr
DB	33	Phillip Sumpter	RSo
LB	34	Jackson Dillon	Jr
LB	36	Reed Rickenbach	Fr
DB	37	Eric Abernathy	RFr
DB	38	Tyler Charrette	Jr
DB	39	Reggis Ball	RSr
DB	42	Shaun Rupert	So
DB	43	Deandre Jordan	So
LB	44	Steven Enis	Fr
LB	45	Noah Robinson	So
DL	48	Ernest Suttles	RSo
LB	49	Joseph Prevost	Fr
LB	50	Lenard Harden	Jr
DE	51	Austin Scott	RJr
LB	53	Leonard Pegues	Sr
LB	56	Ross Burcham	Fr
DL	58	Donald Pennington	RJr
DL	91	Ricky Hunter	RSr
DE	92	Peyton Jones	Fr
DL	93	Cortez Crosby	RSo
DE	94	Isadore Outing	RFr
DL	95	Michael Edwards	Jr
DE	96	Khalil Johnson	Fr
DL	97	Emmanuel Cooper	Fr
DL	98	Jared Gentry	Fr
DB		Tyson Terrell	Fr

Special teams

Pos.	#	Name	Class
P	35	Evan Michael	RSo
P	36	Spencer Smith	RSo
LS	41	Trevor Morgan	Jr
PK	46	Jake Elliott	Jr
P	47	Nick Jacobs	So
LS	52	Tim Belles	Fr
PK	90	Thomas O'Dowd	Fr

Head coach

- Justin Fuente

Coordinators/assistant coaches

- Darrell Dickey – Assistant Head Coach, Co-Offensive Coordinator, Running Backs
- Galen Scott – Defensive Coordinator, Linebackers
- Brad Cornelsen – Co-Offensive Coordinator/ Quarterbacks
- James Shibest – Special Teams Coordinator/Tight Ends
- Brent Guy – Safeties
- Ricky Hunley – Defensive Line
- Troy Reffett – Cornerbacks
- Vance Vice – Offensive Line
- Holmon Wiggins – Wide Receivers
- Jeff Kupper – Football Operations
- Adam Lechtenberg – Player Personnel
- Rohrk Cutchlow – Director Athletic Performance
- Dwayne Chandler – Associate Director, Football
- Corey Smith – Assistant Director, Football
- Darrell Turner – Head Athletic Trainer
- Larry Reynolds – Assistant Athletic Trainer
- Marcus Bell – Director of HS Relations
- Josh Bost – Video Coordinator
- Marc Hohorst – Equipment Manager
- Michael Bangtson – Offensive Graduate Assistant
- Cason Bicknell – Defensive Intern
- Jack Nuismer – Offensive/Special Teams Intern
- Rod Ojong – Defensive Graduate Assistant
- Kye Stewart – Defensive Graduate Assistant
- Tony Tokarz – Offensive Graduate Assistant
- Sherri Schwartz – Assistant to the Head Coach
- Akoya Nelson – Recruiting Secretary
- Braxton Brady – Football Team Chaplain

Legend

- (C) Team captain
- (S) Suspended
- (I) Ineligible
- Injured
- Redshirt

Roster
