= Greg Ward =

American football player (born 1995)

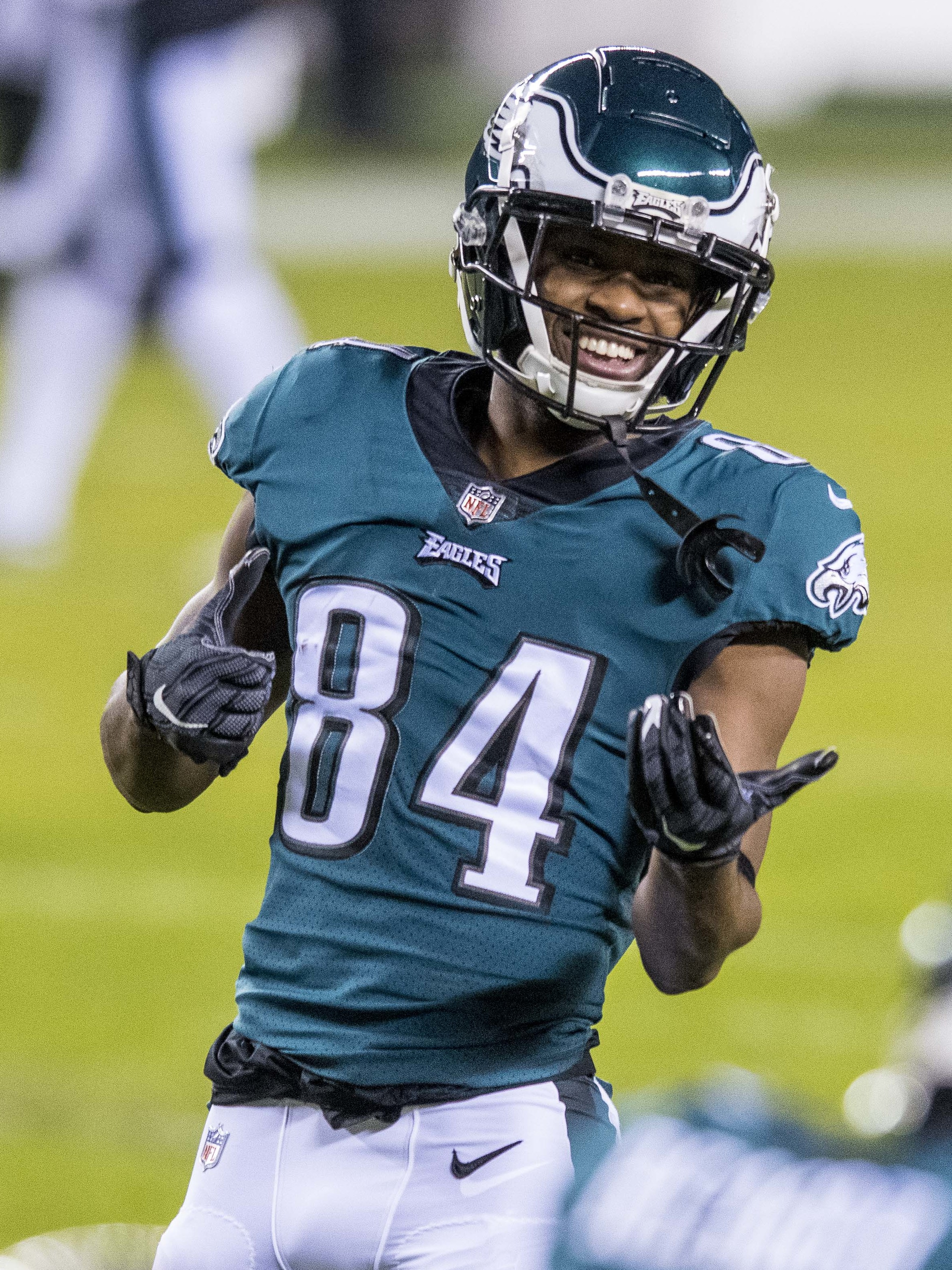
- Ward with the Philadelphia Eagles in 2021

Profile
- Position: Wide receiver

Personal information
- Born: July 12, 1995 (age 31); Tyler, Texas, U.S.
- Listed height: 5 ft 11 in (1.80 m)
- Listed weight: 197 lb (89 kg)

Career information
- High school: John Tyler (Tyler, Texas)
- College: Houston (2013–2016)
- NFL draft: 2017: undrafted

Career history
- Philadelphia Eagles (2017–2018)*; San Antonio Commanders (2019); Philadelphia Eagles (2019–2023); Indianapolis Colts (2024)*; San Antonio Brahmas (2025); Dallas Renegades (2026)
- * Offseason or practice squad member only

Awards and highlights
- Super Bowl champion (LII); Earl Campbell Tyler Rose Award (2015); 2× Second-team All-AAC (2015, 2016)

Career NFL statistics
- Receptions: 88
- Receiving yards: 768
- Receiving touchdowns: 10
- Stats at Pro Football Reference

Gregory Mario Ward Jr. (born July 12, 1995) is an American professional football wide receiver. He played college football at Houston as a quarterback and converted to wide receiver after going undrafted following his college career. Ward was a member of the Eagles' practice squad in 2017 when they won Super Bowl LII. He also played for the San Antonio Commanders of the Alliance of American Football (AAF) in 2019.

== Early life ==
Gregory Mario Ward Jr. was born and raised in Tyler, Texas. One of four children, Ward grew up in a "modest ranch house." Gregory Sr. worked as a truck driver and Pentecostal pastor.

Ward graduated from John Tyler High School in 2013. As a senior, he passed for 4,202 yards and 39 touchdowns while also rushing for 861 yards and 13 touchdowns. He won Player of the Year in Texas High School football. As a junior, Ward threw for 3,596 yards and 32 touchdowns and rushed for 1,212 yards with 18 touchdowns. He played wide receiver his sophomore year and recorded 53 receptions for 667 yards with eight touchdowns. Ward was rated as a three-star recruit and committed to the University of Houston to play college football.

== College career ==
As a true freshman at Houston in 2013, Ward appeared in 10 games as a backup quarterback and wide receiver. He passed for 310 yards with a passing touchdown, rushed for 176 yards with two touchdowns and had 95 receiving yards and a touchdown.

Ward started his sophomore year as a starting wide receiver, recording 15 receptions for 139 yards and a touchdown. In October, Ward took over as the starting quarterback, replacing the benched John O'Korn. He started the final eight games, completing 177-of-263 passes for 2,010 yards and 12 touchdowns. He also added 573 rushing yards with six touchdowns.

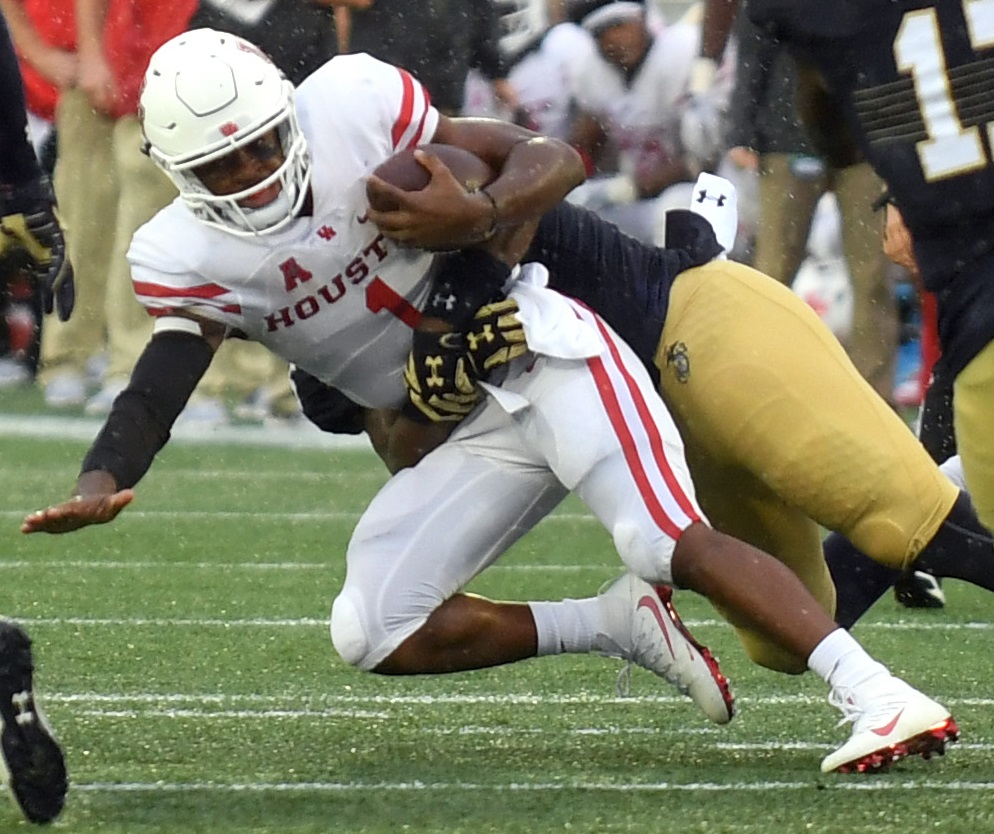
Ward in 2016

Ward remained Houston's starter his junior year in 2015. He was named the MVP of the 2015 American Athletic Conference Football Championship Game after rushing for 148 yards and two touchdowns. On December 31, 2015, Ward helped the Cougars win the Chick-fil-A Peach Bowl against No. 9 Florida State and was named Offensive Player of the Game. He finished the 2015 season with 2,828 passing yards, 17 touchdowns, and six interceptions to go with 19 carries for 1,108 rushing yards and 21 rushing touchdowns.

In the 2016 season, Ward passed for 3,557 yards, 22 touchdowns, and 13 interceptions to go with 197 carries for 518 rushing yards and ten rushing touchdowns.

== Professional career ==
Pre-draft measurables
Height	Weight	Arm length	Hand span	Wingspan	40-yard dash	10-yard split	20-yard split	20-yard shuttle	Three-cone drill	Vertical jump	Broad jump	Bench press
5 ft 10 3/4 in (1.80 m)	186 lb (84 kg)	31 1/8 in (0.79 m)	9 7/8 in (0.25 m)	6 ft 2 1/2 in (1.89 m)	4.59 s	1.56 s	2.69 s	4.31 s	6.90 s	34.5 in (0.88 m)	9 ft 7 in (2.92 m)	10 reps
All values from NFL Combine/Pro Day

=== Philadelphia Eagles (first stint) ===
Ward signed with the Philadelphia Eagles as an undrafted free agent on May 11, 2017. He was waived on September 2, but was signed to the Eagles' practice squad the next day. Ward was released on September 12, and was re-signed to the practice squad on September 18. While Ward was on their practice squad, the Eagles defeated the New England Patriots in Super Bowl LII.

Ward signed a reserve/future contract with the Eagles on February 7, 2018. On September 1, he was waived by the Eagles and was signed to the practice squad the next day. Ward was released again on September 7.

=== San Antonio Commanders ===
On January 1, 2019, Ward signed with the San Antonio Commanders of the Alliance of American Football (AAF). He recorded 22 receptions for 214 yards in the eight games the league lasted.

=== Philadelphia Eagles (second stint) ===
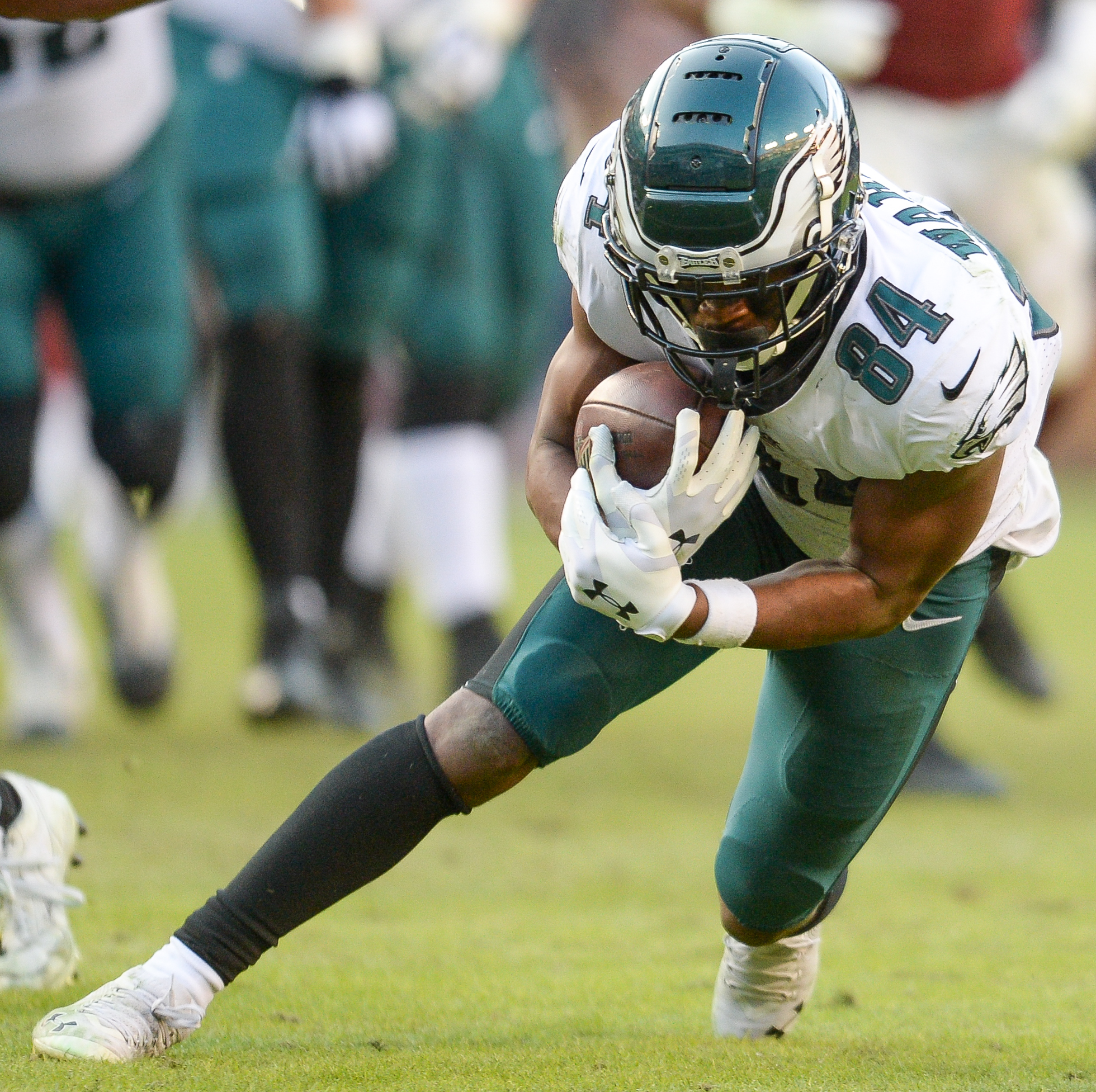
Ward in 2019

After the AAF suspended football operations, Ward re-signed with the Eagles for one year on April 9, 2019. He was waived during final roster cuts on August 31, but was re-signed to the team's practice squad the next day. He was promoted to the team's active roster on September 21, following injuries to DeSean Jackson and Alshon Jeffery.

Ward made his NFL debut in a Week 3 game against the Detroit Lions, but was waived again on September 24. He re-signed to the team's practice squad two days later. Ward was promoted to the active roster again on November 23. He caught six passes for 40 yards in the 17–9 loss to the Seattle Seahawks. In Week 15 against the Washington Redskins, Ward caught seven passes for 61 yards and his first touchdown of his NFL career in the 37–27 victory. Ward finished the 2019 season with 28 receptions for 254 yards.

In Week 3 of the 2020 season against the Cincinnati Bengals, Ward caught eight passes for 72 yards and a touchdown during the 23–23 tie. During Week 13 against the Green Bay Packers, Ward caught the first career touchdown pass thrown by rookie quarterback Jalen Hurts in the 30–16 loss. Two weeks later against the Arizona Cardinals, Ward caught four passes including two touchdowns in the 33–26 loss. Ward finished the 2020 season with 53 receptions for 419 yards and six touchdowns in 16 games.

Ward signed a one-year exclusive-rights free agent tender with the Eagles on March 29, 2021. In 2021, Ward took a reserve role in the receiving corps after the Eagles drafted DeVonta Smith. He ended the season with seven catches for 95 yards and three touchdowns, and he was used in trick plays as a passer, ultimately completing one pass for two yards.

While he initially was not tendered by the Eagles in the 2022 offseason, Ward signed a new one-year deal with the team on March 15. He was placed on injured reserve on August 30, 2022. Ward was released 10 days later. On October 24, he was brought back to the practice squad.

On August 29, 2023, Ward was waived by the Eagles and re-signed to the practice squad. He was released on November 30 and re-signed to the practice squad on December 6. Ward was not signed to a reserve/future contract after the season and became a free agent when his practice squad contract expired.

=== Indianapolis Colts ===
On August 14, 2024, Ward signed with the Indianapolis Colts. He was released on August 25.

=== San Antonio Brahmas ===
On November 21, 2024, Ward signed with the San Antonio Brahmas of the United Football League (UFL).

=== Dallas Renegades ===
On January 13, 2026, Ward was selected by the Dallas Renegades in the 2026 UFL Draft.

== Career statistics ==
=== NFL ===
==== Regular season ====
Year	Team	Games		Receiving					Fumbles	
Year	Team	GP	GS	Rec	Yds	Avg	Lng	TD	Fum	Lost
2019	PHI	7	3	28	254	9.1	38	1	0	0
2020	PHI	16	10	53	419	7.9	32	6	2	0
2021	PHI	17	0	7	95	13.6	27	3	0	0
Total		40	13	88	768	8.7	38	10	2	0
Source: NFL.com

==== Postseason ====
Year	Team	Games		Receiving					Fumbles	
Year	Team	GP	GS	Rec	Yds	Avg	Lng	TD	Fum	Lost
2019	PHI	1	1	3	24	8.0	16	0	0	0
2021	PHI	1	1	0	0	0	0	0	0	0
Total		2	2	3	24	8.0	16	0	0	0
Source: NFL.com

=== AAF/UFL ===
==== Regular season ====
Year	Team	League	Games		Receiving					Rushing					Punt returns				
Year	Team	League	GP	GS	Rec	Yds	Avg	Lng	TD	Att	Yds	Avg	Lng	TD	Ret	Yds	Avg	Lng	TD
2019	SA	AAF	8	8	22	214	9.7	37	0	4	14	1.8	11	0	9	135	15.0	79T	1
2025	SA	UFL	7	5	17	116	6.8	15	1	0	0	0	0	0	1	7	7.0	7	0
2026	DAL	UFL																	
Career			15	13	39	330	8.5	37	1	4	14	1.8	11	0	10	142	14.2	79	1

=== College ===
Season	Team	Games			Passing								Rushing			
Season	Team	GP	GS	Record (Note: Accounts for only GS as a QB. In 2014, Ward started four games at WR.)	Cmp	Att	Pct	Yds	Y/A	TD	Int	Rtg	Att	Yds	Avg	TD
2013	Houston	10	0	—	19	29	65.5	310	10.7	1	0	166.7	45	176	3.9	2
2014	Houston	13	12	6–2	177	263	67.3	2,010	7.6	12	7	141.2	118	573	4.9	6
2015	Houston	14	13	13–0	232	345	67.2	2,828	8.2	17	6	148.9	198	1,108	5.6	21
2016	Houston	12	12	8–4	319	469	68.0	3,557	7.6	22	13	141.7	197	518	2.6	10
Career		49	37	27−6	747	1,106	67.5	8,705	7.9	52	26	144.5	558	2,375	4.3	39
