= Deyshawn Bond =

American football player (born 1994)

No. 69
- Position: Guard

Personal information
- Born: August 19, 1994 (age 32); Indianapolis, Indiana
- Listed height: 6 ft 1 in (1.85 m)
- Listed weight: 299 lb (136 kg)

Career information
- High school: Warren Central (Indianapolis, Indiana)
- College: Cincinnati
- NFL draft: 2017: undrafted

Career history
- Indianapolis Colts (2017)
- Stats at Pro Football Reference

Deyshawn Bond (born August 19, 1994) is an American former football guard. He played college football at Cincinnati.

== Professional career ==
Bond signed with the Indianapolis Colts as an undrafted free agent on May 4, 2017. Bond made the Colts' final roster as an undrafted rookie, and made his NFL debut in Week 1 against the Los Angeles Rams, starting at center in place of the injured Ryan Kelly. He started the next three games at center before suffering a quadriceps injury in Week 4. He was placed on injured reserve on October 3, 2017.

On September 1, 2018, Bond was waived by the Colts.
