= Lee Hightower =

American football player (born 1993)

Profile
- Position: Safety

Personal information
- Born: July 28, 1993 (age 33); Inglewood, California, U.S.
- Listed height: 6 ft 2 in (1.88 m)
- Listed weight: 200 lb (91 kg)

Career information
- High school: Los Angeles (CA) Loyola
- College: Houston
- NFL draft: 2016: undrafted

Career history
- Indianapolis Colts (2016)*; Washington Redskins (2016)*; Indianapolis Colts (2017)*
- * Offseason or practice squad member only
- Stats at Pro Football Reference

Lee Hightower (born July 28, 1993) is an American professional football safety who plays for X-League side Nojima Sagamihara Rise. He played college football at Houston and signed with the Indianapolis Colts as an undrafted free agent after the 2016 NFL draft.

== College career ==
Hightower played football at the University of Houston after transferring from Boise State in 2013.

== Professional career ==
=== Indianapolis Colts (first stint) ===
Hightower signed with the Indianapolis Colts as an undrafted free agent on August 2, 2016. He was released by the Colts on September 3, 2016, and was signed to the practice squad on September 9. He spent time on and off the Colts' practice squad before being waived on October 18, 2016.

=== Washington Redskins ===
On November 8, 2016, Hightower was signed to the Washington Redskins' practice squad. He was released by the Redskins on December 13, 2016.

=== Indianapolis Colts (second stint) ===
On January 12, 2017, Hightower signed a reserve/future contract with the Colts. He was waived on September 2, 2017.
