= 2015 UCF Knights football team =

American college football season

2015 UCF Knights football
- Conference: American Athletic Conference
- East Division
- Record: 0–12 (0–8 The American)
- Head coach: George O'Leary (12th season; first 8 games); Danny Barrett (interim; remainder of season)
- Offensive coordinator: Brent Key (1st season)
- Offensive scheme: Pro-style, option
- Defensive coordinator: Chuck Bresnahan (1st season)
- Base defense: 4–3
- Home stadium: Bright House Networks Stadium

2015 American Athletic Conference football standings
	Conf.			Overall
Team	W		L	W		L
East Division
Temple x	7	–	1	10	–	4
South Florida	6	–	2	8	–	5
Cincinnati	4	–	4	7	–	6
UConn	4	–	4	6	–	7
East Carolina	3	–	5	5	–	7
UCF	0	–	8	0	–	12
West Division
No. 8 Houston xy$	7	–	1	13	–	1
No. 18 Navy x	7	–	1	11	–	2
Memphis	5	–	3	9	–	4
Tulsa	3	–	5	6	–	7
Tulane	1	–	7	3	–	9
SMU	1	–	7	2	–	10
Championship: Houston 24, Temple 13
$ – Conference champion; x – Division champion/co-champions; y – Championship game participant; As of December 31, 2015; Rankings from AP Poll

The 2015 UCF Knights football team represented the University of Central Florida in the 2015 NCAA Division I FBS football season. The Knights were members of the East Division of the American Athletic Conference (The American), defending conference co-champions, and played their home games at Bright House Networks Stadium on UCF's main campus in Orlando, Florida. The Knights were led by head coach George O'Leary, who was in his 12th and final season with the team. After starting the season 0–6, O'Leary resigned as UCF's interim athletic director, a position he had held since June when Todd Stansbury left for the same position at Oregon State. Following UCF's 59–10 defeat by Houston on homecoming, dropping the Knights to an 0–8 record, O'Leary resigned as head football coach. Quarterbacks coach Danny Barrett served as interim head coach for the remainder of the season.

The 2015 season was UCF's third in the American Athletic Conference, and the first year the conference split into two divisions. This was the Knights' first season since 2011 in which they would fail to be eligible for postseason play. This campaign marks UCF's third winless season in program history (along with the 1982 and 2004 seasons).

Coming just two years after the banner BCS-bowl-winning 2013 season that saw them finish in the top 10 nationally, and a year after winning the conference for the second straight year, the 2015 season was not just a failure, but a shocking one. In the aftermath, UCF finally moved on from the O'Leary era and hired renowned offensive coordinator Scott Frost from the Oregon Ducks to be their head coach. After a 6–7 2016 bounce-back campaign, the Knights would go undefeated in 2017 and win the Peach Bowl, completing a turnaround from 0–12 to 13–0 in just two years.

== Personnel ==
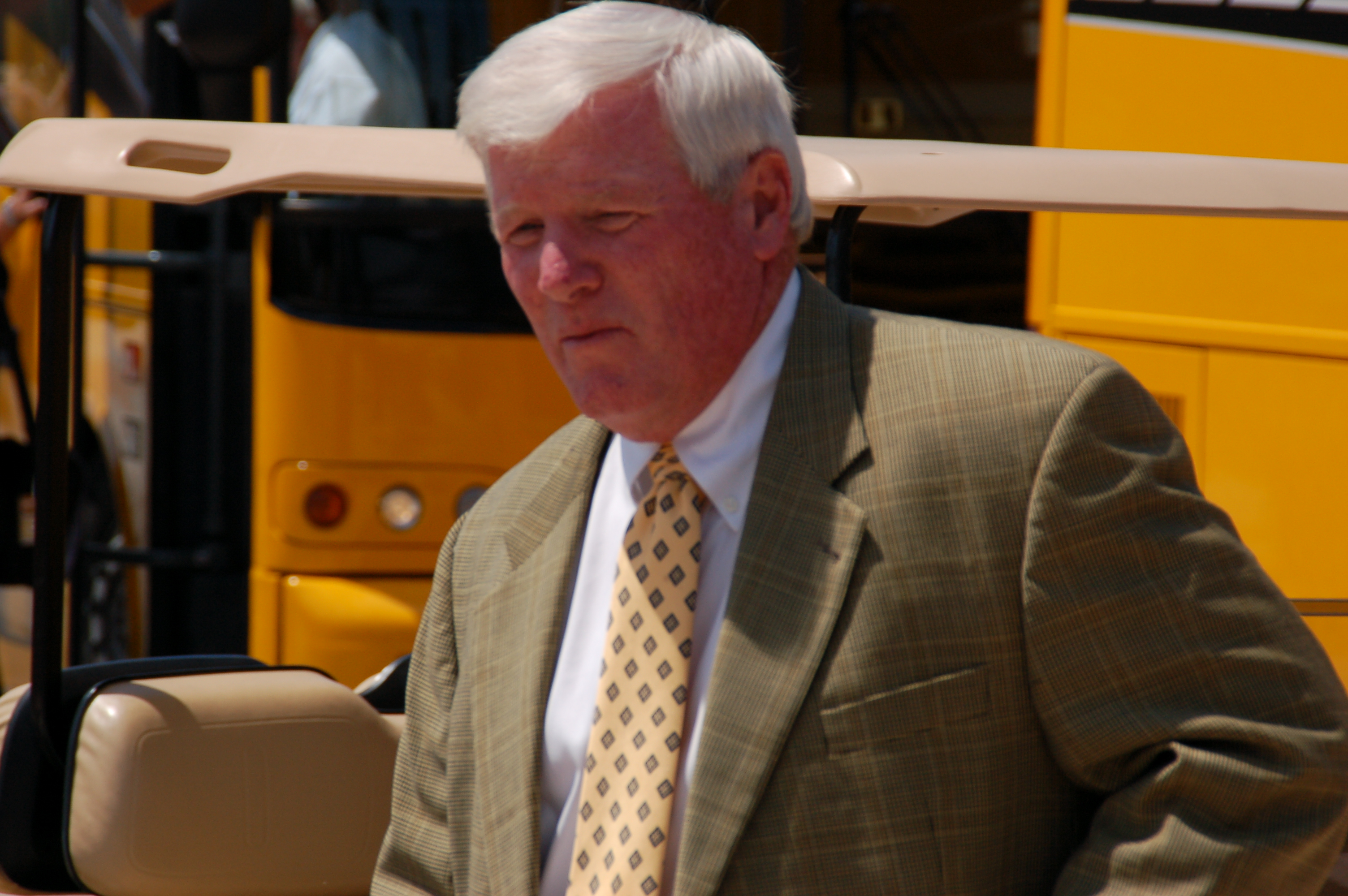
Head Coach George O'Leary

=== Coaching staff ===
2015 UCF Knights coaching staff
Head coaches: Head coach – George O'Leary (resigned after 8 games), Danny Barrett (Interim); Offensive coaches: Offensive coordinator/running backs – Brent Key; Quarterbacks – Danny Barrett; Wide receivers – Sean Beckton; Offensive line – Allen Mogridge; Tight ends/h-backs – Keegan Kennedy; Graduate assistants – Rob Calabrese and Josh Linam; Offensive quality control – Sean Fitzgerald; Defensive coaches: Defensive coordinator/linebackers – Chuck Bresnahan; Safeties – Andrew Thacker; Cornerbacks – Travis Fisher; Defensive line – Lorenzo Costantini; Graduate assistant – Pat Bastien and Zach Crespo; Defensive quality control – Mike Sims-Walker	Special teams: Special teams coordinator – Keegan Kennedy; Administrative staff: Athletic Director (A.D.) – George O'Leary (resigned after 6 games), Brad Stricklin (Interim); Assistant A.D. for Football Operations – Marty O'Leary; Director of player development – Kristy Belden; Director of player personnel – Mike Buscemi; Recruiting assistant – Ryan Callaghan; Special assistant to head coach – Manny Messeguer

=== Roster ===
2015 UCF Knights roster
Quarterbacks: 8 Tyler Harris – (redshirt) freshman; 9 Bo Schneider – freshman; 12 Sean Pratt – sophomore; 13 Justin Holman – junior; Halfbacks: 17 Cedric Thompson – (redshirt) senior; 31 Gary Demarest – (redshirt) freshman; 32 Mario Mathis – (redshirt) sophomore; 39 Joseph Puopolo – (redshirt) senior; 40 Chris Larsen – (redshirt) freshman; 42 Justin Rae – (redshirt) freshman; 43 Aaron Cochran – freshman; Fullbacks: 44 Mark Messeguer – (redshirt) freshman; Running backs: 7 Dontravious Wilson – junior; 27 Taj McGowan – freshman; 28 William Stanback – junior; 29 CJ Jones – (redshirt) freshman; 37 Michael Willett – (redshirt) sophomore; 45 Daron Humphrey – (redshirt) junior; Wide receivers: 2 Nick Patti – (redshirt) junior; 5 Jordan Franks – sophomore; 6 Tristan Payton – freshman; 10 Kyle Coltrain – (redshirt) sophomore; 12 Blake Tiralosi – (redshirt) junior; 14 Pete DiNovo – (redshirt) sophomore; 20 Taylor Oldham – (redshirt) junior; 21 Jamari Fye – (redshirt) sophomore; 23 Adrian Gordon – (redshirt) sophomore; 25 Tristan Reaves – (redshirt) freshman; 26 Trace Ryan – (redshirt) freshman; 80 Tre'Quan Smith – (redshirt) freshman; 81 Chris Johnson – (redshirt) sophomore; 82 D'erren Wilson – freshman; 83 Cam Stewart – freshman; 86 Michael Colubiale – (redshirt) sophomore; 88 Jordan Akins – sophomore; 89 Hayden Jones – (redshirt) junior	Tight ends: 46 Zack Laurinaitis – (redshirt) freshman; 49 Joe Turk – freshman; 84 Michael Campbell – (redshirt) junior; 87 Cal Bloom – (redshirt) junior; Offensive line: 55 Joey Grant – Graduate Student; 61 Tarik Cook – (redshirt) senior; 62 Micah Anderson – (redshirt) junior; 63 Nick George – (redshirt) freshman; 66 Aaron Evans – (redshirt) sophomore; 67 Jared Warren – (redshirt) sophomore; 68 Charles Sprenkel – (redshirt) sophomore; 70 Luke Palmer – (redshirt) freshman; 71 Chester Brown – (redshirt) junior; 72 Tyler Hudanick – freshman; 73 Jason Rae – junior; 74 Jake Brown – freshman; 75 Tate Hernly – (redshirt) sophomore; 76 Colby Watson – junior; 78 Wyatt Miller – (redshirt) freshman; 79 Chavis Dickey – sophomore; Linebackers: 16 Mark Rucker – (redshirt) junior; 34 Justin McDonald – junior; 40 Chequan Burkett – (redshirt) sophomore; 41 Demeitre Brim – (redshirt) junior; 50 Domenic Spencer – senior; 51 Errol Clarke – (redshirt) junior; 52 Maurice Russell – (redshirt) junior; 53 Quintin Hampton – freshman; 54 Alex Hunt – (redshirt) sophomore; 56 Pat Jasinski – freshman; 57 Neal Nelson – freshman; 58 Marcus Foster – freshman	Defensive line: 49 Seyvon Lowry – (redshirt) sophomore; 59 Monte Taylor – junior; 69 Thomas Niles – (redshirt) senior; 90 Lance McDowdell – senior; 91 Joey Connors – (redshirt) freshman; 92 Luke Adams – (redshirt) junior; 93 Tony Guerad – (redshirt) sophomore; 94 Demetris Anderson – (redshirt) senior; 95 Jamiyus Pittman – sophomore; 96 A.J. Wooten – (redshirt) freshman; 97 Jock Petree – (redshirt) sophomore; 98 Brendon Hayes – freshman; 99 Titus Davis – freshman; Defensive backs: 3 Mike Rogers – freshman; 10 Shaquill Griffin – junior; 18 Shaquem Griffin – (redshirt) sophomore; 21 Drico Johnson – (redshirt) junior; 22 T.J. Mutcherson – Graduate Student; 24 D.J. Killings – junior; 25 Kyle Gibson – (redshirt) freshman; 26 Brandon Scott – freshman; 30 Rashard Causey Jr. – freshman; 31 Jeremy Boykins – junior; 33 Tre Neal – (redshirt) freshman; 35 Brendin Straubel – (redshirt) senior; 38 Nevelle Clarke – freshman; 48 Jerod Boykins – junior	Punters/Kickers: 11 Matthew Wright – (redshirt) freshman; 19 Donald De La Haye – freshman; 36 Caleb Houston – (redshirt) junior; 47 Connor O'Sullivan – (redshirt) sophomore; 48 Mac Loudermilk – (redshirt) freshman; Snappers: 53 Mason Bedell – freshman; 54 Gage Marsil – (redshirt) junior; 60 Caleb Perez – (redshirt) freshman; Terms: Freshman – A player in his first year.; Sophomore – A player in his second year.; Junior – A player in his third year.; Senior – A player in his fourth year.; Redshirt – A player who sat out a previous season.
"2015 UCF Knights roster". UCF Athletics Association.

=== Recruiting class ===
College recruiting (2015)
Name	Hometown	School	Height	Weight	40^{‡}	Commit date
Rashard Causey Jr. CB	Miami, FL	St. Thomas Aquinas	6 ft 0 in (1.83 m)	190 lb (86 kg)	4.44	Jan 30, 2015
Rashard Causey Jr. CB	Recruit ratings: Scout: Rivals: (81)					
Nevelle Clarke; DB	Coral Springs, FL	JP Taravella	6 ft 2 in (1.88 m)	185 lb (84 kg)	NA	May 12, 2015
Nevelle Clarke; DB	Recruit ratings: (N/A)					
Aaron Cochran; HB	Atlanta, GA	Benjamin E. Mays High School	6 ft 3 in (1.91 m)	250 lb (110 kg)	NA	Feb 4, 2015
Aaron Cochran; HB	Recruit ratings: Scout: Rivals: (74)					
Titus Davis; DE	Stockbridge, GA	Stockbridge	6 ft 2 in (1.88 m)	228 lb (103 kg)	5.28	Jul 16, 2014
Titus Davis; DE	Recruit ratings: Scout: Rivals: (78)					
Marcus Foster; OLB	League City, TX	Clear Falls	6 ft 1 in (1.85 m)	200 lb (91 kg)	NA	Jul 28, 2014
Marcus Foster; OLB	Recruit ratings: Scout: Rivals: (NR)					
Quintin Hampton; ILB	Moultrie, GA	Colquitt County	5 ft 11 in (1.80 m)	225 lb (102 kg)	NA	Jul 18, 2014
Quintin Hampton; ILB	Recruit ratings: Scout: Rivals: (74)					
Brendon Hayes; DE	New Orleans, LA	Brother Martin	6 ft 4 in (1.93 m)	240 lb (110 kg)	NA	Dec 14, 2014
Brendon Hayes; DE	Recruit ratings: Scout: Rivals: (NR)					
Luke Hiers; OC	Lake Wales, FL	Lake Wales	6 ft 3 in (1.91 m)	290 lb (130 kg)	5.62	Sep 28, 2014
Luke Hiers; OC	Recruit ratings: Scout: Rivals: (77)					
Tyler Hudanick; OG	Harmony, PA	Seneca Valley Senior	6 ft 5 in (1.96 m)	290 lb (130 kg)	NA	Jan 18, 2015
Tyler Hudanick; OG	Recruit ratings: Scout: Rivals: (NR)					
Pat Jasinski; OLB	Roswell, GA	Blessed Trinity	6 ft 2 in (1.88 m)	200 lb (91 kg)	5.02	Jun 18, 2014
Pat Jasinski; OLB	Recruit ratings: Scout: Rivals: (75)					
Taj McGowan; RB	Hallandale Beach, FL	Hallandale	6 ft 1 in (1.85 m)	190 lb (86 kg)	4.45	Jun 13, 2014
Taj McGowan; RB	Recruit ratings: Scout: Rivals: (72)					
Neal Nelson; OLB	Sicklerville, NJ	Timber Creek	6 ft 1 in (1.85 m)	225 lb (102 kg)	4.81	Jun 24, 2014
Neal Nelson; OLB	Recruit ratings: Scout: Rivals: (76)					
Tristan Payton; WR	Jacksonville, FL	First Coast	6 ft 0 in (1.83 m)	187 lb (85 kg)	4.63	Jan 25, 2015
Tristan Payton; WR	Recruit ratings: Scout: Rivals: (83)					
Bo Schneider; QB-PP	Dallas, TX	Jesuit	6 ft 3 in (1.91 m)	219 lb (99 kg)	NA	Jun 10, 2014
Bo Schneider; QB-PP	Recruit ratings: Scout: Rivals: (76)					
Brandon Scott; S	Destrehen, LA	Destrehen	6 ft 0 in (1.83 m)	183 lb (83 kg)	4.5	Feb 4, 2015
Brandon Scott; S	Recruit ratings: Scout: Rivals: (78)					
Cameron Stewart; WR	Snellville, GA	Snellville	6 ft 3 in (1.91 m)	190 lb (86 kg)	4.8	Apr 15, 2014
Cameron Stewart; WR	Recruit ratings: Scout: Rivals: (80)					
Monte Taylor; DE	Brooklyn, NY	ASA College	6 ft 4 in (1.93 m)	260 lb (120 kg)	NA	Jan 18, 2015
Monte Taylor; DE	Recruit ratings: Scout: Rivals: (NR)					
D'erron Wilson; WR	Greenville, TX	Greenville	6 ft 3 in (1.91 m)	187 lb (85 kg)	4.71	Jan 25, 2015
D'erron Wilson; WR	Recruit ratings: Scout: Rivals: (NR)					
Overall recruit ranking: Scout: 76
‡ Refers to 40-yard dash; Note: In many cases, Scout, Rivals, 247Sports, On3, and ESPN may conflict in their listings of height, weight and 40 time.; In these cases, the average was taken. ESPN grades are on a 100-point scale.; Sources: "UCF 2015 Football Commitments". Rivals.; "2015 UCF Football Commits". Scout.; "ESPN". ESPN.; "Scout.com Team Recruiting Rankings". Scout.; "2015 Team Ranking". Rivals.com.

== Schedule ==
The 2015 schedule was officially released by The American on February 19, 2015. The 2015 schedule is the first for the conference under a new permanent system developed to address expanded membership and the creation of divisions. UCF will face eight conference opponents: Cincinnati, UConn, East Carolina, Houston, South Florida, Temple, Tulane, and Tulsa. The Knights will also play four non-conference games: Florida International (C-USA), Furman (FCS), South Carolina (SEC), and Stanford (Pac-12).

Date	Time	Opponent	Site	TV	Result	Attendance
September 3	6:00 pm	FIU*	Bright House Networks Stadium; Orlando, FL	CBSSN	L 14–15	39,184
September 12	10:30 pm	at Stanford*	Stanford Stadium; Stanford, CA	FS1	L 7–31	50,420
September 19	6:00 pm	Furman (FCS)*	Bright House Networks Stadium; Orlando, FL	ESPN3	L 15–16	36,484
September 26	12:00 pm	at South Carolina*	Williams-Brice Stadium; Columbia, SC	ESPNU	L 14–31	78,411
October 3	12:00 pm	at Tulane	Yulman Stadium; New Orleans, LA	ESPNews	L 31–45	20,024
October 10	3:45 pm	UConn	Bright House Networks Stadium; Orlando, FL (Civil Conflict)	ESPNews	L 13–40	26,669
October 17	7:30 pm	at Temple	Lincoln Financial Field; Philadelphia, PA	CBSSN	L 16–30	31,372
October 24	12:00 pm	No. 21 Houston^{†}	Bright House Networks Stadium; Orlando, FL	ESPNews	L 10–59	28,350
October 31	12:00 pm	at Cincinnati	Nippert Stadium; Cincinnati, OH (rivalry)	ESPNews	L 7–52	30,131
November 7	12:00 pm	at Tulsa	Chapman Stadium; Tulsa, OK	ESPNews	L 30–45	16,128
November 19	7:30 pm	East Carolina	Bright House Networks Stadium; Orlando, FL	ESPN	L 7–44	23,734
November 26	7:30 pm	South Florida	Bright House Networks Stadium; Orlando, FL (War on I–4)	ESPN	L 3–44	25,967
*Non-conference game; ^{†}Homecoming; Rankings from AP Poll released prior to the game; All times are in Eastern time

== Game summaries ==
=== FIU ===
FIU vs. UCF – Game Summary

Quarter	1	2	3	4	Total
Panthers	3	0	6	6	15
Knights	7	7	0	0	14

at Bright House Networks Stadium, Orlando, Florida

- Date: September 3, 2015
- Game time: 6:00 p.m. EDT
- Game weather: 91 °F (33 °C), Sunny
- Game attendance: 39,184
- Referee: Daniel Gautreaux (C-USA)
- TV announcers (CBSSN): Dave Ryan (play-by-play), Corey Chavous (color commentator), and Lauren Gardner (sideline reporter)
- Recap

Game information

First quarter

- FIU – Austin Taylor 28 yard field goal, 6:10 (FIU 3–0)
- UCF – Jordan Akins 9 yard pass from Justin Holman, 0:16 (UCF 7–3)

Second quarter

- UCF – Jordan Akins 33 yard pass from Justin Holman, 10:07 (UCF 14–3)

Third quarter

- FIU – Alex Gardner run for 7 yards (2-pt. conv. failed), 8:41 (UCF 14–9)

Fourth quarter

- FIU – Ya'Keem Griner 3 yard pass from Alex McGough, 12:52 (FIU 15–14)

Top Passer

- Justin holman – 23/34, 249 YDS, TD

Top Rusher

- Dontravious wilson – 12 CAR, 34 YDS

Top Receiver

- Jordan akins – 9 REC, 104 YDS, 2TD

This was the fourth meeting between UCF and the FIU Golden Panthers, with the series tied 2–2. The Knights won the previous meeting, a 38–0 shutout at FIU in 2013. FIU got onboard first with a field goal. UCF then responded with two touchdowns by Jordan Akins to take a 14–3 lead at halftime. In the second half, the Knights were plagued with defensive struggles which allowed FIU to take the lead 15–14. UCF then set up within field goal distance with thirty-seconds left; however, a Matthew Wright field goal was blocked and FIU ran out the clock.

The loss was UCF's first to a Florida opponent since September 17, 2011, UCF's first meeting with FIU, as well as UCF's first home opener loss since 2007 to Texas. The loss also marks UCF's first home loss since September 28, 2013 to South Carolina, as well as UCF's first Thursday night loss since November 3, 2011 against Tulsa.

=== Stanford ===
UCF vs. Stanford – Game Summary

Quarter	1	2	3	4	Total
Knights	0	0	0	7	7
Cardinal	0	10	7	14	31

at Stanford Stadium, Stanford, California

- Date: September 12, 2015
- Game time: 10:30 p.m. EDT
- Game weather: 70 °F (21 °C), Perfect
- Game attendance: 50,240
- Referee: Rick Loumiet (The American)
- TV announcers (FS1): Tim Brando (play-by-play) and Spencer Tillman (color commentator)
- Recap

Game information

Second quarter

- STAN – Michael Rector 53 yard pass from Kevin Hogan, 4:23 (STAN 7–0)
- STAN – Conrad Ukropina 52 yard field goal, 0:52 (STAN 10–0)

Third quarter

- STAN – Christian McCaffrey 7 yard pass from Kevin Hogan, 1:15 (STAN 17–0)

Fourth quarter

- STAN – Bryce Love 93 yard pass from Kevin Hogan, 9:06 (STAN 24–0)
- STAN – Barry Sanders run for 20 yards, 2:13 (STAN 31–0)
- UCF – Tre'Quan Smith 36 yard pass from Tyler Harris, 1:22 (STAN 31–7)

Top Passer

- Tyler harris – 7/15, 105 YDS, TD

Top Rusher

- Taj mcgowan – 20 CAR, 67 YDS

Top Receiver

- Jordan akins – 5 REC, 48 YDS

This was the first meeting between UCF and the Stanford Cardinal. The trip represented the longest travel for any FBS team during the 2015 season, at 2,427 miles. The loss also results in UCF's second consecutive season starting with an 0–2 record.

=== Furman ===
UCF vs. Furman – Game Summary

Quarter	1	2	3	4	Total
Paladins	0	7	6	3	16
Knights	7	5	3	0	15

at Bright House Networks Stadium, Orlando, Florida

- Date: September 19, 2015
- Game time: 6:00 p.m. EDT
- Game weather: 80 °F (27 °C), Clear
- Game attendance: 36,484
- Referee: Charles Lamertian (The American)
- TV announcers (ESPN3): Drew Fellios (play-by-play) and Forrest Conoly (color commentator)
- Recap

Game information

First quarter

- UCF – Nick Patti run for 5 yards, 1:45 (UCF 7–0)

Second quarter

- UCF – Matthew Wright 24 yard field goal, 13:07 (UCF 10–0)
- UCF – Safety by Chequan Burkett, 9:06 (UCF 12–0)
- FUR – Ernie Cain run for 1 yard, 1:10 (UCF 12–7)

Third quarter

- FUR – Andrej Suttles 61 yard pass from Reese Hannon (2-pt. conv. failed), 10:24 (FUR 13–12)
- UCF – Matthew Wright 29 yard field goal, 0:11 (UCF 15–13)

Fourth quarter

- FUR – Jon Croft Hollingsworth 55 yard field goal, 12:10 (FUR 16–15)

Top Passer

- Bo schneider – 7/11, 63 YDS, INT

Top Rusher

- Nick patti – 14 CAR, 58 YDS, TD

Top Receiver

- Blake tiralosi – 5 REC, 35 YDS

This was the second meeting between UCF and the Furman Paladins, with the Paladins winning a 1984 game, 42–6. This was QB Bo Schneider's first career start, going 7-for-11 for 63 yards. UCF initially took a 12–0 lead, which included the first sacks of the season for defense, one of those resulting in a safety. After getting a turnover on downs, Furman scored a touchdown with 1:10 remaining in the half. At the third quarter, Tyler Harris started as QB. A few minutes into the 3rd quarter, Furman scored a 61-yard touchdown which gave them the lead 13–12. Towards the end of the quarter, UCF kicked a field goal to retake the lead 15–13. Furman responded with a 55-yard field goal to retake the lead 16–15. With forty-nine seconds remaining, QB Tyler Harris threw an interception which sealed the victory for the Paladins. The game marked the Knights first loss to an FCS team since ascending to Division I-A (FBS) in 1996 (20–1), as well as their first 0–3 start since 2004.

=== South Carolina ===
UCF vs. South Carolina – Game Summary

Quarter	1	2	3	4	Total
Knights	0	14	0	0	14
Gamecocks	3	5	20	3	31

at Williams-Brice Stadium, Columbia, South Carolina

- Date: September 26, 2015
- Game time: 12:00 p.m. EDT
- Game weather: 72 °F (22 °C), Cloudy
- Game attendance: 78,411
- Referee: Michael Roche (The American)
- TV announcers (ESPNU): Clay Matvick (play-by-play) and John Congemi (color commentator)
- Recap

Game information

First quarter

- USC – Elliott Fry 52 yard field goal, 9:47 (USC 3–0)

Second quarter

- USC – Safety, 14:42 (USC 5–0)
- UCF – Nick Patti run for 1 yard, 11:04 (UCF 7–5)
- UCF – Tre'Quan Smith 30 yard pass from Bo Schneider, 5:23 (UCF 14–5)
- USC – Elliott Fry 27 yard field goal, 1:04 (UCF 14–8)

Third quarter

- USC – Pharoh Cooper run for 29 yards, 7:41 (USC 15–14)
- USC – Jacob August 13 yard pass from Lorenzo Nunez, 4:39 (USC 22–14)
- USC – Pharoh Cooper 35 yard pass from Lorenzo Nunez (2-pt. conv. failed), 1:47 (USC 28–14)

Fourth quarter

- USC – Elliott Fry 33 yard field goal, 2:53 (USC 31–14)

Top Passer

- Bo schneider – 20/35, 189 YDS, TD, 2 INT

Top Rusher

- C.J. Jones – 9 CAR, 22 YDS

Top Receiver

- Tre'Quan Smith – 5 REC, 82 YDS, TD

This was the fifth meeting between UCF and the South Carolina Gamecocks. With the loss, UCF remains winless against South Carolina. After falling behind 5–0, Bo Schneider, in his second career start, led the Knights to fourteen unanswered points to take a 14–5 lead with five minutes remaining in the second quarter. After entering halftime with a six-point lead, UCF was held scoreless in the second half. USC QB Lorenzo Nunez threw for two scores, Pharoh Cooper had two touchdowns, one rushing and one receiving, and K Elliott Fry had a field goal to give the Gamecocks a 31–14 win. The loss dropped the Knights to 0–4, the first time the team has started the season winless through four games since 2004, when UCF went 0–11.

=== Tulane ===
UCF vs. Tulane – Game Summary

Quarter	1	2	3	4	Total
Knights	7	3	0	21	31
Green Wave	7	17	14	7	45

at Yulman Stadium, New Orleans, Louisiana

- Date: October 3, 2015
- Game time: 12:00 p.m. EDT
- Game weather: 64 °F (18 °C), Cloudy
- Game attendance: 20,024
- Referee: Adam Savoie (The American)
- TV announcers (ESPNews): Jason Benetti (play-by-play) and Brian Kinchen (color commentator)
- Recap

Game information

First quarter

- UCF – Jordan Franks 8 yard pass from Bo Schneider, 7:27 (UCF 7–0)
- TULN – Kendall Ardoin 2 yard pass from Tanner Lee, 1:32 (Tied 7–7)

Second quarter

- TULN – Andrew DiRocco 23 yd field goal, 4:54 (TULN 10–7)
- TULN – Teddy Veal 49 yard pass from Tanner Lee, 4:20 (TULN 17–7)
- TULN – Sherman Badie run for 4 yards, 2:22 (TULN 24–7)
- UCF – Matthew Wright 34 yd field goal, 0:05 (TULN 24–10)

Third quarter

- TULN – Devon Breaux 8 yard pass from Tanner Lee, 5:50 (TULN 31–10)
- TULN – Rob Kelley 4 yard pass from Tanner Lee, 4:52 (TULN 38–10)

Fourth quarter

- UCF – Tyler Harris D'erren Wilson 14 yard pass from Tyler Harris, 10:49 (TULN 38–17)
- TULN – Devin Powell pass complete to Rickey Preston for 17 yards, 8:20 (TULN 45–17)
- UCF – Tyler Harris D'erren Wilson 24 yard pass from Tyler Harris, 6:33 (TULN 45–24)
- UCF – D'erren Wilson 13 yard pass from Tyler Harris, 2:57 (TULN 45–31)

Top Passer

- Bo schneider – 20/37, 236 YDS, TD, 3 INT

Top Rusher

- Taj mcgowan – 9 CAR, 11 YDS

Top Receiver

- D'erren Wilson – 7 REC, 114 YDS, 3 TD

The game marked the seventh meeting between UCF and the Tulane Green Wave. UCF holds a 5–2 advantage against Tulane, losing for the first time in the series since 2006. The loss marks the first time UCF lost their first conference game of the season since 2009 when they fell to Southern Miss. After going ahead 7–0 with a pass from Bo Schneider to Jordan Franks, Tulane scored 24 unanswered points taking a 24–10 halftime lead. By the end of the 3rd quarter, Tulane took a 38–10 lead. Additionally, Bo Schneider was sacked 7 times for a total of 45 yards, one of those resulting in a fumble, and threw 3 interceptions, each resulting in Tulane touchdowns. Tyler Harris entered after the beginning of the 4th quarter and scored 3 touchdowns on all of his drives, each connecting to D'erren Wilson, who finished the game with 7 receptions, 114 yards, and 3 touchdowns.

=== UConn ===
UConn vs. UCF – Game Summary

Quarter	1	2	3	4	Total
Huskies	9	14	17	0	40
Knights	3	0	0	10	13

at Bright House Networks Stadium, Orlando, Florida

- Date: October 10, 2015
- Game time: 12:00 p.m. EDT
- Game weather: 85 °F (29 °C), Overcast
- Game attendance: 26,669
- Referee: Rick Loumiet (The American)
- TV announcers (ESPNU): Anish Shroff (play-by-play) and Ahmad Brooks (color commentator)
- Recap

Game information

First quarter

- UCF – Matt Wright 19 yard field goal, 10:06 (UCF 3–0)
- CONN – Arkeel Newsome run for 5 yards for a TD, 6:02 (CONN 7–3)
- CONN – Safety, 6:01 (CONN 9–3)

Second quarter

- CONN – Bryant Shirreffs run for 1 yard for a TD, 1:22 (CONN 16–3)
- CONN – Noel Thomas 16 yard pass from Bryant Shirreffs, 0:49 (CONN 23–3)

Third quarter

- CONN – Bobby Puyol 21 yard field goal, 11:50 (CONN 26–3)
- CONN – Ron Johnson run for 12 yard for a TD, 9:12 (CONN 33–3)
- CONN – Arkeel Newsome run for 8 yard for a TD, 1:53 (CONN 40–3)

Fourth quarter

- UCF – Matt Wright 45 yard field goal, 9:22 (CONN 40–6)
- UCF – Nick Patti 11 yard pass from Justin Holman, 1:38 (CONN 40–13)

Top Passer

- Justin holman – 27/50, 256 YDS, TD, 3 INT

Top Rusher

- C.J. Jones – 7 CAR, 44 YDS

Top Receiver

- Michael Willett – 5 REC, 65 YDS

This was the third meeting between UCF and the UConn Huskies. UCF beat UConn in 2013 62–17 in Orlando, while in 2014, UConn upset UCF 37–29 in East Hartford. As of the start of the 2015 season, the 2014 meeting was the only conference loss for UCF since joining The American. QB Justin Holman returned for the Knights after a three-game absence following his injury against Stanford. On the first drive, Holman led the Knights seventy-three yards but UCF had to settle for a 19-yard field goal from Matthew Wright. Afterwards the Huskies dominated the Knights both defensively and offensively and scored forty unanswered points to score their second consecutive victory over UCF. Through six games, the Knights were outscored 70–3 in the third quarter. 3 turnovers doomed the Knights, including Hayden Jones accidentally stepping out of his end zone on a kickoff return and going back in to take a knee that ended up giving UConn a safety in the 1st quarter.

This loss broke UCF's thirteen game home conference win streak dating back to November 25, 2011 against UTEP. This was also the lowest home attendance for a UCF game since November 25, 2011 against UTEP with an average of 26,669 fans. The 40–13 loss became the largest loss deficit in Bright House Networks Stadium history at this point, as well as the largest home loss deficit for UCF since they fell to Pittsburgh 52–7 in 2006 in the Citrus Bowl. The Knights are one of five winless teams remaining following week seven. Two days after the game, George O'Leary announced that he was stepping down as the interim director of athletics.

=== Temple ===
UCF vs. Temple – Game Summary

Quarter	1	2	3	4	Total
Knights	3	10	3	0	16
Owls	7	7	0	16	30

at Lincoln Financial Field, Philadelphia, Pennsylvania

- Date: October 17, 2015
- Game time: 7:30 p.m. EDT
- Game weather: 52 °F (11 °C), Cloudy
- Game attendance: 31,372
- Referee: Todd LaPenta
- TV announcers (CBSSN): Dave Ryan (play-by-play), Corey Chavous (color commentator), and Lauren Gardner (sideline reporter)
- Recap

This will be the third meeting between UCF and the Temple Owls. UCF holds a 2–0 advantage, with their first victory involving a one-handed catch by JJ Worton in the final minutes of the 4th quarter, which to this day remains one of the best catches in college football. UCF then beat Temple 34–14 in Orlando in 2014, their last meeting. At the beginning of the second quarter, Temple got on top 14–3. Later on in the second quarter, UCF recorded their first interception of the season as Shaquill Griffin caught a pass by P.J. Walker and returned it for an 81-yard touchdown. At halftime, UCF trailed Temple 14–13 after a field goal by Matthew Wright. UCF then took the lead in the third quarter after another Matthew Wright field goal, 16–14. Temple, however, pulled away with two touchdowns both with 2-point conversions. 2 interceptions by Holman in the second half as well as penalties from offense ended UCF's quest for bowl eligibility for the first time since 2011.

=== Houston ===
Houston vs. UCF – Game Summary

Quarter	1	2	3	4	Total
#21 Cougars	7	17	28	7	59
Knights	7	3	0	0	10

at Bright House Networks Stadium, Orlando, Florida

- Date: October 24, 2015
- Game time: 12:00 p.m. EDT
- Game weather: 82 °F (28 °C), Partly cloudy
- Game attendance: 28,350
- Referee: Michael Roche
- TV announcers (ESPNews): Mike Corey (play-by-play), Rene Ingoglia, and Ahmad Brooks (color commentators)
- Recap

This was the seventh meeting between UCF and the Houston Cougars. UCF had won the previous four games, with the two most recent victories from defensive plays, both from Brandon Alexander. The Knights had a promising opening drive, which ended on an 85-yard fumble return for Houston to take a 7–0 lead. Afterwards, Holman connected with Tristan Payton for a 46-yard touchdown, the first of Payton's career, to tie the game 7–7. After taking a 10–7 lead in the second quarter the Knights allowed 52 unanswered points. The 49-point loss is the largest home-loss in UCF history, and the 59-points allowed is the fourth-most in program history. Following the loss, UCF head football coach George O'Leary resigned.

=== Cincinnati ===
UCF vs. Cincinnati – Game Summary

Quarter	1	2	3	4	Total
Knights	0	0	0	7	7
Bearcats	21	14	14	3	52

at Nippert Stadium, Cincinnati, Ohio

- Date: October 31, 2015
- Game time: 12:00 p.m. EDT
- Game weather: 47 °F (8 °C), Rain
- Game attendance: 30,131
- TV announcers (ESPNews): Jim Barbar (play-by-play) and Rene Ingoglia (color commentator)
- Recap

This was the first meeting between UCF and the Cincinnati Bearcats. In a disastrous first game as interim head coach, Danny Barrett's team struggled offensively and defensively against his alma mater, the Cincinnati Bearcats. Cincinnati QB Gunner Kiel managed to complete all 15 of his passes for 319 yards and 5 TDs, as defense struggled tremendously despite the second interception of the season by Shaquill Griffin. Field goals were also a struggle for UCF this game, as the Knight's two field goal attempts were all missed. CJ Jones managed to score the only points for UCF in the 4th quarter to avoid the shutout.

=== Tulsa ===
UCF vs. Tulsa – Game Summary

Quarter	1	2	3	4	Total
Knights	3	0	17	10	30
Golden Hurricane	14	10	0	21	45

at Chapman Stadium, Tulsa, Oklahoma

- Date: November 7, 2015
- Game time: 12:00 p.m. EDT
- Game weather: 58 °F (14 °C), Sunny
- Game attendance: 16,128
- Referee: Tracy Jones
- TV announcers (ESPNews): Eamon McAnaney (play-by-play) and Rocky Boiman (color commentator)
- Recap

This was the ninth meeting between UCF and the Tulsa Golden Hurricane. Tulsa holds a 5–3 advantage, but UCF won the most recent one in 2014 with a 31–7 blowout. UCF has yet to defeat Tulsa at H.A. Chapman Stadium. During the first quarter, Holman threw an underthrown deep pass to Tre'Quan Smith, who turned around and leaped over a Tulsa defensive back to catch the ball in midair. However, UCF trailed at halftime 24–3. UCF came alive in the third quarter and scored 2 touchdowns as well as a field goal to only trail 24–20 by the beginning of the 4th quarter, one of the touchdowns being the first of Taj McGowan's career. Additionally, defense recorded two interceptions by Brendin Straubel and Chequan Burkett, as well as a fumble forced by Tre Neal on a Tulsa kickoff return. UCF's offense ended up scoring on all of those opportunities. Despite this, Tulsa ended up pulling away with a 45–30 victory, which included a pick-six. As of this week, UCF is one of two winless teams, the other one being the Kansas Jayhawks.

=== East Carolina ===
East Carolina vs. UCF – Game Summary

Quarter	1	2	3	4	Total
Pirates	14	17	13	0	44
Knights	7	0	0	0	7

at Bright House Networks Stadium, Orlando, Florida

- Date: November 14, 2015
- Game time: 7:30 p.m. EST
- Game weather: 75 °F (24 °C), Showers
- Game attendance: 23,734
- Referee: Michael Roche
- TV announcers (ESPN): Joe Tessitore (play-by-play), David Pollack, Jesse Palmer (color commentators), and Kaylee Hartung (sideline reporter)
- Recap

This was the fourteenth meeting between UCF and the East Carolina Pirates. East Carolina has a 10–4 advantage, UCF had won the last two games, the most recent being in 2014 with a Hail Mary pass in the final seconds from Justin Holman to Breshad Perriman, 32–30. UCF's first drive ended on a Tre'Quan Smith TD while Jordan Franks caught a 44-yard pass beforehand. That was the last time the Knights scored. Plagued by turnovers and injuries, including one to starting QB Justin Holman, UCF lost 44–7 to East Carolina.

=== South Florida ===
South Florida vs. UCF – Game Summary

Quarter	1	2	3	4	Total
Bulls	7	17	14	6	44
Knights	3	0	0	0	3

at Bright House Networks Stadium, Orlando, Florida

- Date: November 26, 2015
- Game time: 7:30 p.m. EST
- Referee: Tracy Jones
- TV announcers (ESPN): Joe Tessitore (play-by-play), David Pollack, Jesse Palmer (color commentators), and Kaylee Hartung (sideline reporter)
- Recap

This was the seventh meeting between UCF and the South Florida Bulls in the War On I–4. USF has a 5–2 advantage. UCF had won the last two, with the most recent giving the USF Bulls their first home shutout in school history as well as UCF's first victory at Raymond James Stadium, 16–0. This was the first game since 1995 that UCF wore both black jerseys and black pants. Similar to the last game, UCF ended up scoring only on their first drive, which was a field goal by Matthew Wright. UCF then allowed 44 unanswered points by the Bulls, which gave UCF their first loss to USF since 2008, as well as their first conference loss in the series. This was the 12th loss of the season, which made UCF finish winless for the third time in their history. UCF was not alone, as the Kansas Jayhawks finished their season 0–12 as well, both teams being the only FBS teams to go winless.
