= Shaquem Griffin =

American football player (born 1995)

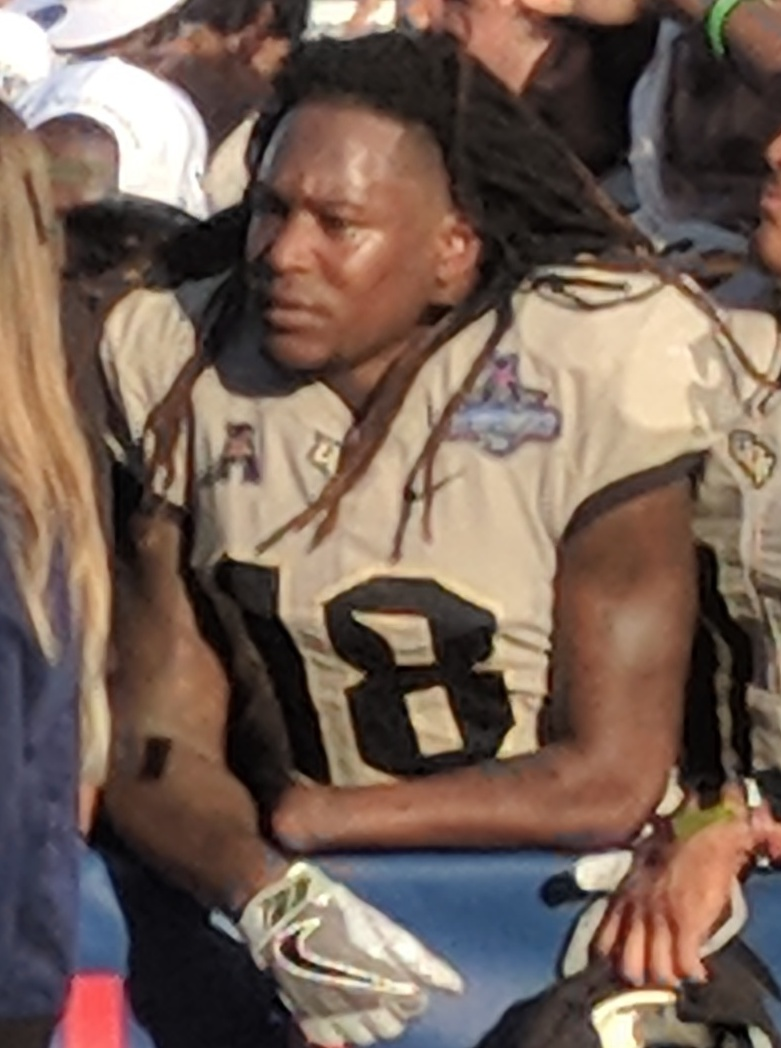
- Griffin with the UCF Knights in 2017

No. 49, 53
- Position: Linebacker

Personal information
- Born: July 20, 1995 (age 31); St. Petersburg, Florida, U.S.
- Listed height: 6 ft 0 in (1.83 m)
- Listed weight: 227 lb (103 kg)

Career information
- High school: Lakewood (St. Petersburg)
- College: UCF (2013–2017)
- NFL draft: 2018: 5th round, 141st overall pick

Career history
- Seattle Seahawks (2018–2020); Miami Dolphins (2021)*
- * Offseason or practice squad member only

Awards and highlights
- Colley Matrix national champion (2017); AAC Defensive Player of the Year (2016); Peach Bowl Defensive MVP (2018); Second-team All-American (2017); 2× First-team All-AAC (2016, 2017); American Athletic Conference Fifth Anniversary Team (2018); NCAA Inspiration Award (2019); Sports Emmy Award (2019); UCF Athletics Hall of Fame (2024)

Career NFL statistics
- Total tackles: 25
- Sacks: 1.0
- Stats at Pro Football Reference

Shaquem Alphonso Griffin /ʃəˈkiːm/ (born July 20, 1995) is an American former professional linebacker who played in the National Football League (NFL) for four seasons.

He is the twin brother of Shaquill Griffin, and both brothers played college football at UCF. When Griffin was 4 years old, he had his left hand amputated; Griffin later received extensive media coverage as a prospective 2018 NFL draft pick. He was selected as a fifth-round pick (141st overall) by the Seahawks on April 28, 2018, reuniting him with Shaquill.

Griffin played with the Seahawks for three seasons before spending part of the 2021 season with the Miami Dolphins' practice squad. He retired during the 2022 offseason.

== Early life ==
Shaquem Alphonso Griffin was born to Terry and Tangie Griffin on July 20, 1995, in St. Petersburg, Florida, less than two minutes after Shaquill. Shaquem was born with amniotic band syndrome affecting his left hand, causing his fingers on his left hand not to fully develop. The pain was so intense that at 4 years of age he grabbed a butcher knife, planning to cut the hand off. His mother took the knife away, and his parents scheduled an amputation the next day. Still, Griffin was able to continue playing sports without his left hand, competing in track, baseball, and football alongside his brother.

Griffin attended and played high school football at Lakewood, where he played safety. He attended the 2011 Under Armour Combine. He helped Lakewood reach the 2012 Florida 5A regional semifinals. He earned Second Team 5A All-State and Tampa Bay Times Second Team All-Suncoast honors. He played in the 2012 Florida Athletic Coaches Association North-South All-Star Game. USA Football selected him to the 2013 U.S. Under-19 National Team, playing for whom earned him national attention after an interception by Griffin landed on ESPN's Top 10 Plays. He was rated a three-star recruit prospect by both Rivals and ESPN.

He was also a four-year letter earner in track and field, including the 4x100 relay, triple jump, shot put, and discus. After winning the triple jump state title, and breaking two Lakewood records, he was named the Tampa Bay Times Track and Field Athlete of the Year in Pinellas County (Florida). He received collegiate track and field interest from programs including LSU, Miami, and Purdue.

== College career ==
College recruiting
Name	Hometown	School	Height	Weight	40^{‡}	Commit date
Shaquem Griffin; Linebacker	St. Petersburg, Florida	Lakewood HS	6 ft 1 in (1.85 m)	183 lb (83 kg)	4.63	
Shaquem Griffin; Linebacker	Recruit ratings: Scout: Rivals: 247Sports: (70)					
Overall recruit ranking:
‡ Refers to 40-yard dash; Note: In many cases, Scout, Rivals, 247Sports, On3, and ESPN may conflict in their listings of height, weight and 40 time.; In these cases, the average was taken. ESPN grades are on a 100-point scale.; Sources: "2012 Team Ranking". Rivals.com.

Shaquem and his brother Shaquill were both offered football scholarships at the University of Central Florida (UCF) by then-coach George O'Leary, with Shaquill rejecting offers from other teams including the Miami Hurricanes, his dream team, to play with Shaquem. Griffin spent his whole college career at UCF, totaling 17 sacks and 30 tackles for a loss. Notable plays also include an interception versus the Temple Owls and a fumble recovery for a touchdown versus the Austin Peay Governors, both during the 2017 season.

In his second season, playing as a redshirt freshman, Shaquem Griffin had a brief stint as a second-string player on the depth chart before being demoted to third string and then scout team. Griffin pointed out that Coach O'Leary often "bullied and belittled me" and Griffin said "he'd threaten me if I was on campus at certain times".

Griffin attributes his rise in his redshirt junior and redshirt senior seasons to Scott Frost's hiring as head coach for the 2016 and 2017 seasons. Writing for The Players' Tribune, Griffin said that, following his winless third season under O'Leary, "Coach Frost came in and brought me back into the light... He gave me the opportunity I had been waiting for ever since I first arrived at UCF. And I took advantage of it".

Griffin was named the 2016 American Athletic Conference Defensive Player of the Year and the Defensive MVP of the 2018 Peach Bowl. In Griffin's senior season, UCF went undefeated and subsequently claimed a national championship. (Note: The NCAA recognizes the Alabama Crimson Tide and Griffin's UCF Knights as 2017 national champions, with Alabama listed first. UCF was ranked #1 in the Colley Matrix, while other selectors chose Alabama.) Griffin told Ralph Warner and NFL Network in November 2017 that he planned to continue his football career in the NFL.

Shaquem stayed at UCF one season longer than Shaquill, as Shaquem redshirted his freshman year while Shaquill saw playing time. Shaquill graduated and was drafted by the Seattle Seahawks in the third round (90th overall pick) of the 2017 NFL draft, while Shaquem stayed on for his redshirt senior year at UCF.

After the end of his college career, Griffin was named as one of two recipients of the 2019 NCAA Inspiration Award, presented to individuals currently or formerly associated with NCAA athletics for especially inspirational efforts in dealing with life-altering personal situations. He received the award alongside Maggie Nichols, the first individual to report having been sexually assaulted by Larry Nassar.

== Professional career ==
=== Pre-draft ===
External videos
- Shaquem Griffin runs fastest 40-yard dash by a linebacker
- UCF LB Shaquem Griffin puts up 20 reps on the bench press
- "I Am Shaquem Griffin" NFL video

Despite not initially receiving an invitation, Griffin participated in the NFL Scouting Combine in March 2018. He made headlines for performing 20 reps in the bench press while wearing a prosthesis and for running the 40-yard dash in 4.38 seconds, the fastest time for a linebacker since the NFL has released official statistics.

Pre-draft measurables
Height	Weight	Arm length	Hand span	Wingspan	40-yard dash	10-yard split	20-yard split	Three-cone drill	Vertical jump	Broad jump	Bench press
6 ft 0 3/8 in (1.84 m)	227 lb (103 kg)	32 1/8 in (0.82 m)	9 in (0.23 m)	5 ft 6 1/2 in (1.69 m)	4.38 s	1.53 s	2.58 s	6.95 s	35.5 in (0.90 m)	9 ft 9 in (2.97 m)	20 reps
All values from NFL Combine and Pro Day

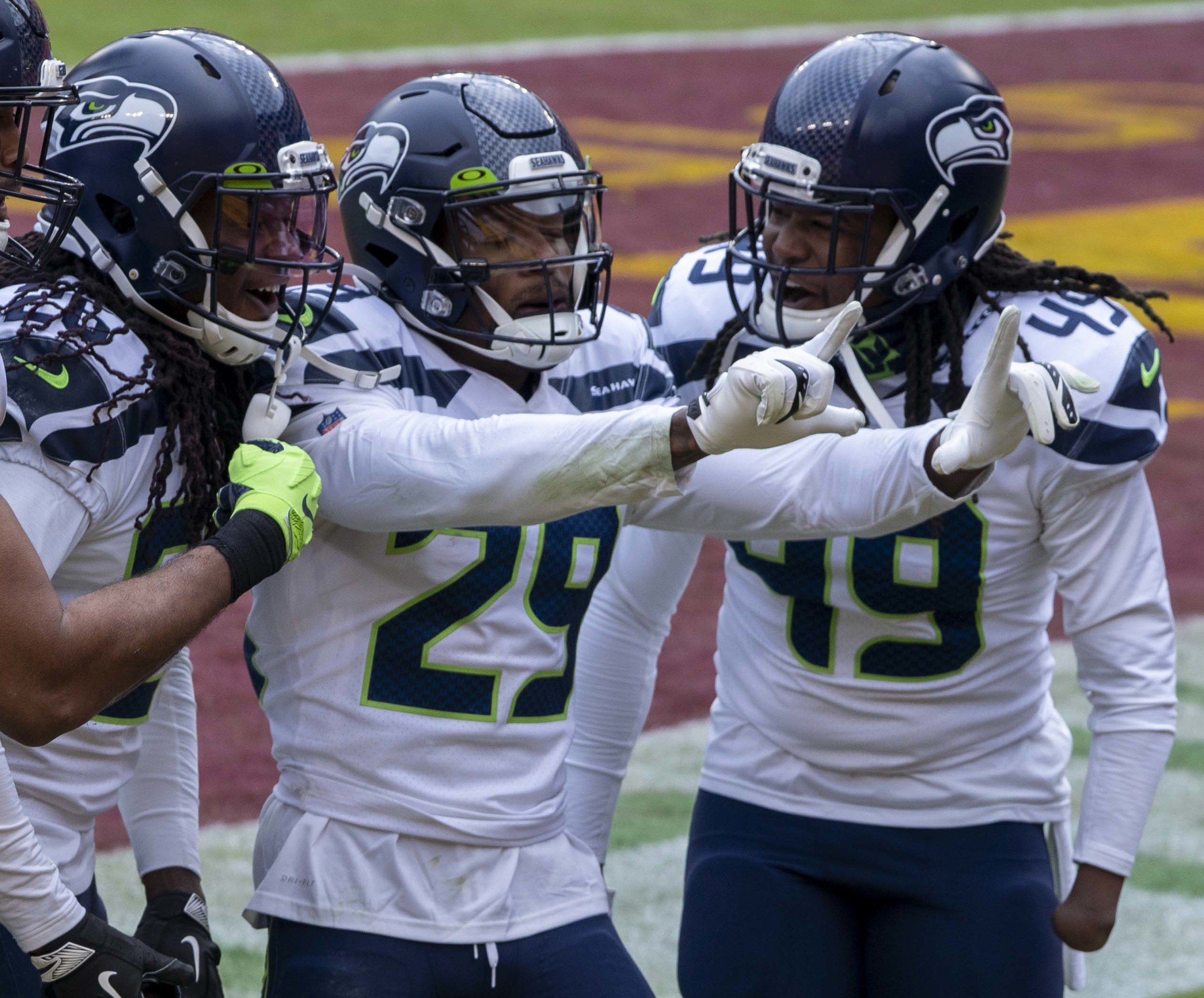
Shaquem (right) and Shaquill Griffin (left) celebrating with D. J. Reed during a 2020 game at FedExField

Despite the fact that he was not projected as a first-round pick, Griffin received an invitation to the 2018 NFL draft, which he accepted on March 29, 2018. Griffin received extensive press and social media coverage leading up to and during the draft, as he would have been the first one-handed player drafted into the NFL if chosen.

=== Seattle Seahawks ===
On April 28, 2018, he was selected by the Seattle Seahawks in the fifth round (141st overall), which they acquired along with Duane Brown in exchange for the 80th pick in the 2018 NFL draft. reuniting him with his brother Shaquill. On May 17, 2018, Griffin signed a four-year deal worth $2.8 million with $300,000 guaranteed.

On August 9, 2018, Griffin made his preseason debut against the Indianapolis Colts in CenturyLink Field, leading his team in tackles with six solo tackles and three assisted tackles. On August 30, 2018, he again led the team in tackles with four solo and three assisted tackles in the final week of the preseason against the Oakland Raiders. Griffin led the Seahawks in total tackles for the entire 2018 NFL preseason with fifteen, tied with fellow linebacker Austin Calitro. On September 9, 2018, Griffin was named as a starter in the first game of his NFL career due to veteran linebacker K. J. Wright being unable to play. He made three solo tackles in the 27–24 loss to the Denver Broncos at Mile High Stadium. He finished his rookie season with 11 total tackles in 16 games and one start. He was a contributor on special teams throughout his rookie season.

In the 2019 season, Griffin appeared in all 16 games. He had a role on special teams throughout the season. Towards the back end of the season, he contributed to the defense. In the Divisional Round of the playoffs in the 2019 season, Griffin recorded one sack on Aaron Rodgers during the 28–23 loss to the Green Bay Packers.

Griffin was waived by the Seahawks during final roster cuts on September 5, 2020, and signed to the team's practice squad the next day. He was elevated to the active roster on September 26 for the team's week 3 game against the Dallas Cowboys, and reverted to the practice squad after the game. He was promoted to the active roster on October 2, 2020.

In Week 14 against the New York Jets, Griffin recorded a sack on Sam Darnold during the 40–3 win. In the 2020 season, Griffin had one sack, nine total tackles, and one pass defended in 14 games. He had a role on special teams.

=== Miami Dolphins ===
On July 23, 2021, Griffin agreed to a one-year contract with the Miami Dolphins. He was waived on August 31, and re-signed to the practice squad. Griffin was released on October 19.

=== Retirement ===
On August 24, 2022, Griffin published an article in The Players' Tribune announcing his retirement from football after four seasons to join the NFL Legends Community, a community of former players offering mentoring services to current and former players.

== Career statistics ==
Legend
**Bold**	Career high

=== NFL ===
==== Regular season ====
Year	Team	Games		Tackles					Interceptions	
Year	Team	GP	GS	Cmb	Solo	Ast	Sck	TfL	PD	Int
2018	SEA	16	1	**11**	**8**	**3**	0.0	0	0	0
2019	SEA	16	0	5	3	2	0.0	0	0	0
2020	SEA	14	0	9	6	**3**	**1.0**	**1**	**1**	0
Career		46	1	25	17	8	1.0	1	1	0

==== Postseason ====
Year	Team	Games		Tackles					Interceptions	
Year	Team	GP	GS	Cmb	Solo	Ast	Sck	TfL	PD	Int
2018	SEA	1	0	**1**	0	**1**	0.0	0	0	0
2019	SEA	2	0	**1**	**1**	0	**1.0**	**1**	0	0
2020	SEA	1	0	0	0	0	0.0	0	0	0
Career		4	0	2	1	1	1.0	1	0	0

== Personal life ==
In high school, Griffin earned the United States Achievement Academy Student of Excellence Award, the Mr. LHS Award (for Lakewood High School), and the 2012 Mike June Courage Award. The St. Petersburg mayor presented him with a "key to the city" in high school. He and his twin brother, Shaquill, founded a track club in their hometown of St. Petersburg.

== Works ==
- Griffin, Shaquem (March 2, 2018). "A Letter to NFL GMs". The Players' Tribune.
- Shaquem Griffin & Shaquill Griffin with Mark Schlabach, Inseparable: How Family and Sacrifice Forged a Path to the NFL. (2019) ISBN 978-0-7852-3081-6.
