= Mark Schlabach =

American sports journalist, author, columnist, and reporter

- Born: Knox, Indiana, U.S.

Mark Schlabach is an American sports journalist, author, columnist, and reporter for ESPN.com.

== Career ==
Schlabach joined ESPN.com in July 2006 as a college football and college basketball columnist. He is notable during college football season for the weekly "On the Mark" column and is a regular contributor to ESPN programs like Outside the Lines, College Football Live, and SportsCenter.

Schlabach graduated from the University of Georgia. He is a member of Sigma Nu fraternity. He spent nine years at The Atlanta Journal-Constitution, covering University of Georgia, the Southeastern Conference, the National Football League (NFL), and NASCAR. Later, Schlabach spent two years at The Washington Post covering college football, college basketball, and boxing.

Schlabach is the author of nearly one dozen books, including the New York Times best sellers Called to Coach: Reflections on Life, Faith, and Football, a collaboration with former Florida State Seminoles football coach Bobby Bowden; The Duck Commander Family: How Faith, Family and Ducks Built a Dynasty, a collaboration with Duck Commander CEO Willie Robertson and his wife, Korie Robertson; and Happy, Happy, Happy: My Life and Legacy as the Duck Commander, and unPHILtered: The Way I See It, which were collaborations with Duck Dynasty's Phil Robertson. Schlabach is also the co-author of the New York Times bestseller, Sicology 1: Tales and Wisdom from Duck Dynasty's Favorite Uncle, a collaboration with Duck Dynasty star Si Robertson, and Good Call: Reflections on Faith, Family and Fowl, a collaboration with Duck Dynasty's Jase Robertson.

On May 19, 2013, Happy, Happy, Happy debuted as the No. 1 best-selling nonfiction book and e-book on The New York Times' Best Sellers list. In September 2013, Schlabach had three books he co-authored on the New York Times bestsellers list simultaneously -- Sicology 1 was ranked No. 1, Happy, Happy, Happy was No. 3 and The Duck Commander Family was No. 9. Good Call: Reflections Faith, Family and Fowl debuted at No. 6 on May 25, 2014, and UnPhiltered debuted at No. 2 on September 21, 2014.

Schlabach is also the co-author of Heisman: The Man Behind the Trophy and other college football books about the University of Florida, Florida State University, University of Georgia, and Virginia Tech. Schlabach's tweets on Deandre Ayton's wiretapping controversy came under some fire with some questioning Schlabach's knowledge, involvement, and motives for such tweets.

== Bibliography ==
- Destiny's Dogs: Georgia's Championship Season (2003) ISBN 978-1-58261-691-9
- What It Means to Be a Hokie (2006) ISBN 978-1-57243-851-4
- What It Means to Be a Seminole (2007) ISBN 978-1-57243-950-4
- What It Means to be a Gator (2008) ISBN 978-1-60078-116-2
- Georgia Football: Yesterday & Today (2009) ISBN 1412716578
- Called to Coach: Reflections on Life, Faith, and Football (2010) ISBN 1439195978
- Always a Hokie: Players, Coaches, and Fans Share Their Passion for Hokies Football (2011) ISBN 1600786189
- Heisman: The Man Behind the Trophy (2012) ISBN 978-1-45168-291-5
- The Duck Commander Family: How Faith, Family and Ducks Built a Dynasty (2012) ISBN 978-147670-354-1
- Happy, Happy, Happy: My Life and Legacy and the Duck Commander (2013) ISBN 978-147672-609-0
- Sicology 1: Tales and Wisdom from Duck Dynasty's Favorite Uncle (2013) ISBN 978-147674-537-4
- Good Call: Reflections on Faith, Family, and Fowl (2013) ISBN 978-1476763538
- unPHILtered: The Way I See It (2014) ISBN 978-1476766232
- "Death Row Chaplain: Unbelievable True Stories from America's Most Notorious Prison" (2015) ISBN 1476777772
- Inseparable: How Family and Sacrifice Forged a Path to the NFL (2019) with Shaquem Griffin and Shaquill Griffin ISBN 978-0-7852-3081-6
