= Inseparable (Griffin and Griffin book) =

2019 sports autobiography

Inseparable: How Family and Sacrifice Forged a Path to the NFL
- First edition
- Author: Shaquem Griffin; Shaquill Griffin; Mark Schlabach
- Cover artist: Kristen Paige Andrews; Sara Kauss
- Language: English
- Genre: Autobiography
- Publisher: W Publishing Group
- Publication date: 2019
- Publication place: United States
- Media type: Print (hardcover)
- Pages: 214 pp.
- ISBN: 978-0-7852-3081-6 (hardcover)
- OCLC: 1107699378
- Dewey Decimal: 796.332092/2 B
- LC Class: GV939.A1 G78 2019

Inseparable: How Family and Sacrifice Forged a Path to the NFL is an autobiography by American National Football League (NFL) players and twin brothers Shaquem Griffin and Shaquill Griffin. It was published by W Publishing Group, an imprint of Thomas Nelson, in 2019. The brothers wrote their autobiography with assistance from American sports journalist ESPN and ghostwriter Mark Schlabach.

== Plot summary ==
The book follows the lives of the Griffin brothers from birth through making it on the same NFL team, the Seattle Seahawks. The brothers start out training together and eventually pursue their football dreams separately, though yearning to compete alongside each other on the same team in the end. Through the course of their journey, two overarching themes emerge: 1) the importance of familial support in achieving one's goals, and 2) the role of faith in God for overcoming hardship and adversity.

=== Visuals ===
In addition to text, the autobiography contains eight pages of photographs printed in color ink.

== Background and release ==
As part of promotion for the book's release, the Griffin brothers revealed on The Today Show they wrote the book in part to make themselves relatable to others. In the interview, Shaquill Griffin also provided a very direct answer as to why they made the book, "What motivated us was, first off, the way we were raised, in a household that was based off of [sic] family, faith, love, caring, and if you've got a story to tell, tell it". Mark Schlabach appeared on a radio show hosted by Mike Bianchi leading up to the release of the book where he shared why he took on the role of contributing author:

I don't get the opportunity to tell these types of stories much anymore and there aren't enough of these stories being told anymore. You want to write stories that make people feel good; you want to write stories that inspire people and have a positive effect on the world, because, Lord knows, we sure need that right now. I hope when people read this book it will make them smile and feel good inside. If that happens then I think we've done our job.

On Tuesday July 9, 2019 the book was officially released after being available for pre-order on Amazon prior to its release.

== Promotion ==
All three authors contributed to the promotion of the book. Shaquem and Shaquill Griffin appeared on The Today Show in addition to promoting the book in-person at the 2019 ESPY Awards, where they literally carried the book in-hand as part of their promotion at the awards show. Around the time of the release of the book, the Griffin brothers also appeared on the Good Day L.A. program. They also promoted the book on their social media accounts, including Twitter, and the book was covered in an article published by the Orlando Sentinel highlighting their ties to the University of Central Florida. Mark Schlabach appeared on a Mike Bianchi radio show, which Bianchi followed up with additional press coverage in the form of an article published in the Chicago Tribune. Additional promotion included coverage of the book by Yahoo! and Fox News around the time of the book's release.

== Reception ==
Follow-up coverage of the book after its promotion and release includes being referenced in an article by NBC Sports Northwest that discussed the departure of Shaquem Griffin from the Seattle Seahawks and his accomplishments while he was part of the team, which included writing and publishing this book.

== See also ==
- 2019 in literature
