= Shaquill Griffin =

American football player (born 1995)

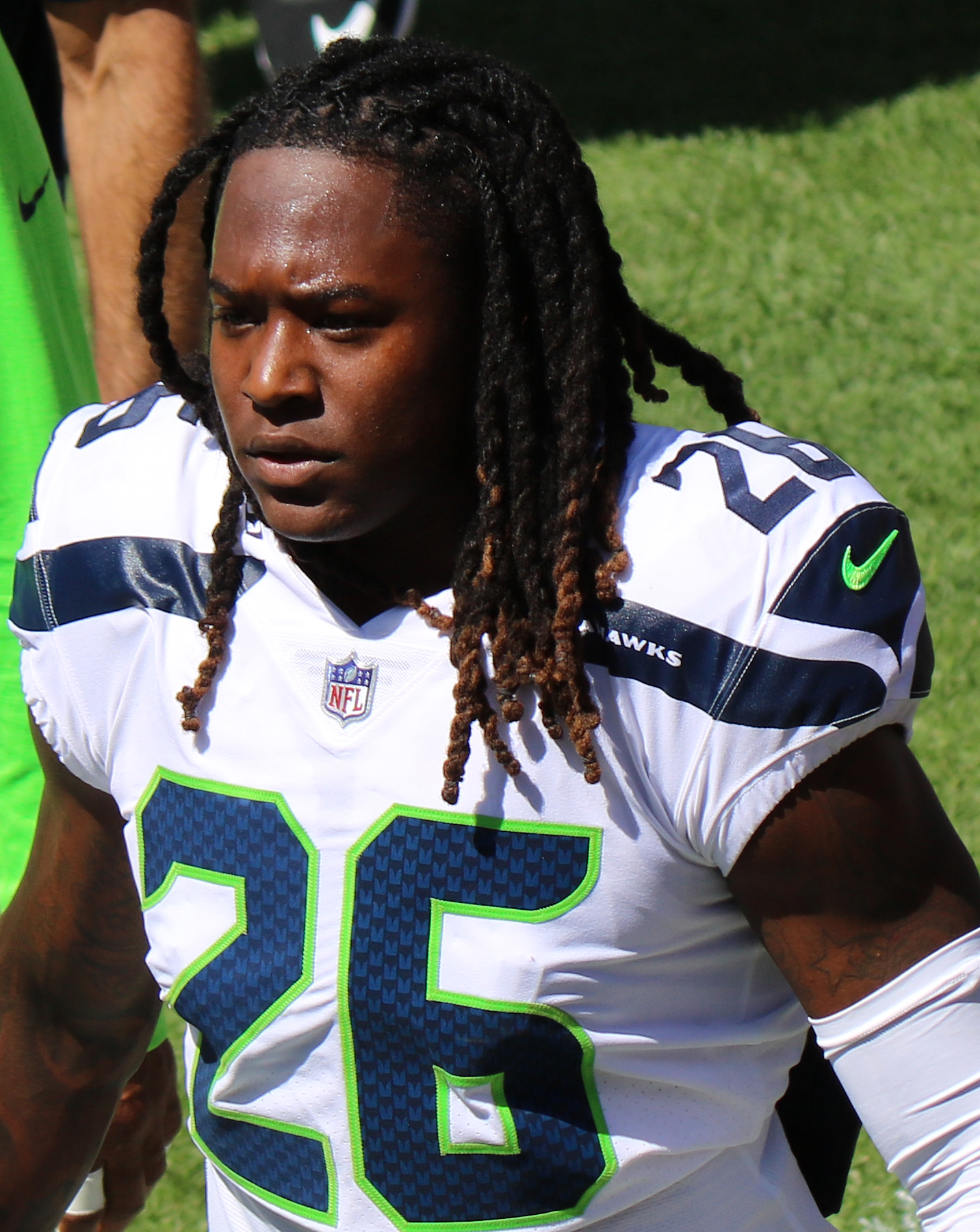
- Griffin with the Seattle Seahawks in 2018

Profile
- Position: Cornerback

Personal information
- Born: July 20, 1995 (age 31); St. Petersburg, Florida, U.S.
- Listed height: 6 ft 0 in (1.83 m)
- Listed weight: 198 lb (90 kg)

Career information
- High school: Lakewood (St. Petersburg)
- College: UCF (2013–2016)
- NFL draft: 2017: 3rd round, 90th overall pick

Career history
- Seattle Seahawks (2017–2020); Jacksonville Jaguars (2021–2022); Houston Texans (2023); Carolina Panthers (2023); Minnesota Vikings (2024); Seattle Seahawks (2025)

Awards and highlights
- Super Bowl champion (LX); Pro Bowl (2019); Second-team All-AAC (2016)

Career NFL statistics as of 2025
- Total tackles: 414
- Sacks: 1.0
- Forced fumbles: 1
- Pass deflections: 70
- Interceptions: 9
- Stats at Pro Football Reference

Shaquill Griffin (/ʃəˈkiːl/; born July 20, 1995) is an American professional football cornerback. He is the twin brother of former linebacker Shaquem Griffin, and both brothers played college football for the UCF Knights. Griffin was selected by the Seattle Seahawks in the third round of the 2017 NFL draft.

== Early life ==
Shaquill Griffin was born to Tangie and Terry Griffin on July 20, 1995, in St. Petersburg, Florida, less than two minutes before Shaquem. Shaquill and Shaquem competed together in track, baseball, and football.

Griffin attended Lakewood High School in St. Petersburg, Florida. He played high school football for the Spartans. He chose to attend UCF after high school.

== College career ==
Griffin played for the University of Central Florida (UCF) Knights from 2013 to 2016, rejecting offers from other teams including the Miami Hurricanes, his dream team, to play with his twin brother Shaquem. He left UCF one season before Shaquem, as Shaquem redshirted his freshman year while Shaquill saw playing time.

As a freshman, Shaquill recorded six total tackles and one pass defensed in four games. As a sophomore, Shaquill recorded 15 total tackles and an interception in six games. As a junior, he recorded 43 total tackles, one interception returned for a touchdown (against Temple), and 11 passes defensed in 11 games. As a senior, he recorded 49 total tackles, four interceptions (one against Tulane returned for a touchdown), 15 passes defensed, and one fumble recovery.

== Professional career ==
=== Pre-draft ===
Griffin accepted his invitation to the NFLPA Collegiate Bowl. On January 24, 2017, he appeared in the NFLPA Collegiate Bowl for Jim Zorn's American team and recorded three combined tackles as they lost 27–7 to the National team. He was one of 35 collegiate cornerbacks to be invited to the NFL Scouting Combine in Indianapolis, Indiana. Griffin was a top performer among his position group, finishing second in the broad jump, third in the vertical jump, and ran the fourth-fastest 40-yard dash among all defensive backs. On March 22, 2017, Griffin attended Central Florida's pro day, but opted to stand on his combine numbers and only performed positional drills for team representatives and scouts from 20 NFL teams and three CFL teams. Throughout the draft process, Griffin had private workouts and visits with multiple teams, including the Pittsburgh Steelers, Tennessee Titans, Detroit Lions, Indianapolis Colts, San Francisco 49ers, Seattle Seahawks, Dallas Cowboys, and Philadelphia Eagles. At the conclusion of the pre-draft process, Griffin was projected to be a third- or fourth-round pick by NFL draft experts and scouts. He was ranked the 17th-best cornerback prospect in the draft by NFLDraftScout.com.

Pre-draft measurables
Height	Weight	Arm length	Hand span	Wingspan	40-yard dash	10-yard split	20-yard split	20-yard shuttle	Three-cone drill	Vertical jump	Broad jump	Bench press
6 ft 0 1/8 in (1.83 m)	194 lb (88 kg)	32 3/8 in (0.82 m)	8 3/4 in (0.22 m)	6 ft 2 3/4 in (1.90 m)	4.38 s	1.50 s	2.55 s	4.14 s	6.87 s	38.5 in (0.98 m)	11 ft 0 in (3.35 m)	17 reps
All values from NFL Combine

=== Seattle Seahawks (first stint) ===
==== 2017 ====
The Seahawks selected Griffin in the third round (90th overall) of the 2017 NFL draft. He was the 13th cornerback selected in 2017. On June 15, 2017, the Seahawks signed Griffin to a four-year, $3.25 million contract that includes a signing bonus of $758,620. Griffin joined the defensive unit nicknamed the Legion of Boom for its final season.

Throughout training camp, Griffin competed against Jeremy Lane, DeShawn Shead, and Neiko Thorpe for the starting cornerback job. Head coach Pete Carroll named Griffin the fourth cornerback on the depth chart behind Richard Sherman, Jeremy Lane, and Neiko Thorpe.

He made his professional regular season debut in the Seahawks' season-opener at the Green Bay Packers and made a season-high ten combined tackles and deflected one pass during their 17–9 loss. Griffin played the majority of the game after Jeremy Lane was ejected in the first quarter after allegedly throwing a punch at Packers wide receiver Davante Adams. On October 8, 2017, Griffin made his first career start after Jeremy Lane was inactive after suffering a groin injury during their Week 4 victory over the Colts. He finished the Seahawks' 16–10 win against the Los Angeles Rams with six solo tackles and one pass deflection. The following week, Griffin earned his second consecutive start with Lane still inactive and recorded three solo tackles and a season-high three pass deflections in Seattle's 24–7 victory at the New York Giants. After Lane returned from injury, head coach Pete Carroll stated Griffin would remain the starting cornerback entering Week 8.

On November 20, 2017, Griffin recorded one solo tackle before leaving the Seahawks' 34–31 loss to the Atlanta Falcons in the first quarter after suffering a concussion. He remained in concussion protocol and was inactive for the Seahawks' 24–13 victory at the 49ers in Week 12. During a Week 16 matchup at the Cowboys, Griffin collected five combined tackles and made his first career sack on Dak Prescott as the Seahawks defeated them 21–12. On December 31, 2017, Griffin recorded six solo tackles, deflected two passes, and made his first career interception during their 26–24 loss to the Arizona Cardinals. His first career interception came in the third quarter off a pass attempt by Drew Stanton intended for Jaron Brown. He finished the 2017 season with 59 combined tackles (50 solo), 15 pass deflections, one interception, and one sack in 15 games and 11 starts.

==== 2018 ====
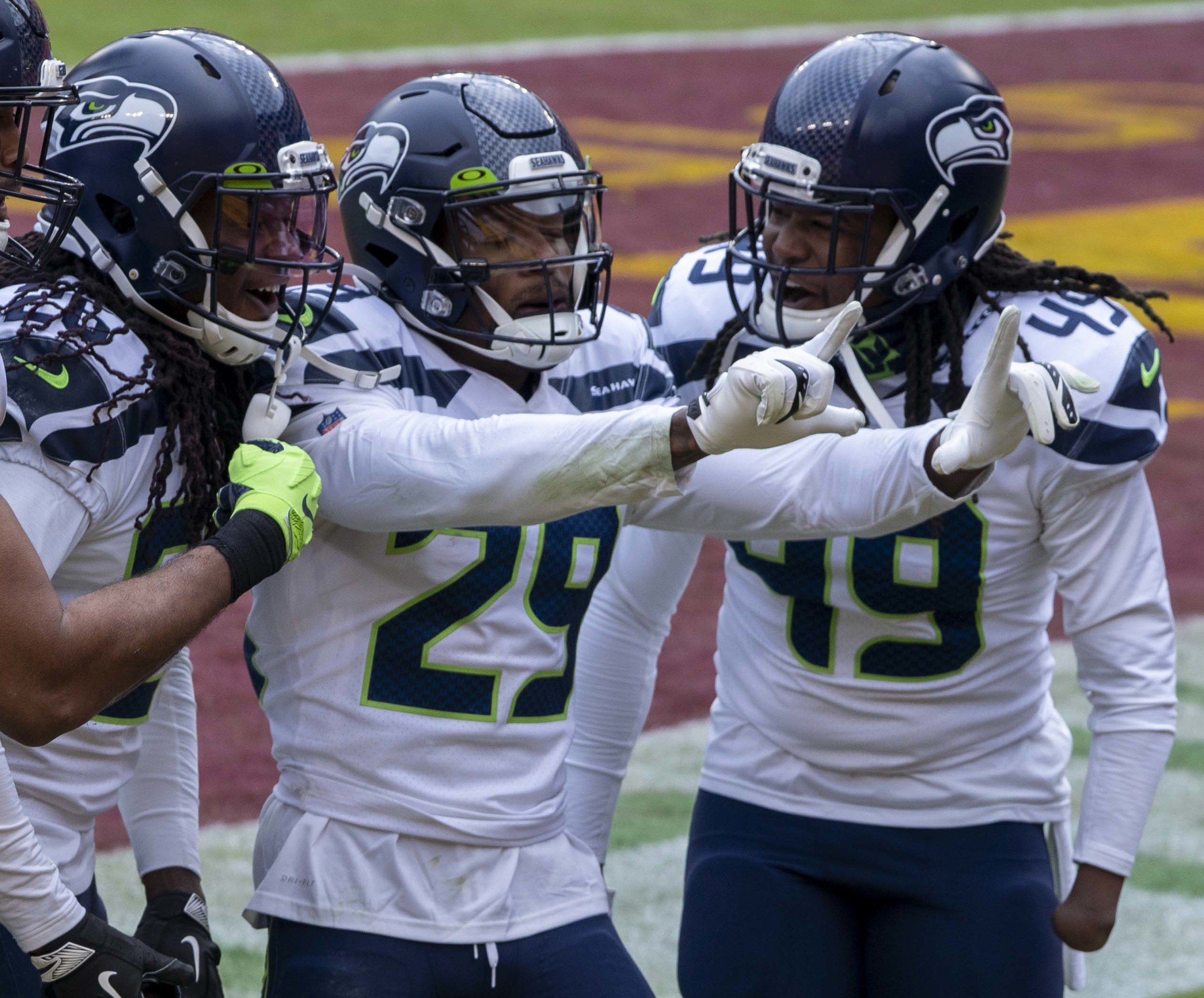
Shaquill Griffin (left) and his brother (right) celebrating an interception with D. J. Reed during a 2020 game at FedExField

Shaquill was reunited with his twin brother Shaquem Griffin in the 2018 season, as Shaquem was drafted by the Seahawks in the fifth round (141st overall) of the 2018 NFL draft on April 28, 2018.

On September 17, 2018, Griffin notched two interceptions and three pass deflections against Chicago Bears quarterback Mitchell Trubisky in a 17–24 road loss at Soldier Field. In the 2018 season, Griffin had 62 total tackles, two interceptions, and eight passes defended in 16 games and starts.

==== 2019 ====
Griffin recorded 65 total tackles and 13 passes defended and 14 games and starts in the 2019 season. He was named to the Pro Bowl on January 17, 2020, as an alternate.

==== 2020 ====
In Week 3 against the Cowboys, Griffin recorded his first interception of the season (and since 2018) off a pass thrown by Dak Prescott during the 38–31 win. In Week 4 against the Miami Dolphins, Griffin recorded another interception, this time thrown by Ryan Fitzpatrick, during the 31–23 win. In Week 15 against the Washington Football Team, Griffin intercepted a pass thrown by Dwayne Haskins during the 20–15 win, setting a single season career high with his third. In the 2020 season, Griffin had 63 total tackles, three interceptions, and 12 passes defended in 12 games and starts.

=== Jacksonville Jaguars ===
On March 17, 2021, Griffin signed a three-year, $44.5 million contract with the Jacksonville Jaguars. In the 2021 season, Griffin had 49 total tackles, seven passes defended, and one forced fumble in 14 games and starts.

On October 26, 2022, Griffin was placed on injured reserve after suffering a back injury in Week 6. He appeared in and started five games. He had 29 total tackles and four passes defended.

On March 8, 2023, Griffin was released by the Jaguars.

=== Houston Texans ===
On May 13, 2023, Griffin signed with the Houston Texans. He was released on November 29, 2023, after 10 games and six starts.

=== Carolina Panthers ===
On November 30, 2023, Griffin was claimed off waivers by the Carolina Panthers.

=== Minnesota Vikings ===
On March 19, 2024, Griffin signed with the Minnesota Vikings.

=== Seattle Seahawks (second stint) ===
On June 25, 2025, Griffin signed a one-year, $3 million contract with the Seattle Seahawks, the team who originally drafted him back in the 2017 NFL draft. He was released on August 27 and re-signed to the practice squad the next day. On September 11, Griffin was signed to the active roster. He was released on September 17, and re-signed to the practice squad. He was promoted to the active roster on November 26. On December 11, Griffin was released and re-signed to the practice squad. On February 8, he won Super Bowl LX with the Seahawks as they defeated the New England Patriots 29-13, but was not elevated from the practice squad for the game and saw no playing time.

== Career statistics ==
Legend
	Won the Super Bowl
**Bold**	Career high

=== NFL ===
==== Regular season ====
Year	Team	Games		Tackles				Interceptions						Fumbles			
Year	Team	GP	GS	Cmb	Solo	Ast	Sck	Int	Yds	Avg	Lng	TD	PD	FF	FR	Yds	TD
2017	SEA	15	11	59	50	9	**1.0**	1	0	0.0	0	0	**15**	0	0	0	0
2018	SEA	16	16	62	**55**	7	0.0	2	8	4.0	8	0	8	0	0	0	0
2019	SEA	14	14	**65**	45	**20**	0.0	0	0	0	0	0	13	0	0	0	0
2020	SEA	12	12	63	53	10	0.0	**3**	20	6.7	16	0	12	0	0	0	0
2021	JAX	14	14	49	36	13	0.0	0	0	0	0	0	7	**1**	0	0	0
2022	JAX	5	5	29	23	6	0.0	0	0	0	0	0	4	0	0	0	0
2023	HOU	10	6	33	24	9	0.0	1	0	0.0	0	0	4	0	0	0	0
2023	CAR	3	1	6	5	1	0.0	0	0	0	0	0	1	0	0	0	0
2024	MIN	17	3	41	33	8	0.0	2	**28**	**14.0**	**28**	0	6	0	0	0	0
2025	SEA	2	1	7	7	0	0.0	0	0	0	0	0	0	0	0	0	0
Career		108	83	414	331	83	1.0	9	56	6.2	28	0	70	1	0	0	0

==== Postseason ====
Year	Team	Games		Tackles				Interceptions						Fumbles			
Year	Team	GP	GS	Cmb	Solo	Ast	Sck	Int	Yds	Avg	Lng	TD	PD	FF	FR	Yds	TD
2018	SEA	1	1	4	4	0	0.0	0	0	0	0	0	**2**	0	0	0	0
2019	SEA	2	2	**7**	**5**	**2**	0.0	0	0	0	0	0	1	0	0	0	0
2020	SEA	1	1	1	1	0	0.0	0	0	0	0	0	0	0	0	0	0
2022	JAX	0	0	Did not play due to injury													
2024	MIN	1	0	1	1	0	0.0	0	0	0	0	0	0	0	0	0	0
Career		5	4	13	11	2	0.0	0	0	0	0	0	3	0	0	0	0

=== College ===
Season	Team	GP	Tackles				Interceptions				
Season	Team	GP	Cmb	Solo	Ast	Sck	Int	Yds	Avg	TD	PD
2013	UCF	4	6	5	1	0.0	0	0	0.0	0	1
2014	UCF	6	15	1	4	0.0	1	20	20.0	0	0
2015	UCF	11	43	**33**	10	0.0	1	**102**	**102.0**	**1**	11
2016	UCF	13	**49**	30	**19**	0.0	**4**	46	11.5	**1**	**15**
Career		34	113	79	34	0.0	6	168	28.0	2	27

== Bibliography ==
- Shaquem Griffin and Shaquill Griffin with Mark Schlabach, Inseparable: How Family and Sacrifice Forged a Path to the NFL. W Publishing Group, 2019. ISBN 978-0-7852-3081-6.
