= 2018 Seattle Seahawks season =

American football team season

- Owner: Paul Allen (until death); The Allen family via the Estate of Paul Allen (after Oct. 15)
- General manager: John Schneider
- Head coach: Pete Carroll
- Offensive coordinator: Brian Schottenheimer
- Defensive coordinator: Ken Norton Jr.
- Home stadium: CenturyLink Field

Results
- Record: 10–6
- Division place: 2nd NFC West
- Playoffs: Lost Wild Card Playoffs (at Cowboys) 22–24
- All-Pros: 3: LB Bobby Wagner (1st team); P Michael Dickson (1st team); LT Duane Brown (2nd team)
- Pro Bowlers: 3: QB Russell Wilson; MLB Bobby Wagner; P Michael Dickson

Uniform
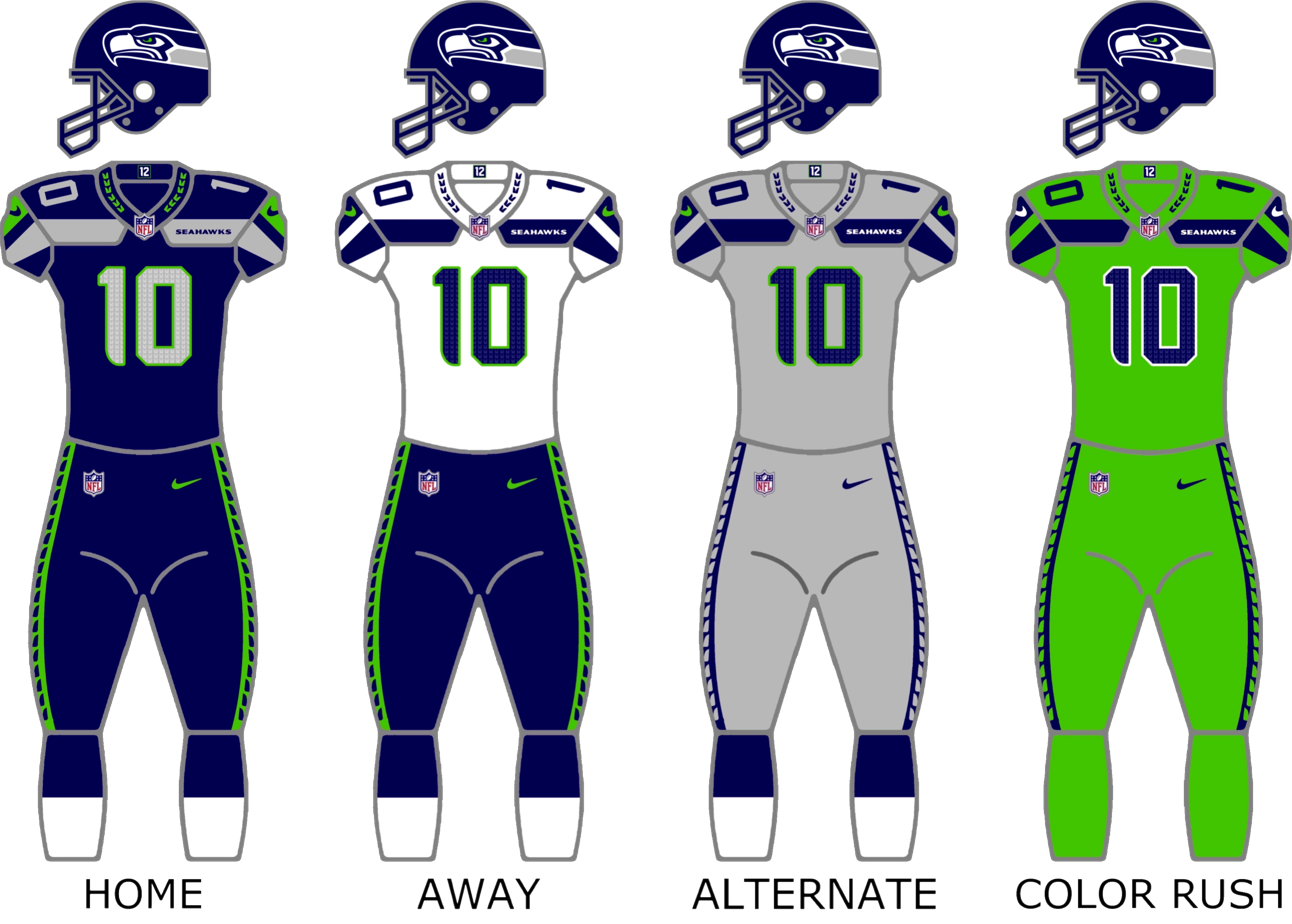

The 2018 season was the Seattle Seahawks' 43rd in the National Football League (NFL) and their ninth under head coach Pete Carroll. The Seahawks improved on their 9–7 record from the 2017 season, finishing 10–6, the sixth time in seven years that they recorded at least ten wins in a season. They also played in London for the first time in franchise history, defeating the Oakland Raiders 27–3 in Week 6. With a win over the Kansas City Chiefs and eventual league MVP Patrick Mahomes in Week 16, the Seahawks returned to the playoffs; their seventh appearance in the nine seasons under Carroll. However, the Seahawks suffered their first one-and-done postseason campaign since 2004, as they fell to the Dallas Cowboys in the Wild Card round 24–22.

This was the first season since 2011 that the team did not feature the original Legion of Boom defensive unit and did not have Richard Sherman on the roster, as he was released on March 9 and signed with division rival San Francisco 49ers. Michael Bennett, another longtime Seahawk, was traded to the Philadelphia Eagles on March 7. His fellow defensive lineman Cliff Avril was released by the team on May 4. It was also the first season since 2009 that Kam Chancellor was not on the roster; he announced his retirement on July 1 due to the neck injury he sustained in Week 10 of the previous season.

Tight ends Jimmy Graham and Luke Willson, wide receiver Paul Richardson, and running back Thomas Rawls all departed in free agency as well.

On August 20, longtime Seahawks punter Jon Ryan was released from the team. He was the last remaining player from the team before coach Pete Carroll took over in 2010. With his release, the Seahawks shifted the punting duties to their fifth-round rookie Michael Dickson, who went on to make the Pro Bowl and was named First-team All-Pro.

This season is notable for featuring the NFL's first player with only one hand, as the Seahawks drafted Shaquem Griffin in the fifth-round of the 2018 NFL draft out of the University of Central Florida. He is the twin brother of Seahawks cornerback Shaquill Griffin.

Microsoft co-founder Paul Allen, who had owned the team since 1997, died of Hodgkin's lymphoma on October 15, at the age of 65. Allen also owned the NBA's Portland Trail Blazers from 1988 until his death in 2018. In tribute, the team wore patches labeled "PGA" (Allen's initials) for the rest of the season beginning at the game against the Detroit Lions.

== Draft ==
2018 Seattle Seahawks draft
Round	Selection	Player	Position	College	Notes
1	27	Rashaad Penny	RB	San Diego State	From Green Bay
3	79	Rasheem Green	DE	USC	From Green Bay
4	120	Will Dissly	TE	Washington	
5	141	Shaquem Griffin	LB	UCF	From Houston
5	146	Tre Flowers	CB	Oklahoma State	From Oakland
5	149	Michael Dickson	P	Texas	From Denver
5	168	Jamarco Jones	OT	Ohio State	From New England
6	186	Jacob Martin	DE	Temple	From Green Bay
7	220	Alex McGough	QB	FIU	From Pittsburgh

Draft trades

- The Seahawks traded their second- and seventh-round selections (49th and 235th overall) and wide receiver Jermaine Kearse to the New York Jets for the Jets' seventh-round selection (226th overall) and defensive end Sheldon Richardson.
- The Seahawks traded their third-round selection (80th overall) and their second-round selection in 2019 to Houston for Houston's fifth-round selection (141st overall) and offensive tackle Duane Brown.
- The Seahawks traded their sixth-round selection (192nd overall) and running back Marshawn Lynch to Oakland for Oakland's fifth-round selection (146th overall).
- The Seahawks traded their fifth-round selection (156th overall) to Philadelphia for Philadelphia's seventh-round selection (250th overall) and offensive tackle Matt Tobin.
- The Seahawks traded defensive end Cassius Marsh to New England for New England's fifth- and seventh-round selections (168th and 250th overall).
- The Seahawks traded cornerback Tramaine Brock to Minnesota for Minnesota's seventh-round selection (248th overall).
- The Seahawks traded their seventh-round selection (256th overall) to New England for cornerback Justin Coleman.

== Staff ==
2018 Seattle Seahawks staff
Front office: Owner – Estate of Paul Allen; President – Chuck Arnold; Executive vice president/general manager – John Schneider; Vice president of football administration – Matt Thomas; Co-director of player personnel – Scott Fitterer; Co-director of player personnel – Trent Kirchner; Director of college scouting – Matt Berry; Director of pro personnel – Nolan Teasley; Head coaches: Head coach/executive vice president of football operations – Pete Carroll; Assistant head coach/defensive – Clint Hurtt; Associate head coach – Carl Smith; Offensive coaches: Offensive coordinator – Brian Schottenheimer; Quarterbacks – Dave Canales; Assistant quarterbacks – Will Harriger; Running backs – Chad Morton; Wide receivers – Nate Carroll; Tight ends – Pat McPherson; Offensive line – Mike Solari; Assistant offensive line – Pat Ruel; Assistant offensive line – Brennan Carroll; Offensive assistant – Steve Shimko	Defensive coaches: Defensive coordinator – Ken Norton Jr.; Passing game coordinator – Andre Curtis; Assistant defensive line – Jethro Franklin; Linebackers – John Glenn; Secondary – Nick Sorensen; Defensive quality control – Tom Donatell; Special teams coaches: Special teams coordinator – Brian Schneider; Assistant special teams – Larry Izzo; Strength and conditioning: Head strength and conditioning – Chris Carlisle; Assistant strength and conditioning – Mondray Gee; Assistant strength and conditioning – Jamie Yancher

== Final roster ==
2018 Seattle Seahawks roster
Quarterbacks (QB): 7 Brett Hundley; 3 Russell Wilson; Running backs (RB): 32 Chris Carson; 27 Mike Davis; 38 Tre Madden FB; 21 J. D. McKissic; 20 Rashaad Penny; 40 Bo Scarbrough; Wide receivers (WR): 89 Doug Baldwin; 18 Jaron Brown; 16 Tyler Lockett; 83 David Moore; Tight ends (TE): 84 Ed Dickson; 81 Nick Vannett	Offensive linemen (OL): 68 Justin Britt C; 76 Duane Brown T; 74 George Fant T; 78 D. J. Fluker G; 53 Joey Hunt C; 65 Germain Ifedi T; 75 Elijah Nkansah T; 77 Ethan Pocic G; 64 J. R. Sweezy G; Defensive linemen (DL): 55 Frank Clark DE; 97 Poona Ford DT; 94 Rasheem Green DE; 93 Branden Jackson DE; 99 Quinton Jefferson DE; 92 Nazair Jones DT; 95 Dion Jordan DE; 90 Jarran Reed DT; 98 Shamar Stephen DT	Linebackers (LB): 58 Austin Calitro OLB; 52 Emmanuel Ellerbee MLB; 49 Shaquem Griffin OLB; 59 Jacob Martin OLB; 51 Barkevious Mingo OLB; 54 Bobby Wagner MLB; 50 K. J. Wright OLB; Defensive backs (DB): 35 Maurice Alexander SS; 28 Justin Coleman CB; 37 Tre Flowers CB; 26 Shaquill Griffin CB; 42 Lano Hill SS; 36 Akeem King CB; 24 Shalom Luani FS; 30 Bradley McDougald SS; 39 Kalan Reed CB; 33 Tedric Thompson FS; 23 Neiko Thorpe CB; Special teams (ST): 4 Michael Dickson P; 11 Sebastian Janikowski K; 69 Tyler Ott LS	Practice squad: 1 Jeremy Boykins CB; 47 Justin Currie OLB; 62 Marcus Henry C; 5 Alex McGough QB; 19 Keenan Reynolds WR; 72 Jordan Roos G; 10 Caleb Scott WR; 46 Tyrone Swoopes TE; 34 Simeon Thomas CB; 17 Malik Turner WR; Reserve: 61 Ricky Ali'ifua DE (IR); 43 Emmanuel Beal LB (IR); 31 Kam Chancellor SS (PUP); 82 Amara Darboh WR (IR); 88 Will Dissly TE (IR); 73 Jamarco Jones T (IR); 56 Mychal Kendricks OLB (IR); 94 Malik McDowell DT (NF-Inj.); 38 Tevon Mutcherson FS (IR); 22 C. J. Prosise RB (IR); 66 Jordan Simmons G (IR); 29 Earl Thomas FS (IR); Rookies in italics 53 active, 12 reserve, 10 practice squad

=== Notable departures ===
Notable Departures
CB	Richard Sherman	Released
CB	DeShawn Shead	Released
CB	Byron Maxwell	Released
CB	Jeremy Lane	Released
SS	Kam Chancellor	Retired
DE	Michael Bennett	Traded
DE	Cliff Avril	Released
DT	Sheldon Richardson	Free agent
TE	Jimmy Graham	Free agent
TE	Luke Willson	Free agent
WR	Paul Richardson	Free agent
OT	Rees Odhiambo	Released
RB	Thomas Rawls	Free agent
P	Jon Ryan	Released

== Preseason ==
Week	Date	Opponent	Result	Record	Venue	Recap
1	August 9	Indianapolis Colts	L 17–19	0–1	CenturyLink Field	Recap
2	August 18	at Los Angeles Chargers	L 14–24	0–2	StubHub Center	Recap
3	August 24	at Minnesota Vikings	L 20–21	0–3	U.S. Bank Stadium	Recap
4	August 30	Oakland Raiders	L 19–30	0–4	CenturyLink Field	Recap

== Regular season ==
=== Schedule ===
On January 11, 2018, the NFL announced that the Seahawks will play the Oakland Raiders in a London Game in London, England, with the Raiders serving as the home team. The game site, originally slated for Tottenham Hotspur Stadium, was later moved to Wembley Stadium. The game, which was the Seahawks' first appearance in the International Series, occurred during Week 6 on October 14. The network time was announced in conjunction with the release of the 2018 regular season schedule.

The remainder of the Seahawks' 2018 schedule, with exact dates and times, was announced on April 19.

Divisional matchups: the NFC West played the NFC North and the AFC West.

Week	Date	Opponent	Result	Record	Venue	Recap
1	September 9	at Denver Broncos	**L** 24–27	0–1	Broncos Stadium at Mile High	Recap
2	September 17	at Chicago Bears	**L** 17–24	0–2	Soldier Field	Recap
3	September 23	Dallas Cowboys	**W** 24–13	1–2	CenturyLink Field	Recap
4	September 30	at **Arizona Cardinals**	**W** 20–17	2–2	State Farm Stadium	Recap
5	October 7	**Los Angeles Rams**	**L** 31–33	2–3	CenturyLink Field	Recap
6	October 14	at Oakland Raiders	**W** 27–3	3–3	(United Kingdom) Wembley Stadium (London)	Recap
7	Bye					
8	October 28	at Detroit Lions	**W** 28–14	4–3	Ford Field	Recap
9	November 4	Los Angeles Chargers	**L** 17–25	4–4	CenturyLink Field	Recap
10	November 11	at **Los Angeles Rams**	**L** 31–36	4–5	Los Angeles Memorial Coliseum	Recap
11	November 15	Green Bay Packers	**W** 27–24	5–5	CenturyLink Field	Recap
12	November 25	at Carolina Panthers	**W** 30–27	6–5	Bank of America Stadium	Recap
13	December 2	**San Francisco 49ers**	**W** 43–16	7–5	CenturyLink Field	Recap
14	December 10	Minnesota Vikings	**W** 21–7	8–5	CenturyLink Field	Recap
15	December 16	at **San Francisco 49ers**	**L** 23–26 (OT)	8–6	Levi's Stadium	Recap
16	December 23	Kansas City Chiefs	**W** 38–31	9–6	CenturyLink Field	Recap
17	December 30	**Arizona Cardinals**	**W** 27–24	10–6	CenturyLink Field	Recap

Note: Intra-division opponents are in bold text.

=== Game summaries ===
==== Week 1: at Denver Broncos ====
Week One: Seattle Seahawks at Denver Broncos – Game summary

Quarter	1	2	3	4	Total
Seahawks	7	3	7	7	**24**
**Broncos**	7	10	3	7	**27**

at Broncos Stadium at Mile High, Denver, Colorado

- Date: September 9
- Game time: 2:25 p.m. MDT/1:25 p.m. PDT
- Game weather: 84 °F (29 °C), sunny
- Game attendance: 76,761
- Referee: Brad Allen
- TV announcers (Fox): Dick Stockton, Mark Schlereth and Jennifer Hale
- Recap, Gamebook

Game information

**First quarter**

- SEA – Will Dissly 15-yard pass from Russell Wilson (Sebastian Janikowski kick), 9:04. Seahawks 7–0. **Drive: 1 play, 15 yards, 0:06.**
- DEN – Phillip Lindsay 29-yard pass from Case Keenum (Brandon McManus kick), 6:10. Tied 7–7. **Drive: 7 plays, 75 yards, 2:54.**

**Second quarter**

- SEA – Sebastian Janikowski 35-yard field goal, 13:59. Seahawks 10–7. **Drive: 6 plays, 78 yards, 1:46.**
- DEN – Emmanuel Sanders 43-yard pass from Case Keenum (Brandon McManus kick), 10:29. Broncos 14–10. **Drive: 6 plays, 75 yards, 3:30.**
- DEN – Brandon McManus 51-yard field goal, 5:25. Broncos 17–10. **Drive: 6 plays, 30 yards, 2:33.**

**Third quarter**

- SEA – Brandon Marshall 20-yard pass from Russell Wilson (Sebastian Janikowski kick), 6:02. Tied 17–17. **Drive: 5 plays, 41 yards, 1:56.**
- DEN – Brandon McManus 53-yard field goal, 2:01. Broncos 20–17. **Drive: 4 plays, 0 yards, 0:54.**

**Fourth quarter**

- SEA – Tyler Lockett 51-yard pass from Russell Wilson (Sebastian Janikowski kick), 14:46. Seahawks 24–20. **Drive: 7 plays, 75 yards, 2:15.**
- DEN – Demaryius Thomas 4-yard pass from Case Keenum (Brandon McManus kick), 11:11. Broncos 27–24. **Drive: 7 plays, 75 yards, 3:35.**

**Top passers**

- SEA – Russell Wilson – 19/33, 298 yards, 3 TD, 2 INT
- DEN – Case Keenum – 25/39, 329 yards, 3 TD, 3 INT

**Top rushers**

- SEA – Chris Carson – 7 carries, 51 yards
- DEN – Philip Lindsay – 15 carries, 71 yards

**Top receivers**

- SEA – Will Dissly – 3 receptions, 105 yards, TD
- DEN – Emmanuel Sanders – 10 receptions, 135 yards, TD

With the loss, the Seahawks fell to 0-1 (0-1 on the road & against the AFC West). This would be Seattle's last loss to Denver until 2026.

==== Week 2: at Chicago Bears ====
Week Two: Seattle Seahawks at Chicago Bears – Game summary

Quarter	1	2	3	4	Total
Seahawks	0	3	0	14	**17**
**Bears**	7	3	0	14	**24**

at Soldier Field, Chicago, Illinois

- Date: September 17
- Game time: 7:15 p.m. CDT/5:15 p.m. PDT
- Game weather: 79 °F (26 °C), clear
- Game attendance: 57,960
- Referee: Walt Coleman
- TV announcers (ESPN/KIRO): Joe Tessitore, Jason Witten, Booger McFarland and Lisa Salters
- Recap, Gamebook

Game information

**First quarter**

- CHI – Trey Burton 3-yard pass from Mitchell Trubisky (Cody Parkey kick), 4:55. Bears 7–0. **Drive: 10 plays, 96 yards, 5:40.**

**Second quarter**

- CHI – Cody Parkey 25-yard field goal, 1:07. Bears 10–0. **Drive: 12 plays, 44 yards, 5:26.**
- SEA – Sebastian Janikowski 56-yard field goal, 0:00. Bears 10–3. **Drive: 8 plays, 37 yards, 1:07.**

**Third quarter**

- No scoring plays.

**Fourth quarter**

- CHI – Anthony Miller 10-yard pass from Mitchell Trubisky (Cody Parkey kick), 14:15. Bears 17–3. **Drive: 11 plays, 66 yards, 6:15.**
- SEA – Tyler Lockett 19-yard pass from Russell Wilson (Sebastian Janikowski kick), 10:13. Bears 17–10. **Drive: 10 plays, 75 yards, 4:02.**
- CHI – Prince Amukamara 49-yard interception return (Cody Parkey kick), 6:37. Bears 24–10.
- SEA – Will Dissly 2-yard pass from Russell Wilson (Sebastian Janikowski kick), 0:14. Bears 24–17. **Drive: 11 plays, 99 yards, 2:28.**

**Top passers**

- SEA – Russell Wilson – 22/36, 226 yards, 2 TD, INT
- CHI – Mitchell Trubisky – 25/34, 200 yards, 2 TD, 2 INT

**Top rushers**

- SEA – Rashaad Penny – 10 carries, 30 yards
- CHI – Jordan Howard – 14 carries, 35 yards

**Top receivers**

- SEA – Tyler Lockett – 5 receptions, 60 yards, TD
- CHI – Allen Robinson – 10 receptions, 83 yards

==== Week 3: vs. Dallas Cowboys ====
Week Three: Dallas Cowboys at Seattle Seahawks – Game summary

Quarter	1	2	3	4	Total
Cowboys	0	3	3	7	**13**
**Seahawks**	0	17	0	7	**24**

at CenturyLink Field, Seattle, Washington

- Date: September 23
- Game time: 1:25 p.m. PDT
- Game weather: 61 °F (16 °C), sunny
- Game attendance: 69,047
- Referee: Carl Cheffers
- TV announcers (Fox): Joe Buck, Troy Aikman and Erin Andrews
- Recap, Gamebook

Game information

**First quarter**

- No scoring plays.

**Second quarter**

- SEA – Jaron Brown 16-yard pass from Russell Wilson (Sebastian Janikowski kick), 9:28. Seahawks 7–0. **Drive: 10 plays, 64 yards, 3:52.**
- DAL – Brett Maher 50-yard field goal, 5:26. Seahawks 7–3. **Drive: 8 plays, 48 yards, 4:02.**
- SEA – Tyler Lockett 52-yard pass from Russell Wilson (Sebastian Janikowski kick), 1:52. Seahawks 14–3. **Drive: 7 plays, 75 yards, 3:34.**
- SEA – Sebastian Janikowski 47-yard field goal, 0:00. Seahawks 17–3. **Drive: 6 plays, 29 yards, 0:49.**

**Third quarter**

- DAL – Brett Maher 35-yard field goal, 3:43. Seahawks 17–6. **Drive: 9 plays, 54 yards, 5:17.**

**Fourth quarter**

- SEA – Chris Carson 5-yard run (Sebastian Janikowski kick), 12:54. Seahawks 24–6. **Drive: 10 plays, 72 yards, 5:49.**
- DAL – Tavon Austin 3-yard pass from Dak Prescott (Brett Maher kick), 7:11. Seahawks 24–13. **Drive: 5 plays, 57 yards, 1:32.**

**Top passers**

- DAL – Dak Prescott – 19/34, 168 yards, TD, 2 INT
- SEA – Russell Wilson – 16/26, 192 yards, 2 TD

**Top rushers**

- DAL – Ezekiel Elliott – 16 carries, 127 yards
- SEA – Chris Carson – 32 carries, 102 yards, TD

**Top receivers**

- DAL – Geoff Swaim – 5 receptions, 47 yards
- SEA – Tyler Lockett – 4 receptions, 77 yards, TD

==== Week 4: at Arizona Cardinals ====
Week Four: Seattle Seahawks at Arizona Cardinals – Game summary

Quarter	1	2	3	4	Total
**Seahawks**	7	0	10	3	**20**
Cardinals	0	10	0	7	**17**

at State Farm Stadium, Glendale, Arizona

- Date: September 30
- Game time: 1:05 p.m. MST & PDT
- Game weather: Played indoors (retractable roof closed)
- Game attendance: 61,845
- Referee: John Hussey
- TV announcers (Fox): Dick Stockton, Mark Schlereth and Jennifer Hale
- Recap, Gamebook

Game information

**First quarter**

- SEA – Mike Davis 20-yard run (Sebastian Janikowski kick), 6:09. Seahawks 7–0. **Drive: 6 plays, 62 yards, 2:57.**

**Second quarter**

- ARI – Phil Dawson 23-yard field goal, 14:04. Seahawks 7–3. **Drive: 13 plays, 68 yards, 5:30.**
- ARI – David Johnson 1-yard run (Phil Dawson kick), 1:52. Cardinals 10–7. **Drive: 6 plays, 58 yards, 3:32.**

**Third quarter**

- SEA – Sebastian Janikowski 40-yard field goal, 4:59. Tied 10–10. **Drive: 14 plays, 57 yards, 7:46.**
- SEA – Mike Davis 1-yard run (Sebastian Janikowski kick), 1:00. Seahawks 17–10. **Drive: 5 plays, 47 yards, 2:19.**

**Fourth quarter**

- ARI – Chad Williams 22-yard pass from Josh Rosen (Phil Dawson kick), 8:59. Tied 17–17. **Drive: 5 plays, 80 yards, 2:39.**
- SEA – Sebastian Janikowski 52-yard field goal, 0:00. Seahawks 20–17. **Drive: 7 plays, 31 yards, 1:50.**

**Top passers**

- SEA – Russell Wilson – 19/26, 172 yards
- ARI – Josh Rosen – 15/27, 180 yards, TD

**Top rushers**

- SEA – Mike Davis – 21 carries, 101 yards, 2 TD
- ARI – David Johnson – 22 carries, 71 yards, TD

**Top receivers**

- SEA – Tyler Lockett – 5 receptions, 53 yards
- ARI – Christian Kirk – 4 receptions, 28 yards

==== Week 5: vs. Los Angeles Rams ====
Week Five: Los Angeles Rams at Seattle Seahawks – Game summary

Quarter	1	2	3	4	Total
**Rams**	7	10	7	9	**33**
Seahawks	7	10	14	0	**31**

at CenturyLink Field, Seattle, Washington

- Date: October 7
- Game time: 1:25 p.m. PDT
- Game weather: 53 °F (12 °C), rain
- Game attendance: 68,893
- Referee: Clete Blakeman
- TV announcers (Fox): Sam Rosen, Ronde Barber and Joy Taylor
- Recap, Gamebook

Game information

**First quarter**

- SEA – Mike Davis 6-yard run (Sebastian Janikowski kick), 4:30. Seahawks 7–0. **Drive: 9 plays, 74 yards, 5:45.**
- LAR – Todd Gurley 2-yard run (Cairo Santos kick), 2:00. Tied 7–7. **Drive: 5 plays, 58 yards, 2:30.**

**Second quarter**

- LAR – Cairo Santos 19-yard field goal, 11:13. Rams 10–7. **Drive: 8 plays, 79 yards, 3:35.**
- SEA – Tyler Lockett 39-yard pass from Russell Wilson (Sebastian Janikowski kick), 9:11. Seahawks 14–10. **Drive: 4 plays, 50 yards, 2:02.**
- LAR – Cooper Kupp 6-yard pass from Jared Goff (Cairo Santos kick), 6:02. Rams 17–14. **Drive: 8 plays, 70 yards, 3:09.**
- SEA – Sebastian Janikowski 52-yard field goal, 1:55. Tied 17–17. **Drive: 8 plays, 27 yards, 4:07.**

**Third quarter**

- SEA – David Moore 3-yard pass from Russell Wilson (Sebastian Janikowski kick), 10:34. Seahawks 24–17. **Drive: 9 plays, 75 yards, 4:26.**
- LAR – Todd Gurley 2-yard run (Cairo Santos kick), 5:04. Tied 24–24. **Drive: 9 plays, 64 yards, 5:30.**
- SEA – David Moore 30-yard pass from Russell Wilson (Sebastian Janikowski kick), 1:35. Seahawks 31–24. **Drive: 7 plays, 75 yards, 3:29.**

**Fourth quarter**

- LAR – Todd Gurley 5-yard run (failed kick), 14:54. Seahawks 31–30. **Drive: 5 plays, 74 yards, 1:41.**
- LAR – Cairo Santos 39-yard field goal, 6:05. Rams 33–31. **Drive: 9 plays, 61 yards, 4:29.**

**Top passers**

- LAR – Jared Goff – 23/32, 321 yards, TD, 2 INT
- SEA – Russell Wilson – 13/21, 198 yards, 3 TD

**Top rushers**

- LAR – Todd Gurley – 22 carries, 77 yards, 3 TD
- SEA – Chris Carson – 19 carries, 116 yards

**Top receivers**

- LAR – Cooper Kupp – 6 receptions, 90 yards, TD
- SEA – Tyler Lockett – 3 receptions, 98 yards, TD

==== Week 6: at Oakland Raiders ====
NFL London Games

Week Six: Seattle Seahawks at Oakland Raiders – Game summary

Quarter	1	2	3	4	Total
**Seahawks**	7	10	3	7	**27**
Raiders	0	0	0	3	**3**

at Wembley Stadium, London, England

- Date: October 14
- Game time: 6:00 p.m. BST/10:00 a.m. PDT
- Game weather: 52 °F (11 °C), cloudy
- Game attendance: 84,922
- Referee: Pete Morelli
- TV announcers (Fox): Chris Myers, Daryl Johnston and Laura Okmin
- Recap, Gamebook

Game information

**First quarter**

- SEA – Jaron Brown 5-yard pass from Russell Wilson (Sebastian Janikowski kick), 7:24. Seahawks 7–0. **Drive: 14 plays, 82 yards, 7:36.**

**Second quarter**

- SEA – David Moore 19-yard pass from Russell Wilson (Sebastian Janikowski kick), 14:10. Seahawks 14–0. **Drive: 3 plays, 24 yards, 1:14.**
- SEA – Sebastian Janikowski 44-yard field goal, 0:00. Seahawks 17–0. **Drive: 5 plays, 33 yards, 0:39.**

**Third quarter**

- SEA – Sebastian Janikowski 26-yard field goal, 11:42. Seahawks 20–0. **Drive: 4 plays, 3 yards, 1:56.**

**Fourth quarter**

- SEA – Tyler Lockett 10-yard pass from Russell Wilson (Sebastian Janikowski kick), 14:55. Seahawks 27–0. **Drive: 8 plays, 62 yards, 3:36.**
- OAK – Matt McCrane 43-yard field goal, 8:25. Seahawks 27–3. **Drive: 12 plays, 51 yards, 6:30.**

**Top passers**

- SEA – Russell Wilson – 17/23, 222 yards, 3 TD, INT
- OAK – Derek Carr – 23/31, 142 yards

**Top rushers**

- SEA – Chris Carson – 14 carries, 59 yards
- OAK – Marshawn Lynch – 13 carries, 45 yards

**Top receivers**

- SEA – Doug Baldwin – 6 receptions, 91 yards
- OAK – Jalen Richard – 7 receptions, 48 yards

With the win, head coach Pete Carroll became the Seahawks' all-time wins leader (including postseason) passing Mike Holmgren with a record of 91–56–1 at that point.

==== Week 8: at Detroit Lions ====
Week Eight: Seattle Seahawks at Detroit Lions – Game summary

Quarter	1	2	3	4	Total
**Seahawks**	0	21	0	7	**28**
Lions	7	0	0	7	**14**

at Ford Field, Detroit, Michigan

- Date: October 28
- Game time: 1:00 p.m. EDT/10:00 a.m. PDT
- Game weather: Played indoors (dome stadium)
- Game attendance: 65,237
- Referee: Walt Anderson
- TV announcers (Fox): Kevin Kugler, Chris Spielman, Ronde Barber and Shannon Spake
- Recap, Gamebook

Game information

**First quarter**

- DET - Marvin Jones Jr. 39 yard pass from Matthew Stafford (Matt Prater kick), 2:15. **Drive 13 plays, 91 yards, 6:53.** Lions 7–0.

**Second quarter**

- SEA - Tyler Lockett 24 yard pass from Russell Wilson (Sebastian Janikowski kick), 14:15. **Drive:7 plays, 75 yards, 3:00.** Tied 7–7.
- SEA - David Moore 15 yard pass from Russell Wilson (Sebastian Janikowski kick), 12:42. **Drive: 3 plays, 34 yards, 1:22.** Seahawks 14–7.
- SEA - Ed Dickson 12 yard pass from Russell Wilson (Sebastian Janikowski kick), 2:28. **Drive: 12 plays, 80 yards, 7:16.** Seahawks 21–7.

**Third quarter**

- No scoring

**Fourth quarter**

- SEA - Chris Carson 7 yard run (Sebastian Janikowski kick), 14:23. **Drive: 7 plays, 75 yards, 3:53.** Seahawks 28–7.
- DET - Marvin Jones Jr. 19 yard pass from Matthew Stafford (Matt Prater kick), 10:40. **Drive: 10 plays, 85 yards, 3:43.** Seahawks 28–14.

**Top passers**

- SEA – Russell Wilson - 14/17, 247 yards, 3 TD
- DET – Matthew Stafford - 27/40, 310 yards, 2 TD, INT

**Top rushers**

- SEA – Chris Carson - 25 carries, 105 yards, TD
- DET – Kerryon Johnson - 8 carries, 22 yards

**Top receivers**

- SEA – David Moore - 4 receptions, 97 yards, TD
- DET – Marvin Jones Jr. - 7 receptions 117 yards, 2 TD

==== Week 9: vs. Los Angeles Chargers ====
Week Nine: Los Angeles Chargers at Seattle Seahawks – Game summary

Quarter	1	2	3	4	Total
**Chargers**	6	13	0	6	**25**
Seahawks	7	3	0	7	**17**

at CenturyLink Field, Seattle, Washington

- Date: November 4
- Game time: 1:05 p.m. PST
- Game weather: 56 °F (13 °C), sunny
- Game attendance: 68,989
- Referee: Shawn Hochuli
- TV announcers (CBS): Kevin Harlan, Rich Gannon, and Steve Tasker
- Recap, Gamebook

Game information

**First quarter**

- SEA – Jaron Brown 10-yard pass from Russell Wilson (Sebastian Janikowski kick), 6:55. Seahawks 7–0. **Drive: 13 plays, 75 yards, 8:05.**
- LAC – Tyrell Williams 12-yard pass from Philip Rivers (kick failed), 0:00. Seahawks 7–6. **Drive: 10 plays, 94 yards, 6:55.**

**Second quarter**

- LAC – Melvin Gordon 34-yard run (pass failed), 11:36. Chargers 12–7. **Drive: 4 plays, 84 yards, 1:04.**
- LAC – Mike Williams 30-yard pass from Philip Rivers (Caleb Sturgis kick), 1:10. Chargers 19–7. **Drive: 5 plays, 65 yards, 0:55.**
- SEA – Sebastian Janikowski 44-yard field goal, 0:00. Chargers 19–10. **Drive: 8 plays, 49 yards, 1:10.**

**Third quarter**

- No scoring plays.

**Fourth quarter**

- LAC – Desmond King 42-yard interception return (kick failed), 6:44. Chargers 25–10.
- SEA – Nick Vannett 6-yard pass from Russell Wilson (Sebastian Janikowski kick), 1:50. Chargers 25–17. **Drive: 14 plays, 54 yards, 4:54.**

**Top passers**

- LAC – Philip Rivers – 13/26, 228 yards, 2 TD
- SEA – Russell Wilson – 26/39, 235 yards, 2 TD, INT

**Top rushers**

- LAC – Melvin Gordon – 16 carries, 113 yards, TD
- SEA – Mike Davis – 15 carries, 62 yards

**Top receivers**

- LAC – Keenan Allen – 6 receptions, 124 yards
- SEA – Doug Baldwin – 4 receptions, 77 yards

==== Week 10: at Los Angeles Rams ====
Week Ten: Seattle Seahawks at Los Angeles Rams – Game summary

Quarter	1	2	3	4	Total
Seahawks	14	0	7	10	**31**
**Rams**	7	10	3	16	**36**

at Los Angeles Memorial Coliseum, Los Angeles, California

- Date: November 11
- Game time: 1:25 p.m. PST
- Game weather: 75 °F (24 °C), sunny
- Game attendance: 72,755
- Referee: John Hussey
- TV announcers (CBS): Jim Nantz, Tony Romo and Tracy Wolfson
- Recap, Gamebook

Game information

**First quarter**

- SEA – Nick Vannett 8-yard pass from Russell Wilson (Sebastian Janikowski kick), 11:16. Seahawks 7–0. **Drive: 7 plays, 75 yards, 3:44.**
- LAR – Gerald Everett 10-yard pass from Jared Goff (Greg Zuerlein kick), 6:41. Tied 7–7. **Drive: 10 plays, 86 yards, 4:35.**
- SEA – Rashaad Penny 18-yard run (Sebastian Janikowski kick), 3:42. Seahawks 14–7. **Drive: 5 plays, 75 yards, 2:59.**

**Second quarter**

- LAR – Greg Zuerlein 35-yard field goal, 14:48. Seahawks 14–10. **Drive: 9 plays, 58 yards, 3:54.**
- LAR – Todd Gurley 17-yard run (Greg Zuerlein kick), 2:48. Rams 17–14. **Drive: 9 plays, 86 yards, 4:43.**

**Third quarter**

- LAR – Greg Zuerlein 37-yard field goal, 9:44. Rams 20–14. **Drive: 10 plays, 56 yards, 5:16.**
- SEA – Tyler Lockett 23-yard pass from Russell Wilson (Sebastian Janikowski kick), 4:20. Seahawks 21–20. **Drive: 9 plays, 75 yards, 5:24.**

**Fourth quarter**

- LAR – Tyler Higbee 10-yard pass from Jared Goff (run failed), 14:54. Rams 26–21. **Drive: 9 plays, 75 yards, 4:26.**
- SEA – Sebastian Janikowski 33-yard field goal, 9:52. Rams 26–24. **Drive: 9 plays, 60 yards, 5:02.**
- LAR – Greg Zuerlein 20-yard field goal, 7:34. Rams 29–24. **Drive: 7 plays, 44 yards, 2:18.**
- LAR – Brandin Cooks 9-yard run (Greg Zuerlein kick), 5:49. Rams 36–24. **Drive: 1 plays, 9 yards, 0:06.**
- SEA – Mike Davis 3-yard pass from Russell Wilson (Sebastian Janikowski kick), 1:56. Rams 36–31. **Drive: 12 plays, 90 yards, 3:53.**

**Top passers**

- SEA – Russell Wilson – 17/26, 176 yards, 3 TD
- LAR – Jared Goff – 28/39, 318 yards, 2 TD

**Top rushers**

- SEA – Rashaad Penny – 12 carries, 108 yards, TD
- LAR – Todd Gurley – 16 carries, 120 yards, TD

**Top receivers**

- SEA – Tyler Lockett – 5 receptions, 67 yards, TD
- LAR – Brandin Cooks – 10 receptions, 100 yards

The Seahawks were swept by the Rams for the first time since 2015.

==== Week 11: vs. Green Bay Packers ====
Week Eleven: Green Bay Packers at Seattle Seahawks – Game summary

Quarter	1	2	3	4	Total
Packers	14	7	0	3	**24**
**Seahawks**	3	14	0	10	**27**

at CenturyLink Field, Seattle, Washington

- Date: November 15
- Game time: 5:20 p.m. PST
- Game weather: 54 °F (12 °C), partly cloudy
- Game attendance: 69,007
- Referee: Tony Corrente
- TV announcers (Fox/NFLN): Joe Buck, Troy Aikman, Erin Andrews and Kristina Pink
- Recap, Gamebook

Game information

**First quarter**

- GB – Aaron Jones 8-yard run (Mason Crosby kick), 13:46. Packers 7–0. **Drive: 3 plays, 29 yards, 1:07.**
- SEA – Sebastian Janikowski 39-yard field goal, 6:00. Packers 7–3. **Drive: 9 plays, 52 yards, 4:46.**
- GB – Robert Tonyan 54-yard pass from Aaron Rodgers (Mason Crosby kick), 3:10. Packers 14–3. **Drive: 6 plays, 75 yards, 2:50.**

**Second quarter**

- SEA – Doug Baldwin 6-yard pass from Russell Wilson (Sebastian Janikowski kick), 8:03. Packers 14–10. **Drive: 14 plays, 85 yards, 7:31.**
- SEA – Chris Carson 1-yard run (Sebastian Janikowski kick), 3:22. Seahawks 17–14. **Drive: 3 plays, 22 yards, 1:25.**
- GB – Aaron Jones 24-yard pass from Aaron Rodgers (Mason Crosby kick), 0:44. Packers 21–17. **Drive: 5 plays, 75 yards, 2:38.**

**Third quarter**

- No scoring plays.

**Fourth quarter**

- SEA – Sebastian Janikowski 43-yard field goal, 12:14. Packers 21–20. **Drive: 13 plays, 77 yards, 6:30.**
- GB – Mason Crosby 36-yard field goal, 8:23. Packers 24–20. **Drive: 7 plays, 57 yards, 3:51.**
- SEA – Ed Dickson 15-yard pass from Russell Wilson (Sebastian Janikowski kick), 5:08. Seahawks 27–24. **Drive: 7 plays, 75 yards, 3:15.**

**Top passers**

- GB – Aaron Rodgers – 21/30, 332 yards, 2 TD
- SEA – Russell Wilson – 21/31, 225 yards, 2 TD

**Top rushers**

- GB – Aaron Jones – 11 carries, 40 yards, TD
- SEA – Chris Carson – 17 carries, 83 yards, TD

**Top receivers**

- GB – Davante Adams – 10 receptions, 166 yards
- SEA – Tyler Lockett – 5 receptions, 71 yards

==== Week 12: at Carolina Panthers ====
Week Twelve: Seattle Seahawks at Carolina Panthers – Game summary

Quarter	1	2	3	4	Total
**Seahawks**	0	10	7	13	**30**
Panthers	3	10	7	7	**27**

at Bank of America Stadium, Charlotte, North Carolina

- Date: November 25
- Game time: 1:00 p.m. EST/10:00 a.m. PST
- Game weather: 57 °F (14 °C), partly cloudy
- Game attendance: 74,002
- Referee: Shawn Smith
- TV announcers (Fox): Kevin Burkhardt, Charles Davis and Pam Oliver
- Recap, Gamebook

Game information

**First quarter**

- CAR – Graham Gano 26-yard field goal, 2:11. Panthers 3–0. **Drive: 6 plays, 58 yards, 3:21.**

**Second quarter**

- SEA – Sebastian Janikowski 33-yard field goal, 12:41. Tied 3–3. **Drive: 12 plays, 60 yards, 4:30.**
- CAR – Curtis Samuel 7-yard pass from Cam Newton (Graham Gano kick), 6:15. Panthers 10–3. **Drive: 4 plays, 53 yards, 2:12.**
- SEA – Chris Carson 1-yard rush (Sebastian Janikowski kick), 2:24. Tied 10–10. **Drive: 7 plays, 80 yards, 3:54.**
- CAR – Graham Gano 25-yard field goal, 0:00. Panthers 13–10. **Drive: 8 plays, 60 yards, 2:24.**

**Third quarter**

- SEA – Tyler Lockett 12-yard pass from Russell Wilson (Sebastian Janikowski kick), 6:45. Seahawks 17–13. **Drive: 7 plays, 80 yards, 3:54.**
- CAR – Christian McCaffrey 1-yard rush (Graham Gano kick), 1:41. Panthers 20–17. **Drive: 8 plays, 75 yards, 5:04.**

**Fourth quarter**

- SEA – Sebastian Janikowski 30-yard field goal, 9:27. Tied 20–20. **Drive: 14 plays, 63 yards, 7:14.**
- CAR – Christian McCaffrey 2-yard pass from Cam Newton (Graham Gano kick), 6:57. Panthers 27–20. **Drive: 5 plays, 75 yards, 2:30.**
- SEA – David Moore 35-yard pass from Russell Wilson (Sebastian Janikowski kick), 3:26. Tied 27–27. **Drive: 7 plays, 75 yards, 3:31.**
- SEA – Sebastian Janikowski 31-yard field goal, 0:00. Seahawks 30–27. **Drive: 7 plays, 45 yards, 1:40.**

**Top passers**

- SEA – Russell Wilson – 22/31, 339 yards, 2 TD
- CAR – Cam Newton – 25/30, 256 yards, 2 TD, INT

**Top rushers**

- SEA – Chris Carson – 16 carries, 55 yards, TD
- CAR – Christian McCaffrey – 17 carries, 125 yards, TD

**Top receivers**

- SEA – Tyler Lockett – 5 receptions, 107 yards, TD
- CAR – Christian McCaffrey – 11 receptions, 112 yards, TD

==== Week 13: vs. San Francisco 49ers ====
Week Thirteen: San Francisco 49ers at Seattle Seahawks – Game summary

Quarter	1	2	3	4	Total
49ers	0	3	7	6	**16**
**Seahawks**	6	14	7	16	**43**

at CenturyLink Field, Seattle, Washington

- Date: December 2
- Game time: 1:25 p.m. PST
- Game weather: 45 °F (7 °C), cloudy
- Game attendance: 69,009
- Referee: Clete Blakeman
- TV announcers (Fox): Dick Stockton, Mark Schlereth and Jennifer Hale
- Recap, Gamebook

Game information

**First quarter**

- SEA – Jaron Brown 4-yard pass from Russell Wilson (kick failed), 1:25. Seahawks 6–0. **Drive: 7 plays, 74 yards, 4:23.**

**Second quarter**

- SEA – Tyler Lockett 52-yard pass from Russell Wilson (Sebastian Janikowski kick), 13:41. Seahawks 13–0. **Drive: 2 plays, 57 yards, 1:12.**
- SEA – Doug Baldwin 1-yard pass from Russell Wilson (Sebastian Janikowski kick), 1:17. Seahawks 20–0. **Drive: 5 plays, 33 yards, 0:34.**
- SF – Robbie Gould 45-yard field goal, 0:00. Seahawks 20–3. **Drive: 7 plays, 30 yards, 1:17.**

**Third quarter**

- SEA – Rashaad Penny 20-yard rush (Sebastian Janikowski kick), 14:44. Seahawks 27–3. **Drive: 1 plays, 20 yards, 0:16.**
- SF – Dante Pettis 17-yard pass from Nick Mullens (Robbie Gould kick), 11:24. Seahawks 27–10. **Drive: 7 plays, 58 yards, 3:20.**

**Fourth quarter**

- SEA – Jaron Brown 18-yard pass from Russell Wilson (Sebastian Janikowski kick), 14:17. Seahawks 34–10. **Drive: 6 plays, 88 yards, 3:23.**
- SF – Dante Pettis 75-yard pass from Nick Mullens (run failed), 14:06. Seahawks 34–16. **Drive: 1 plays, 75 yards, 0:11.**
- SEA – Sebastian Janikowski 40-yard field goal, 7:46. Seahawks 37–16. **Drive: 11 plays, 53 yards, 6:20.**
- SEA – Bobby Wagner 98-yard interception return (kick failed), 4:04. Seahawks 43–16.

**Top passers**

- SF – Nick Mullens – 30/48, 414 yards, 2 TD, INT
- SEA – Russell Wilson – 11/17, 185 yards, 4 TD

**Top rushers**

- SF – Jeff Wilson – 15 carries, 61 yards
- SEA – Chris Carson – 13 carries, 69 yards

**Top receivers**

- SF – Dante Pettis – 5 receptions, 129 yards, 2 TD
- SEA – Jaron Brown – 3 receptions, 67 yards, 2 TD

==== Week 14: vs. Minnesota Vikings ====
Week Fourteen: Minnesota Vikings at Seattle Seahawks – Game summary

Quarter	1	2	3	4	Total
Vikings	0	0	0	7	**7**
**Seahawks**	0	3	0	18	**21**

at CenturyLink Field, Seattle, Washington

- Date: December 10
- Game time: 5:15 p.m. PST
- Game weather: 48 °F (9 °C), cloudy
- Game attendance: 69,007
- Referee: Brad Allen
- TV announcers (ESPN): Joe Tessitore, Jason Witten, Booger McFarland and Lisa Salters
- Recap, Gamebook

Game information

**First quarter**

- No scoring plays.

**Second quarter**

- SEA – Sebastian Janikowski 37-yard field goal, 14:11. Seahawks 3–0. **Drive: 13 plays, 70 yards, 6:39.**

**Third quarter**

- No scoring plays.

**Fourth quarter**

- SEA – Sebastian Janikowski 35-yard field goal, 13:22. Seahawks 6–0. **Drive: 8 plays, 43 yards, 3:39.**
- SEA – Chris Carson 2-yard rush (Russell Wilson–Tyler Lockett pass), 2:53. Seahawks 14–0. **Drive: 7 plays, 63 yards, 2:45.**
- SEA – Justin Coleman 29-yard fumble return (Sebastian Janikowski kick), 2:35. Seahawks 21–0.
- MIN – Dalvin Cook 6-yard pass from Kirk Cousins (Dan Bailey kick), 1:10. Seahawks 21–7. **Drive: 6 plays, 70 yards, 1:25.**

**Top passers**

- MIN – Kirk Cousins – 20/33, 208 yards, TD
- SEA – Russell Wilson – 10/20, 72 yards, INT

**Top rushers**

- MIN – Dalvin Cook – 13 rushes, 55 yards
- SEA – Chris Carson – 22 rushes, 90 yards, TD

**Top receivers**

- MIN – Stefon Diggs – 4 receptions, 76 yards
- SEA – Tyler Lockett – 5 receptions, 42 yards

==== Week 15: at San Francisco 49ers ====
Week Fifteen: Seattle Seahawks at San Francisco 49ers – Game summary

Quarter	1	2	3	4	OT	Total
Seahawks	6	7	0	10	0	**23**
**49ers**	7	10	3	3	3	**26**

at Levi's Stadium, Santa Clara, California

- Date: December 16
- Game time: 1:05 p.m. PST
- Game weather: 61 °F (16 °C), cloudy
- Game attendance: 68,836
- Referee: Pete Morelli
- TV announcers (Fox): Thom Brennaman, Chris Spielman and Shannon Spake
- Recap, Gamebook

Game information

**First quarter**

- SEA – Doug Baldwin 5-yard pass from Russell Wilson (kick failed), 9:27. Seahawks 6–0. **Drive: 9 plays, 59 yards, 4:05.**
- SF – Richie James 97-yard kickoff return (Robbie Gould kick), 9:15. 49ers 7–6.

**Second quarter**

- SF – Garrett Celek 41-yard pass from Nick Mullens (Robbie Gould kick), 9:29. 49ers 14–6. **Drive: 10 plays, 98 yards, 5:22.**
- SEA – Doug Baldwin 35-yard pass from Russell Wilson (Sebastian Janikowski kick), 5:19. 49ers 14–13. **Drive: 8 plays, 79 yards, 4:10.**
- SF – Robbie Gould 28-yard field goal, 1:05. 49ers 17–13. **Drive: 9 plays, 66 yards, 4:14.**

**Third quarter**

- SF – Robbie Gould 33-yard field goal, 2:54. 49ers 20–13. **Drive: 8 plays, 51 yards, 3:54.**

**Fourth quarter**

- SEA – Chris Carson 1-yard rush (Sebastian Janikowski kick), 13:51. Tied 20–20. **Drive: 10 plays, 75 yards, 4:03.**
- SF – Robbie Gould 45-yard field goal, 9:51. 49ers 23–20. **Drive: 7 plays, 48 yards, 4:00.**
- SEA – Sebastian Janikowski 48-yard field goal, 5:21. Tied 23–23. **Drive: 7 plays, 45 yards, 4:30.**

**Overtime**

- SF – Robbie Gould 36-yard field goal, 3:06. 49ers 26–23. **Drive: 7 plays, 44 yards, 4:19.**

**Top passers**

- SEA – Russell Wilson – 23/31, 237 yards, 2 TD
- SF – Nick Mullens – 20/29, 275 yards, TD

**Top rushers**

- SEA – Chris Carson – 22 carries, 119 yards, TD
- SF – Matt Breida – 17 carries, 50 yards

**Top receivers**

- SEA – Doug Baldwin – 4 receptions, 77 yards, 2 TD
- SF – Dante Pettis – 5 receptions, 83 yards

This was the first time since 2013 that the Seahawks have lost to the 49ers, snapping a ten-game winning streak against the 49ers which dates back to 2013 NFC Championship game.

==== Week 16: vs. Kansas City Chiefs ====
Week Sixteen: Kansas City Chiefs at Seattle Seahawks – Game summary

Quarter	1	2	3	4	Total
Chiefs	3	7	7	14	**31**
**Seahawks**	7	7	10	14	**38**

at CenturyLink Field, Seattle, Washington

- Date: December 23
- Game time: 5:20 p.m. PST
- Game weather: 43 °F (6 °C), cloudy
- Game attendance: 69,067
- Referee: Bill Vinovich
- TV announcers (NBC): Al Michaels, Cris Collinsworth, Michele Tafoya and Terry McAulay
- Recap, Gamebook

Game information

**First quarter**

- SEA – Chris Carson 4-yard rush (Sebastian Janikowski kick), 8:55. Seahawks 7–0. **Drive: 11 plays, 78 yards, 5:06.**
- KC – Harrison Butker 54-yard field goal, 6:34. Seahawks 7–3. **Drive: 8 plays, 39 yards, 2:21.**

**Second quarter**

- KC – Damien Williams 2-yard pass from Patrick Mahomes (Harrison Butker kick), 11:21. Chiefs 10–7. **Drive: 10 plays, 74 yards, 5:26.**
- SEA – Nick Vannett 1-yard pass from Russell Wilson (Sebastian Janikowski kick), 5:26. Seahawks 14–10. **Drive: 6 plays, 21 yards, 3:13.**

**Third quarter**

- SEA – Sebastian Janikowski 28-yard field goal, 9:27. Seahawks 17–10. **Drive: 12 plays, 65 yards, 5:33.**
- KC – Charcandrick West 25-yard pass from Patrick Mahomes (Harrison Butker kick), 5:18. Tied 17–17. **Drive: 7 plays, 83 yards, 4:09.**
- SEA – Doug Baldwin 27-yard pass from Russell Wilson (Sebastian Janikowski kick), 0:45. Seahawks 24–17. **Drive: 8 plays, 75 yards, 4:33.**

**Fourth quarter**

- KC – Harrison Butker 29-yard field goal, 10:28. Seahawks 24–20. **Drive: 10 plays, 60 yards, 3:45.**
- SEA – Ed Dickson 2-yard pass from Russell Wilson (Sebastian Janikowski kick), 7:31. Seahawks 31–20. **Drive: 6 plays, 70 yards, 2:57.**
- KC – Demarcus Robinson 11-yard pass from Patrick Mahomes (Patrick Mahomes run), 4:36. Seahawks 31–28. **Drive: 9 plays, 72 yards, 2:55.**
- SEA – Chris Carson 1-yard rush (Sebastian Janikowski kick), 2:29. Seahawks 38–28. **Drive: 8 plays, 75 yards, 2:07.**
- KC – Harrison Butker 32-yard field goal, 1:20. Seahawks 38–31. **Drive: 5 plays, 16 yards, 1:09.**

**Top passers**

- KC – Patrick Mahomes – 23/40, 273 yards, 3 TD
- SEA – Russell Wilson – 18/29, 271 yards, 3 TD

**Top rushers**

- KC – Damien Williams – 13 carries, 103 yards
- SEA – Chris Carson – 27 carries, 116 yards, 2 TD

**Top receivers**

- KC – Tyreek Hill – 4 receptions, 74 yards
- SEA – Doug Baldwin – 7 receptions, 126 yards, 1 TD

With the win, the Seahawks clinched a wild-card berth, which is their first time making the playoffs since 2016. This win also secured their 7th straight winning season dating back to 2012.

==== Week 17: vs. Arizona Cardinals ====
Week Seventeen: Arizona Cardinals at Seattle Seahawks – Game summary

Quarter	1	2	3	4	Total
Cardinals	3	10	8	3	**24**
**Seahawks**	7	7	7	6	**27**

at CenturyLink Field, Seattle, Washington

- Date: December 30
- Game time: 1:25 p.m. PST
- Game weather: 45 °F (7 °C), cloudy
- Game attendance: 68,990
- Referee: Ronald Torbert
- TV announcers (Fox): Sam Rosen, Brady Quinn and Lisa Byington
- Recap, Gamebook

Game information

**First quarter**

- ARI – Zane Gonzalez 36-yard field goal, 7:22. Cardinals 3–0. **Drive: 7 plays, 11 yards, 2:22.**
- SEA – Tyler Lockett 29-yard pass from Russell Wilson (Sebastian Janikowski kick), 1:25. Seahawks 7–3. **Drive: 6 plays, 47 yards, 2:26.**

**Second quarter**

- SEA – Chris Carson 7-yard rush (Sebastian Janikowski kick), 11:39. Seahawks 14–3. **Drive: 4 plays, 34 yards, 2:12.**
- ARI – Larry Fitzgerald 15-yard pass from Josh Rosen (Zane Gonzalez kick), 5:44. Seahawks 14–10. **Drive: 3 plays, 27 yards, 1:28.**
- ARI – Zane Gonzalez 50-yard field goal, 1:12. Seahawks 14–13. **Drive: 4 plays, 11 yards, 2:13.**

**Third quarter**

- SEA – Mike Davis 17-yard rush (Sebastian Janikowski kick), 4:34. Seahawks 21–13. **Drive: 5 plays, 98 yards, 2:54.**
- ARI – Dennis Gardeck blocked punt recovery in end zone (David Johnson rush), 0:11. Tied 21–21.

**Fourth quarter**

- SEA – Sebastian Janikowski 42-yard field goal, 6:20. Seahawks 24–21. **Drive: 6 plays, 7 yards, 2:38.**
- ARI – Zane Gonzalez 55-yard field goal, 1:49. Tied 24–24. **Drive: 9 plays, 38 yards, 4:31.**
- SEA – Sebastian Janikowski 33-yard field goal, 0:00. Seahawks 27–24. **Drive: 8 plays, 60 yards, 1:49.**

**Top passers**

- ARI – Josh Rosen – 18/34, 149 yards, 1 TD
- SEA – Russell Wilson – 12/21, 152 yards, 1 TD, 1 INT

**Top rushers**

- ARI – David Johnson – 17 carries, 62 yards
- SEA – Chris Carson – 19 carries, 122 yards, 1 TD

**Top receivers**

- ARI – Chad Williams – 5 receptions, 51 yards
- SEA – Tyler Lockett – 2 receptions, 66 yards, 1 TD

With the win, the Seahawks finished the regular season at 10–6, improving on their 9–7 record from last year and securing the No. 5 seed heading into the postseason. They also swept the Cardinals for the first time since 2014.

== Standings ==
=== Division ===
NFC West
	W	L	T	PCT	DIV	CONF	PF	PA	STK
^{(2)} Los Angeles Rams	13	3	0	.813	6–0	9–3	527	384	W2
^{(5)} Seattle Seahawks	10	6	0	.625	3–3	8–4	428	347	W2
San Francisco 49ers	4	12	0	.250	1–5	2–10	342	435	L2
Arizona Cardinals	3	13	0	.188	2–4	3–9	225	425	L4

=== Conference ===
NFC
#	Team	Division	W	L	T	PCT	DIV	CONF	SOS	SOV	STK
Division leaders
1 (Note: New Orleans finished ahead of LA Rams based on head-to-head victory, claiming the No. 1 seed.)	New Orleans Saints	South	13	3	0	.813	4–2	9–3	.482	.488	L1
2	Los Angeles Rams	West	13	3	0	.813	6–0	9–3	.480	.428	W2
3	Chicago Bears	North	12	4	0	.750	5–1	10–2	.430	.419	W4
4	Dallas Cowboys	East	10	6	0	.625	5–1	9–3	.488	.444	W2
Wild Cards
5	Seattle Seahawks	West	10	6	0	.625	3–3	8–4	.484	.400	W2
6	Philadelphia Eagles	East	9	7	0	.563	4–2	6–6	.518	.486	W3
Did not qualify for the postseason
7	Minnesota Vikings	North	8	7	1	.531	3–2–1	6–5–1	.504	.355	L1
8 (Note: Atlanta finished ahead of Washington based on head-to-head victory. Atlanta finished ahead of Carolina based on head-to-head sweep. Washington finished ahead of Carolina based on head-to-head victory.)	Atlanta Falcons	South	7	9	0	.438	4–2	7–5	.482	.348	W3
9	Washington Redskins	East	7	9	0	.438	2–4	6–6	.486	.371	L2
10	Carolina Panthers	South	7	9	0	.438	2–4	5–7	.508	.518	W1
11	Green Bay Packers	North	6	9	1	.406	1–4–1	3–8–1	.488	.417	L1
12	Detroit Lions	North	6	10	0	.375	2–4	4–8	.504	.427	W1
13 (Note: NY Giants finished ahead of Tampa Bay based on head-to-head victory.)	New York Giants	East	5	11	0	.313	1–5	4–8	.527	.487	L3
14	Tampa Bay Buccaneers	South	5	11	0	.313	2–4	4–8	.523	.506	L4
15	San Francisco 49ers	West	4	12	0	.250	1–5	2–10	.504	.406	L2
16	Arizona Cardinals	West	3	13	0	.188	2–4	3–9	.527	.302	L4
Tiebreakers (Note: When breaking ties for three or more teams under the NFL's rules, they are first broken within divisions, then comparing only the highest-ranked remaining team from each division.)

== Postseason ==
Round	Date	Opponent (seed)	Result	Record	Venue	Recap
Wild Card	January 5, 2019	at Dallas Cowboys (4)	L 22–24	0–1	AT&T Stadium	Recap

=== NFC Wild Card Playoffs: at (4) Dallas Cowboys ===
NFC Wild Card Playoffs: (5) Seattle Seahawks at (4) Dallas Cowboys – Game summary

Quarter	1	2	3	4	Total
Seahawks	0	6	8	8	22
Cowboys	3	7	0	14	24

at AT&T Stadium, Arlington, Texas

- Date: January 5, 2019
- Game time: 7:15 p.m. CST/5:15 p.m. PST
- Game weather: Played indoors (retractable roof closed)
- Game attendance: 94,327
- Referee: Walt Anderson
- TV announcers (Fox): Joe Buck, Troy Aikman and Erin Andrews
- Recap, Gamebook

Game information

First quarter

- DAL – Brett Maher 39-yard field goal, 9:54. Cowboys 3–0. Drive: 10 plays, 54 yards, 5:10.

Second quarter

- SEA – Sebastian Janikowski 27-yard field goal, 7:05. Tied 3–3. Drive: 6 plays, 69 yards, 2:45.
- SEA – Sebastian Janikowski 42-yard field goal, 1:47. Seahawks 6–3. Drive: 6 plays, 28 yards, 1:29.
- DAL – Michael Gallup 11-yard pass from Dak Prescott (Brett Maher kick), 0:28. Cowboys 10–6. Drive: 7 plays, 75 yards, 1:19.

Third quarter

- SEA – Russell Wilson 4-yard run (Mike Davis run), 2:03. Seahawks 14–10. Drive: 9 plays, 44 yards, 5:01.

Fourth quarter

- DAL – Ezekiel Elliott 1-yard run (Brett Maher kick), 12:32. Cowboys 17–14. Drive: 9 plays, 67 yards, 4:31.
- DAL – Dak Prescott 1-yard run (Brett Maher kick), 2:14. Cowboys 24–14. Drive: 11 plays, 63 yards, 5:12.
- SEA – J. D. McKissic 7-yard pass from Russell Wilson (Chris Carson run), 1:22. Cowboys 24–22. Drive: 6 plays, 75 yards, 0:50.

Top passers

- SEA – Russell Wilson – 18/27, 233 yards, TD
- DAL – Dak Prescott – 22/33, 226 yards, TD, INT

Top rushers

- SEA – Rashaad Penny – 4 rushes, 29 yards
- DAL – Ezekiel Elliott – 26 rushes, 137 yards, TD

Top receivers

- SEA – Tyler Lockett – 4 receptions, 120 yards
- DAL – Amari Cooper – 7 receptions, 106 yards
