= Pat Bastien =

American football player and coach (born 1991)

Current position
- Title: Defensive backs coach
- Team: Northwestern State
- Conference: Southland

Biographical details
- Born: June 5, 1991 (age 35); Immokalee, Florida, U.S.

Playing career
- 2009–2013: UAB
- Position: Linebacker

Coaching career (HC unless noted)
- 2014-2016: UCF (Graduate Assistant)
- 2016–2018: Georgia Southern (Linebackers)
- 2018–2020: Georgia (Asst Dir of Player Dev)
- 2020–2021: Marshall (Defensive Backs)
- 2021–2022: WKU (Linebackers)
- 2022: Toledo (Linebackers)
- 2022: New York Jets (Off. Asst - QBs)
- 2023: New York Jets (Def. Asst - DBs)
- 2024–present: Northwestern State (DB)

Pat Bastien (born June 5, 1991) is an American football coach and former player who is currently the defensive backs coach at Northwestern State. He has worked as assistant coach at both the college and professional level since 2014.

== Playing career ==
During his collegiate years, Bastien played as a linebacker for UAB, appearing in 44 games and serving as a three-year starter. His performance on the field was notable for its defensive contributions, which laid the groundwork for his transition into a coaching career shortly after completing his playing tenure.

== Coaching career ==
Bastien began his coaching career in 2014 as a graduate assistant at the University of Central Florida (UCF), where he contributed to a team that shared the American Athletic Conference championship. UCF ranked in the top 10 of multiple defensive categories, including total defense and rushing defense.

In 2016, Bastien was hired as an assistant coach for linebackers at Georgia Southern University. During his time there, he coached standout players Ukeme Eligwe and Ironhead Gallon, both of whom earned conference honors. Eligwe was later drafted by the Kansas City Chiefs in the fifth round of the NFL Draft. In 2017, Bastien was selected as a member of 247Sports' "30 Under 30" class.

In 2018, Bastien served as the assistant director of Player Development for the University of Georgia football program under head coach Kirby Smart. Bastien's role involved mentoring student-athletes, overseeing their personal and academic development, and assisting in professional preparation.

During his tenure, Georgia's defense ranked among the best in the nation, finishing in the top 15 in several major categories, including scoring defense, total defense, and rushing defense. The Bulldogs went 11–3 that season, earning a spot in the SEC Championship game and an invitation to the Sugar Bowl.

Bastien continued his coaching career at Marshall University in 2020, where he worked as an assistant coach for defensive backs. Under his leadership, the Marshall defense ranked among the best in the country in several categories, including points allowed and total defense. He then made two coaching stops at Western Kentucky University in 2021 and briefly at The University of Toledo in 2022. With the help of Bastien, Western Kentucky went 9–5 in 2021, including a 59–38 win over Appalachian State in the Boca Raton Bowl. Bastien was recognized for his potential and contributions to football by being named to Football Scoop’s 2022 Minority Watch List/Rising Stars, highlighting him as one of the top up-and-coming coaches in the sport.

In 2022, Bastien joined the coaching staff of the New York Jets as an offensive assistant, contributing to a team focused on rebuilding under head coach Robert Saleh. In his first season, wide receiver Garrett Wilson was named NFL Offensive Rookie of the Year, marking a key milestone for the franchise. Bastien also contributed to the team's efforts to improve overall offensive efficiency compared to prior seasons.

Bastien's expertise extended to the collegiate level, as he was selected to coach the running backs of the American Team at the 74th Annual College Football Senior All-Star Game.

In 2023, Bastien transitioned to a defensive assistant role, where he contributed to the success of the Jets’ secondary, which was recognized as one of the top units in the league. The defense's standout performance was bolstered by rookie cornerback Sauce Gardner, who earned NFL Defensive Rookie of the Year honors, further highlighting the team's development of young talent. Bastien's work within the defensive coaching staff was noted for its focus on player preparation and alignment with the Jets' overall defensive strategy.

Northwestern State hired Bastien as its defensive backs coach in 2024.

== Personal life ==
He is married to Deborah, and they have three children, Princeton, Payton, and Patrick II.
