= Bucky Hodges =

American football player (born 1995)

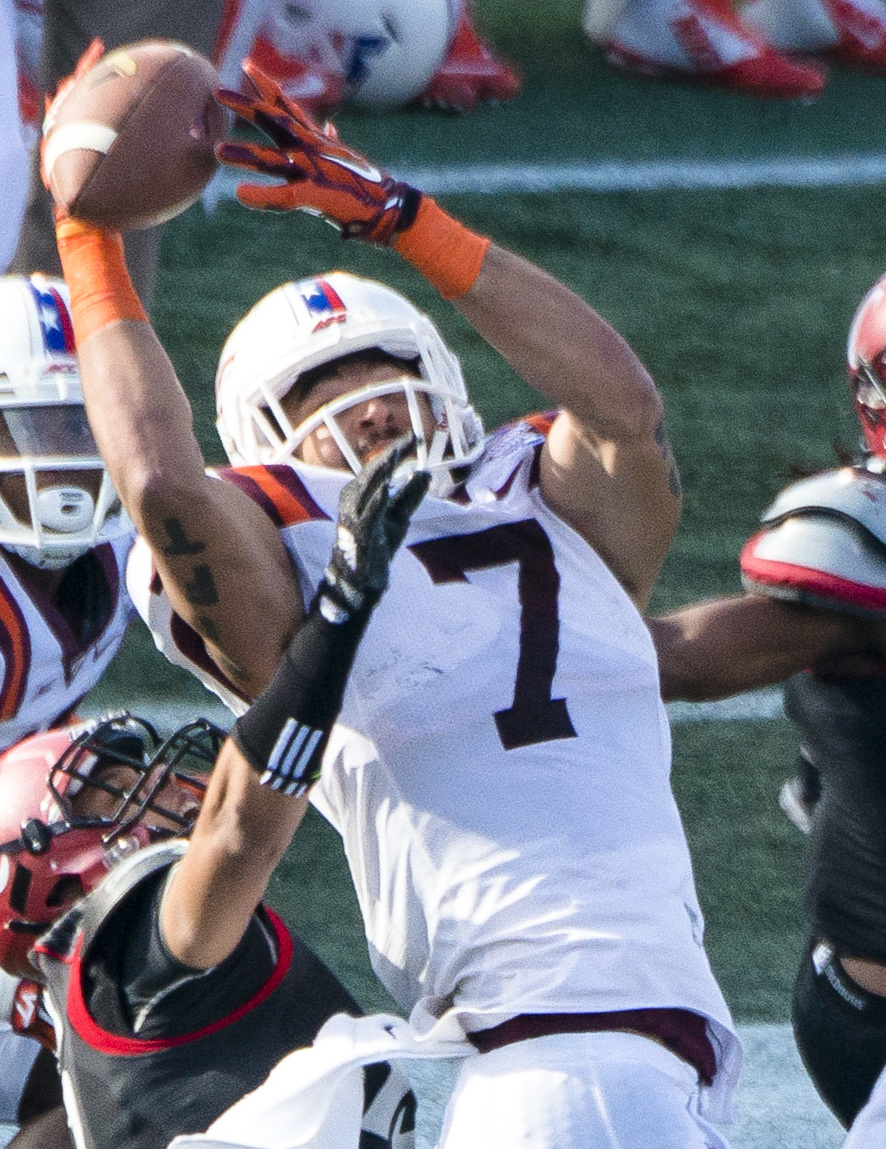
- Hodges with the Virginia Tech Hokies in 2014

No. 7, 84
- Position: Tight end

Personal information
- Born: August 8, 1995 (age 31); Virginia Beach, Virginia, U.S.
- Listed height: 6 ft 6 in (1.98 m)
- Listed weight: 257 lb (117 kg)

Career information
- High school: Salem (Virginia Beach)
- College: Virginia Tech
- NFL draft: 2017: 6th round, 201st overall pick

Career history
- Minnesota Vikings (2017); Carolina Panthers (2017)*; New York Jets (2018)*; Pittsburgh Steelers (2018–2019)*; New York Jets (2019); Edmonton Elks (2022)*
- * Offseason or practice squad member only

Awards and highlights
- 3× Third-team All-ACC (2014, 2015, 2016)
- Stats at Pro Football Reference

Temuchin "Bucky" Hodges Jr (born August 8, 1995) is an American former professional football player who was a tight end in the National Football League (NFL). He played college football for the Virginia Tech Hokies, and was selected by the Minnesota Vikings in the sixth round of the 2017 NFL draft.

== Early life ==
Born in Virginia Beach, Virginia, to Temuchin Hodges and Kimberly Thompson, Hodges attended Salem High School, where he played quarterback for coach Robert Jackson. Growing up, he admired former Ohio State quarterback Terrelle Pryor, and as a quarterback, Hodges modeled his game after him. During his freshman season, Hodges, who was listed at 6'5", focused on his speed and lowered his 40-yard dash time from 5.3 to 4.6 seconds. As a 15-year old sophomore in 2010, Hodges guided the Sun Devils to an 8–4 record, scoring eight times on 102 carries that netted 438 yards, along with connecting on 59.8% of his passes for 1,602 yards and thirteen more scores. In a playoff game victory over rival Ocean Lakes High School, completing 21 of 27 passes for 211 yards with two touchdowns as eight different receivers caught at least two balls. In a narrow loss the next week to Oscar Smith High School, Hodges completed 18 of 23 with one touchdown. During that 2010 playoff run, Hodges weighed in at only 185 pounds, so he spent the offseason adding mass to his frame, and by the start of his junior year, he had gained twenty pounds. In his junior season, Hodges completed 64 percent of his passes for 2,142 yards and 26 touchdowns with six interceptions and rushed for 434 yards and nine more touchdowns as the Sun Devils finished with a 9–1 record in the region. As a senior, he completed 126 of 206 passes for 2,214 yards, with 18 touchdowns and six interceptions while also adding 505 more yards and 11 touchdowns through the ground, earning first-team All-Tidewater selection by The Virginian Pilot as well as first-team All-Beach District selection as an "athlete" and second-team selection at quarterback. After finishing his high school career, Hodges participated in the Offense-Defense All-America Bowl.

In addition to football, Hodges also played basketball and ran track at Salem. In basketball, Hodges averaged ten points and seven rebounds per game during his first season on the varsity. During the 2011 hoops season, he played in 21 games after the gridiron schedule concluded, blocking ten shots as he averaged 10.1 points per game, making 77-of-171 field goals and 36-of-67 free throws. He pulled down 168 rebounds (8.0 avg), handed out 45 assists and had fifteen steals. When the basketball season concluded, he tried his hand in track and field. As a member of the 2011 indoor team, he recorded a 42.25-second mark in the 300 meters at SNU's High School Winter Frolic, where he also posted a high jump mark of 5 ft 4 in (1.63 m). During the 2011 outdoor season, he finished second in the triple jump (38'2") at the Tallwood Meet and tossed the discus (74'4") at The Fork Outdoor Invitational. At that event, he was also a member of the school's 4x100 relay team that captured the title with a time of 49.13 seconds. In 2012, Hodges finished third in the 100 meters with a time of 11.28 seconds at the Beach District, adding a second place mark of 23.32 seconds in the 200 meters while finishing second in the 400 meters at 52.86 seconds. His 4 × 100 metres relay team was also runner-up at that event with a time of 43.79 seconds. CNU's 28th Annual High School Captains Classic was where he helped the 4 × 400 metres relay team finish at 3:41.15. He also posted personal-best times of 38.61 in the 300 meters and 51.63 seconds in the 400 meters during the 2012 season.

A unanimous four-star recruit, Hodges was listed as the 171st-best overall player in the country, the tenth-best pro-style quarter-back in the prep ranks and the tenth-best athlete in the state of Virginia by Rivals.com. He was ranked 179th in the nation by PrepStar and the fourth-best prospect in the state by The Roanoke Times. Super Prep also regarded him as the state's fifth-best player while 247Sports considered him to be Virginia's seventh-best athlete and the fourth-best dual-threat quarterback in the country. On April 21, 2012, Hodges committed to Virginia Tech to play college football. He had scholarship offers from Virginia, Illinois, Ohio State and West Virginia, among others, and also raised some interest from Alabama and Notre Dame.

== College career ==
Originally recruited as a pro-style quarterback, Hodges arrived at Virginia Tech as the presumed heir to Logan Thomas at quarterback, but converted from quarterback to tight end during the spring of 2013 and earned the "Coaches Award for the offense" for his exceptional spring session. In 2013, Hodges redshirted while working with the scout team as both a quarterback and tight end. He bench-pressed 315 pounds and posted a 365-pound front squat in fall scout team max testing. He improved those numbers in spring testing, posting a 325-pound bench press, a 400-pound front squat, a 315-pound power clean and a 300-pound push jerk. In 2015, Hodges started all 13 games, recording 40 receptions for 530 yards with six receiving touchdowns and one rushing touchdown. As a redshirt junior in 2016, Hodges played in all 14 games and had 691 receiving yards and 7 touchdowns. Hodges finished his Virginia Tech career as the fifth-leading receiver in Hokies history, with 133 receptions. He had 1,747 yards and 20 receiving touchdowns, the latter figure ranking third in Tech history.

=== Freshman season (2014) ===
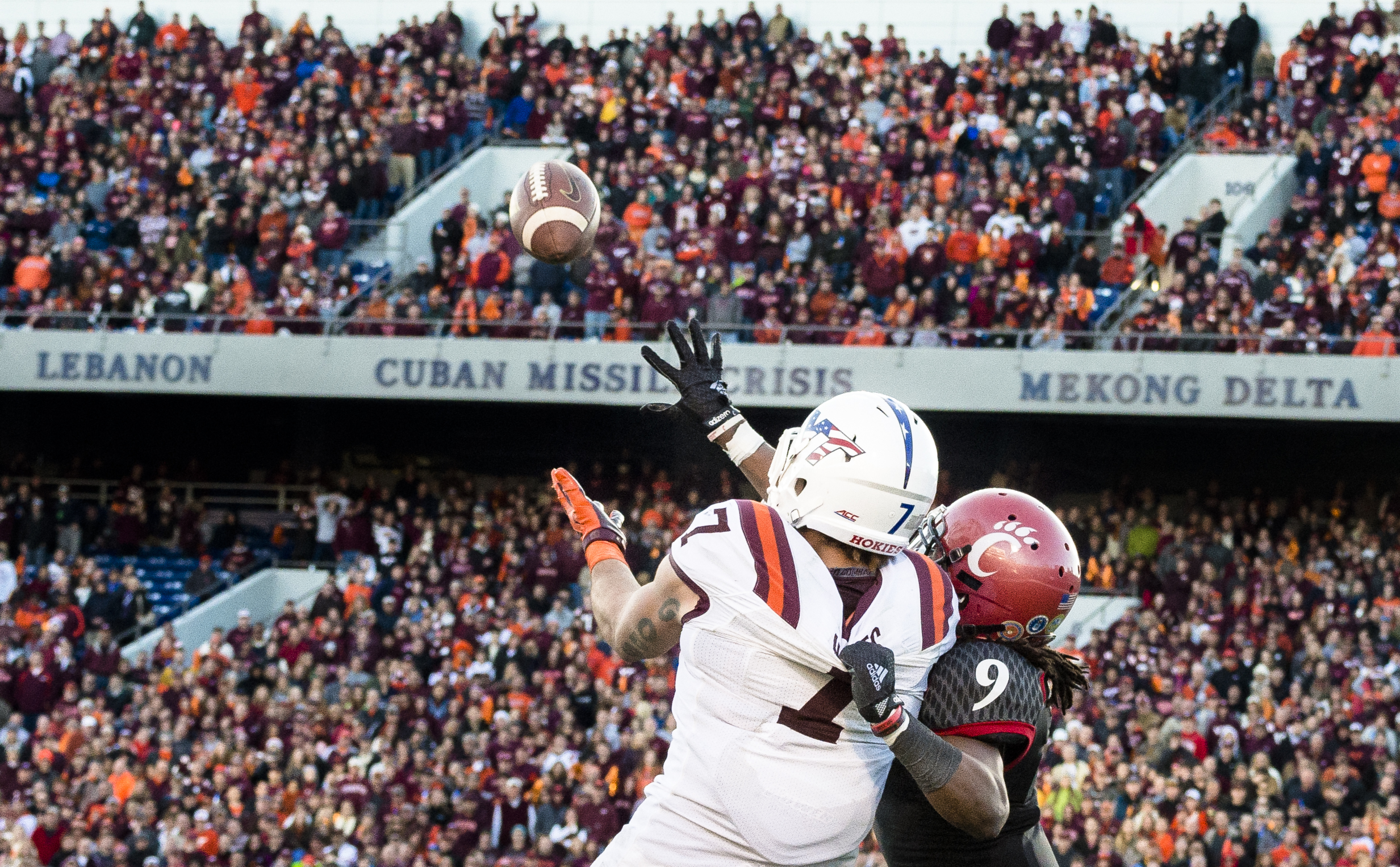
Hodges goes up to catch a pass in the 2014 Military Bowl

During winter workouts, Hodges impressed his teammates by running a 4.46-second 40-yard dash and posting a 38'5" vertical jump, numbers that were fifth and third on the team, respectively.

After redshirting his first year in 2013, Hodges played in all 13 games in 2014, making 10 starts and logging 678 plays, 612 on offense and 66 on special teams. He recorded 45 receptions (the most ever for a freshman tight end at Tech) for 526 yards and scored seven total touchdowns (six receiving, one on special teams) on the season. In his collegiate debut against William & Mary, he caught six passes for 38 yards and a touchdown. The following week, he scored a touchdown in his first career start, finishing the Ohio State win with two catches for 21 yards. In week 5 against Western Michigan, he went for 88 yards and a touchdown on four catches. In the Hokies' win over Duke on November 15, he scored the eventual game-winning touchdown on a 15-yard reception to start the fourth quarter, finishing the game with six catches for 57 yards. He had four receptions for 39 yards at Wake Forest the next week, becoming the single-season leader for catches by a tight end under coach Frank Beamer as his four grabs surpassed the previous mark of 38. In week 12, he scored the game-winning touchdown against Virginia on a 9-yard pass from quarterback Michael Brewer and also recovered a blocked punt in the end zone in the second quarter, taking it to the end zone. His efforts earned him freshman All-American recognition by USA Today and third-team All-Atlantic Coast Conference (ACC) selection by ACSMA.

2014 season breakdown
			Receiving					Rushing				
Date	Opponent	Result	Rec	Yards	Avg	Long	TDs	Att	Yards	Avg	Long	TDs
8/30	William & Mary	W 34-9	6	38	6.3	8	1	0	0	0.0	0	0
9/6	@Ohio State	W 35-21	2	21	10.5	11	1	2	8	4.0	5	0
9/13	East Carolina	L 28-21	2	53	26.5	40	0	0	0	0.0	0	0
9/20	Georgia Tech	L 27-24	1	4	4.0	4	0	0	0	0.0	0	0
9/27	Western Michigan	W 35-17	4	88	22.0	29	1	1	4	4.0	4	0
10/4	@North Carolina	W 34-17	2	30	15.0	26	1	1	1	1.0	1	0
10/16	@Pittsburgh	L 21-16	3	55	18.3	41	0	1	1	1.0	1	0
10/23	Miami	L 30-6	4	27	6.8	13	0	0	0	0.0	0	0
11/1	Boston College	L 33-31	5	44	8.8	24	1	0	0	0.0	0	0
11/15	@Duke	W 17-16	6	57	9.5	26	1	0	0	0.0	0	0
11/22	@Wake Forest	L 6-3	4	39	9.8	15	0	0	0	0.0	0	0
11/28	Virginia	W 24-20	3	61	20.3	50	1	0	0	0.0	0	0
12/27	Cincinnati	W 33-17	3	9	3.0	6	0	2	6	3.0	4	0
2014 totals			45	526	11.7	50	7	7	20	2.9	5	0

=== Sophomore season (2015) ===
Hodges was a second-team All-ACC selection by the coaches and third-team All-ACC selection by the ACSMA as a sophomore. He started all 13 games, recording 40 catches for 530 yards and six touchdowns and rushing five times for 27 yards and a touchdown. On October 24, he had five catches for 101 yards and a career-high three touchdowns against Duke. In week 11, he had six catches for 44 yards and a touchdown against North Carolina. He had an all-around performance in the Independence Bowl against Tulsa, carrying the ball five times 27 yards and a touchdown and hauling in four catches for 38 yards as the Hokies defeated the Golden Hurricane 55–52.

2015 season breakdown
			Receiving					Rushing				
Date	Opponent	Result	Rec	Yards	Avg	Long	TDs	Att	Yards	Avg	Long	TDs
9/7	Ohio State	L 42-24	0	0	0.0	0	0	0	0	0.0	0	0
9/12	Furman	W 42-3	2	48	24.0	26	0	0	0	0.0	0	0
9/19	Purdue	W 51-24	3	11	3.7	5	2	0	0	0.0	0	0
9/26	East Carolina	L 35-28	5	73	14.6	32	0	0	0	0.0	0	0
10/3	Pittsburgh	L 17-13	2	42	21.0	28	0	0	0	0.0	0	0
10/9	NC State	W 28-13	2	33	16.5	26	0	0	0	0.0	0	0
10/17	Miami	L 30-20	2	41	20.5	35	0	0	0	0.0	0	0
10/24	Duke	L 45-43	5	101	20.2	36	3	0	0	0.0	0	0
10/31	Boston College	W 26-10	3	34	11.3	24	0	0	0	0.0	0	0
11/12	Georgia Tech	W 23-21	3	31	10.3	21	0	0	0	0.0	0	0
11/21	North Carolina	L 30-27	6	44	7.7	10	1	0	0	0.0	0	0
11/28	Virginia	W 23-20	3	34	11.3	16	0	0	0	0.0	0	0
12/26	Tulsa	W 55-52	4	38	9.5	19	0	5	27	5.4	16	1
2015 totals			40	530	13.3	46	6	5	27	5.4	16	1

=== Junior season (2016) ===
A tight end for the previous two seasons under offensive coordinator Scot Loeffler in Frank Beamer's final years as the Hokies' head coach, Hodges played wideout in Justin Fuente's spread offense in his junior season. The move to the outside worked out well and Hodges enjoyed his most productive season as he set career-highs with 48 catches for 691 yards and scored seven touchdowns for the third straight season. He earned third-team All-ACC honors from the league's coaches.

2016 season breakdown
			Receiving					Rushing				
Date	Opponent	Result	Rec	Yards	Avg	Long	TDs	Att	Yards	Avg	Long	TDs
9/3	Liberty	W 36-13	3	42	14.0	20	2	1	4	4.0	4	0
9/10	@Tennessee	L 45-24	3	13	4.3	11	0	4	22	5.5	7	0
9/17	Boston College	W 49-0	4	48	12.0	17	0	0	0	0.0	0	0
9/24	East Carolina	W 54-17	2	47	23.5	35	0	0	0	0.0	0	0
10/8	@North Carolina	W 34-3	1	28	28.0	28	0	0	0	0.0	0	0
10/15	@Syracuse	L 31-17	5	79	15.8	27	1	1	6	6.0	6	0
10/20	Miami	W 37-16	7	66	9.4	18	2	0	0	0.0	0	0
10/27	@Pittsburgh	W 39-36	6	145	24.2	36	0	0	0	0.0	0	0
11/5	@Duke	W 24-21	2	24	12.0	20	0	1	0	0.0	0	0
11/12	Georgia Tech	L 30-20	3	22	7.3	11	0	0	0	0.0	0	0
11/19	@Notre Dame	W 34-31	2	15	7.5	8	1	0	0	0.0	0	0
11/26	Virginia	W 52-10	4	69	17.3	42	1	0	0	0.0	0	0
12/3	Clemson	L 42-35	1	42	42.0	42	0	0	0	0.0	0	0
12/29	Arkansas	W 35-24	5	51	10.2	15	0	2	10	5.0	15	0
2016 totals			48	691	14.4	42	7	9	42	4.7	15	0

After the season, on December 30, a day after the Hokies' 35-24 come-from-behind win against Arkansas in the Belk Bowl, Hodges' father, Temuchin, confirmed his intentions to enter the 2017 NFL draft.

=== Statistics ===
Year	Team	Receiving				Rushing			
Year	Team	Rec	Yards	Avg	TDs	Att	Yards	Avg	TDs
2014	Virginia Tech	45	526	11.7	7	7	20	2.9	0
2015	Virginia Tech	40	530	13.3	6	5	27	5.4	1
2016	Virginia Tech	48	691	14.4	7	9	42	4.7	0
Career		133	1,747	13.1	20	21	89	4.2	1

== Professional career ==
=== Pre-draft ===
In December 2016, ESPN draft analyst Mel Kiper Jr. had Hodges along with Alabama's O. J. Howard as his top tight ends on the draft board. He gave both a first-round grade, ranking Hodges as the No. 32 prospect overall.

External videos
- Hodges performing at the NFL Combine

Pre-draft measurables
Height	Weight	Arm length	Hand span	40-yard dash	10-yard split	20-yard split	20-yard shuttle	Vertical jump	Broad jump	Bench press
6 ft 6 in (1.98 m)	257 lb (117 kg)	32 1/2 in (0.83 m)	10 1/8 in (0.26 m)	4.57 s	1.59 s	2.64 s	4.45 s	39 in (0.99 m)	11 ft 2 in (3.40 m)	18 reps
All values are from NFL Combine

=== Minnesota Vikings ===
Hodges was selected by the Minnesota Vikings, in the sixth round, 201st overall, in the 2017 NFL draft. He was the second Hokie off the board, joining safety Chuck Clark, who went earlier in the sixth round to the Baltimore Ravens. Hodges ended up being the 13th tight end off the board. He was the first offensive player selected from Virginia Tech since quarterback Logan Thomas (now a tight end) went to the Cardinals in the 2014 NFL draft. On September 3, 2017, Hodges was waived/injured by the Vikings and placed on injured reserve. He was released on September 12, 2017.

=== Carolina Panthers ===
On September 15, 2017, Hodges was signed to the practice squad of the Carolina Panthers. He was released on October 31, 2017.

=== New York Jets (first stint) ===
On April 3, 2018, Hodges signed with the New York Jets. He was released on July 29, 2018.

=== Pittsburgh Steelers ===
On August 2, 2018, Hodges signed with the Pittsburgh Steelers. He was waived on September 1, 2018, and was signed to the practice squad the next day. He signed a reserve/future contract with the Steelers on January 2, 2019. He was waived on April 25, 2019.

=== New York Jets (second stint) ===
On July 24, 2019, Hodges signed with the New York Jets, but was waived/injured on August 3. He was placed on injured reserve after clearing waivers on August 4. He was placed on the exempt/left squad list on September 3, 2019, and waived from the list on October 1.

Hodges worked out for the Washington Redskins on November 12, 2019.

He was selected by the Generals of The Spring League in their player selection draft on October 10, 2020.

=== Edmonton Elks ===
The Edmonton Elks announced the signing of Hodges on January 26, 2022. Hodges was released by the Elks on May 12, 2022, before the start of training camp.
