= 2015 Independence Bowl =

2015 Camping World Independence Bowl
- 40th Independence Bowl
Tulsa Golden Hurricane	Virginia Tech Hokies
(6–6)	(6–6)
The American	ACC
52	55
Head coach: Philip Montgomery	Head coach: Frank Beamer
	1	2	3	4	Total
Tulsa	21	10	6	15	52
Virginia Tech	24	21	7	3	55
- Date: December 26, 2015
- Season: 2015
- Stadium: Independence Stadium
- Location: Shreveport, Louisiana
- Favorite: Va. Tech by 13½
- Referee: Cooper Castleberry (Big XII)
- Attendance: 31,289
- Payout: US$TBD

United States TV coverage
- Network: ESPN/Sports USA
- Announcers: Dave LaMont, Ray Bentley, & Jane Slater (ESPN); Eli Gold, Phil Savage, & Darrell Rebouche (Sports USA)

The 2015 Independence Bowl was a college football bowl game that was played on Saturday, December 26, 2015 at Independence Stadium in Shreveport, Louisiana in the United States. The 40th annual Independence Bowl featured the Virginia Tech Hokies of the Atlantic Coast Conference against the Tulsa Golden Hurricane of the American Athletic Conference. Sponsored by Camping World, the game was officially known as the Camping World Independence Bowl. The first half of the game, in which 76 points were scored, was the highest scoring half in college football bowl history until the second half of the Famous Idaho Potato Bowl the next year. Montgomery would later become the offensive coordinator and interim head coach for the Hokies in 2025.

== Team selection ==
The game was to feature a team from the Atlantic Coast Conference against a team from the Southeastern Conference. However, college football analyst Phil Steele projected prior to the game that neither an ACC nor an SEC team would be selected for the game, projecting that the Minnesota Golden Gophers of the Big Ten Conference and the San Jose State Spartans of the Mountain West Conference would be selected for the game instead. Virginia Tech was chosen from the ACC, and Tulsa was chosen after the SEC did not have enough eligible teams.

=== Virginia Tech Hokies ===
With the announcement that he would retire after the season, Virginia Tech head coach Frank Beamer took the field one last time to coach the Hokies in the Independence Bowl. Beamer has led the Hokies to 23 straight bowl appearances in 25 seasons as an FBS team (Beamer has coached at VT for a total of 29 seasons). He held a 10–12 career bowl record going into this game. The Hokies won their final game of the season over rival Virginia on a last-second INT, gaining bowl eligibility and extending Beamer's career one more game.

=== Tulsa Golden Hurricane ===
This was Tulsa's first bowl appearance since a 31–17 win over Iowa State in the 2012 Liberty Bowl. It was also the first career bowl appearance for first-year head coach Philip Montgomery. The Golden Hurricane program was 9–10 all-time in bowl games but was 5–3 since 2003. Montgomery would later become the offensive coordinator and interim head coach for the Hokies in 2025.

== Game summary ==
=== Scoring summary ===
Scoring summary

Quarter	Time	Drive			Team	Scoring information	Score	
Quarter	Time	Plays	Yards	TOP	Team	Scoring information	TLS	VT
1	14:14	4	75	0:46	TLS	D'Angelo Brewer 48-yard touchdown run, Redford Jones kick good	7	0
1	12:53	3	63	1:21	VT	Travon McMillian 51-yard touchdown run, Joey Slye kick good	7	7
1	11:54	5	75	0:59	TLS	Zack Langer 2-yard touchdown run, Redford Jones kick good	14	7
1	11:42	1	75	0:12	VT	Isaiah Ford 75-yard touchdown reception from Michael Brewer, Joey Slye kick good	14	14
1	9:53	4	4	0:56	VT	27-yard field goal by Joey Slye	14	17
1	5:28	8	76	2:48	VT	Sam Rogers 14-yard touchdown run, Joey Slye kick good	14	24
1	2:19	9	75	3:09	TLS	Bishop Louie 9-yard touchdown reception from Dane Evans, Redford Jones kick good	21	24
2	13:09	10	75	4:10	VT	Bucky Hodges 16-yard touchdown run, Joey Slye kick good	21	31
2	9:09	7	80	3:05	VT	Travon McMillian 1-yard touchdown run, Joey Slye kick good	21	38
2	7:11				VT	Greg Stroman 67 yard punt return for a touchdown, Joey Slye kick good	21	45
2	2:26	12	65	4:45	TLS	29-yard field goal by Redford Jones	24	45
2	0:20	6	64	0:45	TLS	D'Angelo Brewer 10-yard touchdown run, Redford Jones kick good	31	45
3	7:38	15	81	7:22	VT	Trey Edmunds 1-yard touchdown run, Joey Slye kick good	31	52
3	4:11	1	9	0:04	TLS	Dane Evans 9-yard touchdown run, Redford Jones kick failed	37	52
4	11:09	6	38	2:32	VT	41-yard field goal by Joey Slye	37	55
4	7:35	9	75	3:34	TLS	Josh Atkinson 21-yard touchdown reception from Dane Evans, 2-point pass from Dane Evans to Keyarris Garrett good	45	55
4	3:47	7	76	2:08	TLS	Keyarris Garrett 36-yard touchdown reception from Dane Evans, Redford Jones kick good	52	55
"TOP" = time of possession. For other American football terms, see Glossary of American football.							52	55

=== Statistics ===
Statistics	TLS	VT
First downs	27	30
Total offense, plays - yards	83–563	81–598
Rushes-yards (net)	39–189	43–254
Passing yards (net)	374	344
Passes, Comp-Att-Int	27–44–0	23–38–1
Time of Possession	26:20	33:40
