= 2015 Tulsa Golden Hurricane football team =

American college football season

2015 Tulsa Golden Hurricane football

Independence Bowl, L 52–55 vs. Virginia Tech
- Conference: American Athletic Conference
- West Division
- Record: 6–7 (3–5 AAC)
- Head coach: Philip Montgomery (1st season)
- Co-offensive coordinators: Sterlin Gilbert (1st season); Matt Mattox (1st season)
- Offensive scheme: Veer and shoot
- Co-defensive coordinators: Brian Norwood (1st season); Bill Young (3rd season)
- Base defense: 4–3
- Home stadium: Skelly Field at H. A. Chapman Stadium

2015 American Athletic Conference football standings
	Conf.			Overall
Team	W		L	W		L
East Division
Temple x	7	–	1	10	–	4
South Florida	6	–	2	8	–	5
Cincinnati	4	–	4	7	–	6
UConn	4	–	4	6	–	7
East Carolina	3	–	5	5	–	7
UCF	0	–	8	0	–	12
West Division
No. 8 Houston xy$	7	–	1	13	–	1
No. 18 Navy x	7	–	1	11	–	2
Memphis	5	–	3	9	–	4
Tulsa	3	–	5	6	–	7
Tulane	1	–	7	3	–	9
SMU	1	–	7	2	–	10
Championship: Houston 24, Temple 13
$ – Conference champion; x – Division champion/co-champions; y – Championship game participant; As of December 31, 2015; Rankings from AP Poll

The 2015 Tulsa Golden Hurricane football team represented the University of Tulsa during the 2015 NCAA Division I FBS football season. They were led by first-year head coach Philip Montgomery and played their home games at Skelly Field at H. A. Chapman Stadium. They were second year members of the American Athletic Conference in the Western Division. They finished the season 6–7, 3–5 in American Athletic play to finish in fourth place in the Western Division. They were invited to the Independence Bowl where they lost to Virginia Tech.

== Schedule ==
Date	Time	Opponent	Site	TV	Result	Attendance	Source
September 5	2:30 p.m.	Florida Atlantic*	Skelly Field at H. A. Chapman Stadium; Tulsa, OK	CBSSN	W 47–44 ^{OT}	24,001	
September 12	7:00 p.m.	at New Mexico*	University Stadium; Albuquerque, NM	ESPN3	W 40–21	24,167	
September 19	11:00 a.m.	at No. 16 Oklahoma*	Gaylord Family Oklahoma Memorial Stadium; Norman, OK	FS1	L 38–52	85,657	
October 3	11:00 a.m.	Houston	Skelly Field at H. A. Chapman Stadium; Tulsa, OK	CBSSN	L 24–38	17,146	
October 10	5:00 p.m.	Louisiana–Monroe*	Skelly Field at H. A. Chapman Stadium; Tulsa, OK	ESPN3	W 34–24	17,490	
October 17	11:00 a.m.	at East Carolina	Dowdy–Ficklen Stadium; Greenville, NC	ESPNews	L 17–30	43,065	
October 23	7:00 p.m.	No. 18 Memphis^{†}	Skelly Field at H. A. Chapman Stadium; Tulsa, OK	ESPN	L 42–66	20,216	
October 31	3:00 p.m.	at SMU	Gerald J. Ford Stadium; University Park, TX	ESPNews	W 40–31	18,127	
November 7	11:00 a.m.	UCF	Skelly Field at H. A. Chapman Stadium; Tulsa, OK	ESPNews	W 45–30	16,128	
November 14	6:30 p.m.	at Cincinnati	Nippert Stadium; Cincinnati, OH	ESPNews	L 38–49	35,015	
November 21	6:00 p.m.	No. 19 Navy	Skelly Field at H. A. Chapman Stadium; Tulsa, OK	CBSSN	L 21–44	22,749	
November 27	7:00 p.m.	at Tulane	Yulman Stadium; New Orleans, LA	ESPNU	W 45–34	22,672	
December 26	4:45 p.m.	vs. Virginia Tech*	Independence Stadium; Shreveport, LA (Independence Bowl)	ESPN	L 52–55	31,289	
*Non-conference game; ^{†}Homecoming; Rankings from AP Poll released prior to the game; All times are in Central time

== Game summaries ==
=== Florida Atlantic ===
Team	1	2	3	4	OT	Total
Owls	7	10	21	3	3	44
• Golden Hurricane	14	7	7	13	6	47

- TV announcers: Sean Grande, Corey Chavous, Melanie Collins

Scoring summary
1	4:34	FAU	Greg Howell 11-yard run (Greg Joseph kick)	FAU 7–0
1	2:45	TU	Keevan Lucas 39-yard pass from Dane Evans (Redford Jones kick)	Tied 7–7
1	0:39	TU	Evans 9-yard run (Jones kick)	TU 14–7
2	12:49	TU	Lucas 43-yard pass from Evans (Jones kick)	TU 21–7
2	6:18	FAU	Jenson Stoshak 17-yard pass from Jaquez Johnson (Joseph kick)	TU 21–14
2	0:56	FAU	Joseph 45-yard field goal	TU 21–17
3	14:02	FAU	Jay Warren 38-yard run (Joseph kick)	FAU 24–21
3	11:14	FAU	Howell 5-yard run (Joseph kick)	FAU 31–21
3	8:27	TU	Zack Langer 5-yard run (Jones kick)	FAU 31–28
3	5:51	FAU	Kalib Woods 2-yard pass from Johnson (Joseph kick)	FAU 38–28
4	13:23	TU	Langer 1-yard run (Jones kick)	FAU 38–35
4	5:41	TU	Jones 32-yard field goal	Tied 38–38
4	1:48	FAU	Joseph 47-yard field goal	FAU 41–38
4	0:03	TU	Jones 39-yard field goal	Tied 41–41
OT		FAU	Joseph 27-yard field goal	FAU 44–41
OT		TU	Langer 3-yard run	TU 47–44

=== At New Mexico ===
Team	1	2	3	4	Total
• Golden Hurricane	10	10	10	10	40
Lobos	14	0	7	0	21

- TV announcers: Trey Bender, Jay Taylor

Scoring summary
1	12:12	UNM	Teriyon Gipson 13-yard run (Jason Sanders kick)	UNM 7–0
1	11:26	TU	Joshua Atkinson 69-yard pass from Dane Evans (Redford Jones kick)	Tied 7–7
1	7:56	TU	Jones 34-yard field goal	TU 10–7
1	2:42	UNM	Dameon Gamblin 62-yard pass from Lamar Jordan (Sanders kick)	UNM 14–10
2	11:30	TU	Keevan Lucas 41-yard pass from Evans (Jones kick)	TU 17–14
2	3:56	TU	Jones 22-yard field goal	TU 20–14
3	12:00	TU	Jones 23-yard field goal	TU 23–14
3	9:54	UNM	Gipson 4-yard run (Sanders kick)	TU 23–21
3	3:02	TU	D'Angelo Brewer 1-yard run (Jones kick)	TU 30–21
4	10:40	TU	Jones 24-yard field goal	TU 33–21
4	4:07	TU	Zack Langer 5-yard run (Jones kick)	TU 40–21

=== At Oklahoma ===
Team	1	2	3	4	Total
Golden Hurricane	3	21	7	7	38
• No. 16 Sooners	17	14	14	7	52

- TV announcers: Tim Brando, Spencer Tillman, Bruce Feldman

Scoring summary
1	12:03	OU	Austin Seibert 20-yard field goal	OU 3–0
1	8:04	TU	Redford Jones 23-yard field goal	Tied 3–3
1	4:54	OU	Baker Mayfield 39-yard run (Seibert kick)	OU 10–3
1	1:18	OU	Joe Mixon 10-yard pass from Mayfield (Seibert kick)	OU 17–3
2	13:31	OU	Mayfield 8-yard run (Seibert kick)	OU 24–3
2	6:20	TU	Joshua Atkinson 18-yard pass from Dane Evans (Jones kick)	OU 24–10
2	3:14	OU	Mark Andrews 61-yard pass from Mayfield (Seibert kick)	OU 31–10
2	0:13	TU	Keevan Lucas 28-yard pass from Evans (Jones kick)	OU 31–17
2	0:01	TU	Keyarris Garrett 43-yard pass from Evans (Jones kick)	OU 31–24
3	6:47	OU	Jarvis Baxter 29-yard pass from Mayfield (Seibert kick)	OU 38–24
3	4:01	TU	Zack Langer 1-yard run (Jones kick)	OU 38–31
3	0:40	OU	Andrews 17-yard pass from Mayfield (Seibert kick)	OU 45–31
4	4:28	OU	Samaje Perine 20-yard run (Seibert kick)	OU 52–31
4	3:38	TU	Lucas 40-yard pass from Evans (Jones kick)	OU 52–38

=== Houston ===
Team	1	2	3	4	Total
• Cougars	7	14	3	14	38
Golden Hurricane	10	0	7	7	24

- TV announcers: Dave Ryan, Corey Chavous, Melanie Collins

Scoring summary
1	11:23	TU	Redford Jones 46-yard field goal	TU 3–0
1	8:57	UH	Greg Ward 3-yard run (Kyle Bullard kick)	UH 7–3
1	4:58	TU	Zack Langer 7-yard run (Jones kick)	TU 10–7
2	11:31	UH	Ward 32-yard run (Bullard kick)	UH 14–10
2	0:15	UH	Ward 8-yard run (Bullard kick)	UH 21–10
3	7:17	UH	Bullard 21-yard field goal	UH 24–10
3	4:52	TU	Langer 1-yard run (Jones kick)	UH 24–17
4	11:36	UH	Kenneth Farrow 5-yard run (Bullard kick)	UH 31–17
4	2:21	UH	Farrow 44-yard run (Bullard kick)	UH 38–17
4	1:20	TU	Langer 1-yard run (Jones kick)	UH 38–24

=== Louisiana–Monroe ===
Team	1	2	3	4	Total
Warhawks	0	7	17	0	24
• Golden Hurricane	10	10	0	14	34

- TV announcers: Joel Meyers, Pete Najarian

Scoring summary
1	8:01	TU	Redford Jones 34-yard field goal	TU 3–0
1	0:31	TU	Zack Langer 1-yard run (Jones kick)	TU 10–0
2	10:15	ULM	Garrett Smith 3-yard run (Craig Ford kick)	TU 10–7
2	1:53	TU	Jones 28-yard field goal	TU 13–7
2	0:26	TU	Justin Hobbs 36-yard pass from Dane Evans (Jones kick)	TU 20–7
3	11:56	ULM	Ford 22-yard field goal	TU 20–10
3	6:16	ULM	Ajalen Holley 26-yard pass from Smith (Ford kick)	TU 20–17
3	3:16	ULM	DeVontae McNeal 43-yard run (Ford kick)	ULM 24–20
4	8:41	TU	D'Angelo Brewer 15-yard pass from Evans (Jones kick)	TU 27–24
4	6:16	TU	Langer 1-yard run (Jones kick)	TU 34–24

=== At East Carolina ===
Team	1	2	3	4	Total
Golden Hurricane	0	0	0	17	17
• Pirates	7	13	3	7	30

- TV announcers: Mike Corey, Rene Ingoglia

Scoring summary
1	10:46	ECU	Josh Hawkins 100-yard Interception return (Davis Plowman kick)	ECU 7–0
2	10:54	ECU	Plowman 24-yard field goal	ECU 10–0
2	5:50	ECU	Chris Hairston 12-yard pass from James Summers (Plowman kick)	ECU 17–0
2	1:13	ECU	Plowman 23-yard field goal	ECU 20–0
3	4:52	ECU	Plowman 41-yard field goal	ECU 23–0
4	12:13	TU	Zack Langer 1-yard run (Redford Jones kick)	ECU 23–7
4	7:12	TU	Jones 21-yard field goal	ECU 23–10
4	1:24	ECU	Summers 6-yard run (Plowman kick)	ECU 30–10
4	0:30	TU	Keyarris Garrett 47-yard pass from Dane Evans (Jones kick)	ECU 30–17

=== Memphis ===
Team	1	2	3	4	Total
• #18 Tigers	14	21	17	14	66
Golden Hurricane	7	14	14	7	42

- TV announcers: Dave Flemming, Mack Brown, Allison Williams

Scoring summary
1	9:50	MEM	Tevin Jones 58-yard pass from Paxton Lynch (Jake Elliott kick)	MEM 7–0
1	6:14	TU	Keyarris Garrett 36-yard pass from Dane Evans (Redford Jones kick)	Tied 7–7
1	2:25	MEM	Anthony Miller 45-yard pass from Lynch (Elliott kick)	MEM 14–7
2	14:56	TU	Ramadi Warren 5-yard run (Jones kick)	Tied 14–14
2	12:35	MEM	Jamarius Henderson 10-yard run (Elliott kick)	MEM 21–14
2	6:39	MEM	Henderson 21-yard pass from Lynch (Elliott kick)	MEM 28–14
2	0:53	MEM	Doroland Dorceus 1-yard run (Elliott kick)	MEM 35–14
2	0:00	TU	Garrett 46-yard pass from Evans (Jones kick)	MEM 35–21
3	13:04	MEM	Dorceus 1-yard run (Elliott kick)	MEM 42–21
3	11:15	TU	Garrett 32-yard pass from Evans (Jones kick)	MEM 42–28
3	9:30	TU	Joshua Atkinson 80-yard pass from Evans (Jones kick)	MEM 42–35
3	5:34	MEM	Lynch 3-yard run (Elliott kick)	MEM 49–35
3	0:44	MEM	Elliott 30-yard field goal	MEM 52–35
4	12:39	MEM	Jones 5-yard pass from Lynch (Elliott kick)	MEM 59–35
4	7:06	TU	Rowdy Simon 4-yard run (Jones kick)	MEM 59–42
4	1:39	MEM	Henderson 20-yard run (Elliott kick)	MEM 66–42

=== At SMU ===
Team	1	2	3	4	Total
• Golden Hurricane	3	20	10	7	40
Mustangs	14	7	3	7	31

- TV announcers: Jason Benetti, David Diaz-Infante

Scoring summary
1	11:22	SMU	Courtland Sutton 5-yard pass from Matt Davis (Chad Hedlund kick)	SMU 7–0
1	4:02	TU	Redford Jones 21-yard field goal	SMU 7–3
1	1:27	SMU	Jeremiah Gaines 13-yard pass from Davis (Hedlund kick)	SMU 14–3
2	10:14	TU	Zack Langer 2-yard run (Jones kick)	SMU 14–10
2	2:33	TU	Kerwin Thomas 31-yard Interception return (Jones kick blocked)	TU 16–14
2	1:12	SMU	Xavier Castille 39-yard pass from Xavier Jones (Hedlund kick)	SMU 21–16
2	0:19	TU	D'Angelo Brewer 23-yard run (Jones kick)	TU 23–21
3	8:24	TU	Langer 1-yard run (Jones kick)	TU 30–21
3	3:42	SMU	Hedlund 37-yard field goal	TU 30–24
3	0:53	TU	Jones 44-yard field goal	TU 33–24
4	14:53	SMU	Sutton 18-yard pass from Davis (Hedlund kick)	TU 33–31
4	10:08	TU	Langer 1-yard run (Jones kick)	TU 40–31

=== UCF ===
Team	1	2	3	4	Total
Knights	3	0	17	10	30
• Golden Hurricane	14	10	0	21	45

- TV announcers: Eamon McAnaney, Rocky Boiman

Scoring summary
1	8:49	TU	Conner Floyd 36-yard pass from Dane Evans (Redford Jones kick)	TU 7–0
1	1:48	UCF	Matthew Wright 37-yard field goal	TU 7–3
1	0:02	TU	Floyd 12-yard pass from Evans (Jones kick)	TU 14–3
2	6:19	TU	Ramadi Warren 5-yard run (Jones kick)	TU 21–3
2	2:52	TU	Jones 28-yard field goal	TU 24–3
3	9:37	UCF	Taj McGowan 2-yard run (Wright kick)	TU 24–10
3	6:34	UCF	Wright 19-yard field goal	TU 24–13
3	3:35	UCF	Tre'Quan Smith 11-yard pass from Justin Holman (Wright kick)	TU 24–20
4	13:24	TU	Warren 1-yard run (Jones kick)	TU 31–20
4	9:32	UCF	Wright 43-yard field goal	TU 31–23
4	7:38	TU	Warren 2-yard run (Jones kick)	TU 38–23
4	3:31	TU	Michael Mudoh 86-yard Interception return (Jones kick)	TU 45–23
4	1:04	UCF	Jordan Franks 10-yard pass from Holman (Wright kick)	TU 45–30

=== At Cincinnati ===
Team	1	2	3	4	Total
Golden Hurricane	7	7	10	14	38
• Bearcats	14	7	14	14	49

- TV announcers: Eamon McAnaney, Rocky Boiman

Scoring summary
1	10:39	TU	Conner Floyd 18-yard pass from Dane Evans (Redford Jones kick)	TU 7–0
1	5:35	CIN	Mike Boone 12-yard run (Andrew Gantz kick)	Tied 7–7
1	0:33	CIN	Max Morrison 17-yard pass from Gunner Kiel (Gantz kick)	CIN 14–7
2	8:17	TU	Ramadi Warren 65-yard run (Jones kick)	Tied 14–14
2	5:03	CIN	Boone 4-yard run (Gantz kick)	CIN 21–14
3	6:57	TU	Warren 39-yard run (Jones kick)	Tied 21–21
3	5:14	TU	Jones 33-yard field goal	TU 24–21
3	3:31	CIN	Chris Moore 43-yard pass from Kiel (Gantz kick)	CIN 28–24
3	1:36	CIN	Tion Green 5-yard run (Gantz kick)	CIN 35–24
4	10:42	CIN	Hosey Williams 20-yard run (Gantz kick)	CIN 42–24
4	5:08	TU	D'Angelo Brewer 2-yard run (Jones kick)	CIN 42–31
4	1:01	CIN	Boone 3-yard run (Gantz kick)	CIN 49–31
4	0:15	TU	Keyarris Garrett 46-yard pass from Evans (Jones kick)	CIN 49–38

=== Navy ===
Team	1	2	3	4	Total
• Midshipmen	7	16	14	7	44
Golden Hurricane	0	7	7	7	21

- TV announcers: Rich Waltz, Adam Archuleta, Rashan Ali

Scoring summary
1	6:28	NAVY	Toneo Gulley 70-yard run (Austin Grebe kick)	NAVY 7–0
2	10:29	NAVY	Jamir Tillman 39-yard pass from Keenan Reynolds (Grebe kick)	NAVY 14–0
2	6:09	NAVY	Reynolds 1-yard run (Grebe kick)	NAVY 21–0
2	2:16	TU	Zack Langer 1-yard run (Redford Jones kick)	NAVY 21–7
2	0:04	NAVY	Team Safety	NAVY 23–7
3	14:05	NAVY	Demond Brown 4-yard run (Grebe kick)	NAVY 30–7
3	11:04	TU	Langer 4-yard run (Jones kick)	NAVY 30–14
3	7:03	NAVY	Quentin Ezell 3-yard run (Grebe kick)	NAVY 37–14
4	14:52	NAVY	Brandon Colon 23-yard run (Grebe kick)	NAVY 44–14
4	2:55	TU	D'Angelo Brewer 14-yard run (Jones kick)	NAVY 44–21

=== At Tulane ===
Team	1	2	3	4	Total
• Golden Hurricane	7	7	10	21	45
Green Wave	7	17	3	7	34

- TV announcers: Roy Philpott, Brian Kinchen

Scoring summary
1	12:29	TULSA	Justin Hobbs 20-yard pass from Dane Evans (Redford Jones kick)	TULSA 7–0
1	5:59	TULANE	Charles Jones 28-yard pass from Jordy Joseph (Andrew DiRocco kick)	Tied 7–7
2	12:00	TULANE	Teddy Veal 3-yard pass from Joseph (DiRocco kick)	TULANE 14–7
2	10:48	TULSA	Josh Atkinson 35-yard pass from Evans (Jones kick)	Tied 14–14
2	4:19	TULANE	DiRocco 31-yard field goal	TULANE 17–14
2	3:00	TULANE	Dontrell Hilliard 66-yard pass from Joseph (DiRocco kick)	TULANE 24–14
3	7:05	TULSA	Keyarris Garrett 30-yard pass from Evans (Jones kick)	TULANE 24–21
3	3:11	TULSA	Jones 40-yard field goal	Tied 24–24
3	0:19	TULANE	DiRocco 39-yard field goal	TULANE 27–24
4	7:40	TULANE	Andrew Hicks 34-yard pass from Joseph (DiRocco kick)	TULANE 34–24
4	6:45	TULSA	Zack Langer 1-yard run (Jones kick)	TULANE 34–31
4	6:31	TULSA	Craig Suits 28-yard Interception return (Jones kick)	TULSA 38–34
4	1:12	TULSA	Kolton Shindelar 89-yard Interception return (Jones kick)	TULSA 45–34

=== Vs. Virginia Tech–Independence Bowl ===
Team	1	2	3	4	Total
Golden Hurricane	21	10	6	15	52
• Hokies	24	21	7	3	55

- TV announcers: Dave LaMont, Ray Bentley, Jane Slater

Scoring summary
1	14:14	TU	D'Angelo Brewer 48-yard run (Redford Jones kick)	TU 7–0
1	12:53	VT	Travon McMillian 51-yard run (Joey Slye kick)	Tied 7–7
1	11:54	TU	Zack Langer 2-yard run (Jones kick)	TU 14–7
1	11:42	VT	Isaiah Ford 75-yard pass from Michael Brewer (Slye kick)	Tied 14–14
1	9:53	VT	Slye 27-yard field goal	VT 17–14
1	5:28	VT	Sam Rogers 14-yard run (Slye kick)	VT 24–14
1	2:19	TU	Bishop Louie 9-yard pass from Dane Evans (Jones kick)	VT 24–21
2	13:09	VT	Bucky Hodges 16-yard run (Slye kick)	VT 31–21
2	9:09	VT	McMillian 1-yard run (Slye kick)	VT 38–21
2	7:11	VT	Greg Stroman 67-yard punt return (Slye kick)	VT 45–21
2	2:26	TU	Jones 29-yard field goal	VT 45–24
2	0:20	TU	Brewer 10-yard run (Jones kick)	VT 45–31
3	7:38	VT	Trey Edmunds 1-yard run (Slye kick)	VT 52–31
3	4:11	TU	Evans 9-yard run (Jones kick no good)	VT 52–37
4	11:09	VT	Slye 41-yard field goal	VT 55–37
4	7:35	TU	Josh Atkinson 21-yard pass from Evans (2-point pass good)	VT 55–45
4	3:47	TU	Keyarris Garrett 36-yard pass from Evans (Jones kick)	VT 55–52

== Roster ==
2015 Tulsa Golden Hurricane football team roster
Players
Coaches
Offense

Pos.	#	Name	Class
WR	1	Keyarris Garrett	RSr
WR	2	Keevan Lucas	Jr
TE	3	Mandel Dixon	RSr
RB	4	D'Angelo Brewer	So
QB	5	Jabe Burgess	RFr
WR	6	Chris Showels	RSr
WR	7	Bishop Louie	So
QB	8	Joseph Calcagni	RSr
QB	9	Dane Evans	RJr
QB	10	Chad President	Fr
WR	11	Nigel Carter	So
QB	12	Ryan Rubley	RSo
QB	13	Brad Valentino	Sr
QB	15	Will Hefley	Fr
WR	16	Jarion Anderson	Fr
WR	18	Terrance Ivery	RFr
RB	20	James Flanders	RJr
RB	21	Rowdy Simon	RSo
RB	22	Javon Thomas	Fr
RB	24	Zack Langer	RSr
RB	25	Ramadi Warren	RFr
RB	28	Tavarreon Dickerson	RJr
WR	29	Justin Hobbs	RFr
TE	33	Rob Riederer	RSo
TE	34	Chris Minter	Fr
WR	38	Randall Smith	So
RB	41	Kyle McLaughlin	Fr
RB	42	Daelen McClendon	So
C	51	Blake Browning	Fr
C	52	Billy Lafortune	RSr
C	53	Zac Uhles	RSo
C	57	Dylan Foxworth	RJr
OT	58	Willie Wright	RFr
G	61	Josh Bencke	Jr
G	63	Chris Wallace	RJr
OT	65	Christopher Ivy	Fr
OT	66	Evan Plagg	RSo
G	67	Tristan Wyatt	Fr
OT	71	Mildren Montgomery	RFr
G	72	Tyler Bowling	RFr
C	74	Chandler Miller	RFr
G	75	Alex Pagonis	Jr
G	76	Garrett Stafford	RSr
OT	77	Isaac Johnson	RFr
OT	78	Blake Belcher	RJr
WR	80	Conner Floyd	RSr
TE	82	Tyler Wilson	RJr
WR	84	Avery Gragg	Fr
WR	86	David Snelling	Fr
WR	87	Blake Kitrell	Jr
WR	88	Joshua Atkinson	RJr
TE	89	Payton Prince	RFr

Defense

Pos.	#	Name	Class
S	1	Michael Mudoh	RSr
CB	2	Kerwin Thomas	RSo
LB	3	Khari Harding	Jr
CB	4	Brodrick Umblance	So
LB	5	Tim Quickel	RFr
CB	6	Darrell Williams	RSr
CB	7	Johnell Celistan	Jr
DT	8	Jesse Brubaker	RSo
CB	9	Reggie Robinson	Fr
LB	10	Shawn Norman	RJr
CB	11	David Richardson II	Fr
LB	12	Micheal Thomas	RJr
S	13	Jordan Mitchell	So
S	15	Samuel Gottsch	RFr
LB	20	Zik Asiegbu	RSr
S	21	McKinley Whitfield	Fr
S	22	Jeremy Brady	RJr
CB	23	Will Barrow	Jr
S	24	J. R. Reed	Fr
LB	26	Diamon Cannon	Fr
CB	27	Keidrien Wadley	Fr
LB	28	Craig Suits	RSo
CB	29	Justyn Bell	So
S	30	Cristian Williams	Fr
DE	32	Trevis Gipson	Fr
LB	33	Ronan Rogers	Jr
S	37	James Caligone IV	Fr
LB	38	Matt Linscott	RJr
S	39	Gage Murphy	So
LB	40	Trent Martin	RJr
LB	43	Conner Sherwood	RJr
LB	44	Petera Wilson	So
LB	46	Forrest Harrell III	Fr
LB	47	Blake Abbott	Sr
LB	48	Rylee Simon	Fr
LB	52	Thomas von Borstel	Fr
DE	54	Derrick Alexander	RSr
LB	55	Matt Hickman	RJr
DT	56	Earl Rollins	So
LB	59	C.J. Gooden	RSo
DT	70	Jerry Uwaezuoke	RJr
DE	85	Kolton Shindelar	RSo
DT	89	Thomas Shamet	Jr
DE	90	Frankie Davis	RSo
DE	91	Jake Hanks	RSo
DE	92	Michael Anderson	Fr
DT	93	Suleiman Masumbuko	RSr
DT	94	Michael Rios	RFr
DT	95	Hayden Carman	RJr
DE	96	Myles Mouton	RFr
DE	98	Jeremy Smith	So
DT	99	Derrick Luetjen	RSr

Special teams

Pos.	#	Name	Class
LS	18	Reymundo Higuera	Sr
K	19	Redford Jones	RSo
P	26	Dalton Parks	Jr
K	35	Drew Klingenhagen	Fr
K	39	Preston Soper	RSo
K	40	Brandon Stage	Fr
LS	46	Spencer Shores	Fr
K	49	Tristan Lacey	Fr
LS	60	Tyler Lott	So
K	90	Nathan Walker	Fr

Head coach

- Philip Montgomery (Tarleton State)

Coordinators/assistant coaches

- Brian Norwood (Hawaiʻi)
  Associate head coach, Co-defensive Coordinator, Safeties
- Matt Mattox (Houston)
  Co-offensive coordinator, offensive line coach
- Sterlin Gilbert (Angelo State)
  Co-offensive coordinator, wide receivers, quarterbacks
- Bill Young (Oklahoma State)
  Defensive coordinator, defensive line
- Calvin Lowry (Penn State)
  Receivers coach
- Justin Hill (Rice)
  Running backs coach
- Jermial Ashley (Kansas)
  Defensive line coach
- Joseph Gillespie (Angelo State)
  Linebackers coach
- Aaron Fletcher (East Texas A&M)
  Cornerbacks coach
- Kyle Grooms (Tulsa)
  Director of football operations
- Ravi Savitala (UC Santa Cruz)
  Assistant director of football operations & recruiting
- Clint Rountree (Tulsa)
  Director of high school relations
- D.J. Welte (Arkansas State)
  Director of football video operations
- Dan Bitson (Tulsa)
  Director of player personnel & development
- Mike Bloesch (Houston)
  Offensive quality control
- Luke Olson (Southern Nazarene)
  Defensive quality control
- Nick Graham
  Defensive analyst
- Grant Lester
  Offensive graduate assistant
- Paul Cherry
  Defensive graduate assistant
- Cody Morrison
  Offensive graduate assistant
- Tom Ososkie
  Director of scouting

Legend

- (C) Team captain
- (S) Suspended
- (I) Ineligible
- Injured
- Redshirt

Roster
Last update: September 2015
