= Frank Beamer =

American football player and coach (born 1946)

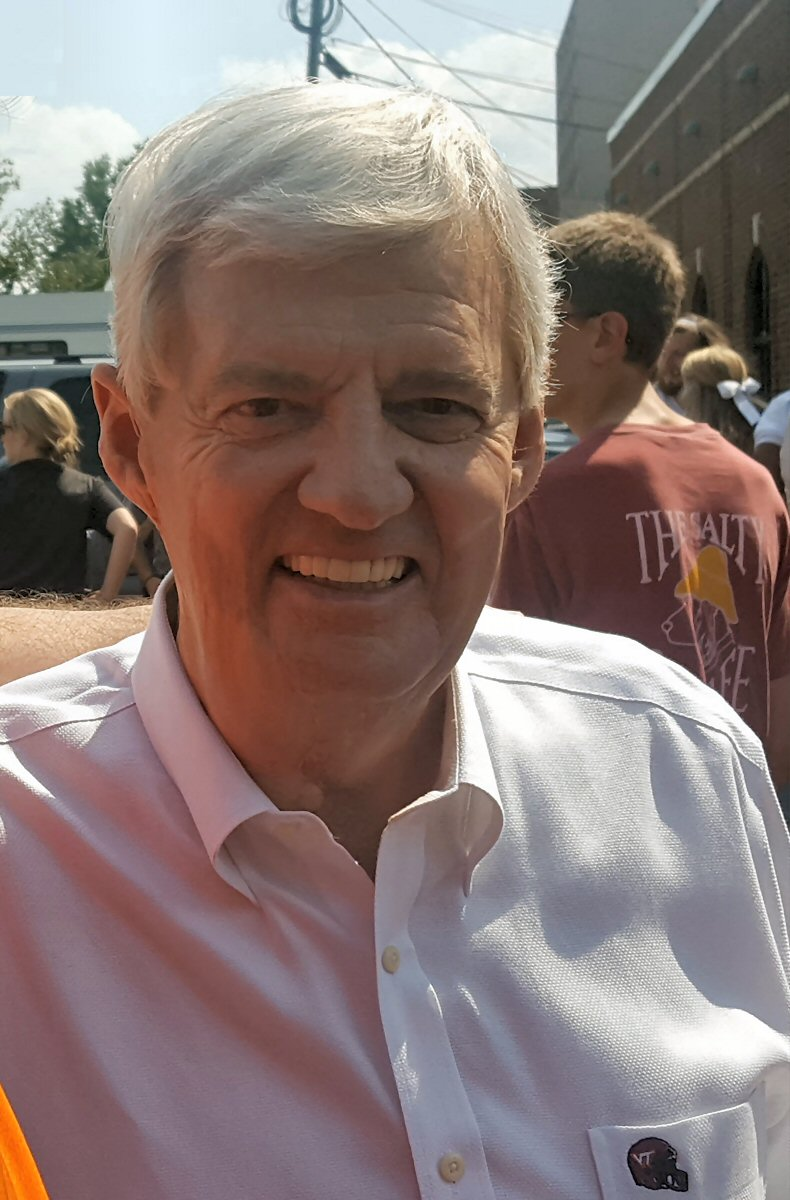
- Beamer in 2016

Current position
- Title: Special Assistant to AD
- Team: Virginia Tech
- Conference: ACC

Biographical details
- Born: October 18, 1946 (age 80); Mount Airy, North Carolina, U.S.

Playing career
- 1966–1968: Virginia Tech
- Position: Cornerback

Coaching career (HC unless noted)
- 1972: Maryland (GA)
- 1973–1976: The Citadel (DL)
- 1977–1978: The Citadel (DC)
- 1979–1980: Murray State (DC)
- 1981–1986: Murray State
- 1987–2015: Virginia Tech

Administrative career (AD unless noted)
- 2016–present: Virginia Tech (special assistant to the AD)

Head coaching record
- Overall: 280–144–4
- Bowls: 11–12
- Tournaments: 0–1 (NCAA D-I-AA playoffs)

Accomplishments and honors

Championships
- 1 OVC (1986); 3 Big East (1995, 1996, 1999); 4 ACC (2004, 2007, 2008, 2010); 5 ACC Coastal Division (2005, 2007, 2008, 2010, 2011)

Awards
- AFCA Coach of the Year (1999); Associated Press Coach of the Year (1999); Bobby Dodd Coach of the Year Award (1999); Eddie Robinson Coach of the Year (1999); George Munger Award (1999); Woody Hayes Trophy Coach of the Year (1999); Paul "Bear" Bryant Award (1999); Walter Camp Coach of the Year Award (1999); Joseph V. Paterno Coach of the Year Award (2010); 3× Big East Coach of the Year (1995, 1996, 1999); 2× ACC Coach of the Year (2004, 2005); Paul “Bear” Bryant Lifetime Achievement Award (2019); College Football 150's Top 25 Coaches in Bowl History (2019); Virginia Tech Hokies No. 25 retired
- College Football Hall of Fame; Inducted in 2018

Franklin Mitchell Beamer (born October 18, 1946) is an American former college football player and coach, most notably for the Virginia Tech Hokies.

Beamer was a defensive cornerback for Virginia Tech from 1966 to 1968. He began coaching as a graduate assistant at the University of Maryland in 1972, and was the head football coach at Murray State University from 1981 to 1986. He became the head football coach at Virginia Tech in 1987, where he stayed for the remainder of his coaching career until 2015. He was one of the longest tenured active coaches in NCAA Division I Football Bowl Subdivision and was the winningest active coach at that level at the time of his retirement. Upon retiring, Beamer accepted a position as special assistant to the Virginia Tech athletic director, where he focuses on athletic development and advancement. He was inducted into the College Football Hall of Fame in 2018.

== Early life and playing career ==
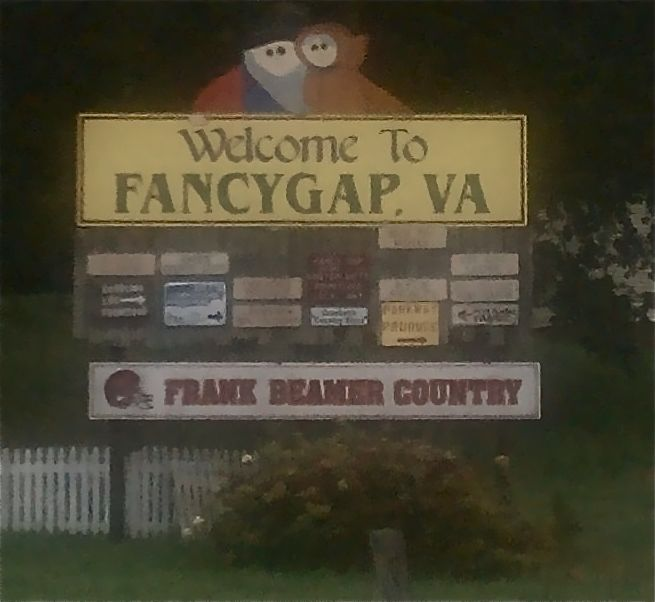
Sign in Fancy Gap, Virginia

Beamer was born in Mount Airy, North Carolina, and grew up on a farm in Fancy Gap, Virginia.

Beamer is a direct descendant of the notorious Allen clan of Carroll County, Virginia. In 1912, during a court trial, his great-uncle, Floyd Allen, fired rounds in a spasm of violence. The courtroom shooting left five people dead, including the judge, a prosecutor, and the county sheriff.

In 1953, at the age of seven, Beamer suffered a life-altering accident. After using a push broom to keep a pile of burning trash in place, he returned the broom to its place in the garage, unaware that it was smoldering. A spark ignited a nearby can of gasoline, which exploded in front of him. His 11-year-old brother Barnett saved him by rolling him around on the ground. He was left with burns on his shoulders, chest, and the right side of his neck. Over the next several years, Beamer underwent dozens of skin graft procedures, leaving him with permanent scarring.

Beamer attended high school in Hillsville, Virginia, and earned 11 varsity letters in three different sports: football, basketball, and baseball. In 1966, he attended Virginia Tech and played football. He was a starting cornerback for 3 years, playing in the 1966 and 1968 Liberty Bowls. He graduated from Virginia Tech in 1969 with Omicron Delta Kappa distinction. After graduating, Beamer was an assistant football coach at Radford High School, while attending Radford University for graduate school.

== Coaching career ==
=== Early coaching positions ===
Beamer began as an assistant at Radford High School from 1969 through 1971. His college coaching experience started in 1972, when he became a graduate assistant for the University of Maryland, College Park. After one season, he became an assistant coach at The Citadel under Bobby Ross. He spent seven seasons at The Citadel, the last two as the defensive coordinator.

=== Murray State ===
Beamer was hired as the defensive coordinator at Murray State University in 1979 under head coach, Mike Gottfried. In 1981, after two seasons as defensive coordinator, he was promoted to head coach. In his six years as head coach, Beamer compiled a record of 42–23–2 (.642). He hired former Murray State defensive back Bud Foster as a graduate assistant in 1981. Foster later joined Beamer's coaching staff at Virginia Tech in 1987.

=== Virginia Tech ===
==== Early years (1987–1992) ====
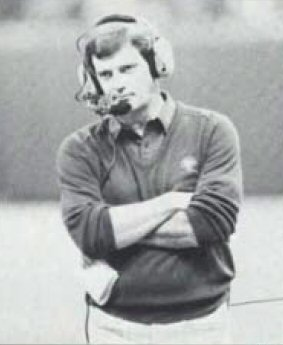
Beamer during the 1987 football season

On December 22, 1986, Beamer was hired as the head coach at Virginia Tech, replacing Bill Dooley, the winningest coach in school history to date. However, Dooley had been forced to resign due to numerous NCAA violations. Beamer signed a four-year contract worth $80,000 annually, hired by Virginia Tech's new athletic director, Dale Baughman, also replacing Dooley in that capacity. Beamer took over a Virginia Tech football program that had reached six bowl games to that point (three under Dooley).

As a result of the violations uncovered under Dooley's watch, the Hokies were limited to 85 total scholarships in 1988 and 1989, and 17 initial scholarships in 1989. The sanctions hampered the Hokies, and Beamer went a combined 5–17 in 1987 and 1988. Beamer's record in his first six seasons was 24-40-2, a win percentage of .385. After the team went 2–8–1 in 1992, athletic director Dave Braine believed in Beamer and thought he deserved more time. It proved to be a wise decision; the Hokies would not suffer another losing season under Beamer's watch. At his hall of fame induction, Beamer said he would have been unlikely to survive his early years had he been coaching in the 2010s.

==== Big East (1993–2003) ====
In 1993, the Hokies would go 9-3 and won the Independence Bowl; at the time, it was only the fourth time in school history that the Hokies had won as many as nine games in a season. The Hokies would go on to a combined record of 75–21 from 1993 to 2000. This included the Hokies' first major-bowl appearances in school history, after the 1995, 1996 and 1999 seasons. The peak year in this stretch was 1999, when the Hokies went 11–0 in the regular season earning a spot to the 2000 Sugar Bowl to play Florida State for the BCS National Championship. Behind the play of quarterback Michael Vick, Virginia Tech led Florida State 29–28 early in the fourth quarter, but lost 46–29. The Hokies finished second in the AP Poll and third in the Coaches' Poll–the highest final rankings in school history, and the highest for a Division I team from Virginia.

In 2000, Virginia Tech had its second straight 11-win season, only losing to Miami when Heisman candidate Michael Vick was suffering a severe ankle sprain and did not start. Using a simple mathematical formula used by College Football Reference to rate every season for every major college football team, it was Tech's best year in history, and remains the best in 2023. (Note: Based on a statistical technique used by College Football Reference that uses unweighted victory margin and strength of schedule, this was the number one ranked team in school history dating back to games played in 1902. It was 19.42 points better than the average Division I team in 2000. Using this computational method, it was 4th best overall college football team in 2000.) As Tech was in a bye week preparing for its annual game with UVA, Beamer says he was contacted by the University of North Carolina and offered the job to replace soon-to-be fired coach Carl Torbush. Beamer reports in his book, Let me be Frank: My Life at Virginia Tech, that he told UNC that he would accept the job on the off-Saturday the week before the UVA game. "It would be one of the biggest mistakes of my life," he says in the book. He visited Chapel Hill on the Sunday following the UVA win to, as he says in the book, "work out the details." "I never signed a contract, and they wanted me to stay that Sunday night and have the introductory press conference on Monday morning....I know they were thinking if we got on that airplane to come home, I would change my mind. And that's exactly what I did." On the eve of the UVA game, Tech had made a very public announcement (including a press release with a statement from Tech president Charles Steger) that Beamer had been offered a $1 million salary if he stayed. What Beamer says made the difference was a $100,000 bump in his assistant coaches' salaries that made them one of the top three paid coaching staffs in the nation, and a commitment to continue expanding the football facilities at his alma mater. He woke up Monday morning in Blacksburg, and wrote in his book that he said to himself "(t)his is my alma mater. This is where I want to be. And this is where we will be as long as I am coaching."

==== ACC (2004–2015) ====
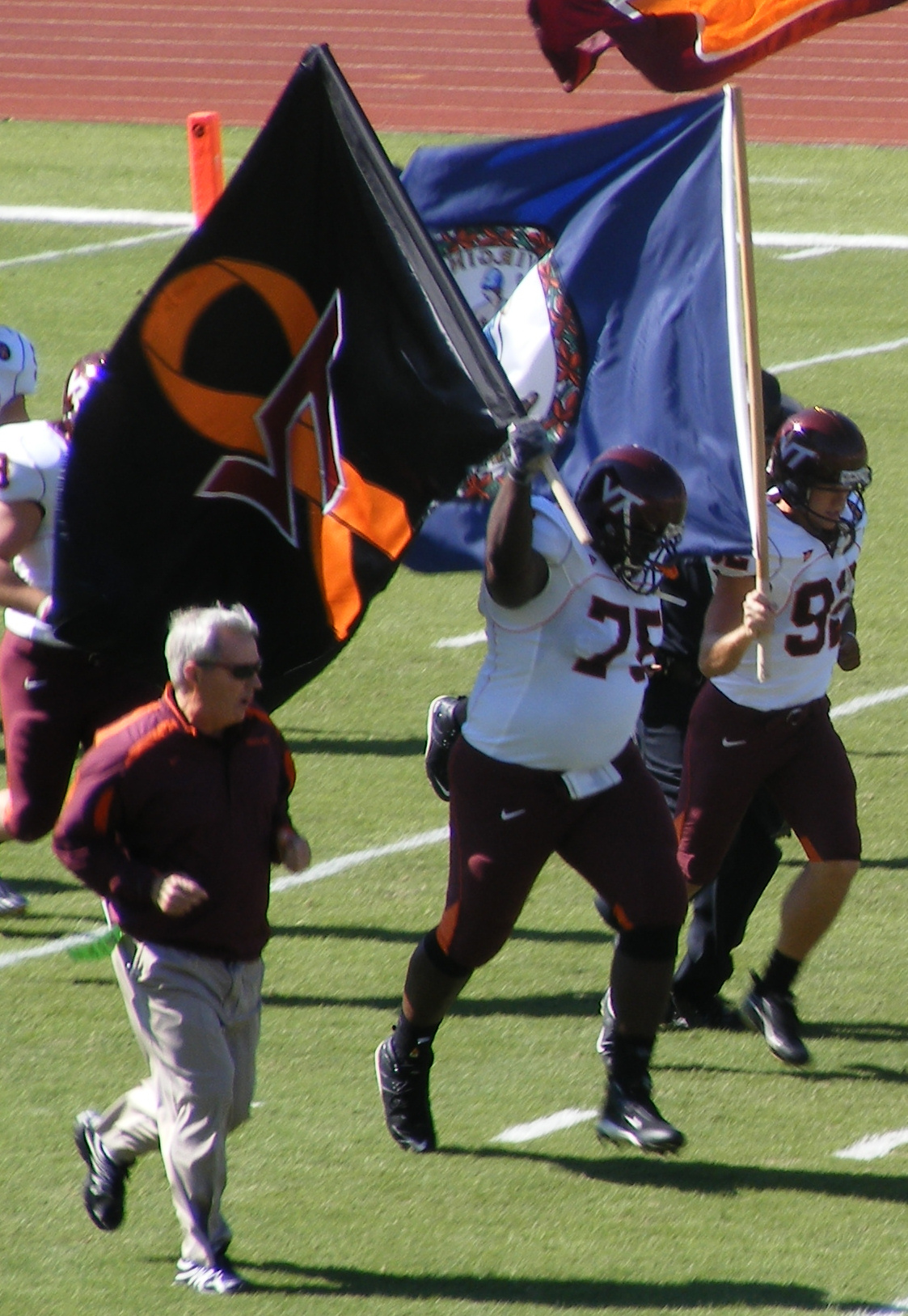
Beamer takes the field with the 2007 Virginia Tech Hokies football team

Virginia Tech continued its bowl eligibility streak into the new millennium and won the 2004 ACC Championship in its first season in the league. Over the course of the next seven seasons, from 2005 to 2011, Virginia Tech won at least 10 games every season. The Hokies were the only team in the country to do so. Beamer's record from 1993 to 2011 was 185–58 for a winning percentage of .761. This was the 4th highest win percentage in the country over this period. Although Virginia Tech went just 28–23 from 2012 to 2015, the Hokies still finished each season with a winning record and a bowl bid.

On November 1, 2015, Beamer announced his retirement from coaching, effective at the end of the 2015 season. He was carried off the field after beating Virginia in the final regular season game to become bowl eligible. Beamer's last game was a 55–52 win over Tulsa in the Independence Bowl on December 26. Memphis' Justin Fuente replaced Beamer as the head football coach at Virginia Tech at the end of the 2015 season.

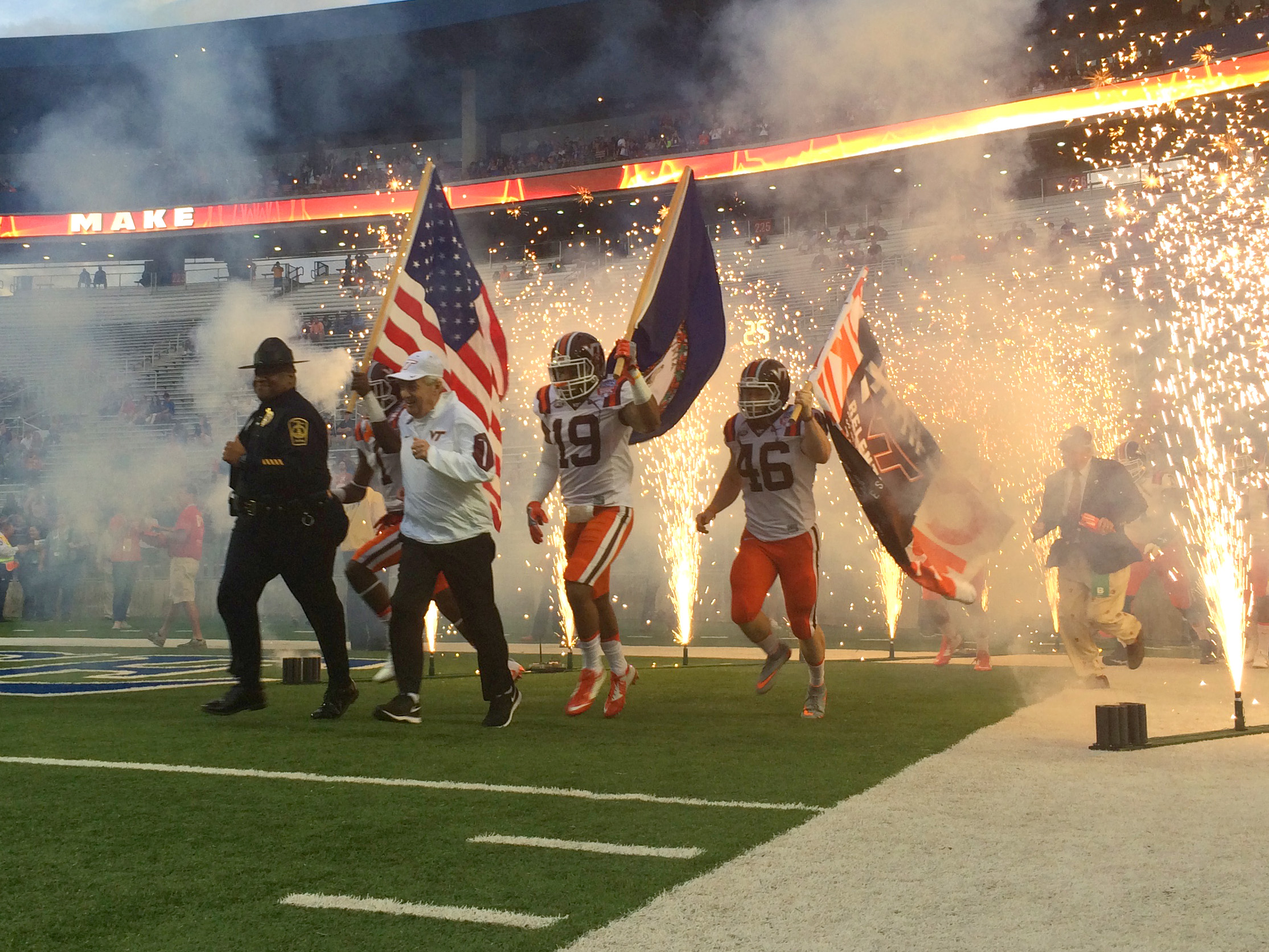
Beamer takes the field with his team for the final time in the 2015 Camping World Independence Bowl in Shreveport, Louisiana, on December 26, 2015.

==== Coaching records and awards ====
Beamer amassed an overall record of 238–121–2 (.663) in his 29 years at the school. His teams went to postseason play after every season from 1993 until his retirement in 2015. The Hokies' consecutive bowl appearances streak—the longest in the nation at the time—continued under his successor, Justin Fuente, until the 2020 season. At the time of his retirement, Beamer owned all of the Hokies' 11-win seasons in school history, as well as all of the seasons in which the Hokies won 10 games on the field. Bill Dooley's last team, in 1986, finished with nine wins on the field, but was awarded a tenth win by forfeit.

Beamer's teams won three Big East championships and four ACC titles. Beamer won many awards over his career. He was named the Big East Coach of the Year three times, in 1995, 1996, and 1999. He also was named the ACC Coach of the Year in 2004 and 2005.

==== Bowl games ====
Beamer led the Virginia Tech Hokies to 23 consecutive bowl games beginning in his seventh season in 1993 until he retired in 2015. It was the second-longest active consecutive bowl streak in the country at the time of his retirement.

Bowl Games as Head Coach of Virginia Tech: 1993–2015
#	Season	Bowl Game	Stadium	Location	Opponent	Result	Record
1	1993	Independence Bowl	Independence Stadium	Shreveport, LA	Indiana Hoosiers	Win 45–20	1–0
2	1994	Gator Bowl	Ben Hill Griffin Stadium	Gainesville, FL	Tennessee Volunteers	Loss 45–23	1–1
3	1995	Sugar Bowl	Louisiana Superdome	New Orleans, LA	Texas Longhorns	Win 28–10	2–1
4	1996	Orange Bowl	Pro Player Stadium	Miami Gardens, FL	Nebraska Cornhuskers	Loss 41–21	2–2
5	1997	Gator Bowl	Alltel Stadium	Jacksonville, FL	North Carolina Tar Heels	Loss 42–3	2–3
6	1998	Music City Bowl	Vanderbilt Stadium	Nashville, TN	Alabama Crimson Tide	Win 38–7	3–3
7	1999	Sugar Bowl	Louisiana Superdome	New Orleans, LA	Florida State Seminoles	Loss 46–29	3–4
8	2000	Gator Bowl	Alltel Stadium	Jacksonville, FL	Clemson Tigers	Win 41–20	4–4
9	2001	Gator Bowl	Alltel Stadium	Jacksonville, FL	Florida State Seminoles	Loss 30–17	4–5
10	2002	San Francisco Bowl	Pacific Bell Park	San Francisco, CA	Air Force Falcons	Win 20–13	5–5
11	2003	Insight Bowl	Bank One Ballpark	Phoenix, AZ	California Golden Bears	Loss 52–49	5–6
12	2004	Sugar Bowl	Louisiana Superdome	New Orleans, LA	Auburn Tigers	Loss 16–13	5–7
13	2005	Gator Bowl	Alltel Stadium	Jacksonville, FL	Louisville Cardinals	Win 35–24	6–7
14	2006	Chick-fil-A Bowl	Georgia Dome	Atlanta, GA	Georgia Bulldogs	Loss 31–24	6–8
15	2007	Orange Bowl	Pro Player Stadium	Miami Gardens, FL	Kansas Jayhawks	Loss 24–21	6–9
16	2008	Orange Bowl	Pro Player Stadium	Miami Gardens, FL	Cincinnati Bearcats	Win 20–7	7–9
17	2009	Chick-fil-A Bowl	Georgia Dome	Atlanta, GA	Tennessee Volunteers	Win 37–14	8–9
18	2010	Orange Bowl	Pro Player Stadium	Miami Gardens, FL	Stanford Cardinal	Loss 40–12	8–10
19	2011	Sugar Bowl	Mercedes-Benz Superdome	New Orleans, LA	Michigan Wolverines	Loss 23–20	8–11
20	2012	Russell Athletic Bowl	Florida Citrus Bowl Stadium	Orlando, FL	Rutgers Scarlet Knights	Win 13–10	9–11
21	2013	Sun Bowl	Sun Bowl Stadium	El Paso, TX	UCLA Bruins	Loss 42–12	9–12
22	2014	Military Bowl *	Navy–Marine Corps Memorial Stadium	Annapolis, MD	Cincinnati Bearcats	Win 33–17	10–12
23	2015	Independence Bowl	Independence Stadium	Shreveport, LA	Tulsa Golden Hurricane	Win 55–52	11–12

* Assistant Head Coach, Shane Beamer was the acting Head Coach for the 2014 Military Bowl.

== Retirement and post-coaching career ==
On November 1, 2015, after 29 seasons as head coach of Virginia Tech, Beamer announced his retirement from coaching, effective at the end of the 2015 season. During his tenure, he coached the Hokies to 23 consecutive bowl games, including a national championship appearance, along with seven conference championship titles. At the time of his retirement, he was the winningest active coach in Division I FBS with 280 career victories. and is the sixth winningest coach in history at the Division I FBS level.

=== Special assistant to the Virginia Tech athletic director ===
In late 2015, shortly after announcing his retirement at the end of the season, Beamer signed an eight-year contract with Virginia Tech, serving as a special assistant to Whit Babcock, director of athletics at Virginia Tech, focusing on athletic development and advancement.

=== College Football Playoff Committee ===
On January 17, 2017, Beamer was appointed to the College Football Playoff Committee. Beamer joined the 13-member panel, which was formed when the College Football Playoff was implemented in 2013. It is a 3-year appointment and he was the 14th person to be named to the committee. The members meet each of the final six weeks of the regular season to create a weekly poll of the top 25 teams in the country. The panel determines the top four college football teams for the playoff games to decide the national champion.

== Legacy ==
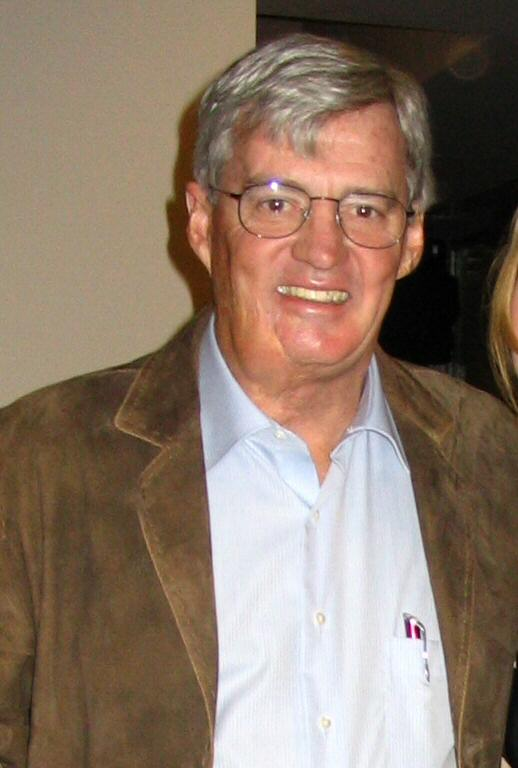
Beamer in 2006

=== Hall of Fame Inductions ===
Hall of Fame	Year
Virginia Tech Hall of Fame	1997
Murray State Hall of Fame	2004
Ohio Valley Conference Hall of Fame	2016
Virginia Sports Hall of Fame	2017
Chick-fil-A Peach Bowl Hall of Fame	2017
Sun Bowl Legend	2017
College Football Hall of Fame	2018
Orange Bowl Hall of Fame	2018
The Virginia High School Hall of Fame	2020

=== Honors and tributes ===
==== "Beamerball" ====
During Beamer's tenure at Virginia Tech, putting points on the scoreboard has become a full team effort with the offensive, defensive and special teams units. Often when the team scores one or more non-offensive touchdowns, the style of play is described as "Beamerball". Since Beamer's first season in 1987, a player at every position on the defensive unit has scored at least one touchdown, and 35 different players have scored touchdowns on Virginia Tech's special teams.

==== Beamer Way ====
On August 6, 2015, Virginia Tech renamed Spring Road to Beamer Way in honor of Beamer. Located on the west side of Lane Stadium, it is the primary access route to the campus sports facilities. The Virginia Tech Athletics Department also changed its mailing address to 25 Beamer Way to commemorate his jersey number as a player at the school.

==== #25 Beamer Jersey ====
Before the beginning of the 2016 football season, new coach Justin Fuente and his staff collaborated on ideas of how to honor Beamer during the season. On August 29, 2016, the team announced that as an homage to Beamer's transcendent contributions and dedication to special teams, one deserving special teams player would be chosen to wear the number 25 jersey for each game of the 2016 season, earning the title Special Teams Player of the Week. Beamer wore the number 25 when he played at Virginia Tech as a cornerback from 1966 to 1968. The honorary jersey became so popular with the players, fans, and coaches that the team continued the tradition beyond the 2016 season.

==== Frank Beamer Day ====
February 4, 2016, was declared Frank Beamer Day in Virginia by Governor Terry McAuliffe. In a ceremony on the steps of the Virginia State Capitol in front of a crowd of Virginia Tech students, faculty, and alumni—including his wife, Cheryl Beamer, government affairs directors, Paul Rice and Harvey Creasey III, and university president, Timothy Sands—Governor McAuliffe presented Beamer with a framed certificate to honor his achievements as the head coach of the Virginia Tech football program.

==== Beamer–Lawson Indoor Practice Facility' ====
On October 6, 2018, Virginia Tech renamed its indoor practice facility to the Beamer–Lawson Indoor Practice Facility. The building, constructed in 2016 was renamed for Beamer and the family of John Lawson, a former rector of the Virginia Tech Board of Visitors and longtime donor

==== Frank Beamer Statue ====
On October 6, 2018, a permanent bronze statue, honoring Beamer's legendary coaching career at Virginia Tech, was unveiled on Moody Plaza outside the southwest entrance to Lane Stadium, on Virginia Tech's campus.

==== Ut Prosim Medal ====
On May 11, 2023, and Virginia Tech's spring commencement ceremony, Beamer received the Ut Prosim Medal, the university's highest honor, which recognizes "those who embody service, sacrifice, generosity, and esteemed accomplishment that reflect honor on both the individual and the university".

==== Other honors ====
- On July 29, 2016, Beamer was initiated into Alpha Sigma Phi fraternity at the organization's 54th Grand Chapter in Norfolk, Virginia.
- On February 1, 2017, Beamer accepted an invitation from Virginia Tech Men's Basketball Coach, Buzz Williams to be an honorary assistant basketball coach and travel with the team for a game at the University of Virginia.
- On September 3, 2017, Beamer served as an honorary captain for the Virginia Tech football team for the season opener against West Virginia played at FedEx Field in Landover, MD.
- On January 25, 2018, the Virginia House of Delegates issued a joint resolution (2018- No.158) commending Hall of Fame Coach Frank Beamer on his many lifelong accomplishments.
- On January 9, 2019, Beamer was awarded the Paul "Bear" Bryant Lifetime Achievement Award at a ceremony in Houston, Texas. Beamer became the award's 23rd recipient.
- On December 10, 2019, The College Football 150 ranked Beamer #19 on its Top 25 Coaches in Bowl History list. Beamer was also listed #45 on the 150 greatest coaches in college football's 150-year history.

== Personal life ==
Beamer married Cheryl (née Oakley) on April 1, 1972. The two met on a blind date, arranged by Cheryl's sister Sheila, while Beamer was a senior at Virginia Tech. They have two children, Shane and Casey, and six grandchildren. His son, Shane played football at Virginia Tech as a long snapper, and was a member of the 1999 team that played for the national championship. After assistant coaching stops at four different universities, Shane was hired by Virginia Tech in 2011 as the running backs coach and associate head coach. Shane left Virginia Tech in 2015 to be the running backs coach at the University of Georgia and later became an assistant at Oklahoma University. He is currently the head coach at the University of South Carolina.

In 2006, Beamer and his wife Cheryl published the children's book Yea, It's a Hokie Game Day! under Virginia publisher Mascot Books, Inc.

After the April 16, 2007, Virginia Tech shooting, Beamer was a powerful voice in the Blacksburg community, stating that the most important thing that the Virginia Tech and surrounding community could do was to disallow the act of violence to define the university. Beamer is quoted as saying, "We can't let one person destroy what goes on here every day, the caring, the thoughtfulness. We can't let one person destroy that."

== Head coaching record ==
Year	Team	Overall	Conference	Standing	Bowl/playoffs	Coaches^{#}	AP^{°}
Murray State Racers (Ohio Valley Conference) (1981–1986)
1981	Murray State	8–3	5–3	T–2nd			9
1982	Murray State	4–7	2–5	T–5th			
1983	Murray State	7–4	4–3	4th			
1984	Murray State	9–2	5–2	T–2nd			13
1985	Murray State	7–3–1	5–2	T–2nd			17
1986	Murray State	7–4–1	6–1	T–1st	L NCAA Division I-AA First Round		18
Murray State:		42–23–2	27–16	AP rankings from NCAA Division I-AA Poll			
Virginia Tech Hokies (NCAA Division I-A Independent) (1987–1990)
1987	Virginia Tech	2–9					
1988	Virginia Tech	3–8					
1989	Virginia Tech	6–4–1					
1990	Virginia Tech	6–5				25	
Virginia Tech Hokies (Big East Conference) (1991–2003)
1991	Virginia Tech	5–6	1–0	‡			
1992	Virginia Tech	2–8–1	1–4	‡			
1993	Virginia Tech	9–3	4–3	4th	W Independence	20	22
1994	Virginia Tech	8–4	5–2	2nd	L Gator^{†}	24	
1995	Virginia Tech	10–2	6–1	T–1st	W Sugar^{†}	9	10
1996	Virginia Tech	10–2	6–1	T–1st	L Orange^{†}	12	13
1997	Virginia Tech	7–5	5–2	2nd	L Gator		
1998	Virginia Tech	9–3	5–2	T–2nd	W Music City	19	23
1999	Virginia Tech	11–1	7–0	1st	L Sugar^{†}	3	2
2000	Virginia Tech	11–1	6–1	2nd	W Gator	6	6
2001	Virginia Tech	8–4	4–3	T–3rd	L Gator	18	18
2002	Virginia Tech	10–4	3–4	T–4th	W San Francisco	14	18
2003	Virginia Tech	8–5	4–3	4th	L Insight		
Virginia Tech Hokies (Atlantic Coast Conference) (2004–2015)
2004	Virginia Tech	10–3	7–1	1st	L Sugar^{†}	10	10
2005	Virginia Tech	11–2	7–1	1st (Coastal)	W Gator	7	7
2006	Virginia Tech	10–3	6–2	2nd (Coastal)	L Chick-fil-A	18	19
2007	Virginia Tech	11–3	7–1	1st (Coastal)	L Orange^{†}	9	9
2008	Virginia Tech	10–4	5–3	T–1st (Coastal)	W Orange^{†}	14	15
2009	Virginia Tech	10–3	6–2	2nd (Coastal)	W Peach	10	10
2010	Virginia Tech	11–3	8–0	1st (Coastal)	L Orange^{†}	15	16
2011	Virginia Tech	11–3	7–1	1st (Coastal)	L Sugar^{†}	17	21
2012	Virginia Tech	7–6	4–4	4th (Coastal)	W Russell Athletic		
2013	Virginia Tech	8–5	5–3	T–2nd (Coastal)	L Sun		
2014	Virginia Tech	7–6	3–5	T–5th (Coastal)	W Military		
2015	Virginia Tech	7–6	4–4	T–4th (Coastal)	W Independence		
Virginia Tech:		238–121–2	126–53	‡ The Big East did not begin full round-robin play until 1993			
Total:		280–144–4					
National championship Conference title Conference division title or championship game berth
^{†}Indicates Bowl Coalition, Bowl Alliance or BCS bowl.; ^{#}Rankings from final Coaches Poll.; ^{°}Rankings from final AP Poll.

== See also ==
- List of college football career coaching wins leaders
