= D'Angelo Brewer =

American football player (born 1996)

No. 4
- Position: Running back

Personal information
- Born: January 6, 1996 (age 30); Kankakee, Illinois
- Listed height: 5 ft 9 in (1.75 m)
- Listed weight: 185 lb (84 kg)

Career information
- High school: Central (Tulsa, OK)
- College: University of Tulsa (2014–2017)

Awards and highlights
- First-team All-AAC (2017); Second-team All-AAC (2016)

D'Angelo Brewer (born January 6, 1996) is an American former college football player.

== Early life ==
Brewer was born in 1996 in Kankakee, Illinois, the son of Samuel Cotton and Keyatta Stampley. He attended Central High School in Tulsa, Oklahoma.

== College career ==
Brewer joined the Tulsa football team in 2014. He gained 837 rushing yards as a sophomore in 2015 and 1,435 as a junior in 2016. On September 24, 2016, he rushed for 252 yards against Fresno State.

As a senior, he gained 262 rushing yards against Louisiana–Lafayette on September 9. During the 2017 regular season, Brewer ranked fifth among all Division I FBS players with 1,517 rushing yards.

On November 16, 2017, in a game against South Florida, Brewer surpassed Marlon Mack to become the American Athletic Conference's all-time leading rusher, and surpassed Tarrion Adams to become Tulsa's all-time leading rusher.

=== Statistics ===
Teams		Games		Rushing			
Season	Team	GP	GS	Att	Yds	Avg	TD
2014	Tulsa	12	1	39	128	3.3	1
2015	Tulsa	11	9	162	837	5.2	6
2016	Tulsa	12	7	264	1,435	5.4	7
2017	Tulsa	11	11	288	1,517	5.3	9
Career		46	28	753	3,917	5.2	23
