= 2014 Military Bowl =

NCAA football bowl game

2014 Military Bowl presented by Northrop Grumman
- 7th Military Bowl
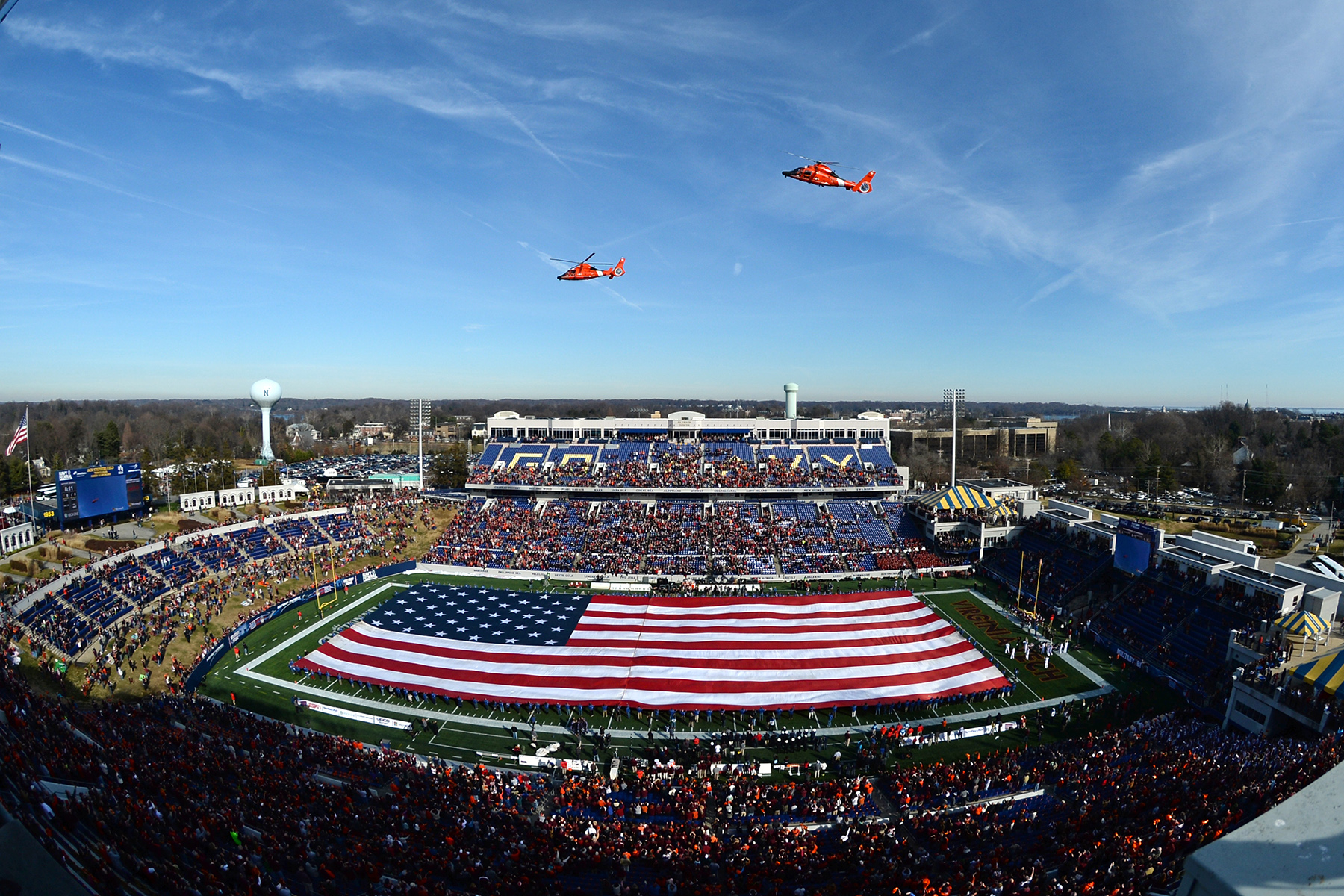
- Coast Guard helicopters fly over Navy-Marine Corps Memorial Stadium at the start of the Military Bowl
Cincinnati Bearcats	Virginia Tech Hokies
(9–3)	(6–6)
The American	ACC
17	33
Head coach: Tommy Tuberville	Head coach: Frank Beamer
	1	2	3	4	Total
Cincinnati	7	3	0	7	17
Virginia Tech	7	6	14	6	33
- Date: December 27, 2014
- Season: 2014
- Stadium: Navy–Marine Corps Memorial Stadium
- Location: Annapolis, Maryland
- MVP: Virginia Tech RB J. C. Coleman
- Favorite: Cincinnati by 2
- Referee: Kevin Stine (Sun Belt)
- Attendance: 34,277
- Payout: US$1,000,000

United States TV coverage
- Network: ESPN/ESPN Radio
- Announcers: Beth Mowins, Joey Galloway, & Paul Carcaterra (ESPN); Eamon McAnaney & Jay Walker (ESPN Radio)

The 2014 Military Bowl was a college football bowl game played on December 27, 2014 at Navy–Marine Corps Memorial Stadium on the campus of the United States Naval Academy in Annapolis, Maryland in the United States. The seventh annual Military Bowl, it pitted the American Athletic Conference co-champion Cincinnati Bearcats against the Virginia Tech Hokies of the Atlantic Coast Conference. It was one of the 2014–15 bowl games will conclude the 2014 FBS football season. The game started at 1:00 p.m. EST and aired on ESPN. It was sponsored by aerospace and defense technology company Northrop Grumman and is officially known as the Military Bowl Presented by Northrop Grumman.

== Teams ==
The game featured the Virginia Tech Hokies of the Atlantic Coast Conference against the American Athletic Conference co-champion Cincinnati Bearcats. Whit Babcock, the Hokies' director of athletics, previously held the same position at Cincinnati and hired Bearcats' coach Tommy Tuberville.

This was 11th overall meeting between these two teams, with series tied 5–5 before the game. The previous time these two teams met was in 2012. This was also the third bowl game between these two teams, the others being the 1947 Sun Bowl and the 2009 Orange Bowl.

=== Cincinnati Bearcats ===
After finishing their regular season with a 9–3 record and winning the American Athletic Conference co-championship, the Bearcats accepted their invitation to play in the game.

=== Virginia Tech Hokies ===
After finishing their regular season with a 6–6 record, the Hokies accepted their invitation to play in the game.

== Game summary ==
=== Scoring summary ===
Scoring summary

Quarter	Time	Drive			Team	Scoring information	Score	
Quarter	Time	Plays	Yards	TOP	Team	Scoring information	CIN	VT
1	5:47	7	89	2:50	CIN	Chris Moore 31-yard touchdown reception from Gunner Kiel, Andrew Gantz kick good	7	0
1	3:51	6	64	1:56	VT	J. C. Coleman 1-yard touchdown run, Joey Slye kick good	7	7
2	12:55	7	10	2:45	VT	45-yard field goal by Joey Slye	7	10
2	0:36	13	86	6:23	CIN	25-yard field goal by Andrew Gantz	10	10
2	0:00	4	20	0:36	VT	49-yard field goal by Joey Slye	10	13
3	11:05	11	75	3:55	VT	Ryan Malleck 1-yard touchdown reception from Michael Brewer, Joey Slye kick good	10	20
3	9:16	–	–	–	VT	Fumble recovery returned 12 yards for touchdown by Greg Stroman, Joey Slye kick good	10	27
4	13:20	6	21	2:27	VT	38-yard field goal by Joey Slye	10	30
4	10:35	7	81	2:45	CIN	Chris Moore 43-yard touchdown reception from Michael Colosimo, Andrew Gantz kick good	17	30
4	8:52	6	27	1:43	VT	33-yard field goal by Joey Slye	17	33
"TOP" = time of possession. For other American football terms, see Glossary of American football.							17	33

=== Statistics ===
Statistics	CIN	VT
First downs	19	18
Plays–yards	70–489	69–334
Rushes–yards	33–144	44–210
Passing yards	345	124
Passing: Comp–Att–Int	18–37–2	15–25–1
Time of possession	29:04	30:56
