= Greg Stroman =

American football player (born 1996)

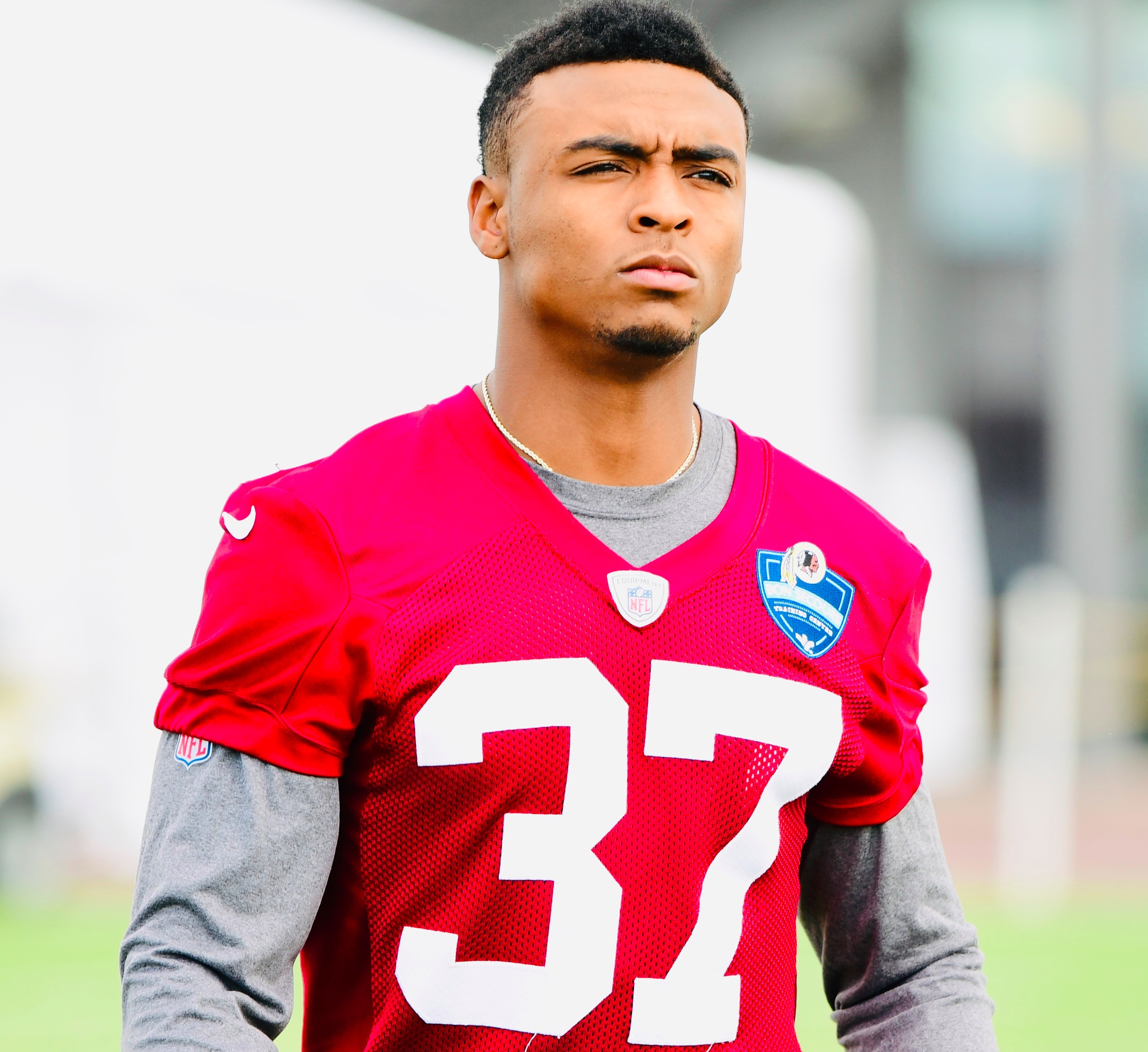
- Stroman with the Washington Redskins in 2019

Profile
- Position: Cornerback

Personal information
- Born: March 8, 1996 (age 30); Warrenton, Virginia, U.S.
- Listed height: 5 ft 11 in (1.80 m)
- Listed weight: 180 lb (82 kg)

Career information
- High school: Stonewall Jackson (Bull Run, Virginia)
- College: Virginia Tech (2014–2017)
- NFL draft: 2018: 7th round, 241st overall pick

Career history
- Washington Redskins / Football Team (2018–2020); Buffalo Bills (2021)*; Los Angeles Rams (2021)*; Chicago Bears (2022–2023); New York Giants (2024)
- * Offseason or practice squad member only

Awards and highlights
- First-team All-ACC (2017); Second-team All-ACC (2016)

Career NFL statistics as of 2024
- Total tackles: 75
- Sacks: 1
- Forced fumbles: 1
- Fumble recoveries: 1
- Pass deflections: 6
- Interceptions: 3
- Stats at Pro Football Reference

Gregory O'Neill Stroman Jr. (born March 8, 1996) is an American professional football cornerback. He most recently played for the New York Giants of the National Football League (NFL). He played college football for the Virginia Tech Hokies and was selected by the Washington Redskins in the seventh round of the 2018 NFL draft.

== Early life ==
While living in Bristow, Virginia, Stroman attended Stonewall Jackson High School in Manassas, Virginia. At Stonewall Jackson, he was a first-team 6A All-State selection. A 3-star recruit, Stroman committed to play football for Virginia Tech over offers from Campbell, Duke, Norfolk State, Old Dominion, UMass, Virginia, and Wisconsin.

== College career ==
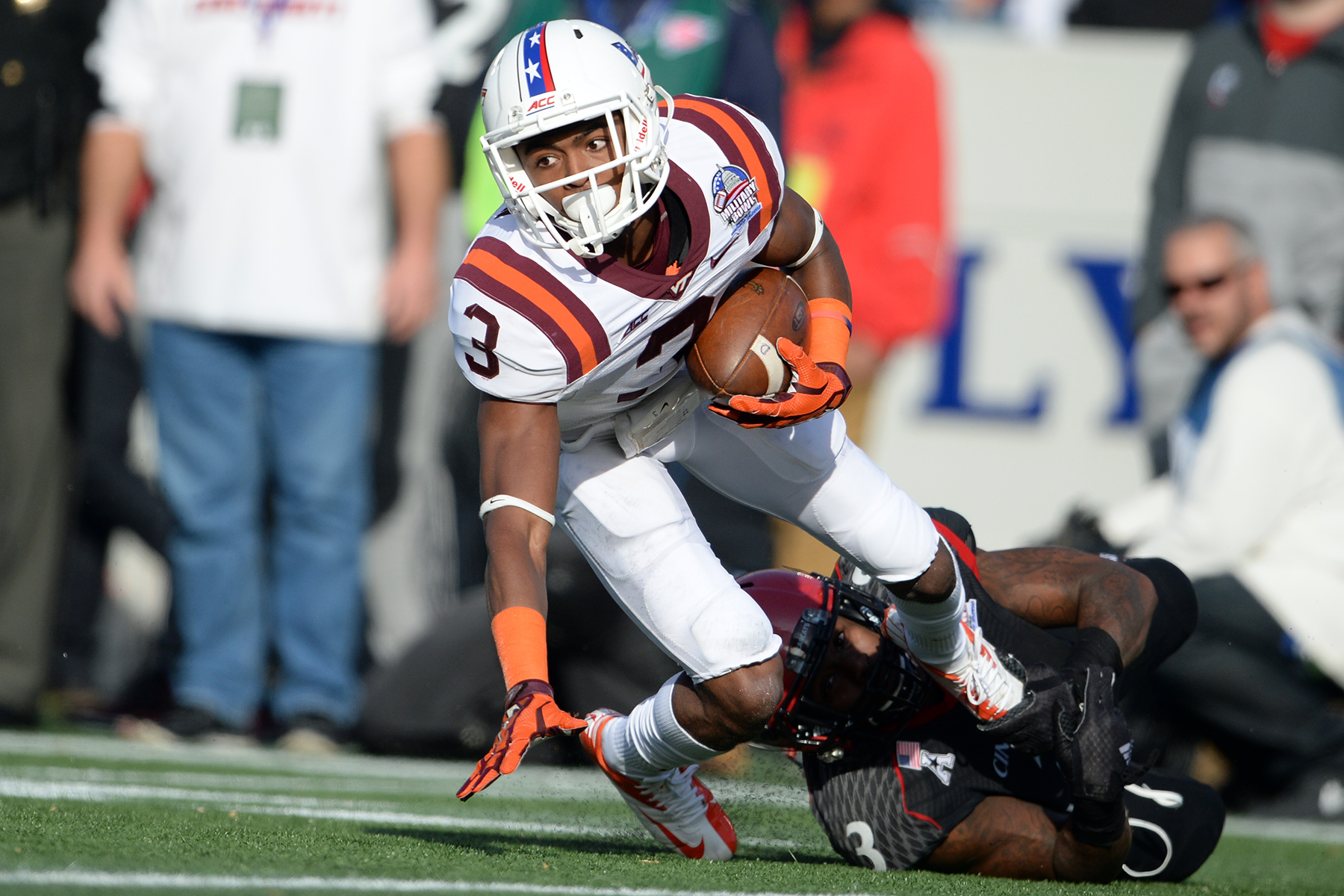
Stroman (left) playing in the 2014 Military Bowl.

As a freshman, Stroman made an immediate impact for the Hokies on special teams as he fielded 36 punts for 249 yards. In his sophomore season, he recorded 27 punt returns for 109 yards and collecting 24 tackles on defense. In his junior season, Stroman tied for second in the Atlantic Coast Conference in both pass breakups (11, including one for a touchdown) and interceptions (four for 47 yards). He added 20 total tackles and 36 punts returned for 397 yards and two touchdowns on special teams. Stroman ranks second all-time in Virginia Tech history with six career return scores, trailing just DeAngelo Hall (seven). In the 2015 Independence Bowl against Tulsa, he had a career-long punt return of 67 yards.

== Professional career ==
Pre-draft measurables
Height	Weight	Arm length	Hand span	Wingspan	40-yard dash	10-yard split	20-yard split	20-yard shuttle	Three-cone drill	Vertical jump	Broad jump	Bench press
5 ft 11 in (1.80 m)	182 lb (83 kg)	29 7/8 in (0.76 m)	8 3/4 in (0.22 m)	5 ft 11 1/8 in (1.81 m)	4.48 s	1.59 s	2.62 s	4.43 s	7.02 s	34.0 in (0.86 m)	9 ft 7 in (2.92 m)	16 reps
All values from NFL Combine/Pro Day

=== Washington Redskins / Football Team ===
Stroman was drafted by the Washington Redskins in the seventh round, 241st overall, of the 2018 NFL draft. In his rookie season, Stroman played in 15 games, recording 38 tackles, 4 passes defended, 1 interception and 1 forced fumble.

On September 10, 2019, Stroman was waived/injured by the Redskins and reverted to the team's injured reserve list the next day. For the 2020 season he played in a few games before being placed on injured reserve again on October 16, 2020. Stroman was released on August 17, 2021.

=== Buffalo Bills ===
On December 2, 2021, Stroman was signed to the practice squad of the Buffalo Bills. He was released on December 9, 2021.

=== Los Angeles Rams ===
On December 16, 2021, Stroman was signed to the Los Angeles Rams practice squad. He was released on December 28.

=== Chicago Bears ===
On April 21, 2022, Stroman signed a one-year contract with the Chicago Bears. He was released on August 30, 2022. He was re-signed to the practice squad on December 28, 2022. He signed a reserve/future contract on January 26, 2023.

On August 29, 2023, Stroman was released by the Bears and re-signed to the practice squad. He was promoted to the active roster on September 14. Stroman was released on November 8 and re-signed to the practice squad two days later. He was signed to the active roster on January 6, 2024.

Stroman was released by the Bears on August 27, 2024.

=== New York Giants ===
On October 1, 2024, Stroman signed with the New York Giants practice squad. He was promoted to the active roster on December 10.
