= Joey Slye =

American football player (born 1996)

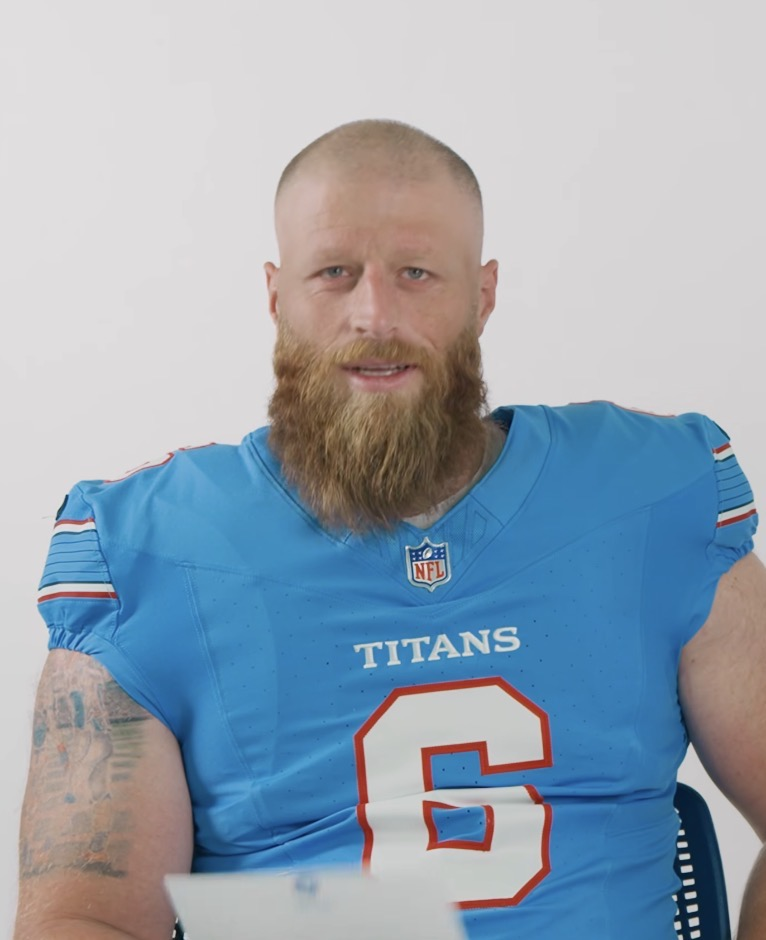
- Slye in 2026

No. 6 – Tennessee Titans
- Position: Placekicker
- Roster status: Active

Personal information
- Born: April 10, 1996 (age 30); Albuquerque, New Mexico, U.S.
- Listed height: 5 ft 11 in (1.80 m)
- Listed weight: 228 lb (103 kg)

Career information
- High school: North Stafford (Stafford, Virginia)
- College: Virginia Tech (2014–2017)
- NFL draft: 2018: undrafted

Career history
- New York Giants (2019)*; Carolina Panthers (2019–2020); Houston Texans (2021); San Francisco 49ers (2021); Washington Football Team / Commanders (2021–2023); Jacksonville Jaguars (2024)*; New England Patriots (2024); Tennessee Titans (2025–present)
- * Offseason or practice squad member only

Awards and highlights
- Third-team All-ACC (2016)

Career NFL statistics as of Week 10, 2026
- Field goals made: 190
- Field goals attempted: 231
- Field goal %: 82.3%
- Extra points made: 203
- Extra points attempted: 223
- Extra point %: 91.0%
- Points: 773
- Longest field goal: 63
- Touchbacks: 369
- Stats at Pro Football Reference

Joseph David Slye (born April 10, 1996) is an American professional football placekicker for the Tennessee Titans of the National Football League (NFL). He played college football for the Virginia Tech Hokies and signed with the New York Giants as an undrafted free agent in 2019. Slye has also been a member of the Carolina Panthers, Houston Texans, San Francisco 49ers, Washington Football Team / Commanders, Jacksonville Jaguars, and New England Patriots. He holds the franchise record for longest field goal for both the Commanders and the Patriots, at 61 yards and 63 yards respectively.

== Early life ==
Slye was born in Albuquerque, New Mexico, but grew up in Stafford, Virginia. He attended North Stafford High School, where he played high school football. Slye was named all-state as both a kicker and as a linebacker for the Wolverines.

== College career ==
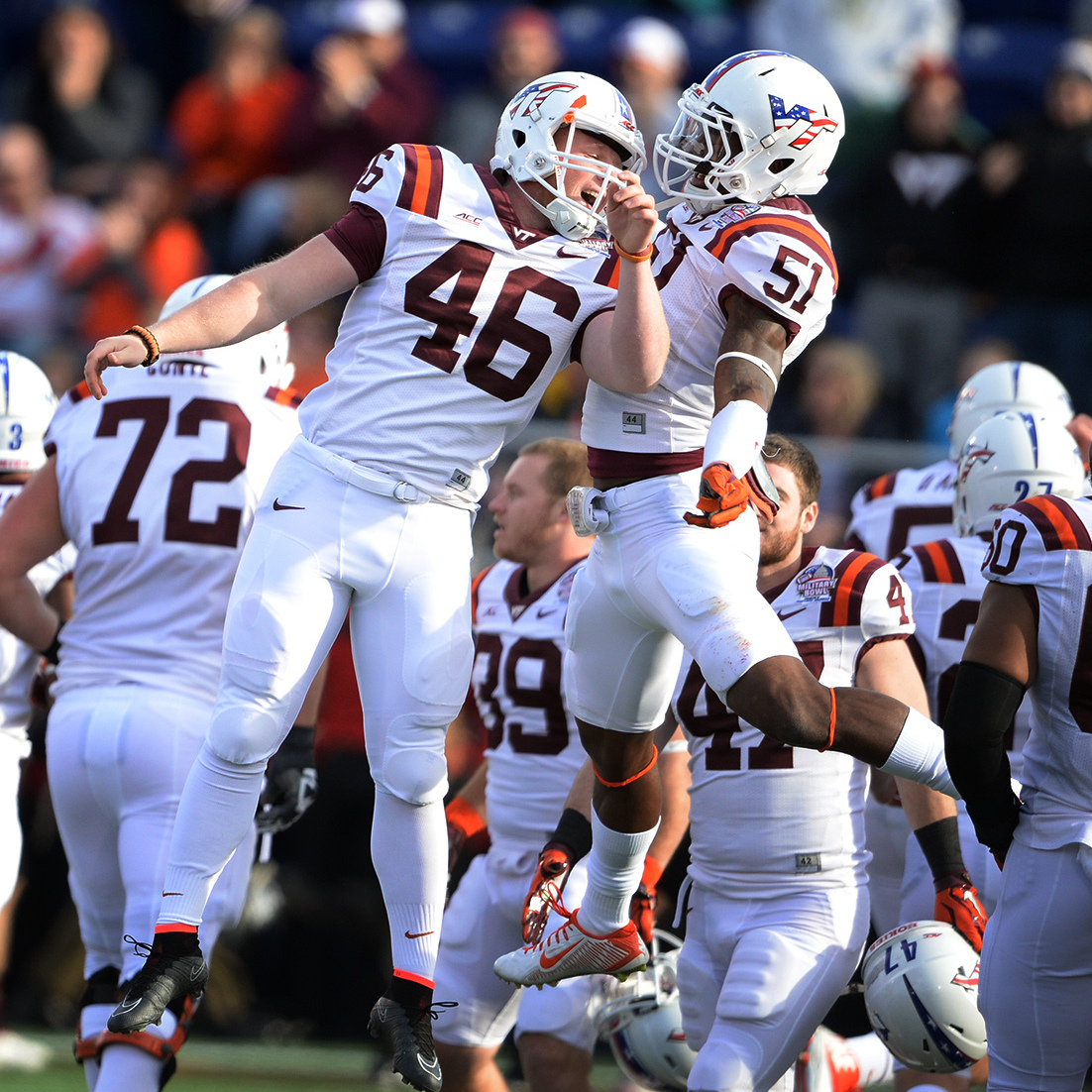
Slye (46) at the 2014 Military Bowl

Slye played four seasons for the Virginia Tech Hokies, opting to join the team as a walk-on over a scholarship offer from James Madison. He made 78 of 108 field goal attempts (72.2 percent) and 169 of 172 of extra point attempts (98.3 percent).

== Professional career ==
Pre-draft measurables
Height	Weight	Arm length	Hand span	Wingspan	Bench press
5 ft 10 in (1.78 m)	213 lb (97 kg)	29 3/8 in (0.75 m)	8 1/8 in (0.21 m)	5 ft 11 1/2 in (1.82 m)	21 reps
All values from Pro Day

After going unselected in the 2018 NFL draft, Slye participated in a tryout for the Tampa Bay Buccaneers and received interest from the Cleveland Browns, but was not signed by either team.

=== New York Giants ===
Slye signed with the New York Giants on May 6, 2019, but was released eight days later. He was re-signed by the Giants on July 24, but was waived three days later.

=== Carolina Panthers ===
==== 2019 season ====
Slye signed with the Carolina Panthers on August 1, 2019. Although originally brought in to serve as a "camp leg", Slye made seven of eight field goal attempts in the preseason, including three from beyond 50 yards out. He was named the Panthers' kicker for the 2019 season after Graham Gano was placed on injured reserve.

Slye made his NFL debut on September 8, 2019, against the Los Angeles Rams, missing his first career field goal attempt from 53 yards out but hitting his next two tries from 46 and 52 yards out while making all three of his extra point attempts. Slye was named the National Football Conference (NFC) Special Teams Player of the Week for Week 4 after going 3–3 on field goal attempts, including a 55-yarder, on September 29, 2019, against the Houston Texans. Slye finished his rookie season with 25 field goals on 32 attempts (78.1%) and made 31 of 35 extra points (88.6%).

==== 2020 season ====
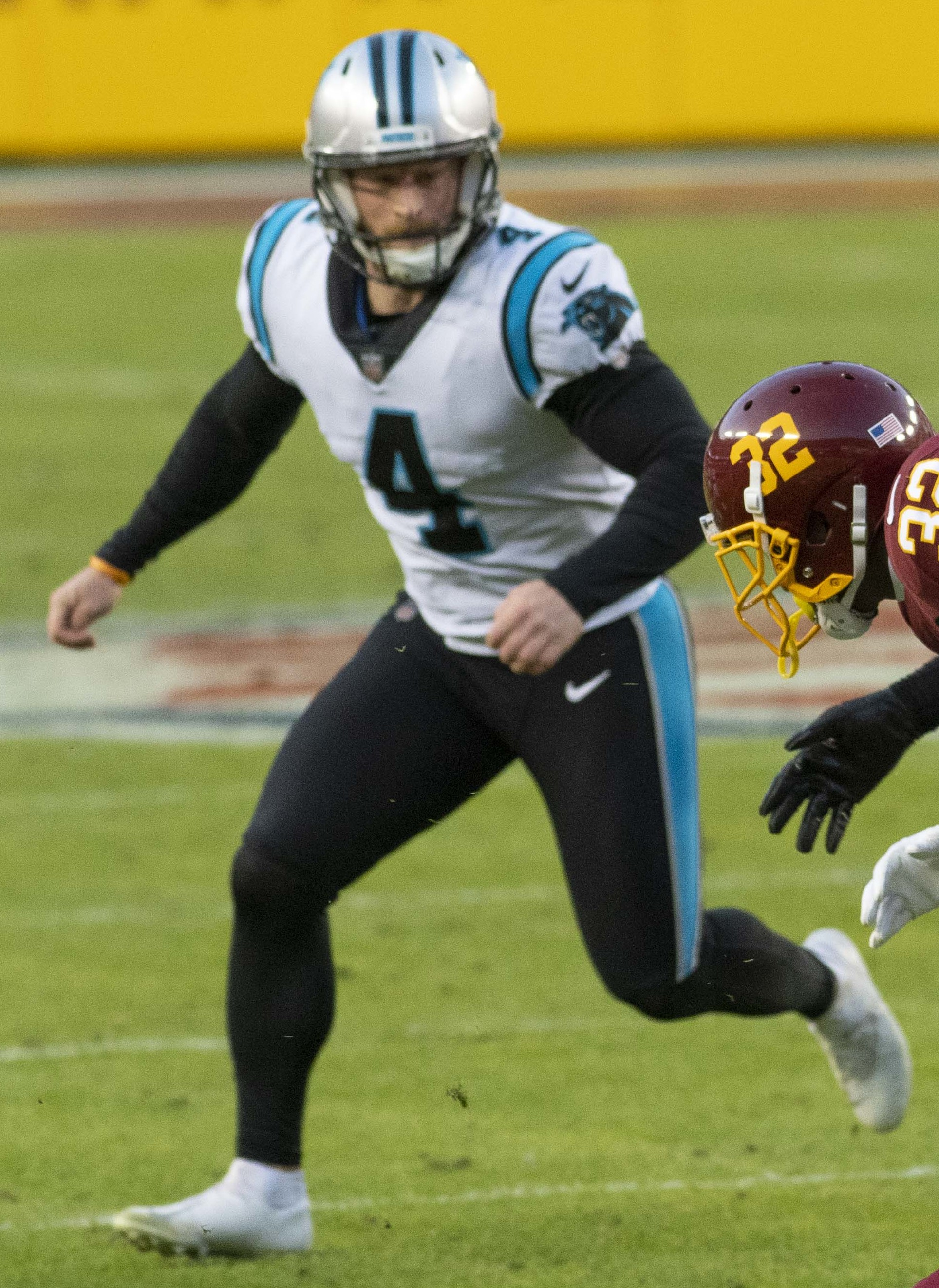
Slye with the Carolina Panthers in 2020

Slye signed a one-year extension with the Panthers on February 6, 2020. He made a career-high five field goals on five attempts in a 21–16 victory over the Los Angeles Chargers on September 28. He was placed on the reserve/COVID-19 list by the Panthers on October 21, and was activated two days later. During Week 7 against the New Orleans Saints, Slye attempted an NFL record 65-yard field goal with 1:55 remaining in the fourth quarter, but was short by a few inches as the Panthers lost 27–24. Two weeks later against the Kansas City Chiefs, he missed another record attempt, this time from 67 yards as time expired. The Panthers lost 33–31. During Week 12 against the Minnesota Vikings, Slye missed another game winning field goal with four seconds remaining from 54 yards as the Panthers lost 28–27. He finished the 2020 season converting 29 of 36 field goal attempts and 33 of 36 extra point attempts.

==== 2021 season ====
Slye signed another one-year contract extension with the Panthers on January 5, 2021. On August 28, he was released after the team traded for Ryan Santoso.

=== Houston Texans ===
On September 7, 2021, Slye was signed to the practice squad of the Houston Texans. Four days later, he was elevated to the active roster following an injury to starting kicker Kaʻimi Fairbairn. In three games, Slye connected on 4 of 5 field goal attempts and 7 of 8 extra point attempts.

Slye was waived on September 30.

=== San Francisco 49ers ===
On October 5, 2021, Slye was signed by the San Francisco 49ers after an injury to Robbie Gould. Slye was waived on November 2, after Gould's return.

=== Washington Football Team / Commanders ===
==== 2021 season ====
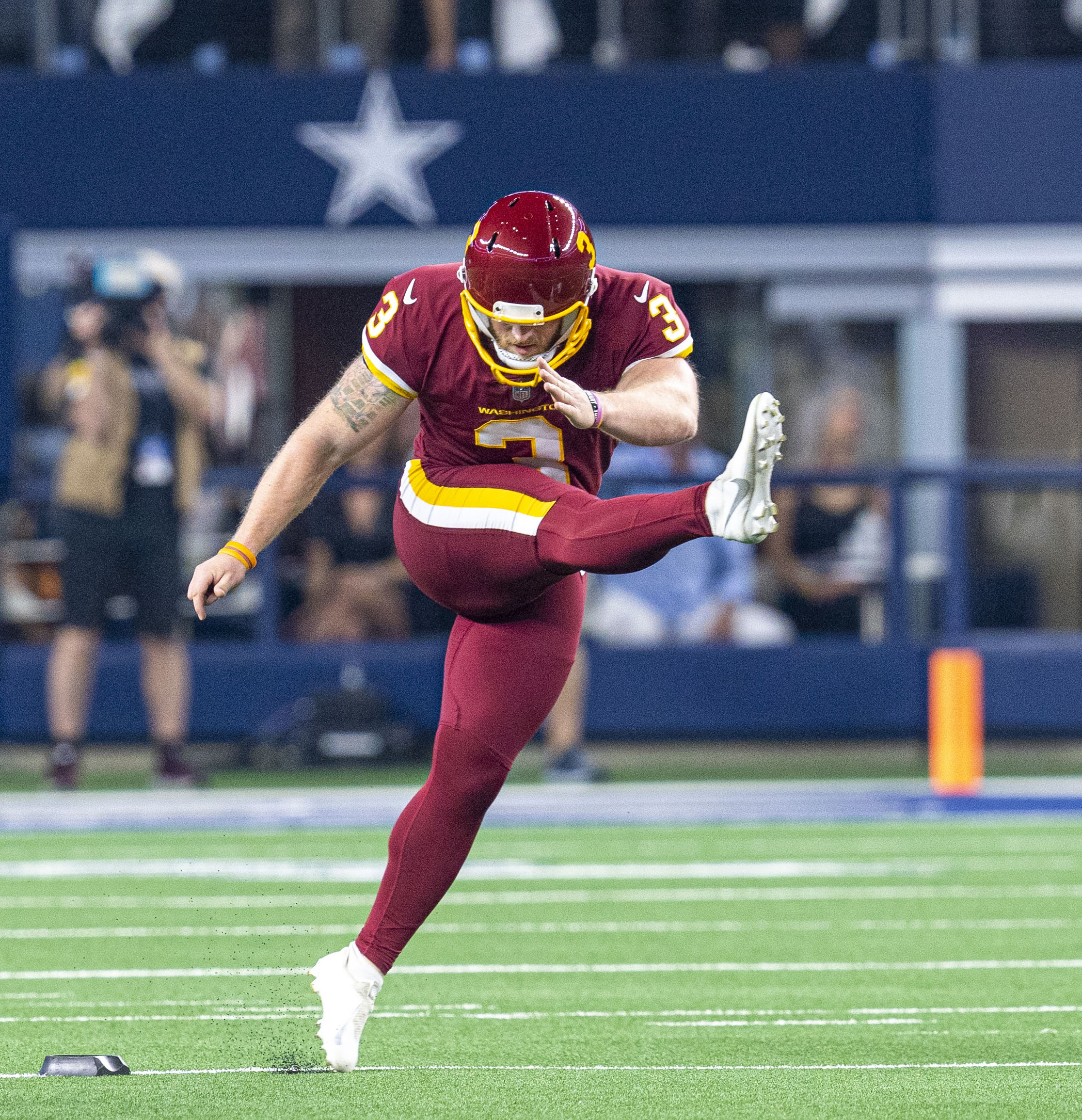
Slye kicking off against the Dallas Cowboys, 2021

Slye signed with the Washington Football Team on November 9, 2021. During Week 12 against the Seattle Seahawks, he suffered a hamstring injury after a blocked extra point attempt and was placed on injured reserve the following day. Slye was activated off injured reserve on December 25. In the 2021 season, he converted 23 of 25 field goal attempts and 18 of 22 extra point attempts in his time with the Texans, 49ers, and the Washington Football Team.

==== 2022 season ====
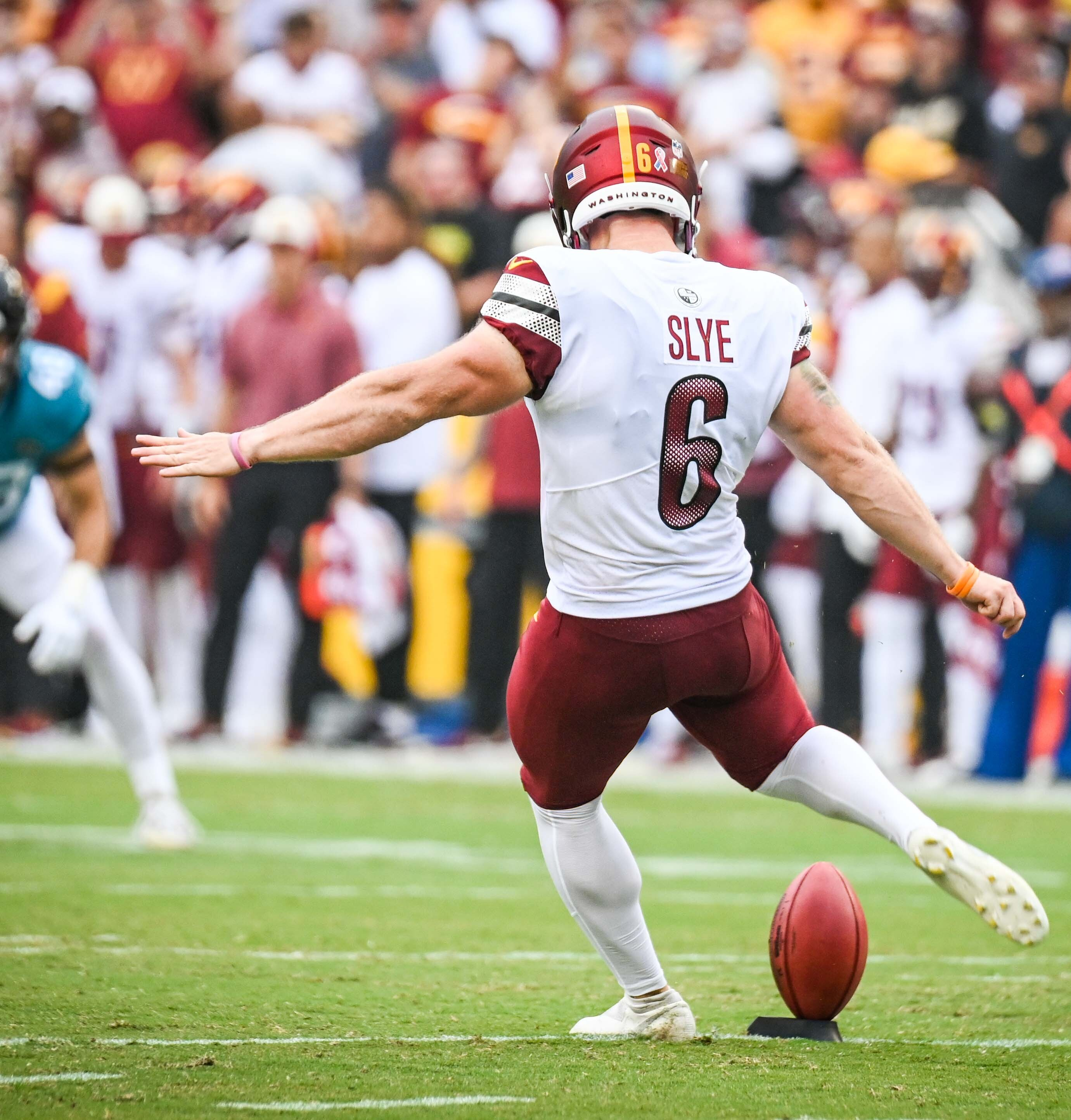
Slye kicking a field goal against the Jacksonville Jaguars, 2022

The team placed a restricted free agent tender on Slye on March 16, 2022, with Slye agreeing to a two-year contract worth around $5 million on April 11.

During Week 10 of the 2022 NFL season against the 8–0 Philadelphia Eagles, Slye played a key part in Washington's 32–21 upset victory. He made all four of his field goals attempts, including a career long 58-yard field goal and another from 55 yards. For this performance, Slye was named NFC Special Teams player of the week. At the end of November 2022, he was named NFC Special Teams Player of the Month for his performance of 37 points, going 7 for 8 on extra points and 10 for 10 on field goals. During Week 13, Slye made two of three field goal attempts, missing a 52-yard attempt in the fourth quarter and with the game resulting in a 20–20 tie against the New York Giants. He finished the 2022 season converting 25 of 30 field goal attempts and 24 of 28 extra point attempts.

==== 2023 season ====
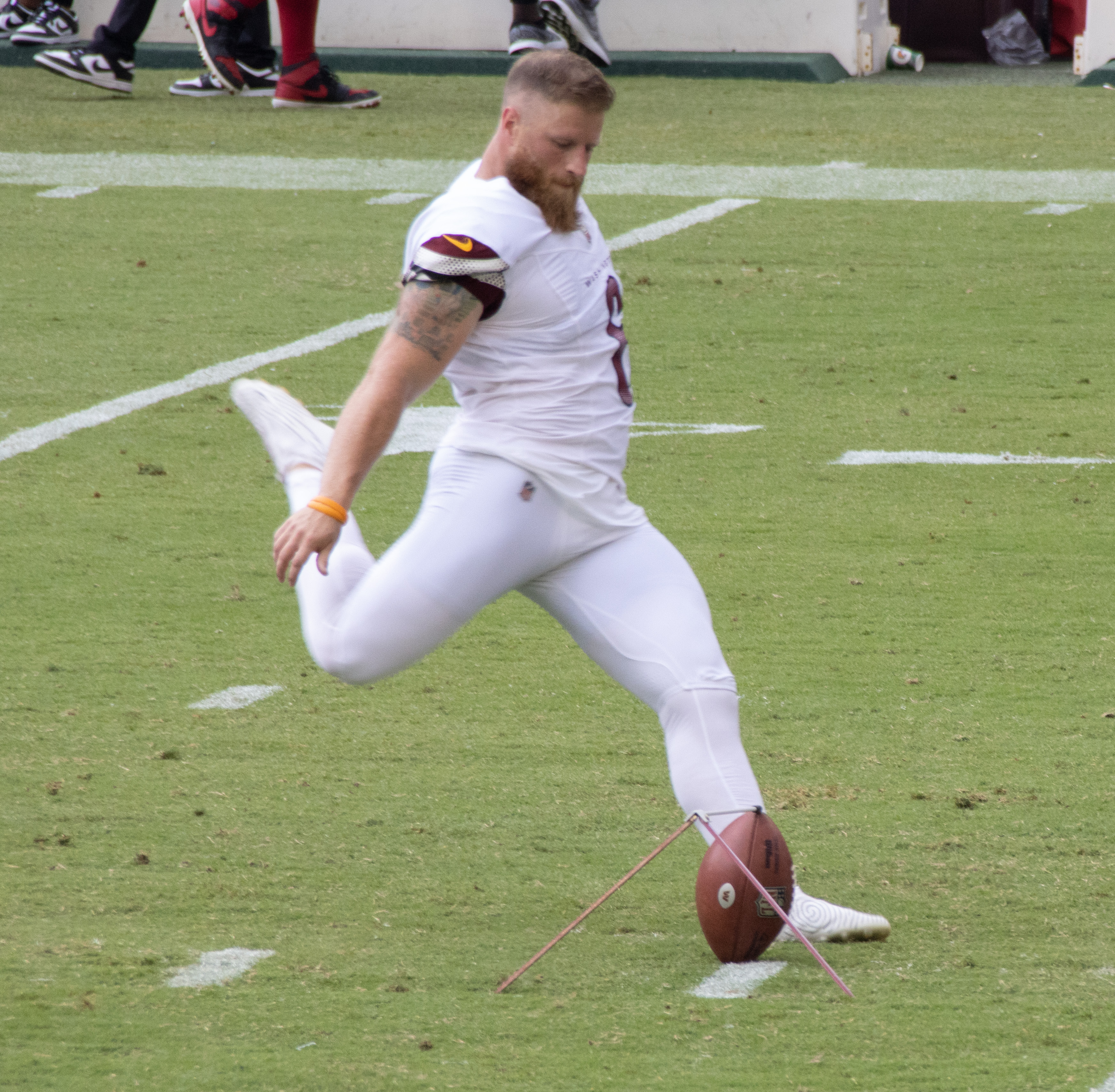
Slye warming up in a game against the Arizona Cardinals, 2023

In Week 8, Slye set a Commanders franchise record for the longest field goal made at 61 yards against the Philadelphia Eagles. He finished the 2023 season converting 19 of 24 field goal attempts and 32 of 35 extra point attempts. The Commanders chose not to re-sign Slye after three seasons. During his tenure with the team, he made 56 of 66 field goals (84.8%), and 65 of 73 extra points (89.0%).

=== Jacksonville Jaguars ===
On March 18, 2024, Slye signed a one-year deal with the Jacksonville Jaguars. On April 30, he was released after they selected Cam Little in the NFL draft.

=== New England Patriots ===
On May 2, 2024, Slye signed a one-year deal with the New England Patriots. During preseason, Slye beat out incumbent kicker Chad Ryland, who was released at the final roster cutdown. During Week 4, Slye set a Patriots franchise record of the longest field goal made at 63 yards also setting a new career high. He finished the 2024 season converting 26 of 33 field goal attempts and 25 of 26 extra point attempts.

=== Tennessee Titans ===
==== 2025 season ====
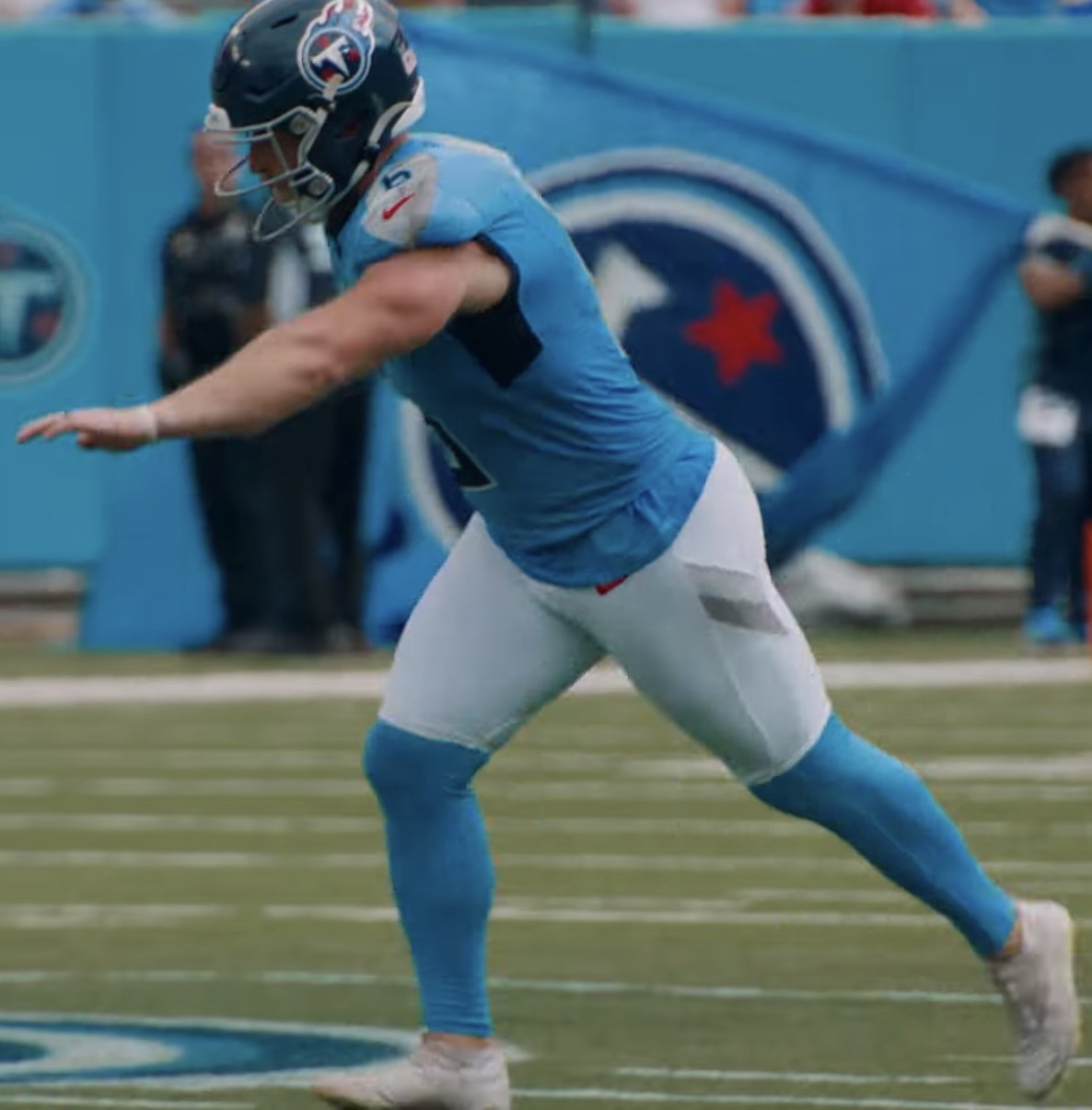
Slye with the Tennessee Titans in 2025

On March 24, 2025, Slye signed with the Tennessee Titans. In Week 5, in a comeback win against the Arizona Cardinals, Slye kicked a game winning 29 yard field goal, as the Titans won 22–21, the first game winning field goal of his career. He finished the 2025 season converting 28 of 35 field goal attempts and 26 of 27 extra point attempts.

==== 2026 season ====
On March 13, 2026, Slye re-signed with the Titans on a one-year, $2 million contract.

After Tommy Townsend suffered an injury in Week 7 against the Cleveland Browns, Slye was tasked with punting duties. He recorded a 42-yard punt on his lone attempt that was downed at the Browns' 18.

== NFL career statistics ==
Legend
**Bold**	Career high

=== Regular season ===
Year	Team	GP	Field goals				Extra points			Points
Year	Team	GP	FGA	FGM	Lng	Pct	XPA	XPM	Pct	Points
2019	CAR	16	32	25	54	78.1	35	31	88.6	106
2020	CAR	16	**36**	**29**	56	80.6	**36**	**33**	91.7	**120**
2021	HOU	3	5	4	53	80.0	8	7	87.5	19
2021	SF	3	8	7	56	87.5	4	2	50.0	23
2021	WAS	6	12	12	55	**100.0**	10	9	90.0	45
2022	WAS	17	30	25	58	83.3	28	24	85.7	99
2023	WAS	17	24	19	61	79.2	35	32	91.4	89
2024	NE	17	33	26	**63**	78.8	26	25	96.2	103
2025	TEN	16	35	28	58	80.0	27	26	96.3	110
2026	TEN	9	15	16	56	93.8	14	14	**100.0**	59
Career		119	231	190	63	82.3	223	203	91.0	773
