= Phil Snow =

American football coach (born 1955)

Personal information
- Born: December 22, 1955 (age 70); Woodland, California

Career information
- College: Cal State Hayward

Career history
- Berkeley HS (1976) Defensive backs coach; Winters HS (1977–1978) Defensive backs coach; Laney (1979) Defensive backs coach; Laney (1980–1981) Defensive coordinator; Boise State (1982) Defensive backs coach; Boise State (1983–1986) Defensive coordinator & safeties coach; California (1987–1991) Defensive backs coach; Arizona State (1992–1994) Defensive backs coach; Arizona State (1995–2000) Defensive coordinator; UCLA (2001–2002) Defensive coordinator & safeties coach; Washington (2003) Co-defensive coordinator & cornerbacks coach; Washington (2004) Defensive coordinator & safeties coach; Detroit Lions (2005) Defensive assistant; Detroit Lions (2006–2008) Linebackers coach; Eastern Michigan (2010–2012) Defensive coordinator & defensive backs coach; Temple (2013–2016) Defensive coordinator & safeties coach; Baylor (2017–2018) Defensive coordinator; Baylor (2019) Defensive coordinator & safeties coach; Carolina Panthers (2020–2022) Defensive coordinator; Chicago Bears (2023) Senior defensive analyst; Nebraska (2025-present) Associate head coach
- Coaching profile at Pro Football Reference

Phillip Snow (born December 22, 1955) is an American football coach who currently serves as the associate head coach at the University of Nebraska–Lincoln. He previously served as the defensive coordinator for the Carolina Panthers of the National Football League (NFL) from 2020 to 2022 and was the senior defensive analyst for the Chicago Bears in 2023.

== Early life ==
Born in Woodland and raised in Winters, both in northern California, Snow attended Sacramento City College (1974–75) and Cal State Hayward (1977–78), where he received a bachelor's degree in physical education.

=== Prep career ===
From an athletic family of three boys and one girl, Snow played several sports at Winters High School, including quarterback and defensive back for the Warriors football team.

== Coaching career ==
=== Early career ===
Snow began his coaching career at the high school level at Berkeley High in 1976 and his alma mater Winters High (1977–78). Snow spent three years at Laney College in Oakland, as the secondary coach (1979), and co-defensive coordinator (1980, 1981).

=== Boise State ===
Starting in 1982, Snow served on the staff at Boise State for five years under head coaches Jim Criner and Lyle Setencich; he was the defensive coordinator for the Broncos in his last four seasons, all under Setencich. His 1986 squad was ranked sixth in the nation (Division I-AA) in total defense, allowing just 269.4 yards per game and recorded two shutouts. It also yielded just 80.3 yards on the ground to rank fourth in the nation in that category. In his final three seasons at Boise State, Snow was assistant head coach in addition to his duties as defensive coordinator.

=== California ===
At California under head coach Bruce Snyder, Snow tutored the secondary for five seasons (1987–1991) in Berkeley, improving the unit each year. His philosophy of man-to-man coverage was a key ingredient in the Golden Bear defensive success. The 1990 and 1991 teams won consecutive bowl games (Copper, Citrus) for the first time in school history. The 1991 team moved up as high as sixth in the national rankings and played in the school's first New Year's Day bowl game in 33 years; they ended at 10–2 and eighth in the nation, and Snyder (and Snow) went to Arizona State in 1992.

=== Arizona State ===
Sun Devil defensive standouts Craig Newsome, Lenny McGill, Kevin Miniefield, and Jason Simmons played under Snow and all went on to the NFL.

The 1996 team went undefeated in the regular season and finished first in the conference in rush defense (98.0), pass defense (104.2), and total defense (306.2). It held Nebraska scoreless and limited the opposition to under 10 points in five games total that season. Led by quarterback Jake Plummer, the Sun Devils narrowly lost the Rose Bowl to Ohio State and finished 11–1, fourth in both polls.

In 1999, Snow's defense finished third in the Pac-10 in scoring defense and featured NFL draft picks Erik Flowers and Junior Ioane on a team which played in the Aloha Bowl. His 1997 group ranked third in the Pac-10, but was first in scoring defense (18.5 ppg). The unit was led by Morris Trophy winner Jeremy Staat and Pac-10 Defensive Player of the Year Pat Tillman. ASU won the Sun Bowl and finished at 14th in both polls.

Snow spent fourteen seasons on Snyder's staff at California and Arizona State. While at ASU, Snow's defenses posted five shutouts and held opponents to 10 points or less in 22 games. His defensive units ranked among the top three in scoring defense in the Pac-10 in three of his last five seasons at ASU. In 2000, the Sun Devils ranked first in the nation in fumbles recovered and third in the country in number of turnovers created. The group was headlined by Pac-10 Defensive Player of the Year Adam Archuleta and Freshman of the Year Terrell Suggs.

=== UCLA ===
Snyder was replaced by Dirk Koetter after the 2000 season, and Snow became the defensive coordinator at UCLA in January 2001 under sixth-year head coach Bob Toledo. The Bruin defense ranked first in the Pac-10 in total defense in 2001, and also finished the season ranked second in the league in rushing defense and scoring defense. Linebacker Robert Thomas, a first round selection by the Rams in the 2002 NFL draft, earned Pac-10 Defensive Player of the Year honors, and Kenyon Coleman was the defensive winner of the Morris Trophy as the Pac-10's best lineman.

=== Washington ===
Snow spent two seasons (2003, 2004) with the University of Washington in Seattle under head coach Keith Gilbertson.

=== Detroit Lions ===
In the National Football League, Snow coached the Detroit Lions' linebacker corps for three seasons (2006–2008), after working as a defensive assistant on the staff in 2005.

=== Eastern Michigan ===
Snow was the defensive coordinator at Eastern Michigan University in Ypsilanti for three seasons under his former University of California player Ron English. (2010–2012).

=== Temple ===
Snow became the defensive coordinator at Temple in 2013 under head coach Matt Rhule, who had served as an assistant underneath Snow at UCLA. The Owls went 2–10 in 2013, their worst performance since going 1–11 in 2006. Under his coaching, linebacker Tyler Matakevich led the AAC in tackles. Matakevich was named 1st-team All-AAC.

==== 2014 ====
In 2014 the Owls improved, going 6-6. After allowing 29.8 points per game in Snow's inaugural season, Temple's defense limited opponents to just 17.5 points per game in 2014, which was the fourth-best mark in Division I. For his efforts, Snow was nominated for the Broyles Award, given annually to the nation's best coordinator. During the regular season, the Owls defeated No. 21 ranked East Carolina 20–10. Under his coaching, linebacker Tyler Matakevich led the AAC in solo tackles, defensive lineman Praise Martin-Oguike ranked 4th in sacks and second in forced fumbles, and defensive back Tavon Young ranked 5th in interceptions, 1st in interception return yards, and 4th in passes defended. Matakevich was named 1st-team All-AAC and Martin-Oguike & Matt Ioannidis were named 2nd-team All-AAC.

==== 2015 ====
In 2015, Snow's defense was once again one of the best in the nation. Temple limited opponents to just 20.1 points per game, the 17th-best mark in Division I, en route to a 10–4 season that saw the Owls defeat Penn State for the first time in 74 years and become nationally ranked for the first time since 1979. The Owls also ranked 20th in Total Defense. They qualified for the 2015 Boca Raton Bowl and lost to Toledo 17–32. Following the regular season, Snow was once again nominated for the Broyles Award. Under his coaching, linebacker Tyler Matakevich ranked 2nd in the AAC in tackles, 3rd in tackles for loss and 2nd in interceptions, defensive lineman Nate Smith ranked 5th in sacks, safety Sean Chandler ranked 5th in interceptions, 3rd in passes defended, and led the AAC in interception return yards & touchdowns, and linebacker Jarred Alwan led the AAC in forced fumbles. Matakevich was named AAC Defensive Player of the Year. Matakevich, Matt Ioannidis, Smith, and Alex Wells were all named 1st-team All-AAC & Chandler was named 2nd-team All-AAC.

==== 2016 ====
In 2016, The Owls went 10-3 and qualified for the 2016 Military Bowl. They would go on to lose to Wake Forest 26–34. During the season, Temple would defeat No. 19 ranked Navy in the AAC championship game. Under his coaching, linebacker Haason Reddick led the AAC in tackles for loss and 2nd in sacks and forced fumbles, defensive lineman Praise Martin-Oguike was 5th in sacks, and defensive back Delvon Randall was 5th in interceptions. Reddick was named 1st-team All-AAC and Martin-Oguike, Sean Chandler & Avery Williams were named 2nd-team All-AAC.

==== Players coached into the NFL ====
- Tyler Matakevich (2013–2015), linebacker for the Pittsburgh Steelers
- Tavon Young (2013–2015), cornerback for the Baltimore Ravens
- Haason Reddick (2013–2016), linebacker for the Carolina Panthers
- Sean Chandler (2015–2016), safety for the New York Giants
- Nate Hairston (2013–2016), cornerback for the New York Jets
- Jullian Taylor (2014–2016), defensive tackle for the San Francisco 49ers
- Matt Ioannidis (2013–2016), defensive tackle for the Washington Redskins

=== Baylor ===
On February 16, 2017, Snow was named defensive coordinator of the Baylor Bears. The Bears ended the season with a record of 1–11. Ira Savage-Lewis ended the season 10th in tackles for loss and 7th in sacks in the Big 12.

In 2018, the Bears went 7-6 and defeated Vanderbilt in the Texas Bowl 45–38. Defensive lineman James Lynch & linebacker Clay Johnston were named All-Big 12. Johnston ranked fifth in total tackles (3rd assisted) in the Big 12.

In 2019, the Bears went 11-3 and lost to both Jalen Hurts' Oklahoma and Jake Fromm's Georgia in the Big 12 Championship and the Sugar Bowl respectively. Snow helped Baylor become the top defense of the Big 12. Defensive lineman James Lynch & Bravvion Roy, linebackers Terrel Bernard & Clay Johnston, and defensive backs Grayland Arnold & Chris Miller were all named to the All-Big 12. James Lynch ranked 7th in the NCAA in tackles for loss and 5th in sacks. Grayland Arnold ranked 5th in interceptions and led the NCAA in interception yards.

==== Players coached into the NFL ====
- Greg Roberts (2017–2018), linebacker for the Green Bay Packers
- Ira Savage-Lewis (2017–2018), defensive end for the Houston Texans

=== Carolina Panthers ===
On January 20, 2020, Snow was hired by the Carolina Panthers as their defensive coordinator, reuniting with head coach Matt Rhule. On October 10, 2022, Snow was let go after the firing of Rhule.

== Personal life ==
Snow is the uncle of 2007 AL Rookie of the Year and 2008 AL MVP, Dustin Pedroia. He has two sons, Philip Snow, a graduate and former member of the University of Nevada-Reno golf team, and Jacob Snow and a grandson born in December 2019.
