= La Serna High School =

Coordinates: 33°57′21″N 117°59′50″W

Location
- 15301 Youngwood Drive; Whittier, California 90605; United States

Information
- Type: Public
- Motto: Vestri Optimus erit
- Established: 1961
- School district: Whittier Union High School District
- Principal: Griselda Castro
- Teaching staff: 89.65 (FTE)
- Grades: 9–12
- Enrollment: 2,385 (2023–2024)
- Student to teacher ratio: 26.60
- Colors: Crimson; Gold; White
- Mascot: Lancer
- Rival: California High School
- Newspaper: The Freelancer
- Yearbook: The Pennon
- Website: http://lshs.wuhsd.org/

La Serna High School (abbreviated LSHS) is a public high school in Whittier, California that was founded in 1961 and is part of the Whittier Union High School District. The school has been honored five times as a California Distinguished School most recently in 2021. The school's colors are crimson, gold, and white.

== History ==
La Serna High School was founded in 1961. It is located on the eastern side of the city of Whittier in a neighborhood named Friendly Hills. The school has been a California Distinguished School five times, in 1990, 1996, 2003, 2009 and 2021.

== Students and student life ==
At La Serna High School, every senior is required to complete the Senior Project in order to graduate high school.

=== Link Crew ===
Link Crew was a system implemented in 2005 that was aimed at helping incoming freshman students acclimate to the high school environment by having junior and senior peer mentors help them through their first year in the Whittier Union High School District.

=== Model United Nations ===
Model United Nations was founded in the 2015–16 school year. The Model United Nations' team attends an annual average of six conferences and one travel conference. In 2016, La Serna's MUN team competed at the UC Berkeley MUN conference.

=== The Freelancer ===
The controversial "Sex Issue"

The Freelancer is the name of La Serna High School's newspaper, which releases one issue each month during the regular school year. The Freelancer is created and written by the students, who also allow feedback mail to which they respond. One teacher oversees the production of each newspaper per year.

In 2006, English teacher Holly Vance was demoted from her position as the adviser of the newspaper's production, due to the controversial penultimate issue on May 10, 2006, entitled "The 'S' Word", which discussed sex amongst teenagers. Also due to this, the final edition of the year, for the month of June, was banned. The student body was unsuccessful in overturning this decision.

The Freelancer was revived during the 2014–15 school year under the supervision of English teacher Gina Alexander.

=== The Pennon ===
La Serna High School's yearbook is called The Pennon, which is created by the Annual Staff (students) and a teacher adviser.

== Athletics ==
La Serna High has a large athletics program. Their sports include football, track and field, cross country, soccer, volleyball, baseball, softball, tennis, wrestling, swimming, basketball and Marching Band. Boys' football, boys' and girls' cross country, boys' and girls' marching band, boys' water polo, and girls' volleyball are held in the autumn; boys' and girls' basketball and soccer are held in the winter; and boys' baseball, tennis, and girls' softball, boys' and girls' swimming, and boys' and girls' track and field are held in the spring every school year.

The 1967 La Serna Lancer Football team were CIF AAA Champions led by Coach Harry Robinson, beating the heavily favored Temple City Rams 33–7 in the CIF Championship game.

The 1990 La Serna Baseball team were the CIF 3A Champions led by Coach Vern Brock, beating Tustin 1–0. Game was played at Anaheim Stadium. Pitcher Willie Adams went on to pitch for the Oakland A's.

The varsity football program were the 2013 CIF Southern Division champions in the southern section, with Frankie Palmer's winning touchdown in a double overtime against Norwalk High School.

The Boys' Water Polo program were CIF Division V Southern Section champions in 2010, Division III champions in 2017, and Division II champions in 2022.

The Girls' Water Polo program were CIF Division IV Southern Section champions in 2014 and 2020, and Division II champions in 2026.

In 2019, the Boys' Cross Country Program reached the CIF State Meet for the first time in school history, finishing 12th overall at the Division I level.

In 2023, the Lancers football team won the CIF Division 2-AA State championship for the first time in school history, defeating Grant Union High School 21–19.

== Notable alumni ==
- Dave Dalby, 1968 – professional football center for the Oakland Raiders from 1972 until 1985
- Bill Bathe – professional baseball player
- Royce "The Voice" Reynolds, 1984 – a member of the doo-wop group The Alley Cats
- Gary Allan Herzberg, 1986 – country music artist
- Jeff Davis, 1991 – actor most notable for his appearances on Whose Line Is It Anyway?
- Matt Gourley, 1991 – comedian known for the Superego podcast and his appearances on Drunk History.
- Morgan Hentzen – swimmer, 2003 Pan American Games champion
- Ara Babajian, 1990 – drummer for the Slackers and the McMartin Choir Boys
- Andrea Barber, 1994 – actress most notable for her role as Kimmy Gibbler on Full House
- Tupe Peko, 1996 – professional football offensive lineman for the Indianapolis Colts from 2002 until 2004
- Adam Snyder, 2000 – professional football offensive guard.
- Andrew Garcia 2010 – 9th place on American Idol Season 10
- Chase De Leo 2013 – professional ice hockey player
- Owen Long, 2024 – college football linebacker
- Vanessa C. Tyson – political scientist
- Aaron Valdes (born 1993) – professional basketball player
