= Tupe Peko =

American football player (born 1978)

No. 56
- Position: Offensive guard

Personal information
- Born: September 19, 1978 (age 48); Whittier, California, U.S.
- Listed height: 6 ft 4 in (1.93 m)
- Listed weight: 305 lb (138 kg)

Career information
- High school: La Serna (Whittier)
- College: Michigan State
- NFL draft: 2001: 7th round, 217th overall pick

Career history
- New York Jets (2001)*; Seattle Seahawks (2001)*; Amsterdam Admirals (2002); Seattle Seahawks (2002)*; Indianapolis Colts (2002–2004); Carolina Panthers (2005)*; Las Vegas Gladiators (2006); Houston Texans (2006)*; Green Bay Packers (2006)*; Las Vegas Gladiators (2007); Utah Blaze (2008)
- * Offseason or practice squad member only

Career NFL statistics
- Games: 27
- Games started: 9
- Stats at Pro Football Reference

Siitupe Marcus "Tupe" Peko, (born September 19, 1978) is an American former professional football player who was an offensive guard in the National Football League (NFL). He played college football for the [Michigan State Spartans.

Peko attended La Serna High School and first played at the collegiate level at Cerritos College before transferring to Michigan State University. He played in the NFL for 4 years, at first primarily as a backup and started in 11 games including playoffs before injuries plagued Peko.

Pre-draft measurables
Height	Weight	Arm length	Hand span	40-yard dash	10-yard split	20-yard split	20-yard shuttle	Three-cone drill	Vertical jump	Broad jump	Bench press
6 ft 3 7/8 in (1.93 m)	300 lb (136 kg)	32 1/2 in (0.83 m)	10 1/4 in (0.26 m)	5.30 s	1.86 s	3.03 s	4.56 s	8.10 s	28.0 in (0.71 m)	7 ft 8 in (2.34 m)	18 reps
All values from NFL Combine

He was selected in the seventh round of the 2001 NFL draft with the 217th overall pick. He has played for the New York Jets, Indianapolis Colts, and Green Bay Packers. Peko is married to Valerie Peko and has 3 sons. Currently Peko works as a police officer with the Indianapolis Metropolitan Police Department.

He is the older brother of Arizona Cardinals defensive tackle Domata Peko. He is also a cousin of football player Fou Fonoti.
