= Adam Snyder =

American football player (born 1982)

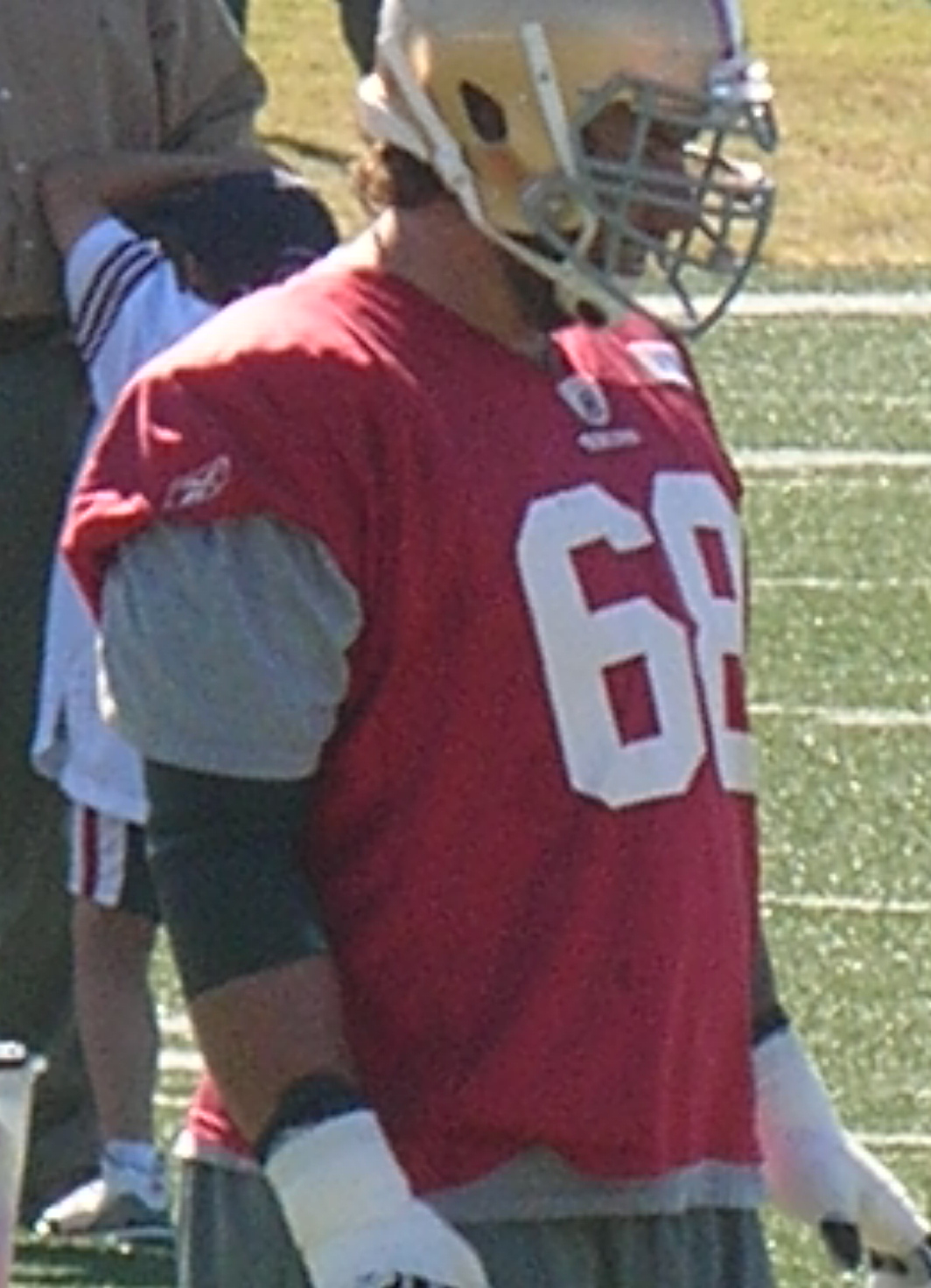
- Snyder with the San Francisco 49ers in 2010

No. 68
- Position: Guard

Personal information
- Born: January 30, 1982 (age 44); Fullerton, California, U.S.
- Listed height: 6 ft 6 in (1.98 m)
- Listed weight: 325 lb (147 kg)

Career information
- High school: La Serna (Whittier, California)
- College: Oregon
- NFL draft: 2005: 3rd round, 94th overall pick

Career history
- San Francisco 49ers (2005–2011); Arizona Cardinals (2012); San Francisco 49ers (2013); New York Giants (2014)

Awards and highlights
- Morris Trophy (2004); First-team All-American (2004); 2× First-team All-Pac-10 (2003, 2004)

Career NFL statistics
- Games played: 141
- Games started: 88
- Stats at Pro Football Reference

Adam Richard Snyder (born January 30, 1982) is an American former professional football player who was an offensive guard in the National Football League (NFL). He was selected in the third round in the 2005 NFL draft by the San Francisco 49ers. He also played for the Arizona Cardinals and the New York Giants.

At the University of Oregon he was the winner of the Morris Trophy, and played every position but center. His junior and senior seasons he was considered one of the premier left offensive tackles in college football.

== Early life ==
Adam Snyder attended La Serna High School in Whittier, California, where he played football. He was coached by Ken LaVigne from 1999 to 2000.

== College career ==
Snyder was redshirted in 2000 at Oregon and saw action in the final 11 games of the 2001 season.

Snyder departed as one of Oregon's most decorated linemen of all time, becoming the Ducks' third Morris Trophy recipient (as the Pac-10 Conference's top lineman) ever. The three-year starter and the school's first two-time first-team all-league offensive line stalwart in four decades extended his string of career starting assignments to 35 at three different positions while playing in 48 of 49 outings.

== Professional career ==
Pre-draft measurables
Height	Weight	Arm length	Hand span	40-yard dash	10-yard split	20-yard split	20-yard shuttle	Three-cone drill	Vertical jump	Broad jump	Bench press
6 ft 5 3/8 in (1.97 m)	316 lb (143 kg)	32 7/8 in (0.84 m)	10 3/8 in (0.26 m)	5.34 s	1.86 s	3.11 s	4.86 s	7.85 s	28.5 in (0.72 m)	7 ft 9 in (2.36 m)	22 reps
All values from NFL Combine/Pro Day

=== San Francisco 49ers (first stint) ===
Snyder played often throughout his first 3 years with the 49ers, playing every position on the offensive line with the exception of center. His versatility and team first mentality earned him a contract extension in 2006 that put him with the 49ers through the 2009 season. He became a full-time starter before the 2009 season. Snyder signed a contract extension in 2009, keeping him with the team through the 2011 season. He has since become the starting right guard.

=== Arizona Cardinals ===
Snyder signed a five-year contract with the Arizona Cardinals on March 14, 2012. He was released by the Cardinals on April 29, 2013.

=== San Francisco 49ers (second stint) ===
Snyder signed a two-year deal with the 49ers on May 6, 2013. He was released by the team on August 30, 2014

=== New York Giants ===
Snyder was signed by the New York Giants on September 3, 2014.

== Personal life ==
Snyder has a journalism and public relations degree. He is the son of Richard and Judi Snyder. He has a sister named Bree. Adam was married in the summer of 2006 to Erika Widmark. He and his wife gave birth to their first child, Kael Richard, in October 2008. They welcomed their second child in September 2010. He was a friend of The Howard Stern Show Wack Pack personality Eric the Actor.

== External ==
- San Francisco 49ers bio
- Media related to Adam Snyder at Wikimedia Commons
