= Elandon Roberts =

American football player (born 1994)

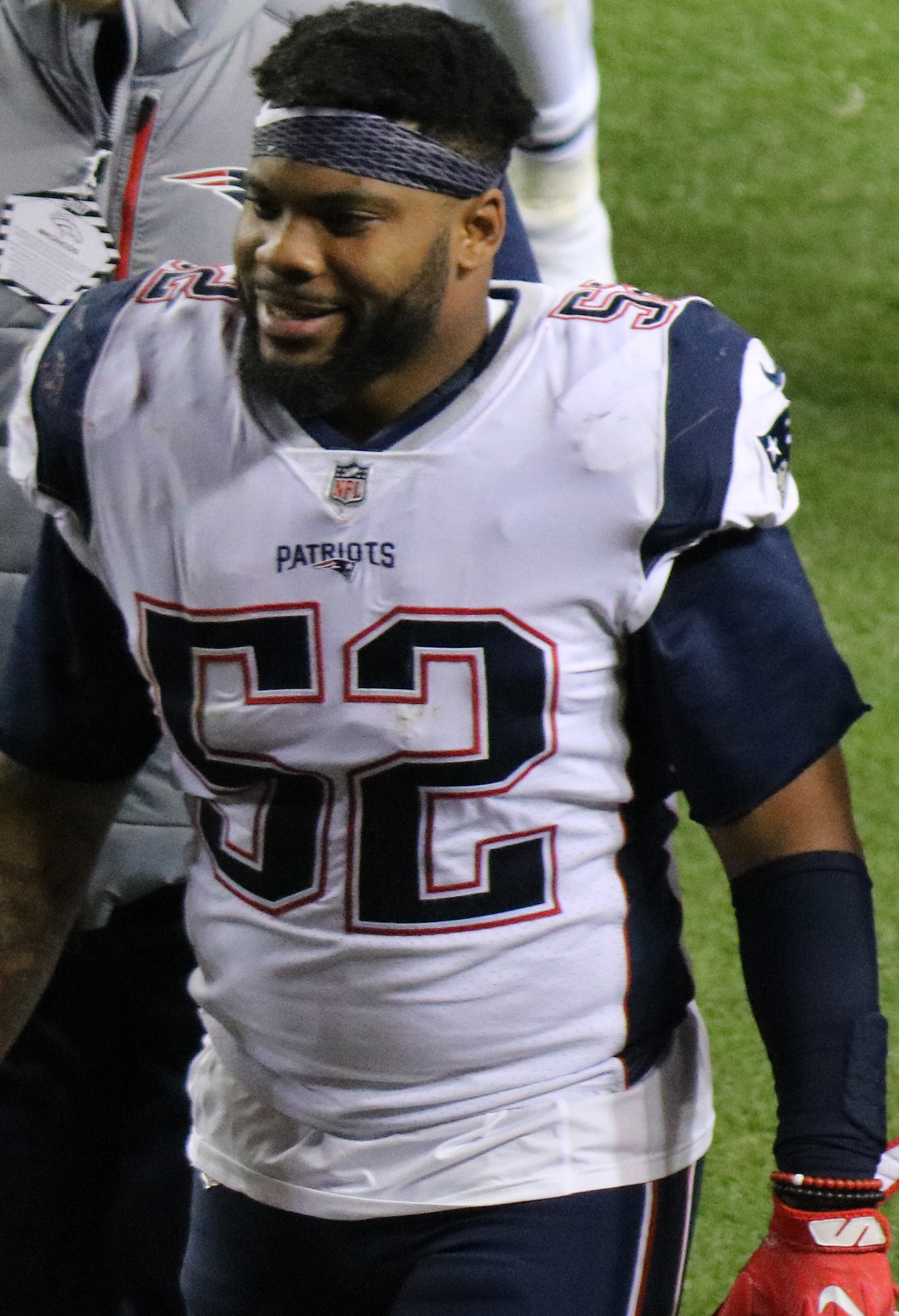
- Roberts with the New England Patriots in 2017

No. 50 – Pittsburgh Steelers
- Position: Linebacker
- Roster status: Practice squad

Personal information
- Born: April 22, 1994 (age 32); Port Arthur, Texas, U.S.
- Listed height: 5 ft 11 in (1.80 m)
- Listed weight: 238 lb (108 kg)

Career information
- High school: Memorial (Port Arthur)
- College: Morgan State (2012); Houston (2013–2015)
- NFL draft: 2016: 6th round, 214th overall pick

Career history
- New England Patriots (2016–2019); Miami Dolphins (2020–2022); Pittsburgh Steelers (2023–2024); Las Vegas Raiders (2025); Pittsburgh Steelers (2026–present)*
- * Offseason or practice squad member only

Awards and highlights
- 2× Super Bowl champion (LI, LIII); First-team All-AAC (2015); Second-team All-MEAC (2012)

Career NFL statistics as of 2025
- Total tackles: 694
- Sacks: 14.5
- Forced fumbles: 5
- Fumble recoveries: 3
- Interceptions: 1
- Pass deflections: 13
- Defensive touchdowns: 1
- Stats at Pro Football Reference

Elandon Roberts (born April 22, 1994) is an American professional football linebacker for the Pittsburgh Steelers of the National Football League (NFL). He played college football for the Houston Cougars. He was selected by the New England Patriots in the sixth round of the 2016 NFL draft.

== Early life ==
Roberts attended Memorial High School in Port Arthur, Texas. He was a member of both the football team and the track & field team.

== College career ==
Roberts played college football for Morgan State as a freshman linebacker in 2012. He finished the season with 107 tackles to lead the team and finish second in the Mid-Eastern Athletic Conference (MEAC) while at Morgan State University, which competes in the NCAA Division I Football Championship Subdivision (FCS). The 107 tackle total marked the second-best single-season effort in program history. He also had nine tackles for a loss, 2.0 sacks, one interception, and two pass breakups. Roberts was named to the All-MEAC second-team in 2012 and finished 11th for the Jerry Rice Award, given to the nation's top freshman on the FCS level. Roberts was also named the MEAC Rookie of the Week three times.

After his freshman season, Roberts transferred to play football at the University of Houston from 2013 to 2015. In his sophomore year, he saw action in eight games as a backup linebacker. As a junior in 2014, Roberts appeared in 12 games as a linebacker and on special teams. As a senior, Roberts was a team captain and made 142 total tackles, which was good enough to lead the American Athletic Conference and place him fourth in the nation. Additionally, his 88 solo tackles led all of the FBS.

== Professional career ==
=== Pre-draft ===
On December 22, 2015, it was announced that Roberts had accepted his invitation to play in the NFLPA Collegiate Bowl. On January 23, 2016, Roberts recorded one tackle for a four-yard loss during the game; he was part of Mike Holmgren's National team that defeated the American team 18–17. On March 24, he participated at Houston's pro day and had an impressive performance. Multiple scouts stated they were impressed with his power, mobility, and his performance in positional drills supervised by Houston Texans defensive coordinator Mike Vrabel. At the conclusion of the pre-draft process, the majority of NFL draft experts and scouts projected Roberts to be a sixth or seventh round pick, with some expecting him to be selected as early as the fourth or fifth round. He was ranked as the tenth best inside linebacker prospect in the draft by DraftScout.com.

Pre-draft measurables
Height	Weight	Arm length	Hand span	Wingspan	40-yard dash	10-yard split	20-yard split	20-yard shuttle	Three-cone drill	Vertical jump	Broad jump	Bench press
5 ft 11 3/8 in (1.81 m)	234 lb (106 kg)	30 5/8 in (0.78 m)	9 3/8 in (0.24 m)	6 ft 0 1/2 in (1.84 m)	4.60 s	1.67 s	2.64 s	4.26 s	7.20 s	36.0 in (0.91 m)	10 ft 0 in (3.05 m)	25 reps
All values from Houston's Pro Day

=== New England Patriots ===
The New England Patriots selected Roberts in the sixth round (214th overall) of the 2016 NFL draft. He was the 27th linebacker selected. On May 7, 2016, the Patriots signed Roberts to a four-year, $2.44 million contract, that includes a signing bonus of $100,356.

External videos
- Patriots draft Elandon Roberts 214th overall

Throughout training camp, Roberts competed against Kamu Grugier-Hill, Rufus Johnson, Kevin Snyder, and C. J. Johnson for a roster spot as a backup linebacker. Head coach Bill Belichick named Roberts the backup middle linebacker to begin the regular season, behind Dont'a Hightower.

He made his first NFL start on October 16 against the Cincinnati Bengals and tied for second-highest tackles on the team with seven in the win. In Week 16 against the New York Jets, Roberts led the team with 11 tackles, including a forced fumble recovered by Malcolm Butler. On February 5, 2017, Roberts was part of the Patriots team that won Super Bowl LI. In the game, he recorded two tackles as the Patriots defeated the Atlanta Falcons by a score of 34–28 in overtime. The Patriots trailed 28–3 in the third quarter, but rallied back to win the game; it featured the first overtime game in Super Bowl history, as well as the largest comeback in Super Bowl history.

Roberts entered the 2017 season as one of the Patriots' starting linebackers. He recorded his first two career sacks in a Week 12 win over the Miami Dolphins. Overall, he recorded 67 total tackles, 2.0 sacks, one pass defended, and one fumble recovery. Roberts helped the Patriots reach Super Bowl LII, but they lost 41–33 to the Philadelphia Eagles; he recorded six tackles in the game.

In 2018, Roberts played in all 16 games while starting in 11. The Patriots finished the season 11–5; Roberts recorded 65 tackles, 1.0 sack, and four passes defended on the season. The Patriots reached Super Bowl LIII after defeating both the Los Angeles Chargers and the Kansas City Chiefs in the playoffs. In the Super Bowl, Roberts recorded one tackle in the team's 13–3 victory against the Los Angeles Rams.

In 2019, Roberts was voted a team defensive captain for the first time, replacing safety Patrick Chung. He was a member of the team's high-performing linebacker corps, and nicknamed "The Boogeymen" by teammate Dont'a Hightower. Starting in Week 7, he began to play on offense as well as defense, where he was primarily used as a fullback after injuries to teammates James Develin and Jakob Johnson. Roberts finished the season with 29 tackles, 1.0 sack, a pass defense, and a tackle for loss.

On December 29, 2019, Roberts scored his first career touchdown against the Miami Dolphins; he caught a 38-yard touchdown pass from Tom Brady during the 27–24 loss.

=== Miami Dolphins ===
On March 24, 2020, the Miami Dolphins signed Roberts to a one-year, $2 million contract that includes a $1 million signing bonus. The signing reunited Roberts with Dolphins' head coach Brian Flores, who had previously been the linebackers coach for the New England Patriots. Roberts was also reunited with former Patriots' linebackers Kyle Van Noy and Kamu Grugier-Hill. He was named a starting inside linebacker alongside Jerome Baker. On December 31, Roberts was placed on injured reserve. He played in 13 games with 11 starts, recording 61 tackles, 1.5 sacks, one forced fumble and a fumble recovery.

Roberts re-signed with the Dolphins on March 24, 2021. He was named a starting linebacker that season, playing in all 17 games with 15 starts, recording a career-high 83 tackles, 1.0 sack, four passes defensed, two forced fumbles and an interception.

On March 18, 2022, Roberts re-signed for a third season with the Dolphins. He finished the season with 4.5 sacks and 107 total tackles. He started in all 17 games.

=== Pittsburgh Steelers (first stint) ===
On March 16, 2023, Roberts signed a two-year contract with the Pittsburgh Steelers. In the 2023 season, he had 2.5 sacks, 101 tackles, and two passes defended. In the 2024 season, he had one sack and 46 total tackles. In the Wild Card Round, he had 14 total tackles in a 28–14 loss to the Baltimore Ravens.

=== Las Vegas Raiders ===
On March 13, 2025, Roberts signed with the Las Vegas Raiders on a one-year, $3 million contract. In the 2025 season, he had 90 tackles, one pass defended, and one fumble recovery in 17 games.

=== Pittsburgh Steelers (second stint) ===
On August 13, 2026, Roberts signed a one-year contract with the Pittsburgh Steelers. He was released by Pittsburgh as a part of final roster cuts on August 30. Roberts was re-signed to the practice squad on October 13.

== NFL career statistics ==
Legend
	Won the Super Bowl
**Bold**	Career high

=== Regular season ===
Year	Team	Games		Tackles					Interceptions						Fumbles				
Year	Team	GP	GS	Cmb	Solo	Ast	Sck	TFL	Int	Yds	Avg	Lng	TD	PD	FF	Fum	FR	Yds	TD
2016	NE	13	5	45	25	20	0.0	2	0	0	0.0	0	0	0	1	0	0	0	0
2017	NE	15	14	67	45	22	2.0	6	0	0	0.0	0	0	1	0	0	**1**	0	0
2018	NE	16	11	65	31	34	1.0	6	0	0	0.0	0	0	**4**	0	0	0	0	0
2019	NE	16	3	29	18	11	1.0	1	0	0	0.0	0	0	1	1	0	0	0	0
2020	MIA	13	11	61	33	28	1.5	8	0	0	0.0	0	0	0	**2**	0	**1**	0	0
2021	MIA	**17**	15	83	42	41	1.0	6	**1**	**85**	**85.0**	**85**	**1**	**4**	0	0	0	0	0
2022	MIA	**17**	**17**	**107**	**68**	39	**4.5**	**10**	0	0	0.0	0	0	0	0	0	0	0	0
2023	PIT	16	15	101	**68**	33	2.5	**10**	0	0	0.0	0	0	2	0	0	0	0	0
2024	PIT	**17**	14	46	24	22	1.0	5	0	0	0.0	0	0	0	1	0	**1**	0	0
2025	LV	**17**	16	90	42	**48**	0.0	6	0	0	0.0	0	0	1	0	0	0	0	0
Career		157	121	694	396	298	14.5	60	1	85	85.0	85	1	13	5	0	3	0	0

=== Postseason ===
Year	Team	Games		Tackles					Interceptions						Fumbles				
Year	Team	GP	GS	Cmb	Solo	Ast	Sck	TFL	Int	Yds	Avg	Lng	TD	PD	FF	Fum	FR	Yds	TD
2016	NE	**3**	2	7	5	2	0.0	0	0	0	0.0	0	0	0	0	0	0	0	0
2017	NE	**3**	**3**	**15**	**7**	**8**	0.0	0	0	0	0.0	0	0	0	0	0	0	0	0
2018	NE	**3**	1	7	6	1	0.0	**1**	0	0	0.0	0	0	0	0	0	0	0	0
2019	NE	1	1	2	1	1	0.0	0	0	0	0.0	0	0	0	0	0	0	0	0
2022	MIA	1	1	3	2	1	0.0	0	0	0	0.0	0	0	0	0	0	0	0	0
2023	PIT	1	1	5	3	2	0.0	0	0	0	0.0	0	0	**1**	0	0	0	0	0
2024	PIT	1	1	14	**7**	7	0.0	0	0	0	0.0	0	0	0	0	0	0	0	0
Career		13	10	53	31	22	0.0	1	0	0	0.0	0	0	1	0	0	0	0	0

== Personal life ==
Roberts has three siblings. His cousin Jermire played football at Iowa and his cousin Calvin played football at Oklahoma State.

== See also ==
- List of NCAA major college football yearly tackles leaders
