= List of NCAA major college football yearly tackles leaders =

List of yearly NCAA sack leaders

The list of NCAA major college football yearly tackles leaders identifies the NCAA major college tackles leaders. The list is limited to players for major college programs, which includes the NCAA Division I Football Bowl Subdivision (2006–present), NCAA Division I-A (1978–2005), and NCAA University Division (1956–1977).

== Leaders ==
=== Solo tackles ===
Key
Bold † = Figure established an NCAA major college record

Year	Name	Team	Solo tackles
2005	Abdul Hodge	Iowa	96
2006	Alvin Bowen	Iowa State	95
2007	Jordon Dizon	Colorado	114 †
2008	Quan Sturdivant	North Carolina	87
2009	Travis Bradshaw	Rice	90
2010	Luke Kuechly	Boston College	110
2011	Luke Kuechly	Boston College	102
2012	Eric Kendricks	UCLA	92
2013	Tyler Matakevich	Temple	106
2014	Eric Kendricks	UCLA	101
2015	Elandon Roberts	Houston	88
2016	Tegray Scales	Indiana	93
2017	Frank Ginda	San Jose State	94
2018	Joe Dineen	Kansas	108
2019	Evan Weaver	California	103
2020	Darius Muasau	Hawaii	68
2021	Chad Muma	Wyoming	85
2022	Shaun Dolac	Buffalo	97
2023	Trevor Williams	Sam Houston State	85
2024	Carson Schwesinger	UCLA	90
2025	Quinton Urwiler	Northern Illinois	71

=== Combined tackles ===
Key
Bold † = Figure established an NCAA major college record

Year	Name	Team	Combined tackles
2005	Jim Cottrell	New Mexico State	179
2006	Matt Castelo	San Jose State	165
2007	Chris Chamberlain	Tulsa	165
2008	Sean Weatherspoon	Missouri Tigers	155
2009	Carmen Messina	New Mexico	162
2010	Luke Kuechly	Boston College	183
2011	Luke Kuechly	Boston College	191 †
2012	Dan Molls	Toledo	166
2013	Keith Smith	San Jose State	159
2014	Scooby Wright	Arizona	163
2015	Kentrell Brothers	Missouri	152
2016	Rodney Butler	New Mexico State	165
2017	Frank Ginda	San Jose State	173
2018	Ben Burr-Kirven	Washington	176
2019	Evan Weaver	California	182
2020	Carlton Martial, Zakoby McClain	Troy, Auburn	113
2021	Jack Campbell	Iowa	143
2022	Jason Henderson	Old Dominion	186
2023	Jay Higgins	Iowa	171
2024	Shaun Dolac	Buffalo	168
2025	Owen Long	Colorado State	151
