= 2015 American Athletic Conference football season =

- League: NCAA Division I FBS (Football Bowl Subdivision)
- Sport: Football
- Duration: September 3, 2015 through January 2016
- Teams: 12
- TV partner(s): ABC, ESPN, ESPN2, ESPNU, and CBS Sports Network

2016 NFL Draft
- Top draft pick: William Jackson III (Houston)
- Picked by: Cincinnati Bengals, 24th overall

Regular season
- East champions: Temple Owls
- East runners-up: South Florida Bulls
- West champions: Houston Cougars
- West runners-up: Navy Midshipmen

The American Championship
- Champions: Houston Cougars
- Runners-up: Temple Owls

Football seasons
- 2014 2016

2015 American Athletic Conference football standings
	Conf.			Overall
Team	W		L	W		L
East Division
Temple x	7	–	1	10	–	4
South Florida	6	–	2	8	–	5
Cincinnati	4	–	4	7	–	6
UConn	4	–	4	6	–	7
East Carolina	3	–	5	5	–	7
UCF	0	–	8	0	–	12
West Division
No. 8 Houston xy$	7	–	1	13	–	1
No. 18 Navy x	7	–	1	11	–	2
Memphis	5	–	3	9	–	4
Tulsa	3	–	5	6	–	7
Tulane	1	–	7	3	–	9
SMU	1	–	7	2	–	10
Championship: Houston 24, Temple 13
$ – Conference champion; x – Division champion/co-champions; y – Championship game participant; As of December 31, 2015; Rankings from AP Poll

The 2015 American Athletic Conference football season was the 25th NCAA Division I FBS football season of the American Athletic Conference (The American). The season was the third since the breakup of the former Big East Conference, and was the second season with the new College Football Playoff in place. Under the playoff system, The American was no longer an Automatic Qualifying conference (AQ), and is considered a member of the "Group of Five" (G5) with Conference USA, the Mid-American Conference, Mountain West Conference, and the Sun Belt Conference. Whereas under the previous system the champion of the conference was guaranteed an automatic berth to a BCS bowl game, now the highest-ranked member of the G5 receives a bid to one of the six major bowls.

The American consisted of 12 members: Cincinnati, East Carolina, Houston, Memphis, SMU, South Florida, Temple, Tulane, Tulsa, UCF, UConn, and new football-only member Navy. In June 2015, the Collegiate Commissioner's Association announced that it will postpone final rankings until after the annual Army–Navy Game if Navy or Army are in contention for a spot in the semifinals or a New Years Six bowl. If Navy is the highest-ranked Group of 5 champion and loses to Army, it would be replaced by next highest-ranked Group of 5 champion in the New Years Six Bowl. This ultimately did not happen, as a late-season loss to Houston left them out of title contention.

== Previous season ==
Memphis, Cincinnati, and UCF were declared co-champions for the 2014 season, with each team having a conference record of 7–1. Memphis finished the season ranked 25th after defeating BYU 55–48 in 2OT in the Miami Beach Bowl. UCF was defeated by NC State in the St. Petersburg Bowl, and Virginia Tech defeated Cincinnati in the Military Bowl. With less than 11 minutes left on the game clock in the Armed Forces Bowl, Houston trailed Pittsburgh by 25 points, but the Cougars went on to win by a score of 35–34. It was the biggest fourth quarter comeback in bowl history. Florida defeated East Carolina 28–20 in the Birmingham Bowl.

=== American Athletic Conference Media Day ===
The 2015 American Athletic Conference Media Day was held at the Hyatt Regency Newport in Newport, Rhode Island on August 3, 2015.

=== Preseason poll ===
==== East Division ====
1. Cincinnati (29) 179
2. UCF (1) 135
3. Temple 116
4. East Carolina 105
5. South Florida 53
6. Connecticut 42

==== West Division ====
1. Memphis (13) 153
2. Houston (10) 149
3. Navy (7) 148
4. Tulane 74
5. SMU 59
6. Tulsa 47
- (First-Place Votes) Points

=== Predicted American Championship Game Winner ===
1. Cincinnati 22
2. Memphis 5
3. Houston 2
4. UCF 1
- Points

== Head coaches ==
East Division

- Tommy Tuberville, Cincinnati – 3rd year
- Bob Diaco, Connecticut – 2nd year
- Ruffin McNeill, East Carolina – 5th year
- Willie Taggart, South Florida – 3rd year
- Matt Rhule, Temple – 3rd year
- George O'Leary (resigned after 8 games) / Danny Barrett (interim)*, UCF

West Division

- Tom Herman, Houston – 1st year
- Justin Fuente, Memphis – 4th year
- Ken Niumatalolo, Navy – 13th year
- Chad Morris, SMU – 1st year
- Curtis Johnson, Tulane – 4th year
- Philip Montgomery, Tulsa – 1st year

=== Coaching changes ===
==== Changes after 2014 season ====
* On December 1, 2014, Chad Morris (formerly Offensive Coordinator at Clemson) was hired by SMU as its new head football coach, replacing June Jones, who resigned on September 8, 2014, citing "personal issues".

* On December 11, 2014, Philip Montgomery (previously Offensive Coordinator at Baylor) was hired by Tulsa as its new head football coach, replacing Bill Blankenship, who was fired December 2, 2014.

* On December 15, 2014, Tom Herman (formerly Offensive Coordinator at Ohio State) was hired by Houston as its new head football coach, to replace Tony Levine, who was fired after three seasons on December 8, 2014.

==== Changes during 2015 season ====
* George O'Leary resigned as UCF's head football coach after twelve seasons. Quarterbacks coach Danny Barrett was named interim head coach for the remainder of the season.

== Rankings ==
Legend
	Improvement in ranking
	Drop in ranking
	Not ranked previous week
	No change in ranking from previous week
RV	Received votes but were not ranked in Top 25 of poll

		Pre	Wk 2	Wk 3	Wk 4	Wk 5	Wk 6	Wk 7	Wk 8	Wk 9	Wk 10	Wk 11	Wk 12	Wk 13	Wk 14	Wk 15	Final
Cincinnati	AP	RV	RV														
Cincinnati	C	RV															
Cincinnati	CFP	Not released															
Connecticut	AP																
Connecticut	C																
Connecticut	CFP	Not released															
East Carolina	AP																
East Carolina	C																
East Carolina	CFP	Not released															
Houston	AP			RV	RV	RV	RV	24	21	18	18	16	13	21	17	14	8
Houston	C			RV	RV	RV	RV	RV	22	19	18	16	14	21	18	16	8
Houston	CFP	Not released									25	24	19		19	18	
Memphis	AP				RV	RV	RV	RV	18	16	15	25	RV		RV	RV	
Memphis	C		RV	RV	RV	RV	25	22	17	16	16	25	RV		RV	RV	RV
Memphis	CFP	Not released									13	21	21				
Navy	AP					RV	RV	RV			RV	22	19	16	22	21	18
Navy	C					RV	RV	RV	RV	RV	RV	23	19	15	22	22	18
Navy	CFP	Not released										20	16	15	23	21	
SMU	AP																
SMU	C																
SMU	CFP	Not released															
South Florida	AP													RV	RV	RV	
South Florida	C																
South Florida	CFP	Not released															
Temple	AP		RV	RV	RV	RV	RV	RV	22	21	23	21	RV	25	20	24	RV
Temple	C		RV	RV	RV	RV	RV	RV	24	22	23	21	RV	24	21	24	RV
Temple	CFP	Not released									22	22		25	22	24	
Tulane	AP																
Tulane	C																
Tulane	CFP	Not released															
Tulsa	AP																
Tulsa	C																
Tulsa	CFP	Not released															
UCF	AP	RV															
UCF	C	RV															
UCF	CFP	Not released															

== Schedule ==
Index to colors and formatting
The American member won
The American member lost
The American teams in **bold**

=== Week 1 ===
Date	Time	Visiting team	Home team	Site	TV	Result	Attendance	Ref.
September 3	6:00 p.m.	FIU	UCF	Bright House Networks Stadium • Orlando, FL	CBSSN	**L** 14–15	39,184	
September 3	7:30 p.m.	Villanova	Connecticut	Pratt & Whitney Stadium at Rentschler Field • East Hartford, CT	SNY	**W** 20–15	26,113	
September 3	9:30 p.m.	Duke	Tulane	Yulman Stadium • New Orleans, LA	CBSSN	**L** 7–37	25,470	
September 4	7:00 p.m.	No. 4 Baylor	SMU	Gerald J. Ford Stadium • Dallas, TX	ESPN	**L** 21–56	32,047	
September 5	12:00 p.m.	Colgate	Navy	Navy–Marine Corps Memorial Stadium • Annapolis, MD	CBSSN	**W** 48–10	28,015	
September 5	3:30 p.m.	Penn State	Temple	Lincoln Financial Field • Philadelphia, PA	ESPN	**W** 27–10	69,176	
September 5	3:30 p.m.	Florida Atlantic	Tulsa	Skelly Field at H. A. Chapman Stadium • Tulsa, OK	CBSSN	**W** 47–44 ^{OT}	24,001	
September 5	6:00 p.m.	Towson	East Carolina	Dowdy–Ficklen Stadium • Greenville, NC	ESPN3	**W** 28–20	40,712	
September 5	7:00 p.m.	Alabama A&M	Cincinnati	Nippert Stadium • Cincinnati, OH	ESPN3	**W** 52–10	39,095	
September 5	7:00 p.m.	Missouri State	Memphis	Liberty Bowl Memorial Stadium • Memphis, TN	ESPN3	**W** 63–7	41,730	
September 5	7:00 p.m.	Florida A&M	South Florida	Raymond James Stadium • Tampa, FL	ESPN3	**W** 51–3	30,434	
September 5	8:00 p.m.	Tennessee Tech	Houston	TDECU Stadium • Houston, TX	ESPN3	**W** 52–24	30,479	
^{#}Rankings from AP Poll released prior to game. All times are in Eastern Time.

=== Week 2 ===
Date	Time	Visiting team	Home team	Site	TV	Result	Attendance	Ref.
September 12	11:30 a.m.	**South Florida**	Florida State	Doak Campbell Stadium • Tallahassee, FL	ESPN	**L** 14–34	72,811	
September 12	12:00 p.m.	Army	**Connecticut**	Pratt & Whitney Stadium at Rentschler Field • East Hartford, CT	CBSSN	**W** 22–17	28,260	
September 12	3:30 p.m.	**Houston**	Louisville	Papa John's Cardinal Stadium • Louisville, KY	RSN	**W** 34–31	50,019	
September 12	3:30 p.m.	**Tulane**	No. 15 Georgia Tech	Bobby Dodd Stadium • Atlanta, GA	RSN	**L** 10–65	50,435	
September 12	7:00 p.m.	**East Carolina**	Florida	Ben Hill Griffin Stadium • Gainesville, FL	ESPN2	**L** 24–31	88,034	
September 12	7:00 p.m.	**Memphis**	Kansas	Memorial Stadium • Lawrence, KS		**W** 55–23	37,798	
September 12	7:00 p.m.	North Texas	**SMU**	Gerald J. Ford Stadium • Dallas, TX (Safeway Bowl)	ESPN3	**W** 31–13	25,401	
September 12	8:00 p.m.	**Temple**	**Cincinnati**	Nippert Stadium • Cincinnati, OH	ESPNews	**TEMP 34–26**	38,112	
September 12	8:00 p.m.	**Tulsa**	New Mexico	University Stadium • Albuquerque, NM	ESPN3	**W** 40–21	24,167	
September 12	10:30 p.m.	**UCF**	Stanford	Stanford Stadium • Stanford, CA	FS1	**L** 7–31	50,420	
^{#}Rankings from AP Poll released prior to game. All times are in Eastern Time.

Date	Bye Week
September 12	Navy

=== Week 3 ===
Date	Time	Visiting team	Home team	Site	TV	Result	Attendance	Ref.
September 19	12:00 p.m.	**Connecticut**	No. 20 Missouri	Faurot Field • Columbia, MO	ESPNU	**L** 6–9	70,079	
September 19	12:00 p.m.	**South Florida**	Maryland	Byrd Stadium • College Park, MD	ESPNews	**L** 17–35	36,827	
September 19	12:00 p.m.	**Temple**	Massachusetts	Gillette Stadium • Foxborough, MA	ESPN3	**W** 25–23	10,141	
September 19	12:00 p.m.	**Tulsa**	No. 16 Oklahoma	Gaylord Family Oklahoma Memorial Stadium • Norman, OK	FS1	**L** 38–52	85,657	
September 19	3:00 p.m.	**Memphis**	Bowling Green	Doyt Perry Stadium • Bowling Green, OH	ASN	**W** 44–41	21,178	
September 19	3:30 p.m.	**East Carolina**	**Navy**	Navy–Marine Corps Memorial Stadium • Annapolis, MD	CBSSN	**NAVY** 45–21	34,717	
September 19	3:30 p.m.	**Cincinnati**	Miami (OH)	Yager Stadium • Oxford, OH (120th Battle for the Victory Bell)	ESPN3	**W** 37–33	18,484	
September 19	6:00 p.m.	Furman	**UCF**	Bright House Networks Stadium • Orlando, FL	ESPN3	**L** 15–16	36,484	
September 19	8:00 p.m.	**SMU**	No. 3 TCU	Amon G. Carter Stadium • Fort Worth, TX (Battle for the Iron Skillet)	FSN	**L** 37–56	48,127	
September 19	8:00 p.m.	Maine	**Tulane**	Yulman Stadium • New Orleans, LA	ESPN3	**W** 38–7	21,114	
^{#}Rankings from AP Poll released prior to game. All times are in Eastern Time.

Date	Bye Week
September 19	Houston

=== Week 4 ===
Date	Time	Visiting team	Home team	Site	TV	Result	Attendance	Ref.
September 24	7:30 p.m.	**Cincinnati**	**Memphis**	Liberty Bowl Memorial Stadium • Memphis, TN	ESPN	**MEM** 53–46	45,172	
September 26	12:00 p.m.	**Navy**	**Connecticut**	Pratt & Whitney Stadium at Rentschler Field • East Hartford, CT	CBSSN	**NAVY** 28–18	33,204	
September 26	12:00 p.m.	**UCF**	South Carolina	Williams-Brice Stadium • Columbia, SC	ESPNU	**L** 14–31	78,411	
September 26	3:30 p.m.	Virginia Tech	**East Carolina**	Dowdy–Ficklen Stadium • Greenville, NC	ABC/ESPN2	**W** 35–28	50,514	
September 26	7:00 p.m.	James Madison	**SMU**	Gerald J. Ford Stadium • Dallas, TX	ESPN3	**L** 45–48	22,314	
September 26	8:00 p.m.	Texas State	**Houston**	TDECU Stadium • Houston, TX	ESPN3	**W** 59–14	35,257	
^{#}Rankings from AP Poll released prior to game. All times are in Eastern Time.

Date	Bye Week			
September 26	South Florida	Temple	Tulane	Tulsa

=== Week 5 ===
Date	Time	Visiting team	Home team	Site	TV	Result	Attendance	Ref.
October 1	7:30 p.m.	Miami (FL)	**Cincinnati**	Nippert Stadium • Cincinnati, OH	ESPN	**W** 34–23	40,101	
October 2	7:00 p.m.	**Memphis**	**South Florida**	Raymond James Stadium • Tampa, FL	ESPN2	**MEM** 24–17	22,546	
October 2	7:00 p.m.	**Temple**	Charlotte	Jerry Richardson Stadium • Charlotte, NC	CBSSN	**W** 37–3	13,105	
October 2	10:15 p.m.	**Connecticut**	BYU	LaVell Edwards Stadium • Provo, UT	ESPN2	**L** 13–30	56,393	
October 3	12:00 p.m.	**UCF**	**Tulane**	Yulman Stadium • New Orleans, LA	ESPNews	**TULN** 45–31	20,024	
October 3	12:00 p.m.	**Houston**	**Tulsa**	Skelly Field at H. A. Chapman Stadium • Tulsa, OK	CBSSN	**HOU** 38–24	17,146	
October 3	3:30 p.m.	Air Force	**Navy**	Navy–Marine Corps Memorial Stadium • Annapolis, MD (Commander-in-Chief's Trophy)	CBSSN	**W** 33–11	32,705	
October 3	4:00 p.m.	**East Carolina**	**SMU**	Gerald J. Ford Stadium • Dallas, TX	ESPNews	**ECU** 49–23	17,136	
^{#}Rankings from AP Poll released prior to game. All times are in Eastern Time.

=== Week 6 ===
Date	Time	Visiting team	Home team	Site	TV	Result	Attendance	Ref.
October 8	8:00 p.m.	**SMU**	**Houston**	TDECU Stadium • Houston, TX (rivalry)	ESPN2	**HOU** 49–28	25,204	
October 10	12:00 p.m.	**Tulane**	**Temple**	Lincoln Financial Field • Philadelphia, PA	ESPNU	**TEMP** 49–10	35,179	
October 10	3:30 p.m.	**Navy**	No. 15 Notre Dame	Notre Dame Stadium • South Bend, IN (rivalry)	NBC	**L** 24–41	80,795	
October 10	3:30 p.m.	Syracuse	**South Florida**	Raymond James Stadium • Tampa, FL	CBSSN	**W** 45–24	27,235	
October 10	3:45 p.m.	**Connecticut**	**UCF**	Bright House Networks Stadium • Orlando, FL	ESPNews	**CONN** 40–13	26,669	
October 10	6:00 p.m.	Louisiana–Monroe	**Tulsa**	Skelly Field at H. A. Chapman Stadium • Tulsa, OK	ESPN3	**W** 34–24	17,490	
October 10	7:30 p.m.	**East Carolina**	BYU	LaVell Edwards Stadium • Provo, UT	ESPNU	**L** 38–45	60,186	
^{#}Rankings from AP Poll released prior to game. All times are in Eastern Time.

Date	Bye Week	
October 10	Cincinnati	Memphis

=== Week 7 ===
Date	Time	Visiting team	Home team	Site	TV	Result	Attendance	Ref.
October 16	8:00 p.m.	**Cincinnati**	BYU	LaVell Edwards Stadium • Provo, UT	ESPN	**L** 24–38	57,612	
October 16	9:00 p.m.	No. 24 **Houston**	**Tulane**	Yulman Stadium • New Orleans, LA	ESPNU	**HOU** 42–7	21,522	
October 17	12:00 p.m.	**South Florida**	**Connecticut**	Pratt & Whitney Stadium at Rentschler Field • East Hartford, CT	ESPNU	**USF** 28–20	31,719	
October 17	12:00 p.m.	**Tulsa**	**East Carolina**	Dowdy–Ficklen Stadium • Greenville, NC	ESPNews	**ECU** 30–17	43,065	
October 17	12:00 p.m.	No. 13 Ole Miss	**Memphis**	Liberty Bowl Memorial Stadium • Memphis, TN	ABC	**W** 37–24	60,241	
October 17	7:30 p.m.	**UCF**	**Temple**	Lincoln Financial Field • Philadelphia, PA	CBSSN	**TEM** 30–16	31,372	
^{#}Rankings from AP Poll released prior to game. All times are in Eastern Time.

Date	Bye Week	
October 17	Navy	SMU

=== Week 8 ===
Date	Time	Visiting team	Home team	Site	TV	Result	Attendance	Ref.
October 22	7:00 p.m.	No. 22 **Temple**	East Carolina	Dowdy–Ficklen Stadium • Greenville, NC	ESPN2	**TEM** 24–14	39,417	
October 23	8:00 p.m.	No. 18 **Memphis**	Tulsa	Skelly Field at H. A. Chapman Stadium • Tulsa, OK	ESPN	**MEM** 66–42	20,216	
October 24	12:00 p.m.	No. 21 **Houston**	UCF	Bright House Networks Stadium • Orlando, FL	ESPNews	**HOU** 59–10	28,350	
October 24	1:00 p.m.	**Tulane**	Navy	Navy–Marine Corps Memorial Stadium • Annapolis, MD	CBSSN	**NAVY** 31–14	32,033	
October 24	4:00 p.m.	**SMU**	South Florida	Raymond James Stadium • Tampa, FL	ESPNews	**USF** 38–14	24,338	
October 24	4:30 p.m.	**Connecticut**	Cincinnati	Nippert Stadium • Cincinnati, OH	CBSSN	**CIN** 37–13	40,124	
^{#}Rankings from AP Poll released prior to game. All times are in Eastern Time.

=== Week 9 ===
Date	Time	Visiting team	Home team	Site	TV	Result	Attendance	Ref.
October 30	7:00 p.m.	**East Carolina**	**Connecticut**	Pratt & Whitney Stadium at Rentschler Field • East Hartford, CT	ESPNU	**CONN** 31–10	23,168	
October 31	12:00 p.m.	**UCF**	**Cincinnati**	Nippert Stadium • Cincinnati, OH	ESPNews	**CIN** 52–7	30,131	
October 31	12:00 p.m.	**South Florida**	**Navy**	Navy–Marine Corps Memorial Stadium • Annapolis, MD	CBSSN	**NAVY** 29–17	26,766	
October 31	4:00 p.m.	**Tulsa**	**SMU**	Gerald J. Ford Stadium • Dallas, TX	ESPNews	**TUL** 40–10	18,217	
October 31	7:00 p.m.	**Tulane**	No. 16 **Memphis**	Liberty Bowl Memorial Stadium • Memphis, TN	CBSSN	**MEM** 41–10	30,381	
October 31	7:00 p.m.	Vanderbilt	No. 18 **Houston**	TDECU Stadium • Houston, TX	ESPN2	**W** 34–0	29,565	
October 31	8:00 p.m.	No. 9 Notre Dame	No. 21 **Temple**	Lincoln Financial Field • Philadelphia, PA	ABC	**L** 20–24	69,280	
^{#}Rankings from AP Poll released prior to game. All times are in Eastern Time.

=== Week 10 ===
Date	Time	Visiting team	Home team	Site	TV	Result	Attendance	Ref.
November 6	8:00 p.m.	No. 22 **Temple**	**SMU**	Gerald J. Ford Stadium • Dallas, TX	ESPN2	**TEM** 60–40	17,232	
November 7	12:00 p.m.	**UCF**	**Tulsa**	Skelly Field at H. A. Chapman Stadium • Tulsa, OK	ESPNews	**TUL** 45–30	16,128	
November 7	3:30 p.m.	**Cincinnati**	No. 25 **Houston**	TDECU Stadium • Houston, TX	ESPN2	**HOU** 33–30	32,889	
November 7	4:00 p.m.	**Connecticut**	**Tulane**	Yulman Stadium • New Orleans, LA	ESPNews	**CONN** 7–3	26,775	
November 7	7:00 p.m.	**Navy**	No. 13 **Memphis**	Liberty Bowl Memorial Stadium • Memphis, TN	ESPN2	**NAVY** 45–20	55,212	
November 7	7:30 p.m.	**South Florida**	**East Carolina**	Dowdy–Ficklen Stadium • Greenville, NC	CBSSN	**USF** 22–17	45,194	
^{#}Rankings from AP Poll released prior to game. All times are in Eastern Time.

=== Week 11 ===
Date	Time	Visiting team	Home team	Site	TV	Result	Attendance	Ref.
November 14	12:00 p.m.	**Tulane**	Army	Michie Stadium • West Point, NY	CBSSN	**W** 34–31	31,217	
November 14	3:30 p.m.	**SMU**	No. 20 **Navy**	Navy-Marine Corps Memorial Stadium • Annapolis, MD (Gansz Trophy)	CBSSN	**NAVY** 55–14	35,778	
November 14	7:00 p.m.	No. 21 **Memphis**	No. 24 **Houston**	TDECU Stadium • Houston, TX	ESPN2	**HOU** 35–34	42,159	
November 14	7:00 p.m.	No. 22 **Temple**	**South Florida**	Raymond James Stadium • Tampa, FL	CBSSN	**USF** 44–23	28,393	
November 14	7:30 p.m.	**Tulsa**	**Cincinnati**	Nippert Stadium • Cincinnati, OH	ESPNews	**CIN** 49–38	35,015	
^{#}Rankings from AP Poll released prior to game. All times are in Eastern Time.

Date	Bye Week		
November 14	UCF	Connecticut	East Carolina

=== Week 12 ===
Date	Time	Visiting team	Home team	Site	TV	Result	Attendance	Ref.
November 19	7:30 p.m.	**East Carolina**	UCF	Bright House Networks Stadium • Orlando, FL (rivalry)	ESPN	**ECU** 44–7	23,734	
November 20	8:00 p.m.	**Cincinnati**	South Florida	Raymond James Stadium • Tampa, FL	CBSSN	**USF** 65–27	26,522	
November 21	12:00 p.m.	No. 21 **Memphis**	Temple	Lincoln Financial Field • Philadelphia, PA	ESPNU	**TEM** 31–12	31,708	
November 21	3:30 p.m.	No. 19 **Houston**	Connecticut	Pratt & Whitney Stadium at Rentschler Field • East Hartford, CT	ESPNU	**CONN** 20–17	26,879	
November 21	7:00 p.m.	No. 16 **Navy**	Tulsa	Skelly Field at H. A. Chapman Stadium • Tulsa, OK	CBSSN	**NAVY** 44–21	22,749	
November 21	8:00 p.m.	**Tulane**	SMU	Gerald J. Ford Stadium • Dallas, TX	ESPNews	**SMU** 49–21	30,075	
^{#}Rankings from AP Poll released prior to game. All times are in Eastern Time.

=== Week 13 ===
Date	Time	Visiting team	Home team	Site	TV	Result	Attendance	Ref.
November 26	7:30 p.m.	**South Florida**	**UCF**	Bright House Networks Stadium • Orlando, FL (War on I–4)	ESPN	**USF** 44–3	25,967	
November 27	12:00 p.m.	No. 16 **Navy**	No. 19 **Houston**	TDECU Stadium • Houston, TX	ABC	**HOU** 52–31	40,562	
November 27	8:00 p.m.	**Tulsa**	**Tulane**	Yulman Stadium • New Orleans, LA	ESPNU	**TULSA** 45–34	22,672	
November 28	12:00 p.m.	**Cincinnati**	**East Carolina**	Dowdy–Ficklen Stadium • Greenville, NC	CBSSN	**CIN** 19–16	40,743	
November 28	12:00 p.m.	**SMU**	No. 21 **Memphis**	Liberty Bowl Memorial Stadium • Memphis, TN	ESPNews	**MEM** 63–0	30,075	
November 28	7:00 p.m.	**Connecticut**	**Temple**	Lincoln Financial Field • Philadelphia, PA (7:05 p.m.)	ESPNU	**TEMP** 27–3	28,236	
^{#}Rankings from AP Poll released prior to game. All times are in Eastern Time.

=== The American Championship ===
Date	Time	Visiting team	Home team	Site	TV	Result	Attendance	Ref.
December 5	12:00 p.m.	No. 20 **Temple**	No. 17 **Houston**	TDECU Stadium • Houston, TX (The American Championship)	ABC	**HOU** 24–13	35,721	
^{#}Rankings from AP Poll released prior to game. All times are in Eastern Time.

=== Week 15 ===
Date	Time	Visiting team	Home team	Site	TV	Result	Attendance	Ref.
December 12	3:00 p.m.	Army	No. 21 **Navy**	Lincoln Financial Field • Philadelphia, PA (116th Army–Navy Game/Commander-in-Chief's Trophy)	CBS	**W** 21–17	69,722	
^{#}Rankings from AP Poll released prior to game. All times are in Eastern Time.

Rankings are from AP Poll. All times Eastern Time Zone.

== Bowl games ==
Legend
The American win
The American loss

Bowl game	Date	Site	Television	Time	American team	Opponent	Score	Attendance
Miami Beach Bowl	December 21	Marlins Park • Miami, FL	ESPN	2:30 p.m.	South Florida	WKU	35–45	21,712
Boca Raton Bowl	December 22	FAU Stadium • Boca Raton, FL	ESPN	7:00 p.m.	#24 Temple	Toledo	17–32	25,908
Hawaiʻi Bowl	December 24	Aloha Stadium • Honolulu, HI	ESPN	8:00 p.m.	Cincinnati	San Diego State	7–42	22,793
St. Petersburg Bowl	December 26	Tropicana Field • St. Petersburg, FL	ESPN	11:00 a.m.	UConn	Marshall	10–16	14,652
Independence Bowl	December 26	Independence Stadium • Shreveport, LA	ESPN	5:45 p.m.	Tulsa	Virginia Tech	52–55	31,289
Military Bowl	December 28	Navy–Marine Corps Memorial Stadium • Annapolis, MD	ESPN	2:30 p.m.	#21 Navy	Pittsburgh	44–28	36,352
Birmingham Bowl	December 30	Legion Field • Birmingham, AL	ESPN	12:00 p.m.	Memphis	Auburn	10–31	59,430
New Years Six bowl games
Peach Bowl	December 31	Georgia Dome • Atlanta, GA	ESPN	12:00 p.m.	#18 Houston	#9 Florida State	38–24	71,007

(Rankings from final CFP Poll; All times Eastern)

== Selection of teams ==
- Bowl eligible

Cincinnati, Connecticut, Houston, Memphis, Navy, South Florida, Temple, Tulsa

- Bowl-ineligible

East Carolina, SMU, Tulane, UCF

== Records against FBS conferences ==
2015 records against FBS conferences:

Conference	Record
ACC	6–4
Big Ten	1–1
Big 12	1–3
C-USA	3–3
Independents	3–5
MAC	3–1
Mountain West	2–1
Pac-12	0–1
SEC	2–4
Sun Belt	2–0
Total	22–23

=== The American vs. Power Conferences ===
Legend
The American win
The American loss

Date	Visitor	Home	Winning team	Opponent Conference
September 3	Duke	Tulane	Duke	ACC
September 4	Baylor	SMU	Baylor	Big 12
September 5	Penn State	Temple	Temple	Big Ten
September 12	USF	Florida State	Florida State	ACC
September 12	Houston	Louisville	Houston	ACC
September 12	Tulane	Georgia Tech	Georgia Tech	ACC
September 12	Memphis	Kansas	Memphis	Big 12
September 12	UCF	Stanford	Stanford	Pac 12
September 12	East Carolina	Florida	Florida	SEC
September 19	Tulsa	Oklahoma	Oklahoma	Big 12
September 19	SMU	TCU	TCU	Big 12
September 19	UConn	Missouri	Missouri	SEC
September 19	USF	Maryland	Maryland	Big Ten
September 26	East Carolina	Virginia Tech	East Carolina	ACC
September 26	UCF	South Carolina	South Carolina	SEC
October 1	Miami (FL)	Cincinnati	Cincinnati	ACC
October 10	Navy	Notre Dame	Notre Dame	IND
October 10	Syracuse	USF	USF	ACC
October 17	Ole Miss	Memphis	Memphis	SEC
October 31	Vanderbilt	Houston	Houston	SEC
October 31	Notre Dame	Temple	Notre Dame	IND
December 26‡	Virginia Tech	Tulsa	Virginia Tech	ACC
December 28‡	Pittsburgh	Navy	Navy	ACC
December 30‡	Auburn	Memphis	Auburn	SEC
December 31‡	Florida State	Houston	Houston	ACC

‡This game was played at a neutral site.

== Players of the Week ==
Week	Offensive			Defensive			Special teams		
Week	Player	Position	Team	Player	Position	Team	Player	Position	Team
Week 1	Keevan Lucas	WR	TUL	Tyler Matakevich	LB	TEM	Roderick Proctor	WR	MEM
Week 2	Greg Ward Jr.	QB	HOU	Tyler Matakevich	LB	TEM	Brandon Wilson; Jahad Thomas	CB; RB	HOU; TEM
Week 3	Keenan Reynolds	QB	NAVY	Eric Wilson	LB	CIN	Jake Elliott	K	MEM
Week 4	Keenan Reynolds	QB	NAVY	William Jackson III	CB	HOU	Spencer Smith	P	MEM
Week 5	Greg Ward Jr.	QB	HOU	Montese Overton	LB	E CAR	Nick Jacobs	P	MEM
Week 6	Greg Ward Jr.	QB	HOU	Steven Taylor	LB	HOU	Arkeel Newsome	RB	CONN
Week 7	Paxton Lynch	QB	MEM	Josh Hawkins	CB	E CAR	Demarcus Ayers	WR	HOU
Week 8	Gunner Kiel	QB	CIN	Steven Taylor	LB	HOU	Jake Elliott	K	MEM
Week 9	Chris Swain	FB	NAVY	Jamar Summers	CB	CONN	Alex Barta	P	NAVY
Week 10	Marlon Mack	RB	USF	Elandon Roberts	LB	HOU	Andrew DiRocco	K	TUL
Week 11	Noel Thomas	WR	CONN	Deatrick Nichols	CB	USF	Davis Plowman	K	ECU
Week 12	Paxton Lynch	QB	MEM	Tyler Matakevich	LB	TEMP	Andrew Gantz	K	CIN

== Awards and honors ==
=== Conference awards ===
The following individuals received postseason honors as voted by the American Athletic Conference football coaches at the end of the season

2015 American Athletic Conference Individual Awards
Award	Recipient(s)
Offensive Player of the Year	Keenan Reynolds, QB, Navy
Defensive Player of the Year	Tyler Matakevich, LB, Temple
Special Teams Player of the Year	Jake Elliott, K, Memphis
Rookie of the Year	Tre'Quan Smith, WR, UCF
Coach of the Year	Tom Herman, Houston; Ken Niumatalolo, Navy

2015 All-American Athletic Conference Football Teams
First Team		Second Team	
Offense	Defense	Offense	Defense
WR – Demarcus Ayers, HOU; WR – Keyarris Garrett, TUL; OT – Parker Ehinger, CIN; OT – Taylor Fallin, MEM; OG – E.K. Binns, NAVY; OG – Eric Lofton, TEMP; C – Kyle Friend, TEMP; TE – Bryce Williams, ECU; QB – Paxton Lynch, MEM; QB – Keenan Reynolds, NAVY; RB – Marlon Mack, USF; RB – Jahad Thomas, TEMP; K – Jake Elliott, MEM; RS – Demarcus Ayers, HOU	DL – Will Anthony, NAVY; DL – Matt Ioannidis, TEMP; DL – Nate D. Smith, TEMP; DL – Tanzel Smart, TULN; LB – Zeek Bigger, ECU; LB – Elandon Roberts, HOU; LB – Tyler Matakevich^{^}, TEMP; LB – Nico Marley, TULN; CB – Jamar Summers, CONN; CB – Deatrick Nichols, USF; S – Trevon Stewart, HOU; S – Alex Wells, TEMP; P – Spencer Smith, MEM	WR – Shaq Washington, CIN; WR – Zay Jones, ECU; OT – Alex Cooper, HOU; OT – Dion Dawkins, TEMP; OG – Ryan Leahy, CIN; OG – Thor Jozwiak, USF; C – Deyshawn Bond, CIN; TE – Sean Price, USF; QB – Greg Ward, HOU; RB – Kenneth Farrow, HOU; RB – Chris Swain, NAVY; K – Andrew Gantz, CIN; RS – Rodney Adams, USF	DL – Silverberry Mouhon, CIN; DL – Julian Campenni, CONN; DL – B.J. Singleton, HOU; DL – Eric Lee, USF; DL – Eric Wilson, CIN; LB – Montese Overton, ECU; LB – Steven Taylor, HOU; LB – Auggie Sanchez, USF; CB – William Jackson III, HOU; CB – Sean Chandler, TEMP; S – Andrew Adams, CONN; S – Adrian McDonald, HOU; P – Caleb Houston, UCF; P – Mattias Ciabatti, USF
^{^} - denotes unanimous selection Additional players added to the All-American teams due to ties in the voting

== NFL draft ==
The following list includes all AAC players who were drafted in the 2016 NFL draft.

Player	Position	School	Draft Round	Round Pick	Overall Pick	Team
William Jackson III	CB	Houston	1	24	24	Cincinnati Bengals
Paxton Lynch	QB	Memphis	1	26	26	Denver Broncos
Tavon Young	CB	Temple	4	6	104	Baltimore Ravens
Parker Ehinger	OG	Cincinnati	4	7	105	Kansas City Chiefs
Chris Moore	WR	Cincinnati	4	9	107	Baltimore Ravens
Matt Ioannidis	DT	Temple	5	13	152	Washington Redskins
Keenan Reynolds	RB	Navy	6	7	182	Baltimore Ravens
Elandon Roberts	ILB	Houston	6	39	214	New England Patriots
DeMarcus Ayers	WR	Houston	7	8	229	Pittsburgh Steelers
Tyler Matakevich	OLB	Temple	7	25	246	Pittsburgh Steelers

== Attendance ==
Team	Stadium	Capacity	Game 1	Game 2	Game 3	Game 4	Game 5	Game 6	Game 7	Total	Average	% of Capacity
Cincinnati	Nippert Stadium	40,000	39,095	38,112	40,101	40,124	30,131	35,015	—	222,578	37,096	92.74%
Connecticut	Pratt & Whitney Stadium at Rentschler Field	40,642	26,113	28,260	33,204	31,719	23,168	26,879	—	169,343	28,224	69.44%
East Carolina	Dowdy–Ficklen Stadium	50,000	40,712	50,514	43,065	39,417	45,194	40,743	—	218,902	43,780	87.56%
Houston	TDECU Stadium	40,000	30,749	35,257	25,204	29,565	32,889	42,159	40,562	195,553	32,592	81.48%
Memphis	Liberty Bowl Memorial Stadium	59,308	41,740	45,172	60,241	30,381	55,212	30,075	—	232,736	46,547	78.48%
Navy	Navy–Marine Corps Memorial Stadium	34,000	28,015	34,717	32,705	32,033	26,766	35,778	—	190,014	31,669	93.14%
SMU	Gerald J. Ford Stadium	32,000	32,047	25,401	22,314	17,136	18,217	17,232	14,954	147,301	21,043	65.76%
South Florida	Raymond James Stadium	65,890	30,034	22,546	27,235	39,417	28,393	26,522	—	159,468	26,578	40.34%
Temple	Lincoln Financial Field	69,176	69,176	35,179	31,372	69,280	31,708	28,236	—	236,715	47,343	68.44%
Tulane	Yulman Stadium	30,000	25,470	21,114	20,024	21,522	26,775	22,672	—	137,577	22,930	76.43%
Tulsa	Skelly Field at H. A. Chapman Stadium	30,000	24,001	17,146	17,490	20,216	16,128	22,749	—	117,730	19,622	65.41%
UCF	Bright House Networks Stadium	44,206	39,184	36,484	26,669	28,350	23,734	25,967	—	180,388	30,065	68.01%

^* Games highlighted in green were sell-outs.
