= Aaron Valdes =

American basketball player (born 1993)

No. 32 – Astros de Jalisco
- Position: Shooting guard / small forward
- League: LNBP

Personal information
- Born: June 15, 1993 (age 33) Whittier, California
- Listed height: 6 ft 5 in (1.96 m)
- Listed weight: 209 lb (95 kg)

Career information
- High school: La Serna (Whittier, California); La Jolla Prep (La Jolla, California)
- College: Hawaii (2013–2016)
- NBA draft: 2016: undrafted
- Playing career: 2016–present

Career history
- 2016–2019: Soles de Mexicali
- 2019–2020: Leñadores de Durango
- 2020–2021: Maccabi Haifa B.C.
- 2021–2022: Plateros de Fresnillo
- 2022–present: Astros de Jalisco

Career highlights
- Second-team All-Big West (2016)

Aaron Valdes (born June 15, 1993) is an American professional basketball player for Astros de Jalisco of the Liga Nacional de Baloncesto Profesional. He plays the guard and forward positions.

== Early life and high school career ==
Valdes was born in Whittier, California and attended La Serna High School ('11). He played basketball for the school, and as a junior averaging 18.7 points and 12.8 rebounds per game. He was named league MVP and first-team all-area. As a senior, he averaged 19.6 points and 13.6 rebounds per game, and was named first-team all-league. He also played water polo, and in 2009 was named league MVP and first-team all-area, while in 2010 he was named All-America, Del Rio League MVP, and California Interscholastic Federation player of the year.

He attended La Jolla Prep in 2011–12, and played basketball averaging 19.2 points, 6.8 rebounds, and three steals per game.

== College career ==
Valdes attended the University of Hawaii. At the start of his college career, he had a 41-inch vertical leap. Playing for the basketball team as a sophomore in 2014–15, he averaged 1.7 steals per game (third in the Big West), and 13.7 points per game (10th in the league), and was seventh in two-point field goal percentage (.516). He was named Big West Conference honorable mention. As a junior in 2015–16 he scored 14.1 points per game (eighth in the league) and blocked 0.7 shots per game (ninth in the league), and was fifth in two-point field goal percentage (.581). He was named second-team all-Big West. He turned pro after his junior year.

== Professional career ==
On August 9, 2020, Valdes signed with Maccabi Haifa of the Israeli Basketball Premier League. He averaged 2.8 points and 1.5 rebounds per game in four games before leaving the team in November. On August 10, 2021, Valdes signed with the Plateros de Fresnillo of the Liga Nacional de Baloncesto Profesional.
