= Owen Long =

American football player

No. 22 – Arizona State Sun Devils
- Position: Linebacker
- Class: Junior

Personal information
- Listed height: 6 ft 2 in (1.88 m)
- Listed weight: 230 lb (104 kg)

Career information
- High school: La Serna (Whittier, California)
- College: Colorado State (2024–2025); Arizona State (2026–present)

Awards and highlights
- First-team All-Mountain West (2025)
- Stats at ESPN

Owen Long is an American football linebacker for the Arizona State Sun Devils. He previously played for the Colorado State Rams.

== Early life ==
Long attended La Serna High School in Whittier, California. Coming out of high school, he was rated as a three-star recruit by 247Sports and initially committed to play college football for the Nevada Wolfpack over offers from other schools such as Air Force, Army, Arkansas State, Washington State. However, Long later flipped his commitment to play for the Colorado State Rams.

== College career ==
=== Colorado State ===
As a freshman in 2024, Long appeared in all 13 games, notching 45 tackles with half a tackle going for a loss and two pass deflections. He entered the 2025 season as a starter for the Rams defense. In the season opener, Long racked up 13 tackles in a loss to Washington. In week 3, he notched 14 tackles in a loss against UTSA. In week 6, Long recorded a career-high 17 tackles in an upset win against Fresno State. During the 2025 season, he totaled 151 tackles with five going for a loss, two sacks, five pass deflections, two fumble recoveries, and a forced fumble, earning first-team all-Mountain West honors while also being named a third-team all-American by the Associated Press. After the conclusion of the season, Long entered the NCAA transfer portal.

=== Arizona State ===
Long transferred to play for the Arizona State Sun Devils.

== See also ==
- List of NCAA major college football yearly tackles leaders
