= Matt Ioannidis =

American football player (born 1994)

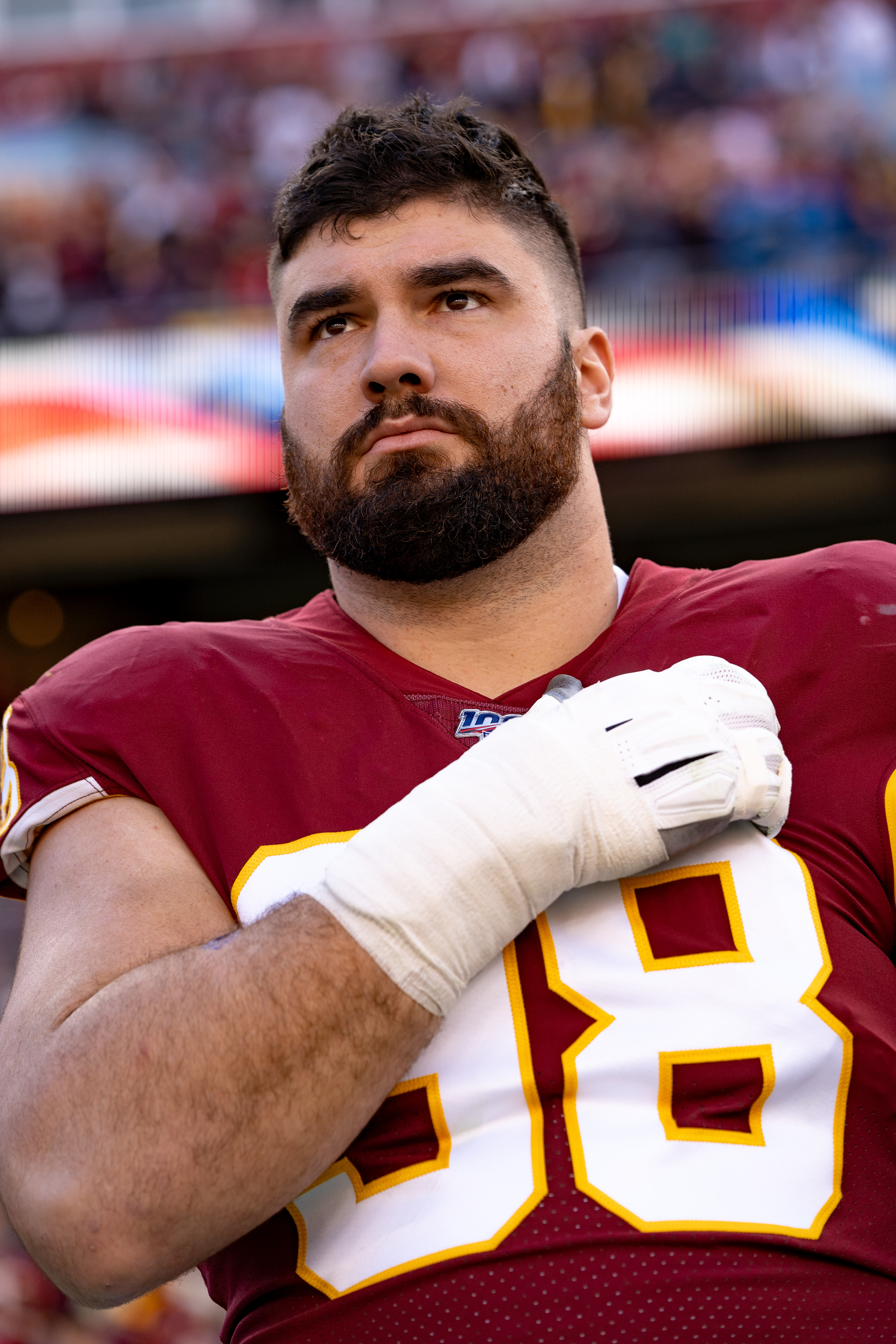
- Ioannidis with the Washington Redskins in 2019

No. 98, 99
- Position: Defensive lineman

Personal information
- Born: January 11, 1994 (age 32); Ringoes, New Jersey, U.S.
- Listed height: 6 ft 3 in (1.91 m)
- Listed weight: 310 lb (141 kg)

Career information
- High school: Hunterdon Central Regional (Flemington, New Jersey)
- College: Temple (2012–2015)
- NFL draft: 2016: 5th round, 152nd overall pick

Career history

Playing
- Washington Redskins / Football Team (2016–2021); Carolina Panthers (2022)

Coaching
- Mechanicsburg Area (PA) (2024–present) Assistant defensive line coach

Awards and highlights
- First-team All-AAC (2015); Second-team All-AAC (2014)

Career NFL statistics
- Total tackles: 212
- Sacks: 25.5
- Forced fumbles: 3
- Fumble recoveries: 1
- Stats at Pro Football Reference

Matthew J. Ioannidis (/ˌaɪəˈnaɪdɪs/ EYE-uh-NYE-dis; born January 11, 1994) is an American former professional football player who was a defensive lineman for seven seasons in the National Football League (NFL). He played college football for the Temple Owls and was selected by the Washington Redskins in the fifth round of the 2016 NFL draft. Ioannidis played six seasons with Washington before spending the seventh and final season of his NFL career with the Carolina Panthers.

== Early life ==
Ioannidis grew up in the Ringoes section of Raritan Township, New Jersey and attended Hunterdon Central Regional High School. The middle of three boys, Matt and his brothers Andrew and Kevin, grew up playing football, basketball, and lacrosse.

== College career ==
Ioannidis attended and played college football at Temple University from 2012 to 2015.

=== Statistics ===
Year	G	Solo	Ast	Tot	Loss	Sk	PD	FR	FF
2012	2	1	2	3	0	0	0	0	0
2013	11	23	3	26	7.5	3	0	0	1
2014	12	25	19	44	11	3.5	3	0	0
2015	13	27	15	42	11.5	3.5	5	2	0
Career	38	76	39	115	30	10	8	2	1

== Professional career ==
Pre-draft measurables
Height	Weight	Arm length	Hand span	40-yard dash	10-yard split	20-yard split	20-yard shuttle	Three-cone drill	Vertical jump	Broad jump	Bench press
6 ft 3 1/2 in (1.92 m)	299 lb (136 kg)	32 3/8 in (0.82 m)	10 1/8 in (0.26 m)	5.03 s	1.76 s	2.92 s	4.66 s	7.56 s	28.0 in (0.71 m)	9 ft 5 in (2.87 m)	32 reps
All values from NFL Combine/Pro Day

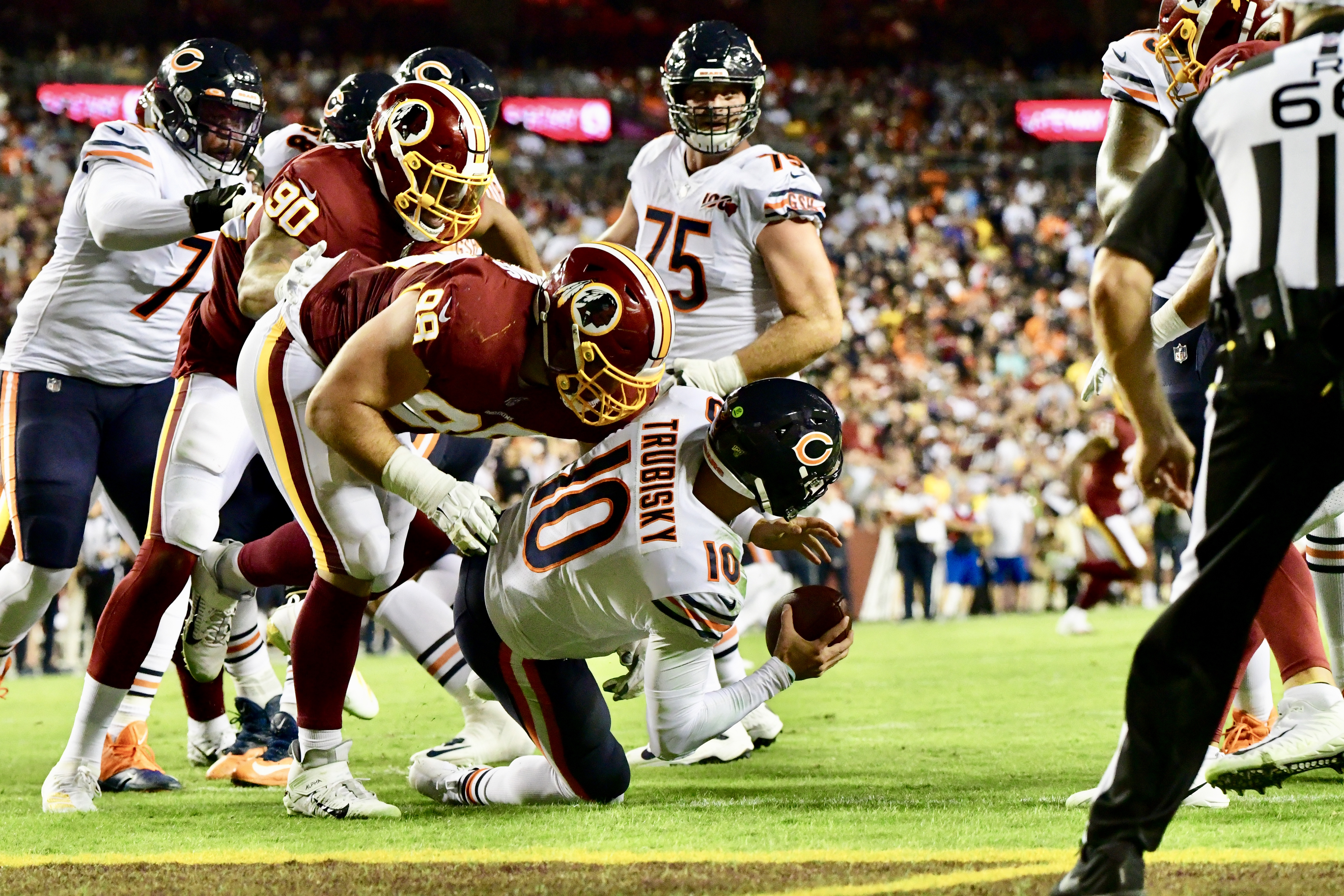
Ioannidis sacking Chicago Bears quarterback Mitchell Trubisky in 2019.

=== Washington Redskins / Football Team ===
Ioannidis was selected by the Washington Redskins in the fifth round, 152nd overall, in the 2016 NFL draft. On September 3, 2016, he was waived by the Redskins, but re-signed with their practice squad a day later. He was promoted to the active roster after Kedric Golston was placed on injured reserve.

Ioannidis made his NFL debut on September 25, 2016, in a 29–27 win against the New York Giants. He appeared in ten games during his rookie season, making seven tackles.

In 2018, Ioannidis played in 14 games with nine starts, recording 31 combined tackles, a forced fumble, and 7.5 sacks, which finished third on the team. On April 18, 2019, Ioannidis signed a three-year, $21.75 million contract extension with the team. Ioannidis finished the 2019 season setting new career highs with 64 tackles, 8.5 sacks, and one pass deflection.

Ioannidis tore his biceps in the Week 3 2020 season game against the Cleveland Browns and was placed on injured reserve. He finished the 2020 season with seven tackles and 1.5 sacks over three games. He tested positive for COVID-19 in November 2020 and was placed on the team's COVID-19 reserve list until recovering and being placed back on injured reserve later that month.

On December 15, 2021, Ioannidis was placed on the COVID-19 reserve list, but reactivated five days later. Ioannidis was released on March 16, 2022.

=== Carolina Panthers ===
On March 18, 2022, Ioannidis signed with the Carolina Panthers. He played in and started 13 games during the 2022 season and recorded 37 tackles, 1.5 sacks, 1 pass deflection, and 1 forced fumble.

His NFL playing career ended after he accepted his first coaching job in 2024.

== Coaching career ==
In September 2024, it was announced that Ioannidis was hired by Mechanicsburg Area Senior High School as an assistant defensive line coach.
