= Tyler Matakevich =

American football player (born 1992)

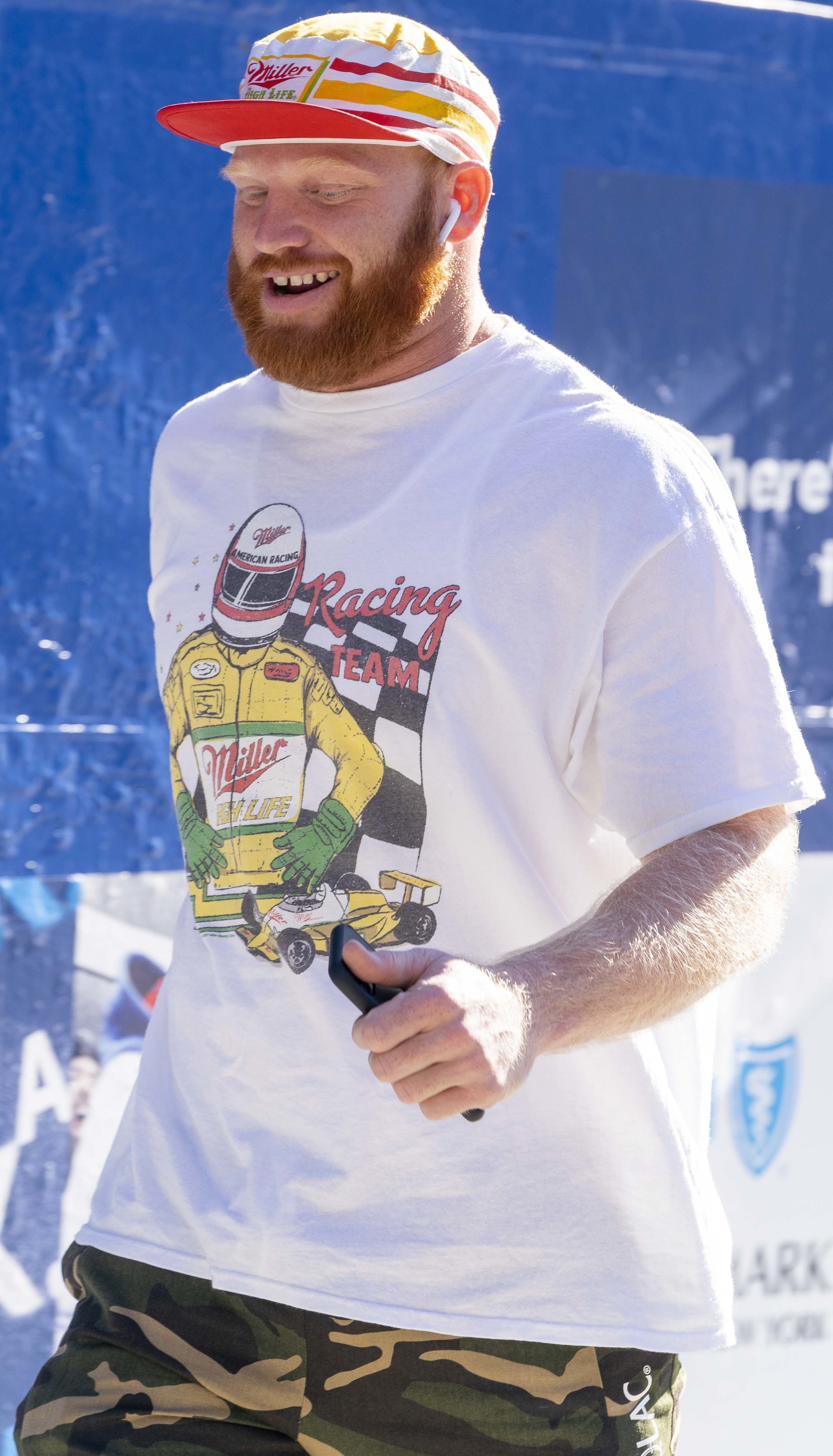
- Matakevich in 2021

Profile
- Position: Linebacker

Personal information
- Born: December 22, 1992 (age 33); Stratford, Connecticut, U.S.
- Listed height: 6 ft 1 in (1.85 m)
- Listed weight: 235 lb (107 kg)

Career information
- High school: St. Joseph (Trumbull, Connecticut)
- College: Temple (2012–2015)
- NFL draft: 2016: 7th round, 246th overall pick

Career history
- Pittsburgh Steelers (2016–2019); Buffalo Bills (2020–2023); Pittsburgh Steelers (2024)

Awards and highlights
- Bronko Nagurski Trophy (2015); Chuck Bednarik Award (2015); Consensus All-American (2015); AAC Defensive Player of the Year (2015); First team All-AAC (2015); Freshman All-American (2012); Big East Rookie of the Year (2012); Second-team All-Big East (2012)

Career NFL statistics as of 2024
- Total tackles: 136
- Pass deflections: 4
- Interceptions: 1
- Stats at Pro Football Reference

Tyler John Matakevich (born December 22, 1992) is an American professional football linebacker. He played college football for the Temple Owls. He was selected by the Pittsburgh Steelers in the seventh round of the 2016 NFL draft. He has also been a member of the Buffalo Bills.

== Early life ==
Matakevich attended St. Joseph High School in Trumbull, Connecticut. He played linebacker and running back on the football team and also played baseball. He finished his high school career with 2,357 yards rushing, 1,355 yards receiving, 3,898 all-purpose yards on offense, and 371 tackles, 4.5 sacks, three forced fumbles, six fumble recoveries, and eight interceptions on defense. Over the course of his career, he scored 59 total touchdowns. During a pre-season scrimmage his senior year he broke his foot and wound up missing five games, therefore after high school graduation he attended Milford Academy. After one year at Milford Academy, Matakevich committed to Temple University to play college football.

== College career ==
As a freshman at Temple in 2012, Matakevich played in all 13 games, making his first start in Week 5 against USF. He became the first freshman in school history to record 100 tackles, finishing with 101. As a sophomore, he had 137 tackles, one sack and one interception. As a junior, he had 117 tackles, 1.5 sacks and one interception. During his senior year, he became the seventh player in FBS history to record 100 tackles all four years. Leading Temple to the inaugural American Athletic Conference (AAC) Championship during his final year of eligibility, Matakevich received national honors including the AAC Defensive Player of the Year, the Bronko Nagurski Trophy and the Chuck Bednarik Award. All three were firsts for Temple football. He also became Temple's third consensus All-American. During the 2015 Boca Raton Bowl, he broke the school's record for career tackles, finishing with 493. For the season he had 138 tackles, 4.5 sacks and five interceptions.

== Professional career ==
Pre-draft measurables
Height	Weight	Arm length	Hand span	40-yard dash	10-yard split	20-yard split	20-yard shuttle	Three-cone drill	Vertical jump	Broad jump	Bench press
6 ft 0 in (1.83 m)	238 lb (108 kg)	31 1/4 in (0.79 m)	9 1/2 in (0.24 m)	4.81 s	1.66 s	2.80 s	4.34 s	7.19 s	31 in (0.79 m)	9 ft 4 in (2.84 m)	22 reps
All values from NFL Combine/Pro Day

=== Pittsburgh Steelers (first stint) ===
==== 2016 ====
The Pittsburgh Steelers selected Matakevich in the seventh round (246th overall) of the 2016 NFL draft. He said, at the time of receiving the call from head coach Mike Tomlin, he was in the process of speaking to other teams about being signed as a priority undrafted free-agent. The Steelers said they selected him because he was their highest rated player on their big board at the time.

On May 5, 2016, the Steelers signed Matakevich to a four-year, $2.40 million rookie contract that includes a signing bonus of $63,502.

Throughout training camp, he competed for a roster spot against veteran Steven Johnson, L. J. Fort, and Travis Feeney. He impressed coaches and showed consistent play in the preseason. Head coach Mike Tomlin named him the backup inside linebacker to Ryan Shazier to start the regular season.

He made his professional regular season debut in the Steelers' season-opening 38–16 victory over the Washington Redskins. The next game, he made his first career tackle in a 24–16 win over the Cincinnati Bengals. On November 6, 2016, he recorded a season-high nine combined tackles in a 30–15 loss to the Miami Dolphins. In the Week 16 match-up against the Baltimore Ravens, he recorded two solo tackles in a 31–27 victory. He finished his rookie season with 20 combined tackles in 16 games. The Pittsburgh Steelers finished the 2016 season first in the AFC North with an 11–5 record and received a playoff berth. On January 8, 2017, Matakevich played in his first career playoff game as the Steelers defeated the Dolphins 30–12 in the AFC Wildcard game.

==== 2017 ====
He returned to training camp in 2017 and competed to a roster spot against Steven Johnson, L. J. Fort, Travis Feeney, Kevin Anderson, Matt Galambos, and Keith Kelsey. He was named backup inside linebacker to Ryan Shazier and Vince Williams to start the season.

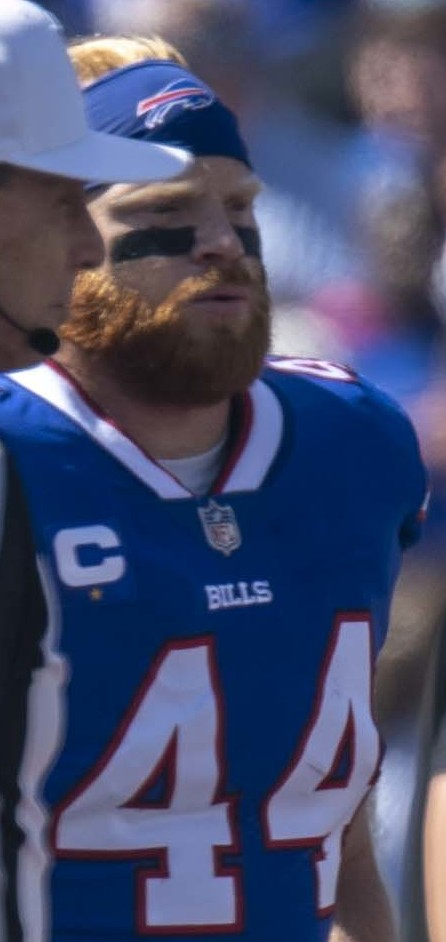
Matakevich with the Bills in 2021

On September 10, 2017, Matakevich blocked a punt by Browns' punter Britton Colquitt during the Steelers' season-opening 21–18 victory over the Cleveland Browns. Teammate Anthony Chickillo recovered the ball in the end zone for a touchdown and made the first score of the Steelers' season. On October 15, 2017, Matakevich recorded four combined tackles in the Steelers' 19–13 victory at the Kansas City Chiefs. On December 4, 2017, he collected a season-high six combined tackles in a 23–20 victory at the Bengals. Matakevich finished the season with 23 combined tackles (18 solo) and a pass deflection in 15 games and zero starts.

=== Buffalo Bills ===
On March 30, 2020, Matakevich signed a two-year contract with the Buffalo Bills.

On March 16, 2021, Matakevich signed a one-year extension through the 2022 season.

On March 13, 2023, Matakevich signed a one-year extension through the 2023 season.

In four years with Buffalo, Matakevich played almost solely on special teams and was a captain for three seasons.

=== Pittsburgh Steelers (second stint) ===
On July 17, 2024, Matakevich signed a one-year contract to return to the Steelers.

== NFL career statistics ==
Legend
**Bold**	Career high

=== Regular season ===
Year	Team	Games		Tackles							Interceptions					
Year	Team	GP	GS	Cmb	Solo	Ast	TFL	QBH	Sck	Sfty	PD	Int	Yds	Y/I	Lng	TD
2016	PIT	16	0	20	16	4	0	0	0.0	0	0	0	0	—	0	0
2017	PIT	15	0	**23**	**18**	5	0	0	0.0	0	1	0	0	—	0	0
2018	PIT	16	1	16	12	4	0	0	0.0	0	0	0	0	—	0	0
2019	PIT	16	0	18	16	2	0	0	0.0	0	0	0	0	—	0	0
2020	BUF	16	0	**23**	12	**11**	0	0	0.0	0	**2**	0	0	—	0	0
2021	BUF	17	0	19	12	7	0	0	0.0	0	1	**1**	**15**	**15.0**	**15**	0
2022	BUF	16	0	6	5	1	0	0	0.0	0	0	0	0	—	0	0
2023	BUF	17	0	7	4	3	0	0	0.0	0	0	0	0	—	0	0
2024	PIT	11	0	4	4	0	0	0	0.0	0	0	0	0	—	0	0
Career		140	1	136	99	37	0	0	0.0	0	4	1	15	15.0	15	0

=== Postseason ===
Year	Team	Games		Tackles						
Year	Team	GP	GS	Cmb	Solo	Ast	TFL	QBH	Sck	Sfty
2016	PIT	3	0	1	1	0	0	0	0.0	0
2017	PIT	1	0	0	0	0	0	0	0.0	0
2020	BUF	3	0	0	0	0	0	0	0.0	0
2021	BUF	2	0	**3**	**2**	**1**	0	0	0.0	0
2022	BUF	2	0	2	**2**	0	0	0	0.0	0
2023	BUF	2	0	1	1	0	0	0	0.0	0
2024	PIT	1	0	0	0	0	0	0	0.0	0
Career		14	0	7	6	1	0	0	0.0	0

== See also ==
- List of NCAA major college football yearly tackles leaders
