= The Alley Cats (doo-wop group) =

American doo-wop group singing in a cappella

The Alley Cats are an American doo-wop group singing in a cappella.

The group originated in 1987, when a concert choir program was having a variety night occurring at Fullerton College. When John Tebay, the choir director, suggested that Andre Peek (1st tenor and lead vocalist at that time) and Armando Fonseca (2nd tenor) perform together, both of them decided to take Mr. Tebays advice and form a quartet, an a cappella group. Two additional members along the way, Royce Reynolds (bass) and Todd Dixon (baritone) got together and the foursome gained notice. Since then The Alley Cats have performed for many audiences, ranging from elementary school fun nights to being Grand.prize.winners on the Gong Show. Performing on the Arsenio Hall show to The Tonight Show with Jay Leno, as well as opening for Leno at his Las Vegas shows. The Alley Cats's sound has been heard as well at The White House. The Alley Cats appeared in the Richard Simmons workout video Dance Your Pants Off! performed the song Celebration.

The Alley Cats have won two Contemporary A Cappella Society awards: one for best album (The Doo-Wop Drive-In Live) and one for best song ("What's Your Name").

== Members ==
- Armando "Mando" Fonseca
- Royce "The Voice" Reynolds
- Andre Peek
- Todd Dixon
- Adam Bastien
- Jeremy Bernard
- Brandon Brigham
- Brian Brigham
- Terron Brooks
- Juan Del Castillo
- Chris Chatham
- Michael Cordero, Jr
- Sean Devine
- Toby Donnelly
- Adam Ellis
- Josh Elmore
- Todd Fournier
- Tim Foust
- Evan Michael Garry
- Phil Gold
- Jeff Grider
- Grant Hendrickson
- Chris Kauffmann
- Jeffrey Landman
- Rick Mallory
- Tonoccus McClain
- Mark Miserrochi
- John O'Campo
- Henry O'Neil
- Greg Perkins
- Allen Read
- Manuel Rodriguez-Ruiz
- Frank Romeo
- Kevin Rose
- Philip A. Tesoro
- Rob Thompson
- Michael Washington
- Bobby Werner
- Hunter Berecochea
