= 2016 Miami Hurricanes football team =

American college football season

2016 Miami Hurricanes football

Russell Athletic Bowl champion

Russell Athletic Bowl, W 31–14 vs. West Virginia
- Conference: Atlantic Coast Conference
- Coastal Division

Ranking
- Coaches: No. 23
- AP: No. 20
- Record: 9–4 (5–3 ACC)
- Head coach: Mark Richt (1st season)
- Offensive coordinator: Thomas Brown (1st season)
- Offensive scheme: Pro-style
- Defensive coordinator: Manny Diaz (1st season)
- Base defense: 4–3
- Home stadium: Hard Rock Stadium

2016 Atlantic Coast Conference football standings
	Conf.			Overall
Team	W		L	W		L
Atlantic Division
No. 1 Clemson xy$#	7	–	1	14	–	1
No. 21 Louisville x	7	–	1	9	–	4
No. 8 Florida State	5	–	3	10	–	3
NC State	3	–	5	7	–	6
Wake Forest	3	–	5	7	–	6
Boston College	2	–	6	7	–	6
Syracuse	2	–	6	4	–	8
Coastal Division
No. 16 Virginia Tech xy	6	–	2	10	–	4
North Carolina	5	–	3	8	–	5
No. 20 Miami (FL)	5	–	3	9	–	4
Pittsburgh	5	–	3	8	–	5
Georgia Tech	4	–	4	9	–	4
Duke	1	–	7	4	–	8
Virginia	1	–	7	2	–	10
Championship: Clemson 42, Virginia Tech 35
# – College Football Playoff champion; $ – Conference champion; x – Division champion/co-champions; y – Championship game participant; Rankings from AP Poll

The 2016 Miami Hurricanes football team represented the University of Miami during the 2016 NCAA Division I FBS football season. It was the Hurricanes' 91st season of football and 13th as a member of the Atlantic Coast Conference. The Hurricanes were led by first-year head coach Mark Richt and played their home games at Hard Rock Stadium. They finished the season 9–4 overall and 5–3 in the ACC to finish in a three-way tie for second place in the Coastal Division. They were invited to the Russell Athletic Bowl where they defeated West Virginia, 31-14.

== Schedule ==
Date	Time	Opponent	Rank	Site	TV	Result	Attendance
September 3	6:00 pm	Florida A&M*		Hard Rock Stadium; Miami Gardens, FL	ACCN+	W 70–3	60,703
September 10	6:00 pm	Florida Atlantic*	No. 25	Hard Rock Stadium; Miami Gardens, FL	ACCN+	W 38–10	57,123
September 17	12:00 pm	at Appalachian State*	No. 25	Kidd Brewer Stadium; Boone, NC	ESPN	W 45–10	34,658
October 1	12:00 pm	at Georgia Tech	No. 14	Bobby Dodd Stadium; Atlanta, GA	ESPN2	W 35–21	53,047
October 8	8:00 pm	No. 23 Florida State	No. 10	Hard Rock Stadium; Miami Gardens, FL (rivalry)	ABC	L 19–20	65,685
October 15	3:30 pm	North Carolina	No. 16	Hard Rock Stadium; Miami Gardens, FL	ABC/ESPN2	L 13–20	58,731
October 20	7:30 pm	at Virginia Tech		Lane Stadium; Blacksburg, VA (rivalry)	ESPN	L 16–37	63,507
October 29	3:30 pm	at Notre Dame*		Notre Dame Stadium; South Bend, IN (rivalry)	NBC	L 27–30	80,795
November 5	12:30 pm	Pittsburgh^{†}		Hard Rock Stadium; Miami Gardens, FL	ACCN	W 51–28	51,796
November 12	2:00 pm	at Virginia		Scott Stadium; Charlottesville, VA	RSN	W 34–14	39,867
November 19	12:30 pm	at NC State		Carter–Finley Stadium; Raleigh, NC	ACCN	W 27–13	56,263
November 26	3:30 pm	Duke		Hard Rock Stadium; Miami Gardens, FL	ESPN2	W 40–21	57,396
December 28	5:30 pm	vs. No. 14 West Virginia*		Camping World Stadium; Orlando, FL (Russell Athletic Bowl)	ESPN	W 31–14	48,625
*Non-conference game; ^{†}Homecoming; Rankings from AP Poll released prior to the game; All times are in Eastern time

== Personnel ==
=== Coaching staff ===
Name	Position	Seasons	Alma mater
Mark Richt	Head coach	1st	Miami (1982)
Manny Diaz	Defensive coordinator/linebackers	1st	Florida State (1995)
Thomas Brown	Offensive coordinator/running backs	1st	Georgia (2008)
Craig Kuligowski	Defensive line	1st	Toledo (1991)
Jon Richt	Quarterbacks	1st	Mars Hill (2012)
Ron Dugans	Wide receivers	1st	Florida State (2002)
Stacy Searels	Offensive line	1st	Auburn (1990)
Todd Hartley	Special teams coordinator/tight ends	1st	Georgia (2008)
Mike Rumph	Cornerbacks	1st	Miami (2002)
Ephraim Banda	Safeties	1st	Incarnate Word (2004)

=== Support staff ===
Name	Position	Seasons	Alma mater
Gus Felder	Strength & conditioning	1st	Penn State (2002)
Mike Zuckerman	Graduate assistant	2nd	Miami (2012)
Alex Devine	Graduate assistant	1st	Mississippi State (2015)

=== Roster ===
2016 Miami Hurricanes football team roster
Players
Coaches
Offense

Pos.	#	Name	Class
RB	1	Mark Walton	So
RB	2	Joseph Yearby	Jr
WR	3	Stacy Coley	Sr
RB	7	Gus Edwards	Jr
WR	8	Braxton Berrios	Jr
WR	9	Malcolm Lewis	Sr
QB	11	Jack Allison	Fr
QB	12	Malik Rosier	So
QB	14	Vincent Testaverde	So
QB	15	Brad Kaaya	Jr
QB	16	Evan Shirreffs	Fr
WR	18	Lawrence Cager	So
QB	19	Tucker Beirne	Fr
QB	20	Michael Welch	Jr
TE	23	Chris Herndon	Jr
RB	24	Travis Homer	Fr
RB	28	Crispian Atkins	So
FB	30	Kevin Carroll	Sr
WR	31	Malik Mayweather	So
RB	32	Trayone Gray	Jr
FB	34	Zackary Lawler	So
WR	35	Austin Pfenninger	Jr
FB	36	Marquez Williams	Sr
FB	37	Cesar Castillo	So
DB	38	Danny Dominguez	So
FB	41	Wyatt Chickillo	Jr
RB	43	T. J. Callan	So
FB	44	Cory Giordano	Fr
WR	45	Chad Allen	Fr
WR	46	O'Juan Carney	Fr
WR	47	Jake Romp	So
OL	52	K. C. McDermott	Jr
OL	54	Hunter Knighton	Jr
OL	59	Justin Goldberg	So
OL	62	Hayden Mahoney	Fr
OL	63	Danny Isidora	Sr
OL	66	Sunny Odogwu	Jr
OL	67	Alex Gall	Sr
OL	68	Nick Linder	Jr
OL	70	George Brown Jr.	Fr
OL	73	Trevor Darling	Jr
OL	74	Tyler Gauthier	So
OL	76	Tre Johnson	Fr
OL	77	Jahair Jones	So
OL	78	Tyree St. Louis	So
OL	79	Bar Milo	Fr
WR	80	Dayall Jones	So
WR	81	Darrell Langham	So
WR	82	Ahmmon Richards	Fr
WR	84	Dionte Mullins	Fr
TE	85	Jovani Haskins	Fr
TE	86	David Njoku	So
TE	87	Michael Irvin II	Fr
TE	88	Malik Curry	Fr

Defense

Pos.	#	Name	Class
DB	4	Jaquan Johnson	So
DL	5	Standish Dobard	Sr
DB	6	Jamal Carter	Sr
DL	7	Kendrick Norton	So
DL	9	Chad Thomas	Jr
DB	12	Malek Young	Fr
DL	19	Scott Patchan	Fr
DB	20	Robert Knowles	Fr
DB	21	Terrance Henley	So
DB	22	Sheldrick Redwine	So
LB	23	Terry McCray	So
DB	24	Josh Johnson	Jr
DB	25	Adrian Colbert	Sr
DB	26	Rayshawn Jenkins	Sr
DB	27	Ryan Mayes	So
DB	28	Mike Jackson Sr.	So
DB	29	Corn Elder	Sr
DB	30	Romeo Finley	Fr
DL	31	Demetrius Jackson	So
DB	32	Tyler Murphy	So
DL	33	Trent Harris	Jr
LB	34	Charles Perry	So
DB	36	Teddy Stavetski	So
DB	37	Jeff James Jr.	Fr
DB	38	Cedrick Wright	Fr
LB	40	Gage Batten	Sr
LB	44	Eddie Dunn	So
LB/FB	47	Dewayne Washington II	Fr
LB	49	Shawn Walker	Fr
LB	52	Jamie Gordinier	Fr
LB	53	Zach McCloud	Fr
LB	55	Shaquille Quarterman	Fr
LB	56	Michael Pinckney	Fr
LB	57	Mike Smith	So
LB	58	Darrion Owens	So
LB	59	Jared Hardie	Fr
DL	80	R. J. McIntosh	So
DL	90	Tyreic Martin	Fr
DL	91	Gerald Willis	So
DL	92	Courtel Jenkins	Jr
DL	93	Pat Bethel	Fr
DL	94	Ryan Fines	Fr
DL	95	Anthony Moten	Jr
DL	99	Joe Jackson	Fr

Special teams

Pos.	#	Name	Class
K/P	15	Michael Badgley	Jr
P/K	16	Justin Vogel	Sr
LS	39	Jordan Butler	So
P	43	Jack Spicer	Fr
LS	55	Frank Gabriel	Sr
LS	57	Sam York	So
LS	61	Jacob Munoz	Fr
K	85	Marco Baeza	So
K	98	Diego Marquez	Jr

Head coach

- Mark Richt

Coordinators/assistant coaches

Legend

- (C) Team captain
- (S) Suspended
- (I) Ineligible
- Injured
- Redshirt

Roster

== Game summaries ==
=== Florida A&M ===
	1	2	3	4	Total
Rattlers	0	3	0	0	3
Hurricanes	14	14	42	0	70

=== Florida Atlantic ===
	1	2	3	4	Total
Owls	0	3	7	0	10
#25 Hurricanes	0	14	10	14	38

=== At Appalachian State ===
	1	2	3	4	Total
#25 Hurricanes	21	3	14	7	45
Mountaineers	0	3	7	0	10

=== At Georgia Tech ===
	1	2	3	4	Total
#14 Hurricanes	7	21	7	0	35
Yellow Jackets	0	14	7	0	21

=== Florida State ===
	1	2	3	4	Total
#23 Seminoles	0	3	14	3	20
#10 Hurricanes	3	10	0	6	19

=== North Carolina ===
	1	2	3	4	Total
Tar Heels	10	10	0	0	20
#16 Hurricanes	0	3	7	3	13

=== At Virginia Tech ===
	1	2	3	4	Total
Hurricanes	3	6	7	0	16
Hokies	3	13	14	7	37

=== At Notre Dame ===
	1	2	3	4	Total
Hurricanes	0	7	10	10	27
Fighting Irish	17	3	0	10	30

=== Pittsburgh ===
	1	2	3	4	Total
Panthers	7	14	0	7	28
Hurricanes	17	10	7	17	51

=== At Virginia ===
	1	2	3	4	Total
Hurricanes	7	10	10	7	34
Cavaliers	7	7	0	0	14

=== At NC State ===
	1	2	3	4	Total
Hurricanes	3	0	14	10	27
Wolfpack	0	3	7	3	13

=== Duke ===
	1	2	3	4	Total
Blue Devils	7	7	0	7	21
Hurricanes	10	6	17	7	40

=== West Virginia–Russell Athletic Bowl ===
	1	2	3	4	Total
#14 Mountaineers	7	0	7	0	14
Hurricanes	0	21	10	0	31

== Rankings ==
Ranking movements Legend: ██ Increase in ranking ██ Decrease in ranking — = Not ranked RV = Received votes
	Week															
Poll	Pre	1	2	3	4	5	6	7	8	9	10	11	12	13	14	Final
AP	RV	25	25	15	14	10	16	RV	—	—	—	—	—	RV	RV	20
Coaches	RV	RV	25	19	14	10	17	RV	RV	—	—	—	RV	RV	RV	23
CFP	Not released									—	—	—	—	—	—	Not released

== 2017 NFL draft ==
Player	Position	Round	Pick	Team
David Njoku	Tight end	1	29	Cleveland Browns
Rayshawn Jenkins	Safety	4	113	Los Angeles Chargers
Corn Elder	Cornerback	5	152	Carolina Panthers
Danny Isidora	Offensive Guard	5	180	Minnesota Vikings
Brad Kaaya	Quarterback	6	215	Detroit Lions
Stacy Coley	Wide receiver	7	219	Minnesota Vikings
Adrian Colbert	Defensive back	7	229	San Francisco 49ers
Marquez Williams	Fullback	7	240	Jacksonville Jaguars
