= Stacy Coley =

American football player (born 1994)

No. 13, 83, 3, 14
- Position: Wide receiver

Personal information
- Born: May 13, 1994 (age 32); Pompano Beach, Florida, U.S.
- Listed height: 6 ft 0 in (1.83 m)
- Listed weight: 195 lb (88 kg)

Career information
- High school: Northeast (Oakland Park, Florida)
- College: Miami (FL) (2013–2016)
- NFL draft: 2017: 7th round, 219th overall pick

Career history
- Minnesota Vikings (2017–2018); New York Giants (2018); New York Jets (2019)*; Dallas Renegades (2020)*; Tampa Bay Vipers (2020)*
- * Offseason or practice squad member only

Awards and highlights
- Second-team All-ACC (2015); 2× Third-team All-ACC (2013, 2016)

Career NFL statistics
- Games played: 7
- Return yards: 52
- Stats at Pro Football Reference

Stacy Coley (born May 13, 1994) is an American former professional football player who was a wide receiver in the National Football League (NFL). He played college football for the Miami Hurricanes from 2013 to 2016 and finished his career with the second-most receptions in school's history. Coley was selected by the Minnesota Vikings in the seventh round of the 2017 NFL draft.

== Early life ==
Coley attended Northeast High School in Oakland Park, Florida, where he starred as a wide receiver for ex-NFL running back and former Miami Hurricanes standout Donnell Bennett. As a senior in 2012, Coley led the Hurricanes to the first round of Class 7A playoffs, while catching 29 passes for 513 yards and 10 touchdowns. Coley finished his high school career as the top-rated wide receiver in the state of Florida. Coley played at the 2013 Under Armour All-America Game.

Coley committed to the University of Miami to play college football.

== College career ==
Coley played at Miami from 2013 to 2016. Coley ended his collegiate career ranked second in career receptions with 166, fifth in receiving yards with 2,218 and tied for fourth in receiving touchdowns with 20. He also ranked sixth in career all-purpose yards (3,810).his career with 166 receptions for 2,218 yards and 20 touchdowns. In his first two seasons, he returned 47 kickoffs for 1,142 yards and a touchdown and added 25 punt returns for 325 yards and a touchdown.

=== Freshman season ===
As a freshman, Coley played in all 13 games, making six starts at wide receiver, while also serving as the team's primary kick and punt returner. Led team with seven touchdown catches. In his collegiate debut against FAU on August 30, he caught two passes for 19 yards. In week 3 against Savannah State, he scored his first receiving touchdown and also returned a kick 88 yards to the end zone for his first kick return and last kick return touchdown. The following week, he totaled four receptions for a season-high 96 yards and two touchdowns against USF. In the Hurricanes' loss to Virginia Tech in week 9, Coley only caught one pass, but he took it 81 yards for a touchdown, making it his longest career reception. In the loss at Duke, Coley returned a punt 79 yards for a score in the first quarter. With that touchdown, Coley became the first Hurricane since Devin Hester back in 2004 to score punt and kick return touchdowns in the same year. Coley had a strong finish to his freshman season as he added five catches for 81 yards and score in the win over Virginia and tallied three first-half touchdowns in a road win at Pittsburgh, finishing with three catches for 72 yards and two receiving touchdowns as well as a 73-yard rushing touchdown late in the second quarter. Coley was the only player in the Football Bowl Subdivision to score a kickoff return touchdown, punt return touchdown, receiving touchdown and rushing touchdown. Among first-year players, Coley finished third in all-purpose yards with 114.3 per game and sixth in receiving yards with 591, 49 shy of surpassing Reggie Wayne for the second-most receiving yards by a Miami freshman. Coley was named a third-team All-Atlantic Coast Conference (ACC) selection by the coaches and a 247Sports true freshman All-American.

2013 season breakdown
			Receiving					Rushing				
Date	Opponent	Result	Rec	Yards	Avg	Long	TDs	Att	Yards	Avg	Long	TDs
8/30	Florida Atlantic	W 34–6	2	19	9.5	12	0	0	0	0.0	0	0
9/7	Florida	W 21–16	0	0	0.0	0	0	0	0	0.0	0	0
9/21	Savannah State	W 77–7	3	16	5.3	25	1	0	0	0.0	0	0
9/28	@South Florida	W 49–21	4	96	24.0	34	2	0	0	0.0	0	0
10/5	Georgia Tech	W 45–30	3	74	24.7	41	0	0	0	0.0	0	0
10/17	@North Carolina	W 27–23	3	21	7.0	11	0	0	0	0.0	0	0
10/26	Wake Forest	W 24–21	2	52	26.0	44	0	1	7	7.0	7	0
11/2	@Florida State	L 41–14	2	36	18.0	23	0	0	0	0.0	0	0
11/9	Virginia Tech	L 42–24	1	81	81.0	81	1	0	0	0.0	0	0
11/16	@Duke	L 48–30	2	10	5.0	5	0	0	0	0.0	0	0
11/23	Virginia	W 45–26	5	81	16.2	62	1	0	0	0.0	0	0
11/29	@Pittsburgh	W 41–31	3	73	24.3	34	2	1	73	73.0	73	1
12/28	Louisville	L 36–9	3	32	10.7	22	0	0	0	0.0	0	0
2013 totals			33	591	17.9	81	7	2	80	40.0	73	1

=== Sophomore season ===
Coley played in 12 games, including five starts at receiver as a sophomore. He served as the team's primary kick and punt returner for the second consecutive season. He totaled 184 receiving yards on 23 catches and ranked third on the team in all-purpose yards.

2014 season breakdown
			Receiving					Rushing				
Date	Opponent	Result	Rec	Yards	Avg	Long	TDs	Att	Yards	Avg	Long	TDs
9/1	@Louisville	L 31–3	3	9	3.0	5	0	1	−6	−6.0	0	0
9/6	Florida A&M	W 41–7	0	0	0.0	0	0	0	0	0.0	0	0
9/13	Arkansas State	W 41–20	0	0	0.0	0	0	0	0	0.0	0	0
9/20	@Nebraska	L 41–31	3	22	7.3	17	0	0	0	0.0	0	0
9/27	Duke	W 22–10	2	7	3.5	7	0	0	0	0.0	0	0
10/4	@Georgia Tech	L 28–17	1	2	2.0	2	0	0	0	0.0	0	0
10/11	Cincinnati	W 55–34	2	19	9.5	15	0	0	0	0.0	0	0
10/23	@Virginia Tech	W 30–6	1	13	13.0	13	0	1	2	2.0	2	0
11/1	North Carolina	W 47–20	0	0	0.0	0	0	1	10	10.0	10	0
11/15	Florida State	L 30–26	2	27	13.5	22	0	1	8	8.0	8	0
11/22	@Virginia	L 30–13	1	12	12.0	12	0	0	0	0.0	0	0
11/29	Pittsburgh	L 35–23	4	42	10.5	21	0	0	0	0.0	0	0
12/27	@South Carolina	L 24–21	4	31	7.8	13	0	1	16	16.0	16	0
2014 totals			23	184	8.0	22	0	5	30	6.0	16	0

=== Junior season ===
In his junior year, Coley looked to bounce back from the disappointment of his second season. He improved on most of his numbers in comparison to his sophomore season. In 11 games, Coley caught 47 receptions for 687 yards, with 4 of those receptions going for touchdowns. On October 10 against Florida State, in what was his best performance of the season, Coley caught seven passes for 139 yards, with a 19.3 yards per catch average, and scored a touchdown. Coley would finish first on the Hurricanes in receiving yards for the season with 689, sixth in the ACC in receiving yards per game, and tenth in the country in receptions per game (4.3). After the season, Coley was named an All-ACC third team member.

2015 season breakdown
			Receiving					Rushing				
Date	Opponent	Result	Rec	Yards	Avg	Long	TDs	Att	Yards	Avg	Long	TDs
9/5	Bethune-Cookman	W 45–0	2	11	5.5	13	0	0	0	0.0	0	0
9/11	@Florida Atlantic	W 44–20	0	0	0.0	0	0	0	0	0.0	0	0
9/19	Nebraska	W 36–33	0	0	0.0	0	0	0	0	0.0	0	0
10/1	@Cincinnati	L 34–23	0	0	0.0	0	0	0	0	0.0	0	0
10/10	@Florida State	L 29–24	7	139	19.9	31	1	0	0	0.0	0	0
10/17	Virginia Tech	W 30–20	4	63	15.8	28	0	1	15	15.0	15	0
10/24	Clemson	L 58–0	8	54	6.8	21	0	0	0	0.0	0	0
10/31	@Duke	W 30–27	5	87	17.4	32	1	0	0	0.0	0	0
11/7	Virginia	W 27–21	7	132	18.9	67	1	0	0	0.0	0	0
11/14	@North Carolina	L 59–21	5	58	11.6	34	0	0	0	0.0	0	0
11/21	Georgia Tech	W 38–21	3	56	18.7	42	0	0	0	0.0	0	0
11/27	@Pittsburgh	W 29–24	3	45	15.0	48	0	0	0	0.0	0	0
12/26	@Washington State	L 20–14	4	48	12.0	36	0	0	0	0.0	0	0
2015 totals			47	689	14.7	67	4	1	15	15.0	15	0

=== Senior season ===
Coley played in all 13 games in his final season, starting in 10 games. With a stat line of 63 receptions, 754 receiving yards, 9 touchdowns, and a yards per catch average of 11.97, Coley had his best season as a Hurricane. He remained the deep vertical threat used to stretch defensive coverages, but also became more of an intermediate option to pick up first downs. In the Hurricanes week 5 matchup against Florida State, Coley was on the receiving end on both of quarterback Brad Kaaya's touchdown passes and piled up 80 yards on seven catches. His second score brought the Hurricanes to within one point with 1:38 on the clock, but kicker Michael Badgley had his extra point blocked, ending the game 20–19 in favor of the Seminoles.

2016 season breakdown
			Receiving					Rushing				
Date	Opponent	Result	Rec	Yards	Avg	Long	TDs	Att	Yards	Avg	Long	TDs
9/3	Florida A&M	W 70–3	2	13	6.5	12	1	0	0	0.0	0	0
9/10	Florida Atlantic	W 38–10	4	38	9.5	13	0	0	0	0.0	0	0
9/17	@Appalachian State	W 45–10	5	85	17.0	55	2	0	0	0.0	0	0
10/1	@Georgia Tech	W 35–21	4	75	18.8	31	1	0	0	0.0	0	0
10/8	Florida State	L 20–19	7	80	11.4	21	2	0	0	0.0	0	0
10/15	North Carolina	L 20–13	2	12	6.0	6	0	0	0	0.0	0	0
10/20	@Virginia Tech	L 37–16	5	49	9.8	15	0	0	0	0.0	0	0
10/29	@Notre Dame	L 30–27	7	81	11.6	21	0	0	0	0.0	0	0
11/5	Pittsburgh	W 51–28	9	59	6.6	16	2	0	0	0.0	0	0
11/12	@Virginia	W 34–14	2	39	19.5	32	0	0	0	0.0	0	0
11/19	@NC State	W 27–13	2	54	27.0	51	0	0	0	0.0	0	0
11/26	Duke	W 40–21	9	118	13.1	42	1	0	0	0.0	0	0
12/28	West Virginia	W 31–14	5	52	10.2	30	0	0	0	0.0	0	0
2016 totals			63	754	12.0	55	9	0	0	0.0	0	0

=== Statistics ===
Year	Team	Receiving				Rushing				Kick return				Punt return			
Year	Team	Rec	Yards	Avg	TDs	Att	Yards	Avg	TDs	Ret	Yards	Avg	TDs	Ret	Yards	Avg	TDs
2013	Miami	33	591	17.9	7	2	80	40.0	1	22	570	25.9	1	10	220	22.0	1
2014	Miami	23	184	8.0	0	5	30	6.0	0	24	541	22.5	0	15	105	7.0	0
2015	Miami	47	689	14.7	4	1	15	15.0	0	1	31	31.0	0	0	0	0	0
2016	Miami	63	754	12.0	9	0	0	0.0	0	0	0	0.0	0	0	0	0	0
Career		166	2,218	13.4	20	8	125	15.6	1	47	1,142	24.3	1	25	325	13.0	1

== Professional career ==
=== Pre-draft ===
In May 2016, CBS Sports ranked Coley No. 5 among 2017 draft-eligible wide receivers. Soon after the Hurricanes secured a Russell Athletic Bowl victory, Coley began training for the NFL draft. After earning an invitation to the Senior Bowl, Coley later declined it. He instead focused on training for the NFL Scouting Combine. He had a good showing at the Combine, running the 12th-fastest time in the 40-yard dash among wide receivers, putting up 10 reps on the bench press, and jumping 34 inches in the vertical jump test. He re-tried the 40-yard dash at Miami's Pro Day, cutting down his time from 4.45 to 4.39 seconds.

External videos
- Coley performing at the NFL Combine
- Coley gets drafted by Minnesota

Pre-draft measurables
Height	Weight	Arm length	Hand span	40-yard dash	10-yard split	20-yard split	20-yard shuttle	Three-cone drill	Vertical jump	Broad jump	Bench press
5 ft 11 7/8 in (1.83 m)	195 lb (88 kg)	32 1/4 in (0.82 m)	9 3/4 in (0.25 m)	4.39 s	1.50 s	2.54 s	4.43 s	7.19 s	34 in (0.86 m)	10 ft 2 in (3.10 m)	10 reps
All values from NFL Combine except 40-yard dash and agility drills from Pro Day

=== Minnesota Vikings ===
Coley was selected by the Minnesota Vikings in the seventh round, 219th overall of the 2017 NFL draft. Coley became the 16th Miami alumn in Vikings history drafted by the Vikings and the second in 2017, as Minnesota used their second fifth-round pick (180th overall) to select Coley's college teammate, guard Danny Isidora. Isidora and Coley were the first Hurricanes to be drafted by Minnesota since the Vikings picked tackle Bryant McKinnie in 2002.

On September 18, 2018, Coley was waived by the Vikings.

=== New York Giants ===
On September 19, 2018, Coley was claimed off waivers by the New York Giants. He was placed on injured reserve on October 6, 2018, with a hamstring injury. He was released on October 16, 2018.

=== New York Jets ===
On January 5, 2019, Coley signed a reserve/future contract with the New York Jets. He was waived on May 10, 2019.

=== Dallas Renegades ===
Coley was selected by the Dallas Renegades of the XFL in the 4th round of the 2020 XFL draft.

=== Tampa Bay Vipers ===
Coley was traded to the Tampa Bay Vipers in exchange for wide receiver Freddie Martino on January 12, 2020. Coley was waived before the start of the regular season on February 6, 2020.
