= Mark Richt =

American football player and coach (born 1960)

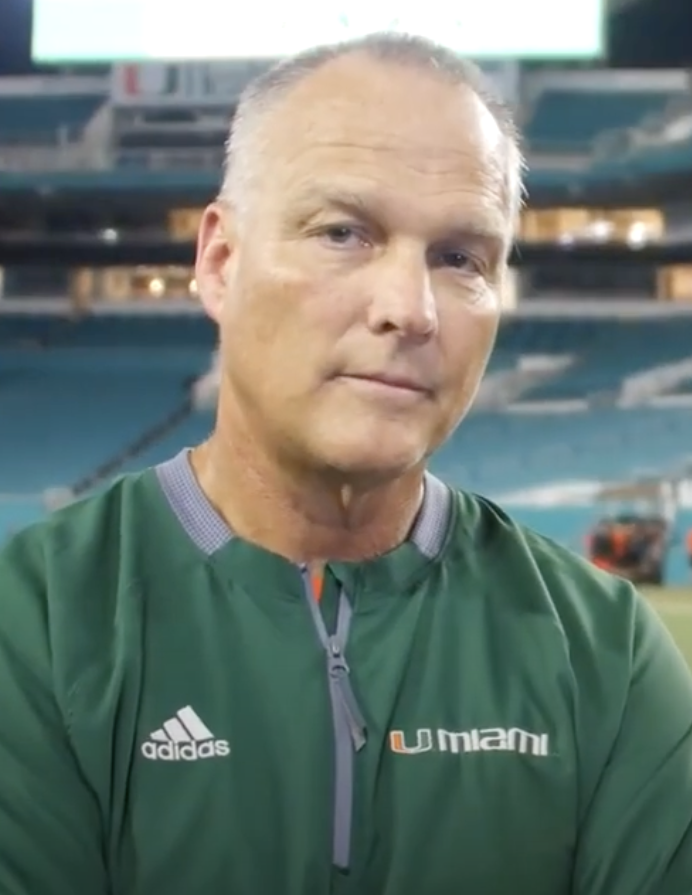
- Richt in 2018

Biographical details
- Born: February 18, 1960 (age 66); Omaha, Nebraska, U.S.

Playing career
- 1979–1982: Miami (FL)
- Position: Quarterback

Coaching career (HC unless noted)
- 1985–1988: Florida State (GA)
- 1989: East Carolina (OC)
- 1990–1993: Florida State (QB)
- 1994–2000: Florida State (OC/QB)
- 2001–2015: Georgia
- 2016–2018: Miami (FL)

Head coaching record
- Overall: 171–64
- Bowls: 10–7

Accomplishments and honors

Championships
- 2 SEC (2002, 2005); 5 SEC Eastern Division (2002–2003, 2005, 2011–2012); 1 ACC Coastal Division (2017)

Awards
- 2× SEC Coach of the Year (2002, 2005); ACC Coach of the Year (2017); Walter Camp Coach of the Year Award (2017)
- College Football Hall of Fame; Inducted in 2023 (profile)

Mark Allan Richt (born February 18, 1960) is an American former college football coach, player, and current television analyst. He was the head football coach at the University of Georgia for 15 years and at the University of Miami, his alma mater, for three. His teams won two Southeastern Conference (SEC) championships, five SEC division titles, and one Atlantic Coast Conference (ACC) division title. He was a two-time SEC Coach of the Year (2002, 2005), the 2017 ACC Coach of the Year, and the winner of the national 2017 Walter Camp Coach of the Year Award. On January 10, 2023, he was inducted into College Football Hall of Fame as part of the 2023 class.

Richt played college football as a quarterback at Miami. As an assistant coach, he spent 14 years at Florida State University, where he served as offensive coordinator and quarterbacks coach under Bobby Bowden, and a year as offensive coordinator at East Carolina University.

== Early years and playing career ==
Richt was raised in a blue-collar family, the second oldest of five children. He was born in Omaha, Nebraska to Lou and Helen Richt. Lou worked as a tool-and-die maker for Western Electric. In 1967, the Richt family moved to Boulder, Colorado when Lou got a new job. In 1973, Lou was transferred to South Florida where Mark would graduate from high school.

Richt became a star athlete at Boca Raton High and was called "All Turnpike" because of the various awards he received around the state of Florida. As a high school quarterback, he was recruited by the University of Miami, Florida State University, and Brown University. He chose to attend the University of Miami, an hour south from his family.

=== College and professional career ===
Richt played at the University of Miami from 1978 to 1982. Under coach Howard Schnellenberger, Richt was backup to future Pro Football Hall of Fame quarterback Jim Kelly. In later years at Miami, he played behind Bernie Kosar and Heisman Trophy winner Vinny Testaverde. He was mentored by quarterbacks coach Earl Morrall. Despite limited playing time, Richt still amassed nearly 1,500 passing yards. The 1981 Miami Hurricanes team finished 9–2, ranked 8th in the country, while the 1980 team finished 9–3, ranked 18th in the country. Richt received interest from multiple NFL teams and briefly spent time with the Denver Broncos behind John Elway.

== Assistant coaching career ==
=== Florida State (1985–1988) ===
Richt began his coaching career after being offered a job by Bobby Bowden as a graduate assistant for the Florida State Seminoles. Bowden had recruited Richt as a high school quarterback.

=== East Carolina (1989) ===
At the age of 29, Richt was hired as the offensive coordinator at East Carolina University. Richt was hired by Bill Lewis, who had previously been defensive coordinator at Georgia. Lewis hired Richt from Florida State in part to help with recruiting.

=== Florida State (1990–2000) ===
After one year at East Carolina, Bowden brought Richt back to Florida State to serve as the Seminoles' quarterbacks coach. Richt was promoted to offensive coordinator in 1994 upon the departure of Brad Scott. Under Richt, Florida State had one of college football's most explosive offenses. In his seven years as offensive coordinator, the Seminoles ranked in the nation's top five scoring offenses for five seasons, they were top twelve in total offense for five seasons, and top twelve in passing offense for five seasons. Richt coached two Heisman Trophy winning quarterbacks: Charlie Ward and Chris Weinke. Richt coached a total of five FSU quarterbacks to the NFL, including Weinke, Brad Johnson (Tampa Bay Buccaneers), Danny Kanell (New York Giants), Danny McManus (Kansas City Chiefs) and Peter Tom Willis (Chicago Bears). During this period, FSU won seven consecutive ACC titles and two national championships (1993 and 1999).

== Head coaching career ==
=== Georgia (2001–2015) ===
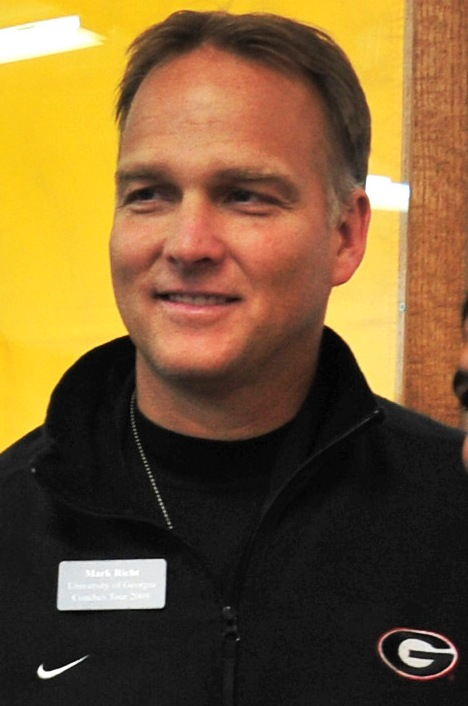
Richt in 2008

Richt was hired as head coach of the Georgia Bulldogs before the 2001 season, replacing Jim Donnan. Richt's teams won two Southeastern Conference (SEC) championships (2002 and 2005), six SEC Eastern Division titles (2002, 2003, 2005, 2007, 2011 and 2012), and nine bowl games. The 2002 season marked Georgia's first conference championship since 1982, and Georgia's first-ever outright SEC East Division championship and SEC Championship Game appearance since the league began divisional play and the championship game in 1992.

Richt's teams represented the SEC in three Bowl Championship Series bowl games (all in the Sugar Bowl), with a record of 2–1, and finished in the top ten of the final AP Poll seven times (2002–2005, 2007, 2012, 2014). Additionally, his 2008 team finished in the top ten of the coaches' poll but not the AP Poll.

Richt finished his career at Georgia with 145 wins and 51 losses, making him the second-winningest coach in Georgia history (after Vince Dooley's 201). He left with the highest winning percentage of any coach with more than 29 games at the school.

==== 2015 season and dismissal ====
The 2015 Georgia Bulldogs football team were the favorites to win the SEC Eastern Division. The Bulldogs started the season 4–0 with SEC wins over Vanderbilt by a score of 31–14 and South Carolina by a score of 52–20. On October 3, eventual national champion Alabama came to Athens and defeated the Bulldogs by a score of 38–10. Georgia then had two additional conference losses to Florida and Tennessee. Georgia finished the regular season 9–3 after a four-game winning streak, including road wins over Auburn by a score of 20–13 and Georgia Tech by a score of 13–7.

The day after the Georgia Tech game, Richt was dismissed after 15 seasons as head coach.

=== Miami (2015–2018) ===
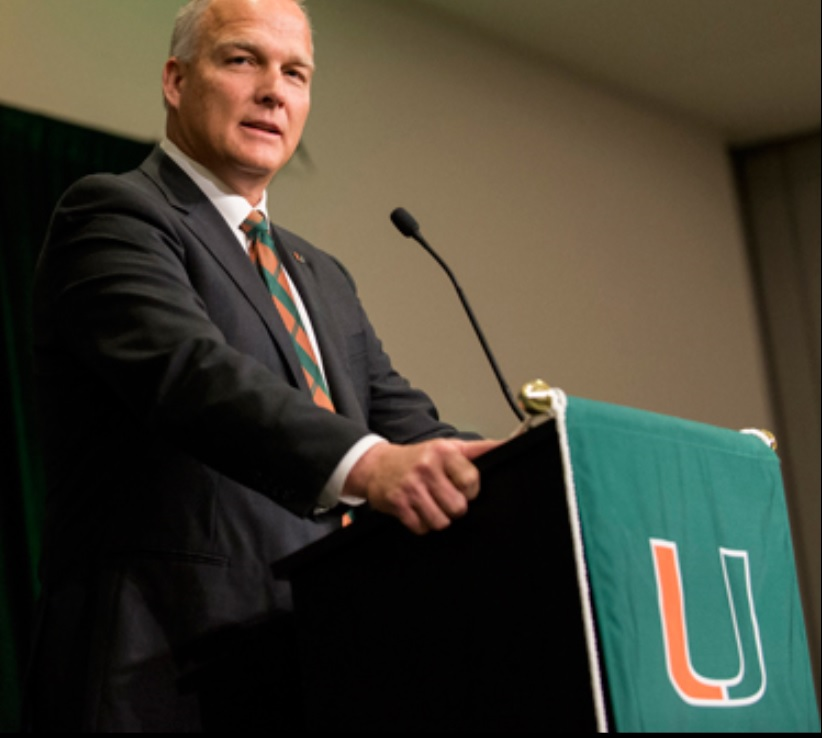
Richt at Miami.

After leaving Georgia, Richt was named the head coach of the Hurricanes of the University of Miami, his alma mater. Richt made the announcement on December 4, 2015. Instead of saying he was leaving his home in Georgia, he said he was coming home: "My wife and I can tell you this: This is our home. We love it." "I have no intention of doing anything but finishing my coaching career at Miami." Richt graduated from high school in Palm Beach County, an hour north of campus.

Fans embraced Richt's arrival in strong numbers. Before the opener of his first season, the Hurricanes surpassed 40,000 season ticket sales, the highest number since they started playing at Hard Rock Stadium in 2008. The Hurricane Club (UM Athletics's booster club) also sprung to a record level of members and donations.

Howard Schnellenberger called Richt's signing "a marriage made in heaven." Miami Heisman alumnus Vinny Testaverde noted "I know he's going to be a great role model for my boy, for our kids, he's going to be a great person and a great teacher...And that's what these kids need." "I was shocked that Georgia let him go. But their loss is Miami's gain." Testaverde's son Vincent was a backup quarterback on the team.

Richt served as the head coach of the Miami Hurricanes for the 2016 to 2018 seasons and called all offensive plays. He worked closely with quarterbacks at practice, alongside his oldest son and quarterbacks coach, Jon Richt. In his second year as head coach, he helped Miami win its first ACC Coastal title. Richt was named ACC Coach of the Year for this achievement.

==== Fundraising success ====
Shortly after joining Miami, Richt began spearheading a campaign to raise money for a new indoor practice facility. In May 2016, he told University of Miami boosters in Chicago he was donating $1 million of his own money towards the campaign, "I'm not just giving lip service to (making Miami great), that I truly believe it and I'm willing to invest my life in a lot of ways and our resources, too."

Four months later, athletic director Blake James announced the new $34 million practice facility would be slated to open in 2018. The practice facility includes an 80,000 square-foot indoor practice field as well as a 20,000 square-foot football operations center. The operations center will house coaches' offices on a mezzanine level, team meeting rooms, position meeting rooms and a recruiting suite, and have a direct connection to the Hurricanes weight room and locker room.

Upon the facility opening, Richt told ESPN "I didn't come here just because it was my alma mater. I came here because you can win. If you do things right and get the support you need, you can win. It's been proven. The players have always been here. You just have to make sure you get the right ones, and a lot of the other things they used to ding us on, our facilities and things like that, they're not going to be able to do that anymore with this brand-new building and the improvements to Hard Rock Stadium."

==== Community relations ====
Each Thursday during football season, Richt visited with local youth football teams. He has stated that he wanted to visit the teams at all the parks in Miami-Dade, Broward, and Palm Beach County. Richt also developed a partnership with the American Youth Football League to instruct youth coaches and players via regional clinics. The partnership further provided AYFL's coaches with a customized concussion protocol (in collaboration with UHealth Sports Medicine) that assists coaches with overall safety.

Tolbert Bain, a starter on the national champion 1987 team worked regularly with South Florida Youth leagues and helped Richt to develop the outreach. Richt told ESPN, "I'd do this either way, but in my view, it's also building for UM's future. I plan to finish my coaching career at Miami."

In Spring 2017, the team led all Division I FBS Football teams with the most community service hours.

==== "U" Network for University of Miami Football Alumni ====
In July 2016, Richt and his wife Katharyn announced they would launch 'The U Network'. "The U Network is going to be designed to help guys find work when their playing days are over whether it's right after college or after their pro days. My wife is going to be the person kind of facilitating everything—all of the paperwork and all of the things it will take to connect people with events and connecting players with employers. It's also going to be about reunion and connection, but the main goal is finding work for these guys and I'm talking about the guys who truly want work. We're not just going to give somebody something. They've got to do their part, but sometimes all they need is a little bit of help of guidance, connection, and networking."

"(Coach) Richt is asking players to commit three, four or five years, the most important years of their lives to him and this program," said Don Bailey Jr., Richt's former teammate. "In turn, he's committing to them to make sure their professional life is forever secure after football. I think it's the ultimate payback."

==== High school recruiting ====
Despite joining the program with less than eight weeks before signing day, ESPN praised Richt for managing to recruit the 18th best class in the country. During this period, Richt was limited to three weeks of NCAA-allotted face time with recruits. Within two years, Richt had assembled the #2 recruiting class in the nation and had more committed players (18) than any FBS program before the early signing day period.

Richt strongly opposes oversigning, a practice popular in the Southeastern Conference (SEC) that often results in older or hurt players losing their football scholarships. He believes that when a team offers a scholarship, it is a four-year commitment from the university. University of Miami athletes receive lifetime scholarships, allowing players who elect to leave before their graduation to return and complete their diploma.

In 2018, Richt told ESPN that due to the nature of trust in recruiting, he feels that it is unethical to pursue other jobs since the head coach is offering a long-term commitment to his players: "I never once have tried to leverage another job for more money. I don't think that's right. The day we took the job, my mentality has always been, 'If you're the head coach, too many lives depend on you.' If I just say on a whim, 'You know, I think I'd rather go here,' well, all these recruits you said something to, all these coaches you said something to, what about them? Every time you hire a coach, you're taking the coach, his wife and his kids on an adventure. They're trusting you and believing in you enough to become a staff member. I don't want to just walk into a room and say, 'Hey, guys, thanks for helping me get to where I really want to be.' It's the same thing with these kids. They've had enough disappointment, enough men leave their lives. You're trying to build trust, and then you bolt on them because of money or because of whatever? I've just never been able to get past that part of it."

===== Paradise Camp =====
Richt hosted "Paradise Camp", a summer football camp at UM for high school players. Prospects with offers and commitments were encouraged to attend. The camp was branded to highlight the benefits of playing and living in Miami's "paradise". The camp was open to individuals entering grades 9th -12th, prep students, junior college students, & 4 year college transfers. Miami charged the absolute allowable minimum for its on-campus camps. Richt regularly brought in UM NFL alumni as coaches:

- Ray Lewis
- Ed Reed
- Vince Wilfork
- Michael Irvin
- Warren Sapp
- Antrel Rolle
- Jeremy Shockey
- Calais Campbell
- Phillip Buchanon
- Gino Torretta
- Brett Romberg
- Najeh Davenport
- Duke Johnson
- Bennie Blades
- Brian Blades
- Kenny Phillips
- Devin Hester
- Bryant McKinnie
- Willis McGahee
- Jonathan Vilma
- Jon Beason
- DJ Williams

==== 2015–18 seasons ====
In Richt's first season at Miami, the team finished 9–4, including a victory over West Virginia in the 2016 Russell Athletic Bowl. The team finished #20 nationally in the AP College Football Poll.

In 2017, Richt received the Walter Camp Coach of the Year Award as the Hurricanes peaked nationally with a No. 2 ranking after 16 consecutive wins, clinching the ACC Coastal title.

Miami started off 1–0, before having to sit idle for three weeks because of Hurricane Irma. The game on September 9 against Arkansas State was cancelled and the Sep 16 rivalry match-up with Florida State was postponed until October 7. While campus was temporarily closed following the hurricane, the Hurricanes practiced at the ESPN Wide World of Sports Complex in Orlando, Florida. At the eventual Florida State rivalry game, the Hurricanes pulled off a last-minute score to win the contest and rose to #11 in the AP College Football Poll. The team went on to defeat No. 14 Virginia Tech and No. 3 Notre Dame which allowed them to secure the ACC Coastal title on November 11 despite two remaining conference games. Miami climbed to No. 2 in the CFP rankings before losing to Pitt and No. 1 Clemson in the ACC title game and ended the season losing to No.6 Wisconsin in the Orange Bowl.

Miami entered the 2018 season ranked eighth in the Preseason AP and Coaches Polls. However, the Hurricanes struggled throughout the year, including a four-game losing streak in October and early November, to end the regular season 7–5. The season ended with a 35–3 loss to Wisconsin in the Pinstripe Bowl.

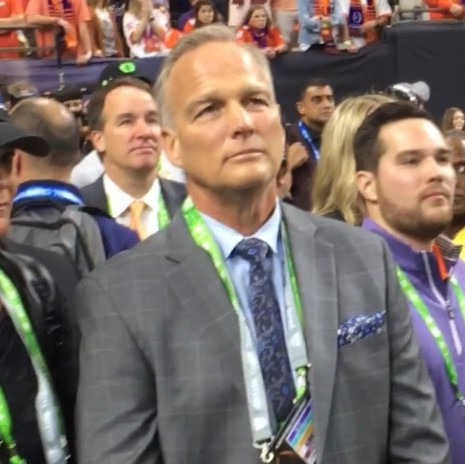
Richt at the 2020 CFP National Championship

== Retirement and television work ==
Through a statement released directly and through the University of Miami, Richt announced his retirement from coaching on December 30, 2018.

Starting with the 2019 season, Richt became a football analyst for the inaugural season of the ACC Network, a subscription-television channel that is owned and operated by ESPN Inc. and focuses on the Atlantic Coast Conference, where Richt coached for 3 seasons at Miami. (Note: Only the last nine years of Richt's career at Florida State were in the ACC; the school formerly competed as an independent. Additionally, Miami was not an ACC member at the time Richt played there, but had joined the conference by the time he became head coach.)

== Personal life ==
Richt is married to the former Katharyn Francis of Tallahassee, Florida. Katharyn graduated with an economics degree in 1987 from Florida State, where the couple met when she was an FSU cheerleader and Mark was a graduate assistant. Katharyn later earned a nursing degree in 2016. During Mark's tenure at Georgia, she began serving as "water girl" so she could spend time on the sidelines during games.

They have four children: Jonathan ("Jon") (born March 11, 1990), David (born December 1, 1994), and two children they adopted from Ukraine in 1999, Zach (born May 15, 1996), and Anya (born February 13, 1997, with a rare disorder known as proteus syndrome). Jon, like his father, was a college quarterback before becoming a coach. Jon coached at Georgia and in the NFL before serving as Mark's quarterbacks coach during his time with the Hurricanes.

ESPN's College GameDay featured a documentary on October 25, 2008, titled "GameDay looks at the Richt family's adoption of a young boy and girl from Ukraine" detailing the Richts' personal story of the adoption of Zach and Anya. The Richts declined on several occasions to publicly share their adoption story before deciding to proceed with the hope that it would encourage other families to explore its rewards.

Richt is a devout Christian and credits his conversion to a locker room speech given by Bobby Bowden when Richt was a 26-year-old graduate assistant. In 2011, the Richts sold their lake house in Georgia that was valued at nearly $2 million, announcing they intended to contribute more to charity. They have also taken several mission trips abroad.

During his tenure at Georgia, Richt's parents and sisters joined him in the Athens area. Richt's sister Nikki is married to former NFL quarterback Brad Johnson, Richt was Johnson's position coach when he played at FSU. His nephew Max Johnson started at quarterback for LSU in 2020, before later transferring to Texas A&M University. His nephew, Jake Johnson also played for Texas A&M. Both nephews transferred to the University of North Carolina in the spring of 2024.

When Richt became head coach at Miami, he and his wife purchased a house two miles from campus next to the Barnacle Historic State Park in Coconut Grove.

Richt appeared in the 2006 movie Facing the Giants as the former coach of the movie's main character, Grant Taylor.

On October 21, 2019, Richt tweeted that he had suffered a heart attack but had survived the episode and intended to resume normal activities quickly. On July 1, 2021, Richt announced via Twitter that he was diagnosed with Parkinson's disease.

== Head coaching record ==
Year	Team	Overall	Conference	Standing	Bowl/playoffs	Coaches^{#}	AP^{°}
Georgia Bulldogs (Southeastern Conference) (2001–2015)
2001	Georgia	8–4	5–3	T–3rd (Eastern)	L Music City	25	22
2002	Georgia	13–1	7–1	1st (Eastern)	W Sugar^{†}	3	3
2003	Georgia	11–3	6–2	T–1st (Eastern)	W Capital One	6	7
2004	Georgia	10–2	6–2	2nd (Eastern)	W Outback	6	7
2005	Georgia	10–3	6–2	1st (Eastern)	L Sugar^{†}	10	10
2006	Georgia	9–4	4–4	T–3rd (Eastern)	W Chick-fil-A		23
2007	Georgia	11–2	6–2	T–1st (Eastern)	W Sugar^{†}	3	2
2008	Georgia	10–3	6–2	2nd (Eastern)	W Capital One	10	13
2009	Georgia	8–5	4–4	T–2nd (Eastern)	W Independence		
2010	Georgia	6–7	3–5	T–3rd (Eastern)	L Liberty		
2011	Georgia	10–4	7–1	1st (Eastern)	L Outback	18	18
2012	Georgia	12–2	7–1	T–1st (Eastern)	W Capital One	4	5
2013	Georgia	8–5	5–3	3rd (Eastern)	L Gator		
2014	Georgia	10–3	6–2	2nd (Eastern)	W Belk	9	9
2015	Georgia	9–3	5–3	T–2nd (Eastern)	TaxSlayer (Note: Richt did not coach Georgia in the 2016 TaxSlayer Bowl because he had already accepted the head coaching position at Miami. The ranking reflects Georgia's ranking in the final regular season coaches poll.)	25	
Georgia:		145–51	83–37				
Miami Hurricanes (Atlantic Coast Conference) (2016–2018)
2016	Miami	9–4	5–3	T–2nd (Coastal)	W Russell Athletic	23	20
2017	Miami	10–3	7–1	1st (Coastal)	L Orange^{†}	13	13
2018	Miami	7–6	4–4	T–3rd (Coastal)	L Pinstripe		
Miami:		26–13	16–8				
Total:		171–64					
National championship Conference title Conference division title or championship game berth
^{†}Indicates BCS or CFP / New Years' Six bowl.; ^{#}Rankings from final Coaches Poll.; ^{°}Rankings from final AP Poll.
