= Wellington High School (Wellington, Florida) =

Coordinates: 26.6713889°N 80.2491667°W

Location
- 2101 Greenview Shores Blvd., Wellington, Florida, 33414

Information
- Type: High School
- Established: 1988
- Principal: Cara Hayden
- Staff: 141.50 (FTE)
- Grades: 9-12
- Age range: 14-18
- Enrollment: 2,760 (2023-2024)
- Student to teacher ratio: 19.51
- Colors: Blue & White
- Website: Wellington High School

Wellington High School is a public school located in Wellington, Florida, in central Palm Beach County.

== Curriculum ==
=== English ===
Four Credits of English are required. English 1 is offered all the way up to English 4, with the addition of AICE General Papers for 9th graders, AICE Language and Composition for 10th graders, AICE Literature and Composition AS Level for 11th graders and AICE Literature and Composition A Level for 12th graders. Dual Enrollment is now offered as well.

=== Social Studies ===
One credit of World History, one credit of U.S. History, 0.5 credits of Economics, and 0.5 credits of Government are required to graduate. Geography is optional during freshman year, World History is taken during sophomore year, U.S. History during junior year, and Economics and Government is taken during senior year, one semester each.

=== Math ===
Four Credits of Math are required to graduate. Algebra 1, Geometry, Algebra II, AICE Math, Math College Readiness, Pre-Calculus, Calculus, AP Calculus (AB and BC), Trigonometry, and AP Statistics are offered.

=== Science ===
Three Credits of Science are needed to graduate. Integrated Science (formerly known as Earth Sciences), Biology, Chemistry, Anatomy, Physics, Zoology, Marine Biology, Environmental Science, and the Veterinary Academy are all offered, and in the 2010–2011 school year, Forensic Science will be offered.

=== Foreign Languages ===
Foreign Language is required to graduate from high school. You need one foreign language credit to graduate, At least two credits are required for college acceptance. Spanish and French are both offered from Spanish and French 1 up to AP Spanish and French. American Sign Language is also offered. American Sign Language offers from ASL 1 to ASL 4.

=== Magnet Programs ===
The Veterinary, marketing, fine arts, and fire academy are offered as magnet programs at WHS. There are two science labs and a long distance communications lab

== Extra curricular programs ==
=== Debate ===
The debate team has had much success in regional and even national competition. Since 2002, Wellington has qualified 17 students to six National Forensic League national championship tournaments, including advanced rounds in Public Forum Debate and Congressional Debate.

=== Sports ===
The girls' lacrosse team won state championships in 2002 and 2004. The girls' soccer team were the state champions in the 2007–2008 school year. There are also a full complement of team sports, including football, soccer, tennis, swimming, bowling, basketball, baseball, track, volleyball, golf, and lacrosse.

=== Band ===
The Mighty Wolverine Sound Marching Band has over 150 participants.

Chorus

The Wellington High School chorus is directed by Bradford Chase. The choruses include Sirens, Kraken, Valkyries, and Chamber. Sirens is a treble SSA choir. Kraken is a changed voice (TB) choir. Valkyries is a treble SSAA choir. Chamber is a SATB mixed choir. Valkyries has continued to receive superior with distinction ratings from MPA adjudicators. In 2025, they performed at the FGCU music festival. Chamber has received many praises as well, most recently being their stunning performance at the FL ACDA 2025 conference. Even more, Wellington High choir members have continued to be accepted into honor choirs at the district, state, and national level.

== Notable alumni ==
- John Brebbia (Class of 2008), MLB pitcher for the San Francisco Giants
- Mark Brownson (Class of 1993), retired MLB pitcher
- Sean Burnett (Class of 2000), retired MLB pitcher
- Brooke Eden (Class of 2007), country music singer and songwriter.
- Trent Frazier (Class of 2017), Guard for the Illinois Fighting Illini
- Arin Hanson (Class of 2005; did not graduate), animator, internet personality, comedian, and musician
- Tyler Herron (Class of 2005), baseball player
- Cassadee Pope (Class of 2008), country music singer-songwriter
- Ahmmon Richards (Class of 2016), former Miami Hurricanes Wide-Receiver
- Vanessa Rousso (Class of 2001), professional poker player and cast member on Big Brother 17
- Nick Zano (Class of 1997), actor and producer
- Jerry Lorenzo (Class of 1995), fashion designer
