= 2016 Alamo Bowl =

2016 Alamo Bowl may refer to:

- 2016 Alamo Bowl (January)
- 2016 Alamo Bowl (December)
