= 2016 Oklahoma State Cowboys football team =

American college football season

2016 Oklahoma State Cowboys football

Alamo Bowl champion

Alamo Bowl, W 38–8 vs. Colorado
- Conference: Big 12 Conference

Ranking
- Coaches: No. 11
- AP: No. 11
- Record: 10–3 (7–2 Big 12)
- Head coach: Mike Gundy (12th season)
- Offensive coordinator: Mike Yurcich (4th season)
- Offensive scheme: Spread
- Defensive coordinator: Glenn Spencer (4th season)
- Base defense: 4–3
- Home stadium: Boone Pickens Stadium

2016 Big 12 Conference football standings
	Conf.			Overall
Team	W		L	W		L
No. 5 Oklahoma $	9	–	0	11	–	2
No. 11 Oklahoma State	7	–	2	10	–	3
No. 18 West Virginia	7	–	2	10	–	3
Kansas State	6	–	3	9	–	4
TCU	4	–	5	6	–	7
Baylor	3	–	6	7	–	6
Texas	3	–	6	5	–	7
Texas Tech	3	–	6	5	–	7
Iowa State	2	–	7	3	–	9
Kansas	1	–	8	2	–	10
$ – Conference champion; Rankings from AP Poll

The 2016 Oklahoma State Cowboys football team represented Oklahoma State University in the 2016 NCAA Division I FBS football season. The Cowboys were led by 12th-year head coach Mike Gundy and played their home games at Boone Pickens Stadium in Stillwater, Oklahoma. They competed as members of the Big 12 Conference.

== Schedule ==
Date	Time	Opponent	Rank	Site	TV	Result	Attendance
September 3	2:30 p.m.	Southeastern Louisiana*	No. 21	Boone Pickens Stadium; Stillwater, OK	FSN	W 61–7	50,079
September 10	11:00 a.m.	Central Michigan*	No. 22	Boone Pickens Stadium; Stillwater, OK	FS1	L 27–30	52,523
September 17	2:30 p.m.	Pittsburgh*		Boone Pickens Stadium; Stillwater, OK	ESPN	W 45–38	53,514
September 24	6:30 p.m.	at No. 16 Baylor		McLane Stadium; Waco, TX	FOX	L 24–35	45,373
October 1	11:00 a.m.	No. 22 Texas		Boone Pickens Stadium; Stillwater, OK	ABC	W 49–31	53,468
October 8	2:30 p.m.	Iowa State		Boone Pickens Stadium; Stillwater, OK	ESPNU	W 38–31	53,239
October 22	11:00 a.m.	at Kansas		Memorial Stadium; Lawrence, KS	FS1	W 44–20	26,262
October 29	11:00 a.m.	No. 10 West Virginia^{†}		Boone Pickens Stadium; Stillwater, OK	FOX	W 37–20	59,584
November 5	2:30 p.m.	at Kansas State	No. 18	Bill Snyder Family Football Stadium; Manhattan, KS	ABC/ESPN2	W 43–37	52,450
November 12	2:30 p.m.	Texas Tech	No. 13	Boone Pickens Stadium; Stillwater, OK	FS1	W 45–44	54,288
November 19	11:00 a.m.	at TCU	No. 11	Amon G. Carter Stadium; Fort Worth, TX	FS1	W 31–6	43,303
December 3	11:30 a.m.	at No. 9 Oklahoma	No. 10	Gaylord Family Oklahoma Memorial Stadium; Norman, OK (Bedlam Series)	FOX	L 20–38	87,527
December 29	8:00 p.m.	vs. No. 10 Colorado*	No. 12	Alamodome; San Antonio, TX (Alamo Bowl)	ESPN	W 38–8	59,815
*Non-conference game; ^{†}Homecoming; Rankings from AP Poll and CFP Rankings after November 1 released prior to game; All times are in Central time

Schedule source:

== Game summaries ==
=== Southeastern Louisiana ===
	1	2	3	4	Total
Lions	0	7	0	0	7
#21 Cowboys	28	3	21	9	61

=== Central Michigan ===
	1	2	3	4	Total
Chippewas	0	10	7	13	30
#22 Cowboys	14	3	3	7	27

=== Pittsburgh ===
	1	2	3	4	Total
Panthers	10	14	14	0	38
Cowboys	10	21	7	7	45

=== At Baylor ===
	1	2	3	4	Total
Cowboys	7	7	10	0	24
#16 Bears	7	14	7	7	35

=== Texas ===
	1	2	3	4	Total
#22 Longhorns	13	12	6	0	31
Cowboys	16	21	6	6	49

=== Iowa State ===
	1	2	3	4	Total
Cyclones	3	14	14	0	31
Cowboys	7	7	7	17	38

=== At Kansas ===
	1	2	3	4	Total
Cowboys	7	10	17	10	44
Jayhawks	7	6	7	0	20

=== West Virginia ===
	1	2	3	4	Total
#10 Mountaineers	3	7	0	10	20
Cowboys	6	14	7	10	37

=== At Kansas State ===
	1	2	3	4	Total
#22 Cowboys	7	14	7	15	43
Wildcats	13	3	14	7	37

=== Texas Tech ===
	1	2	3	4	Total
Red Raiders	7	21	7	9	44
#17 Cowboys	21	7	17	0	45

=== At TCU ===
	1	2	3	4	Total
#13 Cowboys	7	3	14	7	31
Horned Frogs	6	0	0	0	6

=== At Oklahoma ===
	1	2	3	4	Total
#11 Cowboys	3	14	3	0	20
#7 Sooners	0	17	14	7	38

=== Colorado–Alamo Bowl ===
	1	2	3	4	Total
#13 Cowboys	3	14	14	7	38
#11 Buffaloes	0	0	0	8	8

== Rankings ==
Ranking movements Legend: ██ Increase in ranking ██ Decrease in ranking — = Not ranked RV = Received votes
	Week															
Poll	Pre	1	2	3	4	5	6	7	8	9	10	11	12	13	14	Final
AP	21	22	RV	RV	—	RV	RV	RV	RV	22	17	13	10	11	13	11
Coaches	19	17	RV	RV	—	RV	RV	RV	RV	22	17	13	10	10	13	11
CFP	Not released									18	13	11	10	10	12	Not released
