= 2016 Baylor Bears football team =

American college football season

2016 Baylor Bears football

Cactus Bowl champion

Cactus Bowl, W 31–12 vs. Boise State
- Conference: Big 12 Conference
- Record: 7–6 (3–6 Big 12)
- Head coach: Jim Grobe (1st season)
- Offensive coordinator: Kendal Briles (2nd season)
- Offensive scheme: Veer and shoot
- Defensive coordinator: Phil Bennett (6th season)
- Base defense: 4–3
- Home stadium: McLane Stadium

2016 Big 12 Conference football standings
	Conf.			Overall
Team	W		L	W		L
No. 5 Oklahoma $	9	–	0	11	–	2
No. 11 Oklahoma State	7	–	2	10	–	3
No. 18 West Virginia	7	–	2	10	–	3
Kansas State	6	–	3	9	–	4
TCU	4	–	5	6	–	7
Baylor	3	–	6	7	–	6
Texas	3	–	6	5	–	7
Texas Tech	3	–	6	5	–	7
Iowa State	2	–	7	3	–	9
Kansas	1	–	8	2	–	10
$ – Conference champion; Rankings from AP Poll

The 2016 Baylor Bears football team represented Baylor University in the 2016 NCAA Division I FBS football season. The Bears were coached by first-year head coach Jim Grobe in their 118th football season. This was the team's third season in McLane Stadium in Waco, Texas. The Bears were members of the Big 12 Conference. They finished the season 7–6, 3–6 in Big 12 play to finish in a three-way tie for sixth place. They were invited to Cactus Bowl where they defeated Boise State.

The Baylor Bears football team drew an average home attendance of 45,838, slightly down from 46,160 in 2015, but still more than capacity.

== Recruiting ==
College recruiting
Name	Hometown	School	Height	Weight	40^{‡}	Commit date
Overall recruit ranking:
Note: In many cases, Scout, Rivals, 247Sports, On3, and ESPN may conflict in their listings of height and weight.; In these cases, the average was taken. ESPN grades are on a 100-point scale.; Sources: "2016 Team Ranking". Rivals.com.

National Signing Day was on February 3, 2016.

== Scandal ==
In September 2015, following the conviction of former players Sam Ukwuachu and Tevin Elliott of sexual assault, along with allegations against other players, the school commissioned law firm Pepper Hamilton LLP to conduct an independent external investigation regarding the university's handling of sexual violence. In April 2016, former player Shawn Oakman was arrested on sexual assault charges as well. Head coach Art Briles was terminated on May 26, 2016 following the presentation of Pepper Hamilton's report. University President Ken Starr and Athletic Director Ian McCaw also resigned. Former Wake Forest head coach Jim Grobe was hired on an interim basis.

Following the threat of a lawsuit by Briles for wrongful termination, Baylor provided an out of court settlement. Briles and Baylor are co-defendants in a lawsuit filed by a woman allegedly sexually assaulted by a football player. After Briles' departure, many players announced their intention to transfer including Jarrett Stidham. Seven members of the 2016 recruiting class requested to be released from their National Letter of Intent, and six of the then-seven commits in the 2017 recruiting class decommitted.

== Schedule ==
Date	Time	Opponent	Rank	Site	TV	Result	Attendance
September 2	6:30 p.m.	Northwestern State*	No. 23	McLane Stadium; Waco, Texas	FSN	W 55–7	44,849
September 10	2:30 p.m.	SMU*	No. 23	McLane Stadium; Waco, Texas	FS1	W 40–13	45,499
September 16	7:00 p.m.	at Rice*	No. 21	Rice Stadium; Houston, Texas	ESPN	W 38–10	27,047
September 24	6:30 p.m.	Oklahoma State	No. 16	McLane Stadium; Waco, Texas	FOX	W 35–24	45,373
October 1	11:00 a.m.	at Iowa State	No. 13	Jack Trice Stadium; Ames, Iowa	FS1	W 45–42	50,842
October 15	2:30 p.m.	Kansas^{†}	No. 11	McLane Stadium; Waco, Texas	FS1	W 49–7	47,598
October 29	2:30 p.m.	at Texas	No. 8	Darrell K Royal–Texas Memorial Stadium; Austin, Texas (rivalry)	ABC	L 34–35	97,822
November 5	2:30 p.m.	TCU	No. 17	McLane Stadium; Waco, Texas (rivalry)	FOX	L 22–62	48,129
November 12	11:00 a.m.	at No. 11 Oklahoma		Gaylord Family Oklahoma Memorial Stadium; Norman, Oklahoma	ABC/ESPN2	L 24–45	86,249
November 19	11:00 a.m.	Kansas State		McLane Stadium; Waco, Texas	ESPN2	L 21–42	43,581
November 25	5:00 p.m.	vs. Texas Tech		AT&T Stadium; Arlington, Texas (rivalry)	ESPN	L 35–54	41,656
December 3	2:30 p.m.	at No. 16 West Virginia		Mountaineer Field; Morgantown, West Virginia	FS1	L 21–24	49,229
December 27	9:15 p.m.	vs. Boise State*		Chase Field; Phoenix, Arizona (Cactus Bowl)	ESPN	W 31–12	33,328
*Non-conference game; ^{†}Homecoming; Rankings from AP Poll and CFP Rankings after November 1 released prior to game; All times are in Central time

Schedule source:

== Rankings ==
Ranking movements Legend: ██ Increase in ranking ██ Decrease in ranking — = Not ranked RV = Received votes т = Tied with team above or below
	Week															
Poll	Pre	1	2	3	4	5	6	7	8	9	10	11	12	13	14	Final
AP	23	23	21	16	13	13	11	9	8	13	25	—	—	—	—	—
Coaches	21	19	19	15	13	11	8	8	6–T	13	25	RV	—	—	—	—
CFP	Not released									17	—	—	—	—	—	Not released

== Game summaries ==
=== Northwestern State ===
	1	2	3	4	Total
Demons	0	0	7	0	7
#23 Bears	24	24	7	0	55

=== SMU ===
	1	2	3	4	Total
Mustangs	6	0	7	0	13
#23 Bears	0	6	20	14	40

=== At Rice ===
	1	2	3	4	Total
#21 Bears	0	21	10	7	38
Owls	0	10	0	0	10

=== Oklahoma State ===
	1	2	3	4	Total
Cowboys	7	7	10	0	24
#16 Bears	7	14	7	7	35

=== At Iowa State ===
	1	2	3	4	Total
#13 Bears	7	14	7	17	45
Cyclones	14	14	14	0	42

=== Kansas ===
	1	2	3	4	Total
Jayhawks	0	0	7	0	7
#11 Bears	21	21	7	0	49

=== At Texas ===
	1	2	3	4	Total
#8 Bears	14	7	10	3	34
Longhorns	14	9	3	9	35

=== TCU ===
	1	2	3	4	Total
Horned Frogs	10	28	10	14	62
#13 Bears	7	7	0	8	22

=== At Oklahoma ===
	1	2	3	4	Total
#25 Bears	0	10	7	7	24
#9 Sooners	14	7	14	10	45

=== Kansas State ===
	1	2	3	4	Total
Wildcats	0	7	21	14	42
Bears	0	14	0	7	21

=== Vs. Texas Tech ===
	1	2	3	4	Total
Bears	7	14	7	7	35
Red Raiders	20	21	10	3	54

=== At West Virginia ===
	1	2	3	4	Total
Bears	0	14	0	7	21
#14 Mountaineers	3	7	7	7	24

=== Boise State–Cactus Bowl ===
	1	2	3	4	Total
Broncos	0	6	0	6	12
Bears	7	14	3	7	31
