= 2016 Russell Athletic Bowl =

American college football game

- 27th Russell Athletic Bowl
West Virginia Mountaineers	Miami Hurricanes
(10–2)	(8–4)
Big 12	ACC
14	31
Head coach: Dana Holgorsen	Head coach: Mark Richt
AP / Coaches / CFP; 14 / 12 / 16
	1	2	3	4	Total
West Virginia	7	0	7	0	14
Miami	0	21	10	0	31
- Date: December 28, 2016
- Season: 2016
- Stadium: Camping World Stadium
- Location: Orlando, Florida
- MVP: Miami QB Brad Kaaya
- Favorite: Miami by 3
- Referee: Ken Williamson (SEC)
- Attendance: 48,625
- Payout: US$2,275,000

United States TV coverage
- Network: ESPN/ESPN Radio
- Announcers: TV: Dave Pasch, Greg McElroy, Tom Luginbill; Radio: David Neal, Matt Stinchcomb, Olivia Harlan

The 2016 Russell Athletic Bowl was a post-season American college football bowl game played on December 28, 2016 at the Camping World Stadium in Orlando, Florida. The 27th edition of the Russell Athletic Bowl featured the West Virginia Mountaineers of the Big 12 Conference against the Miami Hurricanes of the Atlantic Coast Conference. It was one of the 2016–17 bowl games that concluded the 2016 FBS football season. The game's naming rights sponsor is the Russell Athletic uniform company.

== Teams ==
The game featured tie-ins from the Atlantic Coast Conference and the Big 12 Conference.

== Game summary ==
=== Scoring summary ===
Scoring summary

Quarter	Time	Drive			Team	Scoring information	Score	
Quarter	Time	Plays	Yards	TOP	Team	Scoring information	WVU	UM
1	5:40	4	39	1:02	WVU	Kennedy McKoy 6-yard touchdown run, Mike Molina kick good	7	0
2	6:30	1	51	0:14	UM	Ahmmon Richards 51-yard touchdown reception from Brad Kaaya, Michael Badgley kick good	7	7
2	2:11	6	59	2:18	UM	Malcolm Lewis 3-yard touchdown reception from Kaaya, Badgley kick good	7	14
2	0:27	5	70	0:52	UM	Braxton Berrios 26-yard touchdown reception from Kaaya, Badgley kick good	7	21
3	11:04	8	75	3:56	UM	David Njoku 23-yard touchdown reception from Kaaya, Badgley kick good	7	28
3	7:50	9	75	3:14	WVU	Skyler Howard 4-yard touchdown run, Molina kick good	14	28
3	4:26	10	62	3:24	UM	30-yard field goal by Badgley	14	31
"TOP" = time of possession. For other American football terms, see Glossary of American football.							14	31
