= 2016 West Virginia Mountaineers football team =

American college football season

2016 West Virginia Mountaineers football

Russell Athletic Bowl, L 14–31 vs. Miami (FL)
- Conference: Big 12 Conference

Ranking
- Coaches: No. 17
- AP: No. 18
- Record: 10–3 (7–2 Big 12)
- Head coach: Dana Holgorsen (6th season)
- Offensive scheme: Spread
- Defensive coordinator: Tony Gibson (3rd season)
- Base defense: 3–3–5
- Home stadium: Mountaineer Field at Milan Puskar Stadium

2016 Big 12 Conference football standings
	Conf.			Overall
Team	W		L	W		L
No. 5 Oklahoma $	9	–	0	11	–	2
No. 11 Oklahoma State	7	–	2	10	–	3
No. 18 West Virginia	7	–	2	10	–	3
Kansas State	6	–	3	9	–	4
TCU	4	–	5	6	–	7
Baylor	3	–	6	7	–	6
Texas	3	–	6	5	–	7
Texas Tech	3	–	6	5	–	7
Iowa State	2	–	7	3	–	9
Kansas	1	–	8	2	–	10
$ – Conference champion; Rankings from AP Poll

The 2016 West Virginia Mountaineers football team represented West Virginia University in the 2016 NCAA Division I FBS football season. The Mountaineers played as members of the Big 12 Conference (Big 12) and were led by head coach Dana Holgorsen, in his sixth year. West Virginia played their home games at Mountaineer Field at Milan Puskar Stadium in Morgantown, West Virginia. 2016 was the 125th season of West Virginia football. They finished the season 10–3, 7–2 in Big 12 play to finish in a tie for second place. They received an invitation to the Russell Athletic Bowl, where they lost to Miami.

== Preseason ==
=== Big 12 media poll ===
The 2016 Big 12 media days were held from July 18–19, 2016 in Dallas, Texas. In the Big 12 preseason media poll, West Virginia was predicted to finish seventh in the standings.

Big 12 media poll
Predicted finish	Team	Votes (1st place)
1	Oklahoma	258 (24)
2	TCU	222 (2)
3	Oklahoma State	202
4	Baylor	156
5	Texas	151
6	Texas Tech	141
7	West Virginia	126
8	Kansas State	88
9	Iowa State	59
10	Kansas	27

== Schedule ==
West Virginia announced their 2016 football schedule on November 24, 2015. It consists of seven home, four away, and one neutral site game in the regular season. The Mountaineers hosted Big 12 foes Baylor, Kansas, Kansas State, Oklahoma, and TCU, and traveled to Iowa State, Oklahoma State, Texas, and Texas Tech.

The team played three non–conference games, two home games against the Missouri Tigers from the Southeastern Conference (SEC) and Youngstown State Penguins from the Missouri Valley Football Conference, and one neutral site game against the BYU Cougars at FedExField in Landover, Maryland.

Date	Time	Opponent	Rank	Site	TV	Result	Attendance
September 3	Noon	Missouri*		Mountaineer Field; Morgantown, WV (Gold Rush)	FS1	W 26–11	60,125
September 10	2:00 p.m.	No. 20 (FCS) Youngstown State*		Mountaineer Field; Morgantown, WV	RTPT	W 38–21	56,261
September 24	3:30 p.m.	vs. BYU*		FedExField; Landover, MD	ESPN2	W 35–32	38,207
October 1	3:30 p.m.	Kansas State^{†}		Mountaineer Field; Morgantown, WV (Stripe the Stadium)	ESPNU	W 17–16	61,701
October 15	Noon	at Texas Tech	No. 20	Jones AT&T Stadium; Lubbock, TX	FS1	W 48–17	54,111
October 22	3:30 p.m.	TCU	No. 12	Mountaineer Field; Morgantown, WV	ABC	W 34–10	61,780
October 29	Noon	at Oklahoma State	No. 10	Boone Pickens Stadium; Stillwater, OK	FOX	L 20–37	59,584
November 5	7:00 p.m.	Kansas	No. 20	Mountaineer Field; Morgantown, WV	ESPN2	W 48–21	56,343
November 12	Noon	at Texas	No. 16	Darrell K Royal–Texas Memorial Stadium; Austin, TX	FS1	W 24–20	96,367
November 19	8:00 p.m.	No. 9 Oklahoma	No. 14	Mountaineer Field; Morgantown, WV (True Blue)	ABC	L 28–56	57,645
November 26	3:30 p.m.	at Iowa State	No. 18	Jack Trice Stadium; Ames, IA	FS1	W 49–19	51,365
December 3	3:30 p.m.	Baylor	No. 16	Mountaineer Field; Morgantown, WV	FS1	W 24–21	49,229
December 28	5:30 p.m.	vs. Miami (FL)*	No. 16	Camping World Stadium; Orlando, FL (Russell Athletic Bowl)	ESPN	L 14–31	48,625
*Non-conference game; ^{†}Homecoming; Rankings from AP Poll and CFP Rankings after November 1 released prior to game; All times are in Eastern time

Schedule source:

== Game summaries ==
=== Missouri ===
	1	2	3	4	Total
Tigers	0	3	0	8	11
Mountaineers	10	3	10	3	26

=== Youngstown State ===
	1	2	3	4	Total
#20 (FCS) Penguins	0	14	0	7	21
Mountaineers	7	7	17	7	38

=== Vs. BYU ===
	1	2	3	4	Total
Cougars	7	6	6	13	32
Mountaineers	7	14	7	7	35

=== Kansas State ===
	1	2	3	4	Total
Wildcats	7	6	3	0	16
Mountaineers	0	0	3	14	17

=== At Texas Tech ===
	1	2	3	4	Total
#20 Mountaineers	10	14	3	21	48
Red Raiders	7	0	3	7	17

=== TCU ===
	1	2	3	4	Total
Horned Frogs	3	7	0	0	10
#12 Mountaineers	14	7	10	3	34

=== At Oklahoma State ===
	1	2	3	4	Total
#10 Mountaineers	3	7	0	10	20
Cowboys	6	14	7	10	37

=== Kansas ===
	1	2	3	4	Total
Jayhawks	0	0	14	7	21
#14 Mountaineers	10	21	14	3	48

=== At Texas ===
	1	2	3	4	Total
#11 Mountaineers	10	7	7	0	24
Longhorns	3	10	7	0	20

=== Oklahoma ===
	1	2	3	4	Total
#8 Sooners	21	13	7	15	56
#10 Mountaineers	0	7	7	14	28

=== At Iowa State ===
	1	2	3	4	Total
#19 Mountaineers	14	7	14	14	49
Cyclones	13	3	3	0	19

=== Baylor ===
	1	2	3	4	Total
Bears	0	14	0	7	21
#14 Mountaineers	3	7	7	7	24

=== Miami (FL) – Russell Athletic Bowl ===
	1	2	3	4	Total
#14 Mountaineers	7	0	7	0	14
Hurricanes	0	21	10	0	31

== Rankings ==
Ranking movements Legend: ██ Increase in ranking ██ Decrease in ranking — = Not ranked RV = Received votes
	Week															
Poll	Pre	1	2	3	4	5	6	7	8	9	10	11	12	13	14	Final
AP	—	RV	—	—	RV	22	20	12	10	14	11	10	19	14	14	18
Coaches	—	RV	RV	RV	RV	20	18	13	9	15	10	9	17	13	12	17
CFP	Not released									20	16	14	18	16	16	Not released
