= 2016 Alamo Bowl (December) =

2016 Valero Alamo Bowl
- 24th Alamo Bowl
| Oklahoma State Cowboys | Colorado Buffaloes |
| (9–3) | (10–3) |
| Big 12 | Pac-12 |
| 38 | 8 |
| Head coach: Mike Gundy | Head coach: Mike MacIntyre |
| AP / Coaches / CFP; 13 / 13 / 12 | AP / Coaches / CFP; 11 / 11 / 10 |
| | 1 | 2 | 3 | 4 | Total |
|---|---|---|---|---|---|
| Oklahoma State | 3 | 14 | 14 | 7 | 38 |
| Colorado | 0 | 0 | 0 | 8 | 8 |
- Date: December 29, 2016
- Season: 2016
- Stadium: Alamodome
- Location: San Antonio, Texas
- MVP: Offensive: James Washington (OKST); Defensive: Vincent Taylor (OKST)
- Favorite: Colorado by 3
- Referee: Jeff Heaser (ACC)
- Attendance: 59,815
- Payout: US$3,825,000

United States TV coverage
- Network: ESPN
- Announcers: TV: Adam Amin, Mack Brown, Molly McGrath; Radio: Bill Rosinski, David Norrie, Ian Fitzsimmons

The 2016 Alamo Bowl was a postseason college football bowl game, played on December 29, 2016 at the Alamodome in San Antonio, Texas. The game featured the Oklahoma State Cowboys, of the Big 12 Conference, and the Colorado Buffaloes, of the Pac-12 Conference. It was the two teams' first meeting since 2009 and the first since Colorado's departure from the Big 12 Conference in 2011. The game was the 24th edition of the Alamo Bowl and was sponsored by the San Antonio-based company, Valero Energy.

== Team selection ==
The Big 12 and Pac-12 has contractual tie-ins with the Alamo Bowl that afforded the bowl organizing committee the second pick of the conferences' bowl-eligible teams. A Big 12 team has participated in the game every year since the conference's founding in 1996. Previously, Oklahoma State played in the 1997, 2004, and December 2010 editions, and finished with a 1–2 record. Colorado participated in the 2002 edition as a representative as the Big 12, losing to the 2002 Wisconsin Badgers football team.

The Pac 12 and the Alamo Bowl began their partnership in 2010. The Pac 12 has since provided their second pick to the game.

== Series history ==
The Buffaloes and Cowboys first played each other in 1920, a 40–7 Colorado victory. The teams played each other annually from 1960–97, as members of the Big Eight Conference, and twice every four years in Big 12 competition. The Buffaloes heading into this contest held a 26–19–1 record over Oklahoma State. However, the Cowboys won the two previous matchups including a 31–28 victory over the Buffaloes in 2009.

== Game summary ==
=== Scoring summary ===
Scoring summary

| Quarter | Time | Drive | | | Team | Scoring information | Score | |
| Quarter | Time | Plays | Yards | TOP | Team | Scoring information | OKST | COLO |
|---|---|---|---|---|---|---|---|---|
| 1 | 10:17 | 10 | 64 | 4:43 | OKST | 28-yard field goal by Ben Grogan | 3 | 0 |
| 2 | 11:15 | 7 | 64 | 2:36 | OKST | Chris Carson 10-yard touchdown run, Ben Grogan kick good | 10 | 0 |
| 2 | 7:00 | 7 | 66 | 2:17 | OKST | James Washington 5-yard touchdown reception from Mason Rudolph, Ben Grogan kick good | 17 | 0 |
| 3 | 5:42 | 12 | 71 | 4:29 | OKST | Blake Jarwin 6-yard touchdown reception from Mason Rudolph, Ben Grogan kick good | 24 | 0 |
| 3 | 0:05 | 5 | 48 | 2:03 | OKST | Jhajuan Seales 23-yard touchdown reception from Mason Rudolph, Ben Grogan kick good | 31 | 0 |
| 4 | 5:28 | 9 | 77 | 2:38 | COLO | Sefo Liufau 6-yard touchdown run, 2-point pass (Liufau–Lindsay) good | 31 | 8 |
| 4 | 3:44 | 3 | 41 | 1:44 | OKST | Justice Hill 37-yard touchdown run, Ben Grogan kick good | 38 | 8 |
| "TOP" = time of possession. For other American football terms, see Glossary of American football. | | | | | | | 38 | 8 |

=== Statistics ===
| Statistics | OKST | COLO |
|---|---|---|
| First downs | 24 | 18 |
| Plays-yards | 74-527 | 67-318 |
| Third down efficiency | 7-14 | 6-16 |
| Rushes-yards | 41-189 | 29-62 |
| Passing yards | 338 | 256 |
| Passing, Comp-Att-Int | 23-33-0 | 22-38-1 |
| Time of Possession | 32:24 | 27:36 |

| Team | Category | Player | Statistics |
|---|---|---|---|
| OKST | Passing | Mason Rudolph | 22/32, 314 yds, 3 TD |
| OKST | Rushing | Justice Hill | 19 car, 100 yds, 1 TD |
| OKST | Receiving | James Washington | 9 rec, 171 yds, 1 TD |
| COLO | Passing | Sefo Liufau | 18/29, 195 yds |
| COLO | Rushing | Philli Lindsay | 14 car, 63 yds |
| COLO | Receiving | Philli Lindsay | 6 rec, 103 yds |
