= Advanced International Certificate of Education =

Educational qualification

The Advanced International Certificate of Education (AICE) is an internationally used English language curriculum offered to students in the higher levels of secondary school intended to prepare them for an honours programme during tertiary education. The curriculum is overseen by Cambridge International Examinations which is a branch of Cambridge Assessment and operates globally. It includes classes in the subject areas of mathematics and science; languages; and arts and humanities with two levels of difficulty: Advanced Subsidiary level and Advanced level, with Advanced level being more challenging. Students need to select subject from 4 different groups (Group 1: Mathematics and Sciences, Group 2: Languages, Group 3: Arts and Humanities, Group 4: Interdisciplinary and skills-based subjects (optional)).

Successful completion of the program within a 25-month period confers a Cambridge AICE Diploma. Three levels of diploma—Pass Level, with Merit and with Distinction—are offered based on the number of points that a student receives; these points depend upon factors such as the grade earned in an AICE class and the level of the class taken. To successfully complete the curriculum, a student must achieve at least 140 points with a minimum of seven credits in courses spread across the subject areas.

== Curriculum ==
Candidates for the AICE diploma must achieve at least seven different credits, with at least one coming from each of the groups except for Group 4, which is optional. A maximum of two credits from Group 4 may count towards a candidate's required seven credits. Also required for all candidates is the core subject AS Level Global Perspectives & Research, which may count towards one of the seven total credits required. AS Level courses count as one credit each, and A Level courses count as two credits each. Several subjects are available in multiple groups; they may only count towards only one of the groups listed as needed by the individual candidate.

=== Group 1: Mathematics and Sciences ===
- AS & A Level Biology
- AS & A Level Chemistry
- AS & A Level Computer Science
- AS & A Level Design and Technology
- AS Level Environmental Management (available in Group 1 or Group 3)
- AS & A Level Further Mathematics
- AS & A Level Information Technology
- AS & A Level Marine Science
- AS & A Level Mathematics
- AS & A Level Physical Education (available in Group 1 or Group 3)
- AS & A Level Physics
- AS & A Level Psychology (available in Group 1 or Group 3)

=== Group 2: Languages ===
- AS & A Level Arabic
- A Level Chinese
- AS Level Chinese Language
- A Level Chinese - Language & Literature
- AS & A Level English Language
- AS & A Level German
- A Level Hindi
- AS Level Hindi Language
- AS & A Level Japanese Language
- AS Level Language and Literature in English (available in Group 2 or Group 3)
- AS & A Level Portuguese
- AS Level Spanish (First Language)
- A Level Spanish
- AS Level Spanish Language
- AS Level Spanish Literature
- A Level Spanish - Language & Literature
- AS & A Level Tamil
- AS & A Level Urdu

=== Group 3: Arts and Humanities ===
- AS & A Level Accounting
- AS & A Level Art and Design
- AS & A Level Biblical Studies
- AS & A Level Business
- A Level Chinese - Language & Literature
- AS & A Level Classical Studies
- AS & A Level Design and Textiles
- AS & A Level Digital Media & Design
- AS & A Level Drama
- AS & A Level Economics
- AS Level Environmental Management (available in Group 1 or Group 3)
- AS & A Level Geography
- AS Level Hindi Literature
- AS & A Level Hinduism
- AS & A Level History (European, American or International)
- AS & A Level Islamic Studies
- AS Level Language and Literature in English (available in Group 2 or Group 3)
- AS & A Level Law
- AS & A Level Literature in English
- AS & A Level Media Studies
- AS & A Level Music
- AS & A Level Physical Education (available in Group 1 or Group 3)
- AS & A Level Psychology (available in Group 1 or Group 3)
- AS & A Level Sociology
- A Level Spanish - Language & Literature
- AS Level Spanish Literature
- AS & A Level Travel & Tourism

=== Group 4: Interdisciplinary Subjects ===
- AS Level English General Paper
- AS & A Level Thinking Skills
