= Marquez Williams =

American football player (born 1994)

No. 37, 42, 36
- Position: Fullback

Personal information
- Born: July 16, 1994 (age 32); Athens, Georgia, U.S.
- Listed height: 5 ft 10 in (1.78 m)
- Listed weight: 260 lb (118 kg)

Career information
- High school: Clarke Central (Athens)
- College: Miami (FL)
- NFL draft: 2017: 7th round, 240th overall pick

Career history
- Jacksonville Jaguars (2017); Cleveland Browns (2017); Atlantic City Blackjacks (2019); Houston Roughnecks (2020)
- Stats at Pro Football Reference

Marquez Williams (born July 16, 1994) is an American former professional football player who was a fullback in the National Football League (NFL). He played college football at Mars Hill University and the University of Miami. He was selected by the Jacksonville Jaguars in the seventh round of the 2017 NFL draft and later played for the Cleveland Browns.

== Professional career ==
=== Jacksonville Jaguars ===
Williams was selected by the Jacksonville Jaguars in the seventh round, 240th overall, in the 2017 NFL draft. The Jaguars previously obtained the pick by trading tight end Julius Thomas to the Miami Dolphins. On May 12, 2017, the Jaguars signed Williams to a four-year, $2.47 million contract with a signing bonus of $71,224. He was waived/injured on September 1, 2017 and placed on injured reserve. He was released on October 9, 2017.

=== Cleveland Browns ===
On December 23, 2017, Williams was signed to the practice squad of the Cleveland Browns. He was promoted to the active roster on December 29, 2017.

The Browns waived Williams on August 17, 2018 after failing to report to training camp.

=== Atlantic City Blackjacks ===
On April 2, 2019, Williams was assigned to the Atlantic City Blackjacks of the Arena Football League. He was placed on the physically unable to perform list on April 11, and placed on injured reserve on April 19, 2019.

=== Houston Roughnecks ===
In 2019, Williams was picked by the Houston Roughnecks of the XFL in the 2020 XFL draft. He was placed on injured reserve during final roster cuts on January 22, 2020. He was activated from injured reserve on February 12, 2020. He had his contract terminated when the league suspended operations on April 10, 2020.
