= Jon Richt =

American football coach

Current position
- Title: Head coach
- Team: Prince Avenue Christian School

Biographical details
- Born: March 11, 1990 (age 36)
- Education: Mars Hill College

Coaching career (HC unless noted)
- 2014: Georgia (Quality Control)
- 2015: Buffalo Bills (Offensive Assistant)
- 2016–2018: Miami (FL) (QB)
- 2021–2025: Prince Avenue Christian School (OC)
- 2025–: Prince Avenue Christian School

Jon Richt (born March 11, 1990) is an American football coach and former player. He was the quarterbacks coach for the University of Miami Hurricanes football team from 2016 to 2018, where he assisted his father, Miami head coach Mark Richt.

== Playing career ==
Jon Richt was a high school quarterback at Prince Avenue Christian School in Bogart, Georgia, near Athens, where his father coached at the University of Georgia. He began his college career at Clemson University, where he spent a redshirt year, then transferred to Mars Hill College (now University). At Mars Hill, Richt started every game as a senior, and set program records in completions, attempts, yards, and touchdown passes.

== Coaching career ==
=== Georgia ===
Richt spent the 2014 season serving on his father Mark Richt's Georgia Bulldogs coaching staff as a quality control assistant. During the 2014 campaign, Georgia posted a 10-3 overall record and went 6-2 in Southeastern Conference play, placing second in the East Division. The 2014 season was a record-breaking year for the Bulldogs’ offensive unit as Georgia posted 537 points and averaged 41.3 points per game - both of which were school records. Georgia’s 41.3 points per game ranked eighth in the NCAA.

=== Buffalo Bills ===
In 2015, Richt joined the NFL's Buffalo Bills as an entry-level assistant on new head coach Rex Ryan's first staff. During his lone season in Buffalo, the Bills posted an 8-8 record.

=== Miami ===
At the end of the 2015 season, Mark Richt was fired, or stepped down, as head football coach of the University of Georgia and later accepted the head football coaching job at the University of Miami. On January 2, 2016, Jon Richt joined his father's staff as quarterbacks coach, a position he held for his father's entire three-year tenure. Jon Richt was fired along with the entire Miami offensive coaching staff soon after Manny Diaz took over as head coach.

=== Youth coaching ===
Since 2019, Jon Richt has owned and has been a quarterback coach at Catalyst Quarterback Development in Buford, Georgia, in Metro Atlanta. He was offensive coordinator and strength and conditioning coach, then in 2025 he was made head coach, at his high school alma mater, Prince Avenue Christian School in Bogart, Georgia. While he was offensive coordinator, Prince Avenue won two state championships.
