= Danny Isidora =

American football player (born 1994)

No. 63, 65
- Position: Guard

Personal information
- Born: June 5, 1994 (age 32); Miami, Florida, U.S.
- Listed height: 6 ft 3 in (1.91 m)
- Listed weight: 306 lb (139 kg)

Career information
- High school: Cypress Bay (Weston, Florida)
- College: Miami (FL)
- NFL draft: 2017: 5th round, 180th overall pick

Career history
- Minnesota Vikings (2017–2018); Miami Dolphins (2019); Kansas City Chiefs (2020); Pittsburgh Steelers (2020); Houston Texans (2021)*; Atlanta Falcons (2021)*; Arizona Cardinals (2021–2022); Tennessee Titans (2022)*
- * Offseason or practice squad member only

Awards and highlights
- Second-team All-ACC (2016)

Career NFL statistics
- Games played: 31
- Games started: 6
- Stats at Pro Football Reference

Danny Isidora (born June 5, 1994) is an American former professional football player who was a guard in the National Football League (NFL). He played college football for the Miami Hurricanes. Isidora was selected by the Minnesota Vikings in the fifth round of the 2017 NFL draft. He was also a member of the Miami Dolphins, Kansas City Chiefs, Pittsburgh Steelers, Houston Texans, Atlanta Falcons, Arizona Cardinals and Tennessee Titans.

== Early life ==
A three-star recruit out of Cypress Bay High School, Isidora was regarded as the No. 13 offensive guard prospect and No. 39 overall prospect in the state of Florida according to ESPN. Isidora chose to attend Miami over Wisconsin and Florida State.

== College career ==
Isidora redshirted his first year on campus to get stronger and then missed the first 10 games of the 2013 season due to a foot injury. He earned the right-guard spot at the start of the 2014 season and did not relinquish it through the rest of his career. After the 2016 season, Isidora was one of three guards to be voted second-team All-Atlantic Coast Conference.

== Professional career ==
External videos
- Isidora performing at the NFL Combine

Pre-draft measurables
Height	Weight	Arm length	Hand span	40-yard dash	10-yard split	20-yard split	20-yard shuttle	Three-cone drill	Vertical jump	Broad jump	Bench press
6 ft 3 3/8 in (1.91 m)	306 lb (139 kg)	33 in (0.84 m)	9 7/8 in (0.25 m)	5.03 s	1.73 s	2.91 s	4.70 s	8.13 s	29 in (0.74 m)	8 ft 4 in (2.54 m)	26 reps
All values are from NFL Combine except broad jump and short shuttle from Pro Day

=== Minnesota Vikings ===
Isidora was selected by the Minnesota Vikings in the fifth round, 180th overall pick, in the 2017 NFL draft.

Isidora entered the 2018 season as a backup guard. He started two games at left guard in place of an injured Tom Compton.

=== Miami Dolphins ===
On August 30, 2019, Isidora was traded to the Miami Dolphins in exchange for a seventh round pick in the 2020 NFL draft. He was placed on injured reserve on September 25, 2019.

On September 5, 2020, Isidora was waived by the Dolphins.

=== Kansas City Chiefs ===
On September 8, 2020, Isidora was signed to the practice squad of the Kansas City Chiefs. He was elevated to the active roster on October 24 and 31 for the team's weeks 7 and 8 games against the Denver Broncos and New York Jets, and reverted to the practice squad after each game.

=== Pittsburgh Steelers ===
On December 15, 2020, the Pittsburgh Steelers signed Isidora off the Chiefs' practice squad.

=== Houston Texans ===
On July 31, 2021, Isidora signed with the Houston Texans. He was released on August 31, 2021.

=== Atlanta Falcons ===
On September 15, 2021, Isidora was signed to the Atlanta Falcons practice squad. Isidora was released on September 17, 2021.

=== Arizona Cardinals ===
Isidora signed with the Arizona Cardinals' practice squad on September 29, 2021. He signed a reserve/future contract with the Cardinals on January 19, 2022.

On August 30, 2022, Isidora was released by the Cardinals and signed to the practice squad the next day. He was released on November 2.

=== Tennessee Titans ===
On December 26, 2022, Isidora was signed to the Tennessee Titans' practice squad. On January 10, 2023, Isidora was released by the Titans.
