= 2016 NCAA Division I FBS football season =

American college football season

2016 NCAA Division I FBS season
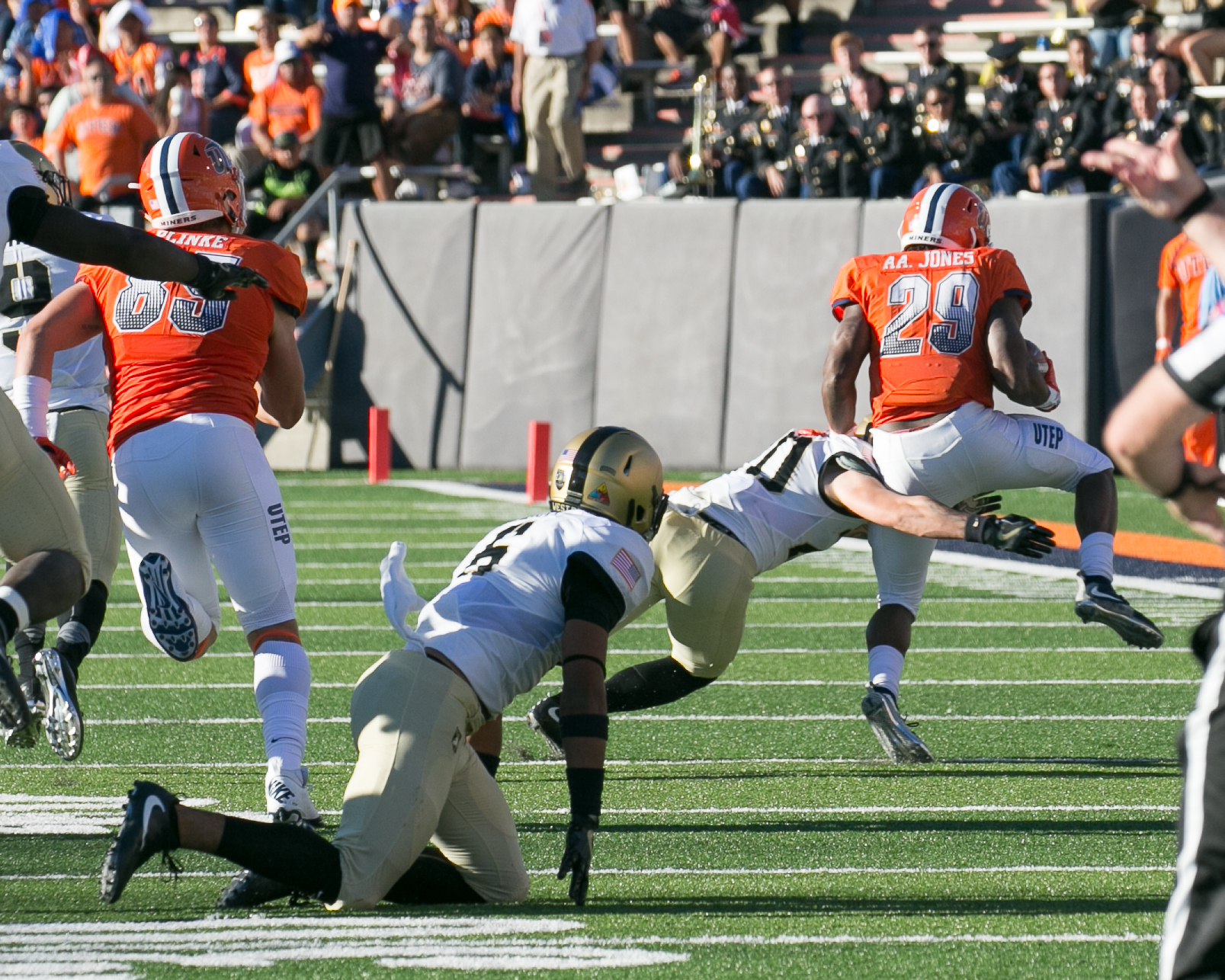
- The Army Black Knights defeats the UTEP Miners 66–14 on September 17 at the Sun Bowl.
- Number of teams: 128
- Duration: August 26, 2016 – December 10, 2016
- Preseason AP No. 1: Alabama

Postseason
- Duration: December 17, 2016 – January 9, 2017
- Bowl games: 41
- AP Poll No. 1: Clemson
- Coaches Poll No. 1: Clemson
- Heisman Trophy: Louisville quarterback Lamar Jackson

College Football Playoff
- 2017 College Football Playoff National Championship
- Site: Raymond James Stadium; Tampa, Florida
- Champion(s): Clemson

NCAA Division I FBS football seasons
- ← 2015 2017 →

The 2016 NCAA Division I FBS football season was the highest level of college football competition in the United States organized by the National Collegiate Athletic Association (NCAA). The regular season began on August 26, 2016, and ended on December 10, 2016. The postseason concluded on January 9, 2017, with the 2017 College Football Playoff National Championship, where the Clemson Tigers defeated the Alabama Crimson Tide to claim their second national title in school history. The championship game was a rematch of the 2016 edition won by Alabama.

== Rule changes ==
The following rule changes were voted on by the NCAA Football Rules Committee for the 2016 season:

- Requiring replay officials to review all aspects of targeting penalties, including the option to call a targeting foul missed by the on-field officials if the foul is deemed egregious. After several hits during the early part of the season that resulted in concussions that should have been targeting, the NCAA Rules Committee reinforced this rule for replay officials and also clarified the "crown of the helmet" (to determine targeting penalties) as the area above the facemask to the dome of the helmet.
- Allowing electronic devices to be used for coaching purposes in the press box and locker room during the game. Electronic devices will still be prohibited on the field and sideline.
- Coaches can now be ejected after receiving two unsportsmanlike conduct penalties in one game, the same as players.
- A ball carrier who "gives himself up" (e.g., by sliding) will now be considered a defenseless player.
- Deliberate tripping of a ball carrier with the leg is now a 15-yard penalty.
- Players who leave the tackle box are now prohibited from blocking below the waist toward the initial position of the ball.
- An exception to a rule introduced for the 2015 season regarding low hits to passers (i.e., at or below the knee) was eliminated. Previously, a defensive player would not have been penalized for such a hit if making a bona fide attempt at a tackle.
- Teams attempting a scrimmage kick (i.e., field goals, PATs, and punts) must have five offensive linemen (numbered 50–79) on the scrimmage line unless the kicking team has at least two players seven yards OR one player at least 10 yards behind the line of scrimmage. Previously, only one player had to be lined up seven yards behind the line to avoid using five linemen, causing confusion in kick coverage on defense.
- The procedure for restarting the game clock following a penalty by the offense will change if the penalized team has a lead in the last two minutes of either half. Before this season, the game clock would have been restarted in this situation once the ball was declared ready for play; it now will not start until the ball is snapped.

The committee, once again, took no action on changing the ineligible receiver downfield rule from three yards to one yard; however it will once again be a "point of emphasis" and will adjust officiating mechanics to better officiate those plays.

== Conference realignment ==
=== Membership changes ===
School	Former conference	New conference
UMass	MAC	FBS independent

Although Coastal Carolina began the transition process to FBS in the 2016 season and joined the Sun Belt Conference in non-football sports, it was officially classified as an FCS independent for this first season of the transition. Coastal Carolina became a provisional FBS member when the football team joined the Sun Belt in 2017, and full FBS membership and bowl eligibility followed in 2018.

== Other headlines ==
- March 1 – The Sun Belt Conference announced that its football-only membership agreements with Idaho and New Mexico State would not be renewed upon their expirations at the end of the 2017 season.
- March 3 - The NCAA Council forced the University of Louisiana at Lafayette and the Louisiana-Lafayette Ragin' Cajuns football team to vacate 22 wins from 2011-2014 including the 2011 and 2014 New Orleans Bowl championships after a finding that a previous assistant head coach had falsified ACT scores. Their penalty was the lowest penalty in NCAA Division I and the university did not receive a post-season ban.
- April 8 – The NCAA Division I Council voted to prohibit FBS schools from participating in or conducting so-called "satellite camps." The NCAA had already prohibited schools from hosting camps located more than 50 miles (80 km) from campus, but many coaches took advantage of a loophole that allowed them to participate in off-site camps as guest coaches. The new rule was reversed on April 28.
- April 11 – The Division I Council approved a three-year moratorium on new bowl games, following a season in which a record three teams with sub-.500 records made bowls. No new bowls were allowed until the 2019 season. This decision affected three games that were in the process of seeking NCAA certification for the 2016 season.
- April 28
  - The University of Idaho announced that the Vandals football team would return to the FCS Big Sky Conference, its all-sports league, effective with the 2018 season. The Vandals became the first team ever to voluntarily drop from FBS to FCS.
  - The Division I Board of Directors rescinded the FBS satellite camp ban that had been approved less than three weeks earlier. The ban had sparked major controversy within several conferences, notably the Pac-12 (whose Division I Council representative voted for the ban despite 11 of the league's 12 members opposing it). Additionally, the ban was seen as having the unintended effect of limiting scholarship opportunities, especially at Group of Five schools, for a large number of high school prospects.
- September 10 - Arizona State running back Kalen Ballage scored 8 touchdowns in the Sun Devils' 68–55 win over Texas Tech, tying an NCAA record set in 1990 by Howard Griffith of Illinois against Southern Illinois.
- October 22 – The Oklahoma–Texas Tech game, won 66–59 by Oklahoma, saw several FBS single-game records broken or equaled:
  - The teams combined for 1,708 yards of total offense (854 each), surpassing the previous FBS record of 1,640 set by San Jose State and Nevada in 2001.
  - Texas Tech quarterback Patrick Mahomes' 819 yards of total offense broke the previous FBS record of 751 set in 2014 by Connor Halliday of Washington State. Mahomes also tied Halliday's FBS record of 734 passing yards.
  - Oklahoma became the first FBS team ever with a 500-yard passer (Baker Mayfield), 200-yard rusher (Joe Mixon), and 200-yard receiver (Dede Westbrook) in a single game.
- November 9 – Georgia State University received final approval from the Georgia Board of Regents, the governing body of the state's university system, to purchase Turner Field, vacated by the Atlanta Braves after their 2016 season. The facility, originally the main stadium of the 1996 Olympics, was converted to a football stadium seating 23,000, with potential future expansion to 33,000. The football team ultimately began play at Turner Field, now known as Center Parc Stadium, in 2017 while the conversion project was ongoing.
- November 26 – Pittsburgh defeated Syracuse 76–61, with the two teams setting a new FBS record for combined points scored in a regulation game. The previous record had been set by Navy and North Texas in 2007.

== Kickoff games ==
- California and Hawaii played the first game of the 2016 season at ANZ Stadium in Sydney, Australia, on August 27. (Note: Due to time zone differences, the game took place on August 26 in the home time zones of both participating schools.) This was the first college football game in Oceania since 1985. California eased to a 51–31 win.
- Boston College and Georgia Tech played at Aviva Stadium in Dublin, Ireland, on September 3, in a game billed as the Aer Lingus College Football Classic. Georgia Tech scored a touchdown in the last minute to win 17–14.
- Wisconsin hosted LSU at the first-ever Division I FBS game at Lambeau Field in Green Bay, Wisconsin, also on September 3. The Badgers surprised the No. 5 Tigers 16–14. AP reporter Genaro Armas wrote that the loss, the first in a season opener for Les Miles in his 12 seasons at LSU, "will surely put Miles back on the hot seat after he was nearly run out of Baton Rouge after a 9–3 season in 2015."
- Houston met Oklahoma at NRG Stadium in Houston on September 3 in the Texas Kickoff, a game with major College Football Playoff significance as a virtual elimination game for Houston as a CFP contender. The Cougars are members of the "Group of Five" American Athletic Conference, but were coming off a convincing win over Florida State in last season's Peach Bowl. The game was also played against the backdrop of potential Big 12 Conference expansion, with Houston seen by many in the media as a leading Big 12 candidate. The Cougars won 33–23.
- North Carolina and Georgia played at the Georgia Dome in Atlanta, Georgia on September 3, in the annual Chick-fil-A Kickoff Game. Both teams entered the contest 0–1 in the Chick-fil-A Kickoff Game, with North Carolina losing to LSU in 2010 and Georgia falling to Boise State in 2011. In the debut for Georgia head coach Kirby Smart, the Bulldogs won 33–24, led by Nick Chubb, who ran for 222 yards and two touchdowns in his first game since tearing an ACL last season.
- USC and Alabama played at AT&T Stadium in Arlington, Texas on September 3 in the Advocare Classic. Defending national champions Alabama blasted the Trojans 52–6, marking USC's worst loss since a 51–0 blowout by Notre Dame in 1966.
- Arizona and BYU played week 1 of the season at University of Phoenix Stadium in Glendale, Arizona, on September 3 in the Cactus Kickoff. BYU won 18–16 on a field goal with 4 seconds left.
- Ole Miss and Florida State played at Camping World Stadium in Orlando, Florida, on September 5 in the Camping World Kickoff. Florida State, facing a 28–6 second-quarter deficit, scored 33 unanswered points and went on to win 45–34.
- Virginia Tech and Tennessee played at Bristol Motor Speedway near Bristol, Tennessee, on September 10 in a game billed as the Pilot Flying J Battle at Bristol. The game drew an announced crowd of 156,990, breaking the previous record for a college football game by more than 40,000. After trailing 14–0 at the end of the first quarter, Tennessee scored 31 unanswered points en route to a 45–24 win.

== Regular season top 10 matchups ==
Rankings reflect the AP Poll. Rankings for Week 10 and beyond will list College Football Playoff Rankings first and AP Poll second. Teams that fail to be a top 10 team for one poll or the other will be noted.

- Week 3
  - No. 10 Louisville defeated No. 2 Florida State 63–20 (Papa John's Cardinal Stadium, Louisville, Kentucky)
- Week 5
  - No. 10 Washington defeated No. 7 Stanford 44–6 (Husky Stadium, Seattle, Washington)
  - No. 5 Clemson defeated No. 3 Louisville 42–36 (Clemson Memorial Stadium, Clemson, South Carolina)
  - No. 4 Michigan defeated No. 8 Wisconsin 14–7 (Michigan Stadium, Ann Arbor, Michigan)
- Week 6
  - No. 8 Texas A&M defeated No. 9 Tennessee 45–38, 2OT (Kyle Field, College Station, Texas)
- Week 7
  - No. 1 Alabama defeated No. 9 Tennessee 49–10 (Neyland Stadium, Knoxville, Tennessee)
  - No. 2 Ohio State defeated No. 8 Wisconsin 30–23, OT (Camp Randall Stadium, Madison, Wisconsin)
- Week 8
  - No. 1 Alabama defeated No. 6 Texas A&M 33–14 (Bryant-Denny Stadium, Tuscaloosa, Alabama)
- Week 10
  - No. 6/6 Ohio State defeated No. 10/9 Nebraska 62–3 (Ohio Stadium, Columbus, Ohio)
- Week 12
  - No. 9/8 Oklahoma defeated No. 14/10 West Virginia 56–28 (Milan Puskar Stadium, Morgantown, West Virginia)
- Week 13
  - No. 2/2 Ohio State defeated No. 3/3 Michigan 30–27, 2OT (Ohio Stadium, Columbus, Ohio)
- Week 14
  - No. 4/4 Washington defeated No. 8/9 Colorado 41–10 (2016 Pac-12 Championship Game, Levi's Stadium, Santa Clara, California)
  - No. 7/8 Penn State defeated No. 6/6 Wisconsin 38–31 (2016 Big 10 Championship Game, Lucas Oil Stadium, Indianapolis, Indiana)

== Upsets ==
In the first full weekend of the season, seven teams ranked in the AP Poll lost, the most in an opening week since the debut of the AP preseason poll in 1950. The seven ranked losers included two top-five teams; the last time two such teams had lost in the season's first week was 1972. The weekend also saw seven SEC teams lose their season openers, which had not happened since the league returned to 12 teams with the 1992 arrival of Arkansas and South Carolina. (Note: The SEC was founded in 1932 with 13 members. The league operated with 12 members from the 1940 departure of Sewanee to the 1964 departure of Georgia Tech, and then with 11 members until Tulane left in 1966.) One of those loses saw South Alabama defeat Mississippi State 21–20 as a 28-point underdog, which was the biggest FPI upset in the last 5 seasons (2.3% chance to win before the match).

On September 10, a finish noted for its improbability happened when Central Michigan defeated Oklahoma State 30–27 on a Hail Mary pass followed by a lateral on the game's final play. Shortly afterwards, the game officials, as well as the conferences of the participating teams (the MAC and Big 12 respectively), announced that Central Michigan should not have been allowed to run the winning play. On the previous play, during which the clock had run out, Oklahoma State had been called for intentional grounding on fourth down. Under NCAA rules, a game cannot end on an accepted live ball foul; however, an exception to that rule states that if the penalty includes a loss of down—which is the case for intentional grounding—the game ends at that point.

On September 17, FCS program North Dakota State defeated No. 13 Iowa on a late field goal to win 23–21 at Kinnick Stadium, becoming just the fourth FCS team to beat an AP-ranked FBS team. This was Iowa's first loss to a non FBS opponent. The next day, NDSU received 74 points in the AP Poll to set a new record for votes received by an FCS team in a single AP Poll.

On October 22, unranked Penn State defeated No. 2 Ohio State, 24–21 at Beaver Stadium. Penn State had not been ranked since the 2011 season, and had entered the 2016 season still rebuilding after sanctions had decimated the roster in 2012. Ohio State built a 21–7 lead in the third quarter; Penn State rallied to score the game's final 17 points. Ohio State had lined up for a field goal to potentially put them ahead by seven points, but then-safety Marcus Allen blocked the field goal attempt, and Penn State's cornerback Grant Haley returned it 60 yards for the score. Haley's game-winning touchdown was labeled as the "Kick Six". It was Penn State's first win over a Top-5 team in 20 years; their first win against a top-2 opponent since 1990; and their first win in Beaver Stadium against a team ranked No. 2 since 1982 against No. 2 Nebraska. Penn State would go on to win nine straight games, winning the Big Ten Championship, rose to No. 5 in the College Football Playoff rankings, and went to the Rose Bowl. Ohio State did not lose again during the regular season, and despite their loss to Penn State, they would go on to the College Football Playoff.

On December 10, Army defeated No. 25 ranked Navy 21–17 to end a 14-year losing streak in the Army–Navy Game, the longest for either side in the rivalry's history.

== FCS team wins over FBS teams ==
Italics denotes FCS teams.

Date	Visiting team	Home team	Site	Result	Attendance	Ref.
September 2	Albany	Buffalo	University at Buffalo Stadium • Amherst, New York	22–16	18,657	
September 3	No. 14 (FCS) Eastern Washington	Washington State	Martin Stadium • Pullman, Washington	45–42	32,952	
September 3	No. 5 (FCS) Northern Iowa	Iowa State	Jack Trice Stadium • Ames, Iowa	25–20	60,629	
September 3	No. 4 (FCS) Richmond	Virginia	Scott Stadium • Charlottesville, Virginia	37–20	49,270	
September 10	Eastern Illinois	Miami (OH)	Yager Stadium • Oxford, Ohio	21–17	17,369	
September 10	No. 10 (FCS) Illinois State	Northwestern	Ryan Field • Evanston, Illinois	9–7	30,635	
September 10	No. 23 (FCS) North Carolina A&T	Kent State	Dix Stadium • Kent, Ohio	39–36 ^{4OT}	13,540	
September 17	No. 1 (FCS) North Dakota State	No. 13 Iowa	Kinnick Stadium • Iowa City, Iowa	23–21	70,585	
September 24	Central Arkansas	Arkansas State	Centennial Bank Stadium • Jonesboro, Arkansas	28–23	28,012	
September 24	No. 13 (FCS) Western Illinois	Northern Illinois	Huskie Stadium • DeKalb, Illinois	28–23	15,496	
^{#}Rankings from AP poll released prior to the game.

== Updated stadiums ==
- Miami (FL) debuted major renovations to the renamed Hard Rock Stadium. In a project that began after the Hurricanes and the stadium's owner, the Miami Dolphins, completed their 2014 seasons, a canopy was added over the main seating areas, video boards were placed in each corner, many luxury suites and club seats were added, and the stadium's lower bowl was reconstructed, eliminating an obsolete movable stand that had been added in the early 1990s to accommodate Major League Baseball's Florida (now Miami) Marlins. The capacity was reduced from over 75,000 to slightly over 65,000.
- Utah State made major renovations to Maverik Stadium, adding a new complex to the west side featuring expanded concourses, luxury suites, and a new press box.
- Oklahoma is currently undertaking a $160 million renovation of the south end zone of Gaylord Family Oklahoma Memorial Stadium. The renovation which will bowl in the end zone includes 22 enclosed suites, 60 loge boxes and nearly 2,000 club seats. The new end zone when completed will be topped by a new state of the art 7,806 square feet scoreboard. The official capacity increased to 83,489 (from 82,112).
- Ole Miss debuted phase 2 of the latest renovations and expansion of Vaught–Hemingway Stadium. The 2016 season saw the opening of new seating bowls in the north end zone, bringing capacity to 64,038.
- Florida State unveiled The Champions Club, a new club seat section constructed for Doak Campbell Stadium. The exclusive 6,000-seat club seat section, with more than 70,000 square feet of air conditioned club space and 34,000 square feet of covered rooftop terraces, was built in the south end zone across from the Unconquered Statue.
- Arizona State began a four-year renovation of Sun Devil Stadium after the 2014 season. For the 2016 season, upper deck seats were removed and the lower bowl on the west sideline and north end zone was redone. Renovations are expected to be complete by the start of the 2018 season.
- West Virginia was in the midst of approximately $50 million in renovations to Milan Puskar Stadium. For this season, the old turf and goalposts were replaced, and the crown under the field was removed and a modern base and drainage system installed that is more in keeping with today's infilled artificial turf systems. Also, work on the east and north side gates and concourses, including renovations to concessions, restrooms, and additional space for EMS and police operations, was completed for the 2016 season. Similar work on the west and south sides of the stadium is ongoing and expected to be completed for 2017.
- Louisville began work on expansion of Papa John's Cardinal Stadium during the season. The project will increase the stadium's capacity from 55,000 to 65,000, and at the time was planned to be complete for the 2019 season. Due to unexpected fundraising success, the project timetable was advanced, and the expansion is now expected to open for the 2018 season.

In addition to the stadium updates above, two schools played their final season in their then-current venues:

- Colorado State was in the process of replacing Hughes Stadium, owned by the university but located about 4 miles (6 km) west of the main campus, with a new on-campus venue tentatively known as Colorado State Stadium. The new stadium opened for the 2017 season.
- Georgia State played its final season in the Georgia Dome, as the stadium was to be demolished once its replacement, Mercedes-Benz Stadium, opened in September 2017. As noted above, Georgia State purchased Turner Field with the intent of renovating the stadium for football, and the Panthers began playing home games there in 2017 while renovations were ongoing.

== Conference standings ==
2016 American Athletic Conference football standings
	Conf.			Overall
Team	W		L	W		L
East Division
Temple xy$	7	–	1	10	–	4
No. 19 South Florida x	7	–	1	11	–	2
UCF	4	–	4	6	–	7
Cincinnati	1	–	7	4	–	8
UConn	1	–	7	3	–	9
East Carolina	1	–	7	3	–	9
West Division
Navy xy	7	–	1	9	–	5
Tulsa	6	–	2	10	–	3
Memphis	5	–	3	8	–	5
Houston	5	–	3	9	–	4
SMU	3	–	5	5	–	7
Tulane	1	–	7	4	–	8
Championship: Temple 34, Navy 10
$ – Conference champion; x – Division champion/co-champions; y – Championship game participant; Rankings from AP Poll

2016 Atlantic Coast Conference football standings
	Conf.			Overall
Team	W		L	W		L
Atlantic Division
No. 1 Clemson xy$#	7	–	1	14	–	1
No. 21 Louisville x	7	–	1	9	–	4
No. 8 Florida State	5	–	3	10	–	3
NC State	3	–	5	7	–	6
Wake Forest	3	–	5	7	–	6
Boston College	2	–	6	7	–	6
Syracuse	2	–	6	4	–	8
Coastal Division
No. 16 Virginia Tech xy	6	–	2	10	–	4
North Carolina	5	–	3	8	–	5
No. 20 Miami (FL)	5	–	3	9	–	4
Pittsburgh	5	–	3	8	–	5
Georgia Tech	4	–	4	9	–	4
Duke	1	–	7	4	–	8
Virginia	1	–	7	2	–	10
Championship: Clemson 42, Virginia Tech 35
# – College Football Playoff champion; $ – Conference champion; x – Division champion/co-champions; y – Championship game participant; Rankings from AP Poll

2016 Big Ten Conference football standings
	Conf.			Overall
Team	W		L	W		L
East Division
No. 7 Penn State xy$	8	–	1	11	–	3
No. 6 Ohio State x^	8	–	1	11	–	2
No. 10 Michigan	7	–	2	10	–	3
Indiana	4	–	5	6	–	7
Maryland	3	–	6	6	–	7
Michigan State	1	–	8	3	–	9
Rutgers	0	–	9	2	–	10
West Division
No. 9 Wisconsin xy	7	–	2	11	–	3
Iowa	6	–	3	8	–	5
Nebraska	6	–	3	9	–	4
Minnesota	5	–	4	9	–	4
Northwestern	5	–	4	7	–	6
Illinois	2	–	7	3	–	9
Purdue	1	–	8	3	–	9
Championship: Penn State 38, Wisconsin 31
^ – College Football Playoff participant; $ – Conference champion; x – Division champion/co-champions; y – Championship game participant; Rankings from AP Poll

2016 Big 12 Conference football standings
	Conf.			Overall
Team	W		L	W		L
No. 5 Oklahoma $	9	–	0	11	–	2
No. 11 Oklahoma State	7	–	2	10	–	3
No. 18 West Virginia	7	–	2	10	–	3
Kansas State	6	–	3	9	–	4
TCU	4	–	5	6	–	7
Baylor	3	–	6	7	–	6
Texas	3	–	6	5	–	7
Texas Tech	3	–	6	5	–	7
Iowa State	2	–	7	3	–	9
Kansas	1	–	8	2	–	10
$ – Conference champion; Rankings from AP Poll

2016 Conference USA football standings
	Conf.			Overall
Team	W		L	W		L
East Division
Western Kentucky xy$	7	–	1	11	–	3
Old Dominion x	7	–	1	10	–	3
Middle Tennessee	5	–	3	8	–	5
FIU	4	–	4	4	–	8
Charlotte	3	–	5	4	–	8
Marshall	2	–	6	3	–	9
Florida Atlantic	2	–	6	3	–	9
West Division
Louisiana Tech xy	6	–	2	9	–	5
UTSA	5	–	3	6	–	7
Southern Miss	4	–	4	7	–	6
North Texas	3	–	5	5	–	8
Rice	2	–	6	3	–	9
UTEP	2	–	6	4	–	8
Championship: Western Kentucky 58, Louisiana Tech 44
$ – Conference champion; x – Division champion/co-champions; y – Championship game participant; Rankings from AP Poll

2016 Mid-American Conference football standings
	Conf.			Overall
Team	W		L	W		L
East Division
Ohio xy	6	–	2	8	–	6
Miami (OH) x	6	–	2	6	–	7
Akron	3	–	5	5	–	7
Bowling Green	3	–	5	4	–	8
Kent State	2	–	6	3	–	9
Buffalo	1	–	7	2	–	10
West Division
No. 15 Western Michigan xy$	8	–	0	13	–	1
Toledo	6	–	2	9	–	4
Northern Illinois	5	–	3	5	–	7
Eastern Michigan	4	–	4	7	–	6
Central Michigan	3	–	5	6	–	7
Ball State	1	–	7	4	–	8
Championship: Western Michigan 29, Ohio 23
$ – Conference champion; x – Division champion/co-champions; y – Championship game participant; Rankings from AP Poll

2016 Mountain West Conference football standings
	Conf.			Overall
Team	W		L	W		L
Mountain Division
Wyoming xy	6	–	2	8	–	6
Boise State x	6	–	2	10	–	3
New Mexico x	6	–	2	9	–	4
Air Force	5	–	3	10	–	3
Colorado State	5	–	3	7	–	6
Utah State	1	–	7	3	–	9
West Division
No. 25 San Diego State xy$	6	–	2	11	–	3
Hawaii	4	–	4	7	–	7
Nevada	3	–	5	5	–	7
San Jose State	3	–	5	4	–	8
UNLV	3	–	5	4	–	8
Fresno State	0	–	8	1	–	11
Championship: San Diego State 27, Wyoming 24
$ – Conference champion; x – Division champion/co-champions; y – Championship game participant; Rankings from AP Poll

2016 Pac-12 Conference football standings
	Conf.			Overall
Team	W		L	W		L
North Division
No. 4 Washington xy$^	8	–	1	12	–	2
Washington State	7	–	2	8	–	5
No. 12 Stanford	6	–	3	10	–	3
California	3	–	6	5	–	7
Oregon State	3	–	6	4	–	8
Oregon	2	–	7	4	–	8
South Division
No. 17 Colorado xy	8	–	1	10	–	4
No. 3 USC	7	–	2	10	–	3
No. 23 Utah	5	–	4	9	–	4
Arizona State	2	–	7	5	–	7
UCLA	2	–	7	4	–	8
Arizona	1	–	8	3	–	9
Championship: Washington 41, Colorado 10
^ – College Football Playoff participant; $ – Conference champion; x – Division champion/co-champions; y – Championship game participant; Rankings from AP Poll

2016 Southeastern Conference football standings
	Conf.			Overall
Team	W		L	W		L
Eastern Division
No. 14 Florida x	6	–	2	9	–	4
No. 22 Tennessee	4	–	4	9	–	4
Georgia	4	–	4	8	–	5
Kentucky	4	–	4	7	–	6
South Carolina	3	–	5	6	–	7
Vanderbilt	3	–	5	6	–	7
Missouri*	2	–	6	4	–	8
Western Division
No. 2 Alabama x$^	8	–	0	14	–	1
No. 24 Auburn	5	–	3	8	–	5
No. 13 LSU	5	–	3	8	–	4
Texas A&M	4	–	4	8	–	5
Arkansas	3	–	5	7	–	6
Mississippi State	3	–	5	6	–	7
Ole Miss*	2	–	6	5	–	7
Championship: Alabama 54, Florida 16
^ – College Football Playoff participant; $ – Conference champion; x – Division champion/co-champions; * Ole Miss and Missouri vacated all wins due to NCAA violations.; Rankings from AP Poll

2016 Sun Belt Conference football standings
	Conf.			Overall
Team	W		L	W		L
Appalachian State +	7	–	1	10	–	3
Arkansas State +	7	–	1	8	–	5
Troy	6	–	2	10	–	3
Idaho	6	–	2	9	–	4
Louisiana–Lafayette	5	–	3	6	–	7
Georgia Southern	4	–	4	5	–	7
Louisiana–Monroe	3	–	5	4	–	8
South Alabama	2	–	6	6	–	7
Georgia State	2	–	6	3	–	9
New Mexico State	2	–	6	3	–	9
Texas State	0	–	8	2	–	10
+ – Conference co-champions

2016 NCAA Division I FBS independents football records
	Conf.			Overall
Team	W		L	W		L
BYU		–		9	–	4
Army		–		8	–	5
Notre Dame		–		4	–	8
UMass		–		2	–	10
Rankings from AP Poll

== Conference summaries ==
Rankings reflect the Week 15 AP Poll before the conference championship games were played.

=== Power 5 Conferences ===
Conference	Champion	Runner-up	Score	Offensive Player of the Year	Defensive Player of the Year	Coach of the Year
ACC	No. 3 Clemson ^{CFP}	No. 19 Virginia Tech	42–35	Lamar Jackson (QB), Louisville	DeMarcus Walker (LB), Florida State	Justin Fuente, Virginia Tech
Big 12	No. 7 Oklahoma	No. 11 Oklahoma State #14 West Virginia	N/A	Dede Westbrook (WR), Oklahoma	Jordan Willis (DE), Kansas State	Bob Stoops, Oklahoma
Big Ten	No. 8 Penn State	No. 6 Wisconsin	38–31	Saquon Barkley (RB), Penn State	Jabrill Peppers (LB), Michigan	Paul Chryst (coaches), Wisconsin & James Franklin (media), Penn State
Pac-12	No. 4 Washington ^{CFP}	No. 9 Colorado	41–10	Jake Browning (QB), Washington	Adoree' Jackson (WR/CB), USC	Mike MacIntyre, Colorado
SEC	No. 1 Alabama ^{CFP}	No. 15 Florida	54–16	Jalen Hurts (QB), Alabama	Jonathan Allen (DE), Alabama	Nick Saban, Alabama

=== Group of Five Conferences ===
Conference	Champion	Runner up	Score	Offensive Player of the Year	Defensive Player of the Year	Coach of the Year
AAC	Temple	No. 20 Navy	34–10	Quinton Flowers (QB), South Florida	Shaquem Griffin (LB), UCF	Ken Niumatalolo, Navy
C-USA	Western Kentucky	Louisiana Tech	58–44	Ryan Higgins (QB), Louisiana Tech (MVP); Carlos Henderson (WR), Louisiana Tech (Offensive POY)	Trey Hendrickson (DE), Florida Atlantic	Skip Holtz, Louisiana Tech
MAC	No. 13 Western Michigan	Ohio	29–23	Corey Davis (WR), Western Michigan	Tarell Basham (DE), Ohio	P. J. Fleck, Western Michigan
MW	San Diego State	Wyoming	27–24	Donnel Pumphrey (RB), San Diego State	Damontae Kazee (DB), San Diego State	Craig Bohl, Wyoming
Sun Belt	Appalachian State Arkansas State	Troy; Idaho	N/A	Jalin Moore (RB), Appalachian State	Ja'Von Rolland-Jones (DL), Arkansas State (overall POY); Rashad Dillard (DL), Troy (Defensive POY)	Paul Petrino, Idaho

^{CFP} College Football Playoff participant

== Postseason ==
=== Bowl selections ===
There were 40 postseason bowl games, with two teams advancing to a 41st – the CFP National Championship game. As in previous seasons, teams with losing records could become bowl-eligible in order to fill all 80 bowl slots.

==== Bowl-eligible teams ====
- American Athletic Conference (7): Houston, Memphis, Navy, Temple, Tulsa, UCF, USF
- Atlantic Coast Conference (11): Boston College, Clemson, Florida State, Georgia Tech, Louisville, Miami, N.C. State, North Carolina, Pittsburgh, Virginia Tech, Wake Forest
- Big 12 Conference (6): Baylor, Kansas State, Oklahoma, Oklahoma State, TCU, West Virginia
- Big Ten Conference (10): Indiana, Iowa, Maryland, Michigan, Minnesota, Nebraska, Northwestern, Ohio State, Penn State, Wisconsin
- Conference USA (7): Louisiana Tech, Middle Tennessee, Old Dominion, North Texas*, Southern Miss, UTSA, Western Kentucky
- Independents (2): Army, BYU
- Mid-American Conference (6): Central Michigan, Eastern Michigan, Miami (OH), Ohio, Toledo, Western Michigan
- Mountain West Conference (7): Air Force, Boise State, Colorado State, Hawaii*, New Mexico, San Diego State, Wyoming
- Pac-12 Conference (6): Colorado, Stanford, USC, Utah, Washington, Washington State
- Southeastern Conference (12): Alabama, Arkansas, Auburn, Florida, Georgia, Kentucky, LSU, Mississippi State*, South Carolina, Tennessee, Texas A&M, Vanderbilt
- Sun Belt Conference (6): Appalachian State, Arkansas State, Idaho, Louisiana-Lafayette, South Alabama, Troy

Teams with Asterisk(*) qualified for bowls based on Academic Progress Rate, despite not having a bowl-eligible record.

Number of bowl berths available: 80

Number of bowl-eligible teams: 80

==== Bowl-ineligible teams ====
- The American (5): SMU, Cincinnati, Connecticut, East Carolina, Tulane
- ACC (3): Duke, Syracuse, Virginia
- Big Ten (4): Illinois, Michigan State, Purdue, Rutgers
- Big 12 (4): Texas, Texas Tech, Iowa State, Kansas
- Conference USA (6): Charlotte, Florida Atlantic, Florida International, Marshall, Rice, UTEP
- Independent (2): Notre Dame, Massachusetts
- MAC (6): Akron, Northern Illinois, Ball State, Bowling Green, Buffalo, Kent State
- Mountain West (5): Nevada, Fresno State, San Jose State, Utah State, UNLV
- Pac-12 (6): Arizona State, California, Arizona, Oregon, Oregon State, UCLA
- SEC (2): Missouri, Ole Miss
- Sun Belt (5): Georgia Southern, Louisiana–Monroe, Georgia State, New Mexico State, Texas State

Number of bowl-ineligible teams: 48

=== Conference performance in bowl games ===
Conference	Total games	Wins	Losses	Pct.
ACC	12	9	3	.750
SEC	13	6	7	.462
C-USA	7	4	3	.571
MW	7	4	3	.571
Big 12	6	4	2	.667
Sun Belt	6	4	2	.667
Big Ten	10	3	7	.300
Pac-12	6	3	3	.500
The American	7	2	5	.286
Independents	2	2	0	1.000
MAC	6	0	6	.000

=== College Football Playoff ===
Since the 2014–15 postseason, six College Football Playoff (CFP) bowl games have hosted two semifinal playoff games on a rotating basis. For the 2016 season, the Fiesta Bowl and the Peach Bowl hosted the semifinal games, with the winners advancing to the 2017 College Football Playoff National Championship at Raymond James Stadium in Tampa, Florida.

Semifinals
December 31 – Peach Bowl Georgia Dome, Atlanta
1	Alabama	24
4	Washington	7
December 31 – Fiesta Bowl University of Phoenix Stadium, Glendale
2	Clemson	31
3	Ohio State	0

Championship
January 9 – Championship Raymond James Stadium, Tampa
1	Alabama	31
2	Clemson	35

== Rankings ==
=== Final CFP rankings ===
CFP	School	Record	Bowl game
1	Alabama	13–0	Peach Bowl (CFP Semifinal)
2	Clemson	12–1	Fiesta Bowl (CFP Semifinal)
3	Ohio State	11–1	Fiesta Bowl (CFP Semifinal)
4	Washington	12–1	Peach Bowl (CFP Semifinal)
5	Penn State	11–2	Rose Bowl
6	Michigan	10–2	Orange Bowl
7	Oklahoma	10–2	Sugar Bowl
8	Wisconsin	10–3	Cotton Bowl Classic
9	USC	9–3	Rose Bowl
10	Colorado	10–3	Alamo Bowl
11	Florida State	9–3	Orange Bowl
12	Oklahoma State	9–3	Alamo Bowl
13	Louisville	9–3	Citrus Bowl
14	Auburn	8–4	Sugar Bowl
15	Western Michigan	13–0	Cotton Bowl Classic
16	West Virginia	10–2	Russell Athletic Bowl
17	Florida	8–4	Outback Bowl
18	Stanford	9–3	Sun Bowl
19	Utah	8–4	Foster Farms Bowl
20	LSU	7–4	Citrus Bowl
21	Tennessee	8–4	Music City Bowl
22	Virginia Tech	9–4	Belk Bowl
23	Pittsburgh	8–4	Pinstripe Bowl
24	Temple	10–3	Military Bowl
25	Navy	9–3	Armed Forces Bowl

=== Final rankings ===
Rank	Associated Press	Coaches' Poll
1	Clemson	Clemson
2	Alabama	Alabama
3	USC	Oklahoma
4	Washington	Washington
5	Oklahoma	USC
6	Ohio State	Ohio State
7	Penn State	Penn State
8	Florida State	Florida State
9	Wisconsin	Wisconsin
10	Michigan	Michigan
11	Oklahoma State	Oklahoma State
12	Stanford	Stanford
13	LSU	Florida
14	Florida	LSU
15	Western Michigan	Colorado
16	Virginia Tech	Virginia Tech
17	Colorado	West Virginia
18	West Virginia	Western Michigan
19	USF	USF
20	Miami (FL)	Louisville
21	Louisville	Utah
22	Tennessee	Auburn
23	Utah	Miami (FL)
24	Auburn	Tennessee
25	San Diego State	San Diego State

== Awards and honors ==
=== Heisman Trophy voting ===
The Heisman Trophy is given to the year's most outstanding player

Player	School	Position	1st	2nd	3rd	Total
Lamar Jackson	Louisville	QB	526	251	64	2,144
Deshaun Watson	Clemson	QB	269	302	113	1,524
Baker Mayfield	Oklahoma	QB	26	72	139	361
Dede Westbrook	Oklahoma	WR	7	49	90	209
Jabrill Peppers	Michigan	LB	11	45	85	208
Jake Browning	Washington	QB	3	41	91	182
Jonathan Allen	Alabama	DE	17	21	39	132
D'Onta Foreman	Texas	RB	6	21	17	131
Christian McCaffrey	Stanford	RB	10	17	39	103
Dalvin Cook	Florida State	RB	3	15	28	67
Donnel Pumphrey	San Diego State	RB	4	12	31	67

=== Other overall ===
- Archie Griffin Award (MVP): Sam Darnold, USC
- AP Player of the Year: Lamar Jackson, Louisville
- Chic Harley Award (Player of the Year): Deshaun Watson, Clemson
- Maxwell Award (top player): Lamar Jackson, Louisville
- SN Player of the Year: Lamar Jackson, Louisville
- Walter Camp Award (top player): Lamar Jackson, Louisville

=== Special overall ===
- Burlsworth Trophy (top player who began as walk-on): Baker Mayfield, Oklahoma
- Paul Hornung Award (most versatile player): Jabrill Peppers, Michigan
- Campbell Trophy ("academic Heisman"): Zach Terrell, Western Michigan
- Wuerffel Trophy (humanitarian-athlete): Trevor Knight, Texas A&M
- POLY POY (Polynesian College Football Player of the Year): Sefo Liufau, Colorado

=== Offense ===
Quarterback

- Davey O'Brien Award (quarterback): Deshaun Watson, Clemson
- Johnny Unitas Award (senior/4th year quarterback): Deshaun Watson, Clemson
- Kellen Moore Award (quarterback): Baker Mayfield, Oklahoma
- Manning Award (quarterback): Deshaun Watson, Clemson
- Sammy Baugh Trophy (passing quarterback): Patrick Mahomes II, Texas Tech

Running back

- Doak Walker Award (running back): D'Onta Foreman, Texas
- Jim Brown Trophy (running back): Donnel Pumphrey, San Diego State

Receiver

- Fred Biletnikoff Award (outstanding receiver at any position): Dede Westbrook, Oklahoma
- Paul Warfield Trophy (wide receiver): Finalists: Corey Davis, Western Michigan

Tight end

- John Mackey Award (tight end): Jake Butt, Michigan
- Ozzie Newsome Award (tight end): Evan Engram, Ole Miss

Lineman

- Dave Rimington Trophy (center): Pat Elflein, Ohio State
- Jim Parker Trophy (offensive lineman): Pat Elflein, Ohio State
- Joe Moore Award (offensive line): Iowa

=== Defense ===
- Bronko Nagurski Trophy (defensive player): Jonathan Allen, Alabama
- Chuck Bednarik Award (defensive player): Jonathan Allen, Alabama
- Lott Trophy (defensive impact): Jabrill Peppers, Michigan

Defensive line

- Bill Willis Award (defensive lineman): Ed Oliver, Houston
- Dick Butkus Award (linebacker): Reuben Foster, Alabama
- Jack Lambert Trophy (linebacker): Ben Boulware, Clemson
- Lombardi Award (defensive lineman/linebacker): Jonathan Allen, Alabama
- Ted Hendricks Award (defensive end): Jonathan Allen, Alabama

Defensive back

- Jim Thorpe Award (defensive back): Adoree' Jackson, USC
- Jack Tatum Trophy (defensive back): Tarvarus McFadden, Florida State

=== Special teams ===
- Lou Groza Award (placekicker): Zane Gonzalez, Arizona State
- Vlade Award (placekicker): Tyler Davis, Penn State
- Ray Guy Award (punter): Mitch Wishnowsky, Utah
- Jet Award (return specialist): Adoree' Jackson, USC
- Peter Mortell Award (holder): Garrett Moores, Michigan

=== Other positional awards ===
- Outland Trophy (interior lineman on either offense or defense): Cam Robinson, Alabama

=== Coaches ===
- AFCA Coach of the Year: Mike MacIntyre, Colorado
- AP Coach of the Year: Mike MacIntyre, Colorado

==== Assistants ====
- AFCA Assistant Coach of the Year: Dan Brooks, Clemson
- Broyles Award: Brent Venables, Clemson

== Coaching changes ==
=== Preseason and in-season ===
This is restricted to coaching changes taking place on or after May 1, 2016. For coaching changes that occurred earlier in 2016, see 2015 NCAA Division I FBS end-of-season coaching changes.

Team	Outgoing coach	Date	Reason	Replacement
Baylor	Art Briles	May 26, 2016	Fired	Jim Grobe (interim, bowl)
FIU	Ron Turner	September 25, 2016	Fired	Ron Cooper (interim)
FIU	Ron Cooper (interim)	November 9, 2016	Permanent replacement	Butch Davis
Fresno State	Tim DeRuyter	October 23, 2016	Fired	Eric Kiesau (interim)
Fresno State	Eric Kiesau (interim)	November 9, 2016	Permanent replacement	Jeff Tedford
Georgia State	Trent Miles	November 13, 2016	Fired	Tim Lappano (interim)
Houston	Tom Herman	November 26, 2016	Hired by Texas	Todd Orlando (interim) Bowl
LSU	Les Miles	September 25, 2016	Fired	Ed Orgeron (Note: Interim for remainder of season; named permanent replacement on November 26, 2016.)
Purdue	Darrell Hazell	October 16, 2016	Fired	Gerad Parker (interim)
South Florida	Willie Taggart	December 11, 2016	Hired by Oregon	T. J. Weist (interim)
Temple	Matt Rhule	December 6, 2016	Hired by Baylor	Ed Foley (interim)
Western Kentucky	Jeff Brohm	December 5, 2016	Hired by Purdue	Nick Holt (interim)

=== End of season ===
Team	Outgoing coach	Date	Reason	Replacement
Baylor	Jim Grobe (interim, bowl)	December 6, 2016	Permanent replacement	Matt Rhule
California	Sonny Dykes	January 8, 2017	Fired	Justin Wilcox
Cincinnati	Tommy Tuberville	December 4, 2016	Resigned	Luke Fickell
Florida Atlantic	Charlie Partridge	November 27, 2016	Fired	Lane Kiffin
Georgia State	Tim Lappano (interim)	December 8, 2016	Permanent replacement	Shawn Elliott
Houston	Todd Orlando (interim, bowl) (Note: Although Orlando was originally announced as being the Cougars' head coach for the Las Vegas Bowl, he would ultimately not serve in that role; Applewhite immediately assumed head coaching duties.)	December 9, 2016	Permanent replacement	Major Applewhite
Indiana	Kevin Wilson	December 1, 2016	Resigned	Tom Allen
Minnesota	Tracy Claeys	January 3, 2017	Fired	P. J. Fleck
Nevada	Brian Polian	November 27, 2016	Agreed to part ways	Jay Norvell
Oregon	Mark Helfrich	November 29, 2016	Agreed to part ways	Willie Taggart
Purdue	Gerad Parker (interim)	December 5, 2016	Permanent replacement	Jeff Brohm
San Jose State	Ron Caragher	November 27, 2016	Fired	Brent Brennan
South Florida	T. J. Weist (interim, bowl)	December 11, 2016	Permanent replacement	Charlie Strong
Temple	Ed Foley (interim, bowl)	December 13, 2016	Permanent replacement	Geoff Collins
Texas	Charlie Strong	November 26, 2016	Fired	Tom Herman
UConn	Bob Diaco	December 26, 2016	Fired	Randy Edsall
Western Kentucky	Nick Holt (interim, bowl)	December 12, 2016	Permanent replacement	Mike Sanford Jr.
Western Michigan	P. J. Fleck	January 6, 2017	Hired by Minnesota	Tim Lester

== Television viewers and ratings ==
=== Most watched regular season games ===
All times Eastern. Rankings are from the AP Poll before (11/1) and the CFP Rankings thereafter.

Rank	Date	Matchup				Network	Viewers (millions)	TV Rating	Significance
1	November 26, 12:00pm	No. 3 Michigan	27	No. 2 Ohio State	30	ABC	16.84	9.4	College GameDay/Rivalry
2	September 4, 7:30pm	No. 10 Notre Dame	47	Texas	50	ABC	10.94	6.4	
3	November 5, 8:00pm	No. 1 Alabama	10	No. 13 LSU	0	CBS	10.38	5.8	College GameDay/Rivalry
4	October 1, 8:00pm	No. 3 Louisville	36	No. 5 Clemson	42	ABC	9.29	5.5	College GameDay
5	October 15, 8:00pm	No. 2 Ohio State	30	No. 8 Wisconsin	23	ABC	8.96	5.6	College GameDay
6	October 22, 3:30pm	No. 6 Texas A&M	14	No. 1 Alabama	33	CBS	8.46	5.1	College GameDay
7	September 5, 8:00pm	No. 11 Ole Miss	34	No. 4 Florida State	45	ESPN	8.35	4.8	Camping World Kickoff
8	November 26, 3:30pm	No. 13 Auburn	12	No. 1 Alabama	30	CBS	8.24	4.6	Rivalry
9	September 17, 3:30pm	No. 1 Alabama	48	No. 19 Ole Miss	43	CBS	8.17	5.0	Rivalry
10	September 3, 8:00pm	No. 20 USC	6	No. 1 Alabama	52	ABC	7.94	4.6	Advocare Classic

=== Conference championship games ===
All times Eastern. Rankings are from the CFP Rankings.

Rank	Date	Matchup				Network	Viewers (millions)	TV Rating	Conference	Location
1	December 3	No. 1 Alabama (West)	54	No. 15 Florida (East)	16	CBS	11.09	6.6	SEC	Georgia Dome, Atlanta, GA
2	December 3	No. 6 Wisconsin (West)	31	No. 7 Penn State (East)	38	FOX	9.19	5.2	Big Ten	Lucas Oil Stadium, Indianapolis, IN
3	December 2	No. 8 Colorado (South)	10	No. 4 Washington (North)	41	FOX	5.67	3.4	Pac-12	Levi's Stadium, Santa Clara, CA
4	December 3	No. 3 Clemson (Atlantic)	42	No. 23 Virginia Tech (Coastal)	35	ABC	5.34	3.2	ACC	Camping World Stadium, Orlando, FL
5	December 3	No. 19 Navy (West)	10	Temple (East)	34	ABC	2.05	1.4	AAC	Navy–Marine Corps Memorial Stadium, Annapolis, MD
6	December 2	No. 17 Western Michigan (West)	29	Ohio (East)	23	ESPN2	1.36	0.3	MAC	Ford Field, Detroit, MI
7	December 3	Western Kentucky (East)	58	Louisiana Tech (West)	44	ESPN	0.926	0.6	C-USA	Houchens Industries–L. T. Smith Stadium, Bowling Green, KY
8	December 3	San Diego State (West)	27	Wyoming (Mountain)	24	ESPN	0.713	0.4	MW	War Memorial Stadium, Laramie, WY

=== College Football Playoff ===
All times Eastern. Rankings are from the CFP Rankings.

Game	Date	Matchup				Network	Viewers (millions)	TV Rating	Location
Peach Bowl (semifinal)	December 31, 2016, 3:00pm	No. 4 Washington	7	No. 1 Alabama	24	ESPN	19.34	10.7	Georgia Dome, Atlanta, GA
Fiesta Bowl (semifinal)	December 31, 2016, 7:00pm	No. 3 Ohio State	0	No. 2 Clemson	31	ESPN	19.23	9.8	University of Phoenix Stadium, Glendale, AZ
National Championship	January 9, 2017, 8:30pm	No. 2 Clemson	35	No. 1 Alabama	31	ESPN	25.27	14.2	Raymond James Stadium, Tampa, FL

== Attendance ==
2016 NCAA Division I FBS football attendances:
Team	Home average
Michigan	110,468
Ohio State	107,278
Texas A&M	101,917
Alabama	101,821
LSU	101,231
Tennessee	100,968
Penn State	100,257
Texas	97,881
Georgia	92,746
Nebraska	90,200
Florida	87,846
Auburn	86,937
Oklahoma	86,857
Clemson	80,970
Notre Dame	80,795
Wisconsin	79,357
South Carolina	76,920
Florida State	76,800
Michigan State	74,667
Iowa	69,656
Arkansas	69,581
USC	68,459
UCLA	67,459
Ole Miss	64,910
Washington	64,589
Virginia Tech	63,043
Miami Hurricanes	58,572
BYU	58,569
Mississippi State	58,317
Texas Tech	58,250
West Virginia	57,583
NC State	57,497
Oregon	54,677
Louisville	54,065
Oklahoma State	53,814
Kentucky	53,643
Iowa State	52,557
Missouri	52,236
Kansas State	51,919
North Carolina	50,250
Arizona	48,288
Arizona State	47,736
Georgia Tech	47,503
California	46,628
Colorado	46,609
Utah	46,506
Pittsburgh	46,076
Baylor	45,838
Illinois	45,644
TCU	45,168
Rutgers	44,804
Stanford	44,142
East Carolina	44,113
Minnesota	43,814
Indiana	43,027
Virginia	39,929
Maryland	39,615
Houston	38,953
Oregon State	37,622
South Florida	37,539
Memphis	37,346
San Diego State	37,289
UCF	35,802
Northwestern	34,798
Purdue	34,451
Boise State	34,273
Cincinnati	33,585
Syracuse	32,805
Army	32,653
Boston College	32,157
Washington State	31,675
Navy	31,571
Vanderbilt	31,242
Duke	29,895
Air Force	29,587
Southern Miss	28,588
Colorado State	27,600
Temple	27,225
Connecticut	26,796
Wake Forest	26,456
Appalachian State	26,153
Kansas	25,828
Fresno State	25,493
Marshall	24,760
Hawai'i	24,521
Western Michigan	23,838
SMU	23,712
UTSA	23,038
UTEP	23,001
Tulane	22,718
Arkansas State	22,700
Troy	22,534
Rice	21,425
Wyoming	21,266
Ohio	21,190
Georgia Southern	20,819
Toledo	20,628
Louisiana Tech	20,412
Louisiana-Lafayette	20,224
Old Dominion	20,118
North Texas	19,878
Tulsa	19,234
Utah State	19,136
New Mexico	18,708
Nevada	18,501
UNLV	18,389
Texas State	18,120
Western Kentucky	17,705
Eastern Michigan	17,677
Buffalo	17,493
Central Michigan	17,408
Middle Tennessee	17,243
Miami RedHawks	17,110
FIU	16,789
South Alabama	16,250
San José State	15,419
Bowling Green	15,140
Georgia State	15,103
Massachusetts	14,510
Charlotte	14,192
Louisiana-Monroe	12,610
Idaho	11,190
Northern Illinois	11,019
Kent State	10,898
Akron	10,337
FAU	10,073
New Mexico State	9,545
Ball State	7,789

== See also ==
- 2016 NCAA Division I FCS football season
- 2016 NCAA Division II football season
- 2016 NCAA Division III football season
- 2016 NAIA football season
