= Ahmmon Richards =

American football player (born 1998)

Profile
- Position: Wide receiver

Personal information
- Born: May 21, 1998 (age 28); Wellington, Florida, U.S.
- Listed height: 6 ft 1 in (1.85 m)
- Listed weight: 190 lb (86 kg)

Career information
- High school: Wellington (FL)
- College: Miami (2016–2018)

Awards and highlights
- Second team All-ACC (2016)

Ahmmon Richards (born May 20, 1998) is an American former football wide receiver. His career came to an end after sustaining a neck injury in the first game of the 2018 season.

== Early life ==
Richards attended Wellington High School in Wellington, Florida. During his career he had 144 receptions for 2,722 yards and 39 touchdowns. He committed to the University of Miami to play college football.

== College career ==
Richards played in all 13 games and made 11 starts as a true freshman at Miami in 2016. He finished the season with 934 receiving yards, which broke Michael Irvin's school record for receiving yards by a freshman. He was second on the team with 49 receptions and three touchdowns.

On October 6, 2018, it was announced that Richards' playing career had come to an end due to a disabling neck injury he suffered during the first game of the season. “I’m extremely appreciative of the University’s athletic training and medical staffs for diagnosing this injury, and to the football coaches and staff for always putting my health first,” Richards said in the release. “I plan to continue working towards my degree at UM and look forward to the next chapter in my life.”

== Personal life ==
Ahmmon's brother Mark-Antony Richards, who also attended Wellington High School, is three years younger. They had a very strong bond. He was a college football running back for the Auburn Tigers and UCF Knights.
