= 2016–17 NCAA football bowl games =

- Season: 2016
- Regular season: August 27, 2016 – December 10, 2016
- Number of bowls: 42 (Note: 41 FBS bowl games, including the College Football Playoff National Championship Game, and 1 FCS bowl game.)
- All-star games: 4
- Bowl games: December 17, 2016 – January 9, 2017
- National Championship: 2017 College Football Playoff; National Championship
- Location of Championship: Raymond James Stadium; Tampa, Florida
- Champions: Clemson Tigers
- Bowl Challenge Cup winner: ACC
Bowl record by conference
Conference	Bowls	Record	Number of teams in final AP poll
SEC	13	6–7 (0.462)	5
ACC	12	9–3 (0.750)	5
Big Ten	10	3–7 (0.300)	4
American	7	2–5 (0.286)	1
Conference USA	7	4–3 (0.571)	0
Mountain West	7	4–3 (0.571)	1
Big 12	6	4–2 (0.667)	3
MAC	6	0–6 (0.000)	1
Pac-12	6	3–3 (0.500)	5
Sun Belt	6	4–2 (0.667)	0
Independents	2	2–0 (1.000)	0

The 2016–17 NCAA football bowl games were a series of college football bowl games which completed the 2016 NCAA Division I FBS football season. The games began on December 17, 2016, and aside from the all-star games ended with the 2017 College Football Playoff National Championship which was played on January 9, 2017.

The total of 41 team-competitive postseason games in FBS, including the national championship game, was unchanged from the previous year. While bowl games had been the purview of only the very best teams for nearly a century, this was the eleventh consecutive year that teams with non-winning seasons participated in bowl games. To fill the 80 available team-competitive bowl slots, a new record of 20 teams (25% of all participants) with non-winning seasons participated in bowl games—17 had a .500 (6–6) season, and three losing teams with sub-.500 records (one 6–7 and two 5–7). This was the fifth time in six years that teams with actual losing records were invited to bowl games. None of the six teams that played in bowls on December 26 had a winning record.

== Schedule ==
The schedule for the 2016–17 bowl games are below. All times are EST (UTC−5).

=== College Football Playoff and Championship Game ===
The College Football Playoff system was used to determine a national champion of Division I FBS college football. A 13-member committee of experts ranked the top 25 teams in the nation after each of the last seven weeks of the 2016 season. The top four teams in the final ranking then played a single-elimination semifinal round, with the winners advancing to the National Championship game.

The semi-final games were held at the Peach Bowl and the Fiesta Bowl as part of a yearly rotation of three pairs of six bowls. Their winners advanced to the 2017 College Football Playoff National Championship at Raymond James Stadium in Tampa, Florida, on January 9, 2017. As with the 2015 season, the two semi-final bowls were held on New Year's Eve (Saturday, December 31, 2016), as the Rose Bowl and Sugar Bowl are guaranteed exclusive TV time slots on January 2 if New Year's Day fell on a Sunday (there is a gentleman's agreement to not play New Year's Day bowl games against NFL games, which are played as usual when New Year's Day falls on a Sunday), regardless of whether they will be hosting a semifinal game.

To reduce the impact of the semi-final games' New Year's Eve scheduling—a factor that led to lower viewership of the 2015 semi-finals in comparison to 2014, it was announced on March 8, 2016, that the kickoff times of the two bowls would be pushed forward to 3:00 pm and 7:00 pm ET. CFP commissioner Bill Hancock suggested that starting the games earlier would allow viewers to partake in both the CFP games and New Year's festivities. As the earlier start intrudes on the early afternoon window for New Year's Six games, the 2016 Orange Bowl was instead held as a primetime game on December 30, 2016. As a result, the "New Year's Six" bowls were stretched across a period of four days, rather than two consecutive days of three games each. In July 2016, Hancock announced that future semi-finals, when not hosted by the Rose and Sugar Bowl games, will generally be held on the final Saturday of the year.

Of the Power Five conferences, The Big Ten was represented with four teams in the New Year's Six, whereas the ACC, SEC and Pac-12 had two teams each. The Big 12 was again left out of the semifinals, and had just one team in the New Year's Six. The Group of 5 was represented by the MAC.

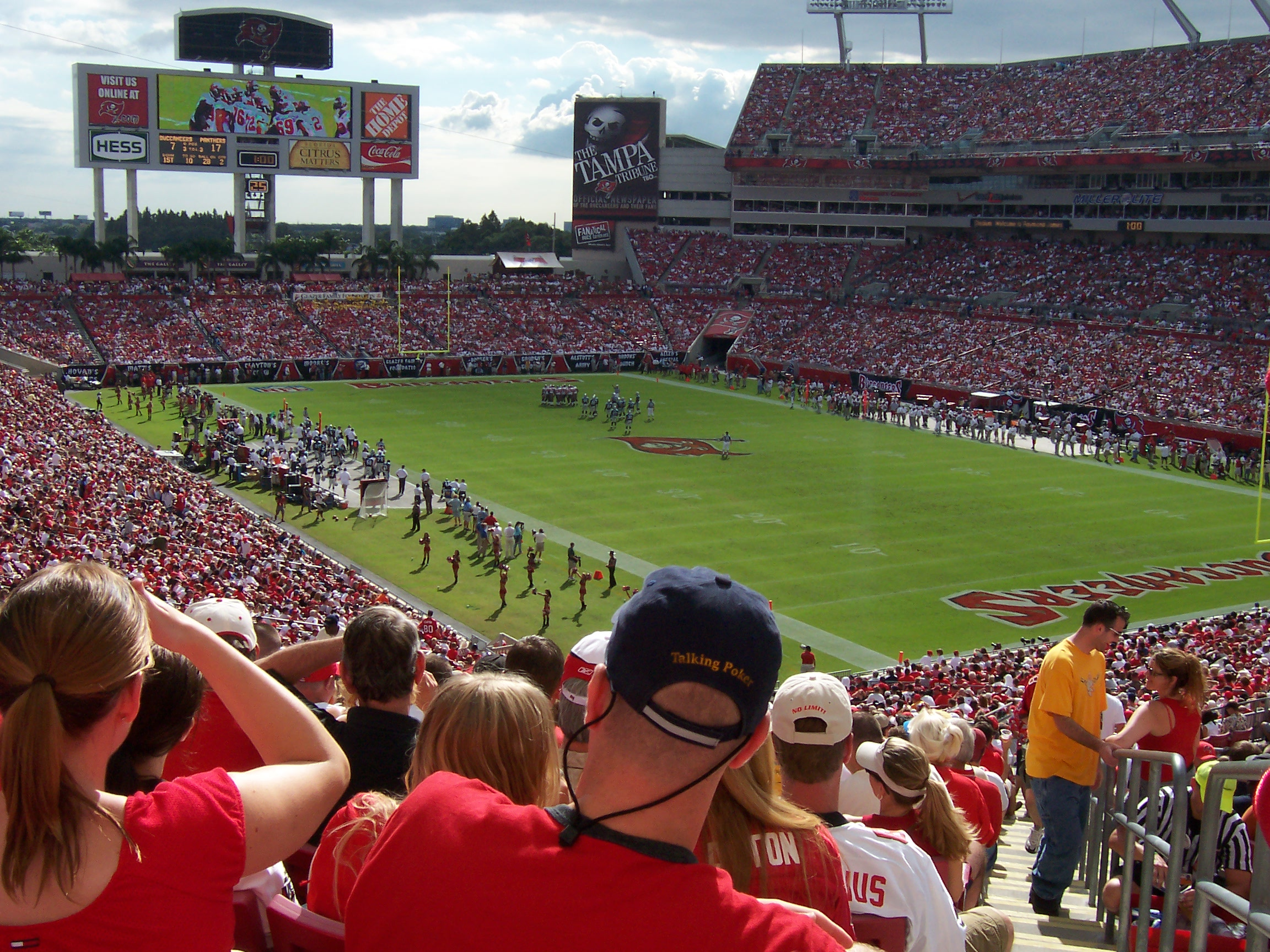
Raymond James Stadium, site of the National Championship game

Semifinals
December 31 – Peach Bowl Georgia Dome, Atlanta
1	Alabama	24
4	Washington	7
December 31 – Fiesta Bowl University of Phoenix Stadium, Glendale
2	Clemson	31
3	Ohio State	0

Championship
January 9 – Championship Raymond James Stadium, Tampa
1	Alabama	31
2	Clemson	35

Date	Game	Site	Teams	Affiliations	Results
Dec. 30	Orange Bowl	Hard Rock Stadium; Miami Gardens, FL; 8:00 pm	No. 11 Florida State Seminoles (9–3); No. 6 Michigan Wolverines (10–2)	ACC; Big Ten	Florida State 33; Michigan 32
Dec. 31	Peach Bowl (Playoff Semifinal Game)	Georgia Dome; Atlanta, GA; 3:00 pm	No. 1 Alabama Crimson Tide (13–0); No. 4 Washington Huskies (12–1)	SEC; Pac-12	Alabama 24; Washington 7
Dec. 31	Fiesta Bowl (Playoff Semifinal Game)	University of Phoenix Stadium; Glendale, AZ; 7:00 pm	No. 2 Clemson Tigers (12–1); No. 3 Ohio State Buckeyes (11–1)	ACC; Big Ten	Clemson 31; Ohio State 0
Jan. 2	Cotton Bowl Classic	AT&T Stadium; Arlington, TX; 1:00 pm	No. 8 Wisconsin Badgers (10–3); No. 15 Western Michigan Broncos (13–0)	Big Ten; MAC	Wisconsin 24; Western Michigan 16
Jan. 2	Rose Bowl	Rose Bowl; Pasadena, CA; 5:00 pm	No. 9 USC Trojans (9–3); No. 5 Penn State Nittany Lions (11–2)	Pac-12; Big Ten	USC 52; Penn State 49
Jan. 2	Sugar Bowl	Mercedes-Benz Superdome; New Orleans, LA; 8:30 pm	No. 7 Oklahoma Sooners (10–2); No. 14 Auburn Tigers (8–4)	Big 12; SEC	Oklahoma 35; Auburn 19
Jan. 9	College Football Playoff National Championship (Peach Bowl Winner vs. Fiesta Bowl Winner)	Raymond James Stadium; Tampa, FL; 8:30 pm	No. 2 Clemson Tigers (13–1); No. 1 Alabama Crimson Tide (14–0)	ACC; SEC	Clemson 35; Alabama 31

=== Non-CFP bowl games ===
On April 11, 2016, the NCAA announced a freeze on new bowl games until after the 2019 season. While bowl games had been the purview of only the very best teams for nearly a century, the NCAA had to lower its postseason eligibility criteria repeatedly (2006, 2009, 2010, 2012 and 2013), eventually allowing teams with losing records (5–7) to participate in bowls due to there being not enough bowl-eligible teams, while also having to allow teams from the same (Mountain West) conference to meet in the 2015 Arizona Bowl due to the lack of eligible teams to meet its other tie-ins. For the 2016–17 bowl season, 63% of the 128 teams playing in Division I FBS were deemed eligible and received invites to fill the 80 available slots.

Prior to the moratorium, multiple new bowl games were proposed for or approved to begin play in 2016, including one in Myrtle Beach, the Medal of Honor Bowl (which planned to convert itself from an all-star game to a sanctioned bowl after the NCAA lifted its ban on postseason championships at pre-determined locations in South Carolina), the Sun Belt/American Austin Bowl, and a Mountain West/Pac-12 bowl in Melbourne, Australia. The Sun Belt subsequently announced that it would become a new primary tie-in for the Arizona Bowl.

Date	Game	Site	Television	Teams	Affiliations	Results
Dec. 17	New Mexico Bowl	University Stadium; Albuquerque, NM; 2:00 pm	ESPN	New Mexico Lobos (8–4); UTSA Roadrunners (6–6)	Mountain West; C-USA	New Mexico 23; UTSA 20
Dec. 17	Las Vegas Bowl	Sam Boyd Stadium; Whitney, NV; 3:30 pm	ABC	San Diego State Aztecs (10–3); Houston Cougars (9–3)	Mountain West; American	San Diego State 34; Houston 10
Dec. 17	Camellia Bowl	Cramton Bowl; Montgomery, AL; 5:30 pm	ESPN	Appalachian State Mountaineers (9–3); Toledo Rockets (9–3)	Sun Belt; MAC	Appalachian State 31; Toledo 28
Dec. 17	Cure Bowl	Camping World Stadium; Orlando, FL; 5:30 pm	CBSSN	Arkansas State Red Wolves (7–5); UCF Knights (6–6)	Sun Belt; American	Arkansas State 31; UCF 13
Dec. 17	New Orleans Bowl	Mercedes-Benz Superdome; New Orleans, LA; 9:00 pm	ESPN	Southern Miss Golden Eagles (6–6); Louisiana–Lafayette Ragin' Cajuns (6–6)	C-USA; Sun Belt	Southern Miss 28; Louisiana–Lafayette 21
Dec. 19	Miami Beach Bowl	Marlins Park; Miami, FL; 2:30 pm	ESPN	Tulsa Golden Hurricane (9–3); Central Michigan Chippewas (6–6)	American; MAC	Tulsa 55; Central Michigan 10
Dec. 20	Boca Raton Bowl	FAU Stadium; Boca Raton, FL; 7:00 pm	ESPN	Western Kentucky Hilltoppers (10–3); Memphis Tigers (8–4)	C-USA; American	Western Kentucky 51; Memphis 31
Dec. 21	Poinsettia Bowl	SDCCU Stadium; San Diego, CA; 9:00 pm	ESPN	BYU Cougars (8–4); Wyoming Cowboys (8–5)	Independent; Mountain West	BYU 24; Wyoming 21
Dec. 22	Famous Idaho Potato Bowl	Albertsons Stadium; Boise, ID; 7:00 pm	ESPN	Idaho Vandals (8–4); Colorado State Rams (7–5)	Sun Belt; Mountain West	Idaho 61; Colorado State 50
Dec. 23	Bahamas Bowl	Thomas Robinson Stadium; Nassau, Bahamas; 1:00 pm	ESPN	Old Dominion Monarchs (9–3); Eastern Michigan Eagles (7–5)	C-USA; MAC	Old Dominion 24; Eastern Michigan 20
Dec. 23	Armed Forces Bowl	Amon G. Carter Stadium; Fort Worth, TX; 4:30 pm	ESPN	Louisiana Tech Bulldogs (8–5); No. 25 Navy Midshipmen (9–4)	C-USA; American	Louisiana Tech 48; Navy 45
Dec. 23	Dollar General Bowl	Ladd–Peebles Stadium; Mobile, AL; 8:00 pm	ESPN	Troy Trojans (9–3); Ohio Bobcats (8–5)	Sun Belt; MAC	Troy 28; Ohio 23
Dec. 24	Hawaiʻi Bowl	Aloha Stadium; Honolulu, HI; 8:00 pm	ESPN	Hawaii Rainbow Warriors (6–7); Middle Tennessee Blue Raiders (8–4)	Mountain West; C-USA	Hawaii 52; Middle Tennessee 35
Dec. 26	St. Petersburg Bowl	Tropicana Field; St. Petersburg, FL; 11:00 am	ESPN	Mississippi State Bulldogs (5–7); Miami (OH) RedHawks (6–6)	SEC; MAC	Mississippi State 17; Miami (OH) 16
Dec. 26	Quick Lane Bowl	Ford Field; Detroit, MI; 2:30 pm	ESPN	Boston College Eagles (6–6); Maryland Terrapins (6–6)	ACC; Big Ten	Boston College 36; Maryland 30
Dec. 26	Independence Bowl	Independence Stadium; Shreveport, LA; 5:00 pm	ESPN2	NC State Wolfpack (6–6); Vanderbilt Commodores (6–6)	ACC; SEC	NC State 41; Vanderbilt 17
Dec. 27	Heart of Dallas Bowl	Cotton Bowl; Dallas, TX; 12:00 pm	ESPN	Army Black Knights (7–5); North Texas Mean Green (5–7)	Independent; C-USA	Army 38; North Texas 31 (OT)
Dec. 27	Military Bowl	Navy–Marine Corps Memorial Stadium; Annapolis, MD; 3:30 pm	ESPN	Wake Forest Demon Deacons (6–6); No. 24 Temple Owls (10–3)	ACC; American	Wake Forest 34; Temple 26
Dec. 27	Holiday Bowl	SDCCU Stadium; San Diego, CA; 7:00 pm	ESPN	Minnesota Golden Gophers (8–4); Washington State Cougars (8–4)	Big Ten; Pac-12	Minnesota 17; Washington State 12
Dec. 27	Cactus Bowl	Chase Field; Phoenix, AZ; 10:15 pm	ESPN	Baylor Bears (6–6); Boise State Broncos (10–2)	Big 12; Mountain West	Baylor 31; Boise State 12
Dec. 28	Pinstripe Bowl	Yankee Stadium; Bronx, NY; 2:00 pm	ESPN	Northwestern Wildcats (6–6); No. 23 Pittsburgh Panthers (8–4)	Big Ten; ACC	Northwestern 31; Pittsburgh 24
Dec. 28	Russell Athletic Bowl	Camping World Stadium; Orlando, FL; 5:30 pm	ESPN	Miami (FL) Hurricanes (8–4); No. 16 West Virginia Mountaineers (10–2)	ACC; Big 12	Miami (FL) 31; West Virginia 14
Dec. 28	Foster Farms Bowl	Levi's Stadium; Santa Clara, CA; 8:30 pm	Fox	No. 19 Utah Utes (8–4); Indiana Hoosiers (6–6)	Pac-12; Big Ten	Utah 26; Indiana 24
Dec. 28	Texas Bowl	NRG Stadium; Houston, TX; 9:00 pm	ESPN	Kansas State Wildcats (8–4); Texas A&M Aggies (8–4)	Big 12; SEC	Kansas State 33; Texas A&M 28
Dec. 29	Birmingham Bowl	Legion Field; Birmingham, AL; 2:00 pm	ESPN	South Florida Bulls (10–2); South Carolina Gamecocks (6–6)	American; SEC	South Florida 46; South Carolina 39 (OT)
Dec. 29	Belk Bowl	Bank of America Stadium; Charlotte, NC; 5:30 pm	ESPN	No. 22 Virginia Tech Hokies (9–4); Arkansas Razorbacks (7–5)	ACC; SEC	Virginia Tech 35; Arkansas 24
Dec. 29	Alamo Bowl	Alamodome; San Antonio, TX; 9:00 pm	ESPN	No. 12 Oklahoma State Cowboys (9–3); No. 10 Colorado Buffaloes (10–3)	Big 12; Pac-12	Oklahoma State 38; Colorado 8
Dec. 30	Liberty Bowl	Liberty Bowl Memorial Stadium; Memphis, TN; 12:00 pm	ESPN	Georgia Bulldogs (7–5); TCU Horned Frogs (6–6)	SEC; Big 12	Georgia 31; TCU 23
Dec. 30	Sun Bowl	Sun Bowl Stadium; El Paso, TX; 2:00 pm	CBS	No. 18 Stanford Cardinal (9–3); North Carolina Tar Heels (8–4)	Pac-12; ACC	Stanford 25; North Carolina 23
Dec. 30	Music City Bowl	Nissan Stadium; Nashville, TN; 3:30 pm	ESPN	No. 21 Tennessee Volunteers (8–4); Nebraska Cornhuskers (9–3)	SEC; Big Ten	Tennessee 38; Nebraska 24
Dec. 30	Arizona Bowl	Arizona Stadium; Tucson, AZ; 5:30 pm	ASN	Air Force Falcons (9–3); South Alabama Jaguars (6–6)	Mountain West; Sun Belt	Air Force 45; South Alabama 21
Dec. 31	Citrus Bowl	Camping World Stadium; Orlando, FL; 11:00 am	ABC	No. 20 LSU Tigers (8–4); No. 13 Louisville Cardinals (9–3)	SEC; ACC	LSU 29; Louisville 9
Dec. 31	TaxSlayer Bowl	EverBank Field; Jacksonville, FL; 11:00 am	ESPN	Georgia Tech Yellow Jackets (8–4); Kentucky Wildcats (7–5)	ACC; SEC	Georgia Tech 33; Kentucky 18
Jan. 2	Outback Bowl	Raymond James Stadium; Tampa, FL; 1:00 pm	ABC	No. 17 Florida Gators (8–4); Iowa Hawkeyes (8–4)	SEC; Big Ten	Florida 30; Iowa 3

=== All-star games ===
Date	Game	Site	Television	Participants	Results
Jan. 15	Tropical Bowl	Daytona Stadium; Daytona Beach, Florida	PPV	National Team; American Team	National 28; American 14
Jan. 21	East–West Shrine Game	Tropicana Field; St. Petersburg, FL; 3:00 pm	NFL Network	East Team; West Team	West 10; East 3
Jan. 21	NFLPA Collegiate Bowl	StubHub Center; Carson, CA; 6:00 pm	FS1	National Team; American Team	National 27; American 7
Jan. 28	Senior Bowl	Ladd–Peebles Stadium; Mobile, AL; 2:30 pm	NFL Network	North Team; South Team	South 16; North 15

=== FCS bowl game ===
The FCS has one bowl game; they also have a championship bracket that began on November 26 and ended on January 7.

Date	Game	Site	Television	Participants	Affiliations	Results
Dec. 17	Celebration Bowl	Georgia Dome; Atlanta, Georgia; 12:00 pm	ABC	Grambling State Tigers (11–1); North Carolina Central Eagles (9–2)	MEAC; SWAC	Grambling State 10; North Carolina Central 9

== Selection of the teams ==
=== CFP top 25 teams ===
On December 4, 2016, the College Football Playoff selection committee announced their final team rankings for the year:

In the third year of the College Football Playoff era, this was the first time that one of the four semifinalists (Ohio State) was not a conference champion.

Rank	Team	W–L	Conference and standing	Bowl game
1	Alabama Crimson Tide	13–0	SEC champions	Peach Bowl (CFP semifinal)
2	Clemson Tigers	12–1	ACC champions	Fiesta Bowl (CFP semifinal)
3	Ohio State Buckeyes	11–1	Big Ten East Division co-champions	Fiesta Bowl (CFP semifinal)
4	Washington Huskies	12–1	Pac-12 champions	Peach Bowl (CFP semifinal)
5	Penn State Nittany Lions	11–2	Big Ten champions	Rose Bowl (NY6)
6	Michigan Wolverines	10–2	Big Ten East Division third place	Orange Bowl (NY6)
7	Oklahoma Sooners	10–2	Big 12 champions	Sugar Bowl (NY6)
8	Wisconsin Badgers	10–3	Big Ten West Division champions	Cotton Bowl Classic (NY6)
9	USC Trojans	9–3	Pac-12 South Division second place	Rose Bowl (NY6)
10	Colorado Buffaloes	10–3	Pac-12 South Division champions	Alamo Bowl
11	Florida State Seminoles	9–3	ACC Atlantic Division third place	Orange Bowl (NY6)
12	Oklahoma State Cowboys	9–3	Big 12 second place (tie)	Alamo Bowl
13	Louisville Cardinals	9–3	ACC Atlantic Division co-champions	Citrus Bowl
14	Auburn Tigers	8–4	SEC West Division second place (tie)	Sugar Bowl (NY6)
15	Western Michigan Broncos	13–0	MAC Champions	Cotton Bowl Classic (NY6)
16	West Virginia Mountaineers	10–2	Big 12 second place (tie)	Russell Athletic Bowl
17	Florida Gators	8–4	SEC East Division champions	Outback Bowl
18	Stanford Cardinal	9–3	Pac-12 North Division third place	Sun Bowl
19	Utah Utes	8–4	Pac-12 South Division third place	Foster Farms Bowl
20	LSU Tigers	7–4	SEC West Division second place (tie)	Citrus Bowl
21	Tennessee Volunteers	8–4	SEC East Division second place (tie)	Music City Bowl
22	Virginia Tech Hokies	9–4	ACC Coastal Division champions	Belk Bowl
23	Pittsburgh Panthers	8–4	ACC Coastal Division second place (tie)	Pinstripe Bowl
24	Temple Owls	10–3	American champions	Military Bowl
25	Navy Midshipmen	9–4	American West Division champions	Armed Forces Bowl

=== Conference champions' bowl games ===
Only the Peach Bowl featured two conference champions playing against each other. Rankings are per the above CFP standings.

Conference	Champion	W–L	Rank	Bowl game
ACC	Clemson Tigers	12–1	2	Fiesta Bowl
American	Temple Owls	10–3	24	Military Bowl
Big Ten	Penn State Nittany Lions	11–2	5	Rose Bowl
Big 12	Oklahoma Sooners	10–2	7	Sugar Bowl
C-USA	Western Kentucky Hilltoppers	10–3	—	Boca Raton Bowl
MAC	Western Michigan Broncos	13–0	15	Cotton Bowl Classic
Mountain West	San Diego State Aztecs	10–3	—	Las Vegas Bowl
Pac-12	Washington Huskies	12–1	4	Peach Bowl
SEC	Alabama Crimson Tide	13–0	1	Peach Bowl
Sun Belt†	Appalachian State Mountaineers	9–3	—	Camellia Bowl
Sun Belt†	Arkansas State Red Wolves	7–5	—	Cure Bowl

† denotes a conference that named co-champions

=== Bowl-eligible teams ===
- ACC (11): Boston College, Clemson, Florida State, Georgia Tech, Louisville, Miami (FL), NC State, North Carolina, Pittsburgh, Virginia Tech, Wake Forest
- American (7): Houston, Memphis, Navy, South Florida, Temple, Tulsa, UCF
- Big Ten (10): Indiana, Iowa, Maryland, Michigan, Minnesota, Nebraska, Northwestern, Ohio State, Penn State, Wisconsin
- Big 12 (6): Baylor, Kansas State, Oklahoma, Oklahoma State, TCU, West Virginia
- C-USA (7): Louisiana Tech, Middle Tennessee, North Texas (qualified via APR score), Old Dominion, Southern Miss, UTSA, Western Kentucky
- MAC (6): Central Michigan, Eastern Michigan, Miami (OH), Ohio, Toledo, Western Michigan
- Mountain West (7): Air Force, Boise State, Colorado State, Hawaii, New Mexico, San Diego State, Wyoming
- Pac-12 (6): Colorado, Stanford, USC, Utah, Washington, Washington State
- SEC (12): Alabama, Arkansas, Auburn, Florida, Georgia, Kentucky, LSU, Mississippi State (qualified via APR score), South Carolina, Tennessee, Texas A&M, Vanderbilt
- Sun Belt (6): Appalachian State, Arkansas State, Idaho, Louisiana–Lafayette, South Alabama, Troy
- Independent (2): Army, BYU

Number of bowl berths available: 80
Number of bowl-eligible teams: 76
Number of conditional bowl-eligible teams: 2 (Hawaii, South Alabama)
Number of teams qualified by APR: 2 (North Texas, Mississippi State)

1. Hawaii played 13 games (6–7), and thus has already qualified for the Hawaii Bowl because they hold priority over 5–7 teams.
2. South Alabama is 6–6 with two wins over Football Championship Subdivision opponents. Only one such win counts toward official bowl eligibility. South Alabama is conditionally bowl eligible and will play in a bowl game as there will be unfilled bowl berths. Originally, South Alabama was to play FBS Louisiana State University on November 19, but LSU had to cancel that game to makeup their game against Florida, which was postponed due to Hurricane Matthew. The game against the FCS Presbyterian Blue Hose was added to replace that game.

=== Bowl-ineligible teams ===
- ACC (3): Duke, Syracuse, Virginia
- American (5): Cincinnati, East Carolina, SMU, Tulane, UConn
- Big Ten (4): Illinois, Michigan State, Purdue, Rutgers
- Big 12 (4): Iowa State, Kansas, Texas, Texas Tech
- C-USA (6): Charlotte, FIU, Florida Atlantic, Marshall, Rice, UTEP
- MAC (6): Akron, Ball State, Bowling Green, Buffalo, Kent State, Northern Illinois
- Mountain West (5): Fresno State, Nevada, San Jose State, Utah State, UNLV
- Pac-12 (6): Arizona, Arizona State, California, Oregon, Oregon State, UCLA
- SEC (2): Missouri, Ole Miss
- Sun Belt (5): Georgia Southern, Georgia State, Louisiana–Monroe, New Mexico State, Texas State
- Independent (2): Notre Dame, UMass

Number of bowl-ineligible teams: 48

Note: Being bowl-ineligible does not, in itself, exclude a team from the chance to play in a bowl game. Tiebreaker procedures based on a school's Academic Progress Rate (APR) allowed for the possibility of 5–7 teams to play in bowl games since not enough teams qualified to fill all 80 spots with at least a 6–6 record.
