= 2016 NCAA football bowl games =

In college football, 2016 NCAA football bowl games may refer to:

- 2015–16 NCAA football bowl games, for games played in January 2016 as part of the 2015 season.
- 2016–17 NCAA football bowl games, for games played in December 2016 as part of the 2016 season.
