= 2017 NCAA football bowl games =

In college football, 2017 NCAA football bowl games may refer to:

- 2016–17 NCAA football bowl games, for games played in January 2017 as part of the 2016 season.
- 2017–18 NCAA football bowl games, for games played in December 2017 as part of the 2017 season.
