= 2016 Sun Bowl =

American college football game

2016 Hyundai Sun Bowl
- 83rd Sun Bowl
Stanford Cardinal	North Carolina Tar Heels
(9–3)	(8–4)
Pac-12	ACC
25	23
Head coach: David Shaw	Head coach: Larry Fedora
AP / Coaches / CFP; 16 / 16 / 18
	1	2	3	4	Total
Stanford	7	6	3	9	25
North Carolina	7	0	10	6	23
- Date: December 30, 2016
- Season: 2016
- Stadium: Sun Bowl
- Location: El Paso, Texas
- MVP: Solomon Thomas (DE), Stanford
- Favorite: Stanford by 3
- National anthem: Elia Esparza
- Referee: John McDaid (SEC)
- Attendance: 42,166
- Payout: US$2,150,000

United States TV coverage
- Network: CBS
- Announcers: Brad Nessler (play-by-play); Gary Danielson (color); Allie LaForce (sideline)

The 2016 Sun Bowl (December) was a postseason college football bowl game, played on December 30, 2016. It was one of the 2016–17 bowl games concluding the 2016 FBS football season. It featured the Stanford Cardinal of the Pac-12 Conference and the North Carolina Tar Heels of the Atlantic Coast Conference.

== Game summary ==
=== Scoring summary ===
Scoring summary

Quarter	Time	Drive			Team	Scoring information	Score	
Quarter	Time	Plays	Yards	TOP	Team	Scoring information	STAN	UNC
1	8:58	10	71	4:16	UNC	Ryan Switzer 19-yard touchdown reception from Mitch Trubisky, Nick Weiler kick good	0	7
1	6:11	6	75	2:47	STAN	Bryce Love 49-yard touchdown reception from Keller Chryst, Conrad Ukropina kick good	7	7
2	14:13	12	29	5:12	STAN	44-yard field goal by Conrad Ukropina	10	7
2	0:32	5	2	1:20	STAN	33-yard field goal by Conrad Ukropina	13	7
3	10:18	5	40	1:53	STAN	43-yard field goal by Conrad Ukropina	16	7
3	6:56	8	55	3:22	UNC	37-yard field goal by Nick Weiler	16	10
3	2:09	9	68	3:12	UNC	Jordon Brown 5-yard touchdown run, Nick Weiler kick good	16	17
4	14:13				STAN	Interception returned 19 yards for touchdown by Dallas Lloyd, 2-point pass failed	22	17
4	3:23	12	70	7:17	STAN	27-yard field goal by Conrad Ukropina	25	17
4	0:25	10	97	1:09	UNC	Bug Howard 2-yard touchdown reception from Mitch Trubisky, 2-point run failed	25	23
"TOP" = time of possession. For other American football terms, see Glossary of American football.							25	23

=== Statistics ===
Statistics	STAN	UNC
First downs	16	25
Plays-yards	61–287	75–398
Third down efficiency	5–15	5–13
Rushes-yards	44–133	37–118
Passing yards	154	280
Passing, Comp-Att-Int	9–17–0	23–38–2
Time of Possession	32:25	27:35

Team	Category	Player	Statistics
STAN	Passing	Ryan Burns	6–11, 86 yards
STAN	Rushing	Bryce Love	22 carries, 115 yards
STAN	Receiving	Bryce Love	1 reception, 49 yards
UNC	Passing	Mitchell Trubisky	23–38, 280 yards
UNC	Rushing	T.J. Logan	19 carries, 72 yards
UNC	Receiving	Austin Proehl	7 receptions, 91 yards
