= 2016 North Carolina Tar Heels football team =

American college football season

2016 North Carolina Tar Heels football

Sun Bowl, L 23–25 vs. Stanford
- Conference: Atlantic Coast Conference
- Coastal Division
- Record: 8–5 (5–3 ACC)
- Head coach: Larry Fedora (5th season)
- Co-offensive coordinators: Gunter Brewer (3rd season); Chris Kapilovic (3rd season)
- Offensive scheme: Spread
- Defensive coordinator: Gene Chizik (2nd season)
- Base defense: 4–3
- Captains: Mack Hollins; Nazair Jones; Des Lawrence; Caleb Peterson; Mitchell Trubisky; Nick Weiler
- Home stadium: Kenan Memorial Stadium

Uniform
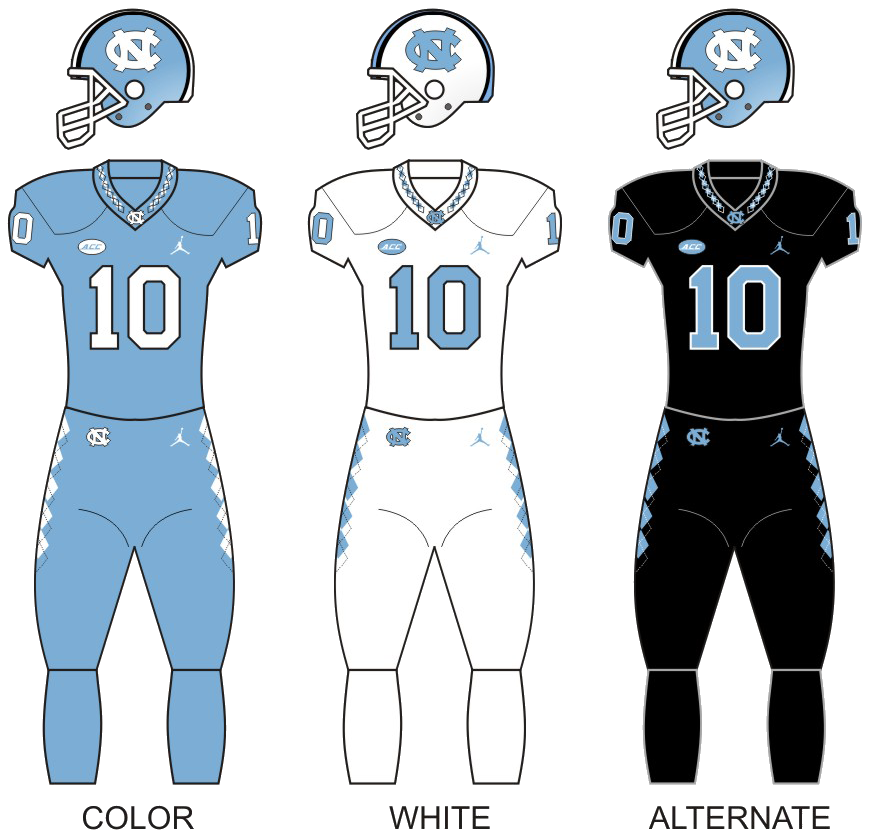

2016 Atlantic Coast Conference football standings
| | Conf. | | | Overall |
| Team | W | | L | W | | L |
|---|---|---|---|---|---|---|
Atlantic Division
| No. 1 Clemson xy$# | 7 | – | 1 | 14 | – | 1 |
| No. 21 Louisville x | 7 | – | 1 | 9 | – | 4 |
| No. 8 Florida State | 5 | – | 3 | 10 | – | 3 |
| NC State | 3 | – | 5 | 7 | – | 6 |
| Wake Forest | 3 | – | 5 | 7 | – | 6 |
| Boston College | 2 | – | 6 | 7 | – | 6 |
| Syracuse | 2 | – | 6 | 4 | – | 8 |
Coastal Division
| No. 16 Virginia Tech xy | 6 | – | 2 | 10 | – | 4 |
| North Carolina | 5 | – | 3 | 8 | – | 5 |
| No. 20 Miami (FL) | 5 | – | 3 | 9 | – | 4 |
| Pittsburgh | 5 | – | 3 | 8 | – | 5 |
| Georgia Tech | 4 | – | 4 | 9 | – | 4 |
| Duke | 1 | – | 7 | 4 | – | 8 |
| Virginia | 1 | – | 7 | 2 | – | 10 |
Championship: Clemson 42, Virginia Tech 35
# – College Football Playoff champion; $ – Conference champion; x – Division champion/co-champions; y – Championship game participant; Rankings from AP Poll

The 2016 North Carolina Tar Heels football team represented the University of North Carolina at Chapel Hill as a member of Coastal Division of the Atlantic Coast Conference (ACC) during the 2016 NCAA Division I FBS football season. The team was led by fifth-year head coach Larry Fedora and played their home games at Kenan Memorial Stadium. The Tar Heels finished the season 8–5 overall and 5–3 in ACC play to place in a three-way tie for second in the Coastal Division. They were invited to the Sun Bowl, where they lost to Stanford.

== Recruiting ==
National Signing Day was on February 3, 2016 and was the first chance for high school seniors to officially declare which university or college they will be attending for their college career. North Carolina had 26 high school seniors sign a National Letter of Intent to play football with them. Of the class, 7 athletes enrolled early to UNC.

College recruiting information (2016)
| Name | Hometown | School | Height | Weight | 40^{‡} | Commit date |
|---|---|---|---|---|---|---|
| Jordon Brown; RB | Durham, NC | Southern Durham HS | 5 ft 11 in (1.80 m) | 182 lb (83 kg) | 4.56 | Aug 17, 2015 |
| Jordon Brown; RB | Recruit ratings: Scout: Rivals: 247Sports: ESPN: (79) | | | | | |
| Logan Byrd; QB | Kathleen, GA | Veterans HS | 6 ft 3 in (1.91 m) | 238 lb (108 kg) | 4.89 | Apr 9, 2015 |
| Logan Byrd; QB | Recruit ratings: Scout: Rivals: 247Sports: ESPN: (80) | | | | | |
| Kyree Campbell^ DT | Woodbridge, VA | Woodbridge HS | 6 ft 5 in (1.96 m) | 305 lb (138 kg) | 5.44 | Aug 5, 2015 |
| Kyree Campbell^ DT | Recruit ratings: Scout: Rivals: 247Sports: ESPN: (80) | | | | | |
| Allen Cater; DE | Kennesaw, GA | Mount Paran Christian School | 6 ft 4 in (1.93 m) | 242 lb (110 kg) | 5.32 | Feb 3, 2016 |
| Allen Cater; DE | Recruit ratings: Scout: Rivals: 247Sports: ESPN: (73) | | | | | |
| J.B. Copeland; LB | Southlake, TX | Navarro College | 6 ft 2 in (1.88 m) | 220 lb (100 kg) | N/A | Feb 4, 2016 |
| J.B. Copeland; LB | Recruit ratings: Scout: Rivals: 247Sports: ESPN: (74) | | | | | |
| Nolan DeFranco; DE | Winter Garden, FL | West Orange HS | 6 ft 6 in (1.98 m) | 226 lb (103 kg) | 4.89 | Jun 17, 2015 |
| Nolan DeFranco; DE | Recruit ratings: Scout: Rivals: 247Sports: ESPN: (75) | | | | | |
| Myles Dorn; WR/DB/S | Charlotte, NC | Julius L. Chambers HS | 6 ft 2 in (1.88 m) | 195 lb (88 kg) | 4.58 | Dec 5, 2015 |
| Myles Dorn; WR/DB/S | Recruit ratings: Scout: Rivals: 247Sports: ESPN: (79) | | | | | |
| Marlon Dunlap; DT | Charlotte, NC | West Charlotte HS | 6 ft 4 in (1.93 m) | 290 lb (130 kg) | 5.24 | Oct 26, 2015 |
| Marlon Dunlap; DT | Recruit ratings: Scout: Rivals: 247Sports: ESPN: (75) | | | | | |
| Luke Elder; OG | LaGrange, GA | LaGrange HS | 6 ft 4 in (1.93 m) | 282 lb (128 kg) | 5.55 | Jun 21, 2015 |
| Luke Elder; OG | Recruit ratings: Scout: Rivals: 247Sports: ESPN: (78) | | | | | |
| D.J. Ford; S | Lineville, AL | Clay Central HS | 6 ft 3 in (1.91 m) | 190 lb (86 kg) | N/A | Jan 17, 2016 |
| D.J. Ford; S | Recruit ratings: Scout: Rivals: 247Sports: ESPN: (73) | | | | | |
| Tomon Fox; DE | Suwanee, GA | Collins Hill HS | 6 ft 3 in (1.91 m) | 232 lb (105 kg) | 4.88 | Jun 21, 2015 |
| Tomon Fox; DE | Recruit ratings: Scout: Rivals: 247Sports: ESPN: (82) | | | | | |
| Rontavius Groves; WR/CB | Nashville, TN | Pearl-Cohn HS | 5 ft 11 in (1.80 m) | 170 lb (77 kg) | 4.5 | Dec 6, 2015 |
| Rontavius Groves; WR/CB | Recruit ratings: Scout: Rivals: 247Sports: ESPN: (76) | | | | | |
| Tyrone Hopper; LB | Roswell, GA | Roswell HS | 6 ft 3 in (1.91 m) | 202 lb (92 kg) | 4.74 | Jun 16, 2015 |
| Tyrone Hopper; LB | Recruit ratings: Scout: Rivals: 247Sports: ESPN: (75) | | | | | |
| Roscoe Johnson; WR | Union, SC | Union County HS | 6 ft 1 in (1.85 m) | 173 lb (78 kg) | 4.5 | Jul 15, 2015 |
| Roscoe Johnson; WR | Recruit ratings: Scout: Rivals: 247Sports: ESPN: (77) | | | | | |
| Jay Jay McCargo; OT | Arlington, VA | Bishop O'Connell HS | 6 ft 4 in (1.93 m) | 283 lb (128 kg) | 5.4 | Apr 25, 2015 |
| Jay Jay McCargo; OT | Recruit ratings: Scout: Rivals: 247Sports: ESPN: (79) | | | | | |
| James Pierre^ S | Deerfield Beach, FL | Deerfield Beach HS | 6 ft 2 in (1.88 m) | 170 lb (77 kg) | 4.61 | May 19, 2015 |
| James Pierre^ S | Recruit ratings: Scout: Rivals: 247Sports: ESPN: (76) | | | | | |
| Tyler Pritchett; OG | Auburn, AL | Auburn HS | 6 ft 2 in (1.88 m) | 290 lb (130 kg) | 5.5 | Apr 14, 2015 |
| Tyler Pritchett; OG | Recruit ratings: Scout: Rivals: 247Sports: ESPN: (78) | | | | | |
| Patrice Rene; CB | Alexandria, VA | Episcopal HS | 6 ft 2 in (1.88 m) | 198 lb (90 kg) | 4.57 | Jan 20, 2016 |
| Patrice Rene; CB | Recruit ratings: Scout: Rivals: 247Sports: ESPN: (80) | | | | | |
| Gregory Ross; S | Oxon Hill, MD | Potomac HS | 6 ft 0 in (1.83 m) | 165 lb (75 kg) | 4.55 | May 23, 2015 |
| Gregory Ross; S | Recruit ratings: Scout: Rivals: 247Sports: ESPN: (74) | | | | | |
| Dominique Ross; LB | Jacksonville, FL | Trinity Christian Academy | 6 ft 3 in (1.91 m) | 203 lb (92 kg) | N/A | Jun 16, 2015 |
| Dominique Ross; LB | Recruit ratings: Scout: Rivals: 247Sports: ESPN: (77) | | | | | |
| K.J. Sails; S | Gibsonton, FL | East Bay HS | 5 ft 10 in (1.78 m) | 164 lb (74 kg) | 4.5 | Feb 3, 2016 |
| K.J. Sails; S | Recruit ratings: Scout: Rivals: 247Sports: ESPN: (74) | | | | | |
| Jonathan Smith; LB | Laurinburg, NC | Scotland HS | 6 ft 0 in (1.83 m) | 229 lb (104 kg) | 4.77 | Aug 17, 2015 |
| Jonathan Smith; LB | Recruit ratings: Scout: Rivals: 247Sports: ESPN: (76) | | | | | |
| Chazz Surratt; QB | Denver, NC | East Lincoln HS | 6 ft 3 in (1.91 m) | 203 lb (92 kg) | 4.5 | Jun 26, 2015 |
| Chazz Surratt; QB | Recruit ratings: Scout: Rivals: 247Sports: ESPN: (80) | | | | | |
| Noah Turner; TE | Mundelein, IL | Carmel Catholic HS | 6 ft 3 in (1.91 m) | 237 lb (108 kg) | 4.69 | Jul 3, 2015 |
| Noah Turner; TE | Recruit ratings: Scout: Rivals: 247Sports: ESPN: (75) | | | | | |
| Garrett Walston; TE | Wilmington, NC | New Hanover HS | 6 ft 4 in (1.93 m) | 230 lb (100 kg) | N/A | Oct 8, 2015 |
| Garrett Walston; TE | Recruit ratings: Scout: Rivals: 247Sports: ESPN: (79) | | | | | |
| Myles Wolfolk; CB | Upper Marlboro, MD | Dr. Henry A. Wise, Jr HS | 6 ft 0 in (1.83 m) | 186 lb (84 kg) | 4.5 | Nov 29, 2015 |
| Myles Wolfolk; CB | Recruit ratings: Scout: Rivals: 247Sports: ESPN: (74) | | | | | |
Overall recruit ranking: Scout: 25 Rivals: 25 247Sports: 36 ESPN: 34
‡ Refers to 40-yard dash; Note: In many cases, Scout, Rivals, 247Sports, On3, and ESPN may conflict in their listings of height, weight and 40 time.; In these cases, the average was taken. ESPN grades are on a 100-point scale.; Sources: "North Carolina Football Commitment List (19)". Rivals.; "2016 North Carolina Football Recruiting Commits". Scout.; "North Carolina Tar Heels 2016 Player Commits". ESPN.; "Scout.com Team Recruiting Rankings". Scout.; "2016 Team Ranking". Rivals.com.; "North Carolina 2016 Football Commits". 247Sports.

^These signees will not be enrolling at UNC in 2016 due to not being admitted into the school.

== Schedule ==
| Date | Time | Opponent | Rank | Site | TV | Result | Attendance |
|---|---|---|---|---|---|---|---|
| September 3 | 5:30 p.m. | vs. No. 18 Georgia* | No. 22 | Georgia Dome; Atlanta, GA (Chick-fil-A Kickoff Game) | ESPN | L 24–33 | 75,405 |
| September 10 | 7:30 p.m. | at Illinois* | | Memorial Stadium; Champaign, IL | BTN | W 48–23 | 60,670 |
| September 17 | 3:30 p.m. | No. 11 (FCS) James Madison* | | Kenan Memorial Stadium; Chapel Hill, NC | ACCRSN | W 56–28 | 56,000 |
| September 24 | 3:30 p.m. | Pittsburgh | | Kenan Memorial Stadium; Chapel Hill, NC | ESPNU | W 37–36 | 54,500 |
| October 1 | 3:30 p.m. | at No. 12 Florida State | | Doak Campbell Stadium; Tallahassee, FL | ESPN | W 37–35 | 77,584 |
| October 8 | 3:30 p.m. | No. 25 Virginia Tech | No. 17 | Kenan Memorial Stadium; Chapel Hill, NC | ABC/ESPN2 | L 3–34 | 33,000 |
| October 15 | 3:30 p.m. | at No. 16 Miami (FL) | | Hard Rock Stadium; Miami Gardens, FL | ABC/ESPN2 | W 20–13 | 58,731 |
| October 22 | 3:00 p.m. | at Virginia | No. 22 | Scott Stadium; Charlottesville, VA (South's Oldest Rivalry) | ACCRSN | W 35–14 | 40,882 |
| November 5 | 12:30 p.m. | Georgia Tech^{†} | No. 21 | Kenan Memorial Stadium; Chapel Hill, NC | ACCN | W 48–20 | 58,000 |
| November 10 | 7:30 p.m. | at Duke | No. 17 | Wallace Wade Stadium; Durham, NC (Victory Bell) | ESPN | L 27–28 | 39,212 |
| November 19 | 3:30 p.m. | No. 5 (FCS) The Citadel* | | Kenan Memorial Stadium; Chapel Hill, NC | ACCN+ | W 41–7 | 41,000 |
| November 25 | 12:00 p.m. | NC State | | Kenan Memorial Stadium; Chapel Hill, NC (rivalry) | ESPN | L 21–28 | 59,000 |
| December 30 | 2:00 p.m. | vs. No. 18 Stanford* | | Sun Bowl; El Paso, TX (Sun Bowl) | CBS | L 23–25 | 42,166 |
*Non-conference game; ^{†}Homecoming; Rankings from AP Poll and CFP Rankings after November 1 released prior to game; All times are in Eastern time

== Personnel ==
North Carolina head coach Larry Fedora enters his fifth year as the North Carolina's head coach for the 2016 season. At the end of the 2015 season, assistant head coach, Seth Littrell, was hired as the head coach at North Texas. As a result, co-offensive coordinator and offensive line coach, Chris Kapilovic, was promoted to offensive coordinator, and will retain his role as offensive line coach. Former Tar Heel player, Chad Scott, was hired to replace Littrell as the tight ends/hybrids coach.

=== Roster ===
2016 North Carolina Tar Heels football team roster
Players
Coaches
Offense

| Pos. | # | Name | Class |
|---|---|---|---|
| QB | 10 | Mitchell Trubisky | Jr |
| QB | 11 | Nathan Elliott | Fr |
| QB | 12 | Chazz Surratt | Fr |
| QB | 14 | Logan Byrd | Fr |
| QB | 16 | Manny Miles | Fr |
| RB | 1 | Khris Francis | Sr |
| RB | 2 | Jordon Brown | Fr |
| RB | 8 | T. J. Logan | Sr |
| RB | 27 | Darius Graves | So |
| RB | 32 | Jacob Schmidt | So |
| RB | 33 | Antonio James | So |
| RB | 34 | Elijah Hood | Jr |
| RB | 38 | David Smith Jr. | So |
| FB | 47 | Don Mastromatteo | Sr |
| WR | 3 | Ryan Switzer | Sr |
| WR | 4 | Rontavius Groves | Fr |
| WR | 5 | Juval Mollette | Fr |
| WR | 7 | Austin Proehl | Jr |
| WR | 9 | Roscoe Johnson | Fr |
| WR | 13 | Mack Hollins | Sr |
| WR | 15 | Jordan Cunningham | Jr |
| WR | 17 | Anthony Ratliff-Williams | Fr |
| WR | 18 | Josh Cabrera | So |
| WR | 21 | Devin Perry | So |
| WR | 28 | Dante DiMaggio | So |
| WR | 48 | Thomas Jackson | Jr |
| WR | 81 | Hunter Smith | So |
| WR | 84 | Bug Howard | Sr |
| TE | 80 | Jake Bargas | Fr |
| TE | 82 | Brandon Fritts | So |
| TE | 83 | Garrett Walston | Fr |
| TE | 86 | Carl Tucker | Fr |
| TE | 87 | Noah Turner | Fr |
| TE | 89 | Jared Worley | Fr |
| OT | 51 | William Sweet | Fr |
| OT | 67 | Charlie Heck | Fr |
| OT | 71 | Jon Heck | Sr |
| OT | 75 | Bentley Spain | Jr |
| OT | 76 | R. J. Prince | Jr |
| OT | 77 | John Ferranto | Sr |
| G | 70 | Caleb Peterson | Sr |
| G | 72 | Mason Veal | Fr |
| G | 73 | Brad Henson | Jr |
| C | 52 | Tommy Hatton | Fr |
| OL | 55 | Jay-Jay McCargo | Fr |
| OL | 57 | Tyler Pritchett | Fr |
| OL | 58 | Nick Polino | Fr |
| OL | 62 | Mark Uptegraff | Jr |
| OL | 69 | Jonathan Trull | Jr |
| OL | 78 | Layton Barber | Fr |
| OL | 79 | Luke Elder | Fr |
| C | 68 | Lucas Crowley | Sr |

Defense

| Pos. | # | Name | Class |
|---|---|---|---|
| CB | 2 | Des Lawrence | Sr |
| CB | 6 | M. J. Stewart | Jr |
| CB | 18 | Corey Bell Jr. | So |
| S | 15 | Donnie Miles | Jr |
| S | 16 | Stephen Albright | Fr |
| S | 26 | Dominquie Green | Sr |
| S | 27 | Jaye Stackhouse | Fr |
| S | 29 | J. K. Britt | So |
| S | 31 | Cameron Albright | So |
| DB | 5 | Patrice Rene | Fr |
| DB | 8 | Greg Ross | Fr |
| DB | 9 | K. J. Sails | Fr |
| DB | 11 | Myles Wolfolk | Fr |
| DB | 13 | Jesse Cuccia | So |
| DB | 16 | D. J. Ford | Fr |
| DB | 19 | Robert Morgan | Jr |
| DB | 20 | Thomas Brown | So |
| DB | 21 | Myles Dorn | Fr |
| DB | 24 | Zach Goins | So |
| DB | 28 | Simeon Gatling | Fr |
| DB | 35 | Chris Ripberger | Jr |
| DB | 48 | Robert James | So |
| LB | 4 | Allen Artis | Jr |
| LB | 7 | Jonathan Smith | Fr |
| LB | 10 | Andre Smith | So |
| LB | 20 | Dominique Ross | Fr |
| LB | 23 | Cayson Collins | Jr |
| LB | 25 | Ayden Bonilla | So |
| LB | 30 | Hunter Crafford | Jr |
| LB | 36 | Cole Holcomb | So |
| LB | 38 | Keith Beasley Jr. | So |
| LB | 41 | J. B. Copeland | Jr |
| LB | 42 | Tyrone Hopper | Fr |
| LB | 44 | Sam Blobe | So |
| LB | 52 | Kemmi Pettway | Jr |
| LB | 54 | Johnathon Sutton | Fr |
| LB | 57 | Marlon Petty | Jr |
| DE | 12 | Tomon Fox | Fr |
| DE | 17 | Dajuan Drennon | Jr |
| DE | 33 | Allen Cater | Fr |
| DE | 45 | Mikey Bart | Sr |
| DE | 53 | Malik Carney | So |
| DE | 55 | Jason Strowbridge | Fr |
| DE | 58 | Josh Strickland | So |
| DE | 91 | Nolan DeFranco | Fr |
| DE | 96 | Matt Gampe | So |
| DE | 98 | Connor Barringer | Jr |
| DT | 49 | Jeremiah Clarke | So |
| DT | 90 | Nazair Jones | Jr |
| DT | 92 | Aaron Crawford | Fr |
| DT | 93 | Robert Dinkins | So |
| DT | 94 | Marlon Dunlap | Fr |
| DT | 97 | Jalen Dalton | So |
| DL | 95 | Tyler Powell | Jr |

Special teams

| Pos. | # | Name | Class |
|---|---|---|---|
| K | 24 | Nick Weiler | Sr |
| K | 90 | Connor Albrecht | So |
| K | 95 | Tolson Jeffrey | So |
| K | 98 | Freeman Jones | So |
| P | 14 | Joey Mangili | Sr |
| P | 39 | Tom Shelton | Fr |
| P | 91 | Hunter Lent | So |
| LS | 41 | Kyle Murphy | Jr |
| LS | 61 | Tommy Bancroft | So |

Head coach

- Larry Fedora

Coordinators/assistant coaches

- Gunter Brewer (OC/WR)
- Gene Chizik (DC)
- Keith Heckendorf (QB)
- Lou Hernandez (Str+Cond)
- Chris Kapilovic (OC/OL)
- John Papuchis (LB)
- Chad Scott (TE)
- Tray Scott (DL)
- Charlton Warren (DB)

Legend

- (C) Team captain
- (S) Suspended
- (I) Ineligible
- Injured
- Redshirt

Roster

== Game summaries ==
=== Vs. Georgia ===
| | 1 | 2 | 3 | 4 | Total |
|---|---|---|---|---|---|
| #22 Tar Heels | 0 | 10 | 14 | 0 | 24 |
| #18 Bulldogs | 7 | 7 | 9 | 10 | 33 |

=== At Illinois ===
| | 1 | 2 | 3 | 4 | Total |
|---|---|---|---|---|---|
| Tar Heels | 17 | 7 | 7 | 17 | 48 |
| Fighting Illini | 14 | 2 | 0 | 7 | 23 |

=== James Madison ===
| | 1 | 2 | 3 | 4 | Total |
|---|---|---|---|---|---|
| #11 (FCS) Dukes | 21 | 0 | 7 | 0 | 28 |
| Tar Heels | 14 | 21 | 14 | 7 | 56 |

=== Pittsburgh ===
| | 1 | 2 | 3 | 4 | Total |
|---|---|---|---|---|---|
| Panthers | 5 | 14 | 14 | 3 | 36 |
| Tar Heels | 0 | 16 | 7 | 14 | 37 |

=== At Florida State ===
| | 1 | 2 | 3 | 4 | Total |
|---|---|---|---|---|---|
| Tar Heels | 7 | 14 | 7 | 9 | 37 |
| #12 Seminoles | 0 | 7 | 7 | 21 | 35 |

=== Virginia Tech ===
| | 1 | 2 | 3 | 4 | Total |
|---|---|---|---|---|---|
| #25 Hokies | 6 | 7 | 14 | 7 | 34 |
| #17 Tar Heels | 0 | 3 | 0 | 0 | 3 |

=== At Miami (FL) ===
| | 1 | 2 | 3 | 4 | Total |
|---|---|---|---|---|---|
| Tar Heels | 10 | 10 | 0 | 0 | 20 |
| #16 Hurricanes | 0 | 3 | 7 | 3 | 13 |

=== At Virginia ===
| | 1 | 2 | 3 | 4 | Total |
|---|---|---|---|---|---|
| #22 Tar Heels | 7 | 7 | 14 | 7 | 35 |
| Cavaliers | 0 | 7 | 0 | 7 | 14 |

=== Georgia Tech ===
| | 1 | 2 | 3 | 4 | Total |
|---|---|---|---|---|---|
| Yellow Jackets | 7 | 10 | 3 | 0 | 20 |
| #18 Tar Heels | 17 | 10 | 14 | 7 | 48 |

=== At Duke ===
| | 1 | 2 | 3 | 4 | Total |
|---|---|---|---|---|---|
| #15 Tar Heels | 14 | 7 | 6 | 0 | 27 |
| Blue Devils | 0 | 21 | 7 | 0 | 28 |

=== The Citadel ===
| | 1 | 2 | 3 | 4 | Total |
|---|---|---|---|---|---|
| #5 (FCS) Bulldogs | 0 | 0 | 0 | 7 | 7 |
| Tar Heels | 14 | 17 | 10 | 0 | 41 |

=== NC State ===
| | 1 | 2 | 3 | 4 | Total |
|---|---|---|---|---|---|
| Wolfpack | 14 | 7 | 7 | 0 | 28 |
| Tar Heels | 0 | 7 | 0 | 14 | 21 |

=== Stanford–Sun Bowl ===
| | 1 | 2 | 3 | 4 | Total |
|---|---|---|---|---|---|
| #16 Cardinal | 7 | 6 | 3 | 9 | 25 |
| Tar Heels | 7 | 0 | 10 | 6 | 23 |

== Rankings ==
Ranking movements Legend: ██ Increase in ranking ██ Decrease in ranking — = Not ranked RV = Received votes
| | Week | | | | | | | | | | | | | | | |
| Poll | Pre | 1 | 2 | 3 | 4 | 5 | 6 | 7 | 8 | 9 | 10 | 11 | 12 | 13 | 14 | Final |
|---|---|---|---|---|---|---|---|---|---|---|---|---|---|---|---|---|
| AP | 22 | RV | RV | RV | RV | 17 | RV | 22 | 21 | 18 | 15 | RV | RV | — | — | RV |
| Coaches | 20 | RV | RV | RV | 23 | 16 | RV | 21 | 20 | 17 | 13 | 24 | 25 | RV | RV | — |
| CFP | Not released | | | | | | | | | 21 | 17 | — | — | — | — | Not released |
