= Solomon Thomas =

American football player (born 1995)

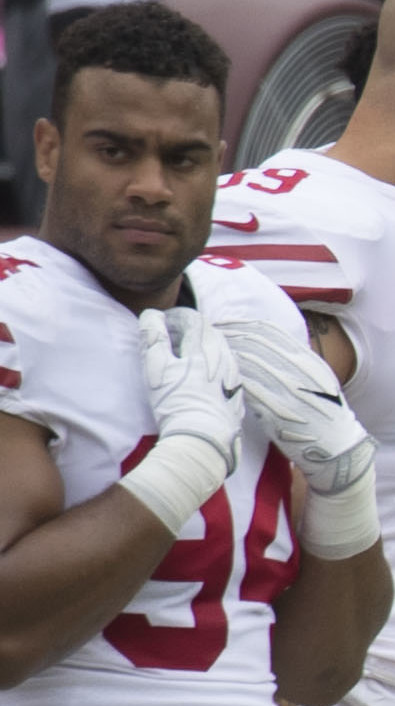
- Thomas with San Francisco 49ers in 2017

No. 90 – Tennessee Titans
- Position: Defensive tackle
- Roster status: Active

Personal information
- Born: August 26, 1995 (age 31); Chicago, Illinois, U.S.
- Listed height: 6 ft 2 in (1.88 m)
- Listed weight: 285 lb (129 kg)

Career information
- High school: Coppell (Coppell, Texas)
- College: Stanford (2014–2016)
- NFL draft: 2017: 1st round, 3rd overall pick

Career history
- San Francisco 49ers (2017–2020); Las Vegas Raiders (2021); New York Jets (2022–2024); Dallas Cowboys (2025); Tennessee Titans (2026–present)

Awards and highlights
- 2016 Sun Bowl (MVP); Morris Trophy (2016); Third-team All-American (2016); First-team All-Pac-12 (2016)

Career NFL statistics as of Week 5, 2026
- Total tackles: 249
- Sacks: 18.5
- Forced fumbles: 3
- Fumble recoveries: 2
- Pass deflections: 6
- Stats at Pro Football Reference

Solomon Christopher Thomas (born August 26, 1995) is an American professional football defensive tackle for the Tennessee Titans of the National Football League (NFL). He played college football for the Stanford Cardinal and was selected third overall by the San Francisco 49ers in the 2017 NFL draft. Thomas has also played for the Las Vegas Raiders, New York Jets, and Dallas Cowboys.

== Early life ==
Thomas was born in Chicago, Illinois, on August 26, 1995. Thomas and his family moved to Sydney, Australia when he was two years old, where he lived for five years. He attended Coppell High School in Coppell, Texas. He had 78 tackles and 12.5 sacks as a senior and 89 tackles with 8.5 sacks as a junior. Thomas was rated as a four-star recruit and was ranked among the top players in his class. He committed to Stanford University to play college football.

== College career ==
After redshirting his first year with the Stanford Cardinal in 2014, Thomas played in all 14 games in 2015, starting six, and had 39 total tackles, 10.5 tackles-for-loss, and 3.5 sacks. In recognition of his successful 2015 season, he was named as an honorable mention All-Pac-12 Conference selection. In 2016, Thomas played and started all 13 games and had 62 total tackles with 15.0 tackles-for-loss and 8.0 sacks. Thomas was named first team All-Pac-12 and won the Morris Trophy. Following the 2016 season, Thomas declared his intentions to enter the 2017 NFL draft.

== Professional career ==
=== Pre-draft ===
Coming out of Stanford, Thomas was projected to be a first round pick by the majority of analysts and scouts. He was invited to the NFL Scouting Combine, but only chose to participate in the bench press, 40-yard dash, vertical jump, and broad jump. On March 23, 2017, Thomas attended Stanford's pro day, but opted to stand on his combine numbers and only performed positional drills. He was ranked the second best defensive end (behind Myles Garrett) by NFLDraftScout.com, ESPN, and Sports Illustrated.

Pre-draft measurables
Height	Weight	Arm length	Hand span	Wingspan	40-yard dash	10-yard split	20-yard split	20-yard shuttle	Three-cone drill	Vertical jump	Broad jump	Bench press
6 ft 2 5/8 in (1.90 m)	273 lb (124 kg)	33 in (0.84 m)	9 3/8 in (0.24 m)	6 ft 6 7/8 in (2.00 m)	4.69 s	1.66 s	2.76 s	4.28 s	6.95 s	35.0 in (0.89 m)	10 ft 6 in (3.20 m)	30 reps
All values from NFL Combine

=== San Francisco 49ers ===
Thomas was drafted third overall by the San Francisco 49ers in the 2017 NFL Draft. He became the third consecutive defensive end drafted in the first round by the 49ers, joining Arik Armstead (2015) and DeForest Buckner (2016). The man who drafted Thomas—newly appointed 49ers general manager John Lynch—coincidentally studied alongside Thomas as a mature student while working as a broadcaster for FOX Sports, and counselled Thomas to leave Stanford without knowing he would be in a position to draft him as a member of the 49ers front office the following season.

On July 28, 2017, the 49ers signed Thomas to a fully guaranteed four-year, $28.14 million contract that included a signing bonus of $18.61 million. He played in 14 games as a rookie with 12 starts, recording 41 tackles and three sacks.

On May 1, 2020, the 49ers declined the fifth-year option on Thomas' contract, making him a free agent in 2021. During the 49ers' Week 2 matchup against the New York Jets, Thomas suffered a torn ACL and was ruled out for the rest of the season.

=== Las Vegas Raiders ===
Thomas signed a one-year contract with the Las Vegas Raiders on March 19, 2021. He played in all 17 games, recording 34 tackles, 3.5 sacks, and two forced fumbles.

=== New York Jets ===
On March 30, 2022, Thomas signed with the Jets. He was named a backup defensive tackle behind Quinnen Williams, Sheldon Rankins, and Nathan Shepherd. He played in all 17 games, recording 26 tackles, while playing 33% of snaps.

Thomas re-signed with the Jets on March 18, 2023. He played in 17 games with three starts, recording a career-high five sacks.

Thomas re-signed with the Jets again on March 21, 2024. He finished the 2024 season with 3.5 sacks, 26 tackles, two passes defended, one forced fumble, and one fumble recovery.

=== Dallas Cowboys ===
On March 12, 2025, Thomas signed a two-year, $8 million contract with the Dallas Cowboys. He reunited with defensive line coach Aaron Whitecotton. He appeared in all 16 games, with two starts. He registered 33 tackles (3 for loss), 12 quarterback pressures and one pass defensed. He was the Cowboys' Walter Payton Man of the Year club winner for his strong impact off the field in the community.

=== Tennessee Titans ===
On March 11, 2026, Thomas was traded to the Tennessee Titans in exchange for a 2026 seventh-round draft pick. He reunited with head coach Robert Saleh.

== Career statistics ==
=== NFL ===
Legend
**Bold**	Career high

==== Regular season ====
Year	Team	Games		Tackles				Fumbles				Interceptions					
Year	Team	GP	GS	Comb	Solo	Ast	Sacks	FF	FR	Yds	TD	Int	Yds	Avg	Lng	TD	PD
2017	SF	14	12	**41**	**34**	7	3.0	0	**1**	0	0	0	0	0	0	0	0
2018	SF	16	**13**	31	24	7	1.0	0	0	0	0	0	0	0	0	0	0
2019	SF	16	3	21	15	6	2.0	0	0	0	0	0	0	0	0	0	0
2020	SF	2	2	2	0	2	0.0	0	0	0	0	0	0	0	0	0	0
2021	LVR	**17**	0	34	17	**17**	3.5	**2**	0	0	0	0	0	0	0	0	**2**
2022	NYJ	**17**	0	26	13	13	0.5	0	0	0	0	0	0	0	0	0	0
2023	NYJ	**17**	3	31	15	16	**5.0**	0	0	0	0	0	0	0	0	0	1
2024	NYJ	16	1	26	15	11	3.5	1	1	0	0	0	0	0	0	0	**2**
2025	DAL	16	2	27	10	17	0.0	0	0	0	0	0	0	0	0	0	1
2026	TEN	5	0	10	2	8	0.0	0	0	0	0	0	0	0	0	0	0
Career		136	36	249	145	104	18.5	3	2	0	0	0	0	0	0	0	6

==== Postseason ====
Year	Team	Games		Tackles				Fumbles				Interceptions					
Year	Team	GP	GS	Comb	Solo	Ast	Sacks	FF	FR	Yds	TD	Int	Yds	Avg	Lng	TD	PD
2019	SF	**3**	0	**4**	**4**	0	**1.0**	0	0	0	0	0	0	0	0	0	0
2021	LVR	1	0	1	1	0	0.0	0	0	0	0	0	0	0	0	0	0
Career		4	0	5	5	0	1.0	0	0	0	0	0	0	0	0	0	0

=== College ===
College statistics
Season	Games	Tackles	TFL	Sack	FF
2015	14	39	10.5	3.5	0
2016	13	62	15.0	8	1
Career	27	101	25.5	11.5	1

== Personal life ==
Thomas' older sister died by suicide in 2018 at the age of 24. He founded "The Defensive Line", a nonprofit organization aiming to reduce youth suicide.
