= 2016 Utah Utes football team =

American college football season

2016 Utah Utes football

Foster Farms Bowl champion

Foster Farms Bowl, W 26–24 vs. Indiana
- Conference: Pac-12 Conference
- South Division

Ranking
- Coaches: No. 21
- AP: No. 23
- Record: 9–4 (5–4 Pac-12)
- Head coach: Kyle Whittingham (12th season)
- Co-offensive coordinators: Aaron Roderick (3rd season); Jim Harding (2nd season)
- Offensive scheme: Multiple
- Defensive coordinator: Morgan Scalley (1st season)
- Base defense: 4–3
- Home stadium: Rice-Eccles Stadium

2016 Pac-12 Conference football standings
	Conf.			Overall
Team	W		L	W		L
North Division
No. 4 Washington xy$^	8	–	1	12	–	2
Washington State	7	–	2	8	–	5
No. 12 Stanford	6	–	3	10	–	3
California	3	–	6	5	–	7
Oregon State	3	–	6	4	–	8
Oregon	2	–	7	4	–	8
South Division
No. 17 Colorado xy	8	–	1	10	–	4
No. 3 USC	7	–	2	10	–	3
No. 23 Utah	5	–	4	9	–	4
Arizona State	2	–	7	5	–	7
UCLA	2	–	7	4	–	8
Arizona	1	–	8	3	–	9
Championship: Washington 41, Colorado 10
^ – College Football Playoff participant; $ – Conference champion; x – Division champion/co-champions; y – Championship game participant; Rankings from AP Poll

The 2016 Utah Utes football team represented the University of Utah during the 2016 NCAA Division I FBS football season. The team was coached by twelfth year head coach Kyle Whittingham and played their home games in Rice-Eccles Stadium in Salt Lake City, Utah. They were members of the South Division of the Pac-12 Conference. They finished the season 9–4, 5–4 in Pac-12 play to finish in third place in the South Division. They were invited to the Foster Farms where they defeated Indiana.

== Schedule ==
Date	Time	Opponent	Rank	Site	TV	Result	Attendance
September 1	6:00 p.m.	Southern Utah*		Rice-Eccles Stadium; Salt Lake City, UT	P12N	W 24–0	45,945
September 10	5:30 p.m.	BYU*		Rice-Eccles Stadium; Salt Lake City, UT (Holy War/Beehive Boot)	FOX	W 20–19	46,915
September 17	8:30 p.m.	at San Jose State*		CEFCU Stadium; San Jose, CA	CBSSN	W 34–17	16,041
September 23	7:30 p.m.	USC	No. 24	Rice-Eccles Stadium; Salt Lake City, UT	FS1	W 31–27	46,133
October 1	4:00 p.m.	at California	No. 18	California Memorial Stadium; Berkeley, CA	P12N	L 23–28	46,618
October 8	8:00 p.m.	Arizona^{†}	No. 24	Rice-Eccles Stadium; Salt Lake City, UT	FS1	W 36–23	45,917
October 15	2:00 p.m.	at Oregon State	No. 21	Reser Stadium; Corvallis, OR	P12N	W 19–14	32,093
October 22	2:00 p.m.	at UCLA	No. 19	Rose Bowl; Pasadena, CA	FOX	W 52–45	66,243
October 29	1:30 p.m.	No. 4 Washington	No. 17	Rice-Eccles Stadium; Salt Lake City, UT (College GameDay)	FS1	L 24–31	47,801
November 10	7:30 p.m.	at Arizona State	No. 15	Sun Devil Stadium; Tempe, AZ	FS1	W 49–26	48,220
November 19	3:00 p.m.	Oregon	No. 12	Rice-Eccles Stadium; Salt Lake City, UT	P12N	L 28–30	46,327
November 26	5:30 p.m.	at No. 9 Colorado	No. 22	Folsom Field; Boulder, CO (Rumble in the Rockies)	FOX	L 22–27	52,301
December 28	6:30 p.m.	vs. Indiana*	No. 19	Levi's Stadium; Santa Clara, CA (Foster Farms Bowl)	FOX	W 26–24	27,608
*Non-conference game; ^{†}Homecoming; Rankings from AP Poll and CFP Rankings after November 1 released prior to game; All times are in Mountain time

== Roster ==
2016 Utah Utes Football
Quarterback: 1 Tyler Huntley – freshman (6'1, 190); 3 Troy Williams – junior (6'2, 200); 12 A.J. Cecil – sophomore (6'1, 190); 14 Andrew Lisk – freshman (6'1, 202); 15 Logan Bateman – (redshirt) freshman (6'1, 190); Tailback: 2 Zack Moss – freshman (5'10, 206); 4 Troy McCormick – (redshirt) junior (5'9, 178); 7 Devonta'e Henry-Cole – freshman (5'8, 168); 23 Armand Shyne – sophomore (5'11, 214); 27 Marcel Manalo – (redshirt) freshman (5'11, 220); 28 Joe Williams – senior (5'11, 205); 30 James Gray – sophomore (5'9, 174); 32 Ty Murrell – freshman (5'8, 175); 35 Jordan Howard – (redshirt) freshman (5'10, 209); Mason Woodward – sophomore (5'9, 211); Quinn Meier – freshman (5'11, 175); Wide receiver: 6 Kyle Fulks – (redshirt) junior (5'9, 178); 8 Alec Dana – sophomore (6'2, 186); 10 Riley Richmond – sophomore (5'7, 169); 11 Raelon Singleton – (redshirt) sophomore (6'3, 210); 12 Tim Patrick – senior (6'2, 210); 13 Monte Seabrook – junior (5'11, 184); 16 Cory Butler-Byrd – senior (5'10, 180); 17 Demari Simpkins – freshman (5'10, 184); 19 Tyler Cooperwood – senior (5'9, 163); 20 Lahi Kautai – sophomore (5'8, 195); 21 Tyrone Smith – sophomore (6'4, 205); 24 Kenric Young – junior (6'1, 189); 26 Terrell Burgess – freshman (6'0, 182); 29 Gage Cook – (redshirt) freshman (5'11, 192); 47 Caleb Repp – sophomore (6'5, 210); 80 Siaosi Mariner – (redshirt) freshman (6'5, 195); 81 Dimitri Salido – senior (6'0, 195); 83 Jameson Field – (redshirt) sophomore (5'11, 185); 84 Dakota Baker – freshman (6'2, 175); 85 Andrew Santiago – (redshirt) senior (6'0, 195); Tight end: 13 Bapa Falemaka – freshman (6'3, 239); 18 Evan Moeai – (redshirt) senior (6'2, 230); 46 Tyler Bell – (redshirt) junior (6'4, 231); 82 Ken Hampel – (redshirt) senior (6'3, 250); 86 Wallace Gonzalez – (redshirt) sophomore (6'5, 255); 87 Siale Fakailoatonga – senior (6'4, 255); 88 Harrison Handley – (redshirt) junior (6'5, 250); 89 Chad Hekking – freshman (6'4, 240); 95 Trace Hobbs – freshman	Offensive lineman: 52 Sam Tevi – senior (6'6, 305); 53 Tucker Scott – freshman (6'4, 288); 54 Isaac Asiata – (redshirt) senior (6'3, 323); 62 Aaron Amaana – sophomore (6'1, 332); 65 Paul Toala – sophomore (6'4, 324); 66 Kyle Lanterman – (redshirt) freshman (6'2, 280); 67 Nick Carman – (redshirt) freshman (6'3, 290); 68 J. J. Dielman – (redshirt) senior (6'5, 300); 69 Lo Falemaka – (redshirt) junior (6'5, 300); 70 Jackson Barton – (redshirt) sophomore (6'7, 310); 71 Daniel Heller – (redshirt) freshman (6'2, 290); 72 Garett Bolles – junior (6'6, 296); 73 Johnny Capra – (redshirt) freshman (6'6, 300); 74 Salesi Uhatafe – (redshirt) junior (6'5, 315); 75 Nick Nowakowski – (redshirt) senior (6'1, 295); 76 Scott Peck – freshman (6'6, 310); 77 Darrin Paulo – (redshirt) freshman (6'5, 310); 78 Jake Grant – freshman (6'3, 290); 79 Keven Dixon – (redshirt) freshman (6'5, 277); Defensive tackle: 41 Hauati Pututau – freshman (6'4, 265); 45 Filipo Mokofisi – (redshirt) junior (6'3, 278); 53 Alani Havili-Katoa – (redshirt) sophomore (6'3, 290); 58 Vaha Vainuku – (redshirt) freshman (6'3, 290); 59 Pasoni Tasini – senior (6'3, 295); 64 Mark Kruger – freshman (6'2, 295); 90 Pitta Tonga – freshman (6'3, 250); 93 Lowell Lotulelei – junior (6'2, 310); 99 Leki Fotu – freshman (6'5, 276); Defensive end: 8 Chris Hart – (redshirt) freshman (6'2, 245); 11 Kylie Fitts – (redshirt) senior (6'3, 295); 40 Kendall Huey – junior (6'3, 295); 49 Hunter Dimick – (redshirt) senior (6'3, 295); 50 Pita Taumoepenu – senior (6'3, 295); 52 Hayden Clegg – (redshirt) senior (6'3, 295); 56 Bradlee Anae – freshman (6'3, 229); 92 Maxs Tupai – freshman (6'2, 245); 96 Nick Heninger – freshman (6'2, 229); Trevor Horlacher – freshman; Punter: 33 Mitch Wishnowsky – sophomore (6'2, 220)	Linebacker: 3 Donavan Thompson – freshman (5'10, 214); 9 Davir Hamilton – freshman (6'3, 208); 10 Sunia Tauteoli – junior (6'0, 220); 30 Cody Barton – sophomore (6'2, 232); 31 Evan Eggiman – (redshirt) junior (6'2, 215); 32 Sharrieff Shah Jr. – (redshirt) senior (6'1, 225); 34 Alex Whittingham – (redshirt) junior (5'10, 208); 37 Christian Drews – junior (6'1, 230); 38 Sam Whittingham – (redshirt) freshman (5'10, 210); 42 Marcus Sanders-Williams – senior (5'11, 236); 44 Jake Jackson – (redshirt) freshman (6'3, 230); 48 Gerrit Choate – freshman (5'11, 225); 55 David Luafatasaga – freshman (6'4, 232); 57 Justin Tatola – (redshirt) freshman (5'11, 211); Defensive back: 1 Boobie Hobbs – junior (5'10, 180); 2 Philip Afia – (redshirt) freshman (6'1, 195); 5 Tavaris Williams – (redshirt) sophomore (5'11, 185); 6 Tyson Cisrow – (redshirt) freshman (5'10, 190); 7 Andre Godfrey – junior (5'10, 191); 10 Jason Thompson – (redshirt) senior (6'2, 208); 12 Justin Thomas – (redshirt) senior (5'8, 180); 13 Jordan Fogal – junior (5'10, 186); 14 Brian Allen – (redshirt) senior (6'3, 205); 15 Dominique Hatfield – senior (5'10, 175); 17 Conner Charles – (redshirt) freshman (5'11, 175); 18 Nygel King – freshman (6'0, 169); 20 Marcus Williams – junior (6'1, 195); 22 Chase Hansen – (redshirt) sophomore (6'3, 212) (+QB); 23 Julian Blackmon – freshman (6'1, 180); 25 Casey Hughes – (redshirt) sophomore (5'11, 195); 27 Nick Mika – sophomore (6'2, 190); 29 Reginald Porter – (redshirt) senior (5'11, 185); 33 Damian Greene – (redshirt) junior (5'8, 182); 35 Samson Nacua – freshman (6'3, 182); 36 MacKay Dunn – sophomore (5'10, 172); 43 Tyson Doman – freshman (6'0, 192); 46 Connor Haller – freshman; Duressa Goesse – sophomore; Kicker: 39 Andy Phillips – (redshirt) senior (5'10, 210); 63 John Aloma – freshman; 92 Hayes Hicken – (redshirt) freshman (5'11, 185); Long snappers: 94 Chase Dominguez – senior (6'5, 240)

== Rankings ==
Ranking movements Legend: ██ Increase in ranking ██ Decrease in ranking RV = Received votes
	Week															
Poll	Pre	1	2	3	4	5	6	7	8	9	10	11	12	13	14	Final
AP	RV	RV	RV	24	18	24	21	19	17	16	13	11	21	RV	RV	23
Coaches	RV	RV	RV	23	18	24	21	18	16	16	12	11	20	24	23	21
CFP	Not released									16	15	12	22	20	19	Not released

== Game summaries ==
=== Southern Utah ===
Southern Utah at Utah

Team	1	2	3	4	Total
Thunderbirds	0	0	0	0	0
• Utes	3	14	0	7	24

- Date: September 1
- Location: Rice-Eccles Stadium
  Salt Lake City, UT
- Game start: 6:07 MDT
- Elapsed time: 3:06
- Game attendance: 45,945
- Game weather: 80 °F (27 °C), Partly cloudy, winds S 11 mph
- Referee: Land Clark • Umpire: Matt Jordan • Linesman: Bob Day • Line judge: Jeff Robinson • Back judge: Justin Nelson • Field judge: John Morton • Side judge: Bernie Hulscher • Center judge: John Love
- TV announcers (P12): Roxy Bernstein, Anthony Herron, Lewis Johnson

Scoring summary

Quarter	Time	Drive			Team	Scoring information	Score	
Quarter	Time	Plays	Yards	TOP	Team	Scoring information	SUU	Utah
1	10:38	9	67	4:22	Utah	26-yard field goal by Andy Phillips	0	3
2	3:41	9	53	4:49	Utah	Troy McCormick 4-yard touchdown run, Andy Phillips kick good	0	10
2	1:11	4	37	1:00	Utah	Tim Patrick 2-yard touchdown reception from Troy Williams, Andy Phillips kick good	0	17
4	9:27	2	57	0:37	Utah	Tim Patrick 57-yard touchdown reception from Troy Williams, Andy Phillips kick good	0	24
"TOP" = time of possession. For other American football terms, see Glossary of American football.							0	24

Game Stats:

- Passing: SUU: McCoy Hill 6-12-0--42, Tannon Pedersen 0-6-1--0; Utah: Troy Williams 20-35-0--272, Tyler Huntley 3-4-0--26.
- Rushing: SUU: Malik Brown 10-49, Ty Rutledge 1-33, Hill 8-26, Raysean Pringle 5-13, James Felila 3-9, Isaiah Diego-Wi 1-0, Pedersen 4-(-14); Utah: Troy McCormick 12-55, Joe Williams 12-49, Armand Shyne 8-19, T. Williams 5-15.
- Receiving: SUU: Mike Sharp 1-14, Steven Wroblews 1-12, Rutledge 1-9, Logan Parker 1-6, Felila 1-4, Pringle 1-(-3); Utah: Tim Patrick 5-105, Rae Singleton 2-56, Troy McCormick 3-55, Tyrone Smith 3-31, Evan Moeai 1-18, Walla Gonzales 1-11, Demari Simpkins 1-8, Siaosi Wilkins 1-8, Terrell Burgess 1-7, Kyle Fulks 2-1, Joe Williams 3-(-2)
- Interceptions: Utah: Marcus Williams 1-0.

=== BYU ===
BYU at Utah

Team	1	2	3	4	Total
Cougars	6	7	0	6	19
• Utes	7	7	3	3	20

- Date: September 10
- Location: Rice-Eccles Stadium
  Salt Lake City, UT
- Game start: 5:36 MDT
- Elapsed time: 3:47
- Game attendance: 46,915
- Game weather: 80 °F (27 °C), Sunny, winds WSW 7 mph
- Referee: Brad Van Vark • Umpire: Michael Cooper • Linesman: George Gusman • Line judge: Frank LeBlanc • Back judge: Brian Ernest • Field judge: Jason Ledet • Side judge: Gene Semko • Center judge: Brian Alos
- TV announcers (FOX): Gus Johnson, Joel Klatt, Shannon Spake

Scoring summary

Quarter	Time	Drive			Team	Scoring information	Score	
Quarter	Time	Plays	Yards	TOP	Team	Scoring information	BYU	Utah
1	14:44				Utah	Interception returned 41 yards for touchdown by Sunia Tauteoli, Andy Phillips kick good	0	7
1	9:44	8	3	3:17	BYU	43-yard field goal by Jake Oldroyd	3	7
1	5:04	8	12	2:53	BYU	42-yard field goal by Jake Oldroyd	6	7
2	4:06	5	80	2:06	BYU	Taysom Hill 39-yard touchdown run, Jake Oldroyd kick good	13	7
2	0:17	10	72	3:41	Utah	Tim Patrick 21-yard touchdown reception from Troy Williams, Andy Phillips kick good	13	14
3	7:53	5	42	1:48	Utah	47-yard field goal by Andy Phillips	13	17
4	2:47	19	78	11:21	Utah	29-yard field goal by Andy Phillips	13	20
4	0:18	13	75	2:29	BYU	Taysom Hill 7-yard touchdown run, 2-point run failed	19	20
"TOP" = time of possession. For other American football terms, see Glossary of American football.							19	20

Game Stats:

- Passing: BYU: Taysom Hill 21-39-3--176, Mitch Juergens 1-1-0--9, Team 0-1-0--0; Utah: Troy Williams 14-23-3--194.
- Rushing: BYU: Hill 13-87, Jamaal Williams 12-58, Brayden El-Bakri 1-1, Algernon Brown 1-(-3); Utah: Troy McCormick 10-62, Zack Moss 12-58, Joe Williams 10-26, Troy Williams 7-13, Kyle Fulks 2-11, Team 1-(-1).
- Receiving: BYU: Juergens 8-52, Nick Kurtz 3-35, Moroni Laulu-Pututau 3-31, Jonah Trinnaman 2-27, Colby Pearson 2-10, Williams 1-10, Corbin Kaufusi 1-9, Aleva Hifo 1-7, Ului Lapuaho 1-4; Utah: Tyrone Smith 2-60, Tim Patrick 3-59, Rae Singleton 2-23, Evan Moeai 2-21, Harris Handley 2-21, Demari Simpkins 2-6, Joe Williams 1-4.
- Interceptions: BYU: Kai Nacua 2-0, Francis Bernard 1-0; Utah: Sunia Tauteoli 2-41, Reginald Porter 1-1.

=== At San Jose State ===
	1	2	3	4	Total
Utes	6	14	7	7	34
Spartans	3	7	0	7	17

=== USC ===
	1	2	3	4	Total
Trojans	7	10	7	3	27
#24 Utes	7	3	7	14	31

=== At California ===
	1	2	3	4	Total
#18 Utes	0	10	7	6	23
Golden Bears	14	0	7	7	28

=== Arizona ===
	1	2	3	4	Total
Wildcats	7	7	0	9	23
#24 Utes	3	9	17	7	36

=== At Oregon State ===
	1	2	3	4	Total
#21 Utes	9	3	0	7	19
Beavers	0	0	7	7	14

=== At UCLA ===
	1	2	3	4	Total
#19 Utes	14	13	18	7	52
Bruins	21	0	14	10	45

=== Washington ===
	1	2	3	4	Total
#4 Huskies	7	7	7	10	31
#17 Utes	0	10	7	7	24

=== At Arizona State ===
	1	2	3	4	Total
#13 Utes	0	21	7	21	49
Sun Devils	13	7	6	0	26

=== Oregon ===
	1	2	3	4	Total
Ducks	3	0	7	20	30
#11 Utes	7	0	7	14	28

=== At Colorado ===
	1	2	3	4	Total
#21 Utes	7	0	6	9	22
#9 Buffaloes	7	6	7	7	27

=== Vs. Indiana (Foster Farms Bowl) ===
	1	2	3	4	Total
Hoosiers	7	10	0	7	24
Utes	10	7	6	3	26
