= 2016 Stanford Cardinal football team =

American college football season

2016 Stanford Cardinal football

Sun Bowl champion

Sun Bowl, W 25–23 vs. North Carolina
- Conference: Pac-12 Conference
- North Division

Ranking
- Coaches: No. 12
- AP: No. 12
- Record: 10–3 (6–3 Pac-12)
- Head coach: David Shaw (6th season)
- Offensive coordinator: Mike Bloomgren (4th season)
- Offensive scheme: Multiple
- Defensive coordinator: Lance Anderson (3rd season)
- Base defense: 3–4
- Home stadium: Stanford Stadium

2016 Pac-12 Conference football standings
| | Conf. | | | Overall |
| Team | W | | L | W | | L |
|---|---|---|---|---|---|---|
North Division
| No. 4 Washington xy$^ | 8 | – | 1 | 12 | – | 2 |
| Washington State | 7 | – | 2 | 8 | – | 5 |
| No. 12 Stanford | 6 | – | 3 | 10 | – | 3 |
| California | 3 | – | 6 | 5 | – | 7 |
| Oregon State | 3 | – | 6 | 4 | – | 8 |
| Oregon | 2 | – | 7 | 4 | – | 8 |
South Division
| No. 17 Colorado xy | 8 | – | 1 | 10 | – | 4 |
| No. 3 USC | 7 | – | 2 | 10 | – | 3 |
| No. 23 Utah | 5 | – | 4 | 9 | – | 4 |
| Arizona State | 2 | – | 7 | 5 | – | 7 |
| UCLA | 2 | – | 7 | 4 | – | 8 |
| Arizona | 1 | – | 8 | 3 | – | 9 |
Championship: Washington 41, Colorado 10
^ – College Football Playoff participant; $ – Conference champion; x – Division champion/co-champions; y – Championship game participant; Rankings from AP Poll

The 2016 Stanford Cardinal football team represented Stanford University in the 2016 NCAA Division I FBS football season. The Cardinal were led by sixth-year head coach David Shaw. They played their home games at Stanford Stadium and were members of the North Division of the Pac-12 Conference. They finished the season 10–3, 6–3 in Pac-12 play to finish in third place in the North Division. They were invited to the Sun Bowl where they defeated North Carolina.

== Personnel ==
=== Coaching staff ===
| Name | Position | Stanford years | Alma mater |
|---|---|---|---|
| David Shaw | Head coach | 10th | Stanford (1994) |
| Lance Anderson | Defensive coordinator / outside linebackers coach | 10th | Idaho State (1996) |
| Mike Bloomgren | Associate head coach / offensive coordinator | 6th | Florida State (1999) |
| Pete Alamar | Special teams coordinator | 5th | Cal Lutheran (1983) |
| Duane Akina | Defensive backs coach | 3rd | Washington (1979) |
| Peter Hansen | Inside linebackers coach | 3rd | Arizona (2001) |
| Tavita Pritchard | Quarterbacks coach / wide receivers coach | 4th | Stanford (2009) |
| Diron Reynolds | Defensive linemen coach | 1st | Wake Forest (1994) |
| Lance Taylor | Running backs coach | 3rd | Alabama (2003) |
| Morgan Turner | Tight ends coach | 4th | Illinois (2009) |

=== Roster ===
2016 Stanford Cardinal football
| Quarterback: 10 Keller Chryst – junior (6'5, 237); 11 K. J. Costello – freshman (6'5, 220); 17 Ryan Burns – senior (6'5, 233); 18 Brent Peus – freshman (6'3, 205); 19 Jack Richardson – freshman (6'4, 205); Tailback: 5 Christian McCaffrey – junior (6'0, 202); 20 Bryce Love – sophomore (5'10, 181); 22 Cameron Scarlett – sophomore (6'1, 216); 23 Trevor Speights – freshman (5'11, 207); 28 Dorian Maddox – freshman (5'10, 205); 42 Pat McFadden – senior (5'10, 194); Fullback: 15 Reagan Williams – sophomore (6'3, 237); 35 Daniel Marx – junior (6'2, 253); 82 Chris Harrell – (redshirt) senior (6'4, 239); Wide receiver: 2 Trenton Irwin – sophomore (6'2, 202); 3 Michael Rector – (redshirt) senior (6'1, 185); 4 Jay Tyler – sophomore (5'8, 169); 6 Francis Owusu – senior (6'3, 223); 8 Donald Stewart – freshman (6'4, 200); 13 Taijuan Thomas – senior (5'10, 173); 14 Paxton Segina – freshman (6'4, 210); 19 J. J. Arcega-Whiteside – sophomore (6'3, 221); 21 Isaiah Brandt-Sims – junior (5'11, 181); 46 Sidhart Krishnamurthi – sophomore (5'11, 168); 81 Harry Schwartz – freshman (6'0, 195); 85 Treyvion Foster – senior (6'1, 209); Simi Fehoko – freshman (6'4, 190); Tight end: 9 Dalton Schultz – junior (6'6, 240); 80 Scooter Harrington – freshman (6'5, 240); 82 Kaden Smith – freshman (6'5, 250); 87 Ben Snyder – sophomore (6'4, 239); 88 Greg Taboada – senior (6'5, 250); Punter: 14 Jake Bailey – sophomore (6'2, 187) (+K); 47 Alex Robinson – senior (6'0, 216) | Offensive lineman: 54 Nick Wilson - OG – sophomore (6'3, 287); 55 Dylan Powell - OG – freshman (6'3, 270); 57 Johnny Caspers - OG-C – (redshirt) senior (6'4, 296); 58 Matthew Gutwald - OG – freshman (6'4, 295); 60 Lucas Hinds - OG-OT – senior (6'4, 284); 62 Austin Maihen - OG – sophomore (6'5, 292); 63 Nate Herbig - OG – freshman (6'4, 350); 64 David Bright - OT – senior (6'5, 301); 65 Brian Chaffin - C – sophomore (6'2, 289); 70 Clark Yarbrough - OT – freshman (6'6, 282); 71 Brandon Fanaika - OG – junior (6'3, 318); 73 Jesse Burkett - C – junior (6'4, 304); 74 Devery Hamilton - OT – freshman (6'7, 290); 75 A.T. Hall - OT – junior (6'5, 280); 76 Jack Dreyer - OT – sophomore (6'8, 306); 77 Casey Tucker - OT – junior (6'6, 296); 78 Henry Hattis - OT – freshman (6'6, 270); Defensive linemen: 51 Jovan Swann - DE-DT – freshman (6'2, 270); 56 Wesley Annan - DT – sophomore (6'4, 261); 57 Michael Williams - DE-DT – freshman (6'2, 300); 66 Harrison Phillips - DT-DE – junior (6'4, 290); 75 Jordan Watkins - DE – (redshirt) senior (6'5, 277); 80 Eric Cotton - DE – senior (6'6, 265); 90 Solomon Thomas - DE-DT – junior (6'3, 275); 91 Thomas Schaffer - DE – freshman (6'7, 270); 92 Bo Peek - DT – freshman (6'3, 296); 97 Dylan Jackson - DE – sophomore (6'6, 268); 99 Luke Kaumatule – (redshirt) senior (6'7, 294); Long snappers: 68 C.J. Keller – junior (6'3, 202); 69 Richard McNitzky – freshman (6'1, 215); Placekicker: 26 Jet Toner – freshman (6'4, 185) (+P); 27 Charlie Beall – sophomore (6'2, 205); 34 Conrad Ukropina – (redshirt) senior (6'1, 192); 37 Collin Riccitelli – freshman (6'0, 180) | Linebacker: 3 Noor Davis - ILB – (redshirt) senior (6'4, 244); 15 Jordan Perez - ILB – junior (6'2, 223); 17 Jordan Fox - OLB – freshman (6'3, 227); 20 Bobby Okereke - ILB – junior (6'3, 232); 21 Curtis Robinson - OLB – freshman (6'3, 215); 27 Sean Barton - ILB – junior (6'3, 225); 30 Craig Jones - ILB – (redshirt) senior (6'0, 223); 31 Mustafa Branch - ILB – sophomore (5'11, 218); 32 Joey Alfieri - OLB – junior (6'3, 240); 33 Mike Tyler - OLB – senior (6'5, 236); 34 Peter Kalambayi - OLB – senior (6'3, 245); 40 Anthony Trinh - OLB – freshman (6'2, 238); 43 Ryan Beecher - ILB – sophomore (6'1, 229); 44 Kevin Palma - ILB – senior (6'2, 250); 49 Lewis Burik - ILB – sophomore (5'10, 207); 52 Casey Toohill - OLB – sophomore (6'4, 245); 86 Lane Veach - OLB – junior (6'6, 239); Tangaloa Kaufusi - OLB – freshman (6'3, 220); Cornerback: 5 Frank Buncom – sophomore (6'2, 194); 4 Treyjohn Butler – freshman (5'11, 186) (+S); 11 Terrence Alexander – junior (5'10, 185); 13 Alijah Holder – junior (6'2, 185); 18 Malik Antoine – freshman (5'11, 184); 19 Ryan Gaertner – senior (5'10, 175); 22 Obi Eboh – freshman (6'2, 194); 23 Alameen Murphy – junior (5'11, 195); 24 Quenton Meeks – sophomore (6'2, 195); 26 J.J. Parson – freshman (5'10, 176); Safety: 2 Brandon Simmons – junior (6'0, 190); 8 Justin Reid - SS – sophomore (6'1, 196); 9 Ben Edwards - FS – sophomore (6'0, 195); 10 Zach Hoffpauir - FS – senior (6'0, 197); 25 Andrew Pryts – freshman (6'1, 196); 28 Denzel Franklin - SS – junior (6'0, 198); 29 Dallas Lloyd - SS – (redshirt) senior (6'3, 213); 36 Kelly Blake – freshman (6'0, 190); 45 Calvin Chandler - FS – senior (6'2, 203) |

== Schedule ==
| Date | Time | Opponent | Rank | Site | TV | Result | Attendance |
|---|---|---|---|---|---|---|---|
| September 2 | 6:00 p.m. | Kansas State* | No. 8 | Stanford Stadium; Stanford, CA | FS1 | W 26–13 | 46,147 |
| September 17 | 5:00 p.m. | USC | No. 7 | Stanford Stadium; Stanford, CA (rivalry) | ABC | W 27–10 | 48,763 |
| September 24 | 5:00 p.m. | at UCLA | No. 7 | Rose Bowl; Pasadena, CA (rivalry) | ABC | W 22–13 | 70,833 |
| September 30 | 6:00 p.m. | at No. 10 Washington | No. 7 | Husky Stadium; Seattle, WA | ESPN | L 6–44 | 72,027 |
| October 8 | 7:30 p.m. | Washington State | No. 15 | Stanford Stadium; Stanford, CA | ESPN | L 16–42 | 50,424 |
| October 15 | 4:30 p.m. | at Notre Dame* | | Notre Dame Stadium; Notre Dame, IN (Legends Trophy) | NBC | W 17–10 | 80,795 |
| October 22 | 12:00 p.m. | Colorado^{†} | | Stanford Stadium; Stanford, CA | P12N | L 5–10 | 44,535 |
| October 29 | 8:00 p.m. | at Arizona | | Arizona Stadium; Tucson, AZ | FS1 | W 34–10 | 46,740 |
| November 5 | 12:30 p.m. | Oregon State | | Stanford Stadium; Stanford, CA | FS1 | W 26–15 | 38,813 |
| November 12 | 1:00 p.m. | at Oregon | | Autzen Stadium; Eugene, OR (rivalry) | P12N | W 52–27 | 53,757 |
| November 19 | 2:30 p.m. | at California | No. 24 | California Memorial Stadium; Berkeley, CA (119th Big Game/Stanford Axe) | P12N | W 45–31 | 52,266 |
| November 26 | 5:00 p.m. | Rice* | No. 24 | Stanford Stadium; Stanford, CA | P12N | W 41–17 | 36,171 |
| December 30 | 11:00 a.m. | vs. North Carolina* | No. 18 | Sun Bowl; El Paso, TX (Sun Bowl) | CBS | W 25–23 | 42,166 |
*Non-conference game; ^{†}Homecoming; Rankings from AP Poll and CFP Rankings after November 1 released prior to game; All times are in Pacific time

== Game summaries ==
=== Kansas State ===
| | 1 | 2 | 3 | 4 | Total |
|---|---|---|---|---|---|
| Wildcats | 0 | 3 | 3 | 7 | 13 |
| #8 Cardinal | 3 | 14 | 0 | 9 | 26 |

=== USC ===
| | 1 | 2 | 3 | 4 | Total |
|---|---|---|---|---|---|
| Trojans | 3 | 0 | 7 | 0 | 10 |
| #7 Cardinal | 7 | 10 | 10 | 0 | 27 |

=== At UCLA ===
| | 1 | 2 | 3 | 4 | Total |
|---|---|---|---|---|---|
| #7 Cardinal | 3 | 0 | 3 | 16 | 22 |
| Bruins | 7 | 3 | 0 | 3 | 13 |

=== At No. 10 Washington ===
| | 1 | 2 | 3 | 4 | Total |
|---|---|---|---|---|---|
| #7 Cardinal | 0 | 0 | 6 | 0 | 6 |
| #10 Huskies | 13 | 10 | 7 | 14 | 44 |

=== Washington State ===
| | 1 | 2 | 3 | 4 | Total |
|---|---|---|---|---|---|
| Cougars | 7 | 7 | 14 | 14 | 42 |
| #15 Cardinal | 0 | 3 | 7 | 6 | 16 |

=== At Notre Dame ===
| | 1 | 2 | 3 | 4 | Total |
|---|---|---|---|---|---|
| Cardinal | 0 | 0 | 9 | 8 | 17 |
| Fighting Irish | 7 | 3 | 0 | 0 | 10 |

=== Colorado ===
| | 1 | 2 | 3 | 4 | Total |
|---|---|---|---|---|---|
| Buffaloes | 0 | 7 | 0 | 3 | 10 |
| Cardinal | 3 | 0 | 0 | 2 | 5 |

=== At Arizona ===
| | 1 | 2 | 3 | 4 | Total |
|---|---|---|---|---|---|
| Cardinal | 0 | 17 | 10 | 7 | 34 |
| Wildcats | 0 | 7 | 3 | 0 | 10 |

=== Oregon State ===
| | 1 | 2 | 3 | 4 | Total |
|---|---|---|---|---|---|
| Beavers | 0 | 7 | 0 | 8 | 15 |
| Cardinal | 10 | 3 | 10 | 3 | 26 |

=== At Oregon ===
| | 1 | 2 | 3 | 4 | Total |
|---|---|---|---|---|---|
| Cardinal | 21 | 17 | 14 | 0 | 52 |
| Ducks | 6 | 7 | 0 | 14 | 27 |

=== At California ===
| | 1 | 2 | 3 | 4 | Total |
|---|---|---|---|---|---|
| Cardinal | 7 | 10 | 14 | 14 | 45 |
| Golden Bears | 7 | 7 | 10 | 7 | 31 |

=== Rice ===
| | 1 | 2 | 3 | 4 | Total |
|---|---|---|---|---|---|
| Owls | 0 | 3 | 7 | 7 | 17 |
| #24 Cardinal | 13 | 7 | 21 | 0 | 41 |

=== Vs. North Carolina–Sun Bowl ===
| | 1 | 2 | 3 | 4 | Total |
|---|---|---|---|---|---|
| #16 Cardinal | 7 | 6 | 3 | 9 | 25 |
| Tar Heels | 7 | 0 | 10 | 6 | 23 |

== Rankings ==
Ranking movements Legend: ██ Increase in ranking ██ Decrease in ranking — = Not ranked RV = Received votes
| | Week | | | | | | | | | | | | | | | |
| Poll | Pre | 1 | 2 | 3 | 4 | 5 | 6 | 7 | 8 | 9 | 10 | 11 | 12 | 13 | 14 | Final |
|---|---|---|---|---|---|---|---|---|---|---|---|---|---|---|---|---|
| AP | 8 | 7 | 7 | 7 | 7 | 15 | RV | RV | — | — | — | RV | RV | 17 | 16 | 12 |
| Coaches | 7 | 5 | 6 | 6 | 6 | 15 | RV | RV | — | — | RV | RV | RV | 17 | 16 | 12 |
| CFP | Not released | | | | | | | | | — | — | 24 | 24 | 18 | 18 | Not released |

== Players drafted into the NFL ==
| Round | Pick | Player | Position | NFL club |
|---|---|---|---|---|
| 1 | 3 | Solomon Thomas | DE | San Francisco 49ers |
| 1 | 8 | Christian McCaffrey | RB | Carolina Panthers |
