= 2016 UCLA Bruins football team =

American college football season

2016 UCLA Bruins football
- Conference: Pac-12 Conference
- South Division
- Record: 4–8 (2–7 Pac-12)
- Head coach: Jim L. Mora (5th season)
- Offensive coordinator: Kennedy Polamalu (1st season)
- Offensive scheme: Multiple
- Defensive coordinator: Tom Bradley (2nd season)
- Base defense: 4–3
- Home stadium: Rose Bowl

Uniform
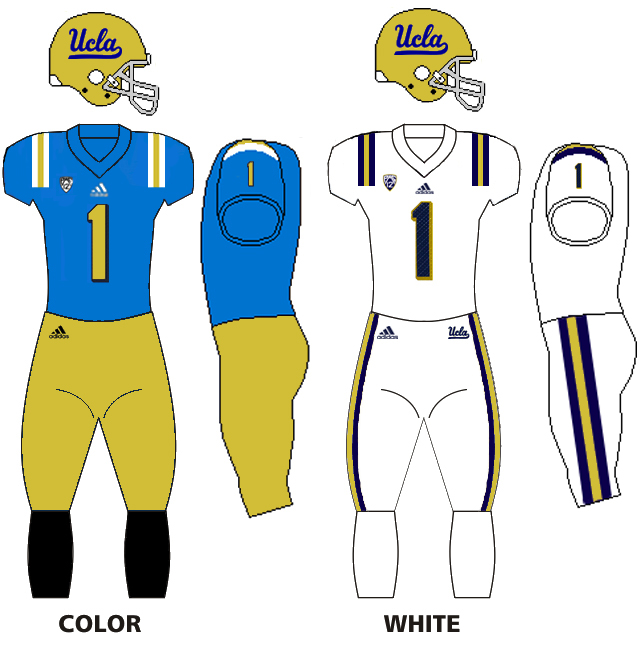

2016 Pac-12 Conference football standings
	Conf.			Overall
Team	W		L	W		L
North Division
No. 4 Washington xy$^	8	–	1	12	–	2
Washington State	7	–	2	8	–	5
No. 12 Stanford	6	–	3	10	–	3
California	3	–	6	5	–	7
Oregon State	3	–	6	4	–	8
Oregon	2	–	7	4	–	8
South Division
No. 17 Colorado xy	8	–	1	10	–	4
No. 3 USC	7	–	2	10	–	3
No. 23 Utah	5	–	4	9	–	4
Arizona State	2	–	7	5	–	7
UCLA	2	–	7	4	–	8
Arizona	1	–	8	3	–	9
Championship: Washington 41, Colorado 10
^ – College Football Playoff participant; $ – Conference champion; x – Division champion/co-champions; y – Championship game participant; Rankings from AP Poll

The 2016 UCLA Bruins football team represented the University of California, Los Angeles in the 2016 NCAA Division I FBS football season. The Bruins were coached by fifth-year head coach Jim L. Mora and played its home games at the Rose Bowl in Pasadena, California. They were members of the South Division of the Pac-12 Conference. The Bruins finished the season 4–8, 2–7 in Pac-12 play to finish in a tie for fourth in the South Division, and were outscored by their opponents by a combined total of 334 to 303.

== Preseason ==
- April 23, 2016 – Spring Showcase, Drake Stadium – 11:30 am

== Personnel ==
=== Coaching staff ===
Name	Position	Joined staff
Jim Mora	Head coach	2011
Tom Bradley	Defensive coordinator	2015
Kennedy Polamalu	Offensive coordinator	2013
Rip Scherer	Senior associate head coach / tight ends	2015
Adrian Klemm	Associate head coach / Run game coordinator / offensive line	2011
Angus McClure	Recruiting coordinator / defensive line	2007
Eric Yarber	Assistant head coach / wide receivers	2012
Marques Tuiasosopo	Pass game coordinator / quarterbacks	2016
Scott White	Special team coach / Linebackers	2015
Demetrice Martin	Assistant head coach-Defense / defensive backs	2011
Sal Alosi	Strength and conditioning coordinator	2012

=== Roster ===
2016 UCLA Bruins Roster
Quarterback: 3 Josh Rosen – sophomore; 9 Dymond Lee – freshman; 12 Mike Fafaul – (redshirt) senior; 17 Matt Lynch – freshman; 18 Devon Modster – freshman; 19 Craig Myers – (redshirt) sophomore; Running back: 1 Soso Jamabo – sophomore; 4 Bolu Olorunfunmi – sophomore; 15 Jalen Starks – freshman; 20 Brandon Stephens – freshman; 23 Nate Starks – junior; 28 Kahlil Muhammad – (redshirt) freshman; 30 Zachary Byrge – (redshirt) freshman; 32 Jalen Starks – freshman; Receiver: 1 Ishmael Adams – (redshirt) senior; 2 Jordan Lasley – (redshirt) sophomore; 6 Stephen Johnson III – sophomore; 7 Darren Andrews – (redshirt) junior; 10 Kenneth Walker III – (redshirt) senior; 14 Theo Howard – freshman; 21 Mossi Johnson – junior; 22 Demetric Felton – freshman; 24 Damian Alloway – freshman; 27 Christian Pabico – (redshirt) sophomore; 29 Brad Sochowski – (redshirt) sophomore; 82 Eldridge Massington – (redshirt) junior; 83 Alex Van Dyke – junior; 86 Audie Omotosho – freshman; Tight end: 11 Nate Iese – (redshirt) senior; 45 Giovanni Gentosi – (redshirt) sophomore; 81 Caleb Wilson – (redshirt) freshman; 85 Alex Rassool – (redshirt) sophomore; 87 Jordan Wilson – freshman; 88 Austin Roberts – (redshirt) sophomore; 99 Jake Jones – (redshirt) senior	Fullback: 35 Ainuu Taua – (redshirt) sophomore; 40 Cameron Griffin – (redshirt) sophomore; Offensive Lineman: 52 Scott Quessenberry – (redshirt) junior; 55 Michael Alves – freshman; 56 Josh Wariboko-Alali – (redshirt) freshman; 58 Gyo Shojima – (redshirt) junior; 59 Zack Bateman – (redshirt) junior; 63 Jake Tourville – (redshirt) sophomore; 65 Paco Perez – freshman; 68 Conor McDermott – (redshirt) senior; 69 Najee Toran – junior; 71 Poasi Moala – (redshirt) junior; 72 Cristian Garcia – (redshirt) senior; 73 Tevita Halalilo – (redshirt) freshman; 74 Alex Akingbulu – freshman; 75 Andre James – (redshirt) freshman; 76 Kenny Lacy – (redshirt) junior; 77 Kolton Miller – (redshirt) sophomore; Defensive Lineman: 11 Keisean Lucier-South – (redshirt) freshman; 47 Eddie Vanderdoes – (redshirt) junior; 58 Deon Hollins – senior; 69 Preston Awedesian – (redshirt) senior; 75 Boss Tagaloa – freshman; 76 Justin Rittman – (redshirt) sophomore; 89 Thomas Schwab – (redshirt) junior; 90 Rick Wade – (redshirt) freshman; 91 Jacob Tuioti-Mariner – junior; 92 Osa Odighizuwa – freshman; 93 Chigozie Nnoruka – sophomore; 94 Nick Terry – (redshirt) junior; 95 Marcus Moore – freshman; 96 Eli Ankou – (redshirt) senior; 97 Jake Burton – freshman; 98 Takkarist McKinley – senior; 99 Matt Dickerson – junior; Long snapper: 33 Johnny Den Bleyker – freshman	Linebacker: 4 Cameron Judge – senior; 12 Jayon Brown – senior; 14 Krys Barnes – freshman; 19 Josh Woods – sophomore; 32 Mique Juarez – freshman; 42 Kenny Young – junior; 43 Willie Green – (redshirt) senior; 44 Isaako Savaiinaea – senior; 52 Lokeni Toailoa – freshman; 55 Breland Brandt – freshman; Defensive back: 2 Jaleel Wadood – junior; 3 Randall Goforth – (redshirt) senior; 6 Adarius Pickett – (redshirt) sophomore; 7 John Johnson – (redshirt) junior; 9 Marcus Rios – (redshirt) senior; 10 Fabian Moreau – (redshirt) senior; 15 Brandon Burton – freshman; 17 DeChaun Holiday – (redshirt) freshman; 18 Octavius Spencer – sophomore; 20 Leni Toailoa – freshman; 21 Tahaan Goodman – senior; 22 Nate Meadors – sophomore; 23 Will Lockett – (redshirt) freshman; 24 Charles Dawson – senior; 25 Denzel Fisher – (redshirt) sophomore; 26 Jason Baker – (redshirt) freshman; 28 Keyon Riley – freshman; 31 Colin Samuel – (redshirt) freshman; 33 Dylan Luther – (redshirt) junior; Punter: 20 Stefan Flintoft – (redshirt) sophomore; 39 Adam Searl – senior; 92 Austin Kent – freshman; Kicker: 15 Andrew Strauch – (redshirt) freshman; 17 JJ Molson – freshman; 20 Stefan Flintoft – (redshirt) sophomore

== Schedule ==
Date	Time	Opponent	Rank	Site	TV	Result	Attendance
September 3	12:30 pm	at Texas A&M*	No. 16	Kyle Field; College Station, TX (SEC Nation)	CBS	L 24–31 ^{OT}	100,443
September 10	5:00 pm	UNLV*		Rose Bowl; Pasadena, CA	P12N	W 42–21	63,712
September 17	7:15 pm	at BYU*		LaVell Edwards Stadium; Provo, UT	ESPN2	W 17–14	62,904
September 24	5:00 pm	No. 7 Stanford		Rose Bowl; Pasadena, CA (rivalry)	ABC	L 13–22	70,833
October 1	7:30 pm	Arizona		Rose Bowl; Pasadena, CA	ESPN	W 45–24	68,013
October 8	7:30 pm	at Arizona State		Sun Devil Stadium; Tempe, AZ	ESPN2	L 20–23	48,509
October 15	7:30 pm	at Washington State		Martin Stadium; Pullman, WA	ESPN	L 21–27	29,310
October 22	1:00 pm	No. 19 Utah^{†}		Rose Bowl; Pasadena, CA	FOX	L 45–52	66,243
November 3	6:30 pm	at No. 21 Colorado		Folsom Field; Boulder, CO	FS1	L 10–20	43,761
November 12	6:00 pm	Oregon State		Rose Bowl; Pasadena, CA	P12N	W 38–24	64,813
November 19	7:30 pm	No. 13 USC		Rose Bowl; Pasadena, CA (rivalry/Victory Bell)	ESPN	L 14–36	71,137
November 26	4:00 pm	at California		California Memorial Stadium; Berkeley, CA (rivalry)	ESPN2	L 10–36	39,633
*Non-conference game; ^{†}Homecoming; Rankings from AP Poll released prior to the game; All times are in Pacific time

== Game summaries ==
=== At Texas A&M ===
	1	2	3	4	OT	Total
#16 Bruins	3	6	0	15	0	24
Aggies	0	10	14	0	7	31

Calling the game on CBS: Verne Lundquist, Gary Danielson and Allie LaForce.

=== UNLV ===
	1	2	3	4	Total
Rebels	7	7	7	0	21
Bruins	7	21	0	14	42

Pac-12 Networks: Ted Robinson, Yogi Roth and Cindy Brunson.

=== At BYU ===
	1	2	3	4	Total
Bruins	0	10	7	0	17
Cougars	0	0	7	7	14

=== Stanford ===
	1	2	3	4	Total
#7 Cardinal	3	0	3	16	22
Bruins	7	3	0	3	13

=== Arizona ===
	1	2	3	4	Total
Wildcats	7	0	3	14	24
Bruins	14	0	10	21	45

=== At Arizona State ===
	1	2	3	4	Total
Bruins	0	3	10	7	20
Sun Devils	3	0	17	3	23

=== At Washington State ===
	1	2	3	4	Total
Bruins	0	0	7	14	21
Cougars	3	7	14	3	27

=== Utah ===
	1	2	3	4	Total
#19 Utes	14	13	18	7	52
Bruins	21	0	14	10	45

=== At Colorado ===
	1	2	3	4	Total
Bruins	7	3	0	0	10
#21 Buffaloes	7	0	3	10	20

=== Oregon State ===
	1	2	3	4	Total
Beavers	7	7	10	0	24
Bruins	21	3	7	7	38

=== USC ===
	1	2	3	4	Total
Trojans	7	16	7	6	36
Bruins	7	7	0	0	14

=== At California ===
	1	2	3	4	Total
Bruins	0	0	10	0	10
Golden Bears	3	9	14	10	36

== Rankings ==
Ranking movements Legend: ██ Increase in ranking ██ Decrease in ranking — = Not ranked RV = Received votes
	Week															
Poll	Pre	1	2	3	4	5	6	7	8	9	10	11	12	13	14	Final
AP	16	RV	RV	RV	RV	RV	—	—	—	—	—	—	—	—		
Coaches	24	RV	RV	RV	RV	RV	—	—	—	—	—	—	—	—		
CFP	Not released									—	—	—	—	—		Not released

== Coaches ==
- Jim L. Mora, head coach
- Rip Scherer, Senior Associate head coach/tight ends
- Kennedy Polamalu, offensive coordinator/quarterbacks
- Adrian Klemm, associate head coach/running game coordinator/offensive line
- Tom Bradley, defensive coordinator
- Demetrice Martin, assistant head coach/passing game, defense/secondary
- Scott White, linebackers/special teams
- Eric Yarber, wide receivers
- Angus McClure, defensive line/recruiting coordinator
- Marques Tuiasosopo, quarterbacks coach/passing game coordinator
- Sal Alosi, coordinator of strength & conditioning

== Notes ==
- November 28 – Offensive coordinator/quarterbacks coach Kennedy Polamalu's contract was not renewed.
