= 2016 NCAA Division I FBS football rankings =

- Season: 2016
- Bowl season: 2016–17 bowl games
- Preseason No. 1: Alabama
- End of season champions: Clemson
- Conference with most teams in final AP poll: ACC, SEC, Pac-12 (5)

Two human polls and a committee's selections comprised the 2016 National Collegiate Athletic Association (NCAA) Division I Football Bowl Subdivision (FBS) football rankings, in addition to various publications' preseason polls. Unlike most sports, college football's governing body, the NCAA, does not bestow a national championship, instead that title is bestowed by one or more different polling agencies. There are two main weekly polls that began in the preseason—the AP Poll and the Coaches Poll. One additional poll was released midway through the season; the College Football Playoff (CFP) rankings are released after the eighth week.

This was the third season of the four-team College Football Playoff system which replaced the previous Bowl Championship Series system. At the conclusion of the regular season, on Sunday, December 4, 2016, the final CFP rankings determined who would play in the two bowl games designated as semifinals for the 2017 College Football Playoff National Championship on January 9, 2017, at Raymond James Stadium in Tampa, Florida.

== Legend ==
	Increase in ranking
	Decrease in ranking
	Not ranked previous week or no change
	Selected for College Football Playoff
(#–#)	Win–loss record
(Italics)	Number of first place votes
т	Tied with team above or below also with this symbol

== AP Poll ==
	Preseason Aug 21	Week 1 Sep 6	Week 2 Sep 11	Week 3 Sep 18	Week 4 Sep 25	Week 5 Oct 2	Week 6 Oct 10	Week 7 Oct 16	Week 8 Oct 23	Week 9 Oct 30	Week 10 Nov 6	Week 11 Nov 13	Week 12 Nov 20	Week 13 Nov 27	Week 14 Dec 4	Week 15 (Final) Jan 10	
1.	Alabama (33)	Alabama (1–0) (54)	Alabama (2–0) (56)	Alabama (3–0) (50)	Alabama (4–0) (50)	Alabama (5–0) (53)	Alabama (6–0) (56)	Alabama (7–0) (60)	Alabama (8–0) (60)	Alabama (8–0) (60)	Alabama (9–0) (60)	Alabama (10–0) (61)	Alabama (11–0) (61)	Alabama (12–0) (61)	Alabama (13–0)	Clemson (14–1) (60)	1.
2.	Clemson (16)	Clemson (1–0) (2)	Florida State (2–0) (4)	Ohio State (3–0) (4)	Ohio State (3–0) (4)	Ohio State (4–0) (6)	Ohio State (5–0) (2)	Ohio State (6–0)	Michigan (7–0) (1)	Michigan (8–0) (1)	Michigan (9–0) (1)	Ohio State (9–1)	Ohio State (10–1)	Ohio State (11–1)	Ohio State (11–1)	Alabama (14–1)	2.
3.	Oklahoma (4)	Florida State (1–0) (4)	Ohio State (2–0)	Louisville (3–0) (6)	Louisville (4–0) (6)	Clemson (5–0) (1)	Clemson (6–0) (2)	Michigan (6–0) (1)	Clemson (7–0)	Clemson (8–0)	Clemson (9–0)	Louisville (9–1)	Michigan (10–1)	Clemson (11–1)	Clemson (12–1)	USC (10–3)	3.
4.	Florida State (5)	Ohio State (1–0)	Michigan (2–0) (1)	Michigan (3–0) (1)	Michigan (4–0) (1)	Michigan (5–0) (1)	Michigan (6–0) (1)	Clemson (7–0)	Washington (7–0)	Washington (8–0)	Washington (9–0)	Michigan (9–1)	Clemson (10–1)	Washington (11–1)	Washington (12–1)	Washington (12–2)	4.
5.	LSU (1)	Michigan (1–0) (1)	Clemson (2–0)	Clemson (3–0)	Clemson (4–0)	Washington (5–0)	Washington (6–0)	Washington (6–0)	Louisville (6–1)	Louisville (7–1)	Louisville (8–1)	Clemson (9–1)	Wisconsin (9–2)	Michigan (10–2)	Penn State (11–2)	Oklahoma (11–2)	5.
6.	Ohio State (1)	Houston (1–0)	Houston (2–0)	Houston (3–0)	Houston (4–0)	Houston (5–0)	Texas A&M (6–0)	Texas A&M (6–0)	Ohio State (6–1)	Ohio State (7–1)	Ohio State (8–1)	Wisconsin (8–2)	Washington (10–1)	Wisconsin (10–2)	Michigan (10–2)	Ohio State (11–2)	6.
7.	Michigan (1)	Stanford (1–0)	Stanford (1–0)	Stanford (2–0)	Stanford (3–0)	Louisville (4–1)	Louisville (4–1)	Louisville (5–1)	Nebraska (7–0)	Texas A&M (7–1)	Wisconsin (7–2)	Washington (9–1)	Oklahoma (9–2)	Oklahoma (9–2)	Oklahoma (10–2)	Penn State (11–3)	7.
8.	Stanford	Washington (1–0)	Washington (2–0)	Michigan State (2–0)	Wisconsin (4–0)	Texas A&M (5–0)	Wisconsin (4–1)	Nebraska (6–0)	Baylor (6–0)	Wisconsin (6–2)	Auburn (7–2)	Oklahoma (8–2)	Penn State (9–2)	Penn State (10–2)	Wisconsin (10–3)	Florida State (10–3)	8.
9.	Tennessee	Georgia (1–0)	Wisconsin (2–0)	Washington (3–0)	Texas A&M (4–0)	Tennessee (5–0)	Tennessee (5–1)	Baylor (6–0)	Texas A&M (6–1)	Nebraska (7–1)	Oklahoma (7–2)	Penn State (8–2)	Colorado (9–2)	Colorado (10–2)	USC (9–3)	Wisconsin (11–3)	9.
10.	Notre Dame	Wisconsin (1–0)	Louisville (2–0)	Texas A&M (3–0)	Washington (4–0)	Miami (FL) (4–0)	Nebraska (5–0)	Wisconsin (4–2)	West Virginia (6–0)	Florida (6–1)	Texas A&M (7–2)	West Virginia (8–1)	Oklahoma State (9–2)	USC (9–3)	Florida State (9–3)	Michigan (10–3)	10.
11.	Ole Miss	Texas (1–0)	Texas (2–0)	Wisconsin (3–0)	Tennessee (4–0)	Wisconsin (4–1)	Baylor (5–0)	Houston (6–1)	Wisconsin (5–2)	Auburn (6–2)	West Virginia (7–1)	Utah (8–2)	Louisville (9–2)	Oklahoma State (9–2)	Colorado (10–3)	Oklahoma State (10–3)	11.
12.	Michigan State	Michigan State (1–0)	Michigan State (1–0)	Georgia (3–0)	Florida State (3–1)	Nebraska (5–0)	Ole Miss (3–2)	West Virginia (5–0)	Florida State (5–2)	Oklahoma (6–2)	Penn State (7–2)	Colorado (8–2)	USC (8–3)	Florida State (9–3)	Western Michigan (13–0)	Stanford (10–3)	12.
13.	TCU	Louisville (1–0)	Iowa (2–0)	Florida State (2–1)	Baylor (4–0)	Baylor (5–0)	Houston (5–1)	Florida State (5–2)	Boise State (7–0)	Baylor (6–1)	Utah (7–2)	Oklahoma State (8–2)	Florida (8–2)	Western Michigan (12–0)	Oklahoma State (9–3)	LSU (8–4)	13.
14.	Washington	Oklahoma (0–1)	Oklahoma (1–1)	Tennessee (3–0)	Miami (FL) (3–0)	Ole Miss (3–2)	Florida State (4–2)	Boise State (6–0)	Florida (5–1)	West Virginia (6–1)	Western Michigan (9–0)	Western Michigan (10–0)	Western Michigan (11–0)	West Virginia (9–2)	West Virginia (10–2)	Florida (9–4)	14.
15.	Houston	TCU (1–0)	Tennessee (2–0)	Miami (FL) (3–0)	Nebraska (4–0)	Stanford (3–1)	Boise State (5–0)	Florida (5–1)	Auburn (5–2)	LSU (5–2)	North Carolina (7–2)	USC (7–3)	Florida State (8–3)	Florida (8–3)	Louisville (9–3)	Western Michigan (13–1)	15.
16.	UCLA	Iowa (1–0)	Georgia (2–0)	Baylor (3–0)	Ole Miss (2–2)	Arkansas (4–1)	Miami (FL) (4–1)	Oklahoma (4–2)	Oklahoma (5–2)	Utah (7–2)	Colorado (7–2)	LSU (6–3)	Auburn (8–3)	Louisville (9–3)	Stanford (9–3)	Virginia Tech (10–4)	16.
17.	Iowa	Tennessee (1–0)	Texas A&M (2–0)	Arkansas (3–0)	Michigan State (2–1)	North Carolina (4–1)	Virginia Tech (4–1)	Arkansas (5–2)	Utah (7–1)	Western Michigan (8–0)	Oklahoma State (7–2)	Florida State (7–3)	Nebraska (9–2)	Stanford (9–3)	Auburn (8–4)	Colorado (10–4)	17.
18.	Georgia	Notre Dame (0–1)	Notre Dame (1–1)	LSU (2–1)	Utah (4–0)	Florida (4–1)	Florida (4–1)	Tennessee (5–2)	Tennessee (5–2)	North Carolina (6–2)	Virginia Tech (7–2)	Auburn (7–3)	Houston (9–2)	Auburn (8–4)	Virginia Tech (9–4)	West Virginia (10–3)	18.
19.	Louisville	Ole Miss (0–1)	Ole Miss (1–1)	Florida (3–0)	San Diego State (3–0)	Boise State (4–0)	Oklahoma (3–2)	Utah (6–1)	LSU (5–2)	Florida State (5–3)	LSU (5–3)	Nebraska (8–2)	West Virginia (8–2)	Virginia Tech (9–3)	LSU (7–4)	South Florida (11–2)	19.
20.	USC	Texas A&M (1–0)	LSU (1–1)	Nebraska (3–0)	Arkansas (3–1)	Oklahoma (2–2)	West Virginia (4–0)	Western Michigan (7–0)	Western Michigan (8–0)	Penn State (6–2)	Florida State (6–3)	Washington State (8–2)	Boise State (10–1)	Navy (9–2)	Florida (8–4)	Miami (FL) (9–4)	20.
21.	Oklahoma State	LSU (0–1)	Baylor (2–0)	Texas (2–1)	TCU (3–1)	Colorado (4–1)	Utah (5–1)	Auburn (4–2)	North Carolina (6–2)	Colorado (6–2)	Nebraska (7–2)	Florida (7–2)	Utah (8–3)	LSU (7–4)	Iowa (8–4)	Louisville (9–4)	21.
22.	North Carolina	Oklahoma State (1–0)	Oregon (2–0)	San Diego State (3–0)	Texas (2–1)	West Virginia (4–0)	Arkansas (4–2)	North Carolina (5–2)	Navy (5–1)	Oklahoma State (6–2)	Florida (6–2)	Boise State (9–1)	Texas A&M (8–3)	Iowa (8–4)	Pittsburgh (8–4)	Tennessee (9–4)	22.
23.	Baylor	Baylor (1–0)	Florida (2–0)	Ole Miss (1–2)	Florida (3–1)	Florida State (3–2)	Auburn (4–2)	Ole Miss (3–3)	Colorado (6–2)	Virginia Tech (6–2)	Washington State (7–2)	Texas A&M (7–3)	Washington State (8–3)	Nebraska (9–3)	Temple (10–3)	Utah (9–4)	23.
24.	Oregon	Oregon (1–0)	Arkansas (2–0)	Utah (3–0)	Boise State (3–0)	Utah (4–1)	Western Michigan (6–0)	Navy (4–1)	Penn State (5–2)	Boise State (7–1)	Boise State (8–1)	San Diego State (9–1)	Tennessee (8–3)	Pittsburgh (8–4) т	Nebraska (9–3)	Auburn (8–5)	24.
25.	Florida	Miami (FL) (1–0)	Miami (FL) (2–0)	Oklahoma (1–2)	Georgia (3–1)	Virginia Tech (3–1)	Navy (4–1)	LSU (4–2)	Virginia Tech (5–2)	Washington State (6–2)	Baylor (6–2)	Troy (8–1)	LSU (6–4)	South Florida (10–2) т	South Florida (10–2)	San Diego State (11–3)	25.
	Preseason Aug 21	Week 1 Sep 6	Week 2 Sep 11	Week 3 Sep 18	Week 4 Sep 25	Week 5 Oct 2	Week 6 Oct 10	Week 7 Oct 16	Week 8 Oct 23	Week 9 Oct 30	Week 10 Nov 6	Week 11 Nov 13	Week 12 Nov 20	Week 13 Nov 27	Week 14 Dec 4	Week 15 (Final) Jan 10	
		Dropped: UCLA; USC; North Carolina; Florida	Dropped: TCU; Oklahoma State	Dropped: Iowa; Notre Dame; Oregon	Dropped: LSU; Oklahoma	Dropped: Michigan State; San Diego State; TCU; Texas; Georgia	Dropped: Stanford; North Carolina; Colorado	Dropped: Miami (FL); Virginia Tech	Dropped: Houston; Arkansas; Ole Miss	Dropped: Tennessee; Navy	None	Dropped: North Carolina; Virginia Tech; Baylor	Dropped: San Diego State; Troy	Dropped: Houston; Boise State; Utah; Texas A&M; Washington State; Tennessee	Dropped: Navy	Dropped: Iowa; Pittsburgh; Temple; Nebraska	

== Coaches Poll ==
	Preseason Aug 4	Week 1 Sep 6	Week 2 Sep 11	Week 3 Sep 18	Week 4 Sep 25	Week 5 Oct 2	Week 6 Oct 10	Week 7 Oct 16	Week 8 Oct 23	Week 9 Oct 30	Week 10 Nov 6	Week 11 Nov 13	Week 12 Nov 20	Week 13 Nov 27	Week 14 Dec 4	Week 15 (Final) Jan 10	
1.	Alabama (55)	Alabama (1–0) (62)	Alabama (2–0) (62)	Alabama (3–0) (60)	Alabama (4–0) (61)	Alabama (5–0) (57)	Alabama (6–0) (58)	Alabama (7–0) (61)	Alabama (8–0) (63)	Alabama (8–0) (63)	Alabama (9–0) (62)	Alabama (10–0) (63)	Alabama (11–0) (63)	Alabama (12–0) (64)	Alabama (13–0)	Clemson (14–1)	1.
2.	Clemson (7)	Clemson (1–0) (2)	Florida State (2–0) (1)	Ohio State (3–0) (3)	Ohio State (3–0) (2)	Ohio State (4–0) (3)	Ohio State (5–0) (4)	Ohio State (6–0) (2)	Michigan (7–0) (1)	Michigan (8–0)	Clemson (9–0) (2)	Ohio State (9–1)	Ohio State (10–1)	Ohio State (11–1)	Ohio State (11–1)	Alabama (14–1)	2.
3.	Oklahoma	Florida State (1–0)	Clemson (2–0) (1)	Clemson (3–0) (1)	Clemson (4–0) (1)	Clemson (5–0) (2)	Clemson (6–0) (1)	Clemson (7–0) (1)	Clemson (7–0)	Clemson (8–0) (1)	Michigan (9–0)	Louisville (9–1)	Clemson (10–1)	Clemson (11–1)	Clemson (12–1)	Oklahoma (11–2)	3.
4.	Florida State (1)	Ohio State (1–0)	Ohio State (2–0)	Louisville (3–0)	Louisville (4–0)	Michigan (5–0) (1)	Michigan (6–0)	Michigan (6–0)	Washington (7–0)	Washington (8–0)	Washington (9–0)	Michigan (9–1)	Michigan (10–1)	Washington (11–1)	Washington (12–1)	Washington (12–2)	4.
5.	Ohio State	Stanford (1–0)	Michigan (2–0)	Michigan (3–0)	Michigan (4–0)	Houston (5–0)	Washington (6–0)	Washington (6–0)	Louisville (6–1)	Louisville (7–1)	Ohio State (8–1)	Clemson (9–1)	Washington (10–1)	Wisconsin (10–2)	Penn State (11–2)	USC (10–3)	5.
6.	LSU	Michigan (1–0)	Stanford (1–0)	Stanford (2–0)	Stanford (3–0)	Washington (5–0)	Texas A&M (6–0)	Texas A&M (6–0)	Nebraska (7–0)	Ohio State (7–1)	Louisville (8–1)	Wisconsin (8–2)	Wisconsin (9–2)	Michigan (10–2)	Michigan (10–2)	Ohio State (11–2)	6.
7.	Stanford	Houston (1–0)	Houston (2–0)	Houston (3–0)	Houston (4–0)	Texas A&M (5–0)	Louisville (4–1)	Louisville (5–1)	Baylor (6–0)	Texas A&M (7–1)	Wisconsin (7–2)	Washington (9–1)	Oklahoma (9–2)	Oklahoma (9–2)	Oklahoma (10–2)	Penn State (11–3)	7.
8.	Michigan	Michigan State (1–0)	Michigan State (1–0)	Michigan State (2–0)	Wisconsin (4–0)	Louisville (4–1)	Baylor (5–0)	Baylor (6–0)	Ohio State (6–1)	Wisconsin (6–2)	Auburn (7–2)	Oklahoma (8–2)	Penn State (9–2)	Penn State (10–2)	Wisconsin (10–3)	Florida State (10–3)	8.
9.	Notre Dame	Georgia (1–0)	Washington (2–0)	Washington (3–0)	Washington (4–0)	Tennessee (5–0)	Nebraska (5–0)	Nebraska (6–0)	West Virginia (6–0)	Florida (6–1)	Oklahoma (7–2)	West Virginia (8–1)	Colorado (9–2)	Colorado (10–2)	USC (9–3)	Wisconsin (11–3)	9.
10.	Tennessee (1)	Iowa (1–0)	Louisville (2–0)	Wisconsin (3–0)	Texas A&M (4–0)	Miami (FL) (4–0)	Wisconsin (4–1)	Wisconsin (4–2)	Texas A&M (6–1)	Nebraska (7–1)	West Virginia (7–1)	Penn State (8–2)	Oklahoma State (9–2)	Oklahoma State (9–2)	Florida State (9–3)	Michigan (10–3)	10.
11.	Michigan State	Washington (1–0)	Iowa (2–0)	Georgia (3–0)	Tennessee (4–0)	Baylor (5–0)	Tennessee (5–1)	Houston (6–1)	Wisconsin (5–2)	Oklahoma (6–2)	Texas A&M (7–2)	Utah (8–2)	Louisville (9–2)	USC (9–3)	Colorado (10–3)	Oklahoma State (10–3)	11.
12.	Ole Miss	TCU (1–0)	Wisconsin (2–0)	Tennessee (3–0)	Florida State (3–1)	Nebraska (5–0)	Houston (5–1)	Florida (5–1)	Florida (5–1)	Auburn (6–2)	Utah (7–2)	Colorado (8–2)	USC (8–3)	Florida State (9–3)	West Virginia (10–2)	Stanford (10–3)	12.
13.	Houston	Oklahoma (0–1)	Georgia (2–0)	Texas A&M (3–0)	Baylor (4–0)	Wisconsin (4–1)	Ole Miss (3–2)	West Virginia (5–0)	Boise State (7–0)	Baylor (6–1)	North Carolina (7–2)	Oklahoma State (8–2)	Florida (8–2)	West Virginia (9–2)	Oklahoma State (9–3)	Florida (9–4)	13.
14.	TCU	Tennessee (1–0)	Oklahoma (1–1)	Florida State (2–1)	Miami (FL) (3–0)	Ole Miss (3–2)	Florida (4–1)	Boise State (6–0)	Florida State (5–2)	LSU (5–2)	Penn State (7–2)	LSU (6–3)	Florida State (8–3)	Western Michigan (12–0)	Louisville (9–3)	LSU (8–4)	14.
15.	Iowa	Louisville (1–0)	Tennessee (2–0)	Baylor (3–0)	Nebraska (4–0)	Stanford (3–1)	Boise State (5–0)	Florida State (5–2)	Oklahoma (5–2)	West Virginia (6–1)	Colorado (7–2)	Florida State (7–3)	Nebraska (9–2)	Louisville (9–3)	Western Michigan (13–0)	Colorado (10–4)	15.
16.	Georgia	Wisconsin (1–0)	Texas (2–0)	Florida (3–0)	Michigan State (2–1)	North Carolina (4–1)	Florida State (4–2)	Oklahoma (4–2)	Utah (7–1)	Utah (7–2)	Florida (6–2)	Auburn (7–3)	Auburn (8–3)	Florida (8–3)	Stanford (9–3)	Virginia Tech (10–4)	16.
17.	USC	Oklahoma State (1–0)	Ole Miss (1–1)	LSU (2–1)	Ole Miss (2–2)	Arkansas (4–1)	Miami (FL) (4–1)	Arkansas (5–2)	Auburn (5–2)	North Carolina (6–2)	Oklahoma State (7–2)	Nebraska (8–2)	West Virginia (8–2)	Stanford (9–3)	Auburn (8–4)	West Virginia (10–3)	17.
18.	Washington	Ole Miss (0–1)	Notre Dame (1–1)	Arkansas (3–0)	Utah (4–0)	Florida (4–1)	West Virginia (4–0)	Utah (6–1)	Tennessee (5–2)	Western Michigan (8–0)	Florida State (6–3)	Florida (7–2)	Western Michigan (11–0)	Virginia Tech (9–3)	Florida (8–4)	Western Michigan (13–1)	18.
19.	Oklahoma State	Baylor (1–0)	Baylor (2–0)	Miami (FL) (3–0)	TCU (3–1)	Boise State (4–0)	Virginia Tech (4–1)	Tennessee (5–2)	LSU (5–2)	Florida State (5–3)	LSU (5–3)	USC (7–3)	Boise State (10–1)	Auburn (8–4)	Virginia Tech (9–4)	South Florida (11–2)	19.
20.	North Carolina	Texas (1–0)	Texas A&M (2–0)	Nebraska (3–0)	Georgia (3–1)	West Virginia (4–0)	Oklahoma (3–2)	Western Michigan (7–0)	North Carolina (6–2)	Colorado (6–2)	Nebraska (7–2)	Washington State (8–2)	Utah (8–3)	Navy (9–2)	LSU (7–4)	Louisville (9–4)	20.
21.	Baylor	Notre Dame (0–1)	Oregon (2–0)	Ole Miss (1–2)	Florida (3–1)	Florida State (3–2)	Utah (5–1)	North Carolina (5–2)	Western Michigan (8–0)	Virginia Tech (6–2)	Western Michigan (9–0)	Western Michigan (10–0)	Houston (9–2)	LSU (7–4)	Nebraska (9–3)	Utah (9–4)	21.
22.	Oregon	LSU (0–1)	LSU (1–1)	TCU (2–1)	Arkansas (3–1)	Oklahoma (2–2)	Arkansas (4–2)	Ole Miss (3–3)	Navy (5–1)	Oklahoma State (6–2)	Virginia Tech (7–2)	Texas A&M (7–3)	Texas A&M (8–3)	Nebraska (9–3)	South Florida (10–2)	Auburn (8–5)	22.
23.	Louisville	Oregon (1–0)	Florida (2–0)	Utah (3–0)	North Carolina (3–1)	Colorado (4–1)	Western Michigan (6–0)	LSU (4–2)	Colorado (6–2)	Penn State (6–2)	Washington State (7–2)	Boise State (9–1)	Washington State (8–3)	South Florida (10–2)	Utah (8–4)	Miami (FL) (9–4)	23.
24.	UCLA	Texas A&M (1–0)	Arkansas (2–0)	Texas (2–1)	San Diego State (3–0)	Utah (4–1)	Arizona State (5–1)	Auburn (4–2)	Houston (6–2)	Boise State (7–1)	Boise State (8–1)	North Carolina (7–3)	Tennessee (8–3)	Utah (8–4)	Temple (10–3)	Tennessee (9–4)	24.
25.	Florida	Florida (1–0)	Miami (FL) (2–0)	Iowa (2–1)	Texas (2–1)	Western Michigan (5–0)	LSU (3–2)	Navy (4–1)	Virginia Tech (5–2)	Washington State (6–2)	Baylor (7–2)	San Diego State (9–1)	North Carolina (8–3)	Iowa (8–4)	Iowa (8–4)	San Diego State (11–3)	25.
	Preseason Aug 4	Week 1 Sep 6	Week 2 Sep 11	Week 3 Sep 18	Week 4 Sep 25	Week 5 Oct 2	Week 6 Oct 10	Week 7 Oct 16	Week 8 Oct 23	Week 9 Oct 30	Week 10 Nov 6	Week 11 Nov 13	Week 12 Nov 20	Week 13 Nov 27	Week 14 Dec 4	Week 15 (Final) Jan 10	
		Dropped: USC; North Carolina; UCLA	Dropped: TCU; Oklahoma State	Dropped: Oklahoma; Notre Dame; Oregon	Dropped: LSU; Iowa	Dropped: Michigan State; TCU; Georgia; San Diego State; Texas	Dropped: Stanford; North Carolina; Colorado	Dropped: Miami (FL); Virginia Tech; Arizona State	Dropped: Arkansas; Ole Miss	Dropped: Tennessee; Navy; Houston	None	Dropped: Virginia Tech; Baylor	Dropped: LSU; San Diego State	Dropped: Boise State; Houston; Texas A&M; Washington State; Tennessee; North Carolina	Dropped: Navy	Dropped: Nebraska; Temple; Iowa	

== CFP rankings ==
	Week 9 Nov 1	Week 10 Nov 8	Week 11 Nov 15	Week 12 Nov 22	Week 13 Nov 29	Week 14 (Final) Dec 4	
1.	Alabama (8–0)	Alabama (9–0)	Alabama (10–0)	Alabama (11–0)	Alabama (12–0)	Alabama (13–0)	1.
2.	Clemson (8–0)	Clemson (9–0)	Ohio State (9–1)	Ohio State (10–1)	Ohio State (11–1)	Clemson (12–1)	2.
3.	Michigan (8–0)	Michigan (9–0)	Michigan (9–1)	Michigan (10–1)	Clemson (11–1)	Ohio State (11–1)	3.
4.	Texas A&M (7–1)	Washington (9–0)	Clemson (9–1)	Clemson (10–1)	Washington (11–1)	Washington (12–1)	4.
5.	Washington (8–0)	Ohio State (8–1)	Louisville (9–1)	Washington (10–1)	Michigan (10–2)	Penn State (11–2)	5.
6.	Ohio State (7–1)	Louisville (8–1)	Washington (9–1)	Wisconsin (9–2)	Wisconsin (10–2)	Michigan (10–2)	6.
7.	Louisville (7–1)	Wisconsin (7–2)	Wisconsin (8–2)	Penn State (9–2)	Penn State (10–2)	Oklahoma (10–2)	7.
8.	Wisconsin (6–2)	Texas A&M (7–2)	Penn State (8–2)	Oklahoma (9–2)	Colorado (10–2)	Wisconsin (10–3)	8.
9.	Auburn (6–2)	Auburn (7–2)	Oklahoma (8–2)	Colorado (9–2)	Oklahoma (9–2)	USC (9–3)	9.
10.	Nebraska (7–1)	Penn State (7–2)	Colorado (8–2)	Oklahoma State (9–2)	Oklahoma State (9–2)	Colorado (10–3)	10.
11.	Florida (6–1)	Oklahoma (7–2)	Oklahoma State (8–2)	Louisville (9–2)	USC (9–3)	Florida State (9–3)	11.
12.	Penn State (6–2)	Colorado (7–2)	Utah (8–2)	USC (8–3)	Florida State (9–3)	Oklahoma State (9–3)	12.
13.	LSU (5–2)	Oklahoma State (7–2)	USC (7–3)	Auburn (8–3)	Louisville (9–3)	Louisville (9–3)	13.
14.	Oklahoma (6–2)	Virginia Tech (7–2)	West Virginia (8–1)	Florida State (8–3)	Auburn (8–4)	Auburn (8–4)	14.
15.	Colorado (6–2)	Utah (7–2)	Auburn (7–3)	Florida (8–2)	Florida (8–3)	Western Michigan (13–0)	15.
16.	Utah (7–2)	West Virginia (7–1)	LSU (6–3)	Nebraska (9–2)	West Virginia (9–2)	West Virginia (10–2)	16.
17.	Baylor (6–1)	North Carolina (7–2)	Florida State (7–3)	Tennessee (8–3)	Western Michigan (12–0)	Florida (8–4)	17.
18.	Oklahoma State (6–2)	Florida State (6–3)	Nebraska (8–2)	West Virginia (8–2)	Stanford (9–3)	Stanford (9–3)	18.
19.	Virginia Tech (6–2)	Nebraska (7–2)	Tennessee (7–3)	Boise State (10–1)	Navy (9–2)	Utah (8–4)	19.
20.	West Virginia (6–1)	USC (6–3)	Boise State (9–1)	Houston (9–2)	Utah (8–4)	LSU (7–4)	20.
21.	North Carolina (6–2)	Western Michigan (9–0)	Western Michigan (10–0)	Western Michigan (11–0)	LSU (7–4)	Tennessee (8–4)	21.
22.	Florida State (5–3)	Boise State (8–1)	Washington State (8–2)	Utah (8–3)	Tennessee (8–4)	Virginia Tech (9–4)	22.
23.	Western Michigan (8–0)	Washington State (7–2)	Florida (7–2)	Washington State (8–3)	Virginia Tech (9–3)	Pittsburgh (8–4)	23.
24.	Boise State (7–1)	LSU (5–3)	Stanford (7–3)	Stanford (8–3)	Houston (9–3)	Temple (10–3)	24.
25.	Washington State (6–2)	Arkansas (6–3)	Texas A&M (7–3)	Navy (8–2)	Pittsburgh (8–4)	Navy (9–3)	25.
	Week 9 Nov 1	Week 10 Nov 8	Week 11 Nov 15	Week 12 Nov 22	Week 13 Nov 29	Week 14 (Final) Dec 4	
		Dropped: Florida; Baylor	Dropped: Virginia Tech; North Carolina; Arkansas	Dropped: LSU; Texas A&M	Dropped: Nebraska; Boise State; Washington State	Dropped: Houston	
