= Gunter Brewer =

American football player and coach (born 1964)

Current position
- Title: Tight ends coach/interim offensive coordinator
- Team: Marshall
- Conference: Sun Belt

Biographical details
- Born: August 9, 1964 (age 62); Columbus, Mississippi, U.S.

Playing career
- 1983–1986: Wake Forest
- Position: Wide receiver

Coaching career (HC unless noted)
- 1986–1987: Wake Forest (S&C)
- 1988–1989: Ole Miss (GA)
- 1989: Anges Bleus (OC)
- 1990: Ole Miss (GA)
- 1990–1995: East Tennessee State (WR/RC)
- 1995: Northeast Mississippi
- 1996–1999: Marshall (WR/co-OC)
- 2000–2004: North Carolina (WR)
- 2005–2007: Oklahoma State (WR)
- 2008: Oklahoma State (co-OC/QB)
- 2009–2010: Oklahoma State (co-OC/WR)
- 2011: Ole Miss (AHC/PGC/WR)
- 2012–2017: North Carolina (co-OC/WR)
- 2018: Philadelphia Eagles (WR)
- 2019–2021: Louisville (WR)
- 2022–2023: Maryland (WR/PGC)
- 2024: Virginia Tech (Director of High School Relations)
- 2025–2026: Marshall (AHC/TE/IWR)
- 2026–present: Marshall (AHC/TE/IWR/interim OC)

Head coaching record
- Overall: 0–10

Gunter Brewer (born August 9, 1964) is an American football coach who is currently the tight ends coach for Marshall. A longtime wide receivers coach, Brewer gained the reputation of an elite receivers coach, coaching the likes of Dez Bryant, and Biletnikoff Award winners Randy Moss and Justin Blackmon.

== Coaching career ==
After his playing career at Wake Forest ended, Brewer spent time with the Demon Deacons as a strength & conditioning assistant, before going on to assistant coach posts at Ole Miss, East Tennessee State, Marshall, North Carolina, and Oklahoma State.

Brewer left Oklahoma State in 2011 to join the coaching staff at Ole Miss as their associate head coach, passing game coordinator, and wide receivers coach. He only spent one season with the Rebels before leaving to join the coaching staff at North Carolina as their co-offensive coordinator and wide receivers coach.

Brewer was named the wide receivers coach for the Philadelphia Eagles before the 2018 season. After a season where they played as the defending Super Bowl champions and finished 9–7, Brewer had his contract terminated by the Eagles as the receiving corps had issues with substitutions among other things.

Brewer was hired to be the wide receivers coach at Louisville in 2019.

On November 15, 2026, Brewer was named interim offensive coordinator for Marshall after the firing of Rod Smith.

== Head coaching record ==
Year	Team	Overall	Conference	Standing	Bowl/playoffs
Northeast Mississippi Tigers (Mississippi Association of Community Colleges Conference) (1995)
1995	Northeast Mississippi	0–10	0–6	7th (North)	
Northeast Mississippi:		0–10	0–6		
Total:		0–10			
