= 2016 Texas Longhorns football team =

American college football season

2016 Texas Longhorns football
- Conference: Big 12 Conference
- Record: 5–7 (3–6 Big 12)
- Head coach: Charlie Strong (3rd season)
- Offensive coordinator: Sterlin Gilbert (1st season)
- Offensive scheme: Veer and Shoot
- Defensive coordinator: Vance Bedford (3rd season)
- Base defense: 3–3–5
- Home stadium: Darrell K Royal–Texas Memorial Stadium

2016 Big 12 Conference football standings
	Conf.			Overall
Team	W		L	W		L
No. 5 Oklahoma $	9	–	0	11	–	2
No. 11 Oklahoma State	7	–	2	10	–	3
No. 18 West Virginia	7	–	2	10	–	3
Kansas State	6	–	3	9	–	4
TCU	4	–	5	6	–	7
Baylor	3	–	6	7	–	6
Texas	3	–	6	5	–	7
Texas Tech	3	–	6	5	–	7
Iowa State	2	–	7	3	–	9
Kansas	1	–	8	2	–	10
$ – Conference champion; Rankings from AP Poll

The 2016 Texas Longhorns football team, known variously as "Texas", "UT", the "Longhorns", or the "Horns", was a collegiate American football team representing the University of Texas at Austin as a member of the Big 12 Conference in the 2016 NCAA Division I FBS football season; the 2016 team was the 124th to represent the university in college football. The Longhorns were led by third-year head coach Charlie Strong with Sterlin Gilbert as the team's offensive coordinator and Vance Bedford as the team's defensive coordinator. The team played its home games at Darrell K Royal–Texas Memorial Stadium in Austin, Texas, where the team is based.

Following a 5–7 season the previous year, the 2016 preseason involved several coaching changes for the Texas Longhorns football team. A search for a new offensive coordinator carried over from the end of the 2015 season, and culminated with the hires of offensive coordinator Sterlin Gilbert alongside offensive line coach Matt Mattox in December 2015. Departures and dismissals of specialists at the running back, defensive back, and wide receiver coaching positions led to hires at those vacancies in February 2016. Despite the shakeup, the Longhorns signed a consensus top-15 ranked recruiting class on National Signing Day, with additional transfers in the successive months improving the recruiting class to a consensus top-10 nationally.

After a second-straight 5–7 season that included the Longhorns' first loss to Kansas since 1938, the University of Texas fired Charlie Strong at a morning meeting on November 26, 2016.

== Preseason ==
The Texas Longhorns finished the previous season with an overall record of 5–7, with a 3–5 record in Big 12 play; this placed Texas at seventh in the conference. Although select 5–7 football teams, namely those with the highest Academic Progress Rates (APR), filled several bowl games as an inadequate number of teams finished with the six wins traditionally required for bowl eligibility, Texas did not have a high enough APR; thus, the season ended with a regular season upset win over the Baylor Bears.

Towards the end of the 2015 season, Texas' administration reportedly began showing interest in hiring then TCU co-offensive coordinator Sonny Cumbie to serve as an offensive coordinator for the Longhorns in 2016. This interest culminated in several meetings and an eventual offer by Charlie Strong in early December 2015; Cumbie eventually turned down the offer. Concurrently, the Longhorns administration expressed interest in Tulsa co-offensive coordinator Sterlin Gilbert for the same job at Texas, among other candidates. Despite media reports suggesting that Gilbert took the Texas job on December 11, later reports from the same day indicated that Gilbert had also turned down the coaching offer. Allegedly, inconsistencies with the exact terms of the offer led to Gilbert's initial refusal. However, further negotiations between Texas and Gilbert resulted in the official announcement of Texas' hiring of the former Tulsa offensive coordinator, along with Gilbert's offensive line coach, Matt Mattox, on December 12, 2015. Consequently, offensive coordinator Shawn Watson and offensive line coach Joe Wickline, who had remained a part of the Texas coaching staff since 2014, were released.

Concurrent with Texas' search for a new offensive coordinator, Missouri reportedly showed interest in Texas special teams and tight end coach Jeff Traylor. On December 16, Traylor was offered and accepted a pay raise from the Longhorns, suggesting that Traylor's scheduled interview with the Missouri Tigers was eventually canceled. Traylor later interviewed for the vacant head coach position at Texas State in January 2016, though Texas State would eventually hire Everett Withers as head coach. Traylor's son, Jordan Traylor, became a graduate assistant for the Longhorns on January 8 after finishing his collegiate football career at Texas A&M. On January 18, Texas running backs coach Tommie Robinson announced his departure from Austin to join the University of Southern California (USC) coaching staff for the same position, meaning that none of initial offensive staff hires made by Charlie Strong at the beginning of his first year at Texas will be set to coach the Longhorns in 2016. On February 11, Texas defensive backs coach Chris Vaughn was dismissed from the team after he was implicated in an ongoing NCAA investigation of the Ole Miss Rebels football team. The same day, wide receivers coach Jay Norvell left the University of Texas to coach at the same position at Arizona State, resulting in a total of three significant coaching vacancies at Texas by mid-February.

On February 12, Texas was set to reportedly hire Purdue defensive backs coach Taver Johnson; however, Texas would eventually hire Arkansas defensive backs coach Clay Jennings on February 17 to fill the same vacant position at Texas. Concurrently, the Longhorns hired two other coaches to fill Texas coaching vacancies, including former Toledo Rockets co-offensive coordinator Anthony Johnson as a running backs coach on February 13 and former Indianapolis Colts running backs coach Charlie Williams as a wide receivers coach on February 15. Around the same time, Texas A&M pitched an offer to Longhorns defensive line coach Brick Haley, though Haley decided to stay with the Longhorns.

=== Spring practice ===
The Longhorns began spring practice on March 7, which subsequent practices interspersed over the following weeks. Charlie Strong noted that the top three priorities for spring practice were to develop Texas' defensive linemen, wide receivers, and quarterbacks. Spring practices began utilizing shoulder pads on March 11. On March 29, Jerrod Heard, who had served as the starting quarterback for Texas during several games in 2015, suffered a shoulder injury during practice. Although no timetable for his return to practice was set, the university indicated the injury was a minor sprain of his throwing shoulder. By April 5, the Longhorns had completed ten spring practice sessions.

==== Spring game ====
2016 Orange and White Spring Game

Team	1	2	Total
Horns	7	0	7
• Texas	7	14	21

- Date: April 16, 2016
- Location: Austin, Texas
- Game start: 1:04 p.m. CST
- Elapsed time: 1:44
- Game weather: Overcast with light rain, 71 °F (22 °C), winds from the south at 5–10 mph (8.0–16.1 km/h)
- Television network: LHN

Scoring summary
1	2:34	Horns	Armanti Foreman 27-yard pass from Shane Buechele (Mitchel Becker kick)	Horns 7–0
1	1:32	Texas	Chris Warren III 51-yard run (Mitchel Becker kick)	7–7
2	9:16	Texas	D'Onta Foreman 4-yard run (Mitchel Becker kick)	Texas 7–14
2	4:25	Texas	John Burt 65-yard pass from Shane Buechele (Mitchel Becker kick)	Texas 21–7

Texas' annual Orange-White spring game was set for April 16 at the Longhorns' home field in Austin, Texas; this placed the game 141 days before Texas' first official game against Notre Dame. Although the game was scheduled to play out over four quarters, inclement weather forced the spring game to end after halftime. Throughout the game, the 'Texas' team represented the first-team, while the 'Horns' represented the second-team. The spring game featured the hurry-up offensive scheme introduced by new offensive coordinator Sterlin Gilbert.

The Texas side of the game began with the football to start the game, and were eventually stopped by the Horns defense to a punt following a three-and-out. Quarterback Shane Buechele threw a 27-yard pass to Armanti Foreman on the ensuing drive to score a touchdown for the Horns; running back Chris Warren III would run a 51-yard touchdown on the following drive roughly a minute later for Texas, tying the game at 7–7 to end the first quarter. The five subsequent drives ended without any scores, though one drive ended in a failed 46-yard field goal attempt from Mitchel Becker. In the second quarter, Texas would score two additional touchdowns on a run from D'Onta Foreman and a long pass from Shane Buechele to John Burt; following the last touchdown of the game, both teams turned the ball over via an interception and a fumble. At halftime, Charlie Strong ended the spring game due to worsening weather conditions, concluding a 21–7 victory for the Texas team.

=== Fall practice ===
Camp practices in the leadup to the 2016 football season began on August 6. During fall practice, former starting quarterback Jerrod Heard was moved to the wide receiver position.

== Recruiting ==
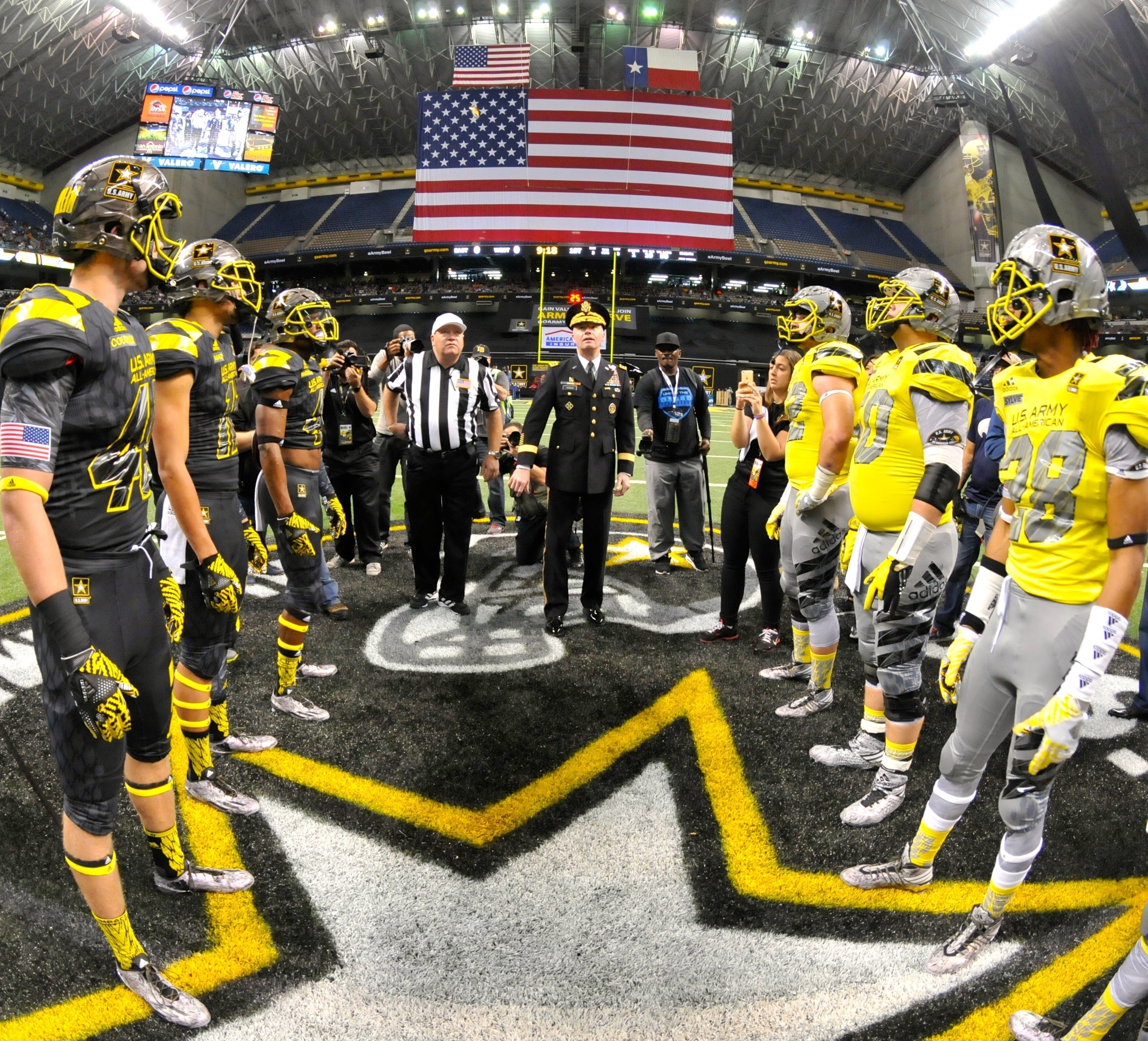
Three of Texas' eventual recruits played at the 2016 U.S. Army All-American Bowl on January 9, 2016

Following the 2016 recruiting cycle, a total of 28 players signed their National Letter of Intent to become a part of the 2016 Texas Longhorns football team. Prior to National Signing Day on February 3, 2016, 17 players had pledged their commitments to the Longhorns, while four of these players became early enrollees at the beginning of the 2015-16 spring semester. Of the 28 recruited players, all are from high schools in the United States, with none originating from other countries or from junior colleges. Of Texas' recruits, 23 were from Texas, 4 were from Louisiana, and 1 was from California. Collin Johnson committed to the Longhorns on April 17, 2014, becoming the first player to announce their commitment to the team. As the final previously-uncommitted Texas recruit to submit his letter of intent on National Signing Day, Jordan Elliot initially became the final recruit of the 2016 class on February 3, 2016. However, offensive guard Patrick Hudson would later sign is letter of intent well after National Signing Day on June 29. Two players announced their commitments in 2014, while ten did so in 2015. Five additional players committed to Texas in 2016 prior to National Signing Day, with another four uncommitted players signing their letters of intent in June 2016. Thirteen of Texas' recruits primarily served as offensive players, while another thirteen primarily served as defensive players. Two additional recruits, Lil'Jordan Humphrey and Donovan Duvernay, were recruited as a general purpose athlete.

On January 2, 2016, offensive tackle prospect Jean Delance of Mesquite, Texas announced his commitment to the Longhorns during the 2016 Under Armour All-America Game. On the weekend of January 16–17, Texas hosted 19 prospective and committed players on official visits to the campus; of the 19 prospects, the Longhorns would eventually sign 15 recruits. Shortly afterwards, former longtime Kansas State commit Zach Shackelford, an offensive linesmen, flipped his commitment to the Longhorns. Two days later, Shackelford, along with three other Longhorns recruits, became early enrollees as Texas for the school year's spring semester; as a result, all four were eligible for spring practice with the Longhorns football team in 2016. On January 24, former cornerback prospect Obi Eboh dropped his commitment to Texas, instead opting to sign with Stanford. On National Signing Day, seven players announced their commitment to the Texas football team and faxed their letters of intent. According to ESPN's metrics, Texas' recruiting class had climbed over 20 spots to hold a top 10 ranking following the prolific recruiting day. Among these recruits was runningback Erick Fowler, who had been committed to Louisiana State (LSU) up until National Signing Day. Following National Signing Day, Texas' 2016 recruiting class was ranked as the 13th, 10th, 13th, and 8th best in the country by 247Sports.com, ESPN, Rivals.com, and Scout.com, respectively. All four recruiting services listed Texas as having the best 2016 recruiting class in the Big 12 Conference. After additional recruits signed in June 2016, Texas' recruiting class was ranked 9th, 7th, and 3rd by 247Sports.com, Rivals.com, and Scout.com, respectively.

In June 2016, the firing of then-Baylor head coach Art Briles in the aftermath of the Baylor University football scandal resulted in four players formerly committed to Baylor signing with the Texas football team; the players were able to change schools after Baylor failed to submit their national letters of intent to Big 12 Conference offices, allowing the players to request a release from the letter.

Both 247Sports.com and Scout.com listed safety Brandon Jones of Nacogdoches High School as Texas' highest rated recruit; both services considered Jones to be the best safety prospect in the United States for 2016. According to ESPN, Texas' highest rated recruit was linebacker prospect Jeffrey McCulloch; fourteen of Texas' twenty-eight recruits, including McCulloch, were listed on the ESPN 300, which listed the 300 top recruiting prospects nationwide according to the network's metrics. Rivals.com listed linebacker and former LSU-commit Erick Fowler as Texas' top recruit for 2016. Several Texas recruits received various accolades during the 2016 recruiting cycle. Quarterback Shane Buechele was one of 18 quarterbacks who participated in the 2016 Elite 11 quarterback competition; Buechele also participated in Nike's The Opening alongside future Texas recruits Eric Cuffee, Erick Fowler, and Jeffrey McCulloch. Three players formed a part of the 2016 U.S. Army All-American Bowl, while four participated in the 2016 Under Armour All-America Game; another three recruits played in the 2016 Semper Fidelis All-American Bowl.

=== Recruits ===
College recruiting (2016)
Name	Hometown	School	Height	Weight	40^{‡}	Commit date
Peyton Aucoin; TE	New Orleans, Louisiana	Brother Martin HS	6 ft 5 in (1.96 m)	250 lb (110 kg)	4.84	Jul 24, 2015
Peyton Aucoin; TE	Recruit ratings: Scout: Rivals: 247Sports: (78)					
Demarco Boyd; LB	Gilmer, Texas	Gilmer HS	6 ft 0 in (1.83 m)	222 lb (101 kg)	4.8	Jan 30, 2015
Demarco Boyd; LB	Recruit ratings: Scout: Rivals: 247Sports: (78)					
Chris Brown; S	Houston, Texas	Elsik HS	5 ft 11 in (1.80 m)	185 lb (84 kg)	4.49	Feb 3, 2016
Chris Brown; S	Recruit ratings: Scout: Rivals: 247Sports: (79)					
Shane Buechele; QB	Arlington, Texas	Lamar HS	6 ft 2 in (1.88 m)	185 lb (84 kg)	4.83	Feb 23, 2015
Shane Buechele; QB	Recruit ratings: Scout: Rivals: 247Sports: (81)					
D'Andre Christmas-Giles; DT	New Orleans, Louisiana	St. Augustine HS	6 ft 3 in (1.91 m)	289 lb (131 kg)	5.64	Feb 23, 2015
D'Andre Christmas-Giles; DT	Recruit ratings: Scout: Rivals: 247Sports: (81)					
Eric Cuffee; CB	Waco, Texas	Waco HS	6 ft 0 in (1.83 m)	189 lb (86 kg)	4.5	Feb 3, 2016
Eric Cuffee; CB	Recruit ratings: Scout: Rivals: 247Sports: (83)					
Davion Curtis; WR	Temple, Texas	Temple HS	5 ft 11 in (1.80 m)	179 lb (81 kg)	4.45	Nov 19, 2015
Davion Curtis; WR	Recruit ratings: Scout: Rivals: 247Sports: (79)					
Chris Daniels; DT	Euless, Texas	Trinity HS	6 ft 4 in (1.93 m)	300 lb (140 kg)	5.09	Feb 3, 2016
Chris Daniels; DT	Recruit ratings: Scout: Rivals: 247Sports: (83)					
Jean Delance; OT	Mesquite, Texas	Mesquite HS	6 ft 5 in (1.96 m)	278 lb (126 kg)	–	Jan 2, 2016
Jean Delance; OT	Recruit ratings: Scout: Rivals: 247Sports: (83)					
Devin Duvernay; WR	Sachse, Texas	Sasche HS	5 ft 11 in (1.80 m)	194 lb (88 kg)	4.32	Jun 22, 2016
Devin Duvernay; WR	Recruit ratings: Scout: Rivals: 247Sports: (86)					
Donovan Duvernay; ATH	Sasche, Texas	Sachse HS	5 ft 9 in (1.75 m)	179 lb (81 kg)	4.50	Jun 25, 2016
Donovan Duvernay; ATH	Recruit ratings: Scout: Rivals: 247Sports: (78)					
Jordan Elliott; DT	Houston, Texas	Westside HS	6 ft 4 in (1.93 m)	302 lb (137 kg)	5.1	Feb 3, 2016
Jordan Elliott; DT	Recruit ratings: Scout: Rivals: 247Sports: (84)					
Andrew Fitzgerald; DE	Flower Mound, Texas	Marcus HS	6 ft 5 in (1.96 m)	186 lb (84 kg)	4.90	Nov 12, 2015
Andrew Fitzgerald; DE	Recruit ratings: Scout: Rivals: 247Sports: (78)					
Erick Fowler; LB	Manor, Texas	Manor HS	6 ft 2 in (1.88 m)	232 lb (105 kg)	4.81	Feb 3, 2016
Erick Fowler; LB	Recruit ratings: Scout: Rivals: 247Sports: (83)					
Reggie Hemphill-Mapps; WR	Manvel, Texas	Manvel HS	6 ft 1 in (1.85 m)	173 lb (78 kg)	4.50	Oct 4, 2015
Reggie Hemphill-Mapps; WR	Recruit ratings: Scout: Rivals: 247Sports: (80)					
Patrick Hudson; OG	Silsbee, Texas	Silsbee HS	6 ft 5 in (1.96 m)	326 lb (148 kg)	–	Jun 29, 2016
Patrick Hudson; OG	Recruit ratings: Scout: Rivals: 247Sports: (85)					
Lil'Jordan Humphrey; ATH	Southlake, Texas	Carroll HS	6 ft 4 in (1.93 m)	198 lb (90 kg)	4.55	Jan 30, 2016
Lil'Jordan Humphrey; ATH	Recruit ratings: Scout: Rivals: 247Sports: (78)					
Tope Imade; OG	Arlington, Texas	Bowie HS	6 ft 5 in (1.96 m)	326 lb (148 kg)	5.64	May 26, 2015
Tope Imade; OG	Recruit ratings: Scout: Rivals: 247Sports: (79)					
Collin Johnson; WR	San Jose, California	Valley Christian HS	6 ft 5 in (1.96 m)	198 lb (90 kg)	4.70	Apr 17, 2014
Collin Johnson; WR	Recruit ratings: Scout: Rivals: 247Sports: (80)					
Brandon Jones; S	Nacogdoches, Texas	Nacogdoches HS	5 ft 11 in (1.80 m)	190 lb (86 kg)	4.5	Feb 3, 2016
Brandon Jones; S	Recruit ratings: Scout: Rivals: 247Sports: (85)					
Jeffrey McCulloch; LB	Aldine, Texas	Davis HS	6 ft 3 in (1.91 m)	230 lb (100 kg)	4.77	Feb 3, 2016
Jeffrey McCulloch; LB	Recruit ratings: Scout: Rivals: 247Sports: (87)					
Denzel Okafor; OG	Lewisville, Texas	Brother Martin HS	6 ft 4 in (1.93 m)	291 lb (132 kg)	5.20	Nov 14, 2015
Denzel Okafor; OG	Recruit ratings: Scout: Rivals: 247Sports: (81)					
Kyle Porter; RB	Katy, Texas	Katy High School	5 ft 11 in (1.80 m)	195 lb (88 kg)	4.49	Feb 3, 2016
Kyle Porter; RB	Recruit ratings: Scout: Rivals: 247Sports: (81)					
Malcolm Roach; DE	Baton Rouge, Louisiana	Madison Prep Academy	6 ft 3 in (1.91 m)	259 lb (117 kg)	4.85	Nov 6, 2015
Malcolm Roach; DE	Recruit ratings: Scout: Rivals: 247Sports: (77)					
Zach Shackelford; OG	Belton, Texas	Belton HS	6 ft 4 in (1.93 m)	283 lb (128 kg)	5.60	Jan 17, 2016
Zach Shackelford; OG	Recruit ratings: Scout: Rivals: 247Sports: (78)					
Marcell Southall; DT	Duncanville, Texas	Duncanville High School	6 ft 3 in (1.91 m)	274 lb (124 kg)	5.0	Feb 3, 2016
Marcell Southall; DT	Recruit ratings: Scout: Rivals: 247Sports: (81)					
J.P. Urquidez; OT	Copperas Cove, Texas	Copperas Cove HS	6 ft 6 in (1.98 m)	299 lb (136 kg)	–	Jun 25, 2016
J.P. Urquidez; OT	Recruit ratings: Scout: Rivals: 247Sports: (82)					
Gerald Wilbon; DT	Destrehan, Louisiana	Destrehan HS	6 ft 3 in (1.91 m)	310 lb (140 kg)	5.64	Jun 17, 2015
Gerald Wilbon; DT	Recruit ratings: Scout: Rivals: 247Sports: (79)					
Overall recruit ranking: Scout: 30 Rivals: 42 247Sports: 32 ESPN: 33
‡ Refers to 40-yard dash; Note: In many cases, Scout, Rivals, 247Sports, On3, and ESPN may conflict in their listings of height, weight and 40 time.; In these cases, the average was taken. ESPN grades are on a 100-point scale.; Sources: "2016 Texas Football Commitment List". Rivals.; "Texas College Football Recruiting Commits (2016)". Scout.; "2016 Texas Longhorns Recruiting Class". ESPN.; "Scout.com Team Recruiting Rankings". Scout.; "2016 Team Ranking". Rivals.com.; "2016 Texas Football Commits". 247Sports.

== Personnel ==
A search for a new Texas offensive coordinator in December 2015 concluded with the official hiring of former Tulsa co-offensive coordinator Sterlin Gilbert on December 12, 2015 as both an offensive coordinator and quarterbacks' coach. As part of the negotiations, Matt Mattox, the former Tulsa offensive line coach, was also named to the same position at Texas. Both coaches were given three-year coaching contracts, with Gilbert and Mattox awarded $850,000 and $550,000 annual salaries, respectively. The move implicated the release of Shawn Watson and Joe Wickline, who had occupied the newly changed coaching positions since 2014. Jay Norvell, who had served as a co-offensive coordinator for much of the 2015 season, became solely a wide receivers' coach following the coaching changes.

On December 26, 2015, Texas defensive tackle Hassan Ridgeway declared for the 2016 NFL draft, thus forgoing his fourth year as part of the Longhorns football team. Jermaine Roberts, a cornerback recruit for Texas in 2014, announced his transfer from the Texas football team in February 2016; former Longhorns defensive backs Adrian Colbert and Bryson Echols similarly announced to transfer from the university in February. In addition to Texas' 2016 recruiting class, former LSU placekicker and 2015 Lou Groza Award semifinalist Trent Domingue signed a financial aid agreement to join the Texas football program as a graduate transfer on July 24, 2016.

=== Roster ===
2016 Texas Longhorns football team roster
Players
Coaches
Offense

Pos.	#	Name	Class
WR	1	John Burt	So
WR	2	Devin Duvernay	Fr
WR	3	Armanti Foreman
WR	4	Lil'Jordan Humphrey	Fr
WR	5	Lorenzo Joe	Jr
WR	6	Jake Oliver	Jr
QB	7	Shane Buechele	Fr
WR	8	Dorian Leonard	Jr
WR	9	Collin Johnson	Fr
QB	11	Logan Vinklarek	Jr
WR	11	Jacorey Warrick	Sr
WR, QB	13	Jerrod Heard	So
WR	14	Kai Locksley	Fr
QB	15	Trey Holtz	Sr
QB	17	Jimmy Greenwood	Jr
QB	18	Tyrone Swoopes	Sr
QB	19	Matthew Merrick	Fr
RB	21	Kyle Porter	Fr
RB	25	Chris Warren III	So
RB	27	Roderick Bernard	Jr
WR	27	Connor Huffman	Jr
RB	28	Kirk Johnson	So
WR	29	Josh Covey	Fr
RB	30	Tim Yoder	So
RB	33	D'Onta Foreman	Jr
WR	36	Eric Gonzalez	Fr
RB	40	Trenton Hafley	So
RB	41	Tristian Houston	Fr
TE	42	Caleb Bluiett	Sr
TE	43	Robert Willis	Jr
TE	44	Quincy Vasser	Sr
TE	47	Andrew Beck	Jr
OL	51	Terrell Cuney	So
OL	54	Garrett Graf	Jr
OL	55	Connor Williams	So
OL	56	Zach Shackelford	Fr
OL	58	Brandon Hodges	Jr
OL	59	Michael Welsh	So
OL	63	Alex Anderson	So
OL	64	Jake McMillon	So
OL	67	Tope Imade	Fr
OL	68	Frank Lopez	Sr
OL	69	Austin Allsup	So
OL	70	Buck Major	Fr
OL	71	J.P. Urquidez	Fr
OL	72	Elijah Rodriguez	So
OL	73	Patrick Hudson	Fr
OL	74	Jean Delance	Fr
OT	75	Tristan Nickelson	Jr
G, OT	76	Kent Perkins	Sr
OL	77	Patrick Vahe	So
OL	78	Denzel Okafor	Fr
OL	79	Garrett Thomas	Fr
TE	80	Blake Whiteley	Jr
WR	81	Ryan Roberts	Jr
WR	82	Reggie Hemphill-Mapps	Fr
WR	82	Michael Wilson	So
TE	83	Matt Center	Jr
WR	83	John Thomas Hildebrand	Fr
WR	84	Davion Curtis	Fr
WR	85	Philipp Moeller	So
TE	87	Garrett Gray	So
TE	88	Peyton Aucoin	Fr
WR	88	Ty Templin	Sr
TE	89	Chris Fehr	So

Defense

Pos.	#	Name	Class
CB	1	Sheroid Evans	Sr
CB	2	Kris Boyd	So
S	4	DeShon Elliott	So
DB	5	Holton Hill	So
CB	9	Davante Davis	So
S	11	P. J. Locke	So
S	14	Dylan Haines	Sr
DB	15	Chris Brown	Fr
S	18	Kevin Vaccaro	Sr
DB	19	Brandon Jones	Fr
LB	23	Jeffrey McCulloch	Fr
DB	23	Jordan Strickland	So
CB	24	John Bonney	So
CB	25	Antwuan Davis	Jr
DB	26	Eric Cuffee	Fr
DB	27	Donovan Duvernay	Fr
DB	28	Jarmarquis Durst	Jr
LB	30	Timothy Cole	Sr
S	31	Jason Hall	Jr
LB	31	Kyle Hrncir	Fr
OLB	32	Malcolm Roach	Fr
DB	33	Trevor Carr	Fr
LB	35	Edwin Freeman	So
LB	36	Demarco Boyd	Fr
LB	37	Johnny Tseng	Sr
DB	38	Caden Forisha	Fr
LB	39	Edward Pequeno	Fr
LS	39	Michael David Poujol	Fr
DE, OLB	40	Naashon Hughes	Jr
OLB	41	Erick Fowler	Fr
LB	42	Jay Harper	So
LB	43	Cameron Townsend	Fr
DE, OLB	44	Breckyn Hager	So
LB	45	Anthony Wheeler	So
LB	46	Malik Jefferson	So
DL	48	Andrew Fitzgerald	Fr
DS	53	Jak Holbrook	So
DL	55	Jordan Elliott	Fr
DT	61	Alex Mercado	Sr
DT	62	Patrick Ojeaga	So
DE	87	David Gonzalez	Jr
DE	90	Charles Omenihu	So
DE	91	Bryce Cottrell	Sr
DT	93	Paul Boyette Jr.	Sr
DL	94	Gerald Wilbon	Fr
DT	95	Poona Ford	Jr
DL	96	Marcel Southall	Fr
DT	97	Chris Nelson	So
DL	98	D'Andre Christmas	Fr
DL	99	Chris Daniels	Fr

Special teams

Pos.	#	Name	Class
P	13	Michael Dickson	So
K	17	Trent Domingue	Sr
PK	35	Jon Coppens	Fr
PK	37	Evan Moore	So
P	38	Mitchell Becker	Jr
P	49	Matthew Sims	Jr

Head coach

- Charlie Strong

Coordinators/assistant coaches

- Vance Bedford (Defensive coordinator, secondary)
- Sterlin Gilbert (Offensive coordinator, quarterbacks)
- Brick Haley (defensive line)
- Brian Jean-Mary (Linebackers, recruiting coordinator)
- Clay Jennings (defensive backs)
- Anthony Johnson (running backs)
- Matt Mattox (offensive line)
- Jeff Traylor (Tight ends, special teams)
- Charlie Williams (special teams)

Legend

- (C) Team captain
- (S) Suspended
- (I) Ineligible
- Injured
- Redshirt

Roster
Last update: September 5, 2016

=== Returning starters ===
Texas' 2016 team will feature seven offensive players and ten defensive players that started games for the team in 2015, as well as punter Michael Dickson. In addition, fifteen other players that saw substantial playing time in 2015 are set to return as part of the Longhorns in 2016. According to ESPN, the total number of combined starts among Texas players returning in 2016 was 310, with 111 of those starts from returning offensive players and 119 from defensive players; Texas' 310 combined starts ranked third among teams in the Big 12.

==== Offense ====
Returning Texas offensive starters, 2016
Name	Class	Position
Jerrod Heard	Sophomore	Quarterback (Note: Jerrod Heard started 10 games as a quarterback for the Longhorns in 2015, but was moved to wide receiver during 2016 fall practices.)
John Burt	Sophomore	Wide receiver
Armanti Foreman	Junior	Wide receiver
Andrew Beck	Junior	Tight end
Connor William	Sophomore	Offensive tackle
Patrick Vahe	Sophomore	Offensive guard
Kent Perkins	Senior	Offensive Tackle

==== Defense ====
Returning Texas defensive starters, 2016
Name	Class	Position
Bryce Cottrell	Senior	Defensive end
Paul Boyette	Senior	Defensive tackle
Poona Ford	Junior	Defensive tackle
Malik Jefferson	Sophomore	Linebacker
Davante Davis	Sophomore	Cornerback
Holton Hill	Sophomore	Cornerback
Antwuan Davis	Junior	Cornerback
Dylan Haines	Senior	Safety
Jason Hall	Junior	Safety
John Bonney	Sophomore	Nickelback

==== Special teams ====
Returning Texas special teams starters, 2016
Name	Class	Position
Michael Dickson	Sophomore	Punter

=== Award watch lists ===
In addition to individual awards, linebacker Malik Jefferson was named to Sporting News' Preseason All-American first team on July 1. Jefferson was also named to the Preseason All-Big 12 team on July 13, alongside cornerback Davante Davis and offensive linesmen Patrick Vahe and Connor Williams. The Big 12 also identified Jefferson as the Big 12 Preseason Defensive Player of the Year.

- Walter Camp Award

Malik Jefferson

- Doak Walker Award

D'Onta Foreman
Chris Warren III

- Outland Trophy

Connor Williams

- Bednarik Award

Malik Jefferson

- Bronco Nagurski Award

Malik Jefferson

- Butkus Award

Malik Jefferson

=== Depth chart ===
Defense

FS
Jason Hall
DeShon Elliott
Brandon Jones

WLB	MLB	SLB
Anthony Wheeler	Malik Jefferson	Edwin Freeman
Edwin Freeman	Tim Cole	Cameron Townsend
Jeffrey McCulloch	⋅	⋅

SS
Dylan Haines
Kevin Vaccaro
John Bonney

CB
Davante Davis
Sheroid Evans
⋅

DE	DT	DT	DE
Naashon Hughes	Poona Ford	Paul Boyette	Charles Omenihu
Breckyn Hager	Gerald Wilbon	Chris Nelson	Bryce Cottrell
Malcolm Roach	⋅	D'Andre Christmas	Jordan Elliott

CB
Holton Hill
Kris Boyd
⋅

Offense

OWR
John Burt
Dorian Leonard
Lil'Jordan Humphrey

IWR
Jake Oliver
Jerrod Heard
⋅

LT	LG	C	RG	RT
Connor Williams	Patrick Vahe	Zach Shackelford	Kent Perkins	Brandon Hodges
Jean Delance	Elijah Rodriguez	Jake McMillon	Alex Anderson	Trent Nickelson
⋅	⋅	⋅	⋅	Denzel Okafor

IWR
Jacorey Warrick
Devin Duvernay
⋅

OWR
Armanti Foreman
Collin Johnson
Lil'Jordan Humphrey

QB
Shane Buechele
Tyrone Swoopes
⋅

Key reserves
P.J. Locke (Nickelback)
Antwuan Davis (Nickelback)

RB
D'Onta Foreman
Chris Warren III
Kyle Porter

Special teams
PK Trent Domingue
PK Mitchell Becker (kickoffs)
P Michael Dickson
KR Kris Boyd, Jacorey Warrick
PR Jacorey Warrick, Holton Hill
LS Jak Holbrook, Michael David Poujol
H Trey Holtz

== Schedule ==
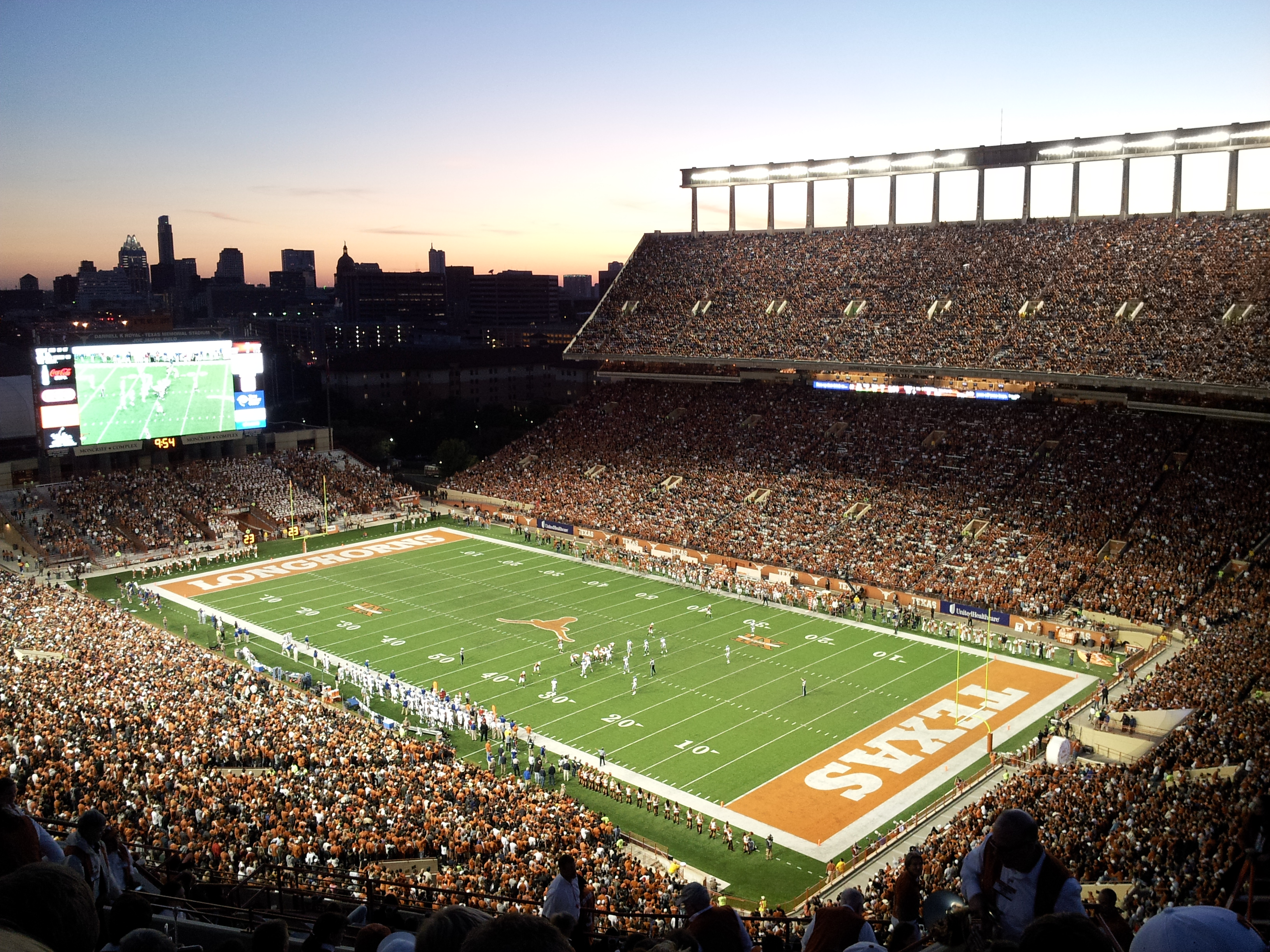
Darrell K Royal–Texas Memorial Stadium, where Texas plays its home games

Texas will play its first three games against teams outside the Big 12; two of these will be at home and one will be played away. The opening game against Notre Dame will be the second consecutive year in which the two teams have played as part of a scheduling agreement made in 2010. Although the game was initially scheduled on September 3, in April 2016 the game was moved to the following day to maximize national coverage. Similarly, a deal made in 2009 pits Texas and California Golden Bears football in a non-conference game, while the game between Texas and the University of Texas at El Paso (UTEP) replaces an initially scheduled home-and-home series between Texas and Minnesota.

On November 24, 2015, the Big 12 released its tentative schedule for intra-conference games, occupying the remaining nine games on Texas' schedule; four of these games are to be played at home, four away, and one game, the Red River Showdown, will be played in Dallas, Texas. Although the Red River Showdown is set to take place on a team-neutral field, Oklahoma is designated as the home team on even-numbered years; thus, Texas will serve as the away team during the 2016 edition of the rivalry game. Conference games are set to be played in a round-robin format, and thus all Big 12 teams will face all other teams within the conference. Kickoff times for Texas' games against UTEP, California, and TCU were released by the conference on June 1.

The Longhorns will play on consecutive weeks from September 4 to November 24 with the exception of the week of September 24, which serves as a bye week. In addition, Texas will not play a game on the week of December 3 in contrast to six other Big 12 teams. All games will be played on Saturday except for the game against Notre Dame, which will be played on Sunday, and the game against TCU, which will be played on a Friday. The game between Texas and TCU was initially scheduled for Thanksgiving, but was rescheduled for November 25 in February 2016; Texas had switched between playing TCU or Texas Tech on Thanksgiving after Texas A&M left the Big 12 for the Southeastern Conference (SEC) in 2012.

Date	Time	Opponent	Rank	Site	TV	Result	Attendance
September 4	6:30 p.m.	No. 10 Notre Dame*		Darrell K Royal–Texas Memorial Stadium; Austin, TX	ABC	W 50–47 ^{2OT}	102,315^{‡}
September 10	6:00 p.m.	UTEP*	No. 11	Darrell K Royal–Texas Memorial Stadium; Austin, TX	LHN	W 41–7	92,683
September 17	9:30 p.m.	at California*	No. 11	California Memorial Stadium; Berkeley, CA	ESPN	L 43–50	50,448
October 1	11:00 a.m.	at Oklahoma State	No. 22	Boone Pickens Stadium; Stillwater, OK	ABC	L 31–49	53,468
October 8	11:00 a.m.	vs. No. 20 Oklahoma		Cotton Bowl; Dallas, TX (Red River Rivalry)	FS1	L 40–45	92,100
October 15	6:00 p.m.	Iowa State		Darrell K Royal–Texas Memorial Stadium; Austin, TX	LHN	W 27–6	96,851
October 22	11:00 a.m.	at Kansas State		Bill Snyder Family Football Stadium; Manhattan	ESPN2	L 21–24	52,328
October 29	2:30 p.m.	No. 8 Baylor		Darrell K Royal–Texas Memorial Stadium; Austin, TX (rivalry)	ABC	W 35–34	97,822
November 5	11:00 a.m.	at Texas Tech		Jones AT&T Stadium; Lubbock (Chancellor's Spurs)	FS1	W 45–37	60,803
November 12	11:00 a.m.	No. 11 West Virginia		Darrell K Royal–Texas Memorial Stadium; Austin, TX	FS1	L 20–24	96,367
November 19	2:30 p.m.	at Kansas		Memorial Stadium; Lawrence, KS	ABC	L 21–24 ^{OT}	25,673
November 25	2:30 p.m.	TCU		Darrell K Royal–Texas Memorial Stadium; Austin, TX (rivalry)	FS1	L 9–31	99,065
*Non-conference game; Rankings from AP Poll released prior to game; All times are in Central time

- ^‡Largest attendance recorded at Darrell K Royal–Texas Memorial Stadium. The record would later be broken on September 15, 2018 with an attendance of 103,507 against USC.

=== Media affiliates ===
Texas' flagship radio station is KTXX-FM ("The Horn", 104.9 FM) based in Austin, Texas. Fourteen other FM stations and twenty-one AM stations cover UT's football games around Texas, while a pair of FM and AM stations based in Austin cover Texas games in Spanish. Texas Longhorns football games are broadcast via satellite radio on Sirius channel 117, XM channel 202, and SiriusXM channel 969.

On June 1, the Big 12 announced that the Red River Rivalry game between Texas and Oklahoma would be televised by Fox Sports 1, making it the first time since 1998 that a FOX-affiliated channel covered the game; between 1998 and 2016, the American Broadcasting Company (ABC) carried the rivalry game.

== Rankings ==
The preseason Coaches Poll was released on August 4, 2016, with Texas outside of the top 25 but receiving 34 points; this marked the first time the Longhorns appeared in any of the major ranking polls since Week 7 of 2015. Similarly, the preseason AP Poll, released on August 21, 2016, placed Texas outside of the top 25 but awarded the Longhorns 12 points. In both polls, Texas was the fifth highest ranked team in the Big 12. Following a victory against Notre Dame in the season opener, the Longhorns were ranked in the top-25 for the first time since December 2013. Texas moved from an unranked position to 11th in the AP Poll, marking the highest rank given to Texas by the poll since October 2012.

Ranking movements Legend: ██ Increase in ranking ██ Decrease in ranking — = Not ranked RV = Received votes
	Week															
Poll	Pre	1	2	3	4	5	6	7	8	9	10	11	12	13	14	Final
AP	RV	11	11	21	22	RV	—	—	—	—	—	—	—	—	—	—
Coaches	RV	20	16	24	25	—	—	—	—	—	—	—	—	—	—	—
CFP	Not released									—	—	—	—	—	—	Not released

== Game summaries ==
=== Week 1: vs. No. 10 Notre Dame ===
Texas vs. Notre Dame

Team	1	2	3	4	OT	2OT	Total
No. 10 Notre Dame (ND)	7	7	14	9	7	3	47
• Texas (TEX)	7	14	10	6	7	6	50

- Date: September 4, 2016
- Location: Austin, Texas
- Game start: 6:42 p.m. CDT
- Elapsed time: 4:00
- Game attendance: 102,315
- Game weather: Mostly cloudy; 91 °F (33 °C); wind SE at 8 mph (13 km/h)
- Referee: Gary Patterson
- TV announcers (ABC): Joe Tessitore, Todd Blackledge, Holly Rowe

Scoring summary
1	12:28	ND	St. Brown 13-yard pass from Kizer (Yoon kick)	ND 7–0
1	9:30	TEX	Foreman 19-yard pass from Buechele (Domingue kick)	7–7
2	7:13	TEX	Buechele 1-yard run (Domingue kick)	TEX 7–14
2	3:44	ND	St. Brown 30-yard pass from Kizer (Yoon kick)	14–14
2	1:12	TEX	Swoopes 1-yard run (Domingue kick)	TEX 14–21
3	14:29	TEX	Burt 72-yard pass from Buechele (Domingue kick)	TEX 14–28
3	9:14	TEX	Domingue 25-yard field goal	TEX 14–31
3	7:39	ND	Kizer 29-yard run (Yoon kick)	TEX 21–31
3	1:12	ND	Hunter 5-yard pass from Kizer (Yoon kick)	TEX 28–31
4	10:57	ND	Adams 17-yard pass from Kizer (Yoon kick)	ND 35–31
4	3:29	TEX	Foreman 19-yard run (Domingue kick blocked)	TEX 35–37
4	3:29	ND	Crawford 98-yard point-after-touchdown return	37–37
OT1	–	TEX	Swoopes 3-yard run (Domingue kick)	TEX 37–44
OT1	–	ND	Sanders 25-yard pass from Kizer	44–44
OT2	–	ND	Yoon 39-yard field goal	ND 47–44
OT2	–	TEX	Swoopes 6-yard run	TEX 44–50

Leading up to Texas' opening game against Notre Dame, the Fighting Irish were favored to win by three to four points. The game between Texas and Notre Dame was to be the debut of Bevo XV, the fifteenth of a succession of live Texas longhorn mascots that traditionally appear at Texas' football games. Shortly before the game, Texas' depth chart was released, indicating that both quarterbacks Tyrone Swoopes and Shane Buechele would share playing time, though Buechele was reportedly expected to start at the position. Buechele became the first true freshman to start for Texas in a season opener since 1944. At the game, 102,315 people were in attendance at Darrell K. Royal–Texas Memorial Stadium, setting an attendance record for the venue and beating the former record of 101,851 set during the 2012 game between Texas and West Virginia.

The game began with Texas kicking off to Notre Dame, after which the Fighting Irish were able to score on their first possession following a 54-yard run by running back Tarean Folston and a 13-yard touchdown pass from DeShone Kizer to wide receiver Equanimeous St. Brown. The Longhorns would also score a touchdown on their ensuing drive, scoring off of a 19-yard pass from Shane Buechele to wide receiver Armanti Foreman; a string of three-and-outs by both teams kept the score at 7–7 by the end of the first quarter. In the second quarter, both Texas quarterbacks Buechele and Swoopes capped off scoring drive with 1-yard touchdown runs, while Notre Dame scored one touchdown in the quarter on another touchdown pass from Kizer to St. Brown. At the end of the first half, the Longhorns led 21–14.

Notre Dame kicked off to Texas to begin the second half, with the Longhorns quickly scoring just two plays later on a long 72-yard pass from Buechele to wide receiver John Burt. A forced three-and-out by the Texas defense allowed Texas to regain possession and gain a 17-point lead after a 25-yard field goal by recently transferred placekicker Trent Domingue. Despite the double-digit lead, the Fighting Irish would score 21 unanswered points in the third and fourth quarters off of two passing and one rushing touchdown orchestrated by Kizer; an additional 3 points were prevented after defensive end Naashon Hughes blocked a field goal attempt by Justin Yoon at the end of the third quarter. Following these scores, Notre Dame would lead 35–31 after having trailed since the end of the first half. Texas regained the lead late in the fourth quarter on a 19-yard touchdown by running back D'Onta Foreman; however, the subsequent point after touchdown (PAT) attempt was blocked by Notre Dame and returned 98 yards for a defensive PAT, tying the game at 37–37. The three ensuing drives ended in no scores, leaving the game tied in regulation and bringing the game into overtime. Texas began the overtime period on offense and were able to score a touchdown via a 3-yard touchdown run by Swoopes; Notre Dame quickly responded with a 25-yard screen pass from Kizer to receiver C. J. Sanders to tie the game at 44–44. In second overtime, the Longhorns defense held the Fighting Irish to a 39-yard field goal. With Texas now only in need of a touchdown to win the game, Swoopes scored on a 6-yard touchdown run after six consecutive rushing plays, ending the game in a 50–47 Longhorns victory.

The 97 combined points were the sixth-most in Longhorns history and were capped by only the third overtime game and second overtime victory in the program's history. The win also marked the first win against a top-10 ranked team at home since 2008 and their first win against such a team in week one since 1983. The game's telecast on ABC/ESPN garnered a 7.0 television rating, becoming the network's second most viewed opening game in addition to breaking viewer records for opening games in seven television markets. In addition, the game's broadcast broke average minute audience, unique viewer, and total minutes watched records on WatchESPN, ESPN's Internet streaming service. The game is also notable for the commentary on the game-winning score by Joe Tessitore in which he proclaimed "Texas is back, folks!" With the victory, Texas moved to 1–0 for the year.

=== Week 2 (vs. UTEP) ===
Texas vs. University of Texas-El Paso

Team	1	2	3	4	Total
UTEP	0	7	0	0	7
• #11 Texas (TEX)	10	10	14	7	41

- Date: September 10, 2016
- Location: Austin, Texas
- Game start: 6:05 p.m. CDT
- Elapsed time: 3:23
- Game attendance: 92,863
- Game weather: Partly cloudy; 98 °F (37 °C); wind N at 7 mph (11 km/h)
- Referee: Reggie Smith
- TV announcers (LHN): Lowell Galindo, Keith Moreland, Ahmad Brooks, Dawn Davenport

Scoring summary
1	9:32	TEX	Heard 29-yard pass from Buechele (Domingue kick)	TEX 0–7
1	0:39	TEX	Domingue 22-yard field goal	TEX 0–10
2	8:28	UTEP	Jones 51-yard run (Mattox kick)	TEX 7–10
2	4:42	TEX	Domingue 43-yard field goal	TEX 7–13
2	1:22	TEX	Warrick 8-yard pass from Buechele (Domingue kick)	TEX 7–20
3	8:09	TEX	Warren III 1-yard run (Domingue kick)	TEX 7–27
3	6:07	TEX	Leonard 46-yard pass from Buechele (Domingue kick)	TEX 7–34
4	9:30	TEX	Heard 7-yard pass from Buechele (Domingue kick)	TEX 7–41

Entering week 2, Texas was favored to win by roughly 30 points against UTEP, and began a game as a ranked team for the first time in Charlie Strong's tenure at Texas. The game started with the Longhorns kicking off to UTEP, though the Miners' first three drives ended in three-in-outs, with the Texas defense holding UTEP to 8 total yards on those drives. A touchdown pass by Buechele on Texas' first offensive possession was negated after wide receiver Jacorey Warrick fumbled the ball just before crossing the end zone, resulting in a touchback and awarding UTEP with possession of the ball. A subsequent 29-yard touchdown pass by Buechele to Heard marked the first score of the game. Later in the first quarter, a UTEP punt was blocked by defensive back Brandon Jones, leading to a Longhorns field goal to put Texas up 10–7 at the end of the first quarter. The blocked punt was Texas' first since their 2012 game against Texas Tech. At the beginning of the second quarter, Texas was not able to capitalize on a fumble recovery, and Miners running back Aaron Jones would score on a 51-yard touchdown run. However, a 43-yard field goal by Domingue and 8-yard touchdown pass by Buechele to Warrick later in the second quarter placed the Longhorns further ahead at the end of the first half, 20–7.

Texas received the ball to begin the second half, but did not score until the second drive of the half following a 1-yard touchdown run by running back Chris Warren III. A 46-yard touchdown pass by Buechele to receiver Dorian Leonard midway through the third quarter gave Texas a 34–7 lead. The Miners fumbled the ball twice on punt returns in the third quarter, but were able to recover the football each time; however, UTEP was unable to score at any point in the game outside of their sole rushing touchdown in the second quarter. Only one score occurred in the fourth quarter on a 7-yard touchdown pass from Buechele to Heard, and the game ultimately ended with a score of 41–7, with the Longhorns winning. The win marked the 50th win in Charlie Strong's head coaching career, including his tenure at Louisville. Ten players made their first collegiate football appearances during the game, including three true freshmen. With the victory, Texas moved to 2–0 for the year.

=== Week 3 (at California) ===
Texas at California

Team	1	2	3	4	Total
#11 Texas (TEX)	17	16	0	10	43
• California (CAL)	14	21	0	15	50

- Date: September 17, 2016
- Location: Berkeley, California
- Game start: 7:30 p.m. PDT
- Elapsed time: 3:56
- Game attendance: 50,448
- Game weather: Clear; 64 °F (18 °C); wind negligible
- Referee: Mike Defee
- TV announcers (ESPN): Mark Jones, Rod Gilmore, Quint Kessenich

Scoring summary
1	12:53	CAL	Veasy 29 yd pass from Webb (Anderson kick)	CAL 0–7
1	9:38	TEX	Warren III 4 yd run (Domingue kick)	7–7
1	7:16	TEX	Domingue 38 yd field goal	TEX 10–7
1	3:31	TEX	Warren III 12 yd run (Domingue kick)	TEX 17–7
1	0:07	CAL	Enwere 1 yd run (Anderson kick)	TEX 17–14
2	13:31	TEX	Foreman 4 yd run (Domingue kick)	TEX 24–14
2	9:43	CAL	Enwere 1 yd run (Anderson kick)	TEX 24–21
2	7:43	TEX	Warrick 41 yd pass from Buechele (Domingue kick)	TEX 31–21
2	4:55	CAL	Stovall 29 yd pass from Webb (Anderson kick)	TEX 31–28
2	1:38	TEX	Jones 19 yd safety	TEX 33–28
2	0:55	CAL	Hansen 23 yd pass from Webb (Anderson kick)	CAL 33–35
4	13:28	TEX	Foreman 47 yd run (Domingue kick)	TEX 40–35
4	10:45	CAL	Webb 1 yd run (Hansen rush)	CAL 40–43
4	5:29	TEX	Domingue 35 yd field goal	43–43
4	3:41	CAL	Hansen 12 yd pass from Webb (Anderson kick)	CAL 43–50

Prior to the game, bookmakers favored Texas to win by around seven points. Following a string of injuries that occurred during Texas' first game against Notre Dame, all starting players that had sat out during the game against UTEP were expected to play against California.

Texas' first road game of the season began with California receiving the ball, and the Golden Bears' first drive led to a 29-yard touchdown pass from quarterback Davis Webb to receiver Jordan Veasy; Texas would also score on their first possession off of a 4-yard run by Chris Warren III, tying the game early in the first quarter. California's next two drives ended in a turnover on downs and a punt, allowing the Longhorns to pull ahead 17–7 with a Trent Domingue field goal and another rushing touchdown by Warren III; however, the Golden Bears were able to score a rushing touchdown at the end of the first quarter to narrow the score to 17–14. The second quarter featured a combined 37 points between the two teams, with scoring plays that included a 41-yard pass from Buechele to Warrick and a safety for the Longhorns and a 29-yard pass from Webb to receiver Melqui Stovall. The blocked punt by Brandon Jones that resulted in a safety was his second of the season, marking the first time that a Longhorns player blocked multiple punts in the same season since 2012. Texas quarterbacks Swoopes and Buechele were each intercepted once in the second quarter, though Buechele left the game briefly in the quarter due to a possible injury after starting the game. A long 51-yard field goal attempt by Domingue to end the half missed, keeping California in the lead 35 33 to the half.

Neither California nor Texas were able to score in the third quarter, in stark contrast to the first half. While Domingue missed a 49-yard field goal wide right for the Longhorns on their first possession of the half, all other drives for both teams ended in punts in the third quarter. Texas would score first in the fourth quarter on a 47-yard run by Foreman, taking only one play to reach the end zone. The Golden Bears would quickly respond with a 76-yard drive capped off by a 1-yard rushing touchdown by Webb and subsequent Chad Hansen two point conversion. A 10-yard touchdown pass by Buechele to receiver Jake Oliver briefly tied the game 43–43, only for California to reclaim the lead with a 12-yard touchdown pass from Webb to Hansen. Although Texas regained possession of the ball with under four minutes remaining, the Longhorns were unable to make a first down. The Texas defense was unable to hold the California offense to a three-and-out on their last possession, allowing the Golden Bears to end the game with a quarterback kneel and win 50–43. With the loss, Texas moved to 2–1 for the year.

=== Week 4 (Bye week) ===
On September 23, starting offensive guard Kent Perkins was arrested for DWI, and as a result was suspended for the following week's game against Oklahoma State.

=== Week 5 (at Oklahoma State) ===
Texas at Oklahoma State

Team	1	2	3	4	Total
#22 Texas (TEX)	13	12	6	0	31
• Oklahoma State (OSU)	16	21	6	6	49

- Date: October 1, 2016
- Location: Stillwater, Oklahoma
- Game start: 11:00 a.m. CDT
- Elapsed time: 3:35
- Game attendance: 53,468
- Game weather: Clear; 68 °F (20 °C), wind SSE at 4 mph (6.4 km/h)
- Referee: Brad Van Vark
- TV announcers (ABC): Mike Patrick, Ed Cunningham, Jerry Punch

Scoring summary
1	11:29	OSU	Hill 30 yd run (Grogan kick)	OSU 0–7
1	7:23	OSU	Washington 54 yd pass from Rudolph (Grogan kick)	OSU 0–14
1	5:50	TEX	Swoopes 2 yd run (Domingue kick)	OSU 7–14
1	1:25	TEX	Foreman 22 yd run (Domingue kick blocked)	OSU 13–14
1	1:25	OSU	Flowers 98 yd PAT return	OSU 13–16
2	10:13	TEX	Swoopes 12 yd run (Domingue kick blocked)	TEX 19–16
2	8:33	OSU	Rudolph 10 yd run (Grogan kick)	OSU 19–23
2	6:31	TEX	Beck 39 yd pass from Buechele (Domingue kick blocked)	TEX 25–23
2	5:05	OSU	McCleskey 36 yd pass from Rudolph (Grogan kick)	OSU 25–30
2	0:31	OSU	McCleskey 52 yd pass from Rudolph (Grogan kick)	OSU 25–37
3	5:11	OSU	Sanders 1 yd run (Grogan kick blocked)	OSU 25–43
3	4:08	TEX	Foreman 62 yd run (Swoopes rush failed)	OSU 31–43
4	11:54	OSU	Grogan 26 yd field goal	OSU 31–46
4	6:44	OSU	Grogan 24 yd field goal	OSU 31–49

Oklahoma State was favored to win by 2–3 points before the game.

=== Week 6 (vs. Oklahoma) ===
Texas vs. Oklahoma

Team	1	2	3	4	Total
Texas (TEX)	3	10	14	13	40
• #20 Oklahoma (OKLA)	7	7	21	10	45

- Date: October 8, 2016
- Location: Dallas, Texas
- Game start: 11:00 a.m. CDT
- Elapsed time: 3:54
- Game attendance: 92,100
- Game weather: Clear; 65 °F (18 °C); wind negligible
- Referee: Reggie Smith
- TV announcers (FS1): Gus Johnson, Joel Klatt, Shannon Spake

Oklahoma was favored to win by 13–14 points.

=== Week 7 (vs. Iowa State) ===
Texas vs. Iowa State

Team	1	2	3	4	Total
Iowa State (ISU)	6	0	0	0	6
• Texas (TEX)	0	3	21	3	27

- Date: October 15, 2016
- Location: Austin, Texas
- Game start: 6:00 p.m. CDT
- Elapsed time: 3:20
- Game attendance: 96,851
- Game weather: Partly cloudy; 89 °F (32 °C), wind S at 6 mph (9.7 km/h)
- Referee: Scott Campbell
- TV announcers (LHN): Lowell Galindo, Ahmad D. Brooks, Keith Moreland, Dawn Davenport

=== Week 8 (at Kansas State) ===
Texas at Kansas State

Team	1	2	3	4	Total
Texas (TEX)	0	7	7	7	21
• Kansas State (KSU)	7	14	3	0	24

- Date: October 22, 2016
- Location: Manhattan, Kansas
- Game start: 11:00 a.m. CDT
- Elapsed time: 3:19
- Game attendance: 52,328
- Game weather: Clear; 53 °F (12 °C), wind SW at 7 mph (11 km/h)
- Referee: Mike Defee
- TV announcers (ESPN2): Beth Mowins, Anthony Becht, Rocky Boiman

=== Week 9 (vs. Baylor) ===
Texas vs. Baylor

Team	1	2	3	4	Total
#8 Baylor (BAY)	14	7	10	3	34
• Texas (TEX)	14	9	3	9	35

- Date: October 29, 2016
- Location: Austin, Texas
- Game start: 2:30 p.m. CDT
- Elapsed time: 4:08
- Game attendance: 97,822
- Game weather: Mostly clear; 83 °F (28 °C), wind S at 7 mph (11 km/h)
- Referee: Cooper Castleberry
- TV announcers (ABC): Steve Levy, Brian Griese, Todd McShay

=== Week 10 (at Texas Tech) ===
Texas at Texas Tech

Team	1	2	3	4	Total
• Texas (TEX)	14	10	14	7	45
Texas Tech (TTU)	16	7	7	7	37

- Date: November 5, 2016
- Location: Lubbock, Texas
- Game start: 11:00 a.m. CDT
- Elapsed time: 4:15
- Game attendance: 60,803
- Game weather: Foggy; 53 °F (12 °C), wind E at 10 mph (16 km/h)
- Referee: Brad Van Vark
- TV announcers (FS1): Tim Brando, Spencer Tillman, Bruce Feldman

=== Week 11 (vs. West Virginia) ===
Texas vs. West Virginia

Team	1	2	3	4	Total
• #11 West Virginia (WVU)	10	7	7	0	24
Texas (TEX)	3	10	7	0	20

- Date: November 12, 2016
- Location: Austin, Texas
- Game start: 11:00 a.m. CST
- Elapsed time: 3:45
- Game attendance: 98,367
- Game weather: Clear; 70 °F (21 °C), wind N at 10 mph (16 km/h)
- Referee: Dan Romeo
- TV announcers (FS1): Joe Davis, Brady Quinn, Bruce Feldman

=== Week 12 (at Kansas) ===
Texas at Kansas

Team	1	2	3	4	OT	Total
Texas (TEX)	7	0	7	7	0	21
• Kansas (KU)	0	10	0	11	3	24

- Date: November 19, 2016
- Location: Lawrence, Kansas
- Game start: 2:30 p.m. CST
- Elapsed time: 3:53
- Game attendance: 25,673
- Game weather: Clear; 47 °F (8 °C), wind NW at 8 mph (13 km/h)
- Referee: Scott Campbell
- TV announcers (ABC): Allen Bestwick, Mike Bellotti, Kris Budden

The overtime loss to Kansas was the Longhorns' first loss to the Jayhawks since 1938.

=== Week 13 (vs. TCU) ===
Texas vs. TCU

Team	1	2	3	4	Total
• TCU	7	0	10	14	31
Texas (TEX)	3	3	3	0	9

- Date: November 25, 2016
- Location: Austin, Texas
- Game start: 2:30 p.m. CST
- Elapsed time: 3:26
- Game attendance: 99,065
- Game weather: Overcast; 64 °F (18 °C), wind N at 8 mph (13 km/h)
- Referee: Mike Defee
- TV announcers (FS1): Tim Brando, Spencer Tillman, Bruce Feldman
