= 2016 Big 12 Conference football season =

American college football season

- League: NCAA Division I Football Bowl Subdivision
- Sport: Football
- Duration: September 2, 2016 through January 2, 2017
- Teams: 10
- TV partner(s): ABC, FOX, ESPN, FS1, FSN, LHN

2017 NFL Draft
- Top draft pick: Patrick Mahomes II (Texas Tech)
- Picked by: Kansas City Chiefs, 10th overall

Regular season
- Season champions: Oklahoma
- Runners-up: Oklahoma State
- Top scorer: Ben Grogan (117 points)

Football seasons
- 2015 2017

2016 Big 12 Conference football standings
	Conf.			Overall
Team	W		L	W		L
No. 5 Oklahoma $	9	–	0	11	–	2
No. 11 Oklahoma State	7	–	2	10	–	3
No. 18 West Virginia	7	–	2	10	–	3
Kansas State	6	–	3	9	–	4
TCU	4	–	5	6	–	7
Baylor	3	–	6	7	–	6
Texas	3	–	6	5	–	7
Texas Tech	3	–	6	5	–	7
Iowa State	2	–	7	3	–	9
Kansas	1	–	8	2	–	10
$ – Conference champion; Rankings from AP Poll

The 2016 Big 12 Conference football season was the 21st season of Big 12 Conference football, taking place during the 2016 NCAA Division I FBS football season. The season began with non-conference play on September 2, 2016, with Kansas State playing Stanford. Big 12 Conference play began on September 17, 2016, with Iowa State playing TCU.

The 2016 season was the fifth for the Big 12 since the 2010–13 Big 12 Conference realignment brought the Big 12 membership to its current form. The conference has ten members: Baylor, Iowa State, Kansas, Kansas State, Oklahoma, Oklahoma State, TCU, Texas, Texas Tech and West Virginia. The Big 12 was a Power Five conference under the College Football Playoff format, along with the ACC, the Big Ten, the Pac-12 and the SEC. As a 10-team league, the Big 12 will play a 9-game, round-robin conference schedule and each member will play 3 non-conference games–one of which must be against another Power Five conference foe. The conference championship will be awarded to the team with the highest conference winning percentage at the conclusion of league play. In the event of a tie atop the standings, the conference tiebreaker shall determine the champion.

The Big 12 Champion earned a berth to the 2017 Sugar Bowl, playing the SEC Champion at the Mercedes-Benz Superdome in New Orleans, on January 2, 2017. If the Big 12 Champion or SEC Champion are selected for the College Football Playoff, then a replacement team from the league will be designated to represent its conference in the Sugar Bowl according to the league's rules.

== Preseason ==
=== Recruiting ===
National rankings
Team	ESPN	Rivals	Scout	24/7	Total signees
Baylor	#17*	#55	#47	#36	15
Iowa State	#54	#53	#45	#52	29
Kansas	NR	#100	#94	#81	19
Kansas State	#70	#76	#73	#71	21
Oklahoma	#21	#16	#19	#22	22
Oklahoma State	#46	#48	#42	#43	21
TCU	#23	#20	#13	#18	24
Texas	#10	#7	#3	#9	28
Texas Tech	#42	#46	#31	#47	25
West Virginia	#37	#38	#36	#41	28

- ESPN has not updated its class rankings since National Signing Day. In May–July, 2016, Baylor lost a significant number of signees as a result of the school's sexual assault scandal, which led to the firing of many university employees, including head coach Art Briles. Several of Baylor's top-ranked signees re-signed with other Big 12 schools, including Texas, TCU, Oklahoma and Oklahoma State.

=== Preseason poll ===
	Team ranking	First-place votes	Raw points
1.	Oklahoma	(24)	258
2.	TCU	(2)	222
3.	Oklahoma State	(0)	202
4.	Baylor	(0)	156
5.	Texas	(0)	151
6.	Texas Tech	(0)	141
7.	West Virginia	(0)	126
8.	Kansas State	(0)	88
9.	Iowa State	(0)	59
10.	Kansas	(0)	27

=== Preseason awards ===
2016 Preseason All-Big 12

- Offensive Player of the Year: Baker Mayfield, Oklahoma, QB
- Defensive Player of the Year: Malik Jefferson, Texas, LB
- Newcomer of the Year: Kenny Hill, TCU, QB

All-Big 12 Offense
Position	Player	Class	Team
QB	Baker Mayfield	Junior	Oklahoma
RB	Mike Warren	Sophomore	Iowa State
RB	Samaje Perine	Junior	Oklahoma
FB	Winston Dimel	Sophomore	Kansas State
WR	K. D. Cannon	Junior	Baylor
WR	Allen Lazard	Junior	Iowa State
WR	James Washington	Junior	Oklahoma State
TE	Mark Andrews	Sophomore	Oklahoma
OL	Spencer Drango	Senior	Baylor
OL	Kyle Fuller	Senior	Baylor
OL	Orlando Brown	Sophomore	Oklahoma
OL	Patrick Vahe	Sophomore	Texas
OL	Connor Williams	Sophomore	Texas
OL	Tyler Orlosky	Senior	West Virginia
PK	Clayton Hatfield	Sophomore	Texas Tech
KR/PR	KaVontae Turpin	Sophomore	TCU

All-Big 12 Defense
Position	Player	Class	Team
DL	Will Geary	Junior	Kansas State
DL	Jordan Willis	Senior	Kansas State
DL	Charles Walker	Junior	Oklahoma
DL	Vincent Taylor	Junior	Oklahoma State
DL	Josh Carraway	Senior	TCU
DL	James McFarland	Senior	TCU
DL	Noble Nwachukwu	Senior	West Virginia
LB	Elijah Lee	Junior	Kansas State
LB	Jordan Evans	Senior	Oklahoma
LB	Malik Jefferson	Sophomore	Texas
DB	Dante Barnett	Senior	Kansas State
DB	Steven Parker	Junior	Oklahoma
DB	Jordan Thomas	Junior	Oklahoma
DB	Jordan Sterns	Senior	Oklahoma State
DB	Davante Davis	Sophomore	Texas
P	Austin Seibert	Sophomore	Oklahoma

== Regular season ==
=== Week 1 ===
Schedule and results:

Date	Time (CT)	Visiting team	Home team	Site	TV	Result	Attendance
September 2	6:30 p.m.	Northwestern State	#23 Baylor	McLane Stadium • Waco, Texas	FSN	W 55−7	44,849
September 2	8:00 p.m.	Kansas State	#8 Stanford	Stanford Stadium • Stanford, California	FS1	L 13−26	46,147
September 3	11:00 a.m.	Missouri	West Virginia	Mountaineer Field • Morgantown, West Virginia	FS1	W 26−11	60,125
September 3	11:00 a.m.	#3 Oklahoma	#14 Houston	NRG Stadium • Houston	ABC	L 23–33	71,016
September 3	2:30 p.m.	Southeastern Louisiana	#23 Oklahoma State	Boone Pickens Stadium • Stillwater, Oklahoma	FSN	W 61−7	50,079
September 3	6:00 p.m.	Rhode Island	Kansas	Memorial Stadium • Lawrence, Kansas	ESPN3	W 55−6	28,864
September 3	7:00 p.m.	#14 (FCS) South Dakota State	#13 TCU	Amon G. Carter Stadium • Fort Worth, Texas	FSN	W 59−41	43,450
September 3	7:00 p.m.	Stephen F. Austin	Texas Tech	Jones AT&T Stadium • Lubbock, Texas	FSN	W 69−17	60,097
September 3	7:00 p.m.	#5 (FCS) Northern Iowa	Iowa State	Jack Trice Stadium • Ames, Iowa	Cyclones.TV	L 20−25	60,629
September 4	6:30 p.m.	#10 Notre Dame	Texas	Darrell K Royal–Texas Memorial Stadium • Austin, Texas	ABC	W 50–47^{2OT}	102,315

Players of the week:

Offensive		Defensive		Special Teams		Newcomer	
Player	Team	Player	Team	Player	Team	Player	Team
Kenny Hill (QB); Tyrone Swoopes (QB)	TCU; Texas	Chris Nelson (DT)	Texas	KaVontae Turpin (WR/PR)	TCU	Shane Buechele (QB)	Texas
Reference: Big 12 Conference

=== Week 2 ===
Schedule and results:

Date	Time (CT)	Visiting team	Home team	Site	TV	Result	Attendance
September 10	11:00 a.m.	Central Michigan	#22 Oklahoma State	Boone Pickens Stadium • Stillwater, Oklahoma	FS1	L 27−30	52,523
September 10	1:00 p.m.	#22 (FCS) Youngstown State	West Virginia	Mountaineer Field • Morgantown, West Virginia	RTPT	W 38−21	56,261
September 10	1:30 p.m.	Ohio	Kansas	Memorial Stadium • Lawrence, Kansas	FSN	L 21−37	28,467
September 10	2:30 p.m.	SMU	#23 Baylor	McLane Stadium • Waco, Texas	FS1	W 40−13	45,499
September 10	6:00 p.m.	Arkansas	#15 TCU	Amon G. Carter Stadium • Fort Worth, Texas	ESPN	L 38−41^{2OT}	48,091
September 10	6:00 p.m.	UTEP	#11 Texas	Darrell K Royal–Texas Memorial Stadium • Austin, Texas	LHN	W 41−7	92,863
September 10	6:00 p.m.	Louisiana–Monroe	#14 Oklahoma	Gaylord Family Oklahoma Memorial Stadium • Norman, Oklahoma	FSN	W 59−17	87,037
September 10	6:30 p.m.	Iowa State	#16 Iowa	Kinnick Stadium • Iowa City, Iowa	BTN	L 3−42	70,585
September 10	9:00 p.m.	Texas Tech	Arizona State	Sun Devil Stadium • Tempe, Arizona	FS1	L 55−68	44,511

Players of the week:

Offensive		Defensive		Special teams		Newcomer	
Player	Team	Player	Team	Player	Team	Player	Team
Patrick Mahomes (QB)	Texas Tech	Orion Stewart (S)	Baylor	KaVontae Turpin (WR/KR) (2)	TCU	Shane Buechele (QB) (2)	Texas
Reference: Big 12 Conference

=== Week 3 ===
Schedule and results:

Date	Time (CT)	Visiting team	Home team	Site	TV	Result	Attendance
September 16	7:00 p.m.	#21 Baylor	Rice	Rice Stadium • Houston, Texas	ESPN	W 38–10	27,047
September 17	11:00 a.m.	Kansas	Memphis	Liberty Bowl Memorial Stadium • Memphis, Tennessee	ESPNU	L 7–43	34,448
September 17	11:00 a.m.	Iowa State	TCU	Amon G. Carter Stadium • Fort Worth, Texas	FS1	TCU 41–20	45,119
September 17	1:30 p.m.	Florida Atlantic	Kansas State	Bill Snyder Family Football Stadium • Manhattan, Kansas	FSN	W 63−7	50,871
September 17	2:30 p.m.	Pittsburgh	Oklahoma State	Boone Pickens Stadium • Stillwater, Oklahoma	ESPN	W 45–38	53,514
September 17	6:00 p.m.	Louisiana Tech	Texas Tech	Jones AT&T Stadium • Lubbock, Texas	FSN	W 59–45	57,515
September 17	6:30 p.m.	#3 Ohio State	#14 Oklahoma	Gaylord Family Oklahoma Memorial Stadium • Norman, Oklahoma	FOX	L 24–45	87,979
September 17	9:30 p.m.	#11 Texas	California	California Memorial Stadium • Berkeley, California	ESPN	L 43–50	50,448

Players of the week:

Offensive		Defensive		Special Teams		Newcomer	
Player	Team	Player	Team	Player	Team	Player	Team
James Washington (WR)	Oklahoma State	Ty Summers (LB)	TCU	Dominique Heath (WR/PR); Zach Sinor (P)	Kansas State; Oklahoma State	JaMycal Hasty (RB)	Baylor
Reference: Big 12 Conference

=== Week 4 ===
Schedule and results:

Date	Time (CT)	Visiting team	Home team	Site	TV	Result	Attendance
September 23	7:00 p.m.	TCU	SMU	Gerald J. Ford Stadium • University Park, Texas	ESPN	W 33–3	30,987
September 24	11:00 a.m.	San Jose State	Iowa State	Jack Trice Stadium • Ames, Iowa	FSN	W 44–10	50,851
September 24	2:30 p.m.	BYU	West Virginia	FedExField • Landover, Maryland	ESPN2	W 35–32	38,207
September 24	6:00 p.m.	Missouri State	Kansas State	Bill Snyder Family Football Stadium • Manhattan, Kansas	K-StateHD.tv	W 35–0	51,686
September 24	6:30 p.m.	Oklahoma State	#16 Baylor	McLane Stadium • Waco, Texas	FOX	BU 35–24	45,373

Players of the week:

Offensive		Defensive		Special teams		Newcomer	
Player	Team	Player	Team	Player	Team	Player	Team
Seth Russell (QB)	Baylor	Travon Blanchard (NB)	Baylor	Byron Pringle (WR/PR); Desmon White (WR/PR)	Kansas State; TCU	Justice Hill (RB)	Oklahoma State
Reference: Big 12 Conference

=== Week 5 ===
Schedule and results:

Date	Time (CT)	Visiting team	Home team	Site	TV	Result	Attendance
September 29	7:30 p.m.	Kansas	Texas Tech	Jones AT&T Stadium • Lubbock, Texas	FS1	TTU 55–19	56,494
October 1	11:00 a.m.	#22 Texas	Oklahoma State	Boone Pickens Stadium • Stillwater, Oklahoma	ABC	OSU 49–31	53,468
October 1	11:00 a.m.	#13 Baylor	Iowa State	Jack Trice Stadium • Ames, Iowa	FS1	BU 45–42	50,842
October 1	2:30 p.m.	Kansas State	West Virginia	Mountaineer Field • Morgantown, West Virginia	ESPNU	WVU 17–16	61,701
October 1	4:00 p.m.	Oklahoma	#21 TCU	Amon G. Carter Stadium • Fort Worth, Texas	FOX	OU 52–46	47,851

Players of the week:

Offensive		Defensive		Special teams		Newcomer	
Player	Team	Player	Team	Player	Team	Player	Team
Shock Linwood (RB)	Baylor	Elijah Lee (LB)	Kansas State	Austin Seibert (K/P)	Oklahoma	Justice Hill (RB) (2)	Oklahoma State
Reference: Big 12 Conference

=== Week 6 ===
Schedule and results:

Date	Time (CT)	Visiting team	Home team	Site	TV	Result	Attendance
October 8	11:00 a.m.	Texas	#20 Oklahoma	Cotton Bowl • Dallas, Texas	FS1	OU 45–40	92,100
October 8	11:00 a.m.	TCU	Kansas	Memorial Stadium • Lawrence, Kansas	ESPNU	TCU 24–23	23,946
October 8	2:30 p.m.	Iowa State	Oklahoma State	Boone Pickens Stadium • Stillwater, Oklahoma	ESPNU	OSU 38–31	53,239
October 8	6:00 p.m.	Texas Tech	Kansas State	Bill Snyder Family Football Stadium • Manhattan, Kansas	ESPNU	KSU 44–38	51,540

Players of the week:

Offensive		Defensive		Special teams		Newcomer	
Player	Team	Player	Team	Player	Team	Player	Team
Dede Westbrook (WR)	Oklahoma	Josh Carraway (DE)	TCU	Byron Pringle (KR/WR) (2)	Kansas State	D. J. Reed (DB)	Kansas State
Reference: Big 12 Conference

=== Week 7 ===
Schedule and results:

Date	Time (CT)	Visiting team	Home team	Site	TV	Result	Attendance
October 15	11:00 a.m.	Kansas State	#19 Oklahoma	Gaylord Family Oklahoma Memorial Stadium • Norman, Oklahoma	ESPN	OU 38–17	86,049
October 15	11:00 a.m.	#20 West Virginia	Texas Tech	Jones AT&T Stadium • Lubbock, Texas	FS1	WVU 48–17	54,111
October 15	2:30 p.m.	Kansas	#11 Baylor	McLane Stadium • Waco, Texas	FS1	BU 49–7	47,598
October 15	6:00 p.m.	Iowa State	Texas	Darrell K Royal–Texas Memorial Stadium • Austin, Texas	LHN/CyTV	TEX 27–6	96,851

Players of the week:

Offensive		Defensive		Special teams		Newcomer	
Player	Team	Player	Team	Player	Team	Player	Team
Skyler Howard (QB)	West Virginia	Ryan Reid (CB)	Baylor	Cole Moos (P)	Kansas	Devin Duvernay (WR)	Texas
Reference: Big 12 Conference

=== Week 8 ===
Schedule and results:

Date	Time (CT)	Visiting team	Home team	Site	TV	Result	Attendance
October 22	11:00 a.m.	Oklahoma State	Kansas	Memorial Stadium • Lawrence, Kansas	FS1	OSU 44–20	26,262
October 22	11:00 a.m.	Texas	Kansas State	Bill Snyder Family Football Stadium • Manhattan, Kansas	ESPN2	KSU 24–21	52,328
October 22	2:30 p.m.	TCU	#12 West Virginia	Mountaineer Field • Morgantown, West Virginia	ESPN2	WVU 34–10	61,780
October 22	7:00 p.m.	#16 Oklahoma	Texas Tech	Jones AT&T Stadium • Lubbock, Texas	FOX	OU 66–59	60,478

Players of the week:

Offensive		Defensive		Special teams		Newcomer	
Player	Team	Player	Team	Player	Team	Player	Team
Patrick Mahomes (QB); Joe Mixon (RB)	Texas Tech; Oklahoma	Jordan Willis (DE)	Kansas State	Ben Grogan (K)	Oklahoma State	Justice Hill (RB) (3)	Oklahoma State
Reference: Big 12 Conference

=== Week 9 ===
Schedule and results:

Date	Time (CT)	Visiting team	Home team	Site	TV	Result	Attendance
October 29	11:00 a.m.	#10 West Virginia	Oklahoma State	Boone Pickens Stadium • Stillwater, Oklahoma	FOX	OSU 37–20	59,584
October 29	11:00 a.m.	Kansas State	Iowa State	Jack Trice Stadium • Ames, Iowa	FSN	KSU 31–26	52,763
October 29	2:30 p.m.	Texas Tech	TCU	Amon G. Carter Stadium • Fort Worth, Texas	ESPN2	TTU 27–24^{OT}	45,619
October 29	2:30 p.m.	#8 Baylor	Texas	Darrell K Royal–Texas Memorial Stadium • Austin, Texas	ABC	TEX 35–34	97,822
October 29	6:00 p.m.	Kansas	#16Oklahoma	Gaylord Family Oklahoma Memorial Stadium • Norman, Oklahoma	FS1	OU 56–3	86,301

Players of the week:

Offensive		Defensive		Special teams		Newcomer	
Player	Team	Player	Team	Player	Team	Player	Team
D'Onta Foreman (RB)	Texas	Vincent Taylor (DT)	Oklahoma State	Zach Sinor (P) (2)	Oklahoma State	Shane Buechele (QB) (3)	Texas
Reference: Big 12 Conference

=== Week 10 ===
Schedule and results:

Date	Time (CT)	Visiting team	Home team	Site	TV	Result	Attendance
November 3	6:30 p.m.	#14 Oklahoma	Iowa State	Jack Trice Stadium • Ames, Iowa	ESPN	OU 34–24	50,662
November 5	11:00 a.m.	Texas	Texas Tech	Jones AT&T Stadium • Lubbock, Texas	FS1	TEX 45–37	60,803
November 5	2:30 p.m.	#18 Oklahoma State	Kansas State	Bill Snyder Family Football Stadium • Manhattan, Kansas	ABC	OSU 43–37	52,450
November 5	2:30 p.m.	TCU	#17 Baylor	McLane Stadium • Waco, Texas	FOX	TCU 62–22	48,129
November 5	6:00 p.m.	Kansas	#20 West Virginia	Mountaineer Field • Morgantown, West Virginia	ESPN2	WVU 48–21	56,343

Players of the week:

Offensive		Defensive		Special teams		Newcomer	
Player	Team	Player	Team	Player	Team	Player	Team
D'Onta Foreman (RB) (2)	Texas	Travin Howard (LB)	TCU	Michael Dickson (P)	Texas	Justin Crawford (RB)	West Virginia
Reference: Big 12 Conference

=== Week 11 ===
Schedule and results:

Date	Time (CT)	Visiting team	Home team	Site	TV	Result	Attendance
November 12	11:00 a.m.	Baylor	#11 Oklahoma	Gaylord Family Oklahoma Memorial Stadium • Norman, Oklahoma	ABC	OU 45–24	86,249
November 12	11:00 a.m.	Iowa State	Kansas	Memorial Stadium • Lawrence, Kansas	FSN	ISU 31–24	23,757
November 12	11:00 a.m.	#16 West Virginia	Texas	Darrell K Royal–Texas Memorial Stadium • Austin, Texas	FS1	WVU 24–20	96,367
November 12	2:30 p.m.	Texas Tech	#13 Oklahoma State	Boone Pickens Stadium • Stillwater, Oklahoma	FS1	OSU 45–44	54,288

Players of the week:

Offensive		Defensive		Special teams		Newcomer	
Player	Team	Player	Team	Player	Team	Player	Team
Mason Rudolph (QB)	Oklahoma State	Jordan Evans (LB)	Oklahoma	Michael Barden (K/P)	Texas Tech	David Montgomery (RB)	Iowa State
Reference: Big 12 Conference

=== Week 12 ===
Schedule and results:

Date	Time (CT)	Visiting team	Home team	Site	TV	Result	Attendance
November 19	11:00 a.m.	Kansas State	Baylor	McLane Stadium • Waco, Texas	ESPN2	KSU 42–21	43,581
November 19	11:00 a.m.	#11 Oklahoma State	TCU	Amon G. Carter Stadium • Fort Worth, Texas	FS1	OSU 31–6	43,303
November 19	2:30 p.m.	Texas Tech	Iowa State	Jack Trice Stadium • Ames, Iowa	FS1	ISU 66–10	50,787
November 19	2:30 p.m.	Texas	Kansas	Memorial Stadium • Lawrence, Kansas	ABC	KU 24–21^{OT}	25,673
November 19	7:00 p.m.	#9 Oklahoma	#14 West Virginia	Mountaineer Field • Morgantown, West Virginia	ABC	OU 56–28	57,645

Players of the week:

Offensive		Defensive		Special teams		Newcomer	
Player	Team	Player	Team	Player	Team	Player	Team
Justin Crawford (RB)	West Virginia	Kamari Cotton-Moya (S); Dorance Armstrong Jr. (DE)	Iowa State; Kansas	Matthew Wyman (K)	Kansas	Justin Crawford (RB) (2)	West Virginia
Reference: Big 12 Conference

=== Week 13 ===
Schedule and results:

Date	Time (CT)	Visiting team	Home team	Site	TV	Result	Attendance
November 25	2:30 p.m.	TCU	Texas	Darrell K Royal–Texas Memorial Stadium • Austin, Texas	FS1	TCU 31–9	99,065
November 25	5:00 p.m.	Baylor	Texas Tech	AT&T Stadium • Arlington, Texas	ESPN	TTU 54–35	41,656
November 26	11:00 a.m.	Kansas	Kansas State	Bill Snyder Family Football Stadium • Manhattan, Kansas	FS1	KSU 34–19	52,637
November 26	2:30 p.m.	#18 West Virginia	Iowa State	Jack Trice Stadium • Ames, Iowa	FS1	WVU 49–19	51,365

Players of the week:

Offensive		Defensive		Special teams		Newcomer	
Player	Team	Player	Team	Player	Team	Player	Team
Patrick Mahomes (QB) (3)	Texas Tech	Ty Summers (LB) (2)	TCU	Cole Netten (K)	Iowa State	Martell Pettaway (RB)	West Virginia
Reference: Big 12 Conference

=== Week 14 ===
Schedule and results:

Date	Time (CT)	Visiting team	Home team	Site	TV	Result	Attendance
December 3	11:00 a.m.	Kansas State	TCU	Among G. Carter Stadium • Fort Worth, Texas	FS1	KSU 30–6	42,746
December 3	11:30 a.m.	#10 Oklahoma State	#9 Oklahoma	Gaylord Family Oklahoma Memorial Stadium • Norman, Oklahoma	FOX	OU 38–20	87,527
December 3	2:30 p.m.	Baylor	#16 West Virginia	Mountaineer Field • Morgantown, West Virginia	FS1	WVU 24–21	49,229

Players of the week:

Offensive		Defensive		Special teams		Newcomer	
Player	Team	Player	Team	Player	Team	Player	Team
Samaje Perine (RB)	Oklahoma	Martin Gross Jr. (S)	West Virginia	Barry J. Sanders (KR)	Oklahoma State	Justin Crawford (RB) (3)	West Virginia
Reference: Big 12 Conference

== Rankings ==
Legend
	Increase in ranking
	Decrease in ranking
RV	Received votes but were not ranked in Top 25 of poll
NR	Not ranked and did not receive any votes in poll

		Pre	Wk 1	Wk 2	Wk 3	Wk 4	Wk 5	Wk 6	Wk 7	Wk 8	Wk 9	Wk 10	Wk 11	Wk 12	Wk 13	Wk 14	Final
Baylor	AP	23	23	21	16	13	13	11	9	8	13	25	NR	NR	NR	NR	NR
Baylor	C	21	19	19	15	13	11	8	8	6	13	25	RV	NR	NR	NR	NR
Baylor	CFP	Not released									17	NR	NR	NR	NR	NR	
Iowa State	AP	NR	NR	NR	NR	NR	NR	NR	NR	NR	NR	NR	NR	NR	NR	NR	NR
Iowa State	C	NR	NR	NR	NR	NR	NR	NR	NR	NR	NR	NR	NR	NR	NR	NR	NR
Iowa State	CFP	Not released									NR	NR	NR	NR	NR	NR	
Kansas	AP	NR	NR	NR	NR	NR	NR	NR	NR	NR	NR	NR	NR	NR	NR	NR	NR
Kansas	C	NR	NR	NR	NR	NR	NR	NR	NR	NR	NR	NR	NR	NR	NR	NR	NR
Kansas	CFP	Not released									NR	NR	NR	NR	NR	NR	
Kansas State	AP	NR	NR	NR	NR	NR	NR	NR	NR	NR	NR	NR	NR	NR	NR	RV	RV
Kansas State	C	NR	NR	NR	RV	RV	NR	NR	NR	NR	NR	NR	NR	NR	NR	NR	RV
Kansas State	CFP	Not released									NR	NR	NR	NR	NR	NR	
Oklahoma	AP	3	14	14	25	RV	20	19	16	16	12	9	8	7	7	7	5
Oklahoma	C	3	13	14	RV	RV	22	20	16	15	11	9	8	7	7	7	3
Oklahoma	CFP	Not released									14	11	9	8	9	7	
Oklahoma State	AP	21	22	RV	RV	NR	RV	RV	RV	RV	22	17	13	10	11	13	11
Oklahoma State	C	19	17	RV	RV	NR	RV	RV	RV	RV	22	17	13	10	10	13	11
Oklahoma State	CFP	Not released									18	13	11	10	10	12	
TCU	AP	13	15	RV	RV	21	RV	RV	RV	NR	NR	NR	NR	NR	NR	NR	NR
TCU	C	14	12	RV	21	19	RV	RV	RV	NR	NR	NR	NR	NR	NR	NR	NR
TCU	CFP	Not released									NR	NR	NR	NR	NR	NR	
Texas	AP	RV	11	11	21	22	RV	NR	NR	NR	NR	NR	NR	NR	NR	NR	NR
Texas	C	RV	20	16	24	25	NR	NR	NR	NR	NR	NR	NR	NR	NR	NR	NR
Texas	CFP	Not released									NR	NR	NR	NR	NR	NR	
Texas Tech	AP	NR	NR	NR	NR	NR	NR	NR	NR	NR	NR	NR	NR	NR	NR	NR	NR
Texas Tech	C	NR	NR	NR	NR	NR	RV	NR	NR	NR	NR	NR	NR	NR	NR	NR	NR
Texas Tech	CFP	Not released									NR	NR	NR	NR	NR	NR	
West Virginia	AP	NR	RV	NR	NR	RV	22	20	12	10	14	11	10	19	14	14	18
West Virginia	C	NR	RV	RV	RV	RV	20	18	13	9	15	10	9	17	13	12	17
West Virginia	CFP	Not released									20	16	14	18	16	16	

== Home game attendance ==
Team	Stadium	Capacity	Game 1	Game 2	Game 3	Game 4	Game 5	Game 6	Game 7	Total	Average	% of Capacity
Baylor	McLane Stadium	45,140	44,849	**45,499**	**45,373**	**47,598**	**48,129**†	43,581	—	275,029	45,838	101.54%
Iowa State	Jack Trice Stadium	61,500	60,629†	50,851	50,842	52,763	50,662	50,787	51,365	367,899	52,557	95.91%
Kansas	Memorial Stadium	50,071	28,864†	28,467	23,946	26,262	23,757	25,673	—	156,969	26,161	52.25%
Kansas State	Bill Snyder Family Stadium	50,000	**50,871**	**51,686**	**51,540**	**52,328**	**52,450**	**52,637**†	—	311,512	51,919	103.84%
Oklahoma	Gaylord Family Oklahoma Memorial Stadium	82,112	**87,037**	**87,979**†	**86,049**	**86,301**	**86,249**	**87,527**	—	521,142	86,857	105.78%
Oklahoma State	Boone Pickens Stadium	60,218	50,079	52,523	53,514	53,468	53,239	59,584†	54,288	376,695	53,813	89.36%
TCU	Amon G. Carter Stadium	45,000	43,450	**48,091**†	45,000	45,000	**45,619**	43,303	42,746	313,209	44,744	99.43%
Texas	Darrell K Royal–Texas Memorial Stadium	100,119	**102,315**†	92,683	96,851	97,822	96,367	99,065	—	585,103	97,517	97.40%
Texas Tech	Jones AT&T Stadium	60,454	60,097	57,515	56,494	54,111	**60,478**	**60,803**†	—	349,498	58,249	96.35%
West Virginia	Mountaineer Field	60,000	**60,125**	56,261	**61,701**	**61,780**†	56,343	57,645	49,229	403,084	57,583	95.97%

Bold – Exceed capacity
†Season High

== Postseason ==
=== Bowl games ===
Legend
Big 12 win
Big 12 loss

Bowl game	Date	Site	Television	Time (CST)	Big 12 team	Opponent	Score	Attendance
**New Year's Six Bowl**
Sugar Bowl	January 2	Mercedes-Benz Superdome • New Orleans, LA	ESPN	7:30 p.m.	**No. 7 Oklahoma**	No. 14 Auburn	**W** 35–19	54,077

Rankings are from CFP rankings. All times Central Time Zone. Big 12 teams shown in bold.
