= Jerrod Heard =

American football player (born 1995)

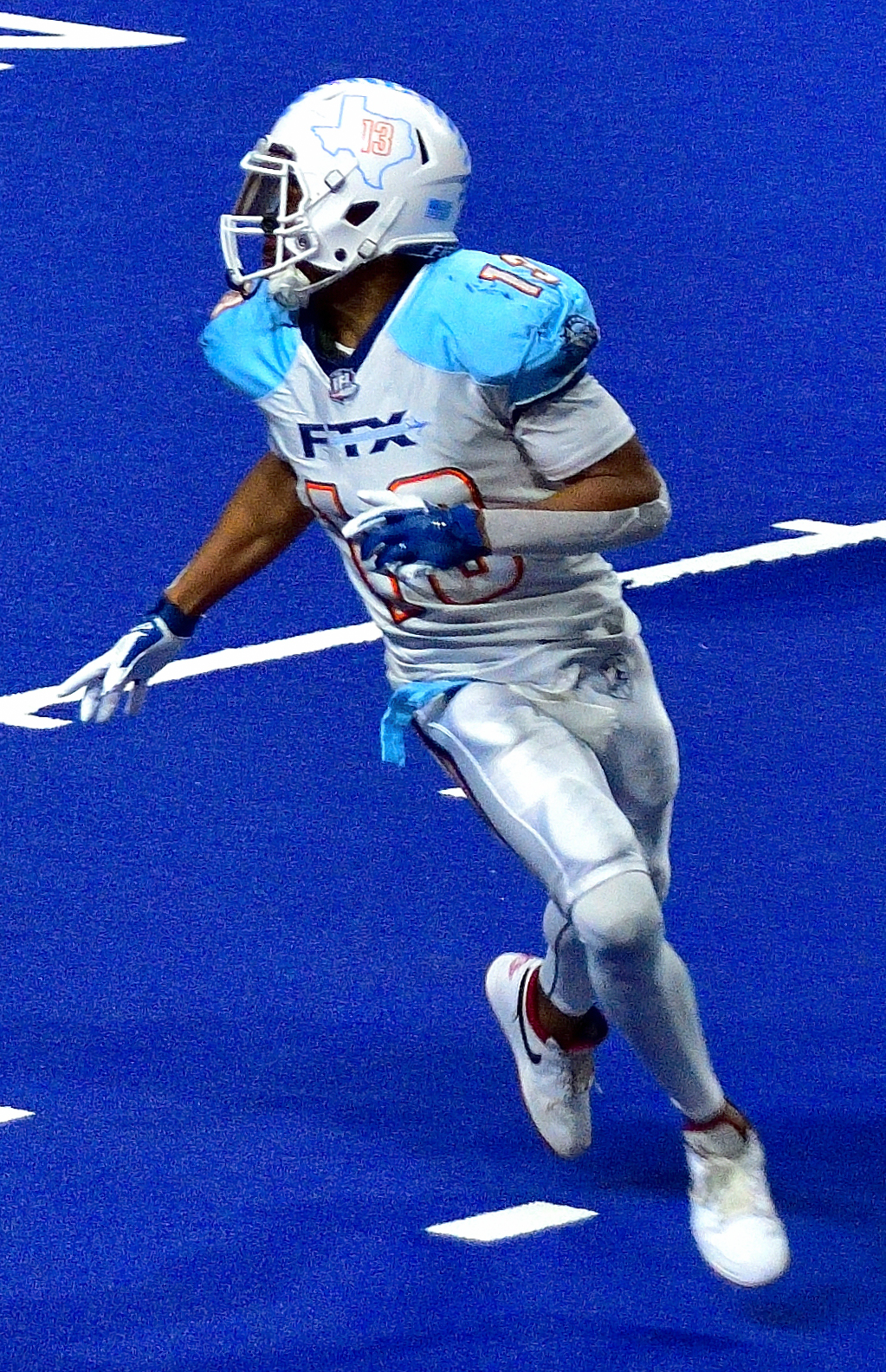
- Heard with the Frisco Fighters in 2021

No. 16
- Positions: Wide receiver, quarterback

Personal information
- Born: September 10, 1995 (age 31); Denton, Texas, U.S.
- Listed height: 6 ft 1 in (1.85 m)
- Listed weight: 201 lb (91 kg)

Career information
- High school: John H. Guyer (Denton, Texas)
- College: Texas (2014–2018)
- NFL draft: 2019: undrafted

Career history
- Dallas Renegades (2020); Team 9 (2020)*; Frisco Fighters (2021–2022)
- * Offseason or practice squad member only

Jerrod Alexander Heard (born September 10, 1995) is an American former professional football wide receiver and quarterback. He played college football for the Texas Longhorns from 2014 to 2018. He previously played with the Dallas Renegades and Team 9 of the XFL. He also played for the Frisco Fighters of the Indoor Football League (IFL).

== Early life ==
Heard attended and played quarterback for John H. Guyer High School in Denton, Texas, a 4A D1 high school at the time, now a 6A D1 high school, and won State Championships in Football in 2012 and 2013. He was rated by Rivals.com as a four-star recruit and was ranked among the top dual-threat quarterbacks in his class. He committed to the University of Texas to play college football.

== College career ==
Heard was redshirted for the 2014 season and did not enter any games.

In the summer of 2015, as a redshirt freshman, he competed with Tyrone Swoopes to be the Longhorns starting quarterback. Swoopes would win the competition and start the first game, but after a lopsided loss to Notre Dame to start the season, Heard took over at QB. Swoopes and Heard would alternate at QB all year for Texas, although Heard would start 10 games in the 2015 season. In his first start for Texas against Rice, Heard threw for 120 yards with two touchdowns and rushed for 96 yards.

In only his second start at QB, Heard broke Vince Young's single game record for offense for the Texas Longhorns, accounting for 527 yards of total offense. Texas lost a heartbreaker 45–44 to California by missing an extra point after Heard rushed for a 45-yard touchdown with 1:11 remaining in the 4th quarter, his third rushing TD of the game.

Against #22 Oklahoma State, Heard went 9/17 for 119 yards and rushed for another 48 yards in a loss. Texas was heavily penalized all day, with the referees calling back two touchdowns and two turnovers on penalties. Despite the setbacks, Texas was in position to win but had another kicking error in the last minute to set up Oklahoma State to win in regulation. Heard had no touchdowns but was instrumental in keeping Texas within striking distance the entire game

Heard played an outstanding game against #10 Oklahoma in the Cotton Bowl in his 4th start, giving both him and coach Charlie Strong their first signature win. Heard was one of 2 players on the Longhorns who rushed for over 100 yards in the game and helped to dominate the rushing attack against a top 10 team, winning 24–17. Heard only attempted 11 passes all game (with 1 touchdown), while Texas rushed on 58 plays. Backup quarterback Tyrone Swoopes began to come in and out of games as part of the 18-wheeler package, and was used in short yardage and goal line situations. Swoopes was credited with 2 touchdowns against OU.

On a rainy day in Austin against Kansas State, Heard was given a game plan of a heavy running attack. Heard and the Longhorns offense ran over and over for an average of 5.2 yards per rush, and only attempted 1 dropback pass in the entire first half for a 16–6 lead. Swoopes came into the game with the goal line package and in the 4th quarter and ran for 3 touchdowns. Heard scrambled for 4 first downs on 3rd-and-long in the game and was able to consistently move the chains all day as Texas won 23–9.

Heard and the Texas Longhorns beat Kansas at home with another outstanding game passing and running. Heard totaled 201 yards passing and another 53 yards rushing with 1 passing TD. Swoopes was put into the game in goal line situations and scored 4 rushing touchdowns in the game.

After losing to West Virginia, Heard started the annual thanksgiving game against Texas Tech and was knocked out with a concussion in the 2nd quarter. Swoopes played the rest of the game and after the Longhorns took the lead in the 4th quarter, the Red Raiders scored twice more and won 48–45, bringing the Longhorns record to 4–7 with 1 game to play. Heard only played sparingly in the win at Baylor.

Heard completed his freshman year appearing in 12 games, starting 10 of them and winning 4. He passed for 1214 yards and ran for 556 yards, with 8 total TDs and 5 interceptions. He had two games with over 100 yards rushing and two games with over 200 yards passing.

In March 2016, Heard suffered a shoulder injury, which would keep him sidelined for the remainder of spring practice. As a result, he fell behind Tyrone Swoopes and Shane Buechele in the quarterback competition. Heard began his transition from quarterback to wide receiver during the summer and the position change became official by the first week of fall practice.

Heard played WR in the 2016 season and developed a good chemistry with true freshman QB Shane Buechele, playing in multiple formations as one of 10 WRs in heavy rotation for the longhorns. Heard scored 3 receiving touchdowns in the first 6 games of the season, 2 against UTEP, and one against Iowa St. Heard caught a career long 68 yard pass in the win versus Notre Dame.

In 2017, Heard played in 12 games, starting none. He had 20 receptions for a 156 yards and 1 TD. He also rushed 18 times for 2 TDs and complete 2 out of 3 passes for 18 yards. One of his touchdown receptions was in the first OT of a double overtime win over Kansas State.

=== College statistics ===
| Season | Team | GP | Passing | | | | | | | Rushing | | | Receiving | | |
| Season | Team | GP | Cmp | Att | Pct | Yds | TD | Int | Rtg | Att | Yds | TD | Rec | Yds | TD |
|---|---|---|---|---|---|---|---|---|---|---|---|---|---|---|---|
| 2015 | Texas | 12 | 92 | 159 | 57.9 | 1,214 | 5 | 5 | 126.1 | 140 | 561 | 3 | 1 | 3 | 0 |
| 2016 | Texas | — | 0 | 0 | 0 | 0 | 0 | 0 | 0 | 1 | -12 | 0 | 24 | 266 | 3 |
| 2017 | Texas | 12 | 2 | 3 | 66.7 | 18 | 0 | 0 | 117.1 | 18 | 58 | 2 | 20 | 156 | 1 |
| Totals | | 24 | 94 | 162 | 58.0 | 1,232 | 5 | 5 | 126.3 | 159 | 607 | 5 | 45 | 425 | 4 |

== Professional career ==
Pre-draft measurables
| Height | Weight | Arm length | Hand span | 40-yard dash | 10-yard split | 20-yard split | 20-yard shuttle | Three-cone drill | Vertical jump | Broad jump | Bench press |
|---|---|---|---|---|---|---|---|---|---|---|---|
| 6 ft 1 1/8 in (1.86 m) | 201 lb (91 kg) | 31 7/8 in (0.81 m) | 8 7/8 in (0.23 m) | 4.55 s | 1.57 s | 2.57 s | 4.44 s | 7.16 s | 34.5 in (0.88 m) | 9 ft 8 in (2.95 m) | 19 reps |
All values from Pro Day

=== Dallas Renegades ===
Heard was selected in the 2020 XFL draft by the Dallas Renegades during the open rounds. He was waived on February 25, 2020.

==== Team 9 ====
Heard signed with the XFL's Team 9 practice squad, and then was re-signed by the Renegades on March 9, 2020. He had his contract terminated when the league suspended operations on April 10.

=== Frisco Fighters ===
In 2021, Heard played for the Frisco Fighters of the Indoor Football League. In his first year with the Fighters, Heard helped the Fighters clinch a playoff berth and advance as far as the IFL semifinals. Heard would re-sign with the Fighters for the 2022 season. Heard would be released by the Fighters on May 18, 2022.
