= Chris Warren III =

American football player (born 1996)

No. 34
- Position: Running back

Personal information
- Born: June 6, 1996 (age 30); Seattle, Washington, U.S.
- Listed height: 6 ft 2 in (1.88 m)
- Listed weight: 246 lb (112 kg)

Career information
- High school: Rockwall (Rockwall, Texas)
- College: Texas
- NFL draft: 2018: undrafted

Career history
- Oakland Raiders (2018)
- Stats at Pro Football Reference

Chris Warren III (born June 6, 1996) is an American former football running back. He played college football at University of Texas and signed with the Oakland Raiders as an undrafted free agent in 2018.

== Early life and college ==
Warren was a high school All-American running back, attending the University of Texas. There he set their single-game freshman rushing record with 276 yards and four touchdowns against Texas Tech University late in 2015. In 2017 he was moved to tight end. Going in to the combine he told teams he would do whatever they needed him to, but that he fully intended to play running back in the NFL.

== Professional career ==
Pre-draft measurables
Height	Weight	Arm length	Hand span	40-yard dash	10-yard split	20-yard split	20-yard shuttle	Three-cone drill	Vertical jump	Broad jump	Bench press
6 ft 2 in (1.88 m)	247 lb (112 kg)	32 in (0.81 m)	10 in (0.25 m)	4.51 s	1.59 s	2.66 s	4.18 s	6.98 s	33 in (0.84 m)	10 ft 1 in (3.07 m)	25 reps
All values from NFL Combine/Pro Day

Warren went undrafted in the 2018 NFL draft and signed with the Oakland Raiders as an undrafted free agent on May 7, 2018. After a strong preseason, Warren was placed on injured reserve on September 1, 2018 with a knee injury.

On July 28, 2019, Warren was waived by the Raiders.

== Personal life ==
He is the son of former Seattle Seahawks running back Chris Warren.
