= Kent Perkins =

American gridiron football player (born 1994)

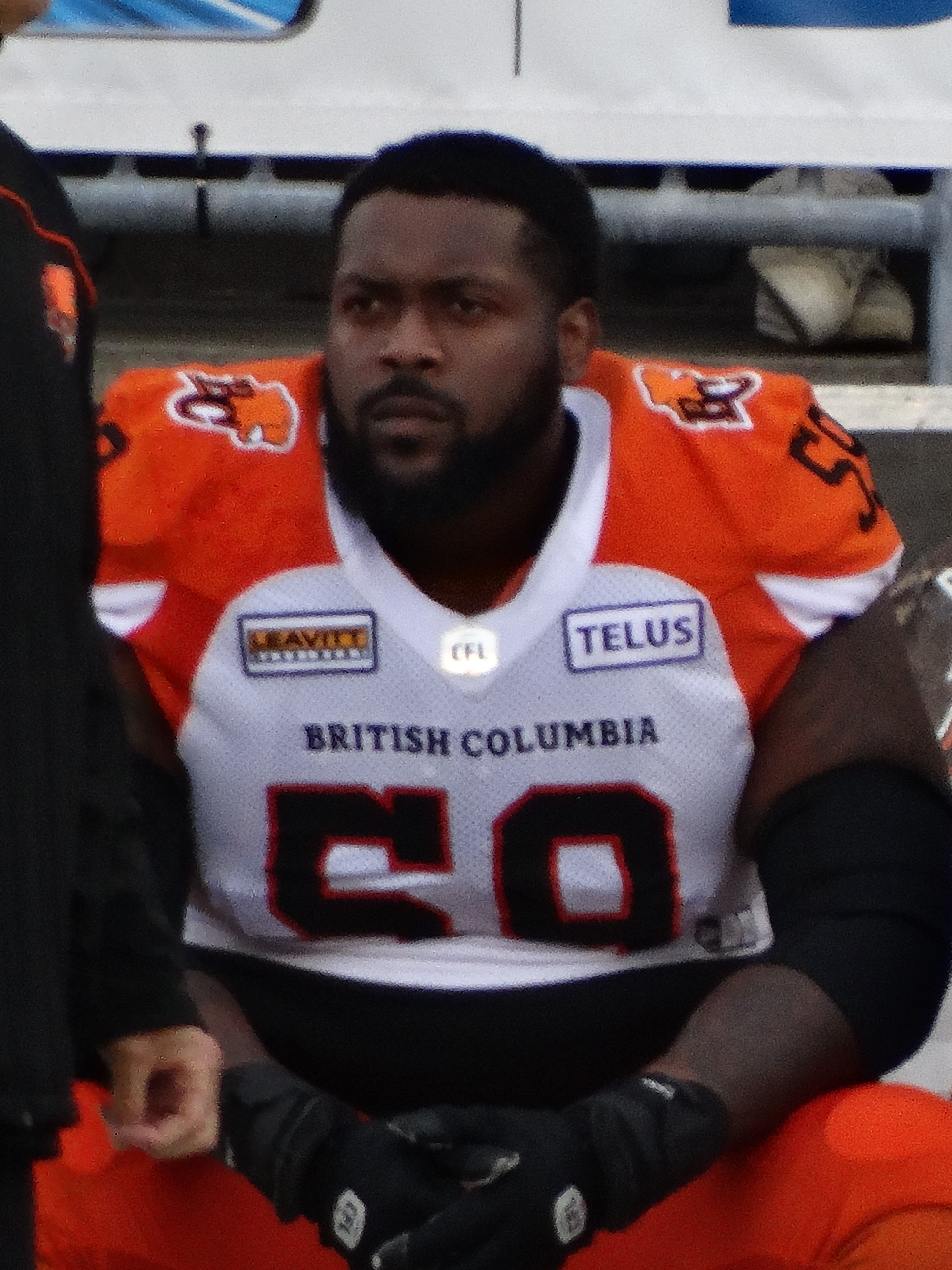
- Perkins with the BC Lions in 2022

Profile
- Position: Offensive tackle

Personal information
- Born: November 19, 1994 (age 31); Dallas, Texas, U.S.
- Listed height: 6 ft 5 in (1.96 m)
- Listed weight: 305 lb (138 kg)

Career information
- High school: Dallas (TX) Lake Highlands
- College: Texas
- NFL draft: 2017: undrafted

Career history
- Cincinnati Bengals (2017–2019); St. Louis BattleHawks (2020); BC Lions (2021–2024)

Career NFL statistics
- Games played: 1
- Stats at Pro Football Reference

Kent Perkins (born November 19, 1994) is an American professional football offensive tackle who is currently a free agent. He most recently played for the BC Lions of the Canadian Football League (CFL).

== College career ==
Perkins played college football for the Texas Longhorns.

== Professional career ==
=== Cincinnati Bengals ===
Perkins signed with the Cincinnati Bengals as an undrafted free agent on May 5, 2017. He was waived on September 2, 2017 and was signed to the practice squad the next day. He was promoted to the active roster on December 22, 2017 , and played 6 snaps in his only NFL game.

At the end of camp in 2018, Perkins was again waived by the Bengals and signed to the practice squad the next day. He was promoted to the active roster on December 28, 2018, but didn't play.

On August 13, 2019, Perkins was waived by the Bengals after announcing his retirement.

=== St. Louis BattleHawks ===
In October 2019, Perkins returned to football when he was drafted by the St. Louis BattleHawks in the 2020 XFL draft. He signed with the team and started all 5 games that season, but his contract was terminated when the league suspended operations on April 10, 2020 due to the Covid-19 pandemic.

=== The Spring League ===
Perkins was selected by the Alphas of The Spring League during its player selection draft on October 11, 2020.

=== BC Lions ===
Perkins signed with the BC Lions of the Canadian Football League (CFL) on December 29, 2020. After an injury to veteran offensive tackle Ryker Mathews, Perkins was thrust into the starting role. He thrived in his first season in the league, and was the club’s nominee for CFL Most Outstanding Lineman.

Early in the 2022 season, on July 7, 2022, Perkins and the Lions agreed to a new two-year contract extension. He played and started in all 18 regular season games and all post-season games from 2022 to 2024. He helped the Lions reach the West Division Finals in 2022 and 2023 and the playoffs in 2024.

As a pending free agent, Perkins was released on January 18, 2025 and became a free agent. He played in 67 total games for the Lions, with 2 fumbles and 2 recoveries.
