= D'Onta Foreman =

American football player (born 1996)

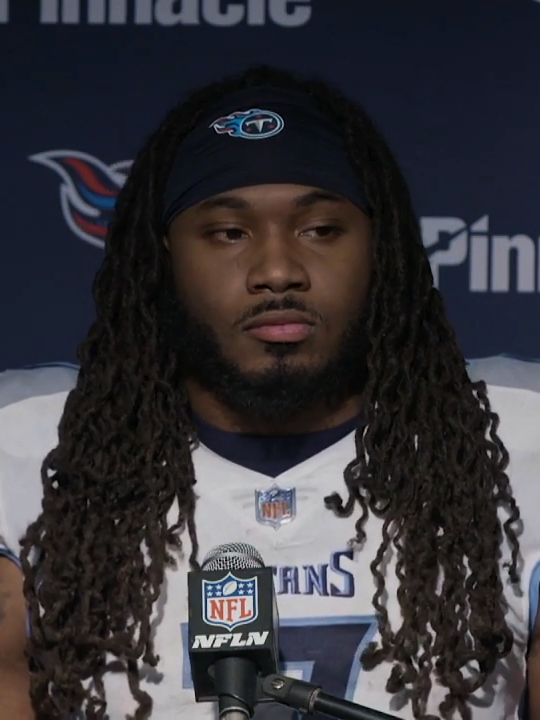
- Foreman with the Tennessee Titans in 2021

Profile
- Position: Running back

Personal information
- Born: April 24, 1996 (age 30); Texas City, Texas, U.S.
- Listed height: 6 ft 0 in (1.83 m)
- Listed weight: 235 lb (107 kg)

Career information
- High school: Texas City (TX)
- College: Texas (2014–2016)
- NFL draft: 2017: 3rd round, 89th overall pick

Career history
- Houston Texans (2017–2018); Indianapolis Colts (2019)*; Tennessee Titans (2020); Atlanta Falcons (2021)*; Tennessee Titans (2021); Carolina Panthers (2022); Chicago Bears (2023); Cleveland Browns (2024)
- * Offseason or practice squad member only

Awards and highlights
- Doak Walker Award (2016); Consensus All-American (2016); First-team All-Big 12 (2016); Earl Campbell Tyler Rose Award (2016)

Career NFL statistics as of 2024
- Rushing yards: 2,558
- Rushing average: 4.1
- Rushing touchdowns: 14
- Receptions: 40
- Receiving yards: 396
- Receiving touchdowns: 3
- Stats at Pro Football Reference

D'Onta Foreman (/diˈɒnteɪ/ dee-ON-tay; born April 24, 1996) is a former American professional football running back. He played college football for the Texas Longhorns and was selected by the Houston Texans in the third round of the 2017 NFL draft. Foreman has also played for the Tennessee Titans, Carolina Panthers, Chicago Bears and Cleveland Browns.

== Early life ==
Foreman attended Texas City High School in Texas City, Texas. He played running back and defensive end for the Stingarees football team. During his high school football career, Foreman rushed for 4,382 yards (8.2 YPC) with 61 touchdowns, including 2,102 yards and 31 touchdowns as a senior. He committed to the University of Texas at Austin to play college football under then-head coach Charlie Strong.

As a freshman in 2010, Foreman rushed 77 times for 391 yards (5.1 yards-per-carry) and two touchdowns. He was given honorable mention for All-District 24-4A as a running back.

As a sophomore in 2011, Foreman rushed for 816 yards and 10 touchdowns on 138 carries (5.9 yards-per-carry), while catching 20 passes for 224 yards and two touchdowns and returning eight kickoffs for 262 yards (32.7 YPR) and one touchdown. He was selected first-team All-District 24-4A and Special Teams Player of the Year in 2011.

As a junior in 2012, Foreman rushed 112 times for 1,073 yards (9.6 yards-per-carry) and 18 touchdowns while also tallying 40 tackles, 14 tackles for loss, one sack, and nine pressures. He helped Texas City to a 9–3 record and an appearance in the 4A DII area playoffs. Foreman was named first-team All-District 24-4A as a running back and second-team as a linebacker.

As a senior in 2013, Foreman rushed for 2,102 yards and 31 touchdowns on 202 carries (10.4 yards-per-carry). He recorded 22 tackles, including 12 tackles for loss and five sacks, five pressures, one interception and returned kickoffs. While helping lead Texas City to a 12–1 record and an appearance in the 4A DII regional playoffs in 2013, Foreman rushed for over 100 yards in all but one game, including three 200-yard contests. He earned first-team All-District 24-4A honors as both a running back and a defensive end. Foreman was named second-team 4A All-State as a running back by the Associated Press in 2013 and also shared 2013 District 24-4A MVP honors with his brother, Armanti. Foreman participated in the 2014 Semper Fidelis All-American Bowl.

Foreman was chosen to the Houston Chronicle's Top 100 players in the Houston area. He was ranked the 67th best running back nationally and the 125th best player in the state of Texas by 247Sports. Scout ranked Foreman as the 68th best running back in the nation. ESPN ranked him as the 74th best running back in the country. Foreman was named the sixth best athlete recruit in the state by Dave Campbell's Texas Football Magazine.

== College career ==
Foreman attended and played college football at the University of Texas from 2014–2016.

Foreman played in seven games as a true freshman at Texas in the 2014 season, rushing 15 times for 73 yards.

As a sophomore in 2015, Foreman played in 10 games missing two due to injury. He scored his first collegiate rushing touchdown against Rice on September 12. On November 7 against Kansas, Foreman had a season-high 157 rushing yards and two rushing touchdowns in the victory over the Jayhawks. He rushed for 681 yards on 95 carries with five touchdowns.

Foreman entered his junior year in 2016 as the Longhorns' starting running back. On October 29, 2016, against Baylor, Foreman passed the 1,000 rushing yards for the season mark, becoming the first Texas Longhorn running back since Jamaal Charles in 2007, to do so. During this game, Foreman rushed for 250 yards on 32 carries, scoring two touchdowns. During the game against Texas Tech on November 5, 2016, in Lubbock, Texas, Foreman ran for 341 yards on 33 carries, with three touchdowns, helping lead the Longhorns to victory. This game was Foreman's career high for the Longhorns. On November 19, he had 51 carries for 250 yards and two touchdowns in a loss to Kansas. Overall, Foreman finished the 2016 season with 323 carries for 2,028 yards and 15 touchdowns.

On November 30, Foreman announced his decision to forgo his last year of eligibility and enter the 2017 NFL draft. On December 8, he was awarded the Doak Walker Award as the nation's top running back. Foreman was the recipient of the Earl Campbell Tyler Rose Award in recognition of his 2016 season.

== Professional career ==
External videos
- D'Onta Foreman Combine Interview
- Foreman's Injury makes Evaluation difficult

Pre-draft measurables
Height	Weight	Arm length	Hand span	Wingspan	40-yard dash	10-yard split	20-yard split	20-yard shuttle	Three-cone drill	Vertical jump	Broad jump	Bench press
6 ft 0 in (1.83 m)	233 lb (106 kg)	31 3/8 in (0.80 m)	10 1/8 in (0.26 m)	6 ft 3 5/8 in (1.92 m)	4.46 s	1.63 s	2.57 s	4.29 s	7.21 s	33 in (0.84 m)	10 ft 0 in (3.05 m)	18 reps
All values from NFL Combine/Texas' Pro Day

=== Houston Texans ===
==== 2017 season ====
The Houston Texans selected Foreman in the third round of the 2017 NFL draft. He was the seventh running back to be drafted in 2017. On June 16, 2017, the Texans signed Foreman to a four-year, $3.25 million contract that includes a signing bonus of $759,484.

External videos
- Texans draft D'Onta Foreman 89th overall
- D'Onta Foreman reacts to being drafted

Foreman made his NFL debut during the season-opening 29–7 loss to the Jacksonville Jaguars and had a four-yard rush. In the next game against the Cincinnati Bengals on Thursday Night Football, his role in the offense expanded as he had 12 carries for 40 yards during the 13–9 road victory. The following week against the New England Patriots, Foreman had eight carries for 25 yards and two receptions for 65 yards in the 36–33 road loss.

During a Week 11 31–21 victory over the Arizona Cardinals, Foreman had 10 carries for 65 yards and his first two career touchdowns. However, on his second touchdown run, Foreman suffered a non-contact injury at the two-yard line and fell into the end zone and immediately grabbed his lower leg. It was later revealed that Foreman suffered a torn Achilles and was ruled out for the rest of the season. He was placed on injured reserve on November 22, 2017.

Foreman finished his rookie year with 78 carries for 327 yards and two touchdowns to go along with six receptions for 83 yards in 10 games and one start.

==== 2018 season ====
On September 1, 2018, Foreman was placed on the physically unable to perform list to start the season while recovering from his torn Achilles. He was activated off PUP to the active roster on December 4. Foreman made his season debut in Week 16 against the Philadelphia Eagles, recording two receptions for 28 yards and a touchdown during a narrow 32–30 road loss.

On August 4, 2019, Foreman was waived by the Texans, who cited poor work habits and being late to team meetings.

=== Indianapolis Colts ===
On August 5, 2019, Foreman was claimed off waivers by the Indianapolis Colts. He was placed on injured reserve on August 19 with a torn bicep. Foreman was waived five days later.

=== Tennessee Titans (first stint) ===
After sitting out the 2019 NFL season, Foreman had a tryout with the Tennessee Titans on August 17, 2020. On September 29, he was signed to the Titans' practice squad. Foreman was elevated to the active roster on October 31 for the Week 8 matchup against the Bengals and reverted to the practice squad after the game. He was promoted to the active roster on November 7, 2020. During a Week 10 34–17 loss to the Indianapolis Colts, Foreman had seven carries for 18 yards and a five-yard touchdown reception. The touchdown marked his first with the team and his first overall since Week 16 of the 2018 season.

Foreman appeared in six games as a backup to Derrick Henry and finished the 2020 season with 22 carries for 95 yards to go along with a five-yard touchdown reception.

=== Atlanta Falcons ===
On August 3, 2021, the Atlanta Falcons held a workout with Foreman. He subsequently signed with the team six days later. Foreman was released on August 31, but was re-signed to the practice squad the next day. He was released again on September 3.

=== Tennessee Titans (second stint) ===
On November 2, 2021, Foreman was signed to the Titans practice squad after Derrick Henry was placed on injured reserve with a foot injury. Foreman was promoted to the active roster four days later.

During Week 12 against the Patriots, Foreman had 19 carries for 109 yards in the 36–13 road loss. Both Foreman and fellow running back Dontrell Hilliard rushed for over 100 yards in that game, the first time the Titans had two 100-yard rushers in a single game since Chris Johnson and LenDale White in 2008. Two weeks later against the Jaguars, he recorded 13 carries for 47 yards and his first rushing touchdown since 2017 in the 20–0 shutout victory.

During Week 15 against the Pittsburgh Steelers, Foreman rushed 22 times for 108 yards in the 19–13 road loss. In the next game against the San Francisco 49ers, he had nine carries for 17 yards and a touchdown during the 20–17 victory. The following week against the Miami Dolphins, Foreman recorded 26 carries for 132 yards and a touchdown in the 34–3 victory.

Foreman finished the 2021 season with 133 carries for 566 yards and three touchdowns to go along with nine receptions for 123 yards in nine games and three starts. Following Henry's injury in Week 8, Foreman was credited for helping the Titans reach the playoffs and win the AFC South in his absence. In the Divisional Round against the Bengals, Foreman had four carries for 66 yards during the 19–16 loss.

=== Carolina Panthers ===
On March 16, 2022, Foreman signed a one-year contract with the Carolina Panthers.

Due to a mid-season trade involving starting running back Christian McCaffrey, Foreman had his largest role in an offense yet, becoming the lead running back in the Panthers' backfield, though he shared time with sophomore back Chuba Hubbard. During Week 7 against the Tampa Bay Buccaneers, Foreman had 15 carries for 118 yards and two receptions for 27 yards in the 21–3 victory. In the next game against the Falcons, he recorded 26 carries for 118 yards and three touchdowns during the 37–34 overtime road loss. During Week 16 against the playoff-hopeful Detroit Lions, Foreman rushed 21 times for a career-high 165 yards and a touchdown in the 37–23 upset victory.

Foreman finished the season setting career-highs in carries with 203, rushing yards with 914, and rushing touchdowns with five touchdowns while also catching five passes for 26 yards in 17 games and nine starts.

=== Chicago Bears ===
On March 16, 2023, Foreman signed a one-year contract with the Chicago Bears.

Foreman was a healthy scratch for four consecutive games from Week 2 to 5 before becoming the Bears' starting running back in Week 6 following injuries to Khalil Herbert and Roschon Johnson. During Week 7 against the Las Vegas Raiders, Foreman had 16 carries for 89 yards and two touchdowns to go along with three receptions for 31 yards and a touchdown in the 30–12 victory. He was named the FedEx Ground Player of the Week for his efforts. Three weeks later against his former team, the Panthers, Foreman recorded 21 carries for 80 yards and a touchdown. In the next game against the Lions, he had six carries for 14 yards and a touchdown during the 31–26 road loss.

Foreman finished the 2023 season with 109 carries for 425 yards and four touchdowns to go along with 11 receptions for 77 yards and a touchdown in nine games and eight starts.

=== Cleveland Browns ===
On March 22, 2024, Foreman signed with the Cleveland Browns.

Foreman finished the 2024 season with 71 carries for 232 yards to go along with six carries for 54 yards in 11 games and three starts and then became a free agent.

== Career statistics ==
=== NFL ===
==== Regular season ====
Year	Team	Games		Rushing					Receiving					Fumbles	
Year	Team	GP	GS	Att	Yds	Avg	Lng	TD	Rec	Yds	Avg	Lng	TD	Fum	Lost
2017	HOU	10	1	78	327	4.2	39	2	6	83	13.8	34	0	2	1
2018	HOU	1	0	7	−1	−0.1	2	0	2	28	14.0	20T	1	1	0
2020	TEN	6	0	22	95	4.3	15	0	1	5	5.0	5T	1	0	0
2021	TEN	9	3	133	566	4.3	35	3	9	123	13.7	39	0	2	1
2022	CAR	17	9	203	914	4.5	60	5	5	26	5.2	23	0	0	0
2023	CHI	9	8	109	425	3.9	22	4	11	77	7.0	17	1	1	0
2024	CLE	11	3	71	232	3.3	25	0	6	54	9.0	16	0	2	1
Career		63	24	623	2,558	4.1	60	14	40	396	9.9	39	3	9	3

==== Postseason ====
Year	Team	Games		Rushing					Receiving					Fumbles	
Year	Team	GP	GS	Att	Yds	Avg	Lng	TD	Rec	Yds	Avg	Lng	TD	Fum	Lost
2018	HOU	1	0	1	3	3.0	3	0	0	0	0.0	0	0	0	0
2021	TEN	1	0	4	66	16.5	45	0	0	0	0.0	0	0	0	0
Career		2	0	5	69	13.8	45	0	0	0	0.0	0	0	0	0

=== College ===
Season	Team	Games	Rushing					Receiving		
Season	Team	GP	Att	Yds	Avg	Lng	TD	Rec	Yds	TD
2014	Texas	7	15	73	4.9	34	0	1	7	0
2015	Texas	10	95	681	7.2	93	5	5	64	0
2016	Texas	11	323	2,028	6.3	74	15	7	75	0
Total		28	433	2,782	6.4	93	20	13	146	0

=== High school ===
Season	Rushing			
Season	Att	Yds	Avg	TD
2010	77	391	5.1	2
2011	138	816	5.9	10
2012	112	1,073	9.6	18
2013	202	2,102	10.4	31
Career	529	4,392	8.3	61
All values sourced by the University of Texas

== Personal life ==
Foreman's twin brother, Armanti, played college football for the Texas Longhorns as a wide receiver. While attending the University of Texas, Foreman became a member of the Big 12 Commissioner's Honor Roll in the Fall of 2014.

On April 24, 2017, Foreman revealed that he had been coping with his infant son's death in 2016. Three months later on July 16, Foreman was arrested in Austin on charges of possession of marijuana and unlawful carrying of a weapon. According to the University of Texas police department, officers initially responded to a report of marijuana smell coming from three cars parked outside a residence hall. Foreman was taken into custody where he later was released on bond, while six others were cited for possession of marijuana and free to leave the scene.
