= Holton Hill =

American football player (born 1997)

Profile
- Position: Cornerback

Personal information
- Born: March 28, 1997 (age 29); Houston, Texas, U.S.
- Listed height: 6 ft 2 in (1.88 m)
- Listed weight: 196 lb (89 kg)

Career information
- High school: Lamar (Houston, Texas)
- College: Texas
- NFL draft: 2018: undrafted

Career history
- Minnesota Vikings (2018–2020); Indianapolis Colts (2021)*; Dallas Cowboys (2021)*; Cincinnati Bengals (2021)*; DC Defenders (2023)*; Saskatchewan Roughriders (2024)*
- * Offseason or practice squad member only

Career NFL statistics
- Total tackles: 73
- Sacks: 1.0
- Forced fumbles: 0
- Fumble recoveries: 1
- Interceptions: 1
- Stats at Pro Football Reference

Holton Hill (born March 28, 1997) is an American football cornerback. He played college football at Texas and has played in the NFL for the Minnesota Vikings.

== Early life ==
Hill attended Lamar High School in Houston, Texas. As a junior, he tallied 41 tackles, two tackles for loss, 11 pass breakups and one interception. As a senior, he caught six passes for 93 yards and two touchdowns, returned 19 punts for 387 yards as well as five kickoffs for 227 yards, along with leading the state with 11 interceptions on defense. He was an All-American honoree and was named a first-team All-American by MaxPreps. Hill committed to play football for Texas in January 2015, choosing the Longhorns over schools such as Alabama, LSU, and Baylor.

Hill was also an outstanding track and field athlete at Lamar. He earned first-place finishes at the 2014 District 20-6A meet in the 110-meter hurdles (14.49 seconds), high jump (5 ft 8 in (1.73 m) and long jump (22 ft 2.75 in (6.7755 m), and also ran a leg on the Texans' victorious 4 × 100 m relay (41.75 seconds). As a senior in 2015, he posted a personal-best time of 13.92 seconds in the 110m hurdles at the UIL 6A state championships, placing fifth in the finals. He also won the long jump event at the 6A area championships with a leap of 23 ft 5.50 in (7.1501 m).

== College career ==
As a true freshman in 2015, Hill played in 11 games, tallying 49 tackles, three interceptions and one fumble recovery.

In 2016, as a sophomore, Hill played in six games, making three starts. He had 23 tackles along with one pass deflection.

As a junior in 2017, Hill played in and started the first nine games of the season for Texas, tallying 51 tackles, two interceptions, three defensive touchdowns, six pass breakups and a forced fumble. However, Hill's season ended on November 7 when he was suspended by head coach Tom Herman for a violation of team rules. After the season, Hill declared for the 2018 NFL draft.

== Professional career ==
External videos
- Hill's NFL Combine workout

Pre-draft measurables
Height	Weight	Arm length	Hand span	40-yard dash	10-yard split	20-yard split	20-yard shuttle	Three-cone drill	Vertical jump	Broad jump	Bench press
6 ft 1 5/8 in (1.87 m)	196 lb (89 kg)	32 in (0.81 m)	9 5/8 in (0.24 m)	4.49 s	1.53 s	2.63 s	4.15 s	6.83 s	31 in (0.79 m)	10 ft 0 in (3.05 m)	14 reps
All values from NFL Combine

=== Minnesota Vikings ===
Hill signed a three-year $1,725,000 contract with the Minnesota Vikings as an undrafted free agent on April 30, 2018.

In Week 7, he recorded his first career interception along with two pass deflections and two total tackles. He played in all 16 games with three starts, recording 36 combined tackles, seven passes defensed and an interception.

On April 5, 2019, Hill was suspended the first four games of the 2019 season for violating the league's policy on performance-enhancing substances. He was suspended an additional four games again for violating the NFL policy on substances of abuse. He was reinstated from suspension on October 25, 2019, and activated on November 2, 2019. In week 9 against the Kansas City Chiefs, Hill recovered a fumble forced by teammate Mike Hughes on Mecole Hardman during a kickoff return in the 26–23 loss.

In Week 2 of the 2020 season against the Indianapolis Colts, Hill recorded his first career sack on Philip Rivers during the 28–11 loss. He was placed on the commissioner's exempt list on November 7, and was placed on injured reserve on November 10, 2020. He was waived from injured reserve on December 8, 2020.

=== Indianapolis Colts ===
On July 29, 2021, Hill was signed by the Colts. He was waived on August 31, 2021.

=== Dallas Cowboys ===
On September 22, 2021, Hill was signed by the Dallas Cowboys to their practice squad. He was released on October 5.

=== Cincinnati Bengals ===
On October 12, 2021, Hill was signed to the Cincinnati Bengals practice squad. He was released on December 20, 2021.

=== DC Defenders ===
On November 17, 2022, Hill was drafted by the DC Defenders of the XFL.

=== Saskatchewan Roughriders ===
On March 1, 2024. Hill signed with the Saskatchewan Roughriders of the Canadian Football League (CFL). He was released at the end of training camp.
