= Patrick Vahe =

American football player (born 1996)

No. 66
- Position: Guard

Personal information
- Born: March 4, 1996 (age 30); Euless, Texas, U.S.
- Listed height: 6 ft 3 in (1.91 m)
- Listed weight: 325 lb (147 kg)

Career information
- High school: Trinity (Euless, Texas)
- College: Texas
- NFL draft: 2019: undrafted

Career history
- Baltimore Ravens (2019)*; Los Angeles Wildcats (2020)
- * Offseason or practice squad member only

Awards and highlights
- Freshman All-American (2015)

Patrick Vahe (born April 3, 1996) is an American former professional football guard.

== Early life ==
Playing high school football at Euless (Texas) Trinity, Vahe was ranked as the No. 4 prospect at guard and No. 79 overall among the ESPN 300. In July 2013, he committed to play college football for the University of Texas.

== College career ==
He played college football for the Texas Longhorns from 2015 to 2018. He appeared in 48 games for the Longhorns, including 45 games as a starter. He was named to the Outland Trophy preseason watch list in 2018.

== Professional career ==
Pre-draft measurables
| Height | Weight | Arm length | Hand span | 40-yard dash | 10-yard split | 20-yard split | 20-yard shuttle | Three-cone drill | Vertical jump | Broad jump | Bench press |
|---|---|---|---|---|---|---|---|---|---|---|---|
| 6 ft 2 5/8 in (1.90 m) | 325 lb (147 kg) | 33 1/2 in (0.85 m) | 10 5/8 in (0.27 m) | 5.48 s | 1.91 s | 3.09 s | 4.95 s | 7.96 s | 29.5 in (0.75 m) | 8 ft 8 in (2.64 m) | 30 reps |
All values from Pro Day

=== Baltimore Ravens ===
Vahe was signed by the Baltimore Ravens in May 2019, but he was released during final roster cuts on August 30, 2019.

=== Los Angeles Wildcats ===
In October, he was picked up by the Los Angeles Wildcats in the 2020 XFL draft. He had his contract terminated when the league suspended operations on April 10, 2020.

== Personal life ==
A native of Texas, Vahe is of Tongan/Polynesian heritage.
