= Tyrone Swoopes =

American football player (born 1994)

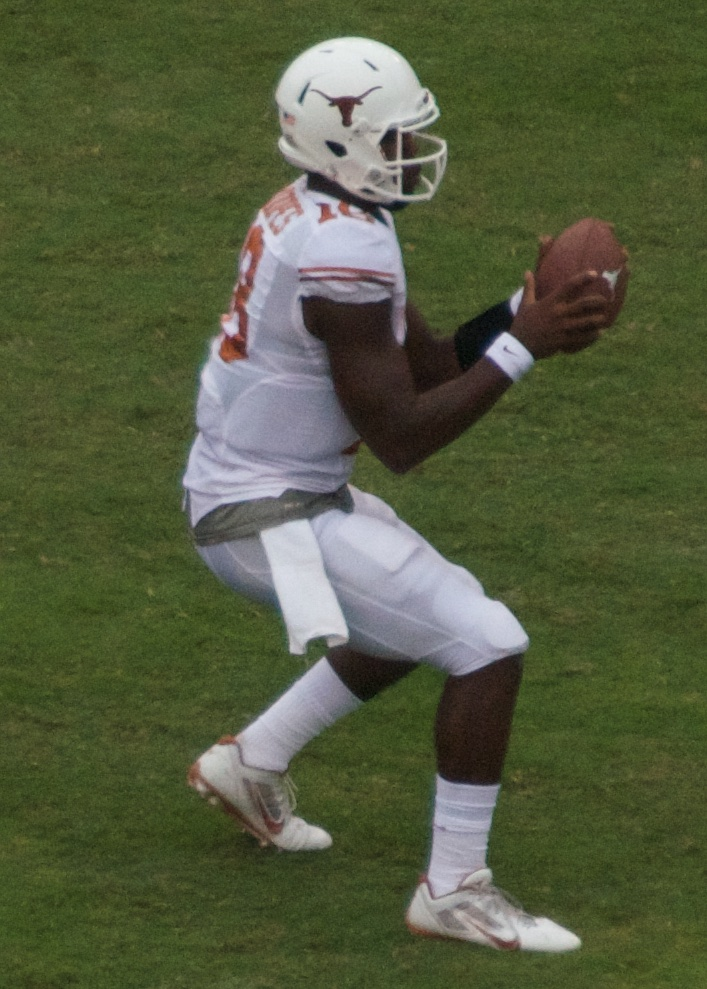
- Swoopes with the Texas Longhorns in 2014

No. 46
- Position: Tight end

Personal information
- Born: November 14, 1994 (age 31); Stephenville, Texas, U.S.
- Listed height: 6 ft 4 in (1.93 m)
- Listed weight: 254 lb (115 kg)

Career information
- High school: Whitewright (Whitewright, Texas)
- College: Texas (2013–2016)
- NFL draft: 2017: undrafted

Career history
- Seattle Seahawks (2017–2019); Philadelphia Eagles (2020)*; Washington Football Team (2020–2021)*
- * Offseason or practice squad member only

Career NFL statistics
- Receptions: 2
- Receiving yards: 28
- Stats at Pro Football Reference

Alphonso Tyrone Swoopes Jr. (born November 14, 1994) is an American former professional football player who was a tight end for the Seattle Seahawks of the National Football League (NFL). He played college football as a quarterback for the Texas Longhorns and signed with the Seahawks as an undrafted free agent in 2017. He was also a member of the Philadelphia Eagles and Washington Football Team.

== Early life ==
Swoopes was a highly recruited high school football player from a small town (Whitewright, TX). He played in the 2013 U.S. Army All-American Bowl, and consistently was rated among the top 10 quarterback recruits in the country. In addition to football, he played guard in basketball, in baseball, and competed in the long jump, triple jump, 4 × 400 m, 4 × 200 m, 4 × 100 m and shot put in track and field. A 4-star recruit, he committed to play college football at the University of Texas over offers from Alabama, Auburn, Baylor, Notre Dame, Ohio State, Oklahoma, Stanford, TCU, Texas A&M, Texas Tech, and UCLA.

== College career ==
=== 2013 season ===
In his lone season with head coach Mack Brown, Swoopes saw limited play in the 2013 season, coming in mostly for relief in six games.

On November 2, Swoopes completed his first career collegiate pass against Kansas. On November 28, he had his first career rushing touchdown, which came in the fourth quarter against Texas Tech. On December 30, Swoopes saw time in the 2013 Alamo Bowl against Oregon. In the bowl game, Swoopes had eight rushes for 38 yards.

=== 2014 season ===
Swoopes entered the 2014 season with a new head coach, Charlie Strong.

In the first game of the 2014 season, Swoopes entered the game only for the last series, but after a career-ending injury to David Ash, Swoopes was thrown into the unexpected role of starter for the second game against BYU. He remained the starter for the rest of the season.

Swoopes described the season as one of "ups and downs." Despite solid play by Swoopes, his debut game against BYU represented the worst home loss, 41–7, for Texas since 1997. Swoopes had another solid performance the following week against #12 UCLA, but despite a late lead, the Longhorns again came up short. Swoopes led Texas to a win over unranked Kansas, then a loss to #7 Baylor before throwing for a career-high 334 yards in a close loss to Oklahoma. That was followed by a gutsy win over Iowa State in which Swoopes, who set a career-high for total offense, led the Longhorns on a game-winning drive with only 28 seconds left, after having led them on a touchdown drive only a minute earlier. The next game brought a shutout loss to #11 Kansas State. Then the team won three straight over Texas Tech, #24 West Virginia, and Oklahoma State. The highlight of the season was arguably the upset win of then #24 West Virginia, which was not a great game for Swoopes, but was a necessary one for Texas to become bowl-eligible. The next week, against Oklahoma State, Swoopes had the best game of his career, with 305 yards, two touchdowns, and a career-high quarterback rating of 170.4. In the last game of the regular season, Texas was beaten badly by #5 TCU in a game in which Swoopes threw a career-high four interceptions.

Swoopes and the Longhorns went to the Texas Bowl where they met an old Southwest Conference rival Arkansas, but the offense, which struggled all season due to injury and disciplinary losses to the offensive line, was able to muster only 59 yards of offense. It was Swoopes's worst game. He produced only 25 yards of total offense (57 yards of passing and −32 yards of rushing) and registered a career low quarterback rating of 63.2. His performance during the last two games of the season and his 5–7 record as a starter left analysts questioning his role in 2015. Before the bowl game, Max Olson of ESPN wrote of him "he will have to fight for his job next year."

=== 2015 season ===
Swoopes played a significant role for the Longhorns in the 2015 season. He started the season shaky in a loss in the season opener against Notre Dame; Swoopes was 7-of-22 for 93 yards and had ten rushing attempts for 17 yards. On September 26, he had his first rushing touchdown of the season against Oklahoma State. In the next game against TCU, he had his first passing touchdown of the season. In the next game against Oklahoma, Swoopes had a passing touchdown and a rushing touchdown. Two weeks later, against Kansas State, he had a career-high three rushing touchdowns to along with 50 rushing yards. On November 7, Swoopes had a career-day against Kansas. Against the Jayhawks, he had 98 yards passing and one passing touchdown. In addition, he had a career-high four rushing touchdowns to along with 59 rushing yards. On November 26, against Texas Tech, he had 98 rushing yards and two rushing touchdowns. He started at quarterback in the last game of the year at #12 Baylor. Texas won the game in an upset by a score of 23–17. In the victory, Swoopes had a passing touchdown and a rushing touchdown.

Overall, Swoopes was 47-of-93 for 537 passing yards, four touchdowns, and one interception. On the ground, he had 451 rushing yards and 12 rushing touchdowns on 74 attempts.

=== 2016 season ===
Swoopes started the 2016 season by appearing in the game against #10 Notre Dame. He had a strong performance in the 50–47 2OT victory. He had 13 carries for 53 yards and three touchdowns, including the game-winner. A few weeks later, against Oklahoma State, Swoopes had six carries for 24 yards and two touchdowns. Over the course of the rest of the season, Swoopes appeared in seven games and recorded two other rushing touchdowns.

Overall, in the 2016 season, Swoopes had 54 rushes for 174 yards and seven touchdowns.

=== College statistics ===
Season	Team	GP	Passing							Rushing		
Season	Team	GP	Cmp	Att	Pct	Yds	TD	Int	Rtg	Att	Yds	TD
2013	Texas	6	5	13	38.5	26	0	0	55.3	20	79	1
2014	Texas	12	224	384	58.3	2,409	13	11	116.5	108	262	4
2015	Texas	11	47	93	50.5	537	4	1	111.1	74	451	12
2016	Texas	11	5	9	55.6	66	0	1	94.9	54	174	7
Career		40	281	499	56.3	3,038	17	13	113.5	256	966	24

=== Awards ===
Results
Won
Honorable mention
Nominated

Tyrone Swoopes' college career awards
Award	Date	Team Last Played	Source(s)
Big 12 Commissioner’s Honor Roll ^{‡}	Spring 2014	—	
^{†} Awarded by own team^{‡} Shared

== Professional career ==
Pre-draft measurables
Height	Weight	Arm length	Hand span	40-yard dash	10-yard split	20-yard split	20-yard shuttle	Three-cone drill	Vertical jump	Broad jump	Bench press
6 ft 4 1/8 in (1.93 m)	246 lb (112 kg)	33 1/4 in (0.84 m)	9 5/8 in (0.24 m)	4.75 s	1.65 s	2.74 s	4.36 s	6.89 s	35.0 in (0.89 m)	9 ft 7 in (2.92 m)	19 reps
All values from Pro Day

=== Seattle Seahawks ===
Swoopes signed with the Seattle Seahawks as an undrafted free agent on May 12, 2017. He was waived on September 2, 2017, and was signed to the Seahawks' practice squad the next day. He was promoted to the active roster on December 30, 2017.

On September 1, 2018, Swoopes was waived by the Seahawks. He was re-signed to the practice squad on October 9, 2018. He was promoted to the active roster on October 13, 2018, and started the game the next day against Oakland during which he had one reception. He was waived on October 27, 2018, and was re-signed to the practice squad. He was released on November 6, 2018, but re-signed on November 28.

On January 7, 2019, Swoopes signed a reserve/future contract with the Seahawks. He was waived/injured on August 3, 2019, and placed on injured reserve. He was released on August 14, 2019. He was re-signed to the practice squad on October 15. He was promoted to the active roster on November 22, 2019. He played in 5 of the last 6 games for the Seahawks, including two starts.

Swoopes did not receive an exclusive-rights free agent tender from the team after the season, and became a free agent on March 18, 2020. Swoopes had a tryout with the Arizona Cardinals on August 14, 2020, and with the Jacksonville Jaguars on August 20, 2020.

=== Philadelphia Eagles ===
He visited the Philadelphia Eagles on August 23, 2020 and was signed by the team on August 25. He was waived soon after on September 3, 2020.

=== Washington Commanders ===
On December 23, 2020, Swoopes was signed to the Washington Commanders's practice squad. He played one game for Washington that season. Swoopes re-signed with the team on January 11, 2021, but was released after failing to report to training camp.

== NFL career statistics ==
Year	Team	Games		Receiving				
Year	Team	GP	GS	Rec	Yds	Avg	Lng	TD
2017	SEA	1	0	0	0	0	0	0
2018	SEA	1	1	1	23	23	23	1
2019	SEA	5	2	1	5	5	5	0
2021	WAS	1	0	0	0	0	0	0
Career		8	3	2	28	14	23	1

== Post-playing career ==
In July 2022, Swoopes became an assistant football and track coaches for 2A Tom Bean High School near Sherman, Texas. In 2025, Swoopes was hired as the tight ends coach at Lindale High School in Lindale, Texas.
