= 2016 Texas A&M Aggies football team =

American college football season

2016 Texas A&M Aggies football

Texas Bowl, L 28–33 vs. Kansas State
- Conference: Southeastern Conference
- Western Division
- Record: 8–5 (4–4 SEC)
- Head coach: Kevin Sumlin (5th season)
- Offensive coordinator: Noel Mazzone (1st season)
- Offensive scheme: Spread
- Defensive coordinator: John Chavis (2nd season)
- Base defense: Multiple 4–3
- Home stadium: Kyle Field

2016 Southeastern Conference football standings
	Conf.			Overall
Team	W		L	W		L
Eastern Division
No. 14 Florida x	6	–	2	9	–	4
No. 22 Tennessee	4	–	4	9	–	4
Georgia	4	–	4	8	–	5
Kentucky	4	–	4	7	–	6
South Carolina	3	–	5	6	–	7
Vanderbilt	3	–	5	6	–	7
Missouri*	2	–	6	4	–	8
Western Division
No. 2 Alabama x$^	8	–	0	14	–	1
No. 24 Auburn	5	–	3	8	–	5
No. 13 LSU	5	–	3	8	–	4
Texas A&M	4	–	4	8	–	5
Arkansas	3	–	5	7	–	6
Mississippi State	3	–	5	6	–	7
Ole Miss*	2	–	6	5	–	7
Championship: Alabama 54, Florida 16
^ – College Football Playoff participant; $ – Conference champion; x – Division champion/co-champions; * Ole Miss and Missouri vacated all wins due to NCAA violations.; Rankings from AP Poll

The 2016 Texas A&M Aggies football team represented Texas A&M University in the 2016 NCAA Division I FBS football season. The Aggies played their home games at Kyle Field in College Station, Texas and competed in the Western Division of the Southeastern Conference (SEC). They were led by fifth-year head coach Kevin Sumlin. They finished the season 8–5, 4–4 in SEC play to finish in fourth place in the Western Division. They were invited to the Texas Bowl where they lost to Kansas State.

== Preseason ==
=== Recruiting class ===
In the 2016 recruiting class, Texas A&M signed 21 players (22 including transfer QB Trevor Knight), 8 of which were included in the ESPN 300 and 8 in the 247 Sports top 250. The class was ranked 20th in the nation by ESPN, 17th by Rivals, 18th by 247, and 20th by Scout.

College recruiting information (2016)
Name	Hometown	School	Height	Weight	40^{‡}	Commit date
Austin Anderson; OG	Mineola, TX	Mineola HS	6 ft 4 in (1.93 m)	285 lb (129 kg)	–	Apr 27, 2015
Austin Anderson; OG	Recruit ratings: Scout: Rivals: 247Sports: ESPN:					
Riley Anderson; OT	Mineola, TX	Mineola HS	6 ft 5 in (1.96 m)	280 lb (130 kg)	–	Apr 27, 2015
Riley Anderson; OT	Recruit ratings: Scout: Rivals: 247Sports: ESPN:					
Rakeem Boyd; RB	Houston, TX	Stratford HS	5 ft 11 in (1.80 m)	198 lb (90 kg)	4.58	Aug 29, 2015
Rakeem Boyd; RB	Recruit ratings: Scout: Rivals: 247Sports: ESPN:					
Clifford Chattman; S	New Orleans, LA	McDonogh 35 HS	6 ft 5 in (1.96 m)	173 lb (78 kg)	4.71	Feb 3, 2016
Clifford Chattman; S	Recruit ratings: Scout: Rivals: 247Sports: ESPN:					
Clyde Chriss; WR	New Orleans, LA	Warren Easton HS	6 ft 0 in (1.83 m)	170 lb (77 kg)	4.61	Jan 14, 2016
Clyde Chriss; WR	Recruit ratings: Scout: Rivals: 247Sports: ESPN:					
Quartney Davis; WR	Houston, TX	Langham Creek HS	6 ft 3 in (1.91 m)	181 lb (82 kg)	4.57	Feb 3, 2016
Quartney Davis; WR	Recruit ratings: Scout: Rivals: 247Sports: ESPN:					
Kellen Diesch; OT	Trophy Club, TX	Byron Nelson HS	6 ft 7 in (2.01 m)	270 lb (120 kg)	–	Nov 8, 2015
Kellen Diesch; OT	Recruit ratings: Scout: Rivals: 247Sports: ESPN:					
Tyrel Dodson; LB	Franklin, TN	Centennial HS	6 ft 1 in (1.85 m)	230 lb (100 kg)	4.87	Jun 6, 2015
Tyrel Dodson; LB	Recruit ratings: Scout: Rivals: 247Sports: ESPN:					
Travon Fuller; CB	Athens, TX	Athens HS	5 ft 11 in (1.80 m)	165 lb (75 kg)	4.40	Aug 1, 2016
Travon Fuller; CB	Recruit ratings: Scout: Rivals: 247Sports: ESPN:					
Aaron Hansford; ATH/WR	Washington, D.C.	St. John's College HS	6 ft 3 in (1.91 m)	209 lb (95 kg)	4.51	Feb 3, 2016
Aaron Hansford; ATH/WR	Recruit ratings: Scout: Rivals: 247Sports: ESPN:					
Trevor Knight; QB	San Antonio, TX	University of Oklahoma	6 ft 1 in (1.85 m)	207 lb (94 kg)	–	Jan 4, 2016
Trevor Knight; QB	Recruit ratings: Scout: Rivals: 247Sports: ESPN:					
Justin Madubuike; DE	McKinney, TX	McKinney North HS	6 ft 3 in (1.91 m)	250 lb (110 kg)	4.59	Sep 18, 2015
Justin Madubuike; DE	Recruit ratings: Scout: Rivals: 247Sports: ESPN:					
Braden Mann; K	Cypress, TX	Cy-Fair HS	6 ft 0 in (1.83 m)	200 lb (91 kg)	–	Feb 5, 2015
Braden Mann; K	Recruit ratings: Scout: Rivals: 247Sports: ESPN:					
Ryan McCollum; OT	Spring, TX	Klein Oak HS	6 ft 5 in (1.96 m)	270 lb (120 kg)	–	Dec 13, 2015
Ryan McCollum; OT	Recruit ratings: Scout: Rivals: 247Sports: ESPN:					
Ikenna Okeke; S	Smyrna, TN	Smyrna HS	6 ft 2 in (1.88 m)	200 lb (91 kg)	4.61	Nov 25, 2015
Ikenna Okeke; S	Recruit ratings: Scout: Rivals: 247Sports: ESPN:					
Charles Oliver; CB	Fairfield, TX	Fairfield HS	6 ft 2 in (1.88 m)	182 lb (83 kg)	4.66	Apr 25, 2015
Charles Oliver; CB	Recruit ratings: Scout: Rivals: 247Sports: ESPN:					
Colton Prater; OG	Bossier City, LA	Airline HS	6 ft 4 in (1.93 m)	275 lb (125 kg)	5.52	Jun 7, 2015
Colton Prater; OG	Recruit ratings: Scout: Rivals: 247Sports: ESPN:					
Moses Reynolds; DB	San Antonio, TX	John Jay HS	6 ft 1 in (1.85 m)	185 lb (84 kg)	4.50	Oct 5, 2015
Moses Reynolds; DB	Recruit ratings: Scout: Rivals: 247Sports: ESPN:					
Alton Robinson; DE	Converse, TX	Judson HS	6 ft 3 in (1.91 m)	220 lb (100 kg)	4.84	Jun 11, 2015
Alton Robinson; DE	Recruit ratings: Scout: Rivals: 247Sports: ESPN:					
Kendrick Rogers; WR	Frankston, TX	Frankston HS	6 ft 4 in (1.93 m)	185 lb (84 kg)	4.74	Jun 8, 2015
Kendrick Rogers; WR	Recruit ratings: Scout: Rivals: 247Sports: ESPN:					
Nick Starkel; QB	Denton, TX	Liberty Christian HS	6 ft 4 in (1.93 m)	182 lb (83 kg)	4.95	Jan 21, 2016
Nick Starkel; QB	Recruit ratings: Scout: Rivals: 247Sports: ESPN:					
Trayveon Williams; RB	Houston, TX	C.E. King HS	5 ft 9 in (1.75 m)	182 lb (83 kg)	4.65	Nov 12, 2015
Trayveon Williams; RB	Recruit ratings: Scout: Rivals: 247Sports: ESPN:					
Overall recruit ranking: Scout: 20 Rivals: 17 247Sports: 18 ESPN: 20
‡ Refers to 40-yard dash; Note: In many cases, Scout, Rivals, 247Sports, On3, and ESPN may conflict in their listings of height, weight and 40 time.; In these cases, the average was taken. ESPN grades are on a 100-point scale.; Sources: "Texas A&M Football Commitment List 2016". Rivals.; "Texas A&M College Football Recruiting Commits 2016". Scout.; "Texas A&M Aggies Commits 2016". ESPN.; "Scout.com Team Recruiting Rankings". Scout.; "2016 Team Ranking". Rivals.com.

== Personnel ==
=== Roster ===
2016 Texas A&M Aggies football team roster
Players
Coaches
Offense

Pos.	#	Name	Class
WR	1	Quartney Davis	Fr
WR	2	Speedy Noil	Jr
WR	3	Christian Kirk	So
WR	4	Damion Ratley	Jr
RB	5	Trayveon Williams	Fr
RB	7	Keith Ford	Jr
QB	8	Trevor Knight	Sr
WR	9	Ricky Seals-Jones	Jr
QB	10	Jake Hubenak	Jr
WR	11	Josh Reynolds	Sr
WR	13	Jamal Jeffery	Jr
QB	13	Michael Milstead	Fr
QB	14	Conner McQueen	Sr
WR	15	Frank Iheanacho	So
QB	16	Hank Hughes	Fr
WR	16	Kemah Siverand	Fr
QB	17	Nick Starkel	Fr
WR	18	Edward Pope	Sr
QB	19	Gannon Rawlins	Fr
WR	19	Jeremy Tabuyo	Sr
RB	20	James White	Jr
WR	21	Aaron Hansford	Fr
RB	22	Kwame Etwi	So
TE	24	Jake Graham	Fr
RB	25	Kendall Bussey	Fr
WR	26	Kirk Merritt (I)	So
RB	27	John Clark	Fr
RB	28	AJ Sanders	Fr
RB	32	Rakeem Boyd	Fr
WR	33	Justice Bean	Fr
TE	41	Luke Laufenberg	Fr
WR	42	Josch Motley	Jr
RB	43	Kristian Chavis	Fr
WR	47	Samuel Phillips	Fr
OL	50	Tank Davis	So
OL	51	Riley Anderson	Fr
OL	55	Austin Anderson	Fr
OL	62	Chad Loitz	Jr
OL	63	Cagan Baldree	Fr
OL	64	Erik McCoy	Fr
OL	65	Avery Gennesy	Sr
OL	67	Drew Beakey	Fr
OL	68	Justin Dworaczyk	Fr
OL	69	Brayden Talbert	Fr
OL	70	Connor Lanfear	So
OL	71	Trevor Elbert	Fr
OL	72	Jermaine Eluemunor	Sr
OL	74	Kellen Diesch	Fr
OL	75	Koda Martin	So
OL	76	Colton Prater	Fr
OL	77	Ryan McCollum	Fr
OL	78	Keaton Sutherland	So
WR	80	Clyde Chriss	Fr
TE	81	Jalyn Judkins	Jr
WR	82	Boone Niederhofer	Sr
WR	83	Kyle Whitley	So
WR	84	Kendrick Rogers	Fr
TE	85	Grant Gustafson	Fr
TE	86	Tanner Schorp	Jr
TE	87	Greer Shetler	Fr
TE	88	Matthew Kirchner	Fr
TE	89	Kalvin Cline (I)	Jr

Defense

Pos.	#	Name	Class
DB	1	Nick Harvey	Jr
DB	4	Noel Ellis	Jr
DL	5	Daylon Mack	So
DB	6	Donovan Wilson	Jr
LB	7	Richard Moore	So
DB	8	Justin Dunning	So
DL	9	Qualen Cunningham	Jr
DL	10	Daeshon Hall	Sr
LB	11	Josh Walker	Jr
DL	13	Reggie Chevis	Jr
DB	14	Justin Evans	Sr
DL	15	Myles Garrett	Jr
LB	16	Dwaine Thomas	So
DB	17	Alex Sezer Jr.	Sr
DB	18	Larry Pryor	Fr
DB	19	DeShawn Capers-Smith	So
DB	20	Ikenna Okeke	Fr
DB	21	Charles Oliver	Fr
DB	22	Clifford Chattman	Fr
DB	23	Armani Watts	Jr
DB	24	Priest Willis	Jr
LB	25	Tyrel Dodson	Fr
DB	26	Victor Davis	Jr
DB	27	Roney Elam	Fr
DB	28	Travon Fuller	Fr
DB	30	Moses Reynolds	Fr
LB	31	Claude George	Sr
DB	32	Will Paulhill	Sr
LB	33	Shaan Washington	Sr
DB	34	Clayton Bantle	Fr
LB	35	Riley Garner	So
LB	38	Jordan Mastrogiovanni	Jr
DL	40	Jarrett Johnson	Jr
LB	42	Otaro Alaka	So
LB	45	Cullen Gillaspia	So
DL	46	Landis Durham	So
LB	50	Mac Labhart	So
DL	52	Justin Madubuike	Fr
LB	54	Jordan Driver	Fr
LB	56	Keeath Magee II	Fr
LB	58	Braden White	Fr
DL	86	David Darley	Jr
DL	88	Kingsley Keke	So
DL	90	TD Moton	Fr
DL	92	Zaycoven Henderson	Jr
DL	96	Jesse Brown (I)	So
DL	98	Hardreck Walker	Sr
DL	99	James Lockhart	So

Special teams

Pos.	#	Name	Class
PK	34	Braden Mann	Fr
PK/P	36	Daniel LaCamera	So
PK	38	Drew Riethman	Fr
DS	40	Christian Robertson	So
PK	41	Peter Grady	Jr
DS	45	Austin Frey	So
P	46	Shane Tripucka	Jr

Head coach

- Kevin Sumlin (5th season)

Coordinators/assistant coaches

- Jeff Banks – Special teams coordinator/tight ends
- John Chavis – Associate head coach/defensive coordinator/linebackers
- Matt Fontenot – Director of football operations
- Mikado Hinson – Director of player development
- Larry Jackson – Director of football sports performance
- Scott Johnston – Director of on-campus recruiting
- Terry Joseph – Secondary
- Noel Mazzone – Offensive coordinator
- Clarence McKinney – Running backs
- Aaron Moorehead – Wide receivers
- Dennis Polian – Director of player personnel
- Terry Price – Defensive ends
- Gary Reynolds – Associate Athletic Director - Football
- David Turner – Defensive tackles/defensive run-game coordinator
- Jim Turner – Offensive line
- Jeremy Springer – Special teams quality control

Legend

- (C) Team captain
- (S) Suspended
- (I) Ineligible
- Injured
- Redshirt

Roster
Last update: August 26, 2016

== Schedule ==
Texas A&M announced its 2016 football schedule on October 29, 2015. The 2016 schedule consists of 7 home games, 4 away games and 1 neutral site game in the regular season. The Aggies will host SEC foes LSU, Ole Miss, and Tennessee, and will travel to Alabama, Auburn, Mississippi State, and South Carolina. Texas A&M will go against Arkansas for the third time in a row in Arlington, Texas.

The Aggies will host all four of its non–conference games which are against New Mexico State Aggies from the Sun Belt Conference, Prairie View A&M Panthers from the Southwestern Athletic Conference, UCLA Bruins from the Pac-12 Conference and UTSA Roadrunners from Conference USA.

Date	Time	Opponent	Rank	Site	TV	Result	Attendance
September 3	2:30 pm	No. 16 UCLA*		Kyle Field; College Station, TX (SEC Nation)	CBS	W 31–24 ^{OT}	100,443
September 10	11:00 am	Prairie View A&M*	No. 20	Kyle Field; College Station, TX	SECN	W 67–0	96,412
September 17	6:00 pm	at Auburn	No. 17	Jordan–Hare Stadium; Auburn, AL	ESPN	W 29–16	87,175
September 24	8:00 pm	vs. No. 17 Arkansas	No. 10	AT&T Stadium; Arlington, TX (Southwest Classic)	ESPN	W 45–24	67,751
October 1	3:00 pm	at South Carolina	No. 9	Williams-Brice Stadium; Columbia, SC	SECN	W 24–13	78,245
October 8	2:30 pm	No. 9 Tennessee	No. 8	Kyle Field; College Station, TX (College GameDay)	CBS	W 45–38 ^{2OT}	106,248
October 22	2:30 pm	at No. 1 Alabama	No. 6	Bryant–Denny Stadium; Tuscaloosa, AL (College GameDay)	CBS	L 14–33	101,821
October 29	6:30 pm	New Mexico State*	No. 9	Kyle Field; College Station, TX	ESPNU	W 52–10	99,960
November 5	11:00 am	at Mississippi State	No. 4	Davis Wade Stadium; Starkville, MS	SECN	L 28–35	58,407
November 12	6:30 pm	Ole Miss	No. 8	Kyle Field; College Station, TX	SECN	L 28–29	104,892
November 19	11:00 am	UTSA*	No. 25	Kyle Field; College Station, TX	ESPNU	W 23–10	102,502
November 24	6:30 pm	LSU		Kyle Field; College Station, TX (rivalry)	ESPN	L 39–54	102,961
December 28	8:00 pm	vs. Kansas State*		NRG Stadium; Houston, TX (Texas Bowl)	ESPN	L 28–33	68,412
*Non-conference game; Rankings from AP Poll and CFP Rankings after November 1 released prior to game; All times are in Central time

Schedule source:

== Coaching staff ==
Name	Position	Season at Texas A&M
Kevin Sumlin	Head coach	5th
John Chavis	Associate head coach, defensive coordinator, and linebackers coach	2nd
Terry Joseph	Defensive backs coach	3rd
Terry Price	Defensive ends coach	5th
David Turner	Defensive run game coordinator and defensive tackles coach	1st
Noel Mazzone	Offensive coordinator and quarterbacks coach	1st
Clarence McKinney	Running backs coach	5th
Aaron Morehead	Wide receivers coach	2nd
Jim Turner	Offensive line coach	5th
Jeff Banks	Special teams coordinator and tight ends coach	4th
Larry Jackson	Director of football sports performance	5th
Jeremy Springer	Special teams quality control coach	2nd

== Game summaries ==
=== UCLA ===
Week One: #16 UCLA Bruins at Texas A&M Aggies – Game summary

Quarter	1	2	3	4	OT	Total
#16 Bruins	3	6	0	15	0	24
Aggies	0	10	14	0	7	31

at Kyle Field, College Station, TX

- Date: September 3
- Game time: 2:30 p.m.
- Game weather: Temperature: 88 °F (31 °C) • Wind: E 8 MPH • Weather: fair skies
- Game attendance: 100,443
- Referee: Land Clark
- TV announcers (CBS): Verne Lundquist, Gary Danielson, Allie LaForce

Game information

First quarter

- UCLA 11:38 – J.J. Molson 38 yard field goal, UCLA 3–0

Second quarter

- UCLA 11:33 – J.J. Molson 20 yard field goal, UCLA 6–0
- TAMU 7:26 – Keith Ford 70 yard run (Daniel LaCamera kick), TAMU 7–6
- UCLA 4:56 – J.J. Molson 23 yard field goal, UCLA 9–7
- TAMU 2:55 – Daniel LaCamera 23 yard field goal, TAMU 10–9

Third quarter

- TAMU 9:08 –[Trevor Knight 1 yard run (Daniel LaCamera kick), TAMU 17–9
- TAMU 3:53 – Josh Reynolds 40 yard pass from Trevor Knight (Daniel LaCamera kick), TAMU 24–9

Fourth quarter

- UCLA 4:19 – Bolu Olorunfunmi 9 yard run (J.J. Molson kick), TAMU 24–16
- UCLA 2:39 – Kenneth Walker III 62 yard pass from Josh Rosen (Josh Rosen pass to Austin Roberts), tied 24–24

Overtime

- TAMU – Trevor Knight 1 yard run (Daniel LaCamera kick), TAMU 31–24

Leading Passers

- UCLA – Josh Rosen 26/46, 343 yards, TD, 3 INTs
- TAMU – Trevor Knight 22/42, 239 yards, TD, INT

Leading Rushers

- UCLA – Soso Jamabo 23 carries, 91 yards
- TAMU – Trayveon Williams 15 carries, 95 yards

Leading Receivers

- UCLA – Kenneth Walker III 6 receptions, 115 yards, TD
- TAMU – Josh Reynolds 4 receptions, 78 yards, TD

The Texas A&M Aggies opened their 2016 season at home against the #16 UCLA Bruins. The Aggies dominated the Bruins in the first 3 quarters of the game, leading 24–9 at the start of the 4th quarter. UCLA started a comeback late in the 4th quarter with Bolu Olorunfunmi running 9 yards for a touchdown. With J.J. Molson making the extra point, the Bruins trailed 16–24 with 4:19 left in regulation. UCLA's defense forced the Aggies into a 3–and–out on the next possession. The Bruins' offense wasted no time scoring again, with Josh Rosen throwing 62 yards to Kenneth Walker III to trail 22–24. UCLA tied it up 24–24 with Rosen finding Austin Roberts for the two–point conversion with 2:39 left in regulation. A&M punted on their next possession, but gained the ball back after a Rosen pass was intercepted by Justin Evans at the A&M 47 yard line. The 4th quarter ended with the Aggies marching down to the UCLA 40 before turning it over on downs.

The Aggies received the ball first to start overtime and found the end zone with a 1 yard touchdown run from Trevor Knight. UCLA made it to the A&M 5, but failed to score on a 4th and goal, ending the game. Winning the game in overtime, the Texas A&M Aggies upset the #16 UCLA Bruins 31–24.

=== Prairie View A&M ===
Week Two: Prairie View A&M Panthers at #20 Texas A&M Aggies – Game summary

Quarter	1	2	3	4	Total
Panthers	0	0	0	0	0
#20 Aggies	17	21	13	16	67

at Kyle Field, College Station, TX

- Date: September 10
- Game time: 11:00 a.m.
- Game weather: Temperature: 80 °F (27 °C) • Wind: NW 20 MPH • Weather: cloudy
- Game attendance: 96,412
- Referee: David Smith
- TV announcers (SECN): Roy Philpott, Clint Stoerner, Kevin Weidl

Game information

First quarter

- TAMU 12:40 – Daniel LaCamera 22 yard field goal, TAMU 3–0
- TAMU 3:01 – Keith Ford 11 yard run (Daniel LaCamera kick), TAMU 10–0
- TAMU 0:00 – Trevor Knight 32 yard run (Daniel LaCamera kick), TAMU 17–0

Second quarter

- TAMU 12:12 – Speedy Noil 8 yard pass from Trevor Knight (Daniel LaCamera kick), TAMU 24–0
- TAMU 1:03 – Christian Kirk 34 yard pass from Trevor Knight (Daniel LaCamera kick), TAMU 31–0
- TAMU 0:33 – Christian Kirk 64 yard pass from Trevor Knight (Daniel LaCamera kick), TAMU 38–0

Third quarter

- TAMU 11:11 – Keith Ford 4 yard run (Daniel LaCamera kick), TAMU 45–0
- TAMU 8:26 – Daniel LaCamera 27 yard field goal, TAMU 48–0
- TAMU 4:27 – Daniel LaCamera 48 yard field goal, TAMU 51–0

Fourth quarter

- TAMU 14:30 – Nick Harvey 73 yard punt return (Daniel LaCamera kick), TAMU 58–0
- TAMU 2:32 – Kwame Etwi 15 yard run (Daniel LaCamera kick), TAMU 65–0
- TAMU 1:40 – Jalen Morton sacked by Jarret Johnson for a 4 yard loss, TAMU 67–0

Leading Passers

- PVAM – Trey Green 13/39, 160 yards, INT
- TAMU – Trevor Knight 21/37, 344 yards, 3 TDs, INT

Leading Rushers

- PVAM – Darius Floyd 10 carries, 28 yards
- TAMU – Kendall Bussey 7 carries, 79 yards

Leading Receivers

- PVAM – Demarquo Lastrappe 6 receptions, 88 yards
- TAMU – Christian Kirk 5 receptions, 106 yards, 2 TDs

After the upset the week before against the #16 UCLA Bruins, the #20 Texas A&M Aggies hosted the FCS Prairie View A&M Panthers from the SWAC. The Aggies' defense held the Panthers scoreless, only allowed 10 first downs, 205 total yards of offense, and forcing a safety. A&M's special teams were also a highlight, with Justin Evans blocking a 38 yard field goal in the 1st quarter and Nick Harvey returning a punt 73 yards for a touchdown in the 4th. The only highlights for the Panthers was Raleigh Johnson intercepting a Trevor Knight pass in the end zone in the 2nd quarter and Johnson forcing a fumble that was recovered by Reginald Stubblefield late in the 4th.

=== Auburn ===
Week Three: #17 Texas A&M Aggies at Auburn Tigers – Game summary

Quarter	1	2	3	4	Total
#17 Aggies	3	13	3	10	29
Tigers	7	3	0	6	16

at Jordan–Hare Stadium, Auburn, AL

- Date: September 17
- Game time: 6:00 p.m.
- Game weather: Temperature: 81 °F (27 °C) • Wind: SW 2 MPH • Weather: cloudy
- Game attendance: 87,175
- Referee: Matt Austin
- TV announcers (ESPN): Dave Flemming, Brian Griese, Todd McShay

Game information

First quarter

- AUB 7:11 – Kamryn Pettway 1 yard run (Daniel Carlson kick), AUB 7–0
- TAMU 1:42 – Daniel LaCamera 46 yard field goal, AUB 7–3

Second quarter

- TAMU 12:07 – Josh Reynolds 5 yard pass from Trevor Knight (Daniel LaCamera kick), TAMU 10–7
- TAMU 5:38 – Daniel LaCamera 35 yard field goal, TAMU 13–7
- TAMU 1:52 – Daniel LaCamera 31 yard field goal, TAMU 16–7
- AUB 0:00 – Daniel Carlson 37 yard field goal, TAMU 16–10

Third quarter

- TAMU 1:03 – Daniel LaCamera 25 yard field goal, TAMU 19–10

Fourth quarter

- TAMU 10:13 – Daniel LaCamera 26 yard field goal, TAMU 22–10
- TAMU 6:52 – Trayveon Williams 89 yard run (Daniel LaCamera kick), TAMU 29–10
- AUB 2:59 – Kerryon Johnson 2 yard run, TAMU 29–16

Leading Passers

- TAMU – Trevor Knight 20/40, 247 yards, TD
- AUB – Sean White 18/27, 126 yards

Leading Rushers

- TAMU – Trayveon Williams 8 carries, 127 yards, TD
- AUB – Kamryn Pettway 20 carries, 123 yards, TD

Leading Receivers

- TAMU – Josh Reynolds 7 receptions, 98 yards, TD
- AUB – Tony Stevens 8 receptions, 86 yards

The Aggies opened 2016 conference play on the road against the Auburn Tigers. Texas A&M kicker Daniel LaCamera made 5 goals during the game while quarterback Trevor Knight didn't throw an interception during the game, the first game of the season where he didn't throw a pick.

=== Arkansas ===
Week Four: #17 Arkansas Razorbacks vs. #10 Texas A&M Aggies (Southwest Classic) – Game summary

Quarter	1	2	3	4	Total
#17 Razorbacks	7	10	0	7	24
#10 Aggies	0	17	7	21	45

at AT&T Stadium, Arlington, TX

- Date: September 24
- Game time: 8:00 p.m.
- Game weather: N/A (Game played indoors)
- Game attendance: 67,751
- Referee: James Carter
- TV announcers (ESPN): Joe Tessitore, Todd Blackledge, Holly Rowe

Game information

First quarter

- ARK 12:29 – Keon Hatcher 15 yard pass from Austin Allen (Cole Hedlund kick), ARK 7–0

Second quarter

- TAMU 14:52 – Trevor Knight 42 yard run (Daniel LaCamera kick), tied 7–7
- ARK 9:59 – Cole Hedlund 25 yard field goal, ARK 10–7
- TAMU 4:42 – Daniel LaCamera 48 yard field goal, tied 10–10
- ARK 1:31 – Rawleigh Williams III 8 yard run (Cole Hedlund kick), ARK 17–10
- TAMU 0:13 – Trevor Knight 48 yard run (Daniel LaCamera kick), tied 17–17

Third quarter

- TAMU 1:33 – Josh Reynolds 92 yard pass from Trevor Knight (Daniel LaCamera kick), TAMU 24–17

Fourth quarter

- TAMU 11:54 – Trayveon Williams 33 yard run (Daniel LaCamera kick), TAMU 31–17
- TAMU 10:25 – Christian Kirk 9 yard pass from Trevor Knight (Daniel LaCamera kick), TAMU 38–17
- ARK 6:21 – Jared Cornelius 5 yard pass from Austin Allen (Cole Hedlund kick), TAMU 38–24
- TAMU 4:57 – Trayveon Williams 22 yard run (Daniel LaCamera kick), TAMU 45–24

Leading Passers

- ARK – Austin Allen 28/42, 371 yards, 2 TDs
- TAMU – Trevor Knight 12/22, 225 yards, 2 TDs

Leading Rushers

- ARK – Rawleigh Williams III 17 carries, 79 yards, TD
- TAMU – Trevor Knight 10 carries, 157 yards, 2 TDs

Leading Receivers

- ARK – Jared Cornelius 7 receptions, 126 yards, TD
- TAMU – Josh Reynolds 4 receptions, 141 yards, TD

=== South Carolina ===
Week Five: #9 Texas A&M Aggies at South Carolina Gamecocks – Game summary

Quarter	1	2	3	4	Total
#9 Aggies	7	0	7	10	24
Gamecocks	7	0	3	3	13

at Williams-Brice Stadium, Columbia, SC

- Date: October 1
- Game time: 3:00 p.m.
- Game attendance: 78,245
- TV: SECN

Game information

First quarter

- SCU 14:47 – A.J. Turner 75 yard run (Eliiot Fry kick), SCU 7–0
- TAMU 12:31 – Trevor Knight 4 yard run (Daniel LaCamera kick), tied 7–7

Second quarter

- No scoring plays

Third quarter

- TAMU 11:37 – Trayveon Williams 49 yard run (Daniel LaCamera kick), TAMU 14–7
- SCU 3:14 – Elliot Fry 43 yard field goal, TAMU 14–10

Fourth quarter

- TAMU 11:40 – James White 2 yard run (Daniel LaCamera kick), TAMU 21–10
- SCU 4:23 – Elliot Fry 43 yard field goal, TAMU 21–13
- TAMU 1:41 – Daniel LaCamera 35 yard field goal, TAMU 24–13

Leading Passers

- TAMU – Trevor Knight 23/40, 206 yards, INT
- SCU – Perry Orth 11/18, 138 yards

Leading Rushers

- TAMU – Trayveon Williams 14 carries, 98 yards, TD
- SCU – A.J. Turner 10 carries, 113 yards, TD

Leading Receivers

- TAMU – Jeremy Tabuyo 4 receptions, 89 yards
- SCU – Hayden Hurst 5 receptions, 90 yards

=== Tennessee ===
Week Six: #9 Tennessee Volunteers at #8 Texas A&M Aggies – Game summary

Quarter	1	2	3	4	OT	2OT	Total
#9 Volunteers	7	0	7	21	3	0	38
#8 Aggies	21	0	7	7	3	7	45

at Kyle Field, College Station, TX

- Date: October 8
- Game time: 2:30 p.m.
- Game weather: Temperature: 82 °F (28 °C), Wind: N 11 MPH, Weather: sunny
- Game attendance: 106,248
- TV announcers (CBS): Verne Lundquist, Gary Danielson, Allie LaForce

Game information

First quarter

- TAMU 8:30 – Christian Kirk 13 yard pass from Trevor Knight (Daniel LaCamera kick), TAMU 7–0
- TENN 3:37 – Joshua Dobbs 4 yard pass from Jauan Jennings (Aaron Medley kick), tied 7–7
- TAMU 2:04 – Josh Reynolds 2 yard pass from Trevor Knight (Daniel LaCamera kick), TAMU 14–7
- TAMU 1:45 – Trevor Knight 7 yard run (Daniel LaCamera kick), TAMU 21–7

Second quarter

- No scoring plays

Third quarter

- TAMU 10:40 – Trayveon Williams 7 yard run (Daniel LaCamera kick), TAMU 28–7
- TENN 7:10 – Alvin Kamara 15 yard run (Aaron Medley kick), TAMU 28–14

Fourth quarter

- TENN 7:06 – John Kelly 4 yard run (Aaron Medley kick), TAMU 28–21
- TAMU 3:22 – Trevor Knight 62 yard run (Daniel LaCamera kick), TAMU 35–21
- TENN 2:02 – Alvin Kamara 4 yard run (Daniel Medley kick), TAMU 35–28
- TENN 0:41 – Alvin Kamara 18 yard pass from Joshua Dobbs (Daniel Medley kick), tied 35–35

Overtime

- TENN – Aaron Medley 34 yard field goal, TENN 38–35
- TAMU – Daniel LaCamera 34 yard field goal, tied 38–38

Second overtime

- TAMU – Trevor Knight 1 yard run (Daniel LaCamera kick), TAMU 45–38

Leading Passers

- TENN – Joshua Dobbs 28/47, 398 yards, TD, 2 INT
- TAMU – Trevor Knight 17/34, 239 yards, 2 TD, 2 INT

Leading Rushers

- TENN – Alvin Kamara 18 carries, 127 yards, 2 TD
- TAMU – Trayveon Williams 28 carries, 217 yards, TD

Leading Receivers

- TENN – Alvin Kamara 8 receptions, 161 yards, TD
- TAMU – Josh Reynolds 5 receptions, 89 yards, TD

=== Alabama ===
Week Eight: #6 Texas A&M Aggies at #1 Alabama Crimson Tide – Game summary

Quarter	1	2	3	4	Total
#6 Aggies	0	7	7	0	14
#1 Crimson Tide	6	7	13	7	33

at Bryant–Denny Stadium, Tuscaloosa, AL

- Date: October 22
- Game time: 2:30 p.m.
- Game weather: Clear & Sunny • Temperature: 71 °F (22 °C) • Wind: N 10 mph
- Game attendance: 101,821
- Referee: John McDaid
- TV announcers (CBS): Verne Lundquist, Gary Danielson, Allie LaForce

Game information

First quarter

- ALA 12:22 – Adam Griffith 32 yard field goal, ALA 3–0
- ALA 4:48 – Adam Griffith 28 yard field goal, ALA 6–0

Second quarter

- ALA 12:59 – O. J. Howard 5 yard pass from Jalen Hurts (Adam Griffith kick), ALA 13–0
- TAMU 0:38 – Josh Reynolds 9 yard pass from Trevor Knight (Daniel LaCamera kick), ALA 13–7

Third quarter

- TAMU 12:54 – Christian Kirk 25 yard pass from Trevor Knight (Daniel LaCamera kick), TAMU 14–13
- ALA 6:33 – Calvin Ridley 4 yard pass from Jalen Hurts (Adam Griffith kick), ALA 20–14
- ALA 0:23 – Jonathan Allen 30 yard fumble recovery (two-point conversion failed), ALA 26–14

Fourth quarter

- ALA 12:27 – Jalen Hurts 37 yard run (Adam Griffith kick), ALA 33–14

Leading Passers

- TAMU – Trevor Knight 14/31, 164 yards, 2 TD, INT
- ALA – Jalen Hurts 15/25, 164 yards, 2 TD, 2 INT

Leading Rushers

- TAMU – Keith Ford 15 carries, 62 yards
- ALA – Damien Harris 17 carries, 128 yards

Leading Receivers

- TAMU – Christian Kirk 9 receptions, 58 yards, TD
- ALA – O. J. Howard 8 receptions, 69 yards, TD

=== New Mexico State ===
Week Nine: New Mexico State Aggies at #9 Texas A&M Aggies – Game summary

Quarter	1	2	3	4	Total
NMSU Aggies	0	3	0	7	10
#9 TAMU Aggies	14	10	21	7	52

at Kyle Field, College Station, TX

- Date: October 29
- Game time: 6:30 p.m.
- Game attendance: 99,960
- TV: ESPNU

Game information

First quarter

- TAMU 11:42 – Trayveon Williams 12 yard run (Daniel LaCamera kick), TAMU 7–0
- TAMU 9:38 – Christian Kirk 70 yard punt return (Daniel LaCamera kick), TAMU 14–0

Second quarter

- TAMU 14:44 – Daniel LaCamera 36 yard field goal, TAMU 17–0
- TAMU 3:42 – Christian Kirk 3 yard pass from Trevor Knight (Daniel LaCamera kick), TAMU 24–0
- NMSU 1:05 – Parker Davidson 33 yard field goal, TAMU 24–3

Third quarter

- TAMU 14:18 – Josh Reynolds 41 yard pass from Trevor Knight (Daniel LaCamera kick), TAMU 31–3
- TAMU 12:27 – Christian Kirk 71 yard punt return (Daniel LaCamera kick), TAMU 38–3
- TAMU 1:50 – James White 1 yard run (Daniel LaCamera kick), TAMU 45–3

Fourth quarter

- NMSU 14:04 – Jaleel Scott 3 yard pass from Tyler Rogers (Parker Davidson kick), TAMU 45–10
- TAMU 10:11 – Kalvin Kline 17 yard pass from Jake Hubenak (Daniel LaCamera kick), TAMU 52–10

Leading Passers

- NMSU – Tyler Rogers 19/34, 138 yards, TD
- TAMU – Trevor Knight 15/24, 204 yards, 2 TD

Leading Rushers

- NMSU – Larry Rose III 14 carries, 89 yards
- TAMU – Kendall Bussey 10 carries, 87 yards

Leading Receivers

- NMSU – Anthony Muse 5 receptions, 41 yards
- TAMU – Josh Reynolds 3 receptions, 71 yards, TD

=== Mississippi State ===
Week Ten: #7 Texas A&M Aggies at Mississippi State Bulldogs – Game summary

Quarter	1	2	3	4	Total
#7 Aggies	7	7	0	14	28
Bulldogs	14	14	0	7	35

at Davis Wade Stadium, Starkville, MS

- Date: November 5
- Game time: 11:00 a.m.
- Game attendance: 58,407
- TV: SECN

Game information

First quarter

- MSU 12:18 – Nick Fitzgerald 74 yard run (Westin Graves kick), MSU 7–0
- MSU 4:36 – Aeris Williams 2 yard run (Westin Graves kick), MSU 14–0
- TAMU 0:03 – Trevor Knight 19 yard run (Daniel LaCamera kick), MSU 14–7

Second quarter

- MSU 10:53 – Fred Ross 60 yard pass from Nick Fitzgerald (Westin Graves kick), MSU 21–7
- MSU 3:54 – Fred Ross 7 yard pass from Nick Fitzgerald (Westin Graves kick), MSU 28–7
- TAMU 0:19 – Christian Kirk 93 yard punt return (Daniel LaCamera kick), MSU 28–14

Third quarter

- No scoring plays

Fourth quarter

- TAMU 10:42 – Christian Kirk 54 yard pass from Jake Hubenak (Daniel LaCamera kick), MSU 28–21
- MSU 3:08 – Nick Fitzgerald 4 yard run (Westin Graves kick), MSU 35–21
- TAMU 1:33 – Josh Reynolds 4 yard pass from Jake Hubenak (Daneil LaCamera kick), MSU 35–28

Leading Passers

- TAMU – Jake Hubenak 11/17, 222 yards, 2 TD, INT
- MSU – Nick Fitzgerald 18/31, 209 yards, 2 TD, INT

Leading Rushers

- TAMU – Trevor Knight 5 carries, 54 yards, TD
- MSU – Nick Fitzgerald 20 carries, 182 yards, 2 TD

Leading Receivers

- TAMU – Christian Kirk 7 receptions, 144 yards, TD
- MSU – Fred Ross 6 receptions, 98 yards, 2 TD

=== Ole Miss ===
Week Eleven: Ole Miss Rebels at #10 Texas A&M Aggies – Game summary

Quarter	1	2	3	4	Total
Rebels	3	3	0	23	29
#10 Aggies	7	14	0	7	28

at Kyle Field, College Station, TX

- Date: November 12
- Game time: 6:30 p.m.
- Game weather: Partly Cloudy • Temperature: 70 °F (21 °C)
- Game attendance: 104,892
- Referee: Matt Austin
- TV announcers (SECN): Brent Musburger, Jesse Palmer, Kaylee Hartung

Game information

First quarter

- MISS 5:23 – Gary Wunderlich 25 yard field goal, MISS 3–0
- TAMU 4:49 – Keith Ford 6 yard run (Daniel LaCamera kick), TAMU 7–3

Second quarter

- TAMU 13:55 – Keith Ford 1 yard run (Daniel LaCamera kick), TAMU 14–3
- MISS 7:46 – Gary Wunderlich 24 yard field goal, TAMU 14–6
- TAMU 6:43 – Speedy Noil 1 yard pass from Jake Hubenak (Daniel LaCamera kick), TAMU 21–6

Third quarter

- No scoring plays

Fourth quarter

- MISS 14:50 – Damore'ea Stringfellow 6 yard pass from Shea Patterson (Gary Wunderlich kick), TAMU 21–13
- MISS 12:12 – Akeem Judd 21 yard run (two–point conversion failed), TAMU 21–19
- TAMU 6:41 – Josh Reynolds 13 yard pass from Jake Hubenak (Daniel LaCamera kick), TAMU 28–19
- MISS 5:17 – Van Jefferson 32 yard pass from Shea Patterson (Gary Wunderlich kick), TAMU 28–26
- MISS 0:37 – Gary Wunderlich 39 yard field goal, MISS 29–28

Leading Passers

- MISS – Shea Patterson 25/42, 338 yards, 2 TD, INT
- TAMU – Jake Hubenak 16/27, 213 yards, 2 TD, INT

Leading Rushers

- MISS – Akeem Judd 20 carries, 100 yards, TD
- TAMU – Trayveon Williams 17 carries, 72 yards

Leading Receivers

- MISS – A. J. Brown 4 receptions, 77 yards
- TAMU – Josh Reynolds 4 receptions, 70 yards, TD

=== UTSA ===
Week Twelve: UTSA Roadrunners at #23 Texas A&M Aggies – Game summary

Quarter	1	2	3	4	Total
Roadrunners	0	7	3	0	10
#23 Aggies	10	6	7	0	23

at Kyle Field, College Station, TX

- Date: November 19
- Game time: 11:00 a.m.
- TV: ESPNU

Game information

First quarter

- TAMU 10:30 – Josh Reynolds 16 yard pass from Jake Hubenak (Daniel LaCamera kick), TAMU 7–0
- TAMU 1:22 – Daniel LaCamera 24 yard field goal, TAMU 10–0

Second quarter

- UTSA 10:46 – Josh Stewart 10 yard pass from Jared Johnson (Victor Falcon kick), TAMU 10–7
- TAMU 5:22 – Daniel LaCamera 33 yard field goal, TAMU 13–7
- TAMU 0:00 – Daniel LaCamera 37 yard field goal, TAMU 16–7

Third quarter

- TAMU 8:22 – Trayveon Williams 47 yard run (Daniel LaCamera kick), TAMU 23–7
- UTSA 2:17 – Victor Falcon 24 yard field goal, TAMU 23–10

Fourth quarter

- No scoring plays

Leading Passers

- UTSA – Jared Johnson 15/24, 186 yards, TD
- TAMU – Jake Hubenak 19/32, 248 yards, TD

Leading Rushers

- UTSA – Jarveon Williams 21 carries, 52 yards
- TAMU – Trayveon Williams 11 carries, 80 yards, TD

Leading Receivers

- UTSA – Josh Stewart 6 receptions, 75 yards, TD
- TAMU – Josh Reynolds 7 receptions, 93 yards, TD

=== LSU ===
Week Thirteen: LSU Tigers at Texas A&M Aggies – Game summary

Quarter	1	2	3	4	Total
#25 Tigers	10	10	14	20	54
#22 Aggies	7	0	10	22	39

at Kyle Field, College Station, TX

- Date: November 24
- Game time: 6:30 p.m.
- TV: ESPN

Game information

First quarter

- LSU 13:16 – Derrius Guice 45 yard run (Colby Delahoussaye kick), LSU 7–0
- TAMU 6:05 – Christian Kirk 36 yard pass from Trevor Knight (Daniel LaCamera kick), tied 7–7
- LSU 2:11 – Colby Delahoussaye 23 yard field goal, LSU 10–7

Second quarter

- LSU 11:02 – Colby Delahoussaye 32 yard field goal, LSU 13–7
- LSU 0:32 – Malachi Dupre 20 yard pass from Danny Etling (Colby Delahoussaye kick), LSU 20–7

Third quarter

- TAMU 13:19 – Daniel LaCamera 49 yard field goal, LSU 20–10
- LSU 11:11 – Derrius Guice 45 yard run (Colby Delahoussaye kick), LSU 27–10
- LSU 7:45 – Derrius Guice 6 yard run (Colby Delahoussaye kick), LSU 34–10
- TAMU 5:04 – Trayveon Williams 33 yard run (Daniel LaCamera kick), LSU 34–17

Fourth quarter

- LSU 14:55 – D. J. Chark 7 yard run (Colby Delahoussaye kick), LSU 41–17
- TAMU 13:07 – Christian Kirk 43 yard pass from Trevor Knight (Trevor Knight pass to Speedy Noil), LSU 41–25
- LSU 10:03 – Russel Gage 9 yard pass from Danny Etling (two-point conversion failed), LSU 47–25
- TAMU 8:45 – Josh Reynolds 32 yard pass from Trevor Knight (Keith Ford run), LSU 47–33
- LSU 4:59 – Derrius Guice 2 yard run (Colby Delahoussaye kick), LSU 54–33
- TAMU 0:15 – James White 2 yard run (two-point conversion failed), LSU 54–39

Leading Passers

- LSU – Danny Etling 20/28, 324 yards, 2 TD
- TAMU – Trevor Knight 14/30, 211 yards, 3 TD

Leading Rushers

- LSU – Derrius Guice 37 carries, 285 yards, 4 TD
- TAMU – Keith Ford 15 carries, 100 yards

Leading Receivers

- LSU – Russell Gage 5 receptions, 62 yards, TD
- TAMU – Christian Kirk 8 receptions, 107 yards, 2 TD

=== Kansas State (Advocare V100 Texas Bowl) ===
Bowl Week: Kansas State Wildcats vs. Texas A&M Aggies – Game summary

Quarter	1	2	3	4	Total
Aggies	7	7	7	7	28
Wildcats	7	16	3	7	33

at NRG Stadium, Houston, TX

- Date: December 28
- Game time: 8:00 p.m.
- Game attendance: 68,412
- TV: ESPN

Game information

First quarter

- TAMU 11:30 – Keith Ford 7 yard run (Daniel LaCamera kick), TAMU 7–0
- KSU 4:52 – Byron Pringle 79 yard pass from Jesse Ertz (Ian Patterson kick), tied 7–7

Second quarter

- KSU 12:19 – Jesse Ertz 5 yard run (Ian Patterson PAT blocked), KSU 13–7
- TAMU 10:00 – Ricky-Seals Jones 3 yard pass from Trevor Knight (Daniel LaCamera kick), TAMU 14–13
- KSU 6:13 – Ian Patterson 40 yard field goal, KSU 16–14
- KSU 3:07 – Dominique Heath 52 yard run (Ian Patterson kick), KSU 23–14

Third quarter

- TAMU 6:55 – Josh Reynolds 4 yard pass from Trevor Knight (Daniel LaCamera kick), KSU 23–21
- KSU 2:48 – Ian Patterson 25 yard field goal, KSU 26–21

Fourth quarter

- KSU 9:00 – Jesse Ertz 1 yard run (Ian Patterson kick), KSU 33–21
- TAMU 7:50 – Josh Reynolds 15 yard pass from Trevor Knight (Daniel LaCamera kick), KSU 33–28

Leading Passers

- KSU – Jesse Ertz 14/20, 195 yards, TD
- TAMU – Trevor Knight 30/48, 310 yards, 3 TD, INT

Leading Rushers

- KSU – Justin Silmon 10 carries, 77 yards
- TAMU – Keith Ford 10 carries, 86 yards, TD

Leading Receivers

- KSU – Byron Pringle 3 receptions, 107 yards, TD
- TAMU – Josh Reynolds 12 receptions, 154 yards, 2 TD

== Rankings ==
Ranking movements Legend: ██ Increase in ranking ██ Decrease in ranking — = Not ranked RV = Received votes
	Week															
Poll	Pre	1	2	3	4	5	6	7	8	9	10	11	12	13	14	Final
AP	RV	20	17	10	9	8	6	6	9	7	10	23	22	RV	RV	—
Coaches	RV	24	20	13	10	7	6	6	10	7	11	22	22	RV	RV	—
CFP	Not released									4	8	25	—	—	—	Not released

13
