= 2016 All-Big 12 Conference football team =

The 2016 All-Big 12 Conference football team consists of American football players chosen as All-Big 12 Conference players for the 2016 Big 12 Conference football season. The conference recognizes two official All-Big 12 selectors: (1) the Big 12 conference coaches selected separate offensive and defensive units and named first- and second-team players (the "Coaches" team); and (2) a panel of sports writers and broadcasters covering the Big 12 also selected offensive and defensive units and named first- and second-team players (the "Media" team).

== Offensive selections ==
=== Quarterbacks ===
- Baker Mayfield, Oklahoma (Coaches-1; Media-1)
- Patrick Mahomes II, Texas Tech (Coaches-2; Media-2)

=== Running backs ===
- D'Onta Foreman, Texas (Coaches-1; Media-1)
- Joe Mixon, Oklahoma (Coaches-1; Media-1)
- Samaje Perine, Oklahoma (Coaches-2; Media-2)
- Justin Crawford, West Virginia (Media-2)
- Justice Hill, Oklahoma State (Coaches-2)

=== Fullbacks ===
- Winston Dimel, Kansas State (Coaches-1)
- Dimitri Flowers, Oklahoma (Coaches-2)

=== Centers ===
- Tyler Orlosky, West Virginia (Coaches-1; Media-1)
- Kyle Fuller, Baylor (Coaches-1; Media-2)
- Austin Schlottmann, TCU (Coaches-2)

=== Guards ===
- Terrale Johnson, Kansas State (Media-1)
- Kyle Bosch, West Virginia (Media-1)
- Ben Powers, Oklahoma (Media-2)
- Adam Pankey, West Virginia (Media-2)
- Kent Perkins, Texas (Coaches-2)

=== Tackles ===
- Connor Williams, Texas (Coaches-1; Media-1)
- Orlando Brown, Oklahoma (Coaches-1; Media-1)
- Dalton Risner, Kansas State (Coaches-1; Media-2)
- Victor Salako, Oklahoma State (Coaches-2; Media-2)
- Nick Fett, Iowa State (Coaches-2)
- Zach Crabtree, Oklahoma State (Coaches-2)

=== Tight ends ===
- Mark Andrews, Oklahoma (Coaches-1; Media-1)
- Blake Jarwin, Oklahoma State (Coaches-2; Media-2)

=== Receivers ===
- Dede Westbrook, Oklahoma (Coaches-1; Media-1)
- James Washington, Oklahoma State (Coaches-1; Media-1)
- K. D. Cannon, Baylor (Coaches-1; Media-2)
- Allen Lazard, Iowa State (Coaches-1)
- Jonathan Giles, Texas Tech (Coaches-2; Media-2)
- Shelton Gibson, West Virginia (Coaches-2)
- Daikiel Shorts Jr., West Virginia (Coaches-2)

== Defensive selections ==
=== Defensive linemen ===
- Jordan Willis, Kansas State (Coaches-1; Media-1)
- Dorance Armstrong Jr., Kansas (Coaches-1; Media-1)
- Vincent Taylor, Oklahoma State (Media-1; Coaches-1)
- Will Geary, Kansas State (Media-1)
- K. J. Smith, Baylor (Coaches-1)
- Josh Carraway, TCU (Coaches-1; Media-2)
- Jhaustin Thomas, Iowa State (Coaches-2)
- Demond Tucker, Iowa State (Coaches-2)
- Jordan Wade, Oklahoma (Coaches-2)
- Aaron Curry, TCU (Coaches-2; Media-2)
- Breckyn Hager, Texas (Coaches-2; Media-2)
- Daniel Wise, Kansas (Media-2)

=== Linebackers ===
- Elijah Lee, Kansas State (Coaches-1; Media-1)
- Jordan Evans, Oklahoma (Coaches-1; Media-1)
- Travin Howard, TCU (Coaches-1; Media-1)
- Ogbonnia Okoronkwo, Oklahoma (Coaches-2; Media-2)
- Chad Whitener, Oklahoma State (Coaches-2)
- Ty Summers, TCU (Coaches-2)
- Devante Averette, Oklahoma St (Media-2)
- Malik Jefferson, Texas (Media-2)

=== Defensive backs ===
- Rasul Douglas, West Virginia (Coaches-1; Media-1)
- Jordan Thomas, Oklahoma (Coaches-1; Media-1)
- Jordan Sterns, Oklahoma State (Coaches-1; Media-1)
- D. J. Reed, Kansas State (Coaches-1; Media-2)
- Fish Smithson, Kansas (Coaches-1; Media-2)
- Denzel Johnson, TCU (Coaches-2; Media-2)
- Orion Stewart, Baylor (Media-1)
- Patrick Levels, Baylor (Coaches-2)
- Kamari Cotton-Moya, Iowa State (Coaches-2)
- Tre Flowers, Oklahoma State (Coaches-2)
- Nick Orr, TCU (Coaches-2)
- Ranthony Texada, TCU (Media-2)

== Special teams ==
=== Kickers ===
- Cole Netten, Iowa State (Coaches-1; Media-1)
- Ben Grogan, Oklahoma State (Coaches-2; Media-2)

=== Punters ===
- Michael Dickson, Texas (Coaches-1; Media-1)
- Zach Sinor, Oklahoma State (Coaches-2; Media-2)

=== All-purpose / Return specialists ===
- Shelton Gibson, West Virginia (Media-1)
- Byron Pringle, Kansas State (Coaches-1)
- Joe Mixon, Oklahoma (Media-2)
- Dede Westbrook, Oklahoma (Coaches-2)

== Key ==
Bold = selected as a first-team player by both the coaches and media panel

Coaches = selected by Big 12 Conference coaches

Media = selected by a media panel

== See also ==
- 2016 College Football All-America Team
