= Elijah Lee =

American football player (born 1996)

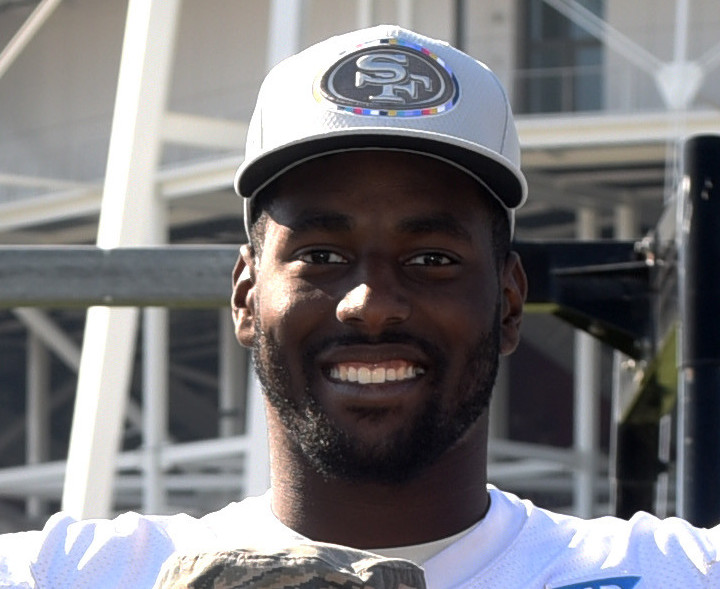
- Lee with the San Francisco 49ers in 2018

No. 47, 55, 52, 44
- Position: Linebacker

Personal information
- Born: February 8, 1996 (age 30); St Joseph, Missouri, U.S.
- Listed height: 6 ft 2 in (1.88 m)
- Listed weight: 229 lb (104 kg)

Career information
- High school: Blue Springs (Blue Springs, Missouri)
- College: Kansas State (2014–2016)
- NFL draft: 2017: 7th round, 232nd overall pick

Career history
- Minnesota Vikings (2017)*; San Francisco 49ers (2017–2019); Detroit Lions (2020); Cleveland Browns (2020–2021); Kansas City Chiefs (2022); Chicago Bears (2022); St. Louis Battlehawks (2024)
- * Offseason or practice squad member only

Awards and highlights
- First-team All-Big 12 (2016); Second-team All-Big 12 (2015)

Career NFL statistics
- Total tackles: 107
- Sacks: 1.0
- Forced fumbles: 2
- Fumble recoveries: 2
- Pass deflections: 2
- Stats at Pro Football Reference

Elijah James Lee (born February 8, 1996) is an American former professional football player who was a linebacker in the National Football League (NFL). He played college football for the Kansas State Wildcats, and was selected by the Minnesota Vikings in the seventh round in the 2017 NFL draft.

== Early life ==
Lee attended Blue Springs High School, where he played football under head coach Kelly Donohoe. He was a teammate of Kansas State running back Dalvin Warmack. During his high school career, Lee was a two-time Kansas City Star All-Metro honoree and was a two-time recipient of the Buck Buchanan Memorial Award, given to the best lineman or linebacker in the top two high school classes in Kansas or Missouri high school football in the Kansas City area, being only the second two-time winner of the award. Lee was named to the MaxPreps Junior All-American team as a junior in 2012 after collecting 71 tackles, 33.5 tackles for loss and 18.5 sacks. He was also a first-team All-State honoree by both the coaches and media. As a senior in 2013, Lee recorded 85 tackles, including 36 for loss and 12 sacks. He was selected as the Missouri Football Coaches' Association (MFCA) Class 6 Defensive Player of the Year, while he was a unanimous pick for the MFCA All-State squad. He was also named first-team All-State by the Missouri media and was selected to the USA Today All-USA Missouri Team. Lee also participated in basketball, earning all-conference and all-district honors, and track and field at Blue Springs.

Lee was regarded as a three-star recruit by Rivals.com and was rated the 39th-best outside linebacker nationally by Scout.com and 41st by Rivals. Lee committed to Kansas State on March 26, 2013. He also had scholarship offers from Iowa and Nebraska, among others.

== College career ==
Lee made the transition from defensive end in high school to outside linebacker at Kansas State. A three-year letter winner, Lee became the first Wildcat linebacker to earn consecutive All-Big 12 Conference honors since Arthur Brown in 2011 and 2012. Lee finished his collegiate career with 209 total tackles (153 solo), 18.5 tackles for loss, 11 sacks, 5 forced fumbles and five interceptions (the most by a Wildcat linebacker under head coach Bill Snyder). He is also tied for fourth in Kansas State bowl history with 20 career tackles. During his time at Kansas State, the Wildcats had a 24–15 record and three bowl berths.

As a freshman in 2014, Lee played in all 13 games and totaled 19 tackles, including 4.5 sacks, a forced fumble and a pass breakup. His 4.5 sacks were the most sacks by a true freshman in school history and the second-most among all freshmen (true and redshirt), and also the most among all true freshmen in the Big 12 in 2014. He started the season off with two sacks against Stephen F. Austin, becoming the first true freshman under head coach Bill Snyder to record two sacks in a game. Against UTEP in week 4, he registered a season-high four tackles. He recorded sacks against Texas and Kansas, and a half sack at Iowa State.

Lee started all 13 games as a sophomore in 2015, leading the team with 80 tackles en route to second-team All-Big 12 honors from the league's coaches, becoming Kansas State's first underclassman linebacker to earn either first or second-team All-Big 12 honors since College Football Hall of Famer Mark Simoneau back in 1998. He was also the first Wildcat underclassman to lead the team in tackles since 2008. He finished second on the team with 7.5 tackles for loss and third with 5.0 sacks, and recorded three interceptions, the most by a linebacker since 2002. Two of his picks came against TCU on in week 5, and were the most in a game by a Wildcat linebacker since 2002. In the game against Louisiana Tech, he set career highs in tackles with 12, tackles for loss with 3.0 and sacks with a pair. He also reached double digits in tackles against Texas Tech with 11 (including a 14-yard sack). Lee also earned second-team Academic All-Big 12 honors.

In 2016, Lee led the team in tackles as a junior with 110, while adding 6.5 tackles for loss, 1.5 sacks and two interceptions en route to first-team All-Big 12 honors from the league's coaches, Associated Press (AP), ESPN.com and Phil Steele. He also earned second-team honors from Pro Football Focus (PFF), while he received votes for Big 12 Defensive Player of the Year. His 110 total tackles ranked third in the Big 12, while his 72 unassisted tackles tied for ninth in Kansas State history. During the season, he recorded at least seven tackles in 10 games, including eight of the nine Big 12 contests. He earned Big 12 Defensive Player of the Week honors following the West Virginia contest when he tallied a career-best 14 tackles, including a sack, and an interception. His effort against the Mountaineers included a career-best 12 solo stops. Lee also reached double-digit tackle marks against Stanford in the season opener contest, Oklahoma in week 6, Iowa State in week 8 and Texas A&M in the Texas Bowl. His 12 stops against the Aggies in the Texas Bowl tied for the third most in Kansas State bowl history. Lee was on the preseason watch lists for the Bednarik Award, Nagurski Trophy and Butkus Award.

After his junior year, he declared for the 2017 NFL draft.

=== Statistics ===
Year	Team	G	Tackles					Interceptions					Fumbles	
Year	Team	G	Solo	Ast	Tot	Loss	Sck	Int	Yds	Avg	TD	PD	FR	FF
2014	Kansas State	9	15	4	19	4.5	4.5	0	0	—	0	1	0	1
2015	Kansas State	13	66	14	80	7.5	5	3	2	0.7	0	1	2	1
2016	Kansas State	13	72	38	110	6.5	1.5	2	3	1.5	0	3	1	1
Total			153	56	209	18.5	11.0	5	5	1.0	0	5	3	3

== Professional career ==
=== Pre-draft ===
External videos
- Lee gets drafted by the Vikings

Lee did not attend the NFL Scouting Combine, because he missed the deadline after having declared for the draft in January. At Kansas State's pro day, Lee worked out with Minnesota Vikings linebackers coach Adam Zimmer. Measuring in at 6 ft 2 in (1.88 m), 229 pounds (104 kg), Lee ran the 40-yard dash in 4.69 seconds and completed the agility drills in 4.27 seconds (20-yard shuttle) and 6.91 seconds (3-cone drill). He also produced a 38-inch vertical jump, 18 repetitions on the bench press and a 122-inch (10 ft 2 in (3.10 m)) broad jump. Following his pro day, Lee took a pre-draft visit to Minnesota.

Pre-draft measurables
Height	Weight	Arm length	Hand span	40-yard dash	10-yard split	20-yard split	20-yard shuttle	Three-cone drill	Vertical jump	Broad jump	Bench press
6 ft 2 1/2 in (1.89 m)	229 lb (104 kg)	31 1/2 in (0.80 m)	9 in (0.23 m)	4.72 s	1.60 s	2.73 s	4.37 s	7.05 s	38 in (0.97 m)	10 ft 2 in (3.10 m)	18 reps
All values are from Pro Day

=== Minnesota Vikings ===
Lee was selected by the Minnesota Vikings in the seventh round, 232nd overall, in the 2017 NFL draft. "I'm just proud to be a Viking," Lee said after his selection. "That was one of my favorite teams and one of my top priorities, too, because they showed so much love and also because there's Kansas State alums." He was waived on September 2, 2017, and was signed to the practice squad the next day.

=== San Francisco 49ers ===
On September 13, 2017, Lee was signed by the San Francisco 49ers off the Vikings' practice squad.

On August 31, 2019, Lee was waived by the 49ers and was signed to the practice squad the next day. He was promoted to the active roster on November 5. Lee reached Super Bowl LIV with the 49ers, but lost 31–20 to the Kansas City Chiefs.

Lee did not receive a restricted free agent tender from the 49ers after the 2019 season, and he became a free agent on March 18, 2020.

=== Detroit Lions ===
On April 1, 2020, Lee signed with the Detroit Lions. He was waived on October 29, 2020.

=== Cleveland Browns ===
On October 30, 2020, Lee was claimed off waivers by the Cleveland Browns.

On March 19, 2021, Lee re-signed with the Browns. The Browns terminated Lee's contract on August 31, 2021. Lee was re-signed to the Browns' practice squad on September 1, 2021. He was elevated to the Browns' active roster on September 11, 2021, prior to the Browns' Week 1 matchup against the Kansas City Chiefs. He was then signed to the active roster on September 18, 2021. He was released on October 5, 2021, and re-signed to the Browns' practice squad on October 6, 2021, then promoted back to the active roster two days later.

=== Kansas City Chiefs ===
Lee signed with the Kansas City Chiefs on March 24, 2022. He was released on August 30, 2022, and signed to the practice squad the next day. He was elevated to the active roster on September 10, 2022, via a standard elevation which caused him to revert to the practice squad after the game. He was released on September 27, 2022, and signed to the practice squad the next day. He was elevated to the active roster on October 1, 2022, and then reverted to the practice squad after the game.

=== Chicago Bears ===
On December 20, 2022, Lee was signed by the Chicago Bears off the Chiefs practice squad.

=== St. Louis Battlehawks ===
On June 4, 2024, Lee signed with the St. Louis Battlehawks of the United Football League (UFL).
