= 2016 Texas Bowl =

2016 AdvoCare V100 Texas Bowl
- 11th Texas Bowl
Texas A&M Aggies	Kansas State Wildcats
(8–4)	(8–4)
SEC	Big 12
28	33
Head coach: Kevin Sumlin	Head coach: Bill Snyder
	1	2	3	4	Total
Texas A&M	7	7	7	7	28
Kansas State	7	16	3	7	33
- Date: December 28, 2016
- Season: 2016
- Stadium: NRG Stadium
- Location: Houston, Texas
- MVP: Jesse Ertz
- Favorite: Texas A&M by 3.5
- National anthem: Sundance Head
- Referee: Jerry McGinn (Big Ten)
- Attendance: 68,412
- Payout: US$3,000,000

United States TV coverage
- Network: ESPN/ESPN Radio
- Announcers: TV: Dave Flemming, Jesse Palmer, Laura Rutledge; Radio: Bill Rosinski, David Norrie, Ian Fitzsimmons

The 2016 Texas Bowl was an American college football bowl game played on December 28, 2016 at NRG Stadium in Houston, Texas. Sponsored by the AdvoCare nutrition and sports performance company, it is officially known as the AdvoCare V100 Texas Bowl. It was one of the 2016–17 bowl games concluding the 2016 FBS football season. The eleventh edition of the Texas Bowl, it featured the Kansas State Wildcats of the Big 12 Conference against the Texas A&M Aggies of the Southeastern Conference. This was the first meeting between the two teams since Texas A&M left the Big 12 Conference after the 2011 season.

== Game summary ==
=== Box Score ===
	1	2	3	4	Total
Aggies	7	7	7	7	28
Wildcats	7	16	3	7	33

=== Scoring summary ===
Scoring summary

Quarter	Time	Drive			Team	Scoring information	Score	
Quarter	Time	Plays	Yards	TOP	Team	Scoring information	TAMU	KSU
1	11:30	10	75	3:30	TAMU	Keith Ford 7-yard touchdown run, Daniel LaCamera kick good	7	0
1	4:52	1	79	0:11	KSU	Byron Pringle 79-yard touchdown reception from Jesse Ertz, Ian Patterson kick good	7	7
2	12:19	8	55	4:45	KSU	Ertz 5-yard touchdown run, Patterson kick blocked	7	13
2	10:00	8	75	2:19	TAMU	Ricky Seals-Jones 3-yard touchdown reception from Trevor Knight, LaCamera kick good	14	13
2	6:13	7	49	3:47	KSU	40-yard field goal by Patterson	14	16
2	3:07	2	62	0:43	KSU	Dominique Heath 52-yard touchdown run, Patterson kick good	14	23
3	6:55	10	90	4:01	TAMU	Josh Reynolds 4-yard touchdown reception from Knight, LaCamera kick good	21	23
3	2:48	9	71	4:07	KSU	25-yard field goal by Patterson	21	26
4	9:00	10	66	5:55	KSU	Ertz 1-yard touchdown run, Patterson kick good	21	33
4	7:50	3	75	1:10	TAMU	Reynolds 15-yard touchdown reception from Knight, LaCamera kick good	28	33
"TOP" = time of possession. For other American football terms, see Glossary of American football.							28	33

=== Statistics ===
Statistics	A&M	KSU
First downs	25	17
Plays–yards	76–454	53–413
Rushes–yards	28–144	41–218
Passing yards	310	195
Passing: Comp–Att–Int	30–48–1	14–20–0
Time of possession	27:11	32:49
