= Trevor Knight =

American football player (born 1993)

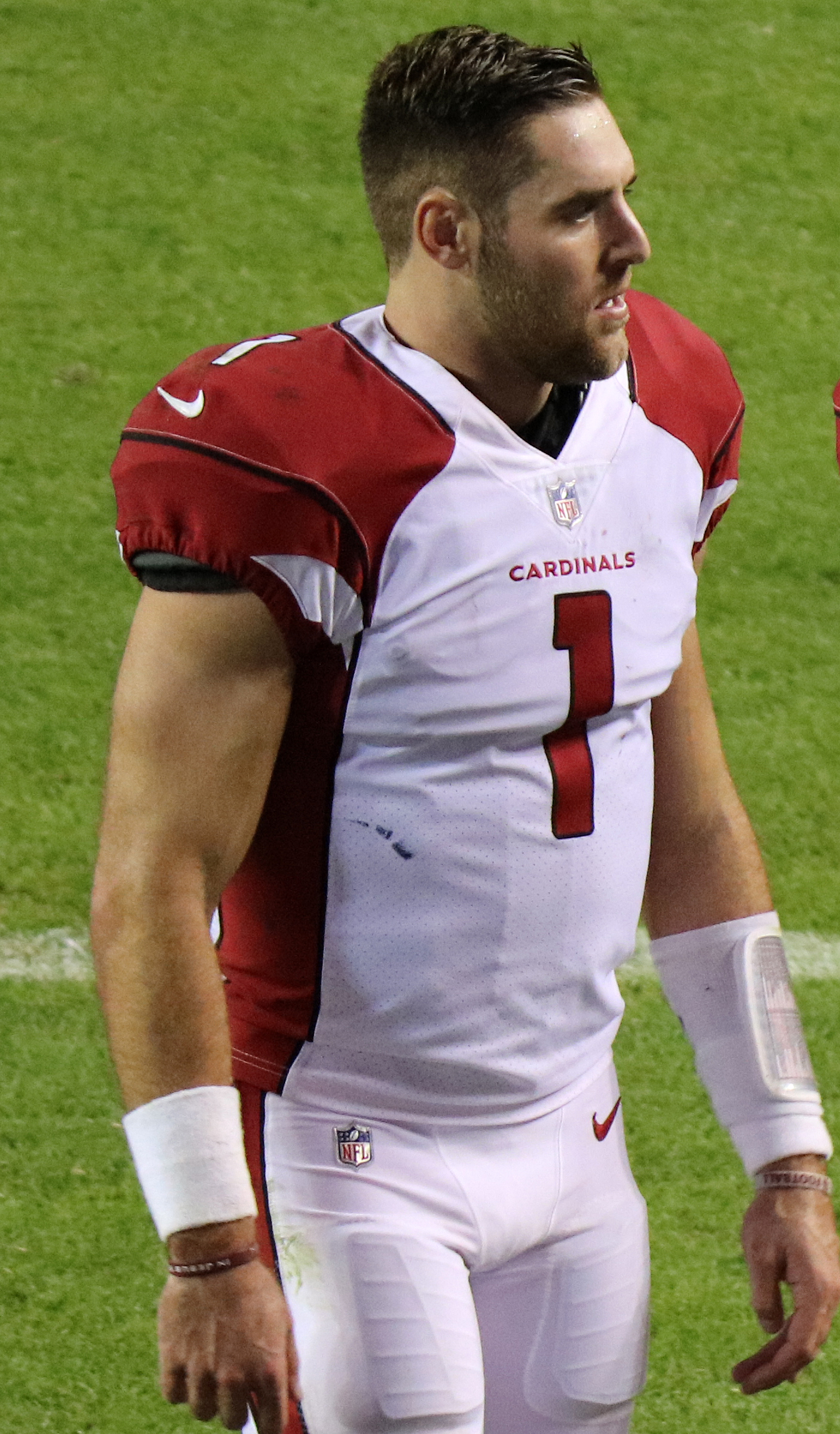
- Knight with the Arizona Cardinals in 2017

No. 8, 9, 1, 10
- Position: Quarterback

Personal information
- Born: October 3, 1993 (age 33); San Antonio, Texas, U.S.
- Listed height: 6 ft 1 in (1.85 m)
- Listed weight: 215 lb (98 kg)

Career information
- High school: Reagan (San Antonio)
- College: Oklahoma (2012–2015); Texas A&M (2016)
- NFL draft: 2017: undrafted

Career history
- Arizona Cardinals (2017)*; Atlanta Falcons (2017)*; Arizona Hotshots (2019)
- * Offseason or practice squad member only

Awards and highlights
- Wuerffel Trophy (2016)
- Stats at Pro Football Reference

Trevor A. Knight (born October 3, 1993) is an American former football quarterback. He played college football for the Oklahoma Sooners and Texas A&M Aggies. After leading Oklahoma to an 8–5 record in the 2014 season, he lost the starting job in an open quarterback competition to Texas Tech transfer Baker Mayfield prior to the 2015 season. On January 4, 2016, it was announced that Knight would transfer to Texas A&M University.

Following his college career, Knight went undrafted in 2017 and was signed by the Arizona Cardinals. He later spent the 2017 season on the Atlanta Falcons practice squad before joining the Arizona Hotshots of the Alliance of American Football in 2018, until the league ceased operations in April 2019.

== Early life ==
Knight attended Ronald Reagan High School in San Antonio, Texas. While at Ronald Reagan High School, he played for the football team. As a senior, he threw for 2,092 yards and 27 touchdowns with 943 rushing yards and 15 touchdowns. He was ranked as the sixth-best dual-threat quarterback recruit by the Rivals.com recruiting network. Trevor has a fraternal twin brother, Connor, who was a longsnapper/fullback for Oklahoma. They played alongside each other for Trevor's entire time with the Sooners; however, Connor elected to stay at OU when Trevor transferred to Texas A&M.

== College career ==
=== Oklahoma ===
On February 1, 2012, Knight committed to the University of Oklahoma under head coach Bob Stoops.

Knight was redshirted for the 2012 season.

He was named the Sooners starting quarterback as a redshirt freshman in 2013.

He was named MVP of the 2014 Sugar Bowl when he helped lead Oklahoma to a 45–31 upset of two-time reigning national champion Alabama. Knight threw for 348 yards and four touchdowns in a record-setting performance.

He began the 2014 season against Louisiana Tech, completing 19 of 34 passes for 253 yards, one touchdown, and one interception. In addition, he had four rushes for 17 yards.

On December 11, 2015, it was announced that Knight had obtained a full release from his scholarship and would explore his options to transfer to another school. Despite his intentions to transfer, Knight indicated he would remain a member of the team at least until the completion of Oklahoma's 2015 season.

=== Texas A&M ===
On January 4, 2016, Knight announced he would be transferring to Texas A&M University. He graduated from Oklahoma in December 2015 and was eligible to play immediately at Texas A&M.

Knight made his Texas A&M debut on September 3, 2016, against UCLA, which Texas A&M won in overtime by a score of 31–24.

Knight was thought to be out for the year with a shoulder injury, but made a return on senior night against LSU. In the 54–39 loss to the Tigers, he was 14-of-30 for 211 yards and three touchdowns.

=== Statistics ===
Season	Team	Passing								Rushing			
Season	Team	Cmp	Att	Pct	Yds	Y/A	TD	Int	Rtg	Att	Yds	Avg	TD
2013	Oklahoma	79	134	59.0	819	6.1	9	5	125.0	67	445	6.6	2
2014	Oklahoma	179	316	56.6	2,300	7.3	14	12	124.8	68	339	5.0	5
2015	Oklahoma	22	40	55.0	305	7.6	2	2	125.6	16	69	4.3	1
2016	Texas A&M	193	362	53.3	2,432	6.7	19	7	123.2	102	614	6.0	10
Career		473	852	55.5	5,856	6.9	44	26	124.2	253	1,467	5.8	18

== Professional career ==
Knight received an invitation to the NFL Combine and completed all the combine drills and positional drills. He finished first among all quarterbacks in the vertical jump, broad jump, and had a 40-yard dash time of 4.54. His time was also faster than some running backs including Tennessee's Alvin Kamara. His passing drills were described as mediocre and mildly inconsistent. To prepare for the combine, Knight worked out with Dallas Cowboys' quarterback Dak Prescott throughout the offseason, who was able to shed the idea of a limited dual-threat quarterback. After showcasing his physical ability at the combine, multiple teams approached him about the possibilities of converting to wide receiver or safety. He immediately dispelled those notions and claimed he wanted to stick to quarterback. On March 30, 2017, Knight participated at Texas A&M's pro day, along with Jermaine Eluemunor, Justin Evans, Myles Garrett, Daeshon Hall, Ricky Seals-Jones, Josh Reynolds, and seven others. Over 50 team representatives and scouts from the NFL attended as Knight was impressive throughout his passing drills. At the conclusion of the pre-draft process, he was projected to be a seventh round pick or a priority undrafted free agent. He was ranked the 15th best quarterback prospect by NFLDraftScout.com.

Pre-draft measurables
Height	Weight	Arm length	Hand span	40-yard dash	10-yard split	20-yard split	20-yard shuttle	Three-cone drill	Vertical jump	Broad jump	Wonderlic
6 ft 1 in (1.85 m)	219 lb (99 kg)	30 3/4 in (0.78 m)	9 3/4 in (0.25 m)	4.54 s	1.60 s	2.65 s	4.14 s	7.04 s	35.5 in (0.90 m)	10 ft 5 in (3.18 m)	30
All values from NFL Combine

=== Arizona Cardinals ===
On April 29, 2017, the Arizona Cardinals signed Knight to a three-year, $1.66 million contract after he went undrafted in the 2017 NFL draft. Throughout training camp, he competed with veteran Blaine Gabbert for the job as the third-string quarterback behind Carson Palmer and Drew Stanton. He was waived by the team on September 2, 2017, as a part of final roster cuts.

=== Atlanta Falcons ===
On September 7, 2017, Knight was signed to the Atlanta Falcons' practice squad. Knight later underwent back surgery.

=== Arizona Hotshots ===
In November 2018, Knight was selected by the Arizona Hotshots with the sixth-overall pick of the 2019 AAF QB Draft.

Knight began the 2019 AAF season as the Hotshots' backup to John Wolford. In addition to his relief duties, Knight served as a jammer on special teams, lining up for the punt return unit. Due to the AAF ceasing operations 8 weeks into the inaugural season, Knight became a free agent.

=== Career statistics ===
Year	Team	League	Games		Passing								Rushing			
Year	Team	League	GP	GS	Cmp	Att	Pct	Yds	Y/A	TD	Int	Rtg	Att	Yds	Avg	TD
2019	ARI	AAF	2	0	8	18	44.4	95	5.3	0	0	61.1	4	10	2.5	1
Career			2	0	8	18	44.4	95	5.3	0	0	61.1	4	10	2.5	1
