= Josh Reynolds (American football) =

American football player (born 1995)

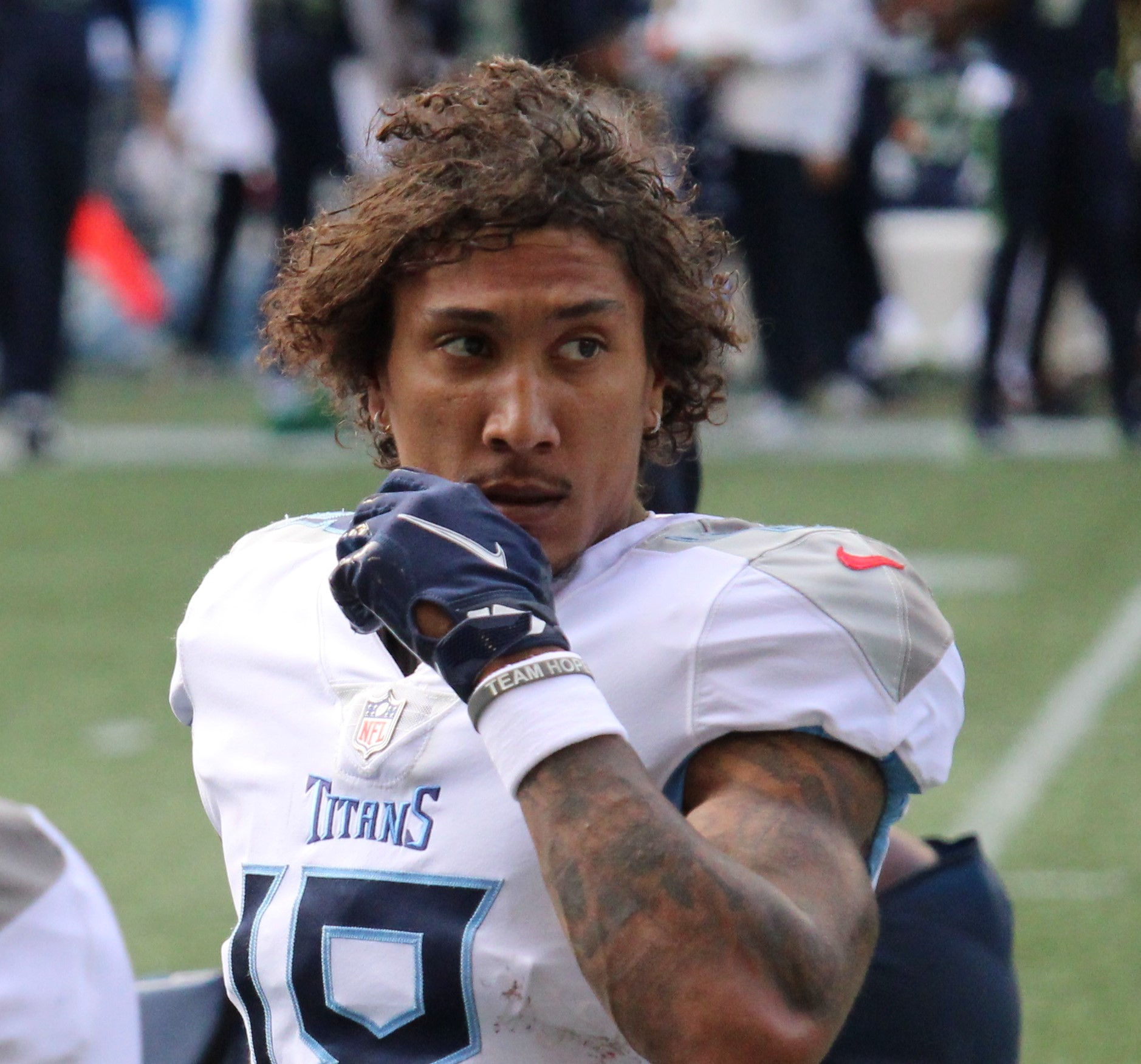
- Reynolds with the Tennessee Titans in 2021

Profile
- Position: Wide receiver

Personal information
- Born: February 16, 1995 (age 31); San Antonio, Texas, U.S.
- Listed height: 6 ft 3 in (1.91 m)
- Listed weight: 192 lb (87 kg)

Career information
- High school: John Jay (San Antonio)
- College: Tyler JC (2013); Texas A&M (2014–2016)
- NFL draft: 2017: 4th round, 117th overall pick

Career history
- Los Angeles Rams (2017–2020); Tennessee Titans (2021); Detroit Lions (2021–2023); Denver Broncos (2024); Jacksonville Jaguars (2024); New York Jets (2025)

Awards and highlights
- 2× Second-team All-SEC (2014, 2016)

Career NFL statistics as of 2025
- Receptions: 244
- Receiving yards: 3,228
- Receiving touchdowns: 20
- Stats at Pro Football Reference

Joshua Reynolds (born February 16, 1995) is an American professional football wide receiver. He played college football for the Texas A&M Aggies and holds the school's season receiving touchdown record with 13, set in 2014. Reynolds was selected by the Los Angeles Rams in the fourth round of the 2017 NFL draft.

== Early life ==
Reynolds was born on February 16, 1995, in San Antonio, Texas. He is the son of Michele Reynolds and the older brother of Moses Reynolds, a freshman defensive back for the Texas A&M Aggies.

Reynolds attended and played wide receiver and safety for the John Jay High School Mustangs high school football team. As a senior, he had a total of 44 catches for 667 yards and 48 tackles with three interceptions. Reynolds finished his high school career with a total of 102 receptions for 1859 yards on 22 touchdowns. Out of high school Reynolds was rated as three-star recruit by 247Sports.com and Rivals.com. He gained interest from a few NCAA Division I program, including Oregon State. Reynolds made a campus visit to Oregon State, but a few weeks later the Beavers informed Reynolds that all the wide receiver roster spots for the team's recruiting class were filled. Reynolds then signed with Tyler Junior College.

== College career ==
=== Tyler Junior College (2013) ===
As a freshman at Tyler Junior College in 2013, Reynolds accumulated a total of 782 yards on 44 catches and was named to the second-team all conference. After his better than average freshman season, he managed to pick up a couple of offers. He was ranked as a three-star junior college recruit by Rivals.com. Most notable offers were from Texas A&M and Oregon. Other schools did make offers after his freshman season as well, including Boise State and TCU. Reynolds signed to play college football for Texas A&M.

=== Texas A&M ===
==== 2014 season ====
In his first season at Texas A&M, in 2014, Reynolds was an instant contributor. In his first game with the Aggies, he had six receptions for 76 receiving yards and one receiving touchdown in a victory over South Carolina. On September 13, against Rice, he had two receptions for 68 receiving yards and two receiving touchdowns. The next week, against SMU, he had a 70-yard receiving touchdown. In the following game, against Arkansas, he had four receptions for 89 receiving yards and a receiving touchdown. The next week, against Mississippi State, he had seven receptions for 66 receiving yards and two receiving touchdowns. On November 8, against Auburn, he had six receptions for 88 receiving yards and two receiving touchdowns. In the following game, against Missouri, he had five receptions for 125 receiving yards and two receiving touchdowns. Overall, he caught 52 passes for 842 receiving yards and 13 receiving touchdowns. The 13 touchdowns set a Texas A&M Aggies season school record, breaking the mark of 12 previously held by Pro Bowler Mike Evans and Jeff Fuller. He finished seventh in receptions, fourth in receiving yards, and second in receiving touchdowns in the SEC.

==== 2015 ====
Reynolds started off the season with three receiving touchdowns in the first three games, victories over Arizona State, Ball State, and Nevada. On September 26, against Arkansas, he had three receptions for 106 receiving yards. In the following game, against Mississippi State, he had a then career-high 141 receiving yards on seven receptions. On November 21, against Vanderbilt, he had three receptions for 105 receiving yards and one receiving touchdown. As a junior, Reynolds totaled 51 receptions for 907 receiving yards and five receiving touchdowns. In the last game of his junior year, against Louisville on December 30, 2015, in the 2015 Music City Bowl, Reynolds recorded career highs in receptions (11) and receiving yards (177). He finished sixth in receiving yards in the SEC in 2015.

==== 2016 ====
Going into his senior season, Reynolds had the choice of entering the National Football League Draft or staying for his final year with Texas A&M. In October 2015, the NFL Network ranked Reynolds as one of the best prospects in college football. Reynolds chose to stay at Texas A&M. Reynolds started the season with four receptions for 78 receiving yards and a receiving touchdown against UCLA. Two weeks later, against Auburn, he had seven receptions for 98 receiving yards and a receiving touchdown. On September 24, against Arkansas, he had four receptions for 141 receiving yards and a receiving touchdown. On October 8, against Tennessee in a 45–38 2OT victory, he had five receptions for 89 receiving yards and one receiving touchdown. The Tennessee game started a streak of eight consecutive games with a receiving touchdown for Reynolds. In his final collegiate game, the 2016 Texas Bowl against Kansas State, he had 12 receptions for 154 receiving yards and two receiving touchdowns. He finished his college career with A&M with receiving touchdowns (12) and receiving yards (1,039). He finished the 2016 season leading the SEC in receiving yards and receiving touchdowns. Reynolds studied recreation, park, and tourism science at Texas A&M.

== Professional career ==
Pre-draft measurables
Height	Weight	Arm length	Hand span	Wingspan	40-yard dash	10-yard split	20-yard split	20-yard shuttle	Three-cone drill	Vertical jump	Broad jump
6 ft 2 7/8 in (1.90 m)	194 lb (88 kg)	31 1/2 in (0.80 m)	9 3/8 in (0.24 m)	6 ft 4 1/2 in (1.94 m)	4.52 s	1.57 s	2.64 s	4.13 s	6.83 s	37.0 in (0.94 m)	10 ft 4 in (3.15 m)
All values from NFL Combine

=== Los Angeles Rams ===
Reynolds received an invitation to the Senior Bowl. He was selected in the fourth round, 117th overall, by the Los Angeles Rams in the 2017 NFL draft. On June 21, 2017, the Rams signed Reynolds to a four-year contract.

During Week 2 against the Washington Redskins, Reynolds made his NFL debut with a 28-yard pass reception on a successful fake punt from Johnny Hekker. During Week 12 against the New Orleans Saints, Reynolds made his first NFL start, catching four passes for 37 yards and a 7-yard touchdown pass from Jared Goff to help the Rams win 26–20. Reynolds finished his rookie season with 11 catches for 104 yards and a touchdown.

Reynolds began the 2018 season as a backup, but after fellow wide receiver Cooper Kupp went down with a season-ending torn ACL, Reynolds had an increased role in the offense, starting eight total games, including the final six of the regular season. He finished the season with 29 receptions for 402 yards and five touchdowns. He helped the Rams earn the No. 2-seed in the NFC Playoffs. The Rams defeated the Dallas Cowboys by a score of 30–22 in the Divisional Round with Reynolds having a 19-yard reception. In the NFC Championship, Reynolds had four receptions for 74 yards as the Rams defeated the Saints on the road by a score of 26–23 in overtime. The Rams faced the New England Patriots in Super Bowl LIII. Reynolds recorded three catches for 28 yards, but the Rams lost 13–3.

In the 2019 season, Reynolds finished with 21 receptions for 326 yards. His best performance came in London, where he caught three passes for 73 yards and his only touchdown of the season, a 31-yard score in the Rams' 24–10 win over the Cincinnati Bengals at Wembley Stadium as part of the NFL International Series.

Reynolds set career single-season highs in receptions (52) and yardage (618) in 2020, starting 13 of 16 games for the Rams. In a Week 10 matchup against Seattle Seahawks, Reynolds caught eight passes for 94 yards, both single-season career highs, in the Rams' 23–16 victory over the Seahawks.

=== Tennessee Titans ===
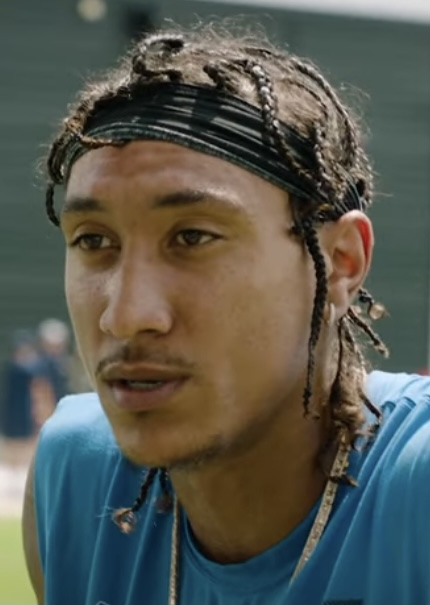
Reynolds with the Titans in 2021

On March 23, 2021, Reynolds signed a one-year contract with the Tennessee Titans. He appeared in only five games for the Titans, catching 10 passes for 90 yards with no touchdowns. On November 9, 2021, Reynolds was waived.

=== Detroit Lions ===
On November 10, 2021, Reynolds was claimed off waivers by the Detroit Lions. For the remainder of the 2021 season, Reynolds played in seven games (starting in five) and finished with 29 receptions for 396 yards and two receiving touchdowns. In a 30–12 win over the Arizona Cardinals in Week 15, Reynolds caught a season-high six receptions for 68 yards and a touchdown.

On March 9, 2022, Reynolds signed a two-year, $6 million contract extension with the Lions. In the 2022 season, Reynolds appeared in 14 games and started 11. He finished with 38 receptions for 479 receiving yards and three receiving touchdowns.

During the 2023 regular season, Reynolds played in all 17 games, starting in 13, and caught 40 passes for 608 yards and five touchdowns. In the Lions' NFC Wild Card Round against the Los Angeles Rams, Reynolds matched his season highs for receptions (five) and yardage (80) to help Detroit prevail 24–23 over the team that had originally drafted him. He had a receiving touchdown in the 31–23 win over the Buccaneers in the Divisional Round. During the 2023 NFC Championship game against the San Francisco 49ers, Reynolds failed to secure an open fourth-down target, and later on, he again dropped a catch on third-and-long, leading to a Detroit punt with the game tied. The Lions went on to lose the game 31-34.

=== Denver Broncos ===
On March 27, 2024, Reynolds signed a two-year, $9 million contract with the Denver Broncos. On October 12, Reynolds was placed on injured reserve after suffering a hand injury in the Broncos' Week 5 victory over the Las Vegas Raiders in which he caught a 9-yard touchdown pass. On October 18, Reynolds was wounded in a shooting which took place in Denver. On December 3, Reynolds was waived by the Broncos.

=== Jacksonville Jaguars ===
On December 4, 2024, Reynolds was claimed off waivers by the Jacksonville Jaguars. In the 2024 season, he finished with 13 receptions for 194 yards and a touchdown over his time with both the Broncos and Jaguars.

On March 6, 2025, Reynolds was released by the Jaguars.

=== New York Jets ===
On March 27, 2025, Reynolds signed a one-year contract with the New York Jets, worth up to $5 million. On October 25, Reynolds was placed on injured reserve due to a hip injury. In the 2025 season, he appeared in five games and had 11 receptions for 101 yards.

=== New Orleans Saints ===
In August 2026, Reynolds tried out for the New Orleans Saints.

=== Houston Texans ===
On August 21, 2026, Reynolds tried out for the Houston Texans.

== Career statistics ==
=== NFL ===
==== Regular season ====
Year	Team	Games		Receiving					Rushing					Fumbles	
Year	Team	GP	GS	Rec	Yds	Avg	Lng	TD	Att	Yds	Avg	Lng	TD	Fum	Lost
2017	LAR	16	1	11	104	9.5	28	1	0	0	0.0	0	0	0	0
2018	LAR	16	8	29	402	13.9	33	5	2	8	4.0	10	0	0	0
2019	LAR	16	2	21	326	15.5	31	1	5	23	4.6	12	0	0	0
2020	LAR	16	13	52	618	11.9	40	2	1	5	5.0	5	0	2	1
2021	TEN	5	0	10	90	9.0	12	0	0	0	0.0	0	0	0	0
2021	DET	7	5	19	306	16.1	39	2	0	0	0.0	0	0	0	0
2022	DET	13	11	38	479	12.6	31	3	0	0	0.0	0	0	0	0
2023	DET	17	13	40	608	15.2	33	5	0	0	0.0	0	0	1	1
2024	DEN	5	1	12	183	15.3	49	1	0	0	0.0	0	0	0	0
2024	JAX	4	1	1	11	11.0	11	0	0	0	0.0	0	0	0	0
2025	NYJ	5	3	11	101	9.2	13	0	0	0	0.0	0	0	0	0
Career		121	58	244	3,228	13.2	49	20	8	36	4.5	12	0	3	2

==== Postseason ====
Year	Team	Games		Receiving					Rushing					Fumbles	
Year	Team	GP	GS	Rec	Yds	Avg	Lng	TD	Att	Yds	Avg	Lng	TD	Fum	Lost
2017	LAR	1	0	0	0	0.0	0	0	0	0	0.0	0	0	0	0
2018	LAR	3	2	8	121	15.1	33	0	2	25	12.5	16	0	0	0
2020	LAR	2	1	3	65	21.7	28	0	0	0	0.0	0	0	0	0
2023	DET	3	2	8	132	16.5	33	1	0	0	0.0	0	0	0	0
Career		9	5	19	318	16.7	33	1	2	25	12.5	16	0	0	0

=== College ===
Season	Team	Conf	Class	Pos	GP	Receiving			
Season	Team	Conf	Class	Pos	GP	Rec	Yds	Avg	TD
2014	Texas A&M	SEC	SO	WR	13	52	842	16.2	13
2015	Texas A&M	SEC	JR	WR	12	51	907	17.8	5
2016	Texas A&M	SEC	SR	WR	13	61	1,039	17.0	12
Career					38	164	2,788	17.0	30
