= Shelton Gibson =

American football player (born 1994)

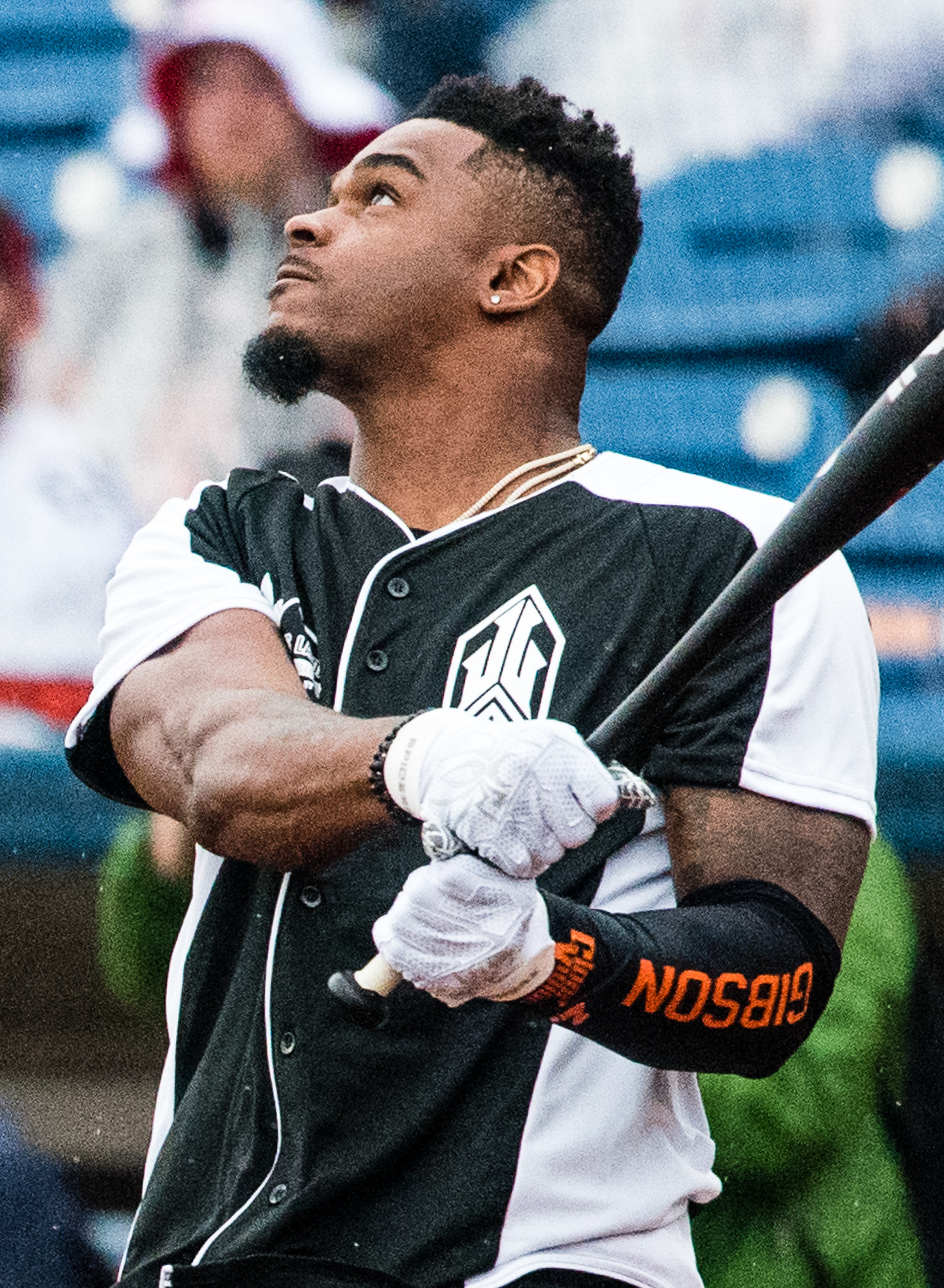
- Gibson in 2019

No. 18, 83
- Position: Wide receiver

Personal information
- Born: March 20, 1994 (age 32); Cleveland, Ohio, U.S.
- Listed height: 5 ft 11 in (1.80 m)
- Listed weight: 191 lb (87 kg)

Career information
- High school: Cleveland Heights (Cleveland Heights, Ohio)
- College: West Virginia
- NFL draft: 2017: 5th round, 166th overall pick

Career history
- Philadelphia Eagles (2017–2018); Cleveland Browns (2019)*; Philadelphia Eagles (2019); Washington Football Team (2020)*; Carolina Panthers (2020)*; BC Lions (2022)*
- * Offseason or practice squad member only

Awards and highlights
- Super Bowl champion (LII); First-team All-Big 12 (2016)

Career NFL statistics
- Receptions: 3
- Receiving yards: 59
- Stats at Pro Football Reference

Shelton DeAndre Gibson (born March 20, 1994) is an American former professional football player who was a wide receiver in the National Football League (NFL). He played college football for the West Virginia Mountaineers and was selected by the Philadelphia Eagles in the fifth round of the 2017 NFL draft.

== Early life ==
Gibson attended Cleveland Heights High School in Cleveland Heights, Ohio. He committed to West Virginia University to play college football.

== College career ==
Gibson played at West Virginia from 2013 to 2016. After his junior year, he entered the 2017 NFL draft. He finished his career with 84 receptions for 1,898 yards and 17 touchdowns.

== Professional career ==
Pre-draft measurables
Height	Weight	Arm length	Hand span	40-yard dash	20-yard shuttle	Three-cone drill	Vertical jump	Broad jump	Bench press
5 ft 10 3/4 in (1.80 m)	191 lb (87 kg)	32 in (0.81 m)	8 7/8 in (0.23 m)	4.50 s	4.20 s	6.83 s	32.0 in (0.81 m)	9 ft 10 in (3.00 m)	8 reps
All values from NFL Combine

=== Philadelphia Eagles (first stint) ===
Gibson was selected by the Philadelphia Eagles in the fifth round, 166th overall, in the 2017 NFL draft. He finished his rookie year with 11 receiving yards. The Eagles finished with a 13–3 record, clinching the National Football Conference (NFC) East division, and eventually made it to Super Bowl LII, where they would win their first Super Bowl after defeating the New England Patriots, 41–33.

In the 2018 season opener against the Atlanta Falcons, Gibson handled some kick return duties for the first time in his professional career. In the 18–12 victory, he had two kick returns for 43 net yards. He was waived/injured on August 12, 2019, and was subsequently placed on injured reserve after clearing waivers on August 13. He was waived from injured reserve with an injury settlement on August 21.

=== Cleveland Browns ===
Gibson was signed to the practice squad of the Cleveland Browns on September 1, 2019.

=== Philadelphia Eagles (second stint) ===
Gibson was signed off of the Browns' practice squad to the Eagles' active roster on January 1, 2020, ahead of the Eagles' wild card playoff match up against the Seattle Seahawks. He was targeted once, drawing a pass interference penalty. He was waived on July 26, 2020.

=== Washington Football Team ===
Gibson was signed to the practice squad of the Washington Football Team on September 7, 2020. He was released on September 17.

=== Carolina Panthers ===
Gibson signed to the Carolina Panthers' practice squad on November 2, 2020. He was released on November 20. He was re-signed to the practice squad on December 4, and released again on December 14.

=== BC Lions ===
Gibson signed with the BC Lions of the Canadian Football League on January 27, 2022. He was released on May 23, 2022.
