= Patrick Levels =

American gridiron football player (born 1994)

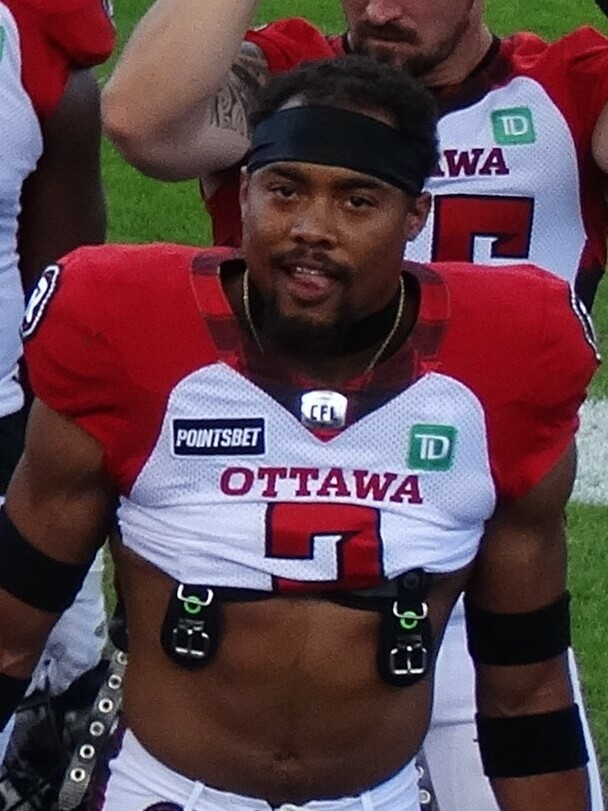
- Levels with the Ottawa Redblacks in 2022

No. 3
- Position: Defensive back

Personal information
- Born: July 13, 1994 (age 32); Dallas, Texas, U.S.
- Listed height: 5 ft 11 in (1.80 m)
- Listed weight: 196 lb (89 kg)

Career information
- High school: Dallas Roosevelt
- College: Baylor

Career history
- 2017–2018: Calgary Stampeders
- 2019: Montreal Alouettes
- 2020: Hamilton Tiger-Cats*
- 2021: Montreal Alouettes
- 2022: Ottawa Redblacks
- * Offseason or practice squad member only

Awards and highlights
- Grey Cup champion (2018); CFL East All-Star (2019)
- Stats at CFL.ca

Patrick Levels (born July 13, 1994) is an American former professional football defensive back who played in the Canadian Football League (CFL) with the Calgary Stampeders, Montreal Alouettes, and Ottawa Redblacks. He played college football at Baylor University.

== Professional career ==
=== Calgary Stampeders ===
Levels played for the Calgary Stampeders from 2017 to 2018 and won his first Grey Cup championship following the Stampeders' victory in the 106th Grey Cup game.

=== Montreal Alouettes (first stint) ===
After signing as a free agent with the Montreal Alouettes, Levels played in all 18 games where he had 86 defensive tackles, five sacks, and two forced fumbles and was named a CFL East All-Star at year's end.

=== Hamilton Tiger-Cats ===
On February 12, 2020, Levels signed with the Hamilton Tiger-Cats. However, the 2020 CFL season was cancelled and he did not play for the team.

=== Montreal Alouettes (second stint) ===
Levels re-signed with the Alouettes on February 9, 2021. In 12 games, he recorded 42 defensive tackles, three sacks, one interception, and one touchdown. He became a free agent upon the expiry of his contract on February 8, 2022.

=== Ottawa Redblacks ===
On February 9, 2022, it was announced that Levels had signed with the Ottawa Redblacks. He had a productive season for Ottawa in 2022, playing in 13 regular season games contributing with 59 tackles, four sacks, and one forced fumble. On May 16, 2023 the Redblacks announced they had released Levels.
