= Ryan McCollum =

American football player (born 1998)

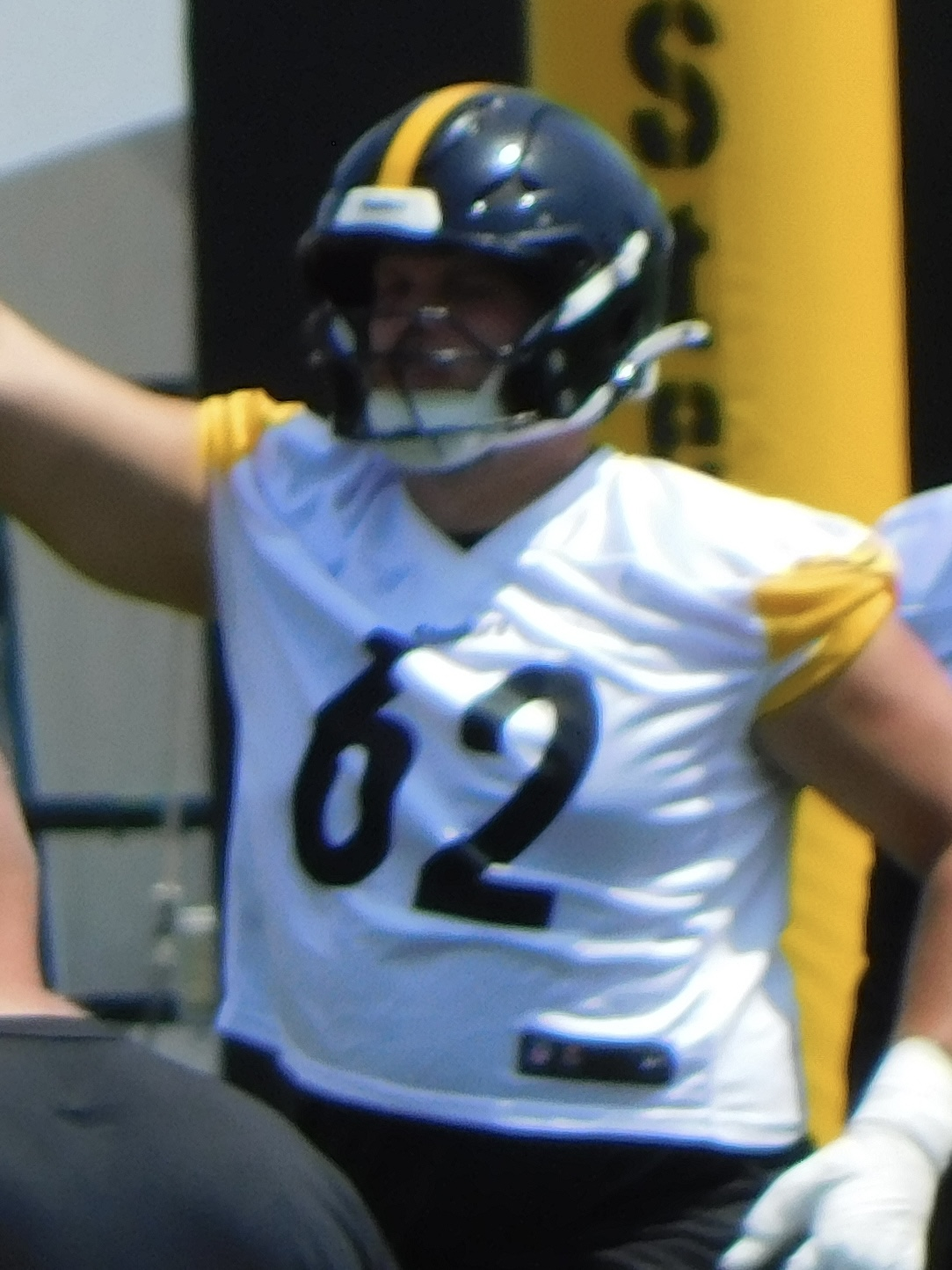
- McCollum with the Pittsburgh Steelers in 2025

No. 62 – Pittsburgh Steelers
- Position: Center
- Roster status: Active

Personal information
- Born: March 4, 1998 (age 28); Spring, Texas, U.S.
- Listed height: 6 ft 5 in (1.96 m)
- Listed weight: 300 lb (136 kg)

Career information
- High school: Klein Oak (Spring)
- College: Texas A&M (2016–2020)
- NFL draft: 2021: undrafted

Career history
- Houston Texans (2021)*; Detroit Lions (2021); Pittsburgh Steelers (2022–present)
- * Offseason or practice squad member only

Career NFL statistics as of Week 7, 2026
- Games played: 54
- Games started: 4
- Stats at Pro Football Reference

Ryan McCollum (born March 4, 1998) is an American professional football center for the Pittsburgh Steelers of the National Football League (NFL). He played college football for the Texas A&M Aggies.

== College career ==
In August 2015, McCollum verbally committed to play college football at Oklahoma State. On December 2, 2015, he decommitted from Oklahoma State, and committed to Texas A&M on December 13, 2015. He played at Texas A&M from 2016 to 2020.

In 2017, he appeared in 13 games, with seven starts. In 2018, he appeared in 12 games with seven starts. In 2019, he appeared in eight games, and was awarded the Offensive Unselfish Leadership Award at the annual team banquet.

In 2020, he served as the offensive team captain in five games. He was named the Southeastern Conference Offensive Lineman of the Week for the week ending December 7, 2020. On January 6, 2021, he declared for the 2021 NFL draft.

== Professional career ==
Pre-draft measurables
Height	Weight	Arm length	Hand span	Wingspan	40-yard dash	10-yard split	20-yard split	20-yard shuttle	Three-cone drill	Vertical jump	Broad jump	Bench press
6 ft 5 1/4 in (1.96 m)	307 lb (139 kg)	33 5/8 in (0.85 m)	10 1/4 in (0.26 m)	6 ft 8 7/8 in (2.05 m)	5.30 s	1.89 s	3.03 s	4.80 s	7.71 s	29.5 in (0.75 m)	8 ft 2 in (2.49 m)	20 reps
All values from Pro Day

=== Houston Texans ===
On May 14, 2021, the Houston Texans signed McCollum as an undrafted college free agent.

=== Detroit Lions ===
On October 6, 2021, the Detroit Lions signed McCollum off the Texans' practice squad. On December 12, 2021, McCollum made his first career NFL start.

On March 10, 2022, McCollum re-signed with the Lions. On August 15, the Lions waived McCollum.

=== Pittsburgh Steelers ===
On August 16, 2022, the Pittsburgh Steelers claimed McCollum off waivers from Detroit. He was waived on August 30 and signed to the practice squad the next day. McCollum was released by Pittsburgh on September 30, and re–signed to the practice squad four days later. He signed a reserve/future contract on January 10, 2023.

On August 29, 2023, McCollum was released by the Steelers. He re-signed to the practice squad on September 13. On January 17, 2024, he signed a reserve/futures contract with the Steelers. On October 20, 2024, McCollum made his first start with the Steelers.

On March 20, 2026, McCollum re-signed with the Steelers on a one-year contract.

== Personal life ==
On September 15, 2018, McCollum was arrested for reckless driving and evading a campus police officer; on September 28, 2018, all charges were dropped.

In July 2020, McCollum married his wife, Maddie Douglas, a former Texas A&M volleyball player. Their daughter was born in June 2023. Their son was born in December 2025.
