= 2016 Kansas State Wildcats football team =

American college football season

2016 Kansas State Wildcats football

Texas Bowl champion

Texas Bowl, W 33–28 vs. Texas A&M
- Conference: Big 12 Conference
- Record: 9–4 (6–3 Big 12)
- Head coach: Bill Snyder (25th season)
- Co-offensive coordinators: Dana Dimel (10th season); Del Miller (17th season)
- Offensive scheme: Multiple
- Defensive coordinator: Tom Hayes (5th season)
- Base defense: 4–3
- Home stadium: Bill Snyder Family Football Stadium

2016 Big 12 Conference football standings
	Conf.			Overall
Team	W		L	W		L
No. 5 Oklahoma $	9	–	0	11	–	2
No. 11 Oklahoma State	7	–	2	10	–	3
No. 18 West Virginia	7	–	2	10	–	3
Kansas State	6	–	3	9	–	4
TCU	4	–	5	6	–	7
Baylor	3	–	6	7	–	6
Texas	3	–	6	5	–	7
Texas Tech	3	–	6	5	–	7
Iowa State	2	–	7	3	–	9
Kansas	1	–	8	2	–	10
$ – Conference champion; Rankings from AP Poll

The 2016 Kansas State Wildcats football team represented Kansas State University in the 2016 NCAA Division I FBS football season. The Wildcats played their home games at Bill Snyder Family Football Stadium, in Manhattan, Kansas as they have since 1968. The Wildcats were led by head coach Bill Snyder in his 25th overall and eighth straight season since taking over for his second tenure in 2009. 2016 was the 121st season in school history. K-State was a member of the Big 12 Conference. Kansas State won the Texas Bowl against former Big 12 opponent, Texas A&M.

== Previous season ==
The 2015 Kansas State Wildcats football team finished the regular season 6–7 and played against Arkansas in the Liberty Bowl, which they lost 23–45.

== Schedule ==
Date	Time	Opponent	Site	TV	Result	Attendance
September 2	8:00 p.m.	at No. 8 Stanford*	Stanford Stadium; Stanford, CA	FS1	L 13–26	46,147
September 17	1:30 p.m.	Florida Atlantic*	Bill Snyder Family Stadium; Manhattan, KS	FSN	W 63–7	50,871
September 24	6:00 p.m.	Missouri State*	Bill Snyder Family Football Stadium; Manhattan, KS	K-StateHD.TV	W 35–0	51,686
October 1	2:30 p.m.	at West Virginia	Mountaineer Field at Milan Puskar Stadium; Morgantown, WV	ESPNU	L 16–17	61,701
October 8	6:00 p.m.	Texas Tech	Bill Snyder Family Football Stadium; Manhattan, KS	ESPNU	W 44–38	51,540
October 15	11:00 a.m.	at No. 19 Oklahoma	Gaylord Family Oklahoma Memorial Stadium; Norman, OK (rivalry)	ESPN	L 17–38	86,049
October 22	11:00 a.m.	Texas^{†}	Bill Snyder Family Stadium; Manhattan, KS	ESPN2	W 24–21	52,328
October 29	11:00 a.m.	at Iowa State	Jack Trice Stadium; Ames, IA (rivalry)	FSN	W 31–26	52,763
November 5	2:30 p.m.	No. 22 Oklahoma State	Bill Snyder Family Stadium; Manhattan, KS	ABC/ESPN2	L 37–43	52,450
November 19	11:00 a.m.	at Baylor	McLane Stadium; Waco, TX	ESPN2	W 42–21	43,581
November 26	11:00 a.m.	Kansas	Bill Snyder Family Stadium; Manhattan, KS (rivalry)	FS1	W 34–19	52,637
December 3	11:00 a.m.	at TCU	Amon G. Carter Stadium; Fort Worth, TX	FS1	W 30–6	42,746
December 28	8:00 p.m.	vs. Texas A&M*	NRG Stadium; Houston, TX (Texas Bowl)	ESPN	W 33–28	68,412
*Non-conference game; ^{†}Homecoming; Rankings from AP Poll released prior to the game; All times are in Central time

== Game summaries ==
=== At Stanford ===
	1	2	3	4	Total
Wildcats	0	3	3	7	13
#8 Cardinal	3	14	0	9	26

=== Florida Atlantic ===
	1	2	3	4	Total
Owls	0	0	0	7	7
Wildcats	21	21	7	14	63

=== Missouri State ===
	1	2	3	4	Total
Bears	0	0			0
Wildcats	14	21			35

Game was called off at the halftime due to weather.

=== At West Virginia ===
	1	2	3	4	Total
Wildcats	7	6	3	0	16
Mountaineers	0	0	3	14	17

=== Texas Tech ===
Week Six: Texas Tech Red Raiders at Kansas State Wildcats – Game summary

Quarter	1	2	3	4	Total
Red Raiders	14	14	3	7	38
Wildcats	14	17	0	13	44

at Bill Snyder Family Stadium, Manhattan, KS

- Date: October 8
- Game time: 6:00 p.m.
- Game weather: Temperature: 68 °F (20 °C) • Weather: clear • Wind: S 11 MPH
- Game attendance: 51,540
- Referee: Referee: Eddy Shelton, Umpire: Rick Podraza, Linesman: Rick Smith, Line judge: Scott Reilly, Back judge: Terry White, Field judge: Nick Lave, Side judge: Richard Corona, Center judge: Mike Cuttone
- TV announcers (ESPNU): Clay Matvick (play-by-play), Dusty Dvoracek (color), Shelley Smith (reporter)
- Source: Big 12

Game information

First quarter

- TTU 9:48 – Patrick Mahomes 1 yard run (Clayton Hatfield kick), TTU 7–0
- KSU 6:28 – Isaiah Zuber 12 yard pass from Jesse Ertz (Matthew McCrane kick), tied 7–7
- KSU 4:19 – D.J. Reed 35 yard interception return (Matthew McCrane kick), KSU 14–7
- TTU 2:38 – Keke Coutee 61 yard pass from Patrick Mahomes (Clayton Hatfield kick), tied 14–14

Second quarter

- KSU 14:09 – Matthew McCrane 20 yard field goal, KSU 17–14
- TTU 11:19 – Patrick Mahomes 16 yard run (Clayton Hatfield kick), TTU 21–17
- KSU 5:43 – Jesse Ertz 1 yard run (Matthew McCrane kick), KSU 24–21
- TTU 1:47 – Patrick Mahomes 3 yard run (Clayton Hatfield kick), TTU 28–24
- KSU 1:31 – Byron Pringle 99 yard kickoff return (Matthew McCrane kick), KSU 31–28

Third quarter

- TTU 5:17 – Clayton Hatfield 34 yard field goal, tied 31–31

Fourth quarter

- KSU 14:07 – Charles Jones 2 yard run (Matthew McCrane kick), KSU 38–31
- KSU 6:05 – Matthew McCrane 25 yard field goal, KSU 41–31
- KSU 1:56 – Matthew McCrane 42 yard field goal, KSU 44–31
- TTU 0:05 – Cameron Batson 15 yard pass from Patrick Mahomes (Clayton Hatfield kick), KSU 44–38

Leading Passers

- TTU – Patrick Mahomes 45/62, 504 yards, 2 TD, INT
- KSU – Jesse Ertz 10/20, 104 yards, TD

Leading Rushers

- TTU – Demarcus Felton 14 carries, 66 yards
- KSU – Charles Jones 19 carries, 128 yards, TD

Leading Receivers

- TTU – Keke Coutee5 receptions, 130 yards, TD
- KSU – Isaiah Zuber 3 receptions, 35 yards, TD

Despite leaving last week's game with a shoulder injury, Patrick Mahomes started as quarterback for the Red Raiders. Texas Tech had several miscues during the first half as a Mahomes pass was intercepted by D. J. Reed and returned 35 yards for a pick six touchdown. Later in the second quarter, Kansas State's Byron Pringle returned a kickoff 99 yards for a touchdown to give the Wildcats a 31–28 lead going into the half. Both teams slowed down in the third quarter, with the only score of the quarter coming from a 34-yard Clayton Hatfield field goal to tie the game 31–31. Kansas State opened the game up during the fourth, leading 44–31 with just under 2 minutes to go. Despite trailing by 13 with little time left, the Red Raiders refused to give up. Texas Tech scored a touchdown with 5 seconds left and trailed 38–44. The Red Raiders recovered an onside kick with the hope of a comeback still alive, but Mahomes was sacked on the next play to end the game.

=== At Oklahoma ===
Kansas State Wildcats @ No. 19 Oklahoma Sooners – Game Summary

Quarter	1	2	3	4	Total
Kansas State	0	10	0	7	17
#19 Oklahoma	14	10	7	7	38

at Gaylord Family Oklahoma Memorial Stadium • Norman OK

- Date: October 15, 2016
- Game time: 11:01 a.m. CDT
- Game weather: 75 °F (24 °C) • Wind:S 21 • Weather: Partly Sunny
- Game attendance: 86,049
- Referee: Referee: Brad Van Vark, *Umpire: Michael Cooper, *Linesman: George Gusman, *Line Judge: Frank LeBlanc, *Back Judge: Brian Ernest, *Field Judge: Jason Ledet, *Side Judge: Gene Semko
- TV announcers (ESPN): Mark Jones (Play-By-Play), Rod Gilmore (Color) & Quint Kessenich (Sideline)

Game information

First Quarter

- OU 12:24– Samaje Perine 25 yd pass from Baker Mayfield; Austin Seibert XP Good (OU 7–0)
- OU 6:00 – Joe Mixon 8 yd pass from Baker Mayfield; Austin Seibert XP Good (OU 14–0)

Second Quarter

- KS 12:28 – Jesse Ertz 2 yd run; Matthew McCrane XP Good (OU 14–7)
- OU 10:39 – Dede Westbrook 26 yd pass from Joe Mixon; Austin Seibert XP Good (OU 21–7)
- KS 7:41 – Matthew McCrane 25 yd field goal (OU 21–10)
- OU 0:16 – Austin Seibert 34 yd field goal (OU 24–10)

Third Quarter

- OU 1:08 – Dede Westbrook 8 yd pass from Baker Mayfield; Austin Seibert XP Good (OU 31–10)

Fourth Quarter

- KS 12:40 – Dominique Heath 54 yd pass from Joe Hubener; Matthew McCrane XP Good (OU 31–17)
- OU 6:31 – Dede Westbrook 88 yd pass from Baker Mayfield; Austin Seibert XP Good (OU 38–17)

Top Passing

- KS – Joe Hubener 12/23, 157 yds, 1 TD
- OU – Baker Mayfield 25/31, 346 yds, 4 TD

Top Rushers

- KS – Jesse Ertz 7 attempts, 40 yds, 1 TD
- OU – Joe Mixon 19 attempts, 88 yds

Top Receiving

- KS – Dominique Heath 7 attempts, 101 yds, 1 TD
- OU – Dede Westbrook 9 attempts, 184 yds, 3 TD

Top Tacklers

- KS – Kendall Adams 11 tackles
- OU – Steven Parker 8 tackles

=== Texas ===
Texas at Kansas State

Team	1	2	3	4	Total
Texas (TEX)	0	7	7	7	21
• Kansas State (KSU)	7	14	3	0	24

- Date: October 22, 2016
- Location: Manhattan, Kansas
- Game start: 11:00 a.m. CDT
- Elapsed time: 3:19
- Game attendance: 52,328
- Game weather: Clear; 53 °F (12 °C), wind SW at 7 mph (11 km/h)
- Referee: Mike Defee
- TV announcers (ESPN2): Beth Mowins, Anthony Becht, Rocky Boiman

=== At Iowa State ===
Game Eight: Kansas State Wildcats at Iowa State Cyclones – Game summary

Quarter	1	2	3	4	Total
Kansas State	3	14	14	0	31
Cyclones	3	0	7	16	26

at Jack Trice Stadium, Ames, IA

- Date: October 29
- Game time: 11:05 a.m. CDT
- Game weather: Temperature: 62° • Wind: E 0–5 • Weather: Mostly Sunny
- Game attendance: 52,763
- Referee: Referee: Reggie Smith • Umpire: Tab Slaughter • Linesman: Mike Moeller • Line judge: Mark Stewart • Back judge: Lyndon Nixon • Field judge: Matt Mills • Side judge: Tim Murray
- TV: FSN

Game information

First quarter

- KSU - 10:12 M. McCrane 23 yd field goal good KSU 3–0)
- ISU – 05:23 Cole Netten 24 yd field goal good (Tie 3–3)

Second quarter

- KSU - 14:24 Deante Burton 11 yd pass from Jesse Ertz, M. McCrane XP good (KSU 10–3)
- KSU - 08:03 Justin Silmon 3 yd run, M. McCrane XP good (17–3)

Third quarter

- ISU - D. Jones 24 yd pass form Jacob Park, Cole Netten XP good (KSU 17–10)
- KSU - 05:24 Winston Dimel 1 yd run, M. McCrane XP good (KSU 24–10)
- KSU - 00:27 Alex Barnes 8 yd run, M. McCrane XP good (KSU 31–10)

Fourth quarter

- ISU - 13:15 Joel Lanning 5 yd run, Cole Netten XP good (KSU 31–17)
- ISU - 06:55 Kane Seeley 1 yd safety (KSU 31–19)
- ISU - 00:51 D. Jones 5 yd pass from Jacob Park, Cole Netten XP good (KSU 31–26)

Top passers

- KSU – Jesse Ertz 18/28, 151 yards, 1 TD
- ISU – Jacob Park 19/35, 301 yards, 2 TD, 1 INT

Top rushers

- KSU – Jesse Ertz 9 attempts, 106 yards
- ISU – Joel Lanning 10 attempts, 74 yards, 1 TD

Top receivers

- KSU – Deante Burton 5 receptions, 72 yards, 1 TD
- ISU – Allen Lazard 8 receptions, 134 yards

Top tacklers

- KSU – D.J. Reed 14 tackles
- ISU – Kamari Cotton-Moya 9 tackles

=== Oklahoma State ===
	1	2	3	4	Total
#22 Cowboys	7	14	7	15	43
Wildcats	13	3	14	7	37

=== At Baylor ===
	1	2	3	4	Total
Wildcats	0	7	21	14	42
Bears	0	14	0	7	21

=== Kansas ===
	1	2	3	4	Total
Jayhawks	3	0	6	10	19
Wildcats	6	14	7	7	34

=== At TCU ===
All-time record	Big 12 record	Last meeting	Result
5–4	2–2	2015	TCU, 52–45

Kansas State Wildcats at TCU Horned Frogs – Game Summary

Quarter	1	2	3	4	Total
Wildcats	3	7	13	7	30
Horned Frogs	3	3	0	0	6

at Amon G. Carter Stadium • Fort Worth, TX

- Date: December 3, 2016
- Game time: 11:00 a.m.
- Game weather: 50 degrees, Rain, Wind NE 9 mph
- Game attendance: 42,746
- Referee: Cooper Castleberry
- TV announcers: TBA (play-by-play), TBA (color), TBA (sideline)

Game information

First Quarter
Second Quarter
Third Quarter
Fourth Quarter

Top Passers

- KSU – Jesse Ertz, 9-21 159 Yards, 1 TD, 0 INT
- TCU – Foster Sawyer, 12-25, 85 Yards, 0 TD, 1 INT

Top Rushers

- KSU – Jesse Ertz, 19 Attempts, 170 Yards, 1 TD
- TCU – Kyle Hicks, 17 Attempts, 60 Yards, 0 TD

Top Receiving

- KSU – Byron Pringle, 6 Receptions, 126 Yards, 1 TD
- TCU – Deante Gray, 2 Receptions, 59 Yards, 0 TD

=== Vs. Texas A&M ===
Bowl Week: Kansas State Wildcats vs. Texas A&M Aggies – Game summary

Quarter	1	2	3	4	Total
Aggies	7	7	7	7	28
Wildcats	7	16	3	7	33

at NRG Stadium, Houston, TX

- Date: December 28
- Game time: 8:00 p.m.
- Game attendance: 68,412
- TV: ESPN

Game information

First quarter

- TAMU 11:30 – Keith Ford 7 yard run (Daniel LaCamera kick), TAMU 7–0
- KSU 4:52 – Byron Pringle 79 yard pass from Jesse Ertz (Ian Patterson kick), tied 7–7

Second quarter

- KSU 12:19 – Jesse Ertz 5 yard run (Ian Patterson PAT blocked), KSU 13–7
- TAMU 10:00 – Ricky-Seals Jones 3 yard pass from Trevor Knight (Daniel LaCamera kick), TAMU 14–13
- KSU 6:13 – Ian Patterson 40 yard field goal, KSU 16–14
- KSU 3:07 – Dominique Heath 52 yard run (Ian Patterson kick), KSU 23–14

Third quarter

- TAMU 6:55 – Josh Reynolds 4 yard pass from Trevor Knight (Daniel LaCamera kick), KSU 23–21
- KSU 2:48 – Ian Patterson 25 yard field goal, KSU 26–21

Fourth quarter

- KSU 9:00 – Jesse Ertz 1 yard run (Ian Patterson kick), KSU 33–21
- TAMU 7:50 – Josh Reynolds 15 yard pass from Trevor Knight (Daniel LaCamera kick), KSU 33–28

Leading Passers

- KSU – Jesse Ertz 14/20, 195 yards, TD
- TAMU – Trevor Knight 30/48, 310 yards, 3 TD, INT

Leading Rushers

- KSU – Justin Silmon 10 carries, 77 yards
- TAMU – Keith Ford 10 carries, 86 yards, TD

Leading Receivers

- KSU – Byron Pringle 3 receptions, 107 yards, TD
- TAMU – Josh Reynolds 12 receptions, 154 yards, 2 TD
