= Daeshon Hall =

American football player (born 1995)

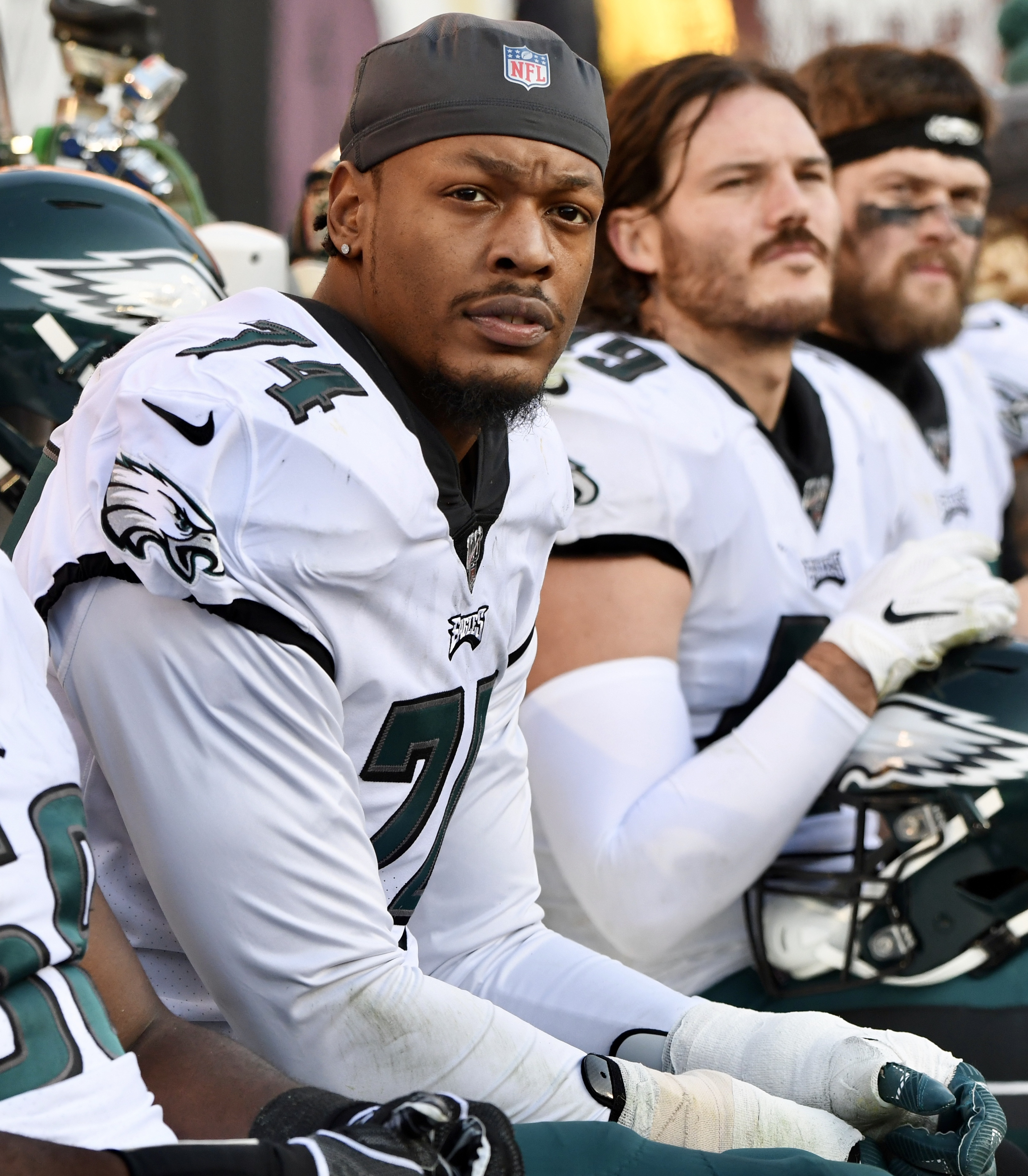
- Hall with the Philadelphia Eagles in 2019

No. 94, 74
- Position: Defensive end

Personal information
- Born: June 14, 1995 (age 31); Seattle, Washington, U.S.
- Listed height: 6 ft 5 in (1.96 m)
- Listed weight: 265 lb (120 kg)

Career information
- High school: Lancaster (Lancaster, Texas)
- College: Texas A&M
- NFL draft: 2017: 3rd round, 77th overall pick

Career history
- Carolina Panthers (2017); San Francisco 49ers (2018)*; Houston Texans (2018); Philadelphia Eagles (2018–2020); New York Jets (2020); San Francisco 49ers (2020–2021)*; Miami Dolphins (2022)*
- * Offseason or practice squad member only

Career NFL statistics
- Total tackles: 9
- Sacks: 1.5
- Stats at Pro Football Reference

Daeshon Hall (born June 14, 1995) is an American former professional football player who was a defensive end in the National Football League (NFL). He played college football for the Texas A&M Aggies.

== Early life ==
Hall attended Garfield High School in Seattle, Washington and Lancaster High School in Lancaster, Texas. As a senior he had 83 tackles and 23 sacks.

== College career ==
Hall played at the Texas A&M University from 2013 to 2016. During his career, he had 158 tackles and 14 sacks.

== Professional career ==
Pre-draft measurables
Height	Weight	Arm length	Hand span	40-yard dash	10-yard split	20-yard split	20-yard shuttle	Three-cone drill	Vertical jump	Broad jump	Bench press
6 ft 5 1/4 in (1.96 m)	266 lb (121 kg)	35 in (0.89 m)	9 5/8 in (0.24 m)	4.76 s	1.66 s	2.76 s	4.38 s	7.03 s	36 in (0.91 m)	10 ft 3 in (3.12 m)	18 reps
All values from NFL Combine

=== Carolina Panthers ===
Hall was selected by the Carolina Panthers in the third round, 77th overall, in the 2017 NFL draft. He was placed on injured reserve on October 6, 2017.

On September 1, 2018, Hall was waived by the Panthers.

=== San Francisco 49ers (first stint) ===
On September 6, 2018, Hall was signed to the practice squad of the San Francisco 49ers.

=== Houston Texans ===
On September 25, 2018, Hall was signed by the Houston Texans off the 49ers' practice squad. He was waived on October 20, 2018 and re-signed to the practice squad.

=== Philadelphia Eagles ===
On December 11, 2018, Hall was signed by the Philadelphia Eagles off the Texans practice squad.

In Week 17 of the 2019 season, Hall suffered a torn ACL on the final play of the game, and was placed on injured reserve on December 31, 2019. He was waived with a failed physical designation on July 26, 2020, and subsequently reverted to the team's reserve/physically unable to perform (PUP) list after clearing waivers the next day. He was waived from the PUP list on October 23.

=== New York Jets ===
On October 26, 2020, Hall was claimed off waivers by the New York Jets, but was waived four days later after failing his physical.

=== San Francisco 49ers (second stint) ===
On December 16, 2020, Hall was signed to the 49ers practice squad. He signed a reserve/future contract on January 4, 2021. He was released on July 26, 2021.

=== Miami Dolphins ===
On February 18, 2022, Hall signed with the Miami Dolphins. He was released on June 8, 2022.
