= Byron Pringle =

American football player (born 1993)

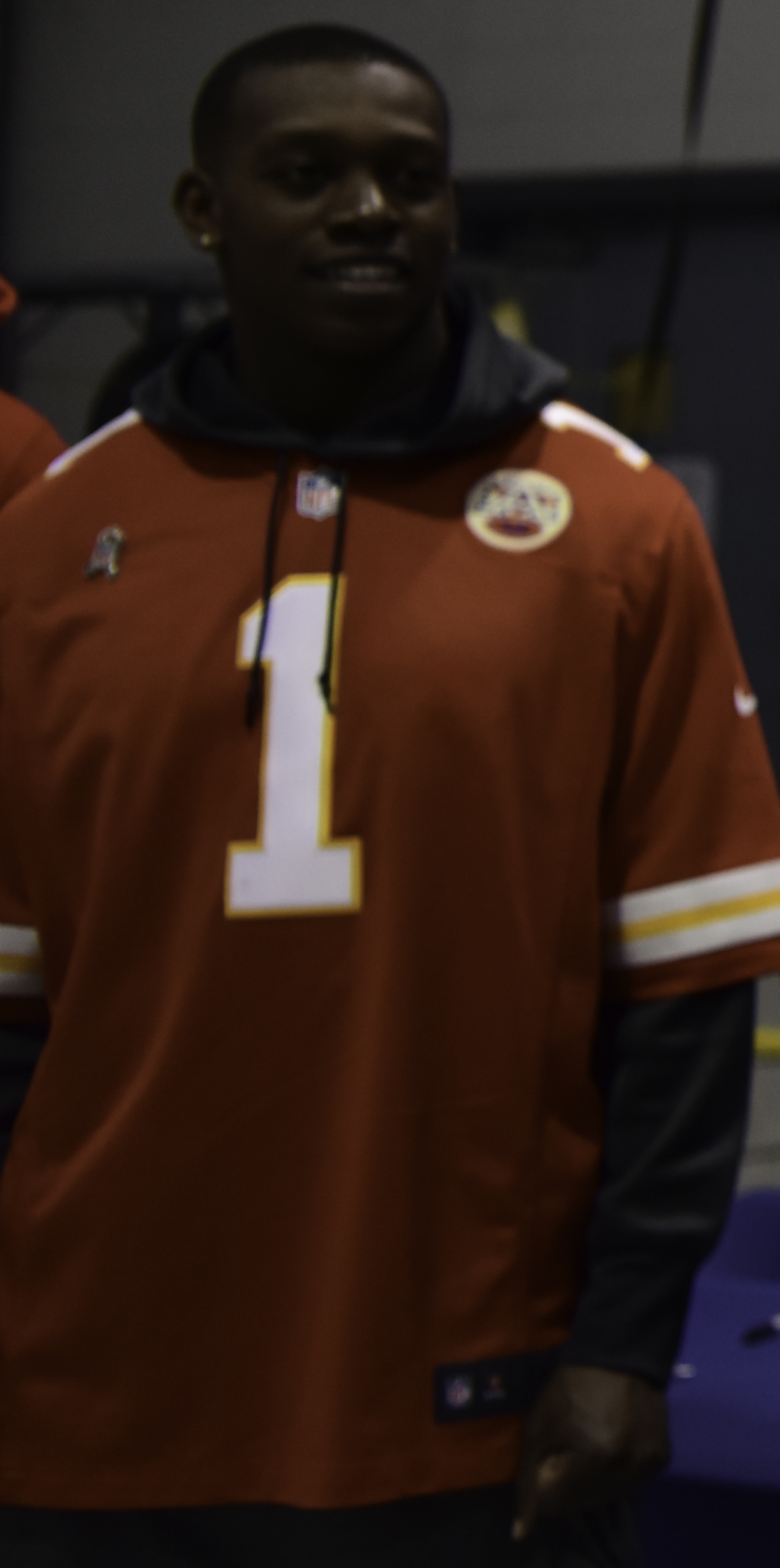
- Pringle with the Kansas City Chiefs in 2018

Profile
- Position: Wide receiver

Personal information
- Born: November 17, 1993 (age 33); Tampa, Florida, U.S.
- Listed height: 6 ft 1 in (1.85 m)
- Listed weight: 203 lb (92 kg)

Career information
- High school: Robinson (Tampa)
- College: Butler CC (2015) Kansas State (2016–2017)
- NFL draft: 2018: undrafted

Career history
- Kansas City Chiefs (2018–2021); Chicago Bears (2022); Washington Commanders (2023)

Awards and highlights
- Super Bowl champion (LIV); First-team All-Big 12 (2016)

Career NFL statistics
- Receptions: 91
- Receiving yards: 1,194
- Receiving touchdowns: 9
- Return yards: 1,237
- Return touchdowns: 1
- Stats at Pro Football Reference

Byron Pringle (born November 17, 1993) is an American former professional football wide receiver. He played college football at Butler Community College and for the Kansas State Wildcats. He signed as an undrafted free agent with the Kansas City Chiefs in 2018, with whom he won Super Bowl LIV. Pringle has also played for the Chicago Bears and Washington Commanders.

== Professional career ==
Pre-draft measurables
Height	Weight	Arm length	Hand span	40-yard dash	10-yard split	20-yard split	20-yard shuttle	Three-cone drill	Vertical jump	Broad jump	Bench press
6 ft 1 1/8 in (1.86 m)	203 lb (92 kg)	32 in (0.81 m)	9 1/4 in (0.23 m)	4.46 s	1.56 s	2.61 s	4.40 s	6.87 s	33.5 in (0.85 m)	10 ft 0 in (3.05 m)	15 reps
All values from NFL Combine

=== Kansas City Chiefs ===
==== 2018 ====
Pringle signed with the Kansas City Chiefs as an undrafted free agent in 2018. Following an injury in the Chiefs' final preseason game of the 2018 season, he was placed on injured reserve on September 1.

==== 2019 ====
After making the Chiefs' initial 53-man roster, Pringle was waived on September 10, 2019, and re-signed to the practice squad. He was elevated to the active roster on September 14. On Sunday Night Football against the Indianapolis Colts in Week 5, he finished with 103 receiving yards and a touchdown as the Chiefs lost 13–19. Pringle was on the winning side when Kansas City defeated the San Francisco 49ers 31–20 in Super Bowl LIV.

==== 2020 ====
Pringle had his first career kickoff return touchdown in Week 7, with a 102 yard return against the Denver Broncos in a 43–16 victory, earning AFC Special Teams Player of the Week. He was placed on injured reserve on November 24, 2020, after suffering an ankle injury in Week 11. He was activated on December 19. He finished the 2020 season with 13 receptions for 160 receiving yards and 1 touchdown. In Super Bowl LV, he received Mahomes' first completion of the game for three yards. However, he was only targeted once more in the 31–9 loss to the Tampa Bay Buccaneers.

==== 2021 ====
The Chiefs placed a restricted free agent tender on Pringle on March 17, 2021. He signed his tender on April 29. Pringle served as a rotational wide receiver and kick returner for the Chiefs, totaling 42 receptions for 568 yards and five touchdowns during the 2021 regular season.

In the Wild Card Round against the Pittsburgh Steelers, Pringle had five receptions for 37 yards and two touchdowns in the 42–21 victory. In the Divisional Round against the Buffalo Bills, he had five receptions for 29 yards and a touchdown in the 42–36 overtime victory.

=== Chicago Bears ===
Pringle signed a one-year contract with the Chicago Bears on March 20, 2022. He was placed on injured reserve on September 27. Pringle was activated on November 12 and played the rest of the season. He finished the 2022 season with ten receptions for 135 yards and two touchdowns.

=== Washington Commanders ===
On July 25, 2023, Pringle signed a one–year contract with the Washington Commanders. He had 14 receptions for 161 yards in the 2023 season. He re-signed with the team on July 31, 2024, and was released on September 6.

== Personal life ==
In April 2022, Pringle was arrested for reckless driving and driving on a suspended license.
