= 2016 Tulane Green Wave football team =

American college football season

2016 Tulane Green Wave football
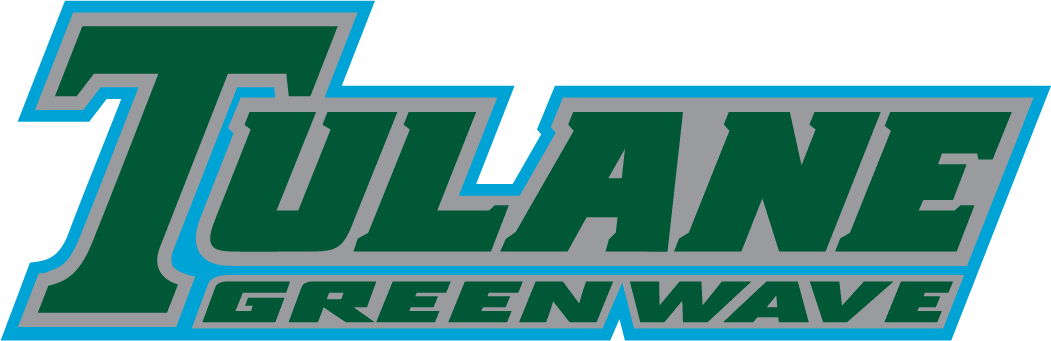
- Conference: American Athletic Conference
- West Division
- Record: 4–8 (1–7 The American)
- Head coach: Willie Fritz (1st season)
- Offensive coordinator: Doug Ruse (1st season)
- Offensive scheme: Spread option
- Defensive coordinator: Jack Curtis (1st season)
- Base defense: 4–2–5
- Home stadium: Yulman Stadium

2016 American Athletic Conference football standings
	Conf.			Overall
Team	W		L	W		L
East Division
Temple xy$	7	–	1	10	–	4
No. 19 South Florida x	7	–	1	11	–	2
UCF	4	–	4	6	–	7
Cincinnati	1	–	7	4	–	8
UConn	1	–	7	3	–	9
East Carolina	1	–	7	3	–	9
West Division
Navy xy	7	–	1	9	–	5
Tulsa	6	–	2	10	–	3
Memphis	5	–	3	8	–	5
Houston	5	–	3	9	–	4
SMU	3	–	5	5	–	7
Tulane	1	–	7	4	–	8
Championship: Temple 34, Navy 10
$ – Conference champion; x – Division champion/co-champions; y – Championship game participant; Rankings from AP Poll

The 2016 Tulane Green Wave football team represented Tulane University in the 2016 NCAA Division I FBS football season. The Green Wave played their home games at Yulman Stadium in New Orleans, Louisiana, and competed in the West Division of American Athletic Conference (AAC). They were led by first-year head coach Willie Fritz. They finished the season 4–8, 1–7 in American Athletic play to finish in last place in the West Division.

== Schedule ==
Tulane announced its 2016 football schedule on February 9, 2016. The 2016 schedule consisted of 6 home and away games in the regular season. The Green Wave hosted AAC foes Memphis, Navy, SMU, and Temple, and traveled to UCF, UConn, Houston, and Tulsa.

The team played four non–conference games, two of which were home games against Louisiana–Lafayette from the Sun Belt Conference and Southern from the Southwestern Athletic Conference, and two road game against UMass and traveled to Wake Forest from the Atlantic Coast Conference.

Date	Time	Opponent	Site	TV	Result	Attendance
September 1	6:00 pm	at Wake Forest*	BB&T Field; Winston-Salem, NC	ESPN3	L 3–7	24,398
September 10	7:00 pm	Southern*	Yulman Stadium; New Orleans, LA	ESPN3	W 66–21	27,179
September 17	6:00 pm	Navy	Yulman Stadium; New Orleans, LA	ASN	L 14–21	21,503
September 24	7:00 pm	Louisiana–Lafayette*	Yulman Stadium; New Orleans, LA	ESPN3	W 41–39 ^{4OT}	24,253
October 1	2:30 pm	at UMass*	Warren McGuirk Alumni Stadium; Hadley, MA	ASN	W 31–24	14,892
October 14	7:00 pm	Memphis	Yulman Stadium; New Orleans, LA	ESPNU	L 14–24	21,098
October 22	2:45 pm	at Tulsa	Chapman Stadium; Tulsa, OK	ESPNU	L 27–50	22,349
October 29	3:00 pm	SMU^{†}	Yulman Stadium; New Orleans, LA	ESPNews	L 31–35	25,780
November 5^{[a]}	5:00 pm	at UCF	Bright House Networks Stadium; Orlando, FL	ESPN3	L 6–37	31,571
November 12	2:30 pm	at Houston	TDECU Stadium; Houston, TX	CBSSN	L 18–30	36,552
November 19	2:30 pm	Temple	Yulman Stadium; New Orleans, LA	ASN	L 0–31	16,497
November 26	3:00 pm	at UConn	Rentschler Field; East Hartford, CT	ESPNews	W 38–13	20,764
*Non-conference game; ^{†}Homecoming; All times are in Central time

^{^[a]}The game between Tulane and UCF on October 7, 2016, was postponed due to Hurricane Matthew. The game was rescheduled for the following month on November 5, 2016, with the kickoff time to be announced.
Schedule source:

== Game summaries ==
=== Wake Forest ===
Week 1: Tulane Green Wave at Wake Forest Demon Deacons – Game Summary

Quarter	1	2	3	4	Total
Tulane	3	0	0	0	3
Wake Forest	0	7	0	0	7

at BB&T Field • Winston-Salem, North Carolina

- Date: September 1, 2016
- Game time: 7:00 p.m. EDT
- Game attendance: 24,398
- TV announcers (ESPN3): Taylor Zarzour and Al Groh

=== Southern ===
Week 2: Southern Jaguars at Tulane Green Wave – Game Summary

Quarter	1	2	3	4	Total
Southern	7	0	14	0	21
Tulane	28	21	7	10	66

at Yulman Stadium • New Orleans, Louisiana

- Date: September 10, 2016
- Game time: 7:00 p.m. CDT
- Game attendance: 27,179
- TV announcers (ESPN3): Joel Meyers and Brian Kinchen

=== Navy ===
Week 3: Navy Midshipmen at Tulane Green Wave – Game Summary

Quarter	1	2	3	4	Total
Navy	0	7	6	8	21
Tulane	0	7	7	0	14

at Yulman Stadium • New Orleans, Louisiana

- Date: September 17, 2016
- Game time: 6:00 p.m. CDT
- Game attendance: 21,503
- TV announcers (ASN): Mike Gleason, Derrick Lewis, and Kathryn Pielech

=== Louisiana–Lafayette ===
Week 4: Louisiana-Lafayette Ragin' Cajuns at Tulane Green Wave – Game Summary

Quarter	1	2	3	4	OT	2OT	3OT	4OT	Total
UL-Lafayette	3	3	3	7	7	7	3	6	39
Tulane	0	6	10	0	7	7	3	8	41

at Yulman Stadium • New Orleans, Louisiana

- Date: September 24, 2016
- Game time: 7:00 p.m. CDT
- Game attendance: 24,253
- TV announcers (ESPN3): Joel Meyers and Chad Brown

=== Massachusetts ===
Week 5: Tulane Green Wave at Massachusetts Minutemen – Game Summary

Quarter	1	2	3	4	Total
Tulane	7	3	14	7	31
UMass	14	0	0	10	24

at Warren McGuirk Alumni Stadium • Hadley, Massachusetts

- Date: October 1, 2016
- Game time: 3:30 p.m. EDT
- TV announcers (ESPN3/ASN): Eric Frede and Andy Gresh

=== Memphis ===
Week 7: Memphis Tigers at Tulane Green Wave – Game Summary

Quarter	1	2	3	4	Total
Memphis	3	10	3	8	24
Tulane	0	7	0	7	14

at Yulman Stadium • New Orleans, Louisiana

- Date: October 14, 2016
- Game time: 7:00 p.m. CDT
- TV announcers (ESPNU): Roy Philpott and Charles Arbuckle

=== Tulsa ===
Week 8: Tulane Green Wave at Tulsa Golden Hurricane – Game Summary

Quarter	1	2	3	4	Total
Tulane	7	0	13	7	27
Tulsa	14	17	9	10	50

at Chapman Stadium • Tulsa, Oklahoma

- Date: October 22, 2016
- Game time: 2:45 p.m. CDT
- Game attendance: 22,349
- TV announcers (ESPNU): Eamon McAnaney and John Congemi

=== SMU ===
Week 9 (homecoming): SMU Mustangs at Tulane Green Wave – Game Summary

Quarter	1	2	3	4	Total
SMU	14	7	0	14	35
Tulane	7	3	14	7	31

at Yulman Stadium • New Orleans, Louisiana

- Date: October 29, 2016
- Game time: 3:00 p.m. CDT
- Game attendance: 25,780
- TV announcers (ESPNews): Dave LaMont and Brian Kinchen

=== UCF ===
Week 6: Tulane Green Wave at UCF Knights – Game Summary

Quarter	1	2	3	4	Total
Tulane	6	0	0	0	6
UCF	0	7	13	17	37

at Bright House Networks Stadium • Orlando, Florida

- Date: November 5, 2016
- Game time: 4:00 p.m. EDT
- TV announcers (ESPN3): Alex Faust and Forrest Conoly

The game, originally scheduled for a 7:30 pm kickoff on October 6 to be televised on ESPNU, was moved to November 5 due to Hurricane Matthew. The game was moved to November 5 because both teams, coincidentally, had scheduled bye weeks for that week.

=== Houston ===
Week 11: Tulane Green Wave at Houston Cougars – Game Summary

Quarter	1	2	3	4	Total
Tulane	7	3	0	8	18
Houston	14	14	0	2	30

at TDECU Stadium • Houston, Texas

- Date: November 12, 2016
- Game time: 2:30 p.m. CST
- Game attendance: 36,552
- TV announcers (CBSSN): Dave Ryan, Corey Chavous, and Melanie Collins

=== Temple ===
Week 12: Temple Owls at Tulane Green Wave – Game Summary

Quarter	1	2	3	4	Total
Temple	7	3	14	7	31
Tulane	0	0	0	0	0

at Yulman Stadium • New Orleans, Louisiana

- Date: November 19, 2016
- Game time: 2:30pm CST
- Game attendance: 16,497
- TV announcers (ESPN3/ASN): Jeff McCarragher and Michael Young

=== UConn ===
Week 13: Tulane Green Wave at UConn Huskies – Game Summary

Quarter	1	2	3	4	Total
Tulane	10	14	0	14	38
UConn	0	0	6	7	13

at Rentschler Field • East Hartford, Connecticut

- Date: November 26, 2016
- Game time: 4:00 p.m. EST
- TV announcers (ESPN3/ESPNews): Chris Hassel and Matt Chatham

== Roster ==
2016 Tulane Green Wave football team roster
Players
Coaches
Offense

Pos.	#	Name	Class
QB	1	Johnathan Brantley	Fr
RB	3	Sherman Badie	RJr
WR	5	Terren Encalade	RSo
WR	7	Devin Glenn	So
WR	8	Devon Breaux	RSr
WR	9	Chris Johnson	Fr
QB	10	P.J. Hurst	Fr
QB	11	Darius Bradwell	Fr
WR	13	Rocky Ferony	Fr
WR	13	Brian Newman	Jr
QB	14	Glen Cuiellette	RSo
WR	15	Jacob Robertson Jr.	Fr
TE	22	Marshall Wadleigh	Sr
RB	25	Josh Rounds	RSr
RB	26	Dontrell Hilliard	Jr
RB	27	Andrew Zuckerman	Fr
RB	29	Jared Bertrand	So
WR	30	Tristan Cooper	RJr
RB	31	Miles Strickland	Fr
RB	33	Lazedrick Thompson	RSr
TE	46	Sergio Medina	RJr
OL	50	Tyler Johnson	Fr
C	51	Junior Diaz	RSo
C	53	Keyshawn McLeod	RFr
G	58	Brian Webb	RFr
OL	66	Phabion Woodard	Fr
G	71	Jason Stewart	RJr
OT	72	John Leglue	RSo
OL	73	Leeward Brown	RFr
OT	74	Devon Johnson	RSo
G	75	Chris Taylor	Sr
OT	78	Todd Jacquet	RSr
G	79	Kenneth Santa Marina	RJr
WR	80	Andrew Hicks	So
WR	81	D.J. Owens	Fr
WR	82	Reed Green	So
WR	83	Trey Scott	Jr
TE	84	Charles Jones II	Jr
WR	85	Larry Dace III	RSr
WR	86	Darnell Mooney	Fr
TE	89	Kendall Ardoin	RSo

Defense

Pos.	#	Name	Class
LB	2	Nico Marley	Sr
S	4	Will Harper	Fr
S	6	Jarrod Franklin	RJr
DB	11	Tre Jackson	Fr
DB	12	Sean Harper	Fr
LB	13	William Townsend	RJr
DB	16	P.J. Hall	Fr
CB	17	Parry Nickerson	RJr
NB	19	Taris Shenall	So
DB	20	Chase Napoleon	Fr
CB	21	Donnie Lewis Jr.	RSo
NB	23	Richard Allen	Sr
DB	24	Eric Lewis	Fr
CB	27	John Helow	Fr
DL	28	Deion Rainey	Fr
CB	32	Stephon Lofton	RSo
CB	34	Jeremie Francis	RFr
LB	35	Lawrence Graham	Fr
LB	36	Larry Bryant	Fr
DB	37	Thakarius Keyes	Fr
S	38	Roderic Teamer	So
S	39	Sam Davis	So
LB	40	Zachery Harris	RSo
DE	44	Luke Jackson	RJr
DL	48	De'Andre Williams	Fr
LB	52	Eric Thomas	Sr
DE	54	Quinlan Carroll	RJr
LB	55	Eric Bowie	RSo
LB	56	Rae Juan Marbley	Jr
DE	57	Peter Woullard	RSo
LB	59	Sterling Fitzwater	RSo
LB	63	Casey Spinelli	Sr
DT	65	Braynon Edwards	RSo
DT	77	Tanzel Smart	Sr
DE	87	Ade Aruna	RJr
DE	90	Robert Kennedy	RSo
DT	91	Eldrick Washington	RSo
DE	92	Daren Williams	Jr
DT	93	John Washington	RFr
DT	94	Sean Wilson	Jr
DT	95	Paul Staudinger	Jr
DT	98	Eric Bell	RJr

Special teams

Pos.	#	Name	Class
P	41	Enrique Carrasquero	So
K	42	Andrew DiRocco	Jr
P	43	Coby Neenan	Fr
K	45	Randy Harvey	So
P	49	Zachary Block	So
LS	60	Geron Eatherly	Fr
LS	96	Aaron Golub	Jr

Head coach

- Willie Fritz

Coordinators/assistant coaches

- Alex Atkins – Assistant Head Coach/Offensive Line Coach
- Jack Curtis – Defensive Coordinator/Safeties Coach
- Doug Ruse – Offensive Coordinator/Quarterbacks Coach
- Jeff Conway – Wide Receivers Coach
- Chris Hampton – Secondary Coach
- Slade Nagle – Tight Ends Coach
- Jamaal Fobbs – Running Backs Coach
- Kevin Peoples – Defensive Line Coach
- Michael Mutz – Linebackers Coach
- Chris Couch – Special Teams Analyst/Recruiting
- Derrick Sherman – Offensive Analyst/Recruiting
- Johnny Jernigan – Defensive Analyst/Recruiting
- Shane Meyer – Director of Football Operations
- Wes Fritz – Director of Player Personnel
- Donn Landholm – Director of Player Development
- Walker Ashburn – Graduate Assistant Coach-Defense
- Jordy Joseph – Graduate Assistant-Offense
- Brandon Bailey – Graduate Assistant-Defense
- Jake Stone – Graduate Assistant for Recruiting Operations
- Liz Devlin-Ziegler – Senior Program Manager
- Arielle Burks – Program Coordinator
- Kyle Speer – Director of Strength and Conditioning (Head Football)

Legend

- (C) Team captain
- (S) Suspended
- (I) Ineligible
- Injured
- Redshirt

Roster
