= 2016 American Athletic Conference Football Championship Game =

- Conference Championship
- Logo of the Championship Game
Temple Owls	Navy Midshipmen
(9–3)	(9–2)
34	10
Head coach: Matt Rhule	Head coach: Ken Niumatalolo
	AP / Coaches / CFP; 20 / 20 / 19
	1	2	3	4	Total
Temple	14	10	0	10	34
Navy	0	3	7	0	10
- Date: December 3, 2016
- Season: 2016
- Stadium: Navy–Marine Corps Memorial Stadium
- Location: Annapolis, Maryland
- MVP: P. J. Walker (QB, Temple)
- Favorite: Navy by 2
- Referee: Michael Roche
- Attendance: 22,815

United States TV coverage
- Network: ABC/IMG
- Announcers: Joe Tessitore, Todd Blackledge, and Holly Rowe (ABC); Tony Castricone and Tony Pike (IMG)

2016 American Athletic Conference football standings
	Conf.			Overall
Team	W		L	W		L
East Division
Temple xy$	7	–	1	10	–	4
No. 19 South Florida x	7	–	1	11	–	2
UCF	4	–	4	6	–	7
Cincinnati	1	–	7	4	–	8
UConn	1	–	7	3	–	9
East Carolina	1	–	7	3	–	9
West Division
Navy xy	7	–	1	9	–	5
Tulsa	6	–	2	10	–	3
Memphis	5	–	3	8	–	5
Houston	5	–	3	9	–	4
SMU	3	–	5	5	–	7
Tulane	1	–	7	4	–	8
Championship: Temple 34, Navy 10
$ – Conference champion; x – Division champion/co-champions; y – Championship game participant; Rankings from AP Poll

The 2016 American Athletic Conference Football Championship Game, held on Saturday, December 3, 2016, was the second football championship game for that conference. Houston defeated Temple, 24–13, in last year's game.

== Teams ==
=== Navy ===
The Navy Midshipmen football team is a member of the American Athletic Conference in its West Division. They represented the West Division in the American Athletic Conference Championship Game.

Navy hosted the title game. Since Navy and Temple both finished 7–1 in American play and did not play during the regular season, the next tiebreaker used to determine the home team was College Football Playoff (CFP) ranking. Under American Conference rules, if one or both division champions enter the final week of conference play in the CFP rankings, the higher-ranked team will host, provided that it wins its game that week. Since Navy entered its conference finale against SMU at #25 in the CFP rankings, and won that game 75–31, the Midshipmen earned hosting rights. This was Navy's first ever conference championship appearance.

=== Temple ===
The Temple Owls went 7–1 in American Athletic Conference play, finishing 1st in the East Division for the second straight year. Due to their win over South Florida, they represented the East Division in the American Athletic Conference Championship Game. This was their second straight conference championship appearance. They were attempting to earn their first conference title since 1967, when the Owls were in the Middle Atlantic Conference.

== Game summary ==
Scoring summary

Quarter	Time	Drive			Team	Scoring information	Score	
Quarter	Time	Plays	Yards	TOP	Team	Scoring information	Temple	Navy
1	9:43	12	75	5:17	Temple	Jahad Thomas 15-yard touchdown run, Aaron Boumerhi kick good	7	0
1	3:01	6	59	3:17	Temple	Ventell Bryant 22-yard touchdown reception from Phillip Walker, Aaron Boumerhi kick good	14	0
2	13:44	5	70	2:07	Temple	Keith Kirkwood 56-yard touchdown reception from Phillip Walker, Aaron Boumerhi kick good	21	0
2	5:12	10	68	5:45	Navy	23-yard field goal by Bennett Moehring	21	3
2	0:22	5	20	0:29	Temple	48-yard field goal by Aaron Boumerhi	24	3
3	2:18	7	64	3:03	Navy	Zach Abey 1-yard touchdown run, Bennett Moehring kick good	24	10
4	10:17	12	40	7:01	Temple	42-yard field goal by Aaron Boumerhi	27	10
4	3:04	2	34	0:48	Temple	Ryquell Armstead 30-yard touchdown run, Aaron Boumerhi kick good	34	10
"TOP" = time of possession. For other American football terms, see Glossary of American football.							34	10

=== Statistics ===
Statistics	Temple	Navy
First downs	18	13
Plays–yards	61–388	59–306
Rushes–yards	36–189	44–168
Passing yards	199	138
Passing: Comp–Att–Int	16–25–0	8–15–2
Time of possession	30:38	29:22
