= Ryquell Armstead =

American gridiron football player (born 1996)

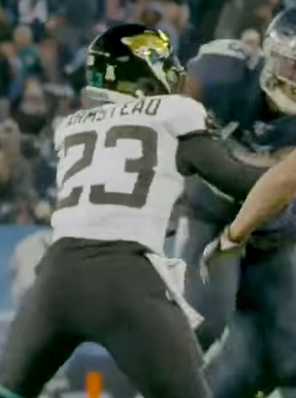
- Armstead with the Jacksonville Jaguars in 2019

Profile
- Position: Running back

Personal information
- Born: October 30, 1996 (age 30); Bridgeton, New Jersey, U.S.
- Listed height: 5 ft 11 in (1.80 m)
- Listed weight: 220 lb (100 kg)

Career information
- High school: Millville (Millville, New Jersey)
- College: Temple (2015–2018)
- NFL draft: 2019: 5th round, 140th overall pick

Career history
- Jacksonville Jaguars (2019–2020); New York Giants (2021)*; New Orleans Saints (2021)*; Green Bay Packers (2021)*; Jacksonville Jaguars (2021); DC Defenders (2023); Ottawa Redblacks (2023–2024); Saskatchewan Roughriders (2024)
- * Offseason or practice squad member only

Awards and highlights
- First team All-AAC (2018)

Career NFL statistics
- Rushing yards: 188
- Rushing average: 3.8
- Receptions: 17
- Receiving yards: 160
- Receiving touchdowns: 2
- Stats at Pro Football Reference
- Stats at CFL.ca

Ryquell Keeman Armstead (born October 30, 1996) is an American professional football running back. He played college football at Temple and was drafted by the Jacksonville Jaguars in the fifth round of the 2019 NFL draft.

== Early life ==
Armstead was born in Bridgeton, New Jersey, and grew up in Millville, New Jersey. He rushed for 1,488 yards and 18 touchdowns as a senior at Millville Senior High School, including a school-record 337 yards against Absegami High School.

== College career ==
Armstead played four seasons for the Temple Owls. Armstead spent his first two seasons as a backup to starter Jahad Thomas and rushed for 191 yards and two touchdowns as a freshman. He received significantly more playing time as a sophomore and rushed for 919 yards on 156 carries and a team-leading 14 touchdowns as the Owls went on to win the American Athletic Conference (AAC) championship. Armstead struggled with injuries in his first year as a starter, rushing for 604 yards and five touchdowns. As a senior, Armstead rushed for 1,098 yards on 210 carries (5.2 average) and scored 13 touchdowns. He was named first team All-AAC despite nagging injuries. Armstead finished his collegiate career as the Owls' fourth-leading rusher with 2,812 yards and fourth in school history with 34 rushing touchdowns.

=== College statistics ===
		Rushing					Receiving			
Year	Team	Att	Yds	Avg	Lng	TD	Rec	Yds	Avg	TD
2015	Temple	51	191	3.7	16	2	2	7	3.5	0
2016	Temple	156	919	5.9	76	14	5	41	8.2	0
2017	Temple	156	604	3.9	56	5	14	75	5.4	0
2018	Temple	210	1,098	5.2	75	13	8	52	6.5	0
Career		573	2,812	4.9	76	34	29	175	6.0	0

== Professional career ==
Pre-draft measurables
Height	Weight	Arm length	Hand span	40-yard dash	10-yard split	20-yard split	20-yard shuttle	Three-cone drill	Vertical jump	Broad jump	Bench press
5 ft 11 1/4 in (1.81 m)	220 lb (100 kg)	30 5/8 in (0.78 m)	9 1/8 in (0.23 m)	4.45 s	1.53 s	2.61 s	4.29 s	7.02 s	30.0 in (0.76 m)	9 ft 6 in (2.90 m)	22 reps
All values from NFL Combine

=== Jacksonville Jaguars (first stint) ===
Armstead was drafted by the Jacksonville Jaguars in the fifth round with the 140th overall pick in the 2019 NFL draft. Armstead signed a rookie contract with the Jaguars on May 9, 2019. Armstead made his NFL debut in the Jaguars season opener on September 8, 2019, gaining seven yards on a single carry in a 40–26 loss to the Kansas City Chiefs.

Armstead scored his first career touchdown, a seven-yard reception (also the first of his career) from Gardner Minshew, on September 29, 2019, against the Denver Broncos. Armstead finished his rookie season with 35 carries for 108 rushing yards and 14 receptions for 144 receiving yards and two receiving touchdowns.

Armstead was placed on the reserve/COVID-19 list by the team on August 2, 2020. He was activated on August 20. He was placed back on the COVID-19 list on September 4, 2020. On October 25, 2020, it was reported that he would miss the rest of the season due to COVID-19 and that he had been hospitalized twice having significant respiratory issues. He was waived after the season on May 17, 2021.

=== New York Giants ===
On May 18, 2021, Armstead was claimed off waivers by the New York Giants. He was waived on June 24.

=== New Orleans Saints ===
On October 6, 2021, Armstead was signed to the practice squad of the New Orleans Saints. On October 28, 2021, Armstead was waived by the Saints.

=== Green Bay Packers ===
On November 3, 2021, Armstead was signed to the Green Bay Packers practice squad.

=== Jacksonville Jaguars (second stint) ===
On December 22, 2021, Armstead was signed to the active roster of the Jaguars. He was waived on August 29, 2022.

=== DC Defenders ===
On November 17, 2022, Armstead was drafted by the DC Defenders of the XFL. He played in 8 games, rushing for 218 yards before being released on April 20, 2023.

=== Ottawa Redblacks ===
On June 30, 2023, Armstead signed with the Ottawa Redblacks of the Canadian Football League. In 2024, he played in 11 regular season games, where he recorded 625 rushing yards and 284 receiving yards and scored three touchdowns prior to his in-season release on September 3, 2024.

=== Saskatchewan Roughriders ===
On September 16, 2024, Armstead signed with the Saskatchewan Roughriders along with linebacker Braxton Hill. Armstead rushed for 207 yards on 25 carries in his Riders debut on September 20. He was released by the Riders on April 25, 2025.
