= 2016 SMU Mustangs football team =

American college football season

2016 SMU Mustangs football
- Conference: American Athletic Conference
- West Division
- Record: 5–7 (3–5 The American)
- Head coach: Chad Morris (2nd season)
- Offensive coordinator: Joe Craddock (2nd season)
- Offensive scheme: Power spread
- Defensive coordinator: Van Malone (2nd season)
- Base defense: 4–2–5
- Home stadium: Gerald J. Ford Stadium

2016 American Athletic Conference football standings
	Conf.			Overall
Team	W		L	W		L
East Division
Temple xy$	7	–	1	10	–	4
No. 19 South Florida x	7	–	1	11	–	2
UCF	4	–	4	6	–	7
Cincinnati	1	–	7	4	–	8
UConn	1	–	7	3	–	9
East Carolina	1	–	7	3	–	9
West Division
Navy xy	7	–	1	9	–	5
Tulsa	6	–	2	10	–	3
Memphis	5	–	3	8	–	5
Houston	5	–	3	9	–	4
SMU	3	–	5	5	–	7
Tulane	1	–	7	4	–	8
Championship: Temple 34, Navy 10
$ – Conference champion; x – Division champion/co-champions; y – Championship game participant; Rankings from AP Poll

The 2016 SMU Mustangs football team represented Southern Methodist University in the 2016 NCAA Division I FBS football season. The Mustangs played their home games at Gerald J. Ford Stadium in University Park, Texas, and competed in the West Division of American Athletic Conference (AAC). They were led by second-year head coach Chad Morris. They finished the season 5–7, 3–5 in American Athletic play to finish in fifth place in the West Division.

== Schedule ==
Date	Time	Opponent	Site	TV	Result	Attendance
September 3	6:00 p.m.	at North Texas*	Apogee Stadium; Denton, TX (Safeway Bowl)	ASN	W 34–21	24,718
September 10	2:30 p.m.	at No. 23 Baylor*	McLane Stadium; Waco, TX	FS1	L 13–40	45,499
September 17	6:00 p.m.	Liberty*	Gerald J. Ford Stadium; Dallas, TX	ESPN3	W 29–14	22,127
September 23	7:00 p.m.	TCU*	Gerald J. Ford Stadium; Dallas, TX (Battle for the Iron Skillet)	ESPN	L 3–33	30,987
October 1	11:00 a.m.	at Temple	Lincoln Financial Field; Philadelphia, PA	ESPNews	L 20–45	22,401
October 7	7:00 p.m.	at Tulsa	Chapman Stadium; Tulsa, OK	ESPN2	L 40–43 ^{OT}	20,089
October 22	6:00 p.m.	No. 11 Houston	Gerald J. Ford Stadium; Dallas, TX (rivalry)	ESPN2	W 38–16	32,000
October 29	3:00 p.m.	at Tulane	Yulman Stadium; New Orleans, LA	ESPNews	W 35–31	25,780
November 5	3:00 p.m.	Memphis^{†}	Gerald J. Ford Stadium; Dallas, TX	ESPNews	L 7–51	24,379
November 12	11:00 a.m.	at East Carolina	Dowdy–Ficklen Stadium; Greenville, NC	ESPNews	W 55–31	42,908
November 19	6:00 p.m.	South Florida	Gerald J. Ford Stadium; Dallas, TX	CBSSN	L 27–35	18,417
November 26	2:30 p.m.	Navy	Gerald J. Ford Stadium; Dallas, TX (Gansz Trophy)	ESPNU	L 31–75	21,283
*Non-conference game; ^{†}Homecoming; Rankings from AP Poll released prior to game; All times are in Central time

Schedule source:

== Game summaries ==
=== At North Texas ===
SMU Mustangs vs North Texas Mean Green – Game summary

Quarter	1	2	3	4	Total
SMU	17	7	10	0	34
North Texas	0	14	0	7	21

at Apogee Stadium • Denton, Texas

- Date: September 3, 2016
- Game time: 06:06 p.m. CDT
- Game weather: Temperature: 86 °F (30 °C) • Wind: 12 E • Weather: Clear
- Game attendance: 24,718
- Referee: Referee: Tracy Jones, *Umpire: Nick Pergine* Linesman: Lyndell Shelton* Line Judge: Colin Gaynor* Back Judge: Jim Downey* Field Judge: Jim Smith* Side Judge: Matt Waldron*
- TV announcers (ASN): Jeff McCarragher and N.D. Kalu

Game information

First Quarter

- SMU 13:01 Xavier Jones 49 yd run; Josh Williams XP Good (SMU 7–0)
- SMU 05:46 Josh Williams 29 yd field goal (SMU 10–0)
- SMU 00:23 Courtland Sutton 88 yd pass from Ben Hicks; Josh Williams XP Good (SMU 17–0)

Second Quarter

- UNT 11:19 Thaddeous Thompson 7 yd pass from Alec Morris; Trevor Moore XP Good (SMU 17–7)
- SMU 01:59 Courtland Sutton 46 yd pass from Matt Davis; Josh Williams XP Good (SMU 24–7)
- UNT 00:38 Kelvin Smith 25 yd pass from Alec Morris; Trevor Moore XP Good (SMU 24-14)

Third Quarter

- SMU 07:15 Coutland Sutton 4 yd pass from Matt Davis; Josh Williams XP Good (SMU 31-14)
- SMU 00:57 Michael Armstrong 22 yd field goal (SMU 34-14)

Fourth Quarter

- UNT 02:21 Jeffrey Wilson 11 yd run; Trevor Moore XP Good (SMU 34–21)

Top Passers

- SMU – Matt Davis 8/17, 155 Yds, 2 TD
- UNT – Alec Morris 24/39, 237 Yds, 2 TD

Top Rushers

- SMU – Xavier Jones 11 attempts, 117 yards, 1 TD
- UNT – Jeffrey Wilson 15 attempt, 88 yards, 1 TD

Top Receiving

- SMU – Courtland Sutton 4 receptions, 162 yards, 3 TD
- UNT – Willie Robinson 8 receptions, 73 yards

Top Tacklers

- SMU – Justin Lawler 8 tackles
- UNT – Kishawn McClain 8 tackles

=== At Baylor ===
SMU Mustangs vs Baylor Bears – Game summary

Quarter	1	2	3	4	Total
SMU	6	0	7	0	13
#23 Baylor	0	6	20	14	40

at McLane Stadium • Waco, Texas

- Date: September 10, 2016
- Game time: 02:40 p.m. CDT
- Game weather: Temperature: 85 °F (29 °C) • Wind: 12 N • Weather: Partly Cloudy
- Game attendance: 45,499
- Referee: Referee: C. Castleberry, *Umpire: Jim Adams* Linesman: Justin Gragg* Line Judge: Kelly Deterding* Back Judge: T. Castleberry* Field Judge: Scott Gaines* Side Judge: Anthony Fleming* Center Judge: Chris Tallent*
- TV announcers (FS2/FS1): Tim Brando, Spencer Tillman, and Bruce Feldman

Game information

First Quarter

- SMU 09:12 Josh Williams 29 yd field goal (SMU 3–0)
- SMU 03:39 Josh Williams 26 yd field goal (SMU 6–0)

Second Quarter

- BU 13:51 Chris Callahan 35 yd field goal (SMU 6–3)
- BU 01:15 Chris Callahan 38 yd field goal (tie 6–6)

Third Quarter

- BU 12:02 Blake Lynch 31 yd pass from Seth Russell; Chris Callahan XP Good (BU 6-13)
- BU 05:43 Seth Russell 19 yd run; Chris Callahan XP Good (BU 6-20)
- BU 04:55 Orion Stewart 33 yd interception return; Chris Callahan XP failed (BU 6-26)
- SMU 02:40 Courtland Sutton 20 yd pass from Ben Hicks; Josh Williams XP Good (BU 13-26)

Fourth Quarter

- BU 13:45 KD Cannon 32 yd pass from Seth Russell; Chris Callahan XP Good (BU 13–33)
- BU 04:16 JaMycal 4 yd run; Chris Callahan XP Good (BU 13-40)

Top Passers

- SMU – Ben Hicks 17/44, 229 Yds, 1 TD
- BU – Seth Russell 26/47, 261 Yds, 2 TD

Top Rushers

- SMU – Xavier Jones 15 attempts, 93 yards
- BU – T. Williams 19 attempt, 85 yards

Top Receiving

- SMU – James Proche 7 receptions, 84 yards
- BU – KD Cannon 10 receptions, 93 yards, 1 TD

Top Tacklers

- SMU – Darrion Millines 10 tackles
- BU – Patrick Levels 12 tackles

=== Liberty ===
Liberty Flames at SMU Mustangs – Game summary

Quarter	1	2	3	4	Total
Liberty	7	0	7	0	14
SMU	10	3	6	10	29

at Gerald J. Ford Stadium • Dallas, TX

- Date: September 17, 2016
- Game time: 6:00 p.m. CDT
- Game attendance: 22,127
- TV announcers (ESPN3): Brett Dolan and Chad Brown

=== TCU ===
TCU Horned Frogs at SMU Mustangs – Game summary

Quarter	1	2	3	4	Total
TCU	3	3	14	13	33
SMU	3	0	0	0	3

at Gerald J. Ford Stadium • Dallas, TX

- Date: September 23, 2016
- Game time: 7:00 p.m. CDT
- Game attendance: 30,987
- TV announcers (ESPN): Adam Amin, Mack Brown, and Dawn Davenport

=== At Temple ===
SMU Mustangs vs. Temple Owls – Game summary

Quarter	1	2	3	4	Total
SMU	7	7	0	6	20
Temple	21	13	3	7	44

at Lincoln Financial Field • Philadelphia, PA

- Date: October 1, 2016
- Game time: 11:00 a.m. CDT
- Game attendance: 22,401
- TV announcers (ESPNews): Mike Couzens and Dan Hawkins

=== At Tulsa ===
SMU Mustangs vs. Tulsa Hurricane – Game summary

Quarter	1	2	3	4	OT	Total
SMU	14	6	7	10	3	40
Tulsa	10	13	7	7	6	43

at Skelly Field at H. A. Chapman Stadium • Tulsa, OK

- Date: October 7, 2016
- Game time: 7:00 p.m. CDT
- Game attendance: 20,089
- TV announcers (ESPN2): Mike Corey and Rene Ingoglia

Game information

First quarter

- (13:19) SMU – Ke'Mon Freeman 2-yard run; Josh Williams XP Good (SMU 7–0)
- (5:21) TU – Redford Jones 24-yard field goal (SMU 7–3)
- (3:20) SMU – Alex Honey 45-yard pass from Ben Hicks; Josh Williams XP Good (SMU 14–3)
- (3:02) TU – James Flanders 61-yard run; Redford Jones XP Good (SMU 14–10)

Second quarter

- (14:51) SMU – Josh Williams 39-yard field goal (SMU 17–10)
- (9:49) TU – Redford Jones 43-yard field goal (SMU 17–13)
- (5:57) SMU – Josh Williams 44-yard field goal (SMU 20–13)
- (3:48) TU – Redford Jones 33-yard field goal (SMU 20–16)
- (1:07) TU – Raymond Taylor 2-yard run; Redford Jones XP Good (TU 23–20)

Third quarter

- (13:58) SMU – Jeremiah Gaines 19-yard pass from Ben Hicks; Josh Williams XP Good (SMU 27–23)
- (10:50) TU – Josh Atkinson 11-yard pass from Dane Evans; Redford Jones XP Good (TU 30–27)

Fourth quarter

- (8:31) SMU – Braeden West 4-yard run; Josh Williams XP Good (SMU 34–30)
- (5:32) TU – D'Angelo Brewer 35-yard run; Redford Jones XP Good (TU 37–34)
- (0:00) SMU – Josh Williams 25-yard field goal (TIED 37–37)

Overtime

- SMU – Josh Williams 22-yard field goal (SMU 40–37)
- TU – Dane Evans 14-yard run (TU 43–40)

=== Houston ===
#11 Houston Cougars at SMU Mustangs – Game summary

Quarter	1	2	3	4	Total
#11 Houston	0	7	7	2	16
SMU	7	21	0	10	38

at Gerald J. Ford Stadium • Dallas, TX

- Date: October 22, 2016
- Game time: 6:00 p.m. CDT
- Game attendance: 32,000
- TV announcers (ESPN2): Jason Benetti, Kelly Stouffer, and Paul Carcaterra

=== At Tulane ===
SMU Mustangs vs. Tulane Green Wave – Game summary

Quarter	1	2	3	4	Total
SMU	14	7	0	14	35
Tulane	7	3	14	7	31

at Yulman Stadium • New Orleans, LA

- Date: October 29, 2016
- Game time: 3:00 p.m. CDT
- Game attendance: 25,780
- TV announcers (ESPNews): Dave LaMont and Brian Kinchen

=== Memphis ===
Memphis Tigers at SMU Mustangs – Game summary

Quarter	1	2	3	4	Total
Memphis	21	17	13	0	51
SMU	7	0	0	0	7

at Gerald J. Ford Stadium • Dallas, TX

- Date: November 5, 2016
- Game time: 3:00 p.m. CDT
- Game attendance: 24,379
- TV announcers (ESPNews): Mike Corey and Rene Ingoglia

=== At East Carolina ===
SMU Mustangs vs. East Carolina Pirates – Game summary

Quarter	1	2	3	4	Total
SMU	10	28	10	7	55
East Carolina	7	17	0	7	31

at Dowdy–Ficklen Stadium • Greenville, NC

- Date: November 12, 2016
- Game time: 11:00 a.m. CDT
- Game attendance: 42,908
- TV announcers (ESPNews): Mike Couzens and Dan Hawkins

=== South Florida ===
South Florida Bulls at SMU Mustangs – Game summary

Quarter	1	2	3	4	Total
South Florida	14	7	7	7	35
SMU	7	7	10	3	27

at Gerald J. Ford Stadium • Dallas, TX

- Date: November 19, 2016
- Game time: 6:00 p.m. CDT
- Game attendance: 18,417
- TV announcers (CBSSN): John Sadak, Randy Cross, and Taylor Rooks

=== Navy ===
Navy Midshipmen at SMU Mustangs – Game summary

Quarter	1	2	3	4	Total
Navy	14	14	28	19	75
SMU	7	17	0	7	31

at Gerald J. Ford Stadium • Dallas, TX

- Date: November 26, 2016
- Game time: 2:30 p.m. CDT
- Game weather: Temperature: 63 °F (17 °C) • Wind: SE 4 mph • Weather: Partly Cloudy
- Game attendance: 21,283
- Referee: Michael Roche
- TV announcers (ESPNU): Kevin Brown and Clint Stoerner

== Roster ==
2016 SMU Mustangs football team roster
Players
Coaches
Offense

Pos.	#	Name	Class
QB	18	Sam Carey	Fr
QB	7	Darrel Colbert Jr.	So
QB	4	Matt Davis	Sr
QB	7	D.J. Gillins	Jr
QB	8	Ben Hicks	Fr
QB	13	Rafe Peavey	So
QB	12	Collin Rock	Fr
QB	17	Connor Simpson	So
RB	20	Jordan Carmouche	Fr
RB	13	Ke'Mon Freeman	Fr
RB	5	Xavier Jones	So
RB	28	Joseph Paden	Sr
RB	25	Aphonso Thomas	Fr
RB	6	Braeden West	So
WR	10	Brandon Benson	Fr
WR	2	Xavier Castille	So
WR	40	Derek Dickman	Fr
WR	22	Myron Gailliard	Fr
WR	15	Alex Honey	Fr
WR	3	James Proche	Fr
WR	18	Trey Quinn	Jr
WR	89	Austin Rolfe	Fr
WR	88	Joshua Shelmire	Fr
WR	16	Courtland Sutton	Jr
WR	1	Kevin Thomas	So
WR	9	Shelby Walker	Jr
TE	14	Ryan Becker	Fr
TE	45	Dylan Dickman	Sr
TE	84	Jeremiah Gaines	Sr
TE	24	Mitchell Kaufman	So
TE	82	Corey Rau	Fr
TE	11	Jordan Severt	So
OL	56	Harrison Barton	Fr
OL	77	Keaton Bates	Fr
OL	71	Chauncey Briggs	Sr
OL	63	Evan Brown	Jr
OL	72	Braylon Hyder	Jr
OL	67	Daniel McCarty	Jr
OL	65	Marcus McNeil	Fr
OL	68	Nick Natour	So
OL	79	Rex Printz	Jr
OL	57	Chad Pursley	So
OL	70	Kadarius Smith	Fr
OL	69	Jacob Todora	Fr
OL	74	Braxton Webb	Fr
OL	64	Bryce Wilds	Fr

Defense

Pos.	#	Name	Class
DL	97	Terry Ayeni	Sr
DL	7	Michael Badejo	Fr
DL	94	Chris Biggurs	Fr
DL	93	Mason Gentry	Jr
DL	98	Deon Green	Sr
DL	96	Robert Hall	Fr
DL	23	Nick Horton	Sr
DL	72	Patrick Jones	Fr
DL	99	Justin Lawler	Jr
DL	90	Jalen Lynch	Fr
DL	66	Myles McCormack	Fr
DL	95	Ken McLaurin	Fr
DL	92	Zelt Minor	Sr
DL	34	Jarvis Pruitt	Sr
DL	39	Keyfer Roberts	So
DL	35	Delontae Scott	Fr
DL	88	Hunter Thedford	Fr
DL	91	J.T. Williams	Jr
LB	46	Andrew Adams	So
LB	13	Blake Carlisle	Fr
LB	32	RC Cox	So
LB	25	Myles Duke	Fr
LB	22	Matt McNew	So
LB	49	Charlie Mitelhaus	Fr
LB	44	Jackson Mitchell	Sr
LB	11	Kyran Mitchell	So
LB	48	Anthony Rhone	Jr
LB	2	Noah Spears	Fr
LB	33	Jordan Ward	Fr
LB	17	Jordan Williams	Fr
DB	31	Rashaad Burton	So
DB	8	Rodney Clemons	Fr
DB	28	Christian Davis	Fr
DB	39	Brent Freeman	Jr
DB	18	William Jeanlys	So
DB	12	Kevin Johnson	Fr
DB	3	Cedric Lancaster	Jr
DB	41	Brice Madison	Fr
DB	29	Darrion Millines	Sr
DB	42	Raul Reyes III	So
DB	9	Horace Richardson	Sr
DB	1	Eric Sutton	Fr
DB	15	Jordan Wyatt	So

Special teams

Pos.	#	Name	Class
K	38	Michael Armstrong	So
K	45	Will Moore	Fr
K	5	Josh Williams	So
H	21	Sean Tuohy Jr.	Sr
P/K	43	Davis Luster	Fr
P/K	33	Alex Melvin	Fr
P	47	Jamie Sackville	Fr
LS	53	Nicholas Aventino	So
LS	56	Michael Sehlinger	Fr
LS	54	Garrett Stotts	So

Head coach

- Chad Morris

Coordinators/assistant coaches

- Joe Craddock – Offensive Coordinator/Quarterbacks
- Van Malone – Defensive Coordinator
- Dustin Fry – Offensive Line
- Keith Gunn – Tight Ends
- Jess Loepp – Secondary
- Claude Mathis – Running Backs
- Archie McDaniel – Linebackers
- Justin Stepp – Assistant Coach/WR
- Buddy Wyatt – Assistant Coach/DL
- Daric Riley – Special Teams Analyst
- Marc Soltis – Strength Coach
- Sam Ogden – Director of Football Video Services
- Mike Morton – Asst. A.D- Student Health and Well-being
- Randy Ross – Sr. Associate Director of Football Operations
- Mark Smith – Director of Football Recruiting
- Steve Stigall – Associate Director of Football Ops/Player Development
- Albert Veytia – Director of Equipment Operations
- Isaiah deLaura – Football Video GA
- Terry Gardner – Administrative Assistant to Head Coach
- Brooke Stepp – Recruiting Operations Coordinator
- Stephen Sorrells – Graduate Assistant/Offensive Line
- Chris Scott – Graduate Assistant/Defense

Legend

- (C) Team captain
- (S) Suspended
- (I) Ineligible
- Injured
- Redshirt

Roster
