= Bob Diaco =

American football player and coach (born 1973)

Current position
- Title: Defensive line coach
- Team: North Carolina
- Conference: ACC

Biographical details
- Born: February 19, 1973 (age 53); Cedar Grove, New Jersey, U.S.

Playing career
- 1992–1995: Iowa
- Position: Linebacker

Coaching career (HC unless noted)
- 1996–1997: Iowa (GA)
- 1999–2000: Western Illinois (RB/ST)
- 2001: Eastern Michigan (RB/ST)
- 2002: Eastern Michigan (LB/ST)
- 2003: Eastern Michigan (OLB/ST)
- 2004: Western Michigan (LB/ST)
- 2005: Central Michigan (co-DC/LB)
- 2006–2008: Virginia (LB/ST)
- 2009: Cincinnati (DC/ILB)
- 2010–2011: Notre Dame (DC/ILB)
- 2012–2013: Notre Dame (AHC/DC/LB)
- 2014–2016: UConn
- 2017: Nebraska (DC)
- 2018: Oklahoma (OLB)
- 2019: Louisiana Tech (DC/LB)
- 2020: Purdue (DC/LB)
- 2022–2023: New Jersey Generals (DL)
- 2023–2024: LSU (ST/OLB)
- 2025–present: North Carolina (DL)

Head coaching record
- Overall: 11–26
- Bowls: 0–1

Accomplishments and honors

Awards
- Broyles Award (2012); Second-team All-Big Ten (1995)

Robert Albert Diaco (born February 19, 1973) is an American football coach and a former linebacker. He is the defensive line coach for the North Carolina Tar Heels of the Atlantic Coast Conference (ACC). He played college football at the University of Iowa for coach Hayden Fry from 1992 to 1995. He then served as the head coach of the UConn Huskies (2014–2016).

Diaco was born in Cedar Grove, New Jersey. He attended Cedar Grove High School. After graduation from high school in Cedar Grove in 1992, Diaco enrolled at the University of Iowa and played linebacker for the Hawkeyes, starting for two seasons. As a senior in 1995, he led Iowa to the 1995 Sun Bowl and was a two-time All-Big Ten Conference selection.

He was previously an assistant at Western Illinois, Eastern Michigan, Central Michigan, Virginia, Cincinnati, Notre Dame, Nebraska, Oklahoma, Louisiana Tech, Purdue, and LSU.

== Playing career ==
Diaco played college football at the University of Iowa, under head coach Hayden Fry, who described Diaco as "extremely tough, very intelligent". He was a two-time All-Big Ten selection as a linebacker and was named the team's co-MVP in 1995, starting in all 23 games over his junior and senior seasons. Diaco was teammates with Mike Devlin, Scott Slutzker, Danan Hughes, and Mike Wells.

== Coaching career ==
Diaco began his coaching career in 1996 as a graduate assistant at Iowa. From 2001 to 2004, Diaco was an assistant coach at Eastern Michigan, coaching running backs, linebackers, and special teams. He became the linebackers and special teams coach at Virginia in 2006, coaching under Al Groh.

=== Cincinnati ===
Diaco served as the defensive coordinator at Cincinnati in 2009 under Brian Kelly. Cincinnati finished the year ranked 44th in NCAA Division I-A in points allowed per game (23.1) and 23rd in sacks (37.0).

=== Notre Dame ===
Diaco followed Kelly to Notre Dame in 2010, taking the same position as defensive coordinator. In 2012, Notre Dame finished the year ranked second in points allowed per game (12.8) and appeared in the 2013 BCS National Championship Game. Diaco was awarded the Broyles Award, which recognizes the top assistant coach in college football.

=== Connecticut ===
In December 2013, Diaco became the head coach at the University of Connecticut, succeeding interim coach T. J. Weist, who replaced Paul Pasqualoni. Diaco was replaced at Notre Dame by Brian VanGorder.

While at Connecticut, Diaco coined the term "Civil Conflict" to describe games between the Connecticut Huskies and the UCF Knights. This one-way declaration of a "rivalry" was first derided and then ignored by UCF.

==== 2015 ====
In 2015, Diaco's Huskies beat undefeated Houston 20–17 at Rentschler Field to make the Huskies bowl-eligible for the first time since Edsall left. At this point many UConn fans believed that Diaco was the future of the program after taking a 2–10 team to a bowl game the next year.

==== 2016 ====
After an exciting 2015, the Huskies were projected to be bowl-eligible in 2016, but hope quickly faded after a weak win over FCS Maine, and a botched goal-to-go situation vs. Navy that would have put the Huskies at 2–0. The Huskies traveled to Houston at 2–2, but got blown out. UConn then went on to beat Cincinnati 20–9, but then lost out to finish 3–9.

Connecticut fired Diaco on December 26, 2016, effective January 2, 2017. His buyout, renegotiated after the 2015 season, was $3.4 million. Media reports indicated that Diaco's refusal to consider former Minnesota head coach Jerry Kill for the position of offensive coordinator may have led to his termination. Connecticut hired former head coach Randy Edsall to replace him. Diaco finished his head coaching career at the University of Connecticut having the worst winning percentage amongst Huskies' head coaches since 1920.

=== Nebraska ===
In 2017, head coach Mike Riley hired Diaco to serve as the defensive coordinator at Nebraska. He was fired along with Riley and most other assistant coaches on November 25, 2017 after the Cornhuskers finished 4–8.

=== Oklahoma ===
Diaco joined the University of Oklahoma as a defensive analyst on March 17, 2018. He was subsequently promoted to outside linebackers coach on October 8, 2018 after defensive coordinator Mike Stoops was fired by head coach Lincoln Riley.

=== Louisiana Tech ===
Diaco was named defensive coordinator at Louisiana Tech on January 24, 2019.

=== Purdue ===
On January 2, 2020, Diaco was named the defensive coordinator and linebackers coach at Purdue University. Following the 2020 season, head coach Jeff Brohm announced Diaco would not return.

=== New Jersey Generals ===
In March 2022, Diaco was named the defensive line coach for the New Jersey Generals.

=== LSU ===
Prior to the 2023 season, Diaco was named as a defensive analyst for the LSU Tigers. On August 2, 2023, defensive line coach Jimmy Lindsey stepped away from the program due to a personal health matter. As a result, John Jancek took over as defensive line coach and Diaco became the outside linebackers and special teams coach.

=== North Carolina ===
On March 3, 2025, Diaco was named as the defensive line coach for the North Carolina Tar Heels.

== Head coaching record ==
Year	Team	Overall	Conference	Standing	Bowl/playoffs
UConn Huskies (American Athletic Conference) (2014–2016)
2014	UConn	2–10	1–7	T–10th	
2015	UConn	6–7	4–4	T–3rd (East)	L St. Petersburg
2016	UConn	3–9	1–7	T–4th (East)	
UConn:		11–26	6–18		
Total:		11–26			
