= 2016 Memphis Tigers football team =

American college football season

2016 Memphis Tigers football

Boca Raton Bowl, L 31–51 vs. Western Kentucky
- Conference: American Athletic Conference
- West Division
- Record: 8–5 (5–3 The American)
- Head coach: Mike Norvell (1st season)
- Offensive coordinator: Chip Long (1st season)
- Offensive scheme: Spread
- Defensive coordinator: Chris Ball (1st season)
- Base defense: Multiple
- Home stadium: Liberty Bowl Memorial Stadium

2016 American Athletic Conference football standings
	Conf.			Overall
Team	W		L	W		L
East Division
Temple xy$	7	–	1	10	–	4
No. 19 South Florida x	7	–	1	11	–	2
UCF	4	–	4	6	–	7
Cincinnati	1	–	7	4	–	8
UConn	1	–	7	3	–	9
East Carolina	1	–	7	3	–	9
West Division
Navy xy	7	–	1	9	–	5
Tulsa	6	–	2	10	–	3
Memphis	5	–	3	8	–	5
Houston	5	–	3	9	–	4
SMU	3	–	5	5	–	7
Tulane	1	–	7	4	–	8
Championship: Temple 34, Navy 10
$ – Conference champion; x – Division champion/co-champions; y – Championship game participant; Rankings from AP Poll

The 2016 Memphis Tigers football team represented the University of Memphis in the 2016 NCAA Division I FBS football season. The Tigers were led by first-year head coach Mike Norvell and played their home games at the Liberty Bowl Memorial Stadium in Memphis, Tennessee. The Tigers competed as a member of the West Division of the American Athletic Conference. They finished the season 8–5, 5–3 in American Athletic play to finish in a tie for third place in the West Division. They were invited to the Boca Raton Bowl where they lost to Western Kentucky.

== Schedule ==
Date	Time	Opponent	Site	TV	Result	Attendance
September 3	6:00 p.m.	Southeast Missouri State*	Liberty Bowl Memorial Stadium; Memphis, TN	ESPN3	W 35–17	42,876
September 17	11:00 a.m.	Kansas*	Liberty Bowl Memorial Stadium; Memphis, TN	ESPNU	W 43–7	34,448
September 24	7:00 p.m.	Bowling Green*	Liberty Bowl Memorial Stadium; Memphis, TN	ESPNews	W 77–3	38,713
October 1	6:00 p.m.	at No. 16 Ole Miss*	Vaught–Hemingway Stadium; Oxford, MS (rivalry)	ESPN2	L 28–48	65,889
October 6	7:00 p.m.	Temple	Liberty Bowl Memorial Stadium; Memphis, TN	ESPN	W 34–27	34,743
October 14	7:00 p.m.	at Tulane	Yulman Stadium; New Orleans, LA	ESPNU	W 24–14	21,098
October 22	2:30 p.m.	at No. 24 Navy	Navy–Marine Corps Memorial Stadium; Annapolis, MD	CBSSN	L 28–42	35,943
October 29	7:00 p.m.	Tulsa^{†}	Liberty Bowl Memorial Stadium; Memphis, TN	ESPNews	L 30–59	36,894
November 5	3:00 p.m.	at SMU	Gerald J. Ford Stadium; Dallas, TX	ESPNews	W 51–7	24,379
November 12	6:00 p.m.	South Florida	Liberty Bowl Memorial Stadium; Memphis, TN	CBSSN	L 42–49	37,218
November 18	7:00 p.m.	at Cincinnati	Nippert Stadium; Cincinnati, OH	CBSSN	W 34–7	25,796
November 25	11:00 a.m.	No. 18 Houston	Liberty Bowl Memorial Stadium; Memphis, TN	ABC	W 48–44	36,527
December 20	6:00 p.m.	vs. Western Kentucky*	FAU Stadium; Boca Raton, Florida (Boca Raton Bowl)	ESPN	L 31–51	24,726
*Non-conference game; ^{†}Homecoming; Rankings from AP Poll released prior to the game; All times are in Central time

== Game summaries ==
=== Southeast Missouri State ===
	1	2	3	4	Total
Redhawks	0	3	7	7	17
Tigers	22	7	3	3	35

=== Kansas ===
	1	2	3	4	Total
Jayhawks	0	7	0	0	7
Tigers	13	20	3	7	43

=== Bowling Green ===
	1	2	3	4	Total
Falcons	3	0	0	0	3
Tigers	35	21	14	7	77

=== At Ole Miss ===
	1	2	3	4	Total
Tigers	0	7	14	7	28
#23 Rebels	14	10	10	14	48

=== Temple ===
	1	2	3	4	Total
Owls	6	7	0	14	27
Tigers	0	3	17	14	34

=== At Tulane ===
	1	2	3	4	Total
Tigers	3	10	3	8	24
Green Wave	0	7	0	7	14

=== At Navy ===
	1	2	3	4	Total
Tigers	14	0	7	7	28
#24 Midshipmen	14	7	14	7	42

=== Tulsa ===
	1	2	3	4	Total
Golden Hurricane	14	21	10	14	59
Tigers	7	17	6	0	30

=== At SMU ===
	1	2	3	4	Total
Tigers	21	17	13	0	51
Mustangs	7	0	0	0	7

=== South Florida ===
	1	2	3	4	Total
Bulls	14	7	14	14	49
Tigers	3	14	14	11	42

=== At Cincinnati ===
	1	2	3	4	Total
Tigers	13	14	7	0	34
Bearcats	0	0	0	7	7

=== Houston ===
	1	2	3	4	Total
#18 Cougars	10	7	10	17	44
Tigers	21	13	0	14	48

=== Vs. Western Kentucky–Boca Raton Bowl ===
	1	2	3	4	Total
Tigers	0	7	7	7	21
Hilltoppers	14	14	16	7	51

== Personnel ==
=== Depth chart ===
Defense

FS
39 Reggis Ball
⋅

WLB	ILB	ILB	SLB
13 Tank Jakes	34 Jackson Dillon	⋅	⋅
16 Wynton McManis	99 Kendrick Golden	⋅	⋅

SS
15 Fritz Etienne
17 Chris Morley

CB
10 Dontrell Nelson
12 Chauncey Lanier

DE	NT	DE
48 Ernest Suttles	56 Terry Redden	97 Martin Ifedi
91 Ricky Hunter	93 Cortez Crosby	14 Latarius Brady

CB
21 Bobby McCain
23 BJ Ross

Offense

"X" WR
87 Tevin Jones
83 Baniel Hurd

"Z" WR
7 Keiwone Malone
2 Joe Craig

LT	LG	C	RG	RT
77 Taylor Fallin	63 Tyler Uselton	71 Gabe Kuhn	75 Micheal Stannard	54 Al Bond
65 Christopher Roberson	76 Patrick Winfield	70 Micah Simmons	66 Tony Mays	79 Nykiren Wellington

WR
⋅
⋅

"S" WR
11 Sam Craft
5 Mose Frazier

QB
4 Riley Ferguson
2 David Moore

RB
38 Brandon Hayes
22 Doroland Dorceus

Special teams
PK 46 Jake Elliott
PK 36 Spencer Smith
P 36 Spencer Smith
P 47 Nick Jacobs
KR 2 Joe Craig
PR 21 Bobby McCain
H 35 Evan Micheal

=== Roster ===
2016 Memphis Tigers football team roster
Players
Coaches
Offense

Pos.	#	Name	Class
WR	1	Tony Pollard	Fr
QB	2	David Moore	Fr
WR	3	Anthony Miller	Jr
QB	4	Riley Ferguson	Jr
WR	5	Sean Dykes	Fr
RB	6	Patrick Taylor	Fr
QB	7	Brady Davis	Fr
RB	8	Darrell Henderson	Fr
WR	9	John Williams	Fr
WR	10	Damonte Coxie	Fr
RB	11	Sam Craft	Sr
WR	13	Kedarian Jones	Fr
QB	15	Jason Stewart	Sr
WR	18	Roderick Proctor	Jr
WR	19	Jae'Lon Oglesby	So
RB	24	Tearris Wallace	Fr
WR	25	Jaylen McClanahan	Fr
WR	27	Jahod Booker	Fr
RB	28	Doroland Dorceus	Jr
WR	37	Austin Duncan	Fr
RB	38	Quincy Wimbish	Fr
TE	39	Brennan Ryan	Fr
TE	42	Gavin McCrary	So
WR	44	Malik Thomas	So
OL	50	Lio Lafaele	Jr
OL	51	Jace Neville	So
OL	53	Dustin Woodard	Fr
OL	54	Drew Kyser	So
OL	59	Brytain Peddy	So
OL	60	Cooper Williams	So
OL	63	Ryan Young	Fr
OL	64	Zach Collins	Jr
OL	65	Christopher Roberson	Sr
OL	71	Gabe Kuhn	Jr
OL	72	Trevon Tate	So
OL	73	Keenen Davis	Fr
OL	74	Jonathan Timmons	Fr
OL	75	Tauvaga Ho Ching II	So
OL	77	Harneet Gill	Jr
OL	78	Nick Thomas	So
OL	79	Scottie Dill	Fr
TE	80	Daniel Montiel	Sr
WR	81	Mechane Slade	Fr
WR	82	Hunter Hill	Fr
WR	83	Daniel Hurd	Sr
TE	84	Robby Young	Jr
TE	85	Kyle Oliver	So
TE	86	Joey Magnifico	Fr
TE	87	Ross Burcham	Fr
WR	88	Drew Bishop	Sr
WR	89	Phil Mayhue	Jr

Defense

Pos.	#	Name	Class
DL	1	Jacoby Hill	Fr
DB	2	Tye Northern	So
DB	4	Josh Perry	Fr
DL	5	Latarius Brady	Sr
LB	6	Genard Avery	Fr
LB	7	Curtis Akins	So
DB	8	Arthur Maulet	Sr
DB	9	Jamil Collins	Jr
DB	10	Dontrell Nelson	Sr
DB	12	Chauncey Lanier	Sr
DL	13	DeMarco Montgomery	Sr
DB	14	Jonathan Cook	Jr
DL	15	Christian Johnson	Jr
LB	16	Nehemiah Augustus	Fr
DB	17	Chris Morley	Sr
DB	19	Shaun Rupert	Jr
DB	21	Kam Prewitt	Fr
DB	22	Tyrez Lindsey	Fr
DB	23	B. J. Ross	Sr
DB	24	Deandre Jordan	Sr
DB	25	Austin Hall	Fr
DB	26	Jahmahl Pardner	Sr
LB	29	Darian Porter	Jr
LB	30	Shareef White	Jr
DB	31	Anthony Young	Jr
DB	32	Jacobi Francis	Fr
DB	33	Phillip Sumpter	Jr
LB	34	Jackson Dillon	Sr
LB	35	Tim Hart	Fr
DL	38	Jonathan Wilson	Fr
DB	39	Christian Slaughter	Jr
DB	40	Thomas Pickens	Fr
LB	44	Steven Enis	Fr
LB	45	Noah Robinson	Jr
DB	47	Colton Cochran	Fr
DL	48	Ernest Suttles	Jr
LB	49	Joseph Prevost	Fr
LB	50	Lenard Harden	Sr
LB	55	Bryce Huff	Fr
LB	57	Hayden Ferrari	Fr
DL	58	Donald Pennington	Sr
LB	59	Malcolm Lane	Fr
LB	61	Zane Sutherland	Fr
DL	90	John Tate	Fr
DL	91	Nick Raby	Fr
DL	92	Peyton Jones	Fr
DL	93	Cortez Crosby	Jr
DL	94	Freddie Dillard	Fr
DL	95	Michael Edwards	Sr
DL	96	Khalil Johnson	Fr
DL	97	Emmanuel Cooper	So
DL	98	Jared Gentry	So
DL	99	Chase Joy	Fr

Special teams

Pos.	#	Name	Class
P	35	Evan Michael	Jr
P, PK	36	Spencer Smith	Jr
LS	41	Trevor Morgan	Sr
PK	46	Jake Elliott	Sr
P	47	Nick Jacobs	Jr
LS	52	Tim Belles	Fr
LS	56	Andrew Ashe	So

Head coach

- Mike Norvell

Coordinators/assistant coaches

- Chris Ball (defensive coordinator)
- Chip Long (offensive coordinator / tight ends)
- Darrell Dickey (assistant head coach / running backs)
- David Johnson (wide receivers)
- Dan Lanning (inside linebackers / recruiting coordinator)
- Joe Lorig (special teams coordinator / outside linebackers)
- Paul Randolph (defensive line)
- Ryan Silverfield (offensive line)
- Marcus Woodson (defensive backs)
- Jeff Kupper (director, football operations)
- Brennan Ball (graduate assistant - defense)
- Marcus Bell (director of high school relations)
- Braxton Brady (director of player relations)
- Kenny Dillingham (graduate assistant – quarterbacks)
- Kwahn Drake (intern - offense)
- Nick Gilbert (graduate assistant – asst. offensive line coach)
- Matthew Haron (director of football video)
- Mac Hohorst (equipment manager)
- Spencer Knight (special teams/outside linebackers intern)
- Brian Michalowski (graduate assistant, defense)
- Sherman Morris (director of recruiting operations)
- Akoya Nelson (recruiting secretary)
- George Pugh (director of player personnel)
- Larry Reynolds (assistant athletic trainer)
- Sherri Schwartz (assistant to the head coach)
- Darrell Turner (head athletic trainer)

Legend

- (C) Team captain
- (S) Suspended
- (I) Ineligible
- Injured
- Redshirt

Roster
Last update: October 3, 2016
