= 2016 Temple Owls football team =

American college football season

2016 Temple Owls football

The American champion The American East Division co-champion

American Championship, W 34–10 vs. Navy

Military Bowl, L 26–34 vs. Wake Forest
- Conference: American Athletic Conference
- East Division
- Record: 10–4 (7–1 AAC)
- Head coach: Matt Rhule (4th season; regular season); Ed Foley (interim; bowl game)
- Offensive coordinator: Glenn Thomas (1st season)
- Offensive scheme: Spread
- Defensive coordinator: Phil Snow (4th season)
- Base defense: 4–3
- Home stadium: Lincoln Financial Field

2016 American Athletic Conference football standings
	Conf.			Overall
Team	W		L	W		L
East Division
Temple xy$	7	–	1	10	–	4
No. 19 South Florida x	7	–	1	11	–	2
UCF	4	–	4	6	–	7
Cincinnati	1	–	7	4	–	8
UConn	1	–	7	3	–	9
East Carolina	1	–	7	3	–	9
West Division
Navy xy	7	–	1	9	–	5
Tulsa	6	–	2	10	–	3
Memphis	5	–	3	8	–	5
Houston	5	–	3	9	–	4
SMU	3	–	5	5	–	7
Tulane	1	–	7	4	–	8
Championship: Temple 34, Navy 10
$ – Conference champion; x – Division champion/co-champions; y – Championship game participant; Rankings from AP Poll

The 2016 Temple Owls football team represented Temple University in the 2016 NCAA Division I FBS football season. The Owls were led by fourth-year head coach Matt Rhule and played their home games at Lincoln Financial Field. They were members of the East Division of the American Athletic Conference.

On December 6, Rhule resigned to become the head coach at Baylor. Special teams coordinator and tight ends coach Ed Foley led the Owls in the Military Bowl.

== Schedule ==
Date	Time	Opponent	Rank	Site	TV	Result	Attendance
September 2	7:00 p.m.	Army*		Lincoln Financial Field; Philadelphia, PA	CBSSN	L 13–28	34,005
September 10	1:00 p.m.	Stony Brook*		Lincoln Financial Field; Philadelphia, PA	ESPN3	W 38–0	22,296
September 17	12:00 p.m.	at Penn State*		Beaver Stadium; University Park, PA	BTN	L 27–34	100,420
September 24	12:00 p.m.	Charlotte*^{†}		Lincoln Financial Field; Philadelphia, PA	ASN	W 48–20	27,786
October 1	12:00 p.m.	SMU		Lincoln Financial Field; Philadelphia, PA	ESPNews	W 45–20	22,401
October 6	8:00 p.m.	at Memphis		Liberty Bowl Memorial Stadium; Memphis, TN	ESPN	L 27–34	34,743
October 15	7:30 p.m.	at UCF		Bright House Networks Stadium; Orlando, FL	ESPNU	W 26–25	38,299
October 21	7:00 p.m.	South Florida		Lincoln Financial Field; Philadelphia, PA	ESPN	W 46–30	25,950
October 29	3:30 p.m.	Cincinnati		Lincoln Financial Field; Philadelphia, PA	CBSSN	W 34–13	29,763
November 4	7:00 p.m.	at UConn		Rentschler Field; East Hartford, CT	ESPN2	W 21–0	22,316
November 19	3:30 p.m.	at Tulane		Yulman Stadium; New Orleans, LA	ASN	W 31–0	16,497
November 26	7:30 p.m.	East Carolina		Lincoln Financial Field; Philadelphia, PA	ESPNews	W 37–10	28,373
December 3	12:00 p.m.	at No. 19 Navy		Navy–Marine Corps Memorial Stadium; Annapolis, MD (American Athletic Conference Championship Game)	ABC	W 34–10	22,815
December 27	3:30 p.m.	vs. Wake Forest*	No. 24	Navy–Marine Corps Memorial Stadium; Annapolis, MD (Military Bowl)	ESPN	L 26–34	26,656
*Non-conference game; ^{†}Homecoming; Rankings from AP Poll and CFP Rankings after November 1 released prior to game; All times are in Eastern time

== Roster ==
2016 Temple Owls football team roster
Players
Coaches
Offense

Pos.	#	Name	Class
WR	1	Ventell Bryant	So
FB	4	Nick Sharga	Jr
RB	5	Jahad Thomas	Sr
QB	8	Phillip Walker	Sr
QB	15	Anthony Russo	Fr
TE	86	Colin Thompson	Sr

Defense

Pos.	#	Name	Class
LB	2	Avery Williams	Sr
DB	3	Sean Chandler	Jr
DL	7	Haason Reddick	Sr

Special teams

Pos.	#	Name	Class

Head coach

- Ed Foley

Coordinators/assistant coaches

- Mike Siravo (LB)

Legend

- (C) Team captain
- (S) Suspended
- (I) Ineligible
- Injured
- Redshirt

Roster

== Game summaries ==
=== Army ===
	1	2	3	4	Total
Black Knights	0	7	7	14	28
Owls	0	10	3	0	13

=== Stony Brook ===
	1	2	3	4	Total
Seawolves	0	0	0	0	0
Owls	14	14	10	0	38

=== At Penn State ===
	1	2	3	4	Total
Owls	7	3	7	10	27
Nittany Lions	14	7	3	10	34

=== Charlotte ===
	1	2	3	4	Total
49ers	7	0	7	6	20
Owls	3	28	14	3	48

=== SMU ===
	1	2	3	4	Total
Mustangs	7	7	0	6	20
Owls	21	14	3	7	45

=== At Memphis ===
	1	2	3	4	Total
Owls	6	7	0	14	27
Tigers	0	3	17	14	34

=== At UCF ===
	1	2	3	4	Total
Owls	7	7	6	6	26
Knights	11	14	0	0	25

=== South Florida ===
	1	2	3	4	Total
Bulls	7	6	10	7	30
Owls	3	17	14	12	46

=== Cincinnati ===
	1	2	3	4	Total
Bearcats	0	13	0	0	13
Owls	10	7	3	14	34

=== At UConn ===
	1	2	3	4	Total
Owls	21	0	0	0	21
Huskies	0	0	0	0	0

=== At Tulane ===
	1	2	3	4	Total
Owls	7	3	14	7	31
Green Wave	0	0	0	0	0

=== East Carolina ===
	1	2	3	4	Total
Pirates	7	0	0	3	10
Owls	7	14	6	10	37

=== At Navy–American Athletic Championship Game ===
	1	2	3	4	Total
Owls	14	10	0	10	34
#20 Midshipmen	0	3	7	0	10

The Owls dominated a Navy Midshipmen football offense that was ranked in the top 20 in the country, coming off a 75-point offensive outburst the week before to win the first major conference title in Temple history. Temple sent one of its largest away crowds ever, with nearly half the fans in attendance supporting the Owls. Temple was ranked in all three major polls following the game and were invited to the Military Bowl vs Wake Forest Demon Deacons football on December 27, 2016.

=== Wake Forest–Military Bowl ===
	1	2	3	4	Total
#23 Owls	7	3	10	6	26
Demon Deacons	14	17	0	3	34

== Awards and honors ==
=== American Athletic Conference All-Conference Team ===
- First Team

Dion Dawkins, OT
Haason Reddick, DL

- Second Team

Jahad Thomas, RB
Praise Martin-Oguike, DL
Avery Williams, LB
Sean Chandler, S
Aaron Boumerhi, K

- Honorable Mention

Colin Thompson, TE
Stephaun Marshall, LB

== Rankings ==
Ranking movements Legend: ██ Increase in ranking ██ Decrease in ranking — = Not ranked RV = Received votes
	Week															
Poll	Pre	1	2	3	4	5	6	7	8	9	10	11	12	13	14	Final
AP	—	—	—	—	—	—	—	—	—	—	—	—	RV	RV	23	RV
Coaches	—	—	—	—	—	—	—	—	—	—	—	—	RV	RV	24	RV
CFP	Not released									—	—	—	—	—	24	Not released

== NFL players ==
=== NFL Draft Combine ===
Four Temple players were invited to participate in the 2017 NFL Scouting Combine.

#	Name	POS	HT	WT	Arms	Hands	40	Bench Press	Vert Jump	Broad Jump	3 Cone Drill	20-yd Shuttle	Ref
#5	Jahad Thomas	RB	5-10	190 lbs	30 1/8	9	4.62	11	32.0 in	116.0			
#7	Haason Reddick	LB	6-1	237 lbs	32 3/4	10 1/8	4.52†	24	36.5 in†	133.0 in†	7.01	4.37	
#15	Nate Hairston	CB	6-0	196 lbs	31	9 1/2	4.52	14	35.5 in	118.0 in			
#66	Dion Dawkins	OL	6-4	314 lbs	35	9 7/8	5.11	26	26.0 in	106.0 in	7.30†	4.78	

† Top performer

=== 2017 NFL draft ===
Following the season, the following members of the Temple football team were selected in the 2017 NFL draft.

#	Player	Round	Pick	Position	NFL Club
#7	Haason Reddick	1	13	Linebacker	Arizona Cardinals
#66	Dion Dawkins	2	63	Offensive lineman	Buffalo Bills
#15	Nate Hairston	5	158	Cornerback	Indianapolis Colts

=== Undrafted free agents ===
In addition to the draft selections above, the following Temple players signed NFL contracts after the draft.

#	Name	POS	HT	WT	NFL Club	Ref
#2	Avery Williams	LB	5-10	224 lbs	Houston Texans	
#5	Jahad Thomas	RB	5-10	188 lbs	Dallas Cowboys	
#8	Phillip Walker	QB	5-11	205 lbs	Indianapolis Colts	
#11	Romond Deloatch	TE	6-4	245 lbs	New York Giants	
#50	Praise Martin-Oguike	DL	6-1	255 lbs	Miami Dolphins	
#86	Colin Thompson	TE	6-4	255 lbs	New York Giants	
