= 2016 South Florida Bulls football team =

American college football season

2016 South Florida Bulls football

The American East Division co-champion Birmingham Bowl champion

Birmingham Bowl, W 46–39 ^{OT} vs. South Carolina
- Conference: American Athletic Conference
- East Division

Ranking
- Coaches: No. 19
- AP: No. 19
- Record: 11–2 (7–1 AAC)
- Head coach: Willie Taggart (4th season)
- Co-offensive coordinators: T. J. Weist (1st season); Darren Hiller (1st season)
- Offensive scheme: Gulf Coast
- Defensive coordinator: Raymond Woodie Jr. (1st season)
- Base defense: 4–2–5
- Home stadium: Raymond James Stadium

2016 American Athletic Conference football standings
	Conf.			Overall
Team	W		L	W		L
East Division
Temple xy$	7	–	1	10	–	4
No. 19 South Florida x	7	–	1	11	–	2
UCF	4	–	4	6	–	7
Cincinnati	1	–	7	4	–	8
UConn	1	–	7	3	–	9
East Carolina	1	–	7	3	–	9
West Division
Navy xy	7	–	1	9	–	5
Tulsa	6	–	2	10	–	3
Memphis	5	–	3	8	–	5
Houston	5	–	3	9	–	4
SMU	3	–	5	5	–	7
Tulane	1	–	7	4	–	8
Championship: Temple 34, Navy 10
$ – Conference champion; x – Division champion/co-champions; y – Championship game participant; Rankings from AP Poll

The 2016 South Florida Bulls football team represented the University of South Florida (USF) in the 2016 NCAA Division I FBS football season. The 2016 season is the 20th season for the Bulls, and their fourth as a member of the American Athletic Conference (The American). They played their home games at Raymond James Stadium in Tampa, Florida, and were led during the regular season by head coach Willie Taggart, who was in his fourth year. Following the regular season, but before the team's appearance in the Birmingham Bowl, Taggart left to take the head coaching vacancy at Oregon, with co-offensive coordinator T. J. Weist named as interim head coach for the bowl game.

This was the first time in program history that the Bulls finished a season ranked in the AP Poll.

== Schedule ==
Date	Time	Opponent	Rank	Site	TV	Result	Attendance
September 3	7:00 p.m.	No. 24 (FCS) Towson*		Raymond James Stadium; Tampa, FL	ASN	W 56–20	35,976
September 10	7:00 p.m.	Northern Illinois*		Raymond James Stadium; Tampa, FL	CBSSN	W 48–17	36,557
September 17	3:30 p.m.	at Syracuse*		Carrier Dome; Syracuse, NY	ACCN+	W 45–20	32,288
September 24	12:00 p.m.	No. 13 Florida State*		Raymond James Stadium; Tampa, FL	ABC	L 35–55	61,665
October 1	7:00 p.m.	at Cincinnati		Nippert Stadium; Cincinnati, OH	ESPNU	W 45–20	35,108
October 8	12:00 p.m.	East Carolina^{†}		Raymond James Stadium; Tampa, FL	ESPNews	W 38–22	30,397
October 15	7:00 p.m.	UConn		Raymond James Stadium; Tampa, FL	CBSSN	W 42–27	30,297
October 21	7:00 p.m.	at Temple		Lincoln Financial Field; Philadelphia, PA	ESPN	L 30–46	25,950
October 28	7:00 p.m.	No. 22 Navy		Raymond James Stadium; Tampa, FL	ESPN2	W 52–45	31,824
November 12	7:00 p.m.	at Memphis		Liberty Bowl Memorial Stadium; Memphis, TN	CBSSN	W 49–42	37,218
November 19	7:00 p.m.	at SMU		Gerald J. Ford Stadium; Dallas, TX	CBSSN	W 35–27	18,417
November 26	12:00 p.m.	UCF		Raymond James Stadium; Tampa, FL (War on I–4)	CBSSN	W 48–31	36,056
December 29	2:00 p.m.	vs. South Carolina*	No. 25	Legion Field; Birmingham, AL (Birmingham Bowl)	ESPN	W 46–39 ^{OT}	31,229
*Non-conference game; ^{†}Homecoming; Rankings from AP Poll released prior to the game; All times are in Eastern time

== Game summaries ==
=== Towson ===
	1	2	3	4	Total
#24 (FCS) Tigers	3	7	7	3	20
Bulls	14	14	21	7	56

=== Northern Illinois ===
	1	2	3	4	Total
Huskies	0	7	0	10	17
Bulls	14	13	14	7	48

=== At Syracuse ===
	1	2	3	4	Total
Bulls	0	28	7	10	45
Orange	17	0	3	0	20

=== Florida State ===
	1	2	3	4	Total
#13 Seminoles	28	10	7	10	55
Bulls	14	0	7	14	35

=== At Cincinnati ===
	1	2	3	4	Total
Bulls	10	14	14	7	45
Bearcats	6	14	0	0	20

=== East Carolina ===
	1	2	3	4	Total
Pirates	3	3	7	9	22
Bulls	7	10	7	14	38

=== UConn ===
	1	2	3	4	Total
Huskies	3	0	14	10	27
Bulls	7	7	7	21	42

=== At Temple ===
	1	2	3	4	Total
Bulls	7	6	10	7	30
Owls	3	17	14	12	46

=== Navy ===
	1	2	3	4	Total
#22 Midshipmen	0	14	7	24	45
Bulls	28	14	3	7	52

=== At Memphis ===
	1	2	3	4	Total
Bulls	14	7	14	14	49
Tigers	3	14	14	11	42

=== At SMU ===
	1	2	3	4	Total
Bulls	14	7	7	7	35
Mustangs	7	7	10	3	27

=== UCF ===
	1	2	3	4	Total
Knights	7	7	10	7	31
Bulls	14	10	7	17	48

=== South Carolina–Birmingham Bowl ===
	1	2	3	4	OT	Total
#25 Bulls	15	14	10	0	7	46
Gamecocks	0	14	10	15	0	39

== Rankings ==
Ranking movements Legend: ██ Increase in ranking ██ Decrease in ranking — = Not ranked RV = Received votes т = Tied with team above or below
	Week															
Poll	Pre	1	2	3	4	5	6	7	8	9	10	11	12	13	14	Final
AP	RV	—	—	RV	—	RV	RV	RV	—	RV	RV	RV	RV	24–T	25	19
Coaches	RV	RV	RV	RV	RV	RV	RV	RV	RV	RV	RV	RV	RV	23	22	19
CFP	Not released									—	—	—	—	—	—	Not released
