= 2016 East Carolina Pirates football team =

American college football season

2016 East Carolina Pirates football
- Conference: American Athletic Conference
- East Division
- Record: 3–9 (1–7 The American)
- Head coach: Scottie Montgomery (1st season)
- Offensive coordinator: Tony Petersen (1st season)
- Offensive scheme: Multiple
- Defensive coordinator: Kenwick Thompson (1st season)
- Base defense: 3–4
- Home stadium: Dowdy–Ficklen Stadium

2016 American Athletic Conference football standings
	Conf.			Overall
Team	W		L	W		L
East Division
Temple xy$	7	–	1	10	–	4
No. 19 South Florida x	7	–	1	11	–	2
UCF	4	–	4	6	–	7
Cincinnati	1	–	7	4	–	8
UConn	1	–	7	3	–	9
East Carolina	1	–	7	3	–	9
West Division
Navy xy	7	–	1	9	–	5
Tulsa	6	–	2	10	–	3
Memphis	5	–	3	8	–	5
Houston	5	–	3	9	–	4
SMU	3	–	5	5	–	7
Tulane	1	–	7	4	–	8
Championship: Temple 34, Navy 10
$ – Conference champion; x – Division champion/co-champions; y – Championship game participant; Rankings from AP Poll

The 2016 East Carolina Pirates football team represented East Carolina University in the 2016 NCAA Division I FBS football season. They were led by a first-year head coach Scottie Montgomery and played their home games at Dowdy–Ficklen Stadium. This was East Carolina's third season as members of the East Division of the American Athletic Conference. They finished the season 3–9, 1–7 in American Athletic play to finish in a three-way tie for fourth place in the East Division.

== Schedule ==
Date	Time	Opponent	Site	TV	Result	Attendance
September 3	6:00 p.m.	Western Carolina*	Dowdy–Ficklen Stadium; Greenville, NC	ESPN3	W 52–7	44,161
September 10	Noon	NC State*	Dowdy–Ficklen Stadium; Greenville, NC (Victory Barrel)	ESPNU	W 33–30	50,719
September 17	4:00 p.m.	at South Carolina*	Williams-Brice Stadium; Columbia, SC	SECN	L 15–20	80,384
September 24	12:30 p.m.	at Virginia Tech*	Lane Stadium; Blacksburg, VA	ACCN	L 17–54	63,712
October 1	12:00 p.m.	UCF	Dowdy–Ficklen Stadium; Greenville, NC	CBSSN	L 29–47	46,042
October 8	12:00 p.m.	at South Florida	Raymond James Stadium; Tampa, FL	ESPNews	L 22–38	30,397
October 22	7:00 p.m.	at Cincinnati	Nippert Stadium; Cincinnati, OH	CBSSN	L 19–31	32,022
October 29	12:00 p.m.	UConn^{†}	Dowdy–Ficklen Stadium; Greenville, NC	ESPNews	W 41–3	41,370
November 5	8:00 p.m.	at Tulsa	Chapman Stadium; Tulsa, OK	ESPNews	L 24–45	17,557
November 12	12:00 p.m.	SMU	Dowdy–Ficklen Stadium; Greenville, NC	ESPNews	L 31–55	42,908
November 19‡	4:00 p.m.	Navy	Dowdy–Ficklen Stadium; Greenville, NC	ESPNews	L 31–66	39,480
November 26	7:30 p.m.	at Temple	Lincoln Financial Field; Philadelphia, PA	ESPNews	L 10–37	28,373
*Non-conference game; ^{†}Homecoming; All times are in Eastern time

Schedule source:

Note: ‡ The game vs. Navy was originally scheduled for October 13 (Thursday) but was postponed due to flooding from Hurricane Matthew; it was rescheduled to Saturday, November 19.

== Game summaries ==
=== Western Carolina ===
	1	2	3	4	Total
Catamounts	0	7	0	0	7
Pirates	10	21	21	0	52

=== NC State ===
	1	2	3	4	Total
Wolfpack	0	20	3	7	30
Pirates	9	10	7	7	33

=== At South Carolina ===
	1	2	3	4	Total
Pirates	3	3	0	9	15
Gamecocks	17	0	0	3	20

=== At Virginia Tech ===
	1	2	3	4	Total
Pirates	0	0	14	3	17
Hokies	14	24	9	7	54

=== UCF ===
	1	2	3	4	Total
Knights	0	16	7	24	47
Pirates	0	7	14	8	29

This game was notable for about a score of the band members taking a knee during the national anthem. It received widespread coverage, including on CNN, Fox News, and NBC.

=== At South Florida ===
	1	2	3	4	Total
Pirates	3	3	7	9	22
Bulls	7	10	7	14	38

=== At Cincinnati ===
	1	2	3	4	Total
Pirates	3	0	10	6	19
Bearcats	7	7	10	7	31

=== UConn ===
	1	2	3	4	Total
Huskies	0	3	0	0	3
Pirates	7	7	17	10	41

=== At Tulsa ===
	1	2	3	4	Total
Pirates	7	0	10	7	24
Golden Hurricane	14	10	14	7	45

=== SMU ===
	1	2	3	4	Total
Mustangs	10	28	10	7	55
Pirates	7	17	0	7	31

=== Navy ===
	1	2	3	4	Total
Midshipmen	7	24	21	14	66
Pirates	14	3	14	0	31

=== At Temple ===
	1	2	3	4	Total
Pirates	7	0	0	3	10
Owls	7	14	6	10	37

== Roster ==
2016 East Carolina Pirates football team roster
Players
Coaches
Offense

Pos.	#	Name	Class
WR	1	Deondre Farrier	Fr
RB	3	Anthony Scott	Jr
WR	4	Malik Gray	So
QB	5	Gardner Minshew	So
WR	6	Jeffrey Coprich	Jr
WR	7	Zay Jones	Sr
WR	8	Tahj Deans	Fr
QB	9	Philip Nelson	Sr
WR	11	James Summers	Sr
QB	13	Reid Herring	Fr
WR	14	Brandon Bishop	Sr
WR	15	Terrell Green	So
WR	19	Curtis Burston	So
WR	23	Quay Johnson	Jr
RB	24	Derrell Scott	So
RB	25	Devin Anderson	So
RB	28	Hussein Howe	Fr
RB	33	Shawn Furlow	So
TE	34	Devaris Brunson	Sr
TE	46	Dalton Montgomery	Fr
WR	49	Brian Hardy	Sr
OL	52	Kyle Erickson	So
OL	55	Garrett McGhin	So
OL	60	Austin Lee	Fr
OL	62	Brandon Smith	Jr
OL	63	Jaison Fournet	Fr
OL	64	Des Barmore	So
OL	65	J.T. Boyd	Sr
OL	66	Erik Lenzen	So
OL	67	D'Ante Smith	Fr
OL	68	Jack Doyle	Fr
OL	70	Cortez Herrin	Fr
OL	72	Jared Huneycutt	Fr
OL	73	Christian Matau	Jr
OL	74	Justin Sandifer	Jr
OL	75	Sean Bailey	Fr
OL	75	Bladen Gatling	Sr
OL	76	Branden Pena	Jr
OL	77	Will Dancy	Sr
OL	78	Messiah Rice	So
TE	80	Anthony Watley	Fr
WR	81	Jimmy Williams	Sr
WR	83	Cam Marshmon	Fr
WR	85	Davon Grayson	Sr
TE	86	Stephen Baggett	Jr
TE	87	Beau Huffman	So
WR	88	Trevon Brown	Jr
WR	89	Jonte Leaston	Fr

Defense

Pos.	#	Name	Class
OLB	1	Dayon Pratt	Sr
DB	2	Xavier Smith	Jr
DB	3	Travon Simmons	Jr
DB	5	Corey Seargent	So
DB	6	DaShawn Benton	Sr
MLB	7	Jordan Williams	Jr
DB	8	Bobby Fulp	Jr
OLB	10	Yiannis Bowden	So
DB	12	Javontay Smith	Fr
MLB	13	Pat Green	Jr
DB	14	Travis Phillips	Jr
DB	20	Austin Teague	Jr
MLB	21	Ray Tillman	Jr
DB	22	Terrell Richardson	Sr
OLB	24	C.J. Maybin	Fr
DB	26	Colby Gore	Fr
DB	27	Tim Irvin	So
MLB	30	Joe Carter	So
DB	31	Keyshawn Canady	Fr
DB	32	Marquel King	So
MLB	34	Devin Carlos	Jr
DB	35	Chris Love	Jr
DB	37	Trevian Hicks	Jr
DB	39	DaShaun Amos	Sr
MLB	41	Tony Baird	Fr
DB	42	Devon Sutton	Fr
MLB	43	Drayvon Fairley	Sr
LB	44	Kendall Futrell	Fr
DB	45	Kenyon Taylor	Fr
LB	46	Chance Purvis	Fr
MLB	48	Anthony Gutierrez	Jr
DL	50	Shaun James	So
LB	51	Aaron Ramseur	Fr
MLB	53	Michael Swift	So
DL	54	Anthony Orr	Sr
MLB	55	Cam White	Sr
DL	56	Demetri McGill	Sr
OLB	57	Joe Allely	Jr
DL	59	Chandon Hickerson	Fr
DL	69	Justin Brown	So
DL	89	Raequan Purvis	Fr
DL	90	Randall Anderson	Jr
DL	92	Mike Myers	Jr
DL	93	Jalen Price	Fr
DL	94	Alex Turner	Fr
DL	95	Bennett Boateng	So
OLB	96	Kiante Anderson	Jr
DL	97	Demage Bailey	Jr
DL	98	Joshon Perry	Jr
DL	99	Fred Presley	Sr
DB		Dedrick Hawkins	Fr

Special teams

Pos.	#	Name	Class
PK	38	Davis Plowman	Sr
P	40	Worth Gregory	Sr
LS	47	Anthony Ratliff	Fr
LS	61	Colton Oliver	Jr
PK	91	Caleb Pratt	So
PK	98	Jake Verity	Fr

Head coach

- Scottie Montgomery

Coordinators/assistant coaches

- Deke Adams – Assistant Coach - Defensive Line
- Ryan Anderson – Assistant Coach - Inside Linebackers
- Antonio King – Assistant Coach - Running Backs
- Phil McGeoghan – Assistant Coach - Wide Receivers
- Shannon Moore – Assistant Coach - Special Teams Coordinator/Tight Ends
- Tony Petersen – Assistant Coach - Offensive Coordinator/Quarterbacks
- Kenwick Thompson – Assistant Coach - Defensive Coordinator/Outside Linebackers
- Rick Smith – Assistant Head Coach - Secondary
- Geep Wade – Assistant Coach - Offensive Line
- David Mackie – Quality Control Coordinator/Defense
- Damon Magazu – Graduate Assistant Coach/Defense
- Brandon Williams – Graduate Assistant Coach/Defense
- Chris Cook – Quality Control Coordinator/Offense
- Phillip Mitchell – Graduate Assistant Coach/Offense
- Donovan Varner – Graduate Assistant Coach/Offense
- Garrett VanHoy – Student Assistant Coach
- Hunter Williams – Student Assistant Coach
- Terrell Smith – Assistant AD/Football Operations
- Brian Overton – Director of Player Development
- Ethan Johnson – Director of Player Personnel
- Alex Folken – Assistant Director of Player Personnel
- Sedrick Irvin – Coordinator of Football Administration
- Jeff Connors – Assistant Athletics Director/Strength and Conditioning
- Ann Hoggard – Administrative Assistant/Scottie Montgomery
- Brittany Harward – Administrative Assistant/Defense

Legend

- (C) Team captain
- (S) Suspended
- (I) Ineligible
- Injured
- Redshirt

Roster
