= 2016 UConn Huskies football team =

American college football season

2016 UConn Huskies football
- Conference: American Athletic Conference
- East Division
- Record: 3–9 (1–7 AAC)
- Head coach: Bob Diaco (3rd season)
- Offensive coordinator: Frank Verducci (2nd season; first 9 games); David Corley Jr. (interim; last 3 games)
- Offensive scheme: Spread
- Defensive coordinator: Anthony Poindexter (2nd season)
- Base defense: 3–4
- Home stadium: Pratt & Whitney Stadium at Rentschler Field

2016 American Athletic Conference football standings
	Conf.			Overall
Team	W		L	W		L
East Division
Temple xy$	7	–	1	10	–	4
No. 19 South Florida x	7	–	1	11	–	2
UCF	4	–	4	6	–	7
Cincinnati	1	–	7	4	–	8
UConn	1	–	7	3	–	9
East Carolina	1	–	7	3	–	9
West Division
Navy xy	7	–	1	9	–	5
Tulsa	6	–	2	10	–	3
Memphis	5	–	3	8	–	5
Houston	5	–	3	9	–	4
SMU	3	–	5	5	–	7
Tulane	1	–	7	4	–	8
Championship: Temple 34, Navy 10
$ – Conference champion; x – Division champion/co-champions; y – Championship game participant; Rankings from AP Poll

The 2016 UConn Huskies football team represented the University of Connecticut (UConn) as a member of the American Athletic Conference (AAC) during the 2016 NCAA Division I FBS football season. Led by Bob Diaco in his third and final season as head coach, the Huskies compiled an overall record of 3–9 with a mark of 1–7 in conference play, placing in a three-way tie for fourth at the bottom of the standings in the AAC's East Division. The team played home games at Pratt & Whitney Stadium at Rentschler Field in East Hartford, Connecticut.

== Schedule ==
Date	Time	Opponent	Site	TV	Result	Attendance
September 1	7:00 p.m.	Maine*	Pratt & Whitney Stadium at Rentschler Field; East Hartford, CT	ASN	W 24–21	29,377
September 10	3:30 p.m.	at Navy	Navy–Marine Corps Memorial Stadium; Annapolis, MD	CBSSN	L 24–28	31,501
September 17	1:30 p.m.	Virginia*	Pratt & Whitney Stadium at Rentschler Field; East Hartford, CT	SNY	W 13–10	31,036
September 24	1:00 p.m.	Syracuse*	Pratt & Whitney Stadium at Rentschler Field; East Hartford, CT (rivalry)	CBSSN	L 24–31	31,899
September 29	8:00 p.m.	at No. 6 Houston	TDECU Stadium; Houston, TX	ESPN	L 14–42	40,873
October 8	11:30 a.m.	Cincinnati	Pratt & Whitney Stadium at Rentschler Field; East Hartford, CT	CBSSN	W 20–9	24,169
October 15	7:00 p.m.	at South Florida	Raymond James Stadium; Tampa, FL	CBSSN	L 27–42	30,297
October 22	12:00 p.m.	UCF^{†}	Pratt & Whitney Stadium at Rentschler Field; East Hartford, CT (Civil Conflict)	ESPNews	L 16–24	28,008
October 29	12:00 p.m.	at East Carolina	Dowdy–Ficklen Stadium; Greenville, NC	ESPNews	L 3–41	41,370
November 4	7:00 p.m.	Temple	Pratt & Whitney Stadium at Rentschler Field; East Hartford, CT	ESPN2	L 0–21	22,316
November 19	1:00 p.m.	at Boston College*	Alumni Stadium; Chestnut Hill, MA	ACCN Extra	L 0–30	36,220
November 26	4:00 p.m.	Tulane	Pratt & Whitney Stadium at Rentschler Field; East Hartford, CT	ESPNews	L 13–38	20,764
*Non-conference game; ^{†}Homecoming; Rankings from AP Poll released prior to the game; All times are in Eastern time

== Game summaries ==
=== Maine ===
Maine Black Bears at Connecticut Huskies – Game summary

Quarter	1	2	3	4	Total
Black Bears	7	0	7	7	21
Huskies	0	7	7	10	24

at Pratt & Whitney Stadium at Rentschler Field • East Hartford, Connecticut

- Date: September 1, 2016
- Game time: 7:06 p.m. EST, Duration: 3:12
- Game weather: Temperature: 76 °F (24 °C) • Wind: Calm • Weather: Warm and humid
- Game attendance: 29,377
- Referee: Char. Lamertina • Umpire: Bill Lamkin • Linesman: Jim Casey • Line Judge: Stephen Ray • Back Judge: Byron Adams • Field Judge: Rick Santilli • Side Judge: Ken Bushey • Center Judge: Joe Clarkson
- TV announcers (ASN): Mike Gleason (Play-by-play), Andy Gresh (color) & Hali Oughton (sideline)

Game information

First Quarter

- MAINE • 00:50 • Josh Mack 20 yd pass from Dan Collins (Pat Leonard kick) • MAINE 7–0

Second Quarter

- UCONN • 06:55 • Ron Johnson 1 yd run (Bobby Puyol kick) • TIED 7–7

Third Quarter

- UCONN • 03:10 • Ron Johnson 21 yd run (Bobby Puyol kick) • UCONN 14–7
- MAINE • 00:01 • Jaleel Reed 40 yd pass from Dan Collins (Pat Leonard kick) • TIED 14–14

Fourth Quarter

- MAINE • 09:56 • Najee Goode 74 yd fumble recovery (Pat Leonard kick) • MAINE 21–14
- UCONN • 06:36 • Arkeel Newsome 2 yd run (Bobby Puyol kick) • TIED 21–21
- UCONN • 00:11 • Bobby Puyol 37 yd field goal • UCONN 24–21

Top Passers

- MAINE – Dan Collins 19/33, 269 Yds, 2 TD
- UCONN – Bryant Shirreffs 16/23, 162 YD

Top Rushers

- MAINE – Joah Mack 9 attempts, 30 yards
- UCONN – Bryant Shirreffs 20 attempts, 114 yards

Top Receiving

- MAINE – Jaleel Reed 8 receptions, 169 yards, 1 TD
- UCONN – Noel Thomas 9 receptions, 70 yards

Top Tacklers

- MAINE – Tshiman Mulumba 12 tackles
- UCONN – Vontae Diggs 9 tackles

=== Navy ===
Connecticut Huskies at Navy Midshipmen – Game summary

Quarter	1	2	3	4	Total
Huskies	0	7	14	3	24
Midshipmen	7	14	0	7	28

at Navy–Marine Corps Memorial Stadium • Annapolis, Maryland

- Date: September 10, 2016
- Game time: 3:32 p.m. EST, Duration: 3:08
- Game weather: Temperature: 86 °F (30 °C) • Wind: SE 12 • Weather: Clear, feels like 96
- Game attendance: 31,501
- Referee: Adam Savoie • Umpire: Paul Myers • Linesman: Dan Harrington • Line Judge: Tod Reese • Back Judge: Tom Fimmen • Field Judge: James Reif • Side Judge: Alex Moore • Center Judge: Marcus Woods
- TV announcers (CBSSN): John Sadak (Play-by-play), Randy Cross (color) & Sheehan Stanwick Burch (sideline)

Game information

First Quarter

- NAVY • 04:52 • Chris High 4 yd run (B Moehring kick) • NAVY 7–0

Second Quarter

- NAVY • 10:35 • Will Worth 1 yd run (B Moehring kick) • NAVY 14–0
- NAVY • 05:36 • Alohi Gilman 2 yd fumble recovery (B Moehring kick) • NAVY 21–0
- UCONN • 01:10 • Noel Thomas 34 yd pass from Bryant Shirreffs (Bobby Puyol kick) • NAVY 21–7

Third Quarter

- UCONN • 08:07 • Ron Johnson 3 yd run (Bobby Puyol kick) • NAVY 21–14
- UCONN • 02:39 • Jamar Summers 86 yd fumble recovery (Bobby Puyol kick) • TIED 21–21

Fourth Quarter

- UCONN • 09:08 • Bobby Puyol 38 yd field goal • UCONN 24–21
- NAVY • 03:08 • Will Worth 1 yd run (B Moehring kick) • NAVY 28–24

Top Passers

- NAVY – Will Worth 6/8, 130 yards
- UCONN – Bryant Shirreffs 23/26, 239 yards, 1 TD

Top Rushers

- NAVY – Dishan Romine 9 attempts, 76 yards
- UCONN – Ron Johnson 10 attempts, 33 yards, 1 TD

Top Receiving

- NAVY – Jamir Tillman 4 receptions, 75 yards
- UCONN – Noel Thomas 11 receptions, 116 yards, 1 TD

Top Tacklers

- NAVY – Alohi Gilman 10 tackles
- UCONN – Matt Walsh 12 tackles

=== Virginia ===
Virginia Cavaliers at Connecticut Huskies – Game summary

Quarter	1	2	3	4	Total
Cavaliers	3	7	0	0	10
Huskies	0	3	0	10	13

at Pratt & Whitney Stadium at Rentschler Field • East Hartford, Connecticut

- Date: September 17, 2016
- Game time: 1:36 p.m. EST, Duration: 3:11
- Game weather: Temperature: 76 °F (24 °C) • Wind: S 10 • Weather: Sunny and pleasant
- Game attendance: 31,036
- Referee: Jeff Maconaghy • Umpire: Rich McMahan • Linesman: Matt Fitzgerald • Line judge: Hugh Campbell • Back judge: Keith Parham • Field judge: Kip Johnson • Side judge: Rich Street • Center judge: James Cole
- TV announcers (SNY): Eric Frede (Play-by-play) & Andy Gresh (color)

Game information

First Quarter

- VA • 07:18 • Alex Furbank 23 yd field goal • VA 3–0

Second Quarter

- VA • 12:42 • Albert Reid 9 yd run (Alex Furbank kick) • VA 10–0
- UCONN • 04:43 • Bobby Puyol 21 yd field goal • VA 10–3

Fourth Quarter

- UCONN • 07:55 • Bryant Shirreffs 1 yd run (Bobby Puyol kick) • TIED 10–10
- UCONN • 01:33 • Bobby Puyol 43 yd field goal • UCONN 13–10

Top Passers

- VA – Kurt Benkert 23/42, 241 yards
- UCONN – Bryant Shirreffs 13/24, 154 yards

Top Rushers

- VA – Albert Reid 15 attempts, 73 yards, 1 TD
- UCONN – Arkeel Newsome 13 attempts, 77 yards

Top Receiving

- VA – Keeon Johnson 6 receptions, 73 yards
- UCONN – Noel Thomas 6 receptions, 91 yards

Top Tacklers

- VA – Quin Blanding 11 tackles
- UCONN – Obi Melifonwu 11 tackles

=== Syracuse ===
Syracuse Orange at Connecticut Huskies – Game summary

Quarter	1	2	3	4	Total
Orange	14	3	7	7	31
Huskies	0	14	3	7	24

at Pratt & Whitney Stadium at Rentschler Field • East Hartford, Connecticut

- Date: September 24, 2016
- Game time: 1:02 p.m. EST, Duration: 3:22
- Game weather: Temperature: 65 °F (18 °C) • Wind: NW 10 • Weather: Sunny and pleasant
- Game attendance: 31,899
- Referee: Jerry Magallanes • Umpire: Troy Riley • Linesman: Tracy Lynch • Line judge: Jim Slayton • Back judge: Paul Vargo • Field judge: Jim Biddle • Side judge: Mike McCarthy • Center judge: Sean Geraghty
- TV announcers (CBSSN): Dave Ryan (Play-by-play), Corey Chavous (color) & Melanie Collins (sideline)

Game information

First Quarter

- CUSE • 14:09 • Amba Etta-Tawo 57 yd pass from Eric Dungey (Cole Murphy kick) • CUSE 7–0
- CUSE • 10:48 • Amba Etta-Tawo 30 yd pass from Eric Dungey (Cole Murphy kick) • CUSE 14–0

Second Quarter

- UCONN • 06:05 • Ron Johnson 2 yd run (Bobby Puyol kick) • CUSE 14–7
- UCONN • 00:34 • Arkeel Newsome 6 yd run (Bobby Puyol kick) • TIED 14–14
- CUSE • 00:00 • Cole Murphy 47 yd field goal • CUSE 17–14

Third Quarter

- UCONN • 05:11 • Bobby Puyol 27 yd field goal • TIED 17–17
- CUSE • 00:49 • Cordell Hudson 22 yd interception return (Cole Murphy kick) • CUSE 24–17

Fourth Quarter

- CUSE • 02:14 • Eric Dungey 6 yd run (Cole Murphy kick) • CUSE 31–17
- UCONN • 00:33 • Tyler Davis 6 yd pass from Bryant Shirreffs (Bobby Puyol kick) • CUSE 31–24

Top Passers

- CUSE – Eric Dungey 26/40, 407 yards, 2 TD
- UCONN – Bryant Shirreffs 27/45, 264 yards, 1 TD

Top Rushers

- CUSE – Dontae Strickland 14 attempts, 51 yards
- UCONN – Arkeel Newsome 15 attempts, 81 yards, 1 TD

Top Receiving

- CUSE – Amba Etta-Tawo 12 receptions, 270 yards, 2 TD
- UCONN – Noel Thomas 14 receptions, 111 yards

Top Tacklers

- CUSE – Zaire Franklin 14 tackles
- UCONN – Obi Melifonwu 11 tackles

=== Houston ===
Connecticut Huskies at Houston Cougars – Game summary

Quarter	1	2	3	4	Total
Huskies	0	7	0	7	14
#6 Cougars	0	28	14	0	42

at TDECU Stadium • Houston, Texas

- Date: September 29, 2016
- Game time: 8:02 p.m. EST, Duration: 3:14
- Game weather: Temperature: 78 °F (26 °C) • Wind: N 11 • Weather: Sunny and clear
- Game attendance: 40,873
- Referee: C. Lamertina • Umpire: Bill Lamkin • Linesman: Jim Casey • Line judge: Jeffrey Cooney • Back judge: M. Griffith • Field judge: Rick Santilli • Side judge: Mark Windham • Center judge: A. Calabrese
- TV announcers (ESPN): Dave Flemming (Play-by-play), Jesse Palmer (color) & Laura Rutledge (sideline)

Game information

Second Quarter

- HOU • 14:20 • Greg Ward Jr. 30 yd run (Ty Cummings kick) • HOU 7–0
- HOU • 09:11 • Dillon Birden 1 yd run (Ty Cummings kick) • HOU 14–0
- HOU • 05:36 • T McCloskey 3 yd pass from Greg Ward Jr. (Ty Cummings kick) • HOU 21–0
- HOU • 01:37 • Steven Dunbar 15 yd pass from Greg Ward Jr. (Ty Cummings kick) • HOU 28–0
- UCONN • 00:30 • Noel Thomas 62 yd pass from Bryant Shirreffs (Bobby Puyol kick) • HOU 28–7

Third Quarter

- HOU • 11:47 • Greg Ward Jr. 10 yd run (Ty Cummings kick) • HOU 35–7
- HOU • 04:58 • Linell Bonner 4 yd pass from Greg Ward Jr. (Ty Cummings kick) • HOU 42–7

Fourth Quarter

- UCONN • 08:42 • Bryant Shirreffs 1 yd run (Bobby Puyol kick) • HOU 42–14

Top Passers

- HOU – Greg Ward Jr. 32/38, 389 yards, 3 TD
- UCONN – Bryant Shirreffs 13/29, 239 yards, 1 TD

Top Rushers

- HOU – Greg Ward Jr. 12 attempts, 65 yards, 2 TD
- UCONN – Noel Thomas 3 attempts, 22 yards

Top Receiving

- HOU – Linell Bonner 12 receptions, 159 yards, 1 TD
- UCONN – Noel Thomas 6 receptions, 135 yards, 1 TD

Top Tacklers

- HOU – K Williams 5 tackles
- UCONN – Vontae Diggs 12 tackles

=== Cincinnati ===
Cincinnati Bearcats at Connecticut Huskies – Game summary

Quarter	1	2	3	4	Total
Bearcats	0	9	0	0	9
Huskies	0	7	10	3	20

at Pratt & Whitney Stadium at Rentschler Field • East Hartford, Connecticut

- Date: October 8, 2016
- Game time: 11:32 a.m. EST, Duration: 3:29
- Game weather: Temperature: 58 °F (14 °C) • Wind: Calm • Weather: Crisp and pleasant
- Game attendance: 24,169
- Referee: Michael Roche • Umpire: Jeffrey Akers • Linesman: Brian Perry • Line judge: Jeff Cooney • Back judge: Victor Firth • Field judge: Glen Wilson • Side judge: Ryan Robinson • Center judge: Terry Killens
- TV announcers (CBSSN): Dave Ryan (Play-by-play), Corey Chavous (color) & Melanie Collins (sideline)
- Box Score

Game information

Second Quarter

- CIN • 13:10 • Josh Pasley 25 yd field goal • CIN 3–0
- CIN • 11:26 • Josh Pasley 43 yd field goal • CIN 6–0
- CIN • 07:05 • Josh Pasley 26 yd field goal • CIN 9–0
- UCONN • 00:28 • Tyraiq Beals 59 yd pass from Bryant Shirreffs (Bobby Puyol kick) • CIN 9–7

Third Quarter

- UCONN • 06:29 • Noel Thomas 26 yd pass from Bryant Shirreffs (Bobby Puyol kick) • UCONN 14–9
- UCONN • 00:41 • Bobby Puyol 30 yd field goal • UCONN 17–9

Fourth Quarter

- UCONN • 03:08 • Bobby Puyol 23 yd field goal • UCONN 20–9

Top Passers

- CIN – Hayden Moore 29/56, 315 yards
- UCONN – Bryant Shirreffs 18/33, 224 yards, 2 TD

Top Rushers

- CIN – Tion Green 6 attempts, 15 yards
- UCONN – Arkeel Newsome 14 attempts, 116 yards

Top Receiving

- CIN – Devin Gray 9 receptions, 98 yards
- UCONN – Noel Thomas 9 receptions, 108 yards, 1 TD

Top Tacklers

- CIN – Eric Wilson 11 tackles
- UCONN – Jhavon Williams 9 tackles

=== South Florida ===
Connecticut Huskies at South Florida Bulls – Game summary

Quarter	1	2	3	4	Total
Huskies	3	0	14	10	27
Bulls	7	7	7	21	42

at Raymond James Stadium • Tampa, Florida

- Date: October 15, 2016
- Game time: 7:02 p.m. EST, Duration: 3:33
- Game weather: Temperature: 81 °F (27 °C) • Wind: ENE 6 • Weather: Partly Cloudy
- Game attendance: 30,297
- Referee: Adam Savoie • Umpire: Paul Myers • Linesman: Dan Harrington • Line judge: Tod Reese • Back judge: Tom Fimmen • Field judge: James Reif • Side judge: Ryan Robinson • Center judge: Marcus Woods
- TV announcers (CBSSN): Dave Ryan (Play-by-play), Corey Chavous (color) & Melanie Collins (sideline)
- Box Score

Game information

First Quarter

- UCONN • 08:04 • Bobby Puyol 26 yd field goal • UCONN 3–0
- USF • 07:35 • Quinton Flowers 54 yd run (Emili Nadelman kick) • USF 7–3

Second Quarter

- USF • 02:22 • Quinton Flowers 8 yd run (Emili Nadelman kick) • USF 14–3

Third Quarter

- UCONN • 13:41 • Arkeel Newsome 70 yd pass from Bryant Shirreffs (Bobby Puyol kick) • USF 14–10
- UCONN • 12:38 • Arkeel Newsome 4 yd run (Bobby Puyol kick) • UCONN 17–14
- USF • 05:30 • Quinton Flowers 8 yd run (Emili Nadelman kick) • USF 21–17

Fourth Quarter

- USF • 12:38 • Marq Scantling 26 yd pass from Quinton Flowers (Emili Nadelman kick) • USF 28–17
- UCONN • 08:12 • Bobby Puyol 26 yd field goal • USF 28–20
- USF • 04:21 • Mitch Wilcox 26 yd pass from Quinton Flowers (Emili Nadelman kick) • USF 35–20
- USF • 02:57 • Marlon Mack 34 yd run (Emili Nadelman kick) • USF 42–20
- UCONN • 00:57 • Alec Bloom 4 yd pass from Bryant Shirreffs (Bobby Puyol kick) • USF 42–27

Top Passers

- USF – Quinton Flowers 23/37, 213 yards, 2 TD
- UCONN – Bryant Shirreffs 22/39, 306 yards, 2 TD

Top Rushers

- USF – Quinton Flowers 16 attempts, 157 yards, 3 TD
- UCONN – Arkeel Newsome 15 attempts, 72 yards, 1 TD

Top Receiving

- USF – Rodney Adams 7 receptions, 43 yards
- UCONN – Noel Thomas 12 receptions, 127 yards

Top Tacklers

- USF – Auggie Sanchez 11 tackles
- UCONN – Junior Joseph 9 tackles

=== UCF ===
UCF Knights at Connecticut Huskies – Game summary

Quarter	1	2	3	4	Total
Knights	0	14	7	3	24
Huskies	6	10	0	0	16

at Pratt & Whitney Stadium at Rentschler Field • East Hartford, Connecticut

- Date: October 22, 2016
- Game time: 12:01 p.m. EST, Duration: 3:18
- Game weather: Temperature: 51 °F (11 °C) • Wind: NW 12 • Weather: Rainy and windy
- Game attendance: 28,008
- Referee: Tracy Jones • Umpire: Nicholas Pergine • Linesman: Daniel Shelton • Line judge: Colin Gaynor • Back judge: James Downey • Field judge: Jim Smith • Side judge: Matt Waldron • Center judge: Mark Mobra
- TV announcers (ESPNews): Mike Corey (Play-by-play) & Rene Ingoglia (color)
- Box Score

Game information

First Quarter

- UCONN • 09:01 • Bobby Puyol 22 yd field goal • UCONN 3–0
- UCONN • 03:29 • Bobby Puyol 33 yd field goal • UCONN 6–0

Second Quarter

- UCONN • 09:41 • Arkeel Newsome 3 yd run (Bobby Puyol kick) • UCONN 13–0
- UCF • 06:50 • D Snelson 22 yd pass from M Milton (Matthew Wright kick) • UCONN 13–7
- UCONN • 01:25 • Bobby Puyol 35 yd field goal • UCONN 16–7
- UCF • 00:01 • Jordan Akins 19 yd pass from M Milton (Matthew Wright kick) • UCONN 16–14

Third Quarter

- UCF • 12:27 • Adrian Killins 39 yd pass from M Milton (Matthew Wright kick) • UCF 21–16

Fourth Quarter

- UCF • 14:15 • Matthew Wright 50 yd field goal • UCF 24–16

Top Passers

- UCF – M Milton 29/45, 317 yards, 3 TD
- UCONN – Bryant Shirreffs 18/34, 242 yards

Top Rushers

- UCF – D Wilson 11 attempts, 57 yards
- UCONN – Arkeel Newsome 21 attempts, 101 yards, 1 TD

Top Receiving

- UCF – D Snelson 5 receptions, 63 yards, 1 TD
- UCONN – Noel Thomas 9 receptions, 165 yards

Top Tacklers

- UCF – Shqm Griffin 10 tackles
- UCONN – Jhavon Williams 9 tackles

=== East Carolina ===
Connecticut Huskies at East Carolina Pirates – Game summary

Quarter	1	2	3	4	Total
Huskies	0	3	0	0	3
Pirates	7	7	17	10	41

at Dowdy–Ficklen Stadium • Greenville, North Carolina

- Date: October 29, 2016
- Game time: 12:01 p.m. EST, Duration: 3:15
- Game weather: Temperature: 71 °F (22 °C) • Wind: SSW 7 • Weather: Sunny
- Game attendance: 41,370
- Referee: Michael Roche • Umpire: Hilbert Byers • Linesman: Adam Loudin • Line judge: Stephen Ray • Back judge: M. Griffith • Field judge: Ben Vasconcells • Side judge: Ken Bushey • Center judge: Mike Viles
- TV announcers (ESPNews): Mike Couzens (Play-by-play) & Dan Hawkins (color)
- Box Score

Game information

First Quarter

- ECU • 08:38 • James Summers 4 yd pass from Philip Nelson (Davis Plowman kick) • ECU 7–0

Second Quarter

- UCONN • 03:14 • Bobby Puyol 34 yd field goal • ECU 7–3
- ECU • 00:45 • Zay Jones 2 yd pass from Philip Nelson (Davis Plowman kick) • ECU 14–3

Third Quarter

- ECU • 12:42 • Davis Plowman 39 yd field goal • ECU 17–3
- ECU • 05:52 • James Summers 1 yd run (Davis Plowman kick) • ECU 24–3
- ECU • 05:22 • Zay Jones 3 yd pass from Philip Nelson (Davis Plowman kick) • ECU 31–3

Fourth Quarter

- ECU • 14:52 • Jimmy Williams 31 yd pass from James Summers (Davis Plowman kick) • ECU 38–3
- ECU • 08:30 • Davis Plowman 25 yd field goal • ECU 41–3

Top Passers

- ECU – Philip Nelson 29/41, 253 yards, 2 TD
- UCONN – Bryant Shirreffs 16/30, 180 yards

Top Rushers

- ECU – James Summers 19 attempts, 84 yards, 1 TD
- UCONN – Bryant Shirreffs 14 attempts, 46 yards

Top Receiving

- ECU – Zay Jones 19 receptions, 185 yards, 1 TD
- UCONN – Noel Thomas 7 receptions, 135 yards

Top Tacklers

- ECU – Jrdn Williams 9 tackles
- UCONN – Obi Melifonwu 10 tackles

=== Temple ===
Temple Owls at Connecticut Huskies – Game summary

Quarter	1	2	3	4	Total
Owls	21	0	0	0	21
Huskies	0	0	0	0	0

at Pratt & Whitney Stadium at Rentschler Field • East Hartford, Connecticut

- Date: November 4, 2016
- Game time: 7:02 p.m. EST, Duration: 2:54
- Game weather: Temperature: 53 °F (12 °C) • Wind: NW 7 • Weather: Cool and clear
- Game attendance: 22,316
- Referee: Rick Loumiet • Umpire: Hilbert Byers • Linesman: Todd Riddick • Line judge: Baron Ballester • Back judge: MichaelGriffith • Field judge: Glenn Crowther • Side judge: Bruce Williams • Center judge: Tony Calabrese
- TV announcers (ESPN2): Adam Amin (Play-by-play), Mack Brown (color) & Molly McGrath (sideline)
- Box Score

Game information

First Quarter

- TEM • 11:11 • Jahad Thomas 23 yd pass from Phillip Walker (Aaron Boumerhi kick) • TEM 7–0
- TEM • 07:39 • Jahad Thomas 10 yd pass from Phillip Walker (Aaron Boumerhi kick) • TEM 14–0
- TEM • 00:20 • Romond Deloatch 18 yd pass from Phillip Walker (Aaron Boumerhi kick) • TEM 21–0

Top Passers

- TEM – Phillip Walker 12/18, 215 yards, 3 TD
- UCONN – Donovan Williams 12/21, 69 yards

Top Rushers

- TEM – R Armstead 20 attempts, 133 yards
- UCONN – Donovan Williams 16 attempts, 66 yards

Top Receiving

- TEM – Ventell Bryant 4 receptions, 82 yards
- UCONN – Noel Thomas 4 receptions, 32 yards

Top Tacklers

- TEM – Haason Reddick 8 tackles
- UCONN – Obi Melifonwu 9 tackles

=== Boston College ===
Connecticut Huskies at Boston College Eagles – Game summary

Quarter	1	2	3	4	Total
Huskies	0	0	0	0	0
Eagles	0	10	10	10	30

at Alumni Stadium • Chestnut Hill, Massachusetts

- Date: November 19, 2016
- Game time: 1:00 p.m. EST, Duration: 3:08
- Game weather: Temperature: 54 °F (12 °C) • Wind: ENE 6 • Weather: Mostly Sunny
- Game attendance: 36,220
- Referee: Todd LaPenta • Umpire: Greg Brenner • Linesman: Brian Perry • Line judge: Jeffrey Cooney • Back judge: Victory Firth • Field judge: Chris Bikowski • Side judge: Glen Wilson • Center judge: Terry Killens
- TV announcers (ACCN Extra): Michael Reghi (Play-by-play) & Tom O’Brien (color)
- Box Score

Game information

Second Quarter

- BC • 10:36 • D Jones 1 yd run (M Knoll kick) • BC 7–0
- BC • 01:36 • M Knoll 35 yd field goal • BC 10–0

Third Quarter

- BC • 08:25 • M Walker 10 yd pass from P Towles (M Knoll kick) • BC 17–0
- BC • 02:55 • M Knoll 24 yd field goal • BC 20–0

Fourth Quarter

- BC • 14:41 • M Milano 19 yd interception return (M Knoll kick) • BC 27–0
- BC • 07:40 • M Knoll 39 yd field goal • BC 30–0

Top Passers

- BC – P Towles 14/19, 183 yards, 1 TD
- UCONN – Donovan Williams 13/29, 127 yards

Top Rushers

- BC – D Jones 11 attempts, 40 yards, 1 TD
- UCONN – Ron Johnson 2 attempts, 6 yards

Top Receiving

- BC – J Smith 4 receptions, 87 yards
- UCONN – Noel Thomas 4 receptions, 29 yards

Top Tacklers

- BC – C Strachan 6 tackles
- UCONN – Obi Melifonwu 11 tackles

=== Tulane ===
Tulane Green Wave at Connecticut Huskies – Game summary

Quarter	1	2	3	4	Total
Green Wave	10	14	0	14	38
Huskies	0	0	6	7	13

at Pratt & Whitney Stadium at Rentschler Field • East Hartford, Connecticut

- Date: November 26, 2016
- Game time: 4:02 p.m. EST, Duration: 3:11
- Game weather: Temperature: 45 °F (7 °C) • Wind: NNW 4 • Weather: Cloudy and cool
- Game attendance: 20,764
- Referee: Rich Loumiet • Umpire: Jeffrey Akers • Linesman: Todd Riddick • Line judge: Baron Ballester • Back judge: Byron Adams • Field judge: Glenn Crowther • Side judge: Bruce Williams • Center judge: Ryan Wingers
- TV announcers (ESPNews): Chris Hassel (Play-by-play) & Matt Chatham (color)
- Box Score

Game information

First Quarter

- TULN • 10:10 • Andrew DiRocco 23 yd field goal • TULN 3–0
- TULN • 07:33 • Josh Rounds 1 yd run (Andrew DiRocco kick) • TULN 10–0

Second Quarter

- TULN • 09:02 • Josh Rounds 4 yd run (Andrew DiRocco kick) • TULN 17–0
- TULN • 03:18 • L Thompson 3 yd run (Andrew DiRocco kick) • TULN 24–0

Third Quarter

- UCONN • 06:55 • Arkeel Newsome 62 yd run (Donovan Williams rush no good) • TULN 24–6

Fourth Quarter

- TULN • 14:55 • L Thompson 1 yd run (Andrew DiRocco kick) • TULN 31–6
- UCONN • 08:31 • Arkeel Newsome 20 yd pass from Donovan Williams (Bobby Puyol kick) • TULN 31–13
- TULN • 08:21 • L Thompson 45 yd run (Andrew DiRocco kick) • TULN 38–13

Top Passers

- TULN – G Cuiellette 11/19, 166 yards
- UCONN – Donovan Williams 11/26, 104 yards, 1 TD

Top Rushers

- TULN – L Thompson 23 attempts, 108 yards, 3 TD
- UCONN – Arkeel Newsome 15 attempts, 166 yards, 1 TD

Top Receiving

- TULN – Larry Dace 4 receptions, 39 yards
- UCONN – Noel Thomas 9 receptions, 60 yards

Top Tacklers

- TULN – Eric Thomas 6 tackles
- UCONN – Obi Melifonwu 24 tackles

== Roster ==
2016 UConn Huskies football team roster
Players
Coaches
Offense

Pos.	#	Name	Class
WR	1	Hergy Mayala	So
WR	2	Tyraiq Beals	So
RB	3	Ron Johnson	Jr
QB	4	Bryant Shirreffs (C)	Jr
WR	5	Noel Thomas	Sr
QB	7	Garrett Anderson	Sr
WR	8	Aaron McLean	So
QB	9	Tyler Davis	Fr
RB	11	Nate Hopkins	Fr
QB	12	Brandon Bisack	Fr
QB	15	Donovan Williams	Fr
QB	16	Will Rishell	Jr
QB	18	Brad Westmark	So
WR	18	Brian Lemelle	Sr
WR	19	Quayvon Skanes	Fr
F	20	Jasen Rose	Fr
RB	22	Arkeel Newsome	Jr
WR	23	Keyion Dixon	Fr
RB	24	Ja'Kevious Vickers	Fr
RB	28	Tahj-Anthony Wilson	Fr
FB	34	Teddy Allmendinger	Fr
RB	44	Rick Bartone	Fr
RB	48	Jason Thompson	So
OL	53	Andreas Knappe (C)	Sr
OL	56	Nino Leone	Fr
OL	60	Ben Bonvicini	Fr
OL	61	Tom Tabur	Fr
OL	62	Tommy Hopkins	Jr
OL	63	Ryan Crozier	So
OL	65	Matt Peart	Fr
OL	67	Bryan Cespedes	Fr
OL	70	Cam DeGeorge	Fr
OL	71	Richard Levy	Sr
OL	72	Brendan Vechery	Jr
OL	73	Steve Hashemi	Jr
OL	75	Daniel Oak	So
OL	76	Harrison Newman	Fr
OL	77	Trey Rutherford	Jr
OL	78	Ian Campbell	Fr
OL	79	Kyle Schafenacker	Jr
F	80	Tommy Myers	Jr
WR	82	Mason Donaldson	Fr
WR	83	TJ Vernieri	Fr
WR	84	Bryan Coney	Fr
WR	85	Malcolm Anthony	Fr
TE	86	Alec Bloom	Jr
WR	87	Isaiah Colebrook	Fr
TE	89	Chris Lee	So
F	90	Zordan Holman	Fr
TE	94	Nicholas Lensander	Sr
TE	98	Rhakim Williams	Fr

Defense

Pos.	#	Name	Class
CB	1	Tre Bell	Jr
S	6	Eddie Hahn	Fr
CB	6	Jhavon Williams	Sr
CB	7	John Green	Sr
LB	9	William Richardson	Fr
LB	10	Cameron Stapleton	Jr
LB	11	Junior Joseph	Jr
LB	12	E.J. Levenberry	Jr
LB	13	Vontae Diggs	Jr
CB	14	Tahj Wilson-Herring	Fr
LB	15	Luke Carrezola	Jr
S	16	Brice McAllister	Jr
S	20	Obi Melifonwu	Sr
CB	21	Jamar Summers	Jr
CB	25	Tyler Coyle	Fr
S	26	Dan Romanello	Fr
CB	27	Nick Vitale	Sr
S	29	Anthony Watkins	So
LB	30	Jalen Stevens	Jr
CB	31	John Robinson IV	Fr
S	32	Aaron Garland	Fr
LB	33	Chris Britton	So
LB	35	Luke Sowa	Fr
LB	36	Matthew Walsh (C)	Sr
CB	37	Kyle Williams	Fr
LB	38	Johnny Somers	Fr
S	39	Chris Jean-Pierre	Fr
S	41	Marshé Terry	Fr
LB	45	Ryan Gilmartin	Fr
LB	46	AJ Garson	Fr
LB	47	Nazir Williams	Fr
DL	49	Dallas Parker	So
DL	50	Sheriden Lawley	So
LB	52	Richmond Williams	So
LB	54	Omaine Stephens	Sr
LB	55	Jon Hicks	Sr
DL	57	Cole Ormsby	Jr
DL	58	Philippe Okounam	Fr
DL	59	Andrew Migliaccio	Fr
LB	88	Connor Freeborn	Fr
DL	91	Felton Blackwell	Fr
DL	92	Mikal Myers (C)	Sr
DL	93	Folorunso Fatukasi	Jr
DL	94	Kevin Murphy	Fr
DL	95	Noel Brouse	Fr
DL	96	James Atkins	So
DL	99	Sean Marinan	Sr

Special teams

Pos.	#	Name	Class
K	16	Will Rishell	Jr
K	17	Bobby Puyol	Sr
K	40	Michael Tarbutt	So
P	42	Justin Wain	Sr
LS	51	Nick Zecchino	Fr
LS	66	Jeffrey Sidebotham	Fr
P	81	Brett Graham	Fr

Head coach

- Bob Diaco

Coordinators/assistant coaches

- Frank Verducci
  Offensive coordinator (games 1–9), tight ends
- Anthony Poindexter
  Defensive coordinator, safeties
- Vincent Brown
  Co-defensive coordinator, linebackers
- David Corley
  Offensive coordinator (games 10–12), running backs, special teams coordinator
- Mike Cummings
  Offensive line, co-offensive coordinator
- Erik Campbell
  Wide receivers
- Wayne Lineburg
  Quarterbacks
- Kevin Wolthausen
  Recruiting coordinator, defensive line
- Josh Reardon
  Cornerbacks, co-special team coordinator
- Matt Balis
  Strength and conditioning coordinator
- Kyle Cooper
  Graduate assistant
- Nick Lezynski
  Graduate assistant
- Chris Salvi
  Graduate assistant
- Garrett Scott
  Graduate assistant

Legend

- (C) Team captain
- (S) Suspended
- (I) Ineligible
- Injured
- Redshirt

Roster
Last update: August 9, 2016

== NFL draft ==
One Husky was selected in the 2017 NFL draft following the season.

Round	Pick	Player	Position	NFL team
2	56	Obi Melifonwu	Defensive back	Oakland Raiders
