= 2016 Military Bowl =

2016 Military Bowl presented by Northrop Grumman
- 9th Military Bowl
Temple Owls	Wake Forest Demon Deacons
(10–3)	(6–6)
The American	ACC
26	34
Head coach: Ed Foley (interim)	Head coach: Dave Clawson
AP / Coaches / CFP; 23 / 24 / 24
	1	2	3	4	Total
Temple	7	3	10	6	26
Wake Forest	14	17	0	3	34
- Date: December 27, 2016
- Season: 2016
- Stadium: Navy–Marine Corps Memorial Stadium
- Location: Annapolis, Maryland
- MVP: Wake Forest LB Thomas Brown
- Favorite: Temple by 13
- Referee: Kevin Stine (Sun Belt)
- Attendance: 26,656
- Payout: US$1,000,000

United States TV coverage
- Network: ESPN
- Announcers: TV: Jason Benetti, Kelly Stouffer, Paul Carcaterra; Radio: John Brickley, Brad Edwards

The 2016 Military Bowl was a postseason college football bowl game, played at Navy–Marine Corps Memorial Stadium in Annapolis, Maryland, on December 27, 2016. The ninth edition of the Military Bowl featured the American Athletic Conference champion Temple Owls versus the Wake Forest Demon Deacons of Atlantic Coast Conference.

== Teams ==
The game featured the Temple Owls against the Wake Forest Demon Deacons.

This was the second all-time meeting between the schools; the previous one was on November 1, 1930, when the Owls defeated the Demon Deacons by a score of 36–0.

== Game summary ==
=== Scoring summary ===
Scoring summary

Quarter	Time	Drive			Team	Scoring information	Score	
Quarter	Time	Plays	Yards	TOP	Team	Scoring information	TEM	WAKE
1	13:33	1	48	0:09	TEM	Adonis Jennings 48-yard touchdown reception from P. J. Walker, Aaron Boumerhi kick good	7	0
1	8:37	4	60	1:06	WAKE	Cam Serigne 41-yard touchdown reception from John Wolford, Mike Weaver kick good	7	7
1	5:20	4	54	0:57	WAKE	Tabari Hines 20-yard touchdown reception from John Wolford, Mike Weaver kick good	7	14
2	12:26	1	11	0:08	WAKE	Cade Carney 11-yard touchdown run, Mike Weaver kick good	7	21
2	8:34	10	62	2:08	WAKE	25-yard field goal by Mike Weaver	7	24
2	3:02	9	39	2:34	WAKE	Matt Colburn 3-yard touchdown run, Mike Weaver kick good	7	31
2	0:04	11	57	2:58	TEM	45-yard field goal by Aaron Boumerhi	10	31
3	14:08	3	75	0:52	TEM	Adonis Jennings 58-yard touchdown reception from P. J. Walker, Aaron Boumerhi kick good	17	31
3	3:51	11	74	5:13	TEM	24-yard field goal by Aaron Boumerhi	20	31
4	9:36	8	44	3:14	TEM	32-yard field goal by Aaron Boumerhi	23	31
4	3:56	10	56	3:39	TEM	38-yard field goal by Aaron Boumerhi	26	31
4	1:59	4	3	1:57	WAKE	30-yard field goal by Mike Weaver	26	34
"TOP" = time of possession. For other American football terms, see Glossary of American football.							26	34

=== Statistics ===
Statistics	TEM	WAKE
First downs	21	22
Plays-yards	72–376	72–368
Third down efficiency	1–12	6–14
Rushes-yards	23– -20 (-0.9)	43-125 (2.9)
Passing yards	396	243
Passing, Comp-Att-Int	28–49–1	14–29–2
Time of Possession	30:57	29:03

Team	Category	Player	Statistics
TEM	Passing		
TEM	Rushing		
TEM	Receiving		
WAKE	Passing		
WAKE	Rushing		
WAKE	Receiving		
