= Johnny Jernigan =

American football player and coach

Playing career
- 1990–1991: Tyler
- 1992–1993: Stephen F. Austin

Coaching career (HC unless noted)
- 1994–1998: Kilgore (assistant)
- 1999: Henderson State (assistant)
- 2000–2002: Tennessee–Martin (assistant)
- 2002: Tennessee–Martin (interim HC)
- 2003–2005: Tennessee–Martin (assistant)
- 2006–2009: Murray State (DL)
- 2010–2013: Sam Houston State (assistant)
- 2014–2015: Georgia Southern (DE)
- 2016–2019: Tulane (def. analyst)

Johnny Jernigan is an American football coach and former player. He served as a defensive analyst at Tulane University in New Orleans, Louisiana. In 2002, he served as the interim head coach at the University of Tennessee at Martin.
