= Ryan Becker =

American football player (born 1997)

No. 80
- Position: Tight end

Personal information
- Born: December 23, 1997 (age 28); Marble Falls, Texas, U.S.
- Listed height: 6 ft 5 in (1.96 m)
- Listed weight: 248 lb (112 kg)

Career information
- High school: Marble Falls
- College: SMU (2016-2019)
- NFL draft: 2020: undrafted

Career history
- Arizona Cardinals (2020)*; Atlanta Falcons (2021); Orlando Guardians (2023); San Antonio Brahmas (2024)*
- * Offseason or practice squad member only
- Stats at Pro Football Reference

Ryan Becker (born December 23, 1997) is an American former football tight end. He played college football at SMU.

== College career ==
He played for the SMU Mustangs Football team from 2016 to 2019 and finished with 16 Receptions, 198 Receiving Yards, and 5 Touchdowns.

== Professional career ==
=== Arizona Cardinals ===
Arizona signed him as an undrafted free agent following the 2020 NFL draft. He was waived on August 30, 2020.

=== Atlanta Falcons ===
Becker signed a deal with the Atlanta Falcons on April 13, 2021. On August 20, 2021, he was placed on the injured reserve list due to an undisclosed reason, but was then cut from the list on November 8, 2021

On February 15, 2022, he re-signed with Atlanta. On May 13, 2022, Becker was released from the Falcons.

=== Orlando Guardians ===
On November 17, 2022, Becker was drafted by the Orlando Guardians of the XFL. He was released on July 12, 2023.

=== San Antonio Brahmas ===
On October 20, 2023, Becker signed with the San Antonio Brahmas of the XFL. He was not part of the roster after the 2024 UFL dispersal draft on January 15, 2024.
