= Jahad Thomas =

American football player (born 1995)

No. 31, 34
- Position: Running back

Personal information
- Born: November 6, 1995 (age 31); Elizabeth, New Jersey, U.S.
- Listed height: 5 ft 10 in (1.78 m)
- Listed weight: 190 lb (86 kg)

Career information
- High school: Elizabeth (NJ)
- College: Temple
- NFL draft: 2017: undrafted

Career history
- Dallas Cowboys (2017)*; New York Jets (2017); Winnipeg Blue Bombers (2018)*; Memphis Express (2019)*; San Diego Fleet (2019)*
- * Offseason or practice squad member only

Awards and highlights
- First-team All-AAC (2015); Second-team All-AAC (2016)
- Stats at Pro Football Reference

Jahad Thomas (born November 6, 1995) is an American former professional running back. He played college football at Temple University, where he earned second-team All-American Athletic Conference honors in 2016. He was signed by the Dallas Cowboys as an undrafted free agent after the 2017 NFL draft.

== Early life ==
Thomas was born to Connie Thomas and Eddie Roberts in Elizabeth, New Jersey. Thomas was a two-sport athlete at Elizabeth High School where he played both football and basketball. Thomas captained both teams. In football, Thomas played both running back and cornerback. He played alongside his college quarterback, Phillip Walker who currently plays for the Cleveland Browns.

Coming out of high school, Thomas was ranked as three-star prospect by ESPN and the fourth best running back in the state of New Jersey. Thomas also played in the North-South All-Star Football Game.

== College career ==
Thomas decided to sign with the Temple Owls in 2013. In his freshman team with the Owls, Thomas served as the team's kick returner. He missed a game against the Army Black Knights with a knee injury. His special teams play was good enough to warrant a spot on Phil Steele's All-Conference Third-team.

During the summer before his Sophomore year at Temple, Thomas transitioned into becoming a full-time running back. He did not start in the team's first game against Vanderbilt, but led the team with 44 yards on 12 carries. Temple went on to win that game. Later in the year, Thomas made his first start against Navy. His best start of the season came against Tulsa when he ran for 152 yards and caught a 20-yard touchdown, the first of his Temple career.

Thomas' best year came as a Junior. He led Temple's offense with 1,262 rushing yards, 1,677 all-purpose yards, and scored 114 points. That year, Temple went 10–4 and 7–1 in the American Athletic Conference. On October 31, 2015, College Gameday was held in Philadelphia for Temple vs. Notre Dame. Temple went on to appear in the 2015 American Athletic Conference Football Championship Game and the 2015 Boca Raton Bowl.

In his final year with Temple, Thomas ran for 953 yards. He gained enough yards to move up to fourth on Temple's all-time list in total yards. That year, Temple went on to win the 2016 American Athletic Conference Football Championship Game, but lost in the 2016 Military Bowl against Wake Forest.

== Professional career ==
Entering the draft, Thomas was labeled as a "Productive running back lacking in NFL-caliber size and strength but who makes up for it with his quickness and ability to help as a pass catcher and return man" by Lance Zierlein of NFL.com.

Pre-draft measurables
Height	Weight	Hand span	40-yard dash	10-yard split	20-yard split	Vertical jump	Broad jump	Bench press
5 ft 10 3/4 in (1.80 m)	190 lb (86 kg)	9 1/4 in (0.23 m)	4.47 s	1.58 s	2.62 s	32 1/2 in (0.83 m)	116 ft 0 in (35.36 m)	11 reps
All values from NFL Combine.

=== Dallas Cowboys ===
Thomas signed with the Dallas Cowboys as an undrafted free agent on May 12, 2017. He was waived on July 28, 2017.

=== New York Jets ===
On August 23, 2017, Thomas was signed by the New York Jets. He was waived on September 2, 2017. He was re-signed to the practice squad on October 10, 2017. He was released on October 18, 2017. He was re-signed on December 12, 2017. He was promoted to the active roster on December 30, 2017. He was waived on April 14, 2018.

=== Winnipeg Blue Bombers ===
On May 26, 2018, Thomas and the Winnipeg Blue Bombers announced that they had agreed to terms. He was cut by the team before the season started on June 10.

=== Memphis Express ===
In late 2018, Thomas was allocated to the Memphis Express of the Alliance of American Football.

=== San Diego Fleet ===
On January 21, 2019, Thomas was traded to the San Diego Fleet for tight end Darryl Richardson in the first trade in league history. He did not make the final roster.
