= 2016 Cincinnati Bearcats football team =

American college football season

2016 Cincinnati Bearcats football
- Conference: American Athletic Conference
- East Division
- Record: 4–8 (1–7 The American)
- Head coach: Tommy Tuberville (4th season)
- Offensive coordinator: Zac Taylor (1st season)
- Offensive scheme: Pro-style
- Defensive coordinator: Robert Prunty (4th season)
- Base defense: 4–3
- Home stadium: Nippert Stadium

2016 American Athletic Conference football standings
	Conf.			Overall
Team	W		L	W		L
East Division
Temple xy$	7	–	1	10	–	4
No. 19 South Florida x	7	–	1	11	–	2
UCF	4	–	4	6	–	7
Cincinnati	1	–	7	4	–	8
UConn	1	–	7	3	–	9
East Carolina	1	–	7	3	–	9
West Division
Navy xy	7	–	1	9	–	5
Tulsa	6	–	2	10	–	3
Memphis	5	–	3	8	–	5
Houston	5	–	3	9	–	4
SMU	3	–	5	5	–	7
Tulane	1	–	7	4	–	8
Championship: Temple 34, Navy 10
$ – Conference champion; x – Division champion/co-champions; y – Championship game participant; Rankings from AP Poll

The 2016 Cincinnati Bearcats football team represented the University of Cincinnati in the 2016 NCAA Division I FBS football season. The Bearcats were led by fourth-year head coach Tommy Tuberville, played their home games at Nippert Stadium, and were members of the East Division of the American Athletic Conference. They finished the season 4–8, 1–7 in American Athletic play to finish in a three-way tie for fourth place in the East Division. For the first time since 2010, the Bearcats were not eligible for a bowl game.

== Schedule ==
Date	Time	Opponent	Site	TV	Result	Attendance
September 1	7:00 p.m.	UT Martin*	Nippert Stadium; Cincinnati, OH	ESPN3	W 28–7	28,520
September 10	Noon	at Purdue*	Ross–Ade Stadium; West Lafayette, IN	BTN	W 38–20	33,068
September 15	7:30 p.m.	No. 6 Houston	Nippert Stadium; Cincinnati, OH	ESPN	L 16–40	40,015
September 24	3:30 p.m.	Miami (OH)*	Nippert Stadium; Cincinnati, OH (Victory Bell)	ESPNews	W 27–20	38,112
October 1	7:00 p.m.	South Florida	Nippert Stadium; Cincinnati, OH	ESPNU	L 20–45	35,108
October 8	11:30 a.m.	at UConn	Rentschler Field; East Hartford, CT	CBSSN	L 9–20	24,169
October 22	7:00 p.m.	East Carolina^{†}	Nippert Stadium; Cincinnati, OH	CBSSN	W 31–19	32,022
October 29	3:30 p.m.	at Temple	Lincoln Financial Field; Philadelphia, PA	CBSSN	L 13–34	29,763
November 5	3:30 p.m.	BYU*	Nippert Stadium; Cincinnati, OH	CBSSN	L 3–20	37,522
November 12	12:00 p.m.	at UCF	Bright House Networks Stadium; Orlando, FL (rivalry)	ESPNU	L 3–24	30,346
November 18	8:00 p.m.	Memphis	Nippert Stadium; Cincinnati, OH (rivalry)	CBSSN	L 7–34	25,796
November 25	8:30 p.m.	at Tulsa	Chapman Stadium; Tulsa, OK	ESPN2	L 37–40 ^{OT}	18,550
*Non-conference game; ^{†}Homecoming; Rankings from AP Poll released prior to game; All times are in Eastern time

Schedule source:

== Game summaries ==
=== UT–Martin ===
	1	2	3	4	Total
Skyhawks	7	0	0	0	7
Bearcats	0	6	8	14	28

=== At Purdue ===
	1	2	3	4	Total
Bearcats	7	14	3	14	38
Boilermakers	0	7	0	13	20

=== Houston ===
	1	2	3	4	Total
#6 Cougars	7	3	2	28	40
Bearcats	7	3	0	6	16

=== Miami (OH) ===
	1	2	3	4	Total
RedHawks	7	3	10	0	20
Bearcats	3	7	7	10	27

=== South Florida ===
	1	2	3	4	Total
Bulls	10	14	14	7	45
Bearcats	6	14	0	0	20

=== At UConn ===
	1	2	3	4	Total
Bearcats	0	9	0	0	9
Huskies	0	7	10	3	20

=== East Carolina ===
	1	2	3	4	Total
Pirates	3	0	10	6	19
Bearcats	7	7	10	7	31

=== At Temple ===
	1	2	3	4	Total
Bearcats	0	13	0	0	13
Owls	10	7	3	14	34

=== BYU ===
	1	2	3	4	Total
Cougars	3	7	7	3	20
Bearcats	3	0	0	0	3

=== At UCF ===
	1	2	3	4	Total
Bearcats	0	3	0	0	3
Knights	10	0	7	7	24

=== Memphis ===
	1	2	3	4	Total
Tigers	13	14	7	0	34
Bearcats	0	0	0	7	7

=== At Tulsa ===
	1	2	3	4	OT	Total
Bearcats	17	7	7	3	3	37
Golden Hurricane	7	7	7	13	6	40

== Personnel ==
=== Roster ===
2016 Cincinnati Bearcats football team roster
Players
Coaches
Offense

Pos.	#	Name	Class
WR	1	Kahlil Lewis	So
RB	5	Mike Boone	Jr
WR	6	Tshumbi Johnson	Jr
RB	7	Tion Green	Sr
QB	8	Hayden Moore	So
QB	10	Jake Sopko	Fr
QB	11	Gunner Kiel	Sr
QB	12	Ross Trail	Fr
WR	13	Avery Johnson	Jr
QB	14	Sam Fette	Fr
WR	15	Brayden Beard	Fr
WR	17	Jamil Kamara	So
TE	18	Tyler Cogswell	Jr
WR	19	Tyrin Summers	Fr
WR	21	Devin Gray	Jr
RB	22	Deionte Buckley	Jr
RB	25	Chad Banschbach	Jr
WR	26	Jerron Rollins	Fr
RB	26	Hunter Gillespie	Fr
RB	32	Gerrid Doaks	Fr
RB	34	Joshuwa Holloman	Fr
RB	35	Taylor Boose	Fr
TE	39	Doug Bates	Fr
OL	51	Delonte Murray	Sr
OL	52	Reed Armagost	Fr
OL	53	Tyler McGarr	Fr
OL	54	Keith Minor	So
OL	55	Alex Heil	Fr
OL	57	Morgan James	Fr
OL	59	Deyshawn Bond	Sr
OL	60	Zach Bycznski	Fr
OL	64	Will Steur	Jr
OL	65	Idarius Ray	Sr
OL	66	David Niehaus	Sr
OL	68	Grant Schmidt (I)	Fr
OL	71	Korey Cunningham	Jr
OL	72	Garrett Campbell	Jr
OL	73	Ryan Leahy	Sr
OL	74	Kendall Calhoun	Jr
OL	76	Evan Mallory	Fr
OL	77	John Kurtz	So
OL	78	Morgan James	So
OL	79	Ryan Stout	So
WR	80	Malick Mbodj	Fr
TE	81	D. J. Dowdy	Sr
WR	82	Braxton Neal	Fr
TE	83	Josiah Deguara	Fr
WR	84	Nate Cole	Sr
WR	85	Thomas Geddis	Fr
WR	86	Rashad Medaris (I)	Fr
TE	87	Bruno Labelle	Fr
WR	88	Marcel Paul	Fr
WR	88	Jeremiah Williams	So
TE	89	Jake Elfers	So

Defense

Pos.	#	Name	Class
S	2	Tyrell Gilbert	So
LB	3	Christian Angulo	Fr
S	4	Zach Edwards	Sr
S	5	Mike Tyson	Sr
CB	9	Linden Stephens	Jr
S	10	Alex Thomas	So
CB	13	Grant Coleman	Jr
CB	14	J. J. Pinckey (injured)	Jr
LB	17	Collin Widecan	Fr
S	19	Davin Pierce	Fr
S	20	Carter Jacobs	Jr
LB	23	Eric Wilson	Sr
S	24	Malik Clements	So
DB	29	Bryce Beard	Fr
CB	30	Chris Murray	Jr
CB	31	Marquis Smith	Fr
CB	32	James Wiggins	Fr
LB	33	Jaylyin Minor	Jr
S	35	Anthony Legend	So
S	36	Sheldon Doss	Fr
LB	37	Matthew Draper	Fr
DE	40	Ty Sponseller	Fr
LB	41	Joel Dublanko	Fr
LB	42	Antonio Kinard	Sr
DE	43	Michael Pitts	Fr
DE	44	Marquise Copeland	So
LB	45	Bryce Jenkinson	So
NB	46	Perry Young	Fr
DE	47	Landon Brazile	So
LB	48	Kevin Mouhon	So
OLB	49	Tyquan Statham	Fr
DT	50	Sione Tongamoa	Sr
DE	51	Kimoni Fitz	Fr
LB	53	Franklin Bruscianelli	Sr
DE	55	Caleb Ashworth	Fr
DE	56	Mark Wilson	Jr
DT	75	Chris Ferguson	So
DL	77	Beau Harmon	Jr
DT	90	Hakeem Allonce	Sr
DT	91	Marcus Brown	Fr
DE	92	Curtis Brooks	Fr
DE	93	Elijah Ponder	Fr
DT	94	Chris Burton	Jr
DE	95	Bryan Wright	Fr
DT	96	Cortez Broughton	So
DT	97	Norman Oglesby	Fr
DT	98	Lyndon Johnson	Sr
DE	99	Alex Pace	Sr

Special teams

Pos.	#	Name	Class
K	16	Andrew Gantz	Jr
P	26	Sam Geraci	Jr
LS	31	Kyle Curtis	Jr
K	34	Josh Pasley	Sr
LS	41	Jon Vincent	Jr
LS	57	Cody Armstrong	Fr
K	58	Garrett Rigby	Fr

Head coach

- Tommy Tuberville (4th season)

Coordinators/assistant coaches

- Robert Prunty – Associate head coach, co-defensive coordinator, defensive line
- Jeff Koonz – Co-defensive coordinator, linebackers
- Zac Taylor – Assistant head coach, special teams coordinator, tight ends
- Mike Gillhamer – Secondary
- J.B. Grimes – Offensive line
- Nick Grimes – Tight ends, H-backs
- Kenny Ingram – Defensive tackles
- Ty Linder – Special teams coordinator, running backs
- Blake Rolan – Wide receivers

Legend

- (C) Team captain
- (S) Suspended
- (I) Ineligible
- Injured
- Redshirt

Roster

=== Depth chart ===
As of September 27, 2016

Defense

FS
Zach Edwards
Carter Jacobs
⋅

WLB	MLB	SLB
Antonio Kinard	Eric Wilson	Mike Tyson
Perry Young	Jaylyin Minor	Chris Murphy
⋅	⋅	⋅

SS
Tyrell Gilbert
Malik Clements
⋅

CB
Grant Coleman
Davin Pierce
⋅

DE	DT	DT	DE
Kimoni Fitz	Cortez Broughton	Alex Pace	Mark Wilson
Kevin Mouhon	Chris Burton; OR Sione Tongamoa	Marquise Copeland	Landon Brazile
⋅	⋅	⋅	⋅

CB
Linden Stephens
Alex Thomas
⋅

Offense

WR
Kahlil Lewis
Jerron Rollins OR
Thomas Geddis
⋅

WR
Nate Cole
Brayden Beard
⋅

LT	LG	C	RG	RT
Ryan Stout	Idarius Ray	Deyshawn Bond	Ryan Leahy	Korey Cunningham
Reed ArmagostOR Kendal Calhoun	Keith Minor; OR Evan Mallory	David Niehaus	Will Steur	Morgan James
⋅	⋅	Garrett Campbell	⋅	⋅

TE
D.J. Dowdy
Tyler Cogswell
⋅

WR
Devin Gray
Avery Johnson
⋅

QB
Hayden Moore
Ross Trail
Gunner Kiel

Special teams
PK Andrew Gantz
PK Josh Pasley
P Sam Geraci
P Andrew Gantz
KR Mike Boone
OR Tion Green
OR Kahlil Lewis
OR Brayden Beard
PR Brayden Beard
OR Devin Gray
LS Jon Vincent
H Sam Geraci

RB
Mike Boone OR
Tion Green
Chad Banschbach
Deionte Buckley

== Awards and milestones ==
All-AAC
Player	Position	Team
Eric Wilson	LB	1
Cortez Broughton	DT	2

== Players in the 2017 NFL draft ==
Player	Position	Round	Pick	NFL Club
Mike Tyson	S	6	187	Seattle Seahawks
