= 2016 UCF Knights football team =

American college football season

2016 UCF Knights football

Cure Bowl, L 13–31 vs. Arkansas State
- Conference: American Athletic Conference
- East Division
- Record: 6–7 (4–4 The American)
- Head coach: Scott Frost (1st season)
- Offensive coordinator: Troy Walters (1st season)
- Offensive scheme: No-huddle spread option
- Defensive coordinator: Erik Chinander (1st season)
- Base defense: 3–4
- Home stadium: Bright House Networks Stadium

2016 American Athletic Conference football standings
	Conf.			Overall
Team	W		L	W		L
East Division
Temple xy$	7	–	1	10	–	4
No. 19 South Florida x	7	–	1	11	–	2
UCF	4	–	4	6	–	7
Cincinnati	1	–	7	4	–	8
UConn	1	–	7	3	–	9
East Carolina	1	–	7	3	–	9
West Division
Navy xy	7	–	1	9	–	5
Tulsa	6	–	2	10	–	3
Memphis	5	–	3	8	–	5
Houston	5	–	3	9	–	4
SMU	3	–	5	5	–	7
Tulane	1	–	7	4	–	8
Championship: Temple 34, Navy 10
$ – Conference champion; x – Division champion/co-champions; y – Championship game participant; Rankings from AP Poll

The 2016 UCF Knights football team represented the University of Central Florida in the 2016 NCAA Division I FBS football season. The Knights were members of the East Division of the American Athletic Conference (The American) and played their home games at Bright House Networks Stadium on UCF's main campus in Orlando, Florida. They were led by first-year head coach Scott Frost. They finished the regular season 6–6, 4–4 in American Athletic Conference play, finishing in third place in the East Division. They were invited to the Cure Bowl, where they lost to Arkansas State.

This was the second season where UCF would be bowl eligible just one year after going winless. The 2016 season served as a transition between the winless 2015 season and the undefeated season one year later in 2017.

== Personnel ==
2016 UCF Knights football team roster
Players
Coaches
Offense

Pos.	#	Name	Class
RB	1	Jawon Hamilton	Fr
QB	2	Nick Patti	RSr
WR	3	Jaquarius Bargnare	Fr
WR	4	Tre'Quan Smith	RSo
WR	5	Dredrick Snelson	Fr
WR	6	Tristan Payton	So
RB	7	Dontravious Wilson	Sr
QB	8	Tyler Harris	RSo
RB	9	Adrian Killins	Fr
QB	10	McKenzie Milton	Fr
WR	11	Cam Stewart	So
RB	12	Taj McGowan	So
QB	13	Justin Holman	Sr
QB	14	Pete DiNovo	RJr
TE	15	Jordan Franks	Jr
QB	17	Garrett Kruczek	So
WR	18	Dontay Mayfield	Fr
QB	19	Sean Pratt	RSo
WR	20	Taylor Oldham	RSr
WR	28	Trace Ryan	RSo
RB	29	C.J. Jones	RSo
WR	30	Kyle Coltrain	RJr
RB	35	Cedric Jordan-Williams	RJr
RB	37	Michael Willett	RJr
WR	39	Josh Maisel	RJr
TE	40	Kyle MacMeekin	RJr
RB	41	Kenneth Williams	RFr
TE	45	Chris Larsen	RSo
WR	46	Alex Harris	Fr
OL	53	Tyler Hudanick	So
OL	58	Chester Brown	RSr
OL	60	Mark Miller	RSo
OL	62	Micah Anderson	RSr
OL	65	Christian Beard	RSo
OL	66	Aaron Evans	RJr
OL	68	Charles Sprenkel	RJr
OL	69	Mike Cherkaoui	Fr
OL	70	Luke Palmer	RSo
OL	71	Aaron Dowdell	Fr
OL	72	Jordan Johnson	Fr
OL	73	Jason Rae	Sr
OL	74	Boman Swanson	Fr
OL	75	Tate Hernly	RJr
OL	77	Jake Brown	RFr
OL	78	Wyatt Miller	RSo
OL	79	Chavis Dickey	Jr
WR	80	Jonathan Gebka	Fr
TE	81	Anthony Roberson	Fr
WR	82	D'erren Wilson	So
WR	83	Jamari Fye	RJr
WR	84	Jimmie Roberts	RSr
WR	85	Tristan Reaves	RSo
TE	86	Michael Colubiale	RJr
TE	87	Cal Bloom	RSr
TE	88	Jordan Akins	RSo
WR	89	Hayden Jones	RSr

Defense

Pos.	#	Name	Class
LB	2	Chequan Burkett	RJr
DL	5	Jamiyus Pittman	Jr
DB	10	Shaquill Griffin	Sr
DB	13	Bryon Brown	Fr
DB	14	Nevelle Clarke	RFr
LB	16	Mark Rucker	RSr
LB	18	Shaquem Griffin	RJr
DB	20	Brandon Moore	Fr
DB	21	Drico Johnson	RSr
DB	22	T.J. Mutcherson	GS
DB	23	Tre Neal	RSo
DB	24	D.J. Killings	Sr
DB	25	Kyle Gibson	RSo
DB	26	Brandon Scott	RFr
DB	27	Richie Grant	Fr
DB	28	Shawn Burgess-Becker	So
DB	30	Rashard Causey	So
DB	31	Jeremy Boykins	Sr
LB	32	Mario Mathis	RJr
LB	33	Monterious Loggins	Fr
LB	34	Justin McDonald	Sr
LB	35	Dedrion Bacote	Fr
DB	38	Rod Sylvestre	So
DB	39	Stefan Garibaldi	RSo
LB	41	Demeitre Brim	RSr
DL	43	Aaron Cochran	So
LB	44	Nate Evans	Fr
DB	45	Blake Tiralosi	RSr
DB	46	Chris Johnson	RJr
LB	47	Jerod Boykins	Sr
DL	49	Seyvon Lowry	RJr
LB	50	Wyatt Swanson	Fr
LB	51	Errol Clarke	RSr
LB	52	Maurice Russell	RSr
LB	55	Eric Mitchell	Fr
LB	56	Pat Jasinski	So
LB	59	Gary Demarest	RSo
DL	61	Rory Coleman	Jr
LB	63	Randy Shannon Jr.	Fr
LB	67	Clifton Askew	Fr
DL	90	Josh Odigie	Jr
DL	91	Joey Connors	RSo
LB	92	Raedar Frantzen	RFr
DL	93	Tony Guerad	RJr
DL	94	Dakota Nicoll	Fr
DL	95	Trysten Hill	Fr
DL	96	A.J. Wooten	RSo
DL	97	Jock Petree	RJr
DL	98	Brendon Hayes	RFr
LB	99	Titus Davis	RFr

Special teams

Pos.	#	Name	Class
PK	11	Matthew Wright	RSo
PK	19	Donald De La Haye	So
P	36	Caleb Houston	RSr
LS	42	Gage Marsil	RSr
P	48	Mac Loudermilk	RSo
LS	57	Caleb Perez	RSo
LS	64	Luke Ebbesmeyer	RJr
LS	95	Mason Bedell	RFr

Head coach

- Scott Frost

Coordinators/assistant coaches

- Erik Chinander – Defensive Coordinator
- Troy Walters – Offensive Coordinator/Wide Receivers
- Greg Austin – Offensive Line
- Sean Beckton – Tight Ends/Recruiting Coordinator
- Mike Dawson – Defensive Line
- Jovan Dewitt – Linebackers/Special Teams
- Travis Fisher – Defensive Backs
- Ryan Held – Running Backs
- Mario Verduzco – Quarterbacks Coach
- Gerrod Lambrecht – Director of Football Operations
- Megan Taylor – Senior Administrative Assistant
- Marcus Castro-Walker – Director of Player Development
- Sean Dillon – Director of Player Personnel
- Ryan Callaghan – Assistant Director of Player Personnel
- Mike Cassano – Director of High School Relations
- Kenny Bassett – Offensive Graduate Assistant
- Dustin Haines – Offensive Graduate Assistant
- Jack Cooper – Defensive Graduate Assistant
- Zach Crespo – Defensive Graduate Assistant
- Barrett Ruud – Quality Control Administrator
- Kevin Smith – Quality Control Administrator
- Zach Duval – Director of Sports Performance for Football

Legend

- (C) Team captain
- (S) Suspended
- (I) Ineligible
- Injured
- Redshirt

Roster

== Schedule ==
Date	Time	Opponent	Site	TV	Result	Attendance
September 3	7:00 p.m.	South Carolina State (FCS)*	Bright House Networks Stadium; Orlando, FL	ESPN3	W 38–0	36,260
September 10	Noon	at No. 5 Michigan*	Michigan Stadium; Ann Arbor, MI	ABC	L 14–51	109,295
September 17	7:00 p.m.	Maryland*	Bright House Networks Stadium; Orlando, FL	CBSSN	L 24–30 ^{2OT}	43,197
September 24	7:00 p.m.	at FIU*	FIU Stadium; Miami, FL	beIN	W 53–14	18,524
October 1	Noon	at East Carolina	Dowdy–Ficklen Stadium; Greenville, NC	CBSSN	W 47–29	46,042
October 15	7:30 p.m.	Temple^{†}	Bright House Networks Stadium; Orlando, FL	ESPNU	L 25–26	38,299
October 22	Noon	at UConn	Rentschler Field; East Hartford, CT (Civil Conflict)	ESPNews	W 24–16	28,008
October 29	11:00 a.m.	at Houston	TDECU Stadium; Houston, TX	ESPNU	L 24–31	35,846
November 5^{[a]}	5:00 p.m.	Tulane	Bright House Networks Stadium; Orlando, FL	ESPN3	W 37–6	31,571
November 12	Noon	Cincinnati	Bright House Networks Stadium; Orlando, FL (rivalry)	ESPNU	W 24–3	30,346
November 19	8:00 p.m.	Tulsa	Bright House Networks Stadium; Orlando, FL	ESPNews	L 20–35	35,141
November 26	Noon	at South Florida	Raymond James Stadium; Tampa, FL (War on I–4)	CBSSN	L 31–48	36,056
December 17	5:00 p.m.	vs. Arkansas State*	Camping World Stadium; Orlando, FL (Cure Bowl)	CBSSN	L 13–31	27,213
*Non-conference game; ^{†}Homecoming; Rankings from AP Poll released prior to the game; All times are in Eastern time

^{^[a]}The game between UCF and Tulane was originally scheduled for October 7, 2016, but was postponed due to the effects of Hurricane Matthew.

== Game summaries ==
=== South Carolina State ===
South Carolina State Bulldogs at UCF Knights− Game summary

Quarter	1	2	3	4	Total
Bulldogs	0	0	0	0	0
Knights	6	12	13	7	38

at Bright House Networks Stadium • Orlando, FL

- Date: September 3, 2016
- Game time: 7:04 p.m. EST
- Game weather: Temperature: 86° • Wind: SW 8 mph • Weather: Partly Cloudy
- Game attendance: 36,260
- Referee: Anthony Calabrese
- TV announcers (ESPN3): Drew Fellios, Doug Graber

Game information

First Quarter

- UCF – 11:19 Matthew Wright 46 yd field goal (UCF 3–0)
- UCF – 03:42 Matthew Wright 34 yd field goal (UCF 6–0)

Second Quarter

- UCF – 12:48 Matthew Wright 45 yd field goal (UCF 9–0)
- UCF – 10:07 Matthew Wright 37 yd field goal (UCF 12–0)
- UCF – 01:45 Justin Holman 10 yd run; Nick Patti 2-pt conversion failed (UCF 18–0)

Third Quarter

- UCF – 04:55 Dontravious Wilson 1 yd run; Matthew Wright XP good (UCF 25–0)
- UCF – 00:50 Tre'Quan Smith 37 yd pass from Justin Holman; Nick Patti XP no good (UCF 31–0)

Fourth Quarter

- UCF – 12:18 Triston Payton 5 yd pass from Justin Holman; Matthew Wright XP good (UCF 38–0)

Top Passers

- UCF – Justin Holman 14–28, 193 yds, 2 TD
- SCSU – Caleb York 15–35, 134 yds, 1 INT

Top Rushers

- UCF – Jawon Hamilton 14 carries, 55 yds
- SCSU – Caleb York 10 carries, 45 yds

Top Receiving

- UCF – Tre'Quan Smith 4 receptions, 65 yds, 1 TD
- SCSU – Kanome McIntosh 4 receptions, 37 yds

In Scott Frost's first game as head coach of UCF, the Knights broke a 13-game losing streak with their first win since December 4, 2014 at East Carolina. The Knights dominated defensively, recording their first shut out since November 28, 2014 at USF, and their first home shutout since October 29, 2011 vs Memphis. The Knights also forced 3 turnovers, including two fumbles and an interception by Shaquill Griffin. Additionally, the four field goals scored by Matthew Wright are the best of his career. Offensively, the 38 points scored by UCF are the most since November 22, 2014. UCF has also recorded two rushing touchdowns for the first time since 2014, one by Justin Holman and one by Dontravious Wilson. Justin Holman had a slow first half only finishing 6-of-17 passes, but after a strong second half performance of 8-of-11 passes, Holman finished 14–28 for 193 yards and 2 touchdowns, and rushing for 40 yards and a touchdown. Tre'Quan Smith and Tristan Payton have also scored touchdowns.

=== At Michigan ===
UCF Knights at #5 Michigan Wolverines − Game summary

Quarter	1	2	3	4	Total
Knights	0	7	7	0	14
Wolverines	21	13	10	7	51

at Michigan Stadium • Ann Arbor, MI

- Date: September 10, 2016
- Game time: 12:06 p.m. EST
- Game weather: Temperature: 74° • Wind: SW 15–25 mph • Weather: Cloudy with Rain
- Game attendance: 109,295
- Referee: John O'Neill
- TV announcers (ABC): Steve Levy, Brian Griese, Todd McShay

Game information

First Quarter

- MICH – 08:48 Jake Butt 3 yd pass from Wilton Speight; Kenny Allen XP Good (MICH 7–0)
- MICH – 03:29 Khalid Hill 2 yd run; Kenny Allen XP Good (MICH 14–0)
- MICH – 01:55 Amara Darboh 45 yd pass from Wilton Speight; Kenny Allen XP Good (MICH 21–0)

Second Quarter

- MICH – 14:17 Kenny Allen 24 yd field goal (MICH 24–0)
- MICH – 11:30 Jake Butt 14 yd pass from Wilton Speight; Kenny Allen XP Good (MICH 31–0)
- UCF – 11:10 Adrian Killins 87 yd run; Matthew Wright XP Good (MICH 31–7)
- MICH – 06:07 Kenny Allen 36 yd field goal (MICH 34–7)

Third Quarter

- MICH – 11:47 Khalid Hill 1 yd run; Kenny Allen XP good (MICH 41–7)
- MICH – 09:44 Kenny Allen 37 yd field goal (MICH 44–7)
- UCF – 08:03 Dontravious Wilson 34 yd run ; Matthew Wright XP Good (MICH 44–14)

Fourth Quarter

- MICH – 10:24 Amara Darboh 30 yd pass from Wilton Speight; Ryan Tice XP good (MICH 51–14)

Top Passers

- UCF – Nick Patti 3–11, 37 yds
- MICH – Wilton Speight 25–37, 312 yds, 4 TD

Top Rushers

- UCF – Dontravious Wilson 17 carries, 83 yds, 1 TD
- MICH – De'Veon Smith 10 carries, 41 yds

Top Receiving

- UCF – Taylor Oldham 3 receptions, 29 yds
- MICH – Amara Darboh 5 receptions, 111 yds, 2 TD

In a game plagued with special team and quarterback problems, Michigan took an early 31–0 lead into the second quarter. Justin Holman struggled tremendously in the passing game, only completing 3 of his 11 passes for just 19 yards, and fumbled the ball. After Holman went down with an injury just before halftime, Nick Patti came in, also going 3-for-11 for 37 yards. Additionally, Michigan blocked two punts and a field goal attempt in the first quarter.

Despite the trouble, there were some bright spots, mainly in the running game. UCF outrushed the Wolverines 275–119 yards, including an 87-yard rushing touchdown in the second quarter by Adrian Killins, UCF's longest rushing touchdown since November 3, 2007 against Marshall. Additionally, Dontravious Wilson scored a 34-yard rushing touchdown in the third quarter.

=== Maryland ===
Maryland Terrapins at UCF Knights – Game summary

Quarter	1	2	3	4	OT	2OT	Total
Terrapins	0	10	7	0	7	6	30
Knights	7	0	7	3	7	0	24

at Bright House Networks Stadium • Orlando, FL

- Date: September 17, 2016
- Game time: 7:00 p.m. EST
- Game weather: Temperature: 85° • Wind: E-NE 9 mph • Weather: Partly Cloudy
- Game attendance: 43,197
- Referee: Jerry McGinn
- TV announcers (CBSSN): Dave Ryan (play-by-play), Corey Chavous (color), and Melanie Collins (sideline)

Game information

First Quarter

- UCF – 00:24 Dontravious Wilson 4 yd pass from McKenzie Milton; Matthew Wright XP Good (UCF 7–0)

Second Quarter

- MARY – 10:04 Lorenzo Harrison 7 yd run; Adam Greene XP Good (TIE 7–7)
- MARY – 00:00 Adam Greene 33 yd field goal (MARY 10–7)

Third Quarter

- UCF – 03:40 McKenzie Milton 7 yd run; Matthew Wright XP Good (UCF 14–10)
- MARY – 00:41 Kenneth Goins Jr 16 yd run; Adam Greene XP Good (MARY 17–14)

Fourth Quarter

- UCF – 12:04 Matthew Wright 42 yd field goal (TIE 17–17)

Overtime

- MARY – Perry Hills 5 yd run; Adam Greene XP Good (MARY 24–17)
- UCF – Tre'Quan Smith 31 yd pass from McKenzie Milton; Matthew Wright XP Good (TIE 24–24)

Double-Overtime

- MARY – Tyrrell Pigrome 24 yd run (MARY 30–24)

Top Passers

- UCF – McKenzie Milton 21–36, 260 yds, 2 TD, 1 INT
- MARY – Perry Hills 10–23, 127 yds

Top Rushers

- UCF – Jawon Hamilton 12 carries, 65 yds
- MARY – Lorenzo Harrison 15 carries, 77 yds, 1 TD

Top Receiving

- UCF – Tre'Quan Smith 8 receptions, 114 yds, 1 TD
- MARY – Teldrick Morgan 2 receptions, 64 yds

This game was the first start for McKenzie Milton as quarterback for UCF. Milton finished with 21-for-36 for 260 yards and 1 interception leading UCF to their first overtime game since October 9, 2014 vs BYU as well as their first double-overtime game since October 13, 2012 vs Southern Miss. Some of his key plays were a 31-yard touchdown pass to Tre'Quan Smith to force double-overtime, as well as a 7-yard quarterback keeper that gave UCF a 14–10 lead in the third quarter. Unfortunately, Milton's turnovers were costly as he fumbled the ball in double-overtime with what seemed to be an incomplete pass, but the officials ruled it as a fumble and the Knights lost in a heartbreaker. Additionally, this was also the highest attendance in Bright House Networks Stadium since September 20, 2014 vs Bethune-Cookman.

=== At FIU ===
UCF Knights at FIU Panthers – Game summary

Quarter	1	2	3	4	Total
Knights	15	17	14	7	53
Panthers	7	0	0	7	14

at FIU Stadium • Miami, FL

- Date: September 24, 2016
- Game time: 7:00 p.m. EST
- Game weather: Temperature: 80 °F (27 °C) • Wind: 4 • Weather: Showers
- Game attendance: 18,524
- Referee: Adam Savoie
- TV announcers (beIN): Matt Martucci, Brett Romberg, Jordan Daigle
- Sources:UCFKnights.com FIUsports.com

Game information

First Quarter

- UCF 12:05 Dontravious Wilson 1 yd run; 2 pt conversion good (UCF 8–0)
- FIU 05:27 Anthoney Jones 6 yd run; Austin Taylor XP good (UCF 8–7)
- UCF 02:47 Jordan Akins 21 yd pass from McKenzie Milton; Matthew Wright XP good (UCF 15–7)

Second Quarter

- UCF 10:42 Matthew Wright 20 yd field goal (UCF 18–7)
- UCF 08:50 Dontravious Wilson 15 yd run; Matthew Wright XP good (UCF 25–7)
- UCF 03:36 Dontravious Wilson 12 yd run; Matthew Wright XP good (UCF 32–7)

Third Quarter

- UCF 08:04 Adrian Killins 61 yd run; Matthew Wright XP good (UCF 39–7)
- UCF 04:49 C.J. Jones 1 yd run; Matthew Wright XP good (UCF 46–7)

Fourth Quarter

- UCF 13:23 Nick Patti 9 yd run; Matthew Wright XP good (UCF 53–7)
- FIU 10:30 Stantly Thomas 17 yd pass from Alex McGough; Austin Taylor XP good (UCF 53–14)

Top Passers

- UCF – McKenzie Milton 8/14, 173 yds, 1 TD
- FIU – Alex McGough 5/9, 68 yds, 1 TD

Top Rushers

- UCF – Dontravious Wilson 11 attempts, 60 yds, 3 TD
- FIU – Anthony Jones 8 attempts, 36 yds, 1 TD

Top Receiving

- UCF – Jordan Akins 3 receptions, 45 yds, 1 TD
- FIU – Thomas Owens 2 receptions, 42 yds

Top Tacklers

- UCF – Shaquill Griffin 5 tackles
- FIU – Treyvon Williams 13 tackles

In McKenzie Milton's second start as UCF's quarterback, the Knights returned to the win column with their highest scoring game since November 22, 2014 against SMU and the most in an away game since October 27, 2012. UCF would score on their first drive with a run from Dontravious Wilson, and would complete a 2-point conversion to Jordan Franks, going up 8–0. FIU would then score next to make it 8–7. That would be the last time FIU scored until the fourth as the Knights would counter with a 45–0 run by just into the fourth quarter, which included 2 more rushing touchdowns from Wilson, his career high, a 21-yard touchdown pass caught by Jordan Akins, and a 61-yard run by Adrian Killins. The 3 rushing touchdowns by Wilson are also the most by a UCF player since Storm Johnson's Fiesta Bowl game. UCF would also record 501 yards of offense, the most since November 14, 2014 against Tulsa, and 6 rushing touchdowns, the most since September 3, 2011 against Charleston Southern. Additionally, the defense, while only recording one turnover, an interception by Drico Johnson, stepped up against FIU, with Shaquem Griffin recording a career-high 2 sacks in the game.

=== At East Carolina ===
UCF Knights at East Carolina Pirates – Game summary

Quarter	1	2	3	4	Total
Knights	0	16	7	24	47
Pirates	0	7	14	8	29

at Dowdy–Ficklen Stadium • Greenville, NC

- Date: October 1, 2016
- Game time: Noon EST
- Game attendance: 46,042
- TV announcers (CBSSN): Dave Ryan (play-by-play), Corey Chavous (color), and Melanie Collins (sideline)

Game information

Second quarter

- ECU – 11:33 Deondre Farrier 16 yd pass from Philip Nelson; Joshon Perry XP good (ECU 7–0)
- UCF – 11:21 Adrian Killins 100 yd kick return; Matthew Wright XP good (TIE 7–7)
- UCF – 04:18 Devin Anderson Safety by Mark Rucker (UCF 9–7)
- UCF – 03:22 Dontravious Wilson 35 yd run; Matthew Wright XP good (UCF 16–7)

Third quarter

- UCF – 12:30 Jawon Hamilton 2 yd run; Matthew Wright XP good (UCF 23–7)
- ECU – 04:23 Zay Jones 9 yd pass from Philip Nelson; Joshon Perry XP good (UCF 23–14)
- ECU – 00:13 Quay Johnson 75 yd pass from Gardner Minshew; Jake Verity XP good (UCF 23–21)

Fourth quarter

- UCF – 14:20 Dontravious Wilson 14 yd run; Matthew Wright XP good (UCF 30–21)
- UCF – 14:05 Brendon Hayes 4 yd interception return; Matthew Wright XP good (UCF 37–21)
- UCF – 03:48 Matthew Wright 19 yd field goal (UCF 40–21)
- ECU – 01:14 Devin Anderson 1 yd run; 2 pt conversion good (UCF 40–29)
- UCF – 00:54 Taj McGowan 47 yd run; Matthew Wright XP good (UCF 47–29)

Top passers

- UCF – Justin Holman 11–29, 156 yds, 2 INT
- ECU – Philip Nelson 26–43, 296 yds, 2 TDs, 1 INT

Top rushers

- UCF – Dontravious Wilson 11 carries, 74 yds, 2 TD
- ECU – Philip Nelson 10 carries, 15 yds

Top receivers

- UCF – Jordan Franks 2 receptions, 73 yds
- ECU – Jimmy Williams 7 receptions, 145 yds

With McKenzie Milton down with an injury, Justin Holman returned as the starting quarterback for this game. After a scoreless first quarter, ECU scored first to go up 7–0. That was the last lead the Pirates had as UCF immediately countered with a 100-yard kickoff return by Adrian Killins, the fourth player in UCF history to do so. After taking a 16–7 halftime lead, UCF scored again to make it 23–7. The Pirates came back by the end of the third, cutting the lead to 23–21, one of their touchdowns coming off a Justin Holman interception. UCF then responded with a Dontravious Wilson TD as well as a pick six by Brendon Hayes in less than 20 seconds and the Pirates would never come close again. While Holman did struggle, only going 11–29 and throwing 2 interceptions, the running game was strong with 217 yards, including a 35-yard TD run by Dontravious Wilson, his career long, as well as Jawon Hamilton's first career touchdown and a career-long 47-yard run by Taj McGowan. The defense made the biggest difference, with three interceptions, two fumbles, as well as recording a safety and a pick six by Brendon Hayes.

This was UCF's first conference win since December 4, 2014, their last road meeting against East Carolina, as well as Scott Frost's first conference win as head coach. This is also the first time the Knights scored touchdowns on offense, defense, and special teams since November 20, 2010, against Tulane. Now UCF is down 10–5 in the all-time series versus East Carolina, with the Knights winning 4 of their last 6 games, including their last two match-ups in Greenville.

=== Temple ===
Temple Owls at UCF Knights – Game summary

Quarter	1	2	3	4	Total
Owls	7	7	6	6	26
Knights	11	14	0	0	25

at Bright House Networks Stadium • Orlando, FL

- Date: October 15, 2016
- Game time: 7:30 p.m. EST
- TV announcers (ESPNU): Dave LaMont, Rene Ingoglia

UCF would get off to a great offensive start, taking an early 25–7 lead. Tre'Quan Smith would catch a 55-yard Touchdown pass just over a minute in the game, Adrian Killins would catch a 16-yard Touchdown pass, and McKenzie Milton would run 63 yards for a touchdown. From there, UCF would struggle for the rest of the game as Temple's defense would keep the Knights scoreless for the rest of the game. Temple would score a touchdown before halftime cutting UCF's lead to 25–14. UCF would keep their lead until one second left in the 4th quarter when Temple scored a game-winning touchdown to take a 26–25 lead. Temple would stop Adrian Killins in the following kickoff, sealing their win.

=== At UConn ===
UCF Knights at UConn Huskies – Game summary

Quarter	1	2	3	4	Total
Knights	0	14	7	3	24
Huskies	6	10	0	0	16

at Pratt & Whitney Stadium at Rentschler Field • East Hartford, CT

- Date: October 22, 2016
- Game time: Noon EST
- TV announcers (ESPNews): Mike Corey, Rene Ingoglia

UCF would start off slow as they would allow UCONN an early 13–0 lead, with two field goals and a touchdown. Afterwards with 6:50 left in the 2nd quarter, McKenzie Milton would connect for 22 yards with Dredrick Snelson for his first career TD, cutting the lead to 13–7. The defense would hold UCONN to another field goal before McKenzie Milton connected with Jordan Akins for a 19-yard TD with one second left before halftime, cutting UCONN's lead to 16–14. Coming out from halftime, UCF would score on their first drive with a 39-yard TD pass to Adrian Killins, taking the lead for the first time in the game. From there, the defense would shut out UCONN and Matthew Wright would score a 50-yard field goal, his career long. UCONN's last drive would end at the UCF 21 yard line where the defense forces a turnover on downs with 1:38 left. This would be UCF's first win over UCONN since 2013, as well as their first at East Hartford. After the game, UCF did not accept the trophy for the Civil Conflict rivalry, or even acknowledge it, leaving the trophy at Rentschler Field. Additionally, McKenzie Milton threw for a season high 317 yards and three touchdowns and would go 29-for-45.

=== At Houston ===
UCF Knights at Houston Cougars – Game summary

Quarter	1	2	3	4	Total
Knights	7	14	3	0	24
Cougars	0	3	14	14	31

at TDECU Stadium • Houston, TX

- Date: October 29, 2016
- Game time: Noon EST
- Game attendance: 35,846
- TV announcers (ESPNU): Roy Philpott, Tom Ramsey, Dawn Davenport

UCF would get off to another fast start, taking a 21–3 lead over the Cougars by halftime. Adrian Killins would score on a 6-yard run, Dontravious Wilson would score on a 1-yard run, and Jawon Hamilton would run for 28 yards for a TD before halftime. The defense would get 3 interceptions and hold Houston to only a field goal. Coming out of the half, UCF would force another turnover, a fumble, which would lead to UCF scoring a field goal, taking a 24–3 lead. From there, Houston would storm back and score 28 unanswered points to take a 31–24 lead and force four turnovers against UCF: two fumbles, one interception, and a turnover on downs. This is the second time this year that UCF would lose after taking a large lead.

=== Tulane ===
Tulane Green Wave at UCF Knights – Game summary

Quarter	1	2	3	4	Total
Green Wave	6	0	0	0	6
Knights	0	7	13	17	37

at Bright House Networks Stadium • Orlando, FL

- Date: November 5, 2016
- Game time: 5:00 pm EST
- TV announcers (ESPN3): Alex Faust, Forrest Conoly

The game, originally scheduled for a 7:30 pm kickoff on October 6 to be televised on ESPNU, was moved to November 5 due to Hurricane Matthew. The game was moved to November 5 because both teams, coincidentally, had scheduled bye weeks for that week. UCF would start off with a fumble in the first play of the game, and Tulane would score a TD right after, with the Knights blocking the extra point. McKenzie Milton struggled throughout the game only completing 9 out of 20 of his passes and throwing an interception, however he did run for a 1-yd TD taking the lead, 7–6, with 7:39 left in the second quarter. The defense, however, is where the Knights thrived in this game. In the second half, the defense would completely pulverize the Green Wave, shutting them out. Additionally, UCF would score a school record three defensive TDs. First Drico Johnson would score on a 30-yard fumble return for a TD with 7:23 left in the third quarter. Then Shaquill Griffin would score a 33-yard interception return for a TD just a minute after. With 11:23 left in the fourth, Drico Johnson would score another pick six from 86 yards out. At the end of the game, Justin Holman would enter for the first time since East Carolina, and would add the exclamation point for UCF with an 80-yard drive capped off by a 1-yard TD run.

=== Cincinnati ===
Cincinnati Bearcats at UCF Knights – Game summary

Quarter	1	2	3	4	Total
Bearcats	0	3	0	0	3
Knights	10	0	7	7	24

at Bright House Networks Stadium • Orlando, FL

- Date: November 12, 2016
- Game time: Noon EST
- TV announcers (ESPNU): Dave LaMont, Ahmad Brooks

This is the second meeting between the UCF Knights and the Cincinnati Bearcats. Through yet another dominating defensive performance, UCF would win their 6th game, becoming bowl eligible after failing to win a single game last year. This is the second time in UCF history that the Knights would return to a bowl game after going winless the previous year, the other time being in 2005. The defense held Cincinnati to only a field goal and forced 5 turnovers from the Bearcats: a turnover on downs, two interceptions made by Seyvon Lowry and Brandon Scott, a fumble recovery by Shaquem Griffin, and, most notably, a blocked punt that was returned for a touchdown by Justin McDonald. UCF would also score on offense with a 1-yard pass by McKenzie Milton to Dredrick Snelson and a 25-yard run by Jawon Hamilton. McKenzie Milton would finish the game 22-of-34 for 150 yards and a touchdown, while Jawon Hamilton led the team in rushing for 81 yards and a touchdown in 17 carries, and Tre'Quan Smith led the team in receptions catching 4 receptions for 38 yards.

=== Tulsa ===
Tulsa Golden Hurricanes at UCF Knights – Game summary

Quarter	1	2	3	4	Total
Golden Hurricane	7	7	21	0	35
Knights	8	6	0	6	20

at Bright House Networks Stadium • Orlando, FL

- Date: November 19, 2016
- Game time: 8:00 pm EST
- TV announcers (ESPNews): Mike Corey, Rene Ingoglia

UCF would start off the game on a high note with a pick six by DJ Killings with a 2-pt conversion. Tulsa would respond with 2 touchdowns, one of which they were able to convert from a fumble. UCF would fight back in the 2nd quarter to tie the game at the half, 14–14. In the second half, Tulsa would dominate, scoring 3 straight touchdowns, taking a 35–14 lead. UCF would score one more touchdown by Adrian Killins to make it 35–20. McKenzie Milton completed 25 of his 51 passes for 233 yards. UCF's rushing game struggled as Milton led the team with 12 carries for 37 yards. Tre'Quan Smith led the team in receptions with 5 catches for 71 yards.

=== At South Florida ===
UCF Knights at South Florida Bulls – Game summary

Quarter	1	2	3	4	Total
Knights	7	7	10	7	31
Bulls	14	10	7	17	48

at Raymond James Stadium • Tampa, FL

- Date: November 26, 2016
- Game time: Noon EST
- TV announcers (CBSSN): Dave Ryan (play-by-play), Corey Chavous (color), and Melanie Collins (sideline)

UCF would score first with a 3-yard run by Jawon Hamilton, but USF would respond with a 43-yard run by Marlon Mack for a touchdown. UCF would also fumble the ball afterwards with Juwuan Brown returning it for a touchdown. USF would lead 24–7 before UCF would respond with a 72-yard touchdown by Tre'Quan Smith in a trick play pass by Tristan Payton, making it 24–14 at the half. In the third quarter, Quinton Flowers would score a touchdown run from 62 yards, but UCF would fight back with a field goal and a touchdown by Taj McGowan, making it a one-possession game at the end of the third, 31–24. In the 4th quarter, however, any hope for a comeback would disintegrate as USF would score on a 24-yard run by Quinton Flowers as well as a field goal to make it 41–24. Milton who threw 2 interceptions in the game was later pulled out and Justin Holman played late in the 4th. He completed a 41-yard touchdown pass to Tre'Quan Smith. USF would score again with 11 seconds to go to make it 48–31. UCF gained 402 total yards and 22 first downs, but the Knights struggled with 3 turnovers. McKenzie Milton would lead the team in passing yards, completing 26 out of 42 of his passes for 225 yards, but throwing 2 interceptions. Jawon Hamilton would lead the team in rushing for 54 yards with 14 carries and a touchdown. Tre'Quan Smith led the team with in receiving yards with 7 receptions for 183 yards and 2 touchdowns.

=== vs Arkansas State–Cure Bowl ===
Cure Bowl – Game summary

Quarter	1	2	3	4	Total
Knights	0	10	3	0	13
Red Wolves	17	0	7	7	31

at Camping World Stadium • Orlando, FL

- Date: December 17, 2016
- Game time: 5:30 pm EST
- TV announcers (CBSSN/Touchdown Radio): Carter Blackburn, Aaron Taylor, Jenny Dell/Bernie Guenther, Gino Torretta, Jamie Seh

In a game plagued by offensive and special teams struggles, UCF would be dominated by Arkansas State. Arkansas State would first score from a blocked punt return for a touchdown in the end zone. Arkansas State would lead by as much as 17–0 before UCF scored with 9:31 in the 2nd quarter by an 11-yard reception by Taylor Oldham, his first career touchdown. UCF would make it a one-possession game at the half, 17–10. Once again, UCF struggled in the second half and would be outscored 14–3. UCF's defense held Arkansas State to 8 first downs, but the offense was unable to capitalize on drives and special teams struggled tremendously with a blocked punt return for a touchdown. Additionally, special teams gave up 2 more turnovers, with a fumble from Hayden Jones on a kickoff return and a muffed punt by Chris Johnson. Each of these special teams struggles set up the Red Wolves with excellent field position where they scored 2 of their touchdowns. McKenzie Milton led the team with 22 of 39 passes complete for 175 yards and a touchdown. UCF's running game once again struggled with Jawon Hamilton leading with 10 carries for 14 yards. Taylor Oldham led the passing yards with 5 receptions for 56 yards and a touchdown.
