= Civil Conflict =

American college football rivalry, Connecticut–UCF

- UConn Huskies UCF Knights
- Sport: Football
- First meeting: October 26, 2013; UCF 62–17
- Latest meeting: November 20, 2021; UCF 49–17

Statistics
- Total meetings: 8
- All-time series: UCF leads, 6–2

Locations of UConn and UCF

The Civil Conflict (sometimes styled as the conFLiCT) was the name given by former UConn Huskies football head coach Bob Diaco to Connecticut's annual matchup against the UCF Knights football team of the University of Central Florida. The teams first met in 2013 as members of the American Athletic Conference.

== History ==
UCF and UConn first met in 2013 after UCF left Conference USA and joined the American Athletic Conference. The first mention of the rivalry and associated trophy occurred after Connecticut's 37–29 victory over UCF in November 2014, which was Diaco's first FBS win as Connecticut head coach. The 2014 game also broke UCF's 11-game winning streak in conference play.

In a press statement Diaco said "We're excited about this game. I mean it. I'm excited to continue this game. With all admiration and respect. All admiration and respect for Central Florida and Coach O'Leary. They're spectacular. But we're excited about this North/South battle. You want to call it the Civil Conflict?"

UCF head coach George O'Leary responded with "My experience is you’re more likely to have a rivalry against a team closer to where you live,” he said. “When you go 10 states away, I think it’s hard." UCF's traditional rivalry has been with the University of South Florida located 90 miles away in Tampa, Florida, while UCF and UConn are 1,214 miles apart.

In response to this statement, Diaco released a statement of his own a week later that same week saying "They don't get to say whether they are our rival or not. We might not be their rival, but they don't get to say whether they are our rival—that is for us to decide."

== Trophy ==
In June 2015, Diaco had a trophy built for the series and announced it on Twitter. UCF had not been aware of it beforehand. The Knights' head coach and interim athletic director George O'Leary dismissed both the trophy and the motivations for a rivalry between the two teams. Diaco responded by saying, "They don't get to say whether they are our rival or not." The New York Post said that Diaco created the "worst rivalry in sports history."

The teams played three times during Diaco's tenure as head coach and twice following his announcement of the trophy. UConn won in 2014 and 2015. UCF won the 2016 game, and proceeded to exit the field without acknowledging or accepting the trophy. The trophy was then purportedly crated and transported back to Connecticut. Following that game, Diaco said he was "shelving the venture".

In 2016, UCF head coach Scott Frost asked UConn not to bring the trophy and that UCF was officially opting out of the rivalry game. UConn elected to ignore Frost's request and brought the trophy to the 2016 game anyway. UCF went on to beat UConn that year 24–16, however the UCF team did not claim the trophy and it was left unattended on the UCF sideline after the game. Diaco was fired as head coach of UConn at the end of the 2016 season after an 11–26 record over his three seasons as head coach; Randy Edsall, who replaced Diaco, elected to not continue the supposed rivalry. After leaving UConn, Diaco stated that UCF knew about the Conflict and they had been engaged prior to the announcement of the rivalry by UConn. UConn women's basketball head coach Geno Auriemma said the rivalry "might have been the dumbest thing in the history of sports."

UConn Athletic Director David Benedict, who himself never officially acknowledged the rivalry or the trophy, was asked in 2017 about the trophy's whereabouts. He replied, "I honestly don't know. That trophy was there before I got there. I believe that trophy was commissioned and paid for by coach Diaco. And therefore if it left with him, I don't know that, but if it did that's fine."

During the 2017 meeting in Orlando, the trophy and the claimed rivalry continued to be a subject of ridicule, and the whereabouts of the original trophy were still unknown.

On the eve of the 2021 matchup, UCF posted a video showing what was believed to be an "imposter" trophy on the field at the Acrisure Bounce House.

In 2023, The Athletic reported that the fan who gave UCF the trophy claimed it was repaired after it suffered rain damage from being left on the field after the 2016 game, leading to a slightly different design. UCF's associate athletic director Eric DeSalvo believes the trophy is real, but UCF could not confirm it.

== Game results ==
UConn victories	UCF victories

No.	Date	Location	Winner	Score
1	October 26, 2013	Orlando, FL	#21 UCF	62–17
2	November 1, 2014	East Hartford, CT	UConn	37–29
3	October 10, 2015	Orlando, FL	UConn	40–13
4	October 22, 2016	East Hartford, CT	UCF	24–16
5	November 11, 2017	Orlando, FL	#6 UCF	49–24
6	August 30, 2018	East Hartford, CT	#11 UCF	56–17
7	September 28, 2019	Orlando, FL	#24 UCF	56–21
8	November 20, 2021	Orlando, FL	UCF	49–17
Series: UCF leads 6–2
