= Scott Frost =

American football player and coach (born 1975)

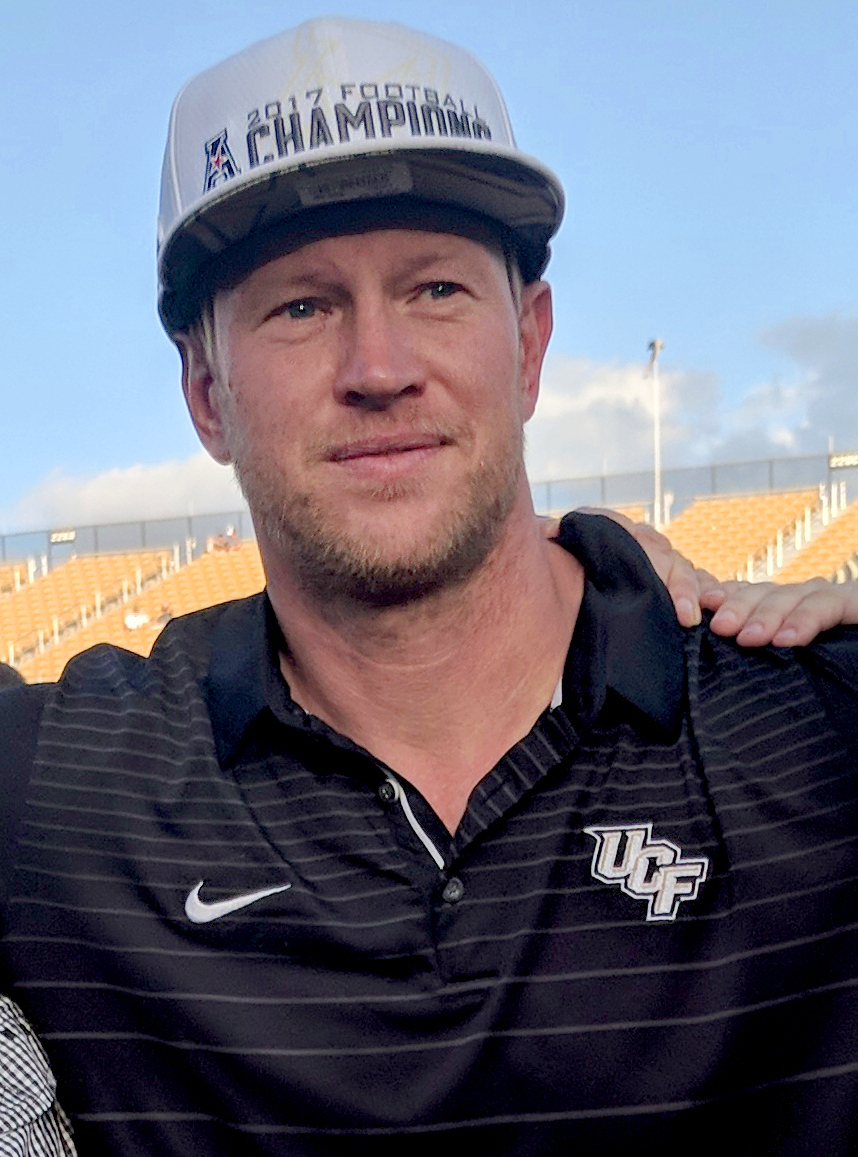
- Frost in 2017

UCF Knights
- Title: Head coach

Personal information
- Born: January 4, 1975 (age 51); Lincoln, Nebraska, U.S.

Career information
- Position: Quarterback
- High school: Wood River (Wood River, Nebraska)
- College: Stanford (1993–1994); Nebraska (1995–1997)
- NFL draft: 1998: 3rd round, 67th overall pick

Career history

Playing
- New York Jets (1998–2000); Cleveland Browns (2001); Green Bay Packers (2002); San Francisco 49ers (2003)*; Tampa Bay Buccaneers (2003)
- * Offseason or practice squad member only

Coaching
- Nebraska Graduate assistant (2002); Kansas State (2006) Graduate assistant; Northern Iowa (2007–2008); Linebackers coach (2007); Co-defensive coordinator (2008); Oregon (2009–2015); Wide receivers coach (2009–2012); Offensive coordinator (2013–2015); UCF (2016–2017) Head coach; Nebraska (2018–2022) Head coach; Los Angeles Rams (2024) Senior analyst; UCF (2025–present) Head coach

Awards and highlights
- Playing: 2× national champion (1995, 1997); Big 12 Offensive Newcomer of the Year (1996); Second-team All-Big 12 (1997); Coaching: National champion (2017); AAC champion (2017); AAC East Division champion (2017); Paul "Bear" Bryant Award (2017); AP College Football Coach of the Year (2017); Eddie Robinson Coach of the Year (2017); AFCA Coach of the Year (2017); Woody Hayes Trophy (2017); Home Depot Coach of the Year (2017); FCA Grant Teaff Coach of the Year (2017); AAC Coach of the Year (2017)

Career NFL statistics
- Interceptions: 1
- Interception yards: 1
- Stats at Pro Football Reference

Head coaching record
- Career: 46–50 (.479)

Scott Andrew Frost (born January 4, 1975) is an American football coach and former player who serves as the head football coach at the University of Central Florida. He was the head football coach at the University of Nebraska–Lincoln from 2018 to 2022, and previously served as UCF's head coach from 2016 to 2017. Born in Lincoln, Nebraska, Frost played college football as a quarterback for the Stanford Cardinal and the Cornhuskers, the latter of which he led to a national championship in 1997. Frost has coached Heisman Trophy winner Marcus Mariota and Heisman candidate McKenzie Milton. He played professionally for six seasons at safety in the National Football League (NFL).

After retiring as a player, Frost served as an assistant coach for several college football teams, most notably as the offensive coordinator for the University of Oregon from 2013 to 2015, where he helped the 2014 Oregon Ducks football team to a berth in the first college football playoff (CFP), where they lost to Ohio State in the national championship game.

Frost was subsequently hired as the head football coach at the UCF, where he coached for two seasons. After an inaugural season of 6–7 in 2016, Frost's 2017 Knights posted a 13–0 record, winning the American Athletic Conference championship and defeating the Auburn Tigers in the Peach Bowl. The Colley Matrix recognized the 2017 UCF team as national champions, and the school claims a national title despite not receiving an invitation to participate in the College Football Playoff. However, the NCAA only recognizes the 2017 UCF team as a “Final National Polls Leader,” reserving “National/Co-National Champion” status for teams that finish atop at least one of the “consensus polls,” those being the AP, Coaches Poll, and NFF/FWAA. This remains Frost's only winning season as a head coach.

In December 2017, Frost accepted the head coaching position at his alma mater, the University of Nebraska–Lincoln. Frost's coaching record at Nebraska was 16–31, with a 10–26 record in the Big Ten Conference, a 5–22 record in games decided by eight points or less, and an 0–14 record against ranked opponents. Nebraska fired Frost three games into the 2022 season after an upset loss at home against Georgia Southern.

In December 2024, Frost was re-hired as UCF's head coach following the resignation of Gus Malzahn.

== Early life, family and high school ==
Scott Frost was born in Lincoln, Nebraska, the son of Larry and Carol (Moseke) Frost. She was a renowned discus athlete who competed in the 1968 Summer Olympics. Larry Frost was a long time high school football coach. Scott's older brother Steve (born July 4, 1973) played defensive line and long snapper at Stanford.

Scott attended Wood River High School in Wood River, Nebraska from 1989 to 1993. Both his parents coached his high school football team. In four years as the team's starting quarterback, he threw for 6,859 yards and 67 touchdowns and rushed for 4,278 yards and 72 touchdowns. He led his team to the state playoffs in his sophomore, junior, and senior seasons. In those three postseason appearances, Frost's teams won five games and twice made it to the state semi-finals.

In addition to football, Frost was a standout in track and field, winning a state championship in the shot put. At the state championship meet his senior year, Frost won an all-class gold medal with a throw of 17.92 m (58 ft 9 1/2 in), with his personal best from earlier that year reaching 18.62 m (61 ft 1 in).

== College career ==
Frost began his collegiate career as a two-year letterman at Stanford in 1993 and 1994, playing for Bill Walsh, before transferring to Nebraska in 1995 to play for Tom Osborne. In his two seasons starting for Nebraska, Frost quarterbacked his teams to a 24–2 record, completing 192 of 359 passes for 2,677 yards and 18 touchdowns, including a senior season in which he became the first Nebraska player and only the tenth player in college football history to both run (1,095) and pass (1,237) for 1,000 yards, also setting school records for rushing touchdowns (19) and yards. He was the 1996 Big 12 Offensive Newcomer of the Year and a 1997 Johnny Unitas Golden Arm Award finalist.

Frost's senior season featured the notable "Flea Kicker" play in a game against Missouri, where he threw a pass that was inadvertently kicked by teammate Shevin Wiggins and caught by Matt Davison for a touchdown. The score sent the game into overtime where Frost sealed No. 1 Nebraska's victory with a rushing touchdown. Frost and Nebraska went on to defeat Peyton Manning's Tennessee Volunteers in the 1998 Orange Bowl and claim a share of the 1997 national championship. Scott Frost was featured as the cover athlete for the NCAA GameBreaker 99 video game. Frost graduated from Nebraska with a B.A. in finance.

=== Statistics ===
Career statistics
Season	Games	Starts	Record	Passing							Rushing			
Season	Games	Starts	Record	Comp	Att	Yards	Pct	TD	Int	Rating	Att	Yards	Avg	TD
Stanford Cardinal
1993	11	0	4–7	2	9	6	22.2	0	0	27.8	15	63	4.2	0
1994	11	2	3–7–1	33	77	464	42.9	2	5	89.1	38	193	5.1	2
Nebraska Cornhuskers
1995	(redshirt) Redshirted													
1996	13	13	11–2	104	200	1,440	52.0	13	3	130.9	126	438	3.5	9
1997	13	13	13–0	88	159	1,237	55.3	5	4	126.0	176	1,095	6.22	19
Career totals	48	28	31–16–1	227	445	3,147	51.0	20	12	119.9	355	1,789	5.0	30

== Professional football career ==
Pre-draft measurables
Height	Weight	40-yard dash	10-yard split	20-yard split	Vertical jump
6 ft 2 3/4 in (1.90 m)	219 lb (99 kg)	4.62 s	1.58 s	2.67 s	34.5 in (0.88 m)
All values from NFL Combine

Following his collegiate career, Frost was selected in the third round (67th overall) of the 1998 NFL draft by the New York Jets as a safety. As a rookie in 1998, Frost played in 13 games mostly on special teams, making six tackles and two passes defended. In 1999, Frost played in 14 games with seven tackles. Playing in all 16 games in 2000, Frost made his first career start against the Buffalo Bills on October 29. Frost also got his only career interception against Bills quarterback Rob Johnson on September 17 and sole career sack against the Oakland Raiders' Rich Gannon on December 11.

The day after being waived by the Jets, Frost signed with the Cleveland Browns on August 28, 2001. Frost played in 12 games mostly on special teams, making 14 total tackles and a fumble recovery. The Browns waived Frost on December 10.

On December 19, 2001, Frost signed with the Green Bay Packers. However, due to injuries, he never appeared in any games for the Packers, and he was waived on December 17, 2002. In his final NFL season, Frost played in four games for the Tampa Bay Buccaneers in 2003.

== Coaching career ==
In December 2002, while still on the Green Bay Packers' injured reserve list, Frost served as a temporary graduate assistant at his alma mater. He was later a graduate assistant at Kansas State in 2006. In 2007, he took a position at Northern Iowa as the linebackers coach, and in 2008 he was elevated to co-defensive coordinator. His defense finished the 2008 season tied for third in the FCS in takeaways (40) and ninth in scoring defense (17.7 points per game). The 12–3 Panthers also led the Missouri Valley Football Conference in rushing defense (107.1 yards per game) and scoring defense.

=== Oregon ===
On January 26, 2009, Frost joined the coaching staff at Oregon as the wide receivers coach, working under head coach Chip Kelly and offensive coordinator Mark Helfrich. During Frost's four seasons as the wide receivers coach, Oregon reached four straight BCS bowls and three of Frost's wide receivers were invited to NFL camps.

Following Chip Kelly's departure to the NFL to coach the Philadelphia Eagles, Oregon promoted Mark Helfrich to head coach and Frost was announced as the offensive coordinator and quarterbacks coach on January 31, 2013. In 2014, Frost was a finalist for the Broyles Award, given annually to the nation's top assistant coach. As the quarterbacks coach, he mentored Marcus Mariota, who won the Heisman Trophy, en route to a berth in the National Championship game. During Frost's three seasons as Oregon's offensive coordinator, the team recorded a 33–8 record and finished every year ranked among the nation's top six in both scoring offense and total offense.

=== UCF (first stint) ===
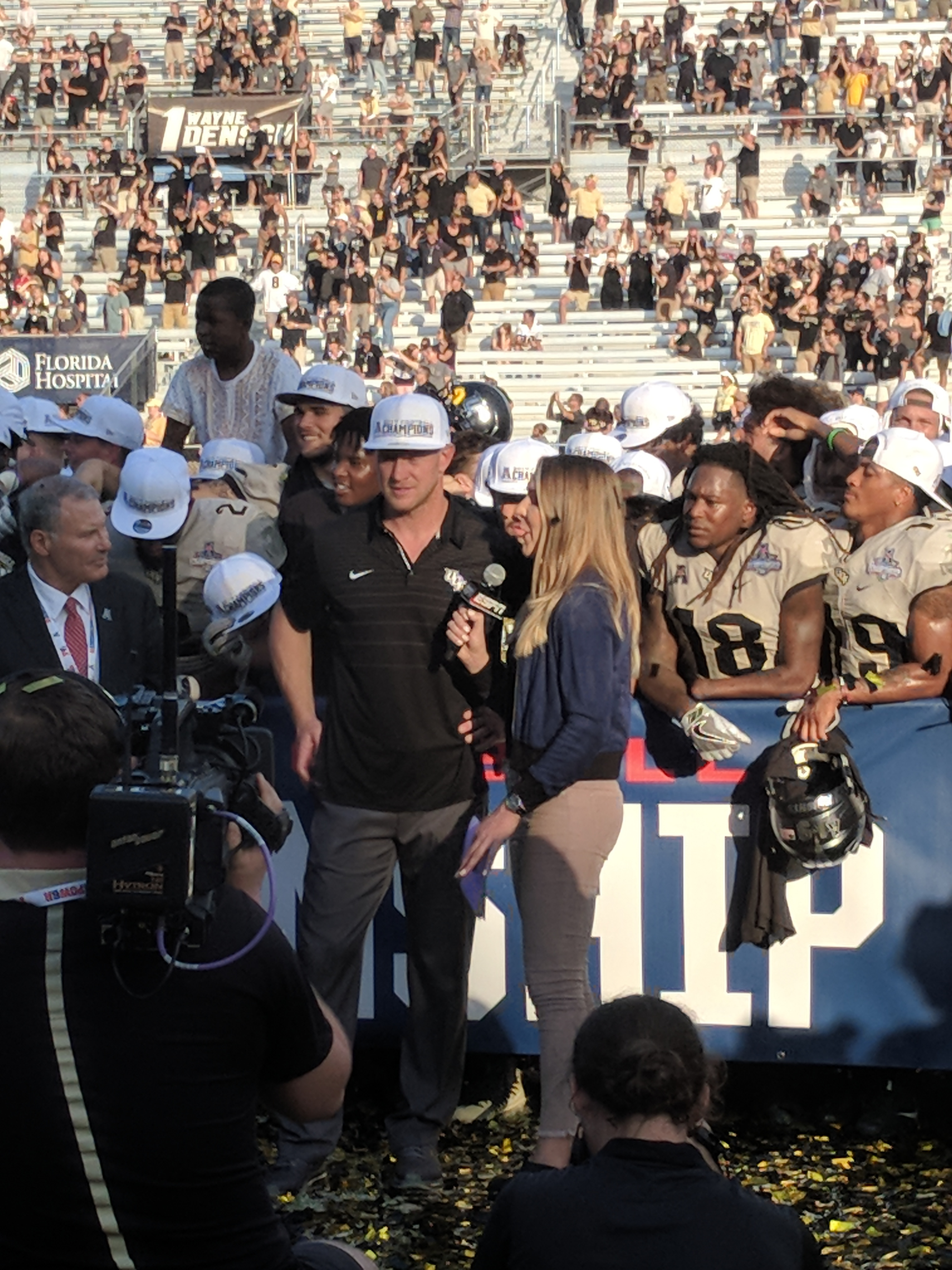
Frost in 2017, after coaching UCF to victory over Memphis in the 2017 American Athletic Conference Football Championship Game

On December 1, 2015, Frost was hired as the head football coach at the University of Central Florida. Frost replaced long time UCF head coach George O'Leary and interim head coach Danny Barrett, who took over the Knights when O'Leary resigned following an 0–8 start. The Knights went on to finish 0–12 that year. Frost immediately turned UCF around. He won six games in 2016, taking the Knights to the 2016 Cure Bowl, where they lost to Arkansas State. In 2017, the Knights stormed through the regular season, finishing 11–0. They won the AAC championship game 62–55 in double overtime at home against Memphis for their 12th consecutive win. Frost led the Knights into the 2018 Peach Bowl, the school's second-ever appearance in a major bowl. In that game, they defeated 7th ranked Auburn, completing the first undefeated and untied season in school history. Following the game, the school claimed a national championship which is recognized in the official NCAA record books. (Note: UCF claims a national championship for the 2017 season, and the team was ranked number 1 by the Colley Matrix, an NCAA-recognized selector of national champions.) He coached several NFL players, which include: Jordan Akins, Otis Anderson Jr., Nevelle Clarke, Gabe Davis, Kalia Davis, Jordan Franks, Richie Grant, Shaquill Griffin, Shaquem Griffin, Jacob Harris, Trysten Hill, Mike Hughes, D. J. Killings, Adrian Killins, Wyatt Miller, Jamiyus Pittman, Aaron Robinson, Cole Schneider, Tre'Quan Smith, Alex Ward, Marlon Williams, and Matthew Wright.

=== Nebraska ===
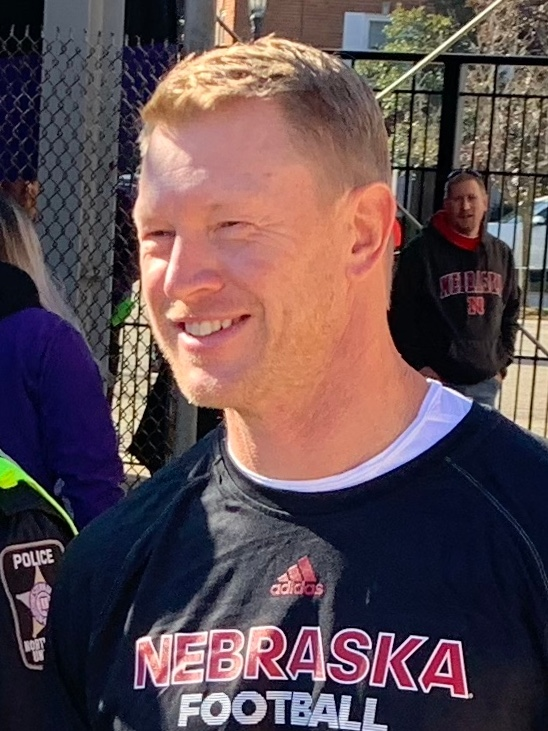
Scott Frost at Nebraska in 2018

On December 2, 2017, Frost accepted the head football coach position at his alma mater, the University of Nebraska–Lincoln. Despite immediate fanfare following Frost's arrival in Lincoln, including a commemorative state holiday in which Governor Pete Ricketts declared September 1 as "Scott Frost Day," Frost's 2018 Nebraska Cornhuskers began the season with six straight losses, the worst start to a football season in school history. Nebraska had three losses in that stretch by five points or less. Scott Frost finished his first season 4–8, the worst single-season record of any Nebraska head football coach in more than fifty years.

The 2019 season started off better for Frost with a 4–2 start. However, the Cornhuskers dropped their next four games to fall to 4–6. Nebraska defeated Maryland 54–7 on November 23 to set up a game in the regular season finale against Iowa with bowl game implications. Nebraska fell to the Hawkeyes 27–24 to fall to 5–7 and give Frost his second losing season at Nebraska.

Nebraska's 2020 season was cut to a conference-only, eight game schedule due to the COVID-19 pandemic. Nebraska went 3–5 with victories over Penn State, Purdue, and Rutgers in the 2020 season.

On November 8, 2021, during Frost's fourth season, Nebraska Athletics Director Trev Alberts, himself a former player, announced a restructuring to Frost's contract, ending speculation on the coach's job status. Alberts indicated that Frost would return for the 2022 season, but with a salary reduced by $1 million and a lower buyout. On the same day of the announcement, Scott Frost dismissed four offensive coaching assistants: offensive line coach Greg Austin, running backs coach Ryan Held, offensive coordinator Matt Lubick, and quarterbacks coach Mario Verduzco. Frost finished the 2021 season with a 3–9 record.

In his first four seasons as Nebraska's head coach, Frost's teams never played in a bowl game and failed to compete in the West Division of the Big Ten, never rising higher than fifth. Frost posted a record of 5–20 in games decided by 8 points or less, a 10–25 record in Big Ten Conference games, and an 0–14 record against ranked opponents. His 2021 Cornhuskers set a college football record with nine single-digit losses in a season.

Nebraska fired Frost on September 11, 2022, the day after Georgia Southern upset the Cornhuskers at home 45–42. Frost was owed a $16.4 million buyout. Due to a clause that came from restructuring his contract, Nebraska would have only owed Frost about $8.7 million if he was fired after October 1, 2022. It was the first time in 215 home games that Nebraska lost while scoring over 35 points. Mickey Joseph succeeded Frost as interim head coach. Frost became the first Nebraska head coach since Bill Jennings (1957–1961) not to have a winning season during his tenure.

=== UCF (second stint) ===
On December 7, 2024, UCF announced that Frost would be returning as the head coach of UCF following the resignation of Gus Malzahn. Frost was signed to a five-year contract with UCF, making him the head coach through the 2029 season. In his first season back at UCF, he finished with a 5–7 record in the 2025 season.

== Head coaching record ==
Year	Team	Overall	Conference	Standing	Bowl/playoffs	Coaches^{#}	AP^{°}
UCF Knights (American Athletic Conference) (2016–2017)
2016	UCF	6–7	4–4	3rd (East)	L Cure		
2017	UCF	13–0	8–0	1st (East)	W Peach^{†}	7	6
Nebraska Cornhuskers (Big Ten Conference) (2018–2022)
2018	Nebraska	4–8	3–6	T–5th (West)			
2019	Nebraska	5–7	3–6	T–5th (West)			
2020	Nebraska	3–5	3–5	5th (West)			
2021	Nebraska	3–9	1–8	T–6th (West)			
2022	Nebraska	1–2 (Note: Frost was fired after three games)	0–1	(West)			
Nebraska:		16–31	10–26				
UCF Knights (Big 12 Conference) (2025–present)
2025	UCF	5–7	2–7	T–13th			
2026	UCF	6–5	4–4				
UCF:		30–19	18–15				
Total:		46–50					
National championship Conference title Conference division title or championship game berth
^{†}Indicates CFP / New Years' Six bowl.; ^{#}Rankings from final Coaches Poll.; ^{°}Rankings from final AP Poll.
