= 2016 Cure Bowl =

American college football game

2016 AutoNation Cure Bowl
- 2nd Cure Bowl
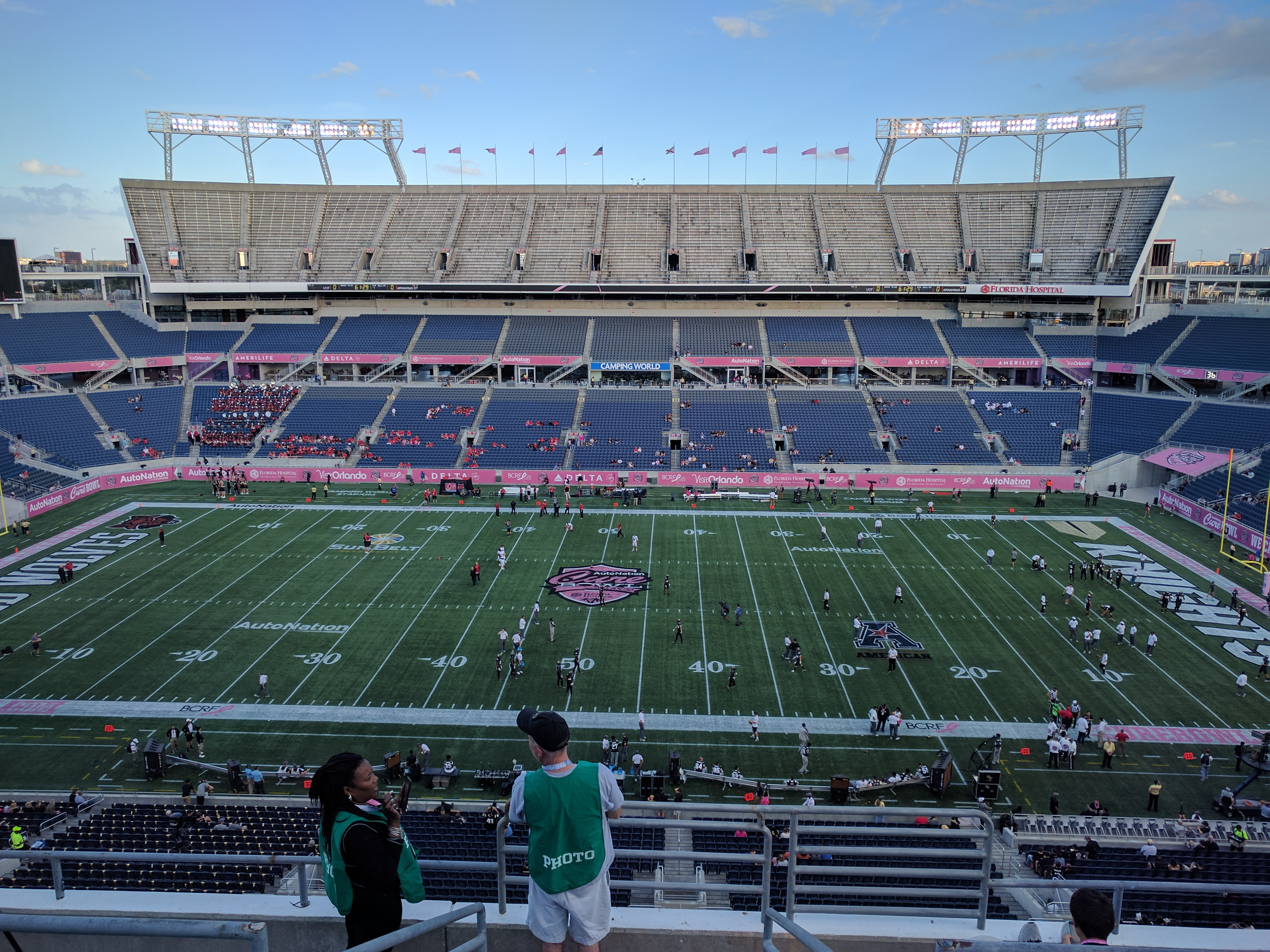
- The field prior to kickoff
Arkansas State Red Wolves	UCF Knights
(7–5)	(6–6)
Sun Belt	The American
31	13
Head coach: Blake Anderson	Head coach: Scott Frost
	1	2	3	4	Total
Arkansas State	17	0	7	7	31
UCF	0	10	3	0	13
- Date: December 17, 2016
- Season: 2016
- Stadium: Camping World Stadium
- Location: Orlando, Florida
- MVP: Arkansas State WR Kendall Sanders
- Favorite: UCF by 7
- National anthem: Girl Scouts of Citrus
- Referee: Kevin Mar (Mtn. West)
- Attendance: 27,213
- Payout: US$1,350,000

United States TV coverage
- Network: CBSSN; Touchdown Radio
- Announcers: Carter Blackburn, Aaron Taylor, & Jenny Dell (CBSSN); Bernie Guenther, Gino Torretta, & Jamie Seh (Touchdown Radio)

The 2016 Cure Bowl was a post-season American college football bowl game played on December 17, 2016, at Camping World Stadium in Orlando, Florida. The second annual edition of the Cure Bowl is one of the 2016–17 bowl games that concludes the 2016 FBS football season. Sponsored by automotive retailer AutoNation, the game is officially known as the AutoNation Cure Bowl. Notably, the UCF Knights would not lose another game until the 2019 Fiesta Bowl.

== Teams ==
The game features teams from the American Athletic Conference and Sun Belt Conference. On December 4, 2016, it was announced that the 2016 matchup would feature the UCF Knights taking on the Arkansas State Red Wolves. The two teams have only played each other once before, with the Knights defeating the Indians (as ASU was then known as) at Centennial Bank Stadium 31–20 in 1991.

=== Arkansas State ===
After finishing the season with a 7–5 record, the Red Wolves will be appearing in their sixth straight bowl game. Arkansas State last played at Camping World Stadium in the 1954 Tangerine Bowl, when the stadium was called the Tangerine Bowl. The Red Wolves' on-campus stadium, Centennial Bank Stadium, is a 886 miles (1,426 km) drive from Camping World Stadium.

=== UCF ===
Following the winless 2015 season, first year coach Scott Frost led the team to a 6–6 record with wins over South Carolina State, FIU, East Carolina, Connecticut, Tulane, and Cincinnati. The Knights have not played at Camping World Stadium since the opening of the on-campus Bright House Networks Stadium following their 2006 season. Prior to that, the team had used the Citrus Bowl (the previous name of Camping World Stadium), which is a 17.7 miles (28.5 km) drive from Bright House Networks Stadium, as their home stadium for the previous 30 years.

== Officials ==
The officials from the game came from the Mountain West Conference.

Referee: Kevin Mar

Umpire: Stuart Schake

Head Linesman: George Shoup

Line Judge: David Young

Side Judge: Steve Heiman

Field Judge: Robert "Scooter" Asel

Back Judge: Robert Lewis

Center Judge: Darren Winkley

Replay Official: Judson Howard

Communicator: Bob Bahne

Alternate Official: Tim Crowley

== Game summary ==
=== Scoring summary ===
Scoring summary

Quarter	Time	Drive			Team	Scoring information	Score	
Quarter	Time	Plays	Yards	TOP	Team	Scoring information	ASU	UCF
1	10:59				ASU	B.J. Edmonds recovers blocked punt in the end zone for a touchdown, Sawyer Williams kick good	7	0
1	4:24	6	70	1:54	ASU	22-yard field goal by Sawyer Williams	10	0
1	2:48	3	16	1:36	ASU	Kendall Sanders 28-yard touchdown reception from Justice Hansen, Sawyer Williams kick good	17	0
2	9:31	4	48	1:25	UCF	Taylor Oldham 11-yard touchdown reception from McKenzie Milton, Matthew Wright kick good	17	7
2	1:04	4	3	1:02	UCF	45-yard field goal by Matthew Wright	17	10
3	14:09	3	73	0:51	ASU	Kendall Sanders 75-yard touchdown reception from Justice Hansen, Sawyer Williams kick good	24	10
3	4:52	7	32	2:05	UCF	34-yard field goal by Matthew Wright	24	13
4	14:54	3	37	0:37	ASU	Kendall Sanders 17-yard touchdown reception from Justice Hansen, Sawyer Williams kick good	31	13
"TOP" = time of possession. For other American football terms, see Glossary of American football.							31	13

=== Statistics ===
Statistics	ASU	UCF
First downs	8	17
Plays–yards	64–234	78–223
Rushes–yards	38–29 (0.8)	30–12 (0.4)
Passing yards	205	175
Passing: Comp–Att–Int	12–26–0	26–48–0
Time of possession	31:17	28:43

Team	Category	Player	Statistics
ASU	Passing	Justice Hansen	12/26, 205 yds, 3 TD
ASU	Rushing	Daryl Rollins-Davis	5 car, 32 yds
ASU	Receiving	Kendall Sanders	5 rec, 127 yds, 3 TD
UCF	Passing	McKenzie Milton	22/39, 175 yds, 1 TD
UCF	Rushing	Jawon Hamilton	10 car, 14 yds
UCF	Receiving	Taylor Oldham	5 rec, 56 yds, 1 TD
