= Mario Verduzco =

American football coach

Biographical details
- Born: Pittsburg, California, U.S.
- Education: San Jose State University (1988, 1990)

Coaching career (HC unless noted)
- 1977–1978: Soquel HS (CA) (DB)
- 1979–1981: Soquel HS (CA) (DC/LB/DB)
- 1982–1986: Soquel HS (CA) (DC/QB/WR/LB/DB)
- 1987–1989: Gavilan (OC/QB/WR)
- 1990–1991: San Jose State (GA)
- 1991–1993: De Anza (assoc. HC/OC/QB/WR)
- 1994–1995: De Anza
- 1996–1999: Rutgers (assistant QB/RC)
- 2000: Rutgers (QB/RC)
- 2001–2005: Northern Iowa (QB)
- 2006–2014: Northern Iowa (co-OC/QB)
- 2015: Missouri State (OC/QB)
- 2016–2017: UCF (QB)
- 2018–2021: Nebraska (QB)

Head coaching record
- Overall: 4–15–1

Mario Verduzco is an American college football coach. He was the head football coach for De Anza College from 1994 to 1995. He also coached for Soquel High School, Gavilan, San Jose State, Rutgers, Northern Iowa, Missouri State, UCF, and Nebraska.

== Head coaching record ==
Year	Team	Overall	Conference	Standing	Bowl/playoffs
De Anza Dons (Coast Conference) (1994–1995)
1994	De Anza	2–7–1	1–4	T–5th (North)	
1995	De Anza	2–8	1–4	6th (North)	
De Anza:		4–15–1	2–8		
Total:		4–15–1			
