= UCF Knights football =

Football team representing the University of Central Florida

| 2026 UCF Knights football team |
- First season: 1979; 47 years ago
- Athletic director: Terry Mohajir
- Head coach: Scott Frost; 4th (Note: Scott Frost was the head coach at UCF for two seasons (2016–2017) before leaving the program to coach Nebraska (2018–2022). Frost returned for his second stint with UCF in 2025.) season, 29–19 (.604)
- Location: Orlando, Florida (Note: The main UCF campus has an Orlando mailing address but is entirely located in unincorporated Orange County, Florida.)
- Stadium: Acrisure Bounce House (capacity: 45,906)
- NCAA division: Division I FBS
- Conference: Big 12
- Division: Big 12
- Colors: Black and gold
- All-time record: 309–253–1 (Note: Through November 8, 2026, official NCAA Statistics maintain an all-time record of 307–254–1. The NCAA does not include one of the Knight's wins from 1979 (vs. Fort Benning, because Fort Benning is not a college team and the NCAA views this game as an exhibition). In addition, UCF's 1980 record is disputed. The Carson–Newman Eagles were forced to vacate their opening day 30–21 victory over the Knights due to an ineligible player. The official NCAA Statistics maintain UCF's 1980 full season record as 3–5–1, However, the school and local media claim a record of 4–4–1, interpreting the Eagles vacated win as a Knights win. The NCAA normally does not view vacated wins as a win for the opposing team.) (Note: not including one exhibition game victory against the Russia national American football team in 1992) (.550)
- Bowl record: 6–9 (.400)

National championships
- Claimed: 2017

Conference championships
- C-USA: 2007, 2010 AAC: 2013, 2014, 2017, 2018

Division championships
- C-USA East: 2005, 2007, 2010, 2012 AAC East: 2017, 2018
- Consensus All-Americans: 1
- Rivalries: Cincinnati (rivalry); South Florida (rivalry); UConn (rivalry)

Uniforms
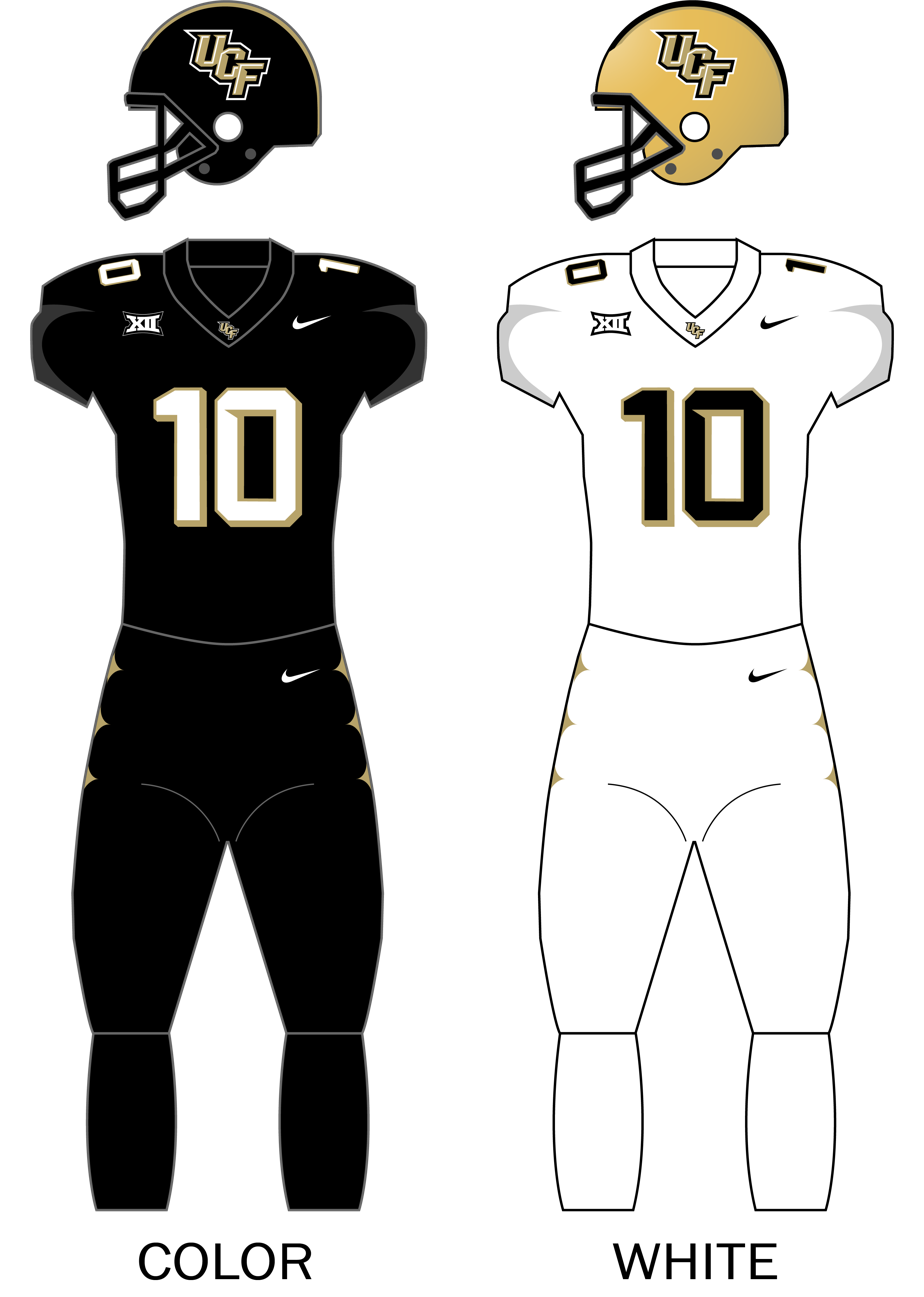
- Fight song: "Charge On"
- Mascot: Knightro
- Marching band: Marching Knights
- Outfitter: Nike
- Website: ucfknights.com

The UCF Knights football team represents the University of Central Florida in the sport of American football. The Knights compete in the Division I Football Bowl Subdivision (FBS) of the National Collegiate Athletic Association (NCAA) and are a member of the Big 12 Conference. The Knights play their home games at 45,906-seat Acrisure Bounce House, which is located on UCF's main campus east of Orlando, Florida, United States.

UCF first fielded a varsity football team in the fall of 1979 as an NCAA Division III program and subsequently completed their ascension to Division I–A, now known as the Division I Football Bowl Subdivision (FBS), in 1996, becoming the first program in NCAA history to have played in all four divisions of football (and the only one until James Madison joined FBS in 2022). As a Division I–AA program, the Knights made the 1990 and 1993 playoffs, and were picked as the preseason No. 1 team to start the 1994 season.

Through November 15, 2026, UCF has compiled 309 claimed victories, six division titles, and six conference championships.

The Knights have made 15 postseason appearances since joining the FBS, including winning one Bowl Championship Series bowl, the 2014 Fiesta Bowl, and one New Year's Six bowl, the 2018 Peach Bowl. The program has produced one Consensus All-American, Kevin Smith in 2007.

== History ==
=== Early history (1979–1984) ===
The UCF football program can be traced back to a speech given by the university's second president, Dr. Trevor Colbourn, in January 1979. Colbourn believed that a successful athletics program would bring the university greater renown, and tasked Dr. Jack O'Leary with the job of creating a new football program at the school. In addition, Colbourn changed the name of the school to the University of Central Florida (prior to this, the college was known as Florida Technological University), to express the university's expanded academic scope.

Beginning at the Division III level, O'Leary, then the university's athletic director, held a meeting of prospective players, who paid $14 per night to stay in the dorms and brought their own uniforms to the tryouts, in March 1979. This would be the first football tryouts for prospective players, and would serve as the first that many students would hear about the new athletic program. O'Leary had previously served as an assistant coach at Alabama under Paul "Bear" Bryant. He would spearhead the effort to raise more than $40,000 to start the program, and would complete a deal for the team to play in the Tangerine Bowl. Without a budget to hire a staff, O'Leary reached out to six UCF graduate students as volunteer assistants. From there, O'Leary was able to lure Don Jonas, a former NFL quarterback and Orlando dignitary, to become UCF's first head football coach on a voluntary basis.

One day during a practice, O'Leary pulled the team aside and unveiled the template for uniforms of "The Fighting Knights". He would reveal a template that would follow the team into the 21st century: black jerseys, gold pants and gold helmets. Less than one year after Colbourn had envisioned a football program for the university, UCF played its first game on September 22, 1979, against St. Leo University. The Knights would prove victorious with a 21–0 shutout, and less than a week later, the Knights would win their first home game by defeating Ft. Benning, 7–6. Jonas led the Knights to a 6–2 inaugural season, behind an average attendance of 11,240, including a Division III record crowd of 14,138. Following the season, in March 1980, Jonas was offered the Knights head coaching job as a full-time position. After leading the team to a 4–4–1 and 4–6 record in 1980 and 1981 respectively, Jonas would leave the Knights following the 1981 season. During the 1980 season, the Knights earned the only tie in program history, an 11–all game against Miles, and Tim Kiggins became the first Knight to sign a professional contract. After his departure, Jonas remained involved in the program, including doing radio broadcasts of UCF football games and a radio sports talk show. Jonas led the Knights to a 14–12–1 (.518) record in three seasons.

Following the departure of Don Jonas, Sammy Weir, who was the head coach at Lake Howell High School, became UCF's new head coach and led the Knights in their move up to Division II in 1982. Another change to the university's athletic programs in 1982 was the departure of O'Leary as athletic director, and the hiring of Bill Peterson, who was the Florida State head coach from 1960 to 1970. In their first season playing Division II ball, the Knights went 0–10, and Weir decided not to return for the 1983 season. One bright spot of the season was that Mike Carter became the first Knight to sign with an NFL team, the Denver Broncos.

Lou Saban replaced Weir as the Knights head coach in 1983. Saban had previously coached at Miami, Army, Northwestern, and in the AFL and NFL with the Buffalo Bills and Boston Patriots, to name just a few. In UCF's first Black and Gold Spring game held in 1983, the defense won 14–6. The Knights finished the 1983 season 5–6, including the team's first win over a Division I–AA opponent. Starting the 1984 season filled with optimism, the Knights were shaken by a 1–6 start. Following the disappointing beginning to the season, Saban stepped away from the program, and was replaced on an interim basis by assistant coach Jerry Anderson. Saban had a 6–12 (.333) record during his tenure as the Knights head coach. Anderson finished out the year with the team in an interim position, with a 1–3 (.250) record. UCF finished the season with a 2–9 mark. In the course of the three seasons following Jonas' departure, the Knights went through three head coaches, and amassed a 7–25 record.

=== Gene McDowell era (1985–1997) ===
Reeling after a disappointing string of seasons, there were discussions within the community about the possibility of dismantling the program, and Peterson announced his retirement as the university's athletic director. In addition, due to financial troubles, the team had to postpone plans to move up to Division I-AA. Without a head coach or athletic director, President Colbourn hired Florida State assistant coach Gene McDowell to fill both positions. McDowell took the helm in 1985, and hired his eventual successor and former Pittsburgh Steelers quarterback Mike Kruczek as his offensive coordinator. The Knights would finish with a 4–7 mark in McDowell's first year, including a 42–21 loss to UCF's first-ever Division I–A opponent, Louisville. Due to financial hardships, McDowell waived half of his annual salary, and FSU head coach Bobby Bowden donated uniforms and cleats to the program.

McDowell would the lead the Knights to their first winning season since 1979, with a 6–5 record in 1986. Also that year, Ted Wilson became the first UCF player to be selected in the 1987 NFL draft, being picked by the Washington Redskins in the 10th round. Following an 8–3 regular season record in 1987, the Knights earned their first trip to the Division II playoffs, where they earned a 1–1 record. After starting the 1988 season with five straight wins, UCF would be ranked No. 2 in Division II. During a game against the defending D-II national champions Troy at the Citrus Bowl, UCF fans were so loud at one point that the Trojans quarterback Bob Godsey couldn't call plays. Godsey complained to the referee about the crowd noise, but instead of helping Troy, the referee called a delay of game penalty on the Trojans. The "Noise Penalty" game is legendary at UCF, and the win over Troy thrust the Knights into the position as the No. 1 ranked team in D-II. Between 1986 and 1990 under the leadership of McDowell, the Knights held a 24–6 record at the Citrus Bowl.

During McDowell's tenure, the program moved up to Division I-AA in 1990. In their first year in the division, the Knights earned a 10–4 record, a program best, and a trip to the I–AA playoffs. UCF would make it to the semifinals, and became the first school in history to qualify for the I–AA playoffs in its first season of eligibility. The Knights would finish the 1991 and 1992 with winning seasons as well. In 1992, Dr. John Hitt, UCF's fourth president, announced that the program would make the move to Division I-A in 1996, and he hired Steve Sloan as the university's new athletic director. Earning their eighth winning season in 1993, the Knights would again make the playoffs. During the season, the team won their first game over a Division I–A team, a 38–16 victory at Louisiana Tech. After another impressive season, UCF was selected as the preseason No. 1 to start the 1994 season. The 1994 season would prove disappointing however, as the Knights would finish the season ranked No. 20 with a 7–4 record. During the team's final season in Division I-AA, the Knights were reinvigorated by freshman sensation Daunte Culpepper. The quarterback would lead the Knights to a 6–5 record, and their tenth straight winning season in 1995.

On September 1, 1996, UCF officially made its foray into Division I-A. At that time, the Knights became the first football program to play in four different NCAA divisions (III, II, I-AA and I-A). In their first two seasons in Division I-A, the Knights posted identical 5–6 records behind Culpepper. In 1997, assistant coach Alan Gooch was named the national assistant coach of the year, due to his work with deaf running back Dwight Collins. In the wake of a federal fraud scandal revolving around improper cellular phone benefits and use, McDowell resigned as head coach on January 20, 1998. Over his 13-year tenure at UCF, McDowell earned an 86–61 (.585) record.

=== Mike Kruczek era (1998–2003) ===
After the abrupt departure of Gene McDowell, offensive coordinator Mike Kruczek was named UCF's new head coach on an interim basis. He would receive the position permanently later in 1998. Daunte Culpepper led UCF to its best season ever with a 9–2 record in 1998 (with losses only coming to Purdue and Auburn). Culpepper finished 6th in the Heisman Trophy voting and set the NCAA record for completion percentage that year (73.4%). Following the season, Culpepper was drafted with the 11th pick in the first round of the 1999 NFL draft by the Minnesota Vikings, marking the highest ever draft pick of a UCF player.

The Knights proved to be a formidable team on the road against heavily favored opponents, with close losses including a 10–6 loss at Auburn in 1998, a 24–23 loss at Georgia in 1999, and a 21–17 loss at Georgia Tech in 2000. Kruczek's biggest victory would come in 2000 against Alabama at Bryant–Denny Stadium in Tuscaloosa, Alabama, when the Knights won 40–38 on a last-second field goal by Javier Beorlegui. After finishing 9–2 in 1998, UCF received a tentative verbal agreement to play in the inaugural Oahu Bowl. That arrangement, however, was contingent on UCLA finishing the season undefeated; the Oahu Bowl was otherwise committed to taking a team from the Pac-10. On the final day of the regular season, Miami upset UCLA, setting off a chain reaction that sent Washington to the Oahu Bowl and left the Knights out in the cold.

Kruczek guided the team as a Division I-A independent until 2002. After six difficult years as an independent, UCF played its much-anticipated first season as a football-only member of the Mid-American Conference in 2002. They finished runner-up in the East division with a 6–2 conference record. They finished the season 7–5 overall, completing their 14th winning season in the past 17 years. The excitement, however, would be short-lived. After signing a three-year contract extension at the beginning of the 2003 season, Kruczek was fired following a 3–7 start. Kruczek was replaced on an interim basis by assistant coach and former player Alan Gooch who finished out the dismal 3–9 season with losses to Mid-American Conference rivals Marshall and Miami (OH). The Marshall game marked UCF's first nationally televised home football game as it was aired on ESPN2. Kruczek ended his six-year stewardship of UCF with a 36–30 (.545) record.

An increased travel burden, lack of competitiveness, and lack of natural rivals within the midwest-based MAC saw UCF begin to explore the possibility of a different conference affiliation after just a couple years in the conference. Furthermore, the UCF athletic department was interested in an all-sports conference membership rather than a football-only affiliation. In 2003, UCF was invited as an all-sports member of Conference USA beginning with the 2005 season.

=== George O'Leary era (2004–2015) ===
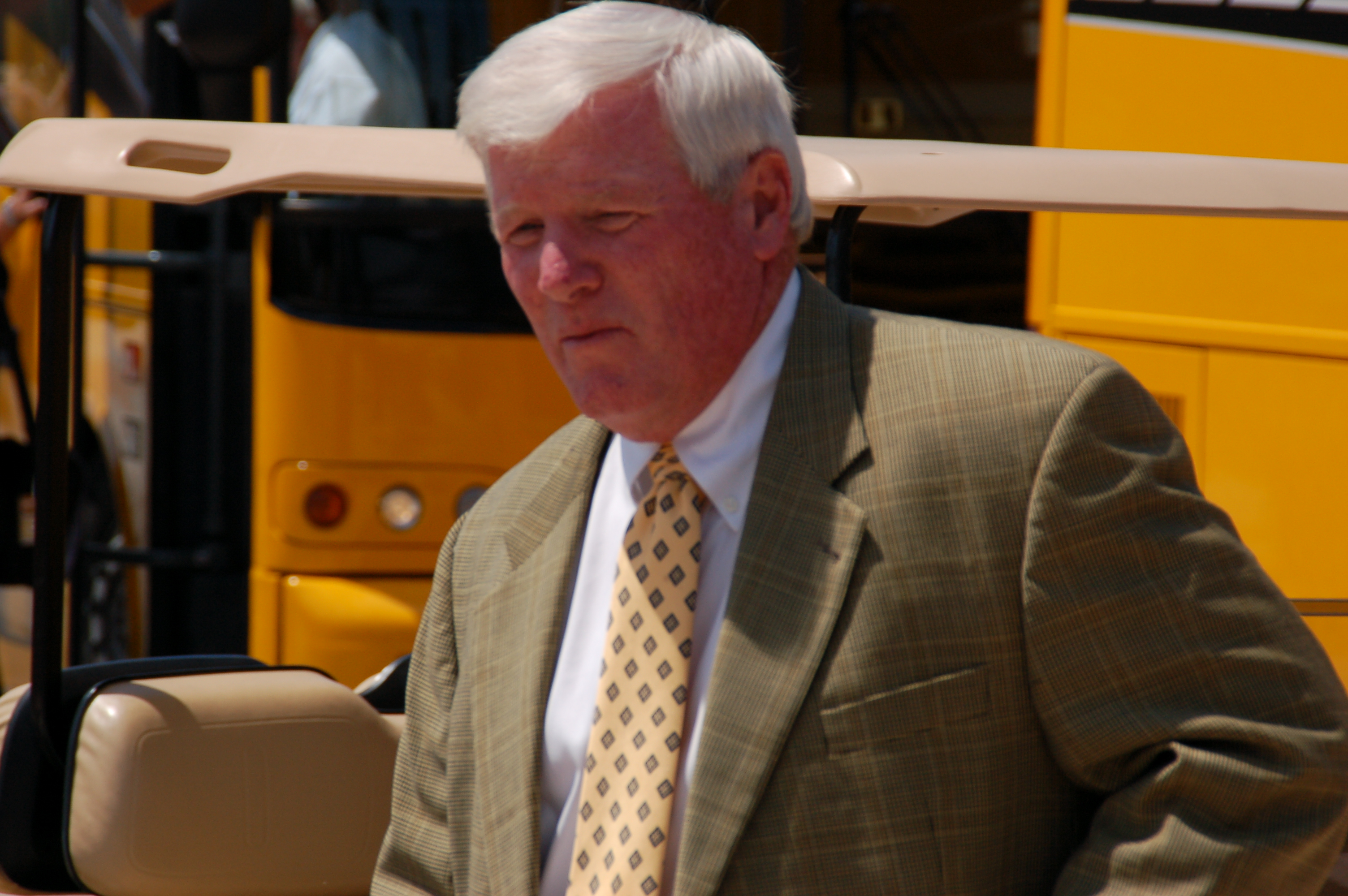
Coach O'Leary

Following the disappointing 2003 season, Minnesota Vikings defensive coordinator and former Georgia Tech head coach George O'Leary was named UCF's head coach in 2004. This was a controversial and bold hire because O'Leary – who left Georgia Tech after the 2001 season – had been named the head coach at Notre Dame. But he resigned in disgrace five days into his tenure with the Fighting Irish after inconsistencies were found on his resume.

The 2004 season was UCF's final year in the MAC. During this transitional period, the team hit rock bottom, going 0–11. But before long, O'Leary would turn the program around. He brought UCF to their first division title, first appearance in a conference championship game, first conference championship title, first bowl appearance (and first bowl victory), as well as a victory in a BCS bowl game. O'Leary was also at the helm when the Knights moved into their new on-campus stadium in 2007.

==== 2005 – Conference USA ====
In 2005, UCF began their first season as a member of Conference USA. Not expected to improve much over 2004, they surprisingly won their first intra-conference game against Marshall, ending the school's 17-game losing streak, then the nation's longest such streak. UCF fans celebrated by storming the field and tearing down the goal posts. Students came back to the campus and celebrated further by jumping into UCF's Reflection Pond (a practice normally reserved for Spirit Splash). UCF finished 8–5 (7–1 in C-USA) winning the East Division and hosting the first ever C-USA Championship game. They lost, 44–27 to Tulsa. UCF was invited to play in their first ever bowl game, the Hawaii Bowl, losing to Nevada 49–48 in overtime due to a missed PAT that would have tied the game. O'Leary was chosen by SportsIllustrated.com for the coach of the year award and received votes for the larger Bobby Dodd Award. In May 2006, UCF extended O'Leary's contract for ten years and increased his pay to $1 million per year plus incentives after he engineered the fourth-best single-season turnaround in college football history.

==== 2007 ====
The team rebranded in 2007 in preparation for its move to its new on-campus stadium. They permanently dropped the "Golden" from their name, becoming the "UCF Knights". UCF notched their second victory over an AQ school (NC State), then inaugurated their new stadium by hosting No. 6 Texas, narrowly losing by a score of 35–32. The Knights finished 10–4 overall and won the East Division again, hosting the Championship game against Tulsa. UCF defeated Tulsa 44–25, earning UCF's first ever Conference Championship and a received berth in the 2007 Liberty Bowl.

Running back Kevin Smith set an NCAA record with 450 rushing attempts and rushed for 2,567 yards, placing him 2nd on the all-time single season rushing list behind only Oklahoma State's Barry Sanders. Smith became UCF's first consensus All-American. He declared for the 2008 NFL draft. and was selected with the first pick in the third round by the Detroit Lions.

==== 2008 ====
On March 18, 2008, running back Ereck Plancher collapsed shortly after a conditioning drill, and was then transported to a nearby hospital where he died approximately one hour later. ESPN's Outside The Lines program on November 2, 2008, interviewed players who were at the training session at which Plancher became ill, and which after he died, and stated that the session was longer and far more rigorous than O'Leary and other UCF Athletics officials have admitted to publicly. They also alleged that O'Leary and other coaches had initially warned players off from providing assistance to Plancher when he became visibly distressed. After a 14-day trial in 2011, a jury found the UCF Athletics Association guilty of negligence in the death of Plancher. The jury awarded each of his parents $5 million. Upon appeal, however, the Florida Supreme Court sided with the University of Central Florida, ruling that sickle-cell disease caused the death and the university didn't owe any money to Plancher's family.

==== 2009–2010 ====
After a lackluster 4–8 season in 2008, UCF bounced back with an 8–5 record in 2009, Among those wins was their first victory over a nationally ranked team, beating then No. 12 Houston on November 14 by a score of 37–32. UCF finished with a 45–24 loss to Rutgers in the St. Petersburg Bowl, their third bowl appearance in five years.

Entering the 2010 season, with the recruitment of Jeffrey Godfrey and return of key seniors, including Bruce Miller, there were high hopes for the Knights. After winning five straight games, and posting an 11-game conference winning streak, the Knights were ranked for the first time in school history. UCF won 7 of their last 8 games and clinched their third C-USA East Division crown.

The Knights would go on to win the 2010 C-USA championship game, defeating SMU 17–7. Following the win, UCF entered the BCS standings for the first time in program history, ranking No. 25. The Knights ended the 2010 season with a 10–6 victory over Georgia in the Liberty Bowl, the team's first-ever bowl victory. UCF ended the season ranked 20th in the final Coaches Poll and 21st in the final AP Poll.

==== 2011–2012 ====
The 2011 season proved disappointing as UCF finished with a 5–7 record and they were not bowl eligible for the first time since 2008. Both Jeff Godfrey and Blake Bortles battled for playing time at the quarterback position. Godfrey planned on transferring after the season, but instead decided to transition to the wide receiver position. In 2012, the Knights finished 10–4 and won their fourth C-USA East Division crown. They lost the championship game 33–27 in overtime to Tulsa. UCF would play in the Beef 'O' Brady's Bowl and won 38–17 over Ball State behind four touchdown passes by game MVP Blake Bortles.

==== 2013 – American Athletic Conference ====
On December 7, 2011, UCF was invited to join the Big East Conference. However, within a year's time, the breakup of the Big East resulted in UCF ultimately becoming a member of the successor conference known as the American Athletic Conference (AAC or The American) in all sports beginning in 2013. In the meantime, UCF was facing investigation into recruiting violations by previous athletic director Keith Tribble during 2011. The NCAA imposed a one-year bowl ban, a $50,000 fine, probation, reduction of scholarships, and tighter limits on football recruiting visiting days. O'Leary and the UCF athletic department lobbied for a one-year delay of the bowl ban, while they filed an appeal. On April 19, 2013, UCF won its appeal with the NCAA and was eligible for postseason play in 2013.

The appeal would prove crucial, as in 2013, O'Leary led the Knights to their first twelve-win season (12–1), first perfect intra-conference record (8–0), first win against a Big Ten opponent (Penn State), first win against a Top–10 team (No. 8 Louisville), and won the inaugural AAC Championship. Importantly, due to contractual obligations stemming from the aforementioned Big East realignment, the 2013 season would be the lone year in which the AAC champion would be an Automatic Qualifier for a Bowl Championship Series bowl game.

Ranked No. 15, UCF secured a berth in the Fiesta Bowl on New Year's Day against No. 6 Baylor. As a 16½ point underdog, the game was one of the biggest upsets of the BCS era. The Knights defeated the Bears 52–42 behind three touchdown runs by Storm Johnson and three touchdown passes by game MVP Blake Bortles. UCF was ranked No. 10 in the final AP Poll, the highest ranking in school history. Blake Bortles would be drafted in the first round (3rd overall) by Jacksonville in the 2014 NFL draft.

==== 2014–2015 ====
UCF finished 9–4 in 2014, finishing as co-champions of the AAC. The Knights kicked off the season at the Croke Park Classic in Dublin, Ireland against Penn State. The Knights lost to the Nittany Lions 26–24, by a field goal as time expired. After starting 0–2, the Knights won nine of their next ten games. The regular season ended in dramatic fashion as UCF defeated ECU on a last-second Hail Mary pass. O'Leary's Knights accepted a bid to the St. Petersburg Bowl, a game they lost to NC State by a score of 34–27.

The 2015 season, which began with high hopes, would be a shocking failure. George O'Leary was named interim athletic director, briefly holding both the head coach and AD positions. After losing their first eight games, O'Leary resigned. Quarterbacks coach Danny Barrett was named interim head coach for the remaining four games. UCF finished the 2015 season 0–12, its third winless campaign in program history.

Despite ending on a low note, O'Leary nevertheless reshaped the UCF football program in regards to success on the football field, discipline, as well as improved academic results in the classroom. Under O'Leary's leadership, the UCF football team set new school records for team GPA. O'Leary finished with 81 wins with UCF, second only to Gene McDowell (86).

=== First Scott Frost era (2016–2017) ===
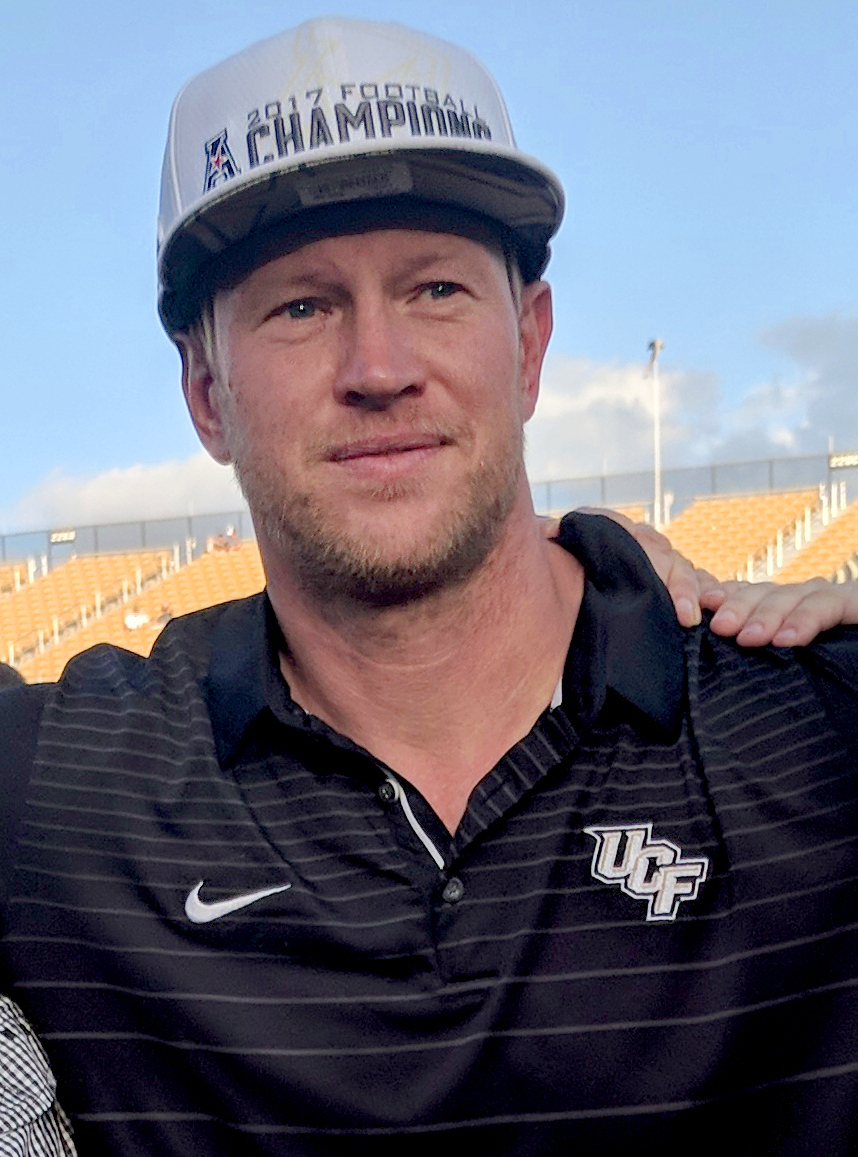
Coach Frost

After an extensive search, Oregon offensive coordinator Scott Frost was named UCF's sixth head coach (not counting interim coaches) on December 1, 2015. Serving under head coach Mark Helfrich, Frost had overseen one of college football's most explosive offenses at Oregon, won multiple Pac-12 conference championships, coached quarterback Marcus Mariota into a Heisman Trophy winner in 2014, and saw many of his players go to the NFL. All this after a successful collegiate playing career at quarterback for Stanford and Nebraska in the 1990s and as a safety in the NFL for five seasons.

==== 2016 ====
Frost won his UCF debut with a 38–0 shutout over FCS opponent South Carolina State, which snapped a 13-game losing streak. The Knights notched wins against FIU, ECU, UConn, Tulane, and Cincinnati, earning bowl eligibility. The Knights faced Arkansas State in the Cure Bowl, which was played across town at Camping World Stadium, the Knight's former home stadium. They lost 31–13 to finish with a record of 6–7. McKenzie Milton emerged as the starting quarterback, winning the job over Justin Holman.

==== 2017 ====
Surprising even himself, Frost and his team went on to an undefeated regular season in 2017, defeating FIU, Maryland, Memphis, Cincinnati, East Carolina, Navy, Austin Peay, SMU, UConn, Temple, and rival USF in a War on I-4 shootout. The Knights were supposed to play Memphis on September 9, but due to Hurricane Irma battering the state of Florida that weekend, the game, which originally had been moved up one day to September 8, was rescheduled for September 30. In order to reschedule the American Athletic Conference game, UCF canceled their scheduled game with Georgia Tech, leaving the team with only 11 regular season games as opposed to the usual 12. The breakout season for Frost and his team made him one of the most sought-after coaches on the market, drawing interest from Florida and his alma mater, Nebraska. Frost passed on the Florida job but avoided questions about returning to Nebraska. In the 2017 American Athletic Conference Football Championship Game, Frost's team went on to play Memphis for the second time and won the title in a 62–55 double overtime thriller, securing UCF's third conference championship win.

Just hours after winning the AAC, sources confirmed that Frost would be taking a seven-year, $35 million deal to become Nebraska's new head coach. Frost and his staff returned for one last game in the 2018 Peach Bowl. The No. 12 ranked Knights faced No. 7 ranked Auburn, and defeated them 34–27 to close out their undefeated season with a 13–0 record. After the win, UCF athletic director Danny White claimed a national championship for the team, while the Colley Matrix, an NCAA-recognized major selector, also ranked UCF as the number-one team of the season on its final ranking. The team celebrated with a parade at Walt Disney World. Additionally, the team's coaches were paid bonuses for their performance, the school hung a national championship banner in Spectrum Stadium and gave out national champion rings. The claim sparked considerable controversy and debate over whether the College Football Playoff should be expanded.

=== Josh Heupel (2018–2020) ===
On December 5, 2017, Missouri offensive coordinator Josh Heupel was named UCF's head football coach. Heupel arrived in Orlando having overseen offenses at both Missouri and his alma mater Oklahoma. UCF signed Heupel to a five-year contract worth a fully guaranteed $1.7 million in annual base salary. Heupel would finish with a 28–8 record in three seasons with UCF, including one conference championship game victory, one bowl win, and appearance in a New Year's Six bowl.

==== 2018 ====
In Heupel's first season, UCF rode its high-powered offense to start the season 12–0 and extend its winning streak to a school-record (and nation-leading) 25 games. In their rivalry game at South Florida, star quarterback McKenzie Milton suffered a serious knee injury, eventually requiring multiple surgeries to save the leg. Milton was out for the season, and never played another down for UCF, eventually transferring to Florida State. Back-up quarterback Darriel Mack Jr. took over and guided the Knights to win that game as well as the Conference championship game a week later against Memphis. The undefeated and 8th-ranked Knights were again not selected for the College Football Playoff, instead facing LSU in the Fiesta Bowl. Without Milton, the Knights lost 40–32 to future Heisman winner Joe Burrow and the Tigers.

==== 2019–2020 ====
In Heupel's second season, Dillon Gabriel emerged as the new starting quarterback. After a 3–0 start, UCF snapped a 27-game regular season winning streak with a last-second loss at Pitt. UCF dropped out of the Top 25 for the first time in two years. UCF finished the season defeating Marshall in the Gasparilla Bowl, and ranked 24th in the final AP and Coaches polls.

In the pandemic-shortened 2020 season, Heupel's Knights again started the season ranked, but dropped out of the Top 25 after two consecutive losses. UCF snapped a 21-game home winning streak, but still posted a winning record for the fourth straight year. They finished 6–4 after a lopsided loss to BYU in the Boca Raton Bowl. On January 21, 2021, UCF athletic director Danny White left the university to become the new athletic director at the University of Tennessee. One week later, one of his first acts as AD was to hire Josh Heupel away from UCF to become the new head coach for the Volunteers.

=== Gus Malzahn (2021–2024) ===
On February 15, 2021, new athletic director Terry Mohajir named Gus Malzahn as UCF's new head football coach. The two had previously worked together at Arkansas State, and Malzahn made a name for himself with a 68–35 record at Auburn (2013–2020), including three wins over Alabama in the Iron Bowl, an appearance in the 2014 BCS National Championship Game, and two New Year's Six bowl appearances. His Auburn team lost to UCF in the 2018 Peach Bowl. Malzahn would post a mediocre 28–24 record in four seasons, including one bowl victory.

==== 2021–2022 (AAC) ====
In 2021, Malzahn won in his debut with the Knights, a come-from-behind win over Boise State. The season was nearly derailed by a rash of injuries, including to starting quarterback Dillon Gabriel. The Knights finished 9–4 (3rd in AAC) including a win against Florida in the Gasparilla Bowl.

In his second season (UCF's final year in the AAC), Malzahn's Knights started off 8–2 with wins over #20 Cincinnati and #17 Tulane. Ranked #20, they suffered a stinging loss against Navy, which prevented them from hosting the AAC Championship Game. The Knights lost the conference championship in a rematch to Tulane 45–28. They faced Duke in the Military Bowl, losing 30–13, finishing the year with a 9–5 record.

==== 2023–2024 (Big 12) ====
In 2023, UCF officially moved into the Big 12 Conference. In doing so, the Knights became the first NCAA football program to play at every sanctioned level: Division III, Division II, Division I-AA, Division I-A (Independent), Group of Five, and Power Five. UCF finished their inaugural Big 12 season with a record of 6–7, becoming the only Big 12 newcomer to be bowl eligible but lost to Georgia Tech in the Gasparilla Bowl.

In 2024, UCF started the season 3–0 including a 21-point comeback conference win at TCU. However, the Knights lost 8 of their last 9 games, falling to 4-8 and failed to become bowl-eligible for the first time since 2015. This was also Malzahn's first season failing to make a bowl game as head coach in his career. On November 30, 2024, following a 28–14 loss to Utah, Malzahn resigned from his job as head coach at UCF to become the offensive coordinator at Florida State.

=== Second Scott Frost era (2025–present) ===
After a brief coaching search, UCF re-hired Scott Frost, who coached the Knights football team in 2016–2017. After a dismal five-year tenure at Nebraska, Frost was briefly working as a senior analyst at the Los Angeles Rams. He began a rebuild with new players at almost every skill position. The Knights saw huge roster turnover from the previous season, with no less than 70 new players for 2025, most from the transfer portal. Predicted to finish 7th in the Big 12, the Knights got off to a 3–1 start, and finished 5–7 in 2025.

In 2026, after a 3–3 start, Frost led the Knights to their highest-ranked victory in program history. UCF defeated #2 BYU 39–31 in double overtime, their first win against a top-5 team. Two weeks later, with a 33–32 victory at Kansas, the Knights snapped a 12-game road losing streak, which dated back to the Malzahn era.

== Conference affiliations ==
- NCAA Division III independent (1979–1981)
- NCAA Division II independent (1982–1989)
- NCAA Division I-AA independent (1990–1995)
- NCAA Division I-A independent (1996–2001)
- Mid-American Conference (2002–2004)
- Conference USA (2005–2012)
- The American (2013–2022)
- Big 12 Conference (2023–present)

== Championships ==
=== National championship claim ===
In 2017 UCF completed a 13–0 perfect season. The Knights were not selected for the College Football Playoff, instead completing their season with a New Year's Day win in the Peach Bowl over No. 7 Auburn. Afterwards, UCF athletic director Danny White stated that UCF would claim the 2017 national championship. Several other outlets followed suit, including the Orlando Sentinel, Orlando radio station WYGM, and Prince George Journal. Florida Governor Rick Scott signed a resolution officially recognizing the Knights as national champions on January 8. The Knights were honored for their unbeaten season at the 2018 Pro Bowl, Walt Disney World, and honored by Orlando Mayor Buddy Dyer.

On January 9, 2018, the Colley Matrix, an NCAA-recognized Major Selector, and an algorithm used as part of the BCS computer rankings in 2011, ranked UCF No. 1. Alabama won the CFP and eleven of the twelve NCAA-recognized major selectors. UCF won one of the twelve NCAA-recognized major selectors. They were also presented with the Zuppke Award, which is given to the National Champion selected by the Touchdown Club of Columbus. Official NCAA Football Bowl Subdivision Records list UCF as a "Final National Polls Leader" rather than a "National Champion" for the 2017 season, as it reserves the term "National Champion" (or "Co-National Champion") for teams who finish the season ranked first in one or more of the "consensus polls": AP, Coaches Poll, NFF/FWAA (Note: NFF and FWAA conducted separate polls prior to 2014, but are now the same poll. Each poll was considered a consensus poll prior to their merger.) and, formerly, the UPI. UCF is the first school to claim a championship that was not awarded by one of the consensus polls since Ole Miss in 1962.

| Season | Conference | Coach | Selector | Overall record | Conference record | Bowl | Opponent | Result |
|---|---|---|---|---|---|---|---|---|
| 2017 | American | Scott Frost | Colley Matrix | 13–0 | 8–0 | Peach Bowl | Auburn | W 34–27 |

=== Conference championships ===
Under head coach George O'Leary, the Knights won two Conference USA Championships (2007, 2010). Both of these resulted in an berth to play in the Liberty Bowl. At the time, the C-USA champion customarily received a berth to play in the Liberty Bowl against a member of the SEC. O'Leary also led the Knights to the American Athletic Conference championship in their first year in that league (2013), earning the conference's automatic berth to a BCS bowl game. In 2013–2014, The American did not contest a conference championship game, rather the champion was determined as the team(s) with the best intra-conference record. In 2014, the Knights clinched back-to-back titles, finishing in a three-way tie for first place, and were declared conference co-champions.

The American Athletic Conference, known since the 2025 season as the American Conference, adopted a conference championship game beginning in 2015, and the Knights made three appearances. The Knights won the conference championship in 2017 under head coach Scott Frost, and again in 2018 under head coach Josh Heupel, for the program's second pair of back-to-back conference titles. As of 2025, UCF has not yet made an appearance in the Big 12 Championship Game. In its brief membership in the MAC, UCF never reached the MAC Championship Game.

| Season | Conference | Coach | Overall record | Conference record | Championship Game result |
|---|---|---|---|---|---|
| 2007 | Conference USA | George O'Leary | 10–4 | 7–1 | W 44–25 |
| 2010 | Conference USA | George O'Leary | 11–3 | 7–1 | W 17–7 |
| 2013 | American | George O'Leary | 12–1 | 8–0 | — |
| 2014 † | American | George O'Leary | 9–4 | 7–1 | — |
| 2017 | American | Scott Frost | 13–0 | 8–0 | W 62–55^{2OT} |
| 2018 | American | Josh Heupel | 12–1 | 8–0 | W 56–41 |

† Co–champion

=== Division championships ===
Under head coach George O'Leary, the Knights won four Conference USA East Division crowns (2005, 2007, 2010, 2012), and subsequently made four appearances in the Conference USA Championship Game, more than any other CUSA school, with the last being in 2012. Three of the four appearances were against Tulsa of the West Division. The Knights won two of the four CUSA Championship Games in which they appeared.

After moving to the American Athletic Conference (American), UCF won two more division titles. In 2022, after the American had eliminated divisions, UCF qualified for a third American Conference Championship Game appearance by finishing the regular season as the #2 seed.

Prior to UCF joining the Big 12 (2023), that conference had long since eliminated divisions. Since then, all other FBS conferences except the Sun Belt Conference have followed suit.

| Season | Division | Coach | Opponent | Championship Game result |
|---|---|---|---|---|
| 2005 | Conference USA East | George O'Leary | Tulsa | L 27–44 |
| 2007 | Conference USA East | George O'Leary | Tulsa | W 44–25 |
| 2010 | Conference USA East | George O'Leary | SMU | W 17–7 |
| 2012 † | Conference USA East | George O'Leary | Tulsa | L 27–33 |
| 2017 | American East | Scott Frost | Memphis | W 62–55^{2OT} |
| 2018 | American East | Josh Heupel | Memphis | W 56–41 |

† Co–championship

== Bowl games ==
UCF has played in 15 bowl games and has compiled a 6–9 record in those games. Since elevating to Division I FBS, UCF has been bowl-eligible for 19 of 28 seasons, and received their first bowl invitation in 2005. The Knights nearly earned a bowl berth in 1998, when Daunte Culpepper led the team to a 9–2 record. UCF has been ranked going into their bowl game four times, being ranked No. 24 in 2010 (Liberty), No. 15 in 2013 (Fiesta), No. 10 in 2017 (Peach), and No. 7 in 2018 (Fiesta). In 2019, though they had slipped out of the top 25 prior to the game, the Knights won their bowl game (Gasparilla) and placed No. 24 in the final rankings. In 2020, they were ranked No. 21 in the preseason poll and in week 4 they were ranked the highest at No. 11 but lost to unranked Tulsa and they fell out of the rankings; in week 16 they were unranked but they received votes, but after a loss in their bowl game (Boca Raton), they didn't receive any votes and were unranked in the final rankings.

| Season | Coach | Bowl | Opponent | Result |
|---|---|---|---|---|
| 2005 | George O'Leary | Hawaii Bowl | Nevada | L 48–49^{OT} |
| 2007 | George O'Leary | Liberty Bowl | Mississippi State | L 3–10 |
| 2009 | George O'Leary | St. Petersburg Bowl | Rutgers | L 24–45 |
| 2010 | George O'Leary | Liberty Bowl | Georgia | W 10–6 |
| 2012 | George O'Leary | Beef 'O' Brady's Bowl | Ball State | W 38–17 |
| 2013 | George O'Leary | Fiesta Bowl † | 6 Baylor | W 52–42 |
| 2014 | George O'Leary | St. Petersburg Bowl | NC State | L 27–34 |
| 2016 | Scott Frost | Cure Bowl | Arkansas State | L 13–31 |
| 2017 | Scott Frost | Peach Bowl † | 7 Auburn | W 34–27 |
| 2018 | Josh Heupel | Fiesta Bowl † | 11 LSU | L 32–40 |
| 2019 | Josh Heupel | Gasparilla Bowl | Marshall | W 48–25 |
| 2020 | Josh Heupel | Boca Raton Bowl | 16 BYU | L 23–49 |
| 2021 | Gus Malzahn | Gasparilla Bowl | Florida | W 29–17 |
| 2022 | Gus Malzahn | Military Bowl | Duke | L 13–30 |
| 2023 | Gus Malzahn | Gasparilla Bowl | Georgia Tech | L 17–30 |

† New Year's Six/BCS game

== Playoffs ==
=== NCAA Division I-AA playoffs ===
The Knights appeared in the Division I–AA playoffs twice with a record of 2–2.

| Season | Coach | Playoff | Opponent | Result |
|---|---|---|---|---|
| 1990 | Gene McDowell | First Round; Quarterfinals; Semifinals | Youngstown State; William & Mary; Georgia Southern | W 20–17; W 52–38; L 44–7 |
| 1993 | Gene McDowell | First Round | Youngstown State | L 30–56 |

=== NCAA Division II playoffs ===
The Knights appeared in the Division II playoffs once with a record of 1–1.

| Season | Coach | Playoff | Opponent | Result |
|---|---|---|---|---|
| 1987 | Gene McDowell | Quarterfinals; Semifinals | Indiana (PA); Troy State | W 12–10; L 10–31 |

== Head coaches ==
UCF has had 12 head coaches since organized football began in 1979. Gene McDowell, George O'Leary, Scott Frost, and Josh Heupel have led the Knights to the postseason. O'Leary, Frost, and Heupel have coached the team to an FBS conference championship, and a BCS/NY6 bowl game. Before leading UCF in 1983 and 1984, Lou Saban was a head coach in both the American Football League (AFL) and the NFL. O'Leary also coached in the NFL between 2002 and 2004.

| Coach | Tenure | Overall Record | Bowl/Playoff Record | Pct |
|---|---|---|---|---|
| Don Jonas | 1979–1981 | 14–12–1 | | .537 |
| Sammy Weir † | 1982 | 0–10 | | .000 |
| Lou Saban | 1983–1984 | 6–12 | | .333 |
| Jerry Anderson † | 1984 | 1–3 | | .250 |
| Gene McDowell | 1985–1997 | 86–61 | 3–3 | .585 |
| Mike Kruczek | 1998–2003 | 36–30 | | .545 |
| Alan Gooch † | 2003 | 0–2 | | .000 |
| George O'Leary | 2004–2015 | 81–68 | 3–4 | .544 |
| Danny Barrett † | 2015 | 0–4 | | .000 |
| Josh Heupel | 2018–2020 | 28–8 | 1–2 | .778 |
| Gus Malzahn | 2021–2024 | 28–24 | 1–2 | .538 |
| Scott Frost | 2016–2017; 2025–present | 29–19 | 1–1 | .604 |

† – denotes interim coach

== Venues ==
=== Citrus Bowl (1979–2006) ===
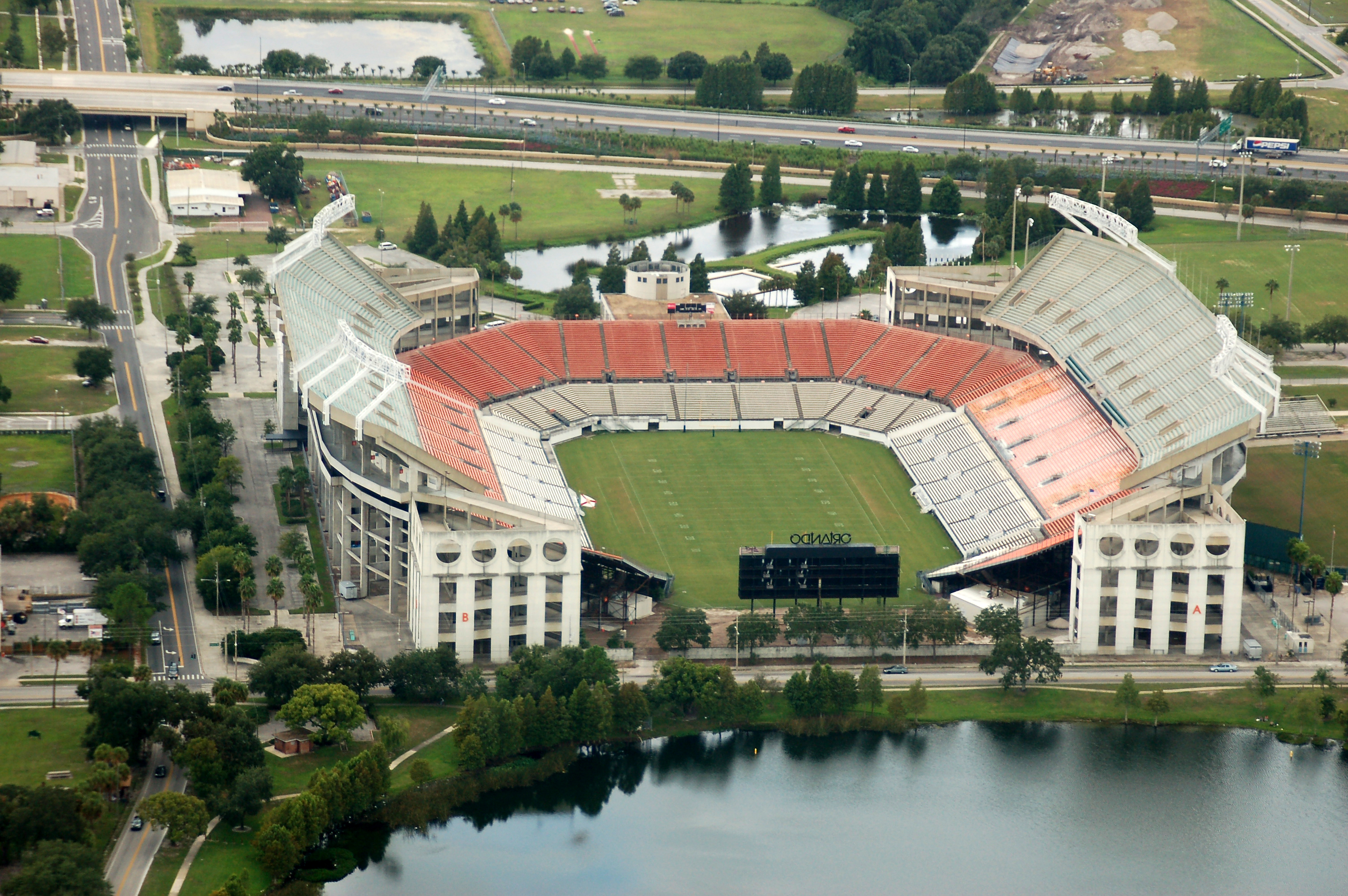
Camping World Stadium, the Knights' home field from 1979 to 2006

From 1979 to 2006, the Knights played their home games at the Citrus Bowl in downtown Orlando. Located about 15 miles (24 km) from UCF's main campus, the stadium originally opened in 1936, and is the home of the Citrus Bowl Game and other neutral site games. UCF played its first football game at the stadium in September 1979, a 7–6 victory over Fort Benning.

By 2004, City of Orlando officials and UCF's administration expressed dissatisfaction with the dilapidated condition of the facility. While UCF was the primary leasing tenant of the Citrus Bowl for 25 years, they received little revenue from football games, and the stadium's capacity (65,000) was considered too large for the Knights. With an average attendance of 20,000–30,000 spectators per game, the stadium was left with a mostly empty appearance. The Knights' record home attendance of 51,987 (set at the 2005 C-USA Championship) was still far short of capacity. The location off campus was considered a significant factor in the inability to sustain a sizeable student section, while the stadium's upper decks were rarely occupied for UCF games.

When the university approached the city about possible renovations and new revenue-sharing measures for the stadium, they were met with resistance. The city generally wanted UCF to stay, but expected them to help pay for the upgrades to the facility. At one point during the negotiations, stadium officials told then UCF Athletic Director Steve Orsini that "the value of UCF's fans was nothing". Though the city had expressed interest in renovating the Citrus Bowl with or without UCF's support, funding was seriously in doubt. The city was in the planning stages for a new arena, new performing arts center, and "creative village", with stadium renovations seemingly taking less and less priority.

The Knights compiled an overall record of 112–60–1 (.650) at the Citrus Bowl, which includes Division II playoff games in 1987, a Division I-AA playoff game in 1990, the 2005 C-USA Championship Game and the 2016 Cure Bowl. In 2014, after UCF had departed, the facility was substantially renovated, and renamed Camping World Stadium.

=== Acrisure Bounce House (2007–present) ===
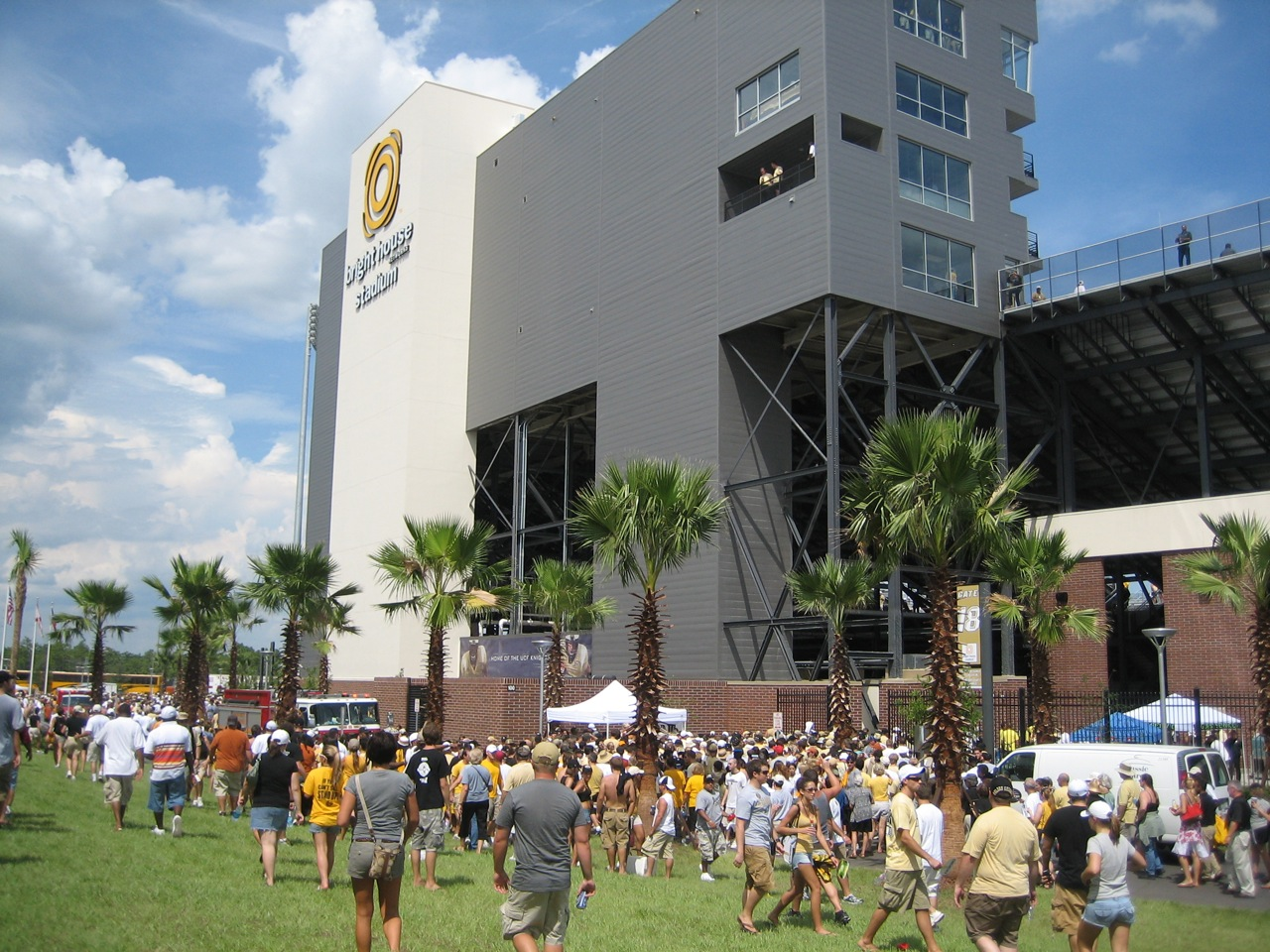
Acrisure Bounce House, the Knights home field since 2007.

In 2005, in response to the dilapidated state of the Citrus Bowl, its distance from UCF's main campus, and lack of revenue derived from the games played there, UCF formally proposed building an on-campus stadium. Additional motivations included drawing more students to the games, a more intimate setting, and establishing game-day traditions on campus. In December 2005, the UCF Board of Trustees approved the construction of a new on-campus stadium. The new stadium, at the time named Bright House Networks Stadium, was originally planned to open in time for the 2006 football season, but neighborhood opposition delayed construction by a year.

Stadium construction was finished in 2007. The first home-game took place on September 15, 2007, as the Knights nearly upset the No. 6-ranked Texas Longhorns. Following the 2014 season, the stadium underwent $8 million in renovations. A $90 million expansion of Roth Tower began in December 2024, with renovations completed in time for the 2026 season. With the Roth Tower expansion, the current seating capacity of the stadium is 45,906.

The facility's nickname is the Bounce House due to it being susceptible to considerable shaking when the crowd jumps in unison. Measures were undertaken following the stadium's inaugural season to reduce these effects to ensure safety. On May 31, 2022, FBC Mortgage entered a ten-year, $19.5 million naming rights deal. On July 1, 2025, the FBC Mortgage company was rebranded to Acrisure, and the stadium was renamed Acrisure Bounce House.

Through November 15, 2026, UCF has compiled an overall record at the stadium of 94–34 (.734).

== Rivalries ==
Though UCF remains a relatively young program that has shifted conferences several times, it has several long-standing rivalries with schools throughout the duration of Conference USA and The American. The university's biggest rival historically is their instate rival, the University of South Florida Bulls, played from 2005 to 2008, and since 2013.

One other unofficial rivalry, known as the Civil Conflict, exists between UCF and UConn. However, UCF does not acknowledge the rivalry, and has publicly dismissed it.

=== South Florida (USF) ===
The War on I-4 dates years before the two schools ever played a game against each other. The matchup was the subject of much discussion and fan enthusiasm since the 1990s, though the first game was not played until 2005. The rivalry, often known as the "War on I-4" or "I-4 Corridor Clash", continued as a four home-and-away series through the 2008 season. The Bulls won each of the four games, which all drew strong crowds, but South Florida declined to continue the series after 2008. The UCF–South Florida game resumed as a regular conference game beginning with the 2013 season, as UCF joined the American Athletic Conference. The Knights won the first game as conference members 23–20 before 45,952 in Orlando. In 2014, the Knights won for the first time at Raymond James Stadium, and delivered the first home shut-out in South Florida history, 16–0. In 2015, South Florida defeated the UCF Knights 44–3 to finish a winless 0–12 season for the second time in UCF history. In 2016, the War On I-4 trophy was introduced for the first time. USF took home the trophy by defeating UCF 48–31 and clinching their first 10-win season in school history, only for UCF to take the trophy back from them the following year.

UCF leads South Florida 8–6 in the football series through the 2022 season.

=== Cincinnati ===
As of October 11, 2025, Cincinnati currently leads the rivalry between the two schools 6–5, since their first meeting in 2015. Both teams have competed against one another in the Big 12 Conference since 2023.

== Traditions ==
=== Space Game ===
Since 2017, the UCF Knights have traditionally set aside one home game at the Acrisure Bounce House to celebrate the university's ties to NASA, the nearby Kennedy Space Center, and the foundation/governance of the Florida Space Institute. During the planning stages of the university, the school was even nicknamed "Space U". Dubbed the "Space Game", players wear special uniforms and helmets with space-themed designs and logos. Uniforms may include a replica mission patch, constellations, names of astronauts, and other images and graphics related to space exploration. In most years, pursuant to the theme, the game is scheduled as a night game.

The 2018 Space Game marked the first appearance of the Citronaut logo on UCF's football uniform. The Citronaut was the university's first sports mascot when the school was known as Florida Technological University (FTU). Just hours before the 2020 Space Game, a SpaceX Falcon 9 rocket launch took place, which was visible from the stadium. The 2022 Space Game was also the milestone 100th UCF home game played at the Acrisure Bounce House.

Through 2026, the Knights are 8–2 in the "Space Game". On multiple occasions, UCF's space-themed uniforms/helmets have been voted and recognized as among the best in all of college football. While UCF's traditional colors are black and gold, the Space Game has established Canaveral Blue as an official alternate jersey color across all varsity sports.

| Season | Date | Time | Visiting team | | Home team | | Attendance | TV | Uniform theme | Ref |
|---|---|---|---|---|---|---|---|---|---|---|
| 2017 | October 14 | 7:15 p.m. | East Carolina | 21 | #22 UCF | 63 | 40,287 | CBSSN | Mission I: "Reach for the Stars" – Pegasus patch | |
| 2018 | November 1 | 7:30 p.m. | Temple | 40 | #12 UCF | 52 | 41,153 | ESPN | Mission II: "A Familiar Flight" – Constellations, first appearance of the Citronaut | |
| 2019 | November 2 | 12:00 p.m. | Houston | 29 | UCF | 44 | 41,361 | ESPN2 | Mission III: "Rendezvous with the Stars" – Hand-painted Moon helmet | |
| 2020 | October 24 | 2:00 p.m. | Tulane | 34 | UCF | 51 | 9,148 | ESPN2 | Mission IV: "Innovation & Ingenuity" – Orion spacecraft blueprints | |
| 2021 | October 22 | 7:00 p.m. | Memphis | 7 | UCF | 24 | 39,328 | ESPN2 | Mission V: "Discovery" – 40th anniversary of Space Shuttle program | |
| 2022 | October 13 | 7:00 p.m. | Temple | 13 | UCF | 70 | 41,729 | ESPN | Mission VI: "Into the Darkness" – Spitzer Space Telescope, Exoplanet exploration | |
| 2023 | November 11 | 7:00 p.m. | #15 Oklahoma State | 3 | UCF | 45 | 44,046 | ESPN | Mission VII: "Reaching New Horizons" – "Canaveral" blue jerseys and trousers | |
| 2024 | November 2 | 3:30 p.m. | Arizona | 12 | UCF | 56 | 42,110 | FS1 | Mission VIII: "Powering Humankind's Return to the Moon" – Orion, Pegasus, Lunar regolith, Artemis SLS booster | |
| 2025 | November 7 | 8:00 p.m. | Houston | 30 | UCF | 27 | 44,206 | FS1 | Mission IX: "Hyperspace" – Hypersonic travel, HADES, MXOD, Shock diamonds, Carbon | |
| 2026 | October 30 | 7:30 p.m. | Baylor | 41 | UCF | 9 | 45,906 | ESPN | Mission X: "Origin Story" – Space suits from Project Mercury, Project Gemini, and the Apollo program | |
UCF overall record: 8–2

== Honors and notable people ==
=== All-Americans ===
Every year, several publications release lists of their ideal "team". The athletes on these lists are referred to as All-Americans. The NCAA recognizes five All-American lists. They are the Associated Press (AP), American Football Coaches Association (AFCA), Football Writers Association of America (FWAA), Sporting News (TSN), and the Walter Camp Football Foundation (WCFF). UCF has had numerous players honored as first team All-Americans. To date, Kevin Smith is the only Consensus All-American.

| Name | Position | Season | Publication(s) |
|---|---|---|---|
| Daunte Culpepper | QB | 1997 | NFL Draft Report |
| Kevin Smith | RB | 2007 | AP, FWAA, WCFF, TSN, SI, ESPN, CBS Sports, CFN, Scout.com |
| Joe Burnett | KR | 2008 | ESPN, SI |
| Quincy McDuffie | KR | 2012 | SI |
| Jacoby Glenn | CB | 2014 | AP |
| Mike Hughes | KR | 2017 | FWAA |
| Shaquem Griffin | LB | 2017 | AFCA |
| RJ Harvey | RB | 2024 | AP |

=== Conference honors ===
Coach of the Year
| Season | Conference | Coach |
|---|---|---|
| 2005 | Conference USA | George O'Leary |
| 2007 | Conference USA | George O'Leary |
| 2010 | Conference USA | George O'Leary |
| 2013 | The American | George O'Leary |
| 2017 | The American | Scott Frost |

Offensive Player of the Year
| Season | Conference | Player |
|---|---|---|
| 2007 | Conference USA | Kevin Smith |
| 2013 | The American | Blake Bortles |
| 2017 | The American | McKenzie Milton |
| 2018 | The American | McKenzie Milton |

Defensive Player of the Year
| Season | Conference | Player |
|---|---|---|
| 2009 | Conference USA | Bruce Miller |
| 2010 | Conference USA | Bruce Miller |
| 2012 | Conference USA | Kemal Ishmael |
| 2014 | The American | Jacoby Glenn |
| 2016 | The American | Shaquem Griffin |

Special Teams Player of the Year
| Season | Conference | Player |
|---|---|---|
| 2008 | Conference USA | Joe Burnett |
| 2012 | Conference USA | Quincy McDuffie |

Freshman of the Year
| Season | Conference | Player |
|---|---|---|
| 2005 | Conference USA | Kevin Smith |
| 2010 | Conference USA | Jeff Godfrey |
| 2014 | The American | Tre'Quan Smith |

=== Heisman Trophy ===
Quarterbacks Daunte Culpepper and McKenzie Milton, and running back Kevin Smith are the only Knights to finish in the Top–10 of voting for the Heisman Trophy.

| Season | Name | Position | Finish |
|---|---|---|---|
| 1998 | Daunte Culpepper | QB | 6th |
| 2007 | Kevin Smith | RB | 8th |
| 2017 | McKenzie Milton | QB | 8th |
| 2018 | McKenzie Milton | QB | 6th |

=== Honored numbers ===
UCF retires a student-athlete's jersey but does not retire the respective jersey numbers. The Knights coaching staff can choose to reissue a given number, as the retirement of the jersey does not require that the number not be worn again.

UCF Knights honored numbers
| No. | Player | Pos. | Tenure | Ref. |
|---|---|---|---|---|
| 1 | Wayne Densch (Note: He was a philanthropist.) | —N/a | —N/a | |
| 8 | Daunte Culpepper | QB | 1995–1998 | |
| 19 | Joe Burnett | CB | 2005–2008 | |
| 24 | Kevin Smith | RB | 2005–2007 | |

=== Other national honors ===
| Recipient | Position | Season | Award(s) | Ref. |
|---|---|---|---|---|
| Dwight Collins | TB | 1997 | Disney's Wide World of Sports Spirit Award | |
| Alan Gooch | TB | 1997 | AFCA Assistant Coach of the Year Award | |
| Scott Frost | Head Coach | 2017 | AFCA Coach of the Year Award; Associated Press College Football Coach of the Year Award; Eddie Robinson Coach of the Year Award; Home Depot Coach of the Year Award; Paul "Bear" Bryant Award; Touchdown Club of Columbus Woody Hayes Trophy | |
| McKenzie Milton | QB | 2017 | Archie Griffin Award | |
| Shaquem Griffin | LB | 2017 | Senior CLASS Award; Touchdown Club of Columbus Male Athlete of the Year; NCAA Inspiration Award | |
| Mac Loudermilk | P | 2018 | Peter Mortell Holder of the Year Award | |

=== UCF Athletics Hall of Fame ===
Football members of the UCF Athletics Hall of Fame are as follows:

| Class | Name | Position |
|---|---|---|
| 2000 | Sean Beckton | WR; Assistant coach |
| 2000 | Bill Giovanetti | LB |
| 2002 | Daunte Culpepper | QB |
| 2002 | Shawn Jefferson | WR |
| 2002 | Scott Ryerson | K |
| 2003 | Willie English | RB |
| 2003 | David Rhodes | WR |
| 2004 | Mike Gruttadauria | C |
| 2005 | Franco Grilla | K |
| 2005 | Marquette Smith | TB |
| 2006 | Alan Gooch | DB; Assistant coach |
| 2006 | Rick Hamilton | LB |
| 2008 | Ed O'Brien | K |
| 2008 | Darrell Rudd | DL |
| 2009 | Sylvester Bembery | DL |
| 2009 | Bob Spitulski | OLB |
| 2010 | Elgin Davis | RB |
| 2010 | Michael O'Shaughnessy | DE |
| 2011 | Bernard Ford | WR |
| 2011 | Greg Jefferson | DE |
| 2011 | Jorge Magluta | DL |
| 2013 | Dan Burke | C |
| 2013 | Don Jonas | Head coach |
| 2015 | Asante Samuel | CB |
| 2019 | Brandon Marshall | WR |
| 2019 | George O'Leary | Head coach |
| 2019 | Kevin Smith | RB |
| 2021 | Blake Bortles | QB |
| 2021 | Josh Sitton | OL |
| 2022 | Joe Burnett | CB |
| 2022 | Latavius Murray | RB |
| 2023 | Gene McDowell | Head coach |
| 2024 | Mark Giacone | RB |
| 2024 | Shaquem Griffin | LB |
| 2025 | Mike Sims-Walker | WR |
| 2025 | Alex Haynes | RB |
| 2025 | Cornell Green | OT |
| 2026 | Mike Kruczek | Head coach |
| 2026 | McKenzie Milton | QB |

=== Notable in other fields ===
| Name | Position | Occupation |
|---|---|---|
| Parker Boudreaux | OL | Professional wrestler; former AEW and WWE performed in NXT as Harland |
| Cal Bloom | TE | Professional wrestler; performed in WWE as Von Wagner |
| Michael Lynche | DT | Singer; finished fourth on season 9 of American Idol |

== Knights in the NFL ==
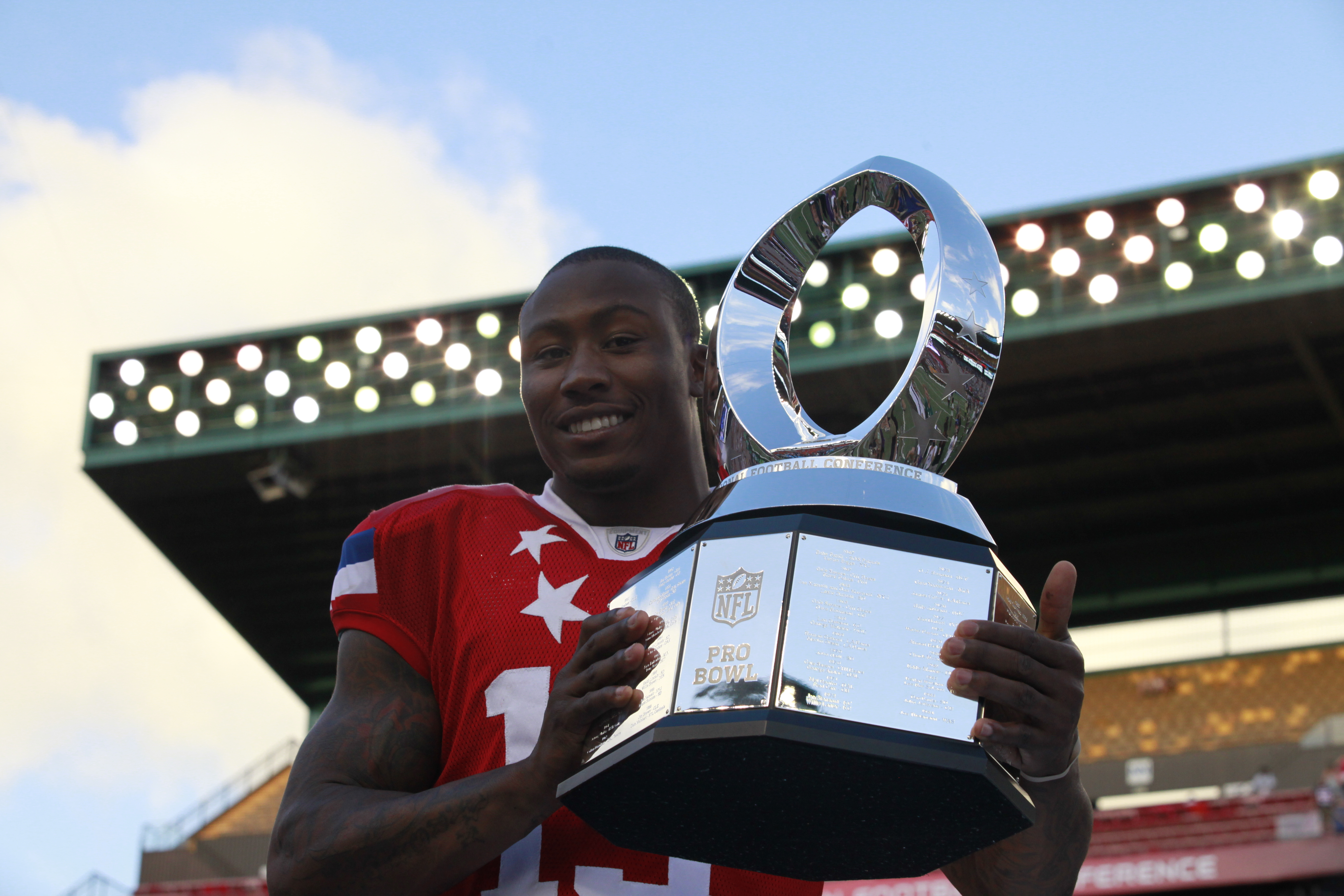
Brandon Marshall, UCF Athletics Hall of Fame (2019)

First round draft picks

| Name | Position | Year | Overall pick | Team |
|---|---|---|---|---|
| Daunte Culpepper | QB | 1999 | 11 | Minnesota Vikings |
| Blake Bortles | QB | 2014 | 3 | Jacksonville Jaguars |
| Breshad Perriman | WR | 2015 | 26 | Baltimore Ravens |
| Mike Hughes | CB | 2018 | 30 | Minnesota Vikings |
| Malachi Lawrence | EDGE | 2026 | 23 | Dallas Cowboys |

=== Active NFL ===
As of October 2026

- Ricky Barber, Washington Commanders
- Kalia Davis, Cleveland Browns
- Tylan Grable, Buffalo Bills
- RJ Harvey, Denver Broncos
- Mike Hughes, Atlanta Falcons
- Brandon Johnson, Pittsburgh Steelers
- Nyjalik Kelly, Green Bay Packers
- Malachi Lawrence, Dallas Cowboys
- Mac McWilliams, Philadelphia Eagles
- Myles Montgomery, New England Patriots
- Paul Rubelt, Tampa Bay Buccaneers
- Alex Ward, Las Vegas Raiders

== Schedule ==
UCF joined the Big 12 Conference in 2023 after ten seasons in the American Athletic Conference. UCF is one of 16 full members for football, and the Big 12 maintains a nine-game regular season intra-conference schedule. The conference announced a four-year scheduling matrix on November 1, 2023. Each team will play each other team in the conference at least once both home and away over the four-year period. Geography will be prioritized in order to minimize travel disruption. UCF will have five intra-conference home games in 2024 and 2026, and four in 2025 and 2027. UCF's budding rivalry with Cincinnati was not officially protected, but the two teams will play three out of the four seasons. They will also play Baylor, BYU, Colorado, Iowa State, and West Virginia three times.

UCF's intra-conference opponents through 2027 will be as follows:

| Season | Home | Away |
|---|---|---|
| 2026 | Arizona State, Baylor, BYU, Iowa State, TCU | Colorado, Houston, Kansas, Oklahoma State |
| 2027 | Cincinnati, Colorado, Kansas State, Texas Tech | Arizona, Baylor, Iowa State, Utah, West Virginia |

=== Future non-conference opponents ===
Officially announced out-of-conference schedules as of September 15, 2026. Since the Big 12 maintains a nine-game intra-conference schedule, the Knights will play three out-of-conference games annually. Furthermore, the conference requires at least one of the three out-of-conference games to be against a Power Four opponent.

In July 2021, UCF and the Florida Gators jointly announced a three-game series. The first game was played at Gainesville in 2024. The teams are scheduled to play at Orlando in 2030, and at Gainesville again in 2033. In August 2022, UCF announced they would host James Madison in 2029. In February 2023, FAU and UCF agreed to reschedule a planned 2025 meeting until 2028, opening up a date for UCF.

On May 2, 2024, UCF announced the scheduling of home-and-home series with Northwestern (Big Ten) and Pitt (ACC).

| 2027 | 2028 | 2029 | 2030 | 2031 | 2032 | 2033 |
|---|---|---|---|---|---|---|
| Louisiana (Sat. Aug. 28) | Maine (Thu. Aug. 31) | UMass (TBA) | FIU (Sat. Sept. 7) | Northwestern (Sat. Sept. 6) | | at Florida (Sat. Sept. 3) |
| at North Carolina (Sat. Sept. 4) | at Northwestern (Sat. Sept. 9) | James Madison (Sat. Sept. 8) | Florida (Sat. Sept. 14) | | | |
| UT-Martin (Sat. Sept. 11) | FAU (Sat. Sept. 16) | Pitt (Sat. Sept. 15) | | | | |

Power Four opponent

Group of Six opponent

FCS opponent

== See also ==
- UCF Knights football statistical leaders
- UCF Knights
- American football in the United States
