= Centric =

Centric may refer to:

- BET Her, an American cable channel known as Centric from 2009 until 2017
- Centric Multimedia, Greek company also known as Centric and Centric Holdings S.A
- Centric (magazine), free student magazine of the University of Central Florida in Orlando, Florida
- Centric (software), a well-known brand of Product life-cycle management (marketing) software
