= Central Florida Future =

İndependent weekly student newspaper of the University of Central Florida in Orlando

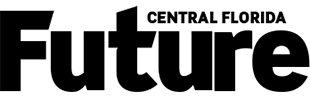

- The front page of Central Florida Future on March 31, 2011 in its former broadsheet format.
- Type: Weekly student newspaper
- Format: Tabloid
- Owner: Florida Today (Gannett)
- Founded: October 7, 1968
- Ceased publication: August 4, 2016
- Language: English
- Headquarters: Orlando, Florida, U.S.
- Circulation: 14,000 (as of Fall 2014)
- OCLC number: 36698772
- Website: www.ucfnews.com

The Central Florida Future was the independent weekly student newspaper of the University of Central Florida in Orlando, Florida. The Future was one of the largest student-run newspapers in the United States, with a circulation of 14,000 and readership of over 30,000. It was a member of the USA Today network.

The paper printed every Thursday during the fall, spring, and summer semesters. The Future was founded as the university's official newspaper shortly after it opened in 1968. The Future has been financially and editorially independent from the university since 1992. The paper was purchased by Florida Today, which is owned by Gannett, in 2007. Only students from UCF were allowed to be employed by the paper. In addition, the paper gave priority to enrolled college students for work in the editorial department, to be an advertising representative or serve as an intern.

The Future was distributed free on UCF's campuses, as well as around Orlando and Oviedo. The paper contained a mix of campus and local news coverage, as well as national and international stories from wire services. It also contained a sports section, entertainment section, and an opinion section. The Future was printed in a tabloid format, similar to that of Boston Herald and the Daily Mail.

On July 21, 2016, Gannett announced it was shutting down the newspaper, with its final issue being printed on August 4.

== History ==
=== Early years ===
FTU Knights logo, ca. 1978

The Future was in publication since the first day of class held at the Orlando campus in 1968. The name of The Future was derived from the original name of the University of Central Florida, Florida Technological University (FuTUre). The words Central Florida were added after the school changed its name to the University of Central Florida in 1978. The school changed its name to the University of Central Florida in 1978. The newspaper added Central Florida to the name in its August 28, 1985 issue. The Future held its offices in the UCF Library just as many other organizations did in the early years of the university's history, then to portables where Sumter Hall now stands, and eventually moved off campus.

When the university first opened, students had no choice for the mascot. The Citronaut was the unofficial mascot for FTU's first year, appearing on only official publications, like the cover of the 1968–69 student handbook. After a year, students petitioned the student government for a new mascot.

In response, The Future published what its staffers felt were important criteria for a new mascot: an animal that flew, as the school motto is "Reach for the Stars", it should also be virtuous, include the school colors of black and gold, and it should be something unique because "FTU stressed the importance of individuality."

Shortly thereafter, a student health center nurse, Judy Hines, followed the criteria and came up with Vincent the Vulture. This mascot stuck for a year before the school administration and students decided on a new official mascot, "Knights of the Pegasus."

=== Independence ===
In 1993, The Future was made independent of UCF by being spun off as an independent company, Knight Newspapers, Inc. At the time, the company also held ownership of the Seminole Chronicle. In February 2007, Florida Today purchased Knight Newspapers, Inc. which included the Central Florida Future. Florida Today is owned by Gannett, which made The Future the second student-run university paper to be purchased by Gannett, the first being the FSView & Florida Flambeau of Florida State University.

Subsequent to the sale, offices moved to the Central Florida Research Park, which is located directly south of UCF's main campus. After purchasing The Future, Gannett moved three other products within the same office as The Future, including The Seminole Chronicle, a weekly newspaper covering Seminole County, Moms Like Me, a monthly magazine for mothers, and Saves, a coupon booklet packaged with The Future.

=== Recent history ===
In early 2016, The Future moved its headquarters to an office building at the intersection of University Boulevard and Rouse Road, a mile from UCF.

For its June 23, 2016 issue, The Future dedicated its entire issue to coverage of the Orlando nightclub shooting.

== Circulation ==
As late as 2013, The Future printed 20,000 copies for each issue during the fall and spring semesters, and distributed the papers throughout campus and in the surrounding area through the use of more than 200 newspaper boxes. For the fall 2009 semester, budget cuts and the economic recession forced the paper to cut printing from Monday, Wednesday, and Friday during the fall and spring semesters, and switch to Monday and Thursday publishing for all semesters. In August 2014, the paper announced that it would become a weekly publication, with release every Thursday, and that production would shift from the broadsheet to tabloid format.

The Future was an affiliate of UWIRE, a wire service produced by student journalists at more than 800 colleges and universities across the United States, giving the paper access to news, sports, features, entertainment, and opinion articles by the other members.

== Awards ==
In Spring 2010, at the Society of Professional Journalists region three conference, the staff of the "Central Florida Future," at the time led by Editor-in-Chief Jeffrey Riley, was awarded two first-place awards. The first award was for "Best All-Around Non-Daily Student Newspaper", and the second was for "Best Affiliated Website." Both awards had not been won by The Future before. Also at the conference, writers for The Future won first and second-place awards for "Online Sports Reporting", first place in "Feature Writing", and first place in "Sports Writing".

In Spring 2016, The Future was recognized as "Best All-Around Non Daily Student Newspaper" for Region 3. Two months later, the Society of Professional Journalists named The Future a national finalist, placing them in the top three student newspapers in the country in the "Best All-Around Non Daily" category.

Author Roger Darnell (Film/RTV, 1990) contributed an original weekly humor column to The Future called "Observations" between August, 1989, and December, 1990. Directly related to one of his entries, Roger was awarded a Scripps-Howard Foundation Fellowship in 1990.

In Spring 1986, at the Columbia University School of Journalism and Columbia Scholastic Press Association’s College Gold Circle Awards, The Central Florida Future led by Jeff Glick won numerous awards for overall design, news design, features design, informational graphics and special acknowledgement for Collection of Work by Glick.

== See also ==
- Centric
- List of student newspapers in the United States
- Pegasus
- The Florida Review
- WUCF-FM
- WUCF-TV
