= Centric (magazine) =

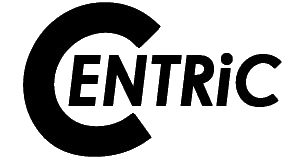

- The inaugural Spring 2011 edition of Centric
- Managing Editor: Andy Zunz
- Categories: Student Magazine
- Frequency: Biannually – 2× yearly
- Circulation: 1,000 (5,000 readers)
- Founded: 2010; 16 years ago
- First issue: April 19, 2011; 15 years ago
- Company: University of Central Florida
- Country: United States
- Based in: Orlando, Florida
- Language: English
- Website: centric.cos.ucf.edu/

Centric is the official student magazine of the University of Central Florida in Orlando, Florida, United States. It is freely available on the university's campuses and online.

The magazine is published biannually in the fall and spring by students and faculty of the Nicholson School of Communication, which is a part of UCF's College of Sciences. The first issue of the magazine was published in the Spring of 2011.

== Content ==
Centric's content is primarily targeted to cater for its student demographic, and often examines innovative, interesting, or provocative people in the UCF community, such as students, faculty, and alumni. It often explores the unique programs of the university, such as Knightro and the Pegasus, and the daily lives of those in the UCF community. The magazine is advertised as "100 percent created and produced by students, for students."

== See also ==
- The Florida Review
- Central Florida Future
