= Danny White (athletic director) =

American athletic director (born 1979)

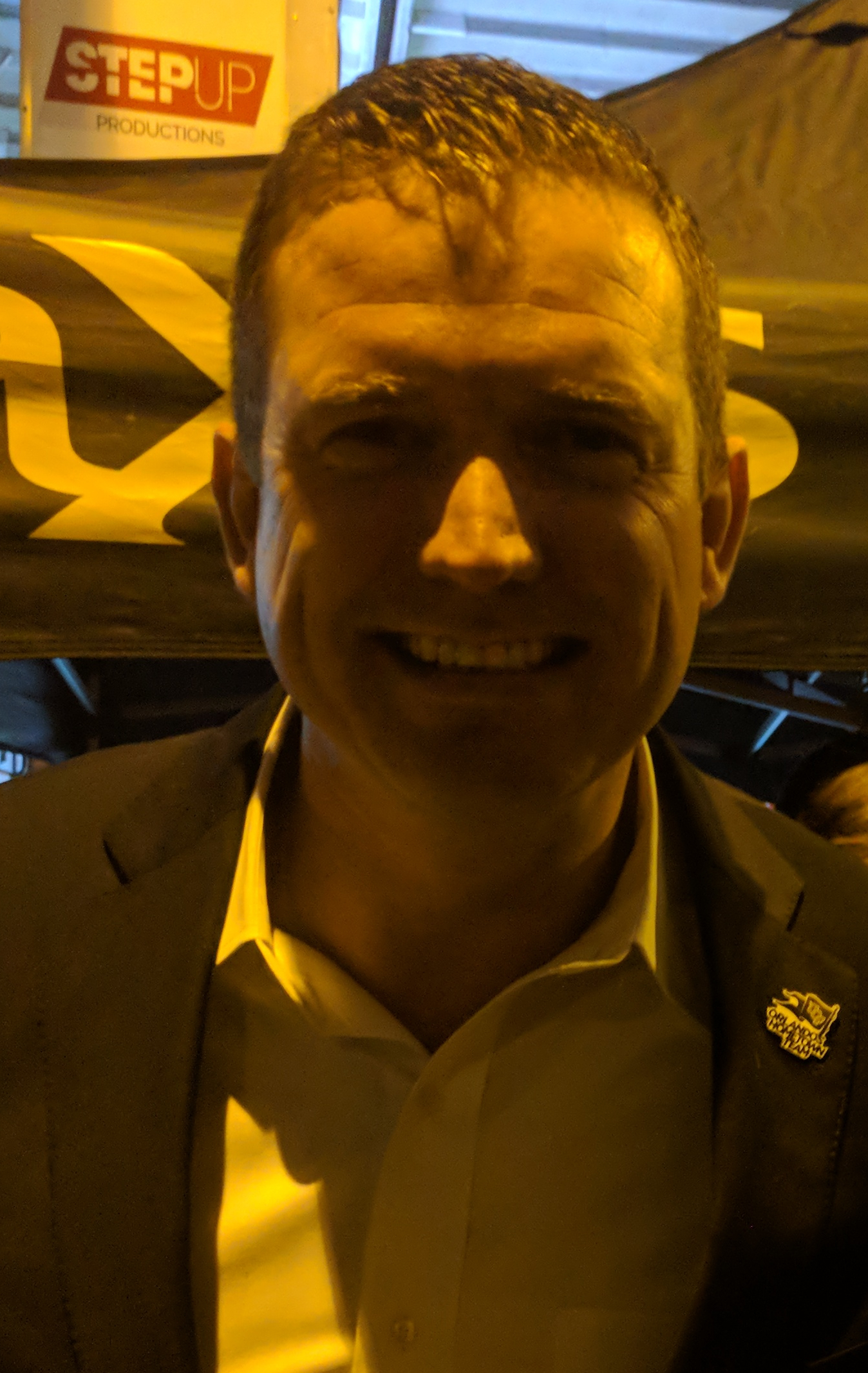
- White in 2018

Current position
- Title: Athletic director
- Team: Tennessee
- Conference: SEC

Biographical details
- Born: October 28, 1979 (age 46); Morehead, Kentucky, U.S.

Playing career

Basketball
- 1998–2000: Towson
- 2000–2002: Notre Dame
- Position: Guard

Coaching career (HC unless noted)
- 2005–2006: Ohio (assistant)

Administrative career (AD unless noted)
- 2004–2005: Ohio (dir. of basketball ops.)
- 2006–2007: Northern Illinois (assistant AD)
- 2007–2009: Fresno State (associate AD)
- 2009–2012: Ole Miss (senior associate AD)
- 2012–2015: Buffalo
- 2015–2021: UCF
- 2021–present: Tennessee

Daniel J. White (born October 28, 1979) is an American university sports administrator. He is the athletic director for the Tennessee Volunteers. White held the same position at the University at Buffalo from 2012 to 2015 and the University of Central Florida from 2015 to 2021. Prior to his tenure at Buffalo, he was the senior associate athletic director for Ole Miss.

== Early life and college career ==
Danny has been heavily surrounded by college athletics throughout his life. Born in Morehead, Kentucky when his father Kevin was a track coach at Morehead State University, he moved many times during his father's later career as a coach and athletic director—to Cape Girardeau, Missouri (Southeast Missouri State University), Dubuque, Iowa (Loras College), Orono, Maine (University of Maine), New Orleans (Tulane University), and Tempe, Arizona (Arizona State University). After Danny's graduation from high school, his father went on to become AD at the University of Notre Dame, and then the same position at Duke University. His brother Mike White is the head coach of the Georgia Bulldogs men's basketball team, while his other brother Brian is athletic director for the Virginia Tech Hokies, and his sister Mariah Chappell is assistant athletic director for the SMU Mustangs.

White attended Towson University for three years (1998–2001) and was on the basketball team, but saw limited playing time and also suffered from major knee problems, missing all of the 1999–2000 season and playing only one game in 2000–01. He transferred to Notre Dame, playing there for one season. He graduated from Notre Dame in 2002, majoring in business administration, and from Ohio University, receiving master's degrees in both business administration and sports administration. He completed his doctorate from the University of Mississippi in 2016.

== Administrative career ==
=== Non-AD positions ===
Prior to his first athletic director position, White was the senior associate athletic director at the University of Mississippi, worked on development (fundraising) at Fresno State, and worked as an administrator at other Mid-American Conference schools, Ohio University and Northern Illinois University.

=== University at Buffalo ===
White's first athletic director position was for the Buffalo Bulls, where he was at the forefront of Buffalo's rebranding to become "New York's big time athletics department". He initiated a long-term capital funding project to develop Buffalo's athletic facilities, notoriety, reputation, and stature to represent the State of New York. During his time as Athletic Director, White restructured Buffalo's athletic department through its management and coaches. His most notable change was the replacement of Reggie Witherspoon for Bobby Hurley, a former 2-time NCAA champion with Duke University and son of star coach Bob Hurley.

White's coaching hires also included Lance Leipold and Nate Oats at Buffalo. His coaching hires drew national attention from Andy Staples, citing him as the best AD in hiring. His tenure at UB was a rousing success.

=== University of Central Florida ===
In November 2015, White was hired as the athletic director of the UCF Knights, replacing interim AD George O'Leary (who replaced previous AD Todd Stansbury). In the position, White also was the executive vice president for the University of Central Florida Athletics Association, the private non-profit corporation that is responsible for the administration and financial management of the UCF Knights athletic programs. As UCF's director of athletics, White oversaw the hiring of a new head football coach, Scott Frost, and was given responsibility of raising over $70 million in athletic facility construction and upgrades. In addition to Frost's hiring, White's administration also oversaw the hiring of current men's basketball coach Johnny Dawkins, baseball coach Greg Lovelady, and Frost's successor Josh Heupel.

In 2016, he and South Florida Bulls AD Mark Harlan oversaw the creation of an official "War on I–4" competition series, rebranding the long-running unofficial rivalry between the two schools. UCF had a record 25-game win streak during White's tenure.

==== UCF football national championship claim ====
White generated significant media attention, both positive and negative, for himself and UCF by declaring the 2017 UCF Knights football team national champions in a January 1, 2018, Twitter video published moments after their Peach Bowl victory over the Auburn Tigers, reinforcing the claim the following day with national champions branding on UCF's verified accounts and plans to hold a Disney World parade, hang a national champions banner at Spectrum Stadium, and pay the assistant coaching staff bonuses for their performance. The claim (Note: The NCAA recognizes the Alabama Crimson Tide as the 2017 national champions, with the final AP and coaches polls ranking UCF no. 6 and no. 7, respectively. However, UCF was ranked no. 1 by the Colley Matrix, a selector of national champions. However, the NCAA does not officially recognize any other selector of national champions.) came in response to UCF not being selected for the College Football Playoff despite an undefeated season and conference championship. The claim sparked debate over whether the College Football Playoff should be expanded to include teams such as UCF that are not in Power Five conferences. Still, the supposed championship was celebrated with a Disney World parade, coaches' bonuses and national champion rings. Reactions to White's claim extended past the sports world to the Florida state legislature, with Florida governor Rick Scott signing a resolution declaring UCF national champions on January 8, 2018.

=== University of Tennessee ===
On January 21, 2021, White was hired as athletic director at the University of Tennessee. One of his first acts as AD was to hire Josh Heupel away from UCF to become the Volunteers' new head football coach.

Tennessee won its first SEC All-Sports Trophy in 2022. Tennessee's success across the board earns honors for 2022-23 athletic season. The Vols captured their second SEC All-Sports Trophy in 2023. Off the field, Tennessee athletics eclipsed the 200M mark in revenue for the first time under White's leadership. Dubbing UT as the "Everything school", White's broad-based approach has led to success across the board in Knoxville.The 2022-23 athletic year included the best finish in Tennessee history in the Learfield Directors' Cup, as UT finished No. 6 nationally. Record fundraising has become the norm under White as well on Rocky Top. A new strategic plan was announced by White on Rocky Top as well with Rise Glorious. Tennessee led the SEC in football attendance in 2023.

Sports Business Journal named White its Athletic Director of the Year in 2025. In a May 2025 interview, he called for student athletes to unionize and engage in collective bargaining.
