= Seminole Chronicle =

- Type: Weekly newspaper
- Format: Broadsheet
- Owner: Florida Today
- Editor: Jessica Saggio (Managing Editor), Steven Ryzewski (Sports Editor)
- Founded: 2004
- Headquarters: Orlando, Florida, United States
- Circulation: Thursday: 10,000
- Website: www.seminolechronicle.com

The Seminole Chronicle was a weekly community newspaper that served Oviedo and Winter Springs, Florida, United States. The Chronicle published each Thursday with a circulation of 10,000 copies.

The Chronicle was founded in 2004 by the Knight Newspapers company and was purchased in 2007 by Florida Today, which is owned by Gannett. Florida Today ceased publication of the Chronicle on July 31, 2014.

== History ==
=== Origins ===
The Seminole Chronicle began publication in July 2004, with a goal to compete directly with the Seminole Voice, another Oviedo-based newspaper. Founding editor Alex Babcock created the newspaper as part of the Knight Newspapers company, which also owned the Central Florida Future, the University of Central Florida's campus newspaper.

The Seminole Chronicle mainly served the Seminole County, Florida communities of Oviedo and Winter Springs, but also delivered to Chuluota and Geneva.

The Chronicle had five sections: News, Lifestyles, Sports, Viewpoints and Classifieds. The primary goal of the newspaper was to deliver hyper-local, community news to residents in the coverage area.

=== Florida Today Purchase ===
In February 2007, Florida Today purchased Knight Newspapers, Inc. which included the Central Florida Future and the Seminole Chronicle. Florida Today is owned by Gannett.

=== Office ===
After purchasing the Chronicle, Gannett moved the Chronicle's production offices to High Tech Drive, within the Research Quadrangle. Gannett also moved in three other products within the same office: The Central Florida Future, a bi-weekly student newspaper covering University of Central Florida, Moms Like Me, a monthly magazine for mothers, and Saves, a coupon booklet packaged with the Future and the Chronicle. Moms Like Me was discontinued in 2011.

The office address was 11825 High Tech Avenue Orlando, Florida 32817. The phone number was 407-447-4555.

== Circulation ==
The Chronicle printed 10,000 copies every Thursday year-round, and distributed the papers throughout the surrounding areas of Oviedo and Winter Springs through the use of newspaper boxes and home delivery. In 2011, the newspaper adopted a free home delivery model through the Orlando Sentinel. Papers were distributed to select neighborhoods in Oviedo, Winter Springs, Geneva and Chuluota as well as on racks scattered throughout the community.
