= The Florida Review =

American literary magazine

- Discipline: Literary journal
- Language: English
- Edited by: Lisa Roney

Publication details
- History: 1972 to present
- Publisher: University of Central Florida (United States)
- Frequency: Biannual

Standard abbreviations
- ISO 4: Fla. Rev.

Indexing
- ISSN: 0742-2466

Links
- Journal homepage

The Florida Review is a national, non-profit literary journal published twice a year by the College of Arts and Humanities at the University of Central Florida.

The journal publishes poetry and prose written by emerging and established writers. They have published writers like David Foster Wallace, Tony Early, and Tom Chiarella before they went on to become regular contributors to The New Yorker, Harper's and The Atlantic.

The Florida Review was first published in 1972.

== Layout ==
The magazine has featured fiction, poetry, interviews, and essays by internationally renowned writers such as Margaret Atwood, William Trowbridge, Stephen Dixon, Philip Heldrich, Grace Paley, Lorrie Moore, Mark Doty, and Tobias Wolff. Florida writers are also represented, with a notable and diverse list including Sylvia Curbello, Bob Shacochis, Philip F. Deaver, Enid Shomer, Virgil Suárez and many others.

== Notable contributors ==
- Jacob Appel
- Alice Friman
- Steven Harvey
- Kathryn Kulpa
- Peter Selgin
- Lisa Stolley
- Mark Wisniewski

== Staff ==
The current staff includes:

- David James Poissant, Editor & Director and Fiction Editor
- Mike Shier, Managing Editor and Creative Nonfiction Editor
- Rochelle Hurt, Poetry Editor
- Nathan Holic, Graphic Narrative Editor
- Jordan Alexander, Rhys Petit, Drew Robertson, Senior Associate Editors
- Kianna Greene, Rose Leahy, Cesca Ledesma, Lisa Summe, Associate Poetry Editors
- Lorinda K. Antrim, Layout and Design
- Sean Ironman, David James Poissant, David Schwartz, Chapbook Staff

== See also ==
- Centric
- Central Florida Future
- List of literary magazines
