= Pegasus (mascot) =

Mascot of the University of Central Florida

Pegasus is the official academic logo, symbol and mascot of the University of Central Florida (UCF), a public research university with its main campus in unincorporated Orange County, Florida, United States.

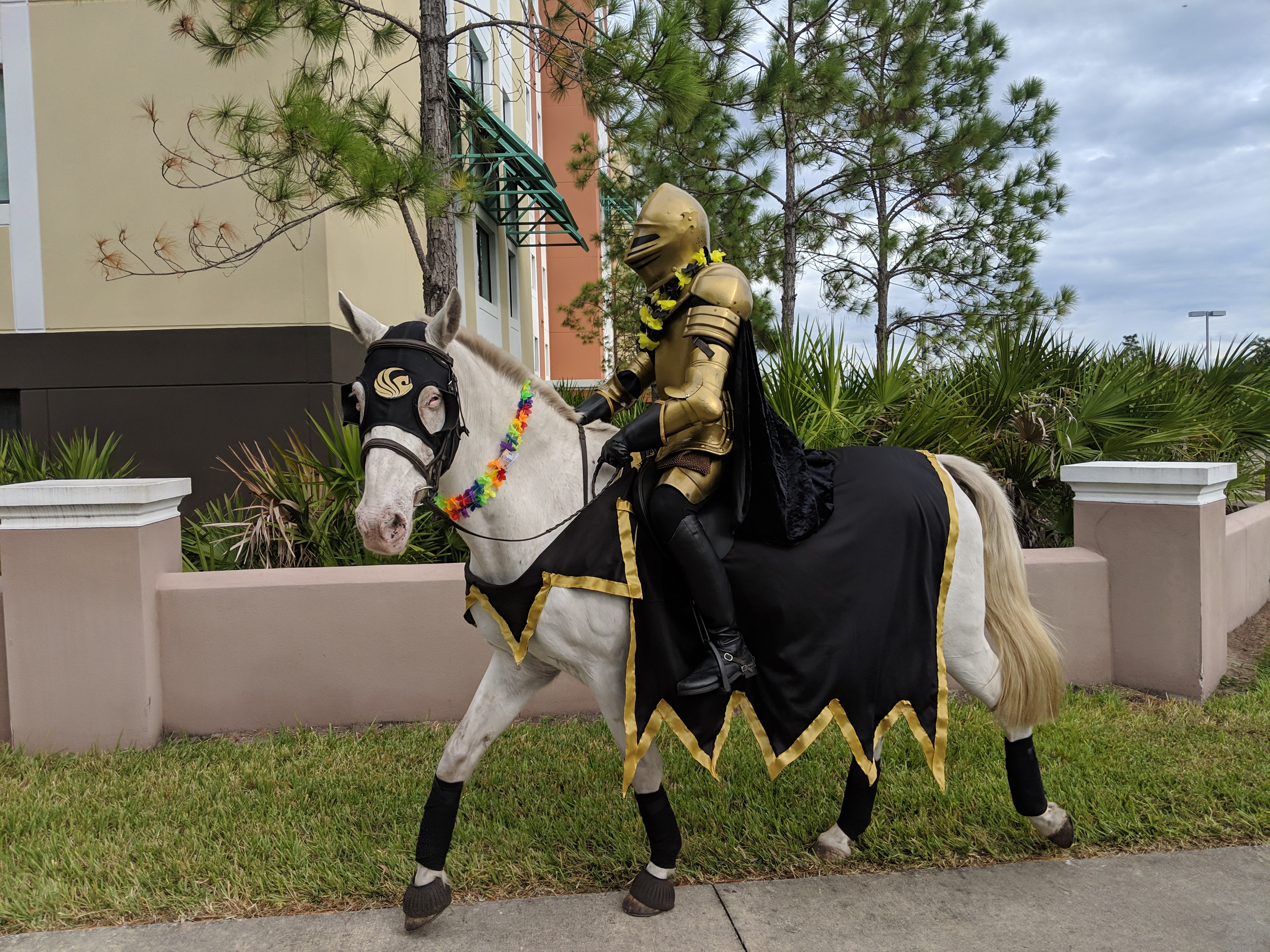
UCF Golden Knight and Pegasus

While the Pegasus is the logo and mascot of the university, Knightro is the mascot of university's athletic programs, the UCF Knights. The Pegasus logo is popular among students and the community, and UCF's equestrian club maintains a mascot program, which owns a "Pegasus" horse, a gray Andalusian stallion. Representing the "Pegasus," a horse that is regularly seen during home football games at the Bounce House; the Golden Knight, whose armor varies, generally rides atop the horse. The Pegasus and Knight are often seen representing other home sporting events and alumni events

== History ==
The University of Central Florida was founded in 1963 as the Florida Technological University. In 1968, UCF's first president, Dr. Charles N. Millican, and a citizen advisory group, designed the university's Pegasus seal. The logo and the school's first mascot was approved on April 5, 1968.

The Pegasus became the school's first athletic mascot in 1970, when UCF students voted and selected the "Knight of Pegasus" as their mascot over "Vincent the Vulture" which had been the university's unofficial mascot. Today, the Pegasus logo may be seen in the university's commercials and advertisements, and adorned on almost every building.

== Pegasus program ==
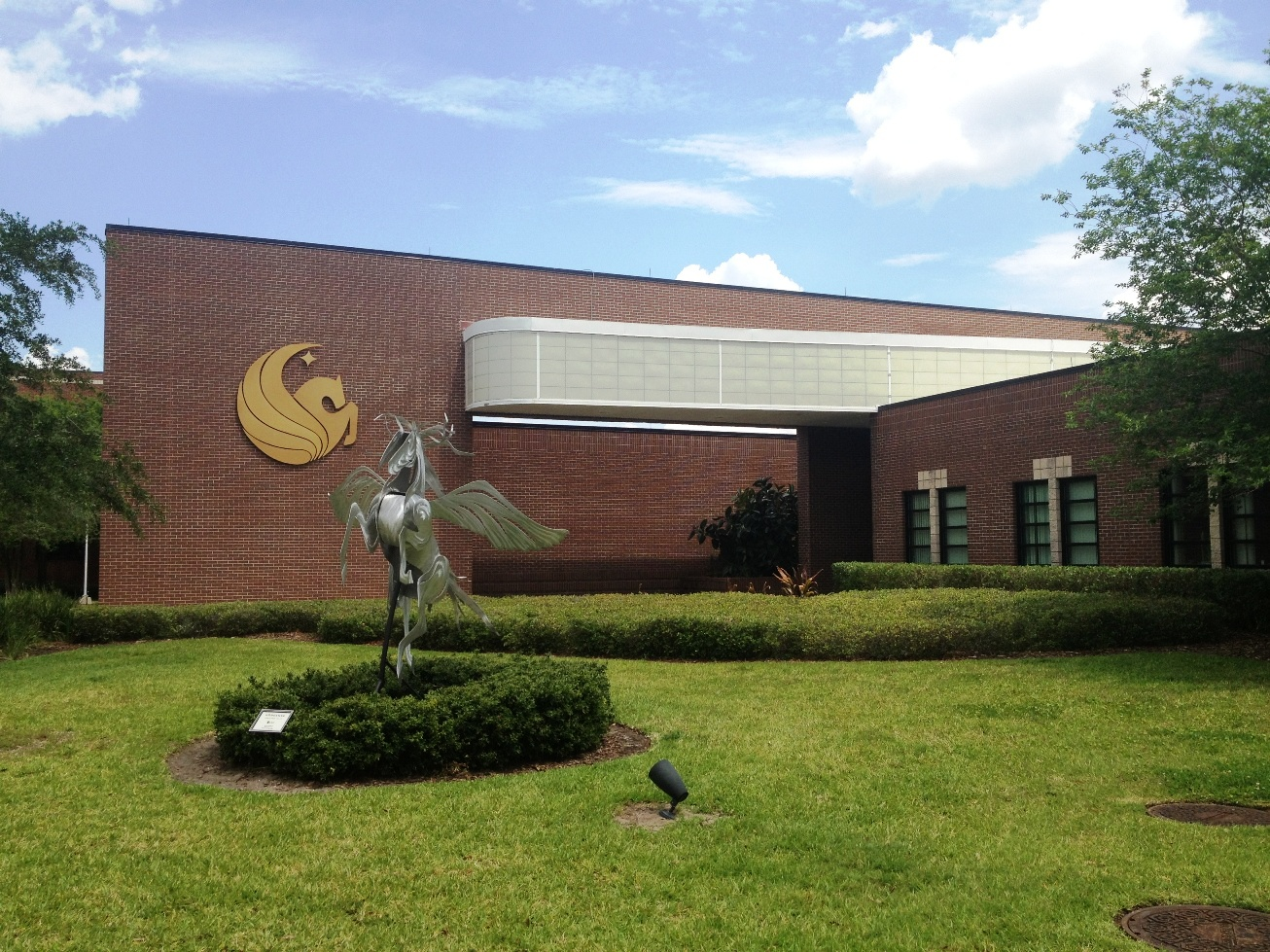
A Pegasus statue and logo, outside The Burnett Honors College

In 2001, the UCF Alma Mater Society established the Pegasus Mascot Program to provide both riders as well as horses for the role as Pegasus and the UCF Knight. Every fall semester students are eligible to submit applications to become the UCF Knight, but only the best riders at UCF are accepted. The creation of the Equestrian Club at UCF was due to the need for riders for Pegasus Mascot Program, and now every student trying out must be a member.

The program is entirely run by the students, with the guidance of the UCF Alumni Association. As well as the opportunity to try out to become the UCF Knight, students may choose to help at events, therefore become "squires". All squires must also be members of the Equestrian Club at UCF.

=== The horses ===
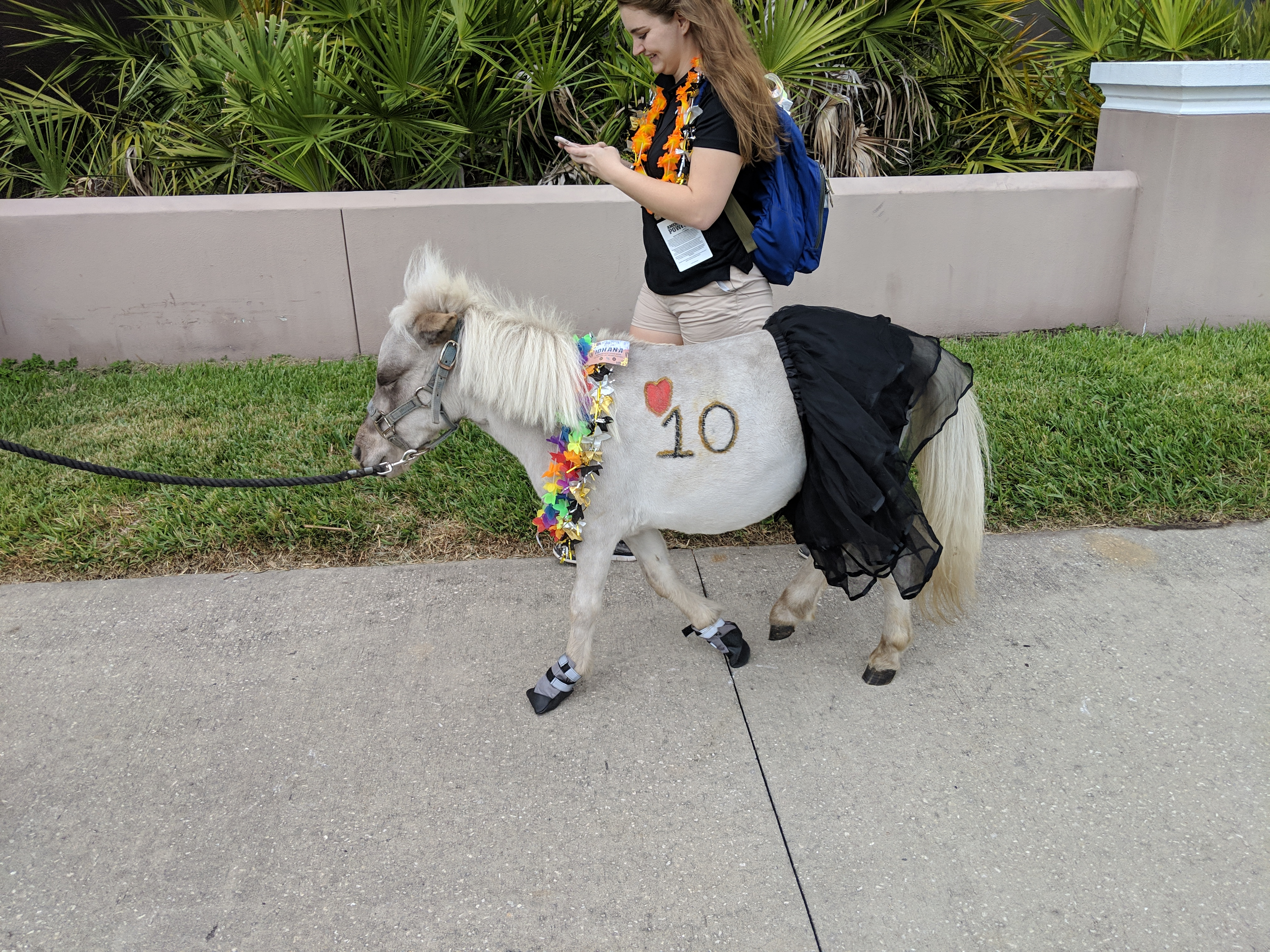
UCF's miniature horse Knugget

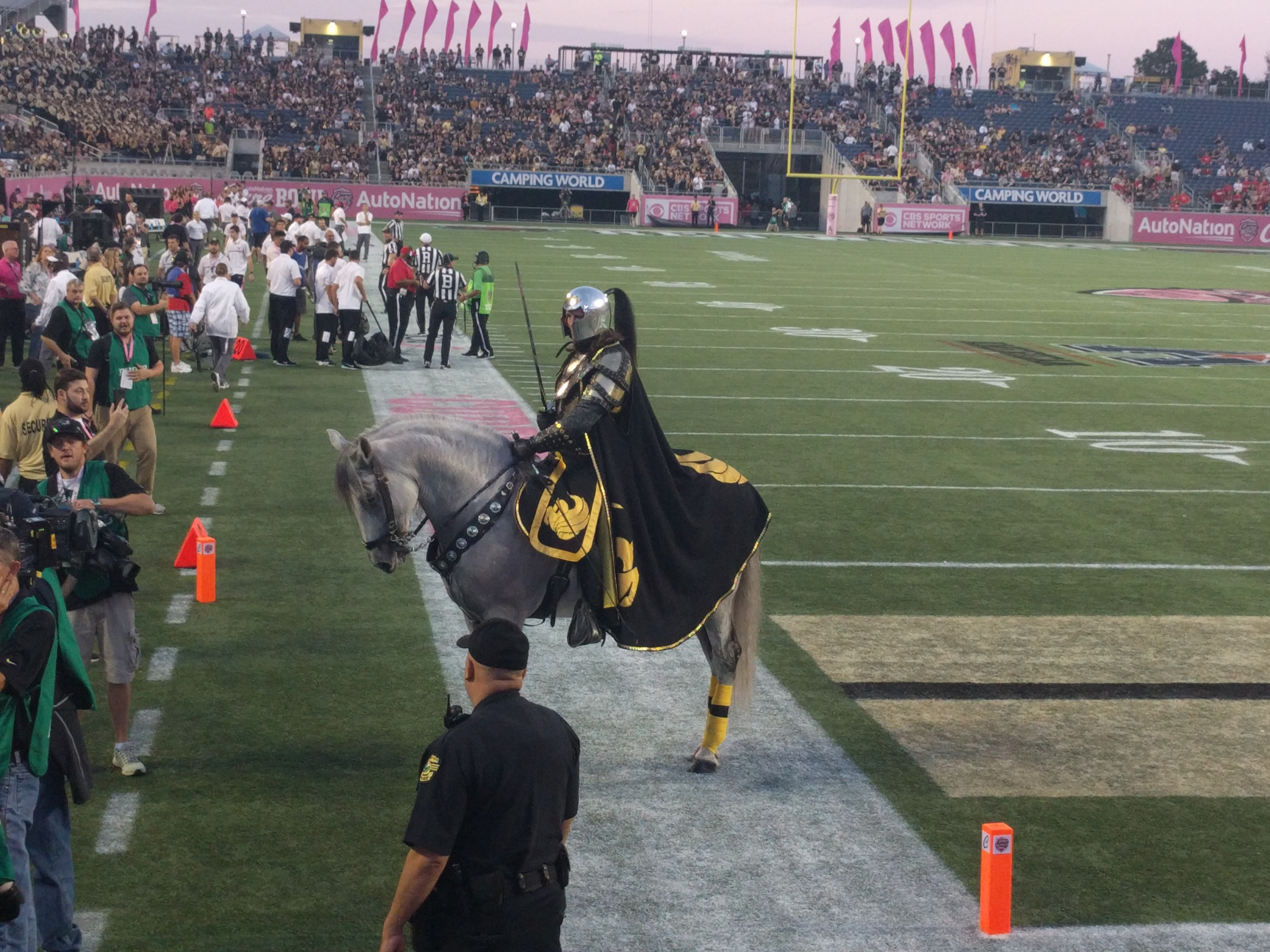
UCF Knight and Pegasus

The university has had an array of horses used as Pegasus during its history. Since the creation of the Pegasus Mascot Program in 2001, all horses used must be white. Horses have been donated by Burt Reynolds, UCF Board of Trustees member Rick Walsh and Medieval Times. In 2009, the famed touring show the "World Famous" Lipizzaner Stallions agreed to provide their horses for the program. The current Pegasus is a gray and white Andalusian stallion who used to be a solo horse on the tour. "Maluso" as he is known at the barn, has been trained in Classical dressage also known as haute ecole, made famous by the Spanish Riding School in Vienna, Austria. His signature move is his rear which he performs at every home football game. The pegasus horse also has a partner named "Knugget" the mini horse. The current Pegasus is also known for his tongue that he sticks out for his fans.

== See also ==
- Knightro
- UCF Knights
- History of the University of Central Florida
