= Terry Mohajir =

American athletic director

Current position
- Title: Athletic director
- Team: UCF
- Conference: Big 12

Biographical details
- Born: Overland Park, Kansas, U.S.

Playing career
- 1990–1991: Arkansas State

Coaching career (HC unless noted)
- 1993–1996: Kansas (ST/asst. OL)

Administrative career (AD unless noted)
- 1997–2004: University of Missouri-Kansas City (asst. AD for external relations)
- 2004–2011: Florida Atlantic (senior associate AD for external relations)
- 2011–2012: Kansas (senior associate AD and chief marketing officer)
- 2012–2021: Arkansas State
- 2021–present: UCF

Terry Mohajir is the current vice president and director of athletics at the University of Central Florida (UCF). He was formerly the athletic director at Arkansas State University. He is a former coach at the University of Kansas Jayhawks.

== College ==
Mohajir graduated from Arkansas State University in 1993 with a major in sports management and a minor in marketing. He also played on the Arkansas State football team for two seasons as a starting safety, jammer, and Upback on special teams.

== Coaching ==
Mohajir started working as an assistant with Arkansas State in 1992. He was hired at Kansas as an assistant coach for special teams and offensive line in 1993 under Glen Mason. In 1995 Kansas Jayhawks football team went 10-2, finished second in the Big 8 Conference, defeated UCLA in the 1995 Aloha Bowl, and was ranked ninth in the final Associated Press poll.

== Career ==
Mohajir was hired as the athletic director at the University of Central Florida on February 8, 2021. In his first full year at UCF in 2021, he hired Gus Malzahn as the new football head coach, whom he formerly worked with in 2012 at Arkansas State. UCF accepted an invitation from the Big 12 conference on September 10, 2021. Prior to starting play in the Big 12 in 2023–24, the university declared on June 9, 2022, that the upcoming season of 2022–23 would be its final season as an AAC member.

Prior to UCF, Mohajir was the Athletic Director and Vice Chancellor for Intercollegiate Athletics at Arkansas State. In his eight seasons with the Red Wolves, the football team participated in a bowl game each year and won four Sun Belt championships. In total, the Red Wolves won 25 conference championships across all sports under Mohajir. At Arkansas State, he upgraded athletic facilities worth around $90 million of enhancements. In 2020, he was named one of the top five non-Power Five conferences athletic directors by Stadium.

Mohajir previously served as assistant director of athletics for external relations at the University of Missouri-Kansas City. He was the senior associate director of athletics for external relations at Florida Atlantic University in 2004-11 and senior associate athletic director for external relations at the University of Kansas in 2011-12. At Florida Atlantic, he coordinated a fundraising effort for an on-campus football stadium that cost $70 million to build.
