= Todd Stansbury =

Canadian–American university sports administrator and former college athlete

Biographical details
- Born: April 18, 1961 (age 65); Oakville, Ontario, Canada

Playing career
- 1981–1984: Georgia Tech
- Position: Linebacker

Administrative career (AD unless noted)
- 1988–1995: Georgia Tech (assistant AD)
- 1997–2000: Houston (associate AD)
- 2000–2003: East Tennessee State
- 2003–2012: Oregon State (ex. assoc. AD)
- 2012–2015: UCF
- 2015–2016: Oregon State
- 2016–2022: Georgia Tech
- 2023–: NC State (deputy AD)

Todd Stansbury (born April 18, 1961) is a Canadian–American university sports administrator and former college athlete. Stansbury is the former athletic director for the Georgia Tech Yellow Jackets sports program at the Georgia Institute of Technology. He previously served as executive associate athletic director at Oregon State, assistant athletic director for academics at Georgia Tech, associate athletic director at the University of Houston, and athletic director at East Tennessee State University, the University of Central Florida, and the Georgia Institute of Technology.

== Early life and education ==
Stansbury was born in Oakville, Ontario, Canada. He accepted an athletic scholarship to attend the Georgia Tech in Atlanta, Georgia, where he lettered as a linebacker for coach Bill Curry's Yellow Jackets football team. He graduated from Georgia Tech with a B.S. in Industrial Management in 1984. Despite an injury plagued career at Georgia Tech, Stansbury was a third round draft choice for the Saskatchewan Roughriders. In 1993, he graduated with a masters in sports administration from Georgia State University.

== Early career ==
Todd Stansbury commenced his professional journey in collegiate athletics after a tenure within the banking sector. With an interest in finance and accounting, he initially pursued a career within banking, assuming the role of credit manager at Citizens and Southern National Bank in Atlanta.

However, the trajectory of his career shifted markedly in the autumn of 1987, catalyzed by an unexpected phone call from an unlikely source. The caller, Scott Zolke, his former academic advisor, presented an offer for Stansbury to assume his position as the academic advisor to the football team.

In 1988, Stansbury transitioned into the realm of sports, joining his alma mater, Georgia Tech, as an academic counselor for football. Over time, he rose in the organization, ultimately becoming the assistant athletic director for academics, wherein he continued to make substantive contributions toward the holistic development and success of student-athletes.

In 1995, Stansbury pursued his passion for travel and adventure by backpacking around the world with his wife Karen for almost 2 years. This experience would later play a significant role in his philosophy towards developing student athletes into leaders and providing them international opportunities as he developed and implemented programming that built upon his experience with Dr. Rice’s “Total Person Concept". While traveling he represented the Institute for International Sport helping build a network of schools to serve as a pipeline for students to participate in the World Scholar Athlete Games. His tenure abroad afforded him a broadened perspective and expanded appreciation of the power of sport to bring people together. In 1997, he came back to the United States to become the associate athletic director at the University of Houston.

== East Tennessee State University ==
Assuming the role as Director of Athletics at East Tennessee State University in July 2000, he spearheaded a comprehensive array of initiatives. Updating budget controls for coaches and staff, rebranding the department of athletics which included modernizing marks and logos, and orchestrating fundraising campaigns, and implementing academic support and personal development programming for student athletes. Under his stewardship, ETSU witnessed the initiation and execution of a program-wide strategic plan alongside extensive reorganization and significant staff recruitment which led to stabilizing a program with a history of high staff turnover. Notably, he oversaw the completion of numerous infrastructure and capital projects, including the establishment of a golf practice facility for its nationally ranked golf program, added the sport of softball, and expanded the athletic training facility into a revenue producing outpatient rehabilitation center in partnership with the ETSU College of Medicine.

== University of Central Florida ==
In January 2012, Todd Stansbury assumed the role of athletic director for the UCF Knights, serving as the executive vice president for the UCF Athletics Association, the private non-profit entity overseeing the administration and financial management of UCF's athletic programs while the program was in the middle of a major NCAA infractions investigation which ultimately led to NCAA probation with penalties. Under Stansbury's guidance, UCF navigated through the NCAA infractions process and the chaos of conference realignment that ultimately led to the demise of the Big East as a football playing conference and required UCF to transition from Conference USA to the Big East to becoming a founding member of the American Athletic Conference in 2013. Despite this uncertainty, UCF was able to lay the foundation for long term success ultimately leading to its move to the Big 12 conference.

Following the transition from Conference USA to the American Athletic Conference, the UCF Knights secured five titles in their inaugural year in the new league and nine in his last year which remains the most successful year UCF had athletically while a member of the AAC. Notably, among these championships was the football team’s remarkable 12-1 season in 2013, resulting in a historic No. 10 Associated Press final national ranking following their victory over Baylor in the Fiesta Bowl.

During his tenure at UCF, Stansbury's leadership drove student-athlete development through initiatives and capital projects, such Knights without Borders, the 1st Round Draft Choice corporate partnership program and the creation of the Student-Athlete Leadership Center. The First Round Draft Choice program stemmed from a gradual realization that regardless of industry, business leaders sought similar qualities in prospective employees. The program, designed to integrate student-athletes with some of the region's leading employers, aims to provide them with meaningful access to career opportunities.

His work on academic excellence resulted in record-breaking graduation success rates, while his fundraising endeavors led to improvements in athletic facilities and programs. Additionally, his initiative in creating new revenue streams led to UCF hosting Penn State in a home football game played in Dublin, Ireland, and the creation of a cutting-edge tennis facility for the UCF tennis programs at the UCF Tennis Center at the USTA National Campus in Lake Nona.

== Oregon State University ==
Stansbury held two distinct roles at Oregon State, serving initially as executive associate athletic director from 2003-2012 before returning in 2015 as director of athletics. With oversight of business operations, revenue generation, and sports supervision across 17 sports and 500+ student-athletes, Stansbury led strategic planning and reorganization efforts while overseeing a significant increase in fundraising activities. Under his guidance, marketing and ticket operations experienced an 80% growth in revenue during his tenure as Executive Associate AD, while licensing and merchandising also saw substantial increases. Using a similar playbook from his time at ETSU Stansbury also negotiated a partnership with Samaritan Health Systems to establish a state-of-the-art outpatient clinic within the athletic complex.

Speaking on Stansbury hire at Oregon State, OSU president Ed Ray said, “Todd is committed to high-level athletics achievement by competing and winning championships the right way – the Oregon State way. He is very skilled at growing fan excitement and engagement, and will guide the success of our student-athletes in sports, academics, and community.”

Additionally, Stansbury played a key role in managing $168 million in capital projects and fostering student-athlete development through initiatives like the "Everyday Champions Program" and the "Beavers without Borders" service program.

In 2019, Stansbury was sued by Oregon State for breach of contract, with Oregon State alleging that $1,471,888.78 (plus $41,374.19 in interest) was still owed by Stansbury as part of his buyout for leaving for Georgia Tech. The lawsuit was dropped in 2020 after Georgia Tech had agreed to loan Stansbury the outstanding buyout balance, which was paid to Oregon State by Stansbury, in exchange for lowering his salary at Georgia Tech.

== Georgia Institute of Technology (Georgia Tech) ==
In 2016 Todd Stansbury rejoined his alma mater as athletic director. At the time of his hire, Georgia Tech president Dr. G.P. “Bud” Peterson said, “Todd Stansbury is committed to athletes’ success both on and off the field. His global perspective and leadership experience in athletics and development, combined with a lifelong passion for Georgia Tech, make him the ideal candidate. I believe this is one of those rare golden moments in life where opportunity meets ambition. We welcome him home.”

Throughout his tenure, Stansbury spearheaded initiatives and capital projects, such as the $90 million Student-Athlete Sports Performance Center. His dedication to academic excellence is evidenced by achieving a 90% graduation success rate, the highest in the institution's history. Stansbury's commitment is evident in programs like GTAA Ventures and initiatives like JumpStart Jackets and Jackets Without Borders, offering practical advantages beyond athletics. Additionally, his leadership extended to forming partnerships, including arranging high-profile matchups at Mercedes-Benz Stadium and securing a multi-media rights partnership with Legends, boosting sponsorship revenue, expanding student access to entrepreneurial opportunities, and refining the program's branding and engagement strategies at Georgia Tech.

To advance his strategic objectives, Stansbury established two new offices within the athletics department: the Office of Brand and Ideation, dedicated to defining and promoting the Yellow Jackets' brand story, and the Office of Innovation, tasked with establishing Georgia Tech athletics as a leader in athletic innovation, fostering collaborations with the Institute and Atlanta's innovation hubs.

He also engaged notable former Georgia Tech student-athletes, such as his former teammate Sam Bracken, a New York Times best-selling author and executive coach, who contributed to cultivating a strong internal culture and setting strategic priorities.

Stansbury’s hiring of Geoff Collins was an unmitigated disaster for Georgia Tech, earning him the moniker “Toad Stansbury.” Incredibly, Stansbury did not include a clawback clause in Collins’s contract, a failure hard for many Georgia Tech fans to comprehend. In September 2022, Collins and Stansbury were fired.

== North Carolina State University (NC State) ==
Since assuming the role of deputy athletic director at NC State, Stansbury has continued to uphold his leadership philosophy, emphasizing the comprehensive development of student-athletes.

== Awards and Career Highlights ==
Stansbury's contributions to collegiate athletics have garnered widespread recognition and accolades, including:

- Inclusion in the Atlanta Business Chronicle’s "Most Admired CEOs" List (2021)
- Appointment to the College Football Playoff Selection Committee (2018 – 2021)
- Receipt of the National Association of Collegiate Athletics Directors (NACDA) Community Service Award
- Reception of the Atlantic Coast Conference (ACC) Gamechangers Award for the establishment of the International Student Service Program, "Jackets without Borders"
- Held the position of International Coordinator for the Institute for International Sport in 1995
- Traveled around the world for 16 months to promote the 1997 World Scholar-Athlete Games

== Personal life ==
Aside from his professional work, Stansbury's travels with his wife, Karen, have taken him across four continents and 30 countries, giving him a global outlook that influences his leadership style and empowers students to excel in diverse settings.
