= Centric Software =

California Software Company

- Centric Software's logo
- Type: Private
- Industry: Software Development
- Founded: 2004; 22 years ago
- Headquarters: Campbell, California, United States
- Website: https://www.centricsoftware.com/

Centric Software is a Silicon Valley–based software company headquartered in Campbell, California. The company provides product life-cycle management (PLM) and AI software globally, as well as planning, pricing and market intelligence, product information management, digital asset management, and e-commerce products.

== History ==
Centric Software was founded in 2004. The company began as a product lifecycle management vendor, developing configurable out-of-the-box products for the fashion industry, designed to support users without custom coding.

In 2010, Centric introduced its first mobile application, Capture it, which uploads images to the PLM system.

In 2013, the company developed The Adobe Connect tool, that allows designers to use Adobe Illustrator while staying integrated with the PLM system.

In 2017 Centric’s REST API launched, allowing integration between Centric PLM and external systems such as ERP and digital asset management. The same year, it launched an artificial intelligence powered PLM tool, AI Image Search.

In 2018, Centric began to add 3D connectors that integrate Centric PLM with applications including Browzwear, Optitex and CLO 3D.

In 2019, Centric launched PLM for original equipment manufacturer and original design manufacturer manufacturers.

Centric Software acquired retail planning provider, Armonica Retail in 2021. This was followed by the acquisition of market intelligence software company StyleSage in 2022 and the predictive pricing software provider aifora, in 2023. Most recently, it acquired both Contentserv and ShoppingFeed, a PIM and DAM platform.

Its parent company is Dassault Systèmes.

== Products ==
Centric PLM: Centric Software’s original PLM product, focused on design, development and sourcing for the consumer goods industry.

Centric Market Intelligence: is a platform for collecting and analyzing market data.

Centric Visual Boards: interactive visual pivot tables that combine data with 2D and/or 3D images.

Centric Planning & Pricing: cloud-based solution for planning, pricing and inventory optimization

Centric PXM: is an AI-powered experience management product that works with PIM, DAM, content syndication, and digital shelf analytics.

Centric DPP: uses product data to create and maintain Digital Product Passports.

== See also ==
- Dassault Systèmes
- Product life-cycle management (marketing)
