= Knightro =

UCF Athletics Mascot

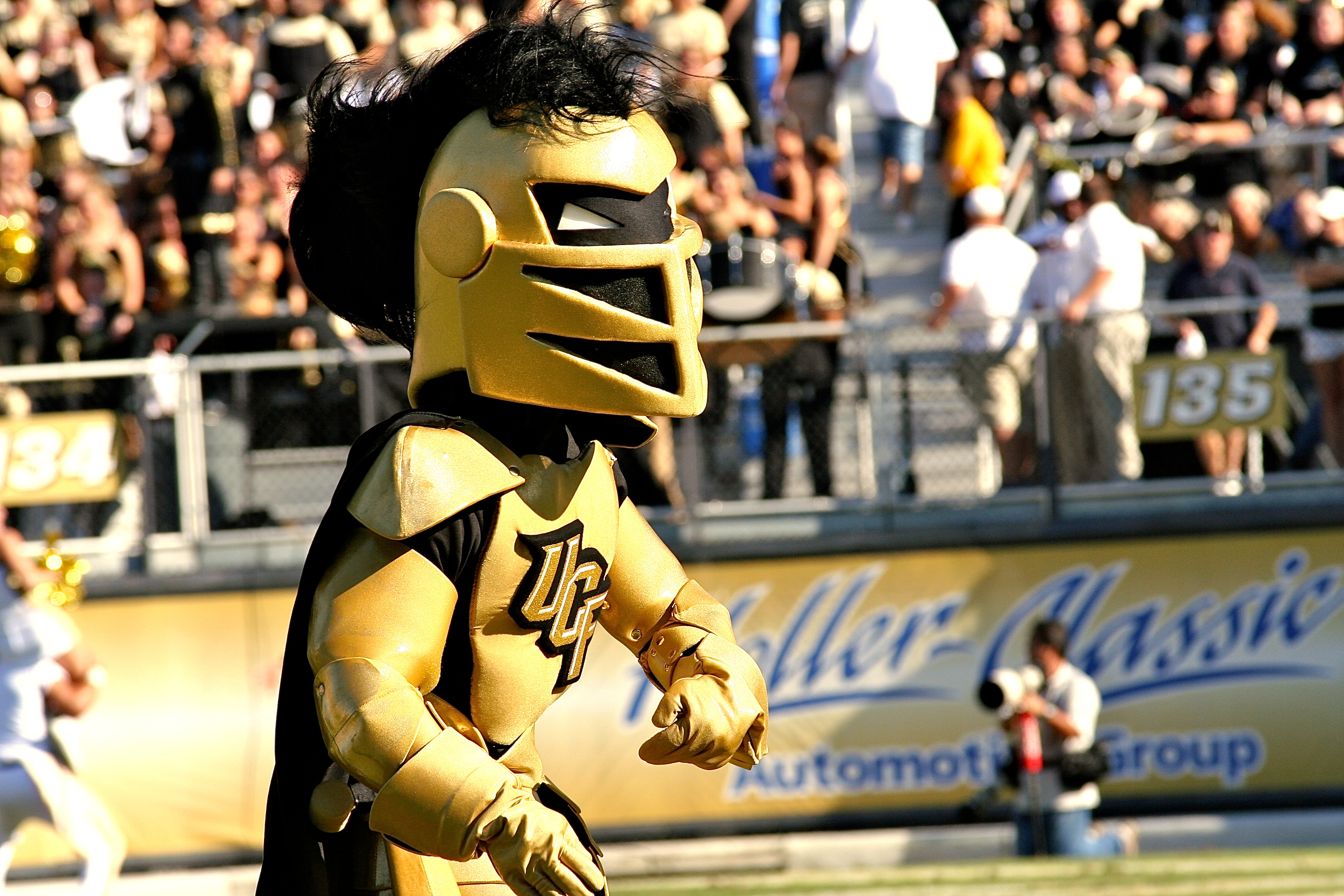
- Official Mascot of the University of Central Florida
- University: University of Central Florida
- Conference: Big 12
- Description: Knight
- First seen: October 21, 1994; 31 years ago
- Related mascot(s): Citronaut (retired), Glycerin (Girlfriend; retired)

Knightro is the official mascot of the University of Central Florida, and its sports teams, the Knights. Knightro debuted in 1994, and appears at UCF sporting events and also appears at UCF-related functions. He occasionally uses a custom go-kart designed and built by UCF Engineering students and other members of UCF Athletics, dubbed "Pegasus 1." He has previously used a custom car designed and built by UCF Engineering students dubbed "Chariot II."

== History ==
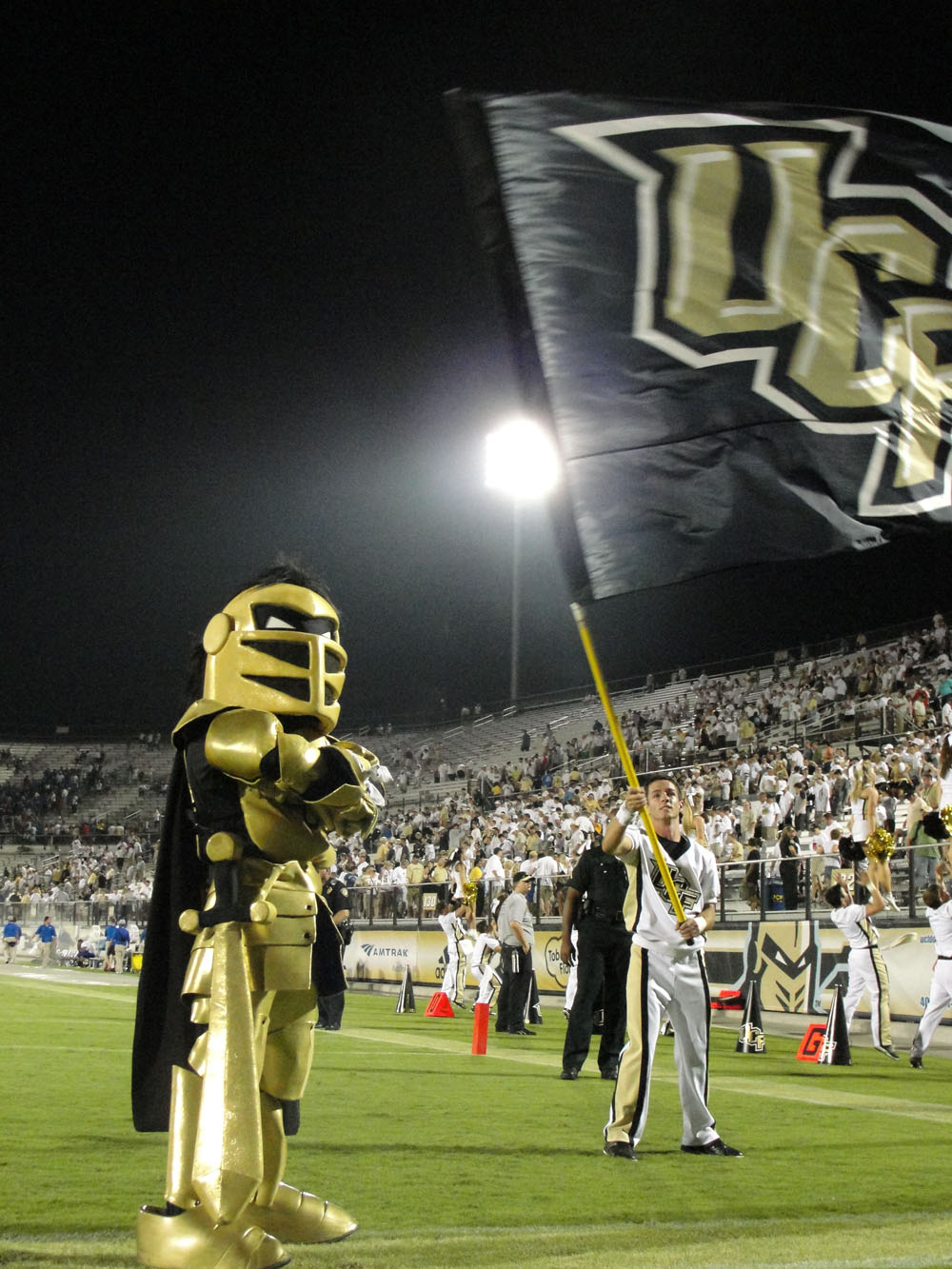
Knightro

Knightro UCF Logo, 2007–2021

In 1994 a committee was formed to explore and develop a character mascot that would attend athletics events. A number of drawings were submitted by Trey Gordon who was Fraternity Brothers with the student (Robert Morris) who named the new mascot ironically. With Linda Gooch, Gordon and SGA commissioned Metropolis Graphics to sketch a knight. Knightro's Name came from an election held by the Student Government and the winning submission was from Robert Morris (the Senate Pro Tempore at the time) with UCF's first mascot had been the Citronaut in 1969.

The first costume was made by Costume World, of Pompano Beach. Gordon filled the mascot position during that first season of 1994-95. At the start of the 1995-96 season, Trey recruited a freshman engineering student named Jay Lovelace to join him. Lovelace would fill the position of Knightro for four more years. In 1996, a new Knightro was created by a Disney character developer, and the female "Glycerin" was added. But after two years, the costumes had fallen apart.

In 1998, Dave Minichello, of Wizzards Production, created the molds for the third rendition of Knightro. In 2000, Glycerin was phased out and a glitter finish was added to Knightro's coat. In 2005-2006, a group of senior engineering students, as a part of their senior project, created a motorized car, called the Chariot II, for Knightro to use during the annual Homecoming Parade. Chariot II was also used during home football games and other occasions. In 2019 Knightro began using his go-kart, Pegasus 1, for many occasions on campus.

Today, Knightro is operated by the Team Knightro Mascot Squad, which consists of approximately 8 students who perform in costume at all football games, men's and women's basketball games, other athletic events, pep rallies, and special events and appearances. The head coach for Team Knightro is Michael "Mike" Callahan, a former member of Team Knightro.

The mascot was revised for the 2007 season, as part of the "Knights are Coming Home" campaign, where the athletics department dropped "Golden" from the team name, released new logos, and opened new on-campus venues (Bright House Networks Stadium and the new CFE Arena.) Knightro's look has been updated to closely resemble the new logo, this time with a fully enclosed helmet. The newest addition to Knightro includes his name spelled out on the back of his cape.

== Competitions ==
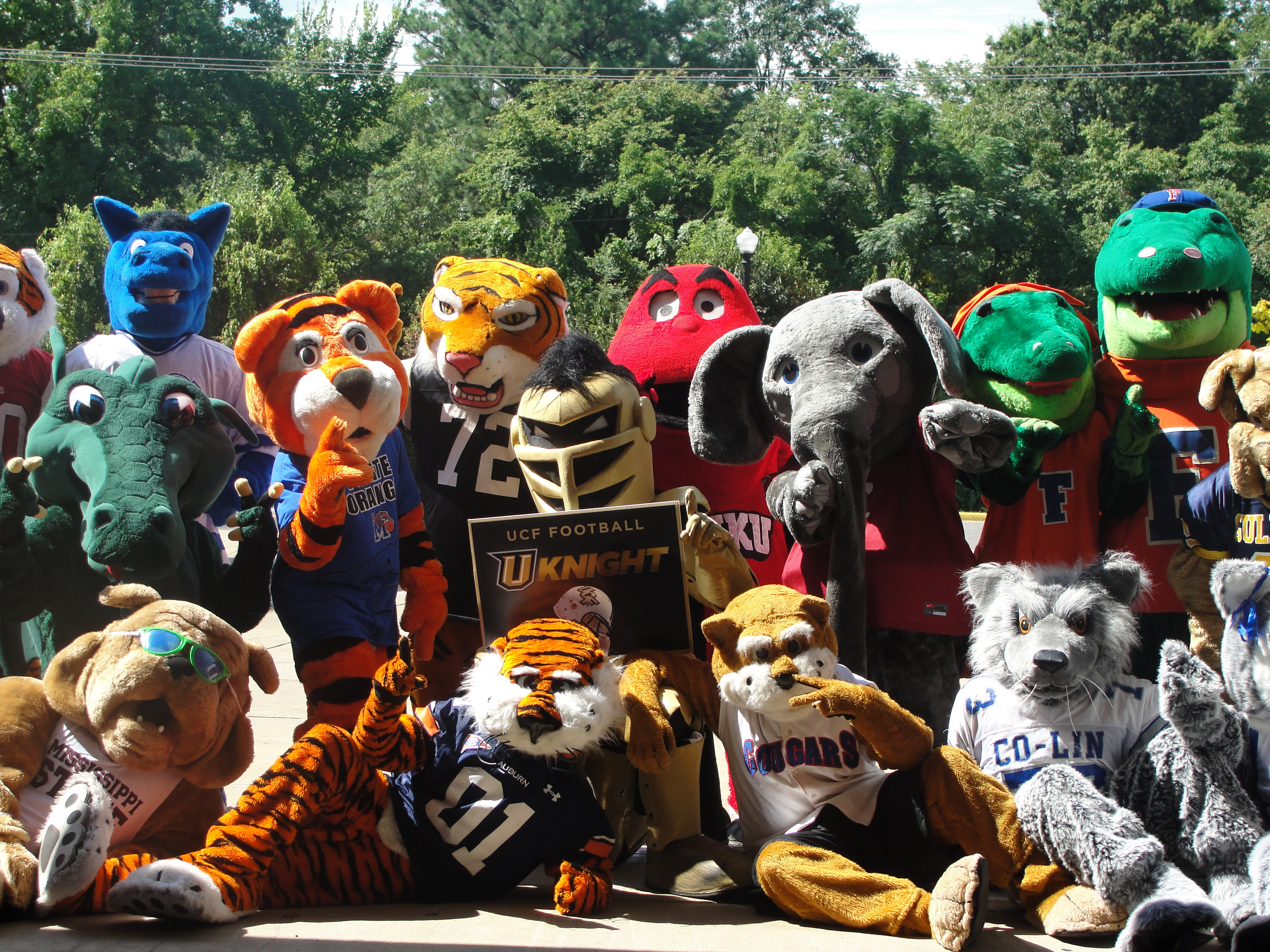
Knightro and friends UKNIGHT for UCF Football.

Knightro competed in the UCA Mascot National Championships for many years and was ranked numerous times. He placed in the following positions: 1994: 4th place, 1996: 6th place, 2003: 10th place, 2004: 10th place, 2008: 8th place, and 2011: 9th place.

Knightro also placed second in EA Sports' fan poll to select the mascot that would grace the cover of the Wii version of NCAA Football 09. EA Sports used the older version of Knightro for the poll and all related material, even though it was held exclusively in 2008, after Knightro's redesign.

== Community service ==
Knightro is a fan of community service and regularly can be seen helping out in the Orlando and UCF communities. As part of his community service, he regularly attends the Celebrity Mascot Games which are held in Orlando every year and benefit the New Hope For Kids charity. As part of competing for a national championship, Knightro routinely creates entry videos that demonstrate the impact he has in the UCF community.

== Training ==
Knightro trains throughout the summer and regularly during the school year so that he will always be ready to support the UCF community. During the Spring of every year, tryouts are held for the new members of Team Knightro.

== See also ==
- Pegasus
- UCF Knights
- University of Central Florida
