= UCF Knights =

Athletic program of the University of Central Florida

- University: University of Central Florida
- Nickname: Knights
- NCAA: Division I (FBS)
- Conference: Big 12 (primary); Sun Belt (Men's soccer)
- Athletic director: Terry Mohajir
- Location: Orlando, Florida
- Varsity teams: 16
- Football stadium: Acrisure Bounce House
- Basketball arena: Addition Financial Arena
- Ice hockey arena: Orlando Ice Den (club team)
- Baseball stadium: John Euliano Park
- Softball stadium: UCF Softball Complex
- Soccer stadium: UCF Soccer and Track Stadium
- Tennis venue: UCF Tennis Complex
- Other venues: UCF Cross Country Complex; UCF Intercollegiate Rowing Center; The Venue at UCF
- Colors: Black and gold
- Mascot: Knightro
- Fight song: Charge On
- Website: ucfknights.com

Big 12 logo in UCF colors

The UCF Knights are the athletic teams that represent the University of Central Florida in unincorporated Orange County, Florida near Orlando. The Knights participate in the National Collegiate Athletic Association's (NCAA) Division I (FBS for football) as a member of the Big 12 Conference. Since men's soccer is not sponsored by the Big 12, they play in the Sun Belt Conference.

The university has asked to be identified as UCF when being referenced as opposed to Central Florida, though they formerly asked to be identified as either. Television networks and other media outlets, most notably ESPN, were initially slow to adopt this policy, but had mostly adapted by 2017. The "Knights of Pegasus" – as the nickname was originally called – was a submission put forth by students, staff, and faculty in 1970 who wished to replace UCF's unpopular original mascot, the Citronaut, which was a mix between an orange and an astronaut. In 1993 through 2007, the teams were rebranded and known as the Golden Knights. The Knights were also chosen over the Vultures ("Vincent the Vulture" which was a popular unofficial mascot among students at the time). In 1994, Knightro debuted as the Golden Knights' official athletic mascot. Since 2014, the Citronaut has made a limited return for some "throwback" games in football.

UCF sponsors 16 varsity sports: 6 for men (baseball, basketball, football, golf, soccer, and tennis; the minimum number of men's sports required for a Division I school) and 10 for women (basketball, cross country, golf, rowing, soccer, softball, tennis, indoor track & field, outdoor track & field, and volleyball). UCF also used to sponsor a men's wrestling team, but it was discontinued after the 1986 season.

The Knights 16 varsity teams have combined to win 89 conference championships and two national championships as of the end of the 2020–21 school year. Neither of the national championships were bestowed by the NCAA, making them one of just three power conference members to never win an NCAA national championship. (Note: The women's volleyball team won in the AIAW Small College Division (equivalent to NCAA Division II) national title in 1978 and the football team was selected as national champions by the Colley Matrix in 2017. Neither of these titles came in NCAA sanctioned events as the NCAA does not award national championships in FBS Football and did not sponsor women's sports at all before 1982.) (Note: Alongside Virginia Tech Hokies and Kansas State Wildcats) One Golden Knights athlete, Aurieyall Scott, has won an individual NCAA championship. Scott won the 60 meter dash at the 2013 NCAA Indoor Track and Field Championship. The non-varsity UCF cheerleading team has captured three national titles at the College Cheerleading and Dance Team Nationals.

Athletic facilities on the campus include the 46,000-seat Acrisure Bounce House, the 10,000–seat Addition Financial Arena, 3,000–seat Venue, John Euliano Park, the UCF Soccer and Track Stadium, and the UCF Softball Complex.

UCF was invited to join the Big 12 Conference on September 10, 2021, and accepted the invitation later that day. UCF began conference play in the Big 12 for the 2023 season.

== History ==
=== Conference affiliations ===
FTU Knights logo, ca. 1978

The UCF varsity athletic program was a charter member of the Sunshine State Conference in 1975. The school moved up to Division I in 1984. In its first years in D-I, UCF was a member of the American South Conference, merging into the Sun Belt Conference in 1991. Women's sports in Division I played in the New South Women's Athletic Conference until 1990, when the American South began organizing women's sports. In 1992, UCF joined the Trans America Athletic Conference (TAAC) in all D-I sports except football, which remained independent.

In 1996, UCF was advanced to I-A (FBS) in football, and initially remained independent in football until becoming a football-only member of the Mid-American Conference in 2001, the same year the TAAC became the Atlantic Sun Conference (which rebranded itself as the ASUN Conference in 2016). UCF joined Conference USA (C-USA) in all sports in 2005. It was announced in 2011 that UCF would join the Big East, which became the American Athletic Conference (AAC) in 2013 following conference realignment and is now known as the American conference. UCF started playing in the AAC in 2013.

In September 2021, UCF received and accepted a membership offer to the Big 12 Conference. They became members of the Big 12 on July 1, 2023.

=== Mascot ===
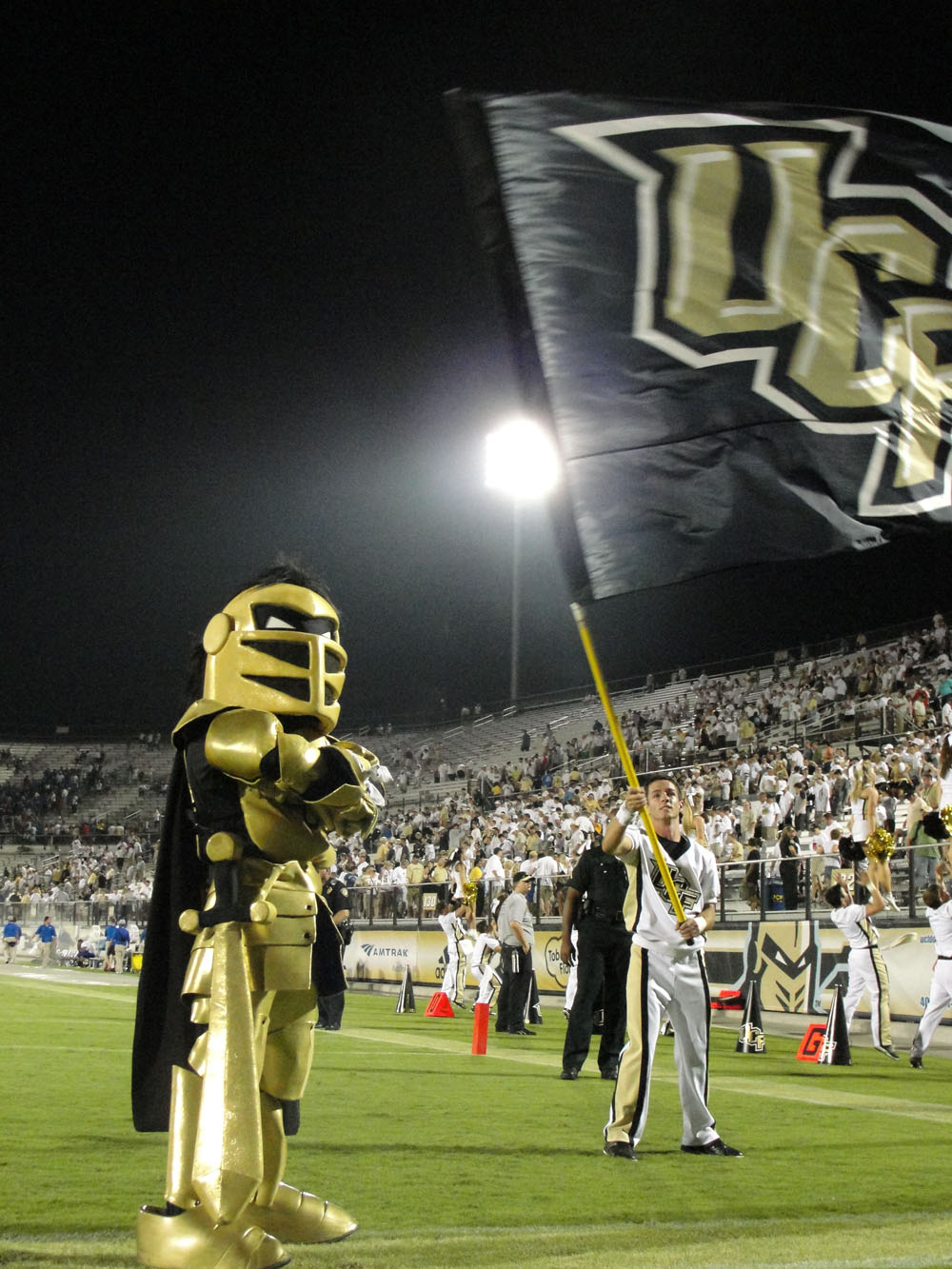
Knightro, UCF's mascot

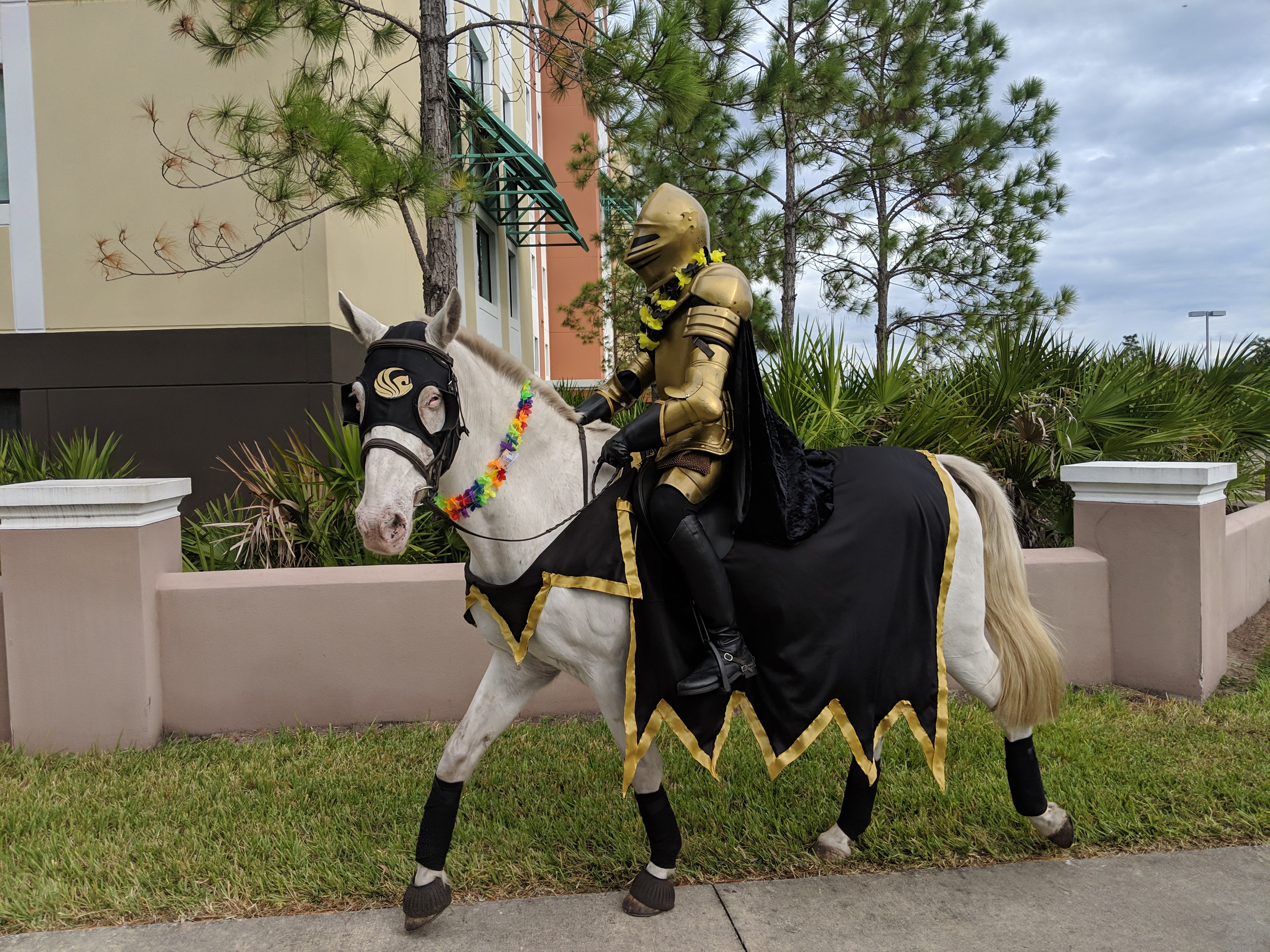
Pegasus the Horse in 2018, wearing leis for McKenzie Milton

The university's first mascot was the Citronaut, which was designed by Norman Van Meter, the brother-in-law of FTU's then-president Charles N. Millican. The Citronaut made an official appearance on a university publication, the cover of the 1968–69 student handbook.

The sports teams were originally known as the "Knights of the Pegasus" – UCF's first official mascot – beginning with their first intercollegiate competitions in 1970. The moniker was switched to "Golden Knights" in 1993 as a solution to poor merchandise sales. In 2007, UCF announced that they would be dropping “Golden,” and would be known as the “Knights.” The mascot of the athletic teams is Knightro, a black knight with golden armor.

=== Facilities ===
In 2007, UCF made major changes to its athletic program. A new "athletic village" on the north end of campus known as Knights Plaza was developed. It included new sports facilities such as the new UCF Arena (later CFE Arena and now Addition Financial Arena) connected to the existing Venue at UCF and a new 45,000-seat football stadium originally known as Bright House Networks Stadium, later as Spectrum Stadium and the stadium's nickname of Bounce House, and now as FBC Mortgage Stadium, a new softball complex, and the first Division I indoor football practice facility in the state. This made UCF the first school to ever open a new football stadium and basketball arena at the same time, for the 2007–08 season. The athletic village also includes the already existing Jay Bergman Field and UCF Soccer and Track Stadium. The area was built in a downtown style with four towers of student housing including approximately 1000 beds, retail and restaurant areas, and a new pedestrian mall connecting the front of the new arena to the student union, known as Memory Mall. To mark the start of the new era, the teams names were reverted to "Knights" from the "Golden Knights" on May 4, 2007. In addition, new logos and uniforms were unveiled for all of UCF's athletic programs.

== Sports sponsored ==
Men's sports	Women's sports
Baseball	Basketball
Basketball	Cross country
Football	Golf
Golf	Rowing
Soccer	Soccer
Tennis	Softball
	Tennis
	Track and field^{1}
	Volleyball
^{1} – includes both indoor and outdoor

=== Basketball ===
==== Men's basketball ====
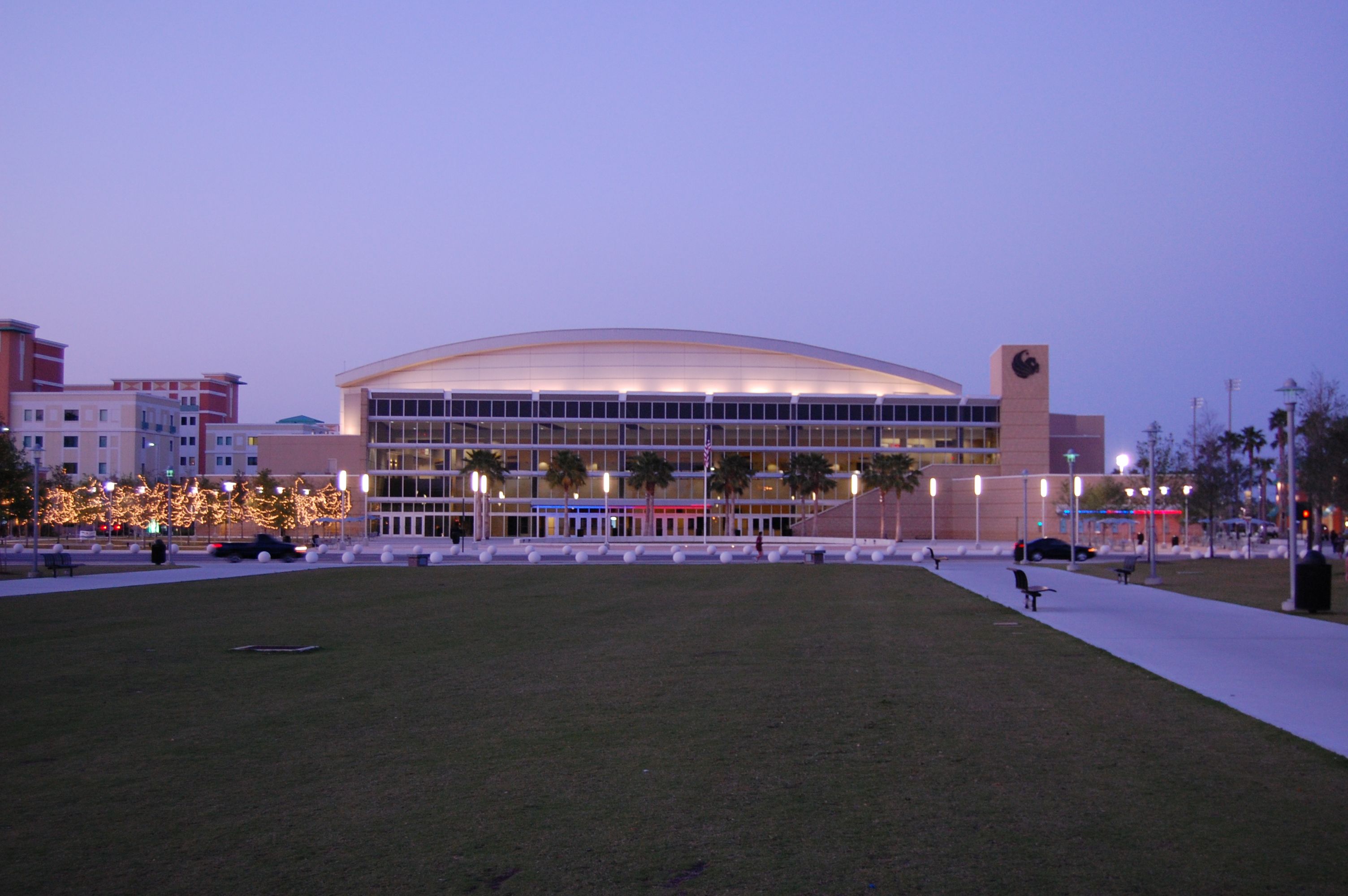
Addition Financial Arena, home of the UCF basketball teams

UCF played its first intercollegiate basketball game before the team even had a nickname. In the Division II era, under Torchy Clark, UCF found great success including a DII Final Four appearance.

UCF has been a member of Division I since 1985, and has advanced to the NCAA tournament 5 times (1994, 1996, 2004, 2005, 2019) 4 under coach Kirk Speraw and once under current coach Johnny Dawkins. UCF competed in the Atlantic Sun Conference (formerly called the Trans America Athletic Conference and now the ASUN Conference) from 1992 until 2005 when all sports joined C-USA, and plays in Addition Financial Arena. UCF made their debut in the C-USA Championship Tournament in the 2006 season, falling to Houston in the second round and closing out the season with the program's first losing record (14–15) since 2000–01. The Knights made a huge turnaround in the 2006–07 season, finishing 2nd in conference play to Memphis with an overall record of 22–9.

The UCF men's basketball team played its first exhibition game in the 9,400-seat UCF Arena (now Addition Financial Arena), with an 86–78 win over the Saint Leo Lions, on November 3, 2007. Their first regular-season game in the venue was a 63–60 victory over the Nevada Wolf Pack on November 11. Their first home C-USA game was against the Tulsa Golden Hurricane on January 11, 2008. The game was won by the Knights in triple overtime. On December 1, 2010, the Knights upset the #16 Florida Gators 57–54 at the new Amway Center in downtown Orlando, giving the Knights their first victory over a top 20 opponent as well as their first victory over the Gators. Following a 10–0 start to the 2010–11 season, the Knights were nationally ranked for the first time in program history. At the time, UCF was one of nine unbeaten teams, and one of only four schools to be ranked in the BCS standings and the AP men's basketball poll. In 2019, the Knights defeated the number 8 ranked Houston Cougars and ended the nations longest home winning streak at 33. With this win, they entered the AP poll for the first time since the 2010–2011 season; peaking at number 19 in the country. At the end of the season, they were selected for the NCAA Tournament as a number 9 seed. In the first round, they defeated 8 seed VCU with a score of 73–58. In the second round, they faced number 1 seed Duke. They came a layup away from pulling off the upset win with a score of 76–77. Despite the heartbreaking loss, the game is seen as one of the most important games in UCF athletics history.

==== Women's basketball ====
UCF first joined the AIAW for women's basketball in 1977–78. To conclude the 1979–80 season, the team won the Division-II Florida State Championship, before falling in their first game of the national tournament. They were promoted to AIAW Division I in its last year of existence, 1981–82, and made it to that year's District I tournament quarterfinals, before joining the NCAA in 1982–83.

The women's basketball team have made the NCAA Division I tournament in 1996, 1999, 2009, 2011, 2019, 2021, and 2022. They won the TAAC/Atlantic Sun regular-season title in 1999, 2003 and 2005, before joining C-USA. In 2009, UCF's women's basketball team shocked the C-USA by going 11–5 in conference play after going 2–11 in non-conference games and 10–20 the previous year, and swept through the 2009 Conference USA women's basketball tournament, dominating Southern Miss in overtime to win the championship game, 65–54, and earn its third Division I tournament appearance. In 2022, the Knights won the AAC title; going 14–1 in the conference and 26–3 overall. This earned them a number 24 overall final season ranking in the AP and coaches poll, as well as an automatic bid into the NCAA Tournament as a 7-seed. They defeated the 10-seed Florida Gators in the first round, and lost in the second round to 2-seed UConn by 5 points.

=== Baseball ===
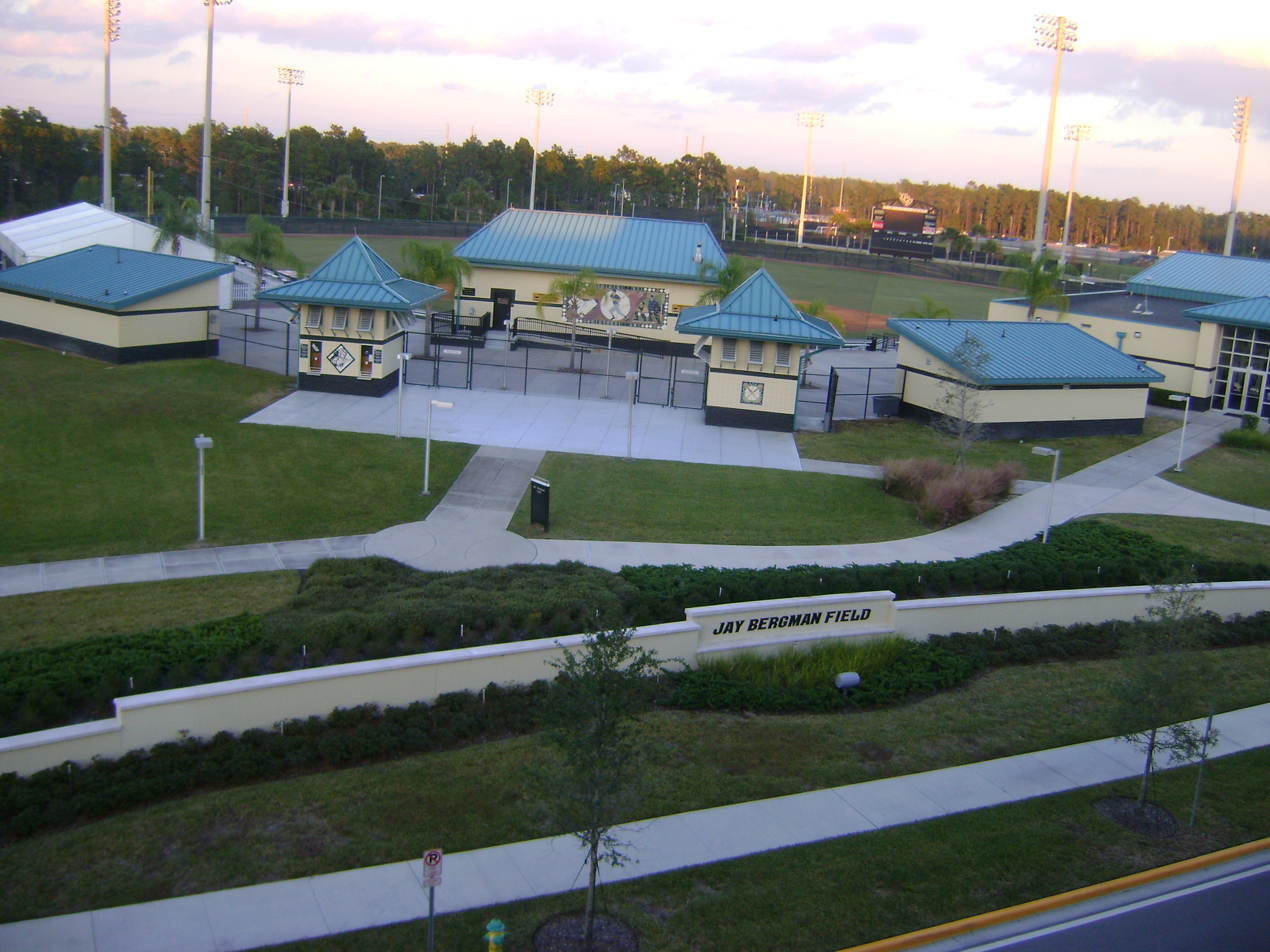
John Euliano Park, opened February 3, 2001

The baseball team is led by head coach Rich Wallace, who will enter his first season as head coach in 2024 for UCF's inaugural season in the Big 12. Prior to the hiring of Wallace, Greg Lovelady had headed the Knights since 2016.

The Knights only made one NCAA championship appearance under Lovelady's leadership that came in his first season in 2017, but did have winning records in every season under him and a shared AAC title with the Houston Cougars (also in 2017). Jay Bergman had been head coach since 1976 but was fired on May 1, 2008, after allegations arose of sexual harassment towards a male equipment coach.

Bergman had a large amount of success in this position, leading UCF to eight Atlantic Sun Championships and nine NCAA Regional Appearances, and brought UCF to a national ranking of #8 in 2001. In honor of his long-term success with the Knights, on February 3, 2001, UCF opened and dedicated Jay Bergman Field, which has since been renamed to John Euliano Park.

=== Football ===
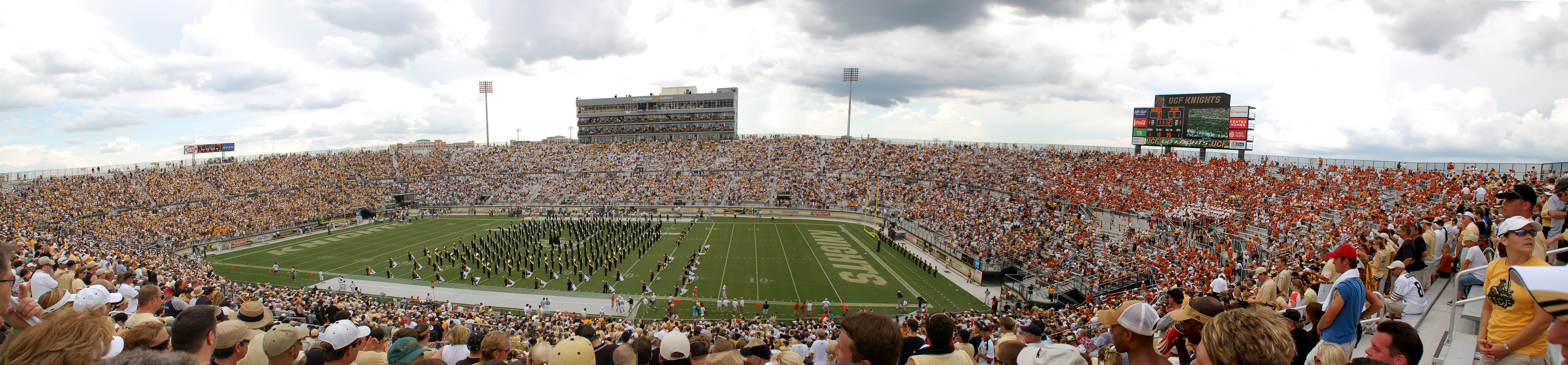
FBC Mortgage Stadium during its inaugural game against the University of Texas in September 2007

UCF fielded an official varsity football team for the first time in 1979, under head coach Don Jonas. Since then, the Knights have played in six bowl games, won six conference championships, produced 2 All-Americans, and two first-round draft picks. UCF has had some measure of success in football in its short NCAA history. It is the alma mater for NFL stars Brandon Marshall, Daunte Culpepper, Asante Samuel, Leger Douzable, and Bruce Miller among others. While UCF football can be traced back to its days as an NCAA Division III team under Jonas, it quickly moved up to Division II in 1982, and Division I-AA in 1990, finally matching the rest of its sports programs. In 1996, the program made its final ascension into Division I-A, now known as the Football Bowl Subdivision (FBS) of the National Collegiate Athletic Association (NCAA). UCF football plays as a member of the Big 12, where it has been a member since the 2023 season. The Knights play their home games at FBC Mortgage Stadium, the team's home field since 2007.

The Knights' most prominent historical football rivals are conference foes East Carolina and Tulsa, and former Conference USA rival Marshall. UCF's current main rival is in-state conference foe South Florida. For the beginning of the rivalry's existence, it was an inter-conference contest when South Florida was in the Big East and UCF in C-USA. Both schools are now members of the American Athletic Conference and play on Black Friday each year.

Since beginning play in 1979, the Knights have won three conference championships and four conference division titles. UCF won the C-USA East Division in 2005, 2007, 2010 and 2012, winning the conference championship game in 2007 and 2010. The Knights were also champions of The American in 2013. Before ascending to the FBS, UCF was a leading program in Division I-AA in the early 1990s. In 1990, UCF became the first school in history to qualify for the I-AA playoffs in its first season of eligibility. The Knights once again made the postseason in 1993, and were selected as the preseason No. 1 to start the 1994 season.

George O'Leary became UCF's head football coach in 2004 and had great success. The 2005 team won the school's first division championship, and earned their first trip to a bowl game, in the Knights first season in C-USA. In 2007, the Knights won their second division championship, and earned their first conference championship. During the 2009 campaign, UCF earned its first victory over a ranked opponent and third bowl appearance under O'Leary's watch. In 2010 they earned their first top 25 ranking, second conference championship, and won their first bowl game. In 2013, UCF went undefeated in conference play to win The American's conference championship in its inaugural season, earning the conference's automatic berth to a BCS game. The fifteenth-ranked Knights upset the sixth-ranked Baylor Bears 52–42 in the 2014 Fiesta Bowl to secure the program's first win a major bowl game, and pull off one of the biggest upsets of the BCS era. UCF finished the 2013 campaign by earning the program's first top-ten ranking, and with quarterback Blake Bortles being selected third overall by the Jacksonville Jaguars in the 2014 NFL draft. Scott Frost became the head coach in 2016 as O'Leary effectively resigned from the program midway through the season in 2015.

UCF defeated #7 Auburn 34–27 in the 2018 Peach Bowl on January 1, 2018, to secure the school's second major bowl victory. Citing the only undefeated season in the FBS, UCF administrators claimed a national championship football season on January 7 (the day before the College Football Playoff National Championship Game). The Colley Matrix, an NCAA-recognized selector, selected UCF as the top team in the country on January 9. It was the only selector to do so, as all other recognized selectors chose the winner of the College Football Playoff National Championship, the University of Alabama. The NCAA record book places UCF under the "Final National Poll Leaders" section, but since the beginning of the BCS era in 1998 has reserved the term "National Champions" for winners of the BCS, College Football Playoff, AP Poll, or Coaches Poll. UCF is the only team which actively claims a national championship that was not awarded by one of these polls since the beginning of the BCS era.

The decision to claim the championship earned the school exuberant praise from some national media outlets, but has been criticized by others.

=== Golf ===
The men's golf team was formed in 1979, and has appeared in NCAA Regionals 12 times, and have played in for the NCAA Championship four times. The last time the squad reached the championship was in 2009. The 2010 men's golf team were C-USA champions. The women's golf team was founded in 1982, and has made 9 NCAA Regional appearances, and has played for two NCAA Championship in 1996 and 2018.

Bryce Wallor is the head coach for the men's golf team, and Courtney Trimble is the head coach for the women's team. The Knights men's golf team plays its home matches at the Rio Pinar Country Club. The Knights women's golf team plays its home matches at the RedTail Golf Course. The Knight's golf teams practice at the UCF Golf Practice Facility, located near the UCF campus at the Twin Rivers Golf Club in Oviedo.

Numerous former Knight golfers have represented the UCF on the PGA and LPGA Tours, including Robert Damron and Cliff Kresge.

=== Women's rowing ===
The women's rowing team was formed in 1995. They have won 5 American Athletic Conference (AAC) Rowing championships, and have appeared in 6 NCAA Championships. The team matched their highest placement (18th overall) in their most recent 2019 appearance. This included their highest ever boat placement with the Varsity 4 boat coming in 14th. The team sit with UCONN Women's Basketball and USF Women's Soccer as the only sports in the AAC to win 5 consecutive conference championships. The 2020 season begun briefly with a sweep at the metro cup regatta, but was ended early due to COVID-19.

The Coaching team consists of Head Coach Becky Cramer and includes Assistant Coaches Rachel Klunder (Director of Operations), Mari Sundbo, and Montia Rice.

=== Soccer ===
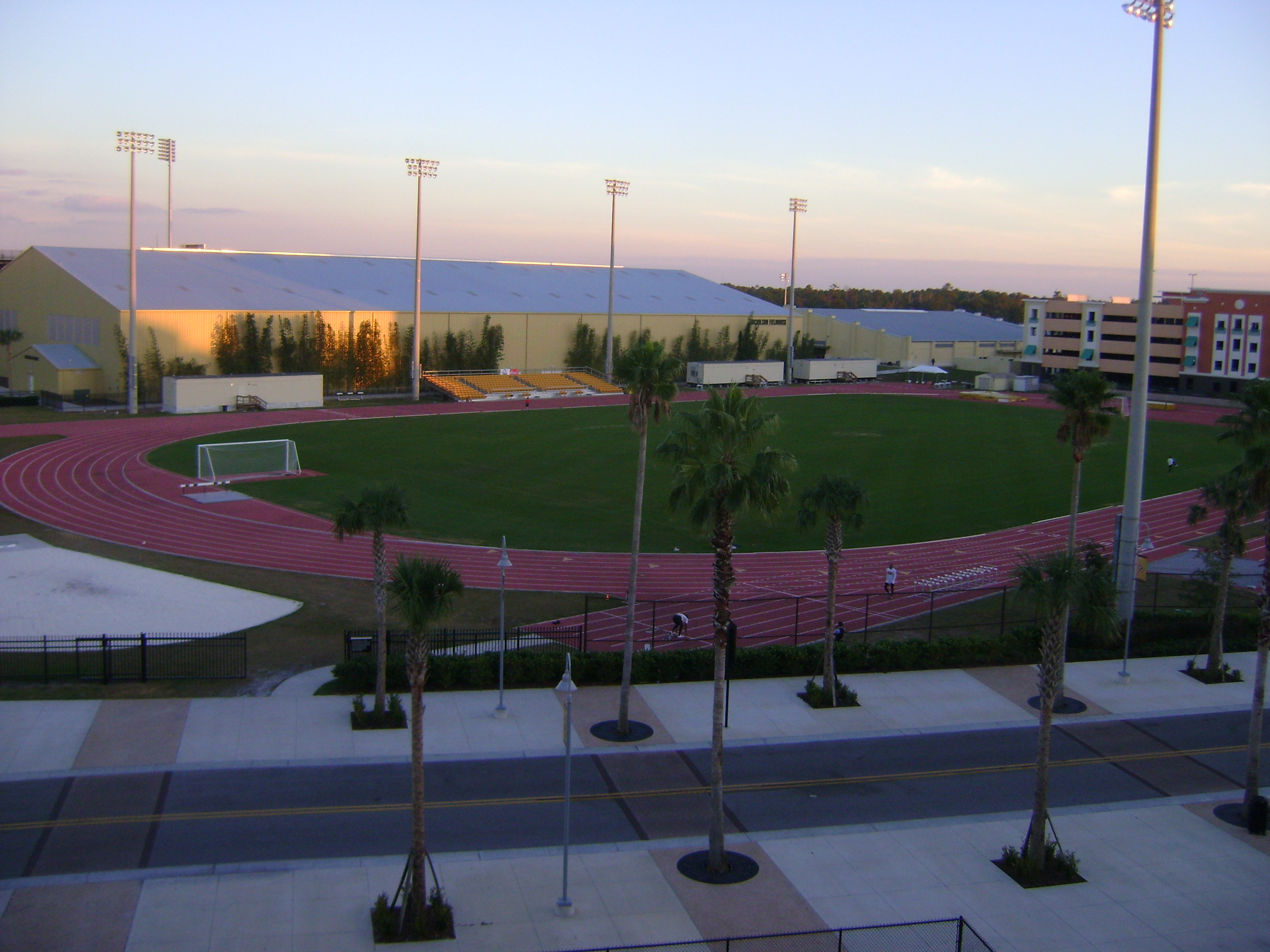
UCF Soccer and Track Stadium

UCF has produced a number of women's soccer stars. Most notably, Michelle Akers and Kim Wyant. Akers and Wyant were founding players on the United States women's national soccer team from 1985 to 2000. Akers helped them win the FIFA Women's World Cup in 1991 and 1999, and the 1996 Summer Olympics. Her career was so distinguished that Pelé named her among only two female players (along with fellow American Mia Hamm) on the FIFA 100 list of the greatest living soccer players in 2004.

The women's program made the final of the first ever official women's intercollegiate soccer championship in 1981, as well as the first NCAA Division I Women's Soccer Championship in 1982, losing the final in each year by the identical score of 1–0 to North Carolina.

The men's program has developed midfielder Eric Vasquez, who made his professional soccer debut with the Columbus Crew Major League Soccer. Vasquez later played for Miami FC in the United Soccer Leagues' First Division and the Orlando Sharks of the Major Indoor Soccer League before retiring due to injury. As well, former Knights Goalkeeper Ryan McIntosh initially signed a development deal with D.C. United of MLS. After a year with the D.C. United Reserve team, McIntosh signed with the Atlanta Silverbacks of USL Division One, where he led the team to the league final. The Silverbacks ended up losing to the Seattle Sounders. Both players were a part of the 2004 Central Florida Kraze amateur soccer team that won the Premier Development League's championship by defeating the Boulder Rapids Reserves, 1–0 at the UCF soccer stadium.

Former UCF goalkeeper Sean Johnson joined the Chicago Fire of Major League Soccer in 2010. He made his pro debut on August 1 and defeated the LA Galaxy. He was a member of the United States U-20 men's national soccer team which qualified for the 2009 FIFA U-20 World Cup in Egypt. On the women's team, Aline Reis, an All-American in her freshman year in 2008, was selected to the Brazil women's national football team for the first time in 2009, playing in a friendly against a local Brazilian team in July. Former women's goalkeeper Lynzee Lee played for the Buffalo Flash of the W-League. In 2010, both the men's and women's soccer teams advanced to the NCAA Tournament.

=== Softball ===
The Knights softball program is the youngest team at UCF. It was founded in 2002, and the team officially started competing in the Atlantic Sun Conference in that same year under head coach Renee Luers-Gillispie. Since the program began, the Knights have won five conference tournament championships (2005, 2008, 2015, 2022, 2023), three regular season conference titles (2014, 2015, 2022) and have appeared in the NCAA tournament ten times (2005, 2008, 2010, 2012, 2014, 2015, 2016, 2021, 2022, 2023). Cindy Ball-Malone became the 2nd head coach in UCF softball history in 2019. She has led the Knights to the NCAA Tournament in 2021, 2022 (super regional appearance), and 2023. The Knights also won back to back AAC tournament titles in their last two years in the AAC (2022 and 2023) and a regular season AAC title in 2022 under Malone.

Since joining the Big 12 Conference, the Knights' streak of NCAA Tournament appearances has continued. In their first season in the Big 12 (2024), the Knights made another regional appearance after placing in the top-five in the Big 12 Conference Standings for the regular season. In 2025, the Knights earned yet another NCAA Tournament birth, and played in a regional final despite fielding a team that season made up of roughly 60% Sophomores and Freshmen.

The Knights softball team plays its home games at the UCF Softball Complex.

=== Tennis ===
The men's tennis team was formed in 1970. They reached the NCAA Division II Championship consecutively from 1974 to 1978, including a third-place finish in 1977. Toby Crabel played on the tennis team, and was a 3-time NCAA Division II All-American.

They won the A-Sun Championship three times from 2003 to 2005 under Bobby Cashman. The current men's coach is John Roddick, brother and coach for former tennis pro Andy Roddick.

The women's tennis team was formed in 1972. They have had 3 NCAA Division 1 Tournament appearances.

=== Track and field ===
The Knights women's track and field team has won ten total conference championships, eight in their nine years in the Atlantic Sun Conference, and won the 2010, 2011, 2012 and 2013 C-USA outdoor title, and the 2011 C-USA indoor title. In 2011, the Knights were nationally ranked for the first time in program history, while at the same time ranking as the top team in the state, rising as high as No. 8 in the polls.

The head coach for the track and field program is Caryl Smith-Gilbert, and the assistant coaches are Jeff Chakouian, Paul Brown and LaTonya Loche. Gilbert has coached four All-Americans during her tenure at UCF, including two-time All-American Jackie Coward.

The Knights track and field teams hold their outdoor home meets at the UCF Soccer and Track Stadium, which is part of Knights Plaza.

=== Volleyball ===
The UCF Knights began playing volleyball in 1975. Under their first Head Coach, Lucy McDaniel, the Knights completed a perfect season in 1978, winning the Division II AIAW National Championship for that season, the school's first national championship in any sport.

Throughout the team's history, the Knights have made 17 AIAW or NCAA Tournament appearances. During their time in various conferences, the Knights have wone 14 Conference Tournament Championships and 9 Conference Regular Season Championships. This included a dominant streak in their last five years in the American Athletic Conference, in which they won the Conference Championship five years in a row (2018, 2019, 2020, 2021, 2022) before moving on to the Big 12 Conference. As of 2025, the UCF Volleyball Coach is Matt Botsford (who took over the Knights program in the 2025 season).

=== Former Sports ===
==== Wrestling ====
From 1970 to 1986, UCF sponsored a men's wrestling program. The team qualified for the NCAA Division II championship in 1979 and 1984, finishing in 26th and 29th out of 32 respectively; and the Division I championship in 1986, finishing 71st out of 76. The team was discontinued after 1986 due to financial reasons.

== Championships ==
Upon joining the Big 12 conference, the Knights became one of three Power Five conference schools without an NCAA-awarded team national championship, along with Kansas State and Virginia Tech. Two Knights teams have won national championships, though neither were awarded by the NCAA. The 1978 women's volleyball team captured UCF's first national championship, three years before the NCAA began governing women's sports. The team won the AIAW Small College Division championship as Florida Technological University within days of university leadership's vote to change the school's name.

In 2017 the UCF Knights football team went undefeated and was selected by the Colley Matrix as its top team. The Colley Matrix is a computer ranking formula and is one of more than 40 polls, rankings, and formulas recognized by the NCAA in its list of college football's "national poll leaders" chosen by major selectors. Its selections since 1992 are recognized by the NCAA. The extent of NCAA recognition of all major selectors is in the form of acknowledgment in the annual NCAA Football Guide of the unofficial national champions, but the NCAA reserves the term "national champions" for team who won the College Football Playoff or Bowl Championship Series National Championship games or were ranked first in one or more of the "consensus polls": AP, Coaches Poll, NFF/FWAA (Note: NFF and FWAA conducted separate polls prior to 2014, but are now the same poll. Each poll was considered a consensus poll prior to their merger.) and, formerly, the UPI (therefore, UCF is listed under the "national poll leaders" section rather than the "national champions" section). UCF is the first school to claim a championship that was not awarded by one of the consensus polls since Ole Miss in 1962. UCF was not selected to play in the College Football Playoff in 2017; all major selectors except for Colley Matrix chose Alabama as the 2017 national champion.

Two Knights athletes have won individual national titles as well, one of which came in an NCAA-sanctioned event. The first was when Aurieyall Scott won the 60-meter dash at the 2013 NCAA Women's Indoor Track and Field Championship. The other title came when Trey Hilderbrand won the Men's Singles title in the 2020 ITA Fall Indoor National Championship.

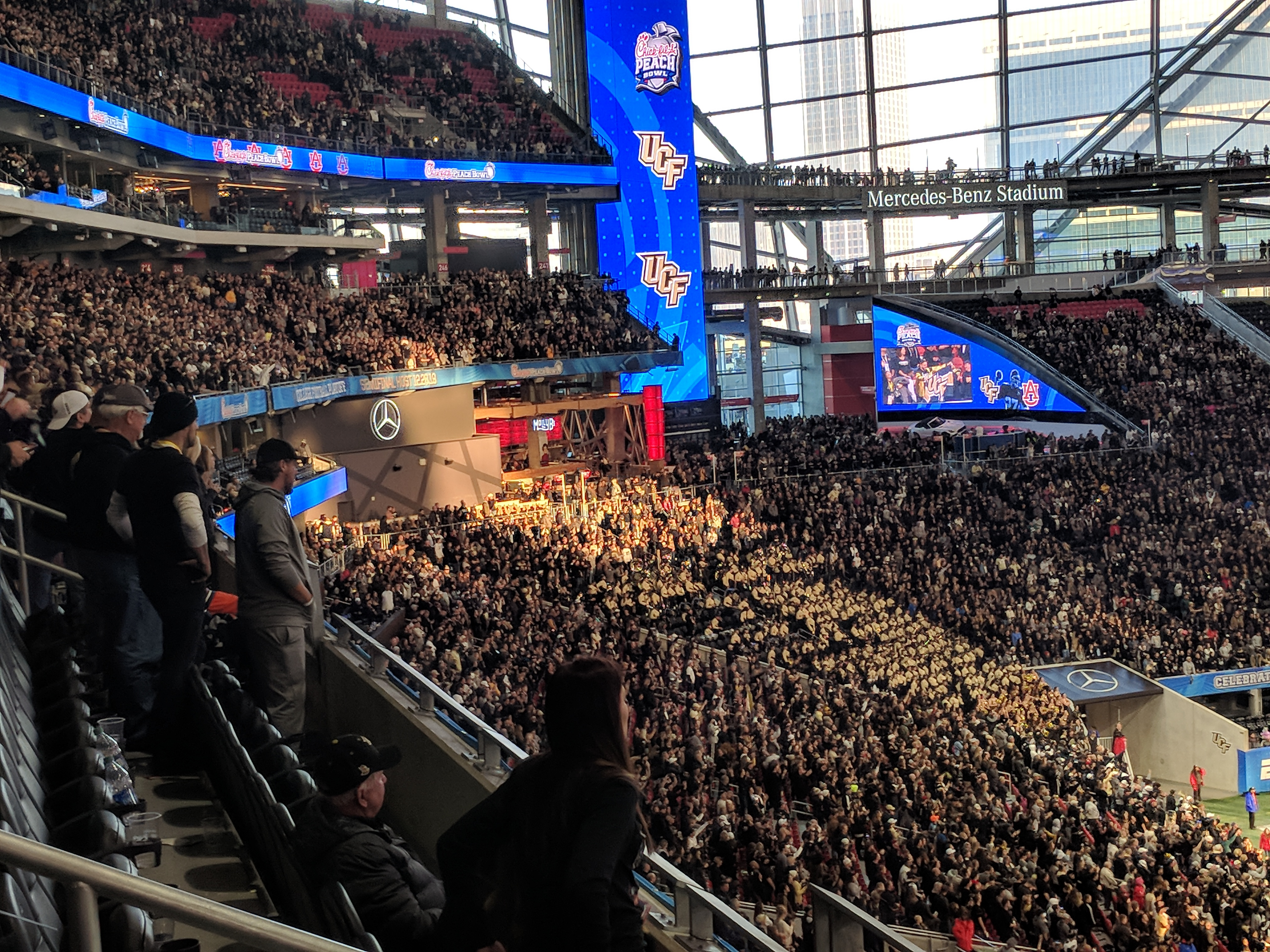
The Knights take on the Auburn Tigers in the Chick-fil-A Peach Bowl, 2018.

=== National championships ===
- Team (2)
- Football (FBS): Non-consensus title; Colley Matrix
- Volleyball (AIAW Small College Division): 1978
- Individual (2)
- Trey Hilderbrand – 2020 ITA Indoor National Fall Championship: Men's Singles
- Aurieyall Scott – 2013 NCAA Division I Women's Indoor Track and Field: 60-meter dash

=== Conference titles in all-sports ===
- Conference USA: 6
- American Conference: 52
- Sun Belt Conference: 1
- Big 12 Conference: 2

== Club sports ==
The University of Central Florida, through the Recreation and Wellness Center and the student government, also fields a number of club sports of varying degrees of competitiveness, though most compete only with other teams from the southeastern part of the country. These sports are funded by the university's student government association. The club sports include bass fishing, badminton, bowling, running, cycling, fencing, golf, equestrian, esports, ice hockey, judo, jiu-jitsu, kiteboarding, lacrosse, paintball, racquetball, rugby, sailing, swimming, surfing, table tennis, taekwondo, team handball, tennis, triathlon, ultimate frisbee, men's volleyball, water polo, water skiing, wheelchair basketball, and wrestling.

=== Ice hockey ===
UCF's ice hockey team was founded in 1997 and competes in College Hockey South in Division III of the American Collegiate Hockey Association. The team plays its home games at the Orlando Ice Den in Maitland, Florida. Former head coach Sean Weaver led the Knights to eight consecutive national tournament appearances, and placed 3rd in the 2007–08 and 2010–11 seasons. The team's current head coach is Chris Brewster.

=== Lacrosse ===
UCF's men's lacrosse teams compete in the SouthEastern Lacrosse Conference of the Men's Collegiate Lacrosse Association at the Division I level. The team was founded in 1997 and plays at the university's intramural fields. It is currently coached by Austin Ricci.

=== Rugby ===
Founded in 1988, UCF's Rugby Club plays in Division I of college rugby in the South Independent Conference against local rivals such as Florida State and South Florida. The Knights are led by Head Coach Raoul Besse. The Knights have enjoyed a success over the last couple of years thanks to back-to-back national champions in D1-AA and a handful of Rugby Sevens tournament wins. In 2015, the Knights qualified for the National Sevens Championship, ranked #1 in the SIRC South Division, and #7 in the country.

The Knights have had one of the better college rugby programs in Florida in recent years. In Fall 2011, UCF reached the finals of the Collegiate Rugby Florida Cup. The Knights finished the 2011–12 season ranked 17th with a record of 12–5, including splitting the season series against No. 6 ranked FSU.

In spring 2013, the Knights won the DI-AA national championship. They defeated Tennessee 31–17 in the round of 16, defeated Clemson 24–20 in the quarterfinals, and defeated Dartmouth 45–38 in the semifinals. UCF won the national championship by defeating Lindenwood in the final 27–25, with team captain Gerhard Veit also scoring two tries.

UCF repeated in 2014 as D1-AA national champion. They beat South Carolina in the quarterfinals (44–28) and San Diego in the semifinals(43–5). UCF defeated Arizona in the final behind the efforts of MVP Scott Watters. The final score was an impressive 64–13.

UCF has also had success in rugby sevens. UCF rugby won the first tournament in Estero in the Fall 2012 Florida Sevens Championship with a 4–0 record, including a 24–5 win over FSU in the final. The Knights went undefeated and beat UNF 36–15 in the final to win the 2012 Florida Cup. The Knights continued this in the 2015 tournament. The Knights (who were the lowest seed) dominated the top ranked team, Middle Tennessee with the final score 31–7. The Knights would go on to win all there matches, including the championship game against Georgia Tech edging them out 19–12.

== War on I-4 rivalry ==
UCF's main rival is the University of South Florida Bulls, who are located 98 miles southwest in Tampa. The first meeting between the two schools was a baseball game in 1971, where the South Florida Golden Brahmans beat the Florida Tech Knights of the Pegasus 5–1. The close geographic proximity and the schools being founded around the same time (South Florida in 1956 and Central Florida in 1963) made the schools naturally become rivals. The two schools became conference foes for the first time in 2013, when UCF joined the American Athletic Conference. The rivalry gets its name from Interstate 4, which runs through both Tampa and Orlando.

The rivalry was officially recognized by both schools on September 21, 2016, when it was announced that a rivalry series between all 14 sports that both schools sponsor would begin (USF is the only one of the two schools to offer men's cross country, women's sailing, and men's track & field while UCF is the only one of the two schools to offer women's rowing). Each sport is worth six total points, and sports where the teams meet head to head multiple times in the regular season will have the six points divided by the number of games played, meaning the point system typically grants:

- 2 points to the winner of each regular season baseball game (3 games per year)
- 3 points to the winner of each regular season men's basketball game (2 games per year)
- 3 points to the winner of each regular season women's basketball game (2 games per year)
- 6 points to the higher finisher at the American Athletic Conference Women's Cross Country Championship
- 6 points to the winner of the annual football game
- 6 points to the higher finisher at the American Athletic Conference Men's Golf Championship
- 6 points to the higher finisher at the American Athletic Conference Women's Golf Championship
- 6 points to the winner of the annual regular season men's soccer match (3 points awarded to each side in the event of a draw)
- 6 points to the winner of the annual regular season women's soccer match (3 points awarded to each side in the event of a draw)
- 2 points to the winner of each regular season softball game (3 games per year)
- 6 points to the winner of the annual regular season men's tennis match.
- 6 points to the winner of the annual regular season women's tennis match.
- 3 points to the higher finisher at the American Athletic Conference Women's Indoor Track & Field Championship
- 3 points to the higher finisher at the American Athletic Conference Women's Outdoor Track & Field Championship
- 3 points to the winner of each regular season volleyball match (2 matches per year)
- In the event of a tie in the overall competition, the athletic program that scores higher in the annual NCAA Graduation Success Rate will be awarded 1 extra point and crowned as the champion for that season. In the unlikely event that this is also tied, the series ends as a tie for that season and the previous winner retains the trophy.

Only regular season matches are counted toward War on I-4 point totals for the 10 sports in which the teams compete head to head, meaning if the teams meet in a conference or NCAA tournament that game doesn't count for War on I-4 competition purposes. The winner each year will take possession of a large trophy shaped like an Interstate road sign, which will be displayed on their campus for the following year. One side of the trophy reads "Tampa" and features the USF logo while the other reads "Orlando" and features the UCF logo. The winner of the annual Thanksgiving weekend football clash receives a similarly shaped "War On I-4" trophy. As of 2024, UCF leads in the all-time series for football (8–6), USF leads in men's basketball (27–21), women's basketball (29–16), baseball (75–69), UCF leads in softball (24–19), USF leads in men's soccer (27–9–4), men's tennis (14–9), women's tennis (12–8) and volleyball (43–38), and UCF leads in women's soccer (11–4–4). In AAC conference play, UCF has the conference all-time series lead in football (8–2), men's basketball (14–7), baseball (25–11), softball (21–10), women's tennis (8–5), and volleyball (20–0). USF leads the conference all-time series lead in men's tennis (8–7), women's basketball (13–9), and men's soccer (8–5). UCF and USF are tied in the women's soccer all-time conference lead at 5–5–4. UCF has won all six overall War on I-4 titles since 2024, and led USF in the 2019–2020 edition of the rivalries, but the title was not awarded due to spring sports being canceled by the NCAA because of COVID-19.

== Spirit programs ==
=== Cheerleading ===
The UCF cheerleading squad has captured four national titles at the D1 College Cheerleading and Dance Team Nationals, in 2003, 2007, 2020, and 2024. In 2008, the WE Original weekly series Cheerleader U followed the UCF cheerleaders through an entire season. In 2013, the 2003 UCF Cheerleading Team, who won the UCA College Cheerleading Division IA national championship in 2003, was the first team inducted into the UCF Athletics Hall of Fame.

=== Marching Knights and KnightMoves ===
The Marching Knights were formed after the start of the football program in 1979, and is the largest and most visible student organization at the university. They are known for their high energy performances, unique and contemporary drill designs, and musical selections ranging from jazz, to pop, to classical. Over 300 members perform for fans at each home UCF football game and select away games, as well as any bowl games.

The university's coordinated dance team, KnightMoves, is considered to be one of the nation's top college programs, and features 12-18 girls each year. The team performs year round at school and athletic events, such as Spirit Splash, pep rally's, and football and basketball games. KnightMoves has finished in the top-10 of nationals every year since 2003. The team also placed third in 2025 and Top 5: 2003, 2004, 2024 and 2026.

=== Cheers ===
"Black and gold" is a cheer that is very popular at home games, with one part of the student section yelling "Black!", and the other part of the section answering back with their loudest "Gold!" This can go back and forth for several minutes, with both sides competing to be the louder.

Another popular cheer at games occurs during the national anthem when students loudly exclaim "Knight" during the line, "Gave proof through the night that our flag was still there." This cheer is controversial within the fanbase, with some fans finding it disrespectful.

The University of Central Florida Fight Song is titled 'Charge On'.

In 2019, the UCF Cheerleading Team became national champions in the UCA Division 1A Gameday division.

== Athletic facilities ==
Since 2000, the UCF has invested significant capital and effort in the construction, expansion and improvements of its major sports programs and their facilities. In 2007, UCF opened the new 46,000–seat Acrisure Bounce House, and the new 9,000 seat Addition Financial Arena. In 2011, the university renovated the UCF Soccer and Track Stadium, increasing capacity to over 2,000 and adding amenities such as clubhouses and restrooms. In 2011, UCF completed a major renovation of John Euliano Park, expanding it to a total capacity at 4,180.

Since 2017, the men's and women's tennis teams are the only teams who play their home games at a facility that isn't owned by the university, instead playing at the USTA National Campus in Lake Nona roughly 20 miles away from campus. The rowing team is the only other team that does not compete on campus, as the UCF Intercollegiate Rowing Center is on Lake Pickett, about eight miles from campus.

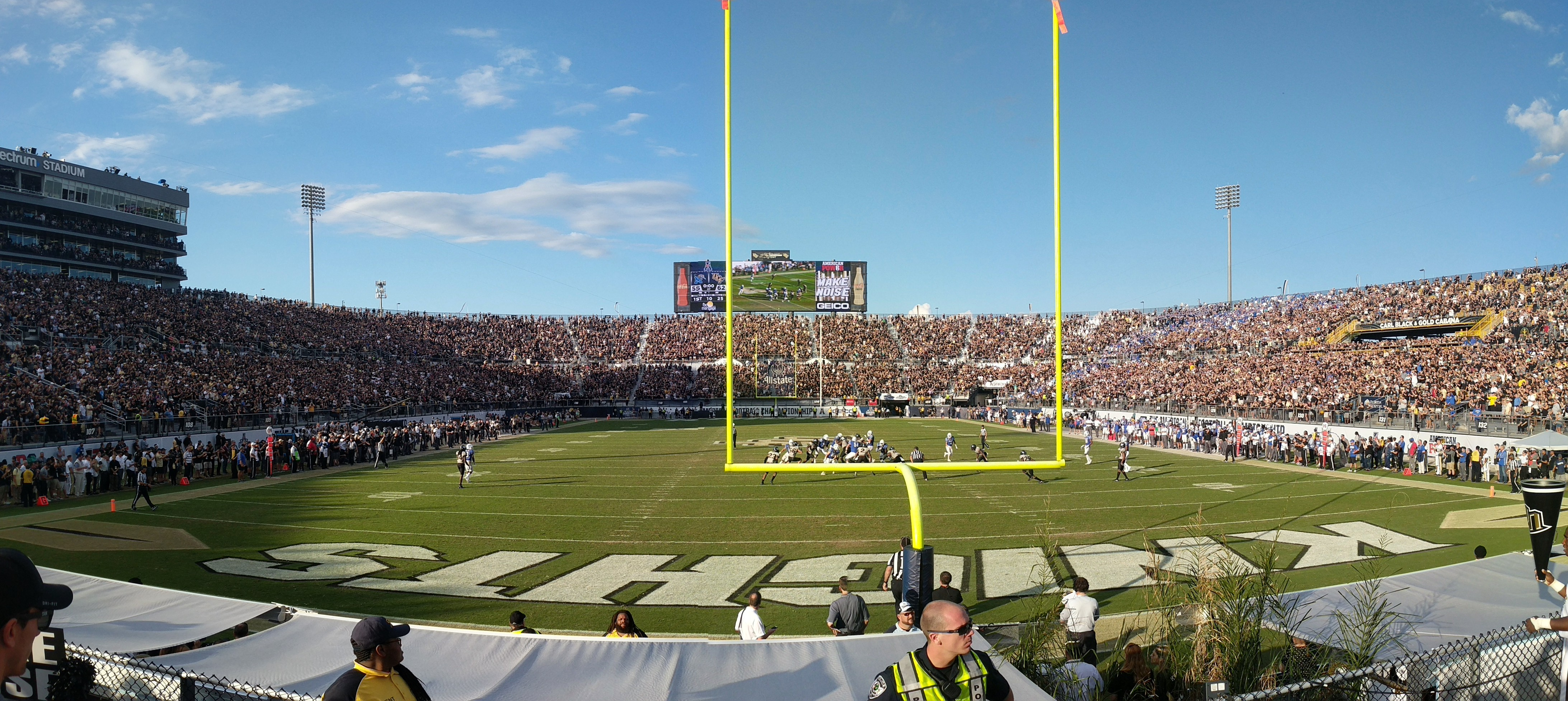
Acrisure Bounce House

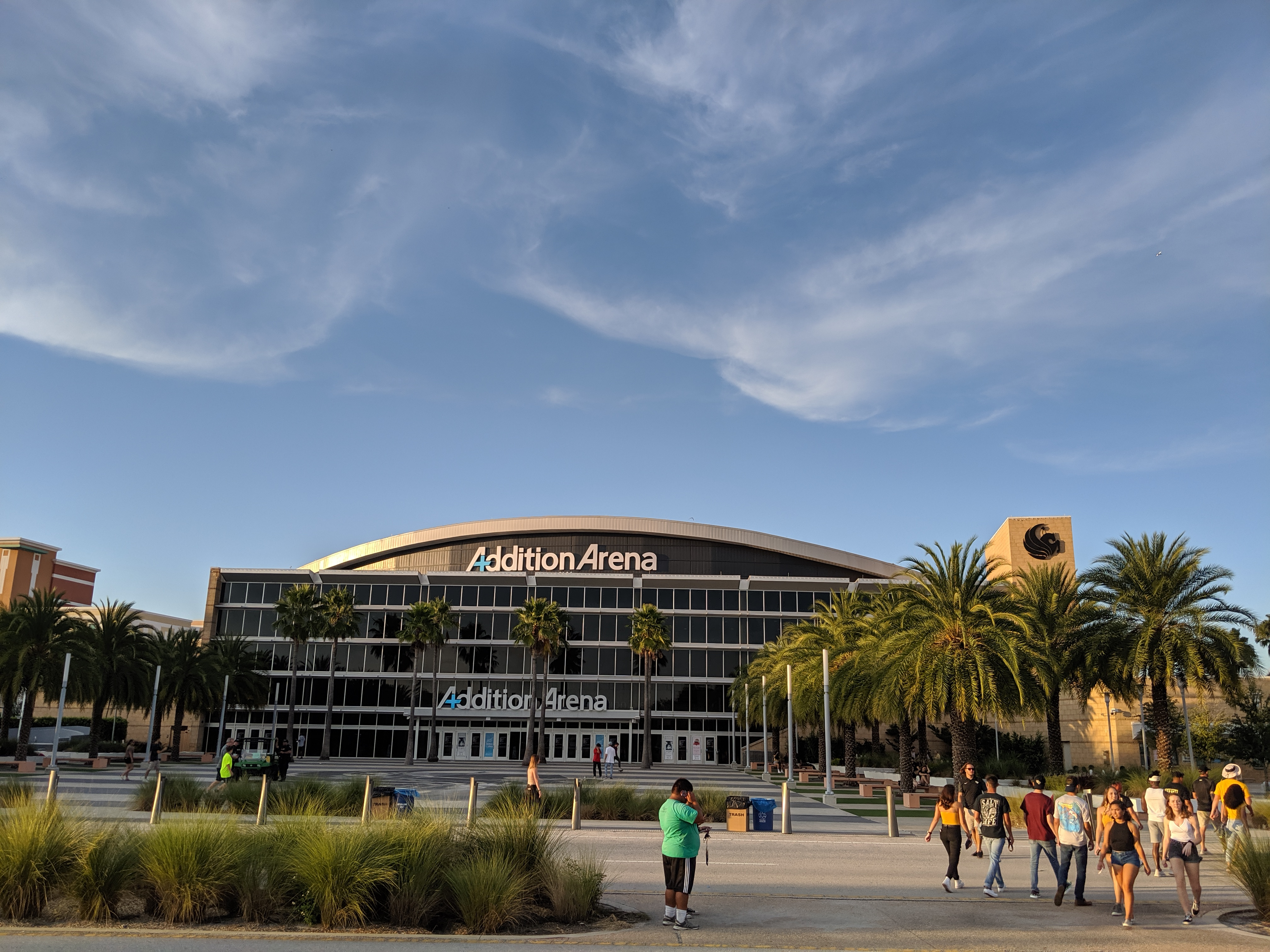
Addition Financial Arena

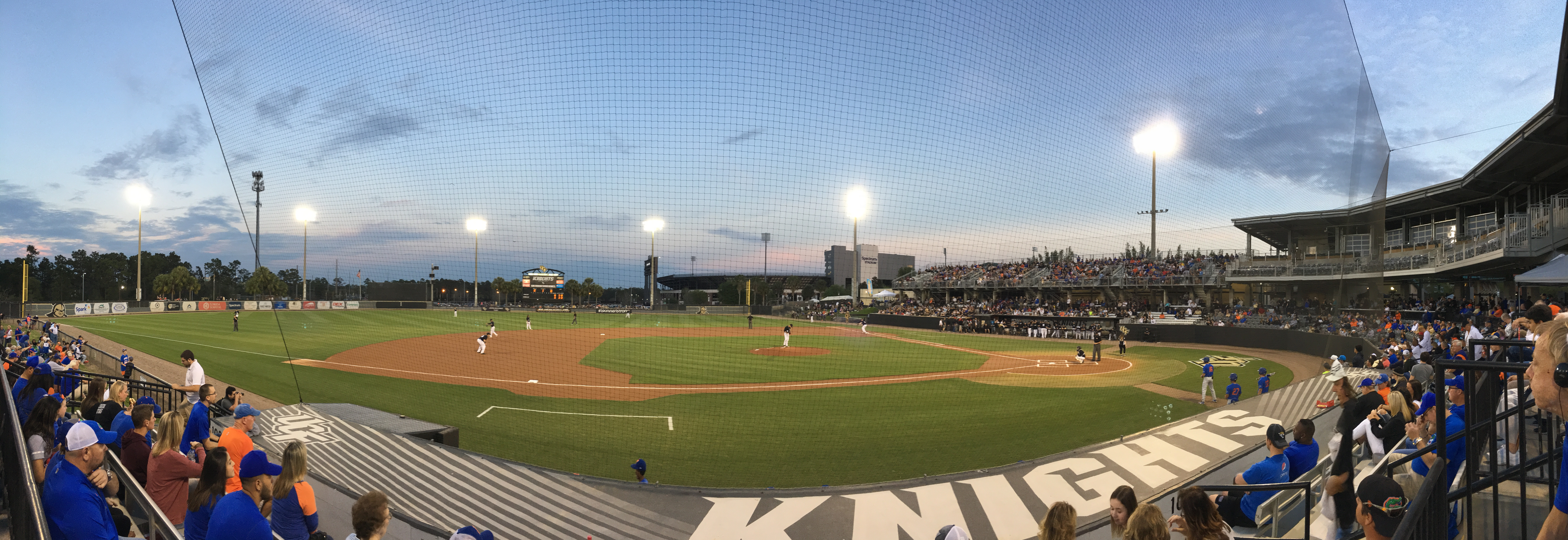
John Euliano Park

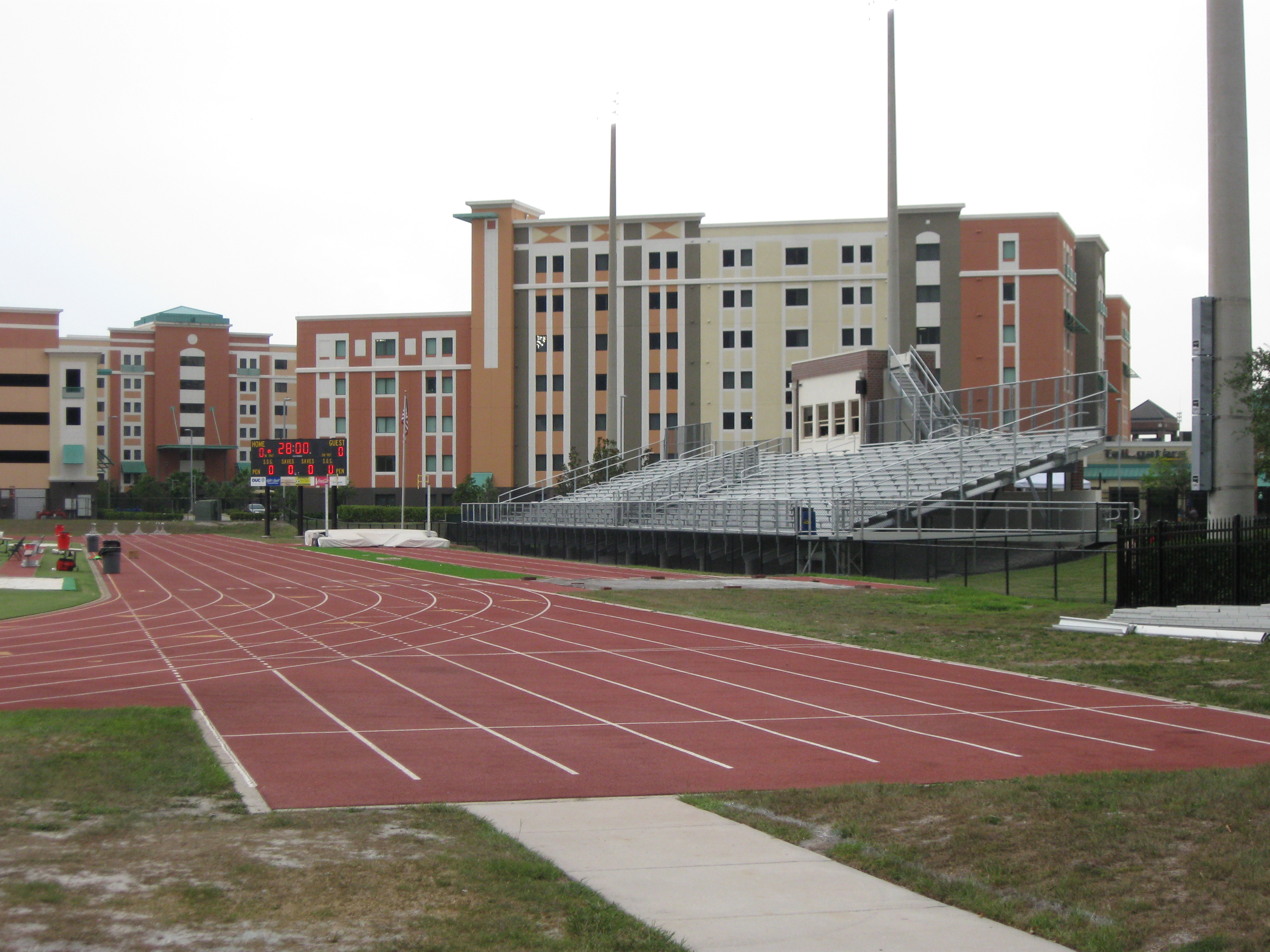
UCF Soccer and Track Stadium

== Notable alumni ==
As a competitor in college athletics, UCF has many notable student athletes, coaches and staff members, such as NFL players Blake Bortles, A. J. Bouye, Daunte Culpepper, Gabe Davis, Richie Grant, Brandon Marshall, Latavius Murray, Matt Prater, Josh Sitton, Asante Samuel, and twin brothers Shaquem and Shaquill Griffin; NBA players Taylor Hendricks and Tacko Fall; NASCAR driver Aric Almirola; and soccer stars Michelle Akers and Sean Johnson. Currently, more than 50 UCF alumni compete in professional basketball, football, baseball and golf.

== Athletic directors ==
Athletic director	Years
Frank Rohter	1968-1974
Jack O'Leary	1976–1981
Bill Peterson	1982–1985
Gene McDowell	1985–1992
Steve Sloan	1993–2002
Steve Orsini	2002–2006
Keith R. Tribble	2006–2011
Todd Stansbury	2012–2015
George O'Leary (interim)	2015
Danny White	2015–2021
Terry Mohajir	2021–Present

== See also ==
- List of college athletic programs in Florida
