= Citronaut =

First unofficial mascot of Florida Technological University

- Cover of the 1968–69 student handbook
- University: Florida Technological University (now University of Central Florida)
- Conference: Big 12 Conference
- Origin of name: Portmanteau of "Citrus" and "astronaut"
- First seen: Fall 1968; 58 years ago
- Related mascot(s): Knightro, Glycerin (retired)

The Citronaut was the first unofficial mascot of Florida Technological University (FTU), which later became the University of Central Florida (UCF). Citronaut appeared on the first student handbook in 1968–1969. The Citronaut is still in use today.

== History ==
The Citronaut was designed by Norman Van Meter, the brother-in-law of FTU's then-president Charles N. Millican in an attempt to combine the two major themes of Central Florida at the time: the citrus industry, and the space program. Van Meter did not intend for the design to be the University's mascot. Florida produces approximately 100 million boxes of citrus annually, and FTU was founded in 1963 to provide personnel to support NASA at the Kennedy Space Center and Cape Canaveral Air Force Station. As the academic scope of the university broadened, it was renamed the University of Central Florida in 1978.

After one year, students petitioned the university's student government to establish a new mascot for the university. In 1970, students approved "Knights of the Pegasus" as the second official university mascot, which remains to this day (albeit after being simplified to "Knights").

The Citronaut was largely dormant until the UCF baseball team developed a retro uniform in 2014 that featured the Citronaut which started a powerful renaissance of the original mascot. As of 2022, “Naut” an abbreviation of Citronaut has been promoted by the UCF Athletics social media department and numerous officially licensed Citronaut and “Naut” clothing and merchandise items have become available for sale to the public.

== Modern appearances ==
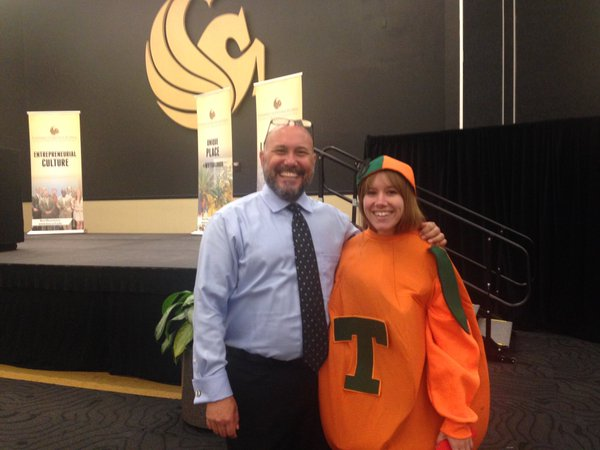
Modern Citronaut costume

Since 2014, the Citronaut has experienced a renaissance in university publications, athletics programing, and merchandise.

- May 10, 2014 – UCF Baseball proclaimed Citronaut Day
- September 19, 2015 – UCF Men's Soccer played in faux back Citronaut uniforms
- Spring 2016 – Knights in Space
- November 2018 – Citronaut appears on uniforms of the UCF football team against Temple in the themed Space Game.
- November 2019 – Citronaut appears on uniforms of the UCF football team against Houston Cougars in the themed Space Game that took off at noon on Saturday, November 2, 2019.
- April 2022 - Citronaut appears on UCF softball uniforms in a game against Virginia Tech.
- March 4, 2023 - Citronaut appears on themed UCF baseball uniforms in a game against Georgia Southern.
- June 6, 2024 - Citronaut appears on a retro track uniform at the 2024 NCAA Track and Field National Championships.
