= 2016 Houston Cougars football team =

American college football season

2016 Houston Cougars football

Las Vegas Bowl, L 10–34 vs. San Diego State
- Conference: American Athletic Conference
- West Division
- Record: 9–4 (5–3 The American)
- Head coach: Tom Herman (2nd season; regular season); Major Applewhite (bowl game)
- Offensive coordinator: Major Applewhite (2nd season)
- Offensive scheme: Spread
- Defensive coordinator: Todd Orlando (2nd season)
- Co-defensive coordinator: Craig Naivar (2nd season)
- Base defense: 3–4
- Captains: Cameron Malveaux; Tyler McCloskey; Greg Ward Jr.; Brandon Wilson
- Home stadium: TDECU Stadium

2016 American Athletic Conference football standings
| | Conf. | | | Overall |
| Team | W | | L | W | | L |
|---|---|---|---|---|---|---|
East Division
| Temple xy$ | 7 | – | 1 | 10 | – | 4 |
| No. 19 South Florida x | 7 | – | 1 | 11 | – | 2 |
| UCF | 4 | – | 4 | 6 | – | 7 |
| Cincinnati | 1 | – | 7 | 4 | – | 8 |
| UConn | 1 | – | 7 | 3 | – | 9 |
| East Carolina | 1 | – | 7 | 3 | – | 9 |
West Division
| Navy xy | 7 | – | 1 | 9 | – | 5 |
| Tulsa | 6 | – | 2 | 10 | – | 3 |
| Memphis | 5 | – | 3 | 8 | – | 5 |
| Houston | 5 | – | 3 | 9 | – | 4 |
| SMU | 3 | – | 5 | 5 | – | 7 |
| Tulane | 1 | – | 7 | 4 | – | 8 |
Championship: Temple 34, Navy 10
$ – Conference champion; x – Division champion/co-champions; y – Championship game participant; Rankings from AP Poll

The 2016 Houston Cougars football team represented the University of Houston in the 2016 NCAA Division I FBS football season. It was the 69th year of season play for Houston. They were led by head coach Tom Herman during the regular season and played their home games at TDECU Stadium in Houston. The Houston Cougars football team is a member of the American Athletic Conference in its West Division. They finished the season 9–4, 5–3 in American Athletic play to finish in a tie for third place in the West Division. They were invited to the Las Vegas Bowl where they lost to San Diego State.

On November 26, head coach Tom Herman resigned to become the head coach at Texas. He finished at Houston with a two-year record of 22–4. Houston was led by new head coach Major Applewhite in the Las Vegas Bowl.

== Offseason ==
=== Coaching departures ===
After serving as wide receivers coach and recruiting coordinator at Houston for one year, Drew Mehringer was named as offensive coordinator and quarterbacks coach for Rutgers on December 14, 2015.

=== 2016 recruiting class ===
College recruiting
| Name | Hometown | School | Height | Weight | 40^{‡} | Commit date |
|---|---|---|---|---|---|---|
Overall recruit ranking:
Note: In many cases, Scout, Rivals, 247Sports, On3, and ESPN may conflict in their listings of height and weight.; In these cases, the average was taken. ESPN grades are on a 100-point scale.; Sources: "2016 Team Ranking". Rivals.com.

==== Walk-on recruits ====
College recruiting
| Name | Hometown | School | Height | Weight | Commit date |
|---|---|---|---|---|---|
Overall recruit ranking:
Note: In many cases, Scout, Rivals, 247Sports, On3, and ESPN may conflict in their listings of height and weight.; In these cases, the average was taken. ESPN grades are on a 100-point scale.; Sources: "2016 Team Ranking". Rivals.com.

National signing day was on Wednesday, February 3, 2016.

=== Spring practice ===
The Houston Cougars football team held its annual Red and White Spring Game on Saturday, April 16, 2016, at TDECU Stadium. The defense (White) defeated the offense (Red) 74–72.

=== Personnel ===
==== Roster ====
2016 Houston Cougars Football
| Quarterback: 1 Greg Ward – senior (5'11, 190); 3 Kyle Postma – junior (6'3, 205); 4 D'Eriq King – freshman (5'10, 170); 8 Hunter McCoy – senior (6'4, 220); 10 Kyle Allen – junior (6'3, 210); 12 Bowman Sells – freshman (6'2, 202); 13 Mason McClendon – sophomore (5'10, 190); 16 Bear Fenimore – sophomore (6'1, 215); Tailback: 2 Duke Catalon – sophomore (6'0, 210); 20 Kalig Kokuma – sophomore (5'11, 210); 25 Chandler Smith – freshman (5'7, 180); 28 Josh Burrell – (redshirt) freshman (5'10, 247); 32 Kevrin Justice – (redshirt) freshman (5'11, 190); 34 Mulbah Car – freshman (5'11, 194); 46 Patrick Carr – sophomore (5'10, 195); 48 Michael Dunn – sophomore (5'10, 200); 49 Blake Hirsch – sophomore (6'0, 220); Wide receiver: 5 Ra'Shaad Samples – junior (5'11, 190); 7 Marquez Stevenson – freshman (6'0, 175) *; 9 Courtney Lark – freshman (6'1, 163) *; 14 Isaiah Johnson – sophomore (6'4, 205); 15 Linell Bonner – junior (6'0, 202); 17 Terry Mark – freshman (6'1, 190); 18 Keith Corbin – freshman (6'2, 175); 21 Chance Allen – senior (6'3, 215); 23 Kinte Hatton – junior (5'10, 170); 27 Christian Luke – freshman (6'2, 215); 30 Tristen Gomez – sophomore (5'6, 166); 39 Keisland Smalls – freshman (5'9, 185); 80 Tren'Davian Dickson – freshman (5'11, 175); 83 Derek McLemore – junior (6'0, 197); 85 John Leday – junior (6'0, 200); 86 Colton Cerday – (redshirt) freshman (6'0, 216); 88 Steven Dunbar – junior (6'3, 200); Tight end: 45 Tyler McCloskey – senior (6'2, 245); 82 Romello Brooker – sophomore (6'4, 240); 84 Chris Johnson – junior (6'5, 235); 87 Alex Leslie – junior (6'5, 240); 89 Byron Simpson – junior (6'5, 260) | Offensive Lineman: 51 Na'Ty Rodgers – junior (6'5, 292); 52 Braylon Jones – freshman (6'3, 278); 53 Alex Fontana – junior (6'3, 310); 56 Dixie Wooten III – freshman (6'5, 322); 58 Ryan Hirsch – (redshirt) freshman (6'2, 280); 60 Kordell Snyder – freshman (6'3, 265); 61 Ryan Deshotel – (redshirt) freshman (6'4, 272); 62 Jarrid Williams – (redshirt) freshman (6'6, 290); 63 Marc Reid – junior (6'5, 279); 64 Grant Strimple – freshman (6'2, 277); 65 Colby Brignac – freshman (6'1, 290); 66 Cole Miller – freshman (5'11, 298); 69 Will Noble – sophomore (6'4, 290); 70 Mac Long – senior (6'4, 300); 72 Mason Denley – sophomore (6'4, 305); 73 Marcus Oliver – junior (6'3, 295); 74 Josh Jones – (redshirt) freshman (6'5, 280); 75 Jacoby Morrison – freshman (6'2, 251); 76 Kameron Eloph – sophomore (6'3, 294); 77 Keenan Murphy – freshman (6'2, 295); 79 Josh Thomas – junior (6'6, 332); Defensive line: 10 Ed Oliver – freshman (6'2, 290); 17 Chauntez Jackson – senior (6'5, 280); 27 D.J. Jenkins – (redshirt) freshman (6'2, 260); 50 Aymiel Fleming – freshman (6'2, 284); 52 Jerard Carter – sophomore (6'3, 297); 59 Zorrell Ezell – senior (6'1, 285); 90 Zach Vaughan – sophomore (6'4, 270); 91 Nick Thurman – junior (6'4, 290); 93 B.J. Singleton – senior (6'4, 314); 94 Cameron Malveaux – senior (6'6, 270); 96 Blaine Medland – sophomore (6'0, 246); Long snappers: 31 Jon Letter – freshman (6'3, 191); 48 Zach Faires – senior (6'2, 235); 57 Payton Pardee – (redshirt) freshman (5'10, 190); 97 Nick Wildberger – sophomore (6'1, 210); Placekicker: 41 Joel Scarbrough – (redshirt) freshman (5'10, 182); 44 Luke Hogan – freshman (6'1, 192); 47 Ty Cummings – senior (6'0, 185); 95 Mason Tobola – freshman (6'2, 205) | Linebacker: 8 Emeke Egbule – sophomore (6'3, 230); 9 Matthew Adams – junior (6'1, 230); 12 D'Juan Hines – junior (6'1, 225); 20 Roman Brown – sophomore (6'0, 220); 21 Ralph Harvey Jr. – senior (6'2, 245); 32 Khari Dotson – sophomore (6'1, 210); 33 Ja'Von Shelley – sophomore (6'1, 230); 36 Nomluis Fruge – junior (6'0, 225); 41 Steven Taylor – senior (6'1, 225); 43 Leroy Godfrey – (redshirt) freshman (6'3, 240); 46 Jordan Milburn – (redshirt) freshman (6'1, 225); 51 Rasheed Tynes – junior (5'11, 220); 54 Cameron Doubenmier – junior (5'11, 220); 55 Davonte Thomas – senior (6'1, 220); 81 Tyus Bowser – senior (6'3, 240); 86 Kobe Idumwonyi – (redshirt) freshman (6'2, 245); Cornerback: 4 Ka'Darian Smith – freshman (6'0, 172); 6 Howard Wilson – sophomore (6'1, 185); 7 Patrick Rosette – freshman (6'1, 195); 13 Joeal Williams – sophomore (5'10, 185); 19 Javian Smith – freshman (6'1, 165); 24 Jeremy Winchester – sophomore (6'0, 190); 25 Dillon Birden – junior (5'9, 172); 26 Brandon Wilson – senior (5'11, 200); 30 Andrew Robertson – sophomore (5'9, 176); 35 Andrew Mathis – sophomore (6'0, 204); 40 Alexander Myres – junior (5'10, 184); Safety: 1 Garrett Davis – sophomore (6'1, 200); 2 Khalil Williams – junior (6'0, 200); 5 Collin Wilder – freshman (5'11, 175); 18 Michael Eke – (redshirt) freshman (6'2, 205); 22 Austin Robinson – junior (6'3, 220); 23 Terrell Williams – junior (6'3, 210); 29 Darius Gilbert – (redshirt) freshman (6'2, 195); 31 D'Aundre Holmes-Wilfork – freshman (5'10, 183); 37 Caemen Mayfield – sophomore (5'10, 204); 42 Grayson Thorburn – freshman (6'2, 205); Punter: 38 Dane Roy – freshman (6'7, 230) |

==== Depth chart ====
The list of starters is to be announced.

== Schedule ==
Houston played UCF, UConn, Tulane and Tulsa at home and Cincinnati, Memphis, Navy and SMU on the road. The conference schedule was released February 9.

| Date | Time | Opponent | Rank | Site | TV | Result | Attendance |
|---|---|---|---|---|---|---|---|
| September 3 | 11:00 a.m. | vs. No. 3 Oklahoma* | No. 15 | NRG Stadium; Houston, TX (Texas Kickoff) | ABC | W 33–23 | 71,016 |
| September 10 | 11:00 a.m. | Lamar* | No. 6 | TDECU Stadium; Houston, TX | ASN | W 42–0 | 39,402 |
| September 15 | 6:30 p.m. | at Cincinnati | No. 6 | Nippert Stadium; Cincinnati, OH | ESPN | W 40–16 | 40,015 |
| September 24 | 6:00 p.m. | at Texas State* | No. 6 | Bobcat Stadium; San Marcos, TX | ESPNU | W 64–3 | 33,133 |
| September 29 | 7:00 p.m. | UConn | No. 6 | TDECU Stadium; Houston, TX | ESPN | W 42–14 | 40,873 |
| October 8 | 2:00 p.m. | at Navy | No. 6 | Navy–Marine Corps Memorial Stadium; Annapolis, MD | CBSSN | L 40–46 | 34,531 |
| October 15 | 6:00 p.m. | Tulsa | No. 13 | TDECU Stadium; Houston, TX | ESPN2 | W 38–31 | 38,221 |
| October 22 | 6:00 p.m. | at SMU | No. 11 | Gerald J. Ford Stadium; Dallas, TX (rivalry) | ESPN2 | L 16–38 | 32,000 |
| October 29 | 11:00 a.m. | UCF | | TDECU Stadium; Houston, TX | ESPNU | W 31–24 | 35,846 |
| November 12 | 2:30 p.m. | Tulane^{†} | | TDECU Stadium; Houston, TX | CBSSN | W 30–18 | 36,552 |
| November 17 | 8:00 p.m. | No. 5 Louisville* | | TDECU Stadium; Houston, TX | ESPN | W 36–10 | 42,822 |
| November 25 | 11:00 a.m. | at Memphis | No. 20 | Liberty Bowl Memorial Stadium; Memphis, TN | ABC | L 44–48 | 36,527 |
| December 17 | 2:30 p.m. | vs. San Diego State* | | Sam Boyd Stadium; Whitney, NV (Las Vegas Bowl) | ABC | L 10–34 | 29,286 |
*Non-conference game; ^{†}Homecoming; Rankings from AP Poll (and CFP Rankings, after November 1) - Released prior to game; All times are in Central time

Schedule source:

== Game summaries ==
=== Vs. Oklahoma ===
#3 Oklahoma Sooners vs #15 Houston Cougars – Game summary

| Quarter | 1 | 2 | 3 | 4 | Total |
|---|---|---|---|---|---|
| #3 Oklahoma | 10 | 7 | 0 | 6 | 23 |
| #15 Houston | 3 | 16 | 14 | 0 | 33 |

at NRG Stadium • Houston, TX Texas Kickoff

- Date: September 3, 2016
- Game time: 11:07 a.m. CDT
- Game weather: Temperature: 72 °F (22 °C) • Wind: Calm • Weather: Indoor
- Game attendance: 71,016
- Referee: Cooper Castleberry
- TV announcers (ABC): Dave Pasch (play-by-play), Greg McElroy (color), & Tom Luginbill (sideline)

Game information

First Quarter

- OU 11:43 Joe Mixon 32 yd, Austin Seibert XP Good (OU 7–0)
- HOU 8:13 Ty Cumings 25 yd field goal (OU 7–3)
- OU 6:12 Austin Seibert 25 yd field goal (OU 10–3)

Second Quarter

- HOU 14:56 Ty Cummings 26 yd field goal (OU 10–6)
- HOU 10:12 Duke Catalon 15 yd pass from Greg Ward Jr.; Ty Cummings XP Good (HOU 13–10)
- OU 8:37 Mark Andrews 64 yd pass from Baker Mayfield; Austin Seibert XP Good (OU 17–13)
- HOU 4:33 Ty Cummings 33 yd field goal (OU 17–16)
- HOU 0:00 Ty Cummings 47 yd field goal (HOU 19–17)

Third Quarter

- HOU 8:28 Bradon Wilson 100 yd missed FG return;Ty Cummings XP Good (HOU 26–17)
- HOU 2:15 T. McCloskey 2 yd pass from Greg Ward Jr.; Ty Cummings XP Good (HOU 33–17)

Fourth Quarter

- OU 2:05 Mark Andrews 25 yd pass from Baker Mayfield; Baker Mayfield 2 pt conversion pass failed (HOU 33–23)

Top Passers

- OU – Baker Mayfield – 24/33, 323 Yds ,2 TD
- HOU – Greg Ward Jr. – 23/40, 321 YD, 2 TD

Top Rushers

- OU– Joe Mixon – 6 attempts, 33 yards
- HOU – Duke Catalon – 22 attempts, 88 yards

Top Receiving

- OU – Mark Andrews – 3 receptions, 94 yards, 2 TD
- HOU – Steven Dunbar – 7 receptions, 125 yards

Top Tacklers

- OU– Will Johnson – 10 tackles
- HOU – Brandon Wilson – 10 tackles

=== Lamar ===
Lamar Cardinals vs #6 Houston Cougars – Game summary

| Quarter | 1 | 2 | 3 | 4 | Total |
|---|---|---|---|---|---|
| Lamar | 0 | 0 | 0 | 0 | 0 |
| #6 Houston | 14 | 14 | 7 | 7 | 42 |

at TDECU Stadium • Houston, TX

- Date: September 10, 2016
- Game time: 05:25 p.m. CDT
- Game weather: Temperature: 88 °F (31 °C) • Wind: N 3 mph• Weather: Cloudy and Humid
- Game attendance: 39,402
- Referee: Rick Loumiet
- TV announcers (ESPN3): Brett Dolan and N.D. Kalu
- Sources:UHCougars.com LamarCardinals.com

Game information

First Quarter

- HOU 12:00 Kyle Postma 39 yd run; Ty Cummings XP good (HOU 7–0)
- HOU 00:33 Kevrin Justice 1 yd run; Ty Cummings XP good (HOU 14–0)

Second Quarter

- HOU 7:33 Mulbah Car 2 yd run; Ty Cummings XP good (HOU 21–0)
- HOU 5:02 Kevrin Justice 1 yd run; Ty Cummings XP good (HOU 28–0)

Third Quarter

- HOU 11:34 Kyle Postma 5 yd run; Ty Cummings XP good (HOU 35–0)

Fourth Quarter

- HOU 11:12 Josh Burrell 2 yd run; Ty Cummings XP good (HOU 42–0)

Top Passers

- LAMAR – Andrew Allen – 6/9, 44 yards
- HOU – Kyle Postma – 14/25, 125 yards, 1 INT

Top Rushers

- LAMAR – Kad Harrington – 15 attempts, 34 yards
- HOU – Kevrin Justice – 27 attempts, 111 yards, 2 TD

Top Receiving

- LAMAR – DeWan Thompson – 2 receptions, 25 yards
- HOU – Linell Bonner – 3 receptions, 46 yards

Top Tacklers

- LAMAR – Xavier Bethany – 14 tackles
- HOU – Steven Taylor – 7 tackles

=== At Cincinnati ===
#6 Houston Cougars at Cincinnati Bearcats – Game summary

| Quarter | 1 | 2 | 3 | 4 | Total |
|---|---|---|---|---|---|
| #6 Houston | 7 | 3 | 2 | 28 | 40 |
| Cincinnati | 7 | 3 | 0 | 6 | 16 |

at Nippert Stadium • Cincinnati, OH

- Date: September 15, 2016
- Game time: 07:34 p.m. CDT
- Game weather: Temperature: 80 °F (27 °C) • Wind: Calm • Weather: Sunny
- Game attendance: 40,015
- Referee: Adam Savoie
- TV announcers (ESPN): Dave Flemming, Jesse Palmer, and Laura Rutledge
- Sources:UHCougars.com

Game information

First Quarter

- HOU 08:00 Chance Allen 39 yd pass from Greg Ward Jr.; Ty Cummings XP good (HOU 7–0)
- CIN 06:12 Devin Gray 61 yd pass from Hayden Moore; Andrew Gantz XP good (TIED 7–7)

Second Quarter

- HOU 02:58 Ty Cummings 32 yd FG good (HOU 10–7)
- CIN 00:04 Andrew Gantz 37 yd FG good (TIED 10–10)

Third Quarter

- HOU 10:30 Team Safety (HOU 12–10)

Fourth Quarter

- CIN 14:57 Nate Cole 4 yd pass from Hayden Moore (CIN 16–12)
- HOU 11:45 Greg Ward Jr. 12 yd run; Ty Cummings XP good (HOU 19–16)
- HOU 06:16 Greg Ward Jr. 3 yd run; Ty Cummings XP good (HOU 26–16)
- HOU 03:47 Steven Taylor 74 yd interception return; Ty Cummings XP good (HOU 33–16)
- HOU 03:40 Howard Wilson 28 yd interception return; Ty Cummings XP good (HOU 40–16)

Top Passers

- HOU – Greg Ward Jr. – 24/36, 326 yards, 1 TD, 2 INT
- CIN – Hayden Moore – 21/37, 275 yards, 2 TD, 2 INT

Top Rushers

- HOU – Greg Ward Jr. – 26 attempts, 109 yards, 2 TD
- CIN – Mike Boone – 12 attempts, 31 yards

Top Receiving

- HOU – Chance Allen – 5 receptions, 94 yards, 1 TD
- CIN – Devin Gray – 4 receptions, 97 yards, 1 TD

Top Tacklers

- HOU – Steven Taylor – 9 tackles, 1 INT
- CIN – Antonio Kinard – 18 tackles

=== At Texas State ===
#6 Houston Cougars at Texas State Bobcats – Game summary

| Quarter | 1 | 2 | 3 | 4 | Total |
|---|---|---|---|---|---|
| #6 Houston | 16 | 27 | 14 | 7 | 64 |
| Texas State | 0 | 3 | 0 | 0 | 3 |

at Bobcat Stadium • San Marcos, TX

- Date: September 24, 2016
- Game time: 06:02 p.m. CDT
- Game weather: Temperature: 85 °F (29 °C) • Wind: SE 13 mph • Weather: Clear
- Game attendance: 33,133
- Referee: Charles Lewis
- TV announcers (ESPNU): Anish Shroff, Ahmad Brooks, and Alex Chappell
- Sources:UHCougars.com

Game information

First Quarter

- HOU 10:25 Greg Ward Jr. 10 yd run; Ty Cummings XP failed (HOU 6–0)
- HOU 05:10 D'Eriq King 48 yd pass from Greg Ward Jr.; Ty Cummings XP good (HOU 13–0)
- HOU 02:06 Ty Cummings 31 yd FG good (HOU 16–0)

Second Quarter

- HOU 13:25 Steven Dunbar 15 yd pass from D'Eriq King; Ty Cummings XP blocked (HOU 22–0)
- HOU 10:40 Duke Catalon 13 yd run; Ty Cummings XP good (HOU 29–0)
- TXST 06:59 James Sherman 32 yd FG (HOU 29–3)
- HOU 04:01 Dillon Birden 2 yd run; Ty Cummings XP good (HOU 36–3)
- HOU 00:29 Linell Bonner 5 yd pass from Greg Ward Jr.; Ty Cummings XP good (HOU 43–3)

Third Quarter

- HOU 14:45 D'Eriq King 99 yd kickoff return; Ty Cummings XP good (HOU 50–3)
- HOU 08:12 Kyle Postma 21 yd run; Ty Cummings XP good (HOU 57–3)

Fourth Quarter

- HOU 03:56 Kyle Postma 1 yd run; Ty Cummings XP good (HOU 64–3)

Top Passers

- HOU – Greg Ward Jr. –20/26, 289 yards, 2 TD
- TXST – Tyler Jones – 17/30, 100 yards, 1 INT

Top Rushers

- HOU – Duke Catalon – 10 attempts, 77 yards, 1 TD
- TXST – Stedman Mayberry – 5 attempts, 24 yards

Top Receiving

- HOU – Steven Dunbar – 5 receptions, 79 yards, 1 TD
- TXST – Elijah King – 3 receptions, 31 yards

Top Tacklers

- HOU – Garrett Davis – 7 tackles
- TXST – Bryan London – 11 tackles

=== UConn ===
UConn Huskies at #6 Houston Cougars – Game summary

| Quarter | 1 | 2 | 3 | 4 | Total |
|---|---|---|---|---|---|
| UConn | 0 | 7 | 0 | 7 | 14 |
| #6 Houston | 0 | 28 | 14 | 0 | 42 |

at TDECU Stadium • Houston, TX

- Date: September 29, 2016
- Game time: 7:00 p.m. CDT
- Game weather: Temperature: 78 °F (26 °C) • Wind: N 11 • Weather: Sunny and clear
- Game attendance: 40,873
- Referee: C. Lamertina
- TV announcers (ESPN): Dave Flemming (play-by-play), Jesse Palmer (color), & Laura Rutledge (sideline)
- Sources:UHCougars.com

Game information

Second Quarter

- HOU • 14:20 • Greg Ward Jr. 30 yd run (Ty Cummings kick) • HOU 7–0
- HOU • 09:11 • Dillon Birden 1 yd run (Ty Cummings kick) • HOU 14–0
- HOU • 05:36 • T McCloskey 3 yd pass from Greg Ward Jr. (Ty Cummings kick) • HOU 21–0
- HOU • 01:37 • Steven Dunbar 15 yd pass from Greg Ward Jr. (Ty Cummings kick) • HOU 28–0
- UCONN • 00:30 • Noel Thomas 62 yd pass from Bryant Shirreffs (Bobby Puyol kick) • HOU 28–7

Third Quarter

- HOU • 11:47 • Greg Ward Jr. 10 yd run (Ty Cummings kick) • HOU 35–7
- HOU • 04:58 • Linell Bonner 4 yd pass from Greg Ward Jr. (Ty Cummings kick) • HOU 42–7

Fourth Quarter

- UCONN • 08:42 • Bryant Shirreffs 1 yd run (Bobby Puyol kick) • HOU 42–14

Top Passers

- HOU – Greg Ward Jr. 32/38, 389 yards, 3 TD
- UCONN – Bryant Shirreffs 13/29, 239 yards, 1 TD

Top Rushers

- HOU – Greg Ward Jr. 12 attempts, 65 yards, 2 TD
- UCONN – Noel Thomas 3 attempts, 22 yards

Top Receiving

- HOU – Linell Bonner 12 receptions, 159 yards, 1 TD
- UCONN – Noel Thomas 6 receptions, 135 yards, 1 TD

Top Tacklers

- HOU – K Williams 5 tackles
- UCONN – Vontae Diggs 12 tackles

=== At Navy ===
#6 Houston Cougars at Navy Midshipmen – Game summary

| Quarter | 1 | 2 | 3 | 4 | Total |
|---|---|---|---|---|---|
| #6 Houston | 10 | 10 | 7 | 13 | 40 |
| Navy | 10 | 10 | 21 | 5 | 46 |

at Navy–Marine Corps Memorial Stadium • Annapolis, MD

- Date: October 8, 2016
- Game time: 2:00 p.m. CDT
- Game weather: Temperature: 68 °F (20 °C) • Wind: NNE 5–10 MPH • Weather: Cloudy, Rain
- Game attendance: 34,531
- Referee: Adam Savoie
- TV announcers (CBS Sports Network): John Sadak (play-by-play), Randy Cross (color), and Sheehan Stanwick Burch (sideline)

Game information

First Quarter

- HOU Steven Dunbar 32 yd pass from Greg Ward Jr.; Ty Cummings XP good (HOU 7-0)
- NAVY Chris High 12 yd run; B Moehring XP good (TIE 7-7)
- HOU Ty Cummings 39 yd field goal (HOU 10-7)
- NAVY B Moehring 24 yd field goal (TIE 10-10)

Second Quarter

- HOU Ty Cummings 36 yd field goal (HOU 13-10)
- NAVY Will Worth 2 yd run; B Moehring XP good (NAVY 13-17)
- HOU Dillon Birden 19 yd pass from Greg Ward Jr.; Ty Cummings XP good (HOU 20-17)
- NAVY B Moehring 38 yd field goal (TIE 20-20)

Third Quarter

- NAVY Darryl Bonner 17 yd pass from Will Worth; B Moehring XP good (NAVY 20-27)
- NAVY Josiah Powell 34 yd interception return; B Moehring XP good (NAVY 20-34)
- HOU Greg Ward Jr. 8 yd run; Ty Cummings XP good (NAVY 27-34)
- NAVY Brandon Colon 34 yd pass from Will Worth; B Moehring XP good (NAVY 27-41)

Fourth Quarter

- HOU Dillon Birden 2 yd run; Ty Cummings XP failed (NAVY 33-41)
- NAVY Team safety (NAVY 33-43)
- NAVY B Moehring 40 yd field goal (NAVY 33-46)
- HOU Chance Allen 17 yd pass from Greg Ward Jr.; Ty Cummings XP good (NAVY 40-46)

=== Tulsa ===
Tulsa Golden Hurricane at #13 Houston Cougars – Game summary

| Quarter | 1 | 2 | 3 | 4 | Total |
|---|---|---|---|---|---|
| Tulsa | 3 | 14 | 0 | 14 | 31 |
| #13 Houston | 10 | 7 | 7 | 14 | 38 |

at TDECU Stadium • Houston, TX

- Date: October 15, 2016
- Game time: 6:00 p.m. CDT
- Game attendance: 38,221
- TV announcers (ESPN2): Jason Benetti, Kelly Stouffer, and Paul Carcaterra

Game information

First Quarter

- (12:37) HOU – Dillon Birden 17-yard run; Ty Cummings XP good (HOU 7-0)
- (7:27) TU – Redford Jones 32-yard field goal (HOU 7-3)
- (1:54) HOU – Ty Cummings 33-yard field goal (HOU 10-3)

Second Quarter

- (11:07) HOU – Mulbah Car 6-yard run; Ty Cummings XP good (HOU 17-3)
- (2:55) TU – Corey Taylor II 2-yard run; Redford Jones XP good (HOU 17-10)
- (0:13) TU – Dane Evans 1-yard run; Redford Jones XP good (TIED 17-17)

Third Quarter

- (2:57) HOU – Dillon Birden 6-yard run; Ty Cummings XP good (HOU 24-17)

Fourth Quarter

- (8:29) HOU – Dillon Birden 8-yard run; Ty Cummings XP good (HOU 31-17)
- (7:03) TU – Justin Hobbs 38-yard pass from Dane Evans; Redford Jones XP good (HOU 31-24)
- (3:31) TU – James Flanders 3-yard run; Redford Jones XP good (TIED 31-31)
- (1:21) HOU – Emeke Egbule 24-yard fumble return; Ty Cummings XP good (HOU 38-31)

=== At SMU ===
#11 Houston Cougars at SMU Mustangs – Game summary

| Quarter | 1 | 2 | 3 | 4 | Total |
|---|---|---|---|---|---|
| #11 Houston | 0 | 7 | 7 | 2 | 16 |
| SMU | 7 | 21 | 0 | 10 | 38 |

at Gerald J. Ford Stadium • Dallas, TX

- Date: October 22, 2016
- Game time: 6:00 p.m. CDT
- Game attendance: 32,000
- TV announcers (ESPN2): Jason Benetti, Kelly Stouffer, and Paul Carcaterra

=== UCF ===
UCF Knights at Houston Cougars – Game summary

| Quarter | 1 | 2 | 3 | 4 | Total |
|---|---|---|---|---|---|
| UCF | 7 | 14 | 3 | 0 | 24 |
| Houston | 0 | 3 | 14 | 14 | 31 |

at TDECU Stadium • Houston, TX

- Date: October 29, 2016
- Game time: 11:00 a.m. CDT
- Game attendance: 35,846
- TV announcers (ESPNU): Roy Philpott, Tom Ramsey, and Dawn Davenport

=== Tulane ===
Tulane Green Wave at Houston Cougars – Game summary

| Quarter | 1 | 2 | 3 | 4 | Total |
|---|---|---|---|---|---|
| Tulane | 7 | 3 | 0 | 8 | 18 |
| Houston | 14 | 14 | 0 | 2 | 30 |

at TDECU Stadium • Houston, TX

- Date: November 12, 2016
- Game time: 2:30 p.m. CST
- Game attendance: 36,552
- TV announcers (CBSSN): Dave Ryan, Corey Chavous, and Melanie Collins

=== Louisville ===
#3 Louisville Cardinals at Houston Cougars – Game summary

| Quarter | 1 | 2 | 3 | 4 | Total |
|---|---|---|---|---|---|
| #3 Louisville | 0 | 0 | 7 | 3 | 10 |
| Houston | 10 | 21 | 0 | 5 | 36 |

at TDECU Stadium • Houston, TX

- Date: November 17, 2016
- Game time: 7:00 p.m. CST
- Game attendance: 42,822
- TV announcers (ESPN): Dave Flemming, Jesse Palmer, and Allison Williams

Game information

First quarter

- (14:49) HOU – Duke Catalon 13-yard pass from Greg Ward Jr., Ty Cummings kick (HOU 7–0)
- (0:49) HOU – Ty Cummings 33-yard field goal (HOU 10–0)

Second quarter

- (12:18) HOU – Duke Catalon 13-yard pass from Greg Ward Jr., Ty Cummings kick (HOU 17–0)
- (6:53) HOU – Duke Catalon 2-yard run, Ty Cummings kick (HOU 24–0)
- (5:13) HOU – Chance Allen 50-yard pass from Linell Bonner, Ty Cummings kick (HOU 31–0)

Third quarter

- (10:02) LOU – Cole Hikutini 12-yard pass from Lamar Jackson, Blanton Creque kick (HOU 31–7)

Fourth quarter

- (14:51) LOU – Blanton Creque 26-yard field goal (HOU 31–10)
- (5:57) HOU – Ty Cummings 46-yard field goal (HOU 34–10)
- (3:55) HOU – Team Safety (HOU 36–10)

Top passers

- LOU – Lamar Jackson – 20/43, 211 yards, TD
- HOU – Greg Ward – 25/44, 233 yards, 2 TD

Top rushers

- LOU – Jeremy Smith – 6 carries, 49 yards
- HOU – Duke Catalon – 14 carries, 39 yards, TD

Top receivers

- LOU – Jaylen Smith – 3 receptions, 49 yards
- HOU – Chance Allen – 4 receptions, 105 yards, TD

=== At Memphis ===
#18 Houston Cougars at Memphis Tigers – Game summary

| Quarter | 1 | 2 | 3 | 4 | Total |
|---|---|---|---|---|---|
| #18 Houston | 10 | 7 | 10 | 17 | 44 |
| Memphis | 21 | 13 | 0 | 14 | 48 |

at Liberty Bowl Memorial Stadium • Memphis, TN

- Date: November 25, 2016
- Game time: 11:00 a.m. CST
- Game attendance: 36,527
- TV announcers (ABC): Tom Hart, Andre Ware, and Cole Cubelic

=== Vs. San Diego State (Las Vegas Bowl) ===
Houston Cougars vs San Diego State Aztecs – Game summary

| Quarter | 1 | 2 | 3 | 4 | Total |
|---|---|---|---|---|---|
| Houston | 10 | 0 | 0 | 0 | 10 |
| San Diego | 0 | 6 | 14 | 14 | 34 |

at Sam Boyd Stadium • Whitney, NV

- Date: December 17, 2016
- Game time: 2:30 p.m. CST
- Game attendance: 29,286
- Referee: Daniel Gautreaux
- TV announcers (ABC/SportsUSA): Brent Musburger, Jesse Palmer, and Kaylee Hartung/Eli Gold and Gary Barnett

Game information

First quarter

- (6:38) HOU – Ty Cummings 31-yard field goal (Drive: 10 plays, 24 yards, 3:31; Houston 3–0)
- (1:22) HOU – Greg Ward Jr. 2-yard run, Ty Cummings kick (Drive: 10 plays, 74 yards, 3:50; Houston 10–0)

Second quarter

- (6:28) SDSU – John Baron 23-yard field goal (Drive: 8 plays, 55 yards, 4:26; Houston 10–3)
- (1:29) SDSU – John Baron 28-yard field goal (Drive: 7 plays, 26 yards, 2:52; Houston 10–6)

Third quarter

- (3:14) SDSU – Donnel Pumphrey 32-yard run, John Baron kick (Drive: 4 plays, 68 yards, 1:54; San Diego State 13–10)
- (0:56) SDSU – Ron Smith 54-yard interception return, John Baron kick (San Diego State 20–10)

Fourth quarter

- (8:58) SDSU – Curtis Anderson 28-yard reception from Christian Chapman, John Baron kick (Drive: 1 play, 28 yards, 0:25; San Diego State 27–10)
- (1:11) SDSU – Juw Washington 7-yard run, John Baron kick (Drive: 4 plays, 21 yards, 1:46; San Diego State 34–10)

Top passers

- HOU – Greg Ward Jr. – 25/34, 229 yards, 4 INT
- SDSU – Christian Chapman – 10/14, 128 yards, TD

Top rushers

- HOU – Duke Catalon – 14 carries, 18 yards
- SDSU – Donnel Pumphrey – 19 carries, 115 yards, TD

Top receivers

- HOU – Brandon Wilson – 5 receptions, 52 yards
- SDSU – David Wells – 4 receptions, 33 yards

== Rankings ==
Ranking movements Legend: ██ Increase in ranking ██ Decrease in ranking — = Not ranked RV = Received votes
| | Week | | | | | | | | | | | | | | | |
| Poll | Pre | 1 | 2 | 3 | 4 | 5 | 6 | 7 | 8 | 9 | 10 | 11 | 12 | 13 | 14 | Final |
|---|---|---|---|---|---|---|---|---|---|---|---|---|---|---|---|---|
| AP | 15 | 6 | 6 | 6 | 6 | 6 | 13 | 11 | RV | RV | RV | RV | 18 | RV | RV | RV |
| Coaches | 13 | 7 | 7 | 7 | 7 | 5 | 12 | 11 | 24 | RV | RV | RV | 21 | RV | RV | — |
| CFP | Not released | | | | | | | | | — | — | — | 20 | 24 | — | Not released |
