= Miami Beach Bowl =

Former annual college football event in Miami, Florida

Miami Beach Bowl (defunct)
- The Battle of the Beach
- Stadium: Marlins Park
- Location: Miami, Florida
- Operated: 2014–2016
- Conference tie-ins: American Athletic Conference, Conference USA, Mid-American Conference, Sun Belt Conference
- Payout: US$1,000,000 (as of 2015)
- Succeeded by: Frisco Bowl

2016 matchup
- Central Michigan vs. Tulsa (Tulsa 55–10)

The Miami Beach Bowl was a National Collegiate Athletic Association (NCAA) sanctioned Division I Football Bowl Subdivision (FBS) college football bowl game played for three years (2014–2016) at Marlins Park in Miami, Florida. The bowl was created and owned by the American Athletic Conference ("The American").

On April 21, 2017, it was announced that the Miami Beach Bowl had been sold to ESPN, would relocate to Frisco, Texas, and would be played at Toyota Stadium for the 2017 season. The new bowl game is named the Frisco Bowl.

== Game results ==
Date	Winning team		Losing team		Attendance	Notes
December 22, 2014	Memphis	55	BYU	48	20,761	Notes
December 21, 2015	No. 25 Western Kentucky	45	South Florida	35	21,712	Notes
December 19, 2016	Tulsa	55	Central Michigan	10	15,262	Notes

== MVPs ==
Year	MVP	Team	Position
2014	Paxton Lynch	Memphis	QB
2015	Brandon Doughty	Western Kentucky	QB
2016	Dane Evans	Tulsa	QB

== Appearances by team ==
Rank	Team	Appearances	Record	Win %
T1	[[Memphis Tigers football|Memphis]]	1	1–0	1.000
T1	[[Tulsa Golden Hurricane football|Tulsa]]	1	1–0	1.000
T1	[[Western Kentucky Hilltoppers football|Western Kentucky]]	1	1–0	1.000
T1	[[BYU Cougars football|BYU]]	1	0–1	.000
T1	[[Central Michigan Chippewas football|Central Michigan]]	1	0–1	.000
T1	[[South Florida Bulls football|South Florida]]	1	0–1	.000

== Appearances by conference ==
Rank	Conference	Appearances	Record	Win %	# of Teams	Teams
1	The American	3	2–1	.667	3	Memphis (1–0); Tulsa (1–0); South Florida (0–1)
T2	Conference USA	1	1–0	1.000	1	Western Kentucky (1–0)
T2	Independent	1	0–1	.000	1	BYU (0–1)
T2	MAC	1	0–1	.000	1	Central Michigan (0–1)

== Media coverage ==
All three editions of the bowl were televised by ESPN.

In 2014, the Miami Beach Bowl didn't provide a national radio carrier. As a result, both local schools broadcasts were made available through the regular platforms. The only nationwide broadcast available was the Cougar IMG Sports Network simulcast on BYU Radio – nationwide on Sirius XM 143, Dish Network 980, and byuradio.org. In 2015, Touchdown Radio Productions picked up the rights to air the game nationwide. In 2016, the bowl was again broadcast only by local radio stations.

== See also ==
- List of college bowl games
