= Texas Kickoff =

College football game

- Stadium: NRG Stadium (2013–2016, 2018–2019, 2021); Mercedes-Benz Superdome (2017)
- Location: Houston, Texas (2013–2016, 2018–2019, 2021); New Orleans, Louisiana (2017)
- Operated: 2013–2016, 2018–2019, 2021

Sponsors
- AdvoCare (2013–2019); Good Sam (2021)

2021 matchup
- Texas Tech 38, Houston 21

The Texas Kickoff is an annual college football game played on the opening weekend of the college football season in Houston, Texas, at NRG Stadium. The game was sponsored by Advocare from 2013 to 2019 and known officially as the Advocare Texas Kickoff and by Good Sam in 2021 as the Good Sam Texas Kickoff. Due to flooding in Houston from Hurricane Harvey, the 2017 game was relocated to the Mercedes-Benz Superdome (now Caesars Superdome) in New Orleans where the Louisiana Kickoff has been held since 2022.

== Game results ==
Season	Date	Winners		Runners-up		Attendance	Television	TV Viewers	Source
2013	August 31	13 Oklahoma State	21	Mississippi State	3	35,874	ABC/ESPN2	2.162M	
2014	August 30	13 LSU	28	14 Wisconsin	24	71,599	ESPN	4.680M	
2015	September 5	Texas A&M	38	15 Arizona State	17	66,308	ESPN	2.471M	
2016	September 3	15 Houston	33	3 Oklahoma	23	71,016	ABC	5.713M	
2017	September 2	13 LSU	27	BYU	0	53,826	ESPN	1.763M	
2018	September 1	Ole Miss	47	Texas Tech	27	40,333	ESPN	1.929M	
2019	September 14	20 Washington State	31	Houston	24	40,523	ESPN	2.072M	
2020	Game cancelled due to COVID-19 pandemic. Originally Baylor v Ole Miss.								
2021	September 4	Texas Tech	38	Houston	21	43,478	ESPN	0.871M	

Rankings are from the AP Poll. TV viewers are from Sports Media Watch.

=== 2013 ===
The 2013 AdvoCare Texas Kickoff was the inaugural event in the series and matched the unranked Mississippi State Bulldogs of the Southeastern Conference (SEC) against the No. 13 Oklahoma State Cowboys of the Big 12 Conference on August 31, 2013, at Reliant Stadium in Houston, Texas. The Cowboys decisively defeated the Bulldogs 21–3.

=== 2014 ===
The second edition of the Kickoff featured the No. 14 Wisconsin Badgers of the Big Ten Conference and the No. 13 LSU Tigers of the Southeastern Conference (SEC) and was played on August 30, 2014, at NRG Stadium in Houston. This became official when school officials from the participating teams agreed to play in this kickoff classic on August 23, 2013. It was the third time the Badgers and Tigers met on the football field, with the Tigers prevailing 28–24.

=== 2015 ===
The 2015 matchup between Texas A&M of the Southeastern Conference (SEC) and Arizona State of the Pac-12 Conference was announced on November 22, 2013. Heading into the game, Texas A&M was unranked while Arizona State was ranked 15th in the preseason AP poll. The game was close through three quarters, with the Aggies outscoring the Sun Devils 21–3 in the fourth quarter to secure the win.

=== 2016 ===
The fourth edition of the Kickoff featured the No. 15 Houston Cougars of the American Athletic Conference and the No. 3 Oklahoma Sooners of the Big 12 Conference, and was played on September 3, 2016, at NRG Stadium in Houston. The game was publicly announced on September 8, 2014. At game time, Houston was under consideration for Big 12 membership along with several other schools. The Big 12 chose not to expand several weeks later after Houston beat Oklahoma 33–23. The Sooners went on to win the Big 12 title with a 9–0 conference record becoming the first Advocare Texas Kickoff participant to win its conference. The game featured a rare "kick six" as Houston defensive back Brandon Wilson returned a missed field goal 110 yards for a touchdown.

=== 2017 ===
On January 8, 2015, the Advocare Texas Kickoff announced that the LSU Tigers would face the BYU Cougars on September 2, 2017, at NRG Stadium. However, due to the tremendous flooding from Hurricane Harvey hitting the Houston metro area, the game was relocated to the Mercedes-Benz Superdome in New Orleans, Louisiana. The Tigers shut out the Cougars 27–0.

=== 2020 ===
The 2020 game was cancelled due to the COVID-19 pandemic. The game was to be played between Baylor of the Big 12 Conference and Ole Miss from the SEC.

=== 2021 ===
The 2021 game was between Texas Tech of the Big 12 Conference and Houston of the American Athletic Conference. Texas Tech won the game 38–21 after being down 7–21 at halftime.

== Future Games ==
Season	Date	Matchup	
2027	TBA	LSU	Houston

== Records ==
=== By team ===
Rank	Team	Apps	Record	Win %
1	LSU	2	2–0	1.000
2	Oklahoma State	1	1–0	1.000
2	Ole Miss	1	1–0	1.000
2	Texas A&M	1	1–0	1.000
2	Washington State	1	1–0	1.000
6	Texas Tech	2	1–1	.500
7	Houston	3	1–2	.333
8	Arizona State	1	0–1	.000
8	BYU	1	0–1	.000
8	Mississippi State	1	0–1	.000
8	Oklahoma	1	0–1	.000
8	Wisconsin	1	0–1	.000

=== By conference ===
Rank	Conference	Apps	Record	Win %
1	SEC	5	4–1	.800
2	Pac-12	2	1–1	.500
2	Big 12	4	2–2	.500
3	American	3	1–2	.333
5	Big Ten	1	0–1	.000
