= 2016 Miami Beach Bowl =

- 3rd Miami Beach Bowl
Central Michigan Chippewas	Tulsa Golden Hurricane
(6–6)	(9–3)
MAC	The American
10	55
Head coach: John Bonamego	Head coach: Philip Montgomery
	1	2	3	4	Total
Central Michigan	3	0	0	7	10
Tulsa	10	17	21	7	55
- Date: December 19, 2016
- Season: 2016
- Stadium: Marlins Park
- Location: Miami, Florida
- MVP: Tulsa QB Dane Evans
- Favorite: Tulsa by 12
- National anthem: Miami Beach Senior High School Chorus
- Referee: Marvel July (MWC)
- Attendance: 15,262
- Payout: US$1,000,000

United States TV coverage
- Network: ESPN
- Announcers: Allen Bestwick, Mike Bellotti, Kris Budden

The 2016 Miami Beach Bowl was a post-season American college football bowl game played on December 19, 2016 at Marlins Park in Miami, Florida. The third annual edition of the Miami Beach Bowl was one of the 2016–17 bowl games concluding the 2016 FBS football season.

== Team selection ==
The game featured the Central Michigan Chippewas against the Tulsa Golden Hurricane.

This was the third meeting between the schools, with the all-time series tied 1–1. The most recent meeting was on October 17, 1987, where the Chippewas defeated the Golden Hurricane by a score of 51–21.

== Game summary ==
=== Scoring summary ===
Scoring summary

Quarter	Time	Drive			Team	Scoring information	Score	
Quarter	Time	Plays	Yards	TOP	Team	Scoring information	CMU	Tulsa
1	7:24	17	93	5:29	Tulsa	Josh Atkinson 5-yard touchdown reception from Dane Evans, Redford Jones kick good	0	7
1	2:55	7	46	2:10	Tulsa	46-yard field goal by Redford Jones	0	10
1	0:55	6	70	2:00	CMU	26-yard field goal by Brian Eavey	3	10
2	12:18	11	41	3:37	Tulsa	44-yard field goal by Redford Jones	3	13
2	4:03	8	80	2:43	Tulsa	Keevan Lucas 13-yard touchdown reception from Dane Evans, Redford Jones kick good	3	20
2	0:59	9	62	1:55	Tulsa	Chris Minter 4-yard touchdown reception from Dane Evans, Redford Jones kick good	3	27
3	9:50	5	56	1:44	Tulsa	James Flanders 17-yard touchdown run, Redford Jones kick good	3	34
3	6:53	5	62	1:10	Tulsa	Keevan Lucas 28-yard touchdown reception from Dane Evans, Redford Jones kick good	3	41
3	2:16	10	69	3:05	Tulsa	Keevan Lucas 11-yard touchdown reception from Dane Evans, Redford Jones kick good	3	48
4	12:49				Tulsa	Interception returned 66 yards for touchdown by Jesse Brubaker, Redford Jones kick good	3	55
4	9:21	6	73	3:28	CMU	Jahray Hayes 13-yard touchdown run, Brian Eavey kick good	10	55
"TOP" = time of possession. For other American football terms, see Glossary of American football.							10	55

=== Statistics ===
Statistics	CMU	Tulsa
First downs	19	34
Plays–yards	72–355	85–581
Rushes–yards	22–83 (3.8)	46–261 (5.7)
Passing yards	272	320
Passing: Comp–Att–Int	25–50–3	29–39–0
Time of possession	30:52	29:08

Team	Category	Player	Statistics
CMU	Passing	Cooper Rush	24/49, 241 yds, 3 INT
CMU	Rushing	Mark Chapman	2 car, 38 yds
CMU	Receiving	Devon Spalding	5 rec, 26 yds
Tulsa	Passing	Dane Evans	28/38, 304 yds, 5 TD
Tulsa	Rushing	D'Angelo Brewer	17 car, 105 yds
Tulsa	Receiving	Josh Atkinson	12 rec, 131 yds, 1 TD
