= 2016 Las Vegas Bowl =

2016 Las Vegas Bowl presented by GEICO
- 25th Las Vegas Bowl
Houston Cougars	San Diego State Aztecs
(9–3)	(10–3)
The American	Mountain West
10	34
Head coach: Major Applewhite (interim)	Head coach: Rocky Long
	1	2	3	4	Total
Houston	10	0	0	0	10
San Diego State	0	6	14	14	34
- Date: December 17, 2016
- Season: 2016
- Stadium: Sam Boyd Stadium
- Location: Whitney, Nevada
- MVP: San Diego State RB Donnel Pumphrey
- Favorite: Houston by 3.5
- Referee: Daniel Gautreaux (C-USA)
- Attendance: 29,286
- Payout: US$1,350,000

United States TV coverage
- Network: ABC; Sports USA
- Announcers: Brent Musburger, Jesse Palmer, Kaylee Hartung (ABC); Eli Gold, Gary Barnett (Sports USA)

The 2016 Las Vegas Bowl was a college football bowl game that was played on December 17, 2016, at Sam Boyd Stadium in Whitney, Nevada. The 25th annual Las Vegas Bowl was one of the 2016–17 bowl games concluding the 2016 FBS football season. The game aired on ABC. Through sponsorship from GEICO, the game was officially known as the Las Vegas Bowl presented by GEICO.

== Team selection ==
The game would have featured teams from the Mountain West Conference and Pac-12 Conference. However, since the Pac-12 had only six bowl-eligible teams, and two of them qualified for New Years Six bowls, the sixth-place Pac-12 team was unavailable. Instead, the bowl elected to invite the Houston Cougars of the American Athletic Conference. This was the first time an AAC team played in the Las Vegas Bowl. The representative from the Mountain West was San Diego State, which qualified for the bowl by winning the 2016 Mountain West Conference Football Championship Game. Houston played in its first-ever Las Vegas Bowl, while San Diego State appeared for a second time, the first being a 1998 loss to North Carolina.

This was the third meeting between the schools, with Houston having won both previous ones. The most recent prior meeting was on October 6, 1973, when the Cougars defeated the Aztecs by a score of 14–9.

== Game summary ==
On the fourth drive of the game, Houston capped a 10-play, 24-yard drive with a 31-yard field goal by Ty Cummings. After a three-and-out by San Diego State, Houston went on a 10-play, 74-yard touchdown drive. Greg Ward, Jr.'s 2-yard run put the Cougars up 10–0 to finish the 1st quarter. San Diego State responded with 34 unanswered points, leading to a 34–10 win by the Aztecs.

On the first play of the Aztecs' first drive in the 4th quarter, Donnel Pumphrey broke the all-time FBS career record for rushing yardage.

=== Scoring summary ===
Scoring summary

Quarter	Time	Drive			Team	Scoring information	Score	
Quarter	Time	Plays	Yards	TOP	Team	Scoring information	UH	SDSU
1	6:38	10	24	3:31	UH	31-yard field goal by Ty Cummings	3	0
1	1:22	10	74	3:50	UH	Greg Ward Jr. 2-yard touchdown run, Ty Cummings kick good	10	0
2	6:28	8	55	4:26	SDSU	23-yard field goal by John Baron	10	3
2	1:29	7	26	2:52	SDSU	28-yard field goal by John Baron	10	6
3	3:14	4	68	1:54	SDSU	Donnel Pumphrey 32-yard touchdown run, John Baron kick good	10	13
3	0:56				SDSU	Interception returned 54 yards for touchdown by Ron Smith, John Baron kick good	10	20
4	8:58	1	28	0:25	SDSU	Curtis Anderson 28-yard touchdown reception from Christian Chapman, John Baron kick good	10	27
4	1:11	4	21	1:46	SDSU	Juw Washington 7-yard touchdown run, John Baron kick good	10	34
"TOP" = time of possession. For other American football terms, see Glossary of American football.							10	34

=== Statistics ===
Statistics	HOU	SDSU
First downs	16	13
Plays–yards	75–254	51–255
Rushes–yards	41–25 (0.6)	37–127 (3.4)
Passing yards	229	128
Passing: Comp–Att–Int	25–34–4	10–14–0
Time of possession	32:12	27:48

Category	Team	Player	Statistics
Passing	HOU	Greg Ward, Jr.	25/34, 229 yds, 4 INT
Passing	SDSU	Christian Chapman	10/14, 128 yds, 1 TD
Rushing	HOU	Duke Catalon	14 car, 18 yds
Rushing	SDSU	Donnel Pumphrey	19 car, 115 yds, 1 TD
Receiving	HOU	Brandon Wilson	5 rec, 52 yds
Receiving	SDSU	David Wells	4 rec, 33 yds
