= Major Applewhite =

American football player and coach (born 1978)

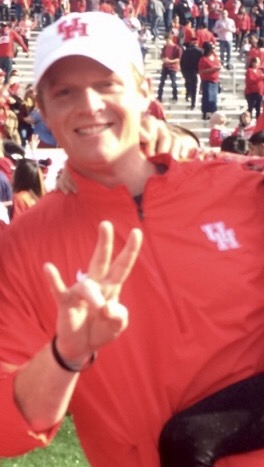
- Applewhite at the 2015 American Athletic Conference Championship Game

Current position
- Title: Head coach
- Team: South Alabama
- Conference: Sun Belt
- Record: 17–19

Biographical details
- Born: July 26, 1978 (age 48); Baton Rouge, Louisiana, U.S.
- Education: Baton Rouge (LA) Catholic

Playing career
- 1998–2001: Texas
- Position: Quarterback

Coaching career (HC unless noted)
- 2003–2004: Texas (GA)
- 2005: Syracuse (QB)
- 2006: Rice (OC/QB)
- 2007: Alabama (OC/QB)
- 2008–2010: Texas (AHC/RB)
- 2011–2012: Texas (co-OC/RB)
- 2013: Texas (co-OC/QB)
- 2015–2016: Houston (OC/QB)
- 2016–2018: Houston
- 2019–2020: Alabama (analyst)
- 2021–2023: South Alabama (OC/QB)
- 2024–present: South Alabama

Head coaching record
- Overall: 32–30
- Bowls: 1–3

Accomplishments and honors

Championships
- AAC West Division (2018)

Awards
- Big 12 Offensive Freshman of the Year (1998); Big 12 Co-Offensive Player of the Year (1999); First-team All-Big 12 (1999); Second-team All-Big 12 (1998)

Major Lee Applewhite (born July 26, 1978) is an American college football coach and former player. He is the head football coach for the University of South Alabama, a position he has held since 2024. Prior to that he was the head coach at the University of Houston from 2017 to 2018, where he previously served as the offensive coordinator and quarterbacks coach. He started his coaching career in 2003 and in addition to South Alabama and Houston he has held various positions at Texas, Syracuse, Rice and Alabama.

As a player he played college football for the Texas Longhorns where he shared quarterback duties with Chris Simms from 1998 to 2001 earning All-Big 12 honors, was named the Big 12 Co-Offensive Player of the Year and Offensive Freshman of the year and set eight school records. Many of these still stand, including the longest pass play (97 yards), and most yards passing in a game (473). He previously held the record for career yards (8,353) and consecutive passes without an interception (156).

== Playing career ==
Applewhite was a quarterback for the Texas Longhorns from 1998 to 2001. Recruited from Catholic High School in Baton Rouge, Louisiana by then Texas coach John Mackovic, he was later coached by Mack Brown. While at Texas, the undersized Applewhite's tenure was noted both for his often gritty heroics as well as his battle for playing time with the heralded blue chip recruit Chris Simms, son of New York Giants legend Phil Simms. Applewhite led Texas to two Big 12 Championship games, to victory in 2 Bowl games, and set 48 school records along the way.

After redshirting the 1997 season, an injury to starting quarterback Richard Walton catapulted Applewhite into the starting job two games into his redshirt freshman season in 1998. Applewhite went 8–2 as a starter, including upsets of #7 Nebraska 20–16, which broke the Cornhuskers' 47-home game winning streak, and #6 Texas A&M. In a blowout victory over Oklahoma, Applewhite threw a 97-yard touchdown pass to Wane McGarity, the longest pass in Texas history. He capped the season by leading the Longhorns to a 38–11 victory over the Mississippi State Bulldogs in the Cotton Bowl Classic. It was Texas' first Cotton Bowl victory since 1982.

In 1999, Applewhite started almost every game, leading Texas to a 9–4 record, a Big 12 South Championship and the Cotton Bowl. Going into the Texas A&M game (often referred to as the Bonfire Game, as it followed the death of 12 students during construction of A&M's annual bonfire). Texas was ranked #5, but after Applewhite and backup quarterback Chris Simms were unable to produce, Texas fell behind. It was during the last six minutes when Applewhite fumbled on their last possession losing the game for the Longhorns. That was followed by losses to Nebraska in the Big 12 Championship Game and to Arkansas in the Cotton Bowl. Applewhite suffered a knee injury in the 4th quarter of the Cotton Bowl and was replaced by Simms.

The next season Applewhite was again the starter, but after a loss to Stanford in the second game, Simms was given the start the following game against Houston. Simms struggled early and Applewhite got the majority of the snaps in what turned out to be a rout, thus regaining the starting job. He lost it again following a season-ending knee injury in the Texas Tech game. At that point Texas was 7–2 and ranked #19. Texas went 2–1 with Simms as quarterback, and Mack Brown was impressed enough to name Simms the starter before spring practice began.

Applewhite was the backup for Simms for the entirety of the 2001 regular season and Simms led Texas to a #3 ranking and a trip to the Big 12 Championship against #10 Colorado. But in that game Applewhite got the opportunity to go out as a starter and a hero. Because of an upset loss by Florida earlier in the day, Texas went into that game knowing that a win would put them in the BCS Championship Game. But Simms had a disastrous game and was responsible for four turnovers (three interceptions and a fumble) in the first half of play. Meanwhile, Major was seen attempting to rally the offense before they took to the field, even as the restless Texas fans booed Simms. Two plays later, Simms injured his finger and Applewhite entered the game with Texas down 29–10. His second pass was completed for a 79-yard touchdown and he baited the University of Colorado bench in an attempt to rally the Texas fans. He led Texas back to within two points, but eventually Texas would come up short losing 39–37 after an onside kick attempt failed.

His near miracle comeback, combined with Simms' injury, earned him the starting position for his final game at Texas, the 2001 Holiday Bowl and he didn't disappoint. In perhaps his finest game, he led Texas from behind three times throwing for a school record 473 yards and four touchdowns. In a fourth quarter aerial assault, Texas scored 23 points in a little over 10 minutes to take the lead, but Washington came back to take the lead once more. With 1:49 left in the game, Applewhite engineered a 7-play, 80-yard touchdown drive with passes of 25 and 37 yards to win the game. Applewhite was named the Holiday Bowl MVP as a result. He finished with a record as a starter of 22–8.

Applewhite played in the 2001 Hula Bowl.

After graduation, Applewhite was signed by the New England Patriots days after the 2002 NFL draft, but quit prior to the start of camp to finish his degree and to pursue a career in coaching.

== Coaching career ==
Returning to Texas as a graduate assistant, Applewhite served in that position until early 2005 when he was offered the position of quarterbacks coach at Syracuse University by new head coach Greg Robinson, Texas' former defensive coordinator. Applewhite's first coaching job was a disaster, with the Orange going 1–10, their worst record in school history (after 6-6 the year before) and scoring their fewest points in more than 20 years (from 22.8 points in 2004 to 13.8 points in 2005). On January 8, 2006, after one year at Syracuse, Rice University named Applewhite offensive coordinator and quarterbacks coach under new head coach Todd Graham. Graham said of Applewhite's expected contribution to the new staff, "We want to spread the field and throw the football, and every quarterback and receiver in this state will be interested in Rice with Major as our offensive coordinator." At Rice, Applewhite moved the team away from the wishbone offense and moved them to a more modern, one-running-back formation similar to that used by Texas. During his one season at Rice, the team posted a 7–6 record and attended its first bowl game in over forty years.

After former Texas defensive coordinator Gene Chizik was hired as head coach at Iowa State University in December 2006, Applewhite was rumored to be joining his coaching staff. Applewhite, however, officially announced on December 4, 2006, that he would not leave Rice for Iowa State. He did however leave Rice only a month later, not for Iowa State but for Alabama, as he accepted an offer by newly hired Crimson Tide head coach Nick Saban to serve as the offensive coordinator. Given his ties to the Lone Star State, Applewhite targeted a couple of Texas high school prospects, including Lennon Creer. Alabama eventually received commitments by quarterback Nick Fanuzzi and defensive back Tarence Farmer.

In his first season at Alabama, Applewhite improved the Crimson Tide offense, which had averaged 22.3 points and 340.9 total yards per game under Dave Rader in 2006, to an average of 26.8 points and 372.6 total yards per game in 2007. Following a 41–17 blowout win over SEC rival Tennessee on October 20, Applewhite was named "Offensive Coordinator of the Week." Alabama, however, then lost the last four games of the season, including a shocking 21–14 loss to Louisiana-Monroe.

During the 2007 season, Applewhite was mentioned as a possible replacement for Art Briles as head coach at the University of Houston. Briles had left Houston for Baylor University. Applewhite, however, withdrew his name from the candidates list.

On January 16, 2008, Applewhite accepted an offer to become running backs coach at the University of Texas and he also served as assistant head coach to Mack Brown. Applewhite was announced as the co-offensive coordinator on January 6, 2011. The next day, Mack Brown announced that the primary play caller and other co-offensive coordinator would be Bryan Harsin from Boise State. Harsin was named head coach at Arkansas State University on December 12, 2012, and Applewhite assumed play calling duties at Texas and coached quarterbacks. He was co-offensive coordinator with wide receivers coach Darrell Wyatt.

At the start of 2014, following the hiring of new Texas head coach Charlie Strong, Applewhite accepted a one-year severance package and resigned as offensive coordinator with Texas.

=== Houston ===
On January 8, 2015, Applewhite was hired by the University of Houston to be the offensive coordinator and quarterbacks coach under new head coach Tom Herman for the Houston Cougars football program.

On December 9, 2016, Applewhite was promoted to head coach, becoming the 14th to hold the job for the program. After going 0–3 in bowl games and losing 70–14 against Army, he was fired on December 30, 2018.

=== Post–Houston ===
After his termination, Applewhite returned to Alabama as an analyst.

On December 21, 2020, Applewhite was hired as offensive coordinator and quarterbacks coach for the South Alabama Jaguars. He had initially been hired for the same positions at Arkansas State, but elected to join South Alabama.

=== South Alabama ===
After Kane Wommack took the defensive coordinator job at Alabama, Applewhite was elevated to head coach after three seasons as offensive coordinator.

== Personal life ==
In early 2013, Applewhite admitted he was disciplined by the University of Texas for "having an inappropriate relationship with a student at the 2009 Fiesta Bowl." The student was employed by the football team as an athletic trainer. Texas athletic director DeLoss Dodds reprimanded Applewhite by freezing his salary and requiring him to undergo counseling. In a public statement Applewhite commented on the affair: "Several years ago, I made a regretful decision resulting in behavior that was totally inappropriate. It was a one-time occurrence and was a personal matter. ... Through counsel I have worked with my wife and the incident is behind us. I am regretful for my mistake and humbled by this experience. I am deeply sorry for the embarrassment it has caused my friends, family, and the University." The revelation occurred in the wake of investigation into Texas track coach Beverly Kearney's relationship with a student athlete.

== Head coaching record ==
Year	Team	Overall	Conference	Standing	Bowl/playoffs
Houston Cougars (American Athletic Conference) (2016–2018)
2016	Houston	0–1			L Las Vegas
2017	Houston	7–5	5–3	2nd (West)	L Hawaii
2018	Houston	8–5	5–3	T–1st (West)	L Armed Forces
Houston:		15–11	10–6		
South Alabama Jaguars (Sun Belt Conference) (2024–present)
2024	South Alabama	7–6	5–3	T–2nd (West)	W Salute to Veterans
2025	South Alabama	4–8	3–5	T–5th (West)	
2026	South Alabama	6–5	4–3	(West)	
South Alabama:		17–19	12–11		
Total:		32–30			
National championship Conference title Conference division title or championship game berth
