= 2016 Tulsa Golden Hurricane football team =

American college football season

2016 Tulsa Golden Hurricane football

Miami Beach Bowl champion

Miami Beach Bowl, W 55–10 vs. Central Michigan
- Conference: American Athletic Conference
- West Division
- Record: 10–3 (6–2 AAC)
- Head coach: Philip Montgomery (2nd season)
- Offensive coordinator: Philip Montgomery (1st season)
- Offensive scheme: Veer and shoot
- Co-defensive coordinators: Brian Norwood (2nd season); Bill Young (4th season)
- Base defense: 4–3
- Home stadium: Skelly Field at H. A. Chapman Stadium

2016 American Athletic Conference football standings
| | Conf. | | | Overall |
| Team | W | | L | W | | L |
|---|---|---|---|---|---|---|
East Division
| Temple xy$ | 7 | – | 1 | 10 | – | 4 |
| No. 19 South Florida x | 7 | – | 1 | 11 | – | 2 |
| UCF | 4 | – | 4 | 6 | – | 7 |
| Cincinnati | 1 | – | 7 | 4 | – | 8 |
| UConn | 1 | – | 7 | 3 | – | 9 |
| East Carolina | 1 | – | 7 | 3 | – | 9 |
West Division
| Navy xy | 7 | – | 1 | 9 | – | 5 |
| Tulsa | 6 | – | 2 | 10 | – | 3 |
| Memphis | 5 | – | 3 | 8 | – | 5 |
| Houston | 5 | – | 3 | 9 | – | 4 |
| SMU | 3 | – | 5 | 5 | – | 7 |
| Tulane | 1 | – | 7 | 4 | – | 8 |
Championship: Temple 34, Navy 10
$ – Conference champion; x – Division champion/co-champions; y – Championship game participant; Rankings from AP Poll

The 2016 Tulsa Golden Hurricane football team represented the University of Tulsa in the 2016 NCAA Division I FBS football season. The Golden Hurricane played their home games at Skelly Field at H. A. Chapman Stadium in Tulsa, Oklahoma, and competed in the West Division of American Athletic Conference (AAC). They were led by second-year head coach Philip Montgomery. They finished the season 10–3, 6–2 in America Athletic play to finish in second place in the West Division. They were invited to the Miami Beach Bowl where they defeated Central Michigan.

== Before the season ==
=== Transfers out / departures ===
QB Jabe Burgess transferred to Mississippi Gulf Coast Community College in January 2016. RB Kyle McLaughlin transferred to Missouri Southern. OT Mildren Montgomery transferred to Texas Southern. WR Blake Kitrell transferred to Washburn. DB J. R. Reed transferred to Georgia.

== Schedule ==
Tulsa announced its 2016 football schedule on February 9, 2016. The 2016 schedule consists of 6 home and away games in the regular season. The Golden Hurricane will host AAC foes Cincinnati, East Carolina, SMU, and Tulane, and will travel to Houston, Memphis, Navy, and Central Florida (UCF).

The team will play four non–conference games, two of which are home games against North Carolina A&T from the Mid-Eastern Athletic Conference and San Jose State from the Mountain West Conference, and two road game against Fresno State from the Mountain West Conference and travel to Ohio State.

| Date | Time | Opponent | Site | TV | Result | Attendance |
|---|---|---|---|---|---|---|
| September 3 | 6:00 p.m. | San Jose State* | Skelly Field at H. A. Chapman Stadium; Tulsa, OK | CBSSN | W 45–10 | 18,748 |
| September 10 | 2:30 p.m. | at No. 4 Ohio State* | Ohio Stadium; Columbus, OH | ABC | L 3–48 | 104,410 |
| September 17 | 1:00 p.m. | No. 18 (FCS) North Carolina A&T* | Skelly Field at H. A. Chapman Stadium; Tulsa, OK | ESPN3 | W 58–21 | 16,111 |
| September 24 | 3:30 p.m. | at Fresno State* | Bulldog Stadium; Fresno, CA | MW Net/Twitter | W 48–41 ^{2OT} | 23,273 |
| October 7 | 7:00 p.m. | SMU | Skelly Field at H. A. Chapman Stadium; Tulsa, OK | ESPN2 | W 43–40 ^{OT} | 20,089 |
| October 15 | 7:00 p.m. | at No. 13 Houston | TDECU Stadium; Houston, TX | ESPN2 | L 31–38 | 38,221 |
| October 22 | 2:45 p.m. | Tulane^{†} | Chapman Stadium; Tulsa, OK | ESPNU | W 50–27 | 22,349 |
| October 29 | 7:00 p.m. | at Memphis | Liberty Bowl Memorial Stadium; Memphis, TN | ESPNews | W 59–30 | 36,894 |
| November 5 | 7:00 p.m. | East Carolina | Skelly Field at H. A. Chapman Stadium; Tulsa, OK | ESPNews | W 45–24 | 17,557 |
| November 12 | 11:00 a.m. | at Navy | Navy–Marine Corps Memorial Stadium; Annapolis, MD | CBSSN | L 40–42 | 36,397 |
| November 19 | 7:00 p.m. | at UCF | Bright House Networks Stadium; Orlando, FL | ESPNews | W 35–20 | 35,141 |
| November 25 | 7:30 p.m. | Cincinnati | Skelly Field at H. A. Chapman Stadium; Tulsa, OK | ESPN2 | W 40–37 ^{OT} | 18,550 |
| December 19 | 1:30 p.m. | vs. Central Michigan* | Marlins Park; Miami, FL (Miami Beach Bowl) | ESPN | W 55–10 | 15,262 |
*Non-conference game; ^{†}Homecoming; Rankings from AP Poll released prior to the game; All times are in Central time

== Game summaries ==
=== San Jose State ===
| Team | 1 | 2 | 3 | 4 | Total |
|---|---|---|---|---|---|
| Spartans | 7 | 0 | 0 | 3 | 10 |
| • Golden Hurricane | 24 | 14 | 7 | 0 | 45 |

- TV announcers: Carter Blackburn, Aaron Taylor, Jenny Dell

Scoring summary
| 1 | 12:02 | TU | D'Angelo Brewer 38-yard run (Redford Jones kick) | TU 7–0 |
| 1 | 4:49 | SJSU | Rahshead Johnson 64-yard pass from Kenny Potter (Bryce Crawford kick) | Tied 7–7 |
| 1 | 2:46 | TU | Jones 34-yard field goal | TU 10–7 |
| 1 | 0:16 | TU | Brewer 5-yard run (Jones kick) | TU 17–7 |
| 1 | 0:08 | TU | Jesse Brubaker 24-yard Interception return (Jones kick) | TU 24–7 |
| 2 | 8:06 | TU | Justin Hobbs 11-yard pass from Dane Evans (Jones kick) | TU 31–7 |
| 2 | 4:37 | TU | McKinley Whitfield 0-yard fumble return (Jones kick) | TU 38–7 |
| 3 | 11:20 | TU | Brewer 2-yard run (Jones kick) | TU 45–7 |
| 4 | 14:03 | SJSU | Crawford 36-yard field goal | TU 45–10 |

=== At Ohio State ===
| Team | 1 | 2 | 3 | 4 | Total |
|---|---|---|---|---|---|
| Golden Hurricane | 3 | 0 | 0 | 0 | 3 |
| • No. 4 Buckeyes | 3 | 17 | 14 | 14 | 48 |

- TV announcers: Dave Pasch, Greg McElroy, Tom Luginbill

Scoring summary
| 1 | 13:23 | OSU | Tyler Durbin 29-yard field goal | OSU 3–0 |
| 1 | 3:22 | TU | Redford Jones 37-yard field goal | Tied 3–3 |
| 2 | 10:10 | OSU | Durbin 22-yard field goal | OSU 6–3 |
| 2 | 3:02 | OSU | Malik Hooker 26-yard Interception return (Durbin kick) | OSU 13–3 |
| 2 | 0:33 | OSU | Marshon Lattimore 40-yard Interception return (Durbin kick) | OSU 20–3 |
| 3 | 9:42 | OSU | J. T. Barrett 11-yard run (Durbin kick) | OSU 27–3 |
| 3 | 0:47 | OSU | Mike Weber 1-yard run (Durbin kick) | OSU 34–3 |
| 4 | 11:15 | OSU | Barrett 5-yard run (Durbin kick) | OSU 41–3 |
| 4 | 5:58 | OSU | Dontre Wilson 5-yard run (Durbin kick) | OSU 48–3 |

=== North Carolina A&T ===
| Team | 1 | 2 | 3 | 4 | Total |
|---|---|---|---|---|---|
| No. 18 (FCS) Aggies | 0 | 0 | 7 | 14 | 21 |
| • Golden Hurricane | 24 | 24 | 10 | 0 | 58 |

- TV announcers: Drew Fellios, Watson Brown

Scoring summary
| 1 | 9:53 | TU | Redford Jones 25-yard field goal | TU 3–0 |
| 1 | 9:01 | TU | James Flanders 1-yard run (Jones kick) | TU 10–0 |
| 1 | 2:35 | TU | Kolton Shindelar 65-yard Interception return (Jones kick) | TU 17–0 |
| 1 | 1:04 | TU | Keevan Lucas 51-yard pass from Dane Evans (Jones kick) | TU 24–0 |
| 2 | 11:14 | TU | Lucas 13-yard pass from Evans (Jones kick) | TU 31–0 |
| 2 | 6:56 | TU | Flanders 21-yard run (Jones kick) | TU 38–0 |
| 2 | 4:02 | TU | Lucas 52-yard pass from Evans (Jones kick) | TU 45–0 |
| 2 | 0:59 | TU | Jones 28-yard field goal | TU 48–0 |
| 3 | 13:12 | TU | Jones 33-yard field goal | TU 51–0 |
| 3 | 2:46 | TU | Rob Riederer 9-yard pass from Ryan Rubley (Jones kick) | TU 58–0 |
| 3 | 1:19 | NCAT | Malik Wilson 75-yard pass from Isaiah Hicklin (Cody Jones kick) | TU 58–7 |
| 4 | 8:22 | NCAT | Elijah Bell 32-yard pass from Lamar Raynard (Jones kick) | TU 58–14 |
| 4 | 0:22 | NCAT | Raynard 10-yard run (Jones kick) | TU 58–21 |

=== At Fresno State ===
| Team | 1 | 2 | 3 | 4 | OT | 2OT | Total |
|---|---|---|---|---|---|---|---|
| • Golden Hurricane | 0 | 21 | 7 | 13 | 0 | 7 | 48 |
| Bulldogs | 21 | 10 | 3 | 7 | 0 | 0 | 41 |

- TV announcers: Ari Wolfe, Darius Walker

Scoring summary
| 1 | 13:24 | FS | Jamire Jordan 44-yard run (Kody Kroening kick) | FS 7–0 |
| 1 | 9:47 | FS | Chason Virgil 14-yard run (Kroening kick) | FS 14–0 |
| 1 | 4:01 | FS | Dontel James 2-yard run (Kroening kick) | FS 21–0 |
| 2 | 11:41 | FS | Kroening 25-yard field goal | FS 24–0 |
| 2 | 10:16 | FS | Jordan 65-yard pass from Virgil (Kroening kick) | FS 31–0 |
| 2 | 8:52 | TU | Justin Hobbs 23-yard pass from Dane Evans (Redford Jones kick) | FS 31–7 |
| 2 | 6:48 | TU | Keevan Lucas 40-yard pass from Evans (Jones kick) | FS 31–14 |
| 2 | 4:19 | TU | Lucas 40-yard pass from Evans (Jones kick) | FS 31–21 |
| 3 | 8:12 | FS | Kroening 25-yard field goal | FS 34–21 |
| 3 | 4:59 | TU | Josh Atkinson 24-yard pass from Evans (Jones kick) | FS 34–28 |
| 4 | 13:38 | TU | James Flanders 2-yard run (Jones kick) | TU 35–34 |
| 4 | 8:20 | TU | Jones 37-yard field goal | TU 38–34 |
| 4 | 5:02 | FS | Virgil 1-yard run (Kroening kick) | FS 41–38 |
| 4 | 1:09 | TU | Jones 28-yard field goal | Tied 41–41 |
| 2OT | | TU | Evans 18-yard run (Jones kick) | TU 48–41 |

=== SMU ===
| Team | 1 | 2 | 3 | 4 | OT | Total |
|---|---|---|---|---|---|---|
| Mustangs | 14 | 6 | 7 | 10 | 3 | 40 |
| • Golden Hurricane | 10 | 13 | 7 | 7 | 6 | 43 |

- TV announcers: Mike Corey, Rene Ingoglia

Scoring summary
| 1 | 13:19 | SMU | Ke'Mon Freeman 2-yard run (Josh Williams kick) | SMU 7–0 |
| 1 | 5:21 | TU | Redford Jones 24-yard field goal | SMU 7–3 |
| 1 | 3:20 | SMU | Alex Honey 45-yard pass from Ben Hicks (Williams kick) | SMU 14–3 |
| 1 | 3:02 | TU | James Flanders 61-yard run (Jones kick) | SMU 14–10 |
| 2 | 14:51 | SMU | Williams 39-yard field goal | SMU 17–10 |
| 2 | 9:49 | TU | Jones 43-yard field goal | SMU 17–13 |
| 2 | 5:57 | SMU | Williams 44-yard field goal | SMU 20–13 |
| 2 | 3:48 | TU | Jones 33-yard field goal | SMU 20–16 |
| 2 | 1:07 | TU | Raymond Taylor 2-yard run (Jones kick) | TU 23–20 |
| 3 | 13:58 | SMU | Jeremiah Gaines 19-yard pass from Hicks (Williams kick) | SMU 27–23 |
| 3 | 10:50 | TU | Josh Atkinson 11-yard pass from Dane Evans (Jones kick) | TU 30–27 |
| 4 | 8:31 | SMU | Braeden West 4-yard run (Williams kick) | SMU 34–30 |
| 4 | 5:32 | TU | D'Angelo Brewer 35-yard run (Jones kick) | TU 37–34 |
| 4 | 0:00 | SMU | Williams 25-yard field goal | Tied 37–37 |
| OT | | SMU | Williams 22-yard field goal | SMU 40–37 |
| OT | | TU | Evans 14-yard run | TU 43–40 |

=== At Houston ===
| Team | 1 | 2 | 3 | 4 | Total |
|---|---|---|---|---|---|
| Golden Hurricane | 3 | 14 | 0 | 14 | 31 |
| • No. 13 Cougars | 10 | 7 | 7 | 14 | 38 |

- TV announcers: Jason Benetti, Kelly Stouffer, Paul Carcaterra

Scoring summary
| 1 | 12:37 | UH | Dillon Birden 17-yard run (Ty Cummings kick) | UH 7–0 |
| 1 | 7:27 | TU | Redford Jones 32-yard field goal | UH 7–3 |
| 1 | 1:54 | UH | Cummings 33-yard field goal | UH 10–3 |
| 2 | 11:07 | UH | Mulbah Car 6-yard run (Cummings kick) | UH 17–3 |
| 2 | 2:55 | TU | Corey Taylor II 2-yard run (Jones kick) | UH 17–10 |
| 2 | 0:13 | TU | Dane Evans 1-yard run (Jones kick) | Tied 17–17 |
| 3 | 2:57 | UH | Birden 6-yard run (Cummings kick) | UH 24–17 |
| 4 | 8:29 | UH | Birden 8-yard run (Cummings kick) | UH 31–17 |
| 4 | 7:03 | TU | Justin Hobbs 38-yard pass from Evans (Jones kick) | UH 31–24 |
| 4 | 3:31 | TU | James Flanders 3-yard run (Jones kick) | Tied 31–31 |
| 4 | 1:21 | UH | Emeke Egbule 24-yard fumble return (Cummings kick) | UH 38–31 |

=== Tulane ===
| Team | 1 | 2 | 3 | 4 | Total |
|---|---|---|---|---|---|
| Green Wave | 7 | 0 | 13 | 7 | 27 |
| • Golden Hurricane | 14 | 17 | 9 | 10 | 50 |

- TV announcers: Eamon McAnaney, John Congemi

Scoring summary
| 1 | 12:47 | TULSA | Keevan Lucas 11-yard pass from Dane Evans (Redford Jones kick) | TULSA 7–0 |
| 1 | 7:25 | TULANE | Dontrell Hilliard 6-yard run (Andrew DiRocco kick) | Tied 7–7 |
| 1 | 5:24 | TULSA | Josh Atkinson 49-yard pass from Evans (Jones kick) | TULSA 14–7 |
| 2 | 12:03 | TULSA | D'Angelo Brewer 5-yard pass from Evans (Jones kick) | TULSA 21–7 |
| 2 | 7:05 | TULSA | Jones 20-yard field goal | TULSA 24–7 |
| 2 | 3:42 | TULSA | James Flanders 6-yard run (Jones kick) | TULSA 31–7 |
| 3 | 8:54 | TULSA | Rowdy Simon 16-yard run (Jones kick) | TULSA 38–7 |
| 3 | 2:10 | TULANE | Lazedrick Thompson 5-yard run (DiRocco kick) | TULSA 38–14 |
| 3 | 0:04 | TULANE | Hilliard 30-yard run (pass failed) | TULSA 38–20 |
| 3 | 0:04 | TULSA | McKinley Whitfield defensive two-point conversion | TULSA 40–20 |
| 4 | 12:32 | TULSA | Flanders 30-yard run (Jones kick) | TULSA 47–20 |
| 4 | 7:24 | TULSA | Jones 27-yard field goal | TULSA 50–20 |
| 4 | 5:07 | TULANE | Josh Rounds 1-yard run (DiRocco kick) | TULSA 50–27 |

=== At Memphis ===
| Team | 1 | 2 | 3 | 4 | Total |
|---|---|---|---|---|---|
| • Golden Hurricane | 14 | 21 | 10 | 14 | 59 |
| Tigers | 7 | 17 | 6 | 0 | 30 |

- TV announcers: Mike Corey, Rene Ingoglia

Scoring summary
| 1 | 11:42 | TU | James Flanders 14-yard run (Redford Jones kick) | TU 7–0 |
| 1 | 9:29 | TU | Flanders 52-yard run (Jones kick) | TU 14–0 |
| 1 | 7:57 | MEM | Darrell Henderson 6-yard run (Jake Elliott kick) | TU 14–7 |
| 2 | 12:32 | TU | Keevan Lucas 25-yard pass from Dane Evans (Jones kick) | TU 21–7 |
| 2 | 11:23 | MEM | Anthony Miller 59-yard pass from Riley Ferguson (Elliott kick) | TU 21–14 |
| 2 | 8:03 | TU | Flanders 1-yard run (Jones kick) | TU 28–14 |
| 2 | 6:01 | MEM | Kedarian Jones 12-yard pass from Ferguson (Elliott kick) | TU 28–21 |
| 2 | 2:31 | TU | Lucas 5-yard pass from Evans (Jones kick) | TU 35–21 |
| 2 | 1:31 | MEM | Elliott 40-yard field goal | TU 35–24 |
| 3 | 11:27 | MEM | Miller 3-yard pass from Ferguson (run failed) | TU 35–30 |
| 3 | 7:12 | TU | Jones 34-yard field goal | TU 38–30 |
| 3 | 3:06 | TU | Flanders 48-yard run (Jones kick) | TU 45–30 |
| 4 | 13:49 | TU | Flanders 7-yard run (Jones kick) | TU 52–30 |
| 4 | 5:11 | TU | Raymond Taylor 31-yard run (Jones kick) | TU 59–30 |

=== East Carolina ===
| Team | 1 | 2 | 3 | 4 | Total |
|---|---|---|---|---|---|
| Pirates | 7 | 0 | 10 | 7 | 24 |
| • Golden Hurricane | 14 | 10 | 14 | 7 | 45 |

- TV announcers: Shawn Kenney, Watson Brown

Scoring summary
| 1 | 11:57 | TU | James Flanders 22-yard run (Redford Jones kick) | TU 7–0 |
| 1 | 6:43 | TU | Keevan Lucas 14-yard pass from Dane Evans (Jones kick) | TU 14–0 |
| 1 | 4:41 | ECU | Zay Jones 51-yard pass from Philip Nelson (Davis Plowman kick) | TU 14–7 |
| 2 | 6:10 | TU | Jones 41-yard field goal | TU 17–7 |
| 2 | 0:24 | TU | Josh Atkinson 3-yard pass from Evans (Jones kick) | TU 24–7 |
| 3 | 12:49 | ECU | James Summers 1-yard run (Plowman kick) | TU 24–14 |
| 3 | 11:04 | TU | Flanders 7-yard run (Jones kick) | TU 31–14 |
| 3 | 7:02 | ECU | Plowman 39-yard field goal | TU 31–17 |
| 3 | 6:01 | TU | Atkinson 64-yard pass from Evans (Jones kick) | TU 38–17 |
| 4 | 1:38 | TU | D'Angelo Brewer 4-yard run (Jones kick) | TU 45–17 |
| 4 | 0:27 | ECU | Quay Johnson 10-yard pass from Gardner Minshew (Plowman kick) | TU 45–24 |

=== At Navy ===
| Team | 1 | 2 | 3 | 4 | Total |
|---|---|---|---|---|---|
| Golden Hurricane | 10 | 10 | 7 | 13 | 40 |
| • Midshipmen | 14 | 14 | 0 | 14 | 42 |

- TV announcers: John Sadak, Randy Cross, Sheehan Stanwick Burch

Scoring summary
| 1 | 13:41 | NAVY | Darryl Bonner 4-yard run (Bennett Moehring kick) | NAVY 7–0 |
| 1 | 13:25 | TU | Keevan Lucas 74-yard pass from Dane Evans (Redford Jones kick) | Tied 7–7 |
| 1 | 6:11 | TU | Jones 29-yard field goal | TU 10–7 |
| 1 | 4:53 | NAVY | Dishan Romine 41-yard run (Moehring kick) | NAVY 14–10 |
| 2 | 11:38 | NAVY | Will Worth 1-yard run (Moehring kick) | NAVY 21–10 |
| 2 | 10:09 | TU | Josh Atkinson 56-yard pass from Evans (Jones kick) | NAVY 21–17 |
| 2 | 3:01 | NAVY | Tyler Carmona 11-yard pass from Worth (Moehring kick) | NAVY 28–17 |
| 2 | 0:42 | TU | Jones 26-yard field goal | NAVY 28–20 |
| 3 | 3:28 | TU | Keenen Johnson 31-yard pass from Evans (Jones kick) | NAVY 28–27 |
| 4 | 13:41 | NAVY | Worth 15-yard run (Moehring kick) | NAVY 35–27 |
| 4 | 10:34 | TU | Evans 1-yard run (rush failed) | NAVY 35–33 |
| 4 | 7:58 | NAVY | Worth 44-yard run (Moehring kick) | NAVY 42–33 |
| 4 | 5:30 | TU | Chris Minter 22-yard pass from Evans (Jones kick) | NAVY 42–40 |

=== At UCF ===
| Team | 1 | 2 | 3 | 4 | Total |
|---|---|---|---|---|---|
| • Golden Hurricane | 7 | 7 | 21 | 0 | 35 |
| Knights | 8 | 6 | 0 | 6 | 20 |

- TV announcers: Mike Corey, Rene Ingoglia

Scoring summary
| 1 | 12:59 | UCF | D. J. Killings 28-yard Interception return (2-point pass good) | UCF 8–0 |
| 1 | 3:10 | TU | James Flanders 1-yard run (Redford Jones kick) | UCF 8–7 |
| 2 | 14:42 | TU | D'Angelo Brewer 2-yard run (Jones kick) | TU 14–8 |
| 2 | 1:23 | UCF | Matthew Wright 48-yard field goal | TU 14–11 |
| 2 | 0:00 | UCF | Wright 47-yard field goal | Tied 14–14 |
| 3 | 8:32 | TU | Josh Atkinson 15-yard pass from Dane Evans (Jones kick) | TU 21–14 |
| 3 | 4:56 | TU | Keevan Lucas 45-yard pass from Evans (Jones kick) | TU 28–14 |
| 3 | 0:35 | TU | Brewer 8-yard run (Jones kick) | TU 35–14 |
| 4 | 12:04 | UCF | Adrian Killins 3-yard run (Wright kick) | TU 35–20 |

=== Cincinnati ===
| Team | 1 | 2 | 3 | 4 | OT | Total |
|---|---|---|---|---|---|---|
| Bearcats | 17 | 7 | 7 | 3 | 3 | 37 |
| • Golden Hurricane | 7 | 7 | 7 | 13 | 6 | 40 |

- TV announcers: Mike Corey, Rene Ingoglia

Scoring summary
| 1 | 8:31 | CIN | Thomas Geddis 38-yard pass from Hayden Moore (Josh Pasley kick) | CIN 7–0 |
| 1 | 7:25 | CIN | Moore 29-yard pass from Tyler Cogswell (Pasley kick) | CIN 14–0 |
| 1 | 5:44 | TU | James Flanders 5-yard run (Redford Jones kick) | CIN 14–7 |
| 1 | 3:06 | CIN | Pasley 23-yard field goal | CIN 17–7 |
| 2 | 9:56 | CIN | Devin Gray 82-yard pass from Moore (Pasley kick) | CIN 24–7 |
| 2 | 0:43 | TU | Keevan Lucas 17-yard pass from Dane Evans (Jones kick) | CIN 24–14 |
| 3 | 11:53 | TU | Justin Hobbs 2-yard pass from Evans (Jones kick) | CIN 24–21 |
| 3 | 4:43 | CIN | Jerron Rollins 70-yard pass from Moore (Pasley kick) | CIN 31–21 |
| 4 | 14:56 | TU | Jones 24-yard field goal | CIN 31–24 |
| 4 | 5:57 | CIN | Pasley 39-yard field goal | CIN 34–24 |
| 4 | 3:12 | TU | Chris Minter 5-yard pass from Evans (Jones kick) | CIN 34–31 |
| 4 | 0:00 | TU | Jones 22-yard field goal | Tied 34–34 |
| OT | | CIN | Pasley 33-yard field goal | CIN 37–34 |
| OT | | TU | Flanders 4-yard run | TU 40–37 |

=== Central Michigan–Miami Beach Bowl ===
| Team | 1 | 2 | 3 | 4 | Total |
|---|---|---|---|---|---|
| Chippewas | 3 | 0 | 0 | 7 | 10 |
| • Golden Hurricane | 10 | 17 | 21 | 7 | 55 |

- TV announcers: Allen Bestwick, Mike Bellotti, Kris Budden

Scoring summary
| 1 | 7:24 | TU | Josh Atkinson 5-yard pass from Dane Evans (Redford Jones kick) | TU 7–0 |
| 1 | 2:55 | TU | Jones 46-yard field goal | TU 10–0 |
| 1 | 0:55 | CMU | Brian Eavey 26-yard field goal | TU 10–3 |
| 2 | 12:18 | TU | Jones 44-yard field goal | TU 13–3 |
| 2 | 4:03 | TU | Keevan Lucas 13-yard pass from Evans (Jones kick) | TU 20–3 |
| 2 | 0:59 | TU | Chris Minter 4-yard pass from Evans (Jones kick) | TU 27–3 |
| 3 | 9:50 | TU | James Flanders 17-yard run (Jones kick) | TU 34–3 |
| 3 | 6:53 | TU | Lucas 28-yard pass from Evans (Jones kick) | TU 41–3 |
| 3 | 2:16 | TU | Lucas 11-yard pass from Evans (Jones kick) | TU 48–3 |
| 4 | 12:49 | TU | Jesse Brubaker 66-yard Interception return (Jones kick) | TU 55–3 |
| 4 | 9:21 | CMU | Jahray Hayes 13-yard run (Eavey kick) | TU 55–10 |

== Roster ==
2016 Tulsa Golden Hurricane football team roster
Players
Coaches
Offense

| Pos. | # | Name | Class |
|---|---|---|---|
| WR | 1 | Josh Stewart | Fr |
| WR | 2 | Keevan Lucas | Sr |
| RB | 4 | D'Angelo Brewer | Jr |
| WR | 5 | Brodrick Umblance | Jr |
| TE | 6 | Chris Minter | So |
| WR | 7 | Bishop Louie | Jr |
| WR | 8 | Keenen Johnson | Fr |
| QB | 9 | Dane Evans | RSr |
| QB | 10 | Chad President | So |
| WR | 11 | Nigel Carter | Jr |
| QB | 12 | Ryan Rubley | RJr |
| QB | 13 | Luke Skipper | Fr |
| QB | 15 | Samuel Gottsch | RSo |
| WR | 16 | Jarion Anderson | RFr |
| TE | 18 | David Fitzwater | Fr |
| QB | 19 | Will Hefley III | RFr |
| RB | 20 | James Flanders | RSr |
| RB | 21 | Rowdy Simon | RJr |
| RB | 22 | Javon Thomas | RFr |
| WR | 23 | Jordan Brown | Fr |
| RB | 24 | Corey Taylor II | Fr |
| RB | 25 | Ramadi Warren | RSo |
| RB | 27 | Matthew Harvey | Fr |
| WR | 29 | Justin Hobbs | RSo |
| RB | 30 | Raymond Taylor | RSr |
| TE | 33 | Rob Riederer | RJr |
| WR | 41 | Andrew McKinnis | Fr |
| C | 51 | Blake Browning | RFr |
| C | 53 | Zac Uhles | RJr |
| OT | 58 | Willie Wright | RSo |
| OL | 63 | John Newfield | Fr |
| OT | 65 | Chris Ivy Jr. | RFr |
| OT | 66 | Evan Plagg | RJr |
| G | 67 | Tristan Wyatt | RFr |
| G | 68 | Tiller Bucktrot | Fr |
| OT | 70 | Clay Greathouse | Fr |
| G | 72 | Tyler Bowling | RSo |
| C | 74 | Chandler Miller | RSo |
| G | 75 | Alex Pagonis | Sr |
| OT | 76 | Waahid Muhammad | Fr |
| OT | 77 | Isaac Johnson | RSo |
| OT | 78 | Blake Belcher | RSr |
| G | 79 | Rowdy Frederick | Fr |
| WR | 80 | Randall Smith | RJr |
| WR | 84 | Avery Gragg | RFr |
| WR | 86 | David Snelling | RFr |
| WR | 87 | Coleman Fields | Fr |
| WR | 88 | Josh Atkinson | RSr |
| TE | 89 | Payton Prince | RSo |

Defense

| Pos. | # | Name | Class |
|---|---|---|---|
| CB | 1 | Keanu Hill | RJr |
| CB | 2 | Kerwin Thomas | RJr |
| LB | 4 | Robert Revels III | Fr |
| LB | 5 | Tim Quickel | RSo |
| LB | 6 | Diamon Cannon | RFr |
| CB | 7 | Johnell Celistan | Sr |
| DT | 8 | Jesse Brubaker | RJr |
| CB | 9 | Reggie Robinson | RFr |
| S | 10 | Manny Bunch | Fr |
| CB | 11 | Keidrien Wadley | RFr |
| LB | 12 | Micheal Thomas | RSr |
| S | 13 | Jordan Mitchell | Jr |
| DE | 15 | Trevis Gipson | RFr |
| CB | 16 | Montray Norris | Fr |
| S | 21 | McKinley Whitfield | So |
| S | 22 | Jeremy Brady | RSr |
| CB | 23 | Will Barrow | Sr |
| LB | 24 | Treyvon Reeves | Fr |
| LB | 28 | Craig Suits | RJr |
| S | 30 | Cristian Williams | RFr |
| LB | 32 | DJ Allen | Fr |
| S | 37 | Gage Murphy | Jr |
| LB | 38 | Matt Linscott | RSr |
| LB | 40 | Trent Martin | RSr |
| LB | 42 | Cooper Edmiston | Fr |
| LB | 43 | Conner Sherwood | RSr |
| LB | 44 | Petera Wilson Jr. | Jr |
| LB | 46 | Forrest Harrell III | RFr |
| LB | 47 | Blake Landon | Fr |
| LB | 48 | Rylee Simon | RFr |
| LB | 50 | Branden Ferguson | Fr |
| LB | 52 | Thomas von Borstel | RFr |
| DT | 54 | Shemarr Robinson | Fr |
| LB | 55 | Matt Hickman | RSr |
| DE | 57 | Beau Wooden | Fr |
| LB | 59 | C.J. Gooden | RJr |
| DT | 71 | Jacob Pugh | Fr |
| DE | 85 | Kolton Shindelar | RJr |
| DE | 88 | Jimmy Nelson | Fr |
| DE | 90 | Frankie Davis | RJr |
| DE | 91 | Jake Hanks | RJr |
| DE | 93 | Johnnie Williams | Fr |
| DT | 95 | Hayden Carman | RSr |
| DE | 96 | Myles Mouton | RSo |
| DT | 97 | Tyarise Stevenson | Fr |
| DE | 98 | Jeremy Smith | Jr |
| DT | 99 | Jerry Uwaezuoke | RSr |

Special teams

| Pos. | # | Name | Class |
|---|---|---|---|
| K | 19 | Redford Jones | RJr |
| P | 26 | Dalton Parks | Sr |
| K | 35 | Drew Klinghagen | RFr |
| K | 39 | Preston Soper | RJr |
| LS | 46 | Spencer Shores | RFr |
| K | 49 | Tristan Lacey | RSo |
| LS | 60 | Ty Lott | RJr |
| LS | 62 | Robert Hill | Fr |
| K | 90 | Nathan Walker | RSo |

Head coach

- Philip Montgomery (Tarleton State)

Coordinators/assistant coaches

- Brian Norwood (Hawaiʻi)
  Associate head coach, Co-defensive Coordinator, Safeties
- Bill Young (Oklahoma State)
  Defensive coordinator, defensive line
- Jermial Ashley (Kansas)
  Defensive line coach
- Mike Bloesch (Houston)
  Offensive line coach
- Aaron Fletcher (East Texas A&M)
  Cornerbacks coach
- Joseph Gillespie (Angelo State)
  Linebackers coach
- Justin Hill (Rice)
  Running backs coach
- Calvin Lowry (Penn State)
  Receivers coach
- Beau Trahan (Texas)
  Quarterbacks coach
- Jordan Najvar (Baylor)
  Offensive quality control
- Luke Olson (Southern Nazarene)
  Defensive quality control
- Clint Rountree (Tulsa)
  Director of high school relations
- Kyle Grooms (Tulsa)
  Director of football operations
- Ravi Savitala (UC Santa Cruz)
  Assistant director of football operations & recruiting
- Dan Bitson (Tulsa)
  Director of player personnel & development
- D.J. Welte (Arkansas State)
  Director of football video operations
- Mike Hicks
  Defensive analyst
- Paul Cherry
  Defensive graduate assistant
- Cody Morrison
  Offensive graduate assistant
- Tom Ososkie
  Director of scouting
- Grant Lester
  Offensive analyst

Legend

- (C) Team captain
- (S) Suspended
- (I) Ineligible
- Injured
- Redshirt

Roster
Last update: September 2016
