= Brandon Wilson (American football) =

American football player (born 1994)

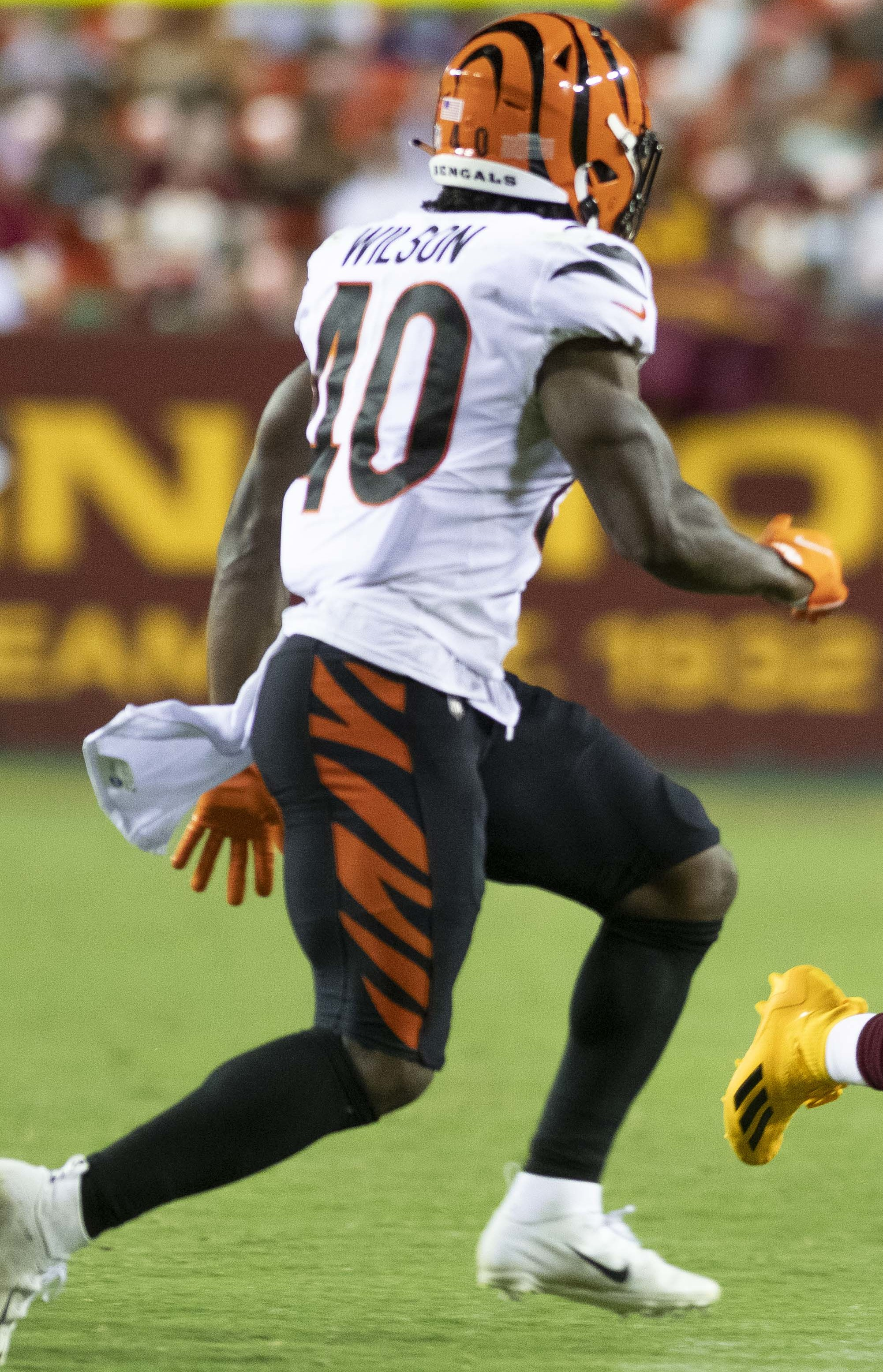
- Wilson with the Cincinnati Bengals in 2021

No. 40
- Position: Safety

Personal information
- Born: July 27, 1994 (age 32); Shreveport, Louisiana, U.S.
- Listed height: 5 ft 10 in (1.78 m)
- Listed weight: 200 lb (91 kg)

Career information
- High school: Calvary Baptist Academy (Shreveport)
- College: Houston
- NFL draft: 2017: 6th round, 207th overall pick

Career history
- Cincinnati Bengals (2017–2022); Indianapolis Colts (2023)*
- * Offseason or practice squad member only

Career NFL statistics
- Total tackles: 59
- Forced fumbles: 3
- Fumble recoveries: 1
- Return yards: 1,542
- Return touchdowns: 2
- Stats at Pro Football Reference

Brandon Wilson (born July 27, 1994) is an American former professional football player who was a safety in the National Football League (NFL). He played college football for the Houston Cougars.

== College career ==
Wilson played on both sides of the ball at the University of Houston, at cornerback behind William Jackson III and also at running back. He also played on special teams as a kick returner. Wilson's junior season in 2015 included multiple touchdowns on offense, defense and special teams. Wilson's college career was highlighted by his famous 110 yard touchdown return after a missed field goal attempt by Oklahoma on September 3, 2016. Officially, the return went for 100 yards, even though Wilson fielded the 53-yard missed field goal in the back of his own end zone. The Cougars went on to defeat the #5 ranked Oklahoma Sooners in the week one upset.

== Professional career ==
Pre-draft measurables
Height	Weight	Arm length	Hand span	40-yard dash	10-yard split	20-yard split	20-yard shuttle	Three-cone drill	Vertical jump	Broad jump	Bench press
5 ft 10 1/8 in (1.78 m)	198 lb (90 kg)	30 1/2 in (0.77 m)	9 in (0.23 m)	4.40 s	1.54 s	2.53 s	4.42 s	7.09 s	41.0 in (1.04 m)	11 ft 1 in (3.38 m)	24 reps
All values from Pro Day

=== Cincinnati Bengals ===
Wilson was selected by the Cincinnati Bengals in the sixth round, 207th overall, in the 2017 NFL draft. He was one of three Cougars to be selected that year. He was only the fourth player ever selected by the Bengals organization after a trade up in the draft. The team elected to play Wilson at safety rather than the cornerback position he played in college.

Wilson injured his knee during rookie minicamp, and was placed on the non-football injury list in late July. Wilson was waived on September 2, 2017 and was signed to the practice squad the next day. He was promoted to the active roster on November 11, 2017.

On October 13, 2019, in a Week 6 loss to the Baltimore Ravens, Wilson returned a kickoff ninety-two yards for his first career touchdown. He also added four tackles and a forced fumble in the game. He was placed on injured reserve on December 6, 2019 with a hand injury.

Wilson re-signed on a one-year contract with the Bengals on April 26, 2020. On November 29, 2020, Wilson returned a kickoff by the New York Giants for a 103-yard touchdown. It was the longest touchdown return in franchise history.

Wilson signed a two-year contract extension with the Bengals on March 16, 2021.

On November 9, 2021, Wilson was placed on injured reserve after suffering a torn ACL in Week 9.

On August 23, 2022, Wilson was placed on the reserve/physically unable to perform list.

=== Indianapolis Colts ===
On November 22, 2023, Wilson was signed to the Indianapolis Colts practice squad. He was released on December 11.
