= Dane Evans =

American gridiron football player (born 1993)

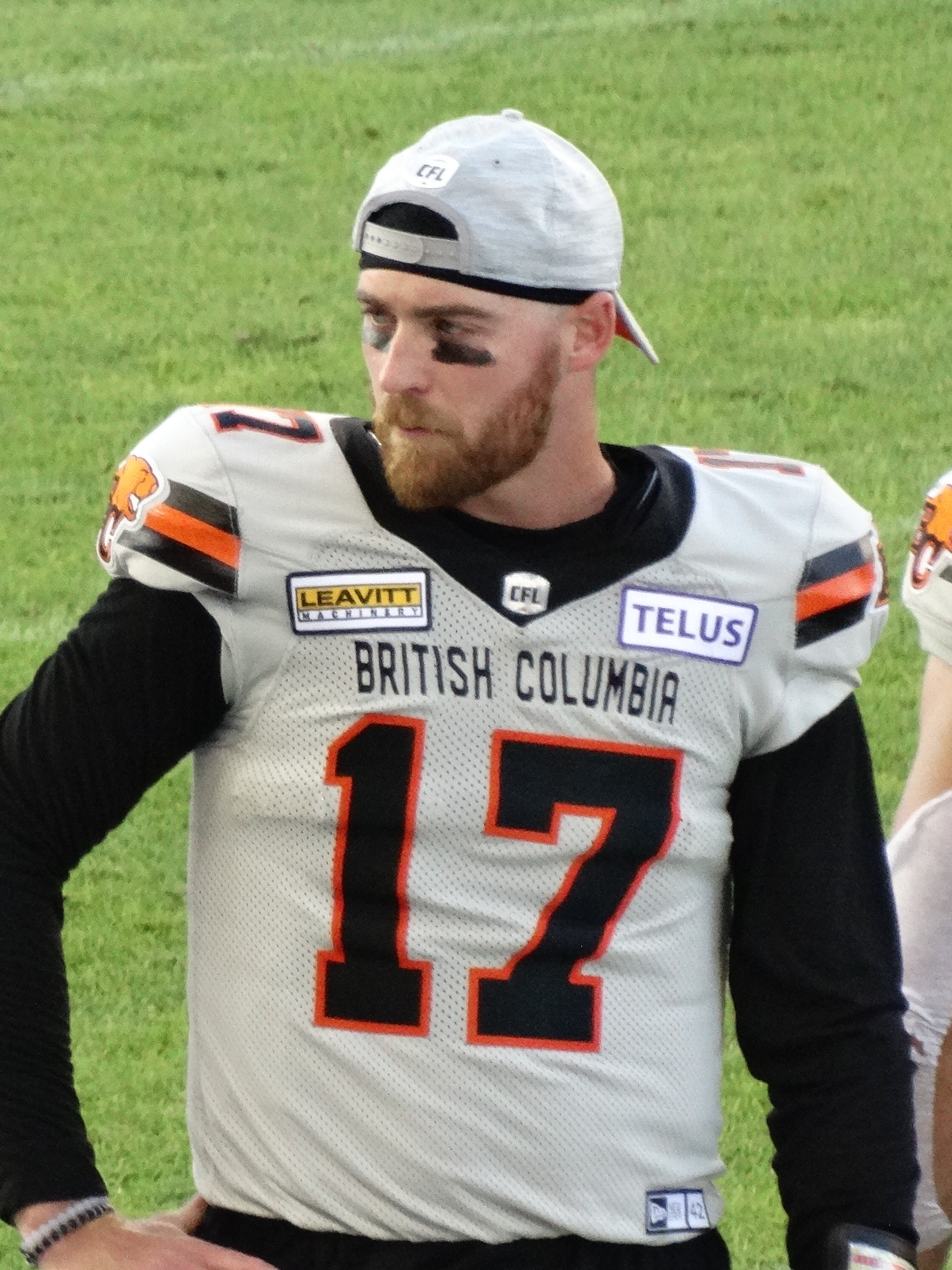
- Evans with the BC Lions in 2023

No. 9, 17
- Position: Quarterback

Personal information
- Born: November 19, 1993 (age 33); Chickasha, Oklahoma, U.S.
- Listed height: 6 ft 1 in (1.85 m)
- Listed weight: 218 lb (99 kg)

Career information
- High school: Sanger (Sanger, Texas)
- College: Tulsa (2012–2016)
- NFL draft: 2017: undrafted

Career history
- 2017: Philadelphia Eagles*
- 2017–2022: Hamilton Tiger-Cats
- 2023: BC Lions
- * Offseason or practice squad member only

Career CFL statistics
- Passing completions: 769
- Passing attempts: 1,122
- Passing yards: 9,636
- TD–INT: 49–40
- Rushing touchdowns: 10
- Stats at Pro Football Reference
- Stats at CFL.ca

Stephen Dane Evans (born November 19, 1993) is an American former professional football player who was a quarterback for six seasons in the Canadian Football League (CFL). He was a member of the Philadelphia Eagles, Hamilton Tiger-Cats, and BC Lions. He played college football for the Tulsa Golden Hurricane.

== College career ==
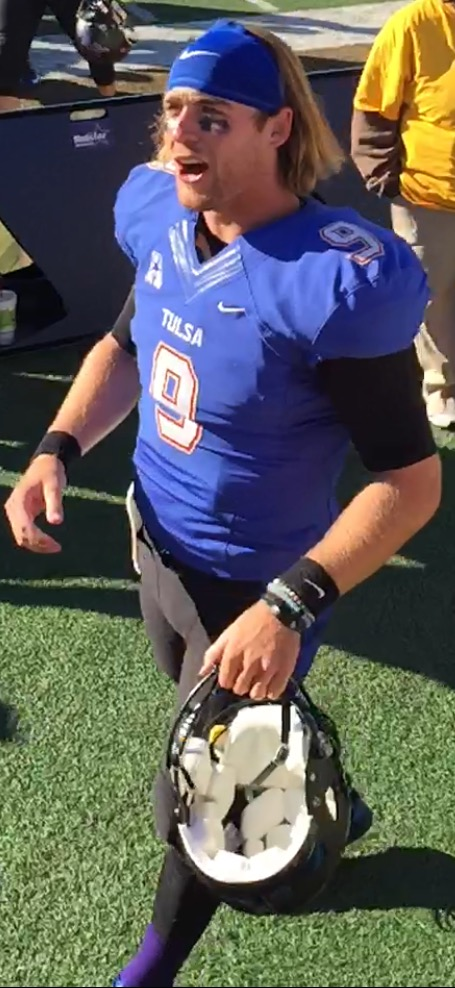
Evans with Tulsa in 2015

Evans passed for 3,102 yards as a sophomore in 2014. In 2015, he completed 305 of 485 passes for 4,332 yards and 25 touchdowns and ranked eighth among NCAA Division I FBS quarterbacks in passing yardage. As a senior, he passed for 3,348 yards and 32 touchdowns.

== Professional career ==
=== Pre-draft ===
Evans was rated the 25th best quarterback in the 2017 NFL draft by NFLDraftScout.com.

Pre-draft measurables
Height	Weight	40-yard dash	10-yard split	20-yard split	20-yard shuttle	Three-cone drill	Vertical jump	Broad jump
6 ft 1 in (1.85 m)	210 lb (95 kg)	5.05 s	1.74 s	2.84 s	4.41 s	7.22 s	31 in (0.79 m)	9 ft 7 in (2.92 m)
All values from Tulsa Pro Day

=== Philadelphia Eagles ===
After going undrafted in the 2017 NFL Draft, Evans signed with the Philadelphia Eagles on June 30, 2017. He was waived on September 1, 2017.

=== Hamilton Tiger-Cats ===
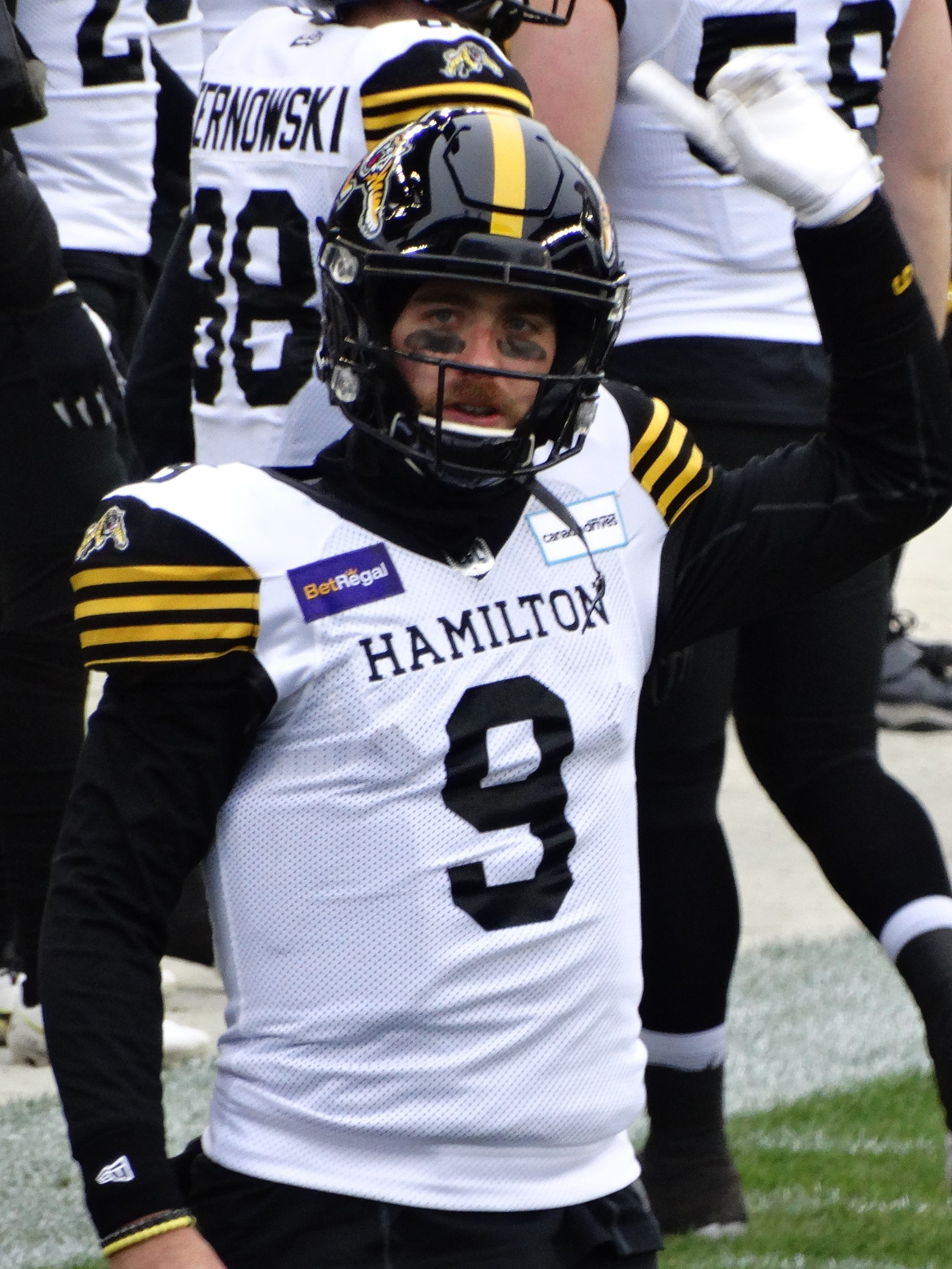
Evans with the Hamilton Tiger-Cats in 2021

On October 3, 2017, Evans was signed to the Hamilton Tiger-Cats' practice roster. On November 2, 2017, he was promoted to the active roster. Evans made his first career CFL start on November 3, 2018, throwing for 315 yards in a 30–28 loss against the Montreal Alouettes. He finished the season having played in three games, completing 26 of 42 pass attempts for 383 yards with two touchdowns and two interceptions.

On April 9, 2019, Evans signed a contract extension with Hamilton through the 2021 season. He began the season as the backup quarterback and came in relief of injured starting quarterback Jeremiah Masoli in Week 7 of the 2019 season to lead the Ti-Cats to victory, moving them into first place in the league with a 5–1 record. In the following days, it was revealed that Masoli suffered a torn ACL injury and would miss the remainder of the season; thrusting Evans into the starting role. Evans started 11 of the last 12 games of the season, and was named a CFL Top Performer for the month of September. He finished the regular season having completed 298 passes out of 413 attempts for 3,754 passing yards, 21 passing touchdowns, and 13 interceptions. He had a 9–2 record as a starter and led the Tiger-Cats to a first-place finish in the East Division. In his first career playoff start, he completed 21 passes out of 36 attempts for 386 yards, including one touchdown and one interception, en route to his first playoff win and berth in the 107th Grey Cup. The Tiger Cats were defeated by the Winnipeg Blue Bombers in the championship match.

Evans restructured his contract with the Tiger-Cats in January 2020; however the 2020 season was cancelled due to the COVID-19 pandemic. During the 2020 football season, Evans was hired as a graduate assistant by the University of North Texas. Evans began the 2021 season as the backup to Jeremiah Masoli, however he was named the starter for the team's Week 4 game against the Montreal Alouettes. He suffered a lower-body injury partway though the team's Week 6 game against the Toronto Argonauts: On September 13, 2021, it was announced that Evans would miss four to six weeks recovering. On October 19, 2021, the Ti-Cats announced that Evans had been activated from injured reserve. Evans played in the second half of the final game of the season for the Ticats, securing a 24–3 win. After Masoli got off to a slow start in the Eastern Final against the Argonauts Evans replaced him and completed all 16 of his pass attempts for 249 yards and a touchdown leading Hamilton to a Grey Cup berth. Following the win, Ticats head coach Orlando Steinauer named Evans the starter for the 108th Grey Cup. However, Evans was injured in the second quarter and was forced to leave the game, being replaced by Masoli who was ultimately defeated by the Blue Bombers in overtime.

On January 12, 2022, Dane Evans signed a 2-year contract extension to remain with the Hamilton Tiger Cats. Evans began the 2022 season as the starting quarterback after Jeremiah Masoli signed with the Ottawa Redblacks in free agency: Matthew Shiltz was signed to be the backup quarterback. In the middle of the season Evans battled through a shoulder injury. After missing three of four games Evans returned to the starting lineup on September 17, 2022. By the end of the season Evans had fallen out of favour with the management in Hamilton. In late January 2023, Hamilton signed veteran quarterback Bo Levi Mitchell to a three-year contract with the expectation he will be their starting quarterback in 2023 and beyond. Given his large salary, the Tiger-Cats were reluctant to retain Evans as a backup quarterback, and thus his future in Hamilton was uncertain.

=== BC Lions ===
On February 23, 2023, Evans was traded to the BC Lions in exchange for a conditional fourth-round selection in the 2024 CFL draft. According to TSN insider Farhan Lalji, Evans agreed to a restructured contract to reflect the fact he will be competing for the number two quarterback role behind presumed starter Vernon Adams Jr. His base salary in 2023 was reported at $94,000 and could earn up to a maximum of $151,000 if he achieves multiple incentive based bonuses. In Week 6 Adams suffered a knee injury and Evans came off the bench to help the Lions secure victory over the Roughriders. He was named the starting quarterback for the following week while Adams recovered. He started in two games in 2023 and played in 16 regular season games, where he had 71 completions on 103 attempts for 829 yards with four touchdowns and six interceptions. On January 1, 2024, he announced his retirement from professional football.

== Career statistics ==
=== CFL ===
Teams		Games			Passing								Rushing			
Season	Team	GP	GS	Record	Cmp	Att	Pct	Yds	Avg	TD	Int	Rtg	Att	Yds	Avg	TD
2018	HAM	18	1	0–1	26	42	61.9	383	9.1	2	2	87.7	12	34	2.8	0
2019	HAM	18	11	9–2	298	413	72.2	3,754	9.1	21	13	103.9	34	161	4.7	3
2020	HAM	Season cancelled														
2021	HAM	10	3	2–1	69	107	64.5	787	7.4	6	3	93.5	20	114	5.7	3
2022	HAM	17	13	6–7	305	457	66.7	3,883	8.5	16	16	92.8	59	202	3.4	4
2023	BC	16	2	1–1	71	103	68.9	829	8.0	4	6	81.7	6	30	5.0	0
Career		79	30	18–12	769	1,122	68.5	9,636	8.6	49	40	94.7	131	541	4.1	10

=== College ===
Teams		Games		Passing								Rushing			
Season	Team	GP	GS	Cmp	Att	Pct	Yds	Y/A	TD	Int	Rtg	Att	Yds	Avg	TD
2012	Tulsa	0	0	Redshirted											
2013	Tulsa	8	5	84	195	43.1	898	4.6	4	10	78.3	24	52	2.2	1
2014	Tulsa	12	12	256	462	55.4	3,102	6.7	23	17	120.9	77	58	0.8	3
2015	Tulsa	13	13	305	485	62.9	4,332	8.9	25	8	151.6	96	−9	−0.1	2
2016	Tulsa	13	13	259	435	59.5	3,348	7.7	32	12	142.9	47	−29	−0.6	4
Career		46	43	904	1,577	57.3	11,680	7.4	84	47	131.2	244	72	0.3	10

== Personal life ==
Evans is of Native American ancestry, belonging to the Wichita; his great-grandmother, Doris McLemore, was the last fluent speaker of the Wichita language.
