= 2017 in American football =

== 2016–17 NCAA football bowl games ==
- December 17, 2016 – January 9, 2017: 2016–17 NCAA football bowl games Schedule

=== College Football Playoff (CFP) and Championship Game ===
- December 30, 2016: 2016 Orange Bowl in Miami Gardens, Florida at the Hard Rock Stadium
  - The Florida State Seminoles defeated the Michigan Wolverines, 33–32.
- December 31, 2016: 2016 Peach Bowl in Atlanta at the Georgia Dome
  - The Alabama Crimson Tide defeated the Washington Huskies, 24–7.
- December 31, 2016: 2016 Fiesta Bowl in Glendale, Arizona at the University of Phoenix Stadium
  - The Clemson Tigers defeated the Ohio State Buckeyes, 31–0.
- January 2, 2017: 2017 Cotton Bowl Classic in Arlington at the AT&T Stadium
  - The Wisconsin Badgers defeated the Western Michigan Broncos, 24–16.
- January 2, 2017: 2017 Rose Bowl in Pasadena at the Rose Bowl
  - The USC Trojans defeated the Penn State Nittany Lions, 52–49.
- January 2, 2017: 2017 Sugar Bowl in New Orleans at the Mercedes-Benz Superdome
  - The Oklahoma Sooners defeated the Auburn Tigers, 35–13.
- January 9, 2017: 2017 College Football Playoff National Championship in Tampa at the Raymond James Stadium
  - The Clemson Tigers defeated the Alabama Crimson Tide, 35–31.

=== Non-CFP bowl games ===
- December 17, 2016: 2016 New Mexico Bowl in Albuquerque at the University Stadium
  - The New Mexico Lobos defeated the UTSA Roadrunners, 23–20.
- December 17, 2016: 2016 Las Vegas Bowl in Las Vegas at the Sam Boyd Stadium
  - The San Diego State Aztecs defeated the Houston Cougars, 34–10.
- December 17, 2016: 2016 Camellia Bowl in Montgomery at the Cramton Bowl
  - The Appalachian State Mountaineers defeated the Toledo Rockets, 31–28.
- December 17, 2016: 2016 Cure Bowl in Orlando at the Camping World Stadium
  - The Arkansas State Red Wolves defeated the UCF Knights, 31–13.
- December 17, 2016: 2016 New Orleans Bowl in New Orleans at the Mercedes-Benz Superdome
  - The Southern Miss Golden Eagles defeated the Louisiana–Lafayette Ragin' Cajuns, 28–21.
- December 19, 2016: 2016 Miami Beach Bowl in Miami at Marlins Park
  - The Tulsa Golden Hurricane defeated the Central Michigan Chippewas, 55–10.
- December 20, 2016: 2016 Boca Raton Bowl in Boca Raton at the FAU Stadium
  - The Western Kentucky Hilltoppers defeated the Memphis Tigers, 51–31.
- December 21, 2016: 2016 Poinsettia Bowl in San Diego at Qualcomm Stadium
  - The BYU Cougars defeated the Wyoming Cowboys, 24–21.
- December 22, 2016: 2016 Famous Idaho Potato Bowl in Boise at the Albertsons Stadium
  - The Idaho Vandals defeated the Colorado State Rams, 61–50.
- December 23, 2016: 2016 Bahamas Bowl in Nassau at the Thomas Robinson Stadium
  - The Old Dominion Monarchs defeated the Eastern Michigan Eagles, 24–20.
- December 23, 2016: 2016 Armed Forces Bowl in Fort Worth at the Amon G. Carter Stadium
  - The Louisiana Tech Bulldogs defeated the Navy Midshipmen, 48–45.
- December 23, 2016: 2016 Dollar General Bowl in Mobile at the Ladd–Peebles Stadium
  - The Troy Trojans defeated the Ohio Bobcats, 28–23.
- December 24, 2016: 2016 Hawaii Bowl in Honolulu at the Aloha Stadium
  - The Hawaii Rainbow Warriors defeated the Middle Tennessee Blue Raiders, 52–35.
- December 26, 2016: 2016 St. Petersburg Bowl in St. Petersburg at Tropicana Field
  - The Mississippi State Bulldogs defeated the Miami RedHawks, 17–16.
- December 26, 2016: 2016 Quick Lane Bowl in Detroit at Ford Field
  - The Boston College Eagles defeated the Maryland Terrapins, 36–30.
- December 26, 2016: 2016 Independence Bowl in Shreveport at the Independence Stadium
  - The NC State Wolfpack defeated the Vanderbilt Commodores, 41–17.
- December 27, 2016: 2016 Heart of Dallas Bowl in Dallas at the Cotton Bowl
  - The Army Black Knights defeated the North Texas Mean Green, 38–31.
- December 27, 2016: 2016 Military Bowl in Annapolis at the Navy–Marine Corps Memorial Stadium
  - The Wake Forest Demon Deacons defeated the Temple Owls, 34–26.
- December 27, 2016: 2016 Holiday Bowl in San Diego at Qualcomm Stadium
  - The Minnesota Golden Gophers defeated the Washington State Cougars, 17–12.
- December 27, 2016: 2016 Cactus Bowl in Phoenix at Chase Field
  - The Baylor Bears defeated the Boise State Broncos, 31–12.
- December 28, 2016: 2016 Pinstripe Bowl in The Bronx (New York City) at Yankee Stadium
  - The Northwestern Wildcats defeated the Pittsburgh Panthers, 31–24.
- December 28, 2016: 2016 Russell Athletic Bowl in Orlando at the Camping World Stadium
  - The Miami Hurricanes defeated the West Virginia Mountaineers, 31–14.
- December 28, 2016: 2016 Foster Farms Bowl in Santa Clara at Levi's Stadium
  - The Utah Utes defeated the Indiana Hoosiers, 26–24.
- December 28, 2016: 2016 Texas Bowl in Houston at NRG Stadium
  - The Kansas State Wildcats defeated the Texas A&M Aggies, 33–28.
- December 29, 2016: 2016 Birmingham Bowl in Birmingham at Legion Field
  - The South Florida Bulls defeated the South Carolina Gamecocks, 46–39.
- December 29, 2016: 2016 Belk Bowl in Charlotte at the Bank of America Stadium
  - The Virginia Tech Hokies defeated the Arkansas Razorbacks, 35–24.
- December 29, 2016: 2016 Alamo Bowl in San Antonio at the Alamodome
  - The Oklahoma State Cowboys defeated the Colorado Buffaloes, 38–8.
- December 30, 2016: 2016 Liberty Bowl in Memphis at the Liberty Bowl Memorial Stadium
  - The Georgia Bulldogs defeated the TCU Horned Frogs, 31–23.
- December 30, 2016: 2016 Sun Bowl in El Paso at the Sun Bowl
  - The Stanford Cardinal defeated the North Carolina Tar Heels, 25–23.
- December 30, 2016: 2016 Music City Bowl in Nashville at Nissan Stadium
  - The Tennessee Volunteers defeated the Nebraska Cornhuskers, 38–24.
- December 30, 2016: 2016 Arizona Bowl in Tucson at Arizona Stadium
  - The Air Force Falcons defeated the South Alabama Jaguars, 45–21.
- December 31, 2016: 2016 Citrus Bowl in Orlando at the Camping World Stadium
  - The LSU Tigers defeated the Louisville Cardinals, 29–9.
- December 31, 2016: 2016 TaxSlayer Bowl in Jacksonville at EverBank Field
  - The Georgia Tech Yellow Jackets defeated the Kentucky Wildcats, 33–18.
- January 2, 2017: 2017 Outback Bowl in Tampa at the Raymond James Stadium
  - The Florida Gators defeated the Iowa Hawkeyes, 30–3.

== National Football League ==
- January 29: 2017 Pro Bowl in Orlando at Camping World Stadium
  - The AFC defeated the NFC, 20–13.
  - Offensive MVP: Travis Kelce (Kansas City Chiefs)
  - Defensive MVP: Lorenzo Alexander (Buffalo Bills)
- February 5: Super Bowl LI in Houston at NRG Stadium
  - The New England Patriots defeated the Atlanta Falcons, 34–28 in overtime, to win their fifth Super Bowl title.
  - MVP: Tom Brady (New England Patriots)
- April 27 – 29: 2017 NFL draft in Philadelphia
  - #1 pick: Myles Garrett (to the Cleveland Browns from the Texas A&M Aggies)
- September 7 – December 31: 2017 NFL season

== IFAF ==
- June 24 – 30: 2017 IFAF Women's World Championship in Langley, British Columbia
  - The United States defeated Canada, 41–16, to win their third consecutive IFAF Women's World Championship title.
  - Mexico took third place.
- November 2 – 5: 2017 IFAF Beach Football World Championship in Tamarindo (debut event)
  - Event was cancelled.

== Pro Football Hall of Fame ==
- Class of 2017:
  - Morten Andersen, player
  - Terrell Davis, player
  - Kenny Easley, player
  - Jerry Jones, player
  - Jason Taylor, player
  - LaDainian Tomlinson, player
  - Kurt Warner, player
