= 2016 San Jose State Spartans football team =

American college football season

2016 San Jose State Spartans football
- Conference: Mountain West Conference
- West Division
- Record: 4–8 (3–5 MW)
- Head coach: Ron Caragher (4th season)
- Offensive coordinator: Al Borges (2nd season)
- Offensive scheme: Multiple
- Defensive coordinator: Ron English (1st season)
- Base defense: 4–3
- Home stadium: CEFCU Stadium

2016 Mountain West Conference football standings
	Conf.			Overall
Team	W		L	W		L
Mountain Division
Wyoming xy	6	–	2	8	–	6
Boise State x	6	–	2	10	–	3
New Mexico x	6	–	2	9	–	4
Air Force	5	–	3	10	–	3
Colorado State	5	–	3	7	–	6
Utah State	1	–	7	3	–	9
West Division
No. 25 San Diego State xy$	6	–	2	11	–	3
Hawaii	4	–	4	7	–	7
Nevada	3	–	5	5	–	7
San Jose State	3	–	5	4	–	8
UNLV	3	–	5	4	–	8
Fresno State	0	–	8	1	–	11
Championship: San Diego State 27, Wyoming 24
$ – Conference champion; x – Division champion/co-champions; y – Championship game participant; Rankings from AP Poll

The 2016 San Jose State Spartans football team represented San Jose State University in the 2016 NCAA Division I FBS football season. The Spartans were led by fourth-year head coach Ron Caragher and played their home games at Spartan Stadium. They were members of the Mountain West Conference in the West Division. They finished the season 4–8, 3–5 in Mountain West play to finish in a three-way tie for third place in the West Division.

On November 27, head coach Ron Caragher was fired. Caragher finished at San Jose State with a four-year record of 19–30.

== Schedule ==
Date	Time	Opponent	Site	TV	Result	Attendance
September 3	4:00 pm	at Tulsa*	Chapman Stadium; Tulsa, OK	CBSSN	L 10–45	18,748
September 10	1:30 pm	No. 16 (FCS) Portland State*	CEFCU Stadium; San Jose, CA		W 66–35	13,210
September 17	7:30 pm	Utah*	CEFCU Stadium; San Jose, CA	CBSSN	L 17–34	16,041
September 24	9:00 am	at Iowa State*	Jack Trice Stadium; Ames, IA	FSN	L 10–44	50,851
October 1	1:00 pm	at New Mexico	University Stadium; Albuquerque, NM	ROOT	L 41–48	19,852
October 8	1:30 pm	Hawaii^{†}	CEFCU Stadium; San Jose, CA (Dick Tomey Legacy Game)	Oceanic PPV	L 17–34	16,837
October 15	7:30 pm	Nevada	CEFCU Stadium; San Jose, CA	CBSSN	W 14–10	15,161
October 21	7:30 pm	at San Diego State	Qualcomm Stadium; San Diego, CA	ESPN2	L 3–42	25,613
October 29	7:30 pm	UNLV	CEFCU Stadium; San Jose, CA	CBSSN	W 30–24	15,733
November 4	7:15 pm	at No. 24 Boise State	Albertsons Stadium; Boise, ID	ESPN2	L 31–45	31,863
November 19	7:30 pm	Air Force	CEFCU Stadium; San Jose, CA	CBSSN	L 38–41	15,533
November 26	12:30 pm	at Fresno State	Bulldog Stadium; Fresno, CA (Valley Cup)	CBSSN	W 16–14	20,991
*Non-conference game; ^{†}Homecoming; Rankings from AP Poll released prior to the game; All times are in Pacific time

== Game summaries ==
=== At Tulsa ===
	1	2	3	4	Total
Spartans	7	0	0	3	10
Golden Hurricane	24	14	7	0	45

- Passing leaders: Kenny Potter (SJSU): 16–28, 234 YDS, 1 TD, 1 INT; Dane Evans (TULSA): 12–23, 198 YDS, 1 TD
- Rushing leaders: Deontae Cooper (SJSU): 19 CAR, 43 YDS; D'Angelo Brewer (TULSA): 22 CAR, 164 YDS, 3 TD
- Receiving leaders: Rahshead Johnson (SJSU): 2 REC, 75 YDS, 1 TD; Keevan Lucas (TULSA): 6 REC, 112 YDS

=== Portland State ===
	1	2	3	4	Total
No. 16 (FCS) Vikings	7	7	7	14	35
Spartans	7	21	24	14	66

- Passing leaders: Kenny Potter (SJSU): 14–20, 233 YDS, 3 TD; Alex Kuresa (PSU): 10–22, 135 YDS, 1 TD, 3 INT
- Rushing leaders: Deontae Cooper (SJSU): 18 CAR, 126 YDS, 1 TD; Paris Penn (PSU): 14 CAR, 137 YDS, 1 TD
- Receiving leaders: Tre Hartley (SJSU): 4 REC, 93 YDS, 1 TD; Alex Kuresa (PSU): 1 REC, 78 YDS, 1 TD

=== Utah ===
	1	2	3	4	Total
Utes	6	14	7	7	34
Spartans	3	7	0	7	17

- Passing leaders: Josh Love (SJSU): 11–21, 184 YDS, 1 TD, 1 INT; Troy Williams (UTAH): 20–28, 257 YDS, 1 TD, 1 INT
- Rushing leaders: Deontae Cooper (SJSU): 12 CAR, 45 YDS; Zack Moss (UTAH): 12 CAR, 95 YDS, 1 TD
- Receiving leaders: Tre Hartley (SJSU): 4 REC, 81 YDS; Tim Patrick (UTAH): 6 REC, 121 YDS, 1 TD

=== at Iowa State ===
	1	2	3	4	Total
Spartans	3	0	7	0	10
Cyclones	10	13	7	14	44

- Passing leaders: Josh Love (SJSU): 13–27, 155 YDS, 1 TD, 4 INT; Jacob Park (ISU): 15–19, 165 YDS, 3 TD
- Rushing leaders: Zamore Zigler (SJSU): 24 CAR, 104 YDS; Mike Warren (ISU): 19 CAR, 103 YDS, 1 TD
- Receiving leaders: Justin Holmes (SJSU): 3 REC, 48 YDS; Deshaunte Jones (ISU): 3 REC, 78 YDS, 2 TD

=== at New Mexico ===
	1	2	3	4	Total
Spartans	13	7	0	21	41
Lobos	14	17	10	7	48

- Passing leaders: Kenny Potter (SJSU): 16–29, 314 YDS, 3 TD, 1 INT; Lamar Jordan (UNM): 4–8, 45 YDS, 1 INT
- Rushing leaders: Zamore Zigler (SJSU): 9 CAR, 91 YDS, 1 TD; Teriyon Gipson (UNM): 11 CAR, 156 YDS, 1 TD
- Receiving leaders: Justin Holmes (SJSU): 4 REC, 99 YDS; Tyrone Owens (UNM): 2 REC, 27 YDS

=== Hawaii ===
	1	2	3	4	Total
Rainbow Warriors	3	21	0	10	34
Spartans	3	7	7	0	17

- Passing leaders: Kenny Potter (SJSU): 16–30, 160 YDS, 1 TD, 3 INT; Dru Brown (HAW): 24–33, 287 YDS, 2 TD
- Rushing leaders: Malik Roberson (SJSU): 19 CAR, 91 YDS; Dru Brown (HAW): 6 CAR, 54 YDS, 1 TD
- Receiving leaders: Billy Freeman (SJSU): 3 REC, 51 YDS; Marcus Kemp (HAW): 6 REC, 69 YDS

=== Nevada ===
	1	2	3	4	Total
Wolf Pack	0	0	3	7	10
Spartans	0	7	0	7	14

- Passing leaders: Kenny Potter (SJSU): 11–17, 142 YDS; Tyler Stewart (NEV): 9–20, 144 YDS, 1 TD, 2 INT
- Rushing leaders: Malik Roberson (SJSU): 35 CAR, 139 YDS; James Butler (NEV): 20 CAR, 94 YDS
- Receiving leaders: Tre Hartley (SJSU): 5 REC, 76 YDS; James Butler (NEV): 3 REC, 92 YDS, 1 TD

=== at San Diego State ===
	1	2	3	4	Total
Spartans	0	3	0	0	3
Aztecs	7	14	21	0	42

- Passing leaders: Kenny Potter (SJSU): 13–29, 104 YDS; Christian Chapman (SDSU): 13–18, 167 YDS, 1 TD, 1 INT
- Rushing leaders: Kenny Potter (SJSU): 9 CAR, 42 YDS; Donnel Pumphrey (SDSU): 24 CAR, 135 YDS, 2 TD
- Receiving leaders: Tre Hartley (SJSU): 3 REC, 46 YDS; Rashaad Penny (SDSU): 2 REC, 64 YDS

=== UNLV ===
	1	2	3	4	Total
Rebels	7	3	7	7	24
Spartans	10	17	3	0	30

- Passing leaders: Kenny Potter (SJSU): 24–39, 292 YDS, 2 TD; Kurt Palandech (UNLV): 10–21, 161 YDS, 1 TD, 1 INT
- Rushing leaders: Zamore Zigler (SJSU): 18 CAR, 77 YDS; Charles Williams (UNLV): 22 CAR, 141 YDS, 1 TD
- Receiving leaders: Tim Crawley (SJSU): 8 REC, 114 YDS; Devonte Boyd (UNLV): 6 REC, 136 YDS

=== at Boise State ===
	1	2	3	4	Total
Spartans	6	10	0	15	31
No. 24 Broncos	7	17	7	14	45

- Passing leaders: Kenny Potter (SJSU): 23–36, 278 YDS, 2 TD, 1 INT; Brett Rypien (BSU): 16–21, 219 YDS, 3 TD
- Rushing leaders: Malik Roberson (SJSU): 12 CAR, 109 YDS, 1 TD; Jeremy McNichols (BSU): 28 CAR, 158 YDS, 2 TD
- Receiving leaders: Justin Holmes (SJSU): 6 REC, 106 YDS, 1 TD; Cedrick Wilson Jr. (BSU): 6 REC, 102 YDS, 2 TD

=== Air Force ===
	1	2	3	4	Total
Falcons	7	10	14	10	41
Spartans	13	10	8	7	38

- Passing leaders: Kenny Potter (SJSU): 25–37, 340 YDS, 2 TD, 2 INT; Arion Worthman (AF): 3–6, 33 YDS, 1 TD, 1 INT
- Rushing leaders: Kenny Potter (SJSU): 22 CAR, 52 YDS, 3 TD; Arion Worthman (AF): 28 CAR, 215 YDS, 2 TD
- Receiving leaders: Tim Crawley (SJSU): 11 REC, 147 YDS; Jalen Robinette (AF): 2 REC, 30 YDS, 1 TD

=== at Fresno State ===
	1	2	3	4	Total
Spartans	7	0	6	3	16
Bulldogs	0	14	0	0	14

- Passing leaders: Kenny Potter (SJSU): 15–25, 111 YDS, 1 TD, 1 INT; Zach Kline (FRES): 10–17, 145 YDS
- Rushing leaders: Deontae Cooper (SJSU): 26 CAR, 126 YDS; Dontel James (FRES): 12 CAR, 42 YDS, 1 TD
- Receiving leaders: Justin Holmes (SJSU): 5 REC, 43 YDS; Aaron Peck (FRES): 6 REC, 63 YDS

== Personnel ==
=== Coaching staff ===
Name	Position	SJSU Years	Alma Mater
Ron Caragher	Head	4th	UCLA '90
Arnold Ale	Linebackers	1st	UCLA '93
Al Borges	Offensive coordinator & quarterbacks	2nd	Chico State '81
Phil Earley	Runningbacks	1st	Pacific Lutheran '80
Ron English	Defensive coordinator	1st	California '91
Dan Ferrigno	Special Teams Coordinator & Tight Ends	2nd	San Francisco State '77
Will Harris	Defensive backs	1st	Southern California '10
Andrew Rolin	Recruiting Coordinator & wide receivers	4th	San Diego '09
Barry Sacks	Defensive line	4th	Montana '80
Adam Stenavich	Offensive line	2nd	Michigan '06
Nicholas Kaspar	Defense	3rd	San Jose State '13
Matt Peleti	Offense	4th	San Diego '13
Vince Hug	Football Operations	1st	Lake Erie '09
Korey Geist	Player Personnel	1st	San Francisco State '15
Gary Uribe	Athletic Performance	4th	La Verne '96
Melanie Hein	Learning Specialist	2nd	San Jose State '96

=== Roster ===
2016 San Jose State Spartans Football
Quarterback: 1 Sam Allen – sophomore (6'3, 204); 5 Kenny Potter – senior (6'2, 208); 7 Montel Aaron – freshman (6'5, 190); 12 Josh Love – freshman (6'2, 199); 14 Michael Carrillo – junior (5'11, 195); Running back: 3 Thomas Tucker – junior (5'10, 202); 6 Deontae Cooper – graduate (5'11, 199); 20 Malik Roberson – sophomore (5'8, 185); 22 Thai Cottrell – sophomore (5'7, 176); 32 Brandon Monroe – junior (6'1, 242); 33 Jamar Williams-Sheppard – freshman (6'2, 215); 34 Zamore Zigler – freshman (5'10, 168); 36 Michael Roots – freshman (5'9, 185); 39 Francoise Sims II – freshman (6'0, 232); 40 Jarrod Lawson – senior (5'8, 192); 49 Shane Smith – senior (6'2, 247); Wide receiver: 2 Tim Crawley – senior (5'7, 169); 8 Rahshead Johnson – sophomore (5'9, 169); 4 Justin Holmes – sophomore (6'2, 211); 11 JaQuan Blackwell – freshman (6'2, 190); 13 Tre Hartley – sophomore (6'0, 183); 15 Tyler Winston – senior (6'2, 200); 80 Ray Surry – freshman (6'2, 195); 82 A'Darrius Wilson – freshman (6'3, 215); 84 Bailey Gaither – freshman (6'1, 179); 85 Brandon Pierce – freshman (5'9, 159); 87 Brendan Lane – freshman (5'10, 181); 88 Nick Inneh – junior (6'1, 190); Tight end: 18 Billy Freeman – senior (6'3, 234); 30 Nico Lima – freshman (6'4, 257); 46 Cameron Woodard – freshman (6'4, 260); 81 Billy Humphreys – freshman (6'5, 230); 86 LeVander Brown – senior (6'4, 247); 89 Josh Oliver – sophomore (6'5, 246)	Offensive lineman: 54 Charles Nelson – sophomore (6'4, 297); 55 Jack Snyder – freshman (6'5, 255); 56 Kyle Hoppe – freshman (6'1, 290); 60 Michael Talafus – senior (6'3, 282); 61 Adam Heigis – freshman (6'6, 280); 62 Jeremiah Kolone – junior (6'3, 301); 65 Trevor Robbins – freshman (6'4, 260); 66 Dominic Fredrickson – freshman (6'3, 297); 68 Keoni Taylor – junior (6'3, 303); 69 Blake Walker – freshman (6'8, 300); 72 Jaelen Lewis – freshman (6'5, 265); 73 Skylar Lacy – graduate (6'6, 305); 74 Chris Gonzalez – junior (6'3, 310); 75 Nate Velichko – junior (6'7, 302); 77 Evan Sarver – senior (6'5, 297); 78 Deano Motes – freshman (6'5, 278); 79 Troy Kowalski – freshman (6'5, 293); Defensive lineman: 36 Malik Hayes – freshman (6'4, 231); 43 Mikal Berry – junior (6'6, 254); 51 Owen Roberts – sophomore (6'2, 285); 53 Isaiah Irving – senior (6'3, 241); 59 Bryson Bridges – sophomore (6'2, 272); 63 Travis Miller – junior (6'4, 296); 67 Nico Aimonetti – junior (6'5, 275); 70 Trevor Bloom – freshman (6'5, 261); 76 Dante Abono – freshman (6'6, 245); 88 Joseph Melo – freshman (6'5, 257); 90 Nick Oreglia – senior (6'3, 281); 91 Lukas Hendricks – freshman (6'5, 259); 92 Keenan Sykes – senior (6'3, 270); 94 Eugene Taylor – senior (6'3, 247); 95 Cameron Alexander – freshman (6'5, 225); 98 Terrell Townsend – freshman (6'5, 256); Long snappers: 48 James Workman – freshman (6'0, 220); 64 Gianfranco Fortino – junior (6'1, 242)	Linebacker: 4 Christian Tago – senior (6'1, 242); 5 Frank Ginda – sophomore (6'0, 241); 11 William Ossai – junior (6'2, 231); 33 Jesse Osuna – freshman (6'0, 224); 42 Alex Manigo – senior (6'0, 231); 44 Mark Amann – senior (6'0, 229); 45 Noah Failauga – freshman (6'1, 225); 50 Blake Walls – freshman (5'11, 215); 54 Epie Sona – senior (5'11, 233); 55 Brett Foley – freshman (6'3, 228); 99 Connor Hollister – freshman (6'2, 215); Defensive back: 3 Jermaine Kelly – junior (6'1, 192); 7 David Williams – sophomore (6'0, 207); 10 Maurice McKnight – junior (6'0, 180); 14 Dehlon Preston – freshman (5'9, 179); 17 Chad Miller – sophomore (6'0, 185); 19 Dakari Monroe – sophomore (5'11, 181); 21 Andre Chachere – junior (6'0, 192); 23 Trevorn Bierria – freshman (6'0, 188); 24 Dominic Barnes – senior (5'11, 202); 25 Chandler Hawkins – sophomore (5'11, 194); 26 Tre Webb – freshman (6'0, 175); 27 Johnathan Lenard Jr. – freshman (6'1, 180); 28 Jeremy Kelly – sophomore (6'2, 185); 29 Cameron Smith – freshman (6'0, 175); 31 Ethan Aguayo – freshman (6'2, 201); 38 Mato Pacheco – freshman (6'0, 165); 40 Matt Torres – freshman (6'0, 180); Placekicker: 35 Jake Lanski – junior (5'10, 195); 37 Matt Barmby – junior (6'2, 195) (+P); Punter: 15 Michael Carrizosa – junior (5'10, 226); 38 Bryce Crawford – sophomore (6'3, 217) (+PK)
