= 2016 Fresno State Bulldogs football team =

American college football season

2016 Fresno State Bulldogs football
- Conference: Mountain West Conference
- West Division
- Record: 1–11 (0–8 MW)
- Head coach: Tim DeRuyter (5th season; first eight games); Eric Kiesau (interim; remainder of season)
- Offensive coordinator: Eric Kiesau (1st season)
- Offensive scheme: Pro-style
- Defensive coordinator: Lorenzo Ward (1st season)
- Base defense: 3–4
- Home stadium: Bulldog Stadium

2016 Mountain West Conference football standings
	Conf.			Overall
Team	W		L	W		L
Mountain Division
Wyoming xy	6	–	2	8	–	6
Boise State x	6	–	2	10	–	3
New Mexico x	6	–	2	9	–	4
Air Force	5	–	3	10	–	3
Colorado State	5	–	3	7	–	6
Utah State	1	–	7	3	–	9
West Division
No. 25 San Diego State xy$	6	–	2	11	–	3
Hawaii	4	–	4	7	–	7
Nevada	3	–	5	5	–	7
San Jose State	3	–	5	4	–	8
UNLV	3	–	5	4	–	8
Fresno State	0	–	8	1	–	11
Championship: San Diego State 27, Wyoming 24
$ – Conference champion; x – Division champion/co-champions; y – Championship game participant; Rankings from AP Poll

The 2016 Fresno State Bulldogs football team represented California State University, Fresno in the 2016 NCAA Division I FBS football season. The Bulldogs were led by fifth-year head coach Tim DeRuyter, but he was fired on October 23 after the team opened the season 1–7; offensive coordinator Eric Kiesau was named interim head coach for the remainder of the season. The team played its home games at Bulldog Stadium and were members of the Mountain West Conference, in the West Division. They finished the season 1–11, 0–8 in Mountain West play to finish in last place in the West Division.

== Schedule ==
Date	Time	Opponent	Site	TV	Result	Attendance
September 3	5:00 pm	at Nebraska*	Memorial Stadium; Lincoln, NE	BTN	L 10–43	90,013
September 10	7:00 pm	Sacramento State*	Bulldog Stadium; Fresno, CA		W 31–3	31,817
September 17	12:00 pm	at Toledo*	Glass Bowl; Toledo, OH	ESPN3	L 17–52	19,379
September 24	1:30 pm	Tulsa*	Bulldog Stadium; Fresno, CA	MW Net	L 41–48 ^{2OT}	23,273
October 1	7:30 pm	at UNLV	Sam Boyd Stadium; Whitney, NV	CBSSN	L 20–45	17,811
October 8	4:00 pm	at Nevada	Mackay Stadium; Reno, NV	ESPN3	L 22–27	22,411
October 14	7:00 pm	San Diego State	Bulldog Stadium; Fresno, CA (Battle for the Oil Can)	CBSSN	L 3–17	24,731
October 22	7:30 pm	at Utah State	Maverik Stadium; Logan, UT	CBSSN	L 20–38	15,067
October 28	7:30 pm	Air Force	Bulldog Stadium; Fresno, CA	ESPN2	L 21–31	25,197
November 5	12:30 pm	at Colorado State	Hughes Stadium; Fort Collins, CO	RTRM	L 0–37	23,187
November 19	4:00 pm	Hawaii	Bulldog Stadium; Fresno, CA (Golden Screwdriver)	MW Net	L 13–14	26,951
November 26	12:30 pm	San Jose State	Bulldog Stadium; Fresno, CA (Valley Cup)	CBSSN	L 14–16	20,991
*Non-conference game; All times are in Pacific time

== Game summaries ==
=== At Nebraska ===
	1	2	3	4	Total
Bulldogs	0	10	0	0	10
Cornhuskers	7	7	7	22	43

=== Sacramento State ===
	1	2	3	4	Total
Hornets	0	3	0	0	3
Bulldogs	7	3	0	21	31

=== At Toledo ===
	1	2	3	4	Total
Bulldogs	0	0	7	10	17
Rockets	14	10	14	14	52

=== Tulsa ===
	1	2	3	4	OT	2OT	Total
Golden Hurricane	0	21	7	13	0	7	48
Bulldogs	21	10	3	7	0	0	41

=== At UNLV ===
	1	2	3	4	Total
Bulldogs	0	7	10	3	20
Rebels	0	21	10	14	45

=== At Nevada ===
	1	2	3	4	Total
Bulldogs	6	0	7	9	22
Wolf Pack	7	14	0	6	27

=== San Diego State ===
	1	2	3	4	Total
Aztecs	3	7	7	0	17
Bulldogs	0	0	3	0	3

=== At Utah State ===
	1	2	3	4	Total
Bulldogs	7	7	3	3	20
Aggies	7	10	7	14	38

Head coach Tim DeRuyter was fired the following day and replaced by offensive coordinator Eric Kiesau.

=== Air Force ===
	1	2	3	4	Total
Falcons	0	7	10	14	31
Bulldogs	7	7	7	0	21

=== At Colorado State ===
	1	2	3	4	Total
Bulldogs	0	0	0	0	0
Rams	10	13	14	0	37

=== Hawaii ===
	1	2	3	4	Total
Rainbow Warriors	0	7	0	7	14
Bulldogs	0	7	3	3	13

=== San Jose State ===
	1	2	3	4	Total
Spartans	7	0	6	3	16
Bulldogs	0	14	0	0	14

== Roster ==
2016 Fresno State Bulldogs football team roster
Players
Coaches
Offense

Pos.	#	Name	Class
WR	1	Jamire Jordan	So
QB	2	James Quentin Davis	Fr
WR	3	KeeSean Johnson	So
RB	4	Deonte Perry	Fr
QB	5	Chason Virgil	RFr
WR	6	Delvon Hardaway	Jr
WR	7	Aaron Peck	RSr
WR	8	Da'Mari Scott	Sr
QB	10	Zach Kline	Sr
RB	11	Dejonte O'Neal	So
WR	13	Justin Allen	So
TE	15	Johnny Rojas III	Fr
TE	16	Jared Rice	RFr
QB	17	Christian Rossi	Jr
WR	18	Darrell Fuery	Jr
WR	19	Frank Dalena	RFr
WR	20	Kevin Parker	Fr
RB	22	Justin Rice	Fr
RB	23	Bryson Oglesby	RFr
RB	24	Saevion Johnson	Fr
RB	25	Austin Harper	Jr
RB	27	Wesley Hill	RFr
RB	28	Dontel James	Jr
RB	29	Treyvon Green	RFr
TE	46	Chad Olsen	Jr
OL	52	Netane Muti	Fr
OL	55	Jaleel Carter	RFr
OL	58	Christian Cronk	So
OL	59	Matt Smith	Fr
OL	62	Logan Hughes	So
OL	68	Timothy Lele'a	Fr
OL	70	Zack Kinninger	RFr
OL	72	Isaiah Trevino	RFr
OL	73	Micah St. Andrew	So
OL	74	Ryan Popolizio	Jr
OL	75	Jacob Vazquez	Sr
OL	76	Shane Gama	Jr
OL	77	Aaron Mitchell	Jr
OL	78	David Patterson	Jr
WR	80	Chris Paz	Fr
TE	82	Donte Coleman	Fr
WR	84	Anthony Grayson	So
WR	85	Jordan Washington	So
TE	86	Stephen Babagian	RFr
WR	87	Michael Martens	Sr
TE	88	David Tangipa	So
TE	89	Kyle Riddering	So

Defense

Pos.	#	Name	Class
DB	2	Jamal Ellis	Sr
DB	4	Mike Bell	RFr
DB	4	Jackson Finch	Jr
DB	5	Dalen Jones	Sr
DB	6	Anthoula Kelly	So
OLB	7	James Bailey	So
MLB	10	Nela Otukolo	So
DB	11	DeShawn Potts	So
DB	15	Stratton Brown	Sr
DE	17	Austin Vaimili	Jr
OLB	19	Brandon Hughes	Sr
LB	22	Trent Soechting	So
DB	23	Juju Hughes	Fr
LB	24	Jeffrey Allison	Fr
LB	24	Tyrell Robinson	Jr
DB	25	Tyquwan Glass	Sr
LB	26	Lukas McKenzie	Fr
DB	26	Alan Wright	Sr
DB	27	Ka'Lonn Milton	So
DB	28	Kenny Gagnon	Fr
LB	30	Messiah Tyler	So
LB	31	Andrew Wright	Fr
MLB	32	Robert Stanley	Jr
LB	33	Josh Hokit	Fr
LB	34	George Helmuth	So
DB	35	Jakeem Fedd	RFr
DB	36	Ryan Alvarez	So
DB	38	Jaron Bryant	Fr
OLB	40	Justin Green	Jr
DB	41	Jalen Smith	RFr
MLB	42	Jeff Camilli	Sr
OLB	43	Michael Goodwin	Fr
OLB	44	Stephen Van Hook	Jr
MLB	46	Dallas Ruth	Fr
LB	48	Tanner Rice	Fr
LB	50	Tainoa Foster	Fr
OLB	56	Tobenna Okeke	Jr
DL	58	Elijah Piper	Fr
DL	79	Nick Aibuedefe	RFr
DL	86	Kyle Hendrickson	So
DL	90	Kevin Atkins	Fr
NG	91	Nathan Madsen	Jr
DL	92	Wyatt McBee	Sr
DL	93	Jasad Haynes	RFr
DL	94	Patrick Belony	RSo
DL	96	Kevin Jeanniton	Fr
DL	97	Malik Forrester	Jr
DL	99	Nick Kristofors	Sr

Special teams

Pos.	#	Name	Class
K	3	Jimmy Camacho	Jr
K	45	Nathan De Jager	Fr
P	47	Blake Cusick	RFr
K	48	Kody Kroening	Jr
K	49	Nick Van Valkenburg	Fr
LS	53	Jacob Westberry	Fr
LS	54	Patrick Williams Jr.	Fr
LS	57	Justin Verrell	Sr

Head coach

- Tim DeRuyter

Coordinators/assistant coaches

- Lorenzo Ward – Associate Head Coach/Defensive Coordinator
- Eric Kiesau – Assistant Head Coach/Offensive Coordinator
- Joe Bernardi – Assistant Coach (Tight Ends)
- Pete Germano – Assistant Coach (Defensive Line)
- Jordan Peterson – Assistant Coach (OLBs/Recruiting Coord.)
- Burl Toler III – Assistant Coach (Wide Receivers)
- Nick Toth – Assistant Coach (Inside Linebackers)
- Dave Ungerer – Assistant Coach (Running Backs & Special Teams Coordinator)
- Mark Weber – Assistant Coach (Offensive Line/Run Game Coordinator)
- Thomas Stallworth – Head Football Strength & Conditioning Coach
- Lou Major – Assistant Athletics Director - Chief of Staff - Football
- Jimmy Morimoto – Director of Player Personnel
- Sean Alston – Graduate Assistant - Defense
- Dylan Cruz – Graduate Assistant - Offense
- Todd Hunt – Graduate Assistant - Defense
- Rob Thompson – Special Teams Quality Control Assistant
- Brad Vonnahme – Offensive Analyst
- Lucas Gingold – Special Teams Quality Control Assistant
- Ryan Springer – Graduate Assistant (Offense)

Legend

- (C) Team captain
- (S) Suspended
- (I) Ineligible
- Injured
- Redshirt

Roster
