= 2016 UNLV Rebels football team =

American college football season

2016 UNLV Rebels football
- Conference: Mountain West Conference
- West Division
- Record: 4–8 (3–5 MW)
- Head coach: Tony Sanchez (2nd season)
- Offensive coordinator: Barney Cotton (2nd season)
- Offensive scheme: Multiple
- Defensive coordinator: Kent Baer (2nd season)
- Base defense: 4–3
- Home stadium: Sam Boyd Stadium

2016 Mountain West Conference football standings
	Conf.			Overall
Team	W		L	W		L
Mountain Division
Wyoming xy	6	–	2	8	–	6
Boise State x	6	–	2	10	–	3
New Mexico x	6	–	2	9	–	4
Air Force	5	–	3	10	–	3
Colorado State	5	–	3	7	–	6
Utah State	1	–	7	3	–	9
West Division
No. 25 San Diego State xy$	6	–	2	11	–	3
Hawaii	4	–	4	7	–	7
Nevada	3	–	5	5	–	7
San Jose State	3	–	5	4	–	8
UNLV	3	–	5	4	–	8
Fresno State	0	–	8	1	–	11
Championship: San Diego State 27, Wyoming 24
$ – Conference champion; x – Division champion/co-champions; y – Championship game participant; Rankings from AP Poll

The 2016 UNLV Rebels football team represented the University of Nevada, Las Vegas (UNLV) as a member of the Mountain West Conference (MW) during the 2016 NCAA Division I FBS football season. Led by second-year head coach Tony Sanchez, the Rebels compiled an overall record of 4–8 record with mark of 3–5 in conference play, placing in a three-way tie for third in the MW's West Division. The team played home games at Sam Boyd Stadium in Whitney, Nevada.

== Schedule ==
Date	Time	Opponent	Site	TV	Result	Attendance
September 1	7:00 p.m.	Jackson State*	Sam Boyd Stadium; Whitney, NV	MWN	W 63–13	18,575
September 10	5:00 p.m.	at UCLA*	Rose Bowl; Pasadena, CA	P12N	L 21–42	63,712
September 17	12:00 p.m.	at Central Michigan*	Kelly/Shorts Stadium; Mount Pleasant, MI	ESPN3	L 21–44	19,922
September 24	6:00 p.m.	Idaho*	Sam Boyd Stadium; Whitney, NV	MWN	L 30–33 ^{OT}	17,229
October 1	7:30 p.m.	Fresno State^{†}	Sam Boyd Stadium; Whitney, NV	CBSSN	W 45–20	17,811
October 8	7:30 p.m.	at San Diego State	Qualcomm Stadium; San Diego, CA	ESPNU	L 7–26	33,296
October 15	9:00 p.m.	at Hawaii	Aloha Stadium; Halawa, HI	KVVU-TV, MWN, Oceanic PPV	W 41–38	31,287
October 22	2:30 p.m.	Colorado State	Sam Boyd Stadium; Whitney, NV	RTRM	L 23–42	18,362
October 29	7:30 p.m.	at San Jose State	CEFCU Stadium; San Jose, CA	CBSSN	L 24–30	15,733
November 12	12:30 p.m.	Wyoming	Sam Boyd Stadium; Whitney, NV	RTRM	W 69–66 ^{3OT}	14,790
November 18	6:00 p.m.	at No. 22 Boise State	Albertsons Stadium; Boise, ID	ESPN2	L 25–42	32,989
November 26	1:00 p.m.	Nevada	Sam Boyd Stadium; Whitney, NV (Fremont Cannon)	ESPN3	L 10–45	23,569
*Non-conference game; ^{†}Homecoming; Rankings from AP Poll released prior to the game; All times are in Pacific time

== Game summaries ==
=== Jackson State ===
Jackson State at UNLV

Team	1	2	3	4	Total
Tigers	7	3	0	3	13
• Rebels	28	14	21	0	63

- Date: September 1, 2016
- Location: Sam Boyd Stadium
  Whitney, NV
- Game start: 7:05 p.m. PDT
- Elapsed time: 3 hours and 20 minutes
- Game attendance: 18,575
- Game weather: Temperature: 99 °F (37 °C) • Weather: 15% Humidity • Wind: SSE 13 MPH
- Referee: Kevin Boitmann
- TV announcers (MWN): Ray Crawford, Caleb Herring and Shae Peppler (sideline)

Scoring summary
1	13:53	UNLV	Devonte Boyd 56–yard pass from Johnny Stanton (Evan Pantels kick)	UNLV 7–0
1	13:04	UNLV	Devonte Boyd 32–yard pass from Johnny Stanton (Evan Pantels kick)	UNLV 14–0
1	08:55	JSU	Tevin Garrett 11–yard pass from LaMontiez Ivy (Christian Jacquemin kick)	UNLV 14–7
1	07:44	UNLV	Lexington Thomas 17–yard run (Evan Pantels kick)	UNLV 21–7
1	00:11	UNLV	Lexington Thomas 3–yard run (Evan Pantels kick)	UNLV 28–7
2	11:27	UNLV	David Greene 1–yard run (Evan Pantels kick)	UNLV 35–7
2	08:16	UNLV	Devonte Boyd 30–yard pass from Johnny Stanton (Evan Pantels kick)	UNLV 42–7
2	01:47	JSU	Christian Jacquemin 27–yard field goal	UNLV 42–10
3	04:17	UNLV	Charles Williams 17–yard run (Evan Pantels kick)	UNLV 49–10
3	03:29	UNLV	Nick Dehdashtian 28–yard fumble return (Evan Pantels kick)	UNLV 56–10
3	02:14	UNLV	Torry McTyer 43–yard interception return (Evan Pantels kick)	UNLV 63–10
4	11:44	JSU	Christian Jacquemin 30–yard field goal	UNLV 63–13

- Passing leaders: JSU – LaMontiez Ivy, 14–34, 134 yards, 1 touchdown, 1 interception and UNLV – Johnny Stanton, 10–12, 217 yards, 3 touchdowns
- Rushing leaders: JSU – Joshua Bates, 8 carries, 32 yards and UNLV – Charles Williams, 12 carries, 96 yards, 1 touchdown
- Receiving leaders: JSU – Carle Ollie, 2 receptions, 39 yards, 1 touchdown and UNLV – Devonte Boyd, 4 receptions, 135 yards, 3 touchdowns
- Tackling leaders: JSU – Javancy Jones, 5 tackles and UNLV – Tau Lotulelei, 6 tackles

=== At UCLA ===
UNLV at UCLA

Team	1	2	3	4	Total
Rebels	7	7	7	0	21
• Bruins	7	21	0	14	42

- Date: September 10, 2016
- Location: Rose Bowl
  Pasadena, CA
- Game start: 5:07 p.m. PDT
- Elapsed time: 3 hours and 9 minutes
- Game attendance: 63,712
- Game weather: Temperature: 84 °F (29 °C) • Weather: Light Haze • Wind: S 10 MPH
- Referee: Chris Coyte
- TV announcers (P12N): Ted Robinson, Yogi Roth and Cindy Brunson (sideline)

Scoring summary
1	08:21	UCLA	Soso Jamabo 3–yard run (J. J. Molson kick)	UCLA 7–0
1	02:15	UNLV	Lexington Thomas 12–yard run (Evan Pantels kick)	TIE 7–7
2	12:45	UCLA	Soso Jamabo 23–yard run (J. J. Molson kick)	UCLA 14–7
2	08:04	UCLA	Mossi Johnson 29–yard pass from Josh Rosen (J. J. Molson kick)	UCLA 21–7
2	03:49	UCLA	Soso Jamabo 7–yard run (J. J. Molson kick)	UCLA 28–7
2	00:37	UNLV	Mekhi Stevenson 14–yard pass from Johnny Stanton (Evan Pantels kick)	UCLA 28–14
3	05:13	UNLV	Johnny Stanton 11–yard run (Evan Pantels kick)	UCLA 28–21
4	11:39	UCLA	Bolu Olorunfunmi 1–yard run (J. J. Molson kick)	UCLA 35–21
4	04:54	UCLA	Josh Rosen 1–yard run (Andrew Strauch kick)	UCLA 42–21

- Passing leaders: UCLA – Josh Rosen, 23–38, 267 yards, 1 touchdown and UNLV – Johnny Stanton, 11–28, 153 yards, 1 touchdown, 2 interceptions
- Rushing leaders: UCLA – Soso Jamabo, 11 carries, 90 yards, 3 touchdowns and UNLV – Lexington Thomas, 19 carries, 112 yards, 1 touchdown
- Receiving leaders: UCLA – Jordan Lasley, 3 receptions, 55 yards and UNLV – Devonte Boyd, 5 receptions, 84 yards
- Tackling leaders: UCLA – Eli Ankou, 8 tackles and UNLV – Ryan McAleenan, 14 tackles

=== At Central Michigan ===
UNLV at Central Michigan

Team	1	2	3	4	Total
Rebels	7	14	0	0	21
• Chippewas	14	14	9	7	44

- Date: September 17, 2016
- Location: Kelly/Shorts Stadium
  Mount Pleasant, MI
- Game start: 3:00 p.m. EDT
- Elapsed time: 3 hours and 35 minutes
- Game attendance: 19,922
- Game weather: Temperature: 76 °F (24 °C) • Weather: Partly Cloudy • Wind: WSW 5–10 MPH
- Referee: Tom Stapleton
- TV announcers (ESPN3): Dan Gutowsky and Dustin Fox

Scoring summary
1	10:32	UNLV	Charles Williams 0–yard blocked punt return (Evan Pantels kick)	UNLV 7–0
1	04:38	CMU	Jesse Kroll 30–yard pass from Cooper Rush (Brian Eavey kick)	TIE 7–7
1	01:35	CMU	Mark Chapman 13–yard pass from Cooper Rush (Brian Eavey kick)	CMU 14–7
2	13:07	UNLV	Lexington Thomas 85–yard run (Evan Pantels kick)	TIE 14–14
2	07:34	UNLV	Darren Woods Jr. 13–yard pass from Johnny Stanton (Evan Pantels kick)	UNLV 21–14
2	05:07	CMU	Mark Chapman 29–yard pass from Cooper Rush (Brian Eavey kick)	TIE 21–21
2	01:51	CMU	Corey Willis 26–yard pass from Cooper Rush (Brian Eavey kick)	CMU 28–21
3	06:34	CMU	Corey Willis 31–yard pass from Cooper Rush (Brian Eavey kick)	CMU 35–21
3	04:40	CMU	Winslow Chapman safety	CMU 37–21
4	14:14	CMU	Brandon Childress 42–yard pass from Cooper Rush (Brian Eavey kick)	CMU 44–21

- Passing leaders: CMU – Cooper Rush, 20–33, 352 yards, 6 touchdowns and UNLV – Johnny Stanton, 15–41, 131 yards, 1 touchdown, 2 interceptions
- Rushing leaders: CMU – Jonathan Ward, 12 carries, 51 yards and UNLV – Lexington Thomas, 17 carries, 113 yards, 1 touchdown
- Receiving leaders: CMU – Corey Willis, 6 receptions, 108 yards, 2 touchdowns and UNLV – Mehki Stevenson, 5 receptions, 48 yards
- Tackling leaders: CMU – Malik Fountain, 9 tackles and UNLV – Troy Hawthorne, 10 tackles

=== Idaho ===
Idaho at UNLV

Team	1	2	3	4	OT	Total
• Vandals	7	10	3	7	6	33
Rebels	0	14	3	10	3	30

- Date: September 24, 2016
- Location: Sam Boyd Stadium
  Whitney, NV
- Game start: 6:05 p.m. PDT
- Elapsed time: 3 hours and 17 minutes
- Game attendance: 17,229
- Game weather: Temperature: 86 °F (30 °C) • Weather: Clear • Wind: ENE 5 MPH
- Referee: Ted Pitts
- TV announcers (MWN): Tony Cordasco and Caleb Herring

Scoring summary
1	10:30	IDAHO	Kaden Elliss 31–yard interception return (Austin Rehkow kick)	IDAHO 7–0
2	11:48	IDAHO	Austin Rehkow 40–yard field goal	IDAHO 10–0
2	09:04	UNLV	Lexington Thomas 3–yard run (Evan Pantels kick)	IDAHO 10–7
2	04:58	IDAHO	Aaron Duckworth 4–yard run (Austin Rehkow kick)	IDAHO 17–7
2	00:59	UNLV	Marc Philippi 4–yard pass from Johnny Stanton (Evan Pantels kick)	IDAHO 17–14
3	11:45	IDAHO	Austin Rehkow 33–yard field goal	IDAHO 20–14
3	06:05	UNLV	Evan Pantels 32–yard field goal	IDAHO 20–17
4	08:29	UNLV	Evan Pantels 24–yard field goal	TIE 20–20
4	06:14	IDAHO	Matt Linehan 7–yard run (Austin Rehkow kick)	IDAHO 27–20
4	05:09	UNLV	Lexington Thomas 55–yard run (Evan Pantels kick)	TIE 27–27
OT	15:00	UNLV	Evan Pantels 23–yard field goal	UNLV 30–27
OT	15:00	IDAHO	Callen Hightower 11–yard pass from Matt Linehan	IDAHO 33–30

- Passing leaders: IDAHO – Matt Linehan, 17–35, 249 yards, 1 touchdown and UNLV – Johnny Stanton, 14–26, 175 yards, 1 touchdown, 2 interceptions
- Rushing leaders: IDAHO – Aaron Duckworth, 20 carries, 90 yards, 1 touchdown and UNLV – Lexington Thomas, 19 carries, 160 yards, 2 touchdowns
- Receiving leaders: IDAHO – Callen Hightower, 4 receptions, 67 yards, 1 touchdown and UNLV – Devonte Boyd, 6 receptions, 64 yards
- Tackling leaders: IDAHO – Ed Hall, 15 tackles and UNLV – Tau Lotulelei, 15 tackles

=== Fresno State ===
Fresno State at UNLV

Team	1	2	3	4	Total
Bulldogs	0	7	10	3	20
• Rebels	0	21	10	14	45

- Date: October 1, 2016
- Location: Sam Boyd Stadium
  Whitney, NV
- Game start: 7:37 p.m. PDT
- Elapsed time: 3 hours and 34 minutes
- Game attendance: 17,811
- Game weather: Temperature: 85 °F (29 °C) • Weather: Fair • Wind: SSW 10 MPH
- Referee: Marvel July
- TV announcers (CBSSN): Dwayne Ballen, Randy Cross and Cassie McKinney (sideline)

Scoring summary
2	10:11	UNLV	Lexington Thomas 1–yard run (Evan Pantels kick)	UNLV 7–0
2	08:40	FS	Aaron Peck 15–yard pass from Chason Virgil (Kody Kroening kick)	TIE 7–7
2	05:44	UNLV	Charles Williams 5–yard run (Evan Pantels kick)	UNLV 14–7
2	02:56	UNLV	Elijah Trosclair 61–yard pass from Dalton Sneed (Evan Pantels kick)	UNLV 21–7
3	08:39	FS	Kody Kroening 42–yard field goal	UNLV 21–10
3	07:38	UNLV	Dalton Sneed 91–yard run (Evan Pantels kick)	UNLV 28–10
3	01:40	UNLV	Evan Pantels 38–yard field goal	UNLV 31–10
3	01:17	FS	Aaron Peck 80–yard pass from Chason Virgil (Kody Kroening kick)	UNLV 31–17
4	11:17	FS	Kody Kroening 47–yard field goal	UNLV 31–20
4	02:29	UNLV	David Greene 9–yard run (Evan Pantels kick)	UNLV 38–20
4	01:32	UNLV	David Greene 16–yard run (Evan Pantels kick)	UNLV 45–20

- Passing leaders: FS – Virgil Chason, 16–45, 296 yards, 2 touchdowns, 1 interception and UNLV – Dalton Sneed, 8–16, 129 yards, 1 touchdown
- Rushing leaders: FS – Dontel James, 18 carries, 53 yards and UNLV – Charles Williams, 18 carries, 153 yards, 1 touchdown
- Receiving leaders: FS – Aaron Peck, 5 receptions, 194 yards, 2 touchdowns and UNLV – Devonte Boyd, 3 receptions, 46 yards
- Tackling leaders: FS – Jeff Camilli, 10 tackles and UNLV – Tau Lotulelei, 10 tackles

=== At San Diego State ===
UNLV at San Diego State

Team	1	2	3	4	Total
Rebels	0	7	0	0	7
• Aztecs	10	3	7	6	26

- Date: October 8, 2016
- Location: Qualcomm Stadium
  San Diego, CA
- Game start: 7:37 p.m. PDT
- Elapsed time: 3 hours and 6 minutes
- Game attendance: 33,296
- Game weather: Temperature: 73 °F (23 °C) • Weather: Fair • Wind: NNW 2 MPH
- Referee: David Alvarez
- TV announcers (ESPNU): Roy Philpott and Tom Ramsey

Scoring summary
1	13:16	SDSU	Rashaad Penny 41–yard pass from Christian Chapman (John Baron II kick)	SDSU 7–0
1	08:16	SDSU	John Baron II 48–yard field goal	SDSU 10–0
2	10:35	UNLV	Dominic Baldwin 20–yard fumble recovery (Evan Pantels kick)	SDSU 10–7
2	01:28	SDSU	John Baron II 50–yard field goal	SDSU 13–7
3	04:50	SDSU	Donnel Pumphrey 9–yard run (John Baron II kick)	SDSU 20–7
4	12:47	SDSU	Rashaad Penny 4–yard run (Christian Chapman pass failed)	SDSU 26–7

- Passing leaders: SDSU – Christian Chapman, 15–20, 215 yards, 1 touchdown and UNLV – Dalton Sneed, 2–12, 9 yards, 1 interception
- Rushing leaders: SDSU – Donnel Pumphrey, 31 carries, 141 yards, 1 touchdown and UNLV – Dalton Sneed, 12 carries, 56 yards
- Receiving leaders: SDSU – Mikah Holder, 3 receptions, 68 yards and UNLV – Devonte Boyd, 2 receptions, 9 yards
- Tackling leaders: SDSU – Damontae Kazee, 5 tackles and UNLV – Troy Hawthorne, 16 tackles

=== At Hawaii ===
UNLV at Hawaii

Team	1	2	3	4	Total
• Rebels	7	14	3	17	41
Rainbow Warriors	7	14	3	14	38

- Date: October 15, 2016
- Location: Aloha Stadium
  Halawa, HI
- Game start: 6:07 p.m.
- Elapsed time: 3 hours and 36 minutes
- Game attendance: 31,287
- Game weather: Temperature: 77 °F (25 °C) • Weather: Light Clouds • Wind: ENE 17 MPH
- Referee: Kevin Hassell
- TV announcers (KVVU-TV/MWN/Oceanic PPV): Robert Kekaula, Rich Miano and Scott Robbs (sideline)

Scoring summary
1	03:37	UNLV	Devonte Boyd 2–yard pass from Dalton Sneed (Evan Pantels kick)	UNLV 7–0
1	00:35	UH	Steven Lakalaka 1–yard run (Rigoberto Sanchez kick)	TIE 7–7
2	10:26	UH	Dakota Torres 3–yard pass from Dru Brown (Rigoberto Sanchez kick)	UH 14–7
2	06:07	UNLV	Lexington Thomas 37–yard pass from Dalton Sneed (Evan Pantels kick)	TIE 14–14
2	02:26	UH	Steven Lakalaka 1–yard run (Rigoberto Sanchez kick)	UH 21–14
2	00:34	UNLV	David Greene 1–yard run (Evan Pantels kick)	TIE 21–21
3	05:10	UNLV	Evan Pantels 18–yard field goal	UNLV 24–21
3	02:15	UH	Rigoberto Sanchez 24–yard field goal	TIE 24–24
4	13:47	UH	Diocemy Saint Juste 7–yard pass from Dru Brown (Rigoberto Sanchez kick)	UH 31–24
4	10:50	UNLV	David Greene 1–yard run (Evan Pantels kick)	TIE 31–31
4	09:02	UH	Paul Harris 7–yard run (Rigoberto Sanchez kick)	UH 38–31
4	04:58	UNLV	Lexington Thomas 34–yard run (Evan Pantels kick)	TIE 38–38
4	00:49	UNLV	Evan Pantels 28–yard field goal	UNLV 41–38

- Passing leaders: UH – Dru Brown, 17–32, 217 yards, 2 touchdowns and UNLV – Dalton Sneed, 19–27, 279 yards, 2 touchdowns
- Rushing leaders: UH – Paul Harris, 7 carries, 94 yards, 1 touchdown and UNLV – Lexington Thomas, 21 carries, 102 yards, 1 touchdown
- Receiving leaders: UH – Marcus Kemp, 6 receptions, 126 yards and UNLV – Devonte Boyd, 6 receptions, 83 yards, 1 touchdown
- Tackling leaders: UH – Jahlani Tavai, 14 tackles and UNLV – Troy Hawthorne, 10 tackles

=== Colorado State ===
Colorado State at UNLV

Team	1	2	3	4	Total
• Rams	14	21	0	7	42
Rebels	0	0	10	13	23

- Date: October 22, 2016
- Location: Sam Boyd Stadium
  Whitney, NV
- Game start: 2:38 p.m. PDT
- Elapsed time: 3 hours and 2 minutes
- Game attendance: 18,362
- Game weather: Temperature: 90 °F (32 °C) • Weather: Sunny • Wind: SE 6 MPH
- Referee: Kevin Boitmann
- TV announcers (RTRM): Drew Goodman, Sherdrick Bonner and Brad Thompson (sideline)

Scoring summary
1	09:03	CSU	Danny Nwosu 8–yard pass from Nick Stevens (Wyatt Bryan kick)	CSU 7–0
1	01:28	CSU	Izzy Matthews 2–yard run (Wyatt Bryan kick)	CSU 14–0
2	05:07	CSU	Izzy Matthews 2–yard run (Wyatt Bryan kick)	CSU 21–0
2	02:02	CSU	Marvin Kinsey Jr. 34–yard run (Wyatt Bryan Kick)	CSU 28–0
2	00:07	CSU	Marvin Kinsey Jr. 2–yard run (Wyatt Bryan Kick)	CSU 35–0
3	12:36	UNLV	Lexington Thomas 37–yard pass from Dalton Sneed (Evan Pantels kick)	CSU 35–7
3	10:15	UNLV	Evan Pantels 27–yard field goal	CSU 35–10
4	12:09	UNLV	David Greene 2–yard run (Evan Pantels kick)	CSU 35–17
4	11:57	CSU	Michael Gallup 36–yard pass from Nick Stevens (Wyatt Bryan kick)	CSU 42–17
4	05:44	UNLV	Mekhi Stevenson 51–yard pass from Dalton Sneed (pass failed)	CSU 42–23

- Passing leaders: CSU – Nick Stevens, 21–28, 237 yards, 2 touchdowns and UNLV – Dalton Sneed, 7–23, 185 yards, 2 touchdowns, 1 interception
- Rushing leaders: CSU – Marvin Kinsey Jr., 10 carries, 68 yards, 2 touchdowns and UNLV – Dalton Sneed, 15 carries, 96 yards
- Receiving leaders: CSU – Michael Gallup, 7 receptions, 91 yards, 1 touchdown and UNLV – Devonte Boyd, 3 receptions, 62 yards
- Tackling leaders: CSU – Kevin Davis, 7 tackles and UNLV – Troy Hawthorne, 12 tackles

=== At San Jose State ===
UNLV at San Jose State

Team	1	2	3	4	Total
Rebels	7	3	7	7	24
• Spartans	10	17	3	0	30

- Date: October 29, 2016
- Location: CEFCU Stadium
  San Jose, CA
- Game start: 7:37 p.m. PDT
- Elapsed time: 3 hours and 40 minutes
- Game attendance: 15,733
- Game weather: Temperature: 65 °F (18 °C) • Weather: Sound Cloud • Wind: SE 10 MPH
- Referee: Eddy Shelton
- TV announcers (CBSSN): Dwayne Ballen, Randy Cross and Taylor Rooks (sideline)

Scoring summary
1	05:21	SJSU	Bryce Crawford 33–yard field goal	SJSU 3–0
1	05:07	UNLV	Charles Williams 75–yard run (Evan Pantels kick)	UNLV 7–3
1	01:41	SJSU	Tim Crawley 12–yard run (Bryce Crawford Kick)	SJSU 10–7
2	14:51	SJSU	Tre Hartley 63–yard pass from Kenny Potter (Bryce Crawford kick)	SJSU 17–7
2	05:44	SJSU	Tre Hartley 29–yard pass from Kenny Potter (Bryce Crawford kick)	SJSU 24–7
2	01:46	UNLV	Evan Pantels 37–yard field goal	SJSU 24–10
2	00:29	SJSU	Bryce Crawford 39–yard field goal	SJSU 27–10
3	08:41	SJSU	Bryce Crawford 44–yard field goal	SJSU 30–10
3	02:40	UNLV	Andrew Price 2–yard pass from Kurt Palandech (Evan Pantels kick)	SJSU 30–17
4	05:19	UNLV	Kurt Palandech 16–yard run (Evan Pantels kick)	SJSU 30–24

- Passing leaders: SJSU – Kenny Potter, 24–39, 292 yards, 2 touchdowns and UNLV – Kurt Palandech, 10–21, 161 yards, 1 touchdown, 1 interception
- Rushing leaders: SJSU – Zamore Zigler, 18 carries, 77 yards and UNLV – Charles Williams, 22 carries, 141 yards, 1 touchdown
- Receiving leaders: SJSU – Tim Crawley, 8 receptions, 114 yards and UNLV – Devonte Boyd, 6 receptions, 136 yards
- Tackling leaders: SJSU – Christian Tago, 14 tackles and UNLV – Tau Lotulelei, 12 tackles

=== Wyoming ===
Wyoming at UNLV

Team	1	2	3	4	OT	2OT	3OT	Total
Cowboys	3	21	7	21	7	7	0	66
• Rebels	10	20	7	15	7	7	3	69

- Date: November 12, 2016
- Location: Sam Boyd Stadium
  Whitney, NV
- Game start: 12:38 p.m. PST
- Elapsed time: 3 hours and 47 minutes
- Game attendance: 14,790
- Game weather: Temperature: 75 °F (24 °C) • Weather: Partly Cloudy • Wind: NE 5 MPH
- Referee: Marvel July
- TV announcers (RTRM): Drew Goodman, Sherdrick Bonner and Brad Thompson (sideline)

Scoring summary
1	10:15	UNLV	Evan Pantels 30–yard field goal	UNLV 3–0
1	08:07	WYO	Cooper Rothe 46–yard field goal	TIE 3–3
1	05:00	UNLV	Jericho Flowers 34–yard run (Evan Pantels kick)	UNLV 10–3
2	14:18	WYO	Brian Hill 6–yard run (Cooper Rothe kick)	TIE 10–10
2	14:02	WYO	Logan Wilson 0–yard fumble recovery (Cooper Rothe kick)	WYO 17–10
2	07:09	UNLV	David Greene 27–yard run (Evan Pantels kick)	TIE 17–17
2	05:46	UNLV	Evan Pantels 25–yard field goal	UNLV 20–17
2	05:29	UNLV	Xzaviar Campbell 18–yard pass from Kurt Palandech (Evan Pantels kick)	UNLV 27–17
2	01:04	WYO	Tanner Gentry 48–yard pass from Josh Allen (Cooper Rothe kick)	UNLV 27–24
2	00:01	UNLV	Evan Pantels 27–yard field goal	UNLV 30–24
3	10:37	UNLV	Xzaviar Campbell 1–yard run (Evan Pantels kick)	UNLV 37–24
3	06:10	WYO	Brian Hill 15–yard run (Cooper Rothe kick)	UNLV 37–31
4	13:18	UNLV	David Greene 1–yard run (Nicolai Bornand kick)	UNLV 44–31
4	12:40	WYO	Tanner Gentry 45–yard pass from Josh Allen (Cooper Rothe kick)	UNLV 44–38
4	10:58	WYO	Austin Conway 60–yard punt return (Cooper Rothe kick)	WYO 45–44
4	10:38	UNLV	Kurt Palandech 76–yard run (Elijah Trosclair pass)	UNLV 52–45
4	00:00	WYO	Tanner Gentry 19–yard pass from Josh Allen (Cooper Rothe kick)	TIE 52–52
OT	15:00	WYO	Brian Hill 15–yard run (Cooper Rothe kick)	WYO 59–52
OT	15:00	UNLV	Jericho Flowers 22–yard pass from Kurt Palandech (Nicolai Bornand kick)	TIE 59–59
2OT	15:00	UNLV	Andrew Price 4–yard pass from Kurt Palandech (Nicolai Bornand kick)	UNLV 66–59
2OT	15:00	WYO	Jacob Hollister 19–yard pass from Josh Allen (Cooper Rothe kick)	TIE 66–66
3OT	15:00	UNLV	Nicolai Bornand 40–yard field goal	UNLV 69–66

- Passing leaders: UNLV – Kurt Palandech, 20–32, 252 yards, 3 touchdowns and WYO – Josh Allen, 14–31, 334 yards, 4 touchdowns, 2 interceptions
- Rushing leaders: UNLV – Kurt Palandech, 16 carries, 157 yards, 1 touchdown and WYO – Brian Hill, 23 carries, 119 yards, 3 touchdowns
- Receiving leaders: UNLV – Devonte Boyd, 10 receptions, 127 yards and WYO – Tanner Gentry, 5 receptions, 184 yards, 3 touchdowns
- Tackling leaders: UNLV – Tau Lotulelei, 12 tackles and WYO – Lucas Wacha, 16 tackles

=== At Boise State ===
UNLV at Boise State

Team	1	2	3	4	Total
Rebels	3	7	7	8	25
• Broncos	14	7	14	7	42

- Date: November 18, 2016
- Location: Albertsons Stadium
  Boise, ID
- Game start: 7:05 p.m. MST
- Elapsed time: 3 hours and 23 minutes
- Game attendance: 32,989
- Game weather: Temperature: 47 °F (8 °C) • Weather: Mostly Cloudy • Wind: ESE 15 MPH
- Referee: Kevin Mar
- TV announcers (ESPN2): Adam Amin, Kelly Stouffer and Molly McGrath (sideline)

Scoring summary
1	11:01	UNLV	Evan Pantels 21–yard field goal	UNLV 3–0
1	02:43	BSU	Brett Rypien 1–yard run (Tyler Rausa kick)	BSU 7–3
1	00:38	BSU	Jeremy McNichols 6–yard run (Tyler Rausa kick)	BSU 14–3
2	07:37	BSU	Jeremy McNichols 1–yard run (Tyler Rausa kick)	BSU 21–3
2	01:43	UNLV	Kurt Palandech 7–yard run (Evan Pantels kick)	BSU 21–10
3	12:48	BSU	Alexander Mattison 3–yard run (Tyler Rausa kick)	BSU 28–10
3	08:01	BSU	Jeremy McNichols 4–yard run (Tyler Rausa kick)	BSU 35–10
3	00:03	UNLV	Kurt Palandech 9–yard run (Evan Pantels kick)	BSU 35–17
4	08:40	BSU	Jeremy McNichols 31–yard run (Tyler Rausa kick)	BSU 42–17
4	01:41	UNLV	Andrew Price 45–yard pass from Kurt Palandech (rush)	BSU 42–25

- Passing leaders: BSU – Brett Rypien, 10–20, 109 yards and UNLV – Kurt Palandech, 10–20, 113 yards, 1 touchdown
- Rushing leaders: BSU – Jeremy McNichols, 31 carries, 206 yards, 4 touchdowns and UNLV – Kurt Palandech, 9 carries, 64 yards, 2 touchdowns
- Receiving leaders: BSU – Thomas Sperbeck, 5 receptions, 47 yards and UNLV – Andrew Price, 3 receptions, 65 yards, 1 touchdown
- Tackling leaders: BSU – Darren Lee, 11 tackles and UNLV – Tau Lotulelei, 11 tackles

=== Nevada ===
Nevada at UNLV

Team	1	2	3	4	Total
• Wolf Pack	10	17	3	15	45
Rebels	0	10	0	0	10

- Date: November 26, 2016
- Location: Sam Boyd Stadium
  Whitney, NV
- Game start: 1:04 p.m. PST
- Elapsed time: 2 hours and 56 minutes
- Game attendance: 23,569
- Game weather: Temperature: 66 °F (19 °C) • Weather: Fair • Wind: ENE 5 MPH
- Referee: Daniel Romeo
- TV announcers (ESPN3): Dave Raymond and Tyoka Jackson

Scoring summary
1	10:48	NEV	Ty Gangi 19–yard run (Spencer Pettit kick)	NEV 7–0
1	07:14	NEV	Spencer Pettit 25–yard field goal	NEV 10–0
2	14:50	NEV	James Butler 33–yard run (Spencer Pettit kick)	NEV 17–0
2	12:22	UNLV	Kurt Palandech 27–yard run (Evan Pantels Kick)	NEV 17–7
2	06:58	NEV	Spencer Pettit 32–yard field goal	NEV 20–7
2	02:05	NEV	James Butler 14–yard pass from Ty Gangi (Spencer Pettit kick)	NEV 27–7
2	00:00	UNLV	Evan Pantels 47–yard field goal	NEV 27–10
3	09:16	NEV	Spencer Pettit 38–yard field goal	NEV 30–10
4	11:02	NEV	James Butler 3–yard run (Hasaan Henderson pass)	NEV 38–10
4	02:31	NEV	James Butler 13–yard run (Spencer Pettit kick)	NEV 45–10

- Passing leaders: NEV – Ty Gangi, 15–22, 193 yards, 1 touchdown and UNLV – Kurt Palandech, 9–22, 270 yards, 1 interception
- Rushing leaders: NEV – James Butler, 32 carries, 196 yards, 3 touchdowns and UNLV – Kurt Palandech, 14 carries, 98 yards, 1 touchdown
- Receiving leaders: NEV – Wyatt Demps, 2 receptions, 57 yards and UNLV – Trevor Kanteman, 2 receptions, 39 yards
- Tackling leaders: NEV – Gabriel Sewell, 8 tackles and UNLV – Troy Hawthorne, 15 tackles
