= 2016 Utah State Aggies football team =

American college football season

2016 Utah State Aggies football
- Conference: Mountain West Conference
- Mountain Division
- Record: 3–9 (1–7 MW)
- Head coach: Matt Wells (4th season)
- Co-offensive coordinators: Jovon Bouknight (3rd season); Luke Wells (4th season)
- Offensive scheme: Spread
- Co-defensive coordinators: Frank Maile (1st season); Kendrick Shaver (3rd season)
- Base defense: 3–3–5
- Home stadium: Maverik Stadium

2016 Mountain West Conference football standings
	Conf.			Overall
Team	W		L	W		L
Mountain Division
Wyoming xy	6	–	2	8	–	6
Boise State x	6	–	2	10	–	3
New Mexico x	6	–	2	9	–	4
Air Force	5	–	3	10	–	3
Colorado State	5	–	3	7	–	6
Utah State	1	–	7	3	–	9
West Division
No. 25 San Diego State xy$	6	–	2	11	–	3
Hawaii	4	–	4	7	–	7
Nevada	3	–	5	5	–	7
San Jose State	3	–	5	4	–	8
UNLV	3	–	5	4	–	8
Fresno State	0	–	8	1	–	11
Championship: San Diego State 27, Wyoming 24
$ – Conference champion; x – Division champion/co-champions; y – Championship game participant; Rankings from AP Poll

The 2016 Utah State Aggies football team represented Utah State University in the 2016 NCAA Division I FBS football season. The Aggies were led by fourth-year head coach Matt Wells and played their home games at Merlin Olsen Field at Maverik Stadium. This was Utah State's fourth season as members of the Mountain West Conference in the Mountain Division. They finished the season 3–9, 1–7 in Mountain West play to finish in last place in the Mountain Division.

== Schedule ==
Date	Time	Opponent	Site	TV	Result	Attendance
September 1	6:00 pm	Weber State*	Maverik Stadium; Logan, UT	MW Net/Twitter	W 45–6	23,008
September 10	12:00 pm	at USC*	Los Angeles Memorial Coliseum; Los Angeles, CA	P12N	L 7–45	62,487
September 16	7:00 pm	Arkansas State*	Maverik Stadium; Logan, UT	CBSSN	W 34–20	21,091
September 24	8:15 pm	Air Force	Maverik Stadium; Logan, UT	ESPNU	L 20–27	23,104
October 1	8:15 pm	at No. 24 Boise State	Albertsons Stadium; Boise, ID	ESPN2	L 10–21	36,602
October 8	8:00 pm	at Colorado State	Hughes Stadium; Fort Collins, CO	CBSSN	L 24–31	32,387
October 22	8:30 pm	Fresno State	Maverik Stadium; Logan, UT	CBSSN	W 38–20	15,067
October 28	6:00 pm	San Diego State	Maverik Stadium; Logan, UT	CBSSN	L 13–40	17,332
November 5	8:15 pm	at Wyoming	War Memorial Stadium; Laramie, WY (Bridger's Battle)	ESPN2	L 28–52	17,837
November 12	8:15 pm	New Mexico	Maverik Stadium; Logan, UT	ESPN2	L 21–24	15,212
November 19	2:00 pm	at Nevada	Mackay Stadium; Reno, NV	ESPN3	L 37–38	13,390
November 26	8:15 pm	at BYU*	LaVell Edwards Stadium; Provo, UT (The Old Wagon Wheel/Beehive Boot)	ESPNU	L 10–28	53,603
*Non-conference game; Rankings from AP Poll released prior to game; All times are in Mountain time

Schedule source:

== Game summaries ==
=== Weber State ===
	1	2	3	4	Total
Wildcats	0	6	0	0	6
Aggies	14	7	10	14	45

=== At USC ===
	1	2	3	4	Total
Aggies	0	0	7	0	7
Trojans	7	14	10	14	45

=== Arkansas State ===
	1	2	3	4	Total
Red Wolves	0	0	14	6	20
Aggies	17	7	3	7	34

=== Air Force ===
	1	2	3	4	Total
Falcons	3	14	0	10	27
Aggies	7	3	0	10	20

=== At Boise State ===
	1	2	3	4	Total
Aggies	0	3	0	7	10
#24 Broncos	7	0	7	7	21

=== At Colorado State ===
	1	2	3	4	Total
Aggies	14	10	0	0	24
Rams	10	0	14	7	31

=== Fresno State ===
	1	2	3	4	Total
Bulldogs	7	7	3	3	20
Aggies	7	10	7	14	38

=== San Diego State ===
	1	2	3	4	Total
Aztecs	10	10	3	17	40
Aggies	7	0	0	6	13

=== At Wyoming ===
	1	2	3	4	Total
Aggies	0	7	21	0	28
Cowboys	14	21	7	10	52

=== New Mexico ===
	1	2	3	4	Total
Lobos	0	6	15	3	24
Aggies	14	0	7	0	21

=== At Nevada ===
	1	2	3	4	Total
Aggies	7	10	10	10	37
Wolf Pack	3	7	7	21	38

=== At BYU ===
	1	2	3	4	Total
Aggies	3	7	0	0	10
Cougars	0	14	7	7	28
