= 2016 Boise State Broncos football team =

American college football season

2016 Boise State Broncos football

MW Mountain Division co-champion

Cactus Bowl, L 12–31 vs. Baylor
- Conference: Mountain West Conference
- Mountain Division
- Record: 10–3 (6–2 MW)
- Head coach: Bryan Harsin (3rd season)
- Co-offensive coordinators: Zak Hill (1st season); Scott Huff (1st season)
- Offensive scheme: Multiple
- Defensive coordinator: Andy Avalos (1st season)
- Base defense: Multiple
- Home stadium: Albertsons Stadium

2016 Mountain West Conference football standings
	Conf.			Overall
Team	W		L	W		L
Mountain Division
Wyoming xy	6	–	2	8	–	6
Boise State x	6	–	2	10	–	3
New Mexico x	6	–	2	9	–	4
Air Force	5	–	3	10	–	3
Colorado State	5	–	3	7	–	6
Utah State	1	–	7	3	–	9
West Division
No. 25 San Diego State xy$	6	–	2	11	–	3
Hawaii	4	–	4	7	–	7
Nevada	3	–	5	5	–	7
San Jose State	3	–	5	4	–	8
UNLV	3	–	5	4	–	8
Fresno State	0	–	8	1	–	11
Championship: San Diego State 27, Wyoming 24
$ – Conference champion; x – Division champion/co-champions; y – Championship game participant; Rankings from AP Poll

The 2016 Boise State Broncos football team represented Boise State University during the 2016 NCAA Division I FBS football season. It marked the Broncos' 80th season overall, sixth as a member of the Mountain West Conference and fourth within the Mountain Division. They played their home games at Albertsons Stadium in Boise, Idaho. They were led by third-year head coach Bryan Harsin. They finished the season 10–3, 6–2 in Mountain West play to finish in a three-way tie for the Mountain Division title. After tiebreakers, they did not represent the Mountain Division in the Mountain West Championship Game. They were invited to the Cactus Bowl where they lost to Baylor.

This season marked the 30th anniversary season that the Broncos have played on the Blue Turf.

== Preseason ==
=== Award watch lists ===
Listed in the order that they were released.

Maxwell Award – So. QB Brett Rypien & Jr. RB Jeremy McNichols

Mackey Award – Jr. TE Jake Roh

Lou Groza Award – Sr. K Tyler Rausa

Bronko Nagurski Trophy – Sr. LB Tanner Vallejo

Butkus Award – Sr. LB Tanner Vallejo

Fred Biletnikoff Award – Sr. WR Thomas Sperbeck

Davey O'Brien Award – So. QB Brett Rypien

Doak Walker Award – Jr. RB Jeremy McNichols

Walter Camp Award – So. QB Brett Rypien

=== Mountain West media days ===
At the Mountain West media days, held at the Cosmopolitan in Las Vegas, Nevada, the Broncos were picked as the overwhelming favorites to win the Mountain Division title, receiving 27 of a possible 29 first place votes. So. QB Brett Rypien, Sr. WR Thomas Sperbeck and Sr. K Tyler Rausa were selected to the all-conference first team.

=== Media poll ===
==== Mountain Division ====
1. Boise State – 172 (27)
2. Air Force – 126 (2)
3. Utah State – 95
4. Colorado State – 95
5. New Mexico – 74
6. Wyoming – 31

== Schedule ==
Date	Time	Opponent	Rank	Site	TV	Result	Attendance
September 3	10:00 a.m.	at Louisiana–Lafayette*		Cajun Field; Lafayette, LA	ASN/ESPN3	W 45–10	22,661
September 10	8:15 p.m.	Washington State*		Albertsons Stadium; Boise, ID	ESPN2	W 31–28	36,163
September 24	1:30 p.m.	at Oregon State*		Reser Stadium; Corvallis, OR	FS1	W 38–24	42,846
October 1	8:15 p.m.	Utah State	No. 24	Albertsons Stadium; Boise, ID	ESPN2	W 21–10	36,602
October 7	7:00 p.m.	at New Mexico	No. 19	University Stadium; Albuquerque, NM	CBSSN	W 49–21	20,090
October 15	8:15 p.m.	Colorado State^{†}	No. 15	Albertsons Stadium; Boise, ID	ESPN2	W 28–23	33,448
October 20	8:15 p.m.	BYU*	No. 14	Albertsons Stadium; Boise, ID	ESPN	W 28–27	34,575
October 29	5:00 p.m.	at Wyoming	No. 13	War Memorial Stadium; Laramie, WY	CBSSN	L 28–30	26,023
November 4	8:15 p.m.	San Jose State	No. 24	Albertsons Stadium; Boise, ID	ESPN2	W 45–31	31,863
November 12	5:00 p.m.	at Hawaii	No. 22	Aloha Stadium; Honolulu, HI	CBSSN	W 52–16	22,731
November 18	7:00 p.m.	UNLV	No. 20	Albertsons Stadium; Boise, ID	ESPN2	W 42–25	32,989
November 25	1:30 p.m.	at Air Force	No. 19	Falcon Stadium; Colorado Springs, CO	CBSSN	L 20–27	23,556
December 27	8:15 p.m.	vs. Baylor*		Chase Field; Phoenix, AZ (Cactus Bowl)	ESPN	L 12–31	33,328
*Non-conference game; ^{†}Homecoming; Rankings from AP Poll and CFP Rankings after November 1 released prior to game; All times are in Mountain time

Schedule source:

== Roster ==
2016 Boise State Broncos football team roster
Players
Coaches
Offense

Pos.	#	Name	Class
WR	1	Cedrick Wilson Jr.	Jr
WR	2	Julian Carter	Fr
QB	3	Thomas Stuart	Jr
QB	4	Brett Rypien	So
WR	5	Garrett Collingham	Fr
WR	6	Chaz Anderson	Sr
QB	7	Anthony Upshaw	So
WR	8	Sean Modster	So
WR	9	Bryan Jefferson	Fr
RB	10	Cory Young	So
RB	13	Jeremy McNichols	Jr
QB	14	Camron Humphrey	Fr
QB	15	Jake Constantine	Fr
WR	16	Taylor Pope	Sr
WR	17	Austin Cottrell	Jr
WR	18	Bubba Ogbebor	Fr
RB	20	Jake Roper	Fr
RB	22	Alexander Mattison	Fr
RB	26	Devan Demas	Sr
WR	28	A. J. Richardson	So
RB	30	Ryan Wolpin	Jr
RB	34	Robert Mahone	Fr
RB	39	Jake Shaddox	Fr
TE	47	Matt Pistone	Fr
OL	52	Andrew Tercek	Jr
OL	59	Mason Hampton	Jr
OL	60	Kellen Buhr	Sr
OL	64	Ben Vering	Fr
OL	66	Mario Yakoo	Sr
OL	67	Garrett Larson	Fr
OL	69	Austin Dixon	Fr
OL	70	Steven Baggett	Sr
OL	71	Donte Harrington	Fr
OL	72	Will Adams	Sr
OL	73	Travis Averill	Sr
OL	74	Archie Lewis	Jr
OL	75	Kole Bailey	Fr
OL	76	Ezra Cleveland	Fr
OL	77	John Molchon	Fr
OL	78	Andres Preciado	So
OL	79	Eric Quevedo	Fr
WR	80	Christian Blaser	Fr
WR	81	Akilian Butler	So
WR	82	Thomas Sperbeck	Sr
WR	83	David McKinzie	Jr
TE	84	Jake Knight	So
TE	85	John Bates	Fr
TE	86	Chase Blakley	So
TE	87	Alec Dhaenans	Jr
TE	88	Jake Roh	Jr
WR	89	Brock Barr	Jr
TE	93	Nick Crabtree	Fr

Defense

Pos.	#	Name	Class
CB	2	Jonathan Moxey	Sr
S	3	Chanceller James	Sr
CB	4	DeAndre Pierce	Fr
MLB	7	Joe Martarano	Jr
DE	8	Jabril Frazier	So
OLB	9	Desmond Williams	Fr
S	10	Kekoa Nawahine	Fr
CB	14	Tyler Horton	So
S	15	Evan Tyler	Fr
S	17	Jalen Walker	Fr
OLB	20	Tanner Vallejo	Sr
S	22	Hayden Israelson	Fr
S	23	Damion Wright	Fr
LB	24	Kameron Miles	Jr
CB	25	Raymond Ford	Sr
CB	26	Avery Williams	Fr
CB	27	Reid Harrison-Ducros	Fr
CB	30	Robert Lewis	Fr
S	31	Skyler Seibold	So
S	32	Jordan Happle	Fr
OLB	33	Gabe Perez	Jr
MLB	34	Solo Taylor	Fr
DE	35	Derriyon Shaw	Fr
OLB	36	Blake Whitlock	Jr
S	37	Cameron Hartsfield	Jr
OLB	38	Leighton Vander Esch	So
DE	40	Jabari Watson	Fr
OLB	41	Will Heffner	Fr
MLB	43	Joe Provenzano	So
MLB	44	Darren Lee	Sr
DE	45	Kayode Rufai	Fr
S	47	Ma'a Tanuvasa	Fr
MLB	48	Bruno DeRose	Fr
OLB	51	Ben Weaver	Sr
DE	53	Sam Whitney	Fr
DT	54	Matt Locher	Fr
DT	55	David Moa	So
DL	56	Dane Kordopatis	Fr
DT	57	Emmanuel Fesili	Fr
MLB	58	Tyson Maeva	Fr
DT	90	Daniel Auelua	Jr
DE	91	Durrant Miles	So
DT	92	Paul Semons	So
DT	93	Chase Hatada	Fr
DE	94	Sam McCaskill	Sr
OLB	95	Nick Provenzano	Fr
DT	96	Elliot Hoyte	Sr
DT	97	J Aguirre	Jr
DT	98	Sonatane Lui	Fr
DE	99	Curtis Weaver	Fr

Special teams

Pos.	#	Name	Class
P	19	Sean Wale	Sr
LS	42	Matt Cota	Jr
K	46	Joel Velazquez	Fr
K	49	Tyler Rausa	Sr
LS	50	Nicholai Pitman	Fr

Head coach

- Bryan Harsin

Coordinators/assistant coaches

- Kent Riddle – Associate head coach/Special teams coordinator/Tight ends
- Steve Caldwell – Associate head coach/Defensive linemen
- Zak Hill – Offensive coordinator/Quarterbacks
- Andy Avalos – Defensive coordinator
- Scott Huff – Co-offensive coordinator/Offensive linemen
- Junior Adams – Passing game coordinator/Wide receivers
- Lee Marks – Running backs
- Ashley Ambrose – Defensive backs
- Gabe Franklin – Safeties
- Jeff Pitman – Director, Strength and Conditioning
- D. J. Harper – Graduate assistant
- Latu Heimuli – Graduate assistant
- Nate Potter – Graduate assistant

Legend

- (C) Team captain
- (S) Suspended
- (I) Ineligible
- Injured
- Redshirt

Roster
Last update: 8/14/23

== Game summaries ==
=== At Louisiana–Lafayette ===
	1	2	3	4	Total
Broncos	14	21	3	7	45
Ragin' Cajuns	0	3	0	7	10

Uniform Combination
Helmet	Jersey	Pants

- Passing leaders: Brett Rypien (BSU): 22–33, 347 YDS, 2 TD; Anthony Jennings (ULL): 21–33, 186 YDS, 1 TD.
- Rushing leaders: Alexander Mattison (BSU): 11 CAR, 61 YDS, 1 TD; Elijah McGuire (ULL): 14 CAR, 46 YDS.
- Receiving leaders: Thomas Sperbeck (BSU): 6 REC, 130 YDS, 1 TD; Ja'Marcus Bradley (ULL): 3 REC, 50 YDS.

=== Washington State ===
	1	2	3	4	Total
Cougars	0	7	7	14	28
Broncos	14	3	7	7	31

Uniform Combination
Helmet	Jersey	Pants

- Passing leaders: Brett Rypien (BSU): 19–35, 299 YDS, 1 TD, 3 INT; Luke Falk (WSU): 55–71, 480 YDS, 4 TD, 1 INT.
- Rushing leaders: Jeremy McNichols (BSU): 22 CAR, 116 YDS, 2 TD; Jamal Morrow (WSU): 8 CAR, 22 YDS.
- Receiving leaders: Thomas Sperbeck (BSU): 7 REC, 133 YDS, 1 TD; Tavares Martin Jr. (WSU): 12 REC, 158 YDS, 1 TD.

=== At Oregon State ===
	1	2	3	4	Total
Broncos	14	17	0	7	38
Beavers	7	0	10	7	24

Uniform Combination
Helmet	Jersey	Pants

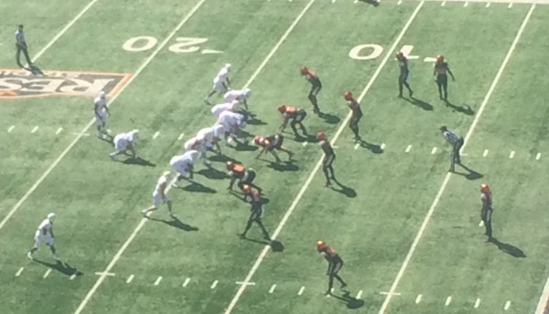
Boise State on offense in the first half.

- Passing leaders: Brett Rypien (BSU): 19–36, 215 YDS, 1 TD; Conor Blount (OSU): 11–18, 138 YDS.
- Rushing leaders: Jeremy McNichols (BSU): 28 CAR, 208 YDS, 3 TD; Ryan Nall (OSU): 14 CAR, 66 YDS, 2 TD.
- Receiving leaders: Thomas Sperbeck (BSU): 6 REC, 104 YDS; Seth Collins (OSU): 9 REC, 106 YDS.

=== Utah State ===
	1	2	3	4	Total
Aggies	0	3	0	7	10
Broncos	7	0	7	7	21

Uniform Combination
Helmet	Jersey	Pants

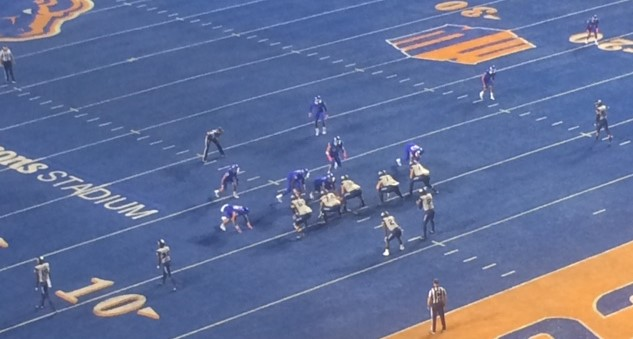
Boise State on defense in the 4th quarter.

- Passing leaders: Brett Rypien (BSU): 15–24, 163 YDS, 2 TD; Kent Myers (USU): 29–50, 287 YDS, 1 TD.
- Rushing leaders: Jeremy McNichols (BSU): 30 CAR, 132 YDS; Kent Myers (USU): 12 CAR, 47 YDS.
- Receiving leaders: Jeremy McNichols (BSU): 6 REC, 73 YDS, 1 TD; Andrew Rodriguez (USU): 6 REC, 89 YDS, 1 TD.

=== At New Mexico ===
	1	2	3	4	Total
No. 19 Broncos	14	28	7	0	49
Lobos	7	0	0	14	21

Uniform Combination
Helmet	Jersey	Pants

- Passing leaders: Brett Rypien (BSU): 21–28, 391 YDS, 5 TD; Lamar Jordan (UNM): 4–14, 39 YDS, 1 TD, 1 INT.
- Rushing leaders: Jeremy McNichols (BSU): 21 CAR, 54 YDS, 2 TD; Lamar Jordan (UNM): 21 CAR, 139 YDS.
- Receiving leaders: Thomas Sperbeck (BSU): 9 REC, 198 YDS, 2 TD; Matt Quarells (UNM): 1 REC, 13 YDS.

=== Colorado State ===
	1	2	3	4	Total
Rams	3	0	0	20	23
No. 15 Broncos	0	7	14	7	28

Uniform Combination
Helmet	Jersey	Pants

- Passing leaders: Brett Rypien (BSU): 16–24, 207 YDS, 1 TD; Nick Stevens (CSU): 17–31, 184 YDS, 2 TD.
- Rushing leaders: Jeremy McNichols (BSU): 40 CAR, 217 YDS, 2 TD; Dalyn Dawkins (CSU): 14 CAR, 66 YDS.
- Receiving leaders: Thomas Sperbeck (BSU): 5 REC, 72 YDS, 1 TD; Michael Gallup (CSU): 4 REC, 91 YDS, 1 TD.

=== BYU ===
	1	2	3	4	Total
Cougars	0	17	7	3	27
No. 14 Broncos	14	7	0	7	28

Uniform Combination
Helmet	Jersey	Pants

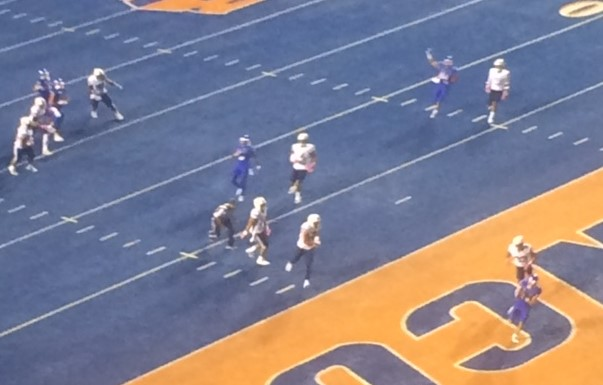
Thomas Sperbeck (bottom right) catching a 2nd QRT. TD

- Passing leaders: Brett Rypien (BSU): 25–39, 442 YDS, 3 TD, 2 INT; Taysom Hill (BYU): 21–42, 187 YDS.
- Rushing leaders: Jeremy McNichols (BSU): 30 CAR, 140 YDS, 1 TD; Squally Canada (BYU): 21 CAR, 88 YDS.
- Receiving leaders: Jeremy McNichols (BSU): 5 REC, 109 YDS, 1 TD and Tyler Sperbeck 9 REC, 109 YDS, 1 TD; Mitchell Juergens (BYU): 4 REC, 57 YDS.

=== At Wyoming ===
	1	2	3	4	Total
No. 13 Broncos	7	14	0	7	28
Cowboys	0	17	0	13	30

Uniform Combination
Helmet	Jersey	Pants

- Passing leaders: Brett Rypien (BSU): 22–35, 295 YDS, 1 INT; Josh Allen (WYO): 18–31, 274 YDS, 3 TD, 1 INT.
- Rushing leaders: Jeremy McNichols (BSU): 18 CAR, 143 YDS, 2 TD; Brian Hill (WYO): 28 CAR, 146 YDS.
- Receiving leaders: Cedrick Wilson Jr. (BSU): 4 REC, 84 YDS; Jacob Hollister (WYO): 6 REC, 144 YDS, 2 TD.

=== San Jose State ===
	1	2	3	4	Total
Spartans	6	10	0	15	31
No. 24 Broncos	7	17	7	14	45

Uniform Combination
Helmet	Jersey	Pants

- Passing leaders: Brett Rypien (BSU): 16–21, 219 YDS, 3 TD; Kenny Potter (SJSU): 23–36, 278 YDS, 2 TD, 1 INT.
- Rushing leaders: Jeremy McNichols (BSU): 28 CAR, 158 YDS, 2 TD; Malik Roberson (SJSU): 12 CAR, 109 YDS, 1 TD.
- Receiving leaders: Cedrick Wilson (BSU): 6 REC, 102 YDS, 2 TD; Justin Holmes (SJSU): 6 REC, 106 YDS, 1 TD.

=== At Hawaii ===
	1	2	3	4	Total
No. 24 Broncos	14	21	10	7	52
Rainbow Warriors	0	3	3	10	16

Uniform Combination
Helmet	Jersey	Pants

- Passing leaders: Brett Rypien (BSU): 18–22, 338 YDS, 4 TD; Dru Brown (UH): 16–31, 125 YDS, 1 TD.
- Rushing leaders: Jeremy McNichols (BSU): 16 CAR, 153 YDS, 2 TD; Paul Harris (UH): 14 CAR, 145 YDS.
- Receiving leaders: Cedrick Wilson (BSU): 7 REC, 141 YDS, 1 TD; Dakota Torres (UH): 3 REC, 35 YDS.

=== UNLV ===
	1	2	3	4	Total
Rebels	3	7	7	8	25
No. 23 Broncos	14	7	14	7	42

Uniform Combination
Helmet	Jersey	Pants

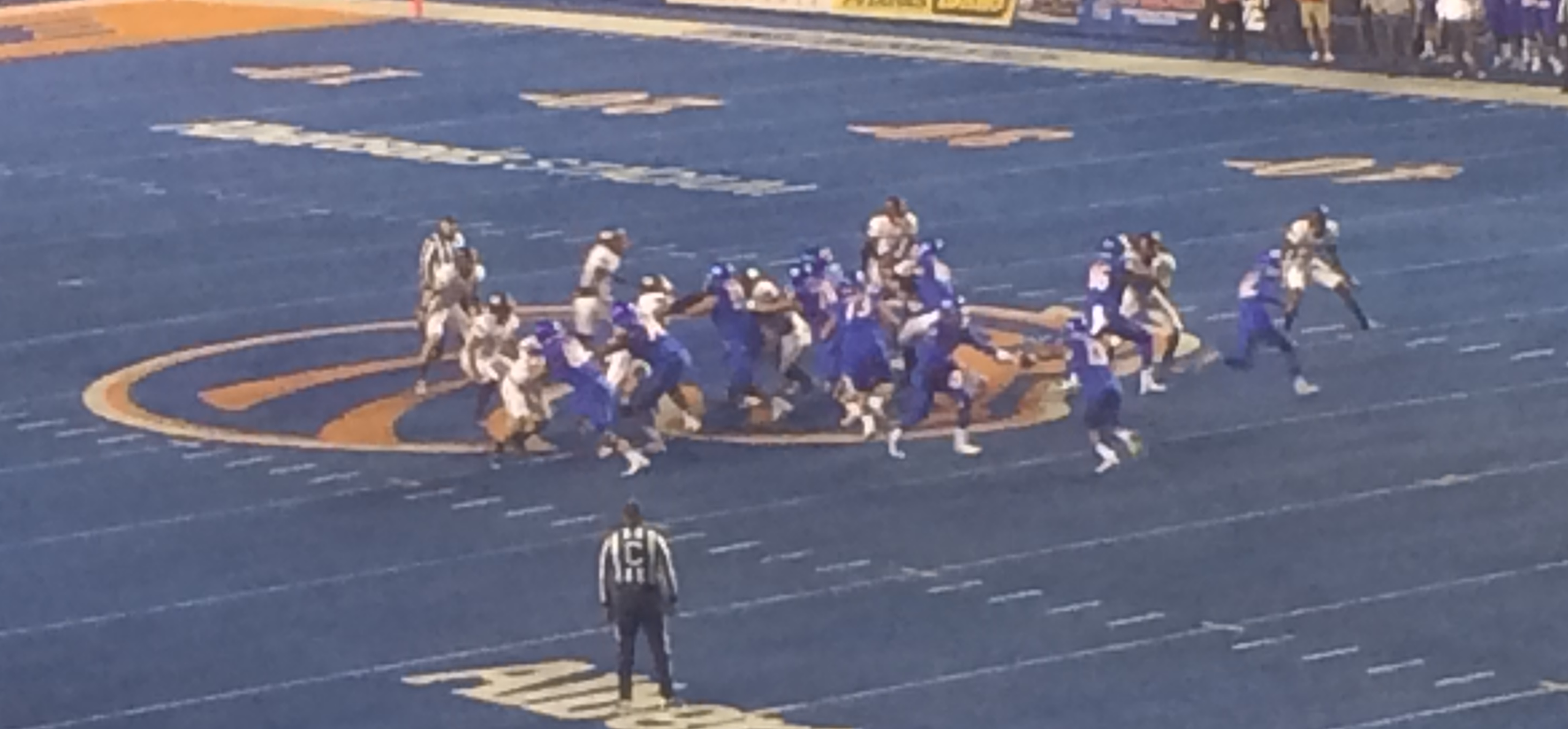
Boise State on offense in the 1st half.

- Passing leaders: Brett Rypien (BSU): 10–20, 109 YDS; Kurt Palandech (UNLV): 10–20, 113 YDS, 1 TD.
- Rushing leaders: Jeremy McNichols (BSU): 31 CAR, 206 YDS, 4 TD; Kurt Palandech (UNLV): 9 CAR, 64 YDS, 2 TD.
- Receiving leaders: Thomas Sperbeck (BSU): 5 REC, 47 YDS; Andrew Price (UNLV): 3 REC, 65 YDS, 1 TD.

=== At Air Force ===
	1	2	3	4	Total
No. 19 Broncos	7	3	3	7	20
Falcons	7	10	7	3	27

Uniform Combination
Helmet	Jersey	Pants

- Passing leaders: Brett Rypien (BSU): 9–26, 316 YDS, 1 TD; Arion Worthman (AF): 3–5, 45 YDS.
- Rushing leaders: Jeremy McNichols (BSU): 22 CAR, 88 YDS, 1 TD; Arion Worthman (AF): 26 CAR, 80 YDS.
- Receiving leaders: Cedrick Wilson (BSU): 4 REC, 193 YDS, 1 TD; Jalen Robinette (AF): 3 REC, 45 YDS.

Air Force became the first team to beat Boise State for three consecutive season since Nevada in 1996–98.

=== Baylor–Cactus Bowl ===
	1	2	3	4	Total
Broncos	0	6	0	6	12
Bears	7	14	3	7	31

Uniform Combination
Helmet	Jersey	Pants

- Passing leaders: Brett Rypien (BSU): 32–51, 305 YDS, 1 TD, 2 INT; Zach Smith (BAY): 28–39, 375 YDS, 3 TD, 1 INT.
- Rushing leaders: Jeremy McNichols (BSU): 19 CAR, 46 YDS; Terence Williams (BAY): 25 CAR, 103 YDS.
- Receiving leaders: Cedrick Wilson (BSU): 6 REC, 88 YDS, 1 TD; K. D. Cannon (BAY): 14 REC, 226 YDS, 2 TD.

== Rankings ==
Ranking movements Legend: ██ Increase in ranking ██ Decrease in ranking — = Not ranked RV = Received votes
	Week															
Poll	Pre	1	2	3	4	5	6	7	8	9	10	11	12	13	14	Final
AP	RV	RV	RV	RV	24	19	15	14	13	24	24	22	20	RV	RV	RV
Coaches	RV	RV	RV	RV	RV	19	15	14	13	24	24	23	19	RV	RV	RV
CFP	Not released									24	22	20	19	—	—	Not released

== Scores by quarter ==
All opponents

	1	2	3	4	Total
Boise State	126	151	72	90	439
Opponents	40	91	44	128	303

Mountain West opponents

	1	2	3	4	Total
Boise State	70	97	62	56	285
MW Opponents	26	50	17	90	183

== Post-season awards ==
=== Mountain West first team ===
Offense

Brett Rypien – So. QB

Thomas Sperbeck – Sr. WR

Travis Averill – Sr. OL

Mario Yakoo – Sr. OL

Defense

Sam McCaskill – Sr. DL

David Moa – So. DL

=== Mountain West second team ===
Offense

Jeremy McNichols – Jr. RB

Defense

Ben Weaver – Sr. LB

Chanceller James – Sr. DB

Jonathan Moxey – Sr. DB

Sean Wale – Sr. P

=== Mountain West honorable mention ===
Steven Baggett – Sr. OL

Mason Hampton – Jr. OL

Tanner Vallejo – Sr. LB

Cedrick Wilson Jr. – Jr. WR

Award Reference:
