= 2016 Air Force Falcons football team =

American college football season

2016 Air Force Falcons football

Arizona Bowl champion

Arizona Bowl, W 45–21 vs. South Alabama
- Conference: Mountain West Conference
- Mountain Division
- Record: 10–3 (5–3 MW)
- Head coach: Troy Calhoun (10th season)
- Offensive coordinator: Mike Thiessen (8th season)
- Offensive scheme: Triple-option / spread hybrid
- Defensive coordinator: Steve Russ (5th season)
- Base defense: 3–4
- Captains: Weston Steelhammer; Jacobi Owens; Nate Romine; Patrick Healy
- Home stadium: Falcon Stadium

Uniform
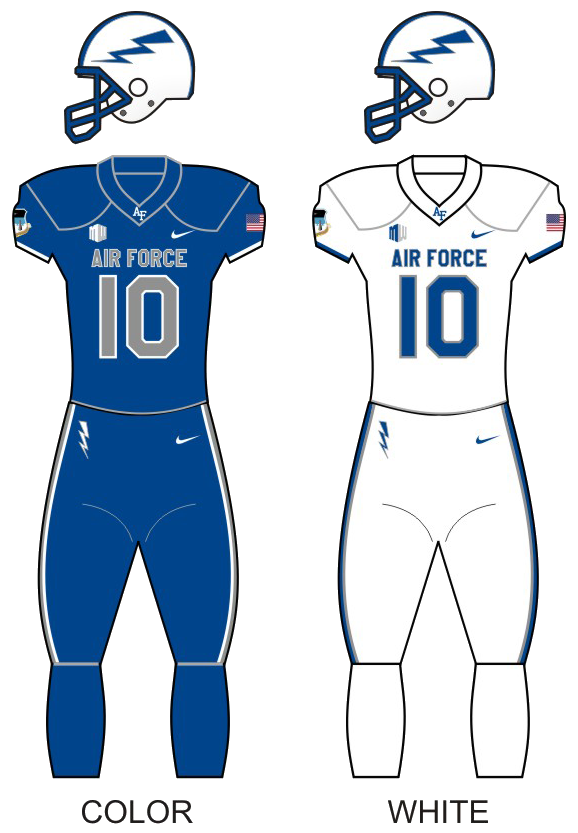

2016 Mountain West Conference football standings
	Conf.			Overall
Team	W		L	W		L
Mountain Division
Wyoming xy	6	–	2	8	–	6
Boise State x	6	–	2	10	–	3
New Mexico x	6	–	2	9	–	4
Air Force	5	–	3	10	–	3
Colorado State	5	–	3	7	–	6
Utah State	1	–	7	3	–	9
West Division
No. 25 San Diego State xy$	6	–	2	11	–	3
Hawaii	4	–	4	7	–	7
Nevada	3	–	5	5	–	7
San Jose State	3	–	5	4	–	8
UNLV	3	–	5	4	–	8
Fresno State	0	–	8	1	–	11
Championship: San Diego State 27, Wyoming 24
$ – Conference champion; x – Division champion/co-champions; y – Championship game participant; Rankings from AP Poll

The 2016 Air Force Falcons football team represented the United States Air Force Academy as a member of the Mountain Division in the Mountain West Conference (MW) during the 2016 NCAA Division I FBS football season. Led by tenth-year head coach Troy Calhoun, the Falcons compiled an overall record of 10–3 with a mark of 5–3 in conference play, tying for fourth place in the MW's Mountain Division. Air Force was invited to the Arizona Bowl, where the Falcons defeated South Alabama. The team played home games at Falcon Stadium in Colorado Springs, Colorado

== Schedule ==
Air Force is to play Boise State, Colorado State and Hawaii at home and Fresno State, San Jose State, Utah State and Wyoming on the road, but the official dates and kickoff times are scheduled to be released within the coming weeks of February 2016.

Date	Time	Opponent	Site	TV	Result	Attendance
September 3	12:00 p.m.	Abilene Christian*	Falcon Stadium; Colorado Springs, CO	MW Net, Twitter	W 37–21	34,128
September 10	12:00 p.m.	Georgia State*	Falcon Stadium; Colorado Springs, CO	MW Net, Twitter	W 48–14	24,173
September 24	8:15 p.m.	at Utah State	Maverik Stadium; Logan, UT	ESPNU	W 27–20	23,104
October 1	1:30 p.m.	Navy*	Falcon Stadium; Colorado Springs, CO (Commander-in-Chief's Trophy)	CBSSN	W 28–14	43,063
October 8	1:30 p.m.	at Wyoming	War Memorial Stadium; Laramie, WY	RTRM	L 26–35	28,623
October 15	1:30 p.m.	vs. New Mexico	Cotton Bowl; Dallas, TX	ESPNews	L 40–45	18,756
October 22	12:00 p.m.	Hawaii	Falcon Stadium; Colorado Springs, CO (rivalry)	MW Net	L 27–34 ^{2OT}	29,132
October 28	7:30 p.m.	at Fresno State	Bulldog Stadium; Fresno, CA	ESPN2	W 31–21	25,197
November 5	10:00 a.m.	at Army*	Michie Stadium; West Point, NY (Commander-in-Chief's Trophy)	CBSSN	W 31–12	38,443
November 12	8:15 p.m.	Colorado State	Falcon Stadium; Colorado Springs, CO (rivalry)	ESPNU	W 49–46	23,467
November 19	7:30 p.m.	at San Jose State	CEFCU Stadium; San Jose, CA	CBSSN	W 41–38	15,533
November 25	1:30 p.m.	No. 19 Boise State	Falcon Stadium; Colorado Springs, CO	CBSSN	W 27–20	23,556
December 30	3:30 p.m.	vs. South Alabama*	Arizona Stadium; Tucson, AZ (Arizona Bowl)	ASN	W 45–21	33,868
*Non-conference game; Rankings from AP Poll and CFP Rankings after November 1 released prior to game; All times are in Mountain time

== Game summaries ==
=== Abilene Christian ===
	1	2	3	4	Total
Wildcats	0	7	7	7	21
Falcons	7	21	0	9	37

=== Georgia State ===
	1	2	3	4	Total
Panthers	7	7	0	0	14
Falcons	10	17	14	7	48

=== At Utah State ===
	1	2	3	4	Total
Falcons	3	14	0	10	27
Aggies	7	3	0	10	20

=== Navy ===
	1	2	3	4	Total
Midshipmen	0	0	0	14	14
Falcons	0	3	14	11	28

=== At Wyoming ===
	1	2	3	4	Total
Falcons	0	6	7	13	26
Cowboys	7	7	14	7	35

=== vs New Mexico ===
	1	2	3	4	Total
Lobos	14	21	10	0	45
Falcons	10	17	7	6	40

=== Hawaii ===
	1	2	3	4	OT	2OT	Total
Rainbow Warriors	0	10	3	7	7	7	34
Falcons	7	0	6	7	7	0	27

=== At Fresno State ===
	1	2	3	4	Total
Falcons	0	7	10	14	31
Bulldogs	7	7	7	0	21

=== At Army ===
	1	2	3	4	Total
Falcons	0	10	14	7	31
Black Knights	0	6	6	0	12

=== Colorado State ===
	1	2	3	4	Total
Rams	14	10	14	8	46
Falcons	7	21	14	7	49

=== At San Jose State ===
	1	2	3	4	Total
Falcons	7	10	14	10	41
Spartans	13	10	8	7	38

=== Boise State ===
	1	2	3	4	Total
#19 Broncos	7	3	3	7	20
Falcons	7	10	7	3	27

This marked the first time since Nevada, Air Force has beaten Boise State three straight years

=== Vs. South Alabama–Arizona Bowl ===
	1	2	3	4	Total
Jaguars	14	7	0	0	21
Falcons	3	18	17	7	45

== Coaching staff ==
Name	Position	Consecutive seasons at Air Force in current position
Troy Calhoun	Head coach	10th
Steve Russ	Defensive coordinator / defensive backs / associate head coach	4th, 5th
Mike Thiessen	Offensive coordinator / quarterbacks coach	10th
Clay Hendrix	Offensive line / associate head coach	10th
Matt McGettigan	Strength and conditioning coach	10th
Ron Vanderlinden	Inside linebackers coach	3rd
Matt Weikert	Outside linebackers coach	10th
Jake Campbell	Backfield assistant coach	5th, 10th
Tim Cross	Defensive line coach	3rd
Ben Miller	Running backs coach / special teams coordinator	10th, 11th
Steed Lobotzke	Tight ends coach	2nd
John Rudzinski	Secondary coach	7th
Maj. Ross Weaver	Assistant offensive line	3rd
Jake Moreland	Receivers coach	5th
Steve Senn	Director of recruiting and player personnel	11th
Maj. Dylan Newman	Defensive assistant and senior military rep.	2nd
Chis Miller	Director of football video operations	2nd
Janel Mitchell	Administrative assistant	1st
Scott Richardson	Equipment supervisor and head football equipment manager	1st
Ernest "Ernie" Sedelmyer	Athletic football trainer	17th
Mark Peters	Athletic trainer	2nd
