= 2016 San Diego State Aztecs football team =

American college football season

2016 San Diego State Aztecs football

Mountain West champion MW West Division champion Las Vegas Bowl champion

MW Championship Game, W 27–24 at Wyoming

Las Vegas Bowl, W 34–10 vs. Houston
- Conference: Mountain West Conference
- West Division

Ranking
- Coaches: No. 25
- AP: No. 25
- Record: 11–3 (6–2 MW)
- Head coach: Rocky Long (6th season)
- Offensive coordinator: Jeff Horton (2nd season)
- Offensive scheme: Pro-style
- Defensive coordinator: Rocky Long (8th season)
- Base defense: 3–3–5
- Home stadium: Qualcomm Stadium

2016 Mountain West Conference football standings
	Conf.			Overall
Team	W		L	W		L
Mountain Division
Wyoming xy	6	–	2	8	–	6
Boise State x	6	–	2	10	–	3
New Mexico x	6	–	2	9	–	4
Air Force	5	–	3	10	–	3
Colorado State	5	–	3	7	–	6
Utah State	1	–	7	3	–	9
West Division
No. 25 San Diego State xy$	6	–	2	11	–	3
Hawaii	4	–	4	7	–	7
Nevada	3	–	5	5	–	7
San Jose State	3	–	5	4	–	8
UNLV	3	–	5	4	–	8
Fresno State	0	–	8	1	–	11
Championship: San Diego State 27, Wyoming 24
$ – Conference champion; x – Division champion/co-champions; y – Championship game participant; Rankings from AP Poll

The 2016 San Diego State Aztecs football team represented San Diego State University in the 2016 NCAA Division I FBS football season. The Aztecs were led by sixth-year head coach Rocky Long and played their home games at Qualcomm Stadium. They were members of the West Division of the Mountain West Conference. They finished the season 11–3, 6–2 in Mountain West play to be champions of the West Division. They represented the West Division in the Mountain West Championship Game where they defeated Wyoming to be crowned Mountain West champions for the second consecutive year. They were invited to the Las Vegas Bowl where they defeated Houston.

== Schedule ==
Date	Time	Opponent	Rank	Site	TV	Result	Attendance
September 3	5:30 p.m.	No. 22 (FCS) New Hampshire*		Qualcomm Stadium; San Diego, CA		W 31–0	46,486
September 10	7:30 p.m.	California*		Qualcomm Stadium; San Diego, CA	CBSSN	W 45–40	42,473
September 17	12:30 p.m.	at Northern Illinois*		Huskie Stadium; DeKalb, IL	CBSSN	W 42–28	14,513
October 1	5:00 p.m.	at South Alabama*	No. 19	Ladd–Peebles Stadium; Mobile, AL	ESPNews	L 24–42	14,471
October 8	7:30 p.m.	UNLV		Qualcomm Stadium; San Diego, CA	ESPNU	W 26–7	33,296
October 14	7:00 p.m.	at Fresno State		Bulldog Stadium; Fresno, CA (rivalry)	CBSSN	W 17–3	24,731
October 21	7:30 p.m.	San Jose State		Qualcomm Stadium; San Diego, CA	ESPN2	W 42–3	25,613
October 28	5:00 p.m.	at Utah State		Maverik Stadium; Logan, UT	CBSSN	W 40–13	17,332
November 5	4:00 p.m.	Hawaii^{†}		Qualcomm Stadium; San Diego, CA	CBSSN	W 55–0	41,644
November 12	7:30 p.m.	at Nevada		Mackay Stadium; Reno, NV	CBSSN	W 46–16	16,730
November 19	1:30 p.m.	at Wyoming	No. 24	War Memorial Stadium; Laramie, WY	CBSSN	L 33–34	19,112
November 26	6:00 p.m.	Colorado State		Qualcomm Stadium; San Diego, CA	CBSSN	L 31–63	34,223
December 3	4:45 p.m.	at Wyoming		War Memorial Stadium; Laramie, WY (Mountain West Conference Championship Game)	ESPN	W 27–24	24,001
December 17	12:30 p.m.	vs. Houston*		Sam Boyd Stadium; Whitney, NV (Las Vegas Bowl)	ABC	W 34–10	29,286
*Non-conference game; ^{†}Homecoming; Rankings from AP Poll released prior to the game; All times are in Pacific time

== Personnel ==
=== Roster ===
2016 San Diego State Aztecs Football
Quarterback: 9 Ryan Agnew – (redshirt) Freshman (6′0, 185); 10 Christian Chapman – Sophomore (6′0, 200); 13 Daniel Prieto – Sophomore (5′11, 165); 14 Mason Hall – (redshirt) Freshman (6′3, 195); 17 Casey Brown – Freshman (6′0, 170); 18 Jimmy Walker – Junior (6′3, 220); Tailback: 19 Donnel Pumphrey – Senior (5′9, 180); 20 Rashaad Penny – Junior (5′11, 220); 22 Chase Jasmin – Freshman (5′11, 185); 26 Marcus Stamps – Junior (6′1, 215); 29 Juwan Washington – (redshirt) Freshman (5′7, 175); 44 Chad Woolsey – Sophomore (6′1, 205); 45 Tyler Wormhoudt – Freshman (6′1, 205); Fullback: 15 Nick Bawden – Junior (6′3, 240); 34 Isaac Lessard – (redshirt) Freshman (6′3, 230); 35 Grady Vazquez – Freshman (6′1, 225); 38 Alex Valenzuela – Freshman (6′0, 240); 41 Dakota Turner – Junior (6′3, 250); Wide receiver: 2 Christian Cumberlander – Junior (6′3, 205); 4 Kendrick Mathis – Senior (6′0, 195); 5 Chase Favreau – Junior (6′1, 200); 6 Mikah Holder – Junior (6′0, 180); 36 Josh Hill – Sophomore (6′0, 180); 37 Liam Cabrera – (redshirt) Freshman (5′10, 190); 41 Dominic Rose – (redshirt) Freshman (6′2, 190); 43 Kaylen Williams – Freshman (6′4, 180); 47 Marc Ellis – Junior (6′0, 190); 48 Taylor Dodds – (redshirt) Freshman (6′2, 190); 81 Eric Judge – Senior (6′1, 195); 85 Quest Truxton – Junior (6′0, 180); 86 Jerry Chaney – (redshirt) Freshman (6′0, 190); 92 Isiah Macklin – Freshman (6′5, 200); 93 Timothy Wilson Jr. – Freshman (6′4, 190); 97 Curtis Anderson III – Senior (6′3, 200); Placekicker: 29 John Baron II – Sophomore (5′11, 190) (+P); 59 Conor Perkins – Freshman (5′11, 168); Punter: 91 Tanner Blain – Senior (6′0, 205); 96 Neil Boudreau – Freshman (6′3, 200)	Tight end: 49 Troy Artopoeus – Freshman (6′3, 230); 82 Parker Houston – Freshman (6′3, 240); 83 Kyle Spalding – Freshman (6′6, 270); 84 Darryl Richardson – Junior (6′5, 255); 87 Kahale Warring – (redshirt) Freshman (6′6, 245); 88 David Wells – Junior (6′5, 255); 89 Daniel Brunskill – Senior (6′5, 260); Offensive lineman: 51 Zachary Oblea – Freshman (6′2, 260); 53 Douglas Tucker II – Freshman (6′5, 300); 56 Nico Siragusa – Senior (6′5, 330); 57 Dominic O'Brien – (redshirt) Freshman (6′4, 290); 60 Keith Ismael – Freshman (6′3, 310); 62 Nick Gerhard – (redshirt) Freshman (6′5, 300); 63 Trenton Fincher – Freshman (6′8, 340); 64 Ryan Krum – Senior (6′4, 320); 66 Jordan Becar – Freshman (6′4, 315); 67 Antonio Rosales – Junior (6′4, 295); 70 Arthur Flores – Senior (6′5, 305); 71 Andre Beltran - Freshman (6’4, 255); 72 Derrick Achayo – Junior (6′4, 285); 73 Alfonso Solis – (redshirt) Freshman (6′2, 280); 74 Tyler Roemer – Freshman (6′7, 305); 75 Kwayde Miller – Senior (6′7, 315); 76 Zachary Thomas – Freshman (6′5, 270); 77 Ryan Pope – (redshirt) Sophomore (6′7, 320); 78 Joe Salcedo – Sophomore (6′7, 295); 79 Daishawn Dixon – (redshirt) Freshman (6′5, 340); Defensive lineman: 45 Fred Melifonwu – Junior (6′5, 250); 46 Jay Henderson – Junior (6′2, 230); 51 Sam Tai – (redshirt) Senior (6′3, 280); 55 Chibu Onyeukwu – Junior (6′4, 240); 58 Alex Barrett – Senior (6′3, 255); 59 Kyle Kelley – Senior (6′3, 260); 61 Damon Moore – Sophomore (6′4, 245); 65 Sergio Phillips – Junior (6′2, 295); 68 Myles Cheatum – (redshirt) Freshman (6′2, 265); 90 Julian Rochelin – Sophomore (6′5, 245); 94 Jondarius Gardner – Junior (6′4, 295); 95 Noble Hall – Sophomore (6′3, 265); 96 Thomas Browne – (redshirt) Freshman (6′4, 255); 97 Jay Williams – Freshman (6′3, 240); 99 Forrest Hanlon – Freshman (6′2, 240)	Linebacker: 34 John Carroll – (redshirt) Freshman (6′2, 225); 38 Dru Mathis – Freshman (6′3, 205); 39 Ronley Lakalaka – Sophomore (6′0, 225); 40 Randy Ricks – Senior (6′5, 230); 42 Troy Cassidy – Freshman (6′3, 210); 43 Austin Wyatt-Thayer – Senior (6′5, 230); 44 Kyahva Tezino – (redshirt) Freshman (6′0, 230); 47 Kaelin Himphill – Freshman (6′2, 225); 49 Josh Bringuel – Freshman (6′4, 225); 52 Tyler Morris – Junior (6′3, 225); 53 Temerick Harper – Junior (6′1, 225); 54 Calvin Munson – Senior (6′1, 245); 57 Ryan Munn – Junior (6′3, 230); 98 Reggie Murphy – (redshirt) Freshman (6′5, 250); Cornerback: 17 Ron Smith – (redshirt) Freshman (6′0, 170); 22 Kalan Montgomery – Junior (6′1, 185); 23 Damontae Kazee – Senior (5′11, 190); 24 Billy Vaughn Jr. – Junior (6′1, 190); 27 Kyree Woods – Freshman (6′0, 175); 30 Garrett Binkley – (redshirt) Freshman (5′9, 170); 31 Derek Babiash – Junior (6′1, 190); 32 Tayler Hawkins – Freshman (6′1, 185); 35 Kevin Walcott – Junior (5′11, 195); Safety: 3 Trey Lomax – Junior (5′11, 195); 7 Kameron Kelly – Junior (6′2, 195); 10 Jeff Clay – (redshirt) Freshman (6′0, 195); 11 Will Stricklin II – Freshman (6′0, 200); 12 Malik Smith – Senior (6′0, 190); 14 Parie Dedeaux Jr. – Freshman (6′1, 180); 16 Dwayne Parchment – (redshirt) Freshman (5′11, 190); 18 Trenton Thompson – Freshman (6′2, 185); 21 Na'im McGee – Senior (6′0, 200); 33 Parker Baldwin – Sophomore (6′2, 21; 36 Keoni Stallworth – Freshman (6′1, 190); 37 Dwayne Johnson Jr. – Freshman (6′2, 190); 48 Israel Cabrera – (redshirt) Freshman (5′10, 180); 80 Brandon Fitzpatrick – (redshirt) Freshman (6′3, 190); Long Snappers: 50 Turner Bernard – Freshman (6′1, 200); 69 Ryan Simmons – (redshirt) Freshman (6′1, 210)

=== Coaching staff ===
Name	Position	Seasons at San Diego State	Alma Mater
Rocky Long	Head coach	6	New Mexico (1974)
Jeff Horton	Offensive coordinator/Associate head coach/Running backs	6	Minnesota (1984)
Bobby Hauck	Associate head coach/Special Teams Coordinator	2	Montana (1987)
Zach Arnett	Assistant coach/Linebackers Coach	3	New Mexico (2009)
Hunkie Cooper	Assistant coach/wide receivers	2	UNLV (1991)
Danny Gonzales	Assistant coach/Safeties	6	New Mexico (1999)
Ernest Lawson	Assistant coach/Defensive line	1	SDSU (2010)
Blane Morgan	Assistant coach/quarterbacks	2	Air Force (1999)
Mike Schmidt	Assistant coach/Offensive line	5	SDSU (2009)
Tony White	Assistant coach/cornerbacks/recruiting coordinator	8	UCLA (2002)ll
Kevin McGarry	Director of player personnel	6	San Diego
Jashon Sykes	Assistant Athletic Director – Football Operations	4	Colorado (2002)
Doug Deakin	Assistant for Football Operations	5	SDSU (2010)
Jake LaudenSlayer	Graduate Assistant – Offense/Tight ends	3	CLU (2011)
Zach Schultis	Graduate Assistant – Offense	3	CLU (2013)
Zach Shapiro	Graduate Assistant – Defense	2	SDSU (2010)
Demetrius Sumler	Graduate Assistant – Defense	1	Colorado (2011)
Adam Hall	Assistant Athletic Director for Strength and Conditioning	6	SDSU (2004)
Derrick Baker	Assistant strength and conditioning coach	2	Cal (2015)

== Game summaries ==
=== New Hampshire ===
	1	2	3	4	Total
#22 (FCS) Wildcats	0	0	0	0	0
Aztecs	14	7	3	7	31

=== California ===
	1	2	3	4	Total
Golden Bears	14	7	10	9	40
Aztecs	14	17	7	7	45

=== At Northern Illinois ===
	1	2	3	4	Total
Aztecs	14	14	0	14	42
Huskies	0	7	14	7	28

=== At South Alabama ===
	1	2	3	4	Total
#19 Aztecs	6	10	8	0	24
Jaguars	14	0	7	21	42

=== UNLV ===
	1	2	3	4	Total
Rebels	0	7	0	0	7
Aztecs	10	3	7	6	26

=== At Fresno State ===
	1	2	3	4	Total
Aztecs	3	7	7	0	17
Bulldogs	0	0	3	0	3

=== San Jose State ===
	1	2	3	4	Total
Spartans	0	3	0	0	3
Aztecs	7	14	21	0	42

=== At Utah State ===
	1	2	3	4	Total
Aztecs	10	10	3	17	40
Aggies	7	0	0	6	13

=== Hawaii ===
	1	2	3	4	Total
Rainbow Warriors	0	0	0	0	0
Aztecs	14	13	14	14	55

=== At Nevada ===
	1	2	3	4	Total
Aztecs	10	16	13	7	46
Wolf Pack	7	0	2	7	16

=== At Wyoming ===
	1	2	3	4	Total
#24 Aztecs	7	10	7	9	33
Cowboys	3	7	10	14	34

=== Colorado State ===
	1	2	3	4	Total
Rams	21	21	14	7	63
Aztecs	7	17	0	7	31

=== At Wyoming–Mountain West Championship Game ===
	1	2	3	4	Total
Aztecs	7	3	14	3	27
Cowboys	10	0	0	14	24

=== Houston–Las Vegas Bowl ===
	1	2	3	4	Total
Cougars	10	0	0	0	10
Aztecs	0	6	14	14	34

== Rankings ==
Ranking movements Legend: ██ Increase in ranking ██ Decrease in ranking — = Not ranked RV = Received votes
	Week															
Poll	Pre	1	2	3	4	5	6	7	8	9	10	11	12	13	14	Final
AP	RV	RV	RV	22	19	RV	RV	RV	RV	RV	RV	24	—	—	RV	25
Coaches	RV	RV	RV	RV	24	RV	RV	RV	RV	RV	RV	25	RV	RV	RV	25
CFP	Not released									—	—	—	—	—	—	Not released
