= 2016 Colorado State Rams football team =

American college football season

2016 Colorado State Rams football

Famous Idaho Potato Bowl, L 50–61 vs. Idaho
- Conference: Mountain West Conference
- Mountain Division
- Record: 7–6 (5–3 MW)
- Head coach: Mike Bobo (2nd season)
- Offensive coordinator: Will Friend (2nd season)
- Offensive scheme: Pro-style
- Defensive coordinator: Marty English (4th season)
- Base defense: 4–3
- Home stadium: Sonny Lubick Field at Hughes Stadium

Uniform
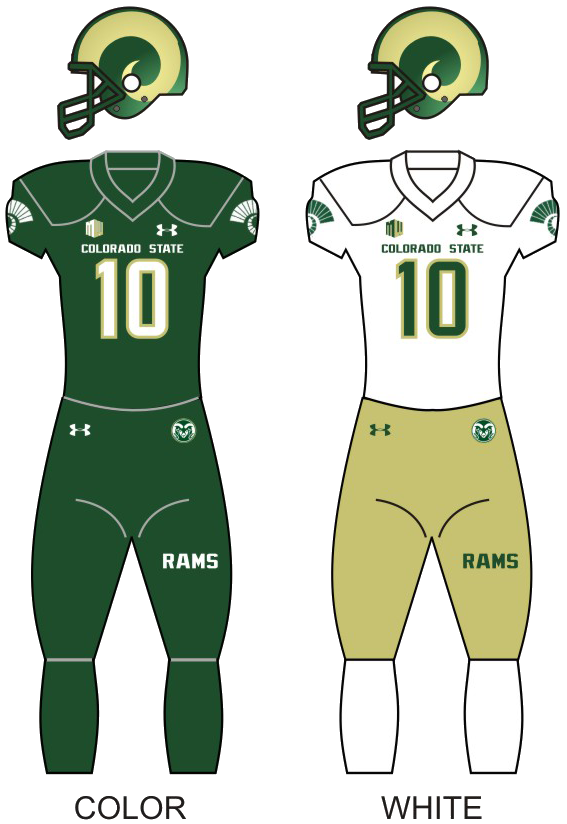

2016 Mountain West Conference football standings
	Conf.			Overall
Team	W		L	W		L
Mountain Division
Wyoming xy	6	–	2	8	–	6
Boise State x	6	–	2	10	–	3
New Mexico x	6	–	2	9	–	4
Air Force	5	–	3	10	–	3
Colorado State	5	–	3	7	–	6
Utah State	1	–	7	3	–	9
West Division
No. 25 San Diego State xy$	6	–	2	11	–	3
Hawaii	4	–	4	7	–	7
Nevada	3	–	5	5	–	7
San Jose State	3	–	5	4	–	8
UNLV	3	–	5	4	–	8
Fresno State	0	–	8	1	–	11
Championship: San Diego State 27, Wyoming 24
$ – Conference champion; x – Division champion/co-champions; y – Championship game participant; Rankings from AP Poll

The 2016 Colorado State Rams football team represented Colorado State University during the 2016 NCAA Division I FBS football season. The Rams were led by second-year head coach Mike Bobo and played their home games at Sonny Lubick Field at Hughes Stadium. It was their last season before moving to a new stadium in 2017. They were a member of the Mountain Division of the Mountain West Conference. They finished the season 7–6, 5–3 in Mountain West play to finish in a tie for fourth place in the Mountain Division. They were invited to the Famous Idaho Potato Bowl where they lost to Idaho.

== Schedule ==
Date	Time	Opponent	Site	TV	Result	Attendance
September 2	6:00 p.m.	vs. Colorado*	Sports Authority Field at Mile High; Denver, CO (Rocky Mountain Showdown)	ESPN	L 7–44	69,850
September 10	2:00 p.m.	UTSA*	Hughes Stadium; Fort Collins, CO	MW Net/Twitter	W 23–14	20,673
September 17	2:00 p.m.	Northern Colorado*	Hughes Stadium; Fort Collins, CO	RTRM	W 47–21	26,718
September 24	10:00 a.m.	at Minnesota*	TCF Bank Stadium; Minneapolis, MN	ESPNU	L 24–31	44,854
October 1	8:15 p.m.	Wyoming	Hughes Stadium; Fort Collins, CO (Bronze Boot)	ESPNU	L 17–38	33,500
October 8	8:00 p.m.	Utah State^{†}	Hughes Stadium; Fort Collins, CO	CBSSN	W 31–24	32,387
October 15	8:15 p.m.	at No. 15 Boise State	Albertsons Stadium; Boise, ID	ESPN2	L 23–28	33,448
October 22	3:30 p.m.	at UNLV	Sam Boyd Stadium; Whitney, NV	RTRM	W 42–23	18,362
November 5	1:30 p.m.	Fresno State	Hughes Stadium; Fort Collins, CO	RTRM	W 37–0	23,187
November 12	8:15 p.m.	at Air Force	Falcon Stadium; Colorado Springs, CO (Battle for the Ram–Falcon Trophy)	ESPNU	L 46–49	23,467
November 19	8:15 p.m.	New Mexico	Hughes Stadium; Fort Collins, CO	ESPN2	W 49–31	29,133
November 26	7:00 p.m.	at San Diego State	Qualcomm Stadium; San Diego, CA	CBSSN	W 63–31	34,223
December 22	5:00 p.m.	vs. Idaho*	Albertsons Stadium; Boise, ID (Famous Idaho Potato Bowl)	ESPN	L 50–61	24,975
*Non-conference game; ^{†}Homecoming; Rankings from AP Poll released prior to game; All times are in Mountain time

Schedule source:

== Roster ==
2016 Colorado State Rams football team roster
Players
Coaches
Offense

Pos.	#	Name	Class
RB	1	Dalyn Dawkins	Jr
WR	4	Michael Gallup	Jr
QB	5	Faton Bauta	Sr
FB	5	Jared Bohm	Fr
RB	6	Darius May	Fr
QB	7	Nick Stevens	Jr

Defense

Pos.	#	Name	Class
DB	2	Robert Awunganyi	Fr
DB	3	A'Keitheon Whitner	Jr
DL	4	Christian Colon	Fr
DB	5	Tyree Simmons	Sr

Special teams

Pos.	#	Name	Class

Head coach

- Mike Bobo

Coordinators/assistant coaches

Legend

- (C) Team captain
- (S) Suspended
- (I) Ineligible
- Injured
- Redshirt

Roster

== Game summaries ==
=== Vs. Colorado ===
	1	2	3	4	Total
Rams	0	0	0	7	7
Buffaloes	21	10	6	7	44

=== UTSA ===
	1	2	3	4	Total
Roadrunners	7	7	0	0	14
Rams	10	10	0	3	23

=== Northern Colorado ===
	1	2	3	4	Total
Bears	0	0	14	7	21
Rams	21	17	3	6	47

=== At Minnesota ===
	1	2	3	4	Total
Rams	7	0	10	7	24
Golden Gophers	7	10	7	7	31

=== Wyoming ===
	1	2	3	4	Total
Cowboys	3	21	14	0	38
Rams	7	10	0	0	17

=== Utah State ===
	1	2	3	4	Total
Aggies	14	10	0	0	24
Rams	10	0	14	7	31

=== At Boise State ===
	1	2	3	4	Total
Rams	3	0	0	20	23
No. 15 Broncos	0	7	14	7	28

=== At UNLV ===
	1	2	3	4	Total
Rams	14	21	0	7	42
Rebels	0	0	10	13	23

=== Fresno State ===
	1	2	3	4	Total
Bulldogs	0	0	0	0	0
Rams	10	13	14	0	37

=== At Air Force ===
	1	2	3	4	Total
Rams	14	10	14	8	46
Falcons	7	21	14	7	49

=== New Mexico ===
	1	2	3	4	Total
Lobos	7	3	7	14	31
Rams	14	14	21	0	49

- This was the Rams' final home game at Hughes Stadium.

=== At San Diego State ===
	1	2	3	4	Total
Rams	21	21	14	7	63
Aztecs	7	17	0	7	31

=== Vs. Idaho–Famous Idaho Potato Bowl ===
	1	2	3	4	Total
Vandals	0	20	21	20	61
Rams	0	7	7	36	50
