= 2016 Arizona Bowl =

American college football game

2016 Nova Home Loans Arizona Bowl
South Alabama Jaguars	Air Force Falcons
(6–6)	(9–3)
Sun Belt	Mountain West
21	45
Head coach: Joey Jones	Head coach: Troy Calhoun
	1	2	3	4	Total
South Alabama	14	7	0	0	21
Air Force	3	18	17	7	45
- Date: December 30, 2016
- Season: 2016
- Stadium: Arizona Stadium
- Location: Tucson, Arizona
- MVP: Arion Worthman (QB, Air Force) & Weston Steelhammer (DB, Air Force)
- Favorite: Air Force by 13
- Referee: Jerry Magallanes (ACC)
- Attendance: 33,868

United States TV coverage
- Network: ASN/Campus Insiders
- Announcers: Mike Gleason, Doug Chapman, Monica McNutt (ASN); Ari Wolfe, Darius Walker, Eddie Yarbrough, Shae Peppler (Campus Insiders)

The 2016 Arizona Bowl (known as the 2016 NOVA Home Loans Arizona Bowl for sponsorship reasons) was a postseason college football bowl game played between the South Alabama Jaguars and the Air Force Falcons played on December 30, 2016, at Arizona Stadium in Tucson, Arizona. It was the second edition of the Arizona Bowl and the final game of the 2016 NCAA Division I FBS football season for both teams.

== Game summary ==
=== Scoring summary ===
Scoring summary

Quarter	Time	Drive			Team	Scoring information	Score	
Quarter	Time	Plays	Yards	TOP	Team	Scoring information	USA	AFA
1	14:49	1	75	0:11	USA	Josh Magee 75-yard touchdown reception from Dallas Davis, Gavin Patterson kick good	7	0
1	9:05	11	55	5:37	AFA	25-yard field goal by Luke Strebel	7	3
1	6:08	7	75	2:57	USA	Dami Ayoola 2-yard touchdown run, Gavin Patterson kick good	14	3
2	10:41	5	59	1:59	USA	Dallas Davis 4-yard touchdown run, Gavin Patterson kick good	21	3
2	6:34	7	69	4:01	AFA	22-yard field goal by Luke Strebel	21	6
2	1:49	4	35	1:43	AFA	Ronald Cleveland 14-yard touchdown run, Luke Strebel kick good	21	13
2	0:25	2	1	0:35	AFA	Jacobi Owens 1-yard touchdown run, 2-point pass (Worthman–Robinette) good	21	21
3	14:42	1	75	0:18	AFA	Jale Robinette 75-yard touchdown reception from Arion Worthman, Luke Strebel kick good	21	28
3	6:35	12	75	5:46	AFA	Tyler Williams 6-yard touchdown run, Luke Strebel kick good	21	35
3	2:03	6	40	2:59	AFA	37-yard field goal by Luke Strebel	21	38
4	9:12	11	69	7:03	AFA	Jacobi Owens 22-yard touchdown run, Luke Strebel kick good	21	45
"TOP" = time of possession. For other American football terms, see Glossary of American football.							21	45

=== Statistics ===
Statistics	USA	AFA
First downs	13	24
Plays–yards	47–313	24–460
Third down efficiency	3–8	5–13
Rushes–yards	21–68	63–253
Passing yards	245	207
Passing, Comp–Att–Int	10–26–1	7–10–0
Time of Possession	19:34	40:26

Team	Category	Player	Statistics
USA	Passing	Dallas Davis	10/24, 245 yds, 1 TD, 1 INT
USA	Rushing	Xavier Johnson	4 car, 44 yds
USA	Receiving	Josh Magee	5 rec, 154 yds, 1 TD
AFA	Passing	Arion Worthman	7/10, 207 yds, 1 TD
AFA	Rushing	Jacobi Owens	17 car, 74 yds, 2 TD
AFA	Receiving	Tyler Williams	3 rec, 66 yds
