= 2016 New Mexico Lobos football team =

American college football season

2016 New Mexico Lobos football

MW Mountain Division co-champion New Mexico Bowl champion

New Mexico Bowl, W 23–20 vs. UTSA
- Conference: Mountain West Conference
- Mountain Division
- Record: 9–4 (6–2 MW)
- Head coach: Bob Davie (5th season)
- Offensive coordinator: Bob DeBesse (5th season)
- Offensive scheme: Multiple pistol
- Defensive coordinator: Kevin Cosgrove (3rd season)
- Base defense: 3–4
- Home stadium: University Stadium

2016 Mountain West Conference football standings
	Conf.			Overall
Team	W		L	W		L
Mountain Division
Wyoming xy	6	–	2	8	–	6
Boise State x	6	–	2	10	–	3
New Mexico x	6	–	2	9	–	4
Air Force	5	–	3	10	–	3
Colorado State	5	–	3	7	–	6
Utah State	1	–	7	3	–	9
West Division
No. 25 San Diego State xy$	6	–	2	11	–	3
Hawaii	4	–	4	7	–	7
Nevada	3	–	5	5	–	7
San Jose State	3	–	5	4	–	8
UNLV	3	–	5	4	–	8
Fresno State	0	–	8	1	–	11
Championship: San Diego State 27, Wyoming 24
$ – Conference champion; x – Division champion/co-champions; y – Championship game participant; Rankings from AP Poll

The 2016 New Mexico Lobos football team represented the University of New Mexico as a member of the Mountain Division in the Mountain West Conference (MW) during the 2016 NCAA Division I FBS football season. Led by fifth-year head coach Bob Davie, the Lobos compiled an overall record of 9–4 with a mark of 6–2 in conference play, sharing the MW's Mountain Division with Boise State and Wyoming. Based on tiebreakers, Wyoming advanced to the Mountain West Championship Game. The team played home games at University Stadium in Albuquerque, New Mexico.

New Mexico was invited to the New Mexico Bowl, where the Lobos defeated UTSA. This was the last season the Lobos would be bowl eligible until 2025.

== Schedule ==
Date	Time	Opponent	Site	TV	Result	Attendance
September 1	7:00 p.m.	South Dakota*	University Stadium; Albuquerque, NM	RTSW, RTRM	W 48–21	20,221
September 10	6:00 p.m.	at New Mexico State*	Aggie Memorial Stadium; Las Cruces, NM (Rio Grande Rivalry)	ESPN3	L 31–32	17,852
September 17	10:00 a.m.	at Rutgers*	High Point Solutions Stadium; Pisacataway, NJ	ESPNews	L 28–37	39,680
October 1	2:00 p.m.	San Jose State^{†}	University Stadium; Albuquerque, NM	RTRM	W 48–41	19,852
October 7	7:00 p.m.	No. 19 Boise State	University Stadium; Albuquerque, NM	CBSSN	L 21–49	20,090
October 15	1:30 p.m.	vs. Air Force	Cotton Bowl; Dallas, TX	ESPNews	W 45–40	18,756
October 22	7:00 p.m.	Louisiana–Monroe*	University Stadium; Albuquerque, NM	RTRM, RTSW	W 59–17	18,099
October 29	9:00 p.m.	at Hawaii	Aloha Stadium; Halawa, HI	MW Net	W 28–21	23,965
November 5	8:15 p.m.	Nevada	University Stadium; Albuquerque, NM	ESPNU	W 35–26	17,290
November 12	8:15 p.m.	at Utah State	Maverik Stadium; Logan, UT	ESPN2	W 24–21	15,212
November 19	8:15 p.m.	at Colorado State	Hughes Stadium; Fort Collins, CO	ESPN2	L 31–49	29,133
November 26	8:15 p.m.	Wyoming	University Stadium; Albuquerque, NM	ESPN2	W 56–35	16,698
December 17	12:00 p.m.	UTSA*	University Stadium; Albuquerque, NM (New Mexico Bowl)	ESPN	W 23–20	29,688
*Non-conference game; ^{†}Homecoming; Rankings from AP Poll released prior to the game; All times are in Mountain time

== Game summaries ==
=== South Dakota ===
	1	2	3	4	Total
Coyotes	14	0	7	0	21
Lobos	14	21	6	7	48

=== At New Mexico State ===
	1	2	3	4	Total
Lobos	14	3	7	7	31
Aggies	3	12	7	10	32

=== At Rutgers ===
	1	2	3	4	Total
Lobos	21	0	0	7	28
Scarlet Knights	7	21	3	6	37

=== San Jose State ===
	1	2	3	4	Total
Spartans	13	7	0	21	41
Lobos	14	17	10	7	48

=== Boise State ===
	1	2	3	4	Total
#19 Broncos	14	28	7	0	49
Lobos	7	0	0	14	21

=== Vs. Air Force ===
	1	2	3	4	Total
Lobos	14	21	10	0	45
Falcons	10	17	7	6	40

=== Louisiana–Monroe ===
	1	2	3	4	Total
Warhawks	0	3	0	14	17
Lobos	28	7	17	7	59

=== At Hawaii ===
	1	2	3	4	Total
Lobos	14	0	7	7	28
Rainbow Warriors	0	14	0	7	21

=== Nevada ===
	1	2	3	4	Total
Wolf Pack	0	14	0	12	26
Lobos	7	7	14	7	35

=== At Utah State ===
	1	2	3	4	Total
Lobos	0	6	15	3	24
Aggies	14	0	7	0	21

=== At Colorado State ===
	1	2	3	4	Total
Lobos	7	3	7	14	31
Rams	14	14	21	0	49

=== Wyoming ===
	1	2	3	4	Total
Cowboys	0	7	14	14	35
Lobos	21	14	7	14	56

=== UTSA–New Mexico Bowl ===
	1	2	3	4	Total
Roadrunners	3	3	0	14	20
Lobos	7	3	6	7	23

== Roster ==
2016 New Mexico Lobos football team roster
Players
Coaches
Offense

Pos.	#	Name	Class
QB	13	Lamar Jordan	Jr

Defense

Pos.	#	Name	Class
LB	49	Dakota Cox	Sr
LB	89	Dyson Chmura	Fr

Special teams

Pos.	#	Name	Class
K	95	Jason Sanders	Jr

Head coach

- Bob Davie

Coordinators/assistant coaches

- Kevin Cosgrove – Defensive coordinator / Linebackers

Legend

- (C) Team captain
- (S) Suspended
- (I) Ineligible
- Injured
- Redshirt

Roster
