= Zach Kline =

American gridiron football player (born 1993)

Profile
- Position: Quarterback

Personal information
- Born: October 13, 1993 (age 33); Danville, California, U.S.
- Listed height: 6 ft 2 in (1.88 m)
- Listed weight: 220 lb (100 kg)

Career information
- College: California (2012–2013, 2016); Butte College (2014); Indiana State (2015); Fresno State (2016)

Career history
- 2017–2018: Edmonton Eskimos

Zach Kline (born October 13, 1993) is an American former football quarterback. He played at the University of California, Berkeley, Butte College, Indiana State University, returned to the University of California, Berkeley, and as a graduate transfer at Fresno State.

== Playing career ==
=== Amateur ===
Kline was nationally ranked as the number 2 pro-style quarterback in the 2012 high school class. Kline committed to play for Jeff Tedford at the University of California, Berkeley, where he enrolled early at the start of 2012. Kline redshirted during the 2012 season, after which Jeff Tedford was fired. Kline lost the ensuing quarterback competition to Jared Goff under new Cal head coach Sonny Dykes. After Cal went 1–11 during the 2013 season, Kline elected to transfer.

Despite brief news of Kline transferring to Oregon State, an internal Pac-12 transfer blocked by Sonny Dykes, Kline enrolled in Oroville's Butte College for the 2014 season.

After the 2014 season at Butte College, Kline transferred to Div 1 FCS Indiana State University, where he was backup quarterback for the 2015 season; he appeared in 3 games. Following the 2015 season, Kline returned to the University of California, Berkeley in pursuit of his degree. Following the departure of offensive coordinator Tony Franklin, Kline rejoined the Cal Football Team for 2016 spring practices.

During the 2016 Cal Spring Game, Kline was 15–16 for 202 yards with 2 touchdowns. However, Cal took graduate transfer Davis Webb as their starter for the 2016 season. Kline graduated with a degree in English in summer 2016, and transferred to Fresno State University where he played for head coach Tim DeRuyter before DeRuyter’s firing.

=== Professional career ===
On June 5, 2017, Kline signed with the Edmonton Eskimos of the Canadian Football League. He became a free agent on November 4, 2018, without having appeared in a game during his two seasons with the team.

== Post-playing career ==
As of July 2021, Kline was a singer-songwriter in Nashville, Tennessee.
