= Kurt Palandech =

American football player (born 1994)

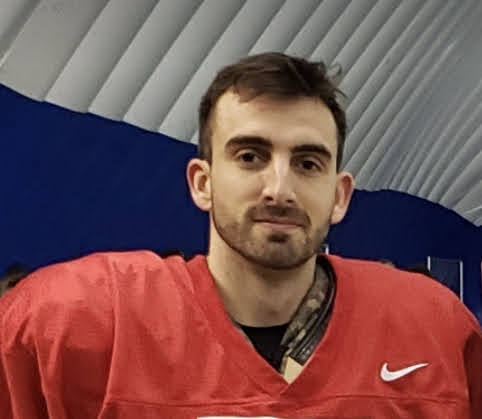

No. 6 – Nojima Sagamihara Rise
- Position: Quarterback

Personal information
- Born: November 11, 1994 (age 32); Plainfield, Illinois, U.S.
- Listed height: 6 ft 2 in (1.88 m)
- Listed weight: 196 lb (89 kg)

Career information
- High school: Plainfield North
- College: Laney; UNLV
- NFL draft: 2018: undrafted

Career history
- Cedar Rapids River Kings (2019); Berlin Rebels (2019); Nojima Sagamihara Rise (2020–present)

Awards and highlights
- X-League Rookie of the Year (2020); All X-League (2025)

Kurt Palandech (born November 11, 1994) is an American football quarterback for the Nojima Sagamihara Rise in the Japanese X-League. He also played for the Berlin Rebels in the German Football League (GFL).

== Early life ==
Palandech attended Plainfield North High School and was a three-sport athlete. He was selected to the All-Area Team for football and baseball.

== College career ==
Palandech spent his freshmen year redshirting at the University of North Dakota. After completing his redshirt year, he transferred to Laney College, in Oakland, California. In his only season with the Laney Eagles, Palandech threw for 1,634 passing yards and 17 touchdowns while also rushing for 390 yards and five touchdowns.

From 2015 to 2017, Palandech played for the UNLV Rebels, throwing 1,489 passing yards and 14 touchdowns and rushing 728 yards with 9 touchdowns, averaging 5.0 yards per carry. In his first start as a junior, Palandech threw for 252 yards, 3 touchdowns, no interceptions and also rushed for 157 yards, with a 76-yard touchdown. This performance in a 69-66 triple overtime win against Wyoming earned him Mountain West Offensive Player of the Week. In 2017, Palandech was selected as a semifinalist for the William V. Campbell Trophy, which recognizes the best football scholar-athlete in the nation, considered by many and nicknamed the "Academic Heisman". Palandech was a three-time Academic All-Mountain West honoree, three-time recipient of the Mountain West Scholar-Athlete Award, and was named to the National Football Foundation & College Hall of Fame 2018 NFF Hampshire Honor Society.

In 2019, Palandech was named to the UNLV Rebels All-Decade Team.

== Professional career ==
=== Cedar Rapids River Kings ===
Palandech began his professional football career in 2019 playing for the Cedar Rapids River Kings of the Indoor Football League (IFL). In Cedar Rapids, he was reunited with former UNLV teammate, Kyle Saxelid. In the River King's first win that year, Palandech threw for 143 yards and five touchdowns without a turnover.

=== Berlin Rebels ===
In 2019, Palandech signed with the Berlin Rebels. After missing three games, he threw for 2,306 yards and 24 touchdowns while leading the Rebels to a playoff appearance.

=== Nojima Sagamihara Rise ===
In 2020, Palandech signed with the Nojima Sagamihara Rise and won the X-League Rookie of the Year Award. In 2025, he was selected as the All X-League quarterback.
