= 2017 Wyoming Cowboys football team =

American college football season

2017 Wyoming Cowboys football

Famous Idaho Potato Bowl champion

Famous Idaho Potato Bowl, W 37–14 vs. Central Michigan
- Conference: Mountain West Conference
- Mountain Division
- Record: 8–5 (5–3 MW)
- Head coach: Craig Bohl (4th season)
- Offensive coordinator: Brent Vigen (4th season)
- Offensive scheme: Pro-style
- Defensive coordinator: Scottie Hazelton (1st season)
- Base defense: 4–3
- Home stadium: War Memorial Stadium

2017 Mountain West Conference football standings
	Conf.			Overall
Team	W		L	W		L
Mountain Division
No. 22 Boise State xy$	7	–	1	11	–	3
Colorado State	5	–	3	7	–	6
Wyoming	5	–	3	8	–	5
Utah State	4	–	4	6	–	7
Air Force	4	–	4	5	–	7
New Mexico	1	–	7	3	–	9
West Division
Fresno State xy	7	–	1	10	–	4
San Diego State	6	–	2	10	–	3
UNLV	4	–	4	5	–	7
Nevada	3	–	5	3	–	9
Hawaii	1	–	7	3	–	9
San Jose State	1	–	7	2	–	11
Championship: Boise State 17, Fresno State 14
$ – Conference champion; x – Division champion/co-champions; y – Championship game participant; Rankings from AP Poll

The 2017 Wyoming Cowboys football team represented the University of Wyoming as a member Mountain West Conference (MW) during the 2017 NCAA Division I FBS football season. Led by fourth-year head coach Craig Bohl, the Cowboys compiled an overall record of 8–5 record with mark 5–3 in conference play, tying for second place in the MW's Mountain Division. Wyoming was invited to the Famous Idaho Potato Bowl, where the Cowboys defeated Central Michigan. The team played home games at War Memorial Stadium in Laramie, Wyoming.

Scottie Hazelton was hired as Wyoming's new defensive coordinator. He was previously a linebackers coach in the National Football League (NFL) with Jacksonville Jaguars for three seasons, and was Bohl's defensive coordinator for two seasons at North Dakota State.

== Schedule ==
Date	Time	Opponent	Site	TV	Result	Attendance
September 2	10:00 a.m.	at Iowa*	Kinnick Stadium; Iowa City, IA	BTN	L 3–24	68,075
September 9	2:00 p.m.	Gardner–Webb*	War Memorial Stadium; Laramie, WY	ATTSNRM	W 27–0	19,051
September 16	5:00 p.m.	Oregon*	War Memorial Stadium; Laramie, WY	CBSSN	L 13–49	29,139
September 23	8:15 p.m.	Hawaii	War Memorial Stadium; Laramie, WY (rivalry)	ESPN2	W 28–21 ^{OT}	17,796
September 30	2:00 p.m.	Texas State*	War Memorial Stadium; Laramie, WY	Stadium	W 45–10	21,784
October 14	2:30 p.m.	at Utah State	Maverik Stadium; Logan, UT (rivalry)	Stadium	W 28–23	22,234
October 21	8:15 p.m.	at Boise State	Albertsons Stadium; Boise, ID	ESPN2	L 14–24	35,565
October 28	5:30 p.m.	New Mexico^{†}	War Memorial Stadium; Laramie, WY	ESPNU	W 42–3	18,249
November 4	5:00 p.m.	Colorado State	War Memorial Stadium; Laramie, WY (Border War)	CBSSN	W 16–13	22,840
November 11	8:15 p.m.	at Air Force	Falcon Stadium; Colorado Springs, CO	ESPNU	W 28–14	24,257
November 18	12:00 p.m.	Fresno State	War Memorial Stadium; Laramie, WY	ATTSNRM	L 7–13	15,440
November 25	5:00 p.m.	at San Jose State	CEFCU Stadium; San Jose, CA	ESPN3	L 17–20	12,653
December 22	2:00 p.m.	vs. Central Michigan*	Albertsons Stadium; Boise, ID (Famous Idaho Potato Bowl)	ESPN	W 37–14	16,512
*Non-conference game; ^{†}Homecoming; All times are in Mountain time

== Game summaries ==
=== At Iowa ===
	1	2	3	4	Total
Cowboys	0	3	0	0	3
Hawkeyes	0	14	7	3	24

Team	Category	Player	Statistics
Wyoming	Passing	Josh Allen	23/40, 174 yards, 2 INT
Wyoming	Rushing	Milo Hall	9 carries, 30 yards
Wyoming	Receiving	Austin Conway	7 receptions, 47 yards
Iowa	Passing	Nate Stanley	8/15, 125 yards, 3 TD, 1 INT
Iowa	Rushing	Akrum Wadley	24 carries, 116 yards
Iowa	Receiving	Nick Easley	4 receptions, 77 yards, 1 TD

=== Gardner–Webb ===
	1	2	3	4	Total
Runnin' Bulldogs	0	0	0	0	0
Cowboys	14	10	0	3	27

Team	Category	Player	Statistics
Gardner–Webb	Passing	Tyrell Maxwell	2/7, 22 yards, 1 INT
Gardner–Webb	Rushing	Tyrell Maxwell	18 carries, 68 yards
Gardner–Webb	Receiving	James Ellis II	1 reception, 12 yards
Wyoming	Passing	Josh Allen	22/32, 328 yards, 2 TD
Wyoming	Rushing	Kellen Overstreet	14 carries, 33 yards
Wyoming	Receiving	Austin Conway	11 receptions, 135 yards, 1 TD

=== Oregon ===
	1	2	3	4	Total
Ducks	14	28	0	7	49
Cowboys	10	0	3	0	13

Team	Category	Player	Statistics
Oregon	Passing	Justin Herbert	18/29, 251 yards, 1 TD, 1 INT
Oregon	Rushing	Royce Freeman	30 carries, 157 yards, 3 TD
Oregon	Receiving	Dillon Mitchell	6 receptions, 65 yards
Wyoming	Passing	Josh Allen	9/24, 64 yards, 1 INT
Wyoming	Rushing	Milo Hall	11 carries, 43 yards
Wyoming	Receiving	Austin Conway	4 receptions, 27 yards

=== Hawaii ===
	1	2	3	4	OT	Total
Rainbow Warriors	0	7	7	7	0	21
Cowboys	0	7	7	7	7	28

Team	Category	Player	Statistics
Hawaii	Passing	Dru Brown	29/40, 280 yards, 1 TD, 2 INT
Hawaii	Rushing	Diocemy Saint Juste	26 carries, 120 yards, 1 TD
Hawaii	Receiving	John Ursua	8 receptions, 102 yards, 1 TD
Wyoming	Passing	Josh Allen	9/19, 92 yards, 1 TD
Wyoming	Rushing	Trey Woods	15 carries, 135 yards, 1 TD
Wyoming	Receiving	Tyree Mayfield	2 receptions, 27 yards

=== Texas State ===
	1	2	3	4	Total
Bobcats	0	10	0	0	10
Cowboys	0	31	14	0	45

- Passing leaders: Josh Allen (UW): 14–24, 219 YDS, 3 TDS; Damian Williams (TSU): 10–19, 91 YDS, 1 TD, 1 INT
- Rushing leaders: Trey Woods (UW): 21 CAR, 53 YDS; Willie Jones III (TSU): 5 CAR, 57 YDS
- Receiving leaders: D.J. Johnson (UW): 4 REC, 57 YDS, 2 TDS; Hutch White (TSU): 2 REC, 42 YDS

=== At Utah State ===
	1	2	3	4	Total
Cowboys	3	6	7	12	28
Aggies	6	10	0	7	23

- Passing leaders: Josh Allen (UW): 18–26, 208 YDS, 1 TD, 1 INT; Jordan Love (USU): 8–18, 109 YDS, 3 INT
- Rushing leaders: Trey Woods (UW): 15 CAR, 40 YDS; LaJuan Hunt (USU): 18 CAR, 73 YDS
- Receiving leaders: James Price (UW): 4 REC, 72 YDS; Dax Raymond (USU): 5 REC, 72 YDS

=== At Boise State ===
	1	2	3	4	Total
Cowboys	7	0	7	0	14
Broncos	0	3	7	14	24

- Passing leaders: Josh Allen (UW): 12–27, 131 YDS, 1 TD, 2 INT; Brett Rypien (BSU): 12–17, 104 YDS
- Rushing leaders: Josh Allen (UW): 18 CAR, 62 YDS 1 TD; Alexander Mattison (BSU): 17 CAR, 91 YDS
- Receiving leaders: Austin Conway (UW): 5 REC, 33 YDS; Cedrick Wilson Jr. (BSU): 5 REC, 66 YDS, 1 TD

=== New Mexico ===
	1	2	3	4	Total
Lobos	0	0	0	3	3
Cowboys	7	35	0	0	42

- Passing leaders: Josh Allen (UW): 16–28, 234 YDS, 4 TD; Tevaka Tuioti (UNM): 8–17, 47 YDS, 3 INT
- Rushing leaders: Trey Woods (UW): 11 CAR, 25 YDS; Richard McQuarley (UNM): 13 CAR, 43 YDS
- Receiving leaders: James Price (UW): 4 REC, 68 YDS; Delane Hart–Johnson (UNM): 1 REC, 17 YDS

=== Colorado State ===
	1	2	3	4	Total
Rams	3	7	0	3	13
Cowboys	0	6	3	7	16

- Passing leaders: Josh Allen (UW): 10–20, 138 YDS; Nick Stevens (CSU): 8–14, 110 YDS
- Rushing leaders: Josh Allen (UW): 12 CAR, 60 YDS; Dalyn Dawkins (CSU): 29 CAR, 154 YDS
- Receiving leaders: Austin Conway & C.J. Johnson (UW): 2 REC, 35 YDS; Dalton Fackrell (CSU): 2 REC, 61 YDS

=== At Air Force ===
	1	2	3	4	Total
Cowboys	7	14	0	7	28
Falcons	0	7	7	0	14

- Passing leaders: Josh Allen (UW): 8–11, 70 YDS, 1 TD; Arion Worthman (AFA): 10–22, 175 YDS, 1 TD, 1 INT
- Rushing leaders: Trey Woods (UW): 11 CAR, 47 YDS, 1 TD; Taven Birdow (AFA): 19 CAR, 82 YDS, 1 TD
- Receiving leaders: Trey Woods (UW): 1 REC, 38 YDS; Marcus Bennet (AFA): 3 REC, 52 YDS, 1 TD

=== Fresno State ===
	1	2	3	4	Total
Bulldogs	3	7	3	0	13
Cowboys	0	0	0	7	7

- Passing leaders: Nick Smith (UW): 20–32, 231 YDS, 1 TD; Marcus McMaryion (FSU): 14–23, 186 YDS, 1 TD
- Rushing leaders: Kellen Overstreet (UW): 10 CAR, 31 YDS; Josh Hokit (FSU): 21 CAR, 69 YDS
- Receiving leaders: Austin Conway (UW): 7 REC, 105 YDS; KeeSean Johnson (FSU): 6 REC, 48 YDS

=== At San Jose State ===
	1	2	3	4	Total
Cowboys	0	7	3	7	17
Spartans	7	6	0	7	20

- Passing leaders: Nick Smith (UW): 17–37, 171 YDS, 1 TD, 2 INT; Montel Aaron (SJSU): 15–29, 174 YDS, 1 INT
- Rushing leaders: Kellen Overstreet (UW): 17 CAR, 139 YDS; DeJon Packer (SJSU): 8 CAR, 75 YDS, 1 TD
- Receiving leaders: C.J. Johnson (UW): 4 REC, 106 YDS, 1 TD; Tre Hartley (SJSU): 7 REC, 109 YDS

=== Vs. Central Michigan—Famous Idaho Potato Bowl ===
	1	2	3	4	Total
Chippewas	7	0	7	0	14
Cowboys	21	6	3	7	37

- Passing leaders: Josh Allen (UW): 11–19, 154 YDS, 3 TD; Shane Morris (CMU): 23–39, 329 YDS, 1 TD, 4 INT
- Rushing leaders: Kellen Overstreet (UW): 21 CAR, 85 YDS; Jonathan Ward (CMU): 12 CAR, 29 YDS, 1 TD
- Receiving leaders: C.J. Johnson (UW): 3 REC, 63 YDS, 1 TD; Jonathan Ward (CMU): 7 REC, 109 YDS, 1 TD

== Personnel ==
=== Coaching staff ===
Name	Position	Seasons at Wyoming	Alma mater	Before Wyoming
Craig Bohl	Head coach	4	Nebraska (1982)	North Dakota State – head coach (2013)
Brent Vigen	Associate head coach / offensive coordinator / quarterbacks	4	North Dakota State (1998)	North Dakota State – Offensive coordinator / quarterbacks (2013)
Scottie Hazelton	Defensive coordinator / Linebackers	1	Fort Lewis (1997)	Jacksonville Jaguars – Assistant linebackers (2016)
Mike Bath	Running Backs / Fullbacks	4	Miami, Ohio (2001)	Miami, Ohio – Interim Head Coach / offensive coordinator (2013)
AJ Cooper	Special teams coordinator / Defensive Ends	4	North Dakota State (2006)	North Dakota State – Defensive ends / Co-Special Teams (2013)
Jake Dickert	Safeties	1	Wisconsin–Stevens Point (2007)	South Dakota State – Co-Special Teams / Safeties (2016)
Scott Fuchs	Offensive line	4	North Dakota State (1995)	North Dakota State (2013)
Mike Grant	Wide receivers	2	Nebraska (1993)	North Texas – Wide receivers / receiving coordinator (2014)
Pete Kaligis	Defensive tackles / Nose Tackles	9	Washington (1994)	Montana – Offensive line (2008)
John Richardson	Cornerbacks	4	North Dakota State (2010)	North Dakota State – Cornerbacks (2013)
Gordie Haug	Director of Recruiting	4	Bemidji State (2009)	North Dakota State – Running backs (2013)
Aaron Bohl	Defensive Graduate Assistant	1	Minnesota State Moorhead (2016)	Minnesota State Moorhead – Linebacker
Jacob Claborn	Offensive Graduate Assistant	2	California Lutheran (2009)	Central Washington – Offensive line (2015)
Josh Firm	Offensive Graduate Assistant	3	Missouri S&T (2013)	Bron-Villeurbanne Falcons – Offensive coordinator (2014)
Rob Schlaeger	Defensive Graduate Assistant	1	Southwest Minnesota State (2015)	West Florida – Outside linebackers (2016)

=== Roster ===
2017 Wyoming Cowboys Football
Quarterbacks: 1 Nick Szpor – sophomore (6'3", 205); 15 Nick Smith – (redshirt) junior (6'4", 231); 17 Josh Allen (C) – (redshirt) junior (6'5", 233); 18 Tyler Vander Waal – freshman (6'4", 210); Tailbacks: 3 Milo Hall – (redshirt) sophomore (5'8", 190); 4 Xazavian Valladay – freshman (6'0", 185); 16 Trey Dorfner – freshman (6'0", 175); 22 Nico Evans – (redshirt) junior (5'9", 211); 23 Mike Green II – (redshirt) freshman (5'11", 205); 24 Jerard Swan – (redshirt) freshman (6'0", 182); 28 Garrett Gardner – (redshirt) sophomore (6'0", 205); 29 Kellen Overstreet – (redshirt) sophomore (5'11', 216); Fullbacks: 34 Jeff Burroughs – (redshirt) freshman (6'1", 242); 35 Jaylon Watson – (redshirt) sophomore (6'0", 245); 36 Drew Van Maanen (C) – (redshirt) senior (6'1", 241); 38 Garrett Shipman – freshman (6'2", 232); 47 Matt List – junior (5'11", 240); Wide receivers: 2 Jared Scott – freshman (6'6", 215); 9 Isaac Leppke – (redshirt) freshman (6'4", 187); 12 Dontae Crow – (redshirt) freshman (5'9", 172); 13 John Okwoli – sophomore (6'2", 207); 14 C.J. Johnson – (redshirt) sophomore (6'2", 204); 19 Ayden Eberhardt – (redshirt) freshman (6'2", 190); 21 Erik Spurlin-Renfroe – freshman (6'1", 180); 24 Jerard Swan – (redshirt) freshman (6'0", 182); 25 Austin Conway – (redshirt) sophomore (5'10", 178); 26 Avante' Cox – freshman (5'11", 170); 31 Isaac Jefferson – (redshirt) sophomore (5'8", 152); 39 Justyn Stindt – freshman (6'2", 185); 80 James Price – junior (6'2", 208); 82 Luke Padula – freshman (6'0", 185); 88 EC Ogu – freshman (6'2", 175); 89 Parker Dumas – (redshirt) freshman (6'5", 216); Tight ends: 33 Josh Harshman – junior (6'3", 235); 81 Austin Fort – (redshirt) junior (6'4", 244); 83 Mason Keeler – freshman (6'6", 240); 84 Nate Weinman – freshman (6'7", 235); 85 Tyree Mayfield – (redshirt) junior (6'3", 241); 87 Sam Maughan – (redshirt) freshman (6'3", 220)	Offensive linemen: 55 Gavin Rush – sophomore (6'3", 298); 57 Patrick Arnold – freshman (6'3", 290); 59 Ryan Cummings – senior (6'6", 309); 61 Kaden Jackson – junior (6'2", 294); 62 Rudy Stofer – freshman (6'6", 255); 64 Zach Thatcher – (redshirt) freshman (6'5", 282); 67 Cole Turner – (redshirt) junior (6'4", 293); 68 Dalton Fields – (redshirt) senior (6'3", 288); 69 Eric Abojei – freshman (6'5", 320); 71 Jace Webb – (redshirt) freshman (6'4", 309); 72 Zach Wallace – junior (6'7", 303); 73 Keegan Cryder – freshman (6'4", 240); 74 Brinkley Jolly – (redshirt) junior (6'5", 277); 75 Dustin Weeks – (redshirt) freshman (6'8", 291); 76 Justis Borton – (redshirt) freshman (6'2", 253); 77 Pahl Schwab – (redshirt) sophomore (6'5", 302); 78 Alonzo Velazquez – freshman (6'6", 270); 79 Logan Harris – freshman (6'3", 275); Defensive linemen: 29 Garrett Crall – (redshirt) freshman (6'5", 235); 37 Josh Calvert – (redshirt) freshman (6'0", 214); 42 Kevin Prosser – junior (6'2", 223); 44 Victor Jones – freshman (6'4", 235); 51 Trevor Meader – (redshirt) sophomore (6'4", 239); 53 Josiah Hall – (redshirt) sophomore (6'1", 243); 54 Austin Lopez – (redshirt) sophomore (6'3", 223); 58 Nela Lolohea – senior (6'1", 253); 63 Ravontae Holt – freshman (6'4", 260); 86 Javaree Jackson – freshman (6'5", 250); 87 Conner Cain – (redshirt) junior (6'4", 283); 90 Gavin Dunayski – freshman (6'6", 250); 91 Carl Granderson – junior (6'5", 243); 92 Shiloh Windsor – sophomore (6'3", 234); 93 Youhanna Ghaifan – (redshirt) sophomore (6'4", 290); 94 Hunter Lee – freshman (6'4", 281); 95 Dylan Leston – freshman (6'5", 240); 96 Sidney Malauulu – (redshirt) junior (6'3", 307); 99 Brent Gilliland – (redshirt) sophomore (6'2", 282)	Linebackers: 7 Chavez Pownell Jr. – (redshirt) junior (5'11", 202); 8 Jalen Ortiz – (redshirt) senior (5'10", 196); 30 Logan Wilson (C) – (redshirt) sophomore (6'2", 229); 35 Skyler Miller – (redshirt) freshman (5'11", 204); 41 Davon Wells-Ross – freshman (6'5", 190); 43 Ben Wisdorf – (redshirt) sophomore (6'1", 222); 45 Adam Pilapil – (redshirt) junior (6'1", 213); 46 Cassh Maluia – sophomore (6'0", 230); 48 Trey Woods – freshman (6'3", 210); 49 Trevon Weaver – freshman (6'2", 215); 50 Ryan Gatoloai-Faupula – freshman (6'1", 210); 52 Jahmari Moore – (redshirt) freshman (6'2", 232); 55 Ryan Mazzola – freshman (6'2", 220); Defensive backs: 2 Robert Priester – senior (5'9", 180); 3 Alijah Halliburton – sophomore (6'2", 190); 4 Antonio Hull – junior (5'10", 192); 5 Rico Gafford – senior (5'11", 182); 6 Marcus Epps (C) – (redshirt) junior (6'0", 206); 9 Tyler Hall – sophomore (5'10", 184); 11 DeAndre Watson – (redshirt) sophomore (5'11", 181); 13 Brennan Kutterer – freshman (6'1", 200); 16 Riley Sessions – (redshirt) freshman (5'11", 196); 18 Keyon Blankenbaker – freshman (5'10", 170); 19 Anthony Makransky – (redshirt) junior (5'10", 184); 22 Sidney Washington Jr. – (redshirt) freshman (5'9", 167); 23 Tim Kamana – (redshirt) senior (5'11", 213); 24 Braden Smith – (redshirt) freshman (5'10", 190); 25 Esaias Gandy – freshman (6'1", 183); 27 C.J. Coldon – freshman (6'1", 175); 28 Andrew Wingard – junior (6'0", 209); 40 Taylor Dodd – freshman (6'2", 195); Placekickers: 40 Cooper Rothe – sophomore (5'11", 174); Punter: 15 Tim Zaleski – freshman (6'5", 215); Long snapper: 91 Kolton Donovan – senior (6'3", 250)

=== 2017 recruiting class ===
Wyoming signed 23 high school players and one transfer.

College recruiting information
Name	Hometown	School	Height	Weight	40^{‡}	Commit date
Patrick Arnold; OL	Omaha, NE	Gretna HS	6 ft 3 in (1.91 m)	290 lb (130 kg)	—	Oct 8, 2016
Patrick Arnold; OL	Recruit ratings: Scout: Rivals: 247Sports: ESPN:					
Keyon Blankenbaker; CB	Oak Park, IL	Oak Park–River Forest HS	5 ft 10 in (1.78 m)	170 lb (77 kg)	—	Dec 13, 2016
Keyon Blankenbaker; CB	Recruit ratings: Scout: Rivals: 247Sports: ESPN:					
C.J. Coldon; CB	Belleville, IL	Althoff Catholic HS	6 ft 1 in (1.85 m)	175 lb (79 kg)	—	Dec 11, 2016
C.J. Coldon; CB	Recruit ratings: Scout: Rivals: 247Sports: ESPN:					
Avante' Cox; WR	Rochester, IL	Rochester HS	5 ft 11 in (1.80 m)	170 lb (77 kg)	—	Dec 6, 2016
Avante' Cox; WR	Recruit ratings: Scout: Rivals: 247Sports: ESPN:					
Keegan Cryder; OT	Littleton, CO	Dakota Ridge HS	6 ft 4 in (1.93 m)	240 lb (110 kg)	—	Oct 9, 2016
Keegan Cryder; OT	Recruit ratings: Scout: Rivals: 247Sports: ESPN:					
Trey Dorfner; RB	Fircrest, WA	River Ridge HS	6 ft 0 in (1.83 m)	175 lb (79 kg)	—	Oct 30, 2016
Trey Dorfner; RB	Recruit ratings: Scout: Rivals: 247Sports: ESPN:					
Kolton Donovan; LS	Washington, UT	Southern Utah	6 ft 3 in (1.91 m)	250 lb (110 kg)	—	Feb 1, 2017
Kolton Donovan; LS	Recruit ratings: Scout: Rivals: 247Sports: ESPN:					
Gavin Dunayski; DL	Puyallup, WA	Puyallup HS	6 ft 6 in (1.98 m)	250 lb (110 kg)	—	Jan 19, 2017
Gavin Dunayski; DL	Recruit ratings: Scout: Rivals: 247Sports: ESPN:					
Esaias Gandy; S	Aurora, CO	Denver South HS	6 ft 1 in (1.85 m)	183 lb (83 kg)	—	Oct 3, 2016
Esaias Gandy; S	Recruit ratings: Scout: Rivals: 247Sports: ESPN:					
Ryan Gatoloai–Faupula; LB	Sacramento, CA	Inderkum HS	6 ft 1 in (1.85 m)	210 lb (95 kg)	—	Nov 1, 2016
Ryan Gatoloai–Faupula; LB	Recruit ratings: Scout: Rivals: 247Sports: ESPN:					
Logan Harris; OL	Torrington, WY	Torrington HS	6 ft 3 in (1.91 m)	275 lb (125 kg)	—	Jun 27, 2016
Logan Harris; OL	Recruit ratings: Scout: Rivals: 247Sports: ESPN:					
Ravontae Holt; DL	Sacramento, CA	Sheldon HS	6 ft 4 in (1.93 m)	260 lb (120 kg)	—	Dec 29, 2016
Ravontae Holt; DL	Recruit ratings: Scout: Rivals: 247Sports: ESPN:					
Javaree Jackson; DL	Wauwatosa, WI	Wauwatosa West HS	6 ft 5 in (1.96 m)	250 lb (110 kg)	—	Dec 13, 2016
Javaree Jackson; DL	Recruit ratings: Scout: Rivals: 247Sports: ESPN:					
Victor Jones; DE	Sacramento, CA	Inderkum HS	6 ft 4 in (1.93 m)	235 lb (107 kg)	—	Dec 29, 2016
Victor Jones; DE	Recruit ratings: Scout: Rivals: 247Sports: ESPN:					
Jared Scott; WR	Oak Park, IL	Oak Park–River Forest HS	6 ft 6 in (1.98 m)	215 lb (98 kg)	—	Jan 24, 2017
Jared Scott; WR	Recruit ratings: Scout: Rivals: 247Sports: ESPN:					
Erik Spurlin–Renfroe; WR	Cerritos, CA	Gahr HS	6 ft 1 in (1.85 m)	180 lb (82 kg)	—	Jan 31, 2017
Erik Spurlin–Renfroe; WR	Recruit ratings: Scout: Rivals: 247Sports: ESPN:					
Rudy Stofer; OT	Kearney, NE	Kearney HS	6 ft 6 in (1.98 m)	255 lb (116 kg)	—	Nov 3, 2016
Rudy Stofer; OT	Recruit ratings: Scout: Rivals: 247Sports: ESPN:					
Xazavian Valladay; RB	Matteson, IL	Brother Rice HS	6 ft 0 in (1.83 m)	185 lb (84 kg)	—	Oct 12, 2016
Xazavian Valladay; RB	Recruit ratings: Scout: Rivals: 247Sports: ESPN:					
Tyler Vander Waal; QB	Elk Grove, CA	Christian Brothers HS	6 ft 4 in (1.93 m)	210 lb (95 kg)	—	Dec 14, 2016
Tyler Vander Waal; QB	Recruit ratings: Scout: Rivals: 247Sports: ESPN:					
Alonzo Velazquez; OT	Janesville, WI	Parker HS	6 ft 6 in (1.98 m)	270 lb (120 kg)	—	Nov 2, 2016
Alonzo Velazquez; OT	Recruit ratings: Scout: Rivals: 247Sports: ESPN:					
Nate Weinman; TE	Creston, OH	Norwayne HS	6 ft 7 in (2.01 m)	235 lb (107 kg)	—	Jan 25, 2017
Nate Weinman; TE	Recruit ratings: Scout: Rivals: 247Sports: ESPN:					
Davon Wells–Ross; LB	Omaha, NE	Omaha North HS	6 ft 5 in (1.96 m)	190 lb (86 kg)	—	Oct 31, 2016
Davon Wells–Ross; LB	Recruit ratings: Scout: Rivals: 247Sports: ESPN:					
Trey Woods; ATH	North Bend, OR	North Bend HS	6 ft 3 in (1.91 m)	210 lb (95 kg)	—	Jan 14, 2017
Trey Woods; ATH	Recruit ratings: Scout: Rivals: 247Sports: ESPN:					
Tim Zaleski; P	Oak Lawn, IL	St. Rita HS	6 ft 5 in (1.96 m)	215 lb (98 kg)	—	Jan 7, 2017
Tim Zaleski; P	Recruit ratings: Scout: Rivals: 247Sports: ESPN:					
Overall recruit ranking: Scout: – Rivals: – 247Sports: – ESPN: –
‡ Refers to 40-yard dash; Note: In many cases, Scout, Rivals, 247Sports, On3, and ESPN may conflict in their listings of height, weight and 40 time.; In these cases, the average was taken. ESPN grades are on a 100-point scale.; Sources: "2017 Team Ranking". Rivals.com.

== Awards and honors ==
=== All-conference teams ===
First Team

Youhanna Ghaifan, So., DL

Carl Granderson, Jr., DL

Andrew Wingard, Jr., DB

Second Team

Logan Wilson, So., LB

Rico Gafford, Sr., DB

Honorable Mention

Josh Allen, Sr., QB

Tyler Hall, So., Ret

== Statistics ==
=== Team ===
Team Statistics
	Wyoming	Opponents
Points	305	228
First Downs	198	244
Rushing	76	128
Passing	105	98
Penalty	17	18
Rushing Yards	1414	2084
Rushing Attempts	446	599
Average Per Rush	3.2	3.5
Long	59	44
Rushing TDs	13	16
Passing Yards	2304	2274
Comp–Att	195–348	189–334
Comp %	56.0%	56.6%
Average Per Game	177.2	174.9
Average per Attempt	6.6	6.8
Passing TDs	18	11
INT's	8	20
Touchdowns	37	27
Passing	18	11
Rushing	13	16
Defensive	6	0
Interceptions	20	8
Yards	262	134
Total Offense	3718	4358
Total Plays	794	933
Average Per Yards/Game	286.0	335.2
Kick Returns: # – Yards	23–651	33–682
TDs	2	0
Long	97	38
Punts	88	65
Yards	3429	2892
Average	39.0	44.5
Punt Returns: # – Yards	23–236	25–118
TDs	0	0
Long	55	23
Fumbles – Fumbles Lost	12–6	28–18
Opposing TD's	27	37
Penalties – Yards	55–522	64–602
3rd–Down Conversions	60/181	75/205
4th–Down Conversions	9/14	15/26
Field Goals	15–18	13–17
Extra Point	36–37	27–27
Sacks	33	26
Sack Against	26	33
Yards	203	177

=== Offense ===
Passing Statistics
NAME	GP	CMP	ATT	YDS	CMP%	TD	INT
Josh Allen	11	152	270	1812	56.3	16	6
Nick Smith	7	40	74	471	54.1	2	2
Austin Conway	13	2	2	22	100.0	0	0
TEAM	7	0	1	0	0.0	0	0
Austin Fort	8	1	1	-1	100.0	0	0

Rushing Statistics
NAME	GP	CAR	YDS	LONG	TD
Trey Woods	12	142	493	59	2
Kellen Overstreet	13	109	481	38	3
Josh Allen	11	92	204	22	5
Milo Hall	11	34	90	14	0
Austin Conway	13	15	70	40	1
Nick Smith	7	20	22	15	1
Nico Evans	13	11	19	10	0
Austin Fort	8	4	18	8	1
C. J. Johnson	13	2	15	16	0
Avante' Cox	7	2	14	9	0
Drew Van Maanen	13	2	5	5	0
Jaylon Watson	13	0	1	0	0
TOTALS	13	446	1733	59	13

Receiving Statistics
NAME	GP	REC	YDS	LONG	TD
Austin Conway	13	62	553	41	3
C.J. Johnson	13	30	531	53	7
James Price	10	20	282	40	1
John Okwoli	12	12	137	23	1
Josh Harshman	13	12	136	31	0
Tyree Mayfield	13	11	108	18	0
Austin Fort	8	10	119	25	3
Nico Evans	13	10	70	15	1
Drew Van Maanen	13	7	108	30	0
Avante' Cox	7	5	79	39	0
Milo Hall	11	5	21	9	0
Trey Woods	12	4	74	38	0
Kellen Overstreet	13	3	39	30	0
Jared Scott	8	2	40	23	2
Dontae Crow	5	1	5	5	0
TOTALS	13	195	2304	53	18

=== Defense ===
Defensive Statistics
#	NAME	GP	SOLO	AST	TOT	TFL-YDS	SACKS	INT-YDS	BU	QBH	FR–YDS	FF	BLK	SAF
30	Logan Wilson	13	79	40	119	8.0–20	1.0–8	1–3	1	0	1–18	2	0	0
28	Andrew Wingard	13	70	44	114	8.0–17	1.0–1	5–54	3	0	1–0	2	0	0
91	Carl Granderson	13	37	40	77	16.0–61	9.5–50	2–43	0	4	1–58	2	0	1
46	Cassh Maluia	13	33	41	74	3.5–5	1.0–1	1–0	3	0	3–3	1	0	0
93	Youhanna Ghaifan	12	39	30	69	15.5–63	7.0–45	0–0	0	0	0–0	2	0	0
6	Marcus Epps	13	42	26	68	5.0–28	1.0–10	4–90	4	0	1–0	1	0	0
8	Jalen Ortiz	13	36	25	61	4.0–18	1.0–12	0–0	2	0	2–0	1	0	0
5	Rico Gafford	13	29	14	43	1.0–3	0.0–0	4–45	6	0	0–0	1	0	0
2	Robert Priester	13	28	11	39	4.0–7	1.0–2	0–0	4	0	0–0	2	0	0
42	Kevin Prosser	12	21	14	35	5.0–29	2.5–16	1–28	2	1	2–0	1	0	0
88	Garrett Crall	13	19	14	33	5.5–23	2.5–14	0–0	2	0	1–0	1	0	0
45	Adam Pilapil	8	15	16	31	0.0–0	0.0–0	0–0	1	0	0–0	0	0	0
9	Tyler Hall	13	19	11	30	0.5–1	0.0–0	2–(-1)	4	0	0–0	2	0	0
86	Javaree Jackson	11	8	16	24	1.5–1	0.0–0	0–0	0	0	0–0	0	0	0
53	Josiah Hall	12	12	12	24	2.5–10	0.5–5	0–0	0	1	0–0	0	0	0
96	Sidney Malauulu	7	7	15	22	1.5–7	1.0–6	0–0	0	0	2–0	0	0	0
58	Nela Lolohea	12	12	10	22	5.5–39	4.0–33	0–0	1	0	1–0	2	0	0
3	Alijah Halliburton	13	10	11	21	0.0–0	0.0–0	0–0	1	0	0–0	0	0	0
43	Ben Wisdorf	11	5	6	11	2.0–5	0.0–0	0–0	0	0	0–0	0	0	0
7	Chavez Pownell	13	6	4	10	0.0–0	0.0–0	0–0	0	0	0–0	0	0	0
98	Ravontae Holt	9	2	7	9	1.0–1	1.0–1	0–0	0	0	0–0	0	0	0
20	Esaias Gandy	12	4	4	8	0.0–0	0.0–0	0–0	0	0	0–0	0	0	0
23	Tim Kamana	13	5	2	7	0.0–0	0.0–0	0–0	0	0	0–0	0	0	0
87	Conner Cain	7	1	6	7	1.0–1	0.0–0	0–0	0	0	0–0	1	0	0
85	Tyree Mayfield	13	5	2	7	0.0–0	0.0–0	0–0	0	0	1–3	0	0	0
24	Braden Smith	11	4	2	6	0.0–0	0.0–0	0–0	0	0	1–0	1	0	0
54	Austin Lopez	13	2	2	4	0.0–0	0.0–0	0–0	0	0	0–0	0	0	0
22	Nico Evans	13	4	0	4	0.0–0	0.0–0	0–0	0	0	0–0	0	0	0
36	Drew Van Maanen	13	2	1	3	0.0–0	0.0–0	0–0	0	0	1–0	0	0	0
40	Cooper Rothe	13	1	2	3	0.0–0	0.0–0	0–0	0	0	0–0	0	0	0
50	Ryan Gatoloai-Faupula	7	1	2	3	0.0–0	0.0–0	0–0	1	0	0–0	0	0	0
26	Avante' Cox	7	3	0	3	0.0–0	0.0–0	0–0	0	0	0–0	0	0	0
59	Ryan Cummings	8	2	0	2	0.0–0	0.0–0	0–0	0	0	0–0	0	0	0
68	Dalton Fields	12	1	1	2	0.0–0	0.0–0	0–0	0	0	0–0	0	0	0
3	Milo Hall	11	2	0	2	0.0–0	0.0–0	0–0	0	0	0–0	1	0	0
1	Sidney Washington	2	2	0	2	0.0–0	0.0–0	0–0	0	0	0–0	0	0	0
52	Jahmari Moore	9	0	2	2	0.0–0	0.0–0	0–0	0	0	0–0	0	0	0
90	Kolton Donovan	2	0	1	1	0.0–0	0.0–0	0–0	0	0	0–0	0	0	0
76	Justis Borton	1	0	1	1	0.0–0	0.0–0	0–0	0	0	0–0	0	0	0
35	Jaylon Watson	13	0	1	1	0.0–0	0.0–0	0–0	0	0	0–0	0	0	0
33	Josh Harshman	13	1	0	1	0.0–0	0.0–0	0–0	0	0	0–0	0	0	0
72	Zach Wallace	13	1	0	1	0.0–0	0.0–0	0–0	0	0	0–0	0	0	0
67	Cole Turner	12	1	0	1	0.0–0	0.0–0	0–0	0	0	0–0	0	0	0
17	Josh Allen	11	0	1	1	0.0–0	0.0–0	0–0	0	0	0–0	0	0	0
80	James Price	10	1	0	1	0.0–0	0.0–0	0–0	0	0	0–0	0	0	0
29	Kellen Overstreet	13	0	1	1	0.0–0	0.0–0	0–0	0	0	0–0	0	0	0
14	C.J. Johnson	13	1	0	1	0.0–0	0.0–0	0–0	0	0	0–0	0	0	0
25	Austin Conway	13	1	0	1	0.0–0	0.0–0	0–0	0	0	0–0	0	0	0
	TOTAL	13	574	438	1012	91–339	33–203	20–262	35	6	18–82	23	0	1
	OPPONENTS	13	459	334	793	73–299	26–177	8–134	40	6	6–72	8	1	0

Key: SOLO: Solo Tackles, AST: Assisted Tackles, TOT: Total Tackles, TFL: Tackles-for-loss, SACK: Quarterback Sacks, INT: Interceptions, BU: Passes Broken Up, QBH: Quarterback Hits, FF: Forced Fumbles, FR: Fumbles Recovered, BLK: Kicks or Punts Blocked, SAF: Safeties

Interceptions Statistics
NAME	NO.	YDS	AVG	TD	LNG
Andrew Wingard	5	54	10.8	0	22
Marcus Epps	4	90	22.5	0	57
Rico Gafford	4	45	11.2	1	37
Carl Granderson	2	43	21.5	0	37
Tyler Hall	2	-1	-0.5	0	0
Cassh Maluia	1	0	0.0	0	0
Kevin Prosser	1	28	28.0	1	28
Logan Wilson	1	3	3.0	0	3
TOTALS	20	262	13.1	2	57

=== Special teams ===
Kicking statistics
NAME	XPM	XPA	XP%	FGM	FGA	FG%	1–19	20–29	30–39	40–49	50+	LNG	PTS
Cooper Rothe	36	37	97.3%	15	18	83.3%	0–0	10–10	2–2	3–6	0–0	49	81
TOTALS	36	37	97.3%	15	18	83.3%	0–0	10–10	2–2	3–6	0–0	49	81

Kick return statistics
NAME	RTNS	YDS	AVG	TD	LNG
Tyler Hall	15	508	33.9	2	97
Rico Gafford	2	44	22.0	0	24
Milo Hall	2	61	30.5	0	32
Garrett Crall	1	0	0.0	0	0
Adam Pilapil	1	1	1.0	0	1
Jaylon Watson	1	8	8.0	0	8
Nico Evans	1	29	29.0	0	29
TOTALS	23	651	28.3	2	97

Punting statistics
NAME	PUNTS	YDS	AVG	LONG	TB	FC	I–20	50+	BLK
Tim Zaleski	87	3409	39.2	65	4	31	33	8	1
TEAM	1	20	20.0	0	0	0	0	0	0
TOTALS	88	3429	39.0	65	4	31	33	8	1

Punt return statistics
NAME	RTNS	YDS	AVG	TD	LONG
Austin Conway	22	228	10.4	0	55
Dontae Crow	1	8	8.0	0	8
TOTALS	23	236	10.3	0	55

=== Scores by quarter (all opponents) ===
	1	2	3	4	OT	Total
All opponents	40	99	38	51	0	228
Wyoming	69	125	47	57	7	305

=== All-star games ===
Josh Allen – Senior Bowl

Rico Gafford – NFLPA Collegiate Bowl

== Players in the 2018 NFL draft ==
Player	Position	Round	Pick	NFL club
Josh Allen	QB	1	7	Buffalo Bills
Rico Gafford	CB	UDFA	-	Tennessee Titans
