= 2019 Senior Bowl =

2019 Reese's Senior Bowl
- 70th Senior Bowl
North Team	South Team
34	24
Head coach: Jon Gruden (Oakland Raiders)	Head coach: Kyle Shanahan (San Francisco 49ers)
	1	2	3	4	Total
North	0	3	17	14	34
South	9	3	0	12	24
- Date: January 26, 2019
- Season: 2018
- Stadium: Ladd–Peebles Stadium
- Location: Mobile, Alabama
- MVP: Daniel Jones (QB, Duke)
- Favorite: North by 2
- Referee: Duane Heydt (ACC)
- Halftime show: Million Dollar Band
- Attendance: 31,437

United States TV coverage
- Network: NFL Network
- Announcers: Andrew Siciliano (play-by-play), Charles Davis (color), Daniel Jeremiah (color), Bucky Brooks (sideline), Tom Pelissero (sideline)

The 2019 Senior Bowl was an all-star college football exhibition game played on January 26, 2019, at 1:30 p.m. CST, at Ladd–Peebles Stadium in Mobile, Alabama. The game featured prospects for the 2019 draft of the professional National Football League (NFL), predominantly from the 2018 NCAA Division I FBS football season, rostered into "North" and "South" teams. The game was the last of the 2018–19 bowl games and the final game of the 2018 FBS football season. It was sponsored by Reese's Peanut Butter Cups and officially known as the Reese's Senior Bowl, with television coverage provided by NFL Network.

Coaching staffs were announced on December 31, 2018; Jon Gruden and the Oakland Raiders staff for the North team, and Kyle Shanahan and the San Francisco 49ers staff for the South team.

== Players ==
In August 2018, bowl organizers had an initial "watch list" of 374 players, with a total of 110 players to be invited to the game. By mid-December, 95 players had accepted invitations to play in the game, with eight quarterbacks announced.

Players who accepted invitations to the game are listed on the official website. While team assignments follow general geographical guidelines (e.g. Penn State players on the North roster), there are multiple variances due to competitive and roster-balancing considerations (e.g. Buffalo players on the South roster).

=== North team ===
Full roster online here.

No.	Player	Position	HT/WT	College	Notes
23	Nasir Adderley	S	6'0/200	Delaware	Interception w/ 16-yard return; 5 tackles
44	Zach Allen	DE	6'5/285	Boston College	
1	Corey Ballentine	CB	6'0/204	Washburn (DII)	5 tackles
52	Ben Banogu	OLB	6'4/249	TCU	
66	Beau Benzschawel	OG	6'6/315	Wisconsin	
13	Marquise Blair	S	6'2/195	Utah	
2	Kris Boyd	CB	6'0/195	Texas	
65	Garrett Bradbury	C	6'3/300	North Carolina State	
11	Jordan Brown	CB	6'1/195	South Dakota State	4 tackles
91	L. J. Collier	DE	6'4/276	TCU	3 tackles, 2 sacks
5	John Cominsky	DE	6'5/275	Charleston (DII)	
9	Te'Von Coney	ILB	6'1/240	Notre Dame	Fumble recovery; 4 tackles
92	Byron Cowart	DE	6'4/293	Maryland	
64	Nate Davis	OG	6'3/311	Charlotte	
63	Michael Deiter	OG	6'6/310	Wisconsin	
8	Keelan Doss	WR	6'3/206	UC Davis	4 rec, 55 yds
70	Chuma Edoga	OT	6'4/295	USC	Named practice player of the week
15	Ryan Finley	QB	6'4/212	North Carolina State	3rd/4th quarter QB (7-for-11, 83 yds)
98	Greg Gaines	DT	6'2/316	Washington	3 tackles
97	Dan Godsil	LS	6'4/233	Indiana	
36	Dre Greenlaw	OLB	6'0/229	Arkansas	3 tackles
8	Will Harris	S	6'2/210	Boston College	2 tackles
18	Penny Hart	WR	5'8/180	Georgia State	1 rec, 7 yds
22	Karan Higdon	RB	5'10/202	Michigan	5 car, 18 yds
45	Alec Ingold	FB	6'2/242	Wisconsin	1 car, 7 yds; 1 rec, 11 yds
5	Andy Isabella	WR	5'10/195	UMass	7 rec, 74 yds, 1 TD; 1 car, 14 yds
97	Jalen Jelks	DE	6'6/245	Oregon	
17	Daniel Jones	QB	6'5/220	Duke	3rd quarter QB (8-for-11, 115 yds, 1 TD), TD rushing
75	Chris Lindstrom	OG	6'4/310	Boston College	
3	Drew Lock	QB	6'4/225	Missouri	1st quarter QB (9-for-14, 57 yds)
24	Iman Marshall	CB	6'1/205	USC	
78	Erik McCoy	C	6'4/315	Texas A&M	
58	Kaleb McGary	OT	6'8/324	Washington	
10	Terry McLaurin	WR	6'1/205	Ohio State	4 rec, 53 yds; 1 car, 19 yds
9	Trace McSorley	QB	6'0/203	Penn State	2nd quarter QB (7-for-13, 59 yds)
11	Jakobi Meyers	WR	6'2/203	North Carolina State	1 rec, 15 yds
93	Anthony Nelson	DE	6'7/271	Iowa	Forced fumble
90	Charles Omenihu	DE	6'6/275	Texas	Forced fumble; 3 tackles, 1 sack
21	Amani Oruwariye	CB	6'1/201	Penn State	
49	Donald Parham	TE	6'8/240	Stetson	
1	Tony Pollard	RB	6'0/208	Memphis	8 car, 60 yds, 1 TD; 2 rec, 13 yds
3	Germaine Pratt	ILB	6'3/240	North Carolina State	
71	Dalton Risner	OT	6'5/308	Kansas State	
88	Drew Sample	TE	6'5/251	Washington	4 rec, 39 yds
99	Khalen Saunders	DT	6'2/310	Western Illinois	3 tackles, 1 sack
4	Darnell Savage	S	5'11/200	Maryland	
73	Max Scharping	OT	6'6/320	Northern Illinois	
43	Austin Seibert	K	5'9/214	Oklahoma	2-for-3 FG, 4 PAT
35	Cameron Smith	ILB	6'2/250	USC	3 tackles
15	Sutton Smith	OLB	6'1/237	Northern Illinois	
12	Jaylen Smith	WR	6'4/220	Louisville	1 rec, 12 yds
89	Tommy Sweeney	TE	6'5/260	Boston College	
42	Drue Tranquill	OLB	6'2/233	Notre Dame	2 tackles
81	Alex Wesley	WR	6'0/184	Northern Colorado	
2	Dexter Williams	RB	5'11/215	Notre Dame	11 car, 39 yds, 1 TD; 1 rec, 4 yds
27	Khari Willis	S	6'0/215	Michigan State	
87	Caleb Wilson	TE	6'4/235	UCLA	4 rec, 24 yds
33	Mitch Wishnowsky	P	6'2/220	Utah	2 punts, 59.5 avg, 62 long
95	Renell Wren	DT	6'6/297	Arizona State	

=== South team ===
Full roster online here.

No.	Player	Position	HT/WT	College	Notes
38	Johnathan Abram	S	6'0/215	Mississippi State	
25	Ryquell Armstead	RB	5'11/215	Temple	7 car, 24 yds, 1 TD; 2 rec, 12 yds
79	B. J. Autry	OG	6'5/340	Jacksonville State	
14	Jake Bailey	P	6'2/202	Stanford	3 punts, 53.0 avg, 61 long
11	Tyre Brady	WR	6'3/206	Marshall	
90	Demarcus Christmas	DT	6'4/305	Florida State	
49	Isaiah Buggs	DT	6'2/286	Alabama	3 tackles
78	Dennis Daley	OT	6'6/324	South Carolina	
57	Deshaun Davis	ILB	5'11/246	Auburn	
60	Andre Dillard	OT	6'5/306	Washington State	
32	Mike Edwards	S	6'0/200	Kentucky	
45	Jaylon Ferguson	DE	6'5/262	Louisiana Tech	
26	Mark Fields	CB	5'11/180	Clemson	
15	Travis Fulgham	WR	6'3/215	Old Dominion	
91	Carl Granderson	DE	6'5/261	Wyoming	
40	Gerri Green	OLB	6'4/255	Mississippi State	
7	Will Grier	QB	6'2/223	West Virginia	1st quarter QB (4-for-8, 61 yds)
27	Darrin Hall	RB	5'11/235	Pittsburgh	
2	Terrill Hanks	OLB	6'2/230	New Mexico State	
31	Wes Hills†	RB	6'2/218	Slippery Rock (DII)	2 car, 22 yds
58	Tytus Howard	OT	6'6/311	Alabama State	
3	Tyree Jackson	QB	6'7/245	Buffalo	4th quarter QB (13-for-21, 165 yds, 2 TD, 1 INT)
74	Elgton Jenkins	OC	6'4/310	Mississippi State	
12	Gary Jennings Jr.	WR	6'1/210	West Virginia	2 rec, 64 yds, 1 TD
83	Anthony Johnson	WR	6'2/210	Buffalo	1 rec, 14 yds
14	Isaiah Johnson	CB	6'4/203	Houston	
4	Jaquan Johnson	S	5'11/195	Miami	
1	Lonnie Johnson Jr.	CB	6'3/206	Kentucky	
8	Kingsley Keke	DT	6'4/305	Texas A&M	
13	Jonathan Ledbetter	DE	6'4/280	Georgia	
11	David Long Jr.	ILB	5'11/221	West Virginia	
34	Daylon Mack	DT	6'1/320	Texas A&M	
16	Gardner Minshew	QB	6'2/220	Washington State	2nd quarter QB (1-for-8, 4 yds)
43	Nick Moore	LS	6'3/250	Georgia	
18	Foster Moreau	TE	6'6/256	LSU	
17	Jimmy Moreland	CB	5'11/175	James Madison	
20	Bobby Okereke	ILB	6'3/234	Stanford	
89	Josh Oliver	TE	6'5/250	San Jose State	
70	Javon Patterson	OG	6'3/314	Ole Miss	
71	Ross Pierschbacher	OC	6'4/309	Alabama	
72	Ben Powers	OG	6'4/313	Oklahoma	
87	Dax Raymond	TE	6'5/250	Utah State	
22	Sheldrick Redwine	CB	6'1/195	Miami	
13	Hunter Renfrow	WR	5'10/180	Clemson	5 rec, 63 yds
95	Dontavius Russell	DT	6'3/320	Auburn	
75	Dru Samia	OG	6'5/303	Oklahoma	
1	Deebo Samuel	WR	6'0/210	South Carolina	1 rec, 15 yds
21	David Sills	WR	6'4/210	West Virginia	2 rec, 28 yds, 1 TD
8	Jarrett Stidham	QB	6'3/215	Auburn	3rd quarter QB (4-for-5, 30 yds)
9	Montez Sweat	DE	6'6/245	Mississippi State	
16	Sione Takitaki	OLB	6'2/230	BYU	
21	Juan Thornhill	S	6'0/210	Virginia	
36	Cole Tracy	K	5'10/183	LSU	2 FG, 0-for-1 PAT
73	Oli Udoh	OT	6'5/356	Elon	
88	Trevon Wesco	FB	6'4/274	West Virginia	
25	Darius West	S	6'0/210	Kentucky	
7	Oshane Ximines	DE	6'4/255	Old Dominion	
6	Rock Ya-Sin	CB	6'2/190	Temple	

†Hills was MVP of 2019 NFLPA Collegiate Bowl

== Game summary ==
=== Scoring summary ===
Scoring summary

Quarter	Time	Drive			Team	Scoring information	Score	
Quarter	Time	Plays	Yards	TOP	Team	Scoring information	North	South
1	10:18	9	76	4:42	South	Ryquell Armstead 1-yard touchdown run, Cole Tracy kick no good (wide right)	0	6
1	3:41	9	65	4:17	South	33-yard field goal by Tracy	0	9
2	7:47	16	77	7:17	North	20-yard field goal by Austin Seibert	3	9
2	0:27	4	0	0:13	South	43-yard field goal by Tracy	3	12
3	10:20	10	84	4:40	North	Daniel Jones 1-yard touchdown run, Seibert kick good	10	12
3	8:10	2	44	0:45	North	Andy Isabella 19-yard touchdown reception from Jones, Seibert kick good	17	12
3	0:29	13	70	5:32	North	29-yard field goal by Seibert	20	12
4	12:06	8	78	3:23	South	Gary Jennings Jr. 10-yard touchdown reception from Tyree Jackson, 2-point run failed	20	18
4	8:05	8	75	4:01	North	Dexter Williams 3-yard touchdown run, Seibert kick good	27	18
4	3:17	4	35	2:26	North	Tony Pollard 21-yard touchdown run, Seibert kick good	34	18
4	0:14	13	75	3:03	South	David Sills 15-yard touchdown reception from Jackson, 2-point pass failed	34	24
"TOP" = time of possession. For other American football terms, see Glossary of American football.							34	24

Note: special playing rules detailed here.

=== Statistics ===
	1	2	3	4	Total
North	0	3	17	14	34
South	9	3	0	12	24

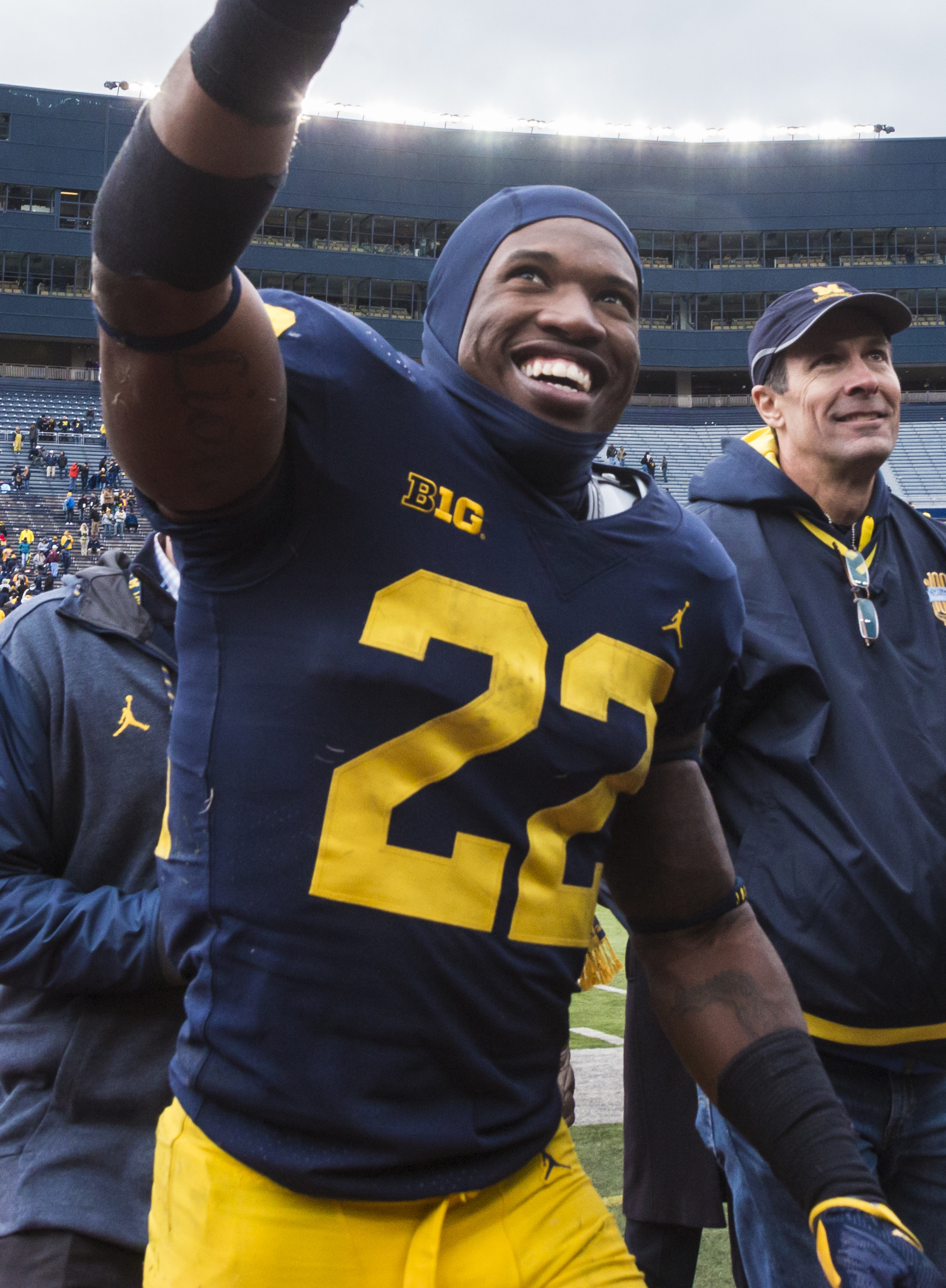
Running back Karan Higdon of the North team

Statistics	North	South
First downs	30	21
Plays–yards	82–491	57–284
Rushes–yards	32–179	15–53
Passing yards	312	231
Passing: comp–att–int	31–50–0	24–42–1
Time of possession	36:14	23:46

Team	Category	Player	Statistics
North	Passing	Daniel Jones (Duke)	8–11, 115 yds, 1 TD
North	Rushing	Tony Pollard (Memphis)	8 car, 60 yds, 1 TD
North	Receiving	Andy Isabella (UMass)	7 rec, 74 yds, 1 TD
South	Passing	Tyree Jackson (Buffalo)	13–21, 165 yds, 2 TD, 1 INT
South	Rushing	Ryquell Armstead (Temple)	7 car, 24 yds, 1 TD
South	Receiving	Gary Jennings Jr. (West Virginia)	2 rec, 64 yds, 1 TD
