= Fred Mitchell Award =

- Sport: American college football
- Awarded for: Best non-FBS placekicker
- Country: United States

History
- First award: 2009
- First winner: Jeff Schebler, UW–Whitewater
- Most recent: Aidan Ellison, North Central (IL)
- Website: fredmitchellaward.com

The Fred Mitchell Outstanding Place-Kicker Award, or simply the Fred Mitchell Award, is given to the nation's top collegiate placekicker among all the teams from the NCAA D-I FCS, NCAA D-II, NCAA D-III, NAIA and the NJCAA. Over 750 institutions are affiliated with one of those athletic associations.

The award is named after Fred Mitchell, a placekicker for the Wittenberg Tigers who set the record for most points scored in the NCAA College Division during his career in the 1960s. Mitchell is a member of the Wittenberg College Athletics Hall of Famer, and he worked as a Chicago Tribune sports columnist.

== Criteria ==
The recipient of the award is chosen based on his excellence on the football field and in his community.

== Winners ==
Season	Winner	School	Conference	Affiliation	Ref.
2009	Jeff Schebler	UW–Whitewater	WIAC	NCAA D-III	
2010	Tom Lynch	Saint Xavier	MSFA	NAIA	
2011	Tom Lynch (2)	Saint Xavier	MSFA	NAIA	
2012	Patrick Murray	Fordham	PL	FCS	
2013	Sergio Castillo	West Texas A&M	LSC	NCAA D-II	
2014	Tom Obarski	Concordia–St. Paul	NSIC	NCAA D-II	
2015	Matt Cotiguala	St. Ambrose	MSFA	NAIA	
2016	Matt Davis	UNC Pembroke	MEC	NCAA D-II	
2017	Cole Tracy	Assumption	NE-10	NCAA D-II	
2018	Roldan Alcobendas	Eastern Washington	Big Sky	FCS	
2019	Luis Aguilar	Northern Arizona	Big Sky	FCS	
2020	No winner				
2021	Ethan Ratke	James Madison	CAA	FCS	
2022	Ethan Gettman	Bryant	Big South	FCS	
2023	Landon Reeves	Ottawa (AZ)	SAC	NAIA	
2024	Gabe Panikowski	Idaho State	Big Sky	FCS	
2025	Aidan Ellison	North Central (IL)	CCIW	NCAA D-III	

== Selection committee ==
A blue-ribbon selection committee evaluates place-kickers that are nominated by their schools.

Members of the Pro Football Hall of Fame and/or College Football Hall of Fame on the Selection Committee include:

- Tom Beck: retired Head Coach of Illinois Benedictine, Elmhurst and Grand Valley State, College Football Hall of Famer (inducted 2004), board member for the National Football Foundation Chicago Metro Chapter
- Kevin Butler: place-kicker for the Chicago Bears and Arizona Cardinals, the only player to be inducted into the College Football Hall of Fame solely as a place-kicker (inducted 2001), played for the Georgia Bulldogs, named to the collegiate All-Century teams for Sports Illustrated and the Walter Camp Foundation
- Paul Hornung: 1956 Heisman Trophy winner, two-time All-American from Notre Dame, College Football Hall of Famer (inducted 1985), Pro Football Hall of Famer (inducted 1986), Green Bay Packers halfback and place-kicker
- Marv Levy: Pro Football Hall of Fame Head Coach (inducted 2001), Head Coach for the Buffalo Bills and Kansas City Chiefs, college coach at Coe College, Wyoming and Harvard, kicking teams coach for the Philadelphia Eagles, special teams coach for the Los Angeles Rams
- Steve McMichael: two-time All-American from the University of Texas, College Football Hall of Famer (inducted 2009), place-kicker and defensive tackle with the Longhorns, defensive tackle for the Chicago Bears and Green Bay Packers, head coach for the Chicago Slaughter (2009 Continental Indoor Football League Champions), board member for the National Football Foundation Chicago Metro Chapter
- Don Pierson: retired Chicago Tribune pro football sportswriter, member of the Pro Football Hall of Fame writers' wing
- Gale Sayers: Chicago Bears and Kansas Jayhawks running back, College Football Hall of Famer (inducted 1977), Pro Football Hall of Famer (inducted 1977), named NFL all-time halfback, NFL lifetime kickoff return leader, Sayers Corporation and the Gale Sayers Center

Former football players and others that are active in their communities are also on the Selection Committee including:

- Carl Allegretti: Chairman and CEO of Deloitte Tax, NFF Outstanding Contribution to Amateur Football Award, played football at Butler University
- Sergio Castillo: 2013 Fred Mitchell Award recipient from West Texas A&M whose 437 career points is the most in school, conference and Division II history
- Sean Gothier: National Football Foundation Minnesota Chapter Board President, Buffalo Wild Wings Citrus Bowl Team Selection Committee
- Teddy Greenstein: Chicago Tribune college football sportswriter, Heisman Trophy voter
- Randy Helt: record-setting place-kicker at Susquehanna University in 1988 and 1989, named to various All-American teams, one of three place-kickers invited to 1990 NFL Scouting Combine, instructor at kicking camps for Washington Redskins All-Pro kicker Mark Mosele
- Michael Husted: NFL place-kicker for 9 seasons and at the University of Virginia, Founder of the National Camp Series nationwide network of kicking coaches, kicking coach/consultant
- Dan Jiggetts: Ivy League Hall of Famer, captain of Harvard's football team, Chicago Bears offensive lineman, board member for the National Football Foundation Chicago Metro Chapter, Comcast SportsNet
- Chris Kearney: National Football Foundation Chicago Metro Chapter Board President, Buffalo Wild Wings Citrus Bowl Team Selection Committee, Tatum Managing Partner of the Central Region
- Rick Kolaczewski: National Football Foundation Chicago Metro Chapter board member and US LBM chief financial officer
- Conrad "Connie" Kowal: Libertyville Sports Complex, sports marketing executive formerly with the New Orleans Saints and Chicago Cubs
- Greg Loberg: Managing Partner and Founder of Loberg Miki O'Brien accounting and tax professional services firm
- Nick Lowery: Pro Football Hall of Fame nominee, Kansas City Chiefs Hall of Fame kicker, Dartmouth kicker, motivational speaker
- Tom Lynch: 2011 and 2010 Fred Mitchell Award recipient, place-kicker for 2011 NAIA National Champions Saint Xavier University
- Jeff Michalczyk: linebacker at Drake University, received the National Football Foundation St. Louis Chapter Scholar-Athlete Award, The Private Bank managing director
- Fred Mitchell: Wittenberg University Athletic Hall of Fame (inducted 1995), Chicago Tribune sports columnist and author
- Carol Monroe: Florida Citrus Sports Senior Director of Hospitality & Collegiate Conference Relations
- Mark Murphy: Green Bay Packers President, Team Captain on the Washington Redskins Super Bowl teams in 1983 and 1984
- Patrick Murray: Tampa Bay Buccaneers kicker, 2012 Fred Mitchell Award recipient whose 25 field goals at Fordham University in 2012 were just one shy of the all-time FCS record at the time
- Tom Obarski: 2014 Fred Mitchell Award recipient, record-setting kicker and punter at Concordia-St. Paul including 44 career field goals
- Rob Perry: Buffalo Wild Wings Citrus Bowl Team Selection Committee, high school football referee
- Michael Ritchey: National Football Foundation Chicago Metro Chapter board member, longtime Penn State football supporter
- Jeff Schebler: 2009 Fred Mitchell Award recipient, four-time All-American place-kicker from the University of Wisconsin-Whitewater, scored more points than any place-kicker in NCAA history at any level
- Caroline Schrenker: Indiana University Northwest Assistant Director of Community Education, Bears Care board of directors, board member for the National Football Foundation Chicago Metro Chapter
- Bob Thomas: kicked the winning field goal for Notre Dame to win the 1974 National Championship, NCAA Silver Award winner, Academic All-American, place-kicker for ten seasons with the Chicago Bears, kicked one season each for the Detroit Lions and San Diego Chargers, former Chief Justice of Illinois Supreme Court
- Wolfe Tone: board member for the National Football Foundation Chicago Metro Chapter, Herky Hawkeye mascot at the University of Iowa, Deloitte Tax Partner
- Todd Wilkins: place-kicker for the University of Wisconsin-Whitewater conference championship teams in the late 1980s
- Gary Zauner: place-kicker for the University of Wisconsin-LaCrosse, NFL and College Kicking Consultant and Special Teams Coach for 13 years in the NFL with Minnesota, Baltimore and Arizona
- Rob Zvonar: Head Football Coach at Lincoln-Way East High School, 2005 Illinois State Champions, 2007 Coach at the U.S. Army All-American Bowl

== Recognition ==
The Award's Watch List is released in August, top performers are recognized monthly during the college football season, and the winner (who is not required to be on the Watch List) is announced in mid-December.

The school of the award winner receives scholarship funds and the Fred Mitchell Award trophy is presented each February at the National Football Foundation Chicago Metro Chapter Awards Ceremony at Halas Hall.

== About Fred Mitchell ==
Fred Mitchell is a long-time Chicago Tribune sports columnist who enjoyed a distinguished career as one of the nation's first prominent small-college place-kicking specialists at Wittenberg University in Springfield, Ohio.

During the mid-1960s, Mitchell set the NCAA "College Division" record for career points scored by kicking while playing in the Ohio Athletic Conference for the legendary Bill Edwards, who later was inducted into the College Football Hall of Fame. Edwards had previously served as head coach of the Detroit Lions (1941–42) and as an assistant coach to Paul Brown with the Cleveland Browns. It was with the Browns that Edwards tutored Pro Football Hall of Fame kicker Lou Groza.
