= 2017 Famous Idaho Potato Bowl =

- 21st Famous Idaho Potato Bowl
Central Michigan Chippewas	Wyoming Cowboys
(8–4)	(7–5)
MAC	Mountain West
14	37
Head coach: John Bonamego	Head coach: Craig Bohl
	1	2	3	4	Total
Central Michigan	7	0	7	0	14
Wyoming	21	6	3	7	37
- Date: December 22, 2017
- Season: 2017
- Stadium: Albertsons Stadium
- Location: Boise, Idaho
- MVP: Josh Allen
- Favorite: Wyoming by 3
- Referee: Steve LaMantia (C-USA)
- Attendance: 16,512
- Payout: US$1,050,000

United States TV coverage
- Network: ESPN
- Announcers: Roy Philpott, Tom Ramsey, and Alex Corddry

The 2017 Famous Idaho Potato Bowl was a college football bowl game played on Friday, December 22, 2017, at Albertsons Stadium in Boise, Idaho. The 21st annual Famous Idaho Potato Bowl, it was one of the 2017–18 bowl games concluding the 2017 FBS football season. The game was sponsored by the Idaho Potato Commission.

The game featured the Wyoming Cowboys (7–5) of the Mountain West Conference and the Central Michigan Chippewas (8–4) of the Mid-American Conference. The teams had played twice before; in 2000 (Wyoming won, 20–10), and in 2002 (Central Michigan won, 32–20).

With a temperature of 37 °F (3 °C) at kickoff, the game started at 2:05 pm MST (4:05 pm EST) and was broadcast by ESPN. The Cowboys led by twenty points at the half and defeated the Chippewas, 37–14.

== Central Michigan Chippewas ==
Central Michigan finished their regular season with an 8–4 record overall (6–2 in conference). This was their first Famous Idaho Potato Bowl.

== Wyoming Cowboys ==
Wyoming finished their regular season with a 7–5 record overall (5–3 in conference). This was their first Famous Idaho Potato Bowl.

== Scoring summary ==
Scoring summary

Quarter	Time	Drive			Team	Scoring information	Score	
Quarter	Time	Plays	Yards	TOP	Team	Scoring information	CMU	WYO
1	7:55	5	46	2:13	WYO	Jared Scott 23-yard touchdown reception from Josh Allen, Cooper Rothe kick good	0	7
1	4:38	5	24	2:52	WYO	Austin Conway 11-yard touchdown reception from Josh Allen, Cooper Rothe kick good	0	14
1	3:10	3	85	1:28	CMU	Jonathan Ward 74-yard touchdown reception from Shane Morris, Michael Armstrong kick good	7	14
1	1:09	4	65	2:01	WYO	C.J. Johnson 45-yard touchdown reception from Josh Allen, Cooper Rothe kick good	7	21
2	13:48	4	8	1:21	WYO	27-yard field goal by Cooper Rothe	7	24
2	4:57	5	17	1:57	WYO	28-yard field goal by Cooper Rothe	7	27
3	5:15	11	61	5:26	WYO	20-yard field goal by Cooper Rothe	7	30
3	3:08	7	65	2:07	CMU	Jonathan Ward 3-yard touchdown run, Michael Armstrong kick good	14	30
4	11:23	-	-	-	WYO	Fumble recovery returned 58 yards for touchdown by Carl Granderson, Cooper Rothe kick good	14	37
"TOP" = time of possession. For other American football terms, see Glossary of American football.							14	37

- Source

=== Statistics ===
	1	2	3	4	Total
Chippewas	7	0	7	0	14
Cowboys	21	6	3	7	37

Statistics	CMU	WYO
First downs	18	15
Total offense, yards	364	275
Rushes-yards (net)	27–18	42–121
Passing yards (net)	346	154
Passes, Comp-Att-Int	26–43–4	11–19–0
Time of Possession	29:14	30:46

Team	Category	Player	Statistics
Central Michigan	Passing	Shane Morris	23/39, 329 yds, 1 TD, 4 INT
Central Michigan	Rushing	Jonathan Ward	12 car, 29 yds, 1 TD
Central Michigan	Receiving	Jonathan Ward	7 rec, 109 yds, 1 TD
Wyoming	Passing	Josh Allen	11/19, 154 yds, 3 TDs
Wyoming	Rushing	Kellen Overstreet	21 car, 85 yds
Wyoming	Receiving	C.J. Johnson	3 rec, 63 yds, 1 TD

- Source
