= Terrill Hanks =

American football player (born 1995)

Michigan Arrows
- Title: Defensive line coach

Personal information
- Born: December 7, 1995 (age 30); Miami, Florida, U.S.
- Listed height: 6 ft 3 in (1.91 m)
- Listed weight: 225 lb (102 kg)

Career information
- Position: Linebacker
- High school: Immaculata-LaSalle
- College: New Mexico State
- NFL draft: 2019: undrafted

Career history

Playing
- Miami Dolphins (2019–2020)*; Birmingham Stallions (2022); DC Defenders (2023); San Antonio Brahmas (2023); Memphis Showboats (2024)
- * Offseason or practice squad member only

Coaching
- Anna Maria Amcats (2026–present) Defensive line coach

Awards and highlights
- USFL champion (2022)
- Stats at Pro Football Reference

Terrill Hanks (born December 7, 1995) is an American football linebacker for the Michigan Arrows of the Continental Football League (CoFL). He played college football at New Mexico State. He played for the Birmingham Stallions of the United States Football League (USFL), DC Defenders and San Antonio Brahmas of the XFL, and Memphis Showboats of the United Football League (UFL).

== Early life ==
Hanks grew up in Miami Gardens, Florida, close to Hard Rock Stadium and was a fan of the Miami Dolphins in his childhood. He attended Immaculata-LaSalle High School and played safety for the Royal Lions football team and made over 100 tackles as a senior. Rated a two-star prospect by Rivals.com, but did not qualify academically for an NCAA scholarship until late in his senior year. Hanks committed to play college football at New Mexico State, one of only two schools to offer him a scholarship along with Appalachian State.

== College career ==
Hanks played four seasons for the New Mexico State Aggies. After bulking up and moving from the defensive secondary to linebacker, he started all but one game as a freshman and recorded 81 tackles with 6.5 tackles for loss, four pass deflections, and a forced fumble and was named to the Sun Belt Conference All-Newcomer team. He made 111 total tackles, 15 of which were for a loss, with seven sacks and two forced fumbles as a junior, earning honorable mention All-Sun Belt honors. As a senior, Hanks recorded 101 tackles with 9.0 tackles for loss, three pass deflections, a fumble recovery and a forced fumble in only nine games after missing three contests due to an ankle injury. Over the course of his collegiate career, he accumulated 391 tackles (fourth-most in Aggies history), 43.0 tackles for loss, 11 sacks and 8 interceptions along with 14 passes defensed, three fumble recoveries and seven forced fumbles. After his final season, Hanks earned an invitation to participate in the 2019 Senior Bowl as a member of the South team, where he impressed scouts in practice. In the game Hanks registered eight tackles, tied with Deshaun Davis for most in the game, as the South lost to team North 34–24.

== Professional career ==
=== Miami Dolphins ===
Hanks went unselected in the 2019 NFL draft. Shortly after the draft concluded, he signed with the Miami Dolphins as an undrafted free agent. He was waived on September 1, 2019, and was re-signed to the practice squad. He signed a futures contract with the team on December 31, 2019. Hanks was waived by the Dolphins on April 26, 2020.

=== Birmingham Stallions ===
Hanks was drafted by the Birmingham Stallions in the 30th round of the 2022 USFL draft. He was transferred to the active roster on April 30, 2022, due to a hamstring injury. He was moved back to the active roster on May 6. He was released on January 2, 2023.

=== DC Defenders ===
On January 1, 2023, Hanks was selected by the DC Defenders in the seventh round of the 2023 XFL Supplemental Draft. He signed with the team on March 8, 2023, and was released on March 20.

=== San Antonio Brahmas ===
Hanks was claimed off waivers by the San Antonio Brahmas on March 22, 2023. He was not part of the roster after the 2024 UFL dispersal draft on January 15, 2024.

=== Memphis Showboats ===
On May 8, 2024, Hanks signed with the Memphis Showboats of the United Football League (UFL). He re-signed with the team on September 19, 2024. He was released on November 26, 2024.

Michigan Arrows

On March 30, 2026, the Michigan Arrows of the Continental Football League (CoFL) posted on Instagram that they had signed Hanks.
