= Gerri Green =

American football player (born 1995)

No. 91, 99
- Position: Defensive end

Personal information
- Born: September 14, 1995 (age 31); Greenville, Mississippi, U.S.
- Listed height: 6 ft 4 in (1.93 m)
- Listed weight: 250 lb (113 kg)

Career information
- High school: Greenville
- College: Mississippi State (2014–2018)
- NFL draft: 2019: 6th round, 199th overall pick

Career history
- Indianapolis Colts (2019)*; New England Patriots (2019)*; Indianapolis Colts (2019–2020)*; Washington Football Team (2020)*; Las Vegas Raiders (2020–2022)*; Tennessee Titans (2022)*; Chicago Bears (2022)
- * Offseason or practice squad member only
- Stats at Pro Football Reference

Gerri Germaine Green (pronounced Gary) (born September 14, 1995) is a former American professional football defensive end. He played college football at Mississippi State and was selected by the Indianapolis Colts in the sixth round of the 2019 NFL draft. He has also been a member of the New England Patriots, Washington Football Team, Las Vegas Raiders, Tennessee Titans and Chicago Bears.

== Early life ==
Green was born in Jackson, Mississippi and grew up in Greenville, Mississippi. He attended Greenville High School, where he was a standout defensive player for the Hornets. Rated a four-star recruit by several talent evaluators, Green played in the Mississippi-Alabama All-Star and the Semper Fidelis Bowl after recording 98 tackles, including 11.5 for loss, and 5.0 sacks in his senior year. He committed to play football at Mississippi State over offers from Arkansas, Auburn, Louisiana-Lafayette, Ole Miss, Tennessee, and Vanderbilt.

== College career ==
Green spent five seasons as a member of the Mississippi State Bulldogs, redshirting his freshman season. As a redshirt freshman, Green made 49 tackles, 2.5 of which were tackles for loss, and intercepted two passes and was named to the Southeastern Conference (SEC) All-Freshman team. He played defensive end and served as a team captain in his redshirt senior season and recorded 31 tackles, 6.5 tackles for loss and 3.5 sacks. Over the course of his collegiate career, Green made 161 career tackles (20.5 for loss) with 8.5 sacks. Off the field, Green was named to the SEC Community Service Team and was nominated for the 2018 Wuerffel Trophy. Following the end his final season, Green received an invitation to play in the 2019 Senior Bowl and made four tackles in the game.

== Professional career ==
Pre-draft measurables
Height	Weight	Arm length	Hand span	40-yard dash	20-yard shuttle	Three-cone drill	Vertical jump	Broad jump	Bench press
6 ft 4 in (1.93 m)	252 lb (114 kg)	33 in (0.84 m)	10 in (0.25 m)	4.63 s	4.42 s	7.27 s	35.0 in (0.89 m)	9 ft 6 in (2.90 m)	24 reps
All values from NFL Combine

=== Indianapolis Colts (first stint) ===
Green was drafted by the Indianapolis Colts in the sixth round (199th overall) of the 2019 NFL draft. Green signed a rookie contract with the team on May 3, 2019. He was waived by the Colts during final roster cuts on August 31, 2019.

=== New England Patriots ===
On September 2, 2019, Green was signed to the practice squad of the New England Patriots. He was released on September 20, 2019.

=== Indianapolis Colts (second stint) ===
Green rejoined the Colts after being signed to the team's practice squad on September 23, 2019. He signed a reserve/future contract with the Colts on December 30, 2019. On September 5, 2020, Green was waived and signed to the practice squad the next day. He was released on September 15, 2020.

=== Washington Football Team ===
Green signed with the Washington Football Team's practice squad on October 16, 2020. He was released on October 26.

=== Las Vegas Raiders ===
On November 3, 2020, Green was signed to the Las Vegas Raiders practice squad. He signed a reserve/future contract on January 5, 2021.

On August 31, 2021, Green was waived by the Raiders and re-signed to the practice squad the next day. After the Raiders were eliminated in the 2021 Wild Card round of the playoffs, he signed a reserve/future contract on January 17, 2022.

On August 16, 2022, Green was waived by the Raiders.

=== Tennessee Titans ===
On September 15, 2022, Green signed with the practice squad of the Tennessee Titans. He was released on October 24.

=== Chicago Bears ===
On October 27, 2022, Green was signed to the Chicago Bears practice squad. He signed a reserve/future contract on January 9, 2023. On April 28, Green was released by the Bears.
