= Max Scharping =

American football player (born 1996)

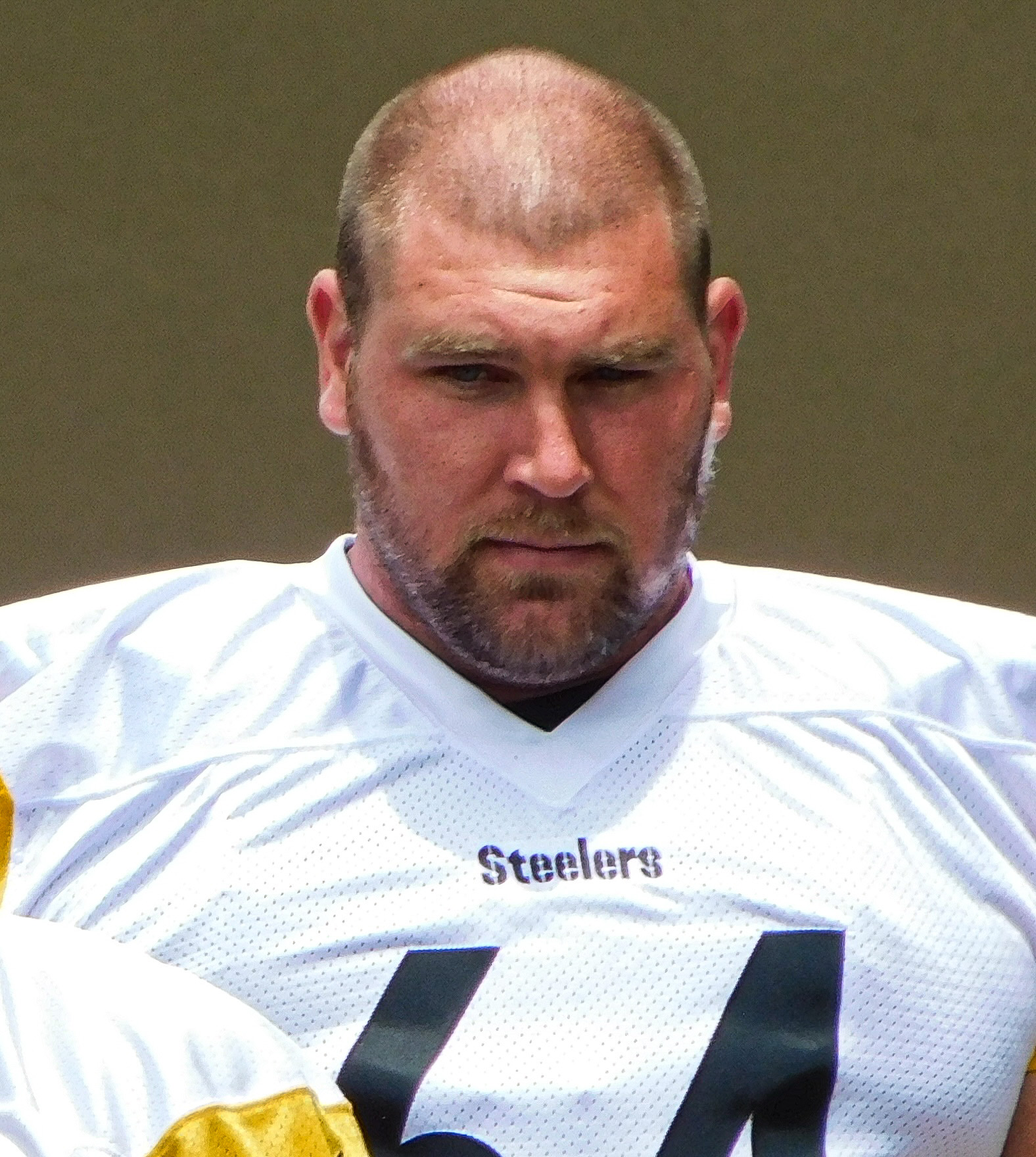
- Scharping with the Pittsburgh Steelers in 2025

Profile
- Position: Guard

Personal information
- Born: August 10, 1996 (age 30); Green Bay, Wisconsin, U.S.
- Listed height: 6 ft 6 in (1.98 m)
- Listed weight: 327 lb (148 kg)

Career information
- High school: Southwest (Green Bay)
- College: Northern Illinois (2014–2018)
- NFL draft: 2019: 2nd round, 55th overall pick

Career history
- Houston Texans (2019–2021); Cincinnati Bengals (2022–2023); Philadelphia Eagles (2024)*; Washington Commanders (2024)*; Pittsburgh Steelers (2024–2025); Washington Commanders (2026)*
- * Offseason or practice squad member only

Awards and highlights
- 3× first-team All-MAC

Career NFL statistics as of 2025
- Games played: 81
- Games started: 33
- Stats at Pro Football Reference

Max Scharping (born August 10, 1996) is an American professional football guard. He played college football for the Northern Illinois Huskies and was selected by the Houston Texans in the second round of the 2019 NFL draft. Scharping has also played for the Cincinnati Bengals, Philadelphia Eagles, Pittsburgh Steelers, and Washington Commanders.

== College career ==
Coming out of Green Bay Southwest High School, Scharping chose Northern Illinois out of approximately ten scholarship offers. He started four years at NIU, mainly playing tackle positions on either side of the offensive line but sometimes playing offensive guard as well. Scharping made First-team All-Mid-American Conference (MAC) his sophomore (2016), junior (2017) and senior (2018) seasons. Analysts noted his strength as a strong suit in college play. Scharping was invited to the 2019 Senior Bowl after his senior season; he only stayed at school to win the MAC championship, a goal which he accomplished.

== Professional career ==
Pre-draft measurables
Height	Weight	Arm length	Hand span	Wingspan	20-yard shuttle	Three-cone drill	Vertical jump	Broad jump	Bench press
6 ft 5 7/8 in (1.98 m)	327 lb (148 kg)	33 5/8 in (0.85 m)	10 in (0.25 m)	6 ft 8 1/8 in (2.04 m)	4.69 s	7.77 s	28.0 in (0.71 m)	9 ft 0 in (2.74 m)	27 reps
All values from NFL Combine

=== Houston Texans ===
Scharping was selected by the Houston Texans in the second round (55th overall) of the 2019 NFL draft. After starting the year as a backup, he was named the starting left guard in Week 3, and started the final 14 games.

Scharping was placed on the reserve/COVID-19 list by the team on October 28, 2020, and activated on November 10. He finished the 2020 season appearing in 15 games and played on 49.57% of the Texans' offensive snaps. On December 27, Scharping recorded seven rushing yards after catching a lateral pass from Brandin Cooks to end the game with a loss to the Cincinnati Bengals. Scharping appeared in all 17 games of the 2021 season, in what would be his final season with the Texans.

On August 30, 2022, Scharping was waived by the Texans.

=== Cincinnati Bengals ===
On August 31, 2022, Scharping was claimed off waivers by the Cincinnati Bengals. He would be named the starting right guard in the team's 2022 playoff games due to starter Alex Cappa suffering an ankle injury in their Week 18 game against the Baltimore Ravens.

On March 20, 2023, Scharping re-signed with the Bengals. He played in just one regular season game for Cincinnati in the team's Week 18 victory over the Cleveland Browns.

=== Philadelphia Eagles ===
On June 3, 2024, Scharping signed with the Philadelphia Eagles. He was released by the Eagles on August 26.

=== Washington Commanders ===
Scharping signed with the Washington Commanders' practice squad on August 28, 2024.

=== Pittsburgh Steelers ===
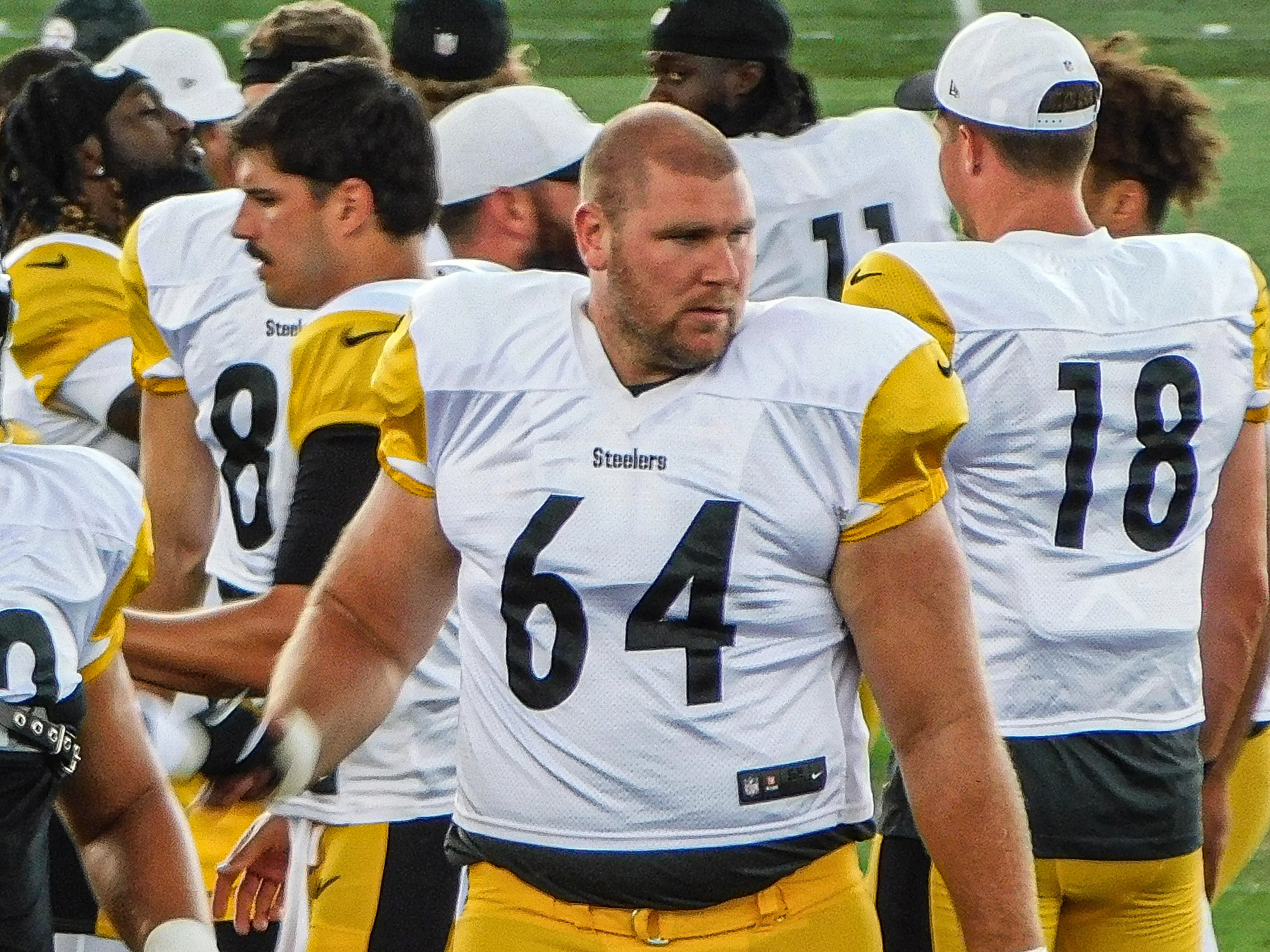
Scharping with the Pittsburgh Steelers in 2025

On October 1, 2024, Scharping was signed by the Pittsburgh Steelers off the Commanders practice squad. He spent much of his initial season with Pittsburgh inactive, only appearing in two games, one exclusively on special teams.

On April 15, 2025, Scharping re-signed with the Steelers on a one-year contract.

=== Washington Commanders (second stint) ===
On August 8, 2026, Scharping signed with the Commanders. On August 30, he was waived by the Commanders as a part of final roster cuts before the start of the regular season.

== Personal life ==
Scharping married his wife, Cassidy Halloran, in 2021. They have three children, born in 2022, 2024, and 2025.
