= American Football Kicking Hall of Fame =

The American Football Kicking Hall of Fame was created in 2008 to recognize individuals who have excelled as kickers, to educate the public on the historic contributions of the kicking game and to promote the advancement of kickers (placekickers or punters) in American football.

The American Football Kicking Hall of Fame features two categories – athletes and contributors. Athletes are individuals who have played football and kicked at an elite level. Contributors can be a coach or any other individual who has greatly contributed to the success of kicking in American football.

Thirty people have been inducted into the American Football Kicking Hall of Fame. Of them, six are also in the Pro Football Hall of Fame, some of whom were inducted into the latter for non-kicking achievements.

The annual induction ceremony is during the Augusta (Ga.) Sports Council's All-Area Football Banquet in January.

== Inductees ==
| Year | Inductees | NFL team(s)/Accomplishments |
|---|---|---|
| 2008 | Lou Groza | Cleveland Browns (1946–59) |
| 2008 | Sammy Baugh | Washington Redskins (1937–52), New York Titans (1960–61), Houston Oilers (1964) |
| 2008 | Jan Stenerud | Kansas City Chiefs (1967–79), Minnesota Vikings (1984–85), Green Bay Packers (1980–83) |
| 2008 | Jim Thorpe | NFL 1920s All-Decade Team, Pro Football Hall of Fame |
| 2008 | George Blanda | Chicago Bears (1949), Baltimore Colts (1950), Houston Oilers (1960–66), Oakland Raiders (1967–75) |
| 2009 | Ray Guy | Oakland Raiders (1973–86), NFL 75th Anniversary All-Time Team, NFL 1970s All-Decade Team |
| 2009 | Pete Gogolak | Buffalo Bills (1964–65), New York Giants (1966–74) |
| 2009 | Ben Agajanian | Philadelphia Eagles (1945), Pittsburgh Steelers (1945), New York Giants (1949, 1954–57), Los Angeles Rams (1953), Green Bay Packers (1961), Oakland Raiders (1962), San Diego Chargers (1964) |
| 2010 | Tom Dempsey | New Orleans Saints (1969–70), Philadelphia Eagles (1971–74), Los Angeles Rams (1975–76), Houston Oilers (1977), Buffalo Bills (1978–79) |
| 2010 | Yale Lary | NFL 1950s All-Decade Team, Detroit Lions |
| 2011 | Doak Walker | Detroit Lions (1950–55), Heisman Trophy (1948), Maxwell Award (1947) |
| 2011 | LeRoy Mills | Instructor |
| 2011 | George Allen | Former NFL coach, Pro Football Hall of Fame |
| 2012 | Kevin Butler | Chicago Bears (1985–95), Arizona Cardinals (1996–97) |
| 2012 | Jerrel Wilson | Kansas City Chiefs (1963–77), New England Patriots (1978) |
| 2013 | Fred Mitchell | Chicago Tribune sports columnist |
| 2013 | Steve O'Neal | New York Jets (1969–72), New Orleans Saints (1973) |
| 2013 | Reggie Roby | Miami Dolphins (1983–92), Washington Redskins (1993–94), Tampa Bay Buccaneers (1995), Houston/Tennessee Oilers (1996–97), San Francisco 49ers (1998) |
| 2014 | Tommy Davis | San Francisco 49ers (1959–69) |
| 2014 | Mark Moseley | Philadelphia Eagles (1970), Houston Oilers (1971–72), Washington Redskins (1974–86), Cleveland Browns (1986) |
| 2015 | Morten Andersen | New Orleans Saints (1982–94), Atlanta Falcons (1995–2000), New York Giants (2001), Kansas City Chiefs (2002–03), Minnesota Vikings (2004), Atlanta Falcons (2006–07) |
| 2015 | Bobby Walden | Edmonton Eskimos (1961–63), Hamilton Tiger-Cats (1963), Minnesota Vikings (1964–67), Pittsburgh Steelers (1968–77) |
| 2016 | Pat O'Dea | Wisconsin–Madison (1898–99), Notre Dame (1900-01) Coach, Missouri (1902) Coach |
| 2017 | Arda Bowser | Canton Bulldogs (1921–22), Cleveland Indians (1923) |
| 2017 | George Gipp | Notre Dame (1917–20) |
| 2018 | Paddy Driscoll | Chicago Tigers (1920-25), Chicago Bears (1926-29) |
| 2018 | Glenn Presnell | Ironton Tanks (1929–30), Detroit Lions (1931–36) |
| 2019 | Nile Kinnick | |
| 2020 | Horace Gillom | Cleveland Browns (1947-56) |
| 2021 | Alex Moffat | |
