= Fred B. Mitchell =

American sports journalist (1948–2026)

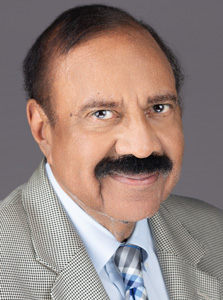
- Born: July 10, 1948; Cincinnati, Ohio, U.S.
- Died: November 17, 2026 (aged 78)
- Education: Wittenberg University (MA)
- Occupation: Journalist
- Years active: 1974–2005
- Notable credit: Chicago Tribune
- Children: 2
- Football career

Profile
- Position: Placekicker

Career information
- College: Wittenberg (1965–1968)

Frederick B. Mitchell (July 10, 1948 – November 17, 2026) was an American sportswriter and columnist (1974–2015) for the Chicago Tribune. He is the author of 12 books and also the namesake of the Fred Mitchell Award, which annually goes to the top placekicker among over 750 non-FBS colleges in America. The award, handed out through the National Football Foundation, is based on kicking performance and community service.

In 2023, Mitchell was inducted into the Chicagoland Sports Hall of Fame and Indiana Football Hall of Fame.

In 2024, Mitchell was honored with the Lifetime Achievement Award from the Chicago Headline Club and inducted into the Gary Sports Hall of Fame; and in 2025 was inducted into the Ohio Sports Hall of Fame, Indiana Sports Hall of Fame, and Indiana Journalism Hall of Fame.

== Football career ==
Mitchell set the NCAA record for most career points scored by kicking while playing for small-college powerhouse Wittenberg University of Springfield, Ohio from 1965 to 1968. Mitchell joined future Pro Football Hall of Fame kicker Jan Stenerud in the "College Division" record book after Stenerud had set the national mark for single-season kick scoring at Montana State in 1966. He was named a member of the 1968 Lutheran College All-America team.

While teaching English and coaching football and track at Grove City High School in Ohio, Mitchell played semi-pro football with the Columbus Bucks and later the Chicago Heights Broncos. He also often wrote about those teams in local newspapers. He was inducted into the American Football Association semi-pro Hall of Fame in 1999. He was also inducted into the Wittenberg Hall of Honor in 1995 and the American Football Kicking Hall of Fame in 2013.

== As a sportswriter ==
Mitchell, who grew up in Gary, Indiana, was hired as the Chicago Tribune's first African-American sportswriter in 1974 and became the beat writer covering the Chicago Bulls, Cubs and Bears. He is the only writer to cover those pro teams as a main beat assignment in the history of the newspaper. He became a columnist in the last 20 years of his career and earned the Ring Lardner Award for outstanding sports journalism in 2015.

He authored books with Pro Football Hall of Famers Gale Sayers and Richard Dent, MLB Hall of Famer Ryne Sandberg and the late Earl Woods, father of PGA champion Tiger Woods.

== Post-Chicago Tribune ==
Following his Chicago Tribune career, Mitchell became an adjunct professor of journalism at Northwestern University and DePaul University, as well as the executive producer for Jordan & Jordan Communications in Chicago. He also served as the community correspondent for the Chicago Blackhawks for three years.

== Personal life and death ==
Mitchell was married to Kim for 25 years. He died from leukemia on November 17, 2026, at the age of 78.
