= Jeff Schebler =

American football player

Jeff Schebler is an American football player who set the NCAA all-time scoring record for a kicker while playing for the Wisconsin–Whitewater Warhawks. Nicknamed the "Golden Boot" on campus, Schebler compiled 470 points from 2006 to 2009.

Schebler attended Assumption High School in Davenport, Iowa. Despite receiving an academic scholarship to Bemidji State University, he decided to attend the University of Wisconsin–Whitewater because of its football facilities and finance program.
