= Shane Morris =

American football player (born 1994)

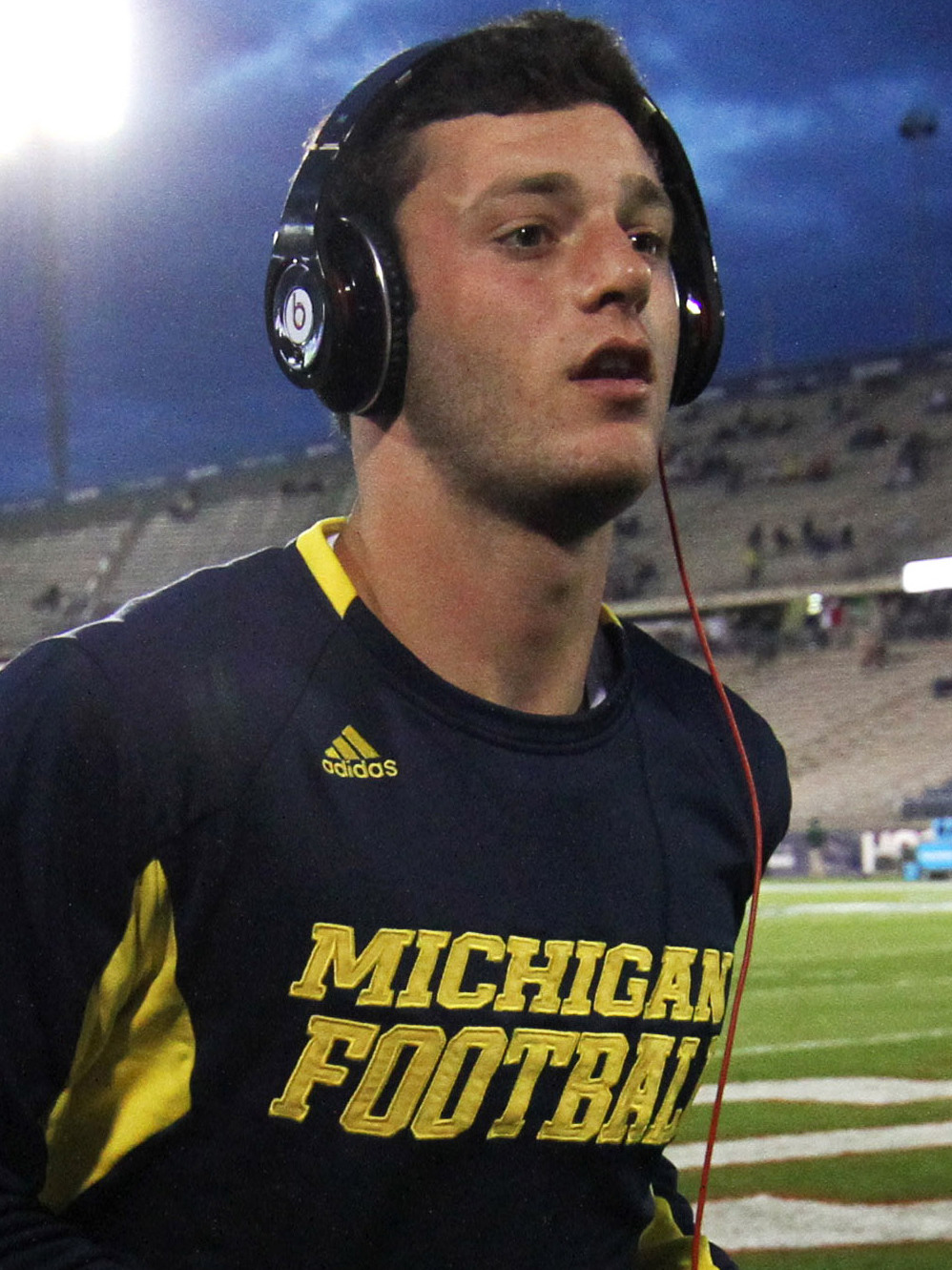
- Morris in 2013

No. 11
- Position: Quarterback

Personal information
- Born: August 4, 1994 (age 32)
- Listed height: 6 ft 3 in (1.91 m)
- Listed weight: 210 lb (95 kg)

Career information
- High school: De La Salle (Warren, Michigan)
- College: Michigan (2013–2016); Central Michigan (2017)
- NFL draft: 2018: undrafted

Career history
- Baltimore Brigade (2019)

Shane Ryan Morris (born August 4, 1994) is an American former football quarterback. He was a highly touted five-star prospect from De La Salle Collegiate High School in Warren, Michigan, until he endured mononucleosis midway through his senior season. He played in the 2013 Under Armour All-America Game.

Morris saw limited action at Michigan as a freshman until starting in the 2013 Buffalo Wild Wings Bowl in place of starter Devin Gardner. During the 2014 season, he started one game and suffered a concussion. He did not appear in any games during the 2015 season. He redshirted during the 2015 season was the third-string quarterback (behind Wilton Speight and John O'Korn) for the 2016 Michigan Wolverines football team. He transferred to Central Michigan for his redshirt senior season.

== Early life ==
Morris was born to Bruce and Jennifer Morris on August 4, 1994. Morris has two younger siblings, Brent and Gracie. Morris, who quarterbacked the all-boys De La Salle Collegiate, led the 2009 freshman team to the Catholic League championship before being called up to finish the season with the varsity team. When the starting quarterback was injured in the fourth quarter of the scoreless district final game against Grosse Pointe South High School, he was put in the game because the backup had a broken thumb. He led the team to victory in that game and 27–6 victory over Southfield High School in the Division 2 Michigan High School Athletic Association (MHSAA) regional playoff game before losing 12–3 to Inkster High School in the state semifinals. This was the second straight year that future teammate Gardner led Inkster to the state championships.

As a sophomore, he totaled 1,152 yards and 14 touchdowns, while helping De La Salle achieve a 9–3 record in 2010. He led the team to the MHSAA Division 2 quarterfinals where they lost to eventual state champion Farmington Hills Harrison 33–23. He began getting scholarship offers starting with Cincinnati, but as a lifelong Michigan fan, he hoped for an offer from Michigan once they abandoned Rich Rodriguez' spread offense and hired head coach Brady Hoke and offensive coordinator Al Borges. Before Michigan made him an offer on March 28, 2011, he also received offers from Bowling Green and Toledo. He gave Michigan a verbal commitment on May 10, 2011. He became Michigan's first commit of the class of 2013 in order to eliminate recruiting distractions. Once he committed, he actively recruited prospects for the team.

He participated as one of the four quarterbacks in the July 2011 Gridiron Kings event at Disney World (with the top 24 quarterbacks participating in the 2011 Elite 11), but he was overshadowed by Matt Davis. As a junior in the fall of 2011, he passed for 1,684 yards and 19 touchdowns. He led the team to the 2011 Division 1 MHSAA state quarterfinals where they lost 9–6 to eventual state champions Cass Technical High School. Prior to his senior season, he was regarded as one of the best quarterback prospects produced by the state of Michigan, a state whose greatest quarterback products have been Gary Danielson, Earl Morrall, Craig Morton and James Ninowski. From the start of ESPN's rankings with the class of 2006 through the class of 2012, no Michigan quarterback ever ranked in the top 100. The closest were Rob Bolden (112th, 2010) and Gardner (128th, 2010). Prior to his senior year, he was ranked as ESPN's 37th best and Rivals.com's 17th best prospect and rising in the national class of 2013. Entering his senior season, he and Max Browne were the only two 5-star rated quarterbacks in the class of 2013 by Rivals.com. A few weeks into his senior season, he had risen to 26th at ESPN, but suffered season-ending mononucleosis with five games remaining on the schedule. By the beginning of November, he was the top quarterback in the country according to some evaluators. He ended his high school career ranked 127th by ESPN and 81st by Rivals.com.

During the summer of 2012, he was at first unable to qualify for the 2012 Elite 11 in his home region, but participated in a second regional contest and was named MVP, earning an invitation. Morris was described as having the strongest arm of the 25 quarterbacks at the Elite 11 finals, although he did not finish in the top 11 of the competition. On September 6, 2012, he was the first quarterback selected to participate in the January 4, 2013 Under Armour All-America Game for high school seniors. As he was attempting to regain momentum following his battle with mononucleosis, he was reported to have been unimpressive in the week of practice and in the game. In the game, he was notable for being the recipient of a vicious tackle by Matthew Thomas, who was the top-ranked outside linebacker in the class of 2013 according to ESPN. The Detroit News named him as the top prospect in the state of Michigan on their 2013 Blue Chip List.

By January 2013, Morris had been so inundated with media requests, that he chose to discontinue any direct media contact (although he was an active social media participant) until he arrived at Michigan. On February 7, 2013, Morris was the first player to commit in writing to Michigan on signing day with a 7:01 a.m submission of his National Letter of Intent.

College recruiting
Name	Hometown	School	Height	Weight	40^{‡}	Commit date
Shane Morris; QB	Warren, Michigan	De La Salle (MI)	6 ft 3 in (1.91 m)	192.5 lb (87.3 kg)	4.63	May 10, 2011
Shane Morris; QB	Recruit ratings: Scout: Rivals: (84)					
Overall recruit ranking: Scout: 40 (national), 4 (QB) Rivals: 81 (national), 4 (QB, pro-style), 2 (MI) ESPN: 127 (national), 8 (QB, pocket passer), 3 (MI)
Note: In many cases, Scout, Rivals, 247Sports, On3, and ESPN may conflict in their listings of height and weight.; In these cases, the average was taken. ESPN grades are on a 100-point scale.; Sources: "Michigan Football Commitments". Rivals.; "2013 Michigan Football Commits". Scout.; "ESPN". ESPN.; "Scout.com Team Recruiting Rankings". Scout.; "2013 Team Ranking". Rivals.com.

== College ==
=== 2013 season ===
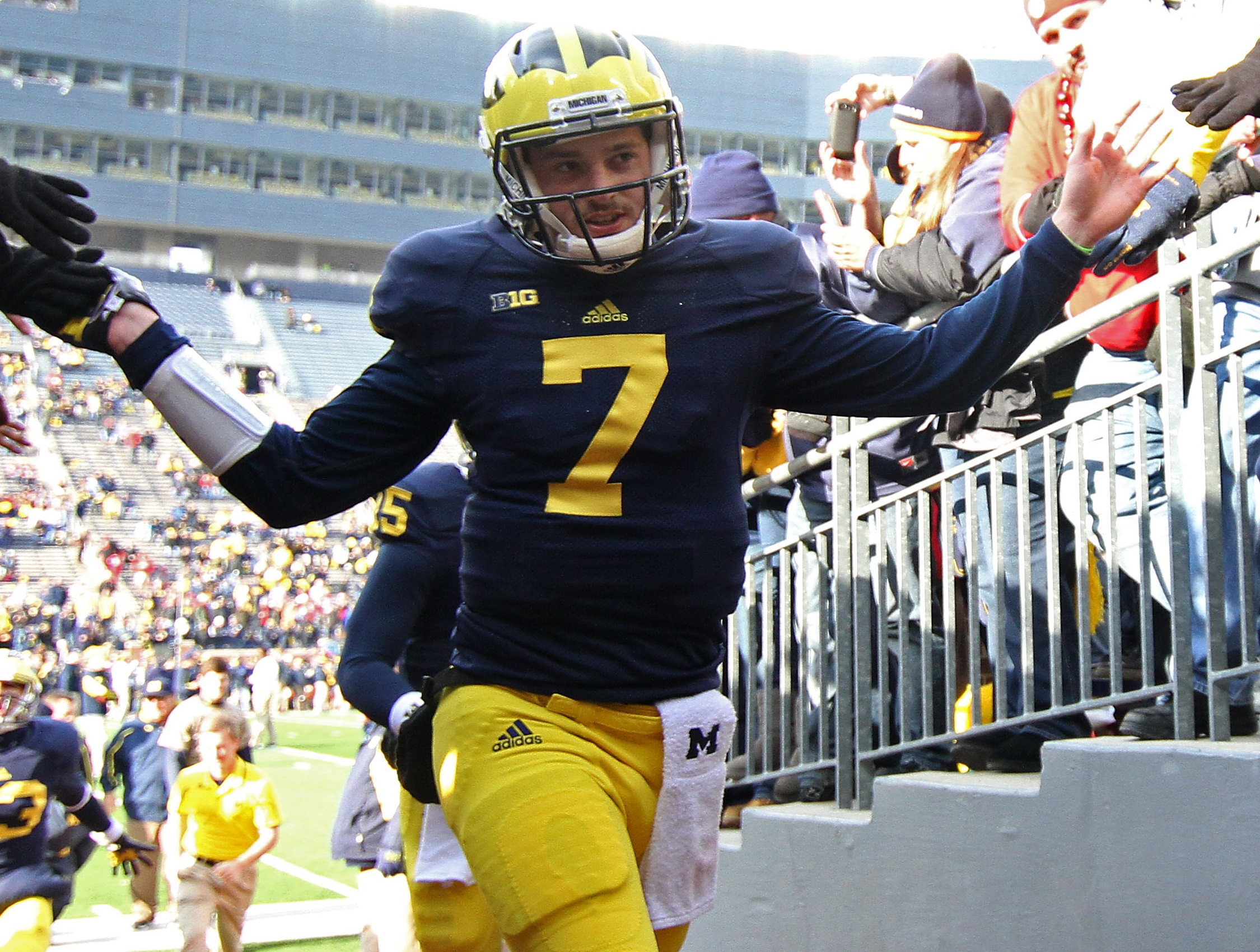
Morris at the 2013 Michigan–Ohio State rivalry game

After Denard Robinson left for the NFL, sophomore Russell Bellomy, the only scholarship quarterback on the roster other than Devin Gardner, endured a season-ending anterior cruciate ligament injury. The injury left the team without a healthy backup who had ever taken an official snap. True freshman Morris competed with redshirt freshman walk-on Brian Cleary for the backup role. On August 22, 2013 as a true freshman, Morris was named backup quarterback to redshirt junior Gardner. He made his debut for the 2013 team in the season opener against Central Michigan. Passing for 59 yards on 4-for-6 passing, he was one of 11 true freshmen to play in the game for Michigan. Morris also played in the Michigan–Michigan State football rivalry on November 2 against the 2013 Michigan State Spartans, completing only one pass (on three attempts) for six yards.

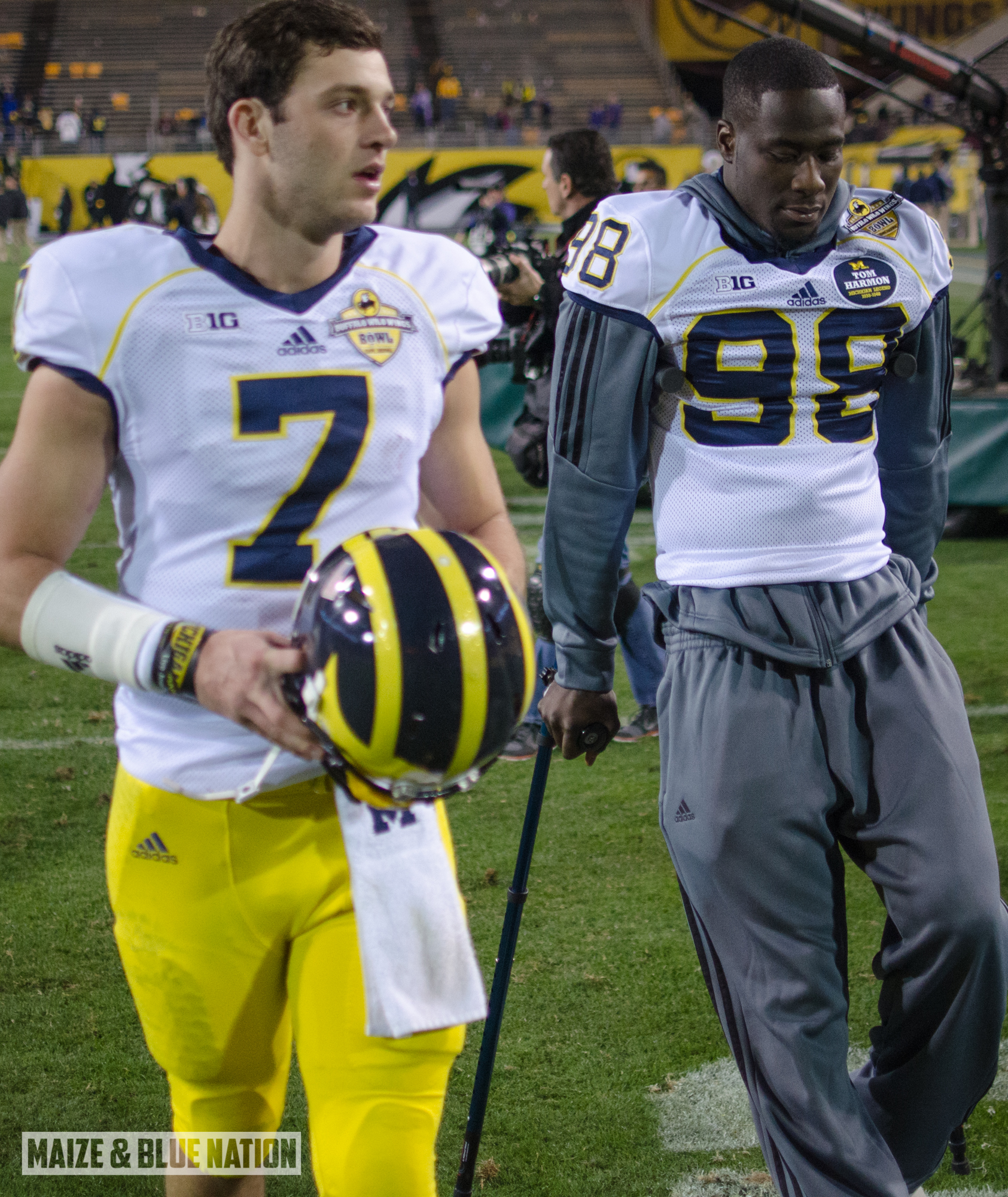
Morris with Devin Gardner at the 2013 Buffalo Wild Wings Bowl, where Morris started due to Gardner's injury

Gardner suffered a turf toe injury prior to the 2013 team's 2013 Buffalo Wild Wings Bowl against Kansas State. With Gardner held out of practices, Morris got extensive work. Morris started in place of Gardner in the Buffalo Wild Wings Bowl, compiling 196 yards on 24–38 passing. Kansas State won the game 31-14.

=== 2014 season ===
After Michigan began the season with a 2–2 record under senior starter Gardner and with head coach Hoke under pressure, Morris started in the September 27 Little Brown Jug rivalry game against Minnesota. Michigan lost the game 30–14, earning its third loss earlier than it had ever done in the 135-year history of Michigan football. The 16-point loss was the largest loss to Minnesota since 1977 and the largest to Minnesota at home since 1962. On September 30, Michigan athletic director Dave Brandon revealed that Morris suffered a concussion during the game but still played after showing signs of a concussion. This revelation sparked calls for Brandon to be fired, including a protest on the Michigan campus. When Gardner was injured in week 7 (October 11) against Penn State, Russell Bellomy and not Morris was the replacement, due to what was presumed to be lingering injuries (high-ankle sprain and/or concussion) to Morris.

=== 2015 season ===
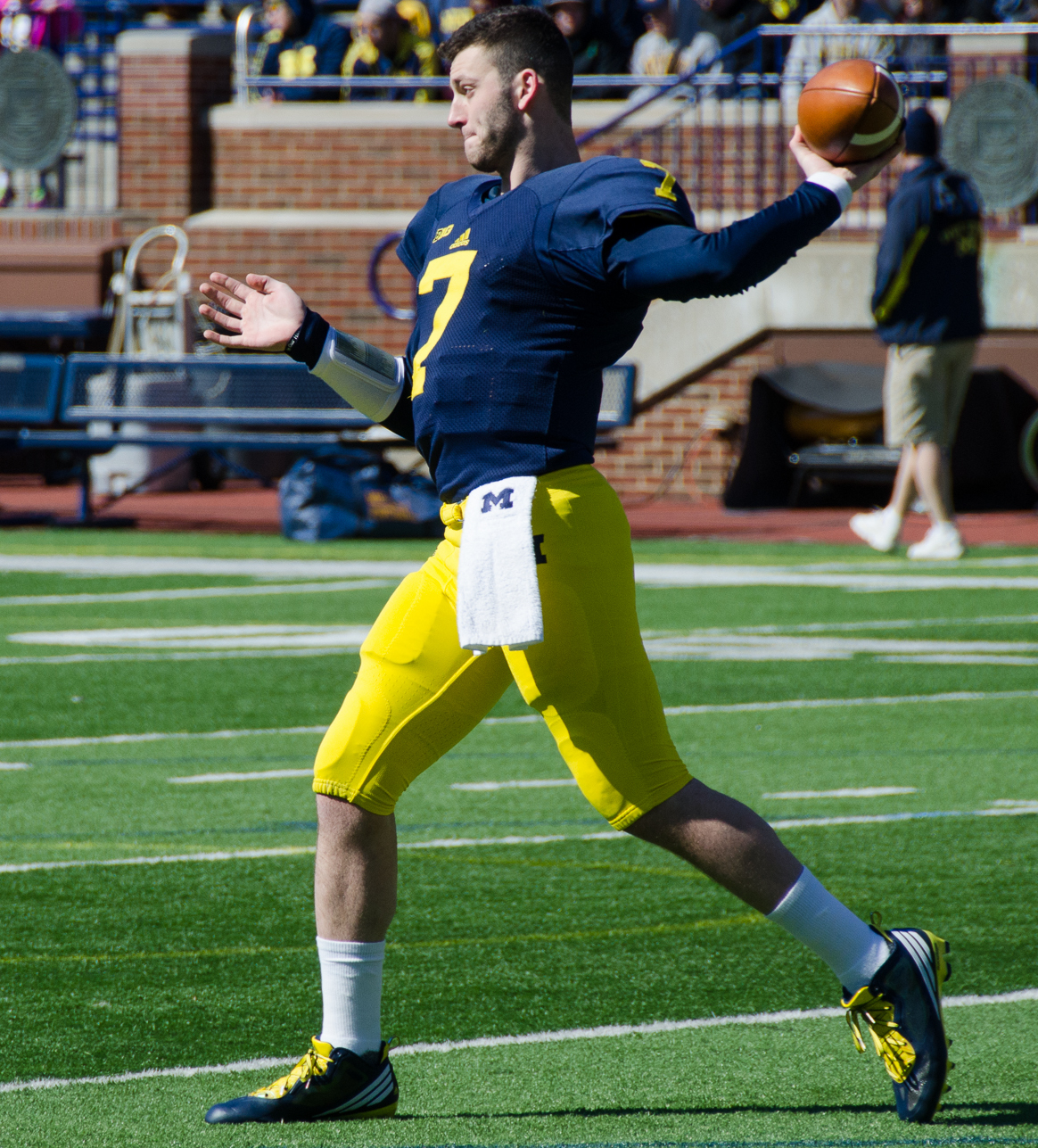
Morris in the spring of 2015

In the final days before the 2015 Michigan Wolverines football team began its season for new head coach Jim Harbaugh against Utah, Morris was in a quarterback battle with incoming graduate student transfer Jake Rudock, who had started the prior two seasons for Iowa. On Monday before the Thursday September 3 game, Harbaugh would not name his starter. Rudock started the game. After the second game, against Oregon State, there was controversy when Wilton Speight took the mopup snaps during the 35–7 victory instead of Morris. Harbaugh explained that since Speight had already used his redshirt season and Morris had not, there was no reason for Morris to lose a season unless it was for meaningful snaps, but that Morris is the #2 quarterback. When Rudock was sidelined in the third quarter with the team trailing in the October 31, 2015, Little Brown Jug rivalry game against Minnesota, Speight engineered the game-winning drive via his first touchdown pass with less than five minutes remaining in the fourth quarter. Harbaugh explained that Speight had earned the backup role in practice in the preceding weeks.

=== 2016 season ===
2016 spring practice began on February 29 with a highly anticipated quarterback battle between Morris, John O'Korn, Speight, true freshman Brandon Peters, and redshirt freshman Alex Malzone. As spring practice wound down in late March, Speight, O'Korn, and Morris seemed to be the leading three, but in that order. O'Korn and Speight were the starters in the April 1 spring game, while Morris lined up at wide receiver early and threw an interception returned for a touchdown as a quarterback.

On September 3 before the opening game against Hawaii, Speight was named as the starting quarterback. Morris entered that game for Michigan in the fourth quarter after Michigan had built a 49–0 lead behind Speight and O'Korn had led the team on a subsequent scoring drive. Morris went 4–4 on Michigan's seventh consecutive touchdown-scoring drive.

=== 2017 season ===
Following the 2016 season, Morris announced that he would be transferring from Michigan for the 2017 football season. On January 21, 2017, he announced he would join the Central Michigan Chippewas. Morris entered the season with an unresolved status following a quarterback battle with redshirt freshman Tony Poljan; both were expected to play in the opener against Rhode Island. Morris ended up playing the majority of the opening triple overtime victory. In week 2, Morris posted 467 yards passing and 5 touchdowns in an upset victory against Kansas. The performance earned Morris recognition as the Mid-American Conference West Division Player of the Week and as one of eight NCAA finalists for the weekly Manning Award for quarterback performances. In the rivalry game against Western Michigan on November 1, Morris helped CMU rally from a 21–7 halftime deficit by throwing a game-tying touchdown with 5:50 remaining and 77-yard deciding touchdown pass with 2:37 remaining. The following week, he threw 3 touchdowns to help CMU clinch the Michigan MAC Trophy with a win over Eastern Michigan. Morris helped CMU finish the regular season with 5 consecutive wins for a total of 8 wins (before the 2017 Famous Idaho Potato Bowl), the most by CMU since the 2009 Chippewas team. The fifth consecutive win was a rally from a 17–0 halftime deficit against Northern Illinois in which Morris threw three touchdowns, including a 29-yard fourth-down pass to with 1:32 remaining.

== Professional career ==
Pre-draft measurables
Height	Weight	Arm length	Hand span	40-yard dash	10-yard split	20-yard split	20-yard shuttle	Three-cone drill	Vertical jump	Broad jump
6 ft 3 in (1.91 m)	206 lb (93 kg)	31 1/4 in (0.79 m)	9 3/4 in (0.25 m)	4.84 s	1.73 s	2.86 s	4.58 s	7.33 s	31.5 in (0.80 m)	9 ft 0 in (2.74 m)
All values from Pro Day

On March 6, 2019, Morris was assigned to the Baltimore Brigade of the Arena Football League (AFL).
