= Cole Tracy =

American football placekicker (born 1996)

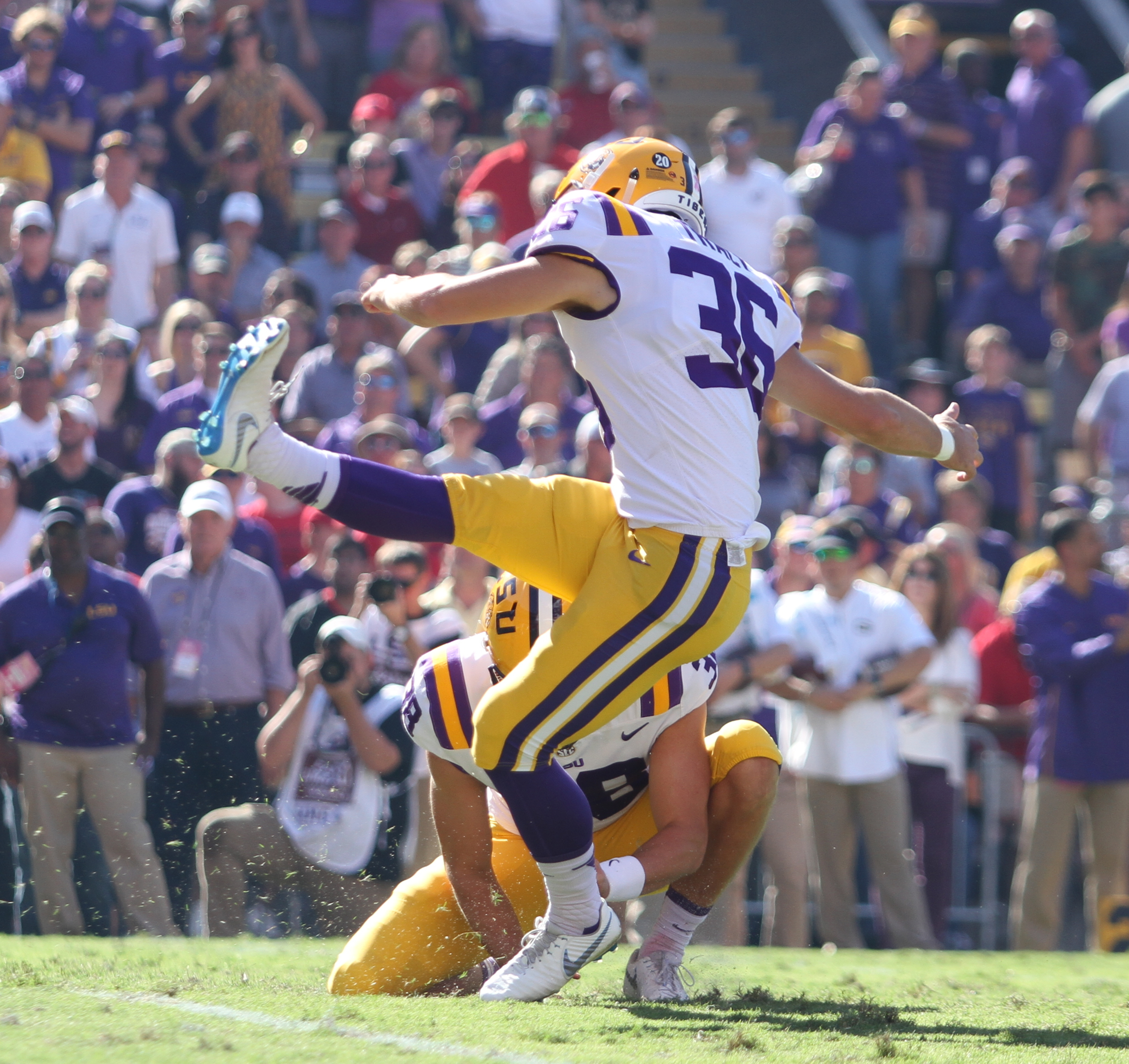
- Tracy with LSU in 2018

No. 3
- Position: Placekicker

Personal information
- Born: May 2, 1996 (age 30); Camarillo, California, U.S.
- Listed height: 5 ft 10 in (1.78 m)
- Listed weight: 184 lb (83 kg)

Career information
- High school: Newbury Park (Newbury Park, California)
- College: Assumption (2014–2017); LSU (2018)
- NFL draft: 2019: undrafted

Career history
- Seattle Dragons (2020)*
- * Offseason or practice squad member only

Awards and highlights
- Fred Mitchell Award (2017); Second-team All-American (2018)
- Stats at Pro Football Reference

Cole Tracy (born May 2, 1996) is an American former football placekicker. He played college football for Assumption and LSU, and was named second-team All-American in 2018.

== Early life and education ==
Tracy was born on May 2, 1996, in Camarillo, California. He attended Newbury Park High School, playing football and soccer, starting three years in football. Following high school Tracy went to Assumption University in Worcester, Massachusetts, redshirting as a true freshman. As a redshirt-freshman the following year, Tracy led Division II kickers with 117 points that included 22 field goals made, 51-of-53 extra-point chances and a season-long field goal of 52 yards. He was 22-for-26 in field goal attempts, earning a second-team All-American award from D2football.com. On September 12, against LIU Post, Tracy went a perfect 6-for-6 on field goal attempts.

As a sophomore, Tracy played in 12 games, making 19 out of 29 field goal attempts, 49 out of 51 extra point attempts, and earning the Steve "Merc" Morris All-Star Special Teams player of the Year award. He tied a Division II record with six made field goals against St. Anselm, becoming one of two players in any division to have two 6+ field goal games. As a junior, he won the Fred Mitchell Outstanding Place Kicker Award, given to the best placekicker below the Division I-FBS level. He was 27-of-29 field goals and made all 67 extra-point attempts to finish with a school record in points scored, with 148.

He transferred to Louisiana State University (LSU) as a senior, and was a finalist for the Lou Groza Award, given to the nation's best placekicker. Tracy was a second-team All-America selection from Sporting News, Walter Camp, Football Writer's Association, and the American Football Coaches Association. He was also first-team All-SEC from both Associated Press and the conference's coaches. He was named player of the week after games against Miami, Auburn, Georgia and Mississippi State. He converted on 29 of 33 field goals and all 42 of his extra point attempts.

Tracy ended his college career as one of the most prolific kickers in NCAA history, making 97 total field goals and scoring 502 total points.

== Professional career ==
Pre-draft measurables
Height	Weight	Arm length	Hand span
5 ft 10 3/8 in (1.79 m)	184 lb (83 kg)	29 3/4 in (0.76 m)	9 1/8 in (0.23 m)
All values from NFL Combine

After his college career Tracy had several tryouts in the National Football League (NFL), including with the New Orleans Saints, Green Bay Packers, and Los Angeles Chargers. He was signed by the Seattle Dragons of the XFL in December 2019, to play in the 2020 season, but was released before the season started.
