= Rico Gafford =

American football player (born 1996)

No. 38, 10
- Positions: Wide receiver, cornerback

Personal information
- Born: May 23, 1996 (age 30); Des Moines, Iowa, U.S.
- Listed height: 5 ft 10 in (1.78 m)
- Listed weight: 184 lb (83 kg)

Career information
- High school: Dowling Catholic (West Des Moines, Iowa)
- College: Iowa Western CC (2014–2015); Wyoming (2016–2017)
- NFL draft: 2018: undrafted

Career history
- Tennessee Titans (2018)*; Oakland / Las Vegas Raiders (2018–2020); Arizona Cardinals (2021)*; Buffalo Bills (2021)*; Denver Broncos (2021); Green Bay Packers (2022)*; Birmingham Stallions (2023)*; BC Lions (2023)*
- * Offseason or practice squad member only

Awards and highlights
- Second-team All-Mountain West (2017)

Career NFL statistics
- Receptions: 2
- Receiving yards: 66
- Receiving touchdowns: 1
- Stats at Pro Football Reference
- Stats at CFL.ca

Marrico Gafford (born May 23, 1996) is an American former professional football player who was a wide receiver and cornerback in the National Football League (NFL). He played college football for the Wyoming Cowboys.

== Early life ==
Gafford was born and grew up in Des Moines, Iowa. He originally attended East High School, where he played football and ran track and was named All-State at cornerback by The Des Moines Register. He transferred to Dowling Catholic High School going into his senior year and was again named All-State. He also competed in the Iowa High School Athletic Association track and field state championships, where he set the state's 100-meter dash record at 10.61 seconds and also won the Class 4A 200 meter dash title.

== College career ==
Gafford began his collegiate career at Iowa Western Community College, where he played two seasons and totaled 77 tackles, five interceptions, and three fumble recoveries before committing to play at Wyoming for his final two seasons of college eligibility over offers from Troy and Ohio. In total, he accumulated 103 total tackles, six interceptions, 17 passes defended, three forced fumbles, and 1.5 tackles for loss over the course of his two seasons with the Cowboys. In his senior season, Gafford made 43 total tackles, a forced fumble, and a tackle for a loss with four interceptions and six pass deflections and was named second-team All-Mountain West Conference. His performance also earned him an invitation to participate in the 2018 NFLPA Collegiate Bowl.

== Professional career ==
Pre-draft measurables
Height	Weight	Arm length	Hand span	40-yard dash	10-yard split	20-yard split	20-yard shuttle	Vertical jump	Broad jump	Bench press
5 ft 9 5/8 in (1.77 m)	184 lb (83 kg)	29 3/4 in (0.76 m)	8 1/2 in (0.22 m)	4.22 s	1.49 s	2.47 s	4.46 s	36.5 in (0.93 m)	10 ft 2 in (3.10 m)	10 reps
All values from Wyoming Pro Day

=== Tennessee Titans ===
Gafford signed with the Tennessee Titans as an undrafted free agent on April 28, 2018. He was cut by the team at the end of training camp on September 1, 2018.

=== Oakland / Las Vegas Raiders ===
Gafford was signed to the Oakland Raiders practice squad on September 3, 2018. While on the practice squad, the Raiders changed Gafford's primary position to wide receiver, in addition to his original cornerback position, due to his speed. He was promoted to the Raiders' active roster on December 18, 2018. Gafford made his NFL debut on December 24, 2018, in a 27-14 win against the Denver Broncos, playing on special teams.

On August 31, 2019, Gafford was waived by the Raiders during final roster cuts but was re-signed to the team's practice squad the next day. He was promoted to the active roster on November 27, 2019. Gafford caught a 49-yard touchdown pass from Derek Carr for his first career reception on December 8, 2019, against the Tennessee Titans. He finished the 2019 season with two catches for 66 yards and a touchdown in four games played.

On November 7, 2020, Gafford was waived by the Raiders and re-signed to the practice squad three days later.

=== Arizona Cardinals ===
Gafford signed a reserve/futures contract with the Arizona Cardinals on January 6, 2021. He was waived on August 23, 2021.

=== Buffalo Bills ===
On August 24, 2021, Gafford was claimed off waivers by the Buffalo Bills. He was waived on August 27.

=== Denver Broncos ===
On September 14, 2021, Gafford was signed to the Denver Broncos practice squad.

=== Green Bay Packers ===
On January 26, 2022, Gafford signed a reserve/future contract with the Green Bay Packers. The Packers moved Gafford back to cornerback after the team drafted three wide receivers in the 2022 NFL draft. He was waived on August 30, and signed to the practice squad the next day. On September 2, he was released from the practice squad.

=== Birmingham Stallions ===
On December 13, 2022 Gafford signed with the Birmingham Stallions of the United States Football League (USFL) and returned to being a wide receiver. He was released on April 10, 2023.

=== BC Lions ===
On September 26, 2023, Gafford signed a practice roster agreement with the BC Lions. He did not dress in a game with the Lions, but was re-signed for the following season on November 22, 2023. He retired on March 25, 2024.
