= Carl Granderson =

American football player (born 1996)

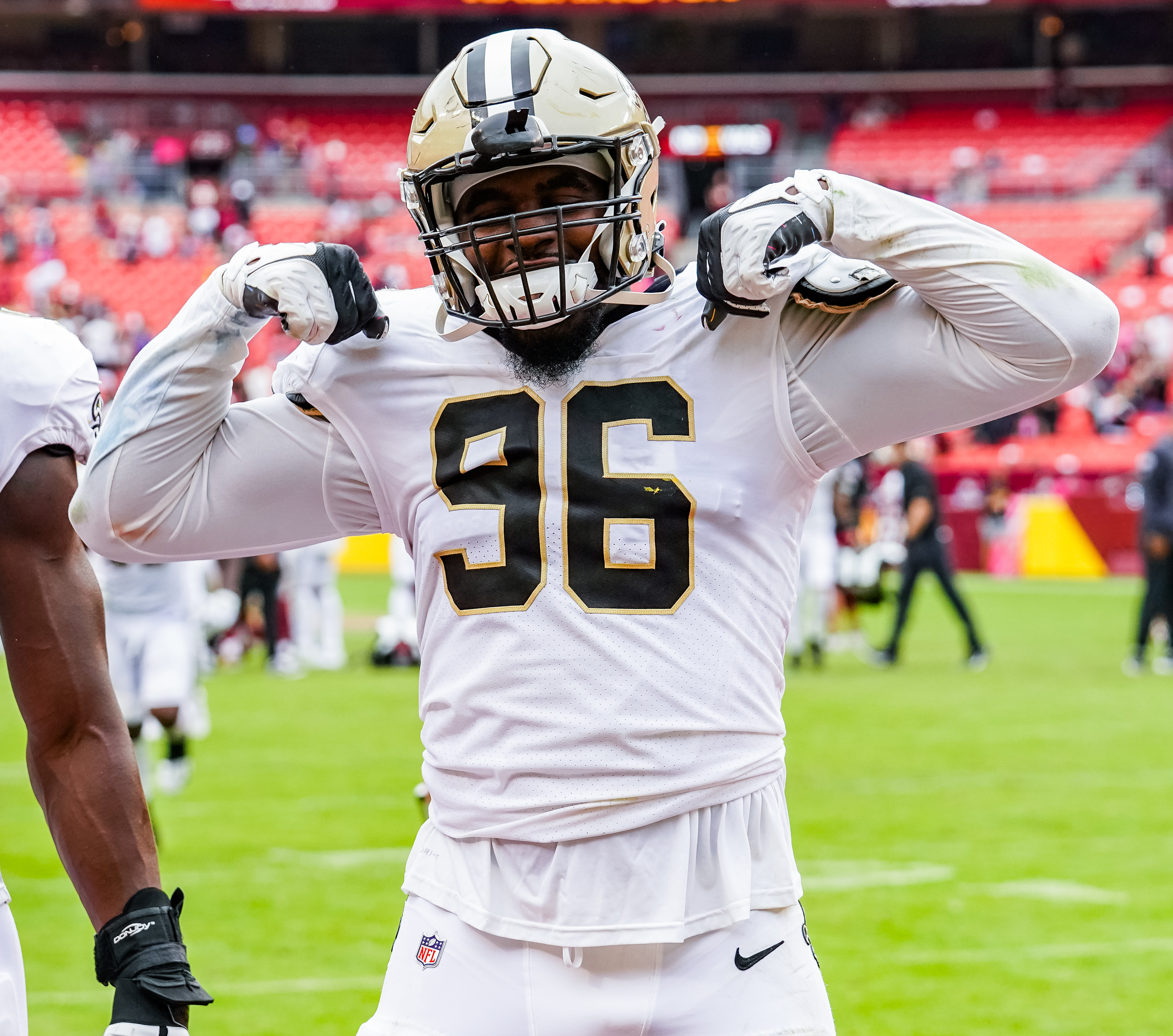
- Granderson with the New Orleans Saints in 2021

No. 96 – New Orleans Saints
- Position: Defensive end
- Roster status: Active

Personal information
- Born: December 18, 1996 (age 29); Sacramento, California, U.S.
- Listed height: 6 ft 5 in (1.96 m)
- Listed weight: 261 lb (118 kg)

Career information
- High school: Grant Union (Sacramento, California)
- College: Wyoming (2015–2018)
- NFL draft: 2019: undrafted

Career history
- New Orleans Saints (2019–present)

Awards and highlights
- First-team All-MWC (2017); Second-team All-MWC (2018)

Career NFL statistics as of Week 18, 2025
- Total tackles: 299
- Sacks: 34.5
- Forced fumbles: 5
- Fumble recoveries: 2
- Pass deflections: 10
- Interceptions: 1
- Stats at Pro Football Reference

Carl Allen Granderson (born December 18, 1996) is an American professional football defensive end for the New Orleans Saints of the National Football League (NFL). After playing college football for the Wyoming Cowboys, he was signed by the Saints as an undrafted free agent in 2019.

== Professional career ==
Pre-draft measurables
Height	Weight	Arm length	Hand span	Wingspan	40-yard dash	10-yard split	20-yard split	20-yard shuttle	Three-cone drill	Vertical jump	Broad jump
6 ft 4 3/4 in (1.95 m)	254 lb (115 kg)	34 in (0.86 m)	9 5/8 in (0.24 m)	6 ft 9 7/8 in (2.08 m)	4.79 s	1.71 s	2.80 s	4.41 s	7.44 s	35.0 in (0.89 m)	9 ft 11 in (3.02 m)
All values from NFL Combine

Granderson signed with the New Orleans Saints as an undrafted free agent following the 2019 NFL draft on May 10, 2019. He received a $15,000 signing bonus and a base salary guarantee of $70,000. Granderson was placed on the reserve/did not report list on July 18, while serving his prison sentence. He was reinstated from the "did not report" list and given a roster exemption on August 31, after his release from jail. Granderson was placed on the active roster on September 16.

On March 10, 2022, Granderson signed a two-year contract extension with the Saints. He played in 16 games with four starts in 2022, recording 53 tackles and 5.5 sacks, good for fourth on the team.

On September 23, 2023, Granderson signed a four-year, $52 million contract extension with the Saints.

In 2025, Granderson transitioned from a full-time starter into a rotational role for New Orleans. He appeared in all 17 of the team's games (including six starts, recording four pass deflections, six sacks, and 57 combined tackles. In the Saints' season finale against the Atlanta Falcons, Granderson recorded his first career interception on a Kirk Cousins pass intended for Kyle Pitts.

== NFL career statistics ==
Legend
**Bold**	Career high

=== Regular season ===
Year	Team	Games		Tackles					Fumbles			Interceptions					
Year	Team	GP	GS	Cmb	Solo	Ast	Sck	TFL	FF	FR	Yds	Int	Yds	Avg	Lng	TD	PD
2019	NO	8	0	11	8	3	1.0	2	0	0	0	–	–	–	–	–	0
2020	NO	15	0	14	11	3	5.0	3	**2**	0	0	–	–	–	–	–	1
2021	NO	15	3	25	11	14	3.0	5	0	0	0	–	–	–	–	–	0
2022	NO	16	4	53	30	23	5.5	9	1	**1**	0	–	–	–	–	–	0
2023	NO	**17**	**17**	**78**	**44**	**34**	**8.5**	**14**	1	**1**	0	–	–	–	–	–	1
2024	NO	**17**	**17**	61	36	25	5.5	9	1	0	0	–	–	–	–	–	**4**
2025	NO	**17**	6	57	35	22	6.0	11	0	0	0	**1**	0	0.0	0	0	**4**
Career		105	47	299	175	124	34.5	53	5	2	0	1	0	0.0	0	0	10

=== Postseason ===
Year	Team	Games		Tackles					Fumbles			Interceptions					
Year	Team	GP	GS	Cmb	Solo	Ast	Sck	TFL	FF	FR	Yds	Int	Yds	Avg	Lng	TD	PD
2019	NO	1	0	0	0	0	0.0	0	0	0	0	0	0	0.0	0	0	0
2020	NO	**2**	0	0	0	0	0.0	0	0	0	0	0	0	0.0	0	0	0
Career		3	0	0	0	0	0.0	0	0	0	0	0	0	0.0	0	0	0

== Personal life ==
Granderson was sentenced to six months in prison on July 11, 2019, after pleading no contest to sexual battery and unlawful contact from an incident in 2018 involving two women. After 43 days in jail, on August 26, a judge suspended his jail sentence and sentenced him to one year of supervised probation instead.
