= 2016 Wyoming Cowboys football team =

American college football season

2016 Wyoming Cowboys football

MW Mountain Division champion

MW Championship Game, L 24–27 vs. San Diego State

Poinsettia Bowl, L 21–24 vs. BYU
- Conference: Mountain West Conference
- Mountain Division
- Record: 8–6 (6–2 MW)
- Head coach: Craig Bohl (3rd season)
- Offensive coordinator: Brent Vigen (3rd season)
- Offensive scheme: Pro-style
- Defensive coordinator: Steve Stanard (3rd season)
- Base defense: 4–3
- Home stadium: War Memorial Stadium

2016 Mountain West Conference football standings
	Conf.			Overall
Team	W		L	W		L
Mountain Division
Wyoming xy	6	–	2	8	–	6
Boise State x	6	–	2	10	–	3
New Mexico x	6	–	2	9	–	4
Air Force	5	–	3	10	–	3
Colorado State	5	–	3	7	–	6
Utah State	1	–	7	3	–	9
West Division
No. 25 San Diego State xy$	6	–	2	11	–	3
Hawaii	4	–	4	7	–	7
Nevada	3	–	5	5	–	7
San Jose State	3	–	5	4	–	8
UNLV	3	–	5	4	–	8
Fresno State	0	–	8	1	–	11
Championship: San Diego State 27, Wyoming 24
$ – Conference champion; x – Division champion/co-champions; y – Championship game participant; Rankings from AP Poll

The 2016 Wyoming Cowboys football team represented the University of Wyoming as a member Mountain West Conference (MW) during the 2016 NCAA Division I FBS football season. Led by third-year head coach Craig Bohl, the Cowboys compiled an overall record of 8–6 record with mark 6–2 in conference play, sharing the MW's Mountain Division title with Boise State and New Mexico. Based on tiebreakers, Wyoming advanced to the Mountain West Championship Game, which the Cowboys hosted, but lost to San Diego State. Wyoming was then invited to the Poinsettia Bowl, where the Cowboys were defeated by BYU. The team played home games at War Memorial Stadium in Laramie, Wyoming.

== Schedule ==
Date	Time	Opponent	Site	TV	Result	Attendance
September 3	8:30 p.m.	Northern Illinois*	War Memorial Stadium; Laramie, WY	CBSSN	W 40–34 ^{3OT}	18,483
September 10	10:00 a.m.	at Nebraska*	Memorial Stadium; Lincoln, NE	ESPN2	L 17–52	89,895
September 17	2:00 p.m.	UC Davis*	War Memorial Stadium; Laramie, WY	MW Net	W 45–22	18,781
September 23	5:30 p.m.	at Eastern Michigan*	Rynearson Stadium; Ypsilanti, MI	CBSSN	L 24–27	17,012
October 1	8:15 p.m.	at Colorado State	Hughes Stadium; Fort Collins, CO (Border War)	ESPNU	W 38–17	33,500
October 8	1:30 p.m.	Air Force	War Memorial Stadium; Laramie, WY	RSRM	W 35–26	28,623
October 22	8:30 p.m.	at Nevada	Mackay Stadium; Reno, NV	ESPN2	W 42–34	18,877
October 29	5:00 p.m.	No. 13 Boise State	War Memorial Stadium; Laramie, WY	CBSSN	W 30–28	26,023
November 5	8:15 p.m.	Utah State	War Memorial Stadium; Laramie, WY (rivalry)	ESPN2	W 52–28	17,837
November 12	1:30 p.m.	at UNLV	Sam Boyd Stadium; Whitney, NV	RSRM	L 66–69 ^{3OT}	14,790
November 19	1:30 p.m.	No. 24 San Diego State	War Memorial Stadium; Laramie, WY	CBSSN	W 34–33	19,112
November 26	8:15 p.m.	at New Mexico	University Stadium; Albuquerque, NM	ESPN2	L 35–56	16,698
December 3	5:45 p.m.	San Diego State	War Memorial Stadium; Laramie, WY (MW Championship Game)	ESPN	L 24–27	26,001
December 21	7:00 p.m.	vs. BYU*	Qualcomm Stadium; San Diego, CA (Poinsettia Bowl)	ESPN	L 21–24	28,114
*Non-conference game; Rankings from AP Poll released prior to the game; All times are in Mountain time

== Preseason ==
At Mountain West media days, the Cowboys were picked to finish last in the Mountain Division. Additionally, three players were named to the pre–season all–conference team: junior running back Brian Hill, senior offensive lineman Chase Roullier, and sophomore free safety Andrew Wingard. Hill was also named to the watchlists for the Maxwell Award and the Doak Walker Award, Roullier was named to the watchlists for the Outland Trophy and the Lombardi Award, Wingard was named to the watchlist for the Jim Thorpe Award, and senior punter Ethan Wood was named to the watchlist for the Ray Guy Award.

== Game summaries ==
=== Northern Illinois ===
	1	2	3	4	OT	2OT	3OT	Total
Huskies	7	6	7	7	0	7	0	34
Cowboys	3	10	14	0	0	7	6	40

- Passing leaders: Josh Allen (UW): 19–29, 245 YDS, 2 TD; Drew Hare (NIU): 24–39, 329 YDS, 3 TD
- Rushing leaders: Brian Hill (UW): 33 CAR, 125 YDS, 2 TD; Kenny Golladay (NIU): 6 CAR, 82 YDS, 1 TD
- Receiving leaders: Jake Maulhardt (UW): 5 REC, 106 YDS; Kenny Golladay (NIU): 10 REC, 144 YDS, 2 TD

=== At Nebraska ===
	1	2	3	4	Total
Cowboys	0	7	10	0	17
Cornhuskers	7	10	7	28	52

- Passing leaders: Josh Allen (UW): 16–32, 189 YDS, 1 TD; Tommy Armstrong Jr. (NEB): 20–34, 377 YDS, 3 TD
- Rushing leaders: Austin Conway (UW): 3 CAR, 70 YDS; Devine Ozigbo (NEB): 15 CAR, 44 YDS, 1 TD
- Receiving leaders: Tanner Gentry (UW): 7 REC, 124 YDS, 1 TD; Alonzo Moore (NEB): 3 REC, 109 YDS, 1 TD

=== UC Davis ===
	1	2	3	4	Total
Aggies	3	6	6	7	22
Cowboys	14	21	10	0	45

- Passing leaders: Josh Allen (UW): 11–15, 198 YDS, 3 TD; Ben Scott (UCD): 18–31, 178 YDS, 1 TD, 1 INT
- Rushing leaders: Brian Hill (UW): 25 CAR, 207 YDS, 2 TD; Joshua Kelley (UCD): 7 CAR, 46 YDS
- Receiving leaders: C.J. Johnson (UW): 3 REC, 67 YDS, 1 TD; Keelan Doss (UCD): 7 REC, 104 YDS, 1 TD

=== At Eastern Michigan ===
	1	2	3	4	Total
Cowboys	10	7	0	7	24
Eagles	3	14	3	7	27

- Passing leaders: Josh Allen (UW): 19–29, 234 YDS, 1 INT; Todd Porter (EMU): 14–28, 214 YDS, 1 TD, 4 INT
- Rushing leaders: Brian Hill (UW): 22 CAR, 82 YDS, 1 TD; Ian Eriksen (EMU): 27 CAR, 120 YDS, 1 TD
- Receiving leaders: Tanner Gentry (UW): 12 REC, 127 YDS; Nigel Kilby (EMU): 4 REC, 84 YDS

=== At Colorado State ===
	1	2	3	4	Total
Cowboys	3	21	14	0	38
Rams	7	10	0	0	17

- Passing leaders: Josh Allen (UW): 7–18, 165 YDS, 1 TD; Collin Hill (CSU): 23–41, 370 YDS, 1 TD, 1 INT
- Rushing leaders: Brian Hill (UW): 19 CAR, 166 YDS, 1 TD; Izzy Matthews (CSU): 5 CAR, 38 YDS
- Receiving leaders: Tanner Gentry (UW): 3 REC, 91 YDS, 1 TD; Michael Gallup (CSU): 4 REC, 75 YDS

=== Air Force ===
	1	2	3	4	Total
Falcons	0	6	7	13	26
Cowboys	7	7	14	7	35

- Passing leaders: Josh Allen (UW): 15–27, 173 YDS, 3 TD; Nate Romine (AF): 6–19, 188 YDS, 2 TD, 3 INT
- Rushing leaders: Brian Hill (UW): 29 CAR, 92 YDS, 1 TD; D.J. Johnson (AF): 7 CAR, 73 YDS
- Receiving leaders: Jake Maulhardt (UW): 3 REC, 42 YDS, 1 TD; Jalen Robinette (AF): 3 REC, 101 YDS, 1 TD

=== At Nevada ===
	1	2	3	4	Total
Cowboys	7	14	14	7	42
Wolf Pack	0	13	14	7	34

- Passing leaders: Josh Allen (UW): 8–12, 135 YDS; Ty Gangi (NEV): 27–43, 300 YDS, 1 TD, 1 INT
- Rushing leaders: Brian Hill (UW): 29 CAR, 289 YDS, 3 TD; James Butler (NEV): 14 CAR, 73 YDS, 2 TD
- Receiving leaders: Tanner Gentry (UW): 4 REC, 109 YDS; Wyatt Demps (NEV): 8 REC, 97 YDS

=== Boise State ===
	1	2	3	4	Total
#13 Broncos	7	14	0	7	28
Cowboys	0	17	0	13	30

- Passing leaders: Josh Allen (UW): 18–31, 274 YDS, 3 TD, 1 INT; Brett Rypien (BSU): 22–35, 295 YDS, 1 INT
- Rushing leaders: Brian Hill (UW): 28 CAR, 146 YDS; Jeremy McNichols (BSU): 18 CAR, 143 YDS, 2 TD
- Receiving leaders: Jacob Hollister (UW): 6 REC, 144 YDS, 2 TD; Cedrick Wilson Jr. (BSU): 4 REC, 84 YDS

=== Utah State ===
	1	2	3	4	Total
Aggies	0	7	21	0	28
Cowboys	14	21	7	10	52

- Passing leaders: Josh Allen (UW): 16–26, 261 YDS, 4 TD, 1 INT; Kent Meyers (USU): 17–29, 235 YDS, 1 TD
- Rushing leaders: Brian Hill (UW): 25 CAR, 142 YDS, 2 TD; Tonny Lindsey (USU): 5 CAR, 75 YDS
- Receiving leaders: Tanner Gentry (UW): 4 REC, 93 YDS, 2 TD; Ron'Quavion Tarver (USU): 8 REC, 104 YDS

=== At UNLV ===
	1	2	3	4	OT	2OT	3OT	Total
Cowboys	3	21	7	21	7	7	0	66
Rebels	10	20	7	15	7	7	3	69

- Passing leaders: Josh Allen (UW): 14–31, 334 YDS, 4 TD, 2 INT; Kurt Palandech (UNLV): 20–32, 252 YDS, 3 TD
- Rushing leaders: Brian Hill (UW): 23 CAR, 119 YDS, 3 TD; Kurt Palandech (UNLV): 16 CAR, 157 YDS, 1 TD
- Receiving leaders: Tanner Gentry (UW): 5 REC, 184 YDS, 3 TD; Devonte Boyd (UNLV): 10 REC, 127 YDS

=== San Diego State ===
	1	2	3	4	Total
#24 Aztecs	7	10	7	9	33
Cowboys	3	7	10	14	34

- Passing leaders: Josh Allen (UW): 16–31, 282 YDS, 2 TD, 1 INT; Christian Chapman (SDSU): 15–26, 211 YDS, 2 TD
- Rushing leaders: Brian Hill (UW): 31 CAR, 131 YDS, 2 TD; Rashaad Penny (SDSU): 5 CAR, 79 YDS
- Receiving leaders: C.J. Johnson (UW): 5 REC, 85 YDS, 1 TD; Donnel Pumphrey (SDSU): 5 REC, 52 YDS

=== At New Mexico ===
	1	2	3	4	Total
Cowboys	0	7	14	14	35
Lobos	21	14	7	14	56

- Passing leaders: Josh Allen (UW): 18–28, 248 YDS; Lamar Jordan (UNM): 4–5, 122 YDS, 1 TD
- Rushing leaders: Brian Hill (UW): 26 CAR, 126 YDS, 3 TD; Teriyon Gipson (UNM): 13 CAR, 217 YDS, 2 TD
- Receiving leaders: Tanner Gentry (UW): 5 REC, 112 YDS; Richard McQuarley (UNM): 2 REC, 58 YDS

=== San Diego State—Mountain West Championship Game ===
	1	2	3	4	Total
Aztecs	7	3	14	3	27
Cowboys	10	0	0	14	24

- Passing leaders: Josh Allen (UW): 14–31, 248 YDS, 3 TD, 2 INT; Christian Chapman (SDSU): 6–13, 85 YDS, 1 INT
- Rushing leaders: Brian Hill (UW): 16 CAR, 93 YDS; Rashaad Penny (SDSU): 16 CAR, 117 YDS, 2 TD
- Receiving leaders: Tanner Gentry (UW): 3 REC, 81 YDS, 1 TD; Mikah Holder (SDSU): 2 REC, 56 YDS

=== BYU—Poinsettia Bowl ===
	1	2	3	4	Total
Cougars	7	3	7	7	24
Cowboys	0	0	7	14	21

- Passing leaders: Josh Allen (UW): 17–32, 207 YDS, 2 TD, 2 INT; Tanner Mangum (BYU): 8–15, 96 YDS, 1 TD, 1 INT
- Rushing leaders: Brian Hill (UW): 23 CAR, 93 YDS, 1 TD; Jamaal Williams (BYU): 26 CAR, 210 YDS, 1 TD
- Receiving leaders: Tanner Gentry (UW): 7 REC, 113 YDS, 2 TD; Nick Kurtz (BYU): 3 REC, 59 YDS

== Personnel ==
=== Coaching staff ===
Name	Position	Seasons at Wyoming	Alma mater	Before Wyoming
Craig Bohl	Head coach	3	Nebraska (1982)	North Dakota State – Head coach (2013)
Steve Stanard	Defensive coordinator / Linebackers	3	Nebraska (1989)	North Dakota State – Linebackers (2013)
Brent Vigen	Offensive coordinator / quarterbacks	3	North Dakota State (1998)	North Dakota State – Offensive coordinator / quarterbacks (2013)
Mike Bath	Running Backs / Fullbacks	3	Miami, Ohio (2001)	Miami, Ohio – Interim Head Coach / offensive coordinator (2013)
AJ Cooper	Special teams coordinator / Defensive Ends	3	North Dakota State (2006)	North Dakota State – Defensive ends / Co-Special Teams (2013)
Scott Fuchs	Offensive line	3	North Dakota State (1995)	North Dakota State (2013)
Mike Grant	Wide receivers	1	Nebraska (1993)	North Texas – Wide receivers / receiving coordinator (2015)
Pete Kaligis	Defensive tackles / Nose Tackles	8	Washington (1994)	Montana – Offensive line (2008)
Curt Mallory	Defensive pass game coordinator / Secondary	2	Michigan (1992)	Michigan – Secondary (2014)
John Richardson	Cornerbacks	3	North Dakota State (2010)	North Dakota State – Cornerbacks (2013)
Russell Dennison	Director of Sports Performance / Head Strength and Conditioning Coach	1	Oklahoma (2006)	Oklahoma – Assistant Strength and Conditioning Coach
Gordie Haug	Director of Recruiting	3	Bemidji State (2009)	North Dakota State – Running backs (2013)
Josh Firm	Offensive Graduate Assistant	2	Missouri S&T (2013)	Bron-Villeurbanne Falcons – Offensive coordinator (2014)
Grant Olson	Defensive Graduate Assistant	2	North Dakota State (2014)	North Dakota State – Student assistant (2014)
Blake Andersen	Defensive Graduate Assistant	1	University of Sioux Falls (2011)	Northwest Missouri State – Defensive Graduate Assistant (2015)
Jacob Claborn	Offensive Graduate Assistant / tight ends	1	California Lutheran (2009)	Central Washington – Offensive line (2015)

=== Roster ===
2016 Wyoming Cowboys Football
Quarterback: 9 Isaac Leppke – freshman (6'4", 173); 11 Chandler Garrett – freshman (6'5", 213); 15 Nick Smith – (redshirt) sophomore (6'4", 229); 17 Josh Allen (C) – (redshirt) sophomore (6'5", 222); 18 Nick Szpor – freshman (6'3", 202); Tailback: 5 Brian Hill – junior (6'1", 219); 16 Milo Hall – (redshirt) freshman (5'8", 190); 21 Shaun Wick – (redshirt) senior (5'10", 210); 22 Nico Evans – (redshirt) sophomore (5'9", 206); 23 Mike Green II – freshman (5'11", 205); 28 Garrett Gardner – (redshirt) freshman (6'0", 205); 29 Kellen Overstreet – sophomore (5'11", 196); 32 Paul Lomanto – freshman (6'1", 200); Fullback: 35 Zach Taylor – freshman (5'11", 214); 36 Drew Van Maanen – (redshirt) junior (6'1", 241); 47 Matt List – (redshirt) sophomore (5'11", 240); 48 Jordan Ellis – senior (6'2", 250); Wide receiver: 3 Joseph Parker – sophomore (5'10", 185); 4 Tanner Gentry – senior (6'2", 210); 12 Dontae Crow – freshman (5'9", 170); 13 John Okwoli – freshman (6'2", 205); 14 C.J. Johnson – (redshirt) freshman (6'2", 196); 19 Ayden Eberhardt – freshman (6'2"); 24 Jerard Swan – freshman (6'0", 186); 25 Austin Conway – (redshirt) freshman (5'10", 172); 26 Nick Wilson – freshman (5'11", 168); 31 Isaac Jefferson – (redshirt) freshman (5'8", 163); 80 James Price – sophomore (6'2", 208); 83 Jake Maulhardt – (redshirt) senior (6'6", 230); 89 Parker Dumas – freshman (6'5", 200); Tight end: 33 Josh Harshman – sophomore (6'3", 226); 81 Austin Fort – (redshirt) sophomore (6'4", 231); 82 Alec Stewart – freshman (6'4", 223); 84 Grant Lewis – (redshirt) sophomore (6'5", 235); 85 Tyree Mayfield – (redshirt) sophomore (6'3", 237); 87 Sam Maughan – freshman (6'3", 220); 88 Jacob Hollister (C) – senior (6'4", 239)	Offensive lineman: 55 Gavin Rush – freshman (6'3", 301); 59 Ryan Cummings – junior (6'6", 319); 60 Du'Ryan Ebbesen – (redshirt) senior (6'2", 309); 61 Kaden Jackson– sophomore (6'2", 294); 62 Eli Moody – senior (6'3", 281); 63 Dustin Weeks – freshman (6'8", 288); 64 Charlie Renfree – (redshirt) junior (6'3", 281); 65 Boyd Draeger – (redshirt) freshman (6'4", 296); 66 Laitham Johnson – freshman (6'5", 243); 67 Cole Turner – (redshirt) sophomore (6'4", 280); 68 Chris Steffey – freshman (6'5", 293); 69 Richard Bettencourt – (redshirt) sophomore (6'3", 310); 71 Jace Webb – freshman (6'4", 321); 72 Zach Wallace – sophomore (6'7", 297); 73 Chase Roullier (C) – (redshirt) senior (6'4", 313); 74 Brinkley Jolly – (redshirt) sophomore (6'5", 273); 75 Kurtis Stirneman – (redshirt) junior (6'5", 296); 77 Pahl Schwab – (redshirt) freshman (6'5", 306); Defensive lineman: 29 Garrett Crall – freshman (6'5", 221); 34 Jaret Falkowski – freshman (6'3", 243); 42 Kevin Prosser – sophomore (6'2", 215); 51 Trevor Meader – (redshirt) senior (6'4", 239); 53 Josiah Hall – (redshirt) freshman (6'1", 237); 57 Chase Appleby – (redshirt) senior (6'0", 268); 58 Taniela Lolohea – junior (6'1", 253); 60 Kendall Dickson – freshman (6'4", 229); 76 Darius Baker – junior (6'3", 289); 78 Shane Henderson – freshman (6'0", 317); 86 Adam Kinder – (redshirt) senior (6'2", 252); 87 Conner Cain – (redshirt) sophomore (6'4", 279); 90 Mark Hall – junior (6'2", 248); 91 Carl Granderson – sophomore (6'5", 243); 92 Shiloh Windsor – freshman (6'3", 224); 93 Youhanna Ghaifan – (redshirt) freshman (6'4", 290); 95 Hunter Van Emmerik – junior (6'4", 281); 96 Sidney Malauulu – (redshirt) sophomore (6'3", 301); 97 Ja'Chai Baker – freshman (6'6", 283); 98 Dalton Fields – (redshirt) junior (6'3", 284); 99 Brent Gilliland – (redshirt) freshman (6'2", 274)	Linebacker: 7 D.J. May – (redshirt) senior (5'11", 216); 11 Eric Nzeocha – (redshirt) senior (6'3", 231); 12 Christian Irving – sophomore (5'11", 208); 15 Jaylon Watson – (redshirt) freshman (6'0", 239); 23 Tim Kamana – (redshirt) junior (5'11", 213); 30 Logan Wilson – (redshirt) freshman (6'2", 225); 32 Adam Pilapil – (redshirt) sophomore (6'1", 211); 43 Ben Wisdorf – (redshirt) freshman (6'1", 213); 44 Devin McKenna – (redshirt) senior (6'2", 228); 45 Lucas Wacha (C) – (redshirt) senior (6'1", 230); 46 Cassh Maluia – freshman (6'0", 223); 47 Drew Harvey – freshman (6'0", 234); 50 Adrian King – freshman (6'1", 220); 52 Jahmari Morre – freshman (6'2", 219); 54 Austin Lopez – (redshirt) freshman (6'3", 223); Defensive back: 2 Robert Priester – junior (5'9", 180); 3 Alijah Halliburton – freshman (6'2", 180); 5 Rico Gafford – junior (5'11", 180); 6 Marcus Epps (C) – (redshirt) sophomore (6'0", 203); 8 Jalen Ortiz – (redshirt) junior (5'10", 196); 9 Tyler Hall – freshman (5'10", 184); 13 Ethan Patrick – junior (6'0", 191); 16 Riley Sessions – freshman (5'11", 193); 17 Deandre Watson – (redshirt) freshman (5'11", 187); 19 Anthony Makransky – (redshirt) sophomore (5'10", 184); 20 Josh Boyd (I) – freshman (6'2", 175); 21 Antonio Hull – sophomore (5'10", 188); 22 Sidney Washington Jr. – freshman (5'9", 164); 24 Braden Smith – freshman (5'10", 177); 27 Davion Freeman – (redshirt) freshman (5'9", 169); 28 Andrew Wingard – sophomore (6'0", 207); 31 Chavez Pownell Jr. – (redshirt) sophomore (5'11", 198); Placekicker: 39 Justin Martin – (redshirt) senior (5'10", 187); 40 Cooper Rothe – freshman (5'11", 170); Punter: 41 Ethan Wood – senior (6'3", 176); Long snapper: 94 Brendan Turelli – senior (6'2", 230)

=== 2016 recruiting class ===
Prior to National Signing Day, Wyoming signed cornerback Rico Gafford from Iowa Western Community College on December 16, 2015. On National Signing Day, Wyoming signed 22 high school players to National Letters of Intent. On March 1, 2016, the Cowboys announced the signing of defensive end Taniela Lolohea from El Camino College, making him the 24th member of the 2016 recruiting class. With the signing of defensive tackle Hunter Van Emmerik from College of the Redwoods, the 2016 recruiting class was complete.

College recruiting
Name	Hometown	School	Height	Weight	40^{‡}	Commit date
John Okwoli #196 WR	Phoenix, AZ	North Canyon HS	6 ft 2 in (1.88 m)	194 lb (88 kg)	4.60	Jan 31, 2016
John Okwoli #196 WR	Recruit ratings: Scout: Rivals: 247Sports: ESPN:					
Cooper Rothe #42 K	Longmont, CO	Longmont HS	6 ft 0 in (1.83 m)	170 lb (77 kg)	–	Oct 6, 2015
Cooper Rothe #42 K	Recruit ratings: Scout: Rivals: 247Sports: ESPN:					
Chandler Garrett #55 QB	Yukon, OK	Mustang HS	6 ft 5 in (1.96 m)	205 lb (93 kg)	–	Jun 14, 2015
Chandler Garrett #55 QB	Recruit ratings: Scout: Rivals: 247Sports: ESPN:					
Dustin Weeks #116 OT	Deering, ND	Glenburn HS	6 ft 9 in (2.06 m)	263 lb (119 kg)	–	Jun 15, 2015
Dustin Weeks #116 OT	Recruit ratings: Scout: Rivals: 247Sports: ESPN:					
Alec Stewart; TE	Alisa Viejo, CA	Santa Margarita Catholic HS	6 ft 5 in (1.96 m)	240 lb (110 kg)	–	Jan 28, 2016
Alec Stewart; TE	Recruit ratings: Scout: Rivals: 247Sports: ESPN:					
Parker Dumas; WR	North Bend, WA	Mount Si HS	6 ft 5 in (1.96 m)	200 lb (91 kg)	–	Dec 7, 2015
Parker Dumas; WR	Recruit ratings: Scout: Rivals: 247Sports: ESPN:					
Jace Webb; OG	Hollis, OK	Hollis HS	6 ft 4 in (1.93 m)	285 lb (129 kg)	–	Sep 7, 2015
Jace Webb; OG	Recruit ratings: Scout: Rivals: 247Sports: ESPN:					
Ja'Chai Baker; DT	Council Bluffs, IA	Lewis Central HS	6 ft 8 in (2.03 m)	260 lb (120 kg)	–	Dec 2, 2015
Ja'Chai Baker; DT	Recruit ratings: Scout: Rivals: 247Sports: ESPN:					
Josh Boyd; S	Bakersfield, CA	Bakersfield West HS	6 ft 3 in (1.91 m)	178 lb (81 kg)	–	Dec 1, 2015
Josh Boyd; S	Recruit ratings: Scout: Rivals: 247Sports: ESPN:					
Rico Gafford; CB	Des Moines, IA	Iowa Western CC	5 ft 11 in (1.80 m)	180 lb (82 kg)	–	Dec 13, 2015
Rico Gafford; CB	Recruit ratings: Scout: Rivals: 247Sports: ESPN:					
Alijah Halliburton; S	Aurora, CO	Overland HS	6 ft 2 in (1.88 m)	180 lb (82 kg)	–	Dec 6, 2015
Alijah Halliburton; S	Recruit ratings: Scout: Rivals: 247Sports: ESPN:					
Gavin Rush; OG	Phillips, NE	Aurora HS	6 ft 3 in (1.91 m)	285 lb (129 kg)	–	Jul 12, 2015
Gavin Rush; OG	Recruit ratings: Scout: Rivals: 247Sports: ESPN:					
Braden Smith; CB	Lakewood, CO	Lakewood HS	5 ft 11 in (1.80 m)	175 lb (79 kg)	–	Sep 5, 2015
Braden Smith; CB	Recruit ratings: Scout: Rivals: 247Sports: ESPN:					
Theo Dawson; RB	Jackson, WY	Jackson Hole HS	6 ft 2 in (1.88 m)	218 lb (99 kg)	–	Jan 31, 2016
Theo Dawson; RB	Recruit ratings: Scout: Rivals: 247Sports: ESPN:					
Mike Green; RB	Sacramento, CA	Grant Union HS	5 ft 11 in (1.80 m)	192 lb (87 kg)	–	Jan 30, 2016
Mike Green; RB	Recruit ratings: Scout: Rivals: 247Sports: ESPN:					
Tyler Hall; CB	Los Angeles, CA	Junipero Serra HS	5 ft 10 in (1.78 m)	175 lb (79 kg)	–	Dec 12, 2015
Tyler Hall; CB	Recruit ratings: Scout: Rivals: 247Sports: ESPN:					
Drew Harvey; LB	Crete, IL	Crete-Monee HS	6 ft 0 in (1.83 m)	200 lb (91 kg)	–	Dec 8, 2015
Drew Harvey; LB	Recruit ratings: Scout: Rivals: 247Sports: ESPN:					
Adrian King; LB	Denver, CO	George Washington HS	6 ft 2 in (1.88 m)	210 lb (95 kg)	–	Sep 30, 2015
Adrian King; LB	Recruit ratings: Scout: Rivals: 247Sports: ESPN:					
Sam Maughan; TE	Oregon City, OR	Oregon City HS	6 ft 4 in (1.93 m)	210 lb (95 kg)	–	Dec 14, 2015
Sam Maughan; TE	Recruit ratings: Scout: Rivals: 247Sports: ESPN:					
Jahmari Moore; LB	Oak Park, IL	Oak Park and River Forest HS	6 ft 3 in (1.91 m)	220 lb (100 kg)	–	Dec 6, 2015
Jahmari Moore; LB	Recruit ratings: Scout: Rivals: 247Sports: ESPN:					
Cassh Maluia; DB	Paramount, CA	Paramount HS	6 ft 0 in (1.83 m)	207 lb (94 kg)	–	Jan 22, 2016
Cassh Maluia; DB	Recruit ratings: Scout: Rivals: 247Sports: ESPN:					
Zach Taylor; FB	Gillette, WY	Campbell County HS	5 ft 11 in (1.80 m)	211 lb (96 kg)	–	Jan 26, 2016
Zach Taylor; FB	Recruit ratings: Scout: Rivals: 247Sports: ESPN:					
Shiloh Windsor; LB	Ada, OK	Ada HS	6 ft 3 in (1.91 m)	221 lb (100 kg)	–	Sep 20, 2015
Shiloh Windsor; LB	Recruit ratings: Scout: Rivals: 247Sports: ESPN:					
Taniela Lolohea; DE	Hawthorne, CA	El Camino College	6 ft 1 in (1.85 m)	245 lb (111 kg)	–	Mar 1, 2016
Taniela Lolohea; DE	Recruit ratings: Scout: Rivals: 247Sports: ESPN:					
Hunter Van Emmerik; DT	Ferndale, CA	College of the Redwoods	6 ft 4 in (1.93 m)	275 lb (125 kg)	–	Apr 1, 2016
Hunter Van Emmerik; DT	Recruit ratings: Scout: Rivals: 247Sports: ESPN:					
Overall recruit ranking: Scout: – Rivals: – 247Sports: – ESPN: –
‡ Refers to 40-yard dash; Note: In many cases, Scout, Rivals, 247Sports, On3, and ESPN may conflict in their listings of height, weight and 40 time.; In these cases, the average was taken. ESPN grades are on a 100-point scale.; Sources: "2016 Team Ranking". Rivals.com.

== Awards and honors ==
=== All-conference ===
First Team:

Brian Hill, Jr., RB

Jacob Hollister, Sr., TE

Chase Roullier, Sr., OL

Andrew Wingard, So., DB

Second Team

Josh Allen, So., QB

Tanner Gentry, Sr., WR

D.J. May Sr., RET

Honorable Mention

Lucas Wacha Sr., LB

=== Conference awards ===
Craig Bohl – Coach of the Year

Logan Wilson – Freshman of the Year

=== All-America teams ===
Chase Roullier, Sr., OL – 2nd Team (USA Today)

Brian Hill, Jr., RB – 3rd Team (College Sports Madness)

Logan Wilson, Fr., LB – Freshman All–American (USA Today, FWAA)

=== All-star games ===
Chase Roullier – East–West Shrine Game

Lucas Wacha – NFLPA Collegiate Bowl

== Statistics ==
=== Team ===
Team Statistics
	Wyoming	Opponents
Points	503	477
First Downs	312	290
Rushing	146	120
Passing	142	152
Penalty	24	18
Rushing Yards	2876	2851
Rushing Attempts	627	537
Average Per Rush	4.6	5.3
Long	66	75
Rushing TDs	31	34
Passing Yards	3207	3493
Comp–Att	210–379	241–425
Comp %	55.4%	56.7%
Average Per Game	229.1	249.5
Average per Attempt	8.5	8.2
Passing TDs	29	23
INT's	15	15
Touchdowns	66	61
Passing	29	23
Rushing	31	34
Defensive	5	2
Interceptions	15	15
Yards	349	138
Long	66	27
Total Offense	6083	6344
Total Plays	1006	962
Average Per Yards/Game	434.5	453.1
Kick Returns: # – Yards	33–734	52–1344
TDs	0	2
Long	59	93
Punts	70	68
Yards	2891	2986
Average	41.3	43.9
Punt Returns: # – Yards	31–203	21–97
TDs	1	0
Long	60	21
Fumbles – Fumbles Lost	18–9	30–12
Opposing TD's	61	66
Penalties – Yards	66–615	84–770
3rd–Down Conversions	88/202	86/200
4th–Down Conversions	10/18	5/13
Takeaways	27	23
Field Goals	13–20	18–24
Extra Point	64–64	55–58
Sacks	30	26
Sack Against	26	30
Yards	235	189

=== Offense ===
Passing Statistics
NAME	GP	CMP	ATT	YDS	CMP%	TD	INT
Josh Allen	14	209	373	3203	56.0	28	15
Team	10	0	4	0	0.0	0	0
Austin Conway	14	1	1	4	100.0	1	0
Nick Szpor	13	0	1	0	0.0	0	0

Rushing Statistics
NAME	GP	CAR	YDS	LONG	TD
Brian Hill	14	349	1860	66	22
Josh Allen	14	142	523	38	7
Shaun Wick	14	89	354	17	1
Austin Conway	14	17	110	42	1
Nico Evans	14	11	33	18	0
Tanner Gentry	14	6	30	15	0
Jacob Hollister	14	1	2	2	0
Team	10	11	−16	0	0
Ethan Wood	14	1	−20	0	0
TOTALS	14	627	2876	66	31

Receiving Statistics
NAME	GP	REC	YDS	LONG	TD
Tanner Gentry	14	72	1326	54	14
Jake Maulhardt	14	39	614	45	4
Jacob Hollister	14	32	515	37	7
C.J. Johnson	14	21	304	43	3
Austin Conway	14	11	103	24	0
Brian Hill	14	8	67	19	0
James Price	13	6	75	23	0
Josh Harshman	14	5	50	22	0
Shaun Wick	14	4	32	20	0
Tyree Mayfield	14	3	33	15	1
Drew Van Maanen	14	3	33	22	0
Jordan Ellis	12	2	25	15	0
Joseph Parker	11	2	13	14	0
Nico Evans	14	1	13	13	0
Josh Allen	14	1	4	4	1
TOTALS	14	210	3207	54	29

=== Defense ===
Defensive Statistics
#	NAME	GP	SOLO	AST	TOT	TFL-YDS	SACKS	INT-YDS	BU	QBH	FR–YDS	FF	BLK	SAF
28	Andrew Wingard	14	75	56	131	7.5–36	2.0–25	2–33	2	0	0–0	2	0	0
6	Marcus Epps	14	72	39	111	6.0–13	0.0–0	3–94	6	0	3–0	2	0	0
45	Lucas Wacha	14	59	49	108	9.0–43	3.0–27	0–0	1	0	2–0	0	0	0
30	Logan Wilson	14	55	39	94	7.5–45	3.0–27	3–83	4	0	3–0	1	0	0
1	Antonio Hull	14	56	23	79	2.5–4	0.0–0	3–18	5	0	0–0	0	0	0
5	Rico Gafford	14	47	13	60	0.5–1	0.0–0	2–64	5	0	0–0	2	0	0
7	D.J. May	11	32	25	57	8.5–36	2.0–18	0–0	3	0	1–15	1	0	0
42	Kevin Prosser	14	22	14	36	11.0–64	6.5–47	0–0	0	4	0–0	0	0	0
93	Youhanna Ghaifan	14	15	18	33	4.5–13	3.0–8	0–0	1	0	0–0	1	0	0
57	Chase Appleby	11	12	17	29	6.0–38	2.0–19	1–55	1	2	0–0	2	0	0
53	Josiah Hall	14	6	13	19	0.0–0	0.0–0	0–0	0	0	0–0	0	0	0
91	Carl Granderson	6	9	10	19	6.0–38	4.0–35	0–0	1	3	0–0	1	0	0
96	Sidney Malauulu	11	11	5	16	2.0–3	0.0–0	1–2	0	0	0–0	0	0	0
46	Cassh Maluia	13	12	4	16	0.0–0	0.0–0	0–0	0	0	0–0	1	0	0
58	Nela Lolohea	14	10	6	16	2.0–8	1.0–7	0–0	2	0	0–0	1	0	0
2	Robert Priester	11	10	4	14	0.0–0	0.0–0	0–0	4	0	1–0	0	0	0
87	Conner Cain	14	9	5	14	2.5–10	1.5–9	0–0	0	1	1–0	0	0	0
85	Tyree Mayfield	14	10	3	13	0.0–0	0.0–0	0–0	0	0	0–0	0	0	0
3	Alijiah Halliburton	14	7	4	11	0.0–0	0.0–0	0–0	0	0	0–0	0	0	0
8	Jalen Ortiz	14	7	4	11	0.0–0	0.0–0	0–0	0	0	0–0	0	0	0
23	Tim Kamana	14	7	2	9	1.5–2	0.0–0	0–0	1	0	0–0	0	0	0
38	Jaylon Watson	11	4	4	8	0.0–0	0.0–0	0–0	0	0	0–0	0	0	0
22	Nico Evans	14	4	1	5	0.0–0	0.0–0	0–0	0	0	0–0	0	0	0
92	Shiloh Windsor	6	2	2	4	0.0–0	0.0–0	0–0	0	0	0–0	0	0	0
13	John Okwoli	13	0	3	3	0.0–0	0.0–0	0–0	0	0	0–0	0	0	0
94	Brendan Turelli	14	2	1	3	0.0–0	0.0–0	0–0	0	0	0–0	0	0	0
17	Josh Allen	14	3	0	3	0.0–0	0.0–0	0–0	0	0	0–0	1	0	0
21	Shaun Wick	14	2	0	2	0.0–0	0.0–0	0–0	0	0	0–0	0	0	0
11	Eric Nzeocha	11	2	0	2	0.0–0	0.0–0	0–0	0	0	0–0	0	0	0
98	Dalton Fields	13	2	0	2	2.0–13	2.0–13	0–0	0	0	0–0	0	0	0
40	Cooper Rothe	14	0	2	2	0.0–0	0.0–0	0–0	0	0	0–0	0	0	0
9	Tyler Hall	7	1	0	1	0.0–0	0.0–0	0–0	1	0	0–0	0	0	0
19	Anthony Makransky	1	0	1	1	0.0–0	0.0–0	0–0	0	0	0–0	0	0	0
16	Milo Hall	3	1	0	1	0.0–0	0.0–0	0–0	0	0	0–0	0	0	0
59	Ryan Cummings	7	1	0	1	0.0–0	0.0–0	0–0	0	0	0–0	0	0	0
4	Tanner Gentry	14	1	0	1	0.0–0	0.0–0	0–0	0	0	0–0	0	0	0
41	Ethan Wood	14	1	0	1	0.0–0	0.0–0	0–0	0	0	0–0	0	0	0
TM	Team	10	0	0	0	0.0–0	0.0–0	0–0	0	0	1–0	0	0	1
	TOTAL	14	572	370	942	79–367	30–235	15–349	37	10	12–15	16	0	1
	OPPONENTS	14	502	582	1084	71–311	26–189	15–138	40	14	9–30	9	1	0

Key: SOLO: Solo Tackles, AST: Assisted Tackles, TOT: Total Tackles, TFL: Tackles-for-loss, SACK: Quarterback Sacks, INT: Interceptions, BU: Passes Broken Up, QBH: Quarterback Hits, FF: Forced Fumbles, FR: Fumbles Recovered, BLK: Kicks or Punts Blocked, SAF: Safeties

Interceptions Statistics
NAME	NO.	YDS	AVG	TD	LNG
Antonio Hull	3	18	6.0	0	25
Marcus Epps	3	94	31.3	1	66
Logan Wilson	3	83	27.7	1	56
Andrew Wingard	2	33	16.5	0	20
Rico Gafford	2	64	32.0	0	32
Sidney Malauulu	1	2	2.0	0	2
Chase Appleby	1	55	55.0	1	5
TOTALS	15	349	23.3	3	66

=== Special teams ===
Kicking statistics
NAME	XPM	XPA	XP%	FGM	FGA	FG%	1–19	20–29	30–39	40–49	50+	LNG	PTS
Cooper Rothe	64	64	100.0%	13	20	65.0%	0–0	3–4	7–8	3–8	0–0	46	103
TOTALS	64	64	100.0%	13	20	65.0%	0–0	3–4	7–8	3–8	0–0	46	103

Kick return statistics
NAME	RTNS	YDS	AVG	TD	LNG
D.J. May	16	447	27.9	0	59
Rico Gafford	5	96	19.2	0	29
Nico Evans	4	74	18.5	0	24
Drew Van Maanen	2	28	14.0	0	16
Austin Conway	2	47	23.5	0	28
Josh Harshman	1	1	1.0	0	0
Lucas Wacha	1	6	6.0	0	6
Brian Hill	1	27	27.0	0	27
Jaylon Watson	1	8	8.0	0	8
TOTALS	33	734	22.2	0	59

Punting statistics
NAME	PUNTS	YDS	AVG	LONG	TB	FC	I–20	50+	BLK
Ethan Wood	70	2891	41.3	63	2	15	33	10	0
TOTALS	70	2891	41.3	63	2	15	33	10	0

Punt return statistics
NAME	RTNS	YDS	AVG	TD	LONG
Austin Conway	31	203	6.5	1	60
TOTALS	31	203	6.5	1	60

=== Scores by quarter (all opponents) ===
	1	2	3	4	OT	Total
All opponents	86	136	107	124	24	477
Wyoming	74	160	121	121	27	503

== Players in the 2017 NFL draft ==
Player	Position	Round	Pick	NFL team
Brian Hill	RB	5	156 (12)	Atlanta Falcons
Chase Roullier	C	6	199 (15)	Washington Redskins
Tanner Gentry	WR	UDFA	–	Chicago Bears
Jacob Hollister	TE	UDFA	–	New England Patriots
Lucas Wacha	LB	UDFA	–	Dallas Cowboys
