= 2016 Mountain West Conference Football Championship Game =

- Conference Championship
| San Diego State Aztecs | Wyoming Cowboys |
| (9–3) | (8–4) |
| 27 | 24 |
| Head coach: Rocky Long | Head coach: Craig Bohl |
| | 1 | 2 | 3 | 4 | Total |
|---|---|---|---|---|---|
| San Diego State | 7 | 3 | 14 | 3 | 27 |
| Wyoming | 10 | 0 | 0 | 14 | 24 |
- Date: December 3, 2016
- Season: 2016
- Stadium: War Memorial Stadium
- Location: Laramie, WY
- MVP: Offensive: Rashaad Penny (RB, SDSU); Defensive: Damontae Kazee (S, SDSU)
- Favorite: San Diego State by 7
- Referee: Kevin Mar
- Attendance: 24,001

United States TV coverage
- Network: ESPN
- Announcers: Steve Levy, Brian Griese, Todd McShay

2016 Mountain West Conference football standings
| | Conf. | | | Overall |
| Team | W | | L | W | | L |
|---|---|---|---|---|---|---|
Mountain Division
| Wyoming xy | 6 | – | 2 | 8 | – | 6 |
| Boise State x | 6 | – | 2 | 10 | – | 3 |
| New Mexico x | 6 | – | 2 | 9 | – | 4 |
| Air Force | 5 | – | 3 | 10 | – | 3 |
| Colorado State | 5 | – | 3 | 7 | – | 6 |
| Utah State | 1 | – | 7 | 3 | – | 9 |
West Division
| No. 25 San Diego State xy$ | 6 | – | 2 | 11 | – | 3 |
| Hawaii | 4 | – | 4 | 7 | – | 7 |
| Nevada | 3 | – | 5 | 5 | – | 7 |
| San Jose State | 3 | – | 5 | 4 | – | 8 |
| UNLV | 3 | – | 5 | 4 | – | 8 |
| Fresno State | 0 | – | 8 | 1 | – | 11 |
Championship: San Diego State 27, Wyoming 24
$ – Conference champion; x – Division champion/co-champions; y – Championship game participant; Rankings from AP Poll

The 2016 Mountain West Conference Championship Game was played on Saturday, December 3, 2016, at War Memorial Stadium in Laramie, Wyoming, and determined the 2016 football champion of the Mountain West Conference (MW). The game featured the MW West Division champion San Diego State Aztecs visiting the Mountain Division co-champion Wyoming Cowboys, with the Aztecs winning 27–24. It was broadcast nationally by ESPN for the second consecutive year.

The championship game was hosted by the participant with the best record in MW play. If the teams have the same conference record, a tiebreaker system is used. Even though the two teams played a conference game on November 19, with Wyoming winning, the MW does not use head-to-head results as its first tiebreaker in such a situation. The first tiebreaker of College Football Playoff ranking could not be used because neither team was ranked going into the final week of conference play. The second tiebreaker of a composite of computer rankings was used, with Wyoming receiving hosting rights.

The 2016 championship game was the fourth edition of the event. In the 2015 championship game, San Diego State defeated Air Force 27–24.

The officials for the game were Kevin Mar (referee), Michael Henderson (umpire), Bill Scott (head linesman), Darren Deckard (lind judge), Dave Curschman (side judge), Robert "Scooter" Asel (field judge), Robert Lewis (back judge), and Darren Winkley (center judge).

== Teams ==
=== San Diego State ===
The Aztecs got off to a 3–0 start after entering their first two games unranked in the AP Poll. Their second victory was against Pac-12 member California 45–40. Entering the fifth week after a bye, San Diego State traveled to Mobile, Alabama to face South Alabama, losing 42–24. The Aztecs then stormed through the conference undefeated 5–0, clinching the West Division for the second consecutive season. San Diego State lost its final two regular-season games, both in conference play—34–33 at Wyoming and 63–31 at home to Colorado State. The second loss ultimately cost the Aztecs a chance to host the title game.

=== Wyoming ===
The Cowboys entered the season poorly regarded, predicted by conference media to finish last in the Mountain Division at the MW football media days in July 2016 and also receiving the fewest points in the preseason media poll for any MW team since 2004. Wyoming finished its nonconference schedule 2–2, but then started its conference schedule 5–0, defeating then-nationally ranked Boise State during this stretch. The Cowboys suffered their first MW loss on November 12 at UNLV, rebounded the following week with their win over San Diego State, but lost their conference finale 56–35 at New Mexico on November 26. However, by the time of the New Mexico game, the Cowboys were already assured of winning a tiebreaker to represent the Mountain Division by virtue of Boise State's loss to Air Force. Wyoming finished in a three-way tie with Boise State and New Mexico at 6–2; all three teams were level on the first tiebreaker of head-to-head record, with Wyoming winning the second tiebreaker of division record (4–1 to 3–2 for Boise State and New Mexico).

The Cowboys were assured of the best conference finish ever for any MW team that was picked last in the preseason media poll, with the best previous finish for such a team being third. Their title-game loss kept them from becoming the first such team to win the MW title.

== Game summary ==
=== Scoring summary ===
Scoring summary

| Quarter | Time | Drive | | | Team | Scoring information | Score | |
| Quarter | Time | Plays | Yards | TOP | Team | Scoring information | SDSU | WY |
|---|---|---|---|---|---|---|---|---|
| 1 | 8:04 | 5 | 18 | 1:23 | WYO | 46-yard field goal by Cooper Rothe | 0 | 3 |
| 1 | 4:49 | 3 | 17 | 1:26 | WYO | Jacob Hollister 12-yard touchdown reception from Josh Allen, Cooper Rothe kick good | 0 | 10 |
| 1 | 1:46 | 7 | 62 | 3:03 | SDSU | Donnel Pumphrey 9-yard touchdown run, John Baron kick good | 7 | 10 |
| 2 | 9:39 | 10 | 50 | 4:37 | SDSU | 37-yard field goal by John Baron | 10 | 10 |
| 3 | 12:35 | 4 | 31 | 1:31 | SDSU | Rashaad Penny 6-yard touchdown run, John Baron kick good | 17 | 10 |
| 3 | 1:25 | 8 | 75 | 4:12 | SDSU | Rashaad Penny 6-yard touchdown run, John Baron kick good | 24 | 10 |
| 4 | 13:49 | 8 | 75 | 2:36 | WYO | Tanner Gentry 33-yard touchdown reception from Josh Allen, Cooper Rothe kick good | 24 | 17 |
| 4 | 6:54 | 7 | 19 | 3:59 | SDSU | 20-yard field goal by John Baron | 27 | 17 |
| 4 | 6:12 | 2 | 75 | 0:42 | WYO | C. J. Johnson 43-yard touchdown reception from Josh Allen, Cooper Rothe kick good | 27 | 24 |
| "TOP" = time of possession. For other American football terms, see Glossary of American football. | | | | | | | 27 | 24 |

=== Statistics ===
| Statistics | SDSU | WYO |
|---|---|---|
| First downs | 16 | 13 |
| Plays–yards | 66-327 | 62-343 |
| Rushes–yards | 53-242 | 31–95 |
| Passing yards | 85 | 248 |
| Passing: Comp–Att–Int | 6-13-2 | 14–31–1 |
| Time of possession | 33:55 | 26:05 |
