= 2016 Poinsettia Bowl =

2016 San Diego County Credit Union Poinsettia Bowl
- 12th Poinsettia Bowl
BYU Cougars	Wyoming Cowboys
(8–4)	(8–5)
Independent	Mountain West
24	21
Head coach: Kalani Sitake	Head coach: Craig Bohl
	1	2	3	4	Total
BYU	7	3	7	7	24
Wyoming	0	0	7	14	21
- Date: December 21, 2016
- Season: 2016
- Stadium: Qualcomm Stadium
- Location: San Diego, California
- MVP: Offensive: BYU RB Jamaal Williams; Defensive: BYU LB Harvey Langi
- Favorite: BYU by 10
- National anthem: Los 5
- Referee: Greg Blum (MAC)
- Attendance: 28,114
- Payout: US$612,500 per team

United States TV coverage
- Network: ESPN
- Announcers: Jason Benetti, Kelly Stouffer, Paul Caracaterra (TV); Bill Rosinski, David Norrie, Ian Fitzsimmons (ESPN Radio)

The 2016 Poinsettia Bowl was a college football bowl game played on December 21, 2016, at Qualcomm Stadium in San Diego, California. The twelfth and final edition of the Poinsettia Bowl featured the BYU Cougars against the Wyoming Cowboys. It began at 6:00 p.m. PST and aired ESPN. It was one of the 2016–17 bowl games concluding the 2016 FBS football season. Sponsored by San Diego County Credit Union, the game was officially known as the San Diego County Credit Union Poinsettia Bowl.

Following this edition of the Poinsettia Bowl, the bowl's operator, the San Diego Bowl Game Association, elected to put the game on hiatus to focus efforts on the Holiday Bowl. The bowl remained dormant until being revived in 2026.

== Teams ==
The game featured the BYU Cougars against the Wyoming Cowboys.

This was the 78th meeting between the schools, with BYU leading the all-time series 44–30–3. From 1922 until 2010, BYU and Wyoming had been in the same conference, being together in the Rocky Mountain Athletic Conference, the Mountain States Conference, the Western Athletic Conference, and the Mountain West Conference until BYU football went independent after 2010.

The most recent meeting was on October 23, 2010, where the Cougars defeated the Cowboys by a score of 25–20.

=== BYU Cougars ===
On November 6, 2013, it was announced that BYU would participate in the 2016 and 2018 Poinsettia Bowls should they be bowl eligible and not selected for one of the College Football Playoff bowl games.

After their 37–7 victory over Southern Utah (which improved their record to 6–4 and made them bowl-eligible), bowl director Ted Tollner (who, incidentally, served as quarterbacks coach at BYU for the 1981 season) extended an invitation for the Cougars to play in the game, which they accepted.

This was the Cougars' second Poinsettia Bowl appearance, following their victory over the San Diego State Aztecs in the 2012 Poinsettia Bowl by a score of 23–6.

=== Wyoming Cowboys ===
The Wyoming Cowboys became bowl eligible with an upset 30–28 win over the then-13th ranked Boise State Broncos. After starting the season 2–2, the Cowboys won five consecutive games. They then had a 69–66 triple-overtime loss to UNLV en route to a 1–3 record in their final four games, one of which was a 27–24 loss to San Diego State in the Mountain West Conference title game.

This was the Cowboys' first Poinsettia Bowl appearance.

== Game summary ==
	1	2	3	4	Total
Cougars	7	3	7	7	24
Cowboys	0	0	7	14	21

The 2016 San Diego County Credit Union Poinsettia Bowl kicked off at 6:10 PT (9:10 ET) in the driving rain and was broadcast on ESPN. Both teams punted on their first drives; the first drives for both teams combined for just 43 yards (BYU's for 7 and Wyoming's for 36). The Cougars second drive ended abruptly after running back Jamaal Williams fumbled after 36- and 23-yard rushes to start the drive; Wyoming took over on their own 17 and went three-and-out and punted back to the Cougars, who took over on their own 43 and went three-and-out themselves. They punted back to Wyoming with 7:45 in the first quarter, who took over on their own 16. Wyoming's third drive ended in another three-and-out, and BYU started their fourth drive on their own 32. The first injury of the game came with 5:33 left in the first quarter when Wyoming safety Marcus Epps collided with BYU RB Jamaal Williams - Epps was able to walk off with little to no help from the trainers. BYU's fourth drive ended with a third punt, which was returned to the Wyoming 20. The Cowboys went three-and-out but the snap on the punt was fumbled and a Wyoming defender jumped on the ball on the Wyoming 3. It took 2 plays for BYU to find the end zone for the first points of the game; QB Tanner Mangum scrambled for the 3-yard touchdown rush. The first quarter ended BYU 7, Wyoming 0 and the teams combined to go 0/7 on third downs in the first quarter.

Wyoming's first drive of the second quarter ended in yet another punt; BYU's Logan Taele was injured on this drive, which was BYU's first injury of the game - he was carted off the field. BYU's second turnover came on their next drive when a Tanner Mangum pass was intercepted by Wyoming's Andrew Wingard. The Cowboys stalled on this drive and were set to attempt a 42-yard field goal when holder Nick Szpor fumbled the snap; he attempted to throw for the first down but the pass was batted away and BYU took over on downs at their own 25. BYU's next drive was their longest yet; they marched 66 yards down the field and upped their lead to 10 after kicker Rhett Almond converted a 27-yard field goal. Wyoming punted on their final drive of the half and the score at halftime was BYU 10, Wyoming 0, making it the first time all season Wyoming was shut out in the first half.

BYU kicked off to Wyoming to start the third quarter and the Cowboys started on their own 40. UW's first drive of the second half featured two third down conversions and two fourth down conversions, and resulted in the Cowboys' first touchdown of the game, which cut the lead to 3. BYU's first drive of the second half saw them reach the red zone in five plays after starting at their own 43; the drive was capped by a touchdown pass that was batted around four times by both offensive and defensive players and eventually caught by BYU's Tanner Balderree in the back of the end zone. With 1:59 left in the 3rd, BYU defender Micah Hannemann was disqualified after getting called on a targeting penalty. On the very next play, Wyoming QB Josh Allen's pass was intercepted and returned by BYU's Dayan Lake to the BYU 45. The third quarter ended one play later, with the score BYU 17, Wyoming 7.

BYU started the fourth quarter with the ball on the UW 36, up by ten - two plays later, they found the end zone to up their lead to 17. The Cowboys' first drive of the fourth quarter started on their own 24, included four first downs, and resulted in a Wyoming touchdown. BYU's next drive resulted in a three-and-out, and UW got the ball back at their own 19. Wyoming's next drive was highlighted by a 3rd & 20 conversion and a touchdown pass on 3rd & 4 to pull the Cowboys back within 3. Wyoming kicked off to BYU rather than attempting an onside kick, and after a late hit penalty was enforced, BYU started their drive on their own 16. That drive went for a total for -6 yards and BYU punted back to Wyoming, who started their potential game-winning drive on their own 49 with 1:44 left in the game. The first play of the UW drive was an Allen to Hill pass for 19 yards and a first down; the next play saw a Josh Allen pass downfield intercepted by BYU's Kai Nacua to end the game.

With the final snap, BYU became the 2016 Poinsettia Bowl champion, with the final score BYU 24, Wyoming 21.

=== Scoring summary ===
Scoring summary

Quarter	Time	Drive			Team	Scoring information	Score	
Quarter	Time	Plays	Yards	TOP	Team	Scoring information	BYU	WYO
1	0:38	2	3	0:47	BYU	Tanner Mangum 3-yard touchdown run, Rhett Almond kick good	7	0
2	3:08	11	66	5:24	BYU	27-yard field goal by Rhett Almond	10	0
3	6:35	16	60	8:25	WYO	Brian Hill 4-yard touchdown run, Cooper Rothe kick good	10	7
3	2:42	8	73	3:53	BYU	Tanner Balderree 5-yard touchdown reception from Tanner Magnum, Rhett Almond kick good	17	7
4	14:07	5	55	2:36	BYU	Jamaal Williams 36-yard touchdown run, Rhett Almond kick good	24	7
4	7:35	14	76	6:32	WYO	Tanner Gentry 9-yard touchdown reception from Josh Allen, Cooper Rothe kick good	24	14
4	2:11	8	81	3:00	WYO	Tanner Gentry 23-yard touchdown reception from Josh Allen, Cooper Rothe kick good	24	21
"TOP" = time of possession. For other American football terms, see Glossary of American football.							24	21

=== Statistics ===
Statistics	BYU	WYO
First downs	13	22
Total offense, plays - yards	50–312	79–373
Rushes-yards (net)	35–216	46–166
Passing yards (net)	96	207
Passes, Comp-Att-Int	8–15–1	17–33–2
Time of Possession	24:48	35:12

Team	Category	Player	Statistics
BYU	Passing	Tanner Mangum	8/15, 96 yds, 1 TD, 1 INT
BYU	Rushing	Jamaal Williams	26 car, 210 yds, 1 TD
BYU	Receiving	Nick Kurtz	3 rec, 59 yds
WYO	Passing	Josh Allen	17/32, 207 yds, 2 TD, 2 INT
WYO	Rushing	Brian Hill	26 att, 93 yds, 1 TD
WYO	Receiving	Tanner Gentry	7 rec, 113 yds, 2 TD
