= 2016 Nevada Wolf Pack football team =

American college football season

2016 Nevada Wolf Pack football
- Conference: Mountain West Conference
- West Division
- Record: 5–7 (3–5 MW)
- Head coach: Brian Polian (4th season)
- Offensive coordinator: Tim Cramsey (1st season)
- Offensive scheme: Pistol
- Co-defensive coordinators: Scott Boone (3rd season); Bill Teerlinck (4th season)
- Base defense: 4–3
- Home stadium: Mackay Stadium

2016 Mountain West Conference football standings
	Conf.			Overall
Team	W		L	W		L
Mountain Division
Wyoming xy	6	–	2	8	–	6
Boise State x	6	–	2	10	–	3
New Mexico x	6	–	2	9	–	4
Air Force	5	–	3	10	–	3
Colorado State	5	–	3	7	–	6
Utah State	1	–	7	3	–	9
West Division
No. 25 San Diego State xy$	6	–	2	11	–	3
Hawaii	4	–	4	7	–	7
Nevada	3	–	5	5	–	7
San Jose State	3	–	5	4	–	8
UNLV	3	–	5	4	–	8
Fresno State	0	–	8	1	–	11
Championship: San Diego State 27, Wyoming 24
$ – Conference champion; x – Division champion/co-champions; y – Championship game participant; Rankings from AP Poll

The 2016 Nevada Wolf Pack football team represented the University of Nevada, Reno in the 2016 NCAA Division I FBS football season. The Wolf Pack were led by fourth–year head coach Brian Polian and played their home games at Mackay Stadium. They were members of the West Division of the Mountain West Conference. They finished the season 5–7 and 3–5 in Mountain West play to finish in a three–way tie for third place in the West Division.

On November 27, Polian and Nevada agreed to part ways. He finished at Nevada with a four year record of 23–27. Polian later returned to the Notre Dame Fighting Irish football as special teams coordinator under head coach Brian Kelly after previously serving under head coach Charlie Weis from 2005 to 2009.

== Preseason ==
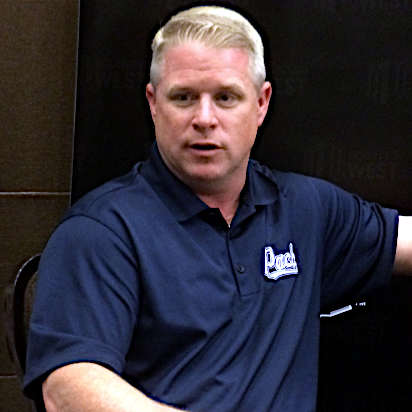
Head coach Brian Polian at the 2016 Mountain West Conference Media Days at the Cosmopolitan of Las Vegas in Paradise, Nevada on July 27, 2016

=== Mountain West media days ===
The Mountain West media days were held on July 26–27, 2016, at the Cosmopolitan in Paradise, Nevada.

=== Media poll ===
The preseason poll was released on July 26, 2016. The Wolf Pack were predicted to finish in second place in the MW West Division.

=== Preseason All–Mountain West Team ===
The Wolf Pack had one player selected to the preseason All–Mountain West Team; one from the defense.

Defense

Dameon Baber – DB

== Schedule ==
Date	Time	Opponent	Site	TV	Result	Attendance
September 2	6:30 p.m.	Cal Poly (Div. I FCS)*	Mackay Stadium; Reno, NV	Campus Insiders	W 30–27 ^{OT}	19,138
September 10	12:30 p.m.	at No. 18 Notre Dame*	Notre Dame Stadium; Notre Dame, IN	NBC	L 10–39	80,795
September 17	6:00 p.m.	Buffalo*	Mackay Stadium; Reno, NV	Campus Insiders/Twitter	W 38–14	20,457
September 24	9:00 a.m.	at Purdue*	Ross–Ade Stadium; West Lafayette, IN	ESPNews	L 14–24	41,607
October 1	9:00 p.m.	at Hawaii	Aloha Stadium; Halawa, HI	Campus Insiders/Oceanic PPV	L 17–38	23,593
October 8	4:00 p.m.	Fresno State	Mackay Stadium; Reno, NV	ESPN3	W 27–22	22,411
October 15	7:30 p.m.	at San Jose State	CEFCU Stadium; San Jose, CA	CBSSN	L 10–14	15,161
October 22	7:30 p.m.	Wyoming^{†}	Mackay Stadium; Reno, NV	ESPN2	L 34–42	18,877
November 5	7:15 p.m.	at New Mexico	University Stadium; Albuquerque, NM (Battle of the Wolves)	ESPNU	L 26–35	17,290
November 12	7:30 p.m.	San Diego State	Mackay Stadium; Reno, NV	CBSSN	L 16–46	16,730
November 19	1:00 p.m.	Utah State	Mackay Stadium; Reno, NV	ESPN3	W 38–37	13,390
November 26	1:00 p.m.	at UNLV	Sam Boyd Stadium; Whitney, NV (Battle for the Fremont Cannon / Governor's Series)	ESPN3	W 45–10	23,569
*Non-conference game; ^{†}Homecoming; Rankings from AP Poll released prior to the game; All times are in Pacific time

== Personnel ==
2016 Nevada Wolf Pack football team roster
Players
Coaches
Offense

Pos.	#	Name	Class
WR	2	Dominic Christian	Fr
TE	5	Trevion Armstrong	Fr
QB	6	Ty Gangi (C)	So
QB	7	Joe Pyle	Fr
QB	11	Hunter Fralick	So
QB	12	Hasaan Henderson	Sr
QB	13	Cristian Solano	Fr
QB	14	Dante Mayes	Jr
QB	15	Tyler Stewart (C)	Sr
WR	16	Brandon Thompson	So
WR	17	Brendan O'Leary-Orange	Fr
WR	18	Reese Neville	Fr
WR	19	Wyatt Demps	Jr
RB	20	James Butler	Jr
WR	22	Jimbo Davis IV	Jr
RB	22	Akeel Lynch	GS
RB	23	Kelton Moore	Fr
RB	24	Jaxson Kincaide	Fr
WR	28	Jason Elenberger	So
RB	29	Isaiah Hamilton	Fr
WR	31	Randy Uzoma	Sr
RB	33	Blake Wright	So
WR	40	Devin Porter	Fr
TE	43	Colin Flannery	Fr
TE	44	Kori Collins	Fr
TE	45	Austin Carrow	Sr
TE	47	Jarred Gipson	Sr
TE	49	Trae Carter-Wells	So
OL	53	Tyler Rosentreter	Jr
OL	60	Reese Backman	So
OL	62	Nathan Goltry	Sr
OL	63	Daren Echeveria	So
OL	64	Sean Krepsz	So
OL	65	Clifford Porter	Fr
OL	67	Jake Herron	Fr
OL	70	Nathan Edwards	Fr
OL	71	Jake Nelson	So
OL	72	Jeremy Macauley	Sr
OL	73	Austin Corbett	Jr
OL	74	Ilya Lopez	Jr
OL	75	Carl Burton-Hill	Fr
OL	76	Nate Brown	Fr
OL	79	Jacob Henry	Sr
WR	80	David Harvey	Fr
WR	81	Victor Gonzalez	Fr
WR	82	Tucker Melcher	Jr
WR	83	Andrew Celis	So
WR	84	Jerico Richardson	Sr
OL	85	Miles Beach	Fr
TE	86	Brandon Scott	So
WR	87	Brayden Sanchez	Sr
TE	88	Evan Faunce	Jr
TE	89	Nick Colson	Fr
OL	91	Kalei Meyer	So
OL	97	Salesa Faraimo	Sr

Defense

Pos.	#	Name	Class
DB	2	Asauni Rufus	So
DB	3	Ahki Muhammed	So
DB	4	E.J. Muhammed	Fr
DB	5	Dameon Baber	So
LB	7	Gabriel Sewell	Fr
DB, LB	8	Jaden Sawyer	Jr
DB	9	Marcus Lucas	Fr
DB	10	L.J. Jackson	Sr
DB	12	Dag Irby	Fr
DB	16	Kevin Howell	Fr
DE	17	Jarid Joseph	So
DB	18	Elijah Moody	So
DB	19	Daylon Johnson	Fr
LB	24	Lucas Weber	So
LB	25	Maliek Broady	Fr
DB	25	Daniel Brown	Fr
DB	26	Kendall Johnson	Jr
DB	28	Elijah Mitchell	Sr
DB	29	Cameron Turner	Fr
LB	30	Lawson Hall	Fr
DB	32	Devoreaux Stewart	Sr
LB	34	Travis Wilson	Jr
LB	35	Riley Brand	Fr
LB	36	Tyler Crandall	Fr
DB	37	David Kruskamp	So
LB	38	Jake Lacaden	So
DL	39	Ricky Thomas Jr.	Fr
LB	49	Alec Simpson	Fr
LB	50	Austin Paulhus	Jr
LB	51	Colton Concellos	Jr
LB	52	D.J. Powe	Fr
DL	55	Nakita Lealao	Jr
LB	56	Alex Bertrando	Sr
LB	57	John Durney	Sr
DL	58	Nolan Dambacher	Sr
DL	61	Jacob Drahos	Fr
DL	66	Thomas Newton	Jr
DL	78	Jarius McDade	Jr
LB	90	Malik Reed	So
DL	92	Nick Gregg	Fr
DL	93	Jordan Silva	So
DL	95	Patrick Choudja	Jr
DL	96	Hausia Sekona	Fr
DL	98	Kameron Toomer	Fr
DL	99	Korey Rush	So

Special teams

Pos.	#	Name	Class
PK	26	Evan Rios	Fr
PK	40	Brent Zuzo	Sr
LS	42	Wes Farnsworth	So
P	46	Alex Boy	Sr
PK	48	Spencer Pettit	Fr
LS	94	Kyler Powell	Fr

Head coach

- Brian Polian

Coordinators/assistant coaches

- Tim Cramsey – Offensive coordinator/quarterbacks
- Scott Boone – Co–Defensive coordinator/linebackers
- Bill Teerlinck – Co–Defensive coordinator/defensive line
- Lester Erb – Assistant head coach/wide receivers
- Mike Bradeson – Recruiting coordinator/safeties
- Marc Nudelberg – Special teams coordinator/running backs
- Jonathan Himebauch – Offensive line
- Cheston Blackshear – Tight ends
- Ricky Thomas – Cornerbacks
- Jeff Nady – Graduate assistant (Offense)
- Alec Drudi – Graduate assistant (Defense)
- John Landwehr – Graduate assistant (Defense)
- Jody Owens – Graduate assistant (Defense)

Support staff

- David Fox – Director of football administration
- Doug Lichtenberger – Director of football and recruiting operations
- Brad Rogers – Recruiting Operations Specialist
- Beau Worpell – Quality Control (Offense)
- Zach Coleman – Quality Control (Defense)

Legend

- (C) Team captain
- (S) Suspended
- (I) Ineligible
- Injured
- Redshirt

Roster
Last update: February 6, 2021

== Game summaries ==
=== Cal Poly ===
Cal Poly at Nevada

Team	1	2	3	4	OT	Total
Mustangs (Div. I FCS)	7	3	0	14	3	27
• Wolf Pack	21	3	0	0	6	30

- Date: September 2, 2016
- Location: Mackay Stadium
  Reno, NV
- Game start: 6:35 p.m. PDT
- Elapsed time: 3 hours and 20 minutes
- Game attendance: 19,138
- Game weather: Temperature: 77 °F (25 °C) • Weather: Sunny • Wind: 21 MPH
- Referee: Kevin Boitmann
- TV announcers (Campus Insiders): Ryan Radtke (play–by–play) and Kevin Grimes (analyst)

Scoring summary
1	12:10	NEV	James Butler 50–yard run (Brent Zuzo kick) (6 plays, 75 yards, 2:50)	NEV 7–0
1	09:13	NEV	Wyatt Demps 6–yard pass from Tyler Stewart (Brent Zuzo kick) (4 plays, 27 yards, 1:43)	NEV 14–0
1	02:52	CP	Joe Protheroe 28–yard run (Casey Sublette kick) (4 plays, 50 yards, 1:40)	NEV 14–7
1	00:49	NEV	Jerico Richardson 9–yard pass from Tyler Stewart (Brent Zuzo kick) (6 plays, 75 yards, 2:03)	NEV 21–7
2	08:28	CP	Casey Sublette 27–yard field goal (17 plays, 70 yards, 7:15)	NEV 21–10
2	00:03	NEV	Brent Zuzo 25–yard field goal (5 plays, 45 yards, 0:35)	NEV 24–10
4	14:38	CP	Dano Graves 10–yard run (Casey Sublette kick) (8 plays, 68 yards, 2:59)	NEV 24–17
4	01:20	CP	Dano Graves 1–yard run (Casey Sublette kick) (18 plays, 79 yards, 9:06)	TIE 24–24
OT	15:00	CP	Casey Sublette 37–yard field goal (4 plays, 6 yards, 0:00)	CP 27–24
OT	15:00	NEV	James Butler 5–yard run (4 plays, 25 yards, 0:00)	NEV 30–27

Statistics	Cal Poly	Nevada
First downs	23	18
Total yards	445	363
Rushing yards	383	174
Passing yards	62	189
Turnovers	6	0
Time of possession	36:09	23:51

Team	Category	Player	Statistics
Cal Poly	Passing	Dano Graves	5/12, 62 yards
Cal Poly	Rushing	Dano Graves	26 carries, 140 yards, 2 TDs
Cal Poly	Receiving	Carson McMurtrey	2 receptions, 25 yards
Nevada	Passing	Tyler Stewart	17/23, 189 yards, 2 TDs
Nevada	Rushing	James Butler	21 carries, 123 yards, 2 TDs
Nevada	Receiving	Andrew Celis	2 receptions, 47 yards

=== At Notre Dame ===
Nevada at Notre Dame

Team	1	2	3	4	Total
Wolf Pack	0	0	3	7	10
• No. 18 Fighting Irish	0	25	14	0	39

- Date: September 10, 2016
- Location: Notre Dame Stadium
  Notre Dame, IN
- Game start: 3:42 p.m. EDT
- Elapsed time: 3 hours and 25 minutes
- Game attendance: 80,795
- Game weather: Temperature: 70 °F (21 °C) • Weather: Partly Cloudy • Wind: W 12 MPH
- Referee: Jeff Maconaghy
- TV announcers (NBC): Mike Tirico (play–by–play), Doug Flutie (analyst) and Kathryn Tappen (sideline)

Scoring summary
2	12:57	ND	Justin Yoon 21–yard field goal (11 plays, 75 yards, 5:21)	ND 3–0
2	10:35	ND	C. J. Sanders 7–yard pass from DeShone Kizer (Justin Yoon kick failed) (3 plays, 25 yards, 0:55)	ND 9–0
2	10:30	ND	Team 0–yard safety	ND 11–0
2	08:23	ND	Kevin Stepherson 4–yard pass from DeShone Kizer (Justin Yoon kick) (3 plays, 4 yards, 1:05)	ND 18–0
2	00:35	ND	Tarean Folston 2–yard run (Justin Yoon kick) (13 plays, 88 yards, 4:28)	ND 25–0
3	08:30	ND	DeShone Kizer 2–yard run (Justin Yoon kick) (9 plays, 85 yards, 4:36)	ND 32–0
3	03:54	NEV	Brent Zuzo 27–yard field goal (11 plays, 66 yards, 4:36)	ND 32–3
3	00:38	ND	Dexter Williams 1–yard run (Justin Yoon kick) (7 plays, 57 yards, 3:07)	ND 39–3
4	03:19	NEV	Jaxson Kincaide 6–yard run (Brent Zuzo kick) (5 plays, 86 yards, 2:14)	ND 39–10

Statistics	Nevada	Notre Dame
First downs	16	21
Total yards	300	444
Rushing yards	99	239
Passing yards	201	205
Turnovers	0	1
Time of possession	26:28	33:32

Team	Category	Player	Statistics
Nevada	Passing	Tyler Stewart	10/23, 113 yards, 1 INT
Nevada	Rushing	James Butler	17 carries, 50 yards
Nevada	Receiving	Andrew Celis	1 reception, 68 yards
Notre Dame	Passing	DeShone Kizer	15/18, 156 yards, 2 TDs, 1 INT
Notre Dame	Rushing	Josh Adams	10 carries, 106 yards
Notre Dame	Receiving	Equanimeous St. Brown	6 receptions, 85 yards

=== Buffalo ===
Buffalo at Nevada

Team	1	2	3	4	Total
Bulls	0	0	7	7	14
• Wolf Pack	7	17	7	7	38

- Date: September 17, 2016
- Location: Mackay Stadium
  Reno, NV
- Game start: 6:05 p.m. PDT
- Elapsed time: 3 hours and 16 minutes
- Game attendance: 20,457
- Game weather: Temperature: 81 °F (27 °C) • Weather: Clear and Sunny • Wind: WNW 6 MPH
- Referee: David Alvarez
- TV announcers (Campus Insiders/Twitter): Ari Wolfe (play–by–play), Darius Walker (analyst) and Shae Peppler (sideline)

Scoring summary
1	09:19	NEV	Tyler Stewart 9–yard run (Brent Zuzo kick) (8 plays, 72 yards, 3:15)	NEV 7–0
2	14:52	NEV	Brent Zuzo 23–yard field goal (5 plays, 51 yards, 1:13)	NEV 10–0
2	06:50	NEV	James Butler 2–yard run (Brent Zuzo kick) (15 plays, 87 yards, 6:45)	NEV 17–0
2	01:13	NEV	James Butler 4–yard run (Brent Zuzo kick) (11 plays, 75 yards, 4:05)	NEV 24–0
3	09:01	NEV	James Butler 1–yard run (Brent Zuzo kick) (13 plays, 75 yards, 5:59)	NEV 31–0
3	03:01	UB	Jordan Johnson 57–yard pass from Tyree Jackson (Adam Mitcheson kick) (7 plays, 80 yards, 2:29)	NEV 31–7
4	11:51	NEV	Wyatt Demps 2–yard pass from Tyler Stewart (Brent Zuzo kick) (15 plays, 75 yards, 6:10)	NEV 38–7
4	08:50	UB	Jordan Johnson 12–yard run (Adam Mitcheson kick) (7 plays, 75 yards, 3:01)	NEV 38–14

Statistics	Buffalo	Nevada
First downs	17	32
Total yards	361	521
Rushing yards	231	352
Passing yards	130	169
Turnovers	0	0
Time of possession	20:31	39:29

Team	Category	Player	Statistics
Buffalo	Passing	Tyree Jackson	7/22, 130 yards, 1 TD
Buffalo	Rushing	Jordan Johnson	17 carries, 87 yards, 1 TD
Buffalo	Receiving	Jordan Johnson	1 reception, 57 yards, 1 TD
Nevada	Passing	Tyler Stewart	16/21, 160 yards, 1 TD
Nevada	Rushing	James Butler	28 carries, 174 yards, 3 TDs
Nevada	Receiving	Jerico Richardson	3 receptions, 46 yards

=== At Purdue ===
Nevada at Purdue

Team	1	2	3	4	Total
Wolf Pack	7	7	0	0	14
• Boilermakers	0	10	7	7	24

- Date: September 24, 2016
- Location: Ross–Ade Stadium
  West Lafayette, IN
- Game start: 12:01 p.m. EDT
- Elapsed time: 3 hours and 3 minutes
- Game attendance: 41,607
- Game weather: Temperature: 68 °F (20 °C) • Weather: Mostly Cloudy • Wind: E 7 MPH
- Referee: Mike Cannon
- TV announcers (ESPNews): Mike Couzens (play–by–play) and Dan Hawkins (analyst)

Scoring summary
1	05:00	NEV	Hasaan Henderson 15–yard pass from Tyler Stewart (Brent Zuzo kick) (10 plays, 61 yards, 4:47)	NEV 7–0
2	13:10	PUR	J. D. Dellinger 36–yard field goal (15 plays, 58 yards, 6:50)	NEV 7–3
2	05:56	NEV	James Butler 6–yard pass from Tyler Stewart (Brent Zuzo kick) (3 plays, 20 yards, 1:19)	NEV 14–3
2	01:20	PUR	Bilal Marshall 48–yard pass from David Blough (J. D. Dellinger kick) (7 plays, 80 yards, 1:42)	NEV 14–10
3	08:03	PUR	Markell Jones 5–yard run (J. D. Dellinger kick) (12 plays, 49 yards, 4:17)	PUR 17–14
4	01:17	PUR	Brycen Hopkins 51–yard pass from David Blough (J. D. Dellinger kick) (6 plays, 80 yards, 2:59)	PUR 24–17

Statistics	Nevada	Purdue
First downs	18	25
Total yards	253	466
Rushing yards	68	166
Passing yards	185	300
Turnovers	0	6
Time of possession	28:09	31:51

Team	Category	Player	Statistics
Nevada	Passing	Tyler Stewart	22/29, 178 yards, 2 TDs
Nevada	Rushing	James Butler	14 carries, 38 yards
Nevada	Receiving	James Butler	6 receptions, 44 yards, 1 TD
Purdue	Passing	David Blough	21/30, 300 yards, 2 TDs, 1 INT
Purdue	Rushing	Markell Jones	22 carries, 124 yards, 1 TD
Purdue	Receiving	Bilal Marshall	5 receptions, 82 yards, 1 TD

=== At Hawaii ===
Nevada at Hawaii

Team	1	2	3	4	Total
Wolf Pack	0	3	0	14	17
• Rainbow Warriors	3	14	21	0	38

- Date: October 1, 2016
- Location: Aloha Stadium
  Halawa, HI
- Game start: 6:08 p.m.
- Elapsed time: 3 hours and 19 minutes
- Game attendance: 23,593
- Game weather: Temperature: 78 °F (26 °C) • Weather: Partly Cloudy • Wind: ENE 13 MPH
- Referee: Scott Campbell
- TV announcers (Campus Insiders/Oceanic PPV): Robert Kekaula (play–by–play), Rich Miano (analyst) and Scott Robbs (sideline)

Scoring summary
1	05:23	UH	Rigoberto Sanchez 27–yard field goal (10 plays, 81 yards, 6:06)	UH 3–0
2	08:43	UH	Steven Lakalaka 4–yard run (Rigoberto Sanchez kick) (10 plays, 88 yards, 4:05)	UH 10–0
2	02:28	NEV	Brent Zuzo 31–yard field goal (14 plays, 61 yards, 6:15)	UH 10–3
2	00:48	UH	Metuisela 'Unga 16–yard pass from Dru Brown (Rigoberto Sanchez kick) (6 plays, 79 yards, 1:35)	UH 17–3
3	13:48	UH	John Ursua 5–yard run (Rigoberto Sanchez kick) (4 plays, 75 yards, 1:12)	UH 24–3
3	06:10	UH	Metuisela 'Unga 8–yard pass from Dru Brown (Rigoberto Sanchez kick) (6 plays, 95 yards, 2:48)	UH 31–3
3	01:02	UH	Kaiwi Chung 1–yard run (Rigoberto Sanchez kick) (6 plays, 58 yards, 3:07)	UH 38–3
4	10:09	NEV	Wyatt Demps 9–yard pass from Tyler Stewart (Brent Zuzo kick) (8 plays, 65 yards, 3:21)	UH 38–10
4	05:02	NEV	Jaxson Kincaide 2–yard run (Brent Zuzo kick) (4 plays, 69 yards, 1:11)	UH 38–17

Statistics	Nevada	Hawaii
First downs	23	24
Total yards	397	566
Rushing yards	194	344
Passing yards	203	222
Turnovers	0	3
Time of possession	31:36	28:24

Team	Category	Player	Statistics
Nevada	Passing	Tyler Stewart	19/33, 203 yards, 1 TD
Nevada	Rushing	James Butler	21 carries, 168 yards
Nevada	Receiving	Wyatt Demps	4 receptions, 53 yards, 1 TD
Hawaii	Passing	Dru Brown	15/18, 222 yards, 2 TDs
Hawaii	Rushing	Diocemy Saint Juste	19 carries, 205 yards
Hawaii	Receiving	Marcus Kemp	6 receptions, 88 yards

=== Fresno State ===
Fresno State at Nevada

Team	1	2	3	4	Total
Bulldogs	6	0	7	9	22
• Wolf Pack	7	14	0	6	27

- Date: October 8, 2016
- Location: Mackay Stadium
  Reno, NV
- Game start: 4:04 p.m. PDT
- Elapsed time: 3 hours and 18 minutes
- Game attendance: 22,411
- Game weather: Temperature: 78 °F (26 °C) • Weather: Sunny • Wind: N/A
- Referee: Kevin Mar
- TV announcers (ESPN3): Trey Bender (play–by–play) and Jay Taylor (analyst)

Scoring summary
1	09:13	FS	Kody Kroening 44–yard field goal (9 plays, 59 yards, 3:11)	FS 3–0
1	04:48	NEV	Wyatt Demps 36–yard pass from Andrew Celis (Brent Zuzo kick) (10 plays, 82 yards, 4:20)	NEV 7–3
1	00:00	FS	Kody Korening 25–yard field goal (11 plays, 57 yards, 4:48)	NEV 7–6
2	04:22	NEV	Tyler Stewart 4–yard run (Brent Zuzo kick) (10 plays, 44 yards, 3:33)	NEV 14–6
2	00:12	NEV	Wyatt Demps 3–yard pass from Tyler Stewart (Brent Zuzo kick) (9 plays, 84 yards, 1:21)	NEV 21–6
3	01:26	FS	Jared Rice 1–yard pass from Chason Virgil (Kody Kroening kick) (15 plays, 65 yards, 8:13)	NEV 21–13
4	13:37	FS	Kody Kroening 35–yard field goal (5 plays, 25 yards, 2:13)	NEV 21–16
4	07:56	NEV	Wyatt Demps 8–yard pass from Tyler Stewart (Brent Zuzo kick failed) (14 plays, 75 yards, 5:41)	NEV 27–16
4	05:08	FS	Dontel James 5–yard run (Chason Virgil pass failed) (9 plays, 75 yards, 2:48)	NEV 27–22

Statistics	Fresno State	Nevada
First downs	25	23
Total yards	452	389
Rushing yards	255	226
Passing yards	197	163
Turnovers	5	2
Time of possession	32:08	27:52

Team	Category	Player	Statistics
Fresno State	Passing	Chason Virgil	16/27, 197 yards, 1 TD
Fresno State	Rushing	Dontel James	27 carries, 169 yards, 1 TD
Fresno State	Receiving	KeeSean Johnson	5 receptions, 71 yards
Nevada	Passing	Tyler Stewart	13/20, 127 yards, 2 TDs
Nevada	Rushing	James Butler	37 carries, 175 yards
Nevada	Receiving	Wyatt Demps	9 receptions, 124 yards, 3 TDs

=== At San Jose State ===
Nevada at San Jose State

Team	1	2	3	4	Total
Wolf Pack	0	0	3	7	10
• Spartans	0	7	0	7	14

- Date: October 15, 2016
- Location: CEFCU Stadium
  San Jose, CA
- Game start: 7:37 p.m. PDT
- Elapsed time: 3 hours and 17 minutes
- Game attendance: 15,161
- Game weather: Temperature: 66 °F (19 °C) • Weather: Rain • Wind: S 11 MPH
- Referee: David Alvarez
- TV announcers (CBSSN): Rich Waltz (play–by–play), Eric Davis (analyst) and Cassie McKinney (sideline)

Scoring summary
2	11:20	SJSU	Kenny Potter 3–yard run (Bryce Crawford kick) (7 plays, 23 yards, 3:27)	SJSU 7–0
3	00:31	NEV	Spencer Pettit 28–yard field goal (13 plays, 65 yards, 6:39)	SJSU 7–3
4	06:52	NEV	James Butler 46–yard pass from Tyler Stewart (Spencer Pettit kick) (6 plays, 77 yards, 2:07)	NEV 10–7
4	00:50	SJSU	Kenny Potter 3–yard run (Bryce Crawford kick) (12 plays, 84 yards, 5:55)	SJSU 14–10

Statistics	Nevada	San Jose State
First downs	13	20
Total yards	257	279
Rushing yards	113	137
Passing yards	144	142
Turnovers	0	1
Time of possession	23:32	36:28

Team	Category	Player	Statistics
Nevada	Passing	Tyler Stewart	9/20, 144 yards, 1 TD, 2 INTs
Nevada	Rushing	James Butler	20 carries, 94 yards
Nevada	Receiving	James Butler	3 receptions, 92 yards, 1 TD
San Jose State	Passing	Kenny Potter	11/17, 142 yards
San Jose State	Rushing	Malik Roberson	35 carries, 139 yards
San Jose State	Receiving	Tre Hartley	5 receptions, 76 yards

=== Wyoming ===
Wyoming at Nevada

Team	1	2	3	4	Total
• Cowboys	7	14	14	7	42
Wolf Pack	0	13	14	7	34

- Date: October 22, 2016
- Location: Mackay Stadium
  Reno, NV
- Game start: 7:41 p.m. PDT
- Elapsed time: 3 hours and 35 minutes
- Game attendance: 18,877
- Game weather: Temperature: 62 °F (17 °C) • Weather: Cool • Wind: SSE 7 MPH
- Referee: Kevin Hassell
- TV announcers (ESPN2): Dave LaMont (play–by–play) and Tom Ramsey (analyst)

Scoring summary
1	06:58	WYO	Brian Hill 56–yard run (Cooper Rothe kick) (3 plays, 65 yards, 1:01)	WYO 7–0
2	14:05	NEV	Spencer Pettit 45–yard field goal (12 plays, 44 yards, 5:28)	WYO 7–3
2	10:01	WYO	Brian Hill 2–yard run (Cooper Rothe kick) (8 plays, 92 yards, 3:59)	WYO 14–3
2	06:47	NEV	Ty Gangi 17–yard run (Spencer Pettit kick) (10 plays, 75 yards, 3:14)	WYO 14–10
2	01:23	WYO	Josh Allen 1–yard run (Cooper Rothe kick) (13 plays, 75 yards, 5:24)	WYO 21–10
2	00:25	NEV	Spencer Pettit 44–yard field goal (10 plays, 52 yards, 0:53)	WYO 21–13
3	08:44	WYO	Josh Allen 4–yard pass from Austin Conway (Cooper Rothe kick) (13 plays, 75 yards, 6:16)	WYO 28–13
3	06:27	NEV	James Butler 9–yard run (Spencer Pettit kick) (6 plays, 54 yards, 2:08)	WYO 28–20
3	04:15	WYO	Brian Hill 20–yard run (Cooper Rothe kick) (7 plays, 57 yards, 2:05)	WYO 35–20
3	01:03	NEV	Jarred Gipson 27–yard pass from Ty Gangi (Spencer Pettit kick) (7 plays, 75 yards, 3:06)	WYO 35–27
4	02:52	WYO	Josh Allen 7–yard run (Cooper Rothe kick) (9 plays, 80 yards, 4:42)	WYO 42–27
4	00:40	NEV	James Butler 0–yard fumble recovery (Spencer Pettit kick)	WYO 42–34

Statistics	Wyoming	Nevada
First downs	27	32
Total yards	540	479
Rushing yards	391	132
Passing yards	149	347
Turnovers	0	3
Time of possession	31:41	28:19

Team	Category	Player	Statistics
Wyoming	Passing	Josh Allen	9/13, 145 yards
Wyoming	Rushing	Brian Hill	29 carries, 289 yards, 3 TDs
Wyoming	Receiving	Tanner Gentry	4 receptions, 109 yards
Nevada	Passing	Ty Gangi	27/43, 300 yards, 1 TD, 1 INT
Nevada	Rushing	James Butler	14 carries, 73 yards, 2 TDs
Nevada	Receiving	Wyatt Demps	8 receptions, 97 yards

=== At New Mexico ===
Nevada at New Mexico
(Battle of the Wolves)

Team	1	2	3	4	Total
Wolf Pack	0	14	0	12	26
• Lobos	7	7	14	7	35

- Date: November 5, 2016
- Location: University Stadium
  Albuquerque, NM
- Game start: 8:26 p.m. MDT
- Elapsed time: 2 hours and 55 minutes
- Game attendance: 17,290
- Game weather: Temperature: 55 °F (13 °C) • Weather: Overcast/Rain • Wind: 5 MPH • Note: Game was delayed by lightning after halftime for 1 hour and 49 minutes.
- Referee: Kevin Boitmann
- TV announcers (ESPNU): Roy Philpott (play–by–play) and Brian Kinchen (analyst)

Scoring summary
1	09:45	NM	Richard McQuarley 3–yard run (Jason Sanders kick) (11 plays, 75 yards, 5:15)	NM 7–0
2	13:36	NEV	James Butler 9–yard run (Spencer Pettit kick) (9 plays, 80 yards, 3:35)	TIE 7–7
2	06:13	NEV	Wyatt Demps 12–yard pass from Ty Gangi (Spencer Pettit kick) (8 plays, 91 yards, 2:28)	NEV 14–7
2	02:17	NM	Tyrone Owens 25–yard run (Jason Sanders kick) (8 plays, 75 yards, 3:56)	TIE 14–14
3	05:50	NM	Lamar Jordan II 4–yard pass from Austin Apodaca (Jason Sanders kick) (14 plays, 63 yards, 7:41)	NM 21–14
3	01:16	NM	Emmanuel Harris 44–yard pass from Austin Apodaca (Jason Sanders kick) (6 plays, 66 yards, 2:57)	NM 28–14
4	13:19	NEV	Brandon Scott 19–yard pass from Ty Gangi (Spencer Pettit kick blocked) (6 plays, 75 yards, 2:57)	NM 28–20
4	11:31	NEV	Ahki Muhammad 57–yard pass from Ty Gangi (pass failed) (1 play, 57 yards, 0:08)	NM 28–26
4	02:54	NM	Austin Apodaca 4–yard run (Jason Sanders kick) (8 plays, 57 yards, 4:49)	NM 35–26

Statistics	Nevada	New Mexico
First downs	19	23
Total yards	409	473
Rushing yards	108	373
Passing yards	301	100
Turnovers	0	3
Time of possession	19:51	40:09

Team	Category	Player	Statistics
Nevada	Passing	Ty Gangi	19/34, 301 yards, 3 TDs, 2 INTs
Nevada	Rushing	James Butler	16 carries, 94 yards, 1 TD
Nevada	Receiving	Wyatt Demps	6 receptions, 92 yards, 1 TD
New Mexico	Passing	Austin Apodaca	7/9, 96 yards, 1 TD
New Mexico	Rushing	Teriyon Gipson	20 carries, 121 yards
New Mexico	Receiving	Emmanuel Harris	1 reception, 44 yards, 1 TD

=== San Diego State ===
San Diego State at Nevada

Team	1	2	3	4	Total
• Aztecs	10	16	13	7	46
Wolf Pack	7	0	2	7	16

- Date: November 12, 2016
- Location: Mackay Stadium
  Reno, NV
- Game start: 7:37 p.m. PST
- Elapsed time: 3 hours and 14 minutes
- Game attendance: 16,730
- Game weather: Temperature: 55 °F (13 °C) • Weather: N/A • Wind: WNW 6 MPH
- Referee: Brandon Cruse
- TV announcers (CBSSN): Carter Blackburn (play–by–play), Eric Davis (analyst) and Jenny Dell (sideline)

Scoring summary
1	12:32	SDSU	Rashaad Penny 40–yard run (John Baron II kick) (6 plays, 75 yards, 2:28)	SDSU 7–0
1	07:32	NEV	Hasaan Henderson 0–yard fumble recovery (Spencer Pettit kick)	TIE 7–7
1	02:03	SDSU	John Baron II 28–yard field goal (10 plays, 64 yards, 5:29)	SDSU 10–7
2	10:19	SDSU	Donnel Pumphrey 3–yard run (John Baron II kick) (3 plays, 21 yards, 0:49)	SDSU 17–7
2	05:53	SDSU	Mikah Holder 6–yard run pass from Christian Chapman (John Baron II kick blocked) (6 plays, 32 yards, 2:35)	SDSU 23–7
2	00:03	SDSU	John Baron II 31–yard field goal (10 plays, 77 yards, 1:42)	SDSU 26–7
3	04:43	SDSU	David Wells 17–yard pass from Christian Chapman (John Baron II kick blocked) (9 plays, 75 yards, 4:40)	SDSU 32–7
3	04:43	NEV	E. J. Muhammad 98–yard PAT return	SDSU 32–9
3	02:50	SDSU	Rashaad Penny 72–yard run (John Baron II kick) (2 plays, 73 yards, 0:52)	SDSU 39–9
4	14:06	NEV	Wyatt Demps 40–yard pass from Ty Gangi (Spencer Pettit kick) (8 plays, 75 yards, 3:44)	SDSU 39–16
4	07:34	SDSU	Juwan Washington 45–yard run (John Baron II kick) (3 plays, 54 yards, 1:26)	SDSU 46–16

Statistics	San Diego State	Nevada
First downs	25	19
Total yards	620	366
Rushing yards	474	90
Passing yards	146	276
Turnovers	2	1
Time of possession	28:00	32:00

Team	Category	Player	Statistics
San Diego State	Passing	Christian Chapman	11/16, 146 yards, 2 TDs
San Diego State	Rushing	Rashaad Penny	10 carries, 208 yards, 2 TDs
San Diego State	Receiving	Mikah Holder	4 receptions, 45 yards, 1 TD
Nevada	Passing	Ty Gangi	21/37, 276 yards, 2 TDs, 3 INTs
Nevada	Rushing	Jaxson Kincaide	10 carries, 41 yards
Nevada	Receiving	Wyatt Demps	4 receptions, 93 yards, 1 TD

=== Utah State ===
Utah State at Nevada

Team	1	2	3	4	Total
Aggies	7	10	10	10	37
• Wolf Pack	3	7	7	21	38

- Date: November 19, 2016
- Location: Mackay Stadium
  Reno, NV
- Game start: 1:04 p.m. PST
- Elapsed time: 3 hours and 17 minutes
- Game attendance: 13,390
- Game weather: Temperature: 59 °F (15 °C) • Weather: Sunny • Wind: S 15 MPH
- Referee: Mike Defee
- TV announcers (ESPN3): Trey Bender (play–by–play) and Jay Taylor (analyst)

Scoring summary
1	03:37	NEV	Spencer Pettit 35–yard field goal (10 plays, 29 yards, 5:16)	NEV 3–0
1	01:02	USU	Kent Myers 37–yard run (Brock Warren kick) (6 plays, 79 yards, 2:29)	USU 7–3
2	09:52	USU	Dominik Eberle 43–yard field goal (8 plays, 35 yards, 3:21)	USU 10–3
2	05:25	USU	Kent Myers 2–yard run (Brock Warren kick) (9 plays, 67 yards, 2:25)	USU 17–3
2	00:38	NEV	Wyatt Demps 1–yard pass from Ty Gangi (Spencer Pettit kick) (10 plays, 81 yards, 4:42)	USU 17–10
3	13:54	USU	Rayshad Lewis 59–yard run (Brock Warren kick) (1 play, 59 yards, 0:10)	USU 24–10
3	09:09	NEV	Jaxson Kincaide 7–yard run (Spencer Pettit kick) (11 plays, 75 yards, 4:45)	USU 24–17
3	03:11	USU	Dominik Eberle 20–yard field goal (13 plays, 62 yards, 5:58)	USU 27–17
4	11:53	NEV	James Butler 15–yard run (Spencer Pettit kick) (2 plays, 20 yards, 0:48)	USU 27–24
4	11:03	USU	Tonny Lindsey Jr. 68–yard run (Brock Warren kick) (2 plays, 77 yards, 0:44)	USU 34–24
4	07:50	USU	Dominik Eberle 22–yard field goal (4 plays, 9 yards, 1:50)	USU 37–24
4	07:19	NEV	Elijah Mitchell 0–yard fumble recovery (Spencer Pettit kick)	USU 37–31
4	00:05	NEV	Ty Gangi 6–yard run (Spencer Pettit kick) (10 plays, 51 yards, 1:32)	NEV 38–37

Statistics	Utah State	Nevada
First downs	21	22
Total yards	523	341
Rushing yards	396	214
Passing yards	127	127
Turnovers	2	2
Time of possession	27:22	32:38

Team	Category	Player	Statistics
Utah State	Passing	Kent Myers	10/18, 127 yards, 1 INT
Utah State	Rushing	Tonny Lindsey Jr.	21 carries, 168 yards, 1 TD
Utah State	Receiving	Ron'Quavion Tarver	3 receptions, 51 yards
Nevada	Passing	Ty Gangi	13/26, 127 yards, 1 TD
Nevada	Rushing	James Butler	26 carries, 119 yards, 1 TD
Nevada	Receiving	James Butler	4 receptions, 52 yards

=== At UNLV ===
Nevada at UNLV
(Battle for the Fremont Cannon / Governor's Series)

Team	1	2	3	4	Total
• Wolf Pack	10	17	3	15	45
Rebels	0	10	0	0	10

- Date: November 26, 2016
- Location: Sam Boyd Stadium
  Whitney, NV
- Game start: 1:04 p.m. PST
- Elapsed time: 2 hours and 56 minutes
- Game attendance: 23,569
- Game weather: Temperature: 66 °F (19 °C) • Weather: Fair • Wind: ENE 5 MPH
- Referee: Daniel Romeo
- TV announcers (ESPN3): Dave Raymond (play–by–play) and Tyoka Jackson (analyst)

Scoring summary
1	10:48	NEV	Ty Gangi 19–yard run (Spencer Pettit kick) (8 plays, 65 yards, 4:12)	NEV 7–0
1	07:14	NEV	Spencer Pettit 25–yard field goal (4 plays, 4 yards, 2:06)	NEV 10–0
2	14:50	NEV	James Butler 33–yard run (Spencer Pettit kick) (7 plays, 65 yards, 3:13)	NEV 17–0
2	12:22	UNLV	Kurt Palandech 27–yard run (Evan Pantels kick) (6 plays, 79 yards, 2:23)	NEV 17–7
2	06:58	NEV	Spencer Pettit 32–yard field goal (11 plays, 56 yards, 5:17)	NEV 20–7
2	02:05	NEV	James Butler 14–yard pass from Ty Gangi (Spencer Pettit kick) (7 plays, 80 yards, 2:47)	NEV 27–7
2	00:00	UNLV	Evan Pantels 47–yard field goal (11 plays, 49 yards, 1:59)	NEV 27–10
3	09:16	NEV	Spencer Pettit 38–yard field goal (9 plays, 50 yards, 3:57)	NEV 30–10
4	11:02	NEV	James Butler 3–yard run (Hasaan Henderson pass) (10 plays, 84 yards, 4:28)	NEV 38–10
4	02:31	NEV	James Butler 13–yard run (Spencer Pettit kick) (9 plays, 71 yards, 5:30)	NEV 45–10

Statistics	Nevada	UNLV
First downs	27	14
Total yards	511	303
Rushing yards	318	182
Passing yards	193	121
Turnovers	1	1
Time of possession	37:42	22:18

Team	Category	Player	Statistics
Nevada	Passing	Ty Gangi	15/22, 193 yards, 1 TD
Nevada	Rushing	James Butler	32 carries, 196 yards, 3 TDs
Nevada	Receiving	Wyatt Demps	2 receptions, 57 yards
UNLV	Passing	Kurt Palandech	9/22, 121 yards, 1 INT
UNLV	Rushing	Kurt Palandech	14 carries, 98 yards, 1 TD
UNLV	Receiving	Trevor Kanteman	2 receptions, 39 yards
