= Jacob Hollister =

American football player (born 1993)

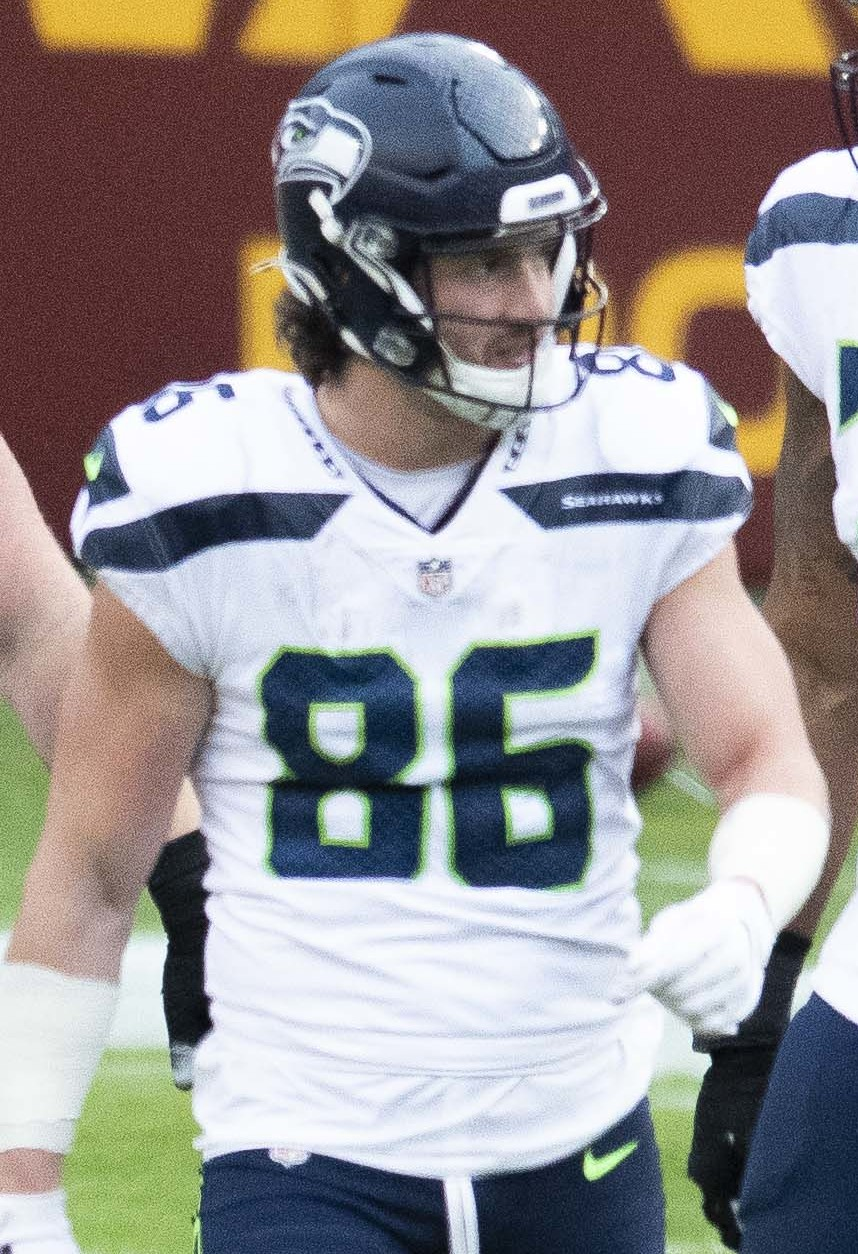
- Hollister with the Seattle Seahawks in 2020

Profile
- Position: Tight end

Personal information
- Born: November 18, 1993 (age 32); Bend, Oregon, U.S.
- Listed height: 6 ft 4 in (1.93 m)
- Listed weight: 245 lb (111 kg)

Career information
- High school: Mountain View (Bend)
- College: Nevada (2012); Arizona Western (2013); Wyoming (2014–2016)
- NFL draft: 2017: undrafted

Career history
- New England Patriots (2017–2018); Seattle Seahawks (2019–2020); Buffalo Bills (2021)*; Jacksonville Jaguars (2021); Las Vegas Raiders (2022)*; Minnesota Vikings (2022); Las Vegas Raiders (2022); Seattle Seahawks (2022)*; Las Vegas Raiders (2023)*; Carolina Panthers (2024)*
- * Offseason or practice squad member only

Awards and highlights
- Super Bowl champion (LIII); All–Mountain West Conference (2016)

Career NFL statistics
- Receptions: 83
- Receiving yards: 707
- Receiving touchdowns: 7
- Stats at Pro Football Reference

Jacob Hollister (born November 18, 1993) is an American professional football tight end. He played college football at Wyoming. He has been a member of the New England Patriots, Seattle Seahawks, Buffalo Bills, Jacksonville Jaguars, Las Vegas Raiders, and Minnesota Vikings of the National Football League (NFL).

== Early life ==
Born and raised in Bend, Oregon, Hollister graduated from its Mountain View High School in 2012 and was a three-sport letterman in football, basketball, and baseball. As a senior quarterback, he was the state's Class 5A player of the year after leading the Cougars to the state title, and originally signed to play college football at the University of Nevada in Reno.

== College career ==
Hollister redshirted for the Wolf Pack as a true freshman in 2012, then transferred to Arizona Western College, a community college in Yuma, where he switched positions to tight end. Hollister then played three seasons (2014–16) under new head coach Craig Bohl at the University of Wyoming in Laramie in the Mountain West Conference. He was a team captain and first-team all-conference as a senior, when the much-improved Cowboys played in the conference championship game and Poinsettia Bowl.

=== Statistics ===
Year	School	Conf	Class	Pos	G	Receiving			
Year	School	Conf	Class	Pos	G	Rec	Yds	Avg	TD
2014	Wyoming	MWC	SO	TE	8	17	244	14.4	2
2015	Wyoming	MWC	JR	TE	10	26	355	13.7	3
2016	Wyoming	MWC	SR	TE	12	32	515	16.1	7
Career	Wyoming				30	75	1,114	14.9	12

== Professional career ==
Pre-draft measurables
Height	Weight	Arm length	Hand span	Wingspan	40-yard dash	10-yard split	20-yard split	20-yard shuttle	Three-cone drill	Vertical jump	Broad jump
6 ft 3 5/8 in (1.92 m)	239 lb (108 kg)	30 7/8 in (0.78 m)	9 3/4 in (0.25 m)	6 ft 4 3/8 in (1.94 m)	4.64 s	1.62 s	2.70 s	4.34 s	7.12 s	36.5 in (0.93 m)	10 ft 1 in (3.07 m)
All values from Wyoming's Pro Day

=== New England Patriots ===
Not selected in the 2017 NFL draft, Hollister was soon signed by the New England Patriots on April 30 to a three-year, $1.67 million contract that included $90,000 guaranteed and a signing bonus of $10,000. The Patriots also signed his twin brother Cody as an undrafted free agent; they became the only active pair of twins on the same team in 2017 and the third set of twins to currently play in the NFL.

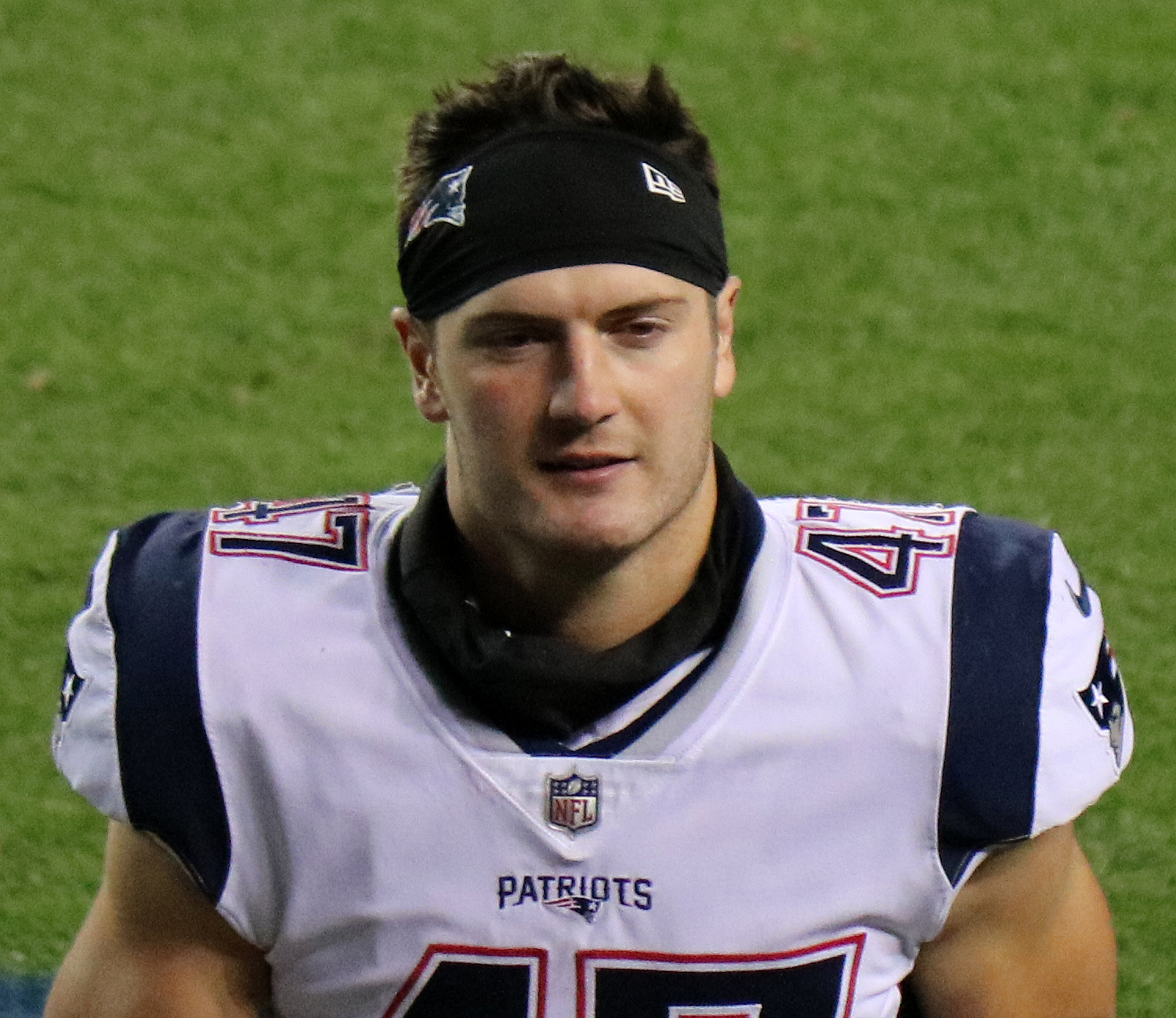
Hollister in 2017

In Week 1 of the 2017 preseason, Hollister caught seven passes for 116 yards against the Jacksonville Jaguars. Hollister put together a solid preseason performance while competing with James O'Shaughnessy for the Patriots possible third tight end spot behind veterans Rob Gronkowski and Dwayne Allen. Hollister ultimately won the spot as an undrafted rookie, and made his NFL debut in Week 2 against the New Orleans Saints, recording his first career catch, which went for seven yards. Hollister made it to Super Bowl LII, but the Patriots lost 41–33 to the Philadelphia Eagles.

Hollister entered the 2018 season as the third tight end on the depth chart, behind Gronkowski and Allen. He was limited to just eight games while dealing with hamstring and chest injuries, and was placed on injured reserve on January 8, 2019, prior to the Patriots' postseason. They reached Super Bowl LIII in February in Atlanta and defeated the Los Angeles Rams 13–3.

=== Seattle Seahawks (first stint) ===
On April 29, 2019, the Patriots traded Hollister to the Seattle Seahawks for a seventh-round pick in the 2020 draft. He was waived on August 31, 2019, then signed to the practice squad the next day. Six weeks later, he was promoted to the active roster on October 12. On November 3, he caught a 10-yard walk-off touchdown pass against the Tampa Bay Buccaneers in overtime to give the Seahawks the win, 40–34. Earlier in the same game, Hollister scored the first touchdown of his NFL career, a one-yard reception late in the first half, after drawing a pass interference penalty in the end zone. In Week 10 against the San Francisco 49ers, Hollister caught 8 passes for 62 yards and a touchdown in the 27–24 overtime win. During the last drive of Seattle's Week 17 rematch against the 49ers, Hollister made a critical fourth-down catch on the 1-yard line with Seattle trailing 26–21. However, he was tackled inches short of the goal line by rookie linebacker Dre Greenlaw, and Seattle turned the ball over to lose the game and the National Football Conference (NFC) West title. Overall, in the 2019 season, Hollister finished with 41 receptions for 349 receiving yards and three receiving touchdowns.

On March 16, 2020, the Seahawks placed a second-round restricted free agent tender on Hollister. He signed the one-year contract on April 21, 2020.

=== Buffalo Bills ===
On March 19, 2021, Hollister signed a contract with the Buffalo Bills for one year, reuniting him with his quarterback at Wyoming, Josh Allen.

Hollister was released by the Bills on August 31, 2021.

=== Jacksonville Jaguars ===
On September 3, 2021, Hollister signed with the Jacksonville Jaguars. He appeared in 7 games and had 9 receptions for 55 yards and a touchdown

=== Las Vegas Raiders (first stint) ===
Hollister signed with the Las Vegas Raiders on March 22, 2022. He was placed on injured reserve on August 30, 2022 and then, on September 2, 2022, he was released by the Raiders.

=== Minnesota Vikings ===
On September 27, 2022, Hollister signed with the Minnesota Vikings practice squad.

=== Las Vegas Raiders (second stint) ===
On November 11, 2022, Hollister was signed by the Raiders off the Vikings practice squad. He was released on December 17, 2022.

=== Seattle Seahawks (second stint) ===
On December 28, 2022, Hollister was signed to the Seahawks practice squad. His practice squad contract with the team expired after the season on January 14, 2023.

=== Las Vegas Raiders (third stint) ===
On August 2, 2023, Hollister signed with the Raiders. He was placed on injured reserve on August 27, and then released three days later with an injury settlement.

=== Carolina Panthers ===
On August 4, 2024, Hollister signed with the Carolina Panthers. He was released on August 27.

== Personal life ==
Jacob is the twin brother of Cody Hollister, a wide receiver who most recently played for the Tennessee Titans in the NFL.
