= Brian Hill (American football) =

American football player (born 1995)

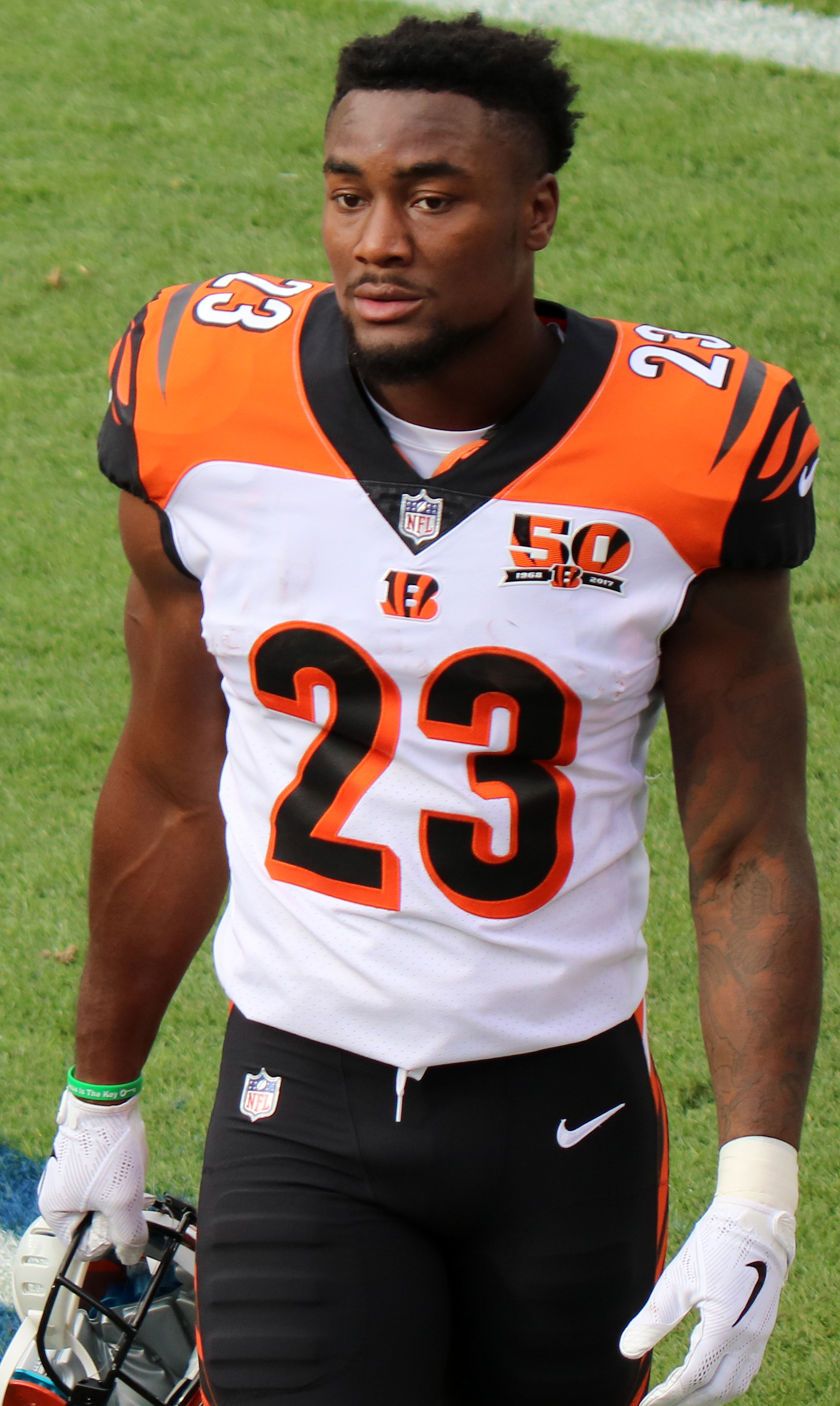
- Hill with the Cincinnati Bengals in 2017

No. 25, 23, 32, 35, 48
- Position: Running back

Personal information
- Born: November 9, 1995 (age 30); East St. Louis, Illinois, U.S.
- Listed height: 6 ft 1 in (1.85 m)
- Listed weight: 219 lb (99 kg)

Career information
- High school: Belleville West (Belleville, Illinois)
- College: Wyoming (2014–2016)
- NFL draft: 2017: 5th round, 156th overall pick

Career history
- Atlanta Falcons (2017); Cincinnati Bengals (2017); Atlanta Falcons (2018–2020); Tennessee Titans (2021)*; Cleveland Browns (2021); San Francisco 49ers (2021); BC Lions (2022)*; St. Louis BattleHawks (2023); San Francisco 49ers (2023)*
- * Offseason or practice squad member only

Awards and highlights
- First-team All-Mountain West (2016); Second-team All-Mountain West (2015)

Career NFL statistics
- Rushing yards: 982
- Rushing average: 4.7
- Rushing touchdowns: 3
- Receptions: 38
- Receiving yards: 313
- Receiving touchdowns: 1
- Stats at Pro Football Reference

Brian Hill (born November 9, 1995) is an American former professional football player who was a running back in the National Football League (NFL). Hill played college football for the Wyoming Cowboys, and he was selected by the Atlanta Falcons in the fifth round of the 2017 NFL draft. He has also played for the Cincinnati Bengals.

== Early life ==
Hill attended and played high school football at Belleville High School-West.

== College career ==
Hill attended and played college football at the University of Wyoming from 2014 to 2016.

As a freshman in 2014, he rushed for 796 yards and seven touchdowns. On November 1, 2014, against Fresno State, he had 23 carries for 281 rushing yards and two rushing touchdowns to go along with three receptions for 106 yards. As a sophomore, he had four games (Eastern Michigan, Appalachian State, Utah State, and UNLV) in which he rushed for over 200 yards. During the 2015 regular season, Hill had 1,631 rushing yards (seventh among Football Bowl Subdivision players) on 281 carries for an average of 5.8 yards per carry to go along with six rushing touchdowns. On November 18, 2015, Hill was named a finalist for the Doak Walker Award. He is Wyoming's first 1,000-yard rusher since 2008. He broke Ryan Christopherson's single-season Wyoming record of 1,455 yards set in 1994. On Saturday, October 22, 2016, at Nevada, Hill rushed for a career-high 289 yards and scored a career-high three touchdowns. Overall, he finished the 2016 season with 1,860 rushing yards and 22 rushing touchdowns.

=== Statistics ===
Season	Team	GP	GS	Rushing					Receiving		
Season	Team	GP	GS	Att	Yds	Avg	Lng	TD	Rec	Yds	TD
2014	Wyoming	11	0	145	796	5.5	89	7	13	204	0
2015	Wyoming	12	12	281	1,631	5.8	72	6	20	132	0
2016	Wyoming	14	13	349	1,860	5.3	66	22	8	67	0
Total		37	25	775	4,287	5.5	89	35	41	403	0

== Professional career ==
Pre-draft measurables
Height	Weight	Arm length	Hand span	40-yard dash	10-yard split	20-yard split	20-yard shuttle	Three-cone drill	Vertical jump	Broad jump	Bench press
6 ft 1 in (1.85 m)	219 lb (99 kg)	31 3/8 in (0.80 m)	8 7/8 in (0.23 m)	4.54 s	1.62 s	2.65 s	4.32 s	7.03 s	34 in (0.86 m)	10 ft 5 in (3.18 m)	15 reps
All values from NFL Combine

=== Atlanta Falcons (first stint) ===
Hill was selected by the Atlanta Falcons in the fifth round, 156th overall, in the 2017 NFL draft. He was the 16th running back selected in that year's draft, as well as one of 2 Wyoming players selected (the other being Chase Roullier). He was waived by the Falcons on October 14, 2017, and was re-signed to the practice squad.

=== Cincinnati Bengals ===
On November 14, 2017, Hill was signed by the Cincinnati Bengals off the Falcons' practice squad. He finished his rookie season with 11 carries for 37 yards to go along with two receptions for 36 yards.

On September 1, 2018, Hill was waived by the Bengals.

=== Atlanta Falcons (second stint) ===
On September 3, 2018, Hill was signed to the Falcons' practice squad. He was promoted to the active roster on September 11, 2018. In Week 16, against the Carolina Panthers, he had eight carries for 115 rushing yards. Overall, he finished the 2018 season with 20 carries for 157 rushing yards.

In the 2019 season, Hill appeared in 12 games and finished with 323 rushing yards and two rushing touchdowns to go along with 10 receptions for 69 receiving yards and one receiving touchdown.

On March 16, 2020, the Falcons placed an original-round restricted free agent tender on Hill. He signed the one-year contract on April 18, 2020. In Week 17 against the Tampa Bay Buccaneers, Hill recorded 136 yards from scrimmage during the 44–27 loss. In the 2020 season, Hill appeared in 16 games and started one. He finished with 100 carries for 465 rushing yards and one rushing touchdown to go along with 25 receptions for 199 receiving yards.

=== Tennessee Titans ===
On May 6, 2021, Hill signed with the Tennessee Titans. He was placed on injured reserve on August 29, 2021. He was released on September 2.

=== Cleveland Browns ===
Hill was signed to the Cleveland Browns' practice squad on November 9, 2021. Hill was elevated to the Browns' active roster on November 13, 2021. He was released on November 30.

=== San Francisco 49ers (first stint) ===
On December 8, 2021, Hill was signed to the San Francisco 49ers practice squad. He was promoted to the active roster on December 23. He was waived on January 1, 2022, and re-signed to the practice squad. He played in three games for the 49ers in the 2021 season. His contract expired when the team's season ended on January 30, 2022.

=== BC Lions ===
On June 20, 2022, Hill signed with the BC Lions of the Canadian Football League (CFL). He made the practice roster, but was eventually released on September 22, 2022.

=== St. Louis BattleHawks ===
Hill was selected by the St. Louis BattleHawks of the XFL in the sixth round of the 2023 XFL Skill Players Draft. He was released from his contract on August 21, 2023.

=== San Francisco 49ers (second stint) ===
On August 21, 2023, Hill signed with the San Francisco 49ers. He was released on August 29, 2023, and re-signed to the practice squad. Hill was released five days later.
