= Chase Roullier =

American football player (born 1993)

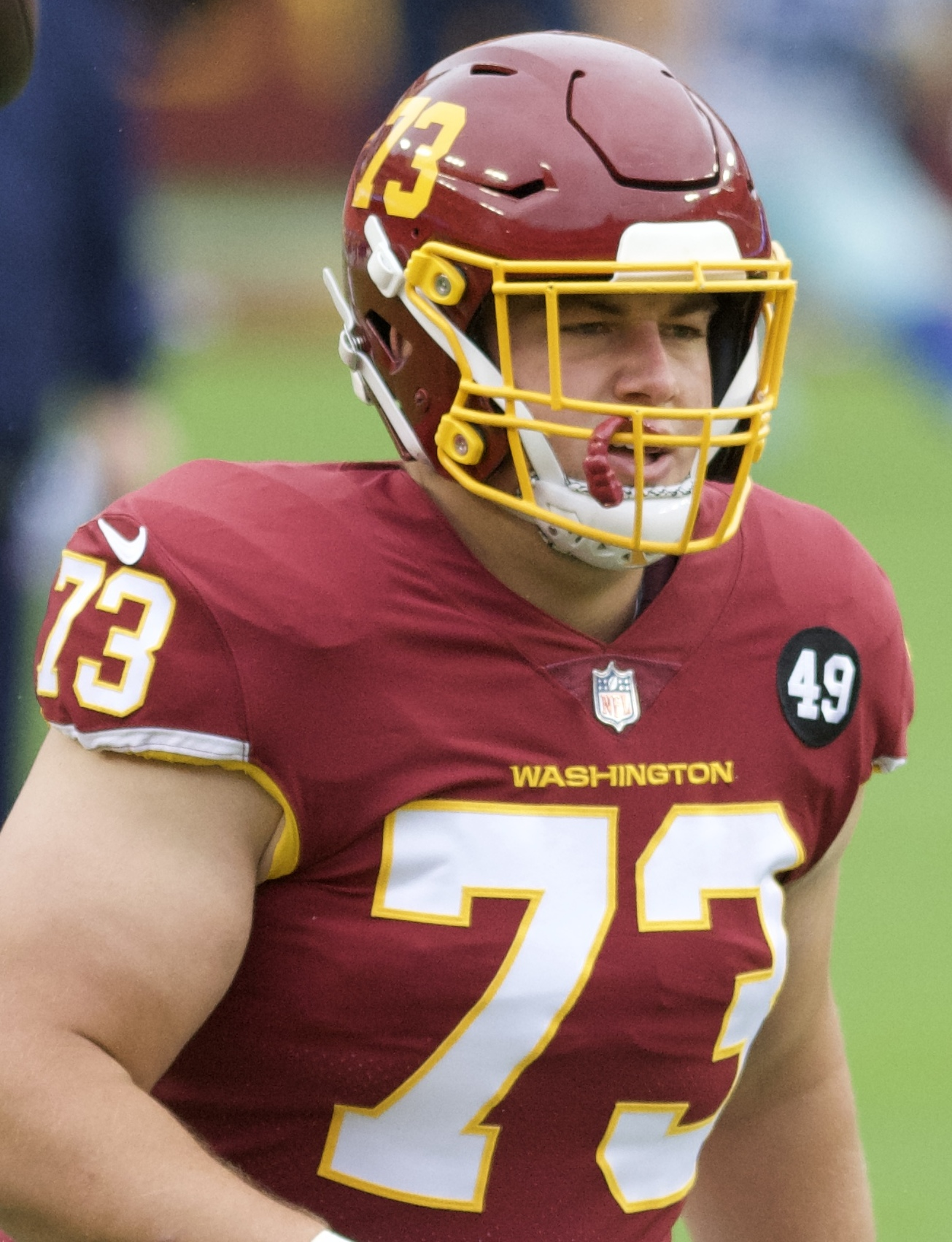
- Roullier with the Washington Football Team in 2020

No. 73
- Position: Center

Personal information
- Born: August 23, 1993 (age 33); Burnsville, Minnesota, U.S.
- Listed height: 6 ft 4 in (1.93 m)
- Listed weight: 312 lb (142 kg)

Career information
- High school: Burnsville
- College: Wyoming (2012–2016)
- NFL draft: 2017: 6th round, 199th overall pick

Career history
- Washington Redskins / Football Team / Commanders (2017–2022)

Awards and highlights
- First-team All-Mountain West (2016); Second-team All-Mountain West (2015)

Career NFL statistics
- Games played: 69
- Games started: 63
- Stats at Pro Football Reference

Chase Roullier (born August 23, 1993) is an American former professional football player who was a center for six seasons in the National Football League (NFL). He played college football for the Wyoming Cowboys and was selected by the Washington Redskins in the sixth round of the 2017 NFL draft. He spent his entire NFL career with Washington, playing for the Redskins, Football Team, and Commanders from 2017 through 2022, retiring after the 2022 season due to injuries.

== Early life and college ==
Roullier grew up in Burnsville, Minnesota. He was a three-year starter and two-time team captain for Burnsville High School, and was voted first-team all-state offensive lineman as a senior, as well as honorable mention all-state defensive lineman. Roullier was also a three-year letterman in basketball.

A 2-star offensive guard recruit, Roullier committed to Wyoming to play college football over offers from Akron, Northern Iowa, Toledo, and Western Michigan. Roullier redshirted as a freshman in 2012. In the 2013 season, he played both center and guard, appearing in 10 games with 3 starts. As a redshirt sophomore in 2014, Roullier started all 12 games at left guard and was named Honorable Mention All-Mountain West. Roullier again started all 12 games at left guard as a redshirt junior, garnering second-team All-Mountain West honors. He moved from left guard to center for his redshirt senior season, where he was named first-team All-Mountain West, helping lead Wyoming to the conference championship game.

== Professional career ==
Pre-draft measurables
Height	Weight	Arm length	Hand span	40-yard dash	10-yard split	20-yard split	20-yard shuttle	Three-cone drill	Vertical jump	Broad jump	Bench press
6 ft 3 5/8 in (1.92 m)	312 lb (142 kg)	32 1/4 in (0.82 m)	9 1/2 in (0.24 m)	5.54 s	1.93 s	3.22 s	4.47 s	7.60 s	26.5 in (0.67 m)	8 ft 1 in (2.46 m)	19 reps
All values from NFL Combine

Roullier was drafted by the Washington Redskins in the sixth round (199th overall) in the 2017 NFL draft. He played in 13 games as a rookie, starting seven at center while missing three due to a hand injury. Roullier started every game at center in 2018. Roullier started 14 games in 2019, missing two due to injury.

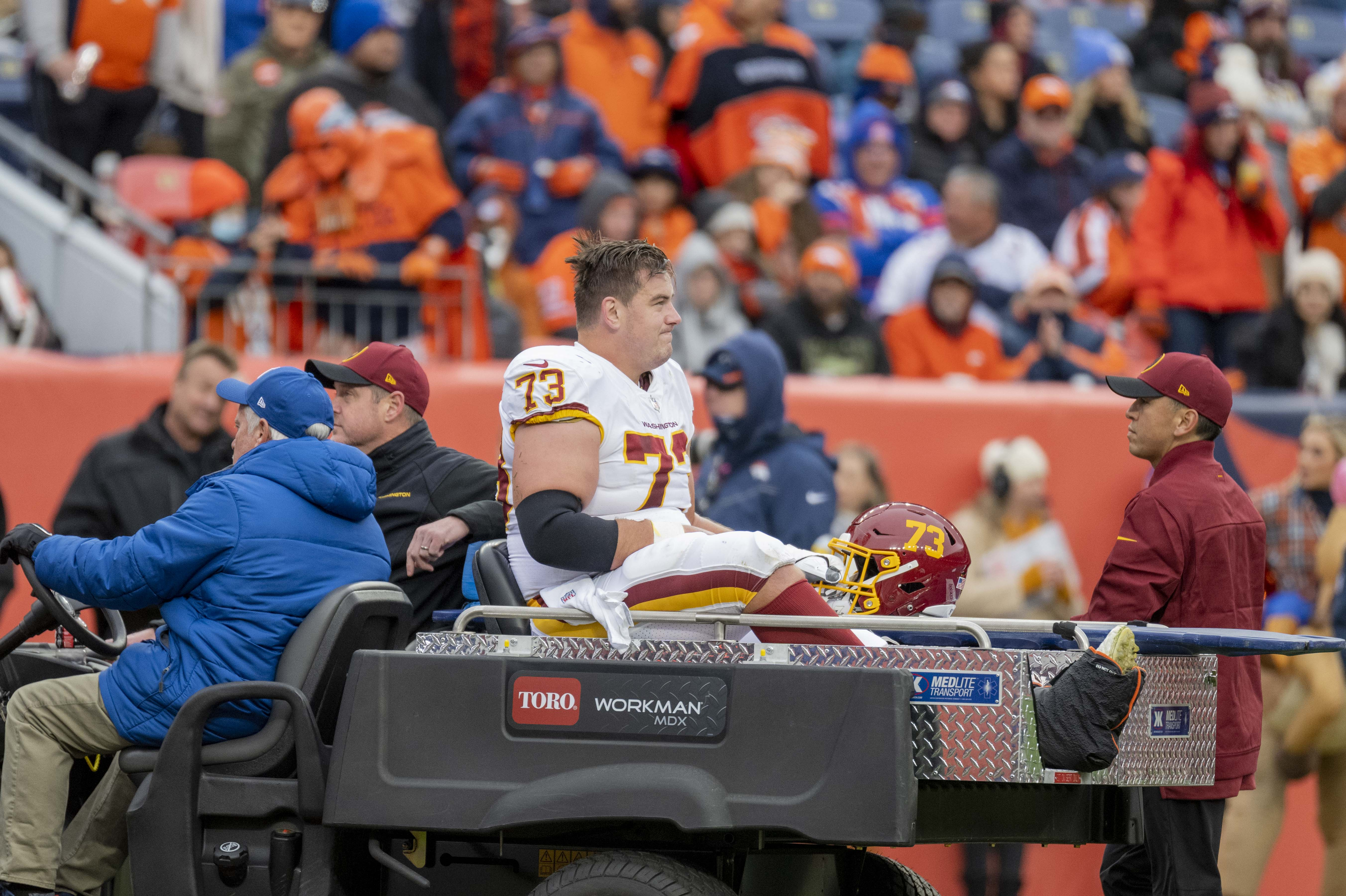
Roullier being carted off following a leg fracture, 2021

On January 2, 2021, Roullier signed a four-year contract extension worth $40.5 million. In the Week 8 game against the Denver Broncos, he was carted off the field after fracturing his fibula in the second quarter and was placed on injured reserve on November 2, 2021.

Roullier was on the active/physically unable to perform for the first day of training camp in 2022 before being activated the following day. He suffered a MCL tear in his right knee in Week 2 and was placed on injured reserve. Roullier was released by Washington on May 5, 2023.

On July 5, 2023, Roullier announced his retirement from professional football.
