= Tanner Gentry =

American gridiron football player (born 1994)

No. 19, 87
- Position: Wide receiver

Personal information
- Born: December 18, 1994 (age 31); Aurora, Colorado, U.S.
- Listed height: 6 ft 2 in (1.88 m)
- Listed weight: 209 lb (95 kg)

Career information
- High school: Grandview (Aurora)
- College: Wyoming
- NFL draft: 2017: undrafted

Career history
- Chicago Bears (2017–2018); New York Guardians (2020); Buffalo Bills (2020–2022)*; Toronto Argonauts (2023)*
- * Offseason or practice squad member only

Awards and highlights
- Second-team All-Mountain West (2016)

Career NFL statistics
- Receptions: 3
- Receiving yards: 35
- Stats at Pro Football Reference
- Stats at CFL.ca

Tanner Gentry (born December 18, 1994) is an American former gridiron football wide receiver. He played college football at Wyoming, and signed with the Chicago Bears as an undrafted free agent in 2017.

== Early life ==
Gentry played high school football at Grandview High School (Aurora, Colorado) where he was selected by The Denver Post to the All-Colorado team for all classifications and First Team All-State Class 5A as a wide receiver in 2012 as a Senior.

== College career ==
Coming out of high school, Gentry was ranked as the number 15 recruit in the state of Colorado by Rivals.com and 23rd in the state of Colorado by 247Sports.com.

In 2014, Gentry appeared in all 12 games with three starts receiving for 435 yards and two touchdowns for the Cowboys.

In 2015, Gentry appeared in only seven games before suffering a shoulder injury that sidelined him for the rest of the season. At the time of the injury, Gentry was leading the Mountain West in receiving yards.

In 2016, Gentry was selected to the 2016 All-Mountain West Second Team with 72 receptions for 1,326 yards and 14 touchdowns, marking the first time since 2005 that a Cowboy receiver had 1,000 receiving yards in a single season. He was quarterback Josh Allen's top target that year.

== Professional career ==
Pre-draft measurables
Height	Weight	Arm length	Hand span	40-yard dash	10-yard split	20-yard split	20-yard shuttle	Three-cone drill	Vertical jump	Broad jump	Bench press
6 ft 1 in (1.85 m)	208 lb (94 kg)	30 1/2 in (0.77 m)	9 7/8 in (0.25 m)	4.58 s	1.68 s	2.68 s	4.43 s	7.29 s	38.0 in (0.97 m)	10 ft 3 in (3.12 m)	19 reps
All values from Pro Day

=== Chicago Bears ===
Gentry signed with the Chicago Bears as an undrafted free agent on May 11, 2017. He was waived on September 2, and was signed to the Bears' practice squad the next day. On September 12, Gentry was promoted to the active roster. On September 17, in the 29–7 loss to the Tampa Bay Buccaneers, Gentry had two receptions for 27 yards in his NFL debut in Week 2. He was waived on September 19, and was re-signed to the Bears' practice squad the next day. Gentry was promoted back to the active roster on October 11. He was waived on November 11, and was re-signed to the practice squad. Gentry signed a reserve/future contract with the Bears on January 1, 2018.

On September 1, 2018, Gentry was waived by the Bears and was signed to the team's practice squad the next day. He signed a reserve/future contract with the Bears on January 8, 2019.

On August 31, 2019, Gentry was waived by the Bears.

=== New York Guardians ===
On October 21, 2019, Gentry was selected by the New York Guardians in the third round of the 2020 XFL draft. He was placed on injured reserve before the start of the season on January 21, 2020. Gentry was activated from injured reserve on February 26. He had his contract terminated when the league suspended operations on April 10.

=== Buffalo Bills ===
On January 4, 2021, Gentry was signed to the Buffalo Bills' practice squad. The move reunited Gentry with his former Wyoming teammates Josh Allen and Jacob Hollister. On January 26, Gentry signed a reserves/futures contract with the Bills.

On August 31, 2021, Gentry was released from the Bills and re-signed to the practice squad the next day. After the Bills were eliminated in the Divisional Round of the 2021 playoffs, he signed a reserve/future contract on January 24, 2022.

On August 30, 2022, Gentry was waived by the Bills and re-signed to the practice squad the next day. He was released on January 17, 2023.

=== Toronto Argonauts ===
On February 21, 2023, it was announced that Gentry had been signed by the Toronto Argonauts.
