= 2015 Mountain West Conference football season =

- League: NCAA Division I FBS (Football Bowl Subdivision)
- Sport: Football
- Duration: August 2015–January 2016
- Teams: 12
- TV partner(s): CBS Sports Network, ABC, ESPN, ESPN2, ESPNU, CBS

2016 NFL Draft
- Top draft pick: LB Kamalei Correa, Boise State
- Picked by: Baltimore Ravens, 42nd overall

Regular season
- Mountain Division champions: Air Force Falcons
- Mountain Division runners-up: Boise State Broncos
- West Division champions: San Diego State Aztecs
- West Division runners-up: Nevada Wolfpack

Football seasons
- 2014 2016

2015 Mountain West Conference football standings
	Conf.			Overall
Team	W		L	W		L
Mountain Division
Air Force x	6	–	2	8	–	6
New Mexico	5	–	3	7	–	6
Utah State	5	–	3	6	–	7
Boise State	5	–	3	9	–	4
Colorado State	5	–	3	7	–	6
Wyoming	2	–	6	2	–	10
West Division
San Diego State x$	8	–	0	11	–	3
Nevada	4	–	4	7	–	6
San Jose State	4	–	4	6	–	7
Fresno State	2	–	6	3	–	9
UNLV	2	–	6	3	–	9
Hawaii	0	–	8	3	–	10
Championship: San Diego State 27, Air Force 24
$ – Conference champion; x – Division champion/co-champions; Rankings from AP Poll

The 2015 Mountain West Conference football season was the 17th season of college football for the Mountain West Conference (MW). In the 2015 NCAA Division I FBS football season, the MW had 12 football members: Air Force, Boise State, Colorado State, Fresno State, Hawaii, Nevada, New Mexico, San Diego State, San Jose State, UNLV, Utah State, and Wyoming.

== Preseason ==
=== Mountain West Media ===
2015 Mountain West Media Day was held at The Cosmopolitan in Las Vegas on July 28, 2015.

==== Preseason polls ====
Place	Mountain Division	West Division
1	Boise State (28) 177	San Diego State (27) 177
2	Utah State (2) 150	Fresno State (3) 141
3	Colorado State 108	Nevada 113
4	Air Force 90	San Jose State 91
5	Wyoming 64	Hawai'i 70
6	New Mexico 41	UNLV 38

- Predicted Mountain West Championship Game Winner: Boise State is picked to win the Mountain West title game over San Diego State.

=== Preseason All-Mountain West Teams ===
Offense
Position	Player	Class	Team
QB	Chuckie Keeton	SR	Utah State
RB	Donnel Pumphrey*	JR	San Diego State
RB	Marteze Waller**	SR	Fresno State
WR	Rashard Higgins*	JR	Colorado State
WR	Devonte Boyd**	SO	UNLV
TE	Steven Walker*	SR	Colorado State
OL	Marcus Henry*	SR	Boise State
OL	Rees Odhiambo**	SR	Boise State
OL	Alex Fifita	SR	Fresno State
OL	Ben Clarke	SR	Hawai'i
OL	Pearce Slater	SR	San Diego State

Defense
Position	Player	Class	Team
DL	Alex Hansen**	SR	Air Force
DL	Kamalei Correa*	JR	Boise State
DL	Ian Seau**	SR	Nevada
DL	Eddie Yarbrough*	SR	Wyoming
LB	Tanner Vallejo**	JR	Boise State
LB	Kyler Fackrell	SR	Utah State
LB	Nick Vigil*	JR	Utah State
DB	Weston Steelhammer*	JR	Air Force
DB	Donte Deayon**	SR	Boise State
DB	Darian Thompson*	SR	Boise State
DB	Damontae Kazee**	JR	San Diego State

Specialists
Position	Player	Class	Team
P	Alex Boy**	SR	Nevada
PK	Donny Hageman	SR	San Diego State
Ret.	Carlos Wiggins	SR	New Mexico

- Preseason Offensive Player of the Year:

Rashard Higgins, Jr., WR, Colorado State

- Preseason Defensive Player of the Year:

Kyler Fackrell, Sr., LB, Utah State

- Preseason Special Teams Player of the Year:

Donny Hageman Sr., PK, San Diego State

(* - member of the 2014 All-Mountain West first team)

(** - member of the 2014 All-Mountain West second team)

=== Award watch lists ===
The following Mountain West players were named to preseason award watch lists.

Maxwell Award:

- Rashard Higgins–Colorado State
- Chuckie Keeton–Utah State
- Donnel Pumphrey–San Diego State

Chuck Bednarik Award:

- Kamalei Correa–Boise State
- Kyler Fackrell–Utah State
- Darian Thompson–Boise State

John Mackey Award:

- Kivon Cartwright–Colorado State
- Billy Freeman–San Jose State
- Jarred Gipson–Nevada
- Jake Phillips–UNLV
- Steven Walker–Colorado State

Fred Biletnikoff Award:

- Devonte Boyd–UNLV
- Rashard Higgins–Colorado State
- Jalen Robinette–Air Force
- Hunter Sharp–Utah State
- Thomas Sperbeck–Boise State

Bronko Nagurski Trophy:

- Kamalei Correa–Boise State
- Kyler Fackrell–Utah State
- Ian Seau–Nevada
- Darian Thompson–Boise State

Outland Trophy:

- Austin Corbett–Nevada
- Marcus Henry–Boise State

Jim Thorpe Award:

- Donte Deayon–Boise State
- Damontae Kazee–San Diego State
- Trent Matthews–Colorado State
- Weston Steelhammer–Air Force
- Darian Thompson–Boise State
- JJ Whitaker–San Diego State

Lombardi Award:

- Kamalei Correa–Boise State
- Marcus Henry–Boise State
- Rees Odhiambo–Boise State
- Tanner Vallejo–Boise State
- Ben Clarke–Hawai'i
- Ian Seau–Nevada
- Alex Barrett–San Diego State
- Darrell Greene–San Diego State
- Pearce Slater–San Diego State
- Christian Tago–San Diego State
- Nick Vigil–Utah State
- Kyler Fackrell–Utah State
- Eddie Yarbrough–Wyoming

Rimington Trophy:

- Bo Bonnheim–Fresno State
- Austin Stephens–Utah State
- Marcus Henry–Boise State

Davey O'Brien Award:

- Chuckie Keeton–Utah State

Doak Walker Award:

- Tyler Ervin–San Jose State
- Brian Hill–Wyoming
- Marteze Waller–Fresno State
- Shaun Wick–Wyoming
- LaJuan Hunt–Utah State
- Don Jackson–Nevada
- Donnel Pumphrey–San Diego State

Walter Camp Award:

- Rashard Higgins–Colorado State
- Darian Thompson–Boise State

Lott Trophy:

- Calvin Munson–San Diego State
- Weston Steelhammer–Air Force

Lou Groza Award:

- Donny Hageman–San Diego State

== Coaches ==
NOTE: Stats shown are before the beginning of the season

Team	Head coach	Years at school	Overall record	Record at school	MW record
Air Force	Troy Calhoun	9	59–44	59–44	34–30
Boise State	Bryan Harsin	2	19–7	12–2	7–1
Colorado State	Mike Bobo	1	1–0	1–0	0-0
Fresno State	Tim DeRuyter	4	27–14	26–14	19–5
Hawaiʻi	Norm Chow	4	8-29	8-29	4-20
Nevada	Brian Polian	3	11-14	11-14	7-9
New Mexico	Bob Davie	4	46-51	11-26	4-20
San Diego State	Rocky Long	4	97–89	32-20	22–9
San José State	Ron Caragher	3	53-37	9-15	7-9
UNLV	Tony Sanchez	1	0–1	0–1	0–0
Utah State	Matt Wells	3	19-9	19-9	13-3
Wyoming	Craig Bohl	2	108–40	4–8	2–6

*first year as conference member, ^achieved as head coach of New Mexico from 99 to 08

== Rankings ==
Legend
	Increase in ranking
	Decrease in ranking
	Unranked the previous week
RV	Received votes but were not ranked in Top 25 of poll

		Pre	Wk 2	Wk 3	Wk 4	Wk 5	Wk 6	Wk 7	Wk 8	Wk 9	Wk 10	Wk 11	Wk 12	Wk 13	Wk 14	Wk 15	Final
Air Force	AP												RV	RV			
Air Force	C	RV												RV			
Air Force	CFP	Not released															
Boise State	AP	23	20	RV	RV	RV	25	21	RV		RV	RV					
Boise State	C	24	22	RV	RV	RV	24	20	RV	RV	RV	RV					
Boise State	CFP	Not released															
Colorado State	AP																
Colorado State	C																
Colorado State	CFP	Not released															
Fresno State	AP																
Fresno State	C																
Fresno State	CFP	Not released															
Hawaiʻi	AP																
Hawaiʻi	C																
Hawaiʻi	CFP	Not released															
Nevada	AP																
Nevada	C																
Nevada	CFP	Not released															
New Mexico	AP																
New Mexico	C																
New Mexico	CFP	Not released															
San Diego State	AP														RV	RV	RV
San Diego State	C													RV	RV	RV	RV
San Diego State	CFP	Not released															
San José State	AP																
San José State	C																
San José State	CFP	Not released															
UNLV	AP																
UNLV	C																
UNLV	CFP	Not released															
Utah State	AP								RV								
Utah State	C	RV							RV								
Utah State	CFP	Not released															
Wyoming	AP																
Wyoming	C																
Wyoming	CFP	Not released															

Legend
	Increase in ranking
	Decrease in ranking
	Unranked the previous week
RV	Received votes but were not ranked in Top 25 of poll

== Schedule ==
=== Championship game ===
The championship game was played on December 5, 2015. It featured the Air Force Falcons, champions of the Mountain Division, and the San Diego State Aztecs, champions of the West Division. The game was played at Qualcomm Stadium in front of 20,959. San Diego State won the game 27–24 to claim their first outright conference championship since 1986, and their first ever outright Mountain West Conference championship.

=== Bowl games ===
Bowl Game	Date	Stadium	City	Television	Team Matchups	Winning team	Score	Losing team	Score
New Mexico Bowl	December 19	University Stadium	Albuquerque	ESPN	Arizona vs. New Mexico	Arizona	45	New Mexico	37
Cure Bowl	December 19	Orlando Citrus Bowl	Orlando	CBSSN	San Jose State vs. Georgia State	San Jose State	27	Georgia State	16
Famous Idaho Potato Bowl	December 22	Albertsons Stadium	Boise	ESPN	Akron vs. Utah State	Akron	23	Utah State	21
Poinsettia Bowl	December 23	Qualcomm Stadium	San Diego	ESPN	Boise State vs. Northern Illinois	Boise State	55	Northern Illinois	7
Hawai'i Bowl	December 24	Aloha Stadium	Honolulu	ESPN	San Diego State vs. Cincinnati	San Diego State	42	Cincinnati	7
Armed Forces Bowl	December 29	Amon G. Carter Stadium	Fort Worth	ESPN	California vs. Air Force	California	55	Air Force	36
Arizona Bowl	December 29	Arizona Stadium	Tucson	ASN	Nevada vs. Colorado State	Nevada	28	Colorado State	23

== Mountain West vs Power Conference matchups ==
=== Records against other conferences ===
2015 records against non-conference foes:

Regular season

Power 5 Conferences	Record
ACC	1–0
Big Ten	0–6
Big 12	0–0
Pac-12	2–10
SEC	0–3
Notre Dame	0–0
Power 5 Total	3–19
Other FBS Conferences	Record
American	0–2
C-USA	1–0
MAC	1–2
Sun Belt	1–2
Independents (Excluding Notre Dame)	1–2
Other FBS Total	5–10
FCS Opponents	Record
Football Championship Subdivision	11–1
Total Non-Conference Record	19–30

Post Season

Power Conferences	Record
Pac-12	0–2
Power 5 Total	0–2
Other FBS Conferences	Record
American	1–0
MAC	1–1
Sun Belt	1–0
Total Bowl Record	4–4

== Awards and honors ==
=== All Conference teams ===
- Offensive Player of the Year: Donnel Pumphrey, JR., RB, San Diego State
- Defensive Player of the Year: Damontae Kazee, JR., DB, San Diego State
- Special Teams Player of the Year: Rashaad Penny, SO., RS, San Diego State
- Freshman of the Year: Brett Rypien, QB, Boise State
- Coach of the Year: Rocky Long, San Diego State

Offense:

Pos.	Name	Yr.	School	Name	Yr.	School
First Team				Second Team		
QB	Brett Rypien	FR.	Boise State	Nick Stevens	SO.	Colorado State
WR	Thomas Sperbeck	JR.	Boise State	Devonte Boyd**	SO.	UNLV
WR	Rashard Higgins*	JR.	Colorado State	Hunter Sharp	SR.	Utah State
RB	Donnel Pumphrey*	JR.	San Diego State	Jeremy McNichols	SO.	Boise State
RB	Tyler Ervin	SR.	San Jose State	Brian Hill	SO.	Wyoming
TE	Billy Freeman	JR.	San Jose State	Jake Roh	SO.	Boise State
OL	Sevrin Remmo	SR.	Air Force	A.J. Ruechel	SR.	Air Force
OL	Marcus Henry	SR.	Boise State	Fred Zerblis	JR.	Colorado State
OL	Rees Odhiambo	SR.	Boise State	Alex Fifita	SR.	Fresno State
OL	Nico Siragusa	JR.	San Diego State	Wes Schweitzer	SR.	San Jose State
OL	Pearce Slater	SR.	San Diego State	Chase Roullier	JR.	Wyoming
PK	Tyler Rausa	JR.	Boise State	Brent Zuzo	JR.	Nevada
PR/KR	Rashaad Penny	SO.	San Diego State	Carlos Wiggins	SR.	New Mexico

Defense:

Pos.	Name	Yr.	School	Name	Yr.	School
First Team				Second Team		
DL	Alex Hansen	SR.	Air Force	Kamalei Correa	JR.	Boise State
DL	Kennedy Tulimasealii	JR.	Hawai'i	Cory James	SR.	Colorado State
DL	Ian Seau	SR.	Nevada	Lenny Jones	SR.	Nevada
DL	Alex Barrett	JR.	San Diego State	Eddie Yarbrough	SR.	Wyoming
LB	Calvin Munson	JR.	San Diego State	Ejiro Ederaine**	SR.	Fresno State
LB	Kyler Fackrell	SR.	Utah State	Jake Fely**	SR.	San Diego State
LB	Nick Vigil*	JR.	Utah State	Christian Tago	JR.	San Jose State
DB	Roland Ladipo	JR.	Air Force	Donte Deayon***	SR.	Boise State
DB	Weston Steelhammer*	JR.	Air Force	Dameon Baber	FR.	Nevada
DB	Darian Thompson*	SR.	Boise State	J.J. Whittaker**	SR.	San Diego State
DB	Damontae Kazee	JR.	San Diego State	Andrew Wingard	FR.	Wyoming
P	Michael Carrizosa	SO.	San Jose State	Hayden Hunt	JR.	Colorado State

(* - Two-Time First-Team Selection)
(** - Two-Time Second-Team Selection)
(*** - Three-Time Second-Team Selection)

=== All-Academic ===
Name	School	Yr.	GPA	Major
Claude Alexander	Air Force	Junior	3.24	Operations Research
Cody Apfel	Air Force	Senior	3.20	Geospatial Science
Samuel Byers	Air Force	Junior	3.00	Business
Allen Caunitz	Air Force	Junior	3.20	Civil Engineering
Andrew Gikas	Air Force	Junior	3.19	Operations Research
Alexander Hansen	Air Force	Senior	3.21	Operations Research
Jacob Onyechi	Air Force	Junior	3.01	Mechanical Engineering
Sevrin Remmo	Air Force	Senior	3.13	Business
Karson Roberts	Air Force	Senior	3.42	Mechanical Engineering
A.J. Ruechel	Air Force	Senior	3.51	Mechanical Engineering
Luke Strebel	Air Force	Sophomore	3.34	Systems Engineering
Robert Ash	Boise State	Senior	3.38	Organization Performance
Steven Baggett	Boise State	Junior	3.80	Construction Business
Kellen Buhr	Boise State	Junior	3.54	Supply Chain Business
Alec Dhaenens	Boise State	Sophomore	3.25	Entrepreneurial Business
Jerhen Ertel	Boise State	Senior	3.16	Applied Mathematics
Jack Fields	Boise State	Senior	3.41	Criminal Justice
Mason Hampton	Boise State	Sophomore	3.96	Accounting
Jake Hardee	Boise State	Senior	3.62	Criminal Justice
Marcus Henry	Boise State	Senior	3.11	Business
Tyler Horn	Boise State	Senior	3.00	Communication
Tyler Horton	Boise State	Freshman	3.26	Undeclared
Kevin Keane	Boise State	Senior	3.00	Business
Darren Lee	Boise State	Junior	3.50	Criminal Justice
Tutulupeatau Mataele	Boise State	Senior	3.40	Communication
Sam McCaskill	Boise State	Junior	3.25	Supply Chain Business
Durrant Miles	Boise State	Freshman	3.12	Undeclared
Rees Odhiambo	Boise State	Senior	3.18	Kinesiology
A.J. Richardson	Boise State	Sophomore	3.08	Communication
Jake Roh	Boise State	Sophomore	3.31	Business
Brett Rypien	Boise State	Freshman	3.68	Undeclared
Thomas Sperbeck	Boise State	Junior	3.37	Business
Thomas Stuart	Boise State	Junior	3.12	Communication
Leighton Vander Esch	Boise State	Sophomore	3.31	Business
Sean Wale	Boise State	Junior	3.83	Health Science
Ben Weaver	Boise State	Junior	3.35	Business
Shane Williams-Rhodes	Boise State	Senior	3.08	Business
Ryan Wolpin	Boise State	Sophomore	3.23	Communication
Mario Yakoo	Boise State	Junior	3.34	Communication
Cory Young	Boise State	Sophomore	3.18	Business
Kelsey Young	Boise State	Senior	4.00	Business Administration
Cole Anderson	Colorado State	Senior	3.02	Business
Wyatt Bryan	Colorado State	Freshman	3.68	Mechanical Engineering
Patrick Elsenbast	Colorado State	Sophomore	3.40	History
Hayden Hunt	Colorado State	Junior	3.16	Political Science
Izzy Matthews	Colorado State	Freshman	3.11	Undeclared
Colby Meeks	Colorado State	Freshman	3.01	Business
SteveO Michel	Colorado State	Senior	3.20	Social Work
Kevin Nutt Jr.	Colorado State	Sophomore	3.02	Communication Studies
Nolan Peralta	Colorado State	Junior	3.62	Biological Science
Trent Sieg	Colorado State	Sophomore	3.01	Mechanical Engineering
Nick Stevens	Colorado State	Sophomore	3.08	Business
Kilton Anderson	Fresno State	Freshman	3.76	Pre–Business
Bo Bonnheim	Fresno State	Senior	3.20	Animal Sciences
Dylan Detwiler	Fresno State	Senior	3.45	Criminology
George Helmuth	Fresno State	Freshman	3.12	Agricultural Business
Kyle Hendrickson	Fresno State	Freshman	3.79	Communications
Brandon Hughes	Fresno State	Junior	3.49	Business
Kody Kroening	Fresno State	Sophomore	3.34	Pre–Business
Michael Martens	Fresno State	Junior	3.49	Bus Ad–Business
Malique Micenheimer	Fresno State	Senior	4.00	Kinesiology
Justin Northern	Fresno State	Senior	3.79	Mechanical Engineering
Kyrian Obidiegwu	Fresno State	Senior	3.67	Health Sciences
Chad Olsen	Fresno State	Sophomore	3.00	Pre–Athletic Training
David Patterson	Fresno State	Sophomore	3.25	Business
Tyler Puccio	Fresno State	Freshman	3.41	Pre–Business
Kyle Riddering	Fresno State	Freshman	3.02	Construction Business
Garrett Swanson	Fresno State	Senior	3.51	Kinesiology
David Tangipa	Fresno State	Freshman	3.29	Political Science
Jacob Vazquez	Fresno State	Junior	4.00	Agricultural Business
Charles Washington	Fresno State	Senior	3.11	Criminology
Isaiah Bernard	Hawai'i	Junior	3.07	Sociology
Noah Borden	Hawai'i	Freshman	3.67	Undeclared
Duke Bukoski	Hawai'i	Senior	3.01	Family Resources
Makoa Camanse–Stevens	Hawai'i	Junior	3.86	Political Science
Ben Clarke	Hawai'i	Senior	3.62	Biology
Keelan Ewaliko	Hawai'i	Junior	3.08	Family Resources
Penitito Faalologo	Hawai'i	Senior	3.08	Family Resources
Davasyia Hagger	Hawai'i	Junior	3.14	Economics
Marrell Jackson	Hawai'i	Senior	3.17	Family Resources
Pereese Joas	Hawai'i	Senior	3.01	Business
Meffy Koloamatangi	Hawai'i	Junior	3.05	Communication
Leo Koloamatangi	Hawai'i	Senior	3.19	Business
Eperone Moananu	Hawai'i	Freshman	3.00	Undeclared
Harold Moleni	Hawai'i	Senior	3.76	Business
Jason Muraoka	Hawai'i	Senior	3.29	Sociology
Bordie Nakama	Hawai'i	Senior	3.28	Kinesiology
Damien Packer	Hawai'i	Senior	3.00	Family Resources
Ryan Pasoquen	Hawai'i	Senior	3.08	Communication
Kory Rasmussen	Hawai'i	Senior	3.25	Communication and Sociology
Ikaika Woolsey	Hawai'i	Senior	3.25	Family Resources
Dameon Baber	Nevada	Freshman	3.24	Business
Alex Bertrando	Nevada	Junior	3.20	Criminal Justice
James Butler	Nevada	Sophomore	3.07	Communications
Shane Cannon	Nevada	Sophomore	3.05	Business
Colton Concellos	Nevada	Sophomore	3.07	Public Health
Austin Corbett	Nevada	Sophomore	3.39	Kinesiology
Jordan Dobrich	Nevada	Senior	3.85	Mechanical Engineering
Don Jackson	Nevada	Senior	3.25	Education
Lenny Jones	Nevada	Senior	3.10	Education
Adam Khouri	Nevada	Sophomore	3.46	Political Science
Jake Lacaden	Nevada	Freshman	3.41	Public Health
Bryan Lane	Nevada	Senior	3.20	Education
Jeremy Macauley	Nevada	Junior	3.31	Business
Kalei Meyer	Nevada	Freshman	3.58	Mechanical Engineering
Ahki Muhammad	Nevada	Freshman	3.23	Public Health
Malik Reed	Nevada	Freshman	3.26	Biology
Korey Rush	Nevada	Freshman	3.17	Communications
Tyler Stewart	Nevada	Senior	3.15	Communications
Trevor Taft	Nevada	Senior	3.50	Education
Lucas Weber	Nevada	Freshman	3.38	Public Health
Brent Zuzo	Nevada	Junior	3.30	Business
Garrett Adcock	New Mexico	Senior	3.25	Law
Austin Apodaca	New Mexico	Senior	3.50	Liberal Arts
Ricky Bennett	New Mexico	Senior	3.05	Business
Dakota Cox	New Mexico	Senior	3.29	Business
Chris Davis Jr.	New Mexico	Sophomore	3.00	Secondary Educations
Travis Green	New Mexico	Senior	3.00	Physical Education
Alex Hart	New Mexico	Freshman	3.81	Business
Delane Hart–Johnson	New Mexico	Sophomore	3.00	Liberal Arts
Daniel Henry	New Mexico	Senior	3.19	Business
Aaron Jenkins	New Mexico	Sophomore	3.13	Liberal Arts
Nick Lehman	New Mexico	Junior	3.09	Liberal Arts
Eden Mahina	New Mexico	Senior	3.22	Communication
Kene Okonkwo	New Mexico	Sophomore	3.39	Business
Zack Rogers	New Mexico	Senior	3.19	Liberal Arts
Steven Romero	New Mexico	Senior	3.20	Psychology
Killon Romine	New Mexico	Senior	3.33	Business
Jake Rothschiller	New Mexico	Junior	3.13	Liberal Arts
Jason Sanders	New Mexico	Sophomore	3.11	Liberal Arts
Reece White	New Mexico	Senior	3.45	Business
Daniel Brunskill	San Diego State	Junior	3.06	Civil Engineering
Luke Bussey	San Diego State	Freshman	3.72	Business
Christian Cumberlander	San Diego State	Sophomore	3.00	Communication
Arthur Flores	San Diego State	Junior	3.31	Computer Science
Lloyd Mills	San Diego State	Junior	3.35	Homeland Security
Jeff Overbaugh	San Diego State	Senior	3.66	Liberal Arts
Paul Pitts III	San Diego State	Senior	3.80	Liberal Arts
Pierre Romain	San Diego State	Senior	3.49	Criminal Justice
Maxwell Smith	San Diego State	Senior	3.47	Homeland Security
David Wells	San Diego State	Sophomore	3.08	Communication
J.J. Whittaker	San Diego State	Senior	3.51	Homeland Security
Mark Amann	San Jose State	Junior	3.13	Business
Tim Crawley	San Jose State	Junior	3.81	Business
Loni Fa	San Jose State	Junior	3.60	Recreation Business
Frank Ginda	San Jose State	Freshman	3.54	Business
Chris Gonzalez	San Jose State	Sophomore	3.21	Business
Chandler Hawkins	San Jose State	Freshman	3.14	Kinesiology
Jeremy Kelly	San Jose State	Freshman	3.14	Communication Studies
Jarrod Lawson	San Jose State	Junior	3.18	Communication Studies
Alex Manigo	San Jose State	Junior	3.38	Business
Josh Oliver	San Jose State	Freshman	3.54	Business
Malik Roberson	San Jose State	Freshman	3.82	Undeclared
Evan Sarver	San Jose State	Junior	3.15	Mechanical Engineering
Wes Schweitzer	San Jose State	Senior	3.38	Biochemistry
Shane Smith	San Jose State	Junior	3.26	Business
Nate Velichko	San Jose State	Sophomore	3.65	Kinesiology
Nicolai Bornand	UNLV	Junior	3.08	Public Administration
Blake Decker	UNLV	Senior	3.37	Business
Mike Hughes Jr.	UNLV	Sophomore	3.20	Criminal Justice
Will Kreitler	UNLV	Junior	3.15	Business
Kurt Palandech	UNLV	Junior	3.55	Business
Andrew Price	UNLV	Junior	3.36	Kinesiology
J'Ondray Sanders	UNLV	Sophomore	3.33	Criminal Justice
Kyle Saxelid	UNLV	Sophomore	3.01	Business
Anthony Williams	UNLV	Senior	3.04	Criminal Justice
Jarom Baldomero	Utah State	Senior	3.36	Accounting
Chris Copier	Utah State	Senior	3.03	Business
Aaron Dalton	Utah State	Sophomore	3.07	Exercise Science
Edmund Fa'imalo	Utah State	Senior	3.31	Interdisciplinary Studies
Salanoa Galea'i	Utah State	Senior	3.19	Exercise Science
Daniel Gray	Utah State	Senior	3.08	Sociology
DeShane Hines	Utah State	Senior	3.44	Sociology
Landon Horne	Utah State	Senior	3.48	Business
Wyatt Houston	Utah State	Senior	3.43	Sociology
Derek Larsen	Utah State	Sophomore	3.07	Business
DJ Nelson	Utah State	Sophomore	3.42	Business
Jordan Nielsen	Utah State	Senior	3.24	Biology
Michael Okonkwo	Utah State	Senior	3.55	Business
Jentz Painter	Utah State	Senior	3.05	Exercise Science
Jontrell Rocquemore	Utah State	Sophomore	3.22	Exploratory
Siua Taufa	Utah State	Senior	3.20	Sociology
Zach Van Leeuwen	Utah State	Sophomore	3.30	Family, Consumer & Human Development
Brock Warren	Utah State	Senior	3.08	Sociology
Ben Wysocki	Utah State	Senior	3.50	Physical Education
Luis Bach	Wyoming	Freshman	3.56	Kinesiology
Cameron Coffman	Wyoming	Senior	3.27	Social Science
Jacob English	Wyoming	Junior	3.21	Kinesiology
Nico Evans	Wyoming	Freshman	3.10	Communication
Dalton Fields	Wyoming	Sophomore	3.10	Kinesiology
Carl Granderson	Wyoming	Freshman	3.20	Psychology
Josh Harshman	Wyoming	Freshman	3.09	Undeclared
Tim Kamana	Wyoming	Sophomore	3.01	Business
Rafe Kiely	Wyoming	Senior	3.43	Business
Anthony Makransky	Wyoming	Freshman	3.61	Business
Tayton Montgomery	Wyoming	Freshman	3.22	Business
Eric Nzeocha	Wyoming	Junior	3.09	Business
Kellen Overstreet	Wyoming	Freshman	3.39	Kinesiology
Adam Pilapil	Wyoming	Freshman	3.41	Communication
Chase Roullier	Wyoming	Junior	3.18	Mechanical Engineering
Nick Smith	Wyoming	Freshman	3.90	Business
Drew VanMaanen	Wyoming	Sophomore	3.41	Education
Zach Wallace	Wyoming	Freshman	3.32	Mechanical Engineering
Aaron Young	Wyoming	Sophomore	3.00	Psychology

== Home game attendance ==
Team	Stadium	Capacity	Game 1	Game 2	Game 3	Game 4	Game 5	Game 6	Game 7	Total	Average	% of Capacity
Air Force	Falcon Stadium	46,692	33,734	22,389	22,023	20,213	37,716	20,083	—	156,158	26,026	55.7%
Boise State	Bronco Stadium	36,387	**36,836**	33,868	35,907	31,946	32,780	30,332	—	201,669	33,611	92.4%
Colorado State	Sonny Lubick Field at Hughes Stadium	32,500	24,571	32,500	26,117	**32,546**	18,125	15,641	—	149,500	24,916	76.7%
Fresno State	Bulldog Stadium	41,031	32,547	33,675	30,540	25,604	25,476	26,375	—	174,217	29,036	70.8%
Hawaiʻi	Aloha Stadium	50,000	24,255	25,714	28,543	22,430	21,485	20,320	21,284	164,031	23,433	46.9%
Nevada	Mackay Stadium	30,000	21,483	24,355	29,551	20,426	19,992	17,215	—	133,022	22,170	73.9%
New Mexico	University Stadium	39,224	21,930	24,167	30,900	20,541	19,886	21,643	18,868	157,935	22,562	57.5%
San José State	Spartan Stadium	30,456	15,198	17,264	16,339	11,646	15,652	15,770	—	91,869	15,311	50.3%
San Diego State	Qualcomm Stadium	54,000	48,785†	18,194	29,996	25,898	36,688	22,939	20,959	203,459	29,065	53.8%
Utah State	Maverik Stadium	25,513	21,209	22,059	22,509	20,964	18,922	22,509	—	128,172	21,362	83.7%
UNLV	Sam Boyd Stadium	35,500	31,262	16,717	19,190	14,315	20,006	14,738	—	116,228	19,371	54.6%
Wyoming	War Memorial Stadium	29,181	23,669	19,112	18,723	17,026	18,682	11,149	—	108,361	18,060	61.9%

Bold – Exceed capacity
†Season High
