= 2016 East–West Shrine Game =

- All–Star Bowl Game
East Team	West Team
9	29
Head coach: Charlie Weis	Head coach: June Jones
	1	2	3	4	Total
East	9	0	0	0	9
West	0	23	6	0	29
- Date: January 23, 2016
- Season: 2015
- Stadium: Tropicana Field
- Location: St. Petersburg, Florida
- MVP: Vernon Adams (QB, Oregon) & Michael Caputo (S, Wisconsin)
- Referee: Chris Snead
- Attendance: 23,106

United States TV coverage
- Network: NFL Network

The 2016 East–West Shrine Game was the 91st staging of the all-star college football exhibition, was played on January 23, 2016 at 4:00 p.m. EST, and featured NCAA Division I Football Bowl Subdivision players and a few select invitees from Canadian university football. The game featured more than 100 players from the 2015 NCAA Division I FBS football season and prospects for the 2016 draft of the professional National Football League (NFL). In the week prior to the game, scouts from all 32 NFL teams attended. The game was held in St. Petersburg, Florida at Tropicana Field, and benefits Shriners Hospitals for Children. The game was broadcast on the NFL Network.

The East–West Shrine Game Pat Tillman Award "is presented to a player who best exemplifies character, intelligence, sportsmanship and service. The award is about a student-athlete's achievements and conduct, both on and off the field." The 2016 winner was Keenan Reynolds of Navy.

== Players ==
Full roster is available here.

=== East Team ===
==== Offense ====
No.	Name	Position	HT/WT	School
1	Tajae Sharpe	WR	6'3"/188	UMass
6	Josh Ferguson	RB	5'10"/198	Illinois
7	Blake Frohnapfel	QB	6'6"/238	UMass
10	Jake Rudock	QB	6'3"/208	Michigan
11	Rashawn Scott	WR	6'2"/203	Miami (FL)
14	Joel Stave	QB	6'5"/219	Wisconsin
18	Robby Anderson	WR	6'3"	Temple
19	Keenan Reynolds	RB	5'11"/205	Navy
21	Chris Brown	WR	6'2"/195	Notre Dame
25	Brandon Ross	RB	5'10"/210	Maryland
47	Devon Johnson	FB	6'1"/244	Marshall
54	Joe Thuney	OL	6'5"/295	North Carolina State
57	Robert Kugler	OL	6'3"/300	Purdue
60	Sean McEwen	OL	6'3"/297	Calgary
61	Graham Glasgow	OL	6'6"/303	Michigan
67	Charles Vaillancourt	OL	6'4"/315	Laval
71	Brandon Shell	OL	6'6"/328	South Carolina
72	Keith Lumpkin	OL	6'8"/325	Rutgers
74	Fahn Cooper	OL	6'5"306	Mississippi
76	Donavon Clark	OL	6'4"/325	Michigan State
77	Taylor Fallin	OL	6'6"/330	Memphis
78	Parker Ehinger	OL	6'7"/318	Cincinnati
81	Steven Scheu	TE	6'5"/245	Vanderbilt
87	Kyle Carter	TE	6'3"/252	Penn State
88	Cody Core	WR	6'3"/205	Mississippi
89	Darion Griswold	TE	6'5"/255	Arkansas State

==== Defense ====
No.	Name	Position	HT/WT	School
2	Deon Bush	S	6'1"/205	Miami (FL)
3	Jamie Byrd	S	5'11"/185	South Florida
5	Cre'Von LeBlanc	CB	5'11"/195	Florida Atlantic
8	Justin Simmons	S	6'3"/194	Boston College
9	Anthony Brown	CB	5'11"/190	Purdue
22	Elijah Shumate	S	6'0"/224	Notre Dame
23	David Mims II	CB	5'11"/198	Texas State
24	Brian Poole	CB	5'10"/211	Florida
27	D. J. White	CB	5'11"/185	Georgia Tech
28	Jordan Lomax	S	5'10"/205	Iowa
31	Juston Burris	CB	6'1"/207	North Carolina State
32	Andrew Williamson	S	6'1"212	Vanderbilt
34	Joe Bolden	LB	6'3"/232	Michigan
37	Antwione Williams	LB	6'3"/245	Georgia Southern
43	James Burgess	LB	6'0"/229	Louisville
44	Terrance Smith	LB	6'4"/230	Florida State
45	Romeo Okwara	DE	6'4"/270	Notre Dame
46	Darien Harris	LB	6'0"/220	Michigan State
48	Anthony Harrell	LB	6'2"/237	Florida
51	Mike Rose	DE	6'3"/270	North Carolina State
91	Victor Ochi	DE	6'2"/255	Stony Brook
93	Trevon Coley	DT	6'2"/300	Florida Atlantic
94	Dean Lowry	DE	6'6"/290	Northwestern
95	Nile Lawrence-Stample	DT	6'1"/302	Florida State
97	Javon Hargrave	DT	6'2"/295	South Carolina State
98	Anthony Zettel	DT	6'4"/284	Penn State
	Ryan Brown (INJ)	DE	6'6"/266	Mississippi State
	Taveze Calhoun (INJ)	CB	6'1"/180	Mississippi State
	Nicholas Vanhoose (INJ)	CB	6'0"/190	Northwestern
	Kris Frost (INJ)	LB	6'2"/234	Auburn
	Ronald Blair (INJ)	DE	6'4"/270	Appalachian State
	Connor Wujciak (INJ)	DT	6'3"/301	Boston College

==== Specialists ====
No.	Name	Position	HT/WT	School
35	John Lunsford	K	6'1"/180	Liberty
41	Will Monday	P	6'4"/210	Duke

=== West Team ===
==== Offense ====
No.	Name	Position	HT/WT	School
3	Vernon Adams	QB	5'11"/201	Oregon
5	Storm Woods	RB	6'0"/207	Oregon State
7	Nate Sudfeld	QB	6'6"/240	Indiana
8	Geronimo Allison	WR	6'3"/196	Illinois
12	Brandon Doughty	QB	6'3"/220	Western Kentucky
14	Hunter Sharp	WR	6'0"/200	Utah State
22	Danny Anthrop	WR	6'0"/193	Purdue
23	Daniel Lasco	RB	6'1"/205	California
34	Derek Watt	FB	6'2"/236	Wisconsin
54	Jake Brendel	OL	6'4"/305	UCLA
57	Chase Farris	OL	6'5"/310	Ohio State
60	Siaosi Aiono	OL	6'2"/310	Utah
64	Tyler Marz	OL	6'7"/325	Wisconsin
65	Alex Huettel	OL	6'4"/301	Bowling Green
69	Ted Karras III	OL	6'4"/307	Illinois
71	Alex Lewis	OL	6'6"/290	Nebraska
72	Marcus Henry	OL	6'3"/293	Boise State
73	Vi Teofilo	OL	6'3"/315	Arizona State
75	Lene Maiava	OL	6'5"/301	Arizona
77	Stephane Nembot	OL	6'7"/320	Colorado
82	Jared Dangerfield	WR	6'3"/215	Western Kentucky
83	David Morgan II	TE	6'4"/260	Texas-San Antonio
86	Kivon Cartwright	TE	6'4"/245	Colorado State
88	Ryan Malleck	TE	6'5"/253	Virginia Tech
89	Devon Cajuste	WR	6'4"/227	Stanford
	Tyler Johnstone (INJ)	OL	6'6"/295	Oregon
	Nelson Spruce (INJ)	WR	6'1"/205	Colorado
	Keyarris Garrett (INJ)	WR	6'4"/221	Tulsa

==== Defense ====
No.	Name	Position	HT/WT	School
2	V'Angelo Bentley	CB	5'10"/190	Illinois
4	Lloyd Carrington	CB	6'0"/195	Arizona
9	Tevin Carter	S	6'1"/215	Utah
13	Gionni Paul	LB	5'10"/225	Utah
15	Michael Jordan	CB	6'0"/200	Missouri Western State
20	Clayton Fejedelem	S	6'1"/190	Illinois
21	Ken Crawley	CB	6'1"/180	Colorado
26	R. J. Williamson	S	6'0"/216	Michigan State
29	Briean Boddy-Calhoun	CB	5'11"/190	Minnesota
31	Cory James	LB	6'0"/245	Colorado State
36	LeShaun Sims	CB	6'0"/200	Southern Utah
40	Antonio Longino	LB	6'2"/230	Arizona State
41	Travis Feeney	LB	6'4"/226	Washington
42	Michael Caputo	S	6'1"/206	Wisconsin
44	Jamal Golden	S	6'0"/195	Georgia Tech
46	De'Vondre Campbell	LB	6'5"/239	Minnesota
51	Aaron Wallace Jr.	LB	6'3"/240	UCLA
52	Anthony Sarao	LB	6'0"/235	USC
53	James Cowser	DE	6'4"/258	Southern Utah
55	David Dean	DT	6'1"/290	Virginia
56	Alex Balducci	DL	6'4"/310	Oregon
90	Gerald Dixon Jr.	DL	6'2"/269	South Carolina
91	Tyrone Holmes	DE	6'4"/250	Montana
92	Luther Maddy	DT	6'2"/283	Virginia Tech
95	Aziz Shittu	DE	6'3"/279	Stanford
97	David Onyemata	DE	6'4"/300	Manitoba
	Christian French (INJ)	LB	6'5"/250	Oregon
	Jordan Simone (INJ)	S	6'0"/195	Arizona State
	Matthew Judon (INJ)	DE	6'4"/255	Grand Valley State

==== Specialists ====
No.	Name	Position	HT/WT	School
24	Taylor Bertolet	K	5'9"/188	Texas A&M
38	Drew Kaser	P	6'3"/215	Texas A&M

== Game summary ==
=== Scoring summary ===
Scoring summary

Quarter	Time	Drive			Team	Scoring information	Score	
Quarter	Time	Plays	Yards	TOP	Team	Scoring information	East	West
1	13:12	4	6	0:54	East	31-yard field goal by John Lunsford	3	0
1	3:25				East	Interception returned 98 yards for touchdown by Brian Poole, John Lunsford kick no good (miss left)	9	0
2	14:54	7	80	3:31	West	Kivon Cartwright 11-yard touchdown reception from Vernon Adams, Taylor Bertolet kick good	9	7
2	12:41	1	93	0:15	West	Kivon Cartwright 93-yard touchdown reception from Vernon Adams, Taylor Bertolet kick no good (miss left)	9	13
2	4:50	10	80	5:33	West	Geronimo Allison 10-yard touchdown reception from Vernon Adams, Taylor Bertolet kick good	9	20
2	0:00	3	5	0:13	West	24-yard field goal by Taylor Bertolet	9	23
3	0:20	8	54	4:14	West	Geronimo Allison 10-yard touchdown reception from Nate Sudfeld, Taylor Bertolet kick no good (miss left)	9	29
"TOP" = time of possession. For other American football terms, see Glossary of American football.							9	29

=== Statistics ===
Statistics	East	West
First downs	13	19
Total offense, plays - yards	187	462
Rushes-yards (net)	25-70	19-138
Passing yards (net)	117	324
Passes, Comp-Att-Int	18-35-3	23-39-2
Time of Possession	27:27	32:33

== See also ==
- 2016 NFL draft
