= 2016 Mountain West Conference football season =

- League: NCAA Division I Football Bowl Subdivision
- Sport: Football
- Duration: August 2016–January 2017
- Teams: 12
- TV partner(s): CBS Sports Network, ABC, ESPN, ESPN2, ESPNU, CBS

2017 NFL Draft
- Top draft pick: OG Nico Siragusa, San Diego State
- Picked by: Baltimore Ravens, 122nd overall

Regular season
- Mountain Division champions: Wyoming Cowboys
- Mountain Division runners-up: Boise State Broncos
- West Division champions: San Diego State Aztecs
- West Division runners-up: Hawaii Rainbow Warriors

Championship Game
- Champions: San Diego State
- Runners-up: Wyoming

Football seasons
- 2015 2017

2016 Mountain West Conference football standings
	Conf.			Overall
Team	W		L	W		L
Mountain Division
Wyoming xy	6	–	2	8	–	6
Boise State x	6	–	2	10	–	3
New Mexico x	6	–	2	9	–	4
Air Force	5	–	3	10	–	3
Colorado State	5	–	3	7	–	6
Utah State	1	–	7	3	–	9
West Division
No. 25 San Diego State xy$	6	–	2	11	–	3
Hawaii	4	–	4	7	–	7
Nevada	3	–	5	5	–	7
San Jose State	3	–	5	4	–	8
UNLV	3	–	5	4	–	8
Fresno State	0	–	8	1	–	11
Championship: San Diego State 27, Wyoming 24
$ – Conference champion; x – Division champion/co-champions; y – Championship game participant; Rankings from AP Poll

The 2016 Mountain West Conference football season was the 18th season of college football for the Mountain West Conference (MW). In the 2016 NCAA Division I FBS football season, the MW had 12 football members: Air Force, Boise State, Colorado State, Fresno State, Hawaii, Nevada, New Mexico, San Diego State, San Jose State, UNLV, Utah State, and Wyoming.

== Preseason ==
=== Mountain West Media ===
2016 Mountain West Football Media Days were held on July 26 and 27 at the Cosmopolitan on the Las Vegas Strip.

==== Preseason polls ====
Place	Mountain Division	West Division
1	Boise State (27) 172	San Diego State (29) 174
2	Air Force (2) 126	Nevada 129
3	Utah State 111	San Jose State 122
4	Colorado State 95	Fresno State 76
5	New Mexico 74	UNLV 73
6	Wyoming 31	Hawai'i 35

- First place votes in parentheses

==== Preseason All-Mountain West Teams ====
Offense
Position	Player	Class	Team
QB	Brett Rypien*	SO.	Boise State
WR	Thomas Sperbeck*	SR.	Boise State
WR	Devonte Boyd**	JR.	UNLV
RB	Donnel Pumphrey*	SR.	San Diego State
RB	Brian Hill**	JR.	Wyoming
OL	Fred Zerblis**	SR.	Colorado State
OL	Nico Siragusa*	SR.	San Diego State
OL	Jake Simonich	SR.	Utah State
OL	Austin Stephens	SR.	Utah State
OL	Chase Roullier**	SR.	Wyoming
TE	Billy Freeman*	SR.	San Jose State

Defense
Position	Player	Class	Team
DL	Nik D'Avanzo	SR.	New Mexico
DL	Alex Barrett**	SR.	San Diego State
DL	Travis Seefeldt	GR.	Utah State
DL	Ricky Ali'ifua	SR.	Utah State
LB	Christian Tago**	SR.	San Jose State
LB	Calvin Munson*	SR.	San Diego State
LB	Dakota Cox	SR.	New Mexico
DB	Weston Steelhammer*	SR.	Air Force
DB	Damontae Kazee*	SR.	San Diego State
DB	Dameon Baber**	SO.	Nevada
DB	Andrew Wingard**	SO.	Wyoming

Specialists
Position	Player	Class	Team
P	Hayden Hunt**	SR.	Colorado State
P	Michael Carrizosa*	JR.	San Jose State
PK	Tyler Rausa*	SR.	Boise State
KR	Rashaad Penny*	JR.	San Diego State

- Preseason Offensive Player of the Year:

Donnel Pumphrey, SR., RB, San Diego State

- Preseason Defensive Player of the Year:

Damontae Kazee, SR., DB, San Diego State

- Preseason Special Teams Player of the Year:

Rashaad Penny, JR., KR, San Diego State

(* - member of the 2015 All-Mountain West first team)

(** - member of the 2015 All-Mountain West second team)

=== Award watch lists ===
The following Mountain West players were named to preseason award watch lists.

Maxwell Award:

- Jacobi Owens–Air Force
- Jeremy McNichols–Boise State
- Brett Rypien–Boise State
- Donnel Pumphrey–San Diego State
- Brian Hill–Wyoming

Chuck Bednarik Award:

- Damontae Kazee–San Diego State
- Calvin Munson–San Diego State

John Mackey Award:

- Jake Roh–Boise State
- Jarred Gipson–Nevada
- Billy Freeman–San Jose State
- Wyatt Houston–Utah State

Rimington Trophy:

- Jake Bennett–Colorado State
- Asotui Eli–Hawai'i
- Nathan Goltry–Nevada
- Arthur Flores–San Diego State
- Will Kreitler–UNLV
- Austin Stephens–Utah State

Lou Groza Award:

- Tyler Rausa–Boise State
- Brent Zuzo–Nevada

Ray Guy Award:

- Hayden Hunt–Colorado State
- Alex Boy–Nevada
- Michael Carrizosa–San Jose State
- Ethan Wood–Wyoming

Bronko Nagurski Trophy:

- Weston Steelhammer–Air Force
- Tanner Vallejo–Boise State
- Calvin Munson–San Diego State

Outland Trophy:

- Fred Zerblis–Colorado State
- Austin Corbett–Nevada
- Nico Siragusa–San Diego State
- Chase Roullier–Wyoming

Jim Thorpe Award:

- Roland Ladipo–Air Force
- Weston Steelhammer–Air Force
- Damontae Kazee–San Diego State
- Andrew Wingard–Wyoming

Butkus Award:

- Tanner Vallejo–Boise State
- Kevin Davis–Colorado State
- Calvin Munson–San Diego State

Fred Biletnikoff Award:

- Thomas Sperbeck–Boise State
- Hasaan Henderson–Nevada
- Jerico Richardson–Nevada
- Devonte Boyd–UNLV

Wuerffel Trophy:

- Zack Golditch–Colorado State
- Jeremy Maculey–Nevada
- Daniel Brunskill–San Diego State
- Tim Crawley–San Jose State
- Travis Seefeldt–Utah State

Davey O'Brien Award:

- Brett Rypien–Boise State

Doak Walker Award:

- Jacobi Owens–Air Force
- Paul Harris–Hawai'i
- James Butler–Nevada
- Donnel Pumphrey–San Diego State
- Devante Mays–Utah State
- Brian Hill–Wyoming

Walter Camp Award:

- Brett Rypien–Boise State
- Donnel Pumphrey–San Diego State

Paul Hornung Award:

- Rashaad Penny–San Diego State
- Tim Crawley–San Jose State

== Coaches ==
NOTE: Stats shown are before the beginning of the season

Team	Head coach	Years at school	Overall record	Record at school	MW record
Air Force	Troy Calhoun	10	67–50	67–50	40–32
Boise State	Bryan Harsin	3	28–11	21–6	12–4
Colorado State	Mike Bobo	2	7–6	7–6	5–3
Fresno State	Tim DeRuyter	5	30–23	29–23	21–11
Hawaiʻi	Nick Rolovich	1	0–0	0–0	0–0
Nevada	Brian Polian	4	18–20	18–20	11–13
New Mexico	Bob Davie	5	53–57	18–32	9–23
San Diego State	Rocky Long	8	108–92	43–23	30–9
San José State	Ron Caragher	4	59–44	15–22	11–13
UNLV	Tony Sanchez	2	3–9	3–9	2–6
Utah State	Matt Wells	4	25–16	25–16	18–6
Wyoming	Craig Bohl	3	110–50	6–18	4–12

== Rankings ==
Legend
	Increase in ranking
	Decrease in ranking
	Unranked the previous week
RV	Received votes but were not ranked in Top 25 of poll

		Pre	Wk 2	Wk 3	Wk 4	Wk 5	Wk 6	Wk 7	Wk 8	Wk 9	Wk 10	Wk 11	Wk 12	Wk 13	Wk 14	Wk 15	Final
Air Force	AP						RV	RV							RV	RV	RV
Air Force	C					RV	RV								RV		RV
Air Force	CFP	Not released															
Boise State	AP	RV	RV	RV	RV	24	19	15	14	13	24	24	22	20	RV	RV	RV
Boise State	C	RV	RV	RV	RV	RV	19	15	14	13	24	24	23	19	RV	RV	RV
Boise State	CFP	Not released									24	22	20	19			
Colorado State	AP																
Colorado State	C																
Colorado State	CFP	Not released															
Fresno State	AP																
Fresno State	C																
Fresno State	CFP	Not released															
Hawaiʻi	AP																
Hawaiʻi	C																
Hawaiʻi	CFP	Not released															
Nevada	AP																
Nevada	C																
Nevada	CFP	Not released															
New Mexico	AP																
New Mexico	C																
New Mexico	CFP	Not released															
San Diego State	AP	RV	RV	RV	22	19	RV	RV	RV	RV	RV	RV	24		RV	RV	25
San Diego State	C	RV	RV	RV	RV	24	RV	RV	RV	RV	RV	RV	25	RV	RV	RV	25
San Diego State	CFP	Not released															
San José State	AP																
San José State	C																
San José State	CFP	Not released															
UNLV	AP																
UNLV	C																
UNLV	CFP	Not released															
Utah State	AP																
Utah State	C																
Utah State	CFP	Not released															
Wyoming	AP										RV	RV		RV			
Wyoming	C									RV	RV	RV		RV	RV		
Wyoming	CFP	Not released															

== Championship game ==
The Championship Game was played between the San Diego State Aztecs, champions of the West Division, and the Wyoming Cowboys, champions of the Mountain Division, on December 3, 2016, at War Memorial Stadium in Laramie, Wyoming. The Aztecs won 27–24, repeating as champions. Running back Rashaad Penny of San Diego State was the offensive MVP, and defensive back Damontae Kazee of San Diego State was the defensive MVP.

== Bowl games ==
Bowl Game	Date	Stadium	City	Television	Team Matchups	Winning team	Score	Losing team	Score
New Mexico Bowl	December 17	University Stadium	Albuquerque, NM	ESPN	New Mexico vs. UTSA	New Mexico	23	UTSA	20
Las Vegas Bowl	December 17	Sam Boyd Stadium	Whitney, NV	ABC	Houston vs. San Diego State	San Diego State	34	Houston	10
Poinsettia Bowl	December 21	Qualcomm Stadium	San Diego, CA	ESPN	BYU vs. Wyoming	BYU	24	Wyoming	21
Famous Idaho Potato Bowl	December 22	Albertsons Stadium	Boise, ID	ESPN	Idaho vs. Colorado State	Idaho	61	Colorado State	50
Hawai'i Bowl	December 24	Aloha Stadium	Honolulu, HI	ESPN	Hawai'i vs. Middle Tennessee	Hawai'i	52	Middle Tennessee	35
Cactus Bowl	December 27	Chase Field	Phoenix, AZ	ESPN	Boise State vs. Baylor	Baylor	31	Boise State	12
Arizona Bowl	December 30	Arizona Stadium	Tucson, AZ	ASN	South Alabama vs. Air Force	Air Force	45	South Alabama	21

== Mountain West vs Power Conference matchups ==
=== Records against other conferences ===
2016 records against non-conference foes:

Regular season

Power 5 Conferences	Record
ACC	0–0
Big Ten	0–6
Big 12	0–1
Pac-12	3–6
SEC	0–0
Notre Dame	0–1
Power 5 Total	3–14
Other FBS Conferences	Record
American	1–2
C-USA	1–0
MAC	3–3
Sun Belt	4–3
Independents (Excluding Notre Dame)	3–0
Other FBS Total	12–8
FCS Opponents	Record
Football Championship Subdivision	11–0
Total Non-Conference Record	26–22

Post Season

Power Conferences	Record
Big 12	0–1
Power 5 Total	0–1
Other FBS Conferences	Record
American	1–0
C–USA	2–0
Sun Belt	1–1
Independents (Excluding Notre Dame)	0–1
Total Bowl Record	4–3

== Awards and honors ==
=== All Conference teams ===
- Offensive Player of the Year: Donnel Pumphrey, SR., RB, San Diego State
- Defensive Player of the Year: Damontae Kazee, SR., DB, San Diego State
- Special Teams Player of the Year: Rashaad Penny, JR., KR, San Diego State
- Freshman of the Year: Logan Wilson, LB, Wyoming
- Coach of the Year: Craig Bohl, Wyoming

Offense:

Pos.	Name	Yr.	School	Name	Yr.	School
First Team				Second Team		
QB	Brett Rypien*	SO.	Boise State	Josh Allen	SO.	Wyoming
WR	Thomas Sperbeck*	SR.	Boise State	Tanner Gentry	SR.	Wyoming
WR	Michael Gallup	JR.	Colorado State	Jalen Robinette	SR.	Air Force
RB	Donnel Pumphrey**	SR.	San Diego State	Jeremy McNichols***	JR.	Boise State
RB	Brian Hill	JR.	Wyoming	Teriyon Gipson	SR.	New Mexico
TE	Jacob Hollister	SR.	Wyoming	David Wells	JR.	San Diego State
OL	Travis Averill	SR.	Boise State	Jake Bennett	JR.	Colorado State
OL	Mario Yakoo	SR.	Boise State	Dejon Allen	JR.	Hawai'i
OL	Fred Zerblis	SR.	Colorado State	Austin Corbett	JR.	Nevada
OL	Nico Siragusa*	SR.	San Diego State	Reno Henderson	SR.	New Mexico
OL	Chase Roullier	SR.	Wyoming	Daniel Brunskill	SR.	San Diego State
PK	John Baron II	SO.	San Diego State	Luke Strebel	SR.	Air Force
PR/KR	Rashaad Penny*	JR.	San Diego State	D.J. May	SR.	Wyoming

Defense:

Pos.	Name	Yr.	School	Name	Yr.	School
First Team				Second Team		
DL	Ryan Watson	SR.	Air Force	Malik Reed	SO.	Nevada
DL	Sam McCaskill	SR.	Boise State	Nik D'Avanzo	SR.	New Mexico
DL	David Moa	SO.	Boise State	Garrett Hughes	JR.	New Mexico
DL	Alex Barrett*	SR.	San Diego State	Travis Seefeldt	SR.	Utah State
LB	Calvin Munson*	SR.	San Diego State	Ben Weaver	SR.	Boise State
LB	Jahlani Tavai	SO.	Hawai'i	Kevin Davis	SR.	Colorado State
LB	Tau Lotulelei	SR.	UNLV	Jeff Camilli	SR.	Fresno State
DB	Andre Chachere	JR.	San Jose State	Brodie Hicks	SR.	Air Force
DB	Weston Steelhammer**	SR.	Air Force	Chanceller James	SR.	Boise State
DB	Andrew Wingard	SO.	Wyoming	Jonathan Moxey	SR.	Boise State
DB	Damontae Kazee*	SR.	San Diego State	Malik Smith	SR.	San Diego State
P	Hayden Hunt	SR.	Colorado State	Sean Wale	SR.	Boise State

(* – Two-Time First-Team Selection)
(** – Three-Time First-Team Selection)
(*** – Two-Time Second-Team Selection)

Honorable Mentions:

- Air Force: Haji Dunn, Sr., LB; Tim McVey, Jr., KR; Colin Sandor, Sr., OL; Dylan Vail, Sr., OL.
- Boise State: Steven Baggett, Sr., OL; Mason Hampton, Jr., OL; Tanner Vallejo, Sr., LB; Cedrick Wilson, Jr., WR.
- Colorado State: Nick Callender, Sr., OL; Nick Stevens, Jr., QB; Paul Thurston, Sr., OL.
- Fresno State: Stratton Brown, Sr., DB; KeeSean Johnson, So., WR; Kody Kroening, Jr., P.
- Hawai'i: Trayvon Henderson, Jr., DB; Marcus Kemp, Sr., WR; Leo Koloamatangi, Sr., OL; Meffy Koloamatangi, Jr., DL; Jalen Rogers, Sr., DB; Rigoberto Sanchez, Sr., PK/P.
- Nevada: James Butler, Jr., RB; Wyatt Demps, Jr., WR; Asauni Rufus, So., DB.
- New Mexico: Dakota Cox, Sr., LB; Daniel Henry, Sr., DB; Aaron Jenkins, So., OL; Jason Sanders, Jr., PK.
- San Diego State: Kyle Kelley, Sr., DL; Quest Truxton, Jr., PR.
- San Jose State: Michael Carrizosa, Jr., P; Isaiah Irving, Sr., DL; Jeremiah Kolone, Jr., OL; Maurice McKnight, Jr., DB; Christian Tago, Sr., LB.
- UNLV: Troy Hawthorne, Sr., DB; Mike Hughes, Jr., DL; Nathan Jacobson, So., OL; Will Kreitler, Sr., OL; Torry McTyer, Sr., DB.
- Utah State: Austin Albrecht, Sr., OL; Ricky Ali'ifua, Sr., DL; Wyatt Houston, Sr., TE; Jake Simonich, Sr., OL; Austin Stephens, Sr., OL.
- Wyoming: Lucas Wacha, Sr., LB

== Home game attendance ==
Team	Stadium	Capacity	Game 1	Game 2	Game 3	Game 4	Game 5	Game 6	Game 7	Total	Average	% of Capacity
Air Force	Falcon Stadium	46,692	34,128	24,173	43,063	18,756	29,132	23,467	23,556	196,275	28,039	60.1%
Boise State	Albertsons Stadium	36,387	36,163	**36,602**	33,448	34,575	31,863	32,989	—	205,640	34,273	94.2%
Colorado State	Sonny Lubick Field at Hughes Stadium	32,500	20,673	26,718	**33,500**	32,387	23,187	29,133	—	165,598	27,600	84.9%
Fresno State	Bulldog Stadium	41,031	31,817	23,273	24,731	25,197	26,951	20,991	—	152,960	25,493	62.1%
Hawaiʻi	Aloha Stadium	50,000	23,900	23,503	31,287	23,964	22,731	22,739	—	148,124	24,687	49.4%
Nevada	Mackay Stadium	30,000	19,138	20,457	22,411	18,877	16,730	13,390	—	111,003	18,501	61.7%
New Mexico	University Stadium	39,224	20,221	19,852	20,090	18,099	17,290	16,698	—	112,250	18,708	47.7%
San José State	Spartan Stadium	30,456	13,210	16,041	16,837	15,161	15,733	15,533	—	92,515	15,419	50.6%
San Diego State	Qualcomm Stadium	54,000	†46,486	42,473	33,296	25,613	41,644	34,223	—	223,735	37,289	69.1%
Utah State	Maverik Stadium	25,513	23,008	21,091	23,104	15,067	17,332	15,212	—	114,814	19,136	75.0%
UNLV	Sam Boyd Stadium	35,500	18,575	17,229	17,811	18,362	14,790	23,569	—	110,336	18,389	51.8%
Wyoming	War Memorial Stadium	29,181	18,483	18,781	26,623	24,023	17,837	19,112	24,001	148,860	21,265	72.9%

Bold – Exceed capacity
†Season High
