= Trevon Coley =

American football player (born 1994)

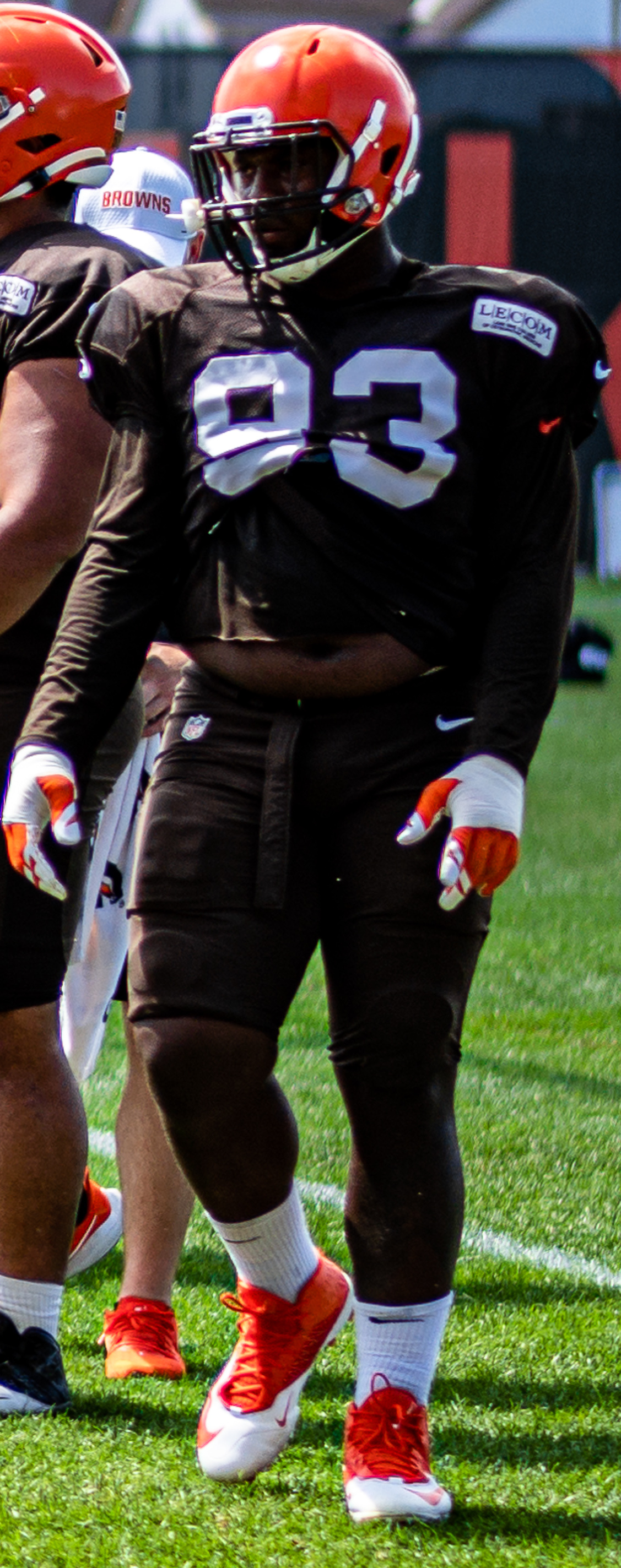
- Coley with the Cleveland Browns in 2019

Profile
- Position: Defensive end

Personal information
- Born: July 13, 1994 (age 32); Miami, Florida, U.S.
- Listed height: 6 ft 1 in (1.85 m)
- Listed weight: 307 lb (139 kg)

Career information
- High school: Miramar (Miramar, Florida)
- College: Florida Atlantic
- NFL draft: 2016: undrafted

Career history
- Baltimore Ravens (2016)*; Washington Redskins (2016)*; Cleveland Browns (2016–2018); Baltimore Ravens (2019)*; Indianapolis Colts (2019); Arizona Cardinals (2020); New York Jets (2020); Tennessee Titans (2021); Chicago Bears (2022)*; Tennessee Titans (2023)*; Arlington Renegades (2024)*; San Antonio Brahmas (2024)
- * Offseason or practice squad member only

Awards and highlights
- First-team All-C-USA (2015)

Career NFL statistics
- Total tackles: 100
- Sacks: 3.5
- Fumble recoveries: 2
- Stats at Pro Football Reference

Trevon Coley (born July 13, 1994) is an American professional football defensive end. He played college football at Florida Atlantic. He has previously played for the Washington Redskins, Indianapolis Colts, Cleveland Browns, Baltimore Ravens, and New York Jets.

== Early life ==
Coley played high school football for the Patriots at Miramar High School in Miramar, Florida. He was named Second Team All-State for his senior season in 2011.

== College career ==
Coley played for the Florida Atlantic Owls of Florida Atlantic University from 2012 to 2015. He was named First Team All-Conference USA in 2015. He was also team captain and the team's MVP in 2015. Coley played in 48 games, all starts, during his college career. He was a communication major at Florida Atlantic. He played in the 2016 East–West Shrine Game.

== Professional career ==
=== Pre-draft ===
Coley was rated the 33rd best defensive tackle in the 2016 NFL draft by NFLDraftScout.com. Lance Zierlein of NFL.com predicted that he would go undrafted, stating "While he's got decent play strength, solid hand usage and the desired motor, his smallish stature will be tough to overlook for teams during the draft. With that said, he's a good football player and will get his shot in a camp."

Pre-draft measurables
Height	Weight	40-yard dash	10-yard split	20-yard split	20-yard shuttle	Three-cone drill	Vertical jump	Broad jump	Bench press
6 ft 1 in (1.85 m)	304 lb (138 kg)	4.98 s	1.73 s	2.84 s	4.57 s	7.02 s	29 1/2 in (0.75 m)	8 ft 9 in (2.67 m)	22 reps
All values from Florida Atlantic Pro Day

=== Baltimore Ravens (first stint) ===
After going undrafted, Coley signed with the Baltimore Ravens on May 6, 2016. He was waived by the Ravens on August 29, 2016.

=== Washington Redskins ===
On November 30, 2016, Coley was signed to the practice squad of the Washington Redskins. He was released by the Redskins on December 13, 2016.

=== Cleveland Browns ===
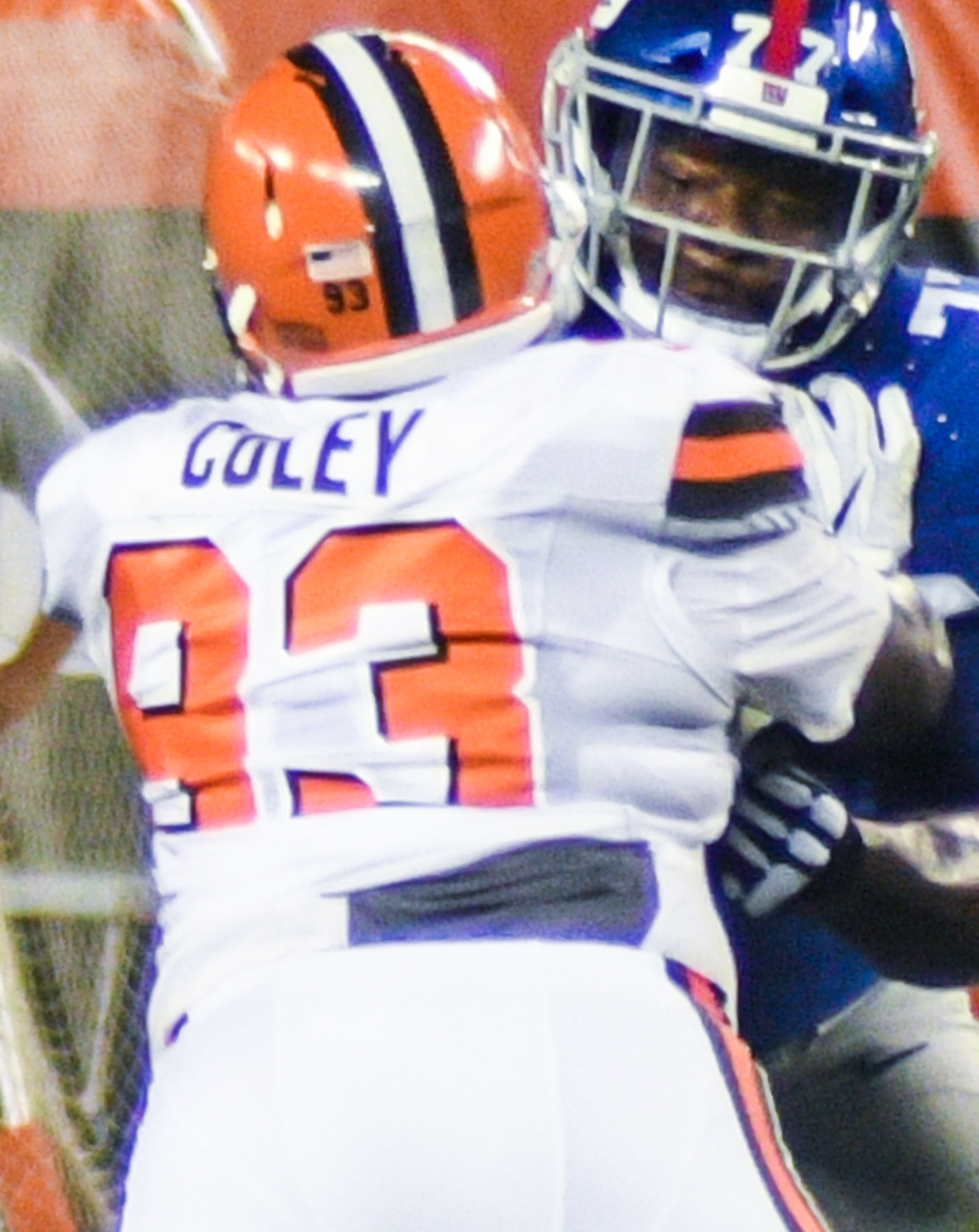
Coley with the Browns in 2017

On December 15, 2016, Coley was signed to the Cleveland Browns' practice squad. He signed a reserve/future contract with the Browns on January 2, 2017. In Week 2 of the 2017 season, against the Baltimore Ravens, Coley recovered a fumble from Ravens' running back Alex Collins in the 24–10 loss. On the same play, Coley then fumbled the ball himself and it was recovered by teammate Nate Orchard. Overall, he played in 15 games in the 2017 season. He recorded 41 combined tackles, two sacks, four quarterback hits, and two passes defensed. In the 2018 season, he appeared in all 16 games and started 14 for the Browns. He recorded a safety in Week 7 against the Tampa Bay Buccaneers when he tackled Peyton Barber in the endzone in the first quarter. He finished the season with 0.5 sacks, 39 combined tackles, one quarterback hit, and one fumble recovery.

Coley was waived by the Browns on September 1, 2019.

=== Baltimore Ravens (second stint) ===
On September 3, 2019, Coley was signed to the Baltimore Ravens' practice squad.

=== Indianapolis Colts ===
On October 1, 2019, Coley was signed by the Indianapolis Colts off the Ravens practice squad.

=== Arizona Cardinals ===
On March 27, 2020, Coley signed with the Arizona Cardinals. On September 5, 2020, Coley was waived during final roster cuts. He was re-signed to the practice squad a day later. He was elevated to the active roster on October 19 and 24 for the team's weeks 6 and 7 games against the Dallas Cowboys, and reverted to the practice squad after each game. He was signed to the active roster on November 14. He was waived on December 12, 2020.

=== New York Jets ===
On December 14, 2020, Coley was claimed off waivers by the New York Jets.

=== Tennessee Titans (first stint) ===
On June 3, 2021, Coley signed with the Tennessee Titans. He was placed on injured reserve on August 17, 2021.

=== Chicago Bears ===
On August 5, 2022, Coley signed with the Chicago Bears. He was released on August 30, 2022 and signed to the practice squad the next day.

=== Tennessee Titans (second stint) ===
On August 21, 2023, Coley signed with the Tennessee Titans. He was released on August 29, 2023.

=== Arlington Renegades ===
On January 23, 2024, Coley signed with the Arlington Renegades of the United Football League (UFL). He was released on March 10, 2024.

=== San Antonio Brahmas ===
On June 5, 2024, Coley signed with the San Antonio Brahmas of the United Football League (UFL). He was waived on August 23, 2024.

== Personal life ==
Coley is the cousin of former NFL quarterback Rohan Davey.
