= Bo Bonnheim =

American football player

Bo Bonnheim is a former American football offensive lineman. He played college football for Fresno State.

== Early years ==
As a senior for Paso Robles High School in the fall of 2010, Bonnheim was named Pac 7 Defensive Lineman of the Year, and was selected for Tribune All-San Luis Obispo County First Team and All-Southern Section Western Division honors.

== College career ==
Bonnheim began his career with Fresno State as a preferred walk-on, but eventually earned a scholarship.

He became a starting left guard for the Bulldogs midway through his sophomore season, before starting at center in 2014 and 2015.

In 2015, Bonnheim was named to the Watch List for the Rimington Trophy, awarded annually to Division I's top center. In 2016, he qualified for the NFF Hampshire Honor Society list.
