= 2017 Senior Bowl =

2017 Reese's Senior Bowl
- 68th Senior Bowl
North Team	South Team
15	16
Head coach: John Fox (Chicago Bears)	Head coach: Hue Jackson (Cleveland Browns)
	1	2	3	4	Total
North	3	0	6	6	15
South	0	9	7	0	16
- Date: January 28, 2017
- Season: 2016
- Stadium: Ladd–Peebles Stadium
- Location: Mobile, Alabama
- MVP: Davis Webb
- Referee: James Carter
- Attendance: 32,175

United States TV coverage
- Network: NFL Network

The 2017 Senior Bowl was an all-star college football exhibition game featuring players from the 2016 NCAA Division I FBS football season, and prospects for the 2017 draft of the professional National Football League (NFL). The game concluded the post-season that began on December 17, 2016. It was sponsored by Reese's Peanut Butter Cups and is officially known as the Reese's Senior Bowl. The game was coached by John Fox of the Chicago Bears and Hue Jackson of the Cleveland Browns.

The Game was played on January 28, 2017, at 1:30 p.m. CST, at Ladd–Peebles Stadium in Mobile, Alabama, between "North" and "South" teams. Coverage of the event was provided by NFL Network.

== Rosters ==
The entire roster was announced on January 18. Western Michigan's Corey Davis was unable to attend the Senior Bowl after suffering a shoulder injury.

=== North Team ===
No.	Name	Position	HT/WT	School	Note
3	Sefo Liufau	QB	6'4/240	Colorado	
4	Nathan Peterman	QB	6'2/225	Pittsburgh	
5	Trent Taylor	WR	5'8/178	Louisiana Tech	
5	Zane Gonzalez	PK	6'1/195	Arizona State	
6	Corey Clement	RB	5'11/227	Wisconsin	
7	Zay Jones	WR	6'1/197	East Carolina	
9	John Johnson	S	6'0/202	Boston College	
10	Cooper Kupp	WR	6'2/215	Eastern Washington	
11	Aarion Penton	CB	5'9/177	Missouri	
12	Jamari Staples	WR	6'4/195	Louisville	
13	Rasul Douglas	CB	6'2/203	West Virginia	
14	Desmond King	CB	5'11/203	Iowa	
15	C. J. Beathard	QB	6'2/215	Iowa	
16	Connor Harris	ILB	6'0/243	Lindenwood	
17	Amba Etta-Tawo	WR	6'2/202	Syracuse	Did not participate after suffering an injury to his finger during practice.
19	Jalen Robinette	WR	6'4/215	Air Force	
20	Obi Melifonwu	S	6'3/217	UConn	
22	Lorenzo Jerome	S	6'0/195	St. Francis (PA)	
24	Nate Gerry	S	6'2/220	Nebraska	
26	Jourdan Lewis	CB	5'11/186	Michigan	
31	Brendan Langley	CB	6'1/190	Lamar	
33	Kareem Hunt	RB	6'0/225	Toledo	
37	Toby Baker	P	6'3/215	Arkansas	
42	Ben Gedeon	ILB	6'3/247	Michigan	
43	Chris Wormley	DE	6'6/303	Michigan	
44	De'Veon Smith	RB	5'11/228	Michigan	
45	Sam Rogers	FB	5'11/230	Virginia Tech	
47	Vince Biegel	OLB	6'4/245	Wisconsin	
49	Colin Holba	LS	6'5/245	Louisville	
52	Jordan Herdman	ILB	6'0/240	Simon Fraser	
55	Kyle Fuller	OC	6'5/315	Baylor	
56	Carroll Phillips	OLB	6'3/240	Illinois	
57	Haason Reddick	ILB	6'1/230	Temple	
65	Tyler Orlosky	OC	6'4/296	West Virginia	
66	Dion Dawkins	OG	6'5/320	Temple	
67	Dan Feeney	OG	6'4/305	Indiana	
68	Kyle Kalis	OG	6'4/308	Michigan	
69	Adam Bisnowaty	OT	6'6/305	Pittsburgh	
70	Julien Davenport	OT	6'7/315	Bucknell	
72	Taylor Moton	OT	6'5/328	Western Michigan	
73	Zach Banner	OT	6'9/360	USC	
77	Jordan Morgan	OG	6'4/320	Kutztown	
80	Michael Roberts	TE	6'5/270	Toledo	
82	Amara Darboh	WR	6'2/215	Michigan	
83	Jeremy Sprinkle	TE	6'6/256	Arkansas	
87	Jonnu Smith	TE	6'3/232	Florida International	
90	Isaac Rochell	DE	6'4/290	Notre Dame	
91	Dawuane Smoot	DE	6'3/255	Illinois	
93	Tarell Basham	DE	6'4/260	Ohio	
94	Derek Rivers	OLB	6'5/255	Youngstown State	
95	Larry Ogunjobi	DT	6'3/297	Charlotte	
96	Ryan Glasgow	DT	6'4/299	Michigan	
97	Jaleel Johnson	DT	6'4/310	Iowa	
98	Stevie Tu'ikolovatu	DT	6'1/320	USC	

=== South Team ===
No.	Name	Position	HT/WT	School	
0	Duke Riley	ILB	6'1/230	LSU	
1	Montravius Adams	DT	6'4/309	Auburn	
2	Antonio Pipkin	QB	6'3/225	Tiffin	
3	Artavis Scott	WR	5'10/190	Clemson	
5	Tyus Bowser	OLB	6'3/240	Houston	
6	Justin Vogel	P	6'4/215	Miami (FL)	
7	Davis Webb	QB	6'5/230	California	
8	Fred Ross	WR	6'2/205	Mississippi State	
10	Ben Boulware	ILB	6'0/235	Clemson	
11	Joshua Dobbs	QB	6'3/210	Tennessee	
12	Gerald Everett	TE	6'4/240	South Alabama	
13	Ryan Switzer	WR	5'10/185	North Carolina	
14	Justin Evans	S	6'1/195	Texas A&M	
17	Evan Engram	TE	6'3/227	Ole Miss	
18	Tre'Davious White	CB	6'0/197	LSU	
19	Donnel Pumphrey	RB	5'9/180	San Diego State	
20	Matthew Dayes	RB	5'10/203	North Carolina State	
21	Jamaal Williams	RB	6'2/220	BYU	Originally slated to play for North team.
22	Ryan Anderson	OLB	6'2/253	Alabama	Did not participate after suffering thumb injury during practice.
23	Johnathan Ford	S	6'0/204	Auburn	
24	Damontae Kazee	CB	5'11/190	San Diego State	
26	Rayshawn Jenkins	S	6'2/210	Miami (FL)	
27	Marquez White	CB	6'0/184	Florida State	
29	Corn Elder	CB	5'10/180	Miami (FL)	
30	Jordan Sterns	S	6'0/200	Oklahoma State	
31	Ezra Robinson	CB	6'1/180	Tennessee State	
33	Cameron Sutton	CB	5'11/186	Tennessee	
34	Alex Anzalone	ILB	6'3/241	Florida	
43	Freddie Stevenson	FB	6'1/241	Florida State	
46	Jake Elliott	PK	5'10/165	Memphis	
47	Eddie Vanderdoes	DT	6'3/325	UCLA	
49	Josh Carraway	DE	6'4/250	TCU	
51	Harvey Langi	ILB	6'3/249	BYU	Originally slated to play of North team.
53	Antonio Garcia	OT	6'7/302	Troy	
54	Isaac Asiata	OG	6'3/305	Utah	
54	Dalvin Tomlinson	DT	6'3/323	Alabama	
55	Cole Mazza	LS	6'2/235	Alabama	
56	Nico Siragusa	OG	6'5/330	San Diego State	Did not participate due to thumb injury sustained in practice.
58	Justin Senior	OT	6'5/310	Mississippi State	
63	Danny Isidora	OG	6'4/305	Miami (FL)	
66	Jessamen Dunker	OG	6'5/305	Tennessee State	
68	Conor McDermott	OT	6'8/310	UCLA	
72	Jon Toth	OC	6'5/310	Kentucky	
75	Jordan Willis	DE	6'5/258	Kansas State	
76	Forrest Lamp	OT	6'4/300	Western Kentucky	
77	Ethan Pocic	OC	6'7/302	LSU	
81	Josh Reynolds	WR	6'4/190	Texas A&M	
82	Taywan Taylor	WR	6'1/195	Western Kentucky	
83	Travin Dural	WR	6'2/207	LSU	
84	Chad Williams	WR	6'2/204	Grambling State	
88	O. J. Howard	TE	6'6/251	Alabama	
90	Daeshon Hall	DE	6'6/260	Texas A&M	
92	Tanoh Kpassagnon	DE	6'7/290	Villanova	
93	Keionta Davis	DE	6'4/270	Chattanooga	
94	Carlos Watkins	DT	6'3/305	Clemson	
97	Tanzel Smart	DT	6'1/305	Tulane	

== Game summary ==
=== Scoring summary ===
Scoring Play	Score
1st Quarter
NORTH – Zane Gonzalez 22–yard field goal, 03:35	NORTH 3 – 0
2nd Quarter
SOUTH – Josh Reynolds 39–yard pass from Davis Webb (Webb pass failed), 02:33	SOUTH 6 – 3
SOUTH – Jake Elliott 37–yard field goal, 00:06	SOUTH 9 – 3
3rd Quarter
SOUTH – Matt Dayes 2–yard run (Jake Elliott kick), 06:29	SOUTH 16 – 3
NORTH – Zane Gonzalez 29–yard field goal, 01:57	SOUTH 16 – 6
NORTH – Zane Gonzalez 39–yard field goal, 00:00	SOUTH 16 – 9
4th Quarter
NORTH – Zay Jones 6–yard pass from Nate Peterman (Peterman pass INT), 01:51	SOUTH 16 – 15

=== Statistics ===
Statistics	North	South
First downs	18	23
Total offense, plays - yards	58-305	63-409
Rushes-yards (net)	29-177	26-141
Passing yards (net)	128	268
Passes, Comp-Att-Int	17-25-0	25-35-3
Time Of Possession	31:20	28:40
