= Donnel Pumphrey =

American football player and coach (born 1994)

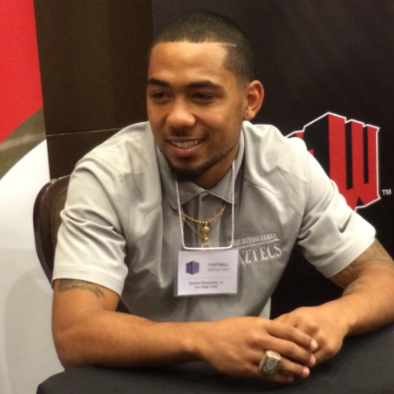
- Pumphrey at 2016 Mountain West Media Days

Sacramento State Hornets
- Title: Running backs coach

Personal information
- Born: December 6, 1994 (age 31); North Las Vegas, Nevada, U.S.
- Listed height: 5 ft 8 in (1.73 m)
- Listed weight: 176 lb (80 kg)

Career information
- High school: Canyon Springs (North Las Vegas)
- College: San Diego State (2013–2016)
- NFL draft: 2017: 4th round, 132nd overall pick

Career history

Playing
- Philadelphia Eagles (2017); Detroit Lions (2018)*; Philadelphia Eagles (2018–2019)*; DC Defenders (2020)
- * Offseason or practice squad member only

Coaching
- San Diego State (2022) Graduate assistant; Sacramento State (2023–present) Running backs coach

Awards and highlights
- Super Bowl champion (LII); Jim Brown Trophy (2016); First-team All-American (2016); NCAA rushing yards leader (2016); 2× MW Offensive Player of the Year (2015, 2016); 3× First-team All-MWC (2014–2016); NCAA (FBS) record: Career rushing yards: 6,405
- Stats at Pro Football Reference

Donnel Laray Pumphrey Jr. (born December 6, 1994) is an American college football coach and former player who is the running backs coach for California State University, Sacramento, a position he has held since 2023. Pumphrey played college football as a running back for the San Diego State Aztecs. He is the official all-time leader in rushing yards in NCAA Division I FBS history. (Note: Statistics accumulated in bowl games prior to 2002 are not accounted for by the NCAA. If bowl statistics are taken into account for all players, Pumphrey's rushing yards would rank fourth in NCAA Division I FBS history, behind Ron Dayne, Ricky Williams, and Tony Dorsett.) Pumphrey was selected by the Philadelphia Eagles in the fourth round of the 2017 NFL draft, and spent offseasons with the Eagles and Detroit Lions. He played for the DC Defenders of the XFL in 2020.

== Early life ==
Pumphrey attended Canyon Springs High School in North Las Vegas, Nevada. As a senior, he was the Gatorade High School Football Player of the Year for Nevada after rushing for 1,491 yards on 160 carries with 19 touchdowns. During his career, he ran for 4,152 yards on 494 attempts with 49 touchdowns. Pumphrey was rated as a three-star recruit by Rivals.com. He committed to San Diego State University to play college football.

== College career ==
As a true freshman in 2013, Pumphrey played in all 13 games, making one start. He finished second on the team behind Adam Muema with 752 rushing yards on 125 carries with eight touchdowns. After Muema entered the 2014 NFL draft, Pumphrey became the starter his sophomore year in 2014. He played in all 13 games and rushed for 1,876 on 276 carries with 20 touchdowns. The rushing yards broke the school record held by George Jones since 1995 and was the third best total in the nation behind Melvin Gordon of Wisconsin and Tevin Coleman of Indiana. Pumphrey rushed for an NCAA-leading 2,018 yards in the 2016 season. In the 2016 Las Vegas Bowl, he passed Ron Dayne of Wisconsin for the all-time Football Bowl Subdivision lead in career rushing yards. The claim was met with mixed reactions, as sportswriters questioned the validity of the record due to the NCAA's omission of bowl statistics accumulated by players prior to 2002.

=== Statistics ===
Legend
	NCAA record
	Led the NCAA
**Bold**	Career high

Season	Team	Games		Rushing					Receiving		
Season	Team	GP	GS	Att	Yds	Avg	Lng	TD	Rec	Yds	TD
2013	San Diego State	13	1	125	752	6.0	72	8	22	234	2
2014	San Diego State	13	13	276	1,867	**6.8**	**93**	**20**	23	160	0
2015	San Diego State	14	14	309	1,653	5.3	72	17	**28**	**416**	**3**
2016	San Diego State	14	14	**349**	**2,133**	6.1	79	16	27	231	0
Career		54	42	1,059	6,405	6.0	93	62	100	1,041	5

== Professional career ==
=== Pre-draft ===
On November 14, 2016, it was announced that Pumphrey had accepted an invitation to appear in the 2017 Senior Bowl. On January 28, 2017, Pumphrey played in the Senior Bowl and had four carries for 23 rushing yards, two receptions for 15 receiving yards, and returned four punts for a total of 44 yards to help Cleveland Browns head coach Hue Jackson's South team defeat the North 16–15. His 82 all-purpose yards finished second among the South team. He was one of 33 collegiate running backs to attend the NFL Scouting Combine in Indianapolis, Indiana. Pumphrey completed the majority of combine drills, but opted to skip the short shuttle and three-cone drill. Although he ran the fourth fastest 40-yard dash, his 4.48 was seen as a disappointment among scouts. He also weighed in as the lightest among his position group and the fifth shortest. On March 23, 2017, he attended San Diego State's pro day, along with Damontae Kazee, Nico Siragusa, Calvin Munson, and 10 other teammates. He opted to stand on his combine numbers and only performed positional drills and the bench press for scouts and team representatives from 29 NFL teams that attended. Pumphrey impressed scouts with his receiving out of the backfield and ability to run during running back drills. At the conclusion of the pre-draft process, Pumphrey was projected to be a fourth or fifth round pick by the majority of NFL draft experts and scouts. He was ranked as the 14th best running back prospect in the draft by NFLDraftScout.com.

Pre-draft measurables
Height	Weight	Arm length	Hand span	40-yard dash	10-yard split	20-yard split	Vertical jump	Broad jump	Bench press	Wonderlic
5 ft 8 1/4 in (1.73 m)	176 lb (80 kg)	29 in (0.74 m)	8 1/2 in (0.22 m)	4.48 s	1.54 s	2.61 s	33 1/2 in (0.85 m)	9 ft 9 in (2.97 m)	5 reps	21
All values from NFL Combine

=== Philadelphia Eagles (first stint) ===
The Philadelphia Eagles selected Pumphrey in the fourth round (132nd overall) of the 2017 NFL draft. He was the 12th running back selected and one of three San Diego State players chosen in the draft in 2017, along with Siragusa and Kazee. On May 11, 2017, the Eagles signed Pumphrey to a four-year, $2.97 million contract that includes a signing bonus of $575,888.

Throughout training camp, he competed against Darren Sproles, Byron Marshall, Wendell Smallwood, and Corey Clement for a role as backup running back. Head coach Doug Pederson named Pumphrey the fourth running back on the Eagles' depth chart to begin the regular season, behind LeGarrette Blount, Sproles, and Clement. On September 15, 2017, he was placed on injured reserve after suffering a torn hamstring in practice. Pumphrey missed his entire rookie season and did not log a snap or carry in 2017. The Eagles won Super Bowl LII against the New England Patriots 41–33, earning Pumphrey his first Super Bowl ring.

On September 1, 2018, Pumphrey was waived by the Eagles.

=== Detroit Lions ===
On September 5, 2018, Pumphrey was signed to the practice squad of the Detroit Lions. He was released on September 26, 2018.

=== Philadelphia Eagles (second stint) ===
On October 23, 2018, Pumphrey was signed to the Eagles practice squad. Pumphrey signed a reserve/future contract with the Eagles on January 14, 2019. He was waived during final roster cuts on August 30, 2019.

=== DC Defenders ===
Pumphrey was selected by the DC Defenders of the XFL in the 7th round in the 2020 XFL draft. He had his contract terminated when the league suspended operations on April 10, 2020.

== Coaching career ==
In 2022, Pumphrey joined San Diego State as a graduate assistant.

On February 9, 2023, Pumphrey was hired by Sacramento State University to serve as the team's running backs coach.

== See also ==
- List of NCAA Division I FBS career rushing touchdowns leaders
- List of NCAA Division I FBS career rushing yards leaders
- List of NCAA major college football yearly rushing leaders
