= Harvey Langi =

American football player (born 1992)

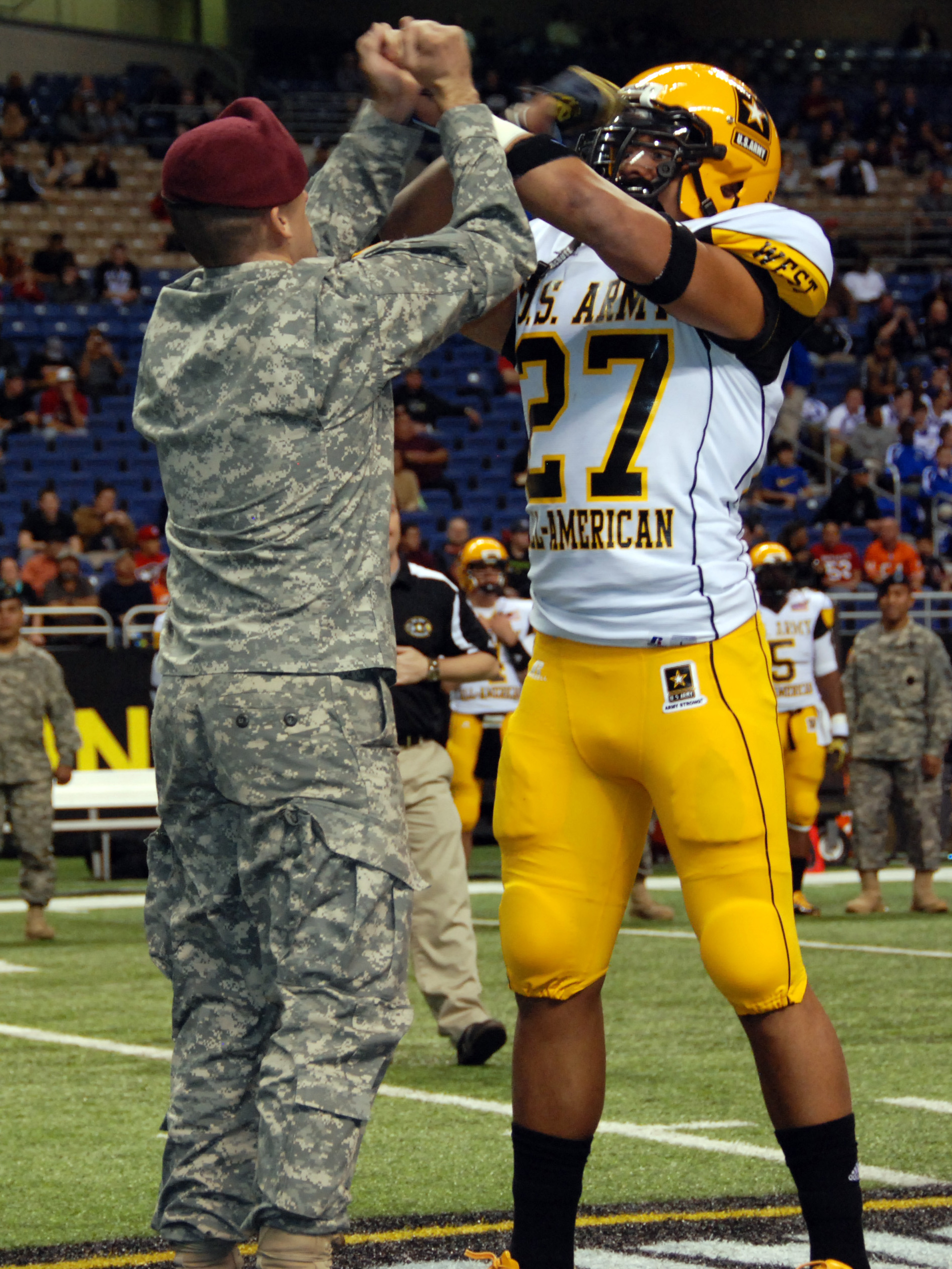
- Langi (right) at the 2011 U.S. Army All-American Bowl

No. 48, 44, 52, 43, 56
- Position: Linebacker

Personal information
- Born: September 24, 1992 (age 34); West Jordan, Utah, U.S.
- Listed height: 6 ft 2 in (1.88 m)
- Listed weight: 250 lb (113 kg)

Career information
- High school: Bingham (South Jordan, Utah)
- College: Utah (2011); BYU (2014–2016)
- NFL draft: 2017: undrafted

Career history
- New England Patriots (2017); New York Jets (2018–2020); New England Patriots (2021–2022); Denver Broncos (2022); Las Vegas Raiders (2022)

Career NFL statistics
- Total tackles: 92
- Fumble recoveries: 1
- Pass deflections: 2
- Stats at Pro Football Reference

Havea Hikuleo "Harvey" Langi (born September 24, 1992) is an American former professional football player who was a linebacker in the National Football League (NFL). He played college football for the BYU Cougars and was also a member of the New England Patriots, New York Jets, Denver Broncos, and Las Vegas Raiders.

== Professional career ==
On January 10, 2017, it was announced that Langi had accepted an invitation to appear in the Reese's Senior Bowl. On January 28, 2017, Langi attended the 2017 Senior Bowl and recorded three combined tackles and made the game-winning interception to help the South defeat the North 16-15. His game-winning interception came on a two-point conversion after a North touchdown. Pitt's Nathan Peterman's pass ricocheted off a defender and Langi ended up with the interception to seal the victory. He attended the NFL Combine, but was only able to perform the bench press, vertical jump, and broad jump due to an injured hamstring. On March 24, 2017, he participated at BYU's pro day, along with teammates Jamaal Williams, Taysom Hill, Kai Nacua, and 14 others. Team representatives and scouts from 26 NFL teams attended as Langi performed the 40-yard dash, 20-yard dash, 10-yard dash, short shuttle, and three-cone drill. Langi also performed positional drills, but opted to stand on his combine performance in the broad, vertical, and bench. He was projected to go as early as the fourth or fifth round, as late as the seventh, or become an undrafted free agent. Langi was ranked as the 13th best inside linebacker prospect in the draft by NFLDraftScout.com.

Pre-draft measurables
Height	Weight	Arm length	Hand span	40-yard dash	10-yard split	20-yard split	20-yard shuttle	Three-cone drill	Vertical jump	Broad jump	Bench press
6 ft 2 in (1.88 m)	251 lb (114 kg)	32 7/8 in (0.84 m)	9 1/8 in (0.23 m)	4.62 s	1.65 s	2.70 s	4.32 s	7.00 s	33.0 in (0.84 m)	9 ft 10 in (3.00 m)	23 reps
All values from NFL Combine/BYU's Pro Day

=== New England Patriots ===
On April 30, 2017, the New England Patriots signed Langi to a three-year, $1.68 million contract after he went undrafted in the 2017 NFL draft. The contract also includes a signing bonus of $15,000 and $100,000 guaranteed. Langi received more guaranteed money than the average sixth round pick and is on par with the average of a fifth round pick. The Patriots paid this amount mainly due to them only owning four draft picks and Langi being a highly sought after undrafted free agent who received 12 offers.

He competed with David Harris, Elandon Roberts, and Trevor Bates throughout training camp for the starting middle linebacker job. He was one of four undrafted free agents to survive final cuts and make the 53-man roster. Head coach Bill Belichick named Langi the third middle linebacker on the Patriots' depth chart, behind veterans Elandon Roberts and David Harris, to start his rookie season.

On September 17, 2017, Langi made his professional regular season debut at the New Orleans Saints and made his first career tackle in their 36-20 victory. On October 25, 2017, Langi was placed on the reserve/non-football injury list due to the injuries suffered in a serious car crash weeks prior. The Patriots made it to Super Bowl LII, but the team lost 41-33 to the Philadelphia Eagles.

On September 1, 2018, Langi was released as part of the roster cutdown.

=== New York Jets ===
Langi was signed to the New York Jets practice squad on October 1, 2018. He signed a reserve/future contract with the Jets on January 8, 2019.

Langi entered the 2020 season as a backup middle linebacker. He made his first start in Week 9, and started the next six games. On December 22, 2020, Langi was placed on injured reserve.

=== New England Patriots (second stint) ===
Langi signed with the New England Patriots on May 10, 2021. He suffered an MCL sprain in Week 7 and was placed on injured reserve on October 26, 2021.

On January 21, 2022, Langi signed a one-year contract extension with the Patriots. He was released on August 30, 2022 and signed to the practice squad the next day. After appearing in only 2 games Langi was released from the practice squad on October 3, 2022 ending his second stint with the Patriots.

=== Denver Broncos ===
On October 10, 2022, Langi was signed by the Denver Broncos to their practice squad. After appearing in only one game he was released on December 20.

=== Las Vegas Raiders ===
On December 21, 2022, Langi was signed to the Las Vegas Raiders' practice squad. He was promoted to the active roster on December 28.

== Personal life ==
Younger brother, Lolani Langi, committed to play football at Washington State University after serving a 2-year mission for the Church of Jesus Christ of Latter-day Saints after initially committing to Boise State University in 2019. Lolani was a 2019 class recruit who was looking at challenging for early playing time as a 3 star recruit and top 50 outside linebacker with good size, however he delayed entry to serve an LDS mission.

On October 13, 2017, Langi and his wife, Cassidy, were rear-ended at a stop light and were both seriously injured. The driver, Kevin M. Conroy, was later charged with felony possession of a Class E substance, negligent operation of a motor vehicle, possession of an open container or alcohol, and a marked lane violation. The Foxborough police found three different prescription drugs in the vehicle, including a pain killer, antipsychotic, and a muscle relaxant. Conroy and his passenger were uninjured when they rear-ended Langi's car while going 50 mph in an accident that pinned Langi's vehicle between Conroy's Jeep and the car in front. The accident also caused injuries to three people in a car in front of Langi. Langi suffered injuries to his head, neck, and back while his wife Cassidy broke both hips and multiple ribs. Conroy passed a breathalyzer and claimed all the medications were prescribed.
