= Rees Odhiambo =

Kenyan gridiron football player (born 1992)

No. 63, 70
- Position: Offensive guard

Personal information
- Born: September 23, 1992 (age 34); Nairobi, Kenya
- Listed height: 6 ft 4 in (1.93 m)
- Listed weight: 297 lb (135 kg)

Career information
- High school: Mansfield Legacy (Mansfield, Texas, U.S.)
- College: Boise State
- NFL draft: 2016: 3rd round, 97th overall pick

Career history
- Seattle Seahawks (2016–2017); Indianapolis Colts (2018)*; Atlanta Falcons (2018); Indianapolis Colts (2018)*; Arizona Cardinals (2018)
- * Offseason or practice squad member only

Awards and highlights
- First-team All-MWC (2015); Second-team All-MWC (2014)

Career NFL statistics
- Games played: 16
- Games started: 7
- Stats at Pro Football Reference

Rees Odhiambo (/ˌɒdiˈɑːmboʊ/ OD-ee-AHM-boh; born September 23, 1992) is a Kenyan former professional player of American football who was an offensive guard in the National Football League (NFL). He played college football for the Boise State Broncos. He was selected by the Seattle Seahawks in the third round of the 2016 NFL draft. Odhiambo was also a member of the Indianapolis Colts, Atlanta Falcons, and Arizona Cardinals.

== Early life ==
Born in Nairobi, Kenya, to parents George and Evelyn Odhiambo, he moved to Texas at the age of seven, shortly after his father's death. Odhiambo's mother died ten years later when he was 17, and he lived with an uncle and rode to school every day with an assistant coach. He has one sibling, a younger sister named Evette.

Odhiambo attended Legacy High School in Mansfield, a suburb southwest of Dallas. He began playing football as a sophomore, after being asked to turn out by an assistant coach who had him in a P.E. class. Odhiambo earned two letters in football (and another in track and field) and graduated in 2011. Boise State was his sole scholarship offer, then led by head coach Chris Petersen.

== College career ==
Odhiambo committed to Boise State prior to his senior year in July 2010 and signed his letter of intent on February 2, 2011. As a true freshman, he redshirted in 2011, and was awarded the Ultimate Goon Award by Tim Socha, BSU's head strength coach. Odhiambo played the next four seasons (2012–2015) for the Broncos and appeared in 32 games. His final two seasons were played under head coach Bryan Harsin, who arrived in 2014.

== Professional career ==
Pre-draft measurables
Height	Weight	Arm length	Hand span	20-yard shuttle	Three-cone drill	Vertical jump	Broad jump	Bench press
6 ft 4 in (1.93 m)	314 lb (142 kg)	33 1/4	9 5/8	4.64 s	8.02 s	27 in (0.69 m)	7 ft 9 in (2.36 m)	23 reps
Values from NFL Combine and pro day.

=== Seattle Seahawks ===
Odhiambo was selected by the Seattle Seahawks in the third round of the 2016 NFL draft, the 97th overall pick. A week later on May 6, he signed a four-year deal worth $2.9 million overall with a $645,416 bonus. Backed up against their own endzone during the divisional round of the 2016-17 NFL playoffs, Odhiambo accidentally stepped on the foot of Seahawks quarterback Russell Wilson, causing a safety.

Odhiambo entered the 2017 season as the Seahawks' starting left tackle. He started the first seven games before suffering multiple dislocated fingers in both hands. His injuries required surgery on both hands, and he was placed on injured reserve on November 8, 2017.

On September 2, 2018, Odhiambo was waived by the Seahawks.

=== Indianapolis Colts (first stint) ===
On September 24, 2018, Odhiambo was signed to the practice squad of the Indianapolis Colts.

=== Atlanta Falcons ===
On October 24, 2018, Odhiambo was signed by the Atlanta Falcons off the Colts' practice squad. He was waived on November 12, 2018.

=== Indianapolis Colts (second stint) ===
On November 14, 2018, Odhiambo was signed to the Colts' practice squad.

=== Arizona Cardinals ===
On December 3, 2018, Odhiambo was signed by the Arizona Cardinals off the Colts' practice squad.

Odhiambo was waived/injured during final roster cuts on August 31, 2019, and reverted to injured reserve the next day. He was waived from injured reserve with an injury settlement on September 5.

== Personal life ==
Odhiambo graduated from Boise State in December 2015, with a bachelor's degree in exercise science.

On July 31, 2018, Odhiambo became a U.S. citizen after taking his oath at the Tukwila U.S. immigration center.
