= Nico Siragusa =

American football player (born 1994)

No. 65, 56, 66, 71
- Position: Offensive guard

Personal information
- Born: May 10, 1994 (age 32); San Diego, California, U.S.
- Listed height: 6 ft 4 in (1.93 m)
- Listed weight: 330 lb (150 kg)

Career information
- High school: Mater Dei (Chula Vista, California)
- College: San Diego State
- NFL draft: 2017: 4th round, 122nd overall pick

Career history
- Baltimore Ravens (2017–2018); Green Bay Packers (2018); Indianapolis Colts (2019)*; Buffalo Bills (2019)*; Los Angeles Wildcats (2020)
- * Offseason or practice squad member only

Awards and highlights
- First-team All-American (2016); 2× First-team All-MWC (2015, 2016)
- Stats at Pro Football Reference

Nicolas Angel Siragusa (born May 10, 1994) is an American former professional football player who was an offensive guard in the National Football League (NFL). He played college football for the San Diego State Aztecs, and was selected by the Baltimore Ravens in the fourth round of the 2017 NFL draft.

== Early life ==
A native of San Diego, Siragusa attended Mater Dei High School in Chula Vista, California, where he only played two years of varsity football after playing baseball and basketball during his freshman and second years.

Regarded as a three-star recruit by ESPN, Siragusa was ranked as the No. 102 offensive tackle in a 2012 class highlighted by D. J. Humphries and Andrus Peat. Siragusa committed to his home-town San Diego State Aztecs over offers from Fresno State, New Mexico State, San José State, and others.

== College career ==
Siragusa was a four-year starter at San Diego State. On November 14, 2016, it was announced that Siragusa had accepted an invitation to appear in the 2017 Senior Bowl. He attended the Senior Bowl, but suffered a thumb injury on the first day of practice that sidelined him for the rest of the week and the Reese's Senior Bowl game.

== Professional career ==
Pre-draft measurables
Height	Weight	Arm length	Hand span	40-yard dash	10-yard split	20-yard split	20-yard shuttle	Three-cone drill	Vertical jump	Broad jump	Bench press
6 ft 4 in (1.93 m)	319 lb (145 kg)	33 1/2 in (0.85 m)	10 5/8 in (0.27 m)	5.35 s	1.83 s	3.04 s	4.56 s	7.71 s	32 in (0.81 m)	9 ft 2 in (2.79 m)	28 reps
All values from NFL Combine

=== Baltimore Ravens ===
The Baltimore Ravens selected Siragusa in the fourth round (122nd overall) of the 2017 NFL draft. He was the sixth guard and eighth interior offensive lineman, as well as one of three San Diego State products (along with Donnel Pumphrey and Damontae Kazee) selected in 2017. On May 5, 2017, the Ravens signed Siragusa to a four-year, $3.02 million contract, including a $628,379 signing bonus. However, during a training camp practice on August 1, Siragusa tore his ACL, MCL, and PCL. He was placed on injured reserve on September 1, 2017, ending his rookie season before it began.

On September 1, 2018, the Ravens waived Siragusa during final roster cuts and resigned him to the practice squad the next day.

=== Green Bay Packers ===
On December 12, 2018, the Green Bay Packers signed Siragusa off the Ravens' practice squad and added him to their active roster after placing Byron Bell on injured reserve. He was waived on April 29, 2019.

=== Indianapolis Colts ===
On June 4, 2019, Siragusa signed with the Indianapolis Colts. He was waived on July 24, 2019.

=== Buffalo Bills ===
On August 1, 2019, Siragusa signed with the Buffalo Bills, but was waived nine days later.

=== Los Angeles Wildcats ===
Siragusa was drafted by the Los Angeles Wildcats of the XFL in the 6th round in phase two of the 2020 XFL draft. He had his contract terminated when the league suspended operations on April 10, 2020.

== Personal life ==
Despite his surname and the team that drafted him, Nico is not related to former Ravens defensive tackle Tony Siragusa. His parents are Ramon and Dianne Siragusa.
