= Damontae Kazee =

American football player (born 1993)

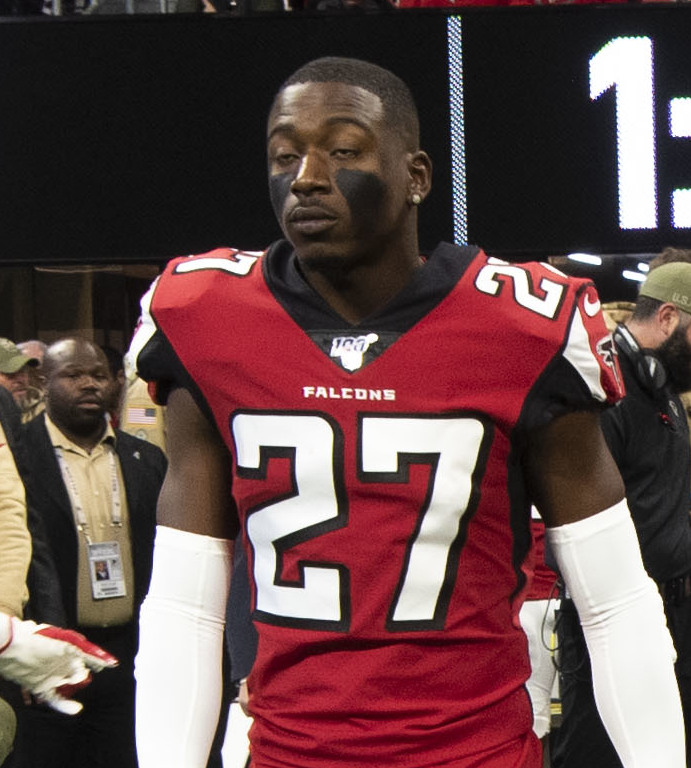
- Kazee with the Atlanta Falcons in 2019

Profile
- Position: Safety

Personal information
- Born: June 5, 1993 (age 33); San Bernardino, California, U.S.
- Listed height: 5 ft 11 in (1.80 m)
- Listed weight: 174 lb (79 kg)

Career information
- High school: Cajon (San Bernardino)
- College: San Diego State (2012–2016)
- NFL draft: 2017: 5th round, 149th overall pick

Career history
- Atlanta Falcons (2017–2020); Dallas Cowboys (2021); Pittsburgh Steelers (2022–2024); Cleveland Browns (2025); Detroit Lions (2025)*
- * Offseason or practice squad member only

Awards and highlights
- NFL interceptions co-leader (2018); 2× MW Defensive Player of the Year (2015, 2016); 2× First-team All-MW (2015, 2016); Second-team All-MW (2014)

Career NFL statistics as of 2025
- Total tackles: 363
- Forced fumbles: 7
- Fumble recoveries: 2
- Pass deflections: 24
- Interceptions: 17
- Stats at Pro Football Reference

Damontae Tyron Kazee (born June 5, 1993) is an American professional football safety. He was selected by the Atlanta Falcons in the fifth round of the 2017 NFL draft. He played college football at San Diego State.

== Early life ==
Kazee attended Cajon, where he was a two-way player at cornerback and running back. As a senior in 2011, he registered 27 tackles, 2 interceptions, one forced fumble, 4 rushing touchdowns and 4 receiving touchdowns. He was a three-time All-CIF selection.

He also lettered in basketball and track.

== College career ==
Kazee accepted a football scholarship from San Diego State, following in the footsteps of his older brother Walter, who was a running back with the Aztecs.

As a redshirt freshman he appeared in 13 games as a backup cornerback, missing the eighth against the University of New Mexico with a concussion. He made 41 tackles (3 for loss), one interception, 2 pass breakups, one sack, 4 forced fumbles (tied for fourth in school history) and one blocked kick. He had 4 and one tackle against the Eastern Illinois University. He made 6 tackles and one interception against Ohio State University. He had 5 tackles and one forced fumble against Oregon State University.

As a sophomore, he started all 13 games at cornerback, posting 58 tackles (4 for loss), one 13 pass breakups (led the team), one fumble recovery and 2 quarterback hurries. He had four tackles (three solo) and 3 pass breakups against UNLV. He made 5 tackles against Fresno State University. He had 5 tackles and 2 pass breakups against the University of New Mexico. He made 6 tackles, 2 pass breakups and one interception against the University of Hawaiʻi at Mānoa. He had 7 tackles, one pass breakup and one quarterback pressure against Boise State University.

As a junior, he started 14 games at cornerback, collecting 75 tackles (5.5 for loss), 58 solo tackles (led the team), 8 interceptions (second in school history), 7 pass breakups and 2 forced fumbles. He had 3 tackles (2 for loss) and 3 interceptions (tied for second in school history) against the University of San Diego. He made 7 tackles and one pass breakup against the University of California. He had 11 tackles (10 solo), one pass breakup and one forced fumble against the University of South Alabama. He made 8 tackles (0.5 for loss) against Penn State University. He made 9 tackles (one for loss) and one interception against San Jose State University. He had 7 tackles, one interception returned for a touchdown and one forced fumble against Colorado State University.

As a senior, he started 14 games at cornerback, registering 65 tackles (3 for loss), 7 interceptions (fourth in school history), one interception returned for a touchdown, 156 interception return yards (second in the conference), 8 pass breakups and one quarterback hurry. He set a school record for career interceptions (17) and became the first player in school history with 6 or more interceptions in consecutive seasons. He had 6 tackles, 3 pass breakups and one interception against the University of California. He made 5 tackles, one interception and one quarterback hurry against Northern Illinois University. He had 5 tackles and one interception at Fresno State University. He had 4 tackles, 2 interceptions (one returned for a touchdown) and one pass breakup against the University of Hawaiʻi at Mānoa.

== Professional career ==
=== Pre-draft ===
On November 14, 2016, it was announced that Kazee accepted his invitation to appear in the 2017 Senior Bowl. On January 28, 2017, he appeared in the Senior Bowl and helped Cleveland Browns head coach Hue Jackson's South team defeat the North 16–15. His overall performance impressed scouts and raised his draft stock. He was one of 35 collegiate cornerbacks to receive an invitation to the NFL Scouting Combine in Indianapolis, Indiana. He performed the majority of combine drills, but opted to skip the short shuttle and three-cone drill.

On March 23, 2017, he attended San Diego State's Pro Day, but opted to stand on his combine numbers and performed positional drills, the short shuttle, and three-cone drills for scouts and team representatives from 29 NFL teams that attended, including Los Angeles Chargers defensive coordinator Gus Bradley. At the conclusion of the pre-draft process, Kazee was projected to be a fourth or fifth round pick by the majority of NFL draft experts and scouts. He was ranked as the 22nd best cornerback prospect in the draft by NFLDraftScout.com.

Pre-draft measurables
Height	Weight	Arm length	Hand span	40-yard dash	10-yard split	20-yard split	20-yard shuttle	Three-cone drill	Vertical jump	Broad jump	Bench press
5 ft 10 1/4 in (1.78 m)	184 lb (83 kg)	30 7/8 in (0.78 m)	8 5/8 in (0.22 m)	4.54 s	1.60 s	2.65 s	4.27 s	7.11 s	34 in (0.86 m)	10 ft 4 in (3.15 m)	11 reps
All values from NFL Combine

=== Atlanta Falcons ===
==== 2017 ====
Kazee was selected by the Atlanta Falcons in the fifth round (149th overall) of the 2017 NFL draft. On May 9, 2017, the Falcons signed Kazee to a four-year, $2.68 million contract with a signing bonus of $288,922.

Kazee entered training camp competing against Brian Poole for the starting nickel back role. Head coach Dan Quinn opted to transition him to free safety in July and Kazee showed promise throughout training camp in his new role. He was named the backup free safety to Ricardo Allen to start the 2017 season.

He made his professional regular season debut in the Falcons' season-opener at the Chicago Bears and made two solo tackles and forced a fumble in their 23–17 victory. On October 1, 2017, Kazee earned his first career start after Ricardo Allen was unable to play after suffering a concussion the previous week. He finished the Falcons' 23–17 loss to the Buffalo Bills with a season-high nine combined tackles and a forced fumble. He finished the season with 23 combined tackles (14 solo) and two forced fumbles in one start and 16 games.

==== 2018 ====
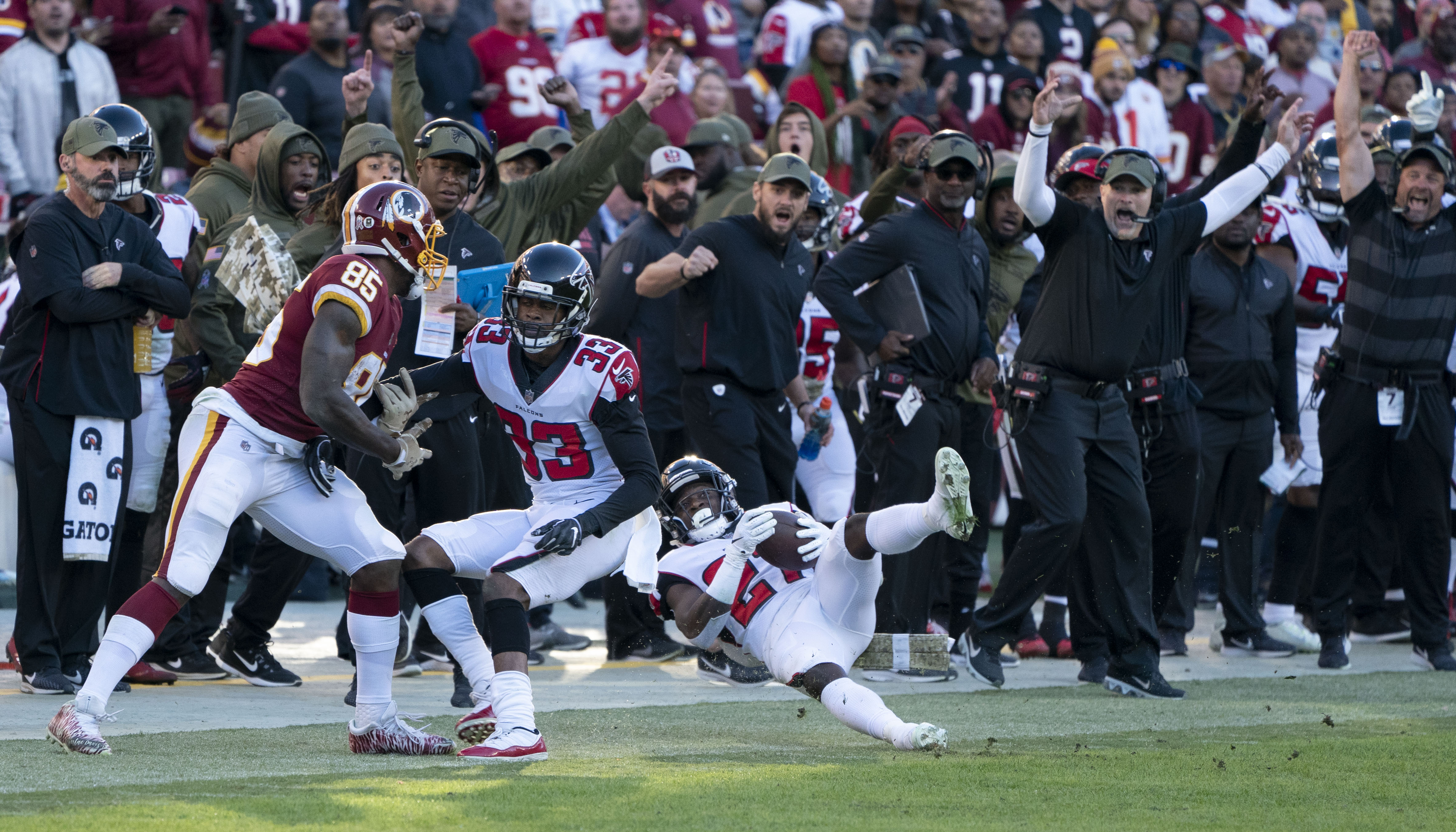
Kazee catching an interception against the Washington Redskins in 2018.

Kazee entered the 2018 season as the backup strong safety to Keanu Neal. He was named the starter following a season-ending injury to Neal in Week 1. During Week 2 against the Carolina Panthers, Kazee was ejected for making a helmet-to-helmet hit on Cam Newton. The Falcons won 31–24. In Week 3, he recorded a season-high 10 combined tackles. Kazee ended the 2018 season third on the team with 82 combined tackles, and tied for the league lead with seven interceptions with Kyle Fuller and Xavien Howard.

==== 2019 ====
In Week 11 against the Carolina Panthers, Kazee recorded his first interception of the season off a pass thrown by Kyle Allen in the 29–3 win. In Week 14 against the Panthers, Kazee forced a fumble on wide receiver Greg Dortch during a kickoff return which was recovered by kicker Younghoe Koo and recorded 2 more interceptions off passes thrown by Kyle Allen during the 40–20 win. Kazee finished the 2019 season with 74 combined tackles, three interceptions, and one forced fumble.

==== 2020 ====
In week 4 of the 2020 NFL season against the Green Bay Packers, Kazee tore his Achilles' tendon, ending his season. He finished the season with 20 tackles and 1 forced fumble. He was placed on injured reserve on October 7, 2020. He finished his career with the Falcons with 199 tackles, 10 interceptions, 13 pass breakups and 5 forced fumbles.

=== Dallas Cowboys ===
On March 29, 2021, Kazee signed as a free agent with the Dallas Cowboys, reuniting with defensive coordinator Dan Quinn, who was his head coach with the Falcons. He was able to recover from his Achilles injury and begin participating in the organized team activities. He appeared in 17 games with 15 starts at free safety, making 54 defensive tackles, 2 interceptions, 2 passes defensed, 2 forced fumbles and 2 special teams tackles. He also started in the playoff game against the San Francisco 49ers, collecting 9 tackles.

=== Pittsburgh Steelers ===
On May 3, 2022, Kazee signed a one-year contract with the Pittsburgh Steelers. He suffered a fractured forearm in the preseason and was placed on the injured reserve on September 1, 2022. He was suspended three games for a violation of the NFL's substance abuse policy on September 21, 2022. He was activated on November 10. He appeared in 9 games with 4 starts (two due to injury and two in the three-safety package), while registering 19 tackles, 2 interceptions and 2 passes defensed.

On March 14, 2023, Kazee signed a two-year contract extension with the Steelers.

During the Week 15 game against the Indianapolis Colts, Kazee was ejected from the game in the second quarter for making a hit to Colts wide receiver Michael Pittman Jr.'s head while Pittman was trying to make a catch, which resulted in a 15-yard penalty and Pittman being ruled out for the rest of the game with a concussion. On December 18, the NFL announced that Kazee would be suspended for the remainder of the 2023 season. After submitting an appeal, the NFL upheld the suspension but would allow Kazee to play in the playoffs for the Steelers should they make it in.

=== Cleveland Browns ===
On May 12, 2025, Kazee signed with the Cleveland Browns. In four games for the Browns, he recorded no tackles. Kazee was released by Cleveland on November 3.

=== Detroit Lions ===
On December 8, 2025, Kazee was signed to the Detroit Lions' practice squad.

== Personal life ==
On October 19, 2021, Kazee was arrested and charged with driving while under the influence after he was pulled over for a traffic violation in The Colony, Texas.

== NFL career statistics ==
Legend
	Led the league
**Bold**	Career high

=== Regular season ===
Year	Team	Games		Tackles					Interceptions						Fumbles			
Year	Team	GP	GS	Cmb	Solo	Ast	Sck	TfL	PD	Int	Yds	Avg	Lng	TD	FF	FR	Yds	TD
2017	ATL	16	1	23	14	9	0.0	0	0	0	0	0.0	0	0	**2**	0	0	0
2018	ATL	16	15	**82**	**60**	22	0.0	1	**10**	**7**	**54**	7.7	**33**	0	1	0	0	0
2019	ATL	16	14	74	46	**28**	0.0	**2**	3	3	53	17.7	22	0	1	0	0	0
2020	ATL	4	4	20	17	3	0.0	0	0	0	0	0.0	0	0	1	0	0	0
2021	DAL	17	15	52	35	17	0.0	0	4	2	8	4.0	8	0	**2**	0	0	0
2022	PIT	9	4	20	11	9	0.0	0	2	2	14	7.0	12	0	0	0	0	0
2023	PIT	14	9	61	46	15	0.0	0	3	2	37	**18.5**	30	0	0	**2**	1	0
2024	PIT	15	1	31	22	9	0.0	0	2	1	5	5.0	5	0	0	0	0	0
2025	CLE	4	0	0	0	0	0.0	0	0	0	0	0	0	0	0	0	0	0
Career		111	63	363	251	112	0.0	3	24	17	171	10.0	33	0	7	2	1	0
