= Kivon Cartwright =

American football player (born 1992)

Profile
- Position: Tight end

Personal information
- Born: March 3, 1992 (age 34); Oahu, Hawaii, U.S.
- Listed height: 6 ft 4 in (1.93 m)
- Listed weight: 245 lb (111 kg)

Career information
- High school: Pueblo (CO) South
- College: Colorado State (2010–2015)
- NFL draft: 2016: undrafted

Career history
- Tampa Bay Buccaneers (2016–2017)*
- * Offseason or practice squad member only
- Stats at Pro Football Reference

Kivon DeAnte Cartwright (born March 3, 1992) is an American former professional football tight end. He played college football at Colorado State.

== Professional career ==
Cartwright signed a reserve/future contract with the Buccaneers on January 4, 2017. On May 1, 2017, he was waived by the Buccaneers.
