= 2016 Akron Zips football team =

American college football season

2016 Akron Zips football
- Conference: Mid-American Conference
- East Division
- Record: 5–7 (3–5 MAC)
- Head coach: Terry Bowden (5th season)
- Offensive coordinator: A. J. Milwee (4th season)
- Offensive scheme: Spread
- Defensive coordinator: Chuck Amato (5th season)
- Base defense: 4–3
- Home stadium: InfoCision Stadium–Summa Field

2016 Mid-American Conference football standings
	Conf.			Overall
Team	W		L	W		L
East Division
Ohio xy	6	–	2	8	–	6
Miami (OH) x	6	–	2	6	–	7
Akron	3	–	5	5	–	7
Bowling Green	3	–	5	4	–	8
Kent State	2	–	6	3	–	9
Buffalo	1	–	7	2	–	10
West Division
No. 15 Western Michigan xy$	8	–	0	13	–	1
Toledo	6	–	2	9	–	4
Northern Illinois	5	–	3	5	–	7
Eastern Michigan	4	–	4	7	–	6
Central Michigan	3	–	5	6	–	7
Ball State	1	–	7	4	–	8
Championship: Western Michigan 29, Ohio 23
$ – Conference champion; x – Division champion/co-champions; y – Championship game participant; Rankings from AP Poll

The 2016 Akron Zips football team represented the University of Akron in the 2016 NCAA Division I FBS football season. They were led by fifth-year head coach Terry Bowden and played their home games at InfoCision Stadium–Summa Field. They were members of the East Division of the Mid-American Conference. They finished the season 5–7, 3–5 in MAC play to finish in a tie for third place in the East Division.

== Schedule ==
Date	Time	Opponent	Site	TV	Result	Attendance
September 3	6:30 p.m.	VMI*	InfoCision Stadium–Summa Field; Akron, OH	ESPN3	W 47–24	11,061
September 10	3:30 p.m.	at No. 10 Wisconsin*	Camp Randall Stadium; Madison, WI	BTN	L 10–54	77,331
September 17	12:00 p.m.	at Marshall*	Joan C. Edwards Stadium; Huntington, WV	CBSSN	W 65–38	24,258
September 24	3:30 p.m.	Appalachian State*	InfoCision Stadium–Summa Field; Akron, OH	ASN	L 38–45	15,381
October 1	3:30 p.m.	at Kent State	Dix Stadium; Kent, OH (Wagon Wheel)	ESPN3	W 31–27	20,167
October 8	3:00 p.m.	Miami (OH)^{†}	InfoCision Stadium–Summa Field; Akron, OH	ESPN3	W 35–13	11,094
October 15	3:30 p.m.	No. 24 Western Michigan	InfoCision Stadium–Summa Field; Akron, OH	CBSSN	L 0–41	11,321
October 22	3:00 p.m.	at Ball State	Scheumann Stadium; Muncie, IN	ESPN3	W 35–25	10,739
October 27	7:30 p.m.	at Buffalo	University at Buffalo Stadium; Amherst, NY	BCSN	L 20–41	15,012
November 2	7:30 p.m.	Toledo	InfoCision Stadium–Summa Field; Akron, OH	ESPN2	L 17–48	6,559
November 9	8:00 p.m.	Bowling Green	InfoCision Stadium–Summa Field; Akron, OH	ESPNU	L 28–38	6,605
November 22	7:00 p.m.	at Ohio	Peden Stadium; Athens, OH	ESPNU	L 3–9	18,025
*Non-conference game; ^{†}Homecoming; Rankings from AP Poll released prior to the game; All times are in Eastern time

== Game summaries ==
=== VMI ===
	1	2	3	4	Total
Keydets	7	3	14	0	24
Zips	12	7	7	21	47

=== At Wisconsin ===
	1	2	3	4	Total
Zips	0	10	0	0	10
#10 Badgers	9	21	10	14	54

=== At Marshall ===
	1	2	3	4	Total
Zips	7	34	7	17	65
Thundering Herd	21	0	10	7	38

=== Appalachian State ===
	1	2	3	4	Total
Mountaineers	10	21	7	7	45
Zips	0	14	10	14	38

=== At Kent State ===
	1	2	3	4	Total
Zips	3	7	7	14	31
Golden Flashes	7	10	0	10	27

=== Miami (OH) ===
	1	2	3	4	Total
RedHawks	3	3	7	0	13
Zips	14	7	7	7	35

=== Western Michigan ===
	1	2	3	4	Total
#24 Broncos	14	13	7	7	41
Zips	0	0	0	0	0

=== At Ball State ===
	1	2	3	4	Total
Zips	0	7	14	14	35
Cardinals	7	10	0	8	25

=== At Buffalo ===
	1	2	3	4	Total
Zips	3	7	3	7	20
Bulls	3	17	0	21	41

=== Toledo ===
	1	2	3	4	Total
Rockets	3	17	14	14	48
Zips	10	0	7	0	17

=== Bowling Green ===
	1	2	3	4	Total
Falcons	7	14	7	10	38
Zips	0	10	10	8	28

=== At Ohio ===
	1	2	3	4	Total
Zips	0	0	3	0	3
Bobcats	0	6	0	3	9

== Roster ==
2016 Akron Zips football team roster
Players
Coaches
Offense

Pos.	#	Name	Class
QB	1	Kato Nelson	Fr
WR	2	Tyrell Goodman	Sr
WR	3	Kwadarrius Smith	So
QB	4	Tommy Woodson	Jr
QB	5	Tra'Von Chapman	Jr
WR	7	Jerome Lane	Jr
WR	8	Kevin Gladney	Jr
WR	9	JoJo Natson	Sr
TE	10	Mykel Traylor-Bennett	Jr
QB	10	Clayton Uecker	Jr
WR	11	A. J. Coney	Jr
WR	12	Imani Davis	Sr
WR	13	Fransohn Bickley	Jr
QB	15	Matthew Hoyer	Sr
ATH	16	Jaquavis Dixon	Fr
WR	17	Anthony Young	Jr
WR	19	Anthony Lauro	So
WR	21	Michael Means	Sr
RB	23	Van Edwards	So
RB	25	Denzel Jones	Sr
RB	28	Manny Morgan	Jr
RB	30	Chuck Turfe	Fr
RB	34	Warren Ball	Sr
TE	35	Newman Williams	So
WR	36	Isaiah Rainey-Nix	So
WR	38	Ibrahim Mohammed	Sr
WR	39	Jason Grossman	Fr
FB	43	Christian Allen	Sr
TE	45	Brandon Junk	Fr
WR	48	Darian Williams	Sr
OL	50	Undrea Bullard	So
OL, TE	52	LaVonne Gauthney	Jr
OL	56	Brandon Council	Fr
OL	57	Stephen Ericksen	Jr
OL	59	Trevor Brown	Fr
OL	60	Josh Snow	Fr
OL	63	Nick Fazio	So
OL	66	Kyle Ritz	So
OL	68	Andrew Siegman	Fr
OL	69	Ryan Kortokrax	Jr
OL	72	Logan Tuley-Tillman	Jr
OL	73	Jonathan Neeley	Fr
OL	74	Xavier Quigley	Jr
OL	75	Jovann Letuli	Jr
OL	76	Rich Kallay	Fr
OL	77	Cedric McCoy	Jr
OL	78	Austin Sample	Fr
OL	79	Montel Jordan	Fr
WR	80	Bryce Dixon	Fr
WR	81	Brandon Mitchell	So
WR	82	Austin Wolf	Jr
TE	83	Michael Kish	Jr
TE	84	Avery Cagle	Fr
WR	85	Freddie Simmons	Fr

Defense

Pos.	#	Name	Class
CB	1	Alvin Davis	Fr
DB	2	Larry Hope	Sr
LB	2	James King (I)	So
LB	3	DeMarkus Glover	Fr
DL	4	Davon'te Jest	Fr
LB	5	Ulysees Gilbert III	So
CB	6	DeAndre Scott	Sr
DL	8	Darius Copeland	Jr
LB	9	Jamal Davis	So
LB	10	Brian Bell	So
LB	11	John Rachal	Sr
CB	12	Kyron Brown	Fr
DL	13	Christopher Spruill	Sr
S	14	James Turner	Sr
S	15	Cory Morrow	Sr
LB	16	DeMarcus Lloyd	Jr
DB	17	Bryce Jones	Sr
S	18	Tyler Gilchrist	Fr
ATH	19	Vince Lockett	Fr
DE	19	Daumantuas Venckus	Sr
DE	20	Shawn Featherstone	So
DB	21	Michael Butler	Sr
CB	22	Mikee Hayes	Jr
DB	23	Nathan Bischof	So
DB	24	Jordan George	So
LB	25	Travonte Junius	So
CB	26	Darian Dailey	So
CB	28	Mark Ellis	Fr
S	31	Jamal Baggett	So
S	32	Zach Guiser	Jr
DL	34	Jamal Marcus	Sr
DB	38	Denzel Butler (I)	So
LB	40	John Lako	Fr
LB	42	Youssef Barakat	Fr
LB	42	Andrew Hauser	Jr
DB	46	Zachary Sweat	Sr
DL	50	Brock Boxen	So
S	51	Devon Jones	Fr
LB	52	Josh Ward	Fr
LB	55	Tony Jones	Jr
DE	56	Deon'Tae Moore	Jr
DL	65	Andy Jean-Baptiste	Fr
DL	90	Se'Von Pittman	Sr
DL	91	Ibrahima Camara	Jr
DL	94	Brian Reinke	So
DL	97	Brennan Williams	So
DL	99	Jelani Hamilton	Sr

Special teams

Pos.	#	Name	Class
PK	37	Tom O'Leary	So
PK	39	Zach Gingerich	Jr
P	41	Kyle Foster	So
PK, P	44	Jon Semerene	Jr
PK, P	47	Jerry Fitschen	Fr
PK, P	49	James Fonseca	So
PK, P	60	Nick Gasser	So
LS	65	Hayden Grover	So
LS	88	Michael Buddenberg	Jr

Head coach

- Terry Bowden

Coordinators/assistant coaches

- Chuck Amato (Associate head coach / defensive coordinator)
- Todd Stroud (assistant head coach / defensive line / recruiting coordinator)
- A. J. Milwee (offensive coordinator / quarterbacks)
- Jeff Bowden (special teams coordinator / wide receivers)
- Trent Boykin (Tight Ends / H-Backs)
- Brett Ekkens (offensive line)
- Erick Hickson (running backs)
- Otis Mounds (Cornerbacks / defensive passing game coordinator)
- Mike Woodford (Safeties)
- Hunter Bowden (offensive graduate assistant)
- Tim Hargrett (offensive graduate assistant)
- Kory Gribbin (defensive graduate assistant)
- Nick Verna (defensive graduate assistant)
- Ben Murphy (Director of football operations)
- John Nemec (Director of player personnel)
- Mark Ouimet (assistant director of football operations)

Legend

- (C) Team captain
- (S) Suspended
- (I) Ineligible
- Injured
- Redshirt

Roster
Last update: December 21, 2016
