= 2016 Mid-American Conference football season =

- League: NCAA Division I Football Bowl Subdivision
- Sport: Football
- Duration: September 2016 – December 2016
- Teams: 12

2017 NFL Draft
- Top draft pick: Corey Davis (Western Michigan)
- Picked by: Tennessee Titans, 5th overall

Regular Season
- Season MVP: Corey Davis
- Top scorer: Butch Hampton (128 points)
- East Division champions: Ohio Bobcats
- Western Division champions: Western Michigan Broncos

MAC Championship Game
- Champions: Western Michigan

Football seasons
- 2015 2017

2016 Mid-American Conference football standings
	Conf.			Overall
Team	W		L	W		L
East Division
Ohio xy	6	–	2	8	–	6
Miami (OH) x	6	–	2	6	–	7
Akron	3	–	5	5	–	7
Bowling Green	3	–	5	4	–	8
Kent State	2	–	6	3	–	9
Buffalo	1	–	7	2	–	10
West Division
No. 15 Western Michigan xy$	8	–	0	13	–	1
Toledo	6	–	2	9	–	4
Northern Illinois	5	–	3	5	–	7
Eastern Michigan	4	–	4	7	–	6
Central Michigan	3	–	5	6	–	7
Ball State	1	–	7	4	–	8
Championship: Western Michigan 29, Ohio 23
$ – Conference champion; x – Division champion/co-champions; y – Championship game participant; Rankings from AP Poll

The 2016 Mid-American Conference football season was the 71st season for the Mid-American Conference (MAC) and was part of the 2016 NCAA Division I FBS football season.

== Preseason ==
=== Preseason poll ===
On July 28, 2016, the conference held its MAC Football Media Day. A poll of the league's media members was conducted. Western Michigan and Bowling Green were chosen to win their respective divisions while Western Michigan was predicted to win the MAC Championship game.

==== East Division ====
Rank	Team
1	Bowling Green (12)
2	Ohio (10)
3	Akron (4)
4	Buffalo
5	Miami
6	Kent State
(first place votes)

==== West Division ====
Rank	Team
1	Western Michigan (19)
2	Toledo (2)
3	Northern Illinois (3)
4	Central Michigan (2)
5	Ball State
6	Eastern Michigan
(first place votes)

==== MAC Championship Game winner ====
Rank	Team
1	Western Michigan (19)
2	Toledo (2)
2	Northern Illinois (2)
3	Central Michigan (1)
3	Bowling Green (1)
3	Akron (1)

== Head coaches ==
East Division

West Division

== Postseason awards ==
=== 2016 MAC Specialty Award Winners ===
Coach of The Year – P. J. Fleck, Western Michigan
Freshman of the Year – Javon Hagan, Ohio
Offensive Player of the Year – Corey Davis, Western Michigan
Defensive Player of the Year – Tarell Basham, Ohio
Special Teams Player of the Year – Darius Phillips, Western Michigan
Vern Smith Leadership Award Winner – Zach Terrell, Western Michigan

=== All-Conference teams ===
2016 All–MAC First Team Offense
Quarterback – Logan Woodside, Toledo
Offensive Linemen – Taylor Moton, Western Michigan
Offensive Lineman – Storm Norton, Toledo
Offensive Lineman – Chukwuma Okorafor, Western Michigan
Offensive Lineman – Max Scharping, Northern Illinois
Offensive Lineman – Mike Ebert, Toledo
Tight End – Michael Roberts, Toledo
Wide Receiver – Corey Davis, Western Michigan
Wide Receiver – Kenny Golladay, Northern Illinois
Wide Receiver – Cody Thompson, Toledo
Wide Receiver – Scotty Miller, Bowling Green
Running Back – Kareem Hunt, Toledo
Running Back – James Gilbert, Ball State
Placekicker – Louis Zervos, Ohio

2016 All–MAC First team Defense
Outside Linebacker – Blair Brown, Ohio
Outside Linebacker – Ulysees Gilbert, Akron
Inside Linebacker – Quentin Poling, Ohio
Inside Linebacker – Malik Fountain, Central Michigan
Down Lineman – Tarell Basham, Ohio
Down Lineman – Terence Waugh, Kent State
Down Lineman – John Stepec, Toledo
Down Lineman – Pat O'Connor, Eastern Michigan
Defensive Back – Darius Phillips, Western Michigan
Defensive Back – Amari Coleman, Central Michigan
Defensive Back – Heath Harding, Miami
Defensive Back – Najee Murray, Kent State
Punter – Joe Davidson, Bowling Green

2016 All–MAC First Team Specialists
Kickoff Return Specialist – Aregeros Turnerm, Northern Illinois
Punt Return Specialist – JoJo Natson, Akron

2016 All–MAC Second Team Offense
Quarterback – Zach Terrell, Western Michigan
Offensive Lineman – John Keenoy, Western Michigan
Offensive Lineman – Troy Watson, Ohio
Offensive Lineman – Levon Myers, Northern Illinois
Offensive Lineman – Collin Buchanan, Miami
Tight End – Mason Schreck, Buffalo
Wide Receiver – Corey Willis, Central Michigan
Wide Receiver – KeVonn Mabon, Ball State
Wide Receiver – Jon'Vea Johnson, Toledo
Wide Receiver – JoJo Natson, Akron
Running Back – Jarvion Franklin, Western Michigan
Running Back – Joel Bouagnon, Northern Illinois
Placekicker – Paul Fricano, Eastern Michigan

2016 All–MAC Second Team Defense
Outside Linebacker – Trenton Greene, Bowling Green
Outside Linebacker – Asantay Brown, Western Michigan
Inside Linebacker – Robert Spillane, Western Michigan
Inside Linebacker – Khalil Hodge, Buffalo
Down Lineback – Joe Ostman, Central Michigan
Down Lineback – JT Jones, Miami
Down Lineback – Treyvon Hester, Toledo
Down Lineback – Keion Adams, Western Michigan
Defensive Back – Shawun Lurry, Northern Illinois
Defensive Back – Dejuan Rogers, Toledo
Defensive Back – Javon Hagan, Ohio
Defensive Back – Jerrell Foster, Kent State
Punter – Austin Barnes, Eastern Michigan

2016 All–MAC Second Team Specialists
Kickoff Return Specialist – Darius Phillips, Western Michigan
Punt Return Specialist – Darius Phillips, Western Michigan

2016 All–MAC Third Team Offense
Quarterback – Cooper Rush, Central Michigan
Offensive Lineman – Andrew Wylie, Eastern Michigan
Offensive Lineman – Jake Pruehs, Ohio
Offensive Lineman – Tim McAuliffe, Bowling Green
Offensive Lineman – Logan Dietz, Bowling Green
Tight End – Donnie Ernsberger, Western Michigan
Wide Receiver – Jerome Lane, Akron
Wide Receiver – Sebastian Smith, Ohio
Wide Receiver – Sergion Bradley, Eastern Michigan
Wide Receiver – James Gardner, Miami
Running Back – Jordan Johnson, Buffalo
Running Back – Fred Coppet, Bowling Green
Placekicker – Tom O'Leary, Akron

2016 All–MAC Third Team Defense
Outside Linebacker – Sean Wiggins, Ball State
Outside Linebacker – De'Andre Montgomery, Miami
Inside Linebacker – Ju'Wuan Woodley Toledo
Inside Linebacker – Junior McMullen, Miami
Down Lineman – Jeremiah Harris, Eastern Michigan
Down Lineman – Jon Cunningham, Kent State
Down Lineman – Casey Sayles, Ohio
Down Lineman – Anthony Winbush, Ball State
Defensive Back – Justin Ferguson, Western Michigan
Defensive Back – Josh Cox, Central Michigan
Defensive Back – Daquan Pace, Eastern Michigan
Defensive Back – Jamari Bozeman, Bowling Green
Punter – Michael Farkas, Ohio

2016 All–MAC Third Team Specialists
Kickoff Return Specialist – Maurice Thomas, Miami
Punt Return Specialist – Corey Jones, Toledo

== Bowl Games ==
Six MAC schools participated in bowl games.

NOTE: All times are local

Bowl	Date	Time	MAC team (Record)	Opponent (Record)	Site	TV	Result	Attendance
2016 Camellia Bowl	Dec. 17		Toledo (9–3)	Appalachian St. (9–3)	Cramton Bowl • Montgomery, AL	ESPN		
2016 Miami Beach Bowl	Dec. 19		Central Michigan (6–6)	Tulsa (9–3)	Marlins Park • Miami, FL	ESPN		
2016 Dollar General Bowl	Dec. 23		Ohio (8–5)	Troy (9–3)	Marlins Park • Miami, FL	ESPN		
2016 Bahamas Bowl	Dec. 23		Eastern Michigan (7–5)	Old Dominion (9–3)	Thomas Robinson Stadium • Nassau, Bahamas	ESPN		
2016 St. Petersburg Bowl	Dec. 26		Miami (6–6)	Mississippi State (5–7)	Tropicana Field • St. Petersburg, FL	ESPN		
2017 Cotton Bowl Classic	Jan. 2		Western Michigan (13–0)	Wisconsin (10–3)	AT&T Stadium • Arlington, TX	ESPN		

== Home game attendance ==
Team	Stadium	Capacity	Game 1	Game 2	Game 3	Game 4	Game 5	Game 6	Total	Average	% of Capacity
Akron	InfoCision Stadium–Summa Field	30,000	11,061	15,381†	11,094	11,321	6,559	6,605	62,021	10,336	34.46%
Ball State	Scheumann Stadium	22,500	10,902†	7,249	10,739	5,614	4,442	—	38,946	7,789	34.62%
Bowling Green	Doyt Perry Stadium	24,000	15,318	16,384	19,382†	16,121	13,612	10,021	90,838	15,139	63.08%
Buffalo	UB Stadium	33,500	18,657	19,217	20,532†	16,092	15,012	15,447	104,957	17,492	52.22%
Central Michigan	Kelly/Shorts Stadium	30,255	16,215	19,922	**30,411**†	20,044	9,236	8,619	104,447	17,407	57.54%
Eastern Michigan	Rynearson Stadium	30,200	14,221	17,012	21,412†	16,481	15,603	19,147	103,876	17,312	57.33%
Kent State	Dix Stadium	25,319	13,540	14,265	20,167†	8,429	4,536	4,450	65,387	10,897	43.04%
Miami (OH)	Yager Stadium	24,286	17,369	19,822	22,212†	15,160	14,270	13,824	102,657	17,109	70.45%
Northern Illinois	Huskie Stadium	24,000	14,513	15,496†	8,495	11,801	4,790	—	55,095	11,019	45.9%
Ohio	Peden Stadium	24,000	23,093	22,265	23,077	23,566†	17,113	18,025	127,139	21,189	88.29%
Toledo	Glass Bowl	26,248	23,439	19,379	**30,147**†	17,821	16,154	16,826	123,766	20,627	78.59%
Western Michigan	Waldo Stadium	30,200	23,727	17,208	28,042†	23,721	26,136	24,191	143,025	23,838	78.93%

Bold – Exceed capacity
†Season High
