= 2016 Ohio Bobcats football team =

American college football team

2016 Ohio Bobcats football

MAC East Division co-champion

MAC Championship, L 23–29 vs. Western Michigan

Dollar General Bowl, L 23–28 vs. Troy
- Conference: Mid-American Conference
- East Division
- Record: 8–6 (6–2 MAC)
- Head coach: Frank Solich (12th season)
- Offensive coordinator: Tim Albin (12th season)
- Offensive scheme: Spread option
- Defensive coordinator: Jim Burrow (12th season)
- Base defense: 4-3
- Captains: Casey Sayles; A.J. Ouellette; Quentin Poling; Jordan Reid
- Home stadium: Peden Stadium

2016 Mid-American Conference football standings
	Conf.			Overall
Team	W		L	W		L
East Division
Ohio xy	6	–	2	8	–	6
Miami (OH) x	6	–	2	6	–	7
Akron	3	–	5	5	–	7
Bowling Green	3	–	5	4	–	8
Kent State	2	–	6	3	–	9
Buffalo	1	–	7	2	–	10
West Division
No. 15 Western Michigan xy$	8	–	0	13	–	1
Toledo	6	–	2	9	–	4
Northern Illinois	5	–	3	5	–	7
Eastern Michigan	4	–	4	7	–	6
Central Michigan	3	–	5	6	–	7
Ball State	1	–	7	4	–	8
Championship: Western Michigan 29, Ohio 23
$ – Conference champion; x – Division champion/co-champions; y – Championship game participant; Rankings from AP Poll

The 2016 Ohio Bobcats football team represented Ohio University in the 2016 NCAA Division I FBS football season. They were led by 12th-year head coach Frank Solich and played their home games at Peden Stadium. They were members of the East Division of the Mid-American Conference. They finished the season 8–6, 6–2 in MAC play to finish in a two-way tie for the East Division title. They represented the East Division in the MAC Championship Game where they lost to Western Michigan. They were invited to the Dollar General Bowl where they lost to Troy.

== Schedule ==
Date	Time	Opponent	Site	TV	Result	Attendance
September 3	3:30 p.m.	Texas State*	Peden Stadium; Athens, OH	CBSSN	L 54–56 ^{3OT}	23,093
September 10	2:30 p.m.	at Kansas*	Memorial Stadium; Lawrence, KS	FSN	W 37–21	28,467
September 17	12:00 p.m.	at No. 15 Tennessee*	Neyland Stadium; Knoxville, TN	SECN	L 19–28	101,362
September 24	2:00 p.m.	Gardner–Webb*	Peden Stadium; Athens, OH	ESPN3	W 37–21	22,265
October 1	2:30 p.m.	at Miami (OH)	Yager Stadium; Oxford, OH (Battle of the Bricks)	BCSN2	W 17–7	22,212
October 8	2:00 p.m.	Bowling Green^{†}	Peden Stadium; Athens, OH	ESPN3	W 30–24	23,077
October 15	2:00 p.m.	Eastern Michigan	Peden Stadium; Athens, OH	ESPN3	L 20–27	23,566
October 22	1:00 p.m.	at Kent State	Dix Stadium; Kent, OH	ESPN3	W 14–10	8,429
October 27	7:30 p.m.	at Toledo	Glass Bowl; Toledo, OH	CBSSN	W 31–26	16,154
November 3	6:00 p.m.	Buffalo	Peden Stadium; Athens, OH	CBSSN	W 34–10	17,113
November 15	6:00 p.m.	at Central Michigan	Kelly/Shorts Stadium; Mount Pleasant, MI	ESPN2	L 20–27	8,619
November 22	7:00 p.m.	Akron	Peden Stadium; Athens, OH	ESPNU	W 9–3	18,025
December 2	7:00 p.m.	vs. No. 13 Western Michigan	Ford Field; Detroit, MI (MAC Championship Game)	ESPN2	L 23–29	45,615
December 23	8:00 p.m.	vs. Troy*	Ladd–Peebles Stadium; Mobile, AL (Dollar General Bowl)	ESPN	L 23–28	32,377
*Non-conference game; ^{†}Homecoming; Rankings from AP Poll released prior to game; All times are in Eastern time

Schedule source:

== Game summaries ==
=== Texas State ===
	1	2	3	4	OT	2OT	3OT	Total
TSU Bobcats	0	14	7	17	3	7	8	56
OU Bobcats	6	0	10	22	3	7	6	54

=== At Kansas ===
	1	2	3	4	Total
Bobcats	15	13	6	3	37
Jayhawks	0	7	14	0	21

=== At Tennessee ===
	1	2	3	4	Total
Bobcats	6	6	7	0	19
#15 Volunteers	7	7	7	7	28

=== Gardner–Webb ===
	1	2	3	4	Total
Runnin' Bulldogs	7	0	7	7	21
Bobcats	14	16	7	0	37

=== At Miami (OH) ===
	1	2	3	4	Total
Bobcats	3	7	0	7	17
RedHawks	0	0	7	0	7

=== Bowling Green ===
	1	2	3	4	Total
Falcons	0	7	10	7	24
Bobcats	3	20	7	0	30

=== Eastern Michigan ===
	1	2	3	4	Total
Eagles	3	0	10	14	27
Bobcats	0	3	7	10	20

=== At Kent State ===
	1	2	3	4	Total
Bobcats	7	7	0	0	14
Golden Flashes	0	3	7	0	10

=== At Toledo ===
	1	2	3	4	Total
Bobcats	0	14	10	7	31
Rockets	0	6	14	6	26

=== Buffalo ===
	1	2	3	4	Total
Bulls	0	10	0	0	10
Bobcats	10	17	0	7	34

=== At Central Michigan ===
	1	2	3	4	Total
Bobcats	0	3	10	7	20
Chippewas	3	14	3	7	27

=== Akron ===
	1	2	3	4	Total
Zips	0	0	3	0	3
Bobcats	0	6	0	3	9

=== Vs. Western Michigan–MAC Championship Game ===
	1	2	3	4	Total
Bobcats	0	7	13	3	23
#13 Broncos	6	17	3	3	29

=== Vs. Troy–Dollar General Bowl ===
	1	2	3	4	Total
Bobcats	7	10	3	3	23
Trojans	14	7	7	0	28
