= 2016 Toledo Rockets football team =

American college football season

2016 Toledo Rockets football

Camellia Bowl, L 28–31 vs. Appalachian State
- Conference: Mid-American Conference
- West Division
- Record: 9–4 (6–2 MAC)
- Head coach: Jason Candle (1st season)
- Offensive coordinator: Brian Wright (1st season)
- Offensive scheme: Spread
- Defensive coordinator: Brian George (1st season)
- Base defense: 4–3
- Home stadium: Glass Bowl

2016 Mid-American Conference football standings
	Conf.			Overall
Team	W		L	W		L
East Division
Ohio xy	6	–	2	8	–	6
Miami (OH) x	6	–	2	6	–	7
Akron	3	–	5	5	–	7
Bowling Green	3	–	5	4	–	8
Kent State	2	–	6	3	–	9
Buffalo	1	–	7	2	–	10
West Division
No. 15 Western Michigan xy$	8	–	0	13	–	1
Toledo	6	–	2	9	–	4
Northern Illinois	5	–	3	5	–	7
Eastern Michigan	4	–	4	7	–	6
Central Michigan	3	–	5	6	–	7
Ball State	1	–	7	4	–	8
Championship: Western Michigan 29, Ohio 23
$ – Conference champion; x – Division champion/co-champions; y – Championship game participant; Rankings from AP Poll

The 2016 Toledo Rockets football team represented the University of Toledo in the 2016 NCAA Division I FBS football season. They were led by head coach Jason Candle in his first full overall year, after coaching the 2015 Boca Raton Bowl. They played their home games at the Glass Bowl and were members of the West Division of the Mid-American Conference. They finished the season 9–4, 6–2 in MAC play to finish in second place in the West Division. They were invited to the Camellia Bowl where they lost to Appalachian State.

== Schedule ==
Date	Time	Opponent	Site	TV	Result	Attendance
September 2	9:00 p.m.	at Arkansas State*	Centennial Bank Stadium; Jonesboro, AR	ESPNU	W 31–10	26,182
September 10	7:00 p.m.	Maine*	Glass Bowl; Toledo, OH	ESPN3	W 45–3	23,439
September 17	3:00 p.m.	Fresno State*	Glass Bowl; Toledo, OH	ESPN3/WTOL	W 52–17	19,379
September 30	10:15 p.m.	at BYU*	LaVell Edwards Stadium; Provo, UT	ESPN2	L 53–55	62,230
October 8	3:00 p.m.	at Eastern Michigan	Rynearson Stadium; Ypsilanti, MI	BCSN	W 35–20	21,412
October 15	3:30 p.m.	Bowling Green^{†}	Glass Bowl; Toledo, OH (Battle of I-75 Trophy)	ASN	W 42–35	30,147
October 22	12:00 p.m.	Central Michigan	Glass Bowl; Toledo, OH	BCSN	W 31–17	17,821
October 27	7:30 p.m.	Ohio	Glass Bowl; Toledo, OH	CBSSN	L 26–31	16,154
November 2	7:30 p.m.	at Akron	InfoCision Stadium; Akron, OH	ESPN2	W 48–17	6,559
November 9	8:00 p.m.	vs. Northern Illinois	Guaranteed Rate Field; Chicago, IL (Huskie Chi–Town Showdown)	ESPN2	W 31–24	10,180
November 16	7:00 p.m.	Ball State	Glass Bowl; Toledo, OH	ESPN2	W 37–19	16,826
November 25	5:00 p.m.	at No. 14 Western Michigan	Waldo Stadium; Kalamazoo, MI	ESPN2	L 35–55	24,191
December 17	5:30 p.m.	vs. Appalachian State*	Cramton Bowl; Montgomery, AL (Camellia Bowl)	ESPN	L 28–31	20,257
*Non-conference game; ^{†}Homecoming; Rankings from AP Poll released prior to game; All times are in Eastern time

Schedule Source

== Game summaries ==
=== At Arkansas State ===
	1	2	3	4	Total
Rockets	0	21	10	0	31
Red Wolves	3	0	0	7	10

=== Maine ===
	1	2	3	4	Total
Black Bears	3	0	0	0	3
Rockets	7	10	21	7	45

=== Fresno State ===
	1	2	3	4	Total
Bulldogs	0	0	7	10	17
Rockets	14	10	14	14	52

=== At BYU ===
	1	2	3	4	Total
Rockets	14	7	17	15	53
Cougars	21	0	14	20	55

=== At Eastern Michigan ===
	1	2	3	4	Total
Rockets	0	7	14	14	35
Eagles	0	3	10	7	20

=== Bowling Green ===
	1	2	3	4	Total
Falcons	7	0	7	21	35
Rockets	7	7	13	15	42

=== Central Michigan ===
	1	2	3	4	Total
Chippewas	0	0	10	7	17
Rockets	3	0	14	14	31

=== Ohio ===
	1	2	3	4	Total
Bobcats	0	14	10	7	31
Rockets	0	6	14	6	26

=== At Akron ===
	1	2	3	4	Total
Rockets	3	17	14	14	48
Zips	10	0	7	0	17

=== vs Northern Illinois ===
	1	2	3	4	Total
Rockets	0	3	14	14	31
Huskies	7	7	7	3	24

=== Ball State ===
	1	2	3	4	Total
Cardinals	0	10	3	6	19
Rockets	14	6	17	0	37

=== At Western Michigan ===
	1	2	3	4	Total
Rockets	7	7	0	21	35
#14 Broncos	14	10	21	10	55

=== Appalachian State–Camellia Bowl ===
	1	2	3	4	Total
Mountaineers	7	7	14	3	31
Rockets	7	7	14	0	28

== After the season ==
=== NFL draft ===
The following Rockets were selected in the 2017 NFL draft following the season.

Round	Pick	Player	Position	NFL club
3	86	Kareem Hunt	Running back	Kansas City Chiefs
4	127	Michael Roberts	Tight end	Detroit Lions
7	244	Treyvon Hester	Defensive tackle	Oakland Raiders
