= 2016 Buffalo Bulls football team =

American college football season

2016 Buffalo Bulls football
- Conference: Mid-American Conference
- East Division
- Record: 2–10 (1–7 MAC)
- Head coach: Lance Leipold (2nd season)
- Offensive coordinator: Andy Kotelnicki (2nd season)
- Offensive scheme: Multiple pro-style
- Defensive coordinator: Brian Borland (2nd season)
- Base defense: 4–3
- Home stadium: University at Buffalo Stadium

2016 Mid-American Conference football standings
	Conf.			Overall
Team	W		L	W		L
East Division
Ohio xy	6	–	2	8	–	6
Miami (OH) x	6	–	2	6	–	7
Akron	3	–	5	5	–	7
Bowling Green	3	–	5	4	–	8
Kent State	2	–	6	3	–	9
Buffalo	1	–	7	2	–	10
West Division
No. 15 Western Michigan xy$	8	–	0	13	–	1
Toledo	6	–	2	9	–	4
Northern Illinois	5	–	3	5	–	7
Eastern Michigan	4	–	4	7	–	6
Central Michigan	3	–	5	6	–	7
Ball State	1	–	7	4	–	8
Championship: Western Michigan 29, Ohio 23
$ – Conference champion; x – Division champion/co-champions; y – Championship game participant; Rankings from AP Poll

The 2016 Buffalo Bulls football team represented the University at Buffalo as a member of the Mid-American Conference (MAC) during the 2016 NCAA Division I FBS football season. Led by second-year head coach Lance Leipold, the Bulls compiled an overall record of 2–10 with a mark of 1–7 in conference play, placing last out six teams in the MAC's East Division. The team played home games at University at Buffalo Stadium in Amherst, New York.

== Schedule ==
Date	Time	Opponent	Site	TV	Result	Attendance
September 2	7:00 pm	Albany*	University at Buffalo Stadium; Amherst, NY	ESPN3	L 16–22	18,657
September 17	9:00 pm	at Nevada*	Mackay Stadium; Reno, NV	Campus Insiders, Twitter	L 14–38	20,457
September 24	7:00 pm	Army*	University at Buffalo Stadium; Amherst, NY	ESPN3	W 23–20 ^{OT}	19,217
October 1	1:00 pm	at Boston College*	Alumni Stadium; Chestnut Hill, MA	ACCN+	L 3–35	24,203
October 8	3:30 pm	Kent State^{†}	University at Buffalo Stadium; Amherst, NY	ESPN3	L 20–44	20,532
October 15	3:30 pm	Ball State	University at Buffalo Stadium; Amherst, NY	ESPN3	L 21–31	16,092
October 22	3:30 pm	at Northern Illinois	Huskie Stadium; DeKalb, IL	ESPN3	L 7–44	11,801
October 27	7:30 pm	Akron	University at Buffalo Stadium; Amherst, NY	BCSN, ESPN3	W 41–20	15,012
November 3	6:00 pm	at Ohio	Peden Stadium; Athens, OH	CBSSN	L 10–34	17,113
November 12	1:00 pm	Miami (OH)	University at Buffalo Stadium; Amherst, NY	ESPN3	L 24–35	15,447
November 19	3:30 pm	at No. 14 Western Michigan	Waldo Stadium; Kalamazoo, MI (College GameDay)	ESPNU	L 0–38	26,136
November 25	2:30 pm	at Bowling Green	Doyt Perry Stadium; Bowling Green, OH	ESPN3	L 19–27	10,021
*Non-conference game; ^{†}Homecoming; Rankings from AP Poll released prior to the game; All times are in Eastern time

== Game summaries ==
=== Albany ===
Week One: Albany Great Danes at Buffalo Bulls – Game summary

Quarter	1	2	3	4	Total
Great Danes	7	7	0	8	22
Bulls	0	13	3	0	16

at UB Stadium, Amherst, NY

- Date: September 2
- Game time: 7:00 p.m. EDT
- Game attendance: 18,657
- TV: ESPN3

Game information

First quarter
Second quarter
Third quarter
Fourth quarter

Leading Passers

- UA –
- UB –

Leading Rushers

- UA –
- UB –

Leading Receivers

- UA –
- UB –

Leading Tacklers

- UA –
- UB –

=== @ Nevada ===
Week Three: Buffalo Bulls at Nevada Wolf Pack – Game summary

Quarter	1	2	3	4	Total
Bulls	0	0	7	7	14
Wolf Pack	7	17	7	7	38

at Mackay Stadium, Reno, NV

- Date: September 17
- Game time: 9:00 p.m. EDT
- Game attendance: 20,457
- TV: MW Net/Twitter

Game information

First quarter
Second quarter
Third quarter
Fourth quarter

Leading Passers

- UB –
- UNR –

Leading Rushers

- UB –
- UNR –

Leading Receivers

- UB –
- UNR –

Leading Tacklers

- UB –
- UNR –

=== Army ===
Week Four: Army Black Knights at Buffalo Bulls – Game summary

Quarter	1	2	3	4	OT	Total
Black Knights	7	3	10	0	0	20
Bulls	0	0	6	14	3	23

at UB Stadium, Amherst, NY

- Date: September 24
- Game time: 7:00 p.m. EDT
- Game attendance: 19,217
- TV: ESPN3

Game information

First quarter
Second quarter
Third quarter
Fourth quarter

Leading Passers

- USMA –
- UB –

Leading Rushers

- USMA –
- UB –

Leading Receivers

- USMA –
- UB –

Leading Tacklers

- USMA –
- UB –

=== @ Boston College ===
Week Five: Buffalo Bulls at Boston College Eagles – Game summary

Quarter	1	2	3	4	Total
Bulls	0	3	0	0	3
Eagles	7	14	0	14	35

at Alumni Stadium, Chestnut Hill, MA

- Date: October 1
- Game time: 1:00 p.m. EDT
- Game attendance: 24,203
- TV: ACCN+

Game information

First quarter
Second quarter
Third quarter
Fourth quarter

Leading Passers

- UB –
- BC –

Leading Rushers

- UB –
- BC –

Leading Receivers

- UB –
- BC –

Leading Tacklers

- UB –
- BC –

=== Kent State ===
Week Six: Kent State Golden Flashes at Buffalo Bulls – Game summary

Quarter	1	2	3	4	Total
Golden Flashes	10	10	7	17	44
Bulls	0	3	3	14	20

at UB Stadium, Amherst, NY

- Date: October 8
- Game time: 3:30 p.m. EDT
- Game attendance: 20,532

Game information

First quarter
Second quarter
Third quarter
Fourth quarter

Leading Passers

- KSU –
- UB –

Leading Rushers

- KSU –
- UB –

Leading Receivers

- KSU –
- UB –

Leading Tacklers

- KSU –
- UB –

=== Ball State ===
Week Seven: Ball State Cardinals at Buffalo Bulls – Game summary

Quarter	1	2	3	4	Total
Cardinals	7	0	14	10	31
Bulls	7	7	0	7	21

at UB Stadium, Amherst, NY

- Date: October 15
- Game time: 3:30 p.m. EDT
- Game attendance: 16,092

Game information

First quarter
Second quarter
Third quarter
Fourth quarter

Leading Passers

- BSU –
- UB –

Leading Rushers

- BSU –
- UB –

Leading Receivers

- BSU –
- UB –

Leading Tacklers

- BSU –
- UB –

=== @ Northern Illinois ===
Week Eight: Buffalo Bulls at Northern Illinois Huskies – Game summary

Quarter	1	2	3	4	Total
Bulls	0	7	0	0	7
Huskies	10	20	7	7	44

at Huskie Stadium, DeKalb, IL

- Date: October 22
- Game time: 3:30 p.m. EDT
- Game attendance: 11,801

Game information

First quarter
Second quarter
Third quarter
Fourth quarter

Leading Passers

- UB –
- NIU –

Leading Rushers

- UB –
- NIU –

Leading Receivers

- UB –
- NIU –

Leading Tacklers

- UB –
- NIU –

=== Akron ===
Week Nine: Akron Zips at Buffalo Bulls – Game summary

Quarter	1	2	3	4	Total
Zips	3	7	3	7	20
Bulls	3	17	0	21	41

at UB Stadium, Amherst, NY

- Date: October 27
- Game time: 7:30 p.m. EDT
- TV: BCSN/ESPN3

Game information

First quarter
Second quarter
Third quarter
Fourth quarter

Leading Passers

- UA –
- UB –

Leading Rushers

- UA –
- UB –

Leading Receivers

- UA –
- UB –

Leading Tacklers

- UA –
- UB –

=== @ Ohio ===
Week Ten: Buffalo Bulls at Ohio Bobcats – Game summary

Quarter	1	2	3	4	Total
Bulls	0	10	0	0	10
Bobcats	10	17	0	7	34

at Peden Stadium, Athens, OH

- Date: November 3
- Game time: 6:00 p.m. EDT
- TV: CBSSN

Game information

First quarter
Second quarter
Third quarter
Fourth quarter

Leading Passers

- UB –
- OU –

Leading Rushers

- UB –
- OU –

Leading Receivers

- UB –
- OU –

Leading Tacklers

- UB –
- OU –

=== Miami (OH) ===
Week Eleven: Miami RedHawks at Buffalo Bulls – Game summary

Quarter	1	2	3	4	Total
RedHawks	13	7	12	3	35
Bulls	0	7	3	14	24

at UB Stadium, Amherst, NY

- Date: November 12
- Game time: 1:00 p.m. EST

Game information

First quarter
Second quarter
Third quarter
Fourth quarter

Leading Passers

- MU –
- UB –

Leading Rushers

- MU –
- UB –

Leading Receivers

- MU –
- UB –

Leading Tacklers

- MU –
- UB –

=== @ Western Michigan ===
Week Twelve: Buffalo Bulls at Western Michigan Broncos – Game summary

Quarter	1	2	3	4	Total
Bulls	0	0	0	0	0
#14 Broncos	0	14	10	14	38

at Waldo Stadium, Kalamazoo, MI

- Date: November 19
- Game time: 3:30 p.m. EST

Game information

First quarter
Second quarter
Third quarter
Fourth quarter

Leading Passers

- UB –
- WMU –

Leading Rushers

- UB –
- WMU –

Leading Receivers

- UB –
- WMU –

Leading Tacklers

- UB –
- WMU –

=== @ Bowling Green ===
Week Thirteen: Buffalo Bulls at Bowling Green Falcons – Game summary

Quarter	1	2	3	4	Total
Bulls	0	12	0	7	19
Falcons	7	7	6	7	27

at Doyt Perry Stadium, Bowling Green, OH

- Date: November 25
- Game time: 2:30 p.m. EST

Game information

First quarter
Second quarter
Third quarter
Fourth quarter

Leading Passers

- UB –
- BGSU –

Leading Rushers

- UB –
- BGSU –

Leading Receivers

- UB –
- BGSU –

Leading Tacklers

- UB –
- BGSU –

== Roster ==
2016 Buffalo Bulls football team roster
Players
Coaches
Offense

Pos.	#	Name	Class
RB	2	Jordan Johnson	Sr
QB	3	Tyree Jackson	Fr
WR	10	Jerin Scroggins	So
RB	11	Theo Anderson	Fr
QB	12	Drew Anderson	So
OL	52	Dan Carr	Fr
TE	85	Mason Schreck	Sr

Defense

Pos.	#	Name	Class
LB	4	Khalil Hodge	So
CB	9	Tatum Slack	So
CB	41	Boise Ross	Sr
LB	42	Matt Otwinowski	Fr
DB	43	Craig Hardgers	Jr
DE	94	Myles Nicholas	So
DT	95	Jake Khoury	So

Special teams

Pos.	#	Name	Class
P	95	Conor Clarke	Sr

Head coach

- Lance Leipold

Coordinators/assistant coaches

- Andy Kotelnicki – Offensive coordinator
- Brian Borland – Defensive coordinator/safeties

Legend

- (C) Team captain
- (S) Suspended
- (I) Ineligible
- Injured
- Redshirt

Roster

== After the season ==
=== NFL draft ===
The following Bull was selected in the 2017 NFL draft following the season.

Round	Pick	Player	Position	NFL club
7	251	Mason Schreck	Tight end	Cincinnati Bengals
