= 2016 Central Michigan Chippewas football team =

American college football season

2016 Central Michigan Chippewas football

Miami Beach Bowl, L 10–55 vs. Tulsa
- Conference: Mid-American Conference
- West Division
- Record: 6–7 (3–5 MAC)
- Head coach: John Bonamego (2nd season)
- Offensive coordinator: Morris Watts (3rd season)
- Defensive coordinator: Greg Colby (2nd season)
- Home stadium: Kelly/Shorts Stadium

2016 Mid-American Conference football standings
	Conf.			Overall
Team	W		L	W		L
East Division
Ohio xy	6	–	2	8	–	6
Miami (OH) x	6	–	2	6	–	7
Akron	3	–	5	5	–	7
Bowling Green	3	–	5	4	–	8
Kent State	2	–	6	3	–	9
Buffalo	1	–	7	2	–	10
West Division
No. 15 Western Michigan xy$	8	–	0	13	–	1
Toledo	6	–	2	9	–	4
Northern Illinois	5	–	3	5	–	7
Eastern Michigan	4	–	4	7	–	6
Central Michigan	3	–	5	6	–	7
Ball State	1	–	7	4	–	8
Championship: Western Michigan 29, Ohio 23
$ – Conference champion; x – Division champion/co-champions; y – Championship game participant; Rankings from AP Poll

The 2016 Central Michigan Chippewas football team represented Central Michigan University in the 2016 NCAA Division I FBS football season. They were led by second-year head coach John Bonamego and played their home games at Kelly/Shorts Stadium as members of the West Division of the Mid-American Conference. They finished the season 6–7, 3–5 to finish in fifth place in the MAC West. They received an invitation to the Miami Beach Bowl where they were blown out by Tulsa 55–10.

== Schedule ==
Date	Time	Opponent	Site	TV	Result	Attendance
September 1	7:00 pm	Presbyterian*	Kelly/Shorts Stadium; Mount Pleasant, MI	ESPN3	W 49–3	16,215
September 10	12:00 pm	at No. 22 Oklahoma State*	Boone Pickens Stadium; Stillwater, OK	FS1	W 30–27	52,523
September 17	3:00 pm	UNLV*	Kelly/Shorts Stadium; Mount Pleasant, MI	ESPN3	W 44–21	19,922
September 24	12:30 pm	at Virginia*	Scott Stadium; Charlottesville, VA	ACCRSN	L 35–49	35,211
October 1	7:00 pm	Western Michigan	Kelly/Shorts Stadium; Mount Pleasant, MI (rivalry)	CBSSN	L 10–49	30,411
October 8	3:00 pm	Ball State^{†}	Kelly/Shorts Stadium; Mount Pleasant, MI	ASN	W 24–21	20,044
October 15	3:30 pm	at Northern Illinois	Huskie Stadium; DeKalb, IL	ESPN3	W 34–28 ^{3OT}	8,495
October 22	12:00 pm	at Toledo	Glass Bowl; Toledo, OH	BCSN	L 17–31	17,821
October 29	12:00 pm	Kent State	Kelly/Shorts Stadium; Mount Pleasant, MI	CBSSN	L 24–27	9,236
November 4	6:00 pm	at Miami (OH)	Yager Stadium; Oxford, OH	CBSSN	L 17–37	14,270
November 15	6:00 pm	Ohio	Kelly/Shorts Stadium; Mount Pleasant, MI	ESPN2	W 27–20	8,619
November 22	7:00 pm	at Eastern Michigan	Rynearson Stadium; Ypsilanti, MI (rivalry)	ESPN3	L 21–26	19,147
December 19	2:30 pm	vs. Tulsa*	Marlins Park; Miami, FL (Miami Beach Bowl)	ESPN	L 10–55	15,262
*Non-conference game; ^{†}Homecoming; Rankings from AP Poll released prior to the game; All times are in Eastern time

Schedule source:

== Game summaries ==
=== Presbyterian ===
	1	2	3	4	Total
Blue Hose	0	3	0	0	3
Chippewas	7	7	14	21	49

=== At Oklahoma State ===
	1	2	3	4	Total
Chippewas	0	10	7	13	30
#22 Cowboys	14	3	3	7	27

This game sparked controversy after the officials missed a call that would eventually give Central Michigan the win. Oklahoma State threw the ball away to end the game and received a penalty for intentional grounding. Under college football rules, the game would have ended and Oklahoma State would have won the game. However, the officials gave Central Michigan an untimed down, and the Chippewas threw a 51-yard hail mary and scored after completing the pass and a lateral.

=== UNLV ===
	1	2	3	4	Total
Rebels	7	14	0	0	21
Chippewas	14	14	9	7	44

=== At Virginia ===
	1	2	3	4	Total
Chippewas	0	14	7	14	35
Cavaliers	15	13	0	21	49

=== Western Michigan ===
	1	2	3	4	Total
Broncos	7	14	14	14	49
Chippewas	3	0	7	0	10

=== Ball State ===
	1	2	3	4	Total
Cardinals	7	0	7	7	21
Chippewas	3	14	0	7	24

=== At Northern Illinois ===
	1	2	3	4	OT	2OT	3OT	Total
Chippewas	0	14	0	7	0	7	6	34
Huskies	0	7	7	7	0	7	0	28

=== At Toledo ===
	1	2	3	4	Total
Chippewas	0	0	10	7	17
Rockets	3	0	14	14	31

=== Kent State ===
	1	2	3	4	Total
Golden Flashes	3	7	7	10	27
Chippewas	0	10	14	0	24

=== At Miami (OH) ===
	1	2	3	4	Total
Chippewas	7	10	0	0	17
RedHawks	13	7	10	7	37

=== Ohio ===
	1	2	3	4	Total
Bobcats	0	3	10	7	20
Chippewas	3	14	3	7	27

=== At Eastern Michigan ===
	1	2	3	4	Total
Chippewas	0	7	0	14	21
Eagles	7	7	6	6	26

=== Tulsa–Miami Beach Bowl ===
	1	2	3	4	Total
Chippewas	3	0	0	7	10
Golden Hurricane	10	21	17	7	55

== Roster ==
2016 Central Michigan Chippewas football team roster
Players
Coaches
Offense

Pos.	#	Name	Class
QB	1	Tony Poljan	Fr
QB	2	Jake Johnson	RFr
WR	3	Mark Chapman	Jr
WR	4	Jamil Sabbagh	RFr
RB	5	Jonathan Ward	Fr
WR	6	Bailey Edwards	Fr
QB	7	Tommy Lazzaro	So
WR	8	Corey Willis	Jr
WR	9	Damon Terry	RFr
QB	10	Cooper Rush	Sr
RB	11	Jahray Hayes	Sr
WR	12	Eric Cooper	Jr
QB	16	Austin Hergott	Fr
RB	16	Matt Krause	RFr
WR	17	Austin Stewart	Sr
WR	18	Brandon Childress	RFr
RB	19	Jay Roberson	Jr
WR	23	Anthony Scarcelli	Sr
RB	24	Chris Nelson	Fr
RB	25	Devon Spalding	Jr
RB	26	Trent Grimes	So
RB	28	Jerrod Davis	RFr
RB	31	Berkley Edwards	Jr
RB	33	Kumehnnu Gwilly	Fr
RB	34	Romello Ross	So
RB	35	Trevor Thomas	Jr
RB	40	Joe Bacci	Sr
FB	44	Hunter Buczkowski	Fr
TE	47	Clay Walderzak	So
FB	48	Oakley Lavallii	Fr
OL	56	Derek Smith	Fr
OL	58	Joe Komel	So
OL	59	Joe Austin	Jr
OL	60	Steve Eipper	RFr
OL	66	Logan Slaughter	RFr
OL	67	J.P. Quinn	Jr
OL	70	Shakir Carr	So
OL	71	Kevin D'Arcy	Sr
OL	72	Matt Doan	RFr
OL	73	Brandon Keen	So
OL	74	Derek Edwards	Jr
OL	75	Kenny Rogers	Sr
OL	76	Jack Ford	Jr
OL	77	Andy Adado	So
OL	78	Louis Grigoletti	RFr
OL	79	Austin Doan	Jr
WR	80	Anthony Rice	Sr
TE	81	Austin Ervin	RFr
WR	82	Cameron Cole	RFr
TE	83	Tyler Conklin	Jr
WR	84	Brandon Arduino	Sr
TE	85	Jonathan Carson	So
TE	86	Zach Crouch	Jr
WR	88	Jesse Kroll	Sr
TE	89	Logan Hessbrook	RFr

Defense

Pos.	#	Name	Class
DB	1	Alonzo McCoy	Fr
DB	2	Jakkar Jackson	Fr
DB	3	Emmett Thomas	So
DB	4	Winslow Chapman	Sr
DB	6	Da'Quaun Jamison	RFr
DB	7	Amari Coleman	Jr
LB	8	Malik Fountain	So
DB	10	Zach Oakley	So
LB	11	Trevor Apsey	So
DB	12	Marcel Ray	Fr
DB	14	Josh Cox	Jr
DB	15	Tee'ondre Harvey	Fr
DB	17	Marcus Samuels	So
DB	18	Tony Annese	Sr
LB	19	Bobby Banks	RFr
DB	20	Gage Kreski	Fr
DB	22	Gary Jones	Jr
DB	27	Sean Bunting	Fr
DB	29	Andy Branch	Fr
LB	30	Alex Briones	So
LB	32	Jeff Perry	Jr
LB	33	Tyree Waller	Jr
DB	34	Colton Odykirk	Sr
DB	36	Tyjuan Swain	Jr
DB	37	Otis Kearney	So
DB	38	Ray Golden	Jr
LB	39	Michael Oliver	RFr
DB	41	Elijah Olsen	So
LB	42	Nathan Ricketts	Sr
LB	43	Carlos Clark	RFr
DL	44	Mitch Stanitzek	Jr
DL	45	Joe Ostman	Jr
DL	46	Nate Brisson-Fast	So
LB	51	Chase McGill	So
DL	52	Jabari Dean	Sr
DL	53	Leon Page	Fr
DL	54	Blake Brady	Fr
DL	55	Michael Steinhauer	Jr
DL	57	Mike Danna	RFr
DL	90	Chris Kantzavelos	Jr
DL	91	Deshawn Baker-Williams	RFr
DL	92	Dante Cleveland	Fr
DL	93	Donny Kyre	Jr
DL	94	Alex Neering	So
DL	95	D'Andre Dill	Fr
DL	97	Shahid Bellamy	RFr
DL	98	Kelby Latta	Sr
DL	99	Josh Eldridge	Fr

Special teams

Pos.	#	Name	Class
P	9	Cooper Mojsiejenko	So
K	13	Kaden Keon	Fr
LS	49	Luke Idoni	So
LS	61	Keegan Markgraf	Fr
LS	64	Travis Malinowski	Fr
K	96	Brian Eavey	Sr
P	99	Jack Sheldon	So

Head coach

- John Bonamego

Coordinators/assistant coaches

- Mose Rison – Assistant Head Coach/Wide Receivers
- Greg Colby – Defensive Coordinator/Linebackers
- Morris Watts – Offensive Coordinator/Quarterbacks
- Mike Dietzel – Special Teams Coordinator/Safeties
- Archie Collins – Defensive Backs
- Derek Frazier – Offensive Line
- Gino Guidugli – Running Backs/Recruiting Coordinator
- Sherrone Moore – Tight Ends
- George Ricumstrict – Defensive Line
- Jason Novak – Strength and Conditioning
- Reed Schuitema – Director of Football Operations
- Jay McDowell – Football Video Operations Coordinator
- Ben Presnell – Director of Player Personnel
- Paul Verska – Director of High School Relations/Special Assistant to the Head Coach
- Jesse Johnson – On-Campus Recruiting Coordinator
- Sam Elliott – Operations Assistant
- Kenny McClendon – Graduate Assistant
- Josh Sinagoga – Graduate Assistant
- Todd Storm – Graduate Assistant
- Jameson Zacharias – Graduate Assistant
- Ryan Kolakowski – Quality Control
- Andy Phillips – Quality Control
- Justin Sweeney – Quality Control
- Saylor Lavallii – Student Assistant
- Jason Johnson – Recruiting Student Assistant
- Alex Knollman – Recruiting Student Assistant

Legend

- (C) Team captain
- (S) Suspended
- (I) Ineligible
- Injured
- Redshirt

Roster
