= 2016 Eastern Michigan Eagles football team =

American college football season

2016 Eastern Michigan Eagles football

Bahamas Bowl, L 20–24 vs. Old Dominion
- Conference: Mid-American Conference
- West Division
- Record: 7–6 (4–4 MAC)
- Head coach: Chris Creighton (3rd season)
- Offensive coordinator: Kalen DeBoer (3rd season)
- Offensive scheme: Spread
- Defensive coordinator: Neal Neathery (1st season)
- Base defense: 4–2–5
- Home stadium: Rynearson Stadium

2016 Mid-American Conference football standings
	Conf.			Overall
Team	W		L	W		L
East Division
Ohio xy	6	–	2	8	–	6
Miami (OH) x	6	–	2	6	–	7
Akron	3	–	5	5	–	7
Bowling Green	3	–	5	4	–	8
Kent State	2	–	6	3	–	9
Buffalo	1	–	7	2	–	10
West Division
No. 15 Western Michigan xy$	8	–	0	13	–	1
Toledo	6	–	2	9	–	4
Northern Illinois	5	–	3	5	–	7
Eastern Michigan	4	–	4	7	–	6
Central Michigan	3	–	5	6	–	7
Ball State	1	–	7	4	–	8
Championship: Western Michigan 29, Ohio 23
$ – Conference champion; x – Division champion/co-champions; y – Championship game participant; Rankings from AP Poll

The 2016 Eastern Michigan Eagles football team represented Eastern Michigan University in the 2016 NCAA Division I FBS football season. They were led by third-year head coach Chris Creighton. The Eagles played their home games at Rynearson Stadium and are members of the West Division of the Mid-American Conference. Coming off of a 1–11 season in 2015, the Eagles performed a remarkable turnaround and finished 7–6, 4–4 in MAC play to finish in fourth place in the West Division. They were invited to the 2016 Bahamas Bowl, just their second bowl game in school history. They also improved their home attendance by over 260% compared to 2015.

The Eagles compiled their first winning season since 1995, and their first bowl game since 1987, snapping the second longest bowl drought in the nation.

== Schedule ==
Date	Time	Opponent	Site	TV	Result	Attendance
September 2	6:00 pm	Mississippi Valley State*	Rynearson Stadium; Ypsilanti, MI	ESPN3	W 61–14	14,221
September 10	7:30 pm	at Missouri*	Faurot Field; Columbia, MO	SECN	L 21–61	51,192
September 17	6:00 pm	at Charlotte*	Jerry Richardson Stadium; Charlotte, NC	CUSA.tv	W 37–19	15,080
September 24	7:30 pm	Wyoming*	Rynearson Stadium; Ypsilanti, MI	CBSSN	W 27–24	17,012
October 1	3:00 pm	at Bowling Green	Doyt Perry Stadium; Bowling Green, OH	ESPN3	W 28–25	19,382
October 8	3:00 pm	Toledo^{†}	Rynearson Stadium; Ypsilanti, MI	BCSN	L 20–35	21,412
October 15	2:00 pm	at Ohio	Peden Stadium; Athens, OH	ESPN3	W 27–20	23,566
October 22	3:30 pm	at No. 20 Western Michigan	Waldo Stadium; Kalamazoo, MI (Michigan MAC Trophy)	ASN/ESPN3	L 31–45	23,721
October 29	3:30 pm	Miami (OH)	Rynearson Stadium; Ypsilanti, MI	ASN/ESPN3	L 15–28	16,481
November 8	7:30 pm	at Ball State	Scheumann Stadium; Muncie, IN	CBSSN	W 48–41	4,442
November 16	8:00 pm	Northern Illinois	Rynearson Stadium; Ypsilanti, MI	ESPNU	L 24–31 ^{OT}	15,603
November 22	7:00 pm	Central Michigan	Rynearson Stadium; Ypsilanti, MI (Michigan MAC Trophy/rivalry)	ESPN3	W 26–21	19,147
December 23	1:00 pm	vs. Old Dominion*	Thomas Robinson Stadium; Nassau, Bahamas (Bahamas Bowl)	ESPN	L 20–24	13,422
*Non-conference game; ^{†}Homecoming; Rankings from AP Poll released prior to the game; All times are in Eastern time

== Game summaries ==
=== Mississippi Valley State ===
	1	2	3	4	Total
Delta Devils	0	0	0	14	14
Eagles	21	7	26	7	61

=== At Missouri ===
	1	2	3	4	Total
Eagles	0	7	14	0	21
Tigers	14	19	14	14	61

=== At Charlotte ===
	1	2	3	4	Total
Eagles	7	10	17	3	37
49ers	0	3	3	13	19

=== Wyoming ===
	1	2	3	4	Total
Cowboys	10	7	0	7	24
Eagles	3	14	3	7	27

=== At Bowling Green ===
	1	2	3	4	Total
Eagles	7	0	14	7	28
Falcons	7	3	0	15	25

=== Toledo ===
	1	2	3	4	Total
Rockets	0	7	14	14	35
Eagles	0	3	10	7	20

=== At Ohio ===
	1	2	3	4	Total
Eagles	3	0	10	14	27
Bobcats	0	3	7	10	20

=== At Western Michigan ===
	1	2	3	4	Total
Eagles	7	10	7	7	31
#20 Broncos	7	17	14	7	45

=== Miami (OH) ===
	1	2	3	4	Total
RedHawks	14	0	7	7	28
Eagles	0	3	0	12	15

=== At Ball State ===
	1	2	3	4	Total
Eagles	3	16	14	15	48
Cardinals	21	7	0	13	41

=== Northern Illinois ===
	1	2	3	4	OT	Total
Huskies	0	0	17	7	7	31
Eagles	14	7	0	3	0	24

=== Central Michigan ===
	1	2	3	4	Total
Chippewas	0	7	0	14	21
Eagles	7	7	6	6	26

=== Vs. Old Dominion–Bahamas Bowl ===
	1	2	3	4	Total
Eagles	0	0	17	3	20
Monarchs	3	7	7	7	24

== After the season ==
The following Eagle was selected in the 2017 NFL draft after the season.

Round	Pick	Player	Position	NFL club
7	250	Pat O'Connor	Defensive end	Detroit Lions
