= 2016 Bowling Green Falcons football team =

American college football season

2016 Bowling Green Falcons football
- Conference: Mid-American Conference
- East Division
- Record: 4–8 (3–5 MAC)
- Head coach: Mike Jinks (1st season)
- Co-offensive coordinators: Kevin Kilmer (1st season); Andy Padron (1 season)
- Offensive scheme: Spread
- Co-defensive coordinators: Perry Eliano (1st season); Marcus White (1st season)
- Base defense: 4–3
- Home stadium: Doyt Perry Stadium

2016 Mid-American Conference football standings
	Conf.			Overall
Team	W		L	W		L
East Division
Ohio xy	6	–	2	8	–	6
Miami (OH) x	6	–	2	6	–	7
Akron	3	–	5	5	–	7
Bowling Green	3	–	5	4	–	8
Kent State	2	–	6	3	–	9
Buffalo	1	–	7	2	–	10
West Division
No. 15 Western Michigan xy$	8	–	0	13	–	1
Toledo	6	–	2	9	–	4
Northern Illinois	5	–	3	5	–	7
Eastern Michigan	4	–	4	7	–	6
Central Michigan	3	–	5	6	–	7
Ball State	1	–	7	4	–	8
Championship: Western Michigan 29, Ohio 23
$ – Conference champion; x – Division champion/co-champions; y – Championship game participant; Rankings from AP Poll

The 2016 Bowling Green Falcons football team represented Bowling Green State University in the 2016 NCAA Division I FBS football season. The Falcons played their home games at Doyt Perry Stadium. They were led by first-year head coach Mike Jinks, and were members of the East Division of the Mid-American Conference. They finished the season 4–8, 3–5 in MAC play to finish in a tie for third place in the East Division.

== Schedule ==
Date	Time	Opponent	Site	TV	Result	Attendance
September 3	12:00 pm	at No. 6 Ohio State*	Ohio Stadium; Columbus, OH	BTN	L 10–77	107,193
September 10	3:30 pm	No. 25 (FCS) North Dakota*	Doyt Perry Stadium; Bowling Green, OH	ASN	W 27–26	15,318
September 17	12:00 pm	Middle Tennessee*	Doyt Perry Stadium; Bowling Green, OH	ASN	L 21–41	16,384
September 24	8:00 pm	at Memphis*	Liberty Bowl Memorial Stadium; Memphis, TN	ESPNews	L 3–77	38,713
October 1	3:00 pm	Eastern Michigan^{†}	Doyt Perry Stadium; Bowling Green, OH	ESPN3	L 25–28	19,382
October 8	2:00 pm	at Ohio	Peden Stadium; Athens, OH	ESPN3	L 24–30	23,077
October 15	3:30 pm	at Toledo	Glass Bowl; Toledo, OH (Battle of I-75 Trophy)	ASN	L 35–42	30,147
October 22	12:00 pm	Miami (OH)	Doyt Perry Stadium; Bowling Green, OH	ESPN3	L 26–40	16,121
November 1	8:00 pm	at Northern Illinois	Huskie Stadium; DeKalb, IL	ESPNU	L 20–45	4,790
November 9	8:00 pm	at Akron	InfoCision Stadium; Akron, OH	ESPNU	W 38–28	6,605
November 15	7:00 pm	Kent State	Doyt Perry Stadium; Bowling Green, OH (Anniversary Award)	ESPNU	W 42–7	13,612
November 25	2:30 pm	Buffalo	Doyt Perry Stadium; Bowling Green, OH	ESPN3	W 27–19	10,021
*Non-conference game; ^{†}Homecoming; Rankings from AP Poll released prior to game; All times are in Eastern time

Schedule source:

== Game summaries ==
=== At Ohio State ===
	1	2	3	4	Total
Falcons	7	3	0	0	10
#6 Buckeyes	21	14	21	21	77

=== North Dakota ===
	1	2	3	4	Total
#25 (FCS) Fighting Hawks	0	10	10	6	26
Falcons	14	7	6	0	27

=== Middle Tennessee ===
	1	2	3	4	Total
Blue Raiders	14	14	7	6	41
Falcons	14	7	0	0	21

=== At Memphis ===
	1	2	3	4	Total
Falcons	3	0	0	0	3
Tigers	35	21	14	7	77

=== Eastern Michigan ===
	1	2	3	4	Total
Eagles	7	0	14	7	28
Falcons	7	0	3	15	25

=== At Ohio ===
	1	2	3	4	Total
Falcons	0	7	10	7	24
Bobcats	3	20	7	0	30

=== At Toledo ===
	1	2	3	4	Total
Falcons	7	0	7	21	35
Rockets	7	7	13	15	42

=== Miami (Ohio) ===
	1	2	3	4	Total
RedHawks	7	12	7	14	40
Falcons	10	7	6	3	26

=== At Northern Illinois ===
	1	2	3	4	Total
Falcons	7	6	7	0	20
Huskies	14	10	14	7	45

=== At Akron ===
	1	2	3	4	Total
Falcons	7	14	7	10	38
Zips	0	10	10	8	28

=== Kent State ===
	1	2	3	4	Total
Golden Flashes	0	7	0	0	7
Falcons	7	14	7	14	42

=== Buffalo ===
	1	2	3	4	Total
Bulls	0	12	0	7	19
Falcons	7	7	6	7	27
