= 2016 Kent State Golden Flashes football team =

American college football season

2016 Kent State Golden Flashes football
- Conference: Mid-American Conference
- East Division
- Record: 3–9 (2–6 MAC)
- Head coach: Paul Haynes (4th season)
- Offensive coordinator: Don Treadwell (2nd season)
- Offensive scheme: Multiple
- Defensive coordinator: Ben Needham (1st season)
- Base defense: 4–3
- Home stadium: Dix Stadium

2016 Mid-American Conference football standings
	Conf.			Overall
Team	W		L	W		L
East Division
Ohio xy	6	–	2	8	–	6
Miami (OH) x	6	–	2	6	–	7
Akron	3	–	5	5	–	7
Bowling Green	3	–	5	4	–	8
Kent State	2	–	6	3	–	9
Buffalo	1	–	7	2	–	10
West Division
No. 15 Western Michigan xy$	8	–	0	13	–	1
Toledo	6	–	2	9	–	4
Northern Illinois	5	–	3	5	–	7
Eastern Michigan	4	–	4	7	–	6
Central Michigan	3	–	5	6	–	7
Ball State	1	–	7	4	–	8
Championship: Western Michigan 29, Ohio 23
$ – Conference champion; x – Division champion/co-champions; y – Championship game participant; Rankings from AP Poll

The 2016 Kent State Golden Flashes football team represented Kent State University in the 2016 NCAA Division I FBS football season. They were led by fourth-year head coach Paul Haynes and played their home games at Dix Stadium as a member of the East Division of the Mid-American Conference. They finished the season 3–9, 2–6 in MAC play to finish in fifth place in the East Division.

== Schedule ==
Date	Time	Opponent	Site	TV	Result	Attendance
September 3	3:30 pm	at Penn State*	Beaver Stadium; University Park, PA	BTN	L 13–33	94,378
September 10	6:00 pm	No. 23 (FCS) North Carolina A&T*	Dix Stadium; Kent, OH	ESPN3	L 36–39 ^{4OT}	13,540
September 17	3:30 pm	Monmouth (FCS)*	Dix Stadium; Kent, OH	ESPN3	W 27–7	14,265
September 24	12:00 pm	at No. 1 Alabama*	Bryant–Denny Stadium; Tuscaloosa, AL	SECN	L 0–48	101,821
October 1	3:30 pm	Akron^{†}	Dix Stadium; Kent, OH (Wagon Wheel)	ESPN3	L 27–31	20,167
October 8	3:30 pm	at Buffalo	University at Buffalo Stadium; Amherst, NY	ESPN3	W 44–20	20,532
October 15	2:30 pm	at Miami (OH)	Yager Stadium; Oxford, OH	ESPN3	L 14–18	15,160
October 22	1:00 pm	Ohio	Dix Stadium; Kent, OH	ESPN3	L 10–14	8,429
October 29	12:00 pm	at Central Michigan	Kelly/Shorts Stadium; Mount Pleasant, MI	CBSSN	W 27–24	9,236
November 8	7:30 pm	No. 14 Western Michigan	Dix Stadium; Kent, OH	ESPN2	L 21–37	4,536
November 15	7:00 pm	at Bowling Green	Doyt Perry Stadium; Bowling Green, OH (Anniversary Award)	ESPNU	L 7–42	13,612
November 25	12:00 pm	Northern Illinois	Dix Stadium; Kent, OH	CBSSN	L 21–31	4,450
*Non-conference game; ^{†}Homecoming; Rankings from AP Poll released prior to the game; All times are in Eastern time

== Game summaries ==
=== At Penn State ===
	1	2	3	4	Total
Golden Flashes	3	10	0	0	13
Nittany Lions	6	10	10	7	33

=== North Carolina A&T ===
	1	2	3	4	OT	Total
#23 (FCS) Aggies	0	0	10	7	22	39
Golden Flashes	3	7	7	0	19	36

=== Monmouth ===
	1	2	3	4	Total
Hawks	0	0	0	7	7
Golden Flashes	3	10	7	7	27

=== At Alabama ===
	1	2	3	4	Total
Golden Flashes	0	0	0	0	0
#1 Crimson Tide	21	20	7	0	48

=== Akron ===
	1	2	3	4	Total
Zips	3	7	7	14	31
Golden Flashes	7	10	0	10	27

=== At Buffalo ===
	1	2	3	4	Total
Golden Flashes	10	10	7	17	44
Bulls	0	3	3	14	20

=== At Miami (OH) ===
	1	2	3	4	Total
Golden Flashes	0	7	7	0	14
RedHawks	0	3	9	6	18

=== Ohio ===
	1	2	3	4	Total
Bobcats	7	7	0	0	14
Golden Flashes	0	3	7	0	10

=== At Central Michigan ===
	1	2	3	4	Total
Golden Flashes	3	7	7	10	27
Chippewas	0	10	14	0	24

=== Western Michigan ===
	1	2	3	4	Total
#14 Broncos	3	10	8	16	37
Golden Flashes	14	0	0	7	21

=== At Bowling Green ===
	1	2	3	4	Total
Golden Flashes	0	7	0	0	7
Falcons	7	14	7	14	42

=== Northern Illinois ===
	1	2	3	4	Total
Huskies	7	0	10	14	31
Golden Flashes	0	7	7	7	21
