= 2016 Northern Illinois Huskies football team =

American college football season

2016 Northern Illinois Huskies football
- Conference: Mid-American Conference
- West Division
- Record: 5–7 (5–3 MAC)
- Head coach: Rod Carey (4th season)
- Offensive coordinator: Mike Uremovich (1st season)
- Offensive scheme: Multiple
- Defensive coordinator: Kevin Kane (1st season)
- Base defense: 3–4
- MVP: Kenny Golladay
- Captains: Sean Folliard; Kenny Golladay; Jamaal Payton; Corey Thomas
- Home stadium: Huskie Stadium

2016 Mid-American Conference football standings
	Conf.			Overall
Team	W		L	W		L
East Division
Ohio xy	6	–	2	8	–	6
Miami (OH) x	6	–	2	6	–	7
Akron	3	–	5	5	–	7
Bowling Green	3	–	5	4	–	8
Kent State	2	–	6	3	–	9
Buffalo	1	–	7	2	–	10
West Division
No. 15 Western Michigan xy$	8	–	0	13	–	1
Toledo	6	–	2	9	–	4
Northern Illinois	5	–	3	5	–	7
Eastern Michigan	4	–	4	7	–	6
Central Michigan	3	–	5	6	–	7
Ball State	1	–	7	4	–	8
Championship: Western Michigan 29, Ohio 23
$ – Conference champion; x – Division champion/co-champions; y – Championship game participant; Rankings from AP Poll

The 2016 Northern Illinois Huskies football team represented Northern Illinois University as a member of the West Division of the Mid-American Conference (MAC) during the 2016 NCAA Division I FBS football season. Led by fourth-year head coach Rod Carey, the Huskies compiled an overall record of 5–7 with a mark of 5–3 in conference play, placing third in the MAC's West Division. The team played home games at Huskie Stadium in DeKalb, Illinois.

== Preseason ==
For the second straight year, the Huskies were picked to finish third in the division in 2016 in the poll released during the 2016 MAC Media Day at Ford Field in Detroit.

== Schedule ==
Date	Time	Opponent	Site	TV	Result	Attendance	Source
September 3	9:30 p.m.	at Wyoming*	War Memorial Stadium; Laramie, WY	CBSSN	L 34–40 ^{3OT}	18,483	
September 10	6:30 p.m.	at South Florida*	Raymond James Stadium; Tampa, FL	CBSSN	L 17–48	36,557	
September 17	2:30 p.m.	San Diego State*	Huskie Stadium; DeKalb, IL	CBSSN	L 28–42	14,513	
September 24	2:30 p.m.	No. 13 Western Illinois*	Huskie Stadium; DeKalb, IL	ESPN3	L 23–28	15,496	
October 1	2:30 p.m.	at Ball State	Scheumann Stadium; Muncie, IN (Bronze Stalk Trophy)	ASN	W 31–24	7,249	
October 8	5:30 p.m.	at Western Michigan	Waldo Stadium; Kalamazoo, MI	CBSSN	L 30–45	28,042	
October 15	2:30 p.m.	Central Michigan	Huskie Stadium; DeKalb, IL	ESPN3	L 28–34 ^{3OT}	8,495	
October 22	2:30 p.m.	Buffalo	Huskie Stadium; DeKalb, IL	ESPN3	W 44–7	11,801	
November 1	7:00 p.m.	Bowling Green	Huskie Stadium; DeKalb, IL	ESPNU	W 45–20	4,790	
November 9	7:00 p.m.	vs. Toledo	Guaranteed Rate Field; Chicago, IL (Huskie Chi–Town Showdown)	ESPN2	L 24–31	10,180	
November 16	7:00 p.m.	at Eastern Michigan	Rynearson Stadium; Ypsilanti, MI	ESPNU	W 31–24 ^{OT}	15,603	
November 25	11:00 a.m.	at Kent State	Dix Stadium; Kent, OH	CBSSN	W 31–21	4,450	
*Non-conference game; Rankings from STATS Poll released prior to the game; All times are in Central time

== Game summaries ==
=== Wyoming ===
NIU at Wyoming

Team	1	2	3	4	OT	2OT	3OT	Total
NIU	7	6	7	7	0	7	0	34
• Wyoming	3	10	14	0	0	7	6	40

- Date: September 3, 2016
- Location:
  War Memorial Stadium
  Laramie, WY
- Game start: 10:20 p.m.
- Elapsed time: 4:14
- Game attendance: 18,483
- Game weather: Temperature: 57 °F (14 °C) • Wind: SSE 10 mph • Weather: Mostly cloudy
- Referee: Kevin Hassell
- TV announcers (CBSSN): Dwayne Ballen (play-by-play), Adam Archuleta (analyst), Cassie McKinney (sideline)

Scoring summary
1	08:03	NIU	Kenny Golloday 39 yard pass from Drew Hare (Christian Hagan kick), 10 plays, 81 yards, TOP 4:11	7–0 NIU
1	00:43	WYO	Cooper Rothe 35 yard field goal, 10 plays, 30 yards, TOP 4:14	7–3 NIU
2	14:19	NIU	Kenny Golloday 34 yard run (Christian Hagan kick failed), 3 plays, 75 yards, TOP 1:24	13–3 NIU
2	11:42	WYO	Brian Hill 2 yard run (Cooper Rothe kick), 6 plays, 52 yards, TOP 2:37	13–10 NIU
2	04:32	WYO	Cooper Rothe 29 yard field goal, 13 plays, 62 yards, TOP 6:12	13–13 TIE
3	09:50	WYO	Tanner Gentry 17 yard pass from Josh Allen (Cooper Rothe kick), 4 plays, 75 yards, TOP 1:38	20–13 WYO
3	07:03	NIU	Kenny Golladay 27 yard pass from Drew Hare (Christian Hagan kick), 7 plays, 64 yards, TOP 2:47	20–20 TIE
3	01:39	WYO	Jacob Hollister 2 yard pass from Josh Allen (Cooper Rothe kick), 10 plays, 80 yards, TOP 5:24	27–20 WYO
4	01:13	NIU	Shane Wimann 19 yard pass from Drew Hare (Christian Hagan kick), 10 plays, 77 yards, TOP 1:59	27–27 TIE
2OT	15:00	WYO	Brian Hill 5 yard run (Cooper Rothe kick), 7 plays, 0 yards, TOP 0:00	34–27 WYO
2OT	15:00	NIU	Drew Hare 1 yard run (Christian Hagan kick), 5 plays, 0 yards, TOP 0:00	34–34 TIE
3OT	15:00	WYO	Josh Allen 7 yard run, 5 plays, 0 yards, TOP 0:00	40–34 WYO

The Cowboys beat the Huskies in triple overtime, 40–34. NIU quarterback Drew Hare went 24-for-39 for 327 yards, with three touchdowns and no interceptions. Receiver Kenny Golladay gained 144 yards on 10 catches with one touchdown and got 82 yards and another touchdown rushing. However, the Huskies had 12 penalties for 108 yards. The game was scheduled to start at 8:30 p.m. Mountain Time, but began almost two hours late due to lightning. The game ended at 2:35 a.m. MT, which was 3:35 a.m. for NIU fans back in Illinois.

=== South Florida ===
NIU at South Florida

Team	1	2	3	4	Total
NIU	0	7	0	10	17
• South Florida	14	13	14	7	48

- Date: September 10, 2016
- Location:
  Raymond James Stadium
  Tampa, FL
- Game start: 7:08 p.m. ET
- Elapsed time: 3:35
- Game attendance: 36,557
- Game weather: Temperature: 88 °F (31 °C) • Wind: E 5 mph • Weather: Mostly cloudy
- Referee: Tom Stapleton
- TV announcers (CBSSN): Dwayne Ballen (play-by-play), Corey Chavous (analyst)

Scoring summary
1	06:39	USF	Rodney Adams 11 yard run (Emilio Nadelman kick), 10 plays, 80 yards, TOP 3:16	7–0 USF
1	03:25	USF	Ryeshene Bronson 73 yard pass from Quinton Flowers (Emilio Nadelman kick), 3 plays, 84 yards, TOP 1:15	14–0 USF
2	14:05	USF	Emilio Nadelman 31 yard field goal, 8 plays, 59 yards, TOP 2:28	17–0 USF
2	11:07	USF	Rodney Adams 26 yard pass from Quinton Flowers (Emilio Nadelman kick), 5 plays, 74 yards, TOP 2:06	24–0 USF
2	5:17	USF	Emilio Nadelman 34 yard field goal, 8 plays, 39 yards, TOP 5:17	27–0 USF
2	01:36	NIU	Aregeros Turner 4 yard run (Christian Hagan kick), 9 plays, 75 yards, TOP 1:36	27–7 USF
3	08:05	USF	D'Ernest Johnson 13 yard pass from Quinton Flowers (Emilio Nadelman kick), 7 plays, 79 yards, TOP 1:56	34–7 USF
3	04:27	USF	Chris Barr 6 yard pass from Quinton Flowers (Emilio Nadelman kick), 8 plays, 41 yards, TOP 2:31	41–7 USF
4	13:31	USF	Darius Tice 11 yard run (Emilio Nadelman kick), 11 plays, 92 yards, TOP 3:56	48–7 USF
4	10:09	NIU	Aregeros Turner 11 yard pass from Ryan Graham (Christian Hagan kick), 8 plays, 75 yards, TOP 3:22	48–14 USF
4	02:34	NIU	Christian Hagan 22 yard field goal, 6 plays, 20 yards, TOP 2:34	48–17 USF

=== San Diego State ===
San Diego State at NIU

Team	1	2	3	4	Total
• San Diego State	14	14	0	14	42
NIU	0	7	14	7	28

- Date: September 17, 2016
- Location:
  Huskie Stadium
  DeKalb, IL
- Game start: 2:37 p.m.
- Elapsed time: 3:40
- Game attendance: 14,513
- Game weather: Temperature: 78 °F (26 °C) • Wind: W 15 mph • Weather: Partly sunny
- Referee: Scott Campbell
- TV announcers (CBSSN): Ben Holden (play-by-play), Jay Feely (analyst)

Scoring summary
1	07:19	SDSU	Donnie Pumphrey 46 yard run (John Baron kick), 1 play, 46 yards, TOP 0:09	7–0 SDSU
1	01:08	SDSU	Rashaad Penny 27 yard pass from Christian Chapman (John Baron kick), 6 plays, 68 yards, TOP 3:16	14–0 SDSU
2	14:09	SDSU	Kahale Warring 5 yard pass from Christian Chapman (John Baron kick), 4 plays, 13 yards, TOP 1:43	21–0 SDSU
2	06:19	SDSU	Mikah Holder 33 yard pass from Christian Chapman (John Baron kick), 3 plays, 45 yards, TOP 1:14	28–0 SDSU
2	03:52	NIU	Kenny Golladay 12 yard run (Christian Hagan kick), 7 plays, 65 yards, TOP 2:27	28–7 SDSU
3	12:03	NIU	Kenny Golladay 49 yard pass from Ryan Graham (Christian Hagan kick), 2 plays, 54 yards, TOP 0:31	28–14 SDSU
3	7:46	NIU	Shane Wimann 14 yard pass from Ryan Graham (Christian Hagan kick), 7 plays, 73 yards, TOP 3:08	28–21 SDSU
4	14:54	SDSU	Donne Pumphrey 33 yard run (John Baron kick), 5 plays, 53 yards, TOP 1:44	35–21 SDSU
4	8:02	NIU	Shane Wimann 7 yard pass from Ryan Graham (Christian Hagan kick), 16 plays, 65 yards, TOP 6:43	35–28 SDSU
4	07:40	SDSU	Donne Pumphrey 79 yard run (John Baron kick), 2 plays, 79 yards, TOP 0:17	42–28 SDSU

=== Western Illinois ===
Western Illinois at NIU

Team	1	2	3	4	Total
• Western Illinois	14	0	14	0	28
NIU	0	7	0	16	23

- Date: September 24, 2016
- Location:
  Huskie Stadium
  DeKalb, IL
- Game start: 2:30 p.m.
- Elapsed time: 3:24
- Game attendance: 15,496
- Game weather: Temperature: 74 °F (23 °C) • Wind: E 9 mph • Weather: Cloudy
- Referee: Ron Hudson
- Television network: ESPN3

Scoring summary
1	06:52	WIU	Steve McShane 11 yard run (Nathan Knuffman kick), 8 plays, 80 yards, TOP 3:39	7–0 WIU
1	01:00	WIU	Jamie Gilmore 1 yard run (Nathan Knuffman kick), 9 plays 62 yards, TOP 4:26	14–0 WIU
2	12:40	NIU	Shane Wimann 2 yard pass from Ryan Graham (Christian Hagan kick), 10 plays, 75 yards, TOP 3:20	14–7 WIU
3	11:18	WIU	Sean McGuire 1 yard run (Nathan Knuffman kick), 7 plasy, 75 yards, TOP 3:50	21–7 WIU
3	07:20	WIU	Isaiah Lesure 3 yard pass from Sean McGuire (Nathan Knuffman kick), 5 plays, 23 yards, TOP 1:30	28–7 WIU
4	14:07	NIU	Christian Hagan 27 yard field goal, 10 plays, 72 yards, TOP 3:41	28–10 WIU
4	11:44	NIU	Joran Huff 23 yard run (Christian Hagan kick), 2 plays 23 yards	28–17 WIU
4	08:15	NIU	Kenny Golladay 39 yard pass from Anthony Maddie (two-point pass conv. failed), 6 plays 60 yards, TOP 1:16	28–23 WIU

=== Ball State ===
NIU at Ball State
Bronze Stalk Trophy

Team	1	2	3	4	Total
• NIU	10	14	0	7	31
Ball State	10	7	0	7	24

- Date: October 1, 2016
- Location:
  Scheumann Stadium
  Muncie, IN
- Game start: 3:36 p.m. EDT
- Elapsed time: 3:21
- Game attendance: 7,249
- Game weather: Temperature: 63 °F (17 °C) • Wind: WSW 8 mph • Weather: Overcast with showers
- Referee: Timothy O'Dey
- Television network: ASN/ESPN3

Scoring summary
1	10:33	BSU	Morgan Hagee 26 yard field goal, 9 plays, 65 yards, TOP 2:08	3–0 BSU
1	08:33	NIU	Christian Hagan 41 yard field goal, 8 plays, 59 yards, TOP 1:52	3–3 TIE
1	01:08	NIU	Anthony Maddie 75 yard run (Christian Hagan kick), 4 plays, 97 yards, TOP: 1:13	10–3 NIU
1	00:15	BSU	James Gilber 11 yard run (Morgan Hagee kick), 4 plays, 57 yards, TOP: 0:45	10–10 TIE
2	13:47	BSU	James Gilber 3 yard run (Morgan Hagee kick), 4 plays, 44 yards, TOP: 1:05	17–10 BSU
2	11:16	NIU	Kenny Golladay 14 yard pass from Anthony Maddie (Christian Hagan kick), 7 plays, 67 yards, TOP: 2:26	17–17 TIE
2	01:26	NIU	Joel Bouagnon 2 yard run (Christian Hagan kick), 9 plays, 80 yards, TOP: 3:01	24–17 NIU
4	12:26	BSU	James Gilber 3 yard run (Morgan Hagee kick), 10 plays 43 yards, TOP: 3:44	24–24 TIE
4	11:14	NIU	Kenny Golladay 22 yard pass from Anthony Maddie, (Christian Hagan kick), 6 plays 60 yards, TOP: 1:03	31–24 NIU

=== Western Michigan ===
NIU at Western Michigan

Team	1	2	3	4	Total
NIU	0	17	6	7	30
• Western Michigan	14	7	10	14	45

- Date: October 8, 2016
- Location:
  Waldo Stadium
  Kalamazoo, MI
- Game start: 6:35 p.m. EDT
- Elapsed time: 3:41
- Game attendance: 28,042
- Game weather: Temperature: 56 °F (13 °C) • Wind: 10 mph • Weather: Clear
- Referee: Larry Smith
- TV announcers (CBSSN): Ben Holden (play-by-play), Jay Feely (analyst)

Scoring summary
1	12:42	WMU	J Franklin 32 yard pass from Zach Terrell (Butch Hampton kick), 6 plays, 78 yards, TOP 2:18	7–0 WMU
1	00:46	WMU	Corey Davis 20 yard pass from Zach Terrell (Butch Hampton kick), 8 plays, 80 yards, TOP 3:03	14–0 WMU
2	14:18	NIU	Christian Blake 2 yard run (Christian Hagan kick), 5 plays, 70 yards TOP: 1:28	14–7 WMU
2	10:05	WMU	J Franklin 1 yard run (Butch Hampton kick), 9 plays 65 yards, TOP: 4:13	21–7 WMU
2	06:09	NIU	Shane Wimann 26 yard pass from Anthony Maddie (Christian Hagan kick), 9 plays 65 yards, TOP: 3:56	21–14 WMU
2	03:01	NIU	Christian Hagan 30 yard field goal, 7 plays, 55 yards, TOP: 2:09	21–17 WMU
3	10:26	NIU	Christian Hagan 19 yard field goal, 12 plays, 75 yards, TOP: 4:34	21–20 WMU
2	05:21	WMU	Butch Hampton 23 yard field goal, 11 plays, 84 yards, TOP: 5:05	24–20 WMU
3	02:56	NIU	Christian Hagan 37 yard field goal, 7 plays, 70 yards, TOP: 2:25	24–23 WMU
3	00:22	WMU	Corey Davis 8 yard pass from Zach Terrell (Butch Hampton kick), 5 plays, 69 yards, TOP: 2:34	31–23 WMU
4	12:04	WMU	Davon Tucker 26 yard run (Butch Hampton kick), 5 plays 87 yards, TOP: 2:10	38–23 WMU
4	08:38	NIU	Anthony Maddie 8 yard run (Christian Hagan kick), 9 plays, 62 yards, TOP: 3:26	38–30 WMU
4	05:20	WMU	Zach Terrell 2 yard run (Butch Hampton kick), 6 plays 86 yards, TOP: 3:18	45–30 WMU

=== Central Michigan ===
Central Michigan at NIU

Team	1	2	3	4	OT	2OT	3OT	Total
• Central Michigan	0	14	0	7	0	7	6	34
NIU	0	7	7	7	0	7	0	28

- Date: October 15, 2016
- Location:
  Huskie Stadium
  DeKalb, IL
- Game start: 2:30 p.m. CDT
- Elapsed time: 3:33
- Game attendance: 8,495
- Game weather: Temperature: 69 °F (21 °C) • Wind: S 20 mph • Weather: Cloudy
- Referee: Ron Hudson
- Television network: ESPN3

Scoring summary
2	08:38	CMU	Thomas Thomas 11 yard pass from Cooper Rush (Brian Eavey kick), 3 plays, 18 yards, TOP 0:59	7–0 CMU
2	06:30	NIU	Christian Blake 17 yard pass from Anthony Maddie (Christian Hagan kick), 6 plays, 75 yards, TOP 2:08	7–7 TIE
2	00:42	CMU	Jahray Hayes 3 yard run (Brian Eavey kick), 11 plays, 65 yards, TOP 5:48	14–7 CMU
3	00:31	NIU	Aregero Turner 11 yard pass from Anthony Maddie (Christian Hagan kick), 13 plays, 80 yards, TOP 5:06	14–14 TIE
4	04:21	CMU	Devon Spalding 58 yard run (Brian Eavey kick), 4 plays, 80 yards, TOP 1:57	21–14 CMU
4	03:43	NIU	Aregero Turner 53 yard run (Christian Hagan kick), 2 plays, 61 yards, TOP 0:32	21–21 TIE
2OT	15:00	CMU	Corey Willis 25 yard pass from Cooper Rush (Brian Eavey kick), 2 plays, 25 yards, TOP 0:00	28–21 CMU
2OT	15:00	NIU	Joel Bouagnon 13 yard pass from Anthony Maddie (Christian Hagan kick), 5 plays, 25 yards, TOP 0:00	28–28 TIE
3OT	15:00	CMU	Tyler Conklin 25 yard pass from Cooper Rush, 1 plays, 25 yards, TOP 0:00	34–28 CMU

=== Buffalo ===
Buffalo at NIU

Team	1	2	3	4	Total
Buffalo	0	7	0	0	7
• NIU	10	20	7	7	44

- Date: October 22, 2016
- Location:
  Huskie Stadium
  DeKalb, IL
- Game start: 2:30 p.m. CDT
- Elapsed time: 3:12
- Game attendance: 11,801
- Game weather: Temperature: 58 °F (14 °C) • Wind: S 14 mph • Weather: Mostly cloudy
- Referee: Greg Sujack
- Television network: ESPN3

Scoring summary
1	14:48	NIU	Aregero Turner 97 yard kickoff return (Christian Hagan kick)	7–0 NIU
1	06:14	NIU	Christian Hagan 25 yard field goal, 12 plays, 52 yards, TOP 4:01	10–0 NIU
2	14:53	BUFF	Jordan Johnson 29 yard run (Adam Mitcheson kick), 7 plays, 90 yards, TOP 2:59	10–7 NIU
2	10:52	NIU	Anthony Maddie 15 yard run (Christian Hagan kick), 5 plays, 41 yards, TOP 1:38	17–7 NIU
2	07:14	NIU	Anthony Maddie 16 yard run (Christian Hagan kick), 6 plays, 74 yards, TOP 2:15	24–7 NIU
2	00:18	NIU	Anthony Maddie 3 yard run (two-point run conv.), 5 plays, 80 yards, TOP 0:46	30–7 NIU
3	07:16	NIU	Kenny Golladay 22 yard pass from Anthony Maddie (Christian Hagan kick), 9 plays, 65 yards, TOP 2:56	37–7 NIU
4	09:04	NIU	Anthony Maddie 23 yard run (Christian Hagan kick), 10 plays, 95 yards, TOP 4:24	44–7 NIU

=== Bowling Green ===
Bowling Green at NIU

Team	1	2	3	4	Total
Bowling Green	7	6	7	0	20
• NIU	14	10	14	7	45

- Date: November 1, 2016
- Location:
  Huskie Stadium
  DeKalb, IL
- Game start: 7:00 p.m. CDT
- Elapsed time: 3:31
- Game attendance: 4,790
- Game weather: Temperature: 66 °F (19 °C) • Wind: SSW 5 mph • Weather: Clear
- Referee: Mark Kluczynski
- Television network: ESPNU

Scoring summary
1	10:05	NIU	Joel Bouagnon 14 yard run (Christian Hagan kick), 9 plays, 75 yards, TOP 3:41	7–0 NIU
1	04:39	BGSU	Scott Miller 2 yard pass from James Morgan (Jake Suder kick), 12 plays, 75 yards, TOP 5:26	7–7 TIE
1	00:53	NIU	Joel Bouagnon 1 yard run (Christian Hagan kick), 11 plays, 80 yards, TOP 3:46	14–7 NIU
2	13:44	NIU	Christian Hagan 41 yard field goal, 5 plays, 20 yards, TOP 1:17	17–7 NIU
2	12:30	BGSU	Ronnie Moore 37 yard pass from James Morgan (Jake Suder kick blocked), 3 plays, 72 yards, TOP 1:14	17–13 NIU
2	07:10	NIU	Anthony Maddie 2 yard run (Christian Hagan kick), 15 plays, 75 yards, TOP 5:20	24–13 NIU
3	09:47	NIU	Joel Bouagnon 2 yard run (Christian Hagan kick), 4 plays, 24 yards, TOP 1:28	31–13 NIU
3	03:03	BGSU	Teo Redding 5 yard pass from James Morgan (Jake Suder kick), 9 plays, 71 yards, TOP 2:59	31–20 NIU
3	00:45	NIU	Joel Bouagnon 15 yard run (Christian Hagan kick), 7 plays, 75 yards, TOP 2:18	38–20 NIU
4	01:40	NIU	Joel Bouagnon 6 yard run (Christian Hagan kick), 5 plays, 30 yards, TOP 2:42	45–20 NIU

=== Toledo ===
Toledo at NIU

Team	1	2	3	4	Total
• Toledo	0	3	14	14	31
NIU	7	7	7	3	24

- Date: November 9, 2016
- Location:
  Guaranteed Rate Field
  Chicago, IL
- Game start: 7:00 p.m. CST
- Elapsed time: 3:39
- Game attendance: 10,180
- Game weather: Temperature: 51 °F (11 °C) • Wind: W 5 mph • Weather: Clear
- Referee: Larry Smith
- Television network: ESPN2

Scoring summary
1	00:22	NIU	Shane Wimann 1 yard pass from Ryan Graham (Christian Hagan kick), 11 plays, 71 yards, TOP 4:55	7–0 NIU
2	12:06	TOL	Jameson Vest 44 yard field goal, 10 plays, 48 yards, TOP 3:16	7–3 NIU
2	07:41	NIU	Kenny Golladay 4 yard pass from Ryan Graham (Christian Hagan kick), 12 plays, 86 yards, TOP 4:15	14–3 NIU
3	11:59	TOL	Michael Roberts 27 yard pass from Logan Woodside (Jameson Vest kick), 6 plays, 52 yards, TOP 2:22	14–10 NIU
3	06:09	NIU	Christian Blake 19 yard pass from Ryan Graham (Christian Hagan kick), 14 plays, 75 yards, TOP 5:41	21–10 NIU
3	03:23	TOL	Jon'Vea Johnson 36 yard pass from Logan Woodside (Jameson Vest kick), 7 plays, 76 yards, TOP 2:33	21–17 NIU
4	12:32	TOL	Michael Roberts 5 yard pass from Logan Woodside (Jameson Vest kick), 7 plays, 57 yards, TOP 2:42	24–21 TOL
4	04:31	NIU	Christian Hagan 22 yard field goal, 12 plays, 73 yards, TOP 4:27	24–24 TIE
4	01:15	TOL	Kareem Hunt 1 yard run (Jameson Vest kick), 9 plays, 71 yards, TOP 3:08	31–24 TOL

The Huskies lost to the Rockets 31–24. The loss eliminated Northern Illinois from bowl game eligibility, ending their conference-record streak of eight straight bowl games. NIU had beaten Toledo in their six previous matchups. This was the first football game ever played at Guaranteed Rate Field, the recently renamed stadium of the Chicago White Sox.

=== Eastern Michigan ===
NIU at Eastern Michigan

Team	1	2	3	4	OT	Total
• NIU	0	0	17	7	7	31
Eastern Michigan	14	7	0	3	0	24

- Date: November 16, 2016
- Location:
  Rynearson Stadium
  Ypsilanti, MI
- Game start: 7:02 p.m. CST
- Elapsed time: 3:54
- Game attendance: 15,603
- Game weather: 46 F Wind: N 5 MPH, Weather: Clear
- Referee: Ron Hudson
- TV announcers (ESPNU): Kevin Brown (play-by-play), Craig Haubert (analyst)

Scoring summary
1	12:26	EMU	ERIKSEN, Ian 27 yd run (FRICANO, Paul kick), 8 plays, 82 yards, TOP 2:34	7–0 EMU
1	01:56	EMU	BAILEY, Sergio 13 yd pass from ROBACK, Brogan (FRICANO, Paul kick), 8 plays, 80 yards, TOP 3:00	14–0 EMU
2	01:12	EMU	ERIKSEN, Ian 1 yd run (FRICANO, Paul kick), 8 plays, 33 yards, TOP 2:36	21–0 EMU
3	14:41	NIU	HUFF, Jordan 60 yd run (HAGAN, Christian kick), 1 play, 60 yards, TOP 0:16	21–7 EMU
3	05:32	NIU	TURNER, Aregero 74 yd pass from SANTACATERINA D (HAGAN, Christian kick), 2 plays, 78 yards, TOP 0:43	21–14 EMU
3	02:36	NIU	HAGAN, Christian 33 yd field goal, 5 plays, 41 yards, TOP 1:01	21–17 EMU
4	13:45	NIU	HUFF, Jordan 27 yd run (HAGAN, Christian kick), 7 plays, 55 yards, TOP 2:40	24–21 NIU
4	00:43	EMU	FRICANO, Paul 24 yd field goal, 16 plays, 63 yards, TOP 6:03	24–24 TIE
OT	15:00	NIU	HUFF, Jordan 2 yd run (HAGAN, Christian kick), 6 plays, 25 yards, TOP 0:00	31–24 NIU

=== Kent State ===
NIU at Kent State

Team	1	2	3	4	Total
• NIU	7	0	10	14	31
Kent State	0	7	7	7	21

- Date: November 25, 2016
- Location:
  Dix Stadium
  Kent, OH
- Game start: TBA

Scoring summary

== Postseason awards ==
=== All-MAC ===
Team	Player	Position	Year
1st	Max Scharping	OL	SO
1st	Kenny Golladay	WR	SR
1st	Aregeros Turner	Return Spec.	SR
2nd	Levon Myers	OL	SR
2nd	Joel Bouagnon	RB	SR
2nd	Shawun Lurry	DB	JR
