= 2016 Miami RedHawks football team =

American college football season

2016 Miami RedHawks football

MAC East Division co-champion

St. Petersburg Bowl, L 16–17 vs. Mississippi State
- Conference: Mid-American Conference
- East Division
- Record: 6–7 (6–2 MAC)
- Head coach: Chuck Martin (3rd season)
- Co-offensive coordinators: George Barnett (3rd season); Eric Koehler (3rd season)
- Offensive scheme: Multiple
- Co-defensive coordinators: Matt Pawlowski (3rd season); John Hauser (1st season)
- Base defense: 4–3
- Home stadium: Yager Stadium

2016 Mid-American Conference football standings
	Conf.			Overall
Team	W		L	W		L
East Division
Ohio xy	6	–	2	8	–	6
Miami (OH) x	6	–	2	6	–	7
Akron	3	–	5	5	–	7
Bowling Green	3	–	5	4	–	8
Kent State	2	–	6	3	–	9
Buffalo	1	–	7	2	–	10
West Division
No. 15 Western Michigan xy$	8	–	0	13	–	1
Toledo	6	–	2	9	–	4
Northern Illinois	5	–	3	5	–	7
Eastern Michigan	4	–	4	7	–	6
Central Michigan	3	–	5	6	–	7
Ball State	1	–	7	4	–	8
Championship: Western Michigan 29, Ohio 23
$ – Conference champion; x – Division champion/co-champions; y – Championship game participant; Rankings from AP Poll

The 2016 Miami RedHawks football team represented Miami University in the 2016 NCAA Division I FBS football season. They were led by third-year head coach Chuck Martin, played their home games at Yager Stadium, and competed as a member of the East Division of the Mid-American Conference. They finished the season 6–7, 6–2 in MAC play to finish in a tie for the East Division championship with Ohio. Due to their head-to-head loss to Ohio, they did not represent the East Division in the MAC Championship Game. They were invited to the St. Petersburg Bowl where they lost to Mississippi State.

Miami became the first team in FBS history to start the regular season 0–6 and finish the regular season at 6–6.

== Schedule ==
Date	Time	Opponent	Site	TV	Result	Attendance
September 3	3:30 p.m.	at No. 17 Iowa*	Kinnick Stadium; Iowa City, IA	ESPNU	L 21–45	68,390
September 10	3:30 p.m.	Eastern Illinois*	Yager Stadium; Oxford, OH	ESPN3	L 17–21	17,369
September 17	3:30 p.m.	WKU*^{†}	Yager Stadium; Oxford, OH	ESPN3	L 24–31	19,822
September 24	3:30 p.m.	at Cincinnati*	Nippert Stadium; Cincinnati, OH (Victory Bell)	ESPNews	L 20–27	38,112
October 1	2:30 p.m.	Ohio	Yager Stadium; Oxford, OH (Battle of the Bricks)	BCSN2	L 7–17	22,212
October 8	3:00 p.m.	at Akron	InfoCision Stadium–Summa Field; Akron, OH	ESPN3	L 13–35	11,094
October 15	2:30 p.m.	Kent State	Yager Stadium; Oxford, OH	ESPN3	W 18–14	15,160
October 22	12:00 p.m.	at Bowling Green	Doyt Perry Stadium; Bowling Green, OH	ESPN3	W 40–26	16,121
October 29	3:30 p.m.	at Eastern Michigan	Rynearson Stadium; Ypsilanti, MI	ASN, ESPN3	W 28–15	16,481
November 4	6:00 p.m.	Central Michigan	Yager Stadium; Oxford, OH	CBSSN	W 37–17	14,270
November 12	1:00 p.m.	at Buffalo	University at Buffalo Stadium; Amherst, NY	ESPN3	W 35–24	15,447
November 22	7:00 p.m.	Ball State	Yager Stadium; Oxford, OH	ESPN3	W 21–20	13,824
December 26	11:00 a.m.	vs. Mississippi State*	Tropicana Field; St. Petersburg, FL (St. Petersburg Bowl)	ESPN	L 16–17	15,717
*Non-conference game; ^{†}Homecoming; Rankings from AP Poll released prior to the game; All times are in Eastern time

== Game summaries ==
=== At Iowa ===
	1	2	3	4	Total
RedHawks	0	7	7	7	21
Hawkeyes	21	7	7	10	45

=== Eastern Illinois ===
	1	2	3	4	Total
Panthers	0	7	0	14	21
RedHawks	3	7	7	0	17

=== WKU ===
	1	2	3	4	Total
Hilltoppers	0	14	10	7	31
RedHawks	0	3	14	7	24

=== At Cincinnati ===
	1	2	3	4	Total
RedHawks	7	3	10	0	20
Bearcats	3	7	7	10	27

=== Ohio ===
	1	2	3	4	Total
Bobcats	3	7	0	7	17
RedHawks	0	0	7	0	7

=== At Akron ===
	1	2	3	4	Total
RedHawks	3	3	7	0	13
Zips	14	7	7	7	35

=== Kent State ===
	1	2	3	4	Total
Golden Flashes	0	7	7	0	14
RedHawks	0	3	9	6	18

=== At Bowling Green ===
	1	2	3	4	Total
RedHawks	7	12	7	14	40
Falcons	10	7	6	3	26

=== At Eastern Michigan ===
	1	2	3	4	Total
RedHawks	14	0	7	7	28
Eagles	0	3	0	12	15

=== Central Michigan ===
	1	2	3	4	Total
Chippewas	7	10	0	0	17
RedHawks	13	7	10	7	37

=== At Buffalo ===
	1	2	3	4	Total
RedHawks	13	7	12	3	35
Bulls	0	7	3	14	24

=== Ball State ===
	1	2	3	4	Total
Cardinals	7	10	3	0	20
RedHawks	7	0	7	7	21

=== Mississippi State–St. Petersburg Bowl ===
	1	2	3	4	Total
RedHawks	3	6	7	0	16
Bulldogs	0	7	7	3	17
