= 2016 MAC Championship Game =

2016 Marathon MAC Championship Game
- Conference Championship
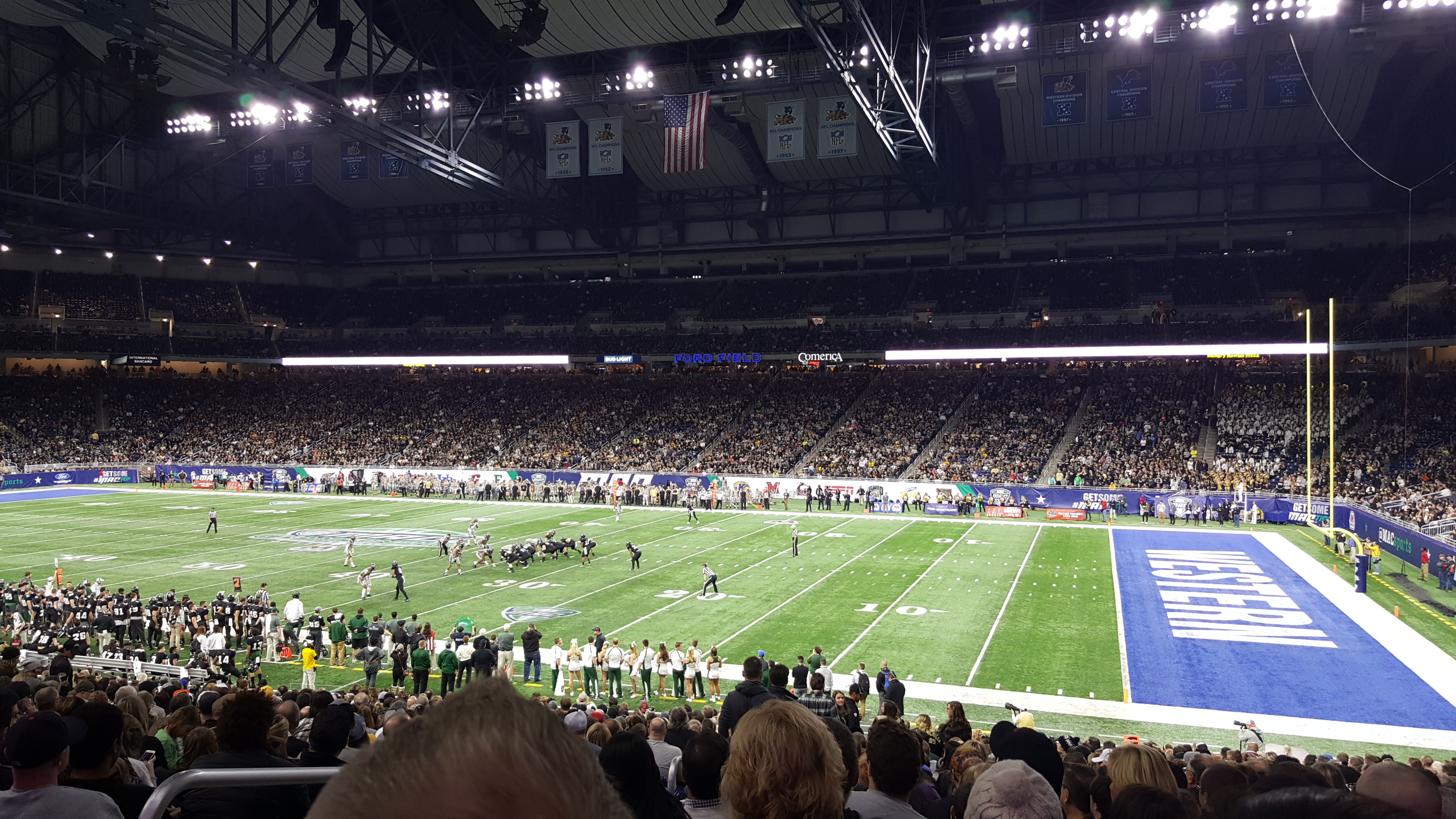
- The Ohio University Bobcats line up on offense against the Western Michigan University Broncos
Western Michigan Broncos	Ohio Bobcats
(12–0)	(8–4)
29	23
Head coach: P. J. Fleck	Head coach: Frank Solich
AP / Coaches / CFP; 13 / 14 / 17
	1	2	3	4	Total
Western Michigan	6	17	3	3	29
Ohio	0	7	13	3	23
- Date: December 2, 2016
- Season: 2016
- Stadium: Ford Field
- Location: Detroit, Michigan
- MVP: Corey Davis (WR, WMU)
- Favorite: Western Michigan by 16.5
- Attendance: 45,615

United States TV coverage
- Network: ESPN2/IMG College
- Announcers: Adam Amin, Mack Brown, Molly McGrath (ESPN2); David Shumate, Jon Jansen (IMG College)

2016 Mid-American Conference football standings
	Conf.			Overall
Team	W		L	W		L
East Division
Ohio xy	6	–	2	8	–	6
Miami (OH) x	6	–	2	6	–	7
Akron	3	–	5	5	–	7
Bowling Green	3	–	5	4	–	8
Kent State	2	–	6	3	–	9
Buffalo	1	–	7	2	–	10
West Division
No. 15 Western Michigan xy$	8	–	0	13	–	1
Toledo	6	–	2	9	–	4
Northern Illinois	5	–	3	5	–	7
Eastern Michigan	4	–	4	7	–	6
Central Michigan	3	–	5	6	–	7
Ball State	1	–	7	4	–	8
Championship: Western Michigan 29, Ohio 23
$ – Conference champion; x – Division champion/co-champions; y – Championship game participant; Rankings from AP Poll

The 2016 MAC Championship Game was an NCAA Division I college football conference championship game for the Mid-American Conference (MAC). It was the 20th MAC Football Championship Game and was played at Ford Field in Detroit on Friday, December 2, 2016, televised on ESPN2. The game featured the East Division co-champion Ohio Bobcats against the outright West Division champion Western Michigan Broncos.

== Teams ==
The Ohio Bobcats clinched their spot in the 2016 MAC Championship Game by beating Akron 9–3 in their final regular season game. They tied with divisional rival Miami for the East title, but advanced to the MAC title game by virtue of their 17–7 win at Miami on October 1. Under 12th year head coach Frank Solich, the Bobcats finished the regular season with an 8–4 record, with key wins coming against Kansas and Toledo. Ohio finished 1–1 against Power 5 teams; they lost to Tennessee (from the SEC) and beat Kansas (from the Big 12).

The Western Michigan Broncos earned a spot in the 2016 MAC Championship Game after winning the MAC West outright by defeating Toledo 55–35 in their final home game. Under fourth year head coach P. J. Fleck, the Broncos finished the regular season with a perfect record, defeating both Big Ten Conference teams they faced (Northwestern and Illinois). The Broncos also defeated archrival Central Michigan for the third straight year by a score of 49–10.

== Game summary ==
The Broncos opened the game with two first-quarter field goals, and the first quarter ended 6–0 in favor of the undefeated Broncos. Western Michigan had outscored opponents 135–59 in the first quarter during the season. They started the second quarter with their third field goal of the game, and extended their lead to nine. Ohio got on the scoreboard in the second quarter with an eight-yard touchdown pass from quarterback Greg Windham to Jordan Reid and cut the Broncos' lead to three, the closest the game had been since WMU's first field goal. The Broncos responded with two passing touchdowns and led at the half, 23–7. The Bobcats opened the third quarter with a touchdown inside the first two minutes to bring Ohio within 10 points as the extra point was no good. Broncos' kicker Butch Hampton responded with just under 3:30 left in the quarter with his fourth field goal of the game. The Bobcats cut the lead to six points with just over a minute left in the third quarter as Windham connected with Papi White for a 31-yard touchdown pass and the third quarter ended with Western Michigan leading 26–20. Ohio cut the Broncos' lead to three with 7:14 left in the final quarter after Louie Zervos kicked his first field goal of the game, from 37 yards. WMU kicker Butch Hampton improved to five-for-five on field goals on the game with 1:24 left in the fourth quarter to extend Western Michigan's lead to six. Ohio's would-be game-winning drive was abruptly cut short when Windham's pass was intercepted over the middle by Robert Spillane with 0:51 left in the game. Western Michigan took over and ran out the clock to with the MAC Championship.

=== Scoring summary ===
Scoring summary

Quarter	Time	Drive			Team	Scoring information	Score	
Quarter	Time	Plays	Yards	TOP	Team	Scoring information	WMU	OHIO
1	6:40	6	28	2:40	WMU	42-yard field goal by Butch Hampton	3	0
1	5:31	4	7	1:02	WMU	27-yard field goal by Butch Hampton	6	0
2	9:42	17	77	9:03	WMU	21-yard field goal by Butch Hampton	9	0
2	8:08	4	73	1:29	OHIO	Jordan Reid 8-yard touchdown reception from Greg Windham, Louie Zervos kick good	9	7
2	7:49	1	70	0:19	WMU	Corey Davis 70-yard touchdown reception from Zach Terrell, Butch Hampton kick good	16	7
2	0:36	5	54	0:55	WMU	Carrington Thompson 8-yard touchdown reception from Zach Terrell, Butch Hampton kick good	23	7
3	13:55	1	5	0:06	OHIO	Greg Windham 5-yard touchdown reception from Greg Windham, Louie Zervos kick no good	23	13
3	3:28	4	5	1:32	WMU	33-yard field goal by Butch Hampton	26	13
3	1:09	5	81	2:19	OHIO	Papi White 31-yard touchdown reception from Greg Windham, Louie Zervos kick good	26	20
4	7:14	13	48	5:05	OHIO	37-yard field goal by Louie Zervos	26	23
4	1:24	12	56	5:50	WMU	33-yard field goal by Butch Hampton	29	23
"TOP" = time of possession. For other American football terms, see Glossary of American football.							29	23

Western Michigan vs Ohio

	1	2	3	4	Total
• No. 17 Western Michigan	6	17	3	3	29
Ohio	0	7	13	3	23

- Date: December 2, 2016
- Location:
  Ford Field
  Detroit, MI
- Game start: 6:00 pm
- Game attendance: 45,615
- Game weather: Indoors
- TV announcers (ESPN2): Adam Amin (Play-by-Play), Mack Brown (Analyst)

=== Statistics ===
Statistics	WMU	OHIO
First downs	21	14
Third down efficiency	4–15	5–12
Rushes–yards	44–114	22–37
Passing yards	301	214
Passing: Comp–Att–Int	20–32–2	14–31–1
Time of possession	37:45	22:15

Category	Team	Player	Statistics
Passing	WMU	Zach Terrell (QB)	20/32, 301 yds, 2 TD, 2 INT
Passing	OHIO	Greg Windham (QB)	14/30, 214 yds, 3 TD, 1 INT
Rushing	WMU	Jamauri Bogan (RB)	26 att, 73 yds
Rushing	OHIO	Greg Windham (QB)	3 att, 14 yds
Receiving	WMU	Corey Davis (WR)	9 rec, 155 yds, 1 TD
Receiving	OHIO	Papi White (WR)	2 rec, 98 yds, 1 TD
