= Ulysees Gilbert =

American football player (born 1997)

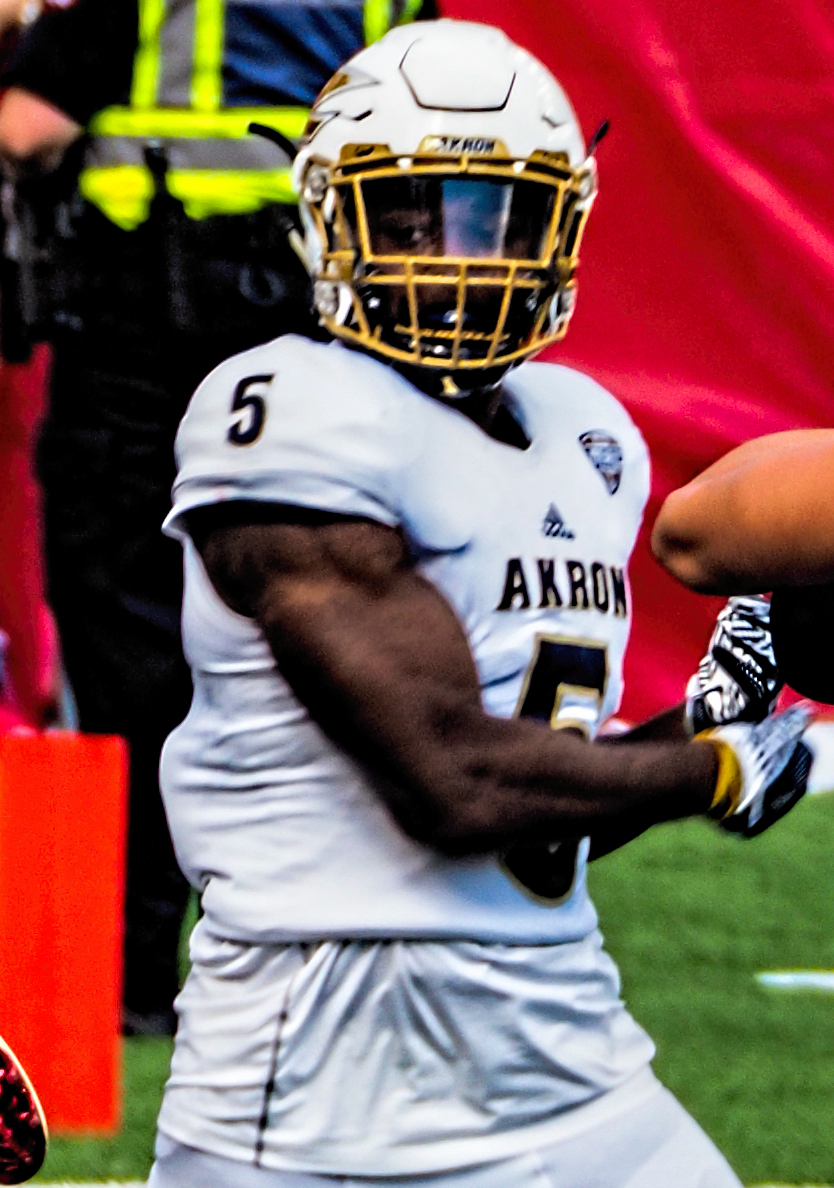
- Gilbert with the Akron Zips in 2016

No. 54, 57
- Position: Linebacker

Personal information
- Born: August 9, 1997 (age 29); Ocala, Florida, U.S.
- Listed height: 6 ft 0 in (1.83 m)
- Listed weight: 230 lb (104 kg)

Career information
- High school: Trinity Catholic (Ocala)
- College: Akron (2015–2018)
- NFL draft: 2019: 6th round, 207th overall pick

Career history
- Pittsburgh Steelers (2019–2021); Tampa Bay Buccaneers (2022)

Awards and highlights
- 2× First-team All-MAC (2016, 2017); Second-team All-MAC (2018)

Career NFL statistics
- Total tackles: 29
- Total touchdowns: 1
- Stats at Pro Football Reference

Ulysees Gilbert III (born August 9, 1997) is an American former professional football player who was a linebacker in the National Football League (NFL). He played college football for the Akron Zips and was selected by the Pittsburgh Steelers in the sixth round of the 2019 NFL draft.

== Professional career ==
Pre-draft measurables
Height	Weight	Arm length	Hand span	40-yard dash	10-yard split	20-yard split	20-yard shuttle	Three-cone drill	Vertical jump	Broad jump	Bench press
6 ft 0 1/8 in (1.83 m)	224 lb (102 kg)	31 3/4 in (0.81 m)	9 3/4 in (0.25 m)	4.51 s	1.51 s	2.58 s	4.43 s	7.03 s	39.5 in (1.00 m)	10 ft 6 in (3.20 m)	20 reps
All values from Pro Day

=== Pittsburgh Steelers ===
Gilbert was selected by the Pittsburgh Steelers in the sixth round (207th overall) of the 2019 NFL draft. The Steelers originally acquired the selection in an offseason trade that sent Marcus Gilbert to the Arizona Cardinals. On November 5, 2019, the Steelers placed Gilbert on injured reserve with a back injury.

On November 4, 2020, Gilbert was placed on injured reserve with another back injury. He was activated on December 12, 2020. He was again placed on injured reserve on December 25, 2020.

During week 1 of the 2021 season against the Buffalo Bills, Gilbert recovered a punt blocked by teammate Miles Killebrew and returned it nine yards for a Steelers touchdown. The Steelers won 23–16.

He was waived/injured on August 10, 2022, and was placed on injured reserve the next day. He was waived with an injury settlement on August 19, 2022.

=== Tampa Bay Buccaneers ===
On October 11, 2022, Gilbert was signed to the practice squad of the Tampa Bay Buccaneers. He was promoted to the active roster on January 10, 2023. Gilbert was waived by the Buccaneers on August 28.
