= Quentin Poling =

American football player (born 1994)

No. 51
- Position: Linebacker

Personal information
- Born: August 17, 1994 (age 32); Gomer, Ohio, U.S.
- Listed height: 6 ft 1 in (1.85 m)
- Listed weight: 235 lb (107 kg)

Career information
- High school: Elida (OH)
- College: Ohio
- NFL draft: 2018: 7th round, 227th overall pick

Career history
- Miami Dolphins (2018–2019)*; Oakland Raiders (2019); Atlanta Falcons (2019)*; Las Vegas Raiders (2020)*; Minnesota Vikings (2020)*; New Orleans Saints (2021)*; Birmingham Stallions (2022–2023)
- * Offseason or practice squad member only

Awards and highlights
- 2× USFL champion (2022, 2023); 2× First-team All-MAC (2016, 2017)
- Stats at Pro Football Reference

Quentin Poling (born August 17, 1994) is an American former professional football linebacker. He played college football at Ohio.

== Early life ==
Poling attended Elida High School in Elida, Ohio.

== College career ==
Poling played college football at Ohio University. He was a team captain and a first-team All-Mid-American Conference selection. In his Senior year, Poling became Ohio University's all-time leader in both solo tackles (219) and tackles for loss (45).

== Professional career ==
=== Miami Dolphins ===
Poling was drafted by the Miami Dolphins in the seventh round, 227th overall, of the 2018 NFL draft. He was waived on September 1, 2018, and was signed to the practice squad the next day. He signed a reserve/future contract with the Dolphins on January 1, 2019. He was waived/injured by the during final roster cuts on August 31, 2019, and reverted to the team's injured reserve list after clearing waivers on September 1. He was waived from injured reserve with an injury settlement on September 4.

=== Oakland Raiders ===
On September 25, 2019, Poling was signed to the Oakland Raiders practice squad. He was promoted to the active roster on November 7, 2019, but was waived two days later and re-signed to the practice squad. He was released on December 4, 2019.

=== Atlanta Falcons ===
On December 10, 2019, Poling was signed to the Atlanta Falcons practice squad. His practice squad contract with the team expired on January 6, 2020.

=== Las Vegas Raiders ===
On February 6, 2020, Poling was signed by the Las Vegas Raiders. He was waived on May 5, 2020.

=== Minnesota Vikings ===
Poling was signed by the Minnesota Vikings on August 8, 2020. He was waived/injured on August 17, 2020, and subsequently reverted to the team's injured reserve list the next day. He was waived on September 2, 2020.

=== New Orleans Saints ===
On May 16, 2021, Poling signed with the New Orleans Saints. He was waived/injured on August 13, 2021, and placed on injured reserve. He was waived on August 21.

=== Birmingham Stallions ===
Poling signed with the Birmingham Stallions of the United States Football League on May 20, 2022, and was subsequently moved to the inactive roster. He was placed on the team's suspended list on June 13, 2023. He became a free agent after the 2023 season.
