= Joe Ostman =

American football player (born 1995)

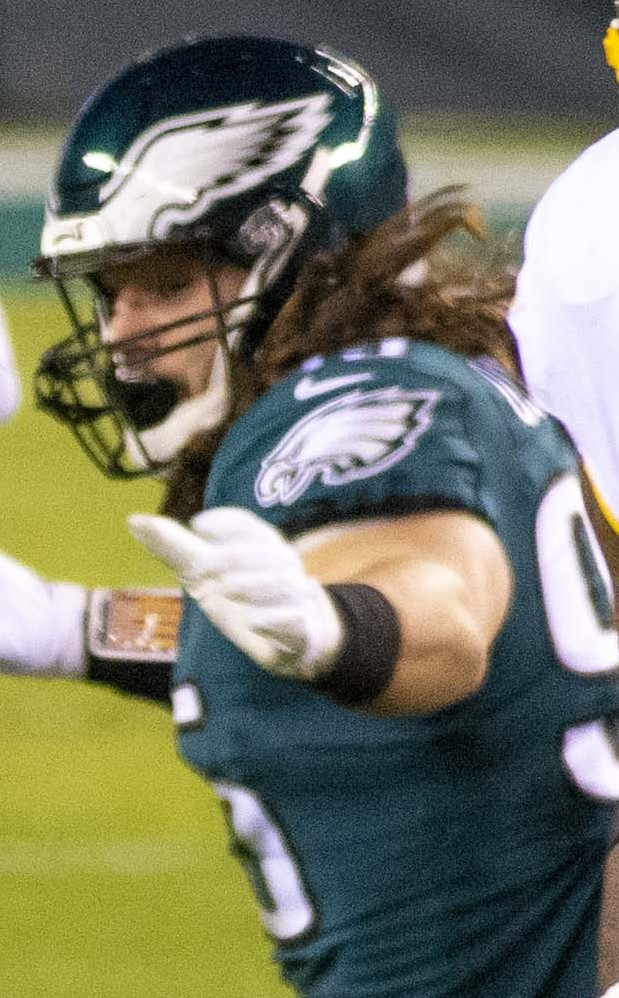
- Ostman with the Philadelphia Eagles in 2021

Profile
- Position: Defensive end

Personal information
- Born: July 12, 1995 (age 31); St. Ignace, Michigan, U.S.
- Listed height: 6 ft 3 in (1.91 m)
- Listed weight: 259 lb (117 kg)

Career information
- High school: St. Ignace LaSalle (St. Ignace)
- College: Central Michigan
- NFL draft: 2017: undrafted

Career history
- Philadelphia Eagles (2018–2021)

Awards and highlights
- First-team All-MAC (2017); Second-team All-MAC (2016); Third-team All-Mid American Conference (2014)
- Stats at Pro Football Reference

Joe Ostman (born July 12, 1995) is an American former professional football player who was a defensive end in the National Football League (NFL). He played college football for the Central Michigan Chippewas. He signed with the Philadelphia Eagles as an undrafted free agent in 2018.

== Professional career ==
After going undrafted when coming out of Central Michigan, Ostman signed with the Philadelphia Eagles on May 11, 2018. He was waived on September 1, and was re-signed to the practice squad the next day.

After spending the entire 2018 season on the Eagles' practice squad, Ostman signed a reserve/future contract with the team on January 14, 2019. He tore his anterior cruciate ligament and was placed on injured reserve on August 6.

Ostman was waived by the Eagles during final roster cuts on September 5, 2020, and was re-signed to the practice squad the following day. He was elevated to the active roster on November 21, December 26, and January 2, 2021, for the team's Weeks 11, 16, and 17 games against the Cleveland Browns, Dallas Cowboys, and Washington Football Team, and reverted to the practice squad after each game. He made his NFL debut against the Browns. He signed a reserve/future contract with the Eagles on January 4, 2021.

On August 23, 2021, Ostman was waived/injured by the Eagles and placed on injured reserve.

On May 23, 2022, Ostman was released.
