= Mason Schreck =

American football player (born 1993)

No. 86
- Position: Tight end

Personal information
- Born: November 4, 1993 (age 33); Medina, Ohio, U.S.
- Listed height: 6 ft 5 in (1.96 m)
- Listed weight: 252 lb (114 kg)

Career information
- High school: Medina
- College: Buffalo
- NFL draft: 2017: 7th round, 251st overall pick

Career history
- Cincinnati Bengals (2017–2021); Houston Texans (2022)

Awards and highlights
- Second-team All-MAC (2016)

Career NFL statistics
- Receptions: 2
- Receiving yards: 6
- Stats at Pro Football Reference

Mason Schreck (born November 4, 1993) is an American former professional football player who was a tight end in the National Football League (NFL). He played college football for the Buffalo Bulls before being drafted by the Cincinnati Bengals in the seventh round of the 2017 NFL draft.

== Early life ==
Schreck attended Medina High School in Medina, Ohio where he played both basketball and football. Schreck played primarily as a quarterback at Medina and threw for 667 yards and eight touchdowns as a junior. He was recruited by college football programs including Ohio State, Iowa, South Florida, Cincinnati, North Carolina State, Northwestern and Bowling Green but ultimately only received offers from Toledo and Buffalo.

== College career ==
In 2012 Schreck signed a letter of intent to play at Buffalo where Jeff Quinn recruited him to play tight end. After redshirting as a freshman at the University at Buffalo in 2012, Schreck caught a total of six touchdown passes from Joe Licata and Tyree Jackson between 2013 and 2016. As a redshirt senior in 2016, he set a school record for a tight end with 651 receiving yards and was named to the All-Mid-American Conference Second-team.

== Professional career ==
Pre-draft measurables
Height	Weight	Arm length	Hand span	40-yard dash	10-yard split	20-yard split	20-yard shuttle	Three-cone drill	Vertical jump	Broad jump	Bench press
6 ft 4 1/2 in (1.94 m)	253 lb (115 kg)	33 1/8 in (0.84 m)	9 7/8 in (0.25 m)	4.76 s	1.59 s	2.74 s	4.27 s	7.36 s	34.5 in (0.88 m)	9 ft 10 in (3.00 m)	19 reps
All values from Pro Day

=== Cincinnati Bengals ===
Schreck was selected in the seventh round (251st overall) by the Cincinnati Bengals in the 2017 NFL draft. He was signed to a four-year, $2.46 million contract. He was placed on injured reserve on September 2, 2017.

Schreck played in six games in 2018 before being placed on injured reserve on October 23, 2018 with a knee injury.

Schreck was waived during final roster cuts on August 31, 2019 and was signed to the practice squad the next day. He was promoted to the active roster on November 30, 2019. He appeared in two games in the 2019 season; he was on the field for 22 snaps against the New York Jets on December 1 and one snap against the New England Patriots two weeks later.

On September 5, 2020, Schreck was waived by the Bengals. He was signed to the practice squad the following day. He was promoted to the active roster on September 18. Two weeks later, Schreck recorded the first tackle of his NFL career when he brought down Pittsburgh Steelers punt returner Ray-Ray McCloud after a return of only eight yards.

On August 31, 2021, Schreck was waived by the Bengals and re-signed to the practice squad the next day.

=== Houston Texans ===
On June 11, 2022, Schreck signed with the Houston Texans. He was released on August 30, and signed to the practice squad the next day. Schreck made his Texans debut in the fourth week of the season at NRG Stadium and, in his sixth professional season, caught the first pass of his career on a short throw from Davis Mills; he was tackled by Derwin James before being able to gain any ground. The following week, he was an offensive starter for just the second time in his career and was on the field for a career high 24 offensive plays. He also tallied the first receiving yards of his career, picking up six yards on a pass from Mills before being brought down by Foyesade Oluokun of the Jacksonville Jaguars. The Texans returned him to their practice squad the following day. He signed a reserve/future contract on January 10, 2023.

On August 29, 2023, Schreck was waived by the Texans.
