= Michael Roberts (American football) =

American football player (born 1994)

No. 80, 89
- Position: Tight end

Personal information
- Born: May 7, 1994 (age 32); Cleveland, Ohio, U.S.
- Listed height: 6 ft 5 in (1.96 m)
- Listed weight: 265 lb (120 kg)

Career information
- High school: Benedictine (Cleveland)
- College: Toledo
- NFL draft: 2017: 4th round, 127th overall pick

Career history
- Detroit Lions (2017–2018); Green Bay Packers (2019)*; Miami Dolphins (2020)*
- * Offseason or practice squad member only

Awards and highlights
- First-team All-American (2016); First-team All-MAC (2016)

Career NFL statistics
- Receptions: 13
- Receiving yards: 146
- Receiving touchdowns: 3
- Stats at Pro Football Reference

Michael Lorenzo Roberts (born May 7, 1994) is an American former professional football player who was a tight end in the National Football League (NFL). He played college football for the Toledo Rockets, earning All-American honors in 2016.

== Professional career ==
Pre-draft measurables
Height	Weight	Arm length	Hand span	40-yard dash	20-yard shuttle	Three-cone drill	Vertical jump	Broad jump
6 ft 4 3/8 in (1.94 m)	270 lb (122 kg)	33 in (0.84 m)	11 1/2 in (0.29 m)	4.86 s	4.51 s	7.05 s	30.0 in (0.76 m)	9 ft 2 in (2.79 m)
All values from NFL Combine

=== Detroit Lions ===
The Detroit Lions selected Roberts in the fourth round (127th overall) of the 2017 NFL draft. On May 12, 2017, the Lions signed him to a four-year, $3.00 million contract with a signing bonus of $603,136. In Week 4, against the Minnesota Vikings, he recorded his first career catch, a 15-yard reception.

In 2018, Roberts played in eight games with two starts, recording nine catches for 100 yards and three touchdowns. He was placed on injured reserve on December 11, 2018 with a shoulder injury.

On June 13, 2019, the Lions agreed to trade Roberts to the New England Patriots for a 2020 conditional seventh-round pick. Two days later, the trade was voided before becoming official, and Roberts was subsequently waived by the Lions.

=== Green Bay Packers ===
On June 17, 2019, Roberts was claimed off waivers by the Green Bay Packers, but was waived two days later after failing his physical.

=== Miami Dolphins ===
On February 19, 2020, Roberts was signed by the Miami Dolphins. He was waived with a non-football injury designation on July 27, 2020.
