= 2016 Dollar General Bowl =

- 18th Dollar General Bowl
Ohio Bobcats	Troy Trojans
(8–5)	(9–3)
MAC	Sun Belt
23	28
Head coach: Frank Solich	Head coach: Neal Brown
	1	2	3	4	Total
Ohio	7	10	3	3	23
Troy	14	7	7	0	28
- Date: December 23, 2016
- Season: 2016
- Stadium: Ladd–Peebles Stadium
- Location: Mobile, Alabama
- MVP: Troy LB Justin Lucas
- Favorite: Troy by 3.5
- Referee: Tra Blake (C-USA)
- Attendance: 32,377
- Payout: US$750,000

United States TV coverage
- Network: ESPN
- Announcers: Clay Matvick, Dusty Dvoracek, Dr. Jerry Punch

The 2016 Dollar General Bowl was a postseason college football bowl game that was played at Ladd–Peebles Stadium in Mobile, Alabama on December 23, 2016. The 18th edition of the Dollar General Bowl (previously called the GoDaddy Bowl) featured the Ohio Bobcats of the Mid-American Conference versus the Troy Trojans of the Sun Belt Conference.

== Teams ==
The game featured the Ohio Bobcats against the Troy Trojans.

This was the second meeting between the schools; the first meeting was in the 2010 New Orleans Bowl, where the Trojans defeated the Bobcats by a score of 48–21. Coincidentally, that had been Troy's most recent bowl appearance prior to this game.

== Game summary ==
=== Scoring summary ===
Scoring summary

Quarter	Time	Drive			Team	Scoring information	Score	
Quarter	Time	Plays	Yards	TOP	Team	Scoring information	Ohio	Troy
1	13:34	2	48	0:19	Troy	Jordan Chunn 1-yard touchdown run, Ryan Kay kick good	0	7
1	8:19	7	99	2:58	Ohio	Papi White 44-yard touchdown reception from Greg Windham, Louie Zervos kick good	7	7
1	1:14	11	65	4:29	Troy	Jordan Chunn 3-yard touchdown run, Ryan Kay kick good	7	14
2	13:20	10	58	2:54	Ohio	33-yard field goal by Louie Zervos	10	14
2	4:52	5	18	2:03	Troy	Emanuel Thompson 11-yard touchdown reception from Brandon Silvers, Ryan Kay kick good	10	21
2	0:59	11	77	3:53	Ohio	Jordan Reid 5-yard touchdown reception from Greg Windham, Louie Zervos kick good	17	21
3	5:47	1	4	0:04	Troy	Jordan Chunn 4-yard touchdown run, Ryan Kay kick good	17	28
3	3:28	9	21	2:19	Ohio	47-yard field goal by Louie Zervos	20	28
4	4:01	8	36	3:54	Ohio	37-yard field goal by Louie Zervos	23	28
"TOP" = time of possession. For other American football terms, see Glossary of American football.							23	28

=== Statistics ===
Statistics	Ohio	Troy
First downs	23	17
Third down efficiency	5–12	8–17
Rushes-yards	30–78 (2.6)	31–87 (2.8)
Passing yards	315	235
Passing, Comp-Att-Int	23–47–4	24–41–2
Time of Possession	30:40	29:20

Team	Category	Player	Statistics
Ohio	Passing	Greg Windham	23/47, 315 yds, 2 TD, 4 INT
Ohio	Rushing	Greg Windham	10 car, 24 yds
Ohio	Receiving	Jordan Reid	12 rec, 162 yds, 1 TD
Troy	Passing	Brandon Silvers	24/41, 235 yds, 1 TD, 2 INT
Troy	Rushing	Jordan Chunn	20 car, 56 yds, 3 TD
Troy	Receiving	Emanuel Thompson	8 rec, 83 yds, 1 TD
