= 2016 St. Petersburg Bowl =

- 9th St. Petersburg Bowl
Miami RedHawks	Mississippi State Bulldogs
(6–6)	(5–7)
MAC	SEC
16	17
Head coach: Chuck Martin	Head coach: Dan Mullen
	1	2	3	4	Total
Miami	3	6	7	0	16
Mississippi State	0	7	7	3	17
- Date: December 26, 2016
- Season: 2016
- Stadium: Tropicana Field
- Location: St. Petersburg, Florida
- MVP: Nick Fitzgerald
- Favorite: Mississippi State by 12
- Referee: Jay Edwards (C-USA)
- Attendance: 15,717
- Payout: US$537,500

United States TV coverage
- Network: ESPN/ESPN Radio
- Announcers: Dave LaMont, Rene Ingoglia, Chris Doering (TV); Kevin Winter, Trevor Matich (Radio)

The 2016 St. Petersburg Bowl was a post-season American college football bowl game that was played on December 26, 2016 at Tropicana Field in St. Petersburg, Florida, United States. The ninth edition of the St. Petersburg Bowl featured the Miami Redhawks from the Mid-American Conference against the Mississippi State Bulldogs from the Southeastern Conference.

== Team selections ==
On December 4, 2016, it was announced that the game would feature the Miami Redhawks against the Mississippi State Bulldogs after both accepted invitations Sunday, marking the first time each team would meet.

=== Miami (OH) ===
After finishing their regular season with a 6–6 record, the Miami Redhawks appeared in their eleventh bowl game, and the first since the 2011 GoDaddy.com Bowl game against Middle Tennessee. Miami opened the year with a six-game losing streak, and then finished with a six-game winning streak making them the first team to finish a regular season after they lost the first six consecutive games.

=== Mississippi State ===
After finishing their regular season with a 5–7 record, Mississippi State appeared in their seventh straight bowl game. Mississippi State opened the year with 2 wins and 2 losses, losing to South Alabama and Louisiana State and winning against South Carolina and Massachusetts. Mississippi State then lost 3 consecutive games against Auburn, Brigham Young, and Kentucky before winning 2 games against Samford and Texas A&M. Lastly losing to Alabama and Arkansas before winning against Ole Miss in the Egg Bowl.

== Game summary ==
=== Scoring summary ===
Scoring summary

Quarter	Time	Drive			Team	Scoring information	Score	
Quarter	Time	Plays	Yards	TOP	Team	Scoring information	Miami	MSU
1	10:07	9	58	4:53	Miami	18-yard field goal by Nick Dowd	3	0
2	8:36	8	66	4:54	Miami	James Gardner 6-yard touchdown reception from Gus Ragland, Nick Dowd kick no good (blocked)	9	0
2	0:22	9	64	2:53	MSU	Nick Fitzgerald 2-yard touchdown run, Westin Graves kick good	9	7
3	8:11	8	85	4:24	Miami	Ryan Smith 1-yard touchdown reception from Gus Ragland, Nick Dowd kick good	16	7
3	4:15	9	82	3:50	MSU	Nick Fitzgerald 44-yard touchdown run, Westin Graves kick good	16	14
4	12:03	7	51	2:46	MSU	36-yard field goal by Westin Graves	16	17
"TOP" = time of possession. For other American football terms, see Glossary of American football.							16	17

=== Statistics ===
Statistics	Miami	MSU
First downs	24	17
Third down efficiency	3–9	7–14
Total plays-yards	66–433	60–335
Rushes-yards	35–170 (4.9)	33–209 (6.3)
Passing yards	263	126
Passing, Comp-Att-Int	22–31–1	13–27–0
Time of Possession	35:08	24:52
