= JoJo Natson =

American football player (born 1994)

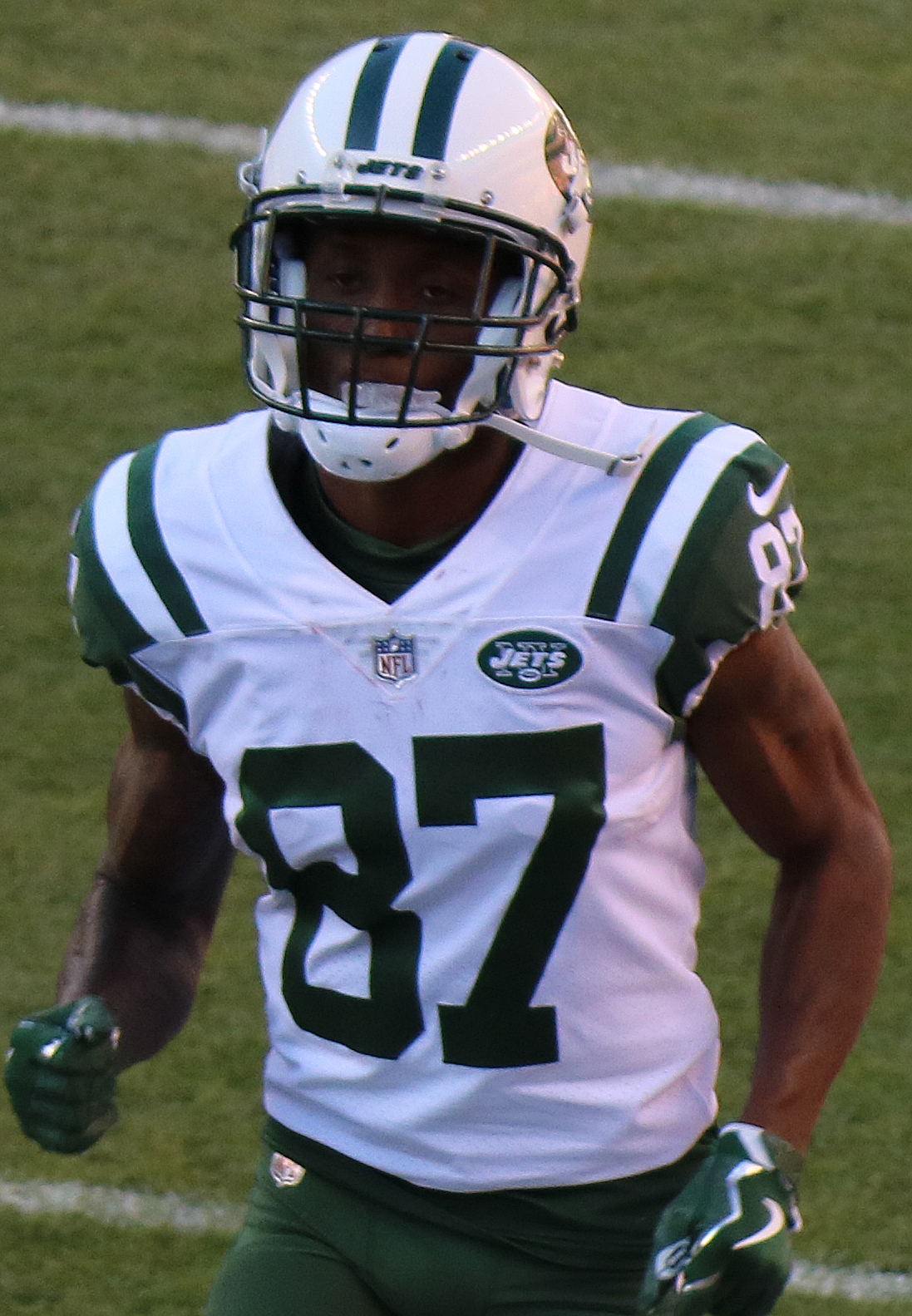
- Natson with the New York Jets in 2017

No. 87, 19
- Positions: Wide receiver, return specialist

Personal information
- Born: February 1, 1994 (age 32); Fort Lauderdale, Florida, U.S.
- Listed height: 5 ft 7 in (1.70 m)
- Listed weight: 153 lb (69 kg)

Career information
- High school: Boyd H. Anderson (Lauderdale Lakes, Florida)
- College: Utah State (2012-2014); Akron (2015-2016)
- NFL draft: 2017: undrafted

Career history
- Indianapolis Colts (2017)*; New York Jets (2017); Los Angeles Rams (2018–2019); Cleveland Browns (2020–2021)
- * Offseason or practice squad member only

Awards and highlights
- First-team All-MAC (2016) (punt returner); Second-team All-MAC (2016) (wide receiver); First-team All-MWC (2014)

Career NFL statistics
- Receptions: 2
- Receiving yards: 18
- Return yards: 1,367
- Stats at Pro Football Reference

Bruce "JoJo" Natson Jr. (born February 1, 1994) is an American former professional football player who was a wide receiver and return specialist in the National Football League (NFL). He played college football at Utah State and Akron.

== Early life ==
Natson was born on February 1, 1994, in Fort Lauderdale, Florida. He attended Boyd H. Anderson High School in Lauderdale Lakes, Florida.

== College career ==
Natson played for three seasons at Utah State where he is tied for first all-time in both Utah State and Mountain West history with four punt returns for touchdowns. After multiple violations of team rules, Natson was dismissed from the Utah State football team. Natson transferred to Akron in 2015. He was forced to sit out the 2015 season due to NCAA transfer rules. In 2016, he played in 12 games with 11 starts, recording 59 receptions for 837 yards and 10 touchdowns, along with 16 punt returns for 261 yards and two touchdowns. He was named first-team All-MAC as a punt returner, and second-team All-MAC as a wide receiver.

== Professional career ==
Pre-draft measurables
Height	Weight	Arm length	Hand span	40-yard dash	10-yard split	20-yard split	20-yard shuttle	Three-cone drill	Vertical jump	Broad jump	Bench press
5 ft 6 3/4 in (1.70 m)	159 lb (72 kg)	29 1/8 in (0.74 m)	8 in (0.20 m)	4.46 s	1.53 s	2.58 s	4.19 s	7.20 s	34.0 in (0.86 m)	10 ft 2 in (3.10 m)	16 reps
All values from Pro Day

=== Indianapolis Colts ===
Natson was signed by the Indianapolis Colts as an undrafted free agent on May 4, 2017. He was waived by the Colts on September 2.

=== New York Jets ===
On September 4, 2017, Natson was signed to the practice squad of the New York Jets. He was promoted to the active roster on November 11.

Natson was waived by the Jets on April 27, 2018.

=== Los Angeles Rams ===
On July 24, 2018, Natson signed with the Los Angeles Rams. He was waived by Los Angeles on August 31. On September 12, Natson re-signed with the Rams after Pharoh Cooper was placed on injured reserve with an ankle injury.

On December 3, 2019, Natson was again placed on injured reserve with a hamstring injury, ending his season. On March 10, 2020, Natson was waived by the Rams.

=== Cleveland Browns ===
On March 24, 2020, Natson signed a one-year, $1 million contract with the Cleveland Browns. He was placed on injured reserve on September 28, 2020, after suffering a torn ACL in Week 3.

On March 19, 2021, Natson re-signed with the Browns. The Browns terminated Natson's contract on August 31, 2021. Natson was re-signed to the Browns' practice squad on September 1, 2021. Natson was elevated to the Browns' active roster on November 13, 2021, and reverted to the practice squad the following day. Natson was elevated to the active roster again on December 11, 2021. Natson was waived by the Browns on December 28, 2021.

== Career statistics ==
=== NFL ===
Regular season statistics
Year	Team	Games		Receiving					Kickoff return					Punt return					Fumbles	
Year	Team	G	GS	Rec	Yds	Avg	Lng	TD	Ret	Yds	Avg	Lng	TD	Ret	Yds	Avg	Lng	TD	FUM	Lost
2017	NYJ	7	0	2	18	9.0	19	0	16	325	20.3	32	0	16	38	2.4	17	0	1	0
2018	LAR	13	0	--	–	0.0	–	–	6	108	18.0	24	0	26	280	10.8	60	0	2	1
2019	LAR	12	0	--	–	0.0	–	–	13	289	22.2	30	0	19	149	7.8	35	0	0	0
Total		32	0	2	18	9.0	19	0	35	722	20.6	32	0	61	467	7.7	60	0	3	1

Postseason statistics
Year	Team	Games		Receiving					Kickoff return					Punt return					Fumbles	
Year	Team	G	GS	Rec	Yds	Avg	Lng	TD	Ret	Yds	Avg	Lng	TD	Ret	Yds	Avg	Lng	TD	FUM	Lost
2018	LAR	3	0	–	–	0.0	–	–	2	44	22.0	27	0	5	24	4.8	12	0	0	0
Total		3	0	0	0	0.0	0	0	2	44	22.0	27	0	5	24	4.8	12	0	0	0

=== College ===
Team	Season	Rec	Yds	TD	Rush	Yds	TDs	PR	Yds	TDs
Utah State	2012	17	132	1	2	15	0	0	0	0
Utah State	2013	59	395	2	28	98	3	31	351	2
Utah State	2014	51	504	3	25	292	2	25	292	2
Akron	2016	59	837	10	4	6	0	16	261	2
Career totals		186	1,868	15	84	617	6	72	904	6
