= 2016 Wisconsin Badgers football team =

American college football season

2016 Wisconsin Badgers football

Big Ten West Division champion Cotton Bowl Classic champion

Big Ten Championship Game, L 31–38 vs. Penn State

Cotton Bowl Classic, W 24–16 vs. Western Michigan
- Conference: Big Ten Conference
- West Division

Ranking
- Coaches: No. 9
- AP: No. 9
- Record: 11–3 (7–2 Big Ten)
- Head coach: Paul Chryst (2nd season)
- Offensive coordinator: Joe Rudolph (2nd season)
- Offensive scheme: Pro-style
- Defensive coordinator: Justin Wilcox (1st season)
- Base defense: 3–4
- MVP: Leo Musso
- Captains: Vince Biegel; Dare Ogunbowale
- Home stadium: Camp Randall Stadium

Uniform
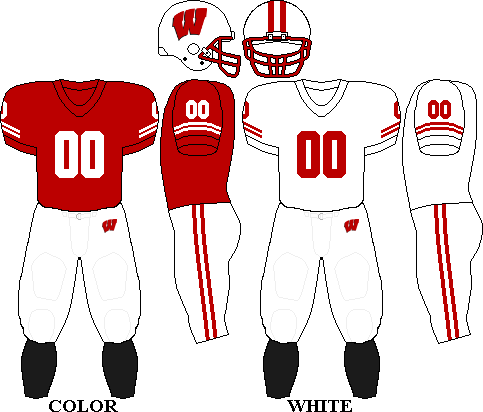

2016 Big Ten Conference football standings
	Conf.			Overall
Team	W		L	W		L
East Division
No. 7 Penn State xy$	8	–	1	11	–	3
No. 6 Ohio State x^	8	–	1	11	–	2
No. 10 Michigan	7	–	2	10	–	3
Indiana	4	–	5	6	–	7
Maryland	3	–	6	6	–	7
Michigan State	1	–	8	3	–	9
Rutgers	0	–	9	2	–	10
West Division
No. 9 Wisconsin xy	7	–	2	11	–	3
Iowa	6	–	3	8	–	5
Nebraska	6	–	3	9	–	4
Minnesota	5	–	4	9	–	4
Northwestern	5	–	4	7	–	6
Illinois	2	–	7	3	–	9
Purdue	1	–	8	3	–	9
Championship: Penn State 38, Wisconsin 31
^ – College Football Playoff participant; $ – Conference champion; x – Division champion/co-champions; y – Championship game participant; Rankings from AP Poll

The 2016 Wisconsin Badgers football team represented the University of Wisconsin–Madison in the 2016 NCAA Division I FBS football season. The Badgers, led by second-year head coach Paul Chryst, were members of the West Division of the Big Ten Conference and played their home games at Camp Randall Stadium in Madison, Wisconsin.

== Watchlists and preseason awards ==
- Michael Deiter (C)

Rimington Trophy

- Jack Cichy (OLB)

Lott IMPACT Trophy

- Corey Clement (RB)

Maxwell Award, Doak Walker Award

- Vince Biegel (OLB)

Bednarik Award, Nagurski Award, Butkus Award, Allstate AFCA Good Works Team

- Dan Voltz (G)

Outland Trophy

== Schedule ==
Wisconsin announced its 2016 football schedule on July 11, 2013. The 2016 schedule consists of 6 home, 5 away, and 1 neutral site game in the regular season. The Badgers will host Big Ten foes Illinois, Minnesota, Nebraska, and Ohio State, and will travel to Iowa, Michigan, Michigan State, Northwestern, and Purdue.

The team's three non–conference games are against the Akron Zips from the Mid-American Conference (MAC), Georgia State Panthers from the Sun Belt Conference, and the LSU Tigers from the Southeastern Conference (SEC).

The Associated Press and Coaches' preseason top 25 polls were released in August and for the first time since 2009 the Badgers were unranked in both polls. Meanwhile, the first five of their Power 5 opponents were all ranked 17th or higher in the preseason polls with #5 LSU, #6 Ohio State, #7 Michigan, #12 Michigan State and #17 Iowa.

Date	Time	Opponent	Rank	Site	TV	Result	Attendance
September 3	2:30 p.m.	vs. No. 5 LSU*		Lambeau Field; Green Bay, WI (College GameDay)	ABC	W 16–14	77,823
September 10	2:30 p.m.	Akron*	No. 10	Camp Randall Stadium; Madison, WI	BTN	W 54–10	77,331
September 17	11:00 a.m.	Georgia State*	No. 9	Camp Randall Stadium; Madison, WI	BTN	W 23–17	79,883
September 24	11:00 a.m.	at No. 8 Michigan State	No. 11	Spartan Stadium; East Lansing, MI	BTN	W 30–6	75,505
October 1	3:30 p.m.	at No. 4 Michigan	No. 8	Michigan Stadium; Ann Arbor, MI	ABC	L 7–14	111,846
October 15	7:00 p.m.	No. 2 Ohio State	No. 8	Camp Randall Stadium; Madison, WI (College GameDay)	ABC	L 23–30 ^{OT}	81,541
October 22	11:00 a.m.	at Iowa	No. 10	Kinnick Stadium; Iowa City, IA (rivalry)	ESPN	W 17–9	70,585
October 29	6:00 p.m.	No. 7 Nebraska	No. 11	Camp Randall Stadium; Madison, WI (rivalry)	ESPN	W 23–17 ^{OT}	80,833
November 5	11:00 a.m.	at Northwestern	No. 8	Ryan Field; Evanston, IL	ABC	W 21–7	42,016
November 12	2:30 p.m.	Illinois^{†}	No. 7	Camp Randall Stadium; Madison, WI	ESPN2	W 48–3	79,340
November 19	11:00 a.m.	at Purdue	No. 6	Ross–Ade Stadium; West Lafayette, IN	ABC	W 49–20	30,465
November 26	2:30 p.m.	Minnesota	No. 5	Camp Randall Stadium; Madison, WI (rivalry)	BTN	W 31–17	77,216
December 3	7:30 p.m.	vs. No. 8 Penn State	No. 6	Lucas Oil Stadium; Indianapolis, IN (Big Ten Championship) (College GameDay)	FOX	L 31–38	65,018
January 2, 2017	12:00 p.m.	vs. No. 12 Western Michigan*	No. 8	AT&T Stadium; Arlington, TX (Cotton Bowl Classic)	ESPN	W 24–16	59,615
*Non-conference game; ^{†}Homecoming; Rankings from AP Poll released prior to game; All times are in Central time

Schedule source:

== Rankings ==
Ranking movements Legend: ██ Increase in ranking ██ Decrease in ranking RV = Received votes
	Week															
Poll	Pre	1	2	3	4	5	6	7	8	9	10	11	12	13	14	Final
AP	RV	10	9	11	8	11	8	10	11	8	7	6	5	6	8	9
Coaches	RV	16	12	10	8	13	10	10	10	8	7	6	6	5	8	9
CFP	Not released									8	7	7	6	6	8	Not released

== Game summaries ==
=== vs. #5 LSU ===
#5 LSU Tigers (0–0) vs. Wisconsin Badgers (0–0)

Quarter	1	2	3	4	Total
#5 LSU	0	0	14	0	14
Wisconsin	0	6	7	3	16

at Lambeau Field, Green Bay, Wisconsin

- Date: September 3, 2016
- Game time: 2:40 p.m.
- Game weather: Mostly sunny, 75 °F (24 °C)
- Game attendance: 77,823
- Referee: Mike Defee
- TV announcers (ABC): Steve Levy, Brian Griese, and Todd McShay
- Box Score

Game information

Second quarter

- WIS – Rafael Gaglianone 30-yard field goal, 4:13. Wisconsin 3–0. Drive: 9 plays, 24 yards, 4:12.
- WIS – Rafael Gaglianone 48-yard field goal, 0:54. Wisconsin 6–0. Drive: 5 plays, 15 yards, 0:55.

Third quarter

- WIS – Corey Clement 5-yard run (Rafael Gaglianone kick), 10:55. Wisconsin 13–0. Drive: 5 plays, 58 yards, 1:56.
- LSU – Tre'Davious White 21-yard interception return (Colby Delahoussaye kick), 5:28. Wisconsin 13–7.
- LSU – Travin Dural 10-yard pass from Brandon Harris (Colby Delahoussaye kick), 4:21. LSU 14–13. Drive: 2 plays, 41 yards, 0:18.

Fourth quarter

- WIS – Rafael Gaglianone 47-yard field goal, 3:47. Wisconsin 16–14. Drive: 8 plays, 48 yards, 4:27.

Top passers

- LSU – Brandon Harris – 12/21, 131 yards, TD, 2 INT
- WIS – Bart Houston – 19/31, 205 yards, 2 INT

Top rushers

- LSU – Leonard Fournette – 23 rushes, 138 yards
- WIS – Corey Clement – 21 rushes, 86 yards, TD

Top receivers

- LSU – Travin Dural – 5 receptions, 50 yards, TD
- WIS – Troy Fumagalli – 7 receptions, 100 yards

The Badgers started off the regular season with a neutral site game against the LSU Tigers at Lambeau Field in Green Bay, Wisconsin. LSU was favored to win the game by double digits. The Badgers came out to lead 6–0 by halftime with the Badgers kicker, Rafael Gaglianone, making two field goals; one from 30 and the other 48 yards. Running back Corey Clement led the Badgers on their opening drive of the third quarter and scored a touchdown on a five-yard run. LSU responded with two touchdowns shortly thereafter due to a quick succession of Badgers' turnovers. Another field goal in the fourth quarter from 47 yards put the Badgers back in the lead. In the last minute of the game, and within field goal range, LSU quarterback Brandon Harris was nearly sacked by linebacker Vince Biegel and threw an interception which was caught by Safety D'Cota Dixon; LSU offensive lineman Josh Boutte was subsequently ejected for a flagrant hit after the play. The turnover secured the victory for the Badgers who in turn ran out the clock.

The game was fifth-year senior Bart Houston's debut as Wisconsin's starting quarterback, after being a backup quarterback for four years. His debut passer rating of 33.2 was the worst for a Wisconsin quarterback since 1977 when Mike Kalasmicki's debut passer rating was 5.20. Rafael Gaglianone had his fourth game-winning field goal of his career, the most in school history.

The game was described as a "historic upset" for the Badgers by ESPN and Yahoo! Sports. After the game ESPN Staff Writer Jesse Temple stated that "Wisconsin secured its most significant nonconference regular-season victory since 1974, when the team upset fourth-ranked Nebraska 21–20 at Camp Randall Stadium." The Badgers snapped the Tigers 52-game win streak for non-conference regular season wins, an FBS record that stood since a 2002 loss to Virginia Tech.

Following the game Wisconsin's kicker Rafael Gaglianone was lauded with multiple 'Player of the Week' awards, including Big Ten special teams player of the week, Rose Bowl Big Ten player of the week and one of three Lou Groza Award Stars of the Week. Wisconsin's Jack Cichy was named the Lott IMPACT Player of the Week for his defensive efforts. Wisconsin coach Paul Chryst was announced as the "Dodd Trophy Coach of the Week" following the opening week of college football. Paul Chryst announced in a press conference that Chris Orr, who went down the first play of the game with a right leg injury, would be out for the rest of the year due to a torn ACL. He also stated that former linebacker-turned-fullback Leon Jacobs would now play both sides of the ball at fullback in addition to inside linebacker, to regain some depth at the position due to Chris Orr's season-ending injury.

Starters on Offense
Position	Player	Class
QB	Bart Houston	RS Sr
RB	Corey Clement	Sr
FB	Austin Ramesh	RS Jr
WR	Robert Wheelwright	Sr
WR	Jazz Peavy	RS Jr
TE	Troy Fumagalli	RS Jr
LT	Ryan Ramczyk	RS Jr
LG	Micah Kapoi	RS So
C	Michael Dieter	RS So
RG	Beau Benzschawel	RS So
RT	Jacob Maxwell	RS So

Starters on Defense
Position	Player	Class
DE	Alec James	RS Jr
NT	Olive Sagapolu	RS So
DE	Connor Sheehy	RS Jr
OLB	Vince Biegel	RS Sr
ILB	Chris Orr	So
ILB	Jack Cichy	RS Jr
OLB	TJ Watt	RS Jr
CB	Soujorn Shelton	Sr
SS	D'Cota Dixon	Jr
FS	Leo Musso	RS Sr
CB	Derrick Tindal	Jr

=== Akron ===
Akron at No. 10 Wisconsin

Team	1	2	3	4	Total
Akron	0	10	0	0	10
• No. 10 Wisconsin	9	21	10	14	54

- Date: September 10
- Location: Camp Randall Stadium, Madison, WI
- Game start: 2:36 CST
- Elapsed time: 3:19
- Game attendance: 77,331
- Game weather: Temperature: 69, Wind: 10 WNW, Weather: Mostly Cloudy
- Referee: C. Johnson
- TV announcers (BTN): Matt Devlin (play-by-play)
  Stanley Jackson (analyst)

Scoring summary
1	08:05	WIS	Clement, C. 4 yard run (Caglianone, R. kick), 13 plays, 83 yards, TOP 6:55	7–0 WIS
1	02:28	WIS	Team 1 yard safety	9–0 WIS
2	13:45	WIS	Clement, C. 1 yard run (Gaglianone, R. kick), 8 plays, 53 yards, TOP 3:32	16–0 WIS
2	04:58	WIS	Peavy, J. 13 yard pass from Houston, B. (Gaglianone, R. kick), 9 plays, 73 yards, TOP 4:12	23–0 WIS
2	03:12	AKR	Natson, J. 55 yard punt return (O'Leary, T. kick)	23–7 WIS
2	02:10	WIS	Peavy, J. 34 yard pass from Houston, B. (Gaglianone, R. kick), 3 plays, 67 yards, TOP 0:57	30–7 WIS
2	00:00	AKR	O'Leary, T. 32 yard field goal, 8 plays, 60 yards, TOP 2:10	30–10 WIS
3	06:25	WIS	Gaglianone, R. 33 yard field goal, 12 plays, 57 yards, TOP 6:44	33–10 WIS
3	01:07	WIS	Ingold, A. 6 yard pass from Hornibrook, A. (Gaglianone, R. kick), 8 plays, 83 yards, TOP 4:22	40–10 WIS
4	11:17	WIS	Ramesh, A. 1 yard run (Gaglianone, R. kick), 7 plays, 63 yards, TOP 3:27	47–10 WIS
4	07:54	WIS	Shaw, B. 35 yard run (Gaglianone, R. kick), 3 plays, 44 yards, TOP 1:23	54–10 WIS

Statistical Leaders

- Rushing: Corey Clement – 21 carries, 111 yards (long 27), 5.3 yards/carry, 2 touchdowns
- Passing: Bart Houston – 15 completions, 22 passing attempts, 231 yards, 10.5 avg, 2 touchdowns
- Receiving: Jazz Peavy – 7 receptions, 100 yards, 14.3 avg, 34 long, 2 touchdowns
- Defense: T.J. Watt – 3 Tackles (3 solo), 1 Tackle-for-loss for 11 yds, 1 Sack

Starters on Offense
Position	Player	Class
QB	Bart Houston	RS Sr
RB	Corey Clement	Sr
FB	Austin Ramesh	RS Jr
WR	Robert Wheelwright	Sr
WR	Jazz Peavy	RS Jr
TE	Troy Fumagalli	RS Jr
LT	Ryan Ramczyk	RS Jr
LG	Micah Kapoi	RS So
C	Michael Dieter	RS So
RG	Beau Benzschawel	RS So
RT	Jacob Maxwell	RS So

Starters on Defense
Position	Player	Class
DE	Alec James	RS Jr
DE	Chikwe Obasih	RS Jr
OLB	Vince Biegel	RS Sr
ILB	Ryan Connelly	So
ILB	Jack Cichy	RS Jr
OLB	TJ Watt	RS Jr
CB	Soujorn Shelton	Sr
SS	D'Cota Dixon	Jr
FS	Leo Musso	RS Sr
CB	Derrick Tindal	Jr
CB	Natrell Jamerson	Jr

=== Georgia State ===
Georgia State at No. 9 Wisconsin

Team	1	2	3	4	Total
Georgia State	0	0	10	7	17
• No. 9 Wisconsin	6	0	7	10	23

- Date: September 17
- Location:
  Camp Randall Stadium
  Madison, WI
- Game start: 11:01 CST
- Elapsed time: 3:04
- Game attendance: 79,883
- Game weather: Temperature: 71, Wind: 6 WSW, Weather: Sunny
- Referee: G. Blum
- TV announcers: Brandon Gaudin (play-by-play)
  Chuck Long (analyst)

Scoring summary
1	07:20	WIS	Gaglianone, R. 41 yard field goal, 15 plays, 52 yard, TOP 7:40	3–0 WIS
1	00:51	WIS	Gaglianone, R. 28 yard field goal, 10 plays, 58 yards, TOP 5:09	6–0 WIS
3	06:00	GSU	ten Lohuis, R. 45 yard field goal, 10 plays 49 yards, TOP 4:25	6–3 WIS
3	02:58	WIS	Ogunbowale, D. 2 yard run (Gaglianone, R. kick), 6 plays, 69 yards, TOP 2:56	13–3 WIS
3	00:19	GSU	Davis, R. 13 yard pass from Manning, C. (ten Lohuis, R. kick), 6 plays, 75 yards, TOP 2:39	13–10 WIS
4	11:36	GSU	Neal, K. 9 yard run (ten Lohuis, R. kick), 3 plays, 38 yards, TOP 1:06	17–13 GSU
4	07:25	WIS	Penniston, K. 1 yard pass from Hornibrook, A. (Gaglianone, R. kick), 8 plays, 59 yards, TOP 4:03	20–17 WIS
4	03:36	WIS	Gaglianone, R. 41 yard field goal, 7 plays, 19 yards, TOP 2:17	23–17 WIS

The Badgers played against opponent Georgia State for the first time. The entire game was marked by offensive struggles on Wisconsin's part. Wisconsin jumped out to an early 6–0 lead on the foot of kicker Rafael Gaglianone, who converted field goal attempts from 47 and 28 yards in the 1st quarter. In the second half, things got ugly for the Badgers as Georgia State countered a touchdown run by Dare Ogunbowale with a field goal and touchdown of their own. With Wisconsin struggling to make progress on offense, Paul Chryst replaced QB Bart Houston with redshirt freshman Alex Hornibrook. In the 4th quarter, the winless Panthers took the lead 17–10 on a 9-yard run. Hornibrook, however, led the offense on two scoring drives - a touchdown pass to Kyle Penniston and another Gaglianone kick - to pull out the win. The Badgers improved to 3–0 on the season, but their struggles on offense led to questions about which quarterback would start next week's crucial Big Ten matchup against Michigan State.

Statistical Leaders

- Rushing: Dare Ogunbowale – 20 carries, 65 yards (long 19), 3.3 yards/carry, 1 touchdown
- Passing: Alex Hornibrook – 8 completions, 12 passing attempts, 122 yards, 10.2 avg, 1 touchdown, 1 interception
- Receiving: Jazz Peavy – 3 receptions, 67 yards, 22.3 avg, 29 long
- Defense: T.J. Edwards – 11 Tackles (6 solo), 1 Tackle-for-loss for 2 yds

Starters on Offense
Position	Player	Class
QB	Bart Houston	RS Sr
RB	Taiwan Deal	RS Fr
FB	Austin Ramesh	RS Jr
WR	Robert Wheelwright	Sr
WR	Jazz Peavy	RS Jr
TE	Troy Fumagalli	RS Jr
LT	Ryan Ramczyk	RS Jr
LG	Micah Kapoi	RS So
C	Michael Dieter	RS So
RG	Beau Benzschawel	RS So
RT	Jacob Maxwell	RS So

Starters on Defense
Position	Player	Class
DE	Connor Sheehy	RS Jr
DE	Chikwe Obasih	RS Jr
OLB	Vince Biegel	RS Sr
ILB	T.J. Edwards	RS So
ILB	Jack Cichy	RS Jr
OLB	TJ Watt	RS Jr
CB	Soujorn Shelton	Sr
SS	D'Cota Dixon	Jr
FS	Leo Musso	RS Sr
CB	Derrick Tindal	Jr
CB	Lubern Figaro	Jr

=== At No. 8 Michigan State ===
No. 11 Wisconsin at No. 8 Michigan State

Team	1	2	3	4	Total
• No. 11 Wisconsin	7	6	17	0	30
No. 8 Michigan State	3	3	0	0	6

- Date: September 24
- Location:
  Spartan Stadium
  East Lansing, MI
- Game start: 11:01
- Elapsed time: 3:12
- Game attendance: 75,505
- Game weather: Temperature: 63, Wind: 8 ENE, Weather: Partly Cloudy
- Referee: Jerry McGinn
- TV announcers (BTN): Kevin Kugler (play-by-play)
  Matt Millen (analyst)

Scoring summary
1	08:03	MSU	Geiger, M. 48 yard field goal, 7 plays, 16 yards, TOP 1:31	3–0 MSU
1	00:25	WIS	Steffes, E. 1 yard pass from Hornibrook, A. (Endicott, A. kick), 16 plays, 65 yards, TOP 7:38	7–3 WIS
2	07:14	WIS	Clement, C. 1 yard run (Endicott, A. kick failed, 6 plays 28 yards, TOP 2:40	13–3 WIS
2	01:18	MSU	Geiger, M. 40 yard field goal, 15 plays, 62 yards, TOP 5:51	13–6 WIS
3	13:10	WIS	Musso, L. 66 yard fumble return (Endicott, A. kick)	20–6 WIS
3	04:58	WIS	Endicott, A. 41 yard field goal, 10 plays, 54 yards, TOP 5:40	23–6 WIS
3	03:52	WIS	Clement, C. 5 yard run (Endicott, A kick), 1 play, 5 yards, TOP 0:06	30–6 WIS

Prior to the game, it was leaked that redshirt freshman quarterback Alex Hornibrook would make his debut and start against Michigan State after his performance the prior week against Georgia State. Wisconsin was also laden with injuries going into the game with two offensive line starters, Jon Dietzen and Micah Kapoi, out with injuries along with placekicker Rafael Gaglianone and fourth-string running back Bradrick Shaw.

Michigan State opened the scoring with a field goal by Michael Geiger in the first quarter on a drive started when MSU defensive lineman Raequan Williams stripped and recovered a fumble from Wisconsin's freshman quarterback. Wisconsin answered back with a seven-and-a-half minute drive resulting in a one-yard touchdown catch by tight end Eric Steffes. Thereafter, Wisconsin's defense shut down the Spartan offense and an interception by Sojourn Shelton in the second quarter resulted in a one-yard rushing touchdown by running back Corey Clement. The Spartans made another field goal to close out the first half. In the third quarter, Badgers defensive back D'Cota Dixon forced a fumble which was recovered by fellow Badgers DB Leo Musso who returned it for a 66-yard touchdown. Also in the third quarter, the Badgers replacement kicker Andrew Endicott made his first ever field goal attempt (college or high school) at 41 yards, Corey Clement had another five-yard rushing touchdown to round out the third quarter. Overall, the Badgers forced four turnovers. Hornibrook, on third down, completed nine of his 13 attempts for 136 yards and a touchdown and, on third and long (10+ yards), he was six for six for 100 yards.

It was the first time since 1999 that a Big Ten team beat two top ten teams by the first of October in the same season, the last being Penn State in 1999. The last time Wisconsin defeated two top ten teams in the same season was 1962. The last time Wisconsin beat MSU in East Lansing was in 2002 when Barry Alvarez was head coach. The last time Wisconsin beat a top ten team on the road was at No. 5 Purdue in 2004.

Wisconsin players were lauded after the game, including freshman QB Alex Hornibrook for making his debut on the road against No. 8 Michigan State and was named Big Ten Freshman of the Week. Outside Linebacker TJ Watt was named the Walter Camp Player of the Week and Big Ten Defensive Player of the Week for his dominant defensive performance, including 6 tackles, 3.5 tackles-for-loss, 2.5 sacks, one pass breakup and two quarterback hits.

Statistical leaders

- Rushing: Corey Clement – 23 carries, 54 yards (long 22), 2.3 yards/carry, 2 touchdowns
- Passing: Alex Hornibrook – 16 completions, 26 passing attempts, 195 yards, 7.5 avg, 1 touchdown, 1 interception
- Receiving: Jazz Peavy – 4 receptions, 96 yards, 24 avg, 31 long
- Defense: T.J. Watt – 6 Tackles (3 solo), 3.5 Tackle-for-loss for 12 yds, 2.5 sacks for 10 yds, 1 Pass breakup, 2 quarterback hits

Starters on Offense
Position	Player	Class
QB	Alex Hornibrook	RS Fr
RB	Corey Clement	Sr
FB	Austin Ramesh	RS Jr
WR	Robert Wheelwright	Sr
WR	Jazz Peavy	RS Jr
TE	Troy Fumagalli	RS Jr
LT	Ryan Ramczyk	RS Jr
LG	Michael Dieter	RS So
C	Brett Connors	RS So
RG	Beau Benzschawel	RS So
RT	Jacob Maxwell	RS So

Starters on Defense
Position	Player	Class
DE	Connor Sheehy	RS Jr
NT	Olive Sagapolu	So
DE	Chikwe Obasih	RS Jr
OLB	Vince Biegel	RS Sr
ILB	T.J. Edwards	RS So
ILB	Jack Cichy	RS Jr
OLB	TJ Watt	RS Jr
CB	Soujorn Shelton	Sr
SS	D'Cota Dixon	Jr
FS	Leo Musso	RS Sr
CB	Derrick Tindal	Jr

=== At No. 4 Michigan ===
No. 8 Wisconsin at No. 4 Michigan

Team	1	2	3	4	Total
No. 8 Wisconsin	0	0	7	0	7
• No. 4 Michigan	0	7	0	7	14

- Date: October 1
- Location: Michigan Stadium, Ann Arbor, MI
- Game start: 2:41
- Elapsed time: 3:21
- Game attendance: 111,846
- Game weather: Temperature: 68, Wind: 10-15 SE, Weather: Cloudy, light rain
- Referee: R. Snodgrass
- Television network: ABC

Scoring summary
2	14:56	MICH	Khalid Hill 1-yard run (Kenny Allen kick)	MICH 7–0
3	8:03	WIS	Dare Ogunbowale 7-yard pass from Alex Hornibrook (Andrew Endicott kick)	TIE 7–7
4	7:56	MICH	Amara Darboh 46-yard pass from Wilton Speight (Kenny Allen kick)	MICH 14–7

Statistical Leaders

- Rushing: Corey Clement – 17 carries, 68 yards (long 19), 4.0 yards/carry
- Passing: Alex Hornibrook – 9 completions, 25 passing attempts, 88 yards, 3.5 avg, 1 touchdown, 3 interceptions
- Receiving: Dare Ogunbowale – 3 receptions, 23 yards, 7.7 avg, 17 long
- Defense: Jack Cichy – 12 Tackles (10 solo), 0.5 Tackle-for-loss for 1 yd, 0.5 sack for 1 yd

Starters on Offense
Position	Player	Class
QB	Alex Hornibrook	RS Fr
RB	Corey Clement	Sr
FB	Austin Ramesh	RS Jr
WR	Robert Wheelwright	Sr
WR	Jazz Peavy	RS Jr
TE	Troy Fumagalli	RS Jr
LT	Ryan Ramczyk	RS Jr
LG	Michael Dieter	RS So
C	Brett Connors	RS So
RG	Beau Benzschawel	RS So
RT	Jacob Maxwell	RS So

Starters on Defense
Position	Player	Class
DE	Connor Sheehy	RS Jr
DE	Alec James	RS Jr
OLB	Garret Dooley	Jr
ILB	T.J. Edwards	RS So
ILB	Jack Cichy	RS Jr
OLB	TJ Watt	RS Jr
CB	Soujorn Shelton	Sr
SS	D'Cota Dixon	Jr
FS	Leo Musso	RS Sr
CB	Derrick Tindal	Jr
CB	Lubern Figaro	Jr

=== No. 2 Ohio State ===
No. 2 Ohio State at No. 8 Wisconsin

Team	1	2	3	4	OT	Total
• No. 2 Ohio State	3	3	7	10	7	30
No. 8 Wisconsin	10	6	0	7	0	23

- Date: October 15
- Location: Camp Randall Stadium, Madison, WI
- Game start: 7:12
- Elapsed time: 3:45
- Game attendance: 81,541
- Game weather: Temperature: 64, Wind: 6 S, Weather: Cloudy
- Referee: D. Willard
- Television network: ABC

Scoring summary
1	9:03	WIS	Andrew Endicott 46-yard field goal	WIS 3–0
1	6:17	WIS	Jazz Peavy 24-yard pass from Alex Hornibrook (Andrew Endicott kick)	WIS 10–0
1	2:46	OSU	Tyler Durbin 25-yard field goal	WIS 10–3
2	8:43	OSU	Tyler Durbin 40-yard field goal	WIS 10–6
2	2:47	WIS	Andrew Endicott 32-yard field goal	WIS 13–6
2	:14	WIS	Andrew Endicott 22-yard field goal	WIS 16–6
3	2:52	OSU	J. T. Barrett 1-yard run (Tyler Durbin kick)	WIS 16–13
4	14:09	OSU	J.T. Barrett 8-yard run (Tyler Durbin kick)	OSU 20–16
4	7:54	WIS	Austin Ramesh 4-yard run (Andrew Endicott kick)	WIS 23–20
4	3:57	OSU	Tyler Durbin 31-yard field goal	Tie 23–23
OT		OSU	Noah Brown 7-yard pass from J.T. Barrett (Tyler Durbin kick)	OSU 30–23

Statistical Leaders

- Rushing: Corey Clement – 25 carries, 164 yards (long 68), 6.6 yards/carry
- Passing: Alex Hornibrook – 16 completions, 28 passing attempts, 214 yards, 7.6 avg, 1 touchdown, 1 interception
- Receiving: Troy Fumagalli – 7 receptions, 84 yards, 12.0 avg, 30 long
- Defense: Jack Cichy – 15 Tackles (11 solo), 3.5 Tackle-for-loss for 7 yds, 1.0 sack for 2 yds

Starters on Offense
Position	Player	Class
QB	Alex Hornibrook	RS Fr
RB	Corey Clement	Sr
WR	Robert Wheelwright	Sr
WR	Jazz Peavy	RS Jr
TE	Troy Fumagalli	RS Jr
TE	Eric Steffes	RS Sr.
LT	Ryan Ramczyk	RS Jr
LG	Michael Dieter	RS So
C	Brett Connors	RS So
RG	Beau Benzschawel	RS So
RT	Jacob Maxwell	RS So

Starters on Defense
Position	Player	Class
DE	Connor Sheehy	RS Jr
NT	Olive Sagapolu	So
DE	Alec James	RS Jr
OLB	Garret Dooley	Jr
ILB	T.J. Edwards	RS So
ILB	Jack Cichy	RS Jr
OLB	TJ Watt	RS Jr
CB	Soujorn Shelton	Sr
SS	D'Cota Dixon	Jr
FS	Leo Musso	RS Sr
CB	Derrick Tindal	Jr

=== At Iowa ===
No. 10 Wisconsin at Iowa

Team	1	2	3	4	Total
• No. 10 Wisconsin	0	7	7	3	17
Iowa	0	6	0	3	9

- Date: October 22
- Location: Kinnick Stadium
  Iowa City, IA
- Game start: 11:01 a.m.
- Elapsed time: 3:25
- Game attendance: 70,585
- Game weather: Temperature: 49, Wind: 9 S, Weather: Clear
- Referee: J. Servinski
- Television network: ESPN

Scoring summary
2	10:06	WIS	Troy Fumagalli 17-yard pass from Bart Houston (Andrew Endicott Kick)	WIS 7–0
2	3:49	IOWA	Keith Duncan 41-yard field goal	WIS 7–3
2	0:00	IOWA	Miguel Recinos 47-yard field goal	WIS 7–6
3	7:20	WIS	Corey Clement 1-yard run (Andrew Endicott kick)	WIS 14–6
4	1:24	WIS	Andrew Endicott 36-yard field goal	WIS 17–6
4	00:43	IOWA	Keith Duncan 25-yard field goal	WIS 17–9

Statistical leaders

- Rushing: Corey Clement – 35 carries, 134 yards (long 34), 3.8 yards/carry
- Passing: Alex Hornibrook – 11 completions, 19 passing attempts, 197 yards, 10.4 avg
- Receiving: Troy Fumagalli – 2 receptions, 38 yards, 19.0 avg, 21 long, 1 touchdown
- Defense: Jack Cichy – 10 Tackles (6 solo), 1 quarterback hurry

Starters on Offense
Position	Player	Class
QB	Alex Hornibrook	RS Fr
RB	Corey Clement	Sr
FB	Austin Ramesh	RS Jr
WR	Quintez Cephus	Fr
WR	Jazz Peavy	RS Jr
TE	Troy Fumagalli	RS Jr
LT	Ryan Ramczyk	RS Jr
LG	Michael Dieter	RS So
C	Brett Connors	RS So
RG	Beau Benzschawel	RS So
RT	Jacob Maxwell	RS So

Starters on Defense
Position	Player	Class
DE	Chikwe Obasih	RS Jr
NT	Connor Sheehy	RS Jr
DE	Alec James	RS Jr
OLB	Vince Biegal	RS Sr
ILB	T.J. Edwards	RS So
ILB	Jack Cichy	RS Jr
OLB	TJ Watt	RS Jr
CB	Soujorn Shelton	Sr
SS	D'Cota Dixon	Jr
FS	Leo Musso	RS Sr
CB	Derrick Tindal	Jr

=== No. 7 Nebraska ===
No. 7 Nebraska at No. 11 Wisconsin

Team	1	2	3	4	OT	Total
No. 7 Nebraska	0	7	0	10	0	17
• No. 11 Wisconsin	7	3	7	0	6	23

- Date: October 29
- Location: Camp Randall Stadium
  Madison, WI
- Game start: 6:10 p.m.
- Elapsed time: 3:20
- Game attendance: 80,833
- Game weather: Temperature: 61, Wind: 7 NE, Weather: Partly Cloudy
- Referee: D. Capron
- Television network: ESPN

Scoring summary
1	9:38	WIS	Bradrick Shaw 21-yard run (Andrew Endicott Kick)	WIS 7–0
2	13:41	NEB	Devine Ozigbo 1-yard run (Drew Brown Kick)	TIE 7–7
2	6:53	WIS	Andrew Endicott 44-yard field goal	WIS 10–7
3	8:17	WIS	Rob Wheelwright 9-yard pass from Alex Hornibrook (Andrew Endicott kick)	WIS 17–7
4	13:45	NEB	Tommy Armstrong 2-yard run (Drew Brown Kick)	WIS 17–14
4	3:43	NEB	Drew Brown 35-yard field goal	TIE 17–17
OT	15:00	WIS	Dare Ogunbowale 11-yard run (Andrew Endicott Kick Failed)	WIS 23–17

Statistical Leaders

- Rushing: Dare Ogunbowale – 11 carries, 120 yards (long 39), 10.9 yards/carry, 1 touchdown
- Passing: Alex Hornibrook – 10 completions, 16 passing attempts, 71 yards, 4.4 avg, 1 touchdown, 1 interception
- Receiving: Rob Wheelwright – 5 receptions, 43 yards, 8.6 avg, 16 long, 1 touchdown
- Defense: Ryan Connelly – 11 Tackles (7 solo), 2.0 Tackle-for-loss for 2 yds

Starters on Offense
Position	Player	Class
QB	Alex Hornibrook	RS Fr
RB	Corey Clement	Sr
FB	Austin Ramesh	RS Jr
WR	Rob Wheelwright	Sr
WR	Jazz Peavy	RS Jr
TE	Troy Fumagalli	RS Jr
LT	Ryan Ramczyk	RS Jr
LG	Jon Dietzen	RS Fr
C	Michael Deiter	RS So
RG	Beau Benzschawel	RS So
RT	David Edwards	Fr

Starters on Defense
Position	Player	Class
DE	Chikwe Obasih	RS Jr
NT	Connor Sheehy	RS Jr
DE	Alec James	RS Jr
OLB	Vince Biegal	RS Sr
ILB	T.J. Edwards	RS So
ILB	Ryan Connelly	RS So
OLB	TJ Watt	RS Jr
CB	Soujorn Shelton	Sr
SS	D'Cota Dixon	Jr
FS	Leo Musso	RS Sr
CB	Derrick Tindal	Jr

=== At Northwestern ===
No. 8 Wisconsin at Northwestern

Team	1	2	3	4	Total
• No. 8 Wisconsin	0	10	3	8	21
Northwestern	0	7	0	0	7

- Date: November 5
- Location: Ryan Field
  Evanston, IL
- Game start: 11:06 a.m.
- Elapsed time: 3:18
- Game attendance: 42,016
- Game weather: Temperature: 59, Wind: 9 WSW, Weather: Clear
- Referee: M. Cannon
- Television network: ABC

Scoring summary
2	11:11	WIS	Andrew Endicott 40-yard field goal	WIS 3–0
2	7:33	WIS	Jazz Peavy 46-yard run (Andrew Endicott kick)	WIS 10–0
2	0:39	NU	Austin Carr 13-yard pass from Charlie Thorson (Jack Mitchell kick)	WIS 10–7
3	8:06	WIS	Andrew Endicott 28-yard field goal	WIS 13–7
4	8:57	WIS	Corey Clement 2-yard run (Alec Ingold rush)	WIS 21–7

Statistical Leaders

- Rushing: Corey Clement – 32 carries, 106 yards (long 15), 3.3 yards/carry, 1 touchdown
- Passing: Alex Hornibrook – 11 completions, 19 passing attempts, 92 yards, 4.8 avg
- Receiving: Jazz Peavy – 4 receptions, 73 yards, 18.3 avg, 32 long
- Defense: Leo Musso – 9 Tackles (9 solo), 1.0 Tackle-for-loss for 1 yd

Starters on Offense
Position	Player	Class
QB	Alex Hornibrook	RS Fr
RB	Corey Clement	Sr
WR	Quintez Cephus	Fr
TE	Eric Steffes	RS Sr
TE	Troy Fumagalli	RS Jr
TE	Kyle Penniston	RS Fr
LT	Ryan Ramczyk	RS Jr
LG	Jon Dietzen	RS Fr
C	Michael Deiter	RS So
RG	Beau Benzschawel	RS So
RT	David Edwards	Fr

Starters on Defense
Position	Player	Class
DE	Chikwe Obasih	RS Jr
NT	Connor Sheehy	RS Jr
DE	Alec James	RS Jr
OLB	Vince Biegal	RS Sr
ILB	T.J. Edwards	RS So
ILB	Ryan Connelly	RS So
OLB	TJ Watt	RS Jr
CB	Soujorn Shelton	Sr
SS	D'Cota Dixon	Jr
FS	Leo Musso	RS Sr
CB	Derrick Tindal	Jr

=== Illinois ===
Illinois at No. 7 Wisconsin

Team	1	2	3	4	Total
Illinois	3	0	0	0	3
• No. 7 Wisconsin	21	10	3	14	48

- Date: November 12
- Location: Camp Randall Stadium
  Madison, WI
- Game start: 2:35 p.m.
- Elapsed time: 3:05
- Game attendance: 79,340
- Game weather: Temperature: 50, Wind: 11 WSW, Weather: Mostly sunny
- Referee: R. Snodgrass
- Television network: ESPN2

Scoring summary
1	9:25	WIS	Corey Clement 2-yard run (Andrew Endicott kick)	WIS 7–0
1	6:59	WIS	Corey Clement 4-yard run (Andrew Endicott kick)	WIS 14–0
1	3:11	ILL	Chase McLaughlin 31-yard field goal	WIS 14–3
1	0:13	WIS	Jazz Peavy 8-yard pass from Alex Hornibrook (Andrew Endicott kick)	WIS 21–3
2	12:24	WIS	Kyle Penniston 7-yard pass from Bart Houston (Andrew Endicott kick)	WIS 28–3
2	0:04	WIS	Andrew Endicott 37-yard field goal	WIS 31–3
3	7:10	WIS	Andrew Endicott 21-yard field goal	WIS 34–3
4	14:18	WIS	Corey Clement 2-yard run (Andrew Endicott kick)	WIS 41–3
4	5:01	WIS	Bradrick Shaw 3-yard run (Andrew Endicott kick)	WIS 48–3

Statistical Leaders

- Rushing: Corey Clement – 25 carries, 123 yards (long 23), 4.9 yards/carry, 3 touchdowns
- Passing: Alex Hornibrook – 7 completions, 12 passing attempts, 85 yards, 7.1 avg, 1 touchdown
- Receiving: Jazz Peavy – 3 receptions, 29 yards, 9.7 avg, 17 long, 1 touchdown
- Defense: Ryan Connelly – 6 Tackles (2 solo), 1.5 Tackle-for-loss for 4 yds, 1 interception returned 12 yds

Starters on Offense
Position	Player	Class
QB	Alex Hornibrook	RS Fr
RB	Corey Clement	Sr
RB	Bradrick Shaw	RS Fr
WR	Quintez Cephus	Fr
TE	Eric Steffes	RS Sr
TE	Troy Fumagalli	RS Jr
LT	Ryan Ramczyk	RS Jr
LG	Jon Dietzen	RS Fr
C	Michael Deiter	RS So
RG	Beau Benzschawel	RS So
RT	David Edwards	Fr

Starters on Defense
Position	Player	Class
DE	Chikwe Obasih	RS Jr
NT	Connor Sheehy	RS Jr
OLB	Vince Biegal	RS Sr
ILB	T.J. Edwards	RS So
ILB	Ryan Connelly	RS So
OLB	TJ Watt	RS Jr
CB	Soujorn Shelton	Sr
SS	D'Cota Dixon	Jr
FS	Leo Musso	RS Sr
CB	Derrick Tindal	Jr
CB	Lubern Figaro	Jr

=== At Purdue ===
No. 6 Wisconsin at Purdue

Team	1	2	3	4	Total
• No. 6 Wisconsin	0	35	7	7	49
Purdue	3	7	3	7	20

- Date: November 19
- Location: Ross–Ade Stadium
  West Lafayette, IN
- Game start: 11:06 a.m.
- Elapsed time: 3:07
- Game attendance: 30,465
- Game weather: Temperature: 37, Wind: 24 W, Weather: Cloudy
- Referee: J. O'Neill
- Television network: ABC

Scoring summary
1	4:56	PUR	J. D. Dellinger 28-yard field goal	PUR 3–0
2	8:34	WIS	Alec Ingold 1-yard run (Andrew Endicott kick)	WIS 7–3
2	8:26	WIS	T.J. Watt 17-yard interception return (Andrew Endicott kick)	WIS 14–3
2	3:03	WIS	Bradrick Shaw 7-yard run (Andrew Endicott kick)	WIS 21–3
2	2:49	WIS	Alec Ingold 19-yard pass from Bart Houston (Andrew Endicott kick)	WIS 28–3
2	2:38	PUR	DeAngelo Yancey 75-yard pass from David Blough (J.D. Dellinger kick)	WIS 28–10
2	0:51	WIS	Bradrick Shaw 33-yard run (Andrew Endicott kick)	WIS 35–10
3	8:47	PUR	J.D. Dellinger 30-yard field goal	WIS 35–13
3	3:23	WIS	Jazz Peavy 25-yard pass from Alex Hornibrook (Andrew Endicott kick)	WIS 42–13
4	7:41	WIS	Corey Clement 6-yard run (Andrew Endicott kick)	WIS 49–13
4	4:15	PUR	DeAngelo Yancey 10-yard pass from David Blough (J.D. Dellinger kick) goal	WIS 49–20

Statistical Leaders

- Rushing: Corey Clement – 27 carries, 112 yards (long 13), 4.1 yards/carry, 1 touchdowns
- Passing: Bart Houston – 5 completions, 6 passing attempts, 102 yards, 17.0 avg, 1 touchdown
- Receiving: Dare Ogunbowale – 3 receptions, 62 yards, 20.7 avg, 34 long
- Defense: T.J. Watt – 2 Tackles (1 solo), 1.0 Tackle-for-loss for 3 yds, 1.0 sack for loss 3 yds, 1 interception returned 17 yds for TD

Starters on Offense
Position	Player	Class
QB	Alex Hornibrook	RS Fr
RB	Corey Clement	Sr
WR	Quintez Cephus	Fr
TE	Eric Steffes	RS Sr
TE	Troy Fumagalli	RS Jr
TE	Kyle Penniston	RS Fr
LT	Ryan Ramczyk	RS Jr
LG	Jon Dietzen	RS Fr
C	Michael Deiter	RS So
RG	Beau Benzschawel	RS So
RT	David Edwards	Fr

Starters on Defense
Position	Player	Class
DE	Chikwe Obasih	RS Jr
NT	Connor Sheehy	RS Jr
DE	Alec James	RS Jr
OLB	Vince Biegal	RS Sr
ILB	T.J. Edwards	RS So
ILB	Ryan Connelly	RS So
OLB	TJ Watt	RS Jr
CB	Soujorn Shelton	Sr
SS	D'Cota Dixon	Jr
FS	Leo Musso	RS Sr
CB	Derrick Tindal	Jr

=== Minnesota ===
Minnesota at No. 5 Wisconsin

Team	1	2	3	4	Total
Minnesota	3	14	0	0	17
• No. 5 Wisconsin	0	7	3	21	31

- Date: November 26
- Location: Camp Randall Stadium
  Madison, WI
- Game attendance: 77,216
- Television network: BTN

Scoring summary

Statistical Leaders

- Rushing: Corey Clement - 26 carries, 100 yards (long 15), 3.8 yards/carry, 2 touchdowns
- Passing: Bart Houston - 9 completions, 14 passing attempts, 8.8 avg, 123 yards
- Receiving: Jazz Peavy- 4 receptions, 47 yards, 11.8 avg, 14 long
- Defense: Sojourn Shelton- 1 tackle, 2 interceptions returned for a combined 40 yards

== Coaching staff ==
Name	Position	Joined staff	Alma mater
Paul Chryst	Head coach / quarterbacks coach	2015	Wisconsin
Joe Rudolph	Associate head coach / offensive coordinator / offensive line coach	2015	Wisconsin
Justin Wilcox	Defensive coordinator	2016	Oregon
John Settle	Running backs coach	2015	Appalachian State
Mickey Turner	Tight ends coach	2015	Wisconsin
Ted Gilmore	Wide receivers coach	2015	Wyoming
Jim Leonhard	Defensive backs coach	2016	Wisconsin
Tim Tibesar	Outside linebackers coach	2015	North Dakota
Inoke Breckterfield	Defensive line coach	2015	Oregon State
Chris Haering	Special teams coordinator	2015	West Virginia
Ross Kolodziej	Strength and conditioning coach	2015	Wisconsin

== Roster ==
The Badgers returned 13 starters, six on offense, six on defense and one on special teams.

2016 Wisconsin Badgers football team roster
Players
Coaches
Offense

Pos.	#	Name	Class
WR	1	Reggie Love	Sr
RB	5	Chris James	Jr
RB	6	Corey Clement	Sr
RB	7	Bradrick Shaw	Fr
QB	9	Karé Lyles	Fr
WR	11	Jazz Peavy	Jr
QB	12	Alex Hornibrook	Fr
QB	13	Bart Houston	Sr
QB	14	Garrett Groshek	Fr
WR	15	Robert Wheelright	Sr
WR	17	George Rushing	Jr
WR	19	Jack Dunn	Fr
FB	20	Austin Ramesh	Jr
RB	21	Mark Saari	So
RB	23	Dare Ogunbowale (C)	Sr
WR	24	Adam Krumholz	Fr
WR	27	Kendric Pryor	Fr
RB	28	Taiwan Deal	So
RB	29	Troy Laufenberg	Fr
FB	30	Aaron Maternowski	Fr
FB/ILB	32	Leon Jacobs	Jr
TE	41	Jake Hescock	Fr
TE	42	Gabe Lloyd	Fr
WR	43	Peter Roy	So
TE	44	Eric Steffes	Sr
FB	45	Alec Ingold	So
WR	46	Jack Popp	Fr
TE	48	Mitchell Herl	Fr
TE	49	Kyle Penniston	Fr
TE	49	Michael Rolfe	Fr
OL	52	Jacob Maxwell	So
OL	58	George Panos	So
OL	61	Tyler Biadasz	Fr
OL	62	Patrick Kasl	Fr
OL	63	Michael Deiter	So
OL	64	Brett Connors	So
OL	65	Ryan Ramczyk	Jr
OL	66	Beau Benzschawel	So
OL	67	Jon Dietzen	Fr
OL	68	David Moorman	Fr
OL	70	Dan Voltz	Sr
OL	71	Cole Van Lanen	Fr
OL	73	Kevin Estes	Fr
OL	75	Micah Kapoi	So
OL	76	Logan Schmidt	Sr
OL	77	Ian Dretzka	Fr
OL	78	Jason Erdmann	Fr
OL	79	David Edwards	Fr
TE	81	Troy Fumagalli	Jr
WR	82	Henry Houden	Fr
WR	84	A. J. Taylor	Fr
WR	86	Ricky Finco	So
WR	87	Quintez Cephus	Fr

Defense

Pos.	#	Name	Class
CB	8	Sojourn Shelton	Sr
CB	9	Titus Booker	So
S	10	Seth Currens	Fr
CB	11	Nick Nelson	Jr
CB	12	Natrell Jamerson	Jr
S	13	Evan Bondoc	So
S	14	D'Cota Dixon	Jr
CB	18	Caesar Williamss	Fr
S	19	Leo Musso	Sr
DB	20	Cristian Volpentesta	Fr
S	21	Arrington Farrar	So
S	22	Patrick Johnson	Fr
ILB	23	Mason Stokke	Fr
S	24	Keelon Brookins	Jr
CB	25	Derrick Tindal	Jr
S	28	Blake Mielke	Fr
CB	29	Dontye Carriere-Williams	Fr
CB	30	Serge Trezy	Sr
S	31	Lubern Figaro	Jr
FB/ILB	32	Leon Jacobs	Jr
DE	34	Chikwe Obasih	Jr
S	36	Joe Ferguson	Jr
S	37	Bret Verstegen	Fr
OLB	39	Jake Whalen	Fr
OLB	41	Max Praschak	Fr
OLB	42	T. J. Watt	Jr
ILB	43	Ryan Connelly	So
ILB	45	Nick Thomas	Fr
OLB	47	Vince Biegel (C)	Sr
OLB	47	Griffin Brady	Fr
ILB	48	Jack Cichy (injured)	Jr
ILB	50	Chris Orr (injured)	So
OLB	51	Noah Burks	Fr
DE	52	David Pfaff	Fr
ILB	53	T. J. Edwards	So
ILB	54	Dallas Jeanty	Fr
OLB	55	Garret Dooley	Jr
OLB	56	Zack Baun	Fr
DE	57	Alec James	Jr
ILB	58	Mike Maskalunas	Fr
OLB	59	Tyler Johnson	Fr
NT	65	Olive Sagapolu (injured)	So
DE	66	Kelly Thomas	Fr
DE	68	Hegeman Tiedt	Fr
NT	74	Gunnar Roberge	Fr
DE	91	Zander Neuville	So
NT	92	Jeremy Patterson	So
DE	93	Garrett Rand	Fr
DE	94	Conor Sheehy	Jr
OLB	95	Keldric Preston	Fr
DE	96	Billy Hirschfeld	So
DE	97	Isaiahh Loudermilk	Fr
DE	98	Kraig Howe	Fr

Special teams

Pos.	#	Name	Class
P	15	Anthony Lotti	Fr
K	27	Rafael Gaglianone	Jr
K	37	Andrew Endicott	Sr
K/P	38	P. J. Rosowski	So
K	39	Zach Hintze	Fr
LS	60	Connor Udelhoven	Jr
LS	89	Jake Cesear	Fr
P	96	Connor Allen	Fr
P	97	Zach Hoffman	Fr

Head coach

- Paul Chryst (Wisconsin)
  Also quarterbacks coach

Coordinators/assistant coaches

- Justin Wilcox (Oregon)
  Defensive coordinator, inside linebackers
- Joe Rudolph (Wisconsin)
  Associate head coach, offensive coordinator, offensive line coach
- John Settle (Appalachian State)
  Running backs coach
- Mickey Turner (Wisconsin)
  Tight ends coach
- Ted Gilmore (Wyoming)
  Wide receivers coach
- Jim Leonhard (Wisconsin)
  Defensive backs coach
- Tim Tibesar (North Dakota)
  Outside linebackers coach
- Inoke Breckterfield (Oregon State)
  Defensive line coach
- Chris Haering (West Virginia)
  Special teams coordinator
- Ross Kolodziej (Wisconsin)
  Strength and conditioning coach
- Antonio Fenelus (Wisconsin)
  Graduate assistant

Legend

- (C) Team captain
- (S) Suspended
- (I) Ineligible
- Injured
- Redshirt

Roster
Last update: August 23, 2016

=== Departures ===
In early August, after not making the 105-man fall roster, wide receiver Krenwick Sanders announced his intent to transfer from UW due to being buried on the depth chart, he had one catch for 10 yards his true freshman year in 2014 and he redshirted the 2015 season. He was granted a release by the university and announced that he would transfer to Jacksonville State, an FCS team in Alabama.

Later in August the Badgers' 3-year starter at center, fifth-year senior Dan Voltz, retired from football due to numerous injuries sustained over his career. In the 2015 season he tore his ACL against Illinois and was out for the remainder of the season. He suffered from various ankle issues during the 2014 season.

== Big Ten Players of the Week ==
Weekly Awards
Player	Award	Date Awarded	Ref.
Rafael Gaglianone	Big Ten Special Teams Player of the Week	September 5, 2016	
T. J. Watt	Big Ten Defensive Player of the Week	September 24, 2016	
Alex Hornibrook	Big Ten Freshman of the Week	September 24, 2016	
Jack Cichy	Big Ten Defensive Player of the Week	October 17, 2016	
Ryan Connelly	Co-Big Ten Defensive Player of the Week	October 31, 2015	

== 2017 NFL draft ==
=== 2017 NFL draft class ===
2017 NFL draft selections
Round	Pick #	Team	Player	Position
1	30	Pittsburgh Steelers	T. J. Watt	Outside linebacker
1	32	New Orleans Saints	Ryan Ramczyk	Offensive tackle
4	108	Green Bay Packers	Vince Biegel	Outside linebacker

=== Signed undrafted free agents ===
- Corey Clement, RB, Philadelphia Eagles
- Dare Ogunbowale, RB, Houston Texans
- Sojourn Shelton, CB, Arizona Cardinals
- Robert Wheelwright, WR, New York Giants
