= 2016 Western Michigan Broncos football team =

American college football season

2016 Western Michigan Broncos football

MAC champion MAC West Division champion

MAC Championship, W 29–23 vs. Ohio

Cotton Bowl Classic, L 16–24 vs. Wisconsin
- Conference: Mid-American Conference
- West Division

Ranking
- Coaches: No. 18
- AP: No. 15
- Record: 13–1 (8–0 MAC)
- Head coach: P. J. Fleck (4th season)
- Offensive coordinator: Kirk Ciarrocca (4th season)
- Offensive scheme: Spread
- Defensive coordinator: Ed Pinkham (4th season)
- Base defense: 4–3
- Home stadium: Waldo Stadium

2016 Mid-American Conference football standings
| | Conf. | | | Overall |
| Team | W | | L | W | | L |
|---|---|---|---|---|---|---|
East Division
| Ohio xy | 6 | – | 2 | 8 | – | 6 |
| Miami (OH) x | 6 | – | 2 | 6 | – | 7 |
| Akron | 3 | – | 5 | 5 | – | 7 |
| Bowling Green | 3 | – | 5 | 4 | – | 8 |
| Kent State | 2 | – | 6 | 3 | – | 9 |
| Buffalo | 1 | – | 7 | 2 | – | 10 |
West Division
| No. 15 Western Michigan xy$ | 8 | – | 0 | 13 | – | 1 |
| Toledo | 6 | – | 2 | 9 | – | 4 |
| Northern Illinois | 5 | – | 3 | 5 | – | 7 |
| Eastern Michigan | 4 | – | 4 | 7 | – | 6 |
| Central Michigan | 3 | – | 5 | 6 | – | 7 |
| Ball State | 1 | – | 7 | 4 | – | 8 |
Championship: Western Michigan 29, Ohio 23
$ – Conference champion; x – Division champion/co-champions; y – Championship game participant; Rankings from AP Poll

The 2016 Western Michigan Broncos football team represented Western Michigan University (WMU) in the 2016 NCAA Division I FBS football season. They were led by fourth-year head coach P. J. Fleck and played their home games at Waldo Stadium as a member of the West Division of the Mid-American Conference (MAC). The Broncos completed their regular season undefeated and won the MAC West Division title. The Broncos finished conference play defeating the Ohio Bobcats 29–23 in the 2016 MAC Championship Game, winning the school's first MAC championship title since 1988. WMU received an invitation to the 2017 Cotton Bowl as the highest rated Group of Five team in the College Football Playoff (CFP). It was the first major-bowl appearance in school history (and second for a MAC team). The Broncos also won 10 games in a season for the first time in their 111-year football history. They lost to the No. 8 Wisconsin Badgers in the New Years Six bowl game, 24–16.

WMU received its first national top 25 ranking after they beat rival Central Michigan and was No. 25 in the Coaches Poll. Following its first win over Northern Illinois since 2008, the Broncos were ranked in the AP Top 25 for the first time in school history at No. 24 in week seven. The Broncos debuted in the CFP poll at No. 23. They finished the regular season ranked 18th in the Coaches Poll and 15th in the AP Poll.

== Preseason ==
=== MAC media poll ===
The Mid-American Conference preseason poll was released on July 28, 2016. The Broncos were predicted to finish first in the West Division and win the MAC Championship Game.

MAC West Division media poll
| Predicted finish | Team | Votes (1st place) |
| 1 | Western Michigan | 144 (19) |
| 2 | Toledo | 113 (2) |
| 3 | Northern Illinois | 112 (3) |
| 4 | Central Michigan | 98 (2) |
| 5 | Ball State | 44 |
| 6 | Eastern Michigan | 35 |

== Schedule ==
The following table lists WMU schedule.

| Date | Time | Opponent | Rank | Site | TV | Result | Attendance |
|---|---|---|---|---|---|---|---|
| September 3 | Noon | at Northwestern* | | Ryan Field; Evanston, IL | ESPNU | W 22–21 | 30,635 |
| September 10 | 7:00 pm | North Carolina Central* | | Waldo Stadium; Kalamazoo, MI | ESPN3 | W 70–21 | 23,727 |
| September 17 | 4:00 pm | at Illinois* | | Memorial Stadium; Champaign, IL | ESPNews | W 34–10 | 40,954 |
| September 24 | 7:00 pm | Georgia Southern* | | Waldo Stadium; Kalamazoo, MI | ESPN3 | W 49–31 | 17,208 |
| October 1 | 7:00 pm | at Central Michigan | | Kelly/Shorts Stadium; Mount Pleasant, MI (Michigan MAC Trophy/Victory Cannon) | CBSSN | W 49–10 | 30,411 |
| October 8 | 6:30 pm | Northern Illinois^{†} | | Waldo Stadium; Kalamazoo, MI | CBSSN | W 45–30 | 28,042 |
| October 15 | 3:30 pm | at Akron | No. 24 | InfoCision Stadium; Akron, OH | CBSSN | W 41–0 | 11,321 |
| October 22 | 3:30 pm | Eastern Michigan | No. 20 | Waldo Stadium; Kalamazoo, MI (Michigan MAC Trophy) | ASN | W 45–31 | 23,721 |
| November 1 | 8:00 pm | at Ball State | No. 23 | Scheumann Stadium; Muncie, IN | ESPN2 | W 52–20 | 5,614 |
| November 8 | 7:30 pm | at Kent State | No. 21 | Dix Stadium; Kent, OH | ESPN2 | W 37–21 | 4,536 |
| November 19 | 3:30 pm | Buffalo | No. 21 | Waldo Stadium; Kalamazoo, MI (College GameDay) | ESPNU | W 38–0 | 26,136 |
| November 25 | 5:00 pm | Toledo | No. 21 | Waldo Stadium; Kalamazoo, MI | ESPN2 | W 55–35 | 24,191 |
| December 2 | 7:00 pm | vs. Ohio | No. 17 | Ford Field; Detroit, MI (MAC Championship Game) | ESPN2 | W 29–23 | 45,615 |
| January 2, 2017 | 1:00 pm | vs. No. 8 Wisconsin* | No. 15 | AT&T Stadium; Arlington, TX (Cotton Bowl Classic) | ESPN | L 16–24 | 59,615 |
*Non-conference game; ^{†}Homecoming; Rankings from AP Poll and CFP Rankings after November 1 released prior to game; All times are in Eastern time

== Coaching staff ==
The following table lists the team's coaching staff.

| Name | Position | Year at WMU | Alma mater |
|---|---|---|---|
| P. J. Fleck | Head coach | 4th | Northern Illinois (2004) |
| Kirk Ciarrocca | Offensive coordinator | 4th | Temple (1990) |
| Ed Pinkham | Defensive coordinator, defensive backs | 4th | Allegheny (1975) |
| Kenni Burns | Running backs | 1st | Indiana (2006) |
| Brian Callahan | Offensive line | 4th | Eastern Illinois (1992) |
| David Duggan | Linebackers | 1st | New Hampshire (1986) |
| Bill Kenney | Tight ends, offensive tackles | 4th | Norwich (1982) |
| Matt Simon | Wide receivers | 3rd | Northern Illinois (2004) |
| Rob Wenger | Special teams, defensive ends | 4th | Colgate (2008) |
| Jimmy Williams | Defensive line | 1st | Nebraska (1982) |

== Roster ==
2016 Western Michigan Broncos football
| Quarterback: 1 Alex Mussat – (redshirt) Freshman, 6 ft 2 in (1.88 m), 205 lb (93 kg); 9 Brendan Tabone – Freshman, 6 ft 0 in (1.83 m), 186 lb (84 kg); 11 Zach Terrell – (redshirt) Senior, 6 ft 2 in (1.88 m), 204 lb (93 kg); 13 Tom Flacco – Sophomore, 6 ft 0 in (1.83 m), 199 lb (90 kg); 16 Jon Wassink – (redshirt) Freshman, 6 ft 2 in (1.88 m), 200 lb (91 kg); Tailback: 3 Fabian Johnson – Senior, 5 ft 7 in (1.70 m), 204 lb (93 kg); 5 LeVante Bellamy – Sophomore, 5 ft 9 in (1.75 m), 185 lb (84 kg); 22 Davon Tucker – (redshirt) Freshman, 5 ft 8 in (1.73 m), 205 lb (93 kg); 28 Matt Falcon – Freshman, 6 ft 1 in (1.85 m), 210 lb (95 kg); 31 Jarvion Franklin – Junior, 6 ft 0 in (1.83 m), 228 lb (103 kg); 32 Jamauri Bogan – (redshirt) Sophomore, 5 ft 7 in (1.70 m), 187 lb (85 kg); 33 Leo Ekwoge – (redshirt) Sophomore, 5 ft 11 in (1.80 m), 210 lb (95 kg); Wide receiver: 2 Anton Curtis – (redshirt) Freshman, 6 ft 0 in (1.83 m), 185 lb (84 kg); 7 D'Wayne Eskridge – Freshman, 5 ft 9 in (1.75 m), 190 lb (86 kg); 10 Hunter Broersma – Freshman, 6 ft 1 in (1.85 m), 192 lb (87 kg); 15 Carrington Thompson – (redshirt) Senior, 6 ft 2 in (1.88 m), 176 lb (80 kg); 19 Jason Russell – Freshman, 5 ft 11 in (1.80 m), 190 lb (86 kg); 25 Trevor Sweeney – Senior, 5 ft 8 in (1.73 m), 175 lb (79 kg); 29 Rodney Graves – Freshman, 6 ft 1 in (1.85 m), 171 lb (78 kg); 35 Brandon Hinds – Freshman, 5 ft 11 in (1.80 m), 166 lb (75 kg); 45 Jaret Curtis – Freshman, 5 ft 11 in (1.80 m), 190 lb (86 kg); 80 Jake Spinek – Senior, 5 ft 10 in (1.78 m), 186 lb (84 kg); 83 Michael Henry – Senior, 5 ft 11 in (1.80 m), 189 lb (86 kg); 84 Corey Davis – Senior, 6 ft 3 in (1.91 m), 213 lb (97 kg); 86 Keishawn Watson – (redshirt) Freshman, 5 ft 11 in (1.80 m), 180 lb (82 kg); 87 Giovanni Ricci – (redshirt) Freshman, 6 ft 3 in (1.91 m), 206 lb (93 kg); Tight end: 12 Mitch Heimbuch – Freshman, 6 ft 3 in (1.91 m), 245 lb (111 kg); 38 Odell Miller – (redshirt) Sophomore, 6 ft 3 in (1.91 m), 261 lb (118 kg); 85 Donnie Ernsberger – Junior, 6 ft 3 in (1.91 m), 255 lb (116 kg); 88 Lucas Bezerra – Junior, 6 ft 4 in (1.93 m), 248 lb (112 kg); 89 Brett Borske – Freshman, 6 ft 6 in (1.98 m), 250 lb (110 kg) | Offensive lineman: 51 Jordan Asbury – Freshman, 6 ft 3 in (1.91 m), 275 lb (125 kg); 52 John Keenoy – Sophomore, 6 ft 3 in (1.91 m), 305 lb (138 kg); 59 Luke Juriga – Sophomore, 6 ft 4 in (1.93 m), 289 lb (131 kg); 60 Mark Brooks – Freshman, 6 ft 6 in (1.98 m), 270 lb (120 kg); 61 Mike Caliendo – Freshman, 6 ft 4 in (1.93 m), 293 lb (133 kg); 62 Alex Keys – Freshman, 6 ft 1 in (1.85 m), 295 lb (134 kg); 63 Kristof Ifkovits – (redshirt) Junior, 6 ft 4 in (1.93 m), 295 lb (134 kg); 65 Jackson Day – Senior, 6 ft 3 in (1.91 m), 292 lb (132 kg); 67 Curtis Doyle – (redshirt) Sophomore, 6 ft 5 in (1.96 m), 308 lb (140 kg); 70 Spencer Kanz – Freshman, 6 ft 6 in (1.98 m), 290 lb (130 kg); 71 Jonathan Todd – (redshirt) Freshman, 6 ft 6 in (1.98 m), 330 lb (150 kg); 72 Taylor Moton – (redshirt) Senior, 6 ft 5 in (1.96 m), 328 lb (149 kg); 75 Zach Novoselsky – (redshirt) Sophomore, 6 ft 5 in (1.96 m), 299 lb (136 kg); 77 Chukwuma Okorafor – Junior, 6 ft 6 in (1.98 m), 333 lb (151 kg); 78 Elliot Jordan – (redshirt) Sophomore, 6 ft 6 in (1.98 m), 282 lb (128 kg); Defensive lineman: 1 Keion Adams – DE – Senior, 6 ft 2 in (1.88 m), 245 lb (111 kg); 5 Andre Turner – DE – (redshirt) Junior, 6 ft 4 in (1.93 m), 266 lb (121 kg); 33 Eric Assoua – Sophomore, 6 ft 2 in (1.88 m), 230 lb (100 kg); 50 Daniel Jackson – Sophomore, 6 ft 2 in (1.88 m), 263 lb (119 kg); 53 Nathan Braster – Junior, 6 ft 5 in (1.96 m), 272 lb (123 kg); 55 Nick Matich – Junior, 6 ft 2 in (1.88 m), 288 lb (131 kg); 58 Antonio Balabani – (redshirt) Freshman, 6 ft 3 in (1.91 m), 218 lb (99 kg); 66 Wesley French – (redshirt) Freshman, 6 ft 5 in (1.96 m), 311 lb (141 kg); 68 David Curle – Senior, 6 ft 3 in (1.91 m), 303 lb (137 kg); 90 Ken Aguirre – Freshman, 6 ft 1 in (1.85 m), 300 lb (140 kg); 91 Ken Finley – Sophomore, 6 ft 2 in (1.88 m), 298 lb (135 kg); 92 Zack Taylor – Freshman, 6 ft 2 in (1.88 m), 295 lb (134 kg); 95 Jaylon Moore – Freshman, 6 ft 5 in (1.96 m), 280 lb (130 kg); 98 Kailen Guillory – Freshman, 6 ft 5 in (1.96 m), 262 lb (119 kg); Kicker: 37 Butch Hampton – Freshman, 6 ft 0 in (1.83 m), 170 lb (77 kg); 47 Keenan Erb – Sophomore, 5 ft 7 in (1.70 m), 170 lb (77 kg); 93 Austin Regan – (redshirt) Sophomore, 6 ft 1 in (1.85 m), 190 lb (86 kg); 96 Jason Evans – (redshirt) Sophomore, 5 ft 10 in (1.78 m), 184 lb (83 kg) | Linebacker: 6 Asantay Brown – Junior, 6 ft 0 in (1.83 m), 203 lb (92 kg); 8 Caleb Bailey – (redshirt) Junior, 6 ft 0 in (1.83 m), 236 lb (107 kg); 10 Robert Spillane – Junior, 6 ft 2 in (1.88 m), 218 lb (99 kg); 13 Jakevin Jackson – Senior, 6 ft 2 in (1.88 m), 221 lb (100 kg); 20 Drake Spears – Freshman, 6 ft 1 in (1.85 m), 205 lb (93 kg); 27 Paul Engram – (redshirt) Freshman, 5 ft 10 in (1.78 m), 221 lb (100 kg); 34 Alex Grace – Sophomore, 6 ft 1 in (1.85 m), 216 lb (98 kg); 42 Jared Culp – Freshman, 6 ft 2 in (1.88 m), 225 lb (102 kg); 46 Lucas Cherocci – Senior, 5 ft 11 in (1.80 m), 216 lb (98 kg); 48 Joseph Miller – Freshman, 5 ft 9 in (1.75 m), 222 lb (101 kg); 56 Kasey Carson – (redshirt) Senior, 5 ft 11 in (1.80 m), 206 lb (93 kg); Defensive back: 2 Justin Tranquill – (redshirt) Freshman, 5 ft 11 in (1.80 m), 185 lb (84 kg); 4 Darius Phillips – CB – Junior, 5 ft 10 in (1.78 m), 191 lb (87 kg); 11 Stefan Claiborne – Freshman, 6 ft 2 in (1.88 m), 185 lb (84 kg); 12 Emmanuel Jackson – Freshman, 5 ft 11 in (1.80 m), 170 lb (77 kg); 17 Justin Ferguson – S – (redshirt) Senior, 6 ft 1 in (1.85 m), 203 lb (92 kg); 18 Sam Beal – Sophomore, 6 ft 1 in (1.85 m), 177 lb (80 kg); 21 Jeffery Johnson – S – (redshirt) Senior, 5 ft 8 in (1.73 m), 195 lb (88 kg); 22 Dontre Boyd – CB – Freshman, 5 ft 9 in (1.75 m), 155 lb (70 kg); 23 Austin Guido – Senior, 5 ft 11 in (1.80 m), 202 lb (92 kg); 24 Obbie Jackson – (redshirt) Freshman, 5 ft 10 in (1.78 m), 155 lb (70 kg); 26 Davontae Ginwright – (redshirt) Freshman, 6 ft 2 in (1.88 m), 191 lb (87 kg); 30 Malik Rucker – (redshirt) Junior, 5 ft 10 in (1.78 m), 174 lb (79 kg); 31 Brad Tanner – Freshman, 6 ft 1 in (1.85 m), 190 lb (86 kg); 36 Deshawn Foster – Sophomore, 5 ft 11 in (1.80 m), 224 lb (102 kg); 41 Latrell Levanduski – Junior, 5 ft 9 in (1.75 m), 194 lb (88 kg); 45 Bill Bonnano – Junior, 5 ft 8 in (1.73 m), 190 lb (86 kg); Punter: 39 Derrick Mitchell – Sophomore, 6 ft 2 in (1.88 m), 207 lb (94 kg); 57 James Coleman – Senior, 6 ft 2 in (1.88 m), 215 lb (98 kg); Long snappers: 43 Wyatt Pfeifer – Junior, 6 ft 2 in (1.88 m), 239 lb (108 kg); 99 Martin Diaz – (redshirt) Sophomore, 5 ft 10 in (1.78 m), 196 lb (89 kg) |

== Season ==
=== Home invasion arrests ===
During the week leading up to the opening game, two freshmen, Ron George and Bryson White, were arraigned on charges of "armed robbery, first-degree home invasion and larceny from a building". The police allege that they used a gun and a knife to rob a woman.

White was already facing criminal charges in Ohio related to driving under the influence of marijuana and driving on a suspended license. A passenger in his car was charged with carrying a gun and White refused to cooperate when asked about it.

The players were dismissed from the team.

=== All-Americans ===
Taylor Moton was named to the Football Writers' Association of America All-American second team.

Corey Davis was named as a first team All-American by the Associated Press, the FWAA, and the American Football Coaches Association, earning him honors as the school's first "consensus" All-American. He earned second team honors from The Sporting News and the Walter Camp Football Foundation.

=== Campbell Trophy ===
For his classroom exploits that include a 4.0 GPA in his Masters' program, quarterback Zach Terrell won the prestigious Campbell Trophy, known as the "academic Heisman."

=== National Football Foundation ===
Zach Terrell was chosen as a scholar athlete by the National Football Foundation as one of 12 athletes across all four (FBS, FCS, II, III) divisions of college football to receive an $18,000 post-graduate scholarship.

=== Conference Players of the Week ===
Robert Spillane was named MAC West Defensive Player of the Week for his week one performance in the team's 22–21 win at Northwestern in which he collected seven tackles and forced a fumble. Spillane later earned Co-Defensive Player of the Week honors in the Broncos' week three win at Illinois in which he made 11 tackles and snagged his first career interception. Spillane later earned DPOW honors with 14 tackles in the Broncos' 45–31 win over Eastern Michigan in week eight. In the Broncos' 37–21 win over Kent State, Spillane recorded a crucial safety that resulted in week ten honors.

Darius Phillips was named MAC West Special Teams Player of the Week for his week two performance against North Carolina Central that included a 66-yard punt return touchdown. Phillips' standout performance that included a 100-yard kick return touchdown in week four against Georgia Southern earned him STPOW honors in week five.

Jamauri Bogan earned honors as MAC West Co-Offensive Player of the Week for his 189 rushing yards and two touchdowns at Illinois in week three.

Zach Terrell became the week four MAC West Offensive Player of the Week for his 270 yards passing and four touchdowns in the Broncos' 49–31 win over Georgia Southern. Terrell would garner honors again for his 445-yard passing performance in the Broncos' 38–0 rout of Buffalo.

Wide receiver Corey Davis had six receptions for 72 yards and two touchdowns against rival Central Michigan earned him week five MAC West Offensive Player of the Week honors as he passed former Bronco Jordan White for the conference record for career receiving yards. Davis would snag honors again with a 12-reception, 272-yard receiving effort that included three touchdowns against Ball State.

Jarvion Franklin, the 2014 MAC Offensive Player of the Year and MAC Freshman of the Year received honors as MAC West Offensive Player of the Week after the Broncos' 45–30 win over Northern Illinois in week six during which he tallied 249 all-purpose yards (169 rushing and 80 receiving) with a receiving touchdown and a rushing touchdown (both on fourth down plays) to help buoy WMU's offensive efforts. Later, in week seven at Akron, Franklin again earned MAC West honors as he set the school record for single game rushing with 281 yards on 33 attempts in the Broncos' 41–0 win over the Zips.

Caleb Bailey collected seven tackles (including 2.5 tackles for loss) and an interception in the Broncos' 41–0 victory at Akron to earn week seven honors as MAC West Defensive Player of the Week.

Asantay Brown tallied six tackles, including one for loss, and an interception return for a touchdown in the Broncos' 55–35 rout of Toledo in week 13, earning him honors as MAC West Defensive Player of the Week.

=== Scholar Athletes of the Week ===
Zach Terrell earned honors as Scholar Athlete of the Week for the week of Oct. 3–10 for his performance in the Broncos' 45–30 win over Northern Illinois on Oct. 8. He completed 18 of 24 passes for 327 yards and accounted for four touchdowns total (three passing, one rushing) in the first Western Michigan victory over the Huskies since 2008. Terrell boasted a 4.0 GPA in his Master's of Business Administration program and completed his undergraduate degree in finance earlier in 2016 with a GPA of 3.66.

Taylor Moton earned honors as Scholar Athlete of the Week for the week of Nov. 14–21 for his performance in the Broncos' 37–21 win over Kent State as he helped buoy an effort of 329 rushing yards against the Golden Flashes on national television. Moton spent most of the year rated at No. 1 on the Schneider Scale, which is used to determine the Outland Trophy winner (best offensive lineman not playing center).

=== Distinguished Scholar Athletes ===
On December 27, 2016, the Mid-American Conference named seven Broncos as Distinguished Scholar Athletes:

- Lucas Bezerra (TE) 3.71 GPA
- Kasey Carson (LB) 3.58 GPA
- John Keenoy (OL) 3.7 GPA
- Taylor Moton (OL) 3.28 GPA
- Trevor Sweeney (WR) 3.77 GPA
- Zach Terrell (QB) 4.0 GPA
- Justin Tranquill (DB) 3.85 GPA

=== Academic All-Conference ===
Sixteen players from the team were named to the Academic All-Conference team: Lucas Bezzera, Kasey Carson, Lucas Cherocci, David Curle, Alex Grace, Austin Guido, Luke Juriga, John Keenoy, Odell Miller, Derek Mitchell, Taylor Moton, Zach Novoselsky, Giovanni Ricci, Trevor Sweeney, Zach Terrell and Justin Tranquill.

== Rankings ==
After winning their first two games against Northwestern and North Carolina Central, WMU received 1 vote in the Coaches Poll. Their road win against Illinois moved the Broncos to 3–0 where they received 6 votes in the AP Poll and 16 votes in the Coaches Poll. WMU received their first Top 25 ranking in program history after they defeated rival Central Michigan and moved to 5–0.

The table below shows the week-by-week status of WMU in the college football polls.

Ranking movements Legend: ██ Increase in ranking ██ Decrease in ranking — = Not ranked RV = Received votes
| | Week | | | | | | | | | | | | | | | |
| Poll | Pre | 1 | 2 | 3 | 4 | 5 | 6 | 7 | 8 | 9 | 10 | 11 | 12 | 13 | 14 | Final |
|---|---|---|---|---|---|---|---|---|---|---|---|---|---|---|---|---|
| AP | — | — | — | RV | RV | RV | 24 | 20 | 20 | 17 | 14 | 14 | 14 | 13 | 12 | 15 |
| Coaches | — | — | RV | RV | RV | 25 | 23 | 20 | 21 | 18 | 21 | 21 | 18 | 14 | 14 | 18 |
| CFP | Not released | | | | | | | | | 23 | 21 | 21 | 21 | 17 | 15 | Not released |

== Game summaries ==
=== Northwestern ===
Western Michigan at Northwestern

| Team | 1 | 2 | 3 | 4 | Total |
|---|---|---|---|---|---|
| • Broncos | 0 | 6 | 10 | 6 | 22 |
| Wildcats | 7 | 0 | 7 | 7 | 21 |

- Date: September 3
- Location: Ryan Field, Evanston, IL
- Game start: 11:01 a.m. CDT
- Elapsed time: 3:13
- Game attendance: 30,635
- Game weather: 72°F, wind: 7 MPH E, sunny
- Referee: John O'Neill
- TV announcers (ESPNU): Clay Matvick (play-by-play), Dusty Dvoracek (analyst)

Scoring summary
| 1 | 9:54 | NW | Justin Jackson 1-yard run (Jack Mitchell kick) | 7–0 NW |
| 2 | 5:28 | WMU | Butch Hampton 47-yard field goal | 7–3 NW |
| 2 | 0:13 | WMU | Butch Hampton 27-yard field goal | 7–6 NW |
| 3 | 12:31 | WMU | D'Wayne Eskridge 13-yard pass from Zach Terrell (Butch Hampton kick) | 13–7 WMU |
| 3 | 7:39 | NW | Justin Jackson 46-yard run (Jack Mitchell kick) | 14–13 NW |
| 3 | 0:17 | WMU | Butch Hampton 30-yard field goal | 16–14 WMU |
| 4 | 12:13 | NW | Justin Jackson 1-yard run (Jack Mitchell kick) | 21–16 NW |
| 4 | 5:38 | WMU | Jamauri Bogan 1-yard run (2-point conversion attempt failed) | 22–21 WMU |

| Series record | Previous meeting | Result |
|---|---|---|
| Tied 1–1 | 2013 | NW, 38–17 |

Western Michigan withstood a three-touchdown effort from Northwestern running back Justin Jackson and used a late Jamauri Bogan touchdown to win its season opener in Evanston. The Broncos recovered a fumble late in the game that was upheld on video review. It marked the Broncos' first win over a Big Ten school since 2008.

=== North Carolina Central ===
North Carolina Central at Western Michigan

| Team | 1 | 2 | 3 | 4 | Total |
|---|---|---|---|---|---|
| Eagles | 7 | 14 | 0 | 0 | 21 |
| • Broncos | 28 | 14 | 14 | 14 | 70 |

- Date: September 10
- Location:
  Waldo Stadium
  Kalamazoo, MI
- Game start: 7:05 pm EDT
- Elapsed time: 4:56
- Game attendance: 23,727
- Game weather: 66°F, wind: 17 MPH W, partly cloudy
- Referee: Matt Gallagher
- TV announcers (ESPN3): Dan Gutowsky (play-by-play), Marcus Ray (analyst)

Scoring summary
| 1 | 14:25 | WMU | Corey Davis 52-yard pass from Zach Terrell (Butch Hampton kick) | 7–0 WMU |
| 1 | 09:00 | WMU | Jamauri Bogan 5-yard run (Butch Hampton kick) | 14–0 WMU |
| 1 | 04:06 | NCCU | Malcolm Bell 4-yard run (Brandon McLaren kick) | 14–7 WMU |
| 1 | 01:54 | WMU | Carrington Thompson 26-yard pass from Zach Terrell (Butch Hampton kick) | 21–7 WMU |
| 1 | 00:27 | WMU | Darius Phillips 66-yard punt return (Butch Hampton kick) | 28–7 WMU |
| 2 | 09:28 | WMU | Corey Davis 46-yard pass from Zach Terrell (Butch Hampton kick) | 35–7 WMU |
| 2 | 04:23 | NCCU | LaVontis Smith 71-yard pass from Malcolm Bell (Brandon McLaren kick) | 35–14 WMU |
| 2 | 01:09 | WMU | Levante Bellamy 3-yard run (Butch Hampton kick) | 42–14 WMU |
| 2 | 00:05 | NCCU | David Miller 1-yard pass from Malcolm Bell (Brandon McLaren kick) | 42–21 WMU |
| 3 | 10:01 | WMU | Zach Terrell 10-yard run (Butch Hampton kick) | 49–21 WMU |
| 3 | 04:39 | WMU | Corey Davis 10-yard pass from Zach Terrell (Butch Hampton kick) | 56–21 WMU |
| 4 | 14:10 | WMU | Jarvion Franklin 1-yard run (Butch Hampton kick) | 63–21 WMU |
| 4 | 04:26 | WMU | Davon Tucker 1-yard run (Butch Hampton kick) | 70–21 WMU |

| Series record | Previous meeting | Result |
|---|---|---|
| WMU leads 1–0 | N/A | N/A |

Seven different Western Michigan players scored touchdowns in the Broncos' home-opening 70–21 win over Division I FCS opponent North Carolina Central.

=== Illinois ===
Western Michigan at Illinois

| Team | 1 | 2 | 3 | 4 | Total |
|---|---|---|---|---|---|
| • Broncos | 14 | 10 | 3 | 7 | 34 |
| Fighting Illini | 0 | 7 | 3 | 0 | 10 |

- Date: September 17
- Location:
  Memorial Stadium
  Champaign, IL
- Game start: 3:02 pm CDT
- Elapsed time: 3:18
- Game attendance: 40,954
- Game weather: 78 F, Wind: WNW 7 MPH, Partly Cloudy
- Referee: Jeff Servinski
- TV announcers (ESPNews): Mike Couzens (play-by-play), Dan Hawkins (analyst)

Scoring summary
| 1 | 03:15 | WMU | Bogan, Jamauri 1 yd run (Hampton, Butch kick), 5 plays, 60 yards, TOP 1:44 | 7–0 WMU |
| 1 | 00:23 | WMU | Bogan, Jamauri 36 yd run (Hampton, Butch kick), 2 plays, 81 yards, TOP 0:44 | 14–0 WMU |
| 2 | 14:56 | WMU | Terrell, Zach 3 yd run (Hampton, Butch kick), 2 plays, 5 yards, TOP 0:14 | 21–0 WMU |
| 2 | 06:39 | ILL | Johnson, Ainslie 56 yd pass from Lunt, Wes (McLaughlin, C. kick) 3 plays, 74 yards, TOP 1:26 | 21–7 WMU |
| 2 | 01:14 | WMU | Hampton, Butch 32 yd field goal 11 plays, 65 yards, TOP 5:25 | 24–7 WMU |
| 3 | 10:36 | ILL | McLaughlin, C. 22 yd field goal 10 plays, 61 yards, TOP 4:24 | 24–10 WMU |
| 3 | 03:19 | WMU | Hampton, Butch 22 yd field goal 7 plays, 62 yards, TOP 2:52 | 27–10 WMU |
| 4 | 08:37 | WMU | Franklin, J 1 yd run (Hampton, Butch kick), 6 plays, 65 yards, TOP 3:14 | 34–10 WMU |

| Series record | Previous meeting | Result |
|---|---|---|
| ILL leads 4–2 | 2012 | 24–7, ILL |

Running back Jamauri Bogan scored two rushing touchdowns and kicker Butch Hampton booted two field goals to lift the Broncos to victory over their second Big Ten opponent of the season. It was the first win over Illinois since 2008.

=== Georgia Southern ===
Georgia Southern at Western Michigan

| Team | 1 | 2 | 3 | 4 | Total |
|---|---|---|---|---|---|
| Eagles | 7 | 10 | 7 | 7 | 31 |
| • Broncos | 7 | 28 | 7 | 7 | 49 |

- Date: September 24
- Location:
  Waldo Stadium
  Kalamazoo, MI
- Game start: 7:04 pm EDT
- Elapsed time: 3:15
- Game attendance: 17,208
- Game weather: Clear, 70º F
- Referee: Greg Blum
- Television network: ESPN3

Scoring summary
| 1 | 07:36 | WMU | BOGAN, Jamauri 4 yd run (Hampton, Butch kick), 10 plays, 56 yards, TOP 3:57 | 7–0 WMU |
| 1 | 04:02 | GS | W. Fields 44 yd pass from F. Upshaw (Y. Koo kick) 7 plays, 73 yards, TOP 3:34 | 7–7 TIE |
| 2 | 14:52 | WMU | HENRY, Michael 37 yd pass from Terrell, Zach (Hampton, Butch kick) 7 plays, 75 yards, TOP 4:10 | 14–7 WMU |
| 2 | 10:27 | GS | Y. Koo 34 yd field goal 9 plays, 40 yards, TOP 4:25 | 14–10 WMU |
| 2 | 10:14 | WMU | Phillips, D 100 yd kickoff return (Hampton Butch kick) | 21–10 WMU |
| 2 | 07:52 | WMU | Thompson C 8 yd pass from Terrell, Zach (Hampton, Butch kick) 5 plays, 20 yards, TOP 1:35 | 28–10 WMU |
| 2 | 03:11 | GS | M. Campbell 33 yd pass from F. Upshaw (Y. Koo kick) 9 plays, 83 yards, TOP 4:41 | 28–17 WMU |
| 2 | 01:35 | WMU | DAVIS, Corey 35 yd pass from Terrell, Zach (Hampton, Butch kick) 6 plays, 83 yards, TOP 1:36 | 35–17 WMU |
| 3 | 12:18 | WMU | Phillips, D 70 yd interception (Hampton, Butch kick) | 42–17 WMU |
| 3 | 02:07 | GS | M. Crockett 44 yd pass from K. Ellison (Y. Koo kick) 9 plays, 80 yards, TOP 4:11 | 42–24 WMU |
| 4 | 09:56 | GS | L. Ramsby 13 yd run (Y. Koo kick), 14 plays, 70 yards, TOP 5:19 | 42–31 WMU |
| 4 | 02:11 | WMU | Henry, Michael 7 yd pass from Terrell, Zach (Hampton, Butch kick) 15 plays, 87 yards, TOP 7:45 | 49–31 WMU |

| Series record | Previous meeting | Result |
|---|---|---|
| Tied 1–1 | 2015 | 43–17, GASO |

Darius Phillips' kickoff return touchdown and interception return touchdown helped stake the Broncos to a 42–17 lead as they eventually held on to win, 49–31, over non-conference opponent Georgia Southern.

=== Central Michigan ===
Western Michigan at Central Michigan

| Team | 1 | 2 | 3 | 4 | Total |
|---|---|---|---|---|---|
| • Broncos | 7 | 14 | 14 | 14 | 49 |
| Chippewas | 3 | 0 | 7 | 0 | 10 |

- Date: October 1
- Location:
  Kelly/Shorts Stadium
  Mount Pleasant, MI
- Game start: 7:00 p.m. EDT
- Elapsed time: 3:29
- Game attendance: 30,411
- Game weather: 61º F; cloudy with drizzle
- Referee: Greg Sujack
- TV announcers (CBSSN): Ben Holden (play-by-play), Jay Feely (analyst)

Scoring summary
| 1 | 09:16 | CMU | Eavey Brian 45 yd field goal 11 plays, 53 yards, TOP 5:44 | 3–0 CMU |
| 1 | 01:21 | WMU | Henry, Michael 6 yd pass from Terrell, Zach (Hampton, Butch kick) 13 plays, 74 yards, TOP 5:22 | 7–3 WMU |
| 2 | 08:09 | WMU | Franklin, J 34 yd run (Hampton, Butch kick), 2 plays, 43 yards, TOP 0:30 | 14–3 WMU |
| 2 | 00:58 | WMU | Franklin, J 1 yd run (Hampton, Butch kick), 14 plays, 66 yards, TOP 5:40 | 21–3 WMU |
| 3 | 14:52 | WMU | Davis, Corey 45 yd pass from Terrell, Zach (Hampton, Butch kick) 1 plays, 45 yards, TOP 0:08 | 28–3 WMU |
| 3 | 08:58 | WMU | Phillips, D 85 yd interception (Hampton, Butch kick) | 35–3 WMU |
| 3 | 04:02 | CMU | Chapman, Mark 37 yd pass from Rush, Cooper (Eavey, Brian kick) 9 plays, 80 yards, TOP 4:56 | 35–10 WMU |
| 4 | 13:27 | WMU | Davis, Corey 4 yd pass from Terrell, Zach (Hampton, Butch kick ) 10 plays, 81 yards, TOP 5:35 | 42–10 WMU |
| 4 | 02:37 | WMU | Johnson, Fabian 3 yd run (Hampton, Butch kick ), 12 plays, 95 yards, TOP 7:07 | 49–10 WMU |

| Series record | Previous meeting | Result |
|---|---|---|
| WMU leads 48–37–2 | 2015 | 41–39, WMU |

Western Michigan used a fast start that resulted in a 21–3 halftime lead to defeat the arch-rival Chippewas in Mount Pleasant, 49–10. The victory gave the Broncos their third straight victory in the series, their fifth victory in the past six meetings, and their third consecutive victory in Mount Pleasant (2012, 2014, 2016) after only having won there in 1965, 1970, 1973, and 2002 since WMU went Division I in 1962.

=== Northern Illinois ===
Northern Illinois at Western Michigan

| Team | 1 | 2 | 3 | 4 | Total |
|---|---|---|---|---|---|
| Huskies | 0 | 17 | 6 | 7 | 30 |
| • Broncos | 14 | 7 | 10 | 14 | 45 |

- Date: October 8
- Location:
  Waldo Stadium
  Kalamazoo, MI
- Game start: 6:35 p.m. EDT
- Elapsed time: 3:41
- Game attendance: 28.042
- Game weather: Clear, 56º F with 10 MPH wind
- Referee: Larry Smith
- TV announcers (CBSSN): Ben Holden (play-by-play), Jay Feely (analyst)

Scoring summary
| 1 | 12:42 | WMU | J Franklin 32 yard pass from Zach Terrell (Butch Hampton kick), 6 plays, 78 yards, TOP 2:18 | 7–0 WMU |
| 1 | 00:46 | WMU | Corey Davis 20 yard pass from Zach Terrell (Butch Hampton kick), 8 plays, 80 yards, TOP 3:03 | 14–0 WMU |
| 2 | 14:18 | NIU | Christian Blake 2 yard run (Christian Hagan kick), 5 plays, 70 yards TOP: 1:28 | 14–7 WMU |
| 2 | 10:05 | WMU | J Franklin 1 yard run (Butch Hampton kick), 9 plays 65 yards, TOP: 4:13 | 21–7 WMU |
| 2 | 06:09 | NIU | Shane Wimann 26 yard pass from Anthony Maddie (Christian Hagan kick), 9 plays 65 yards, TOP: 3:56 | 21–14 WMU |
| 2 | 03:01 | NIU | Christian Hagan 30 yard field goal, 7 plays, 55 yards, TOP: 2:09 | 21–17 WMU |
| 3 | 10:26 | NIU | Christian Hagan 19 yard field goal, 12 plays, 75 yards, TOP: 4:34 | 21–20 WMU |
| 2 | 05:21 | WMU | Butch Hampton 23 yard field goal, 11 plays, 84 yards, TOP: 5:05 | 24–20 WMU |
| 3 | 02:56 | NIU | Christian Hagan 37 yard field goal, 7 plays, 70 yards, TOP: 2:25 | 24–23 WMU |
| 3 | 00:22 | WMU | Corey Davis 8 yard pass from Zach Terrell (Butch Hampton kick), 5 plays, 69 yards, TOP: 2:34 | 31–23 WMU |
| 4 | 12:04 | WMU | Davon Tucker 26 yard run (Butch Hampton kick), 5 plays 87 yards, TOP: 2:10 | 38–23 WMU |
| 4 | 08:38 | NIU | Anthony Maddie 8 yard run (Christian Hagan kick), 9 plays, 62 yards, TOP: 3:26 | 38–30 WMU |
| 4 | 05:20 | WMU | Zach Terrel 2 yard run (Butch Hampton kick), 6 plays 86 yards, TOP: 3:18 | 45–30 WMU |

| Series record | Previous meeting | Result |
|---|---|---|
| WMU leads 24–18 | 2015 | 27–18, NIU |

Western Michigan beat Northern Illinois 45–30, to improve their record to 6–0 (2–0 MAC). With the win, the Broncos had beaten all three Illinois FBS teams in the same season—Northwestern, Illinois, and Northern Illinois.

=== Akron ===
Western Michigan at Akron

| Team | 1 | 2 | 3 | 4 | Total |
|---|---|---|---|---|---|
| • No. 24 Broncos | 14 | 13 | 7 | 7 | 41 |
| Zips | 0 | 0 | 0 | 0 | 0 |

- Date: October 15
- Location:
  InfoCision Stadium
  Akron, OH
- Game start: 3:32 p.m. EDT
- Elapsed time: 3:33
- Game attendance: 11,321
- Game weather: Sunny, 74º F with 12 MPH wind
- Referee: Curt Johnson
- TV announcers (CBSSN): John Sadak (play-by-play), Randy Cross (analyst)

Scoring summary
| 1 | 11:24 | WMU | Terrell, Zach 1 yd run (Hampton, Butch kick), 10 plays, 75 yards, TOP 3:36 | 7–0 WMU |
| 1 | 07:20 | WMU | FranklinN, J 3 yd run (Hampton, Butch kick), 7 plays, 64 yards, TOP 3:11 | 14–0 WMU |
| 2 | 14:28 | WMU | Davis, Corey 5 yd pass from Terrell, Zach (Hampton, Butch kick) 16 plays, 70 yards, TOP 6:48 | 21–0 WMU |
| 2 | 12:54 | WMU | Tucker, Davon 13 yd run (Hampton, Butch kick failed), 3 plays, 44 yards, TOP 0:39 | 27–0 WMU |
| 3 | 02:36 | WMU | Davis, Corey 17 yd pass from Terrell, Zach (Hampton, Butch kick) 8 plays, 95 yards, TOP 3:40 | 34–0 WMU |
| 4 | 04:58 | WMU | Terrell, Zach 2 yd run (Hampton, Butch kick), 17 plays, 92 yards, TOP 8:33 | 41–0 WMU |

| Series record | Previous meeting | Result |
|---|---|---|
| WMU leads 14–4 | 2011 | 68–19, WMU |

Western Michigan's first match-up against the Zips since 2011 was again a one-sided contest as the Broncos raced out to a 27–0 halftime lead en route to a 41–0 win over the East Division-leading Akron Zips. Corey Davis caught two touchdown passes and Jarvion Franklin set the school record for single game rushing with 281 yards on 33 attempts. Franklin added an 18-yard pass reception, giving him 299 all-purpose yards in the victory. Linebackers Caleb Bailey and Kasey Carson collected interceptions to help preserve the shutout.

=== Eastern Michigan ===
Eastern Michigan at Western Michigan

| Team | 1 | 2 | 3 | 4 | Total |
|---|---|---|---|---|---|
| Eagles | 7 | 10 | 7 | 7 | 31 |
| • No. 20 Broncos | 7 | 17 | 14 | 7 | 45 |

- Date: October 22
- Location:
  Waldo Stadium
  Kalamazoo, MI
- Game start: 3:36 p.m. EDT
- Elapsed time: 3:38
- Game attendance: 23,721
- Game weather: 56°F with clouds and 11 MPH wind
- Referee: Tim O'Dey
- TV announcers (ASN/ESPN3): Mike Gleason (play-by-play), Brad Jackson (analyst)

Scoring summary
| 1 | 9:02 | WMU | Carrington Thompson 32-yd pass from Zach Terrell (Butch Hampton kick) | 7–0 WMU |
| 1 | 1:35 | EMU | Brogan Roback 9-yd run (Paul Fricanokick) | 7–7 |
| 2 | 12:13 | WMU | Jarvion Franklin 2-yd run (Butch Hampton kick) | 14–7 WMU |
| 2 | 6:32 | EMU | Paul Fricano 36-yd field goal | 14–10 WMU |
| 2 | 3:35 | EMU | Antoine Porter 29-yd pass from Brogan Roback (Paul Fricano kick) | 17–14 EMU |
| 2 | 1:14 | WMU | Jamauri Bogan 6-yd run (Butch Hampton kick) | 21–17 WMU |
| 2 | 0:03 | WMU | Butch Hampton 44 yd field goal | 24–17 WMU |
| 3 | 6:27 | WMU | Carrington Thompson 8-yd pass from Zach Terrell (Butch Hampton kick) | 31–17 WMU |
| 3 | 5:16 | EMU | Breck Turner 9-yd run (Paul Fricano kick ) | 31–24 WMU |
| 3 | 1:12 | WMU | Corey Davis 31-yd pass from Zach Terrell (Butch Hampton kick) | 38–24 WMU |
| 4 | 7:55 | WMU | Jamauri Bogan 1-yd run (Butch Hampton kick) | 45–24 WMU |
| 4 | 3:21 | EMU | Willie Parker 2-yd run (Paul Fricano kick) | 45–31 WMU |

| Series record | Previous meeting | Result |
|---|---|---|
| WMU leads 32–18 | 2015 | 58–28, WMU |

Zach Terrell threw three touchdowns, two of them to Carrington Thompson, and for 398 yards as the Broncos held off a game Eastern Michigan team that would eventually qualify for its first bowl game since 1987.

=== Ball State ===
Western Michigan at Ball State

| Team | 1 | 2 | 3 | 4 | Total |
|---|---|---|---|---|---|
| • No. 17 Broncos | 21 | 7 | 14 | 10 | 52 |
| Cardinals | 7 | 3 | 3 | 7 | 20 |

- Date: November 1
- Location:
  Scheumann Stadium
  Muncie, IN
- Game start: 8:04 p.m. EDT
- Elapsed time: 3:29
- Game attendance: 5,614
- Game weather: Clear, 72º F with 10 MPH SSW wind
- Referee: Greg Blum
- Television network: ESPN2

| Series record | Previous meeting | Result |
|---|---|---|
| WMU leads 23–19 | 2015 | 54–7, WMU |

Corey Davis had a big game on national television with 12 receptions for 272 yards and three scores as the Broncos raced out to a 28–10 halftime lead and went on to win, 52–20.

=== Kent State ===
Western Michigan at Kent State

| Team | 1 | 2 | 3 | 4 | Total |
|---|---|---|---|---|---|
| • No. 14 Broncos | 3 | 10 | 8 | 16 | 37 |
| Golden Flashes | 14 | 0 | 0 | 7 | 21 |

- Date: November 8
- Location:
  Dix Stadium
  Kent, OH
- Game start: 7:35 p.m. EST
- Elapsed time: 3:23
- Game attendance: 4,536
- Game weather: Rain, 55º F with 8 MPH WSW wind
- Referee: Ron Hudson
- Television network: ESPN2

| Series record | Previous meeting | Result |
|---|---|---|
| WMU leads 33–20–1 | 2013 | 32–14, KENT |

Fabian Johnson rushed for a career-high 125 yards as the Broncos had to rally from a 14–0 deficit on the road to win, 37–21, at Dix Stadium, in a rainy Election Day contest on national television.

=== Buffalo ===
Buffalo at Western Michigan

| Team | 1 | 2 | 3 | 4 | Total |
|---|---|---|---|---|---|
| Bulls | 0 | 0 | 0 | 0 | 0 |
| • No. 14 Broncos | 0 | 14 | 10 | 14 | 38 |

- Date: November 19
- Location:
  Waldo Stadium
  Kalamazoo, MI
- Game start: 3:35 p.m. EDT
- Elapsed time: 3:00
- Game attendance: 26,136
- Game weather: Snow, 33º F with 20 MPH wind
- Referee: Curt Johnson
- Television network: ESPNU

| Series record | Previous meeting | Result |
|---|---|---|
| WMU leads 5–2 | 2013 | 33–0, BUFF |

Zach Terrell was the hero again for the Broncos, as he shredded the Bulls' defense for 445 yards passing in a 38–0 rout that was preceded by a visit from College Gameday for the first time in school history.

=== Toledo ===
Toledo at Western Michigan

| Team | 1 | 2 | 3 | 4 | Total |
|---|---|---|---|---|---|
| Rockets | 7 | 7 | 0 | 21 | 35 |
| • No. 14 Broncos | 14 | 10 | 21 | 10 | 55 |

- Date: November 25
- Location:
  Waldo Stadium
  Kalamazoo, MI
- Game start: 5:11 p.m. EST
- Elapsed time: 3:39
- Game attendance: 24,191
- Game weather: Cloudy/rainy, 39°F with 3 MPH SW wind
- Referee: Mark Kluczynski
- Television network: ESPN2

| Series record | Previous meeting | Result |
|---|---|---|
| TOL leads 41–29 | 2015 | 35–30, WMU |

Linebacker Asantay Brown scored on the game's first play from scrimmage with an interception return for a touchdown and Jamauri Bogan returned to form with 31 carries for 198 yards and a touchdown as the Broncos routed Toledo, 55–35, for the MAC West divisional title. Corey Davis also broke the Division I FBS career receiving yardage record in the win.

=== Ohio (MAC Championship Game) ===
Ohio vs Western Michigan

| Team | 1 | 2 | 3 | 4 | Total |
|---|---|---|---|---|---|
| Bobcats | 0 | 7 | 13 | 3 | 23 |
| • No. 13 Broncos | 6 | 17 | 3 | 3 | 29 |

- Date: December 2
- Location:
  Ford Field
  Detroit, MI
- Game start: 7:02 p.m. EST
- Elapsed time: 3:37
- Game attendance: 45,615
- Game weather: Indoors
- Referee: Greg Sujack
- TV announcers (ESPN2): Adam Amin (play-by-play), Mack Brown (analyst), Molly McGrath (sideline)

| Series record | Previous meeting | Result |
|---|---|---|
| WMU leads 32–28–1 | 2015 | 49–14, WMU |

Kicker Butch Hampton booted five field goals and linebacker Robert Spillane intercepted Ohio quarterback Greg Windham with 51 seconds remaining to deliver the first MAC championship to Kalamazoo since 1988. The Broncos finished the regular season 13–0 for the first time in school history with the victory.

=== Wisconsin (81st Cotton Bowl Classic) ===
Western Michigan vs Wisconsin

| Team | 1 | 2 | 3 | 4 | Total |
|---|---|---|---|---|---|
| No. 12 Broncos | 0 | 7 | 3 | 6 | 16 |
| • No. 8 Badgers | 14 | 3 | 0 | 7 | 24 |

- Date: January 2, 2017
- Location:
  AT&T Stadium
  Arlington, TX
- Game start: 12:01 p.m. CST
- Elapsed time: 3:04
- Game attendance: 59,615
- Game weather: Indoors
- Referee: Riley Johnson
- TV announcers (ESPN): Bob Wischusen (play-by-play), Brock Huard (analyst), Allison Williams (sideline reporter)

| Series record | Previous meeting | Result |
|---|---|---|
| WISC leads 4–1 | 2000 | 19–7, WISC |

The only blemish on Western Michigan's 2016 campaign came in the postseason as Dare Ogunbowale, Corey Clement, and Troy Fumagalli scored touchdowns for Wisconsin in a 24–16 defeat for the Broncos. Zach Terrell threw for a touchdown and ran for another in his final collegiate game. The touchdown pass went to Corey Davis, playing in his final collegiate game, as well.
