= 2017 Cotton Bowl Classic =

The 2017 Cotton Bowl Classic may refer to:

- 2017 Cotton Bowl Classic (January), American football game played as part of the 2016–17 college football bowl season between the Western Michigan Broncos and the Wisconsin Badgers
- 2017 Cotton Bowl Classic (December), American football game played as part of the 2017–18 college football bowl season between the USC Trojans and the Ohio State Buckeyes
