= Bart Houston =

American football player (born 1992)

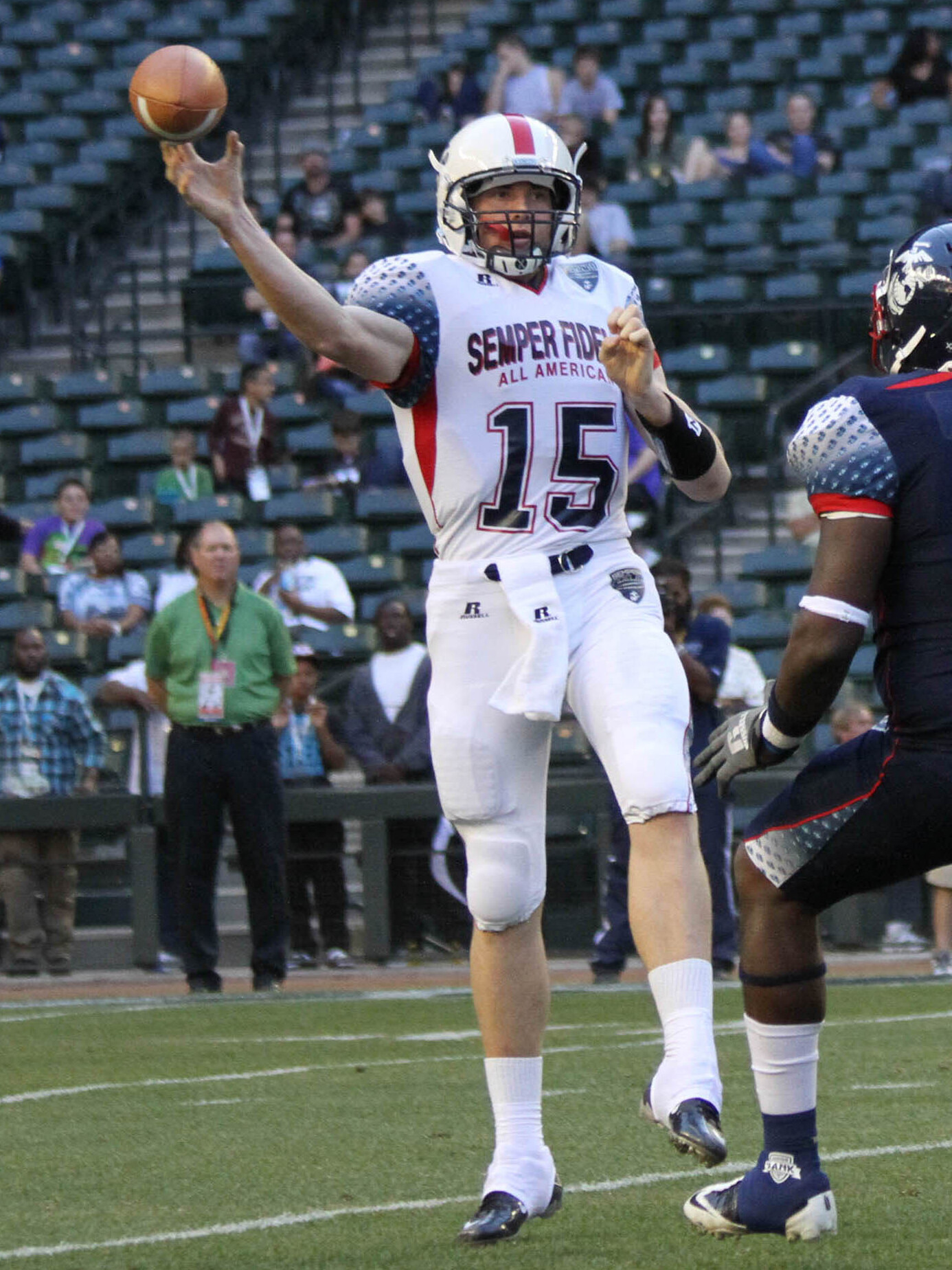
- Houston playing in the 2012 Semper Fidelis All-American Bowl

No. 13
- Position: Quarterback

Personal information
- Born: December 16, 1992 (age 33)
- Listed height: 6 ft 3 in (1.91 m)
- Listed weight: 234 lb (106 kg)

Career information
- High school: De La Salle (Concord, California)
- College: Wisconsin (2012–2016)
- NFL draft: 2017: undrafted

Career history
- Pittsburgh Steelers (2017)*
- * Offseason or practice squad member only
- Stats at Pro Football Reference

Bart Houston (born December 16, 1992) is an American former football player. A quarterback, he played high school football at De La Salle High School in Concord, California, winning three state titles and setting several school records. He played college football for the Wisconsin Badgers from 2012 to 2016. A backup for his first four seasons, Houston made his first career start in the 2016 season opener in a "historic" upset over No. 5 ranked LSU. In the 2017 Cotton Bowl Classic victory over Western Michigan, he tied a Cotton Bowl-record for completion percentage (91.7%). After going unselected in the 2017 NFL draft, he signed with the Pittsburgh Steelers and played for them during the preseason.

== Early life ==
Bart Houston was born on December 16, 1992. He was named after Green Bay Packers quarterback Bart Starr, who was his father's "hero". Houston played football and baseball growing up. He played high school football at De La Salle High School in Concord, California, as a quarterback and rugby-style punter. He helped the team win three straight state titles. As a sophomore, Houston completed 71 of 113 passes for 1,257 yards and 10 touchdowns while also rushing for 101 yards and one touchdown, earning ESPN CalPreps All-State Sophomore honors. His junior year, he recorded 102 completions on 153 passing attempts for 1,922 yards and 20 touchdowns while running for 236 yards and 11 touchdowns. Houston was named the Fox GoldenStatePreps California Junior Player of the Year and also garnered ESPN CalPreps All-State Junior recognition. He completed 99 of 171 passes for 1,999 yards and 16 touchdowns his senior year while also rushing for 338 yards and 19 touchdowns.

Houston finished his high school career with totals of 272 completions on 437 attempts (62.2 percent) for 5,178 yards and 46 touchdowns. Houston broke the school career records for completions and passing yards previously held by Matt Gutierrez. Houston was invited to the Elite 11 quarterback camp and the Semper Fidelis All-American Bowl. In the class of 2012, he was rated the No. 7 quarterback in the country by Scout.com, the No. 12 quarterback by Rivals.com, and the No. 15 quarterback by ESPN.com. He was also rated a four-star recruit by both Scout.com and ESPN.com, and a three-star recruit by Rivals.com.

== College career ==
Houston enrolled at the University of Wisconsin–Madison to play college football for the Wisconsin Badgers. He redshirted the 2012 season, then was a four-year letterman from 2013 to 2016. He was the third-string quarterback in 2013, behind backup Curt Phillips and starter Joel Stave. Houston played in two games during the 2013 season but only attempted one pass, a completion for eight yards. In 2014, he continued as the third-string quarterback behind Tanner McEvoy and Stave but also became a part-time rugby-style punter. Houston appeared in six games overall during the 2014 season, completing one of three passes for six yards and a touchdown while also punting seven times for 243 yards. He was promoted to second string behind starter Stave in 2015. Houston played in seven games during the 2015 season, completing 27 of 47 passes (57.4%) for 281 yards, three touchdowns, and two interceptions.

On August 25, 2016, head coach Paul Chryst announced that Houston would start the season opener on September 3 against LSU at Lambeau Field. Against No. 5 ranked LSU, Houston completed 19 of 31 passes (61.3%) for 205 yards and two interceptions as Wisconsin won 16–14 in what ESPN called a "historic upset". He started the team's next two games but was benched for Alex Hornibrook after only throwing for 91 yards against Georgia State. After Hornibrook suffered an injury, Houston started the 2016 Big Ten Football Championship Game against Penn State, completing 16 of 21 passes (76.2%) for 174 yards as Wisconsin lost 38–31. Houston earned the start over a healthy Hornibook in the 2017 Cotton Bowl Classic against Western Michigan. Houston completed 11 of 12 passes for 159 yards as Wisconsin won 24–16. His 91.7 completion percentage tied the Cotton Bowl record. He played in 11 games, starting five, overall during the 2016 season, recording 96 completions on 141 attempts (68.1%) for 1,245 yards, five touchdowns, and three interceptions. He majored in kinesiology at Wisconsin. Houston earned Academic All-Big Ten honors each year from 2013 to 2016. He finished his college career with totals of 125 completions on 192 attempts (65.1%) for 1,540 yards, nine touchdowns, and five interceptions.

== Professional career ==
After going unselected in the 2017 NFL draft, Houston signed with the Pittsburgh Steelers on May 17, 2017. Through training camp and the preseason, he served as Pittsburgh's fourth-string quarterback behind Joshua Dobbs, Landry Jones, and Ben Roethlisberger. Houston played in two preseason games for the Steelers, completing seven of 16 passes (43.8%) for 48 yards, one touchdown, and one interception while also rushing four times for negative two yards. His touchdown pass was a six-yarder to Justin Hunter with six minutes left in the game to help the Steelers beat the Atlanta Falcons 17–13. Houston was released on September 2, 2017, before the start of the regular season.

== Personal life ==
Houston is an Eagle Scout. His brother, Sumner Houston, played college football for the Oregon State Beavers from 2014 to 2018. His grandfather, Fred Houston, played college football for the Fresno State Bulldogs from 1951 to 1954. Bart's father, Guy Houston, played football and baseball at Saint Mary's College of California from 1978 to 1982. Guy was also a member of the California State Assembly and the mayor of Dublin, California.
