= Zach Terrell =

American football player (born 1993)

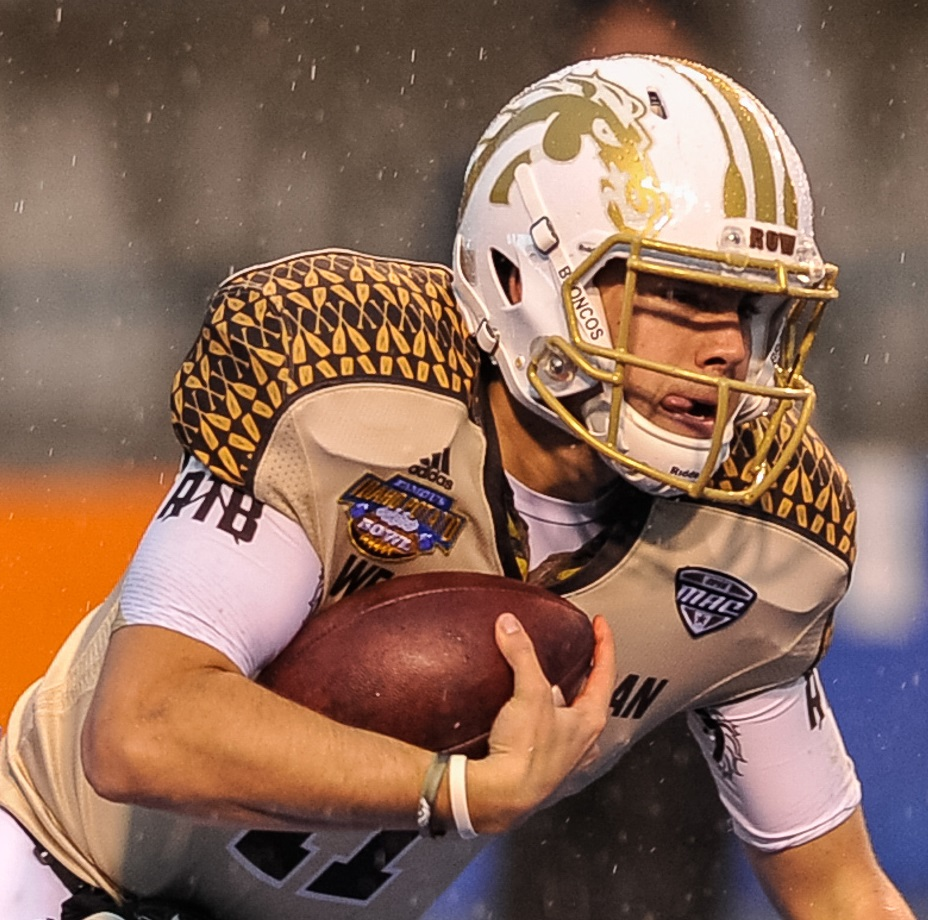
- Terrell in the 2014 Famous Idaho Potato Bowl.

Profile
- Position: Quarterback

Personal information
- Born: May 1, 1993 (age 33); Fort Wayne, Indiana, U.S.
- Listed height: 6 ft 1 in (1.85 m)
- Listed weight: 210 lb (95 kg)

Career information
- High school: Homestead (Fort Wayne, Indiana)
- College: Western Michigan (2012–2016)
- NFL draft: 2017: undrafted

Career history
- Baltimore Ravens (2017)*
- * Offseason or practice squad member only

Awards and highlights
- Second-team All-MAC (2014, 2016); Third-team All-MAC (2015); MAC Most Valuable Player (2016); William V. Campbell Trophy (2016)
- Stats at Pro Football Reference

Zachary Steven Terrell (born May 1, 1993) is an American former professional football quarterback. He played college football for the Western Michigan Broncos where he won the William V. Campbell Trophy his senior year. He signed with the Baltimore Ravens as an undrafted free agent after the 2017 NFL draft.

== Early life ==
Terrell attended Homestead High School in Fort Wayne, Indiana. During his career, he passed for 6,940 yards and 89 touchdowns. He committed to Western Michigan University to play college football.

== College career ==
After redshirting his first year at Western Michigan in 2012, Terrell completed 133 of 251 passes for 1,602 yards with eight touchdowns and eight interceptions as a redshirt freshman in 2013.

As a 13-game starter in 2014, he completed 250 of 368 passes for 3,443 yards, 26 touchdowns, and 10 interceptions.

He again started all 13 games his junior year in 2015, completing 262 of 391 for 3,522 yards, 29 touchdowns, and 9 interceptions, leading the Broncos to an 8–5 record and the program's first-ever bowl victory over Middle Tennessee in the Popeyes Bahamas Bowl. Terrell completed his BBA in finance cum laude in December 2015.

Also beginning coursework for an MBA, Terrell returned as a starter his senior year in 2016, where he threw 34 touchdowns to 4 interceptions, the best TD/INT ratio in the FBS. During the season, he broke Tim Hiller's school record for career passing yards. In 2016, Terrell led his Broncos to an undefeated 13–0 regular season, a Mid-American Conference championship, and a berth to the 2017 Cotton Bowl, where they lost to Wisconsin 24–16 in Terrell's final college game.

== Professional career ==
Pre-draft measurables
Height	Weight	Arm length	Hand span	40-yard dash	10-yard split	20-yard split	20-yard shuttle	Three-cone drill	Vertical jump	Broad jump
6 ft 1 1/4 in (1.86 m)	212 lb (96 kg)	30 3/4 in (0.78 m)	9 5/8 in (0.24 m)	5.02 s	1.68 s	2.82 s	4.41 s	7.36 s	28.5 in (0.72 m)	8 ft 7 in (2.62 m)
All values from Pro Day

Terrell signed with the Baltimore Ravens as an undrafted free agent on May 5, 2017. He was waived by the Ravens on May 8, 2017.

== Post-football career ==
Terrell now works in business development for Zeigler Auto Group in Kalamazoo, MI.
