= 2017 Cotton Bowl Classic (January) =

2017 Goodyear Cotton Bowl Classic
- CFP New Year’s Six; 81st Cotton Bowl Classic
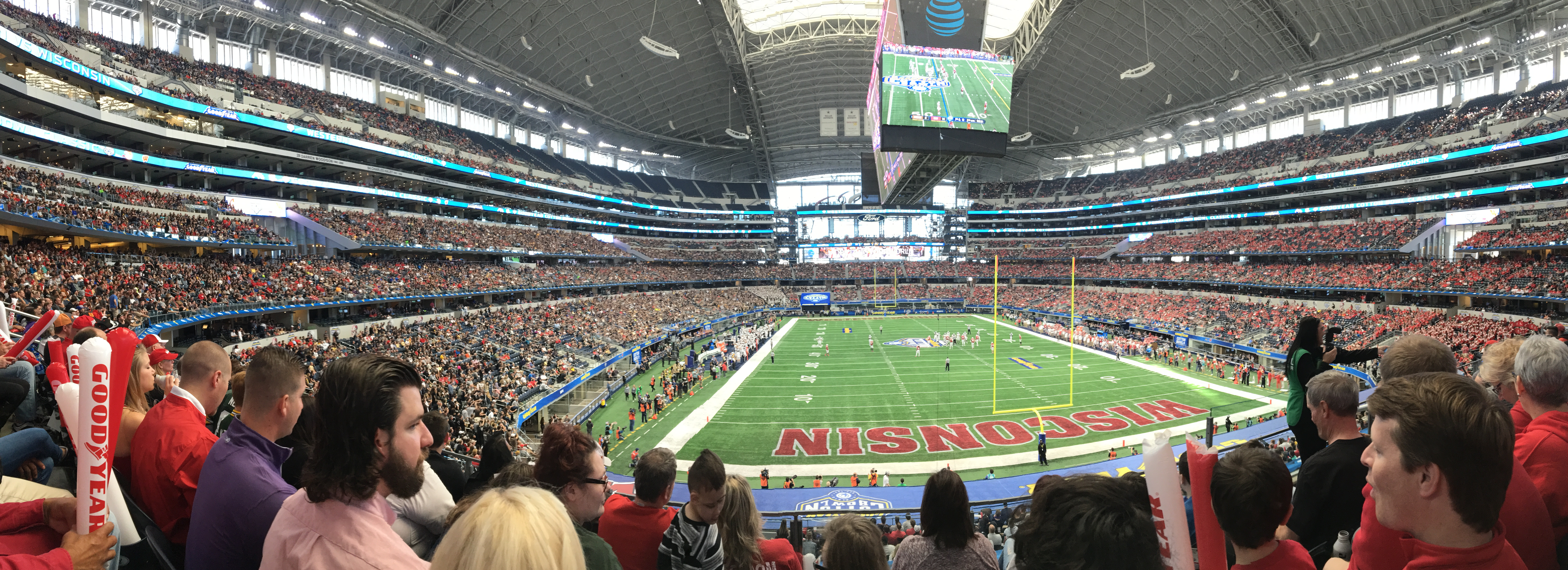
- AT&T Stadium during the Cotton Bowl Classic between the Western Michigan Broncos and the Wisconsin Badgers.
Western Michigan Broncos	Wisconsin Badgers
(13–0)	(10–3)
MAC	Big Ten
16	24
Head coach: P. J. Fleck	Head coach: Paul Chryst
AP / Coaches / CFP; 12 / 15 / 15	AP / Coaches / CFP; 8 / 8 / 8
	1	2	3	4	Total
Western Michigan	0	7	3	6	16
Wisconsin	14	3	0	7	24
- Date: January 2, 2017
- Season: 2016
- Stadium: AT&T Stadium
- Location: Arlington, Texas
- MVP: Offense: Troy Fumagalli (TE, WIS); Defense: T. J. Edwards (LB, WIS)
- Favorite: Wisconsin by 8.5
- Referee: Riley Johnson (ACC)
- Attendance: 59,615

United States TV coverage
- Network: ESPN
- Announcers: Bob Wischusen, Brock Huard and Allison Williams (ESPN)

The 2017 Cotton Bowl Classic was a college football bowl game played on January 2, 2017, at AT&T Stadium in Arlington, Texas. It featured the Western Michigan Broncos from the Mid-American Conference and the Wisconsin Badgers from the Big Ten Conference. The 81st Cotton Bowl Classic was one of the New Years Six bowl games in the College Football Playoff for the 2016–17 bowl games concluding the 2016 FBS football season.

The game was broadcast on ESPN, ESPN Deportes, ESPN Radio and XM Satellite Radio. It was sponsored by the Goodyear Tire and Rubber Company and was officially known as the Goodyear Cotton Bowl Classic.

== Teams ==
Mid-American Conference (MAC) champion Western Michigan was selected as an at-large as the highest ranked College Football Playoff (CFP) Group of Five team while Wisconsin was chosen as an at-large out of the Big Ten Conference. Wisconsin was an 8 1/2 point favorite to start the game.

This was the fifth meeting between the schools, with Wisconsin leading the all-time series 4–1. The most recent meeting was on August 31, 2000, where the Badgers defeated the Broncos by a score of 19–7. This was the first Cotton Bowl for both teams.

With Western Michigan representing the MAC, this was the first Cotton Bowl Classic to feature a MAC team.

== Game summary ==
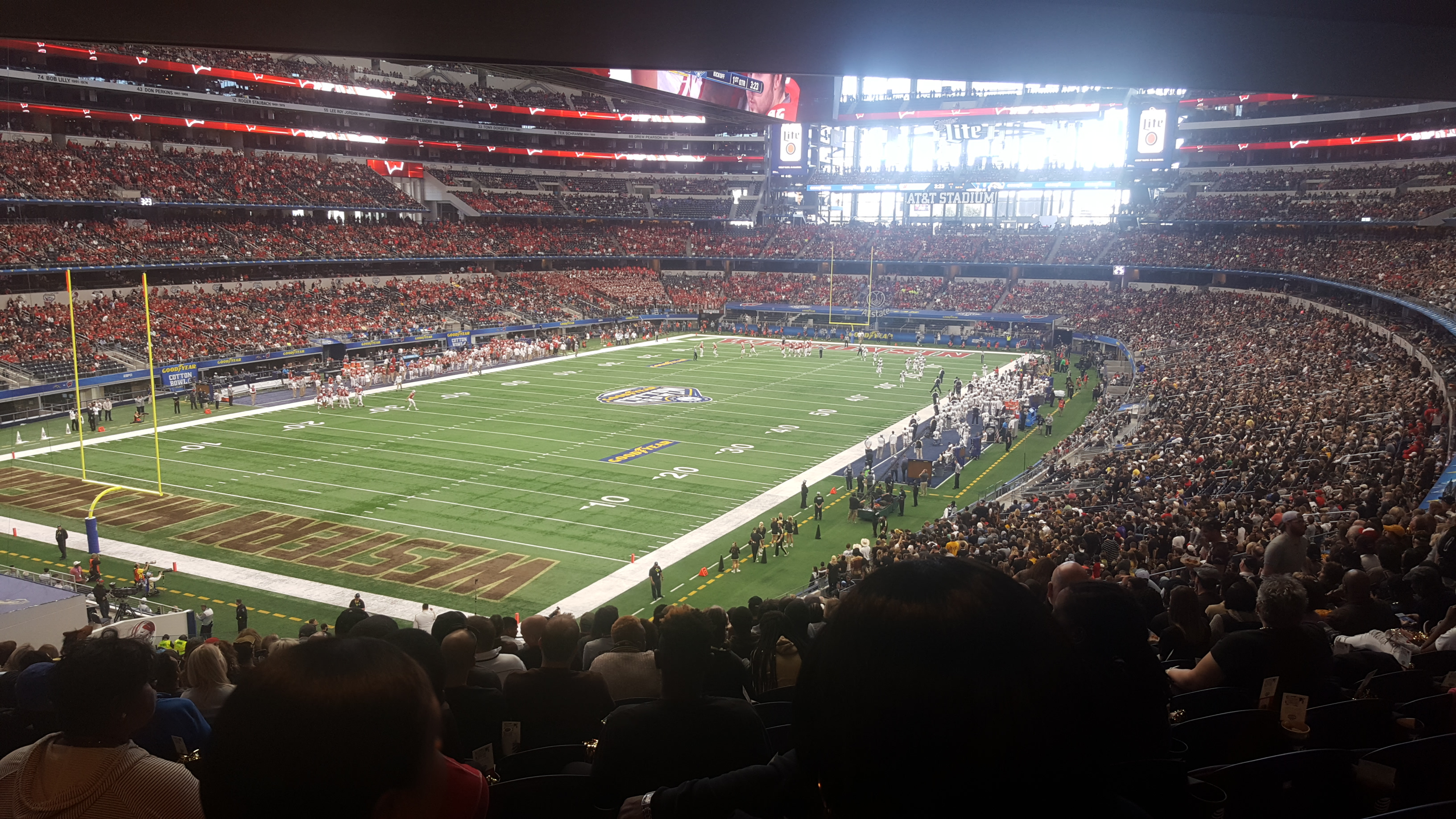
Near the end of the first quarter, the Wisconsin Badgers prepare to kick off the football to the Western Michigan University Broncos.

=== Scoring summary ===
Scoring summary

Quarter	Time	Drive			Team	Scoring information	Score	
Quarter	Time	Plays	Yards	TOP	Team	Scoring information	WMU	WIS
1	8:58	11	75	6:08	WIS	Corey Clement 2-yard touchdown run, Andrew Endicott kick good	0	7
1	3:23	7	88	3:52	WIS	Dare Ogunbowale 1-yard touchdown run, Andrew Endicott kick good	0	14
2	5:27	16	65	8:46	WMU	Zach Terrell 2-yard touchdown run, Butch Hampton kick good	7	14
2	0:18	9	63	5:09	WIS	30-yard field goal by Andrew Endicott	7	17
3	10:00	11	65	5:00	WMU	27-yard field goal by Butch Hampton	10	17
4	12:26	3	12	1:26	WIS	Troy Fumagalli 8-yard touchdown reception from Alex Hornibrook, Andrew Endicott kick good	10	24
4	3:27	16	75	8:59	WMU	Corey Davis 11-yard touchdown reception from Zach Terrell, Butch Hampton kick failed	16	24
"TOP" = time of possession. For other American football terms, see Glossary of American football.							16	24

=== Statistics ===
Statistics	Western Michigan	Wisconsin
First downs	18	18
Plays-yards	59-280	52-362
Third down efficiency	5–11	7–11
Rushes-yards	31-123	38-184
Passing yards	157	178
Passing, Comp-Att-Int	16-28-1	13-14-0
Time of Possession	29:55	30:05

Team	Category	Player	Statistics
Western Michigan	Passing	Zach Terrell	16–28, 157 YDS, 1 TD, 1 INT
Western Michigan	Rushing	Jamauri Bogan	16 CAR, 58 YDS
Western Michigan	Receiving	Corey Davis	6 REC, 73 YDS, 1 TD
Wisconsin	Passing	Bart Houston	11–12, 159 YDS
Wisconsin	Rushing	Corey Clement	22 CAR, 71 YDS, 1 TD
Wisconsin	Receiving	Troy Fumagalli	6 REC, 83 YDS, 1 TD
