= Jon Dietzen =

American football player (born 1996)

No. 67
- Position: Guard

Personal information
- Born: December 30, 1996 (age 29); Black Creek, Wisconsin, U.S.
- Listed height: 6 ft 6 in (1.98 m)
- Listed weight: 319 lb (145 kg)

Career information
- High school: Seymour Community (Seymour, Wisconsin)
- College: Wisconsin (2015–2018, 2020)
- NFL draft: 2021: undrafted

Career history
- Green Bay Packers (2021)*; Pittsburgh Maulers (2022–2023)
- * Offseason or practice squad member only
- Stats at Pro Football Reference

Jon Dietzen (born December 30, 1996) is an American former football guard who played college football for the Wisconsin Badgers and professional football for the Pittsburgh Maulers.

== Early life ==
Dietzen attended Seymour Community High School. He was a two-time first-team all-state, won the Joe Thomas Award for top offensive lineman of the state of Wisconsin and Bay Conference Lineman of the Year. He also played hockey in high school. Coming out of high school, Dietzen was rated as a four-star recruit and held 13 offers which include offers from Nebraska, Michigan State, Miami (Fla.), Illinois, Iowa State, Western Michigan and Wisconsin. In May 2014, he committed in to play college football for the Wisconsin Badgers.

== College career ==
He redshirted his first season. He was a letterman in 2016 after playing 10 games of which he started eight playing as a left guard. He missed four games due to an injury. In his second year he played 13 games while starting 12, he was again a letterman. In the 2018 season he played 12 games in which he started all, he was for a third time a letterman and played this season as a left tackle.

He retired after the season in February 2019 due to injuries and didn't play in the 2019 season. He came back for the 2020 season in which he started all seven games. He earned for a fourth time his letter and graduated with a bachelor's degree in life sciences communication.

== Professional career ==
After going undrafted in the 2021 NFL draft, McCloud signed as an undrafted free agent with the Green Bay Packers. He was cut on August 16, 2021, together with punter Ryan Winslow. In 2022 he was chosen in the 2022 USFL draft in the 23th round as pick 190 by the Pittsburgh Maulers. He played with the Maulers the 2022 (special teams) and 2023 season in which he played nine games and started seven as a guard. He resigned with them for the 2024 season but the Maulers where folded after the USFL and XFL merger.
