= Troy Fumagalli =

American football player (born 1995)

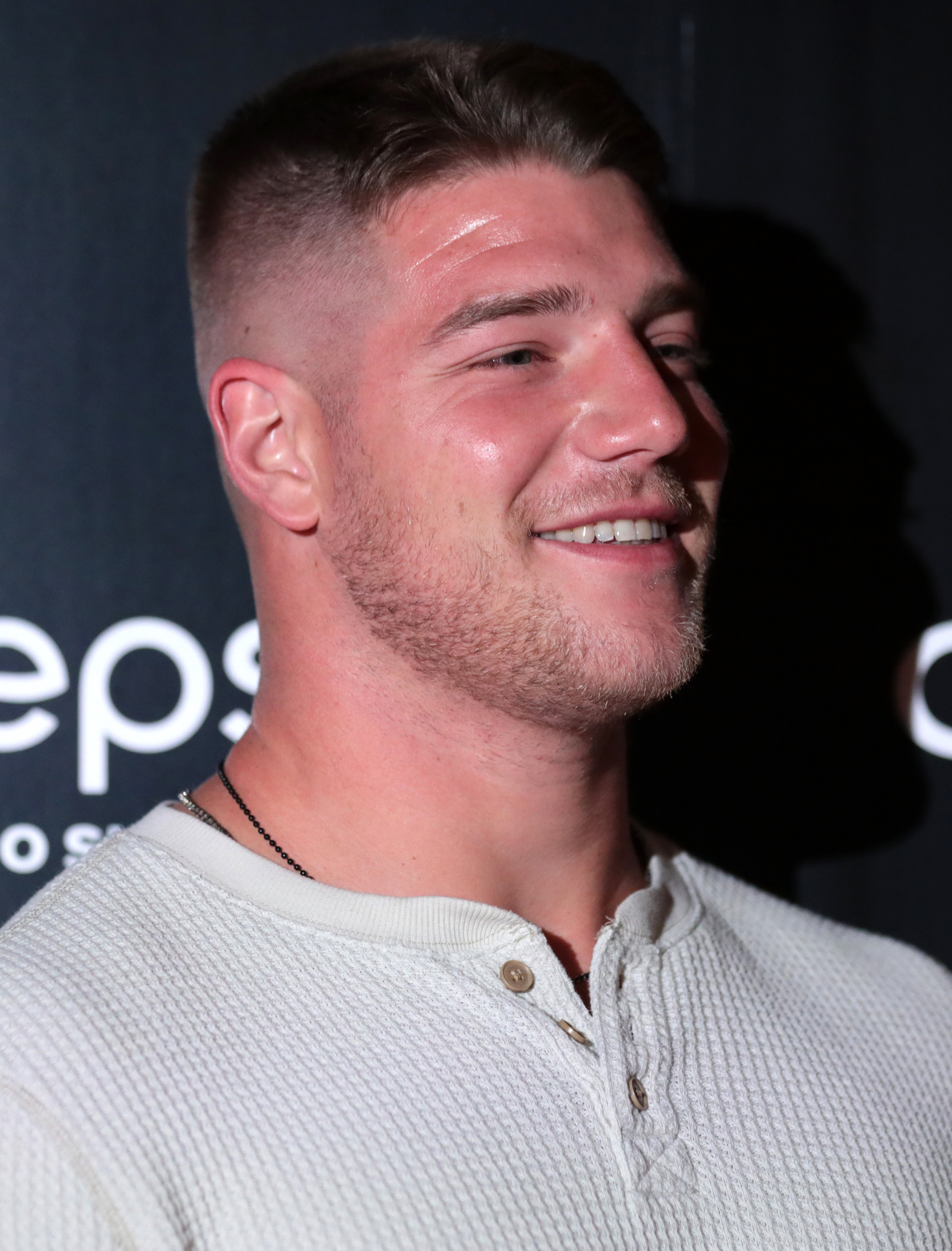
- Fumagalli in 2023

No. 84
- Position: Tight end

Personal information
- Born: February 17, 1995 (age 31); Aurora, Illinois, U.S.
- Listed height: 6 ft 5 in (1.96 m)
- Listed weight: 248 lb (112 kg)

Career information
- High school: Waubonsie Valley (Aurora)
- College: Wisconsin (2013–2017)
- NFL draft: 2018: 5th round, 156th overall pick

Career history
- Denver Broncos (2018–2019); Houston Texans (2020)*; Denver Broncos (2020); New England Patriots (2021); San Francisco 49ers (2022–2023)*; Minnesota Vikings (2023)*
- * Offseason or practice squad member only

Awards and highlights
- All-American (2017); Big Ten Tight End of the Year (2017); First-team All-Big Ten (2017); Second-team All-Big Ten (2016); Cotton Bowl Classic MVP (2017)

Career NFL statistics
- Receptions: 14
- Receiving yards: 118
- Receiving touchdowns: 2
- Stats at Pro Football Reference

Troy Fumagalli (born February 17, 1995) is an American former professional football player who was a tight end in the National Football League (NFL). He played college football for the Wisconsin Badgers.

== Early life ==
Fumagalli was born with amniotic band constriction, which forced doctors to amputate part of his left index finger a few days after he was born. He attended Waubonsie Valley High School in Aurora, Illinois. During his career, he had 172 tackles and four sacks on defense and 64 receptions for 1,770 yards on offense. He committed to the University of Wisconsin–Madison to play college football.

== College career ==
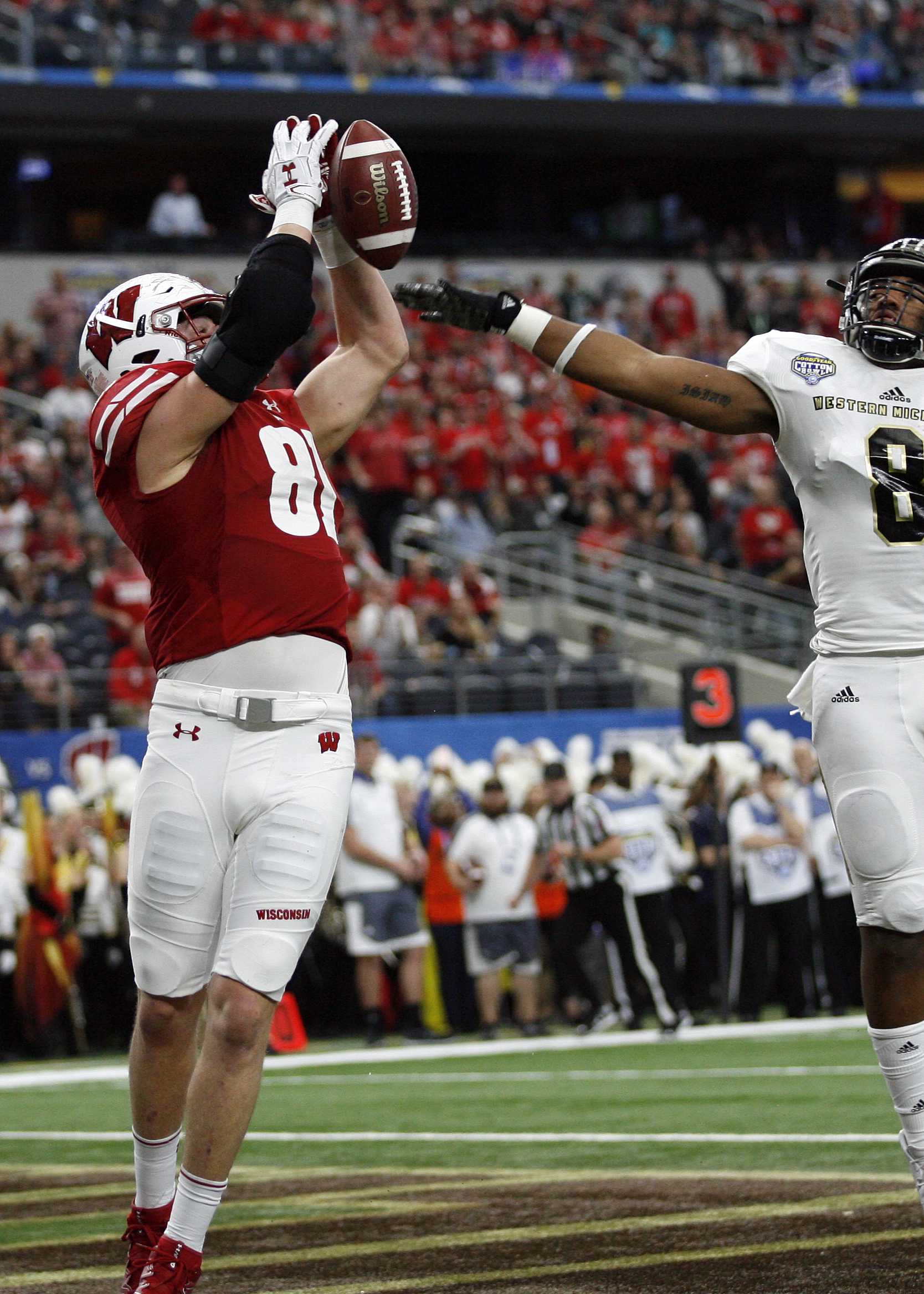
Fumagalli with Wisconsin in 2017

After redshirting his first year with the Badgers in 2013, Fumagalli appeared in all 14 games, with two starts, in 2014. He finished the season with 14 receptions for 187 yards. As a sophomore in 2015, he played in 11 games with four starts and had 28 receptions for 313 yards and one touchdown. As a junior in 2016, Fumagalli had 47 receptions for 580 yards and two touchdowns. He was named the Offensive MVP of the 2017 Cotton Bowl Classic after recording six receptions for 83 yards and a touchdown. As a senior in 2017, Fumagalli had 46 receptions for 547 yards and four touchdowns.

== Professional career ==
Pre-draft measurables
Height	Weight	Arm length	Hand span	Bench press
6 ft 4 3/4 in (1.95 m)	247 lb (112 kg)	32 1/8 in (0.82 m)	10 1/4 in (0.26 m)	14 reps
All values from NFL Combine

=== Denver Broncos (first stint) ===
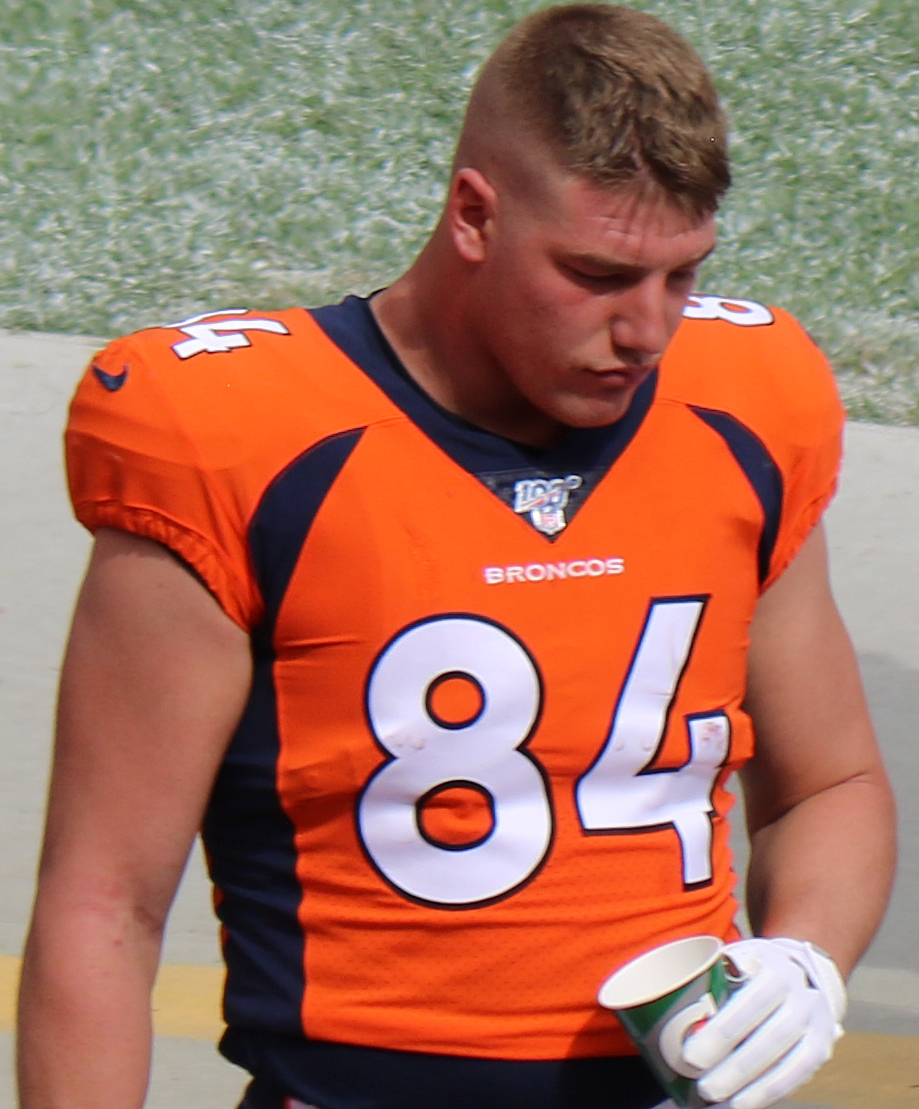
Fumagalli with the Denver Broncos in 2019

Fumagalli was selected by the Denver Broncos in the fifth round with the 156th overall pick in the 2018 NFL draft. He was placed on injured reserve on September 1, 2018. Fumagalli recorded his first NFL touchdown in a 27–23 loss to the Minnesota Vikings in Week 11 of the 2019 season.

On September 5, 2020, Fumagalli was waived/injured by the Broncos, and subsequently reverted to the team's injured reserve list the next day. He was waived with an injury settlement on September 8.

=== Houston Texans ===
On September 14, 2020, Fumagalli was signed to the practice squad of the Houston Texans. He was released on October 27.

=== Denver Broncos (second stint) ===
On November 9, 2020, the Broncos signed Fumagalli to their practice squad. He was elevated to the active roster on November 14, November 21, November 28, and December 5 for the team's weeks 10, 11, 12, and 13 games against the Las Vegas Raiders, Miami Dolphins, New Orleans Saints, and Kansas City Chiefs, and reverted to the practice squad after each game. He was promoted to the active roster on December 12. In Week 14 against the Carolina Panthers, Fumagalli had the most productive game of his professional career, catching four passes for 53 yards in a 32–27 Broncos win.

=== New England Patriots ===
On May 27, 2021, Fumagalli signed with the New England Patriots. He was waived/injured on August 17 and placed on injured reserve.

=== San Francisco 49ers ===
On May 17, 2022, Fumagalli signed with the San Francisco 49ers. He was released on August 30, 2022. He was signed to the practice squad on September 7, 2022. He was released on November 7, 2022.

On May 8, 2023, Fumagalli was re-signed by the 49ers. He was waived on August 29, 2023, and re-signed to the practice squad. He was released on September 26.

=== Minnesota Vikings ===
On October 10, 2023, the Vikings hosted Fumagalli for a workout. The next day, the Vikings signed Fumagalli to their practice squad. His contract expired when the teams season ended January 7, 2024.
