= 2017 NFL draft =

2017 American football draft

General information
- Date: April 27–29, 2017
- Time: 8:00 p.m. ET
- Location: Philadelphia Museum of Art on the Rocky Steps; Philadelphia, Pennsylvania
- Networks: ESPN, ESPN2, NFL Network

Overview
- 253 total selections in 7 rounds
- League: NFL
- First selection: Myles Garrett, DE; Cleveland Browns
- Mr. Irrelevant: Chad Kelly, QB; Denver Broncos
- Most selections (11): Cincinnati Bengals; Minnesota Vikings; Seattle Seahawks
- Fewest selections (4): New England Patriots

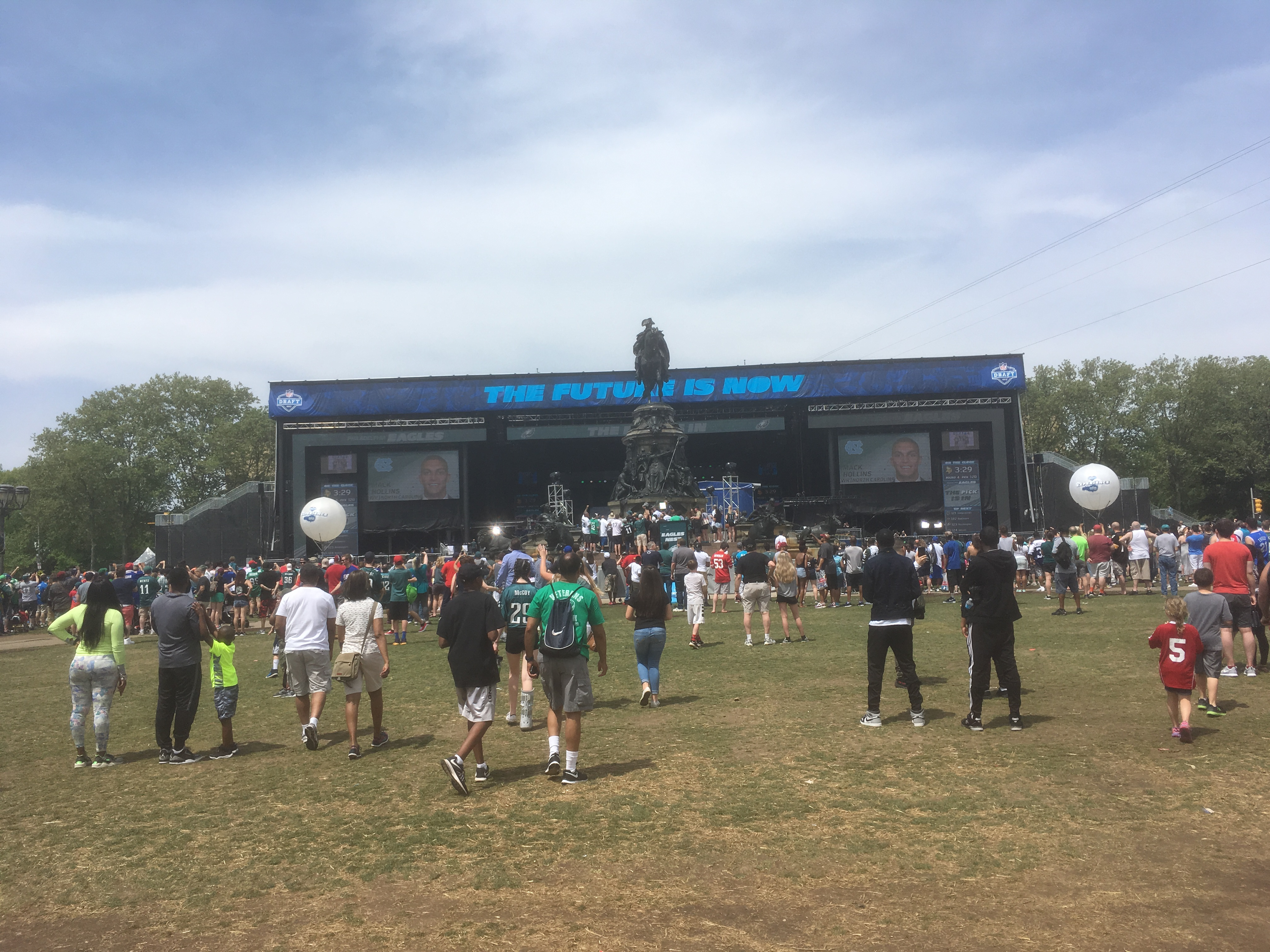
The stage for the 2017 NFL draft on Eakins Oval in front of the Philadelphia Museum of Art

The 2017 NFL draft was the 82nd annual meeting of National Football League (NFL) franchises to select newly eligible American football players. It was held in front of the Philadelphia Museum of Art on April 27–29, returning to Philadelphia for the first time since 1961.

The player selections were announced from an outdoor theater built on the Rocky Steps, marking the first time an entire NFL draft was held outdoors. The NFL announced that the draft was the most attended in history, with more than 250,000 people present. Starting with this draft, compensatory picks could be traded. The record for most trades made during an NFL draft was set this year at 37, surpassing the 34 trades made in the 2008 NFL draft. The number of trades was surpassed in 2019, when 40 trades were made.

== Early entrants ==
The deadline for underclassmen to declare for the draft was January 2, 2017.

== Player selections ==
The following is the breakdown of the 253 players selected by position:

- 34 cornerbacks
- 32 wide receivers
- 29 linebackers
- 26 running backs
- 26 defensive ends
- 23 safeties
- 20 defensive tackles
- 16 offensive tackles
- 14 tight ends
- 11 guards
- 10 quarterbacks
- 6 centers
- 3 placekickers
- 3 fullbacks
- 1 long snapper

*	Compensatory selection
†	Pro Bowler (Note: Players are identified as a Pro Bowler if they were selected for the Pro Bowl at any time in their career.)

Positions key
Offense	Defense	Special teams
QB — Quarterback; RB — Running back; FB — Fullback; WR — Wide receiver; TE — Tight end; OL — Offensive lineman; T — Tackle; G — Guard; C — Center	DL — Defensive lineman; DT — Defensive tackle (Note: Includes nose tackle (NT)); DE — Defensive end; EDGE — Edge rusher; LB — Linebacker (Note: Includes middle linebacker (MLB/MIKE), weakside linebacker (WILL), strongside linebacker (SAM), off-ball linebacker, and outside linebacker (OLB)); DB — Defensive back; CB — Cornerback; S — Safety (Note: Includes free safety (FS) and strong safety (SS))	K — Kicker (Note: Also known as a placekicker (PK)); P — Punter; LS — Long snapper; RS — Return specialist (Note: Includes kickoff and punt returners)

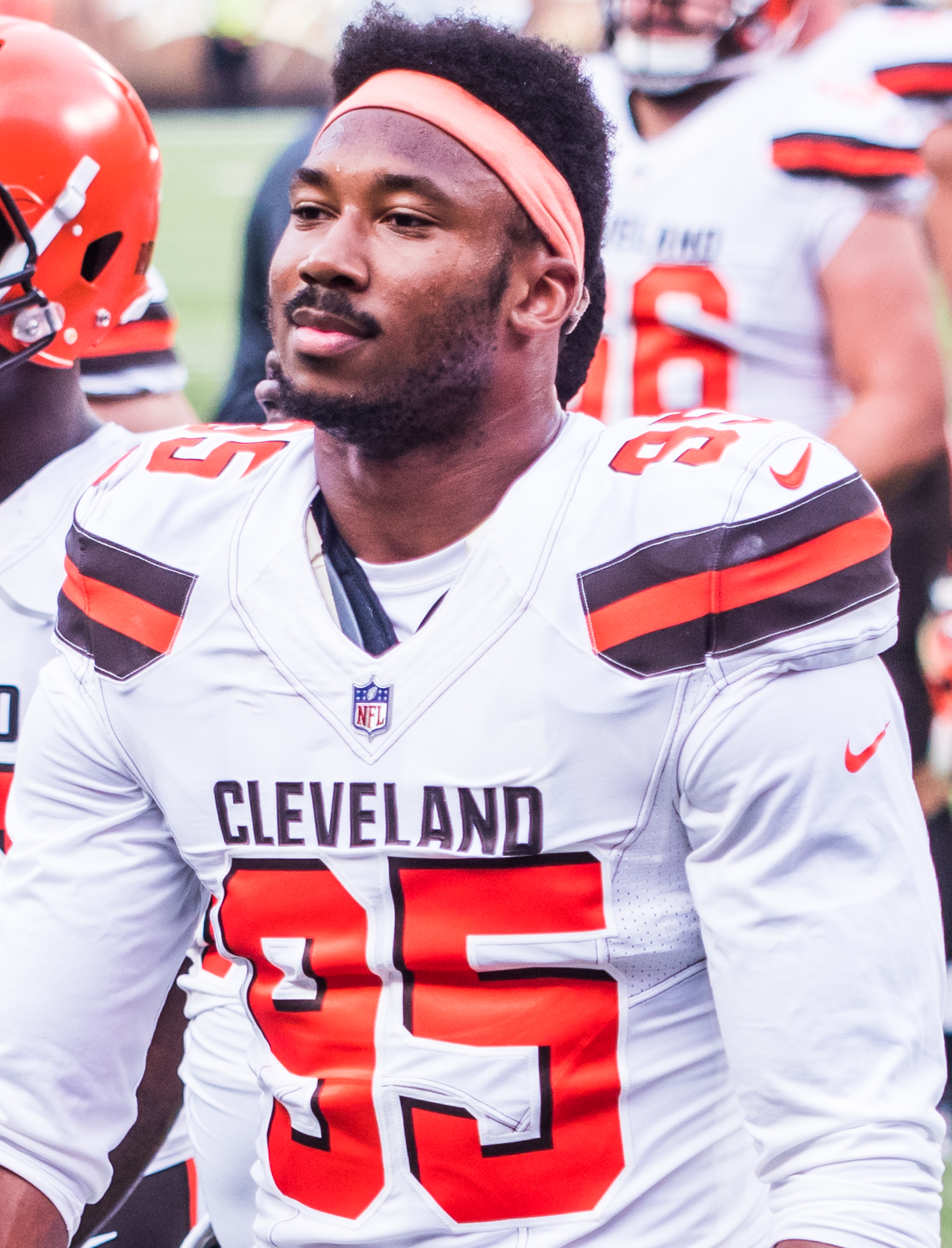
First overall pick Myles Garrett won the 2023 and 2025 Defensive Player of the Year award and holds the record for most sacks (23) in a single NFL season; he has earned six All Pro selections and been selected to seven Pro Bowls.

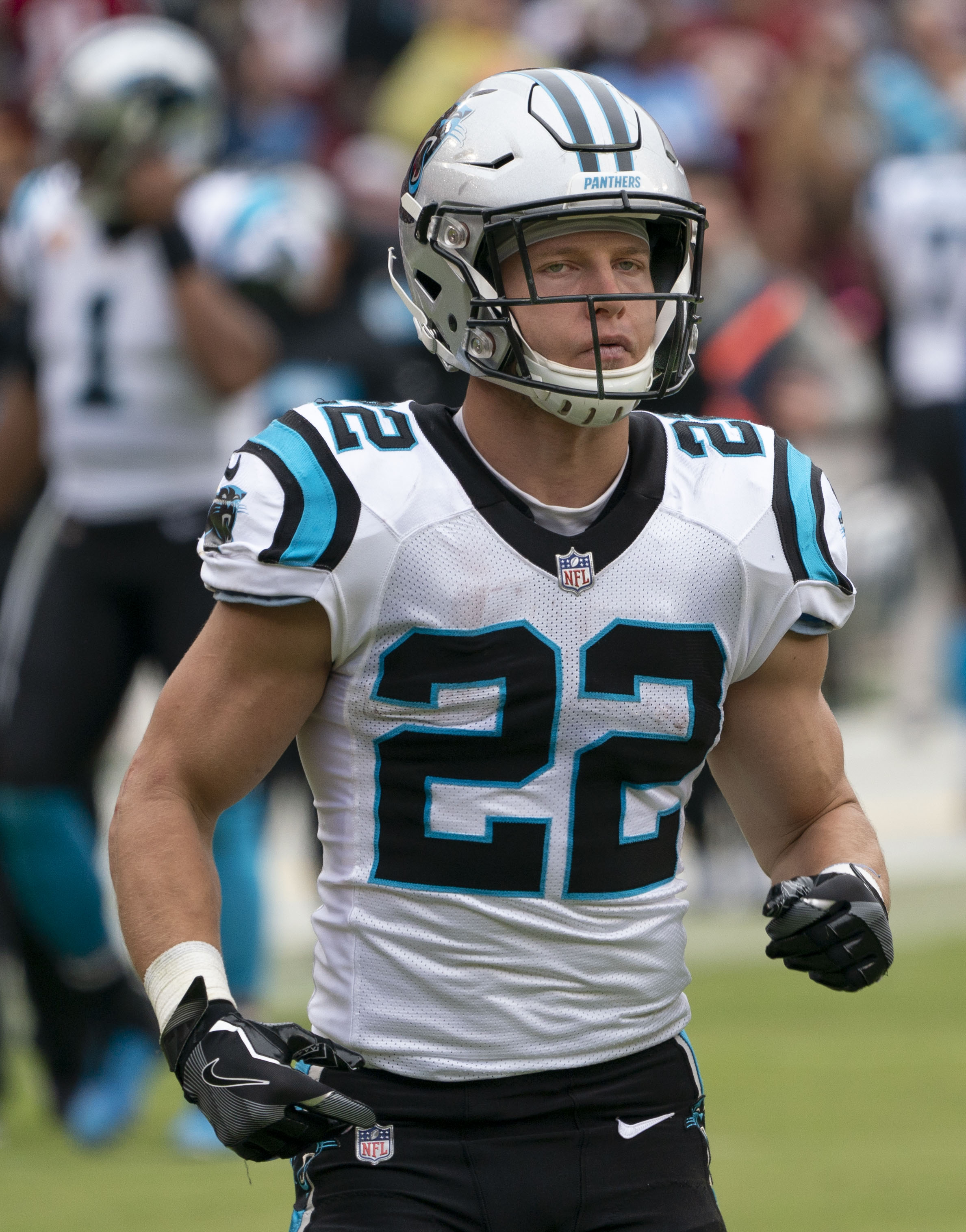
Running back Christian McCaffrey, taken 8th overall by Carolina, broke several NFL and franchise all-purpose yards records before being traded to San Francisco

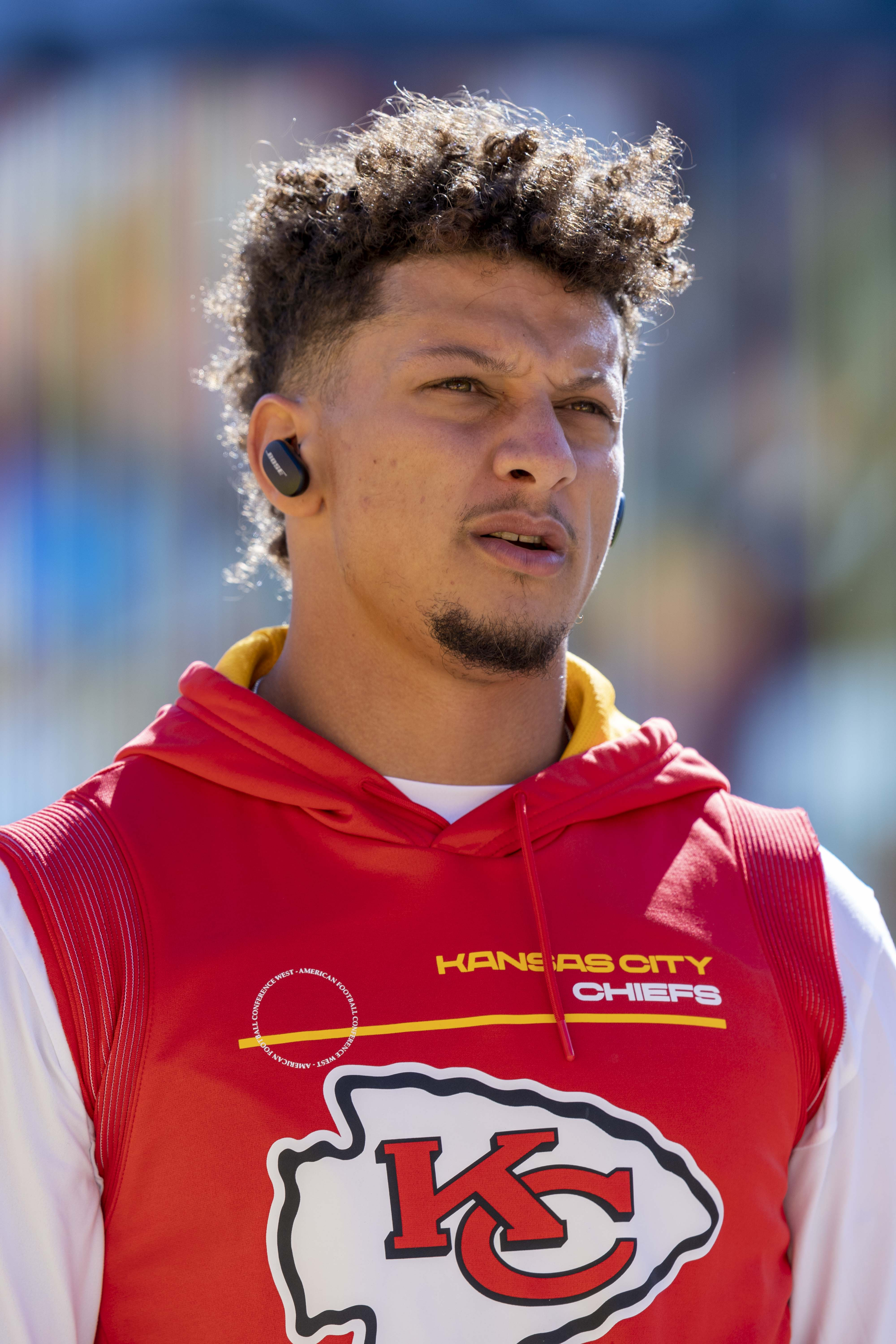
Kansas City Chiefs quarterback Patrick Mahomes has won two NFL MVP awards, five AFC Championships and three Super Bowls. He has been named Super Bowl MVP three times in the seven NFL seasons he has played; he was drafted 10th overall in the 2017 NFL draft.

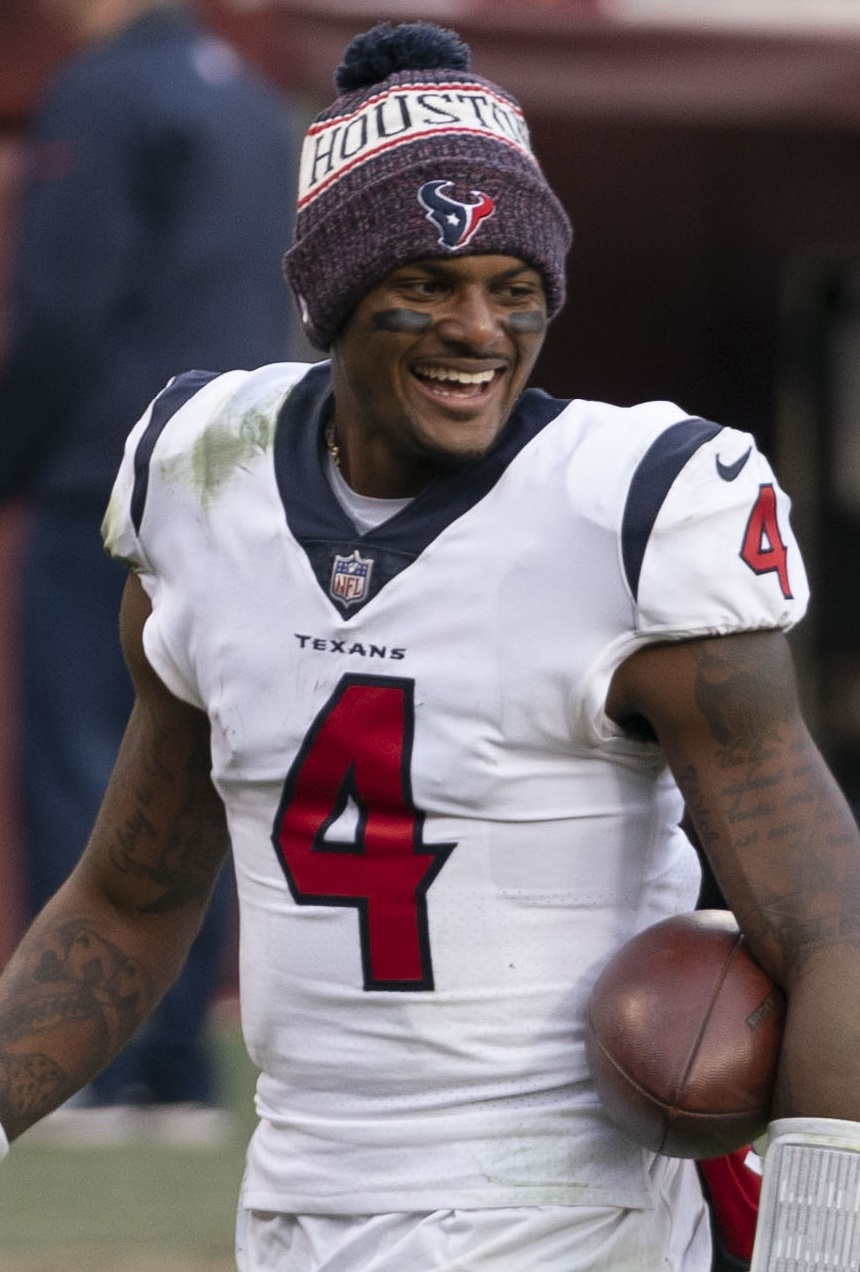
Quarterback Deshaun Watson, taken 12th overall by Houston, is a three-time Pro-Bowler and led the Texans to two division titles before he was traded to Cleveland.

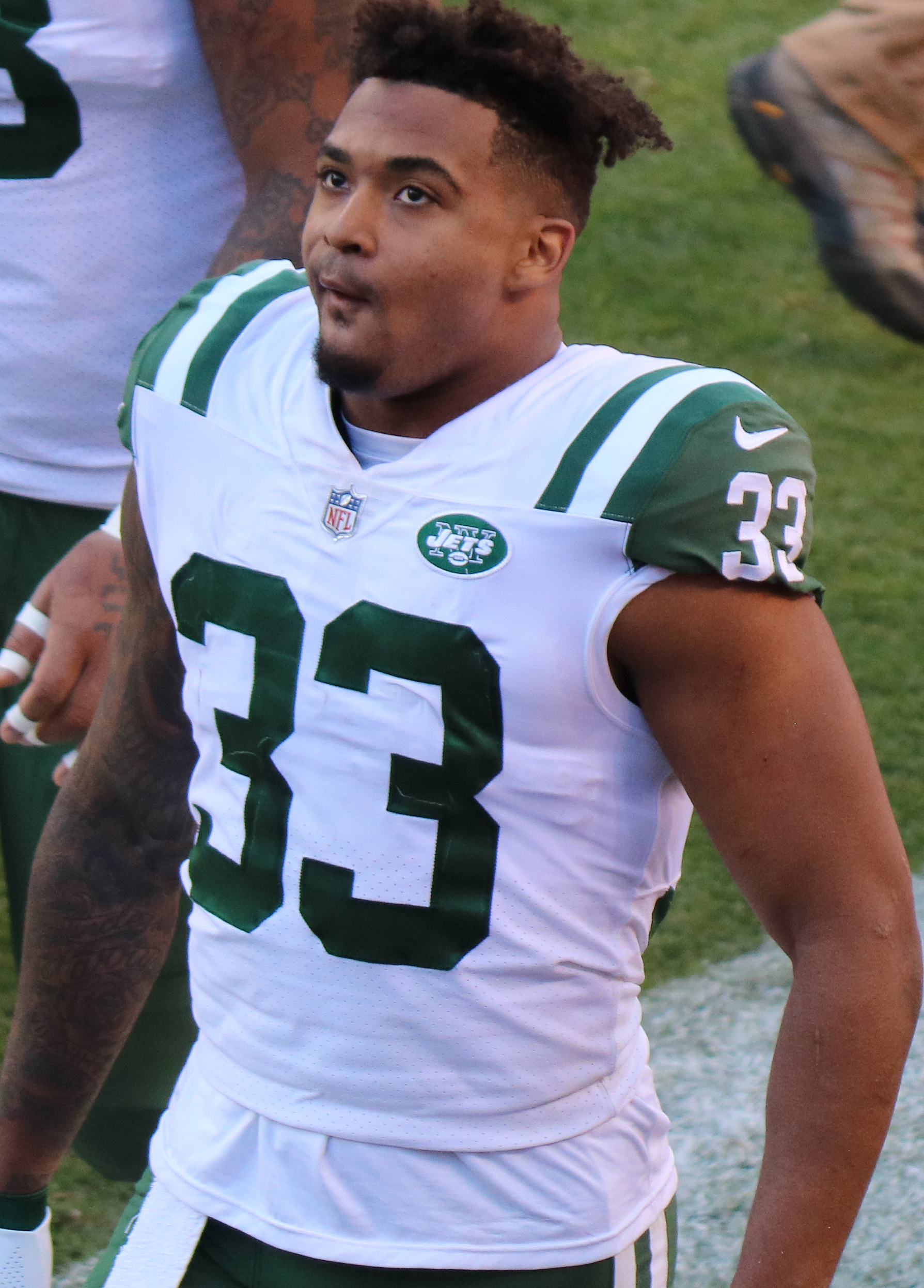
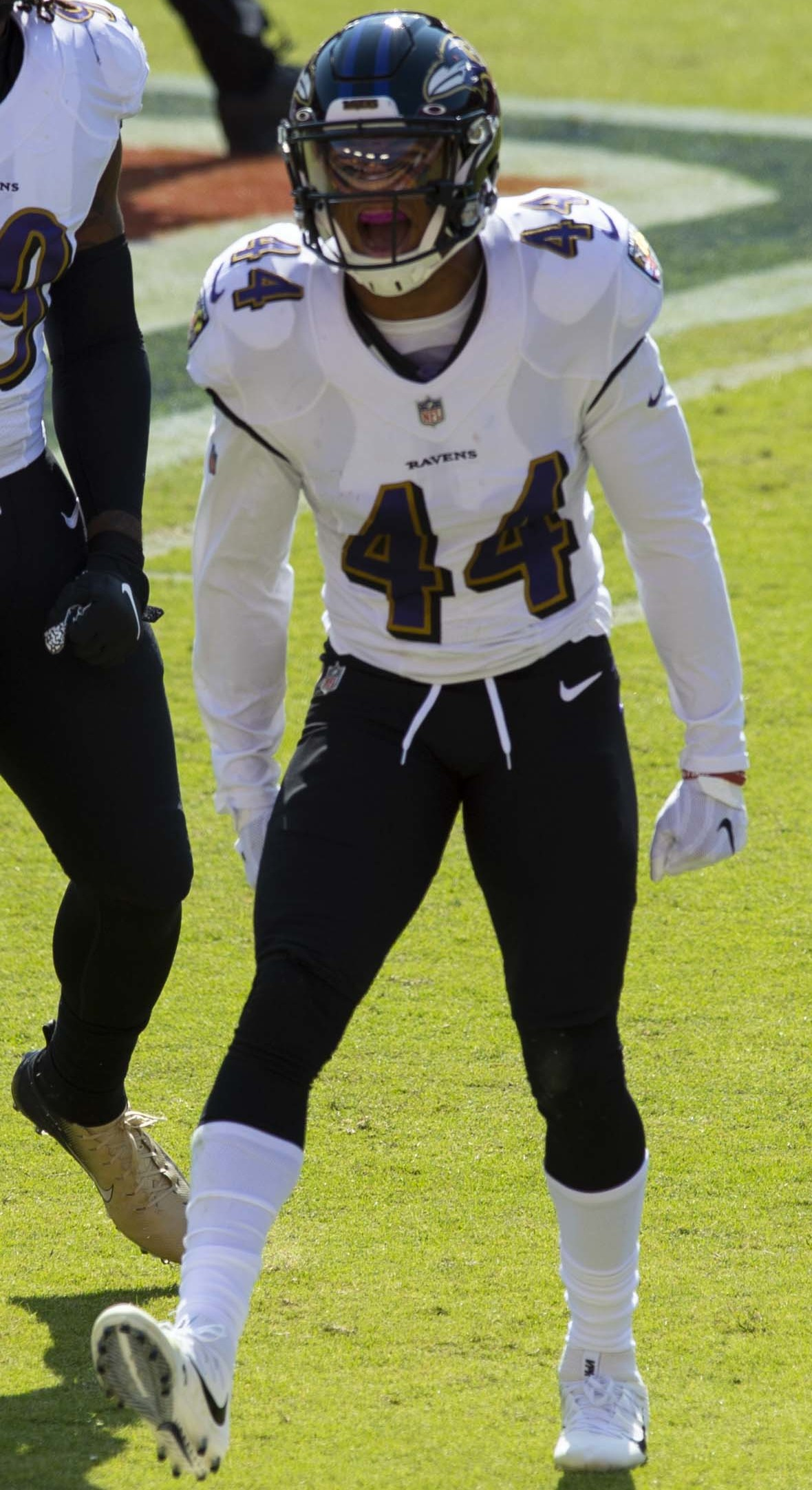
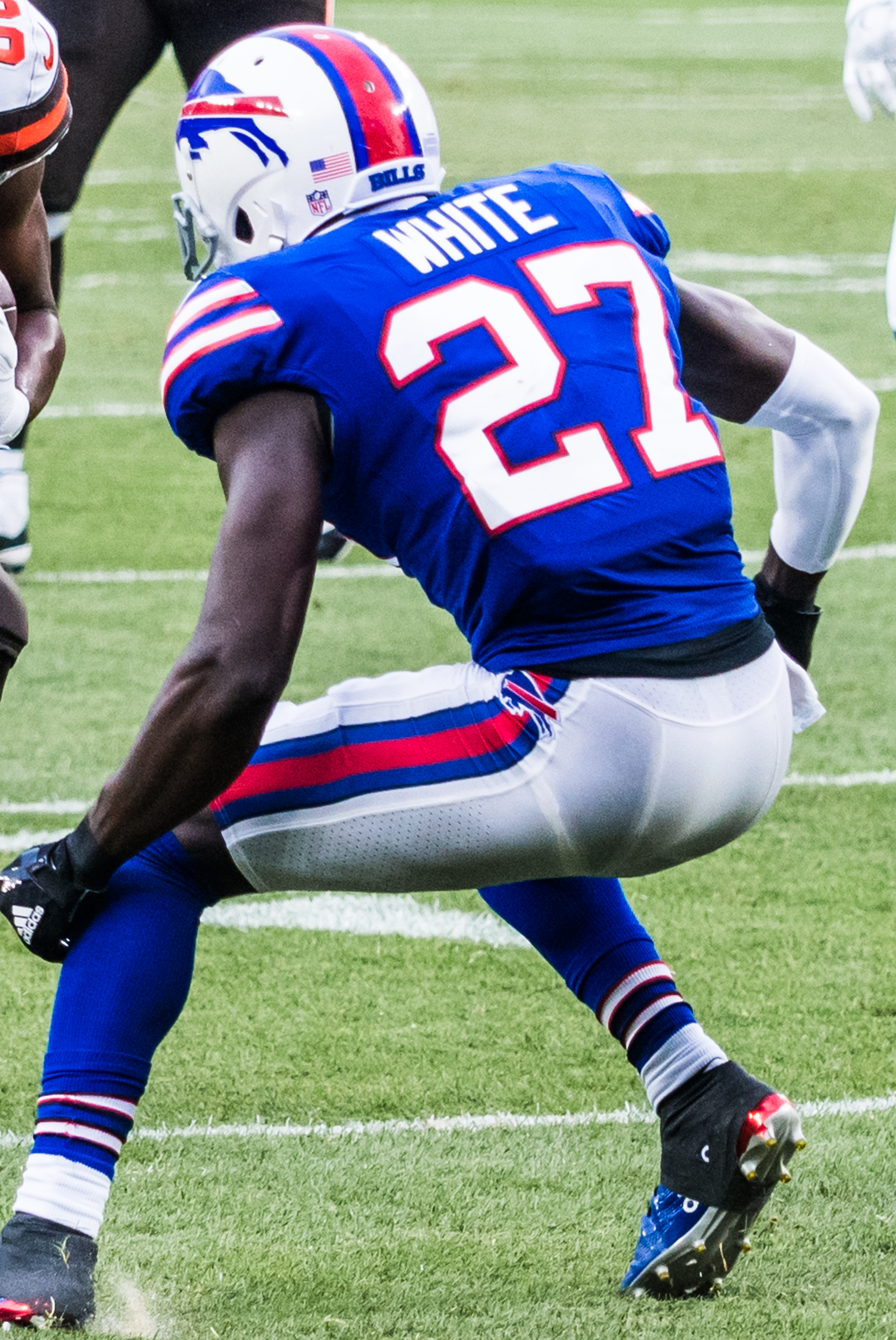
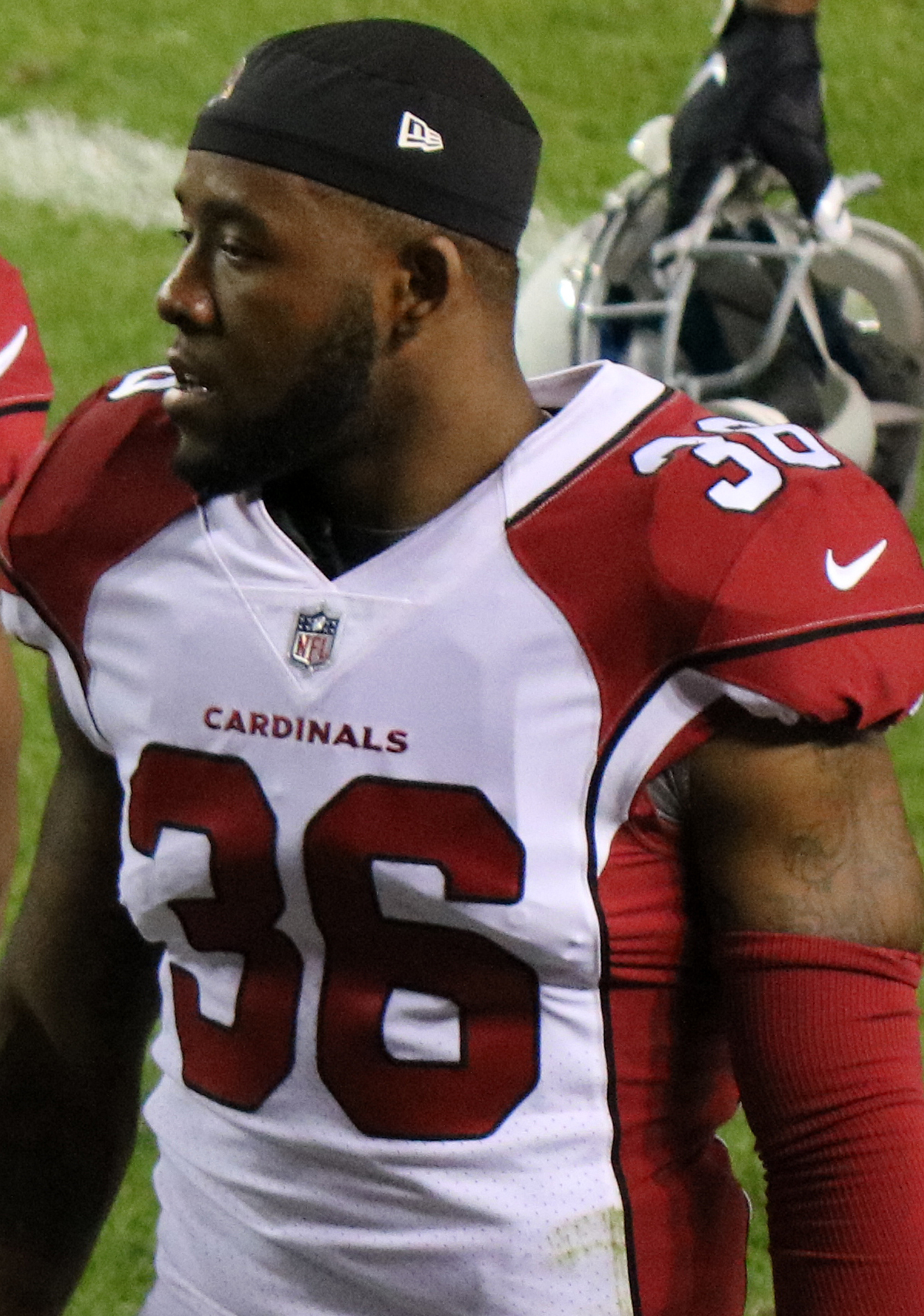
Notable defensive backs selected in the 2017 NFL draft include (from top to bottom): Jamal Adams, Marlon Humphrey, Tre'Davious White and Budda Baker.
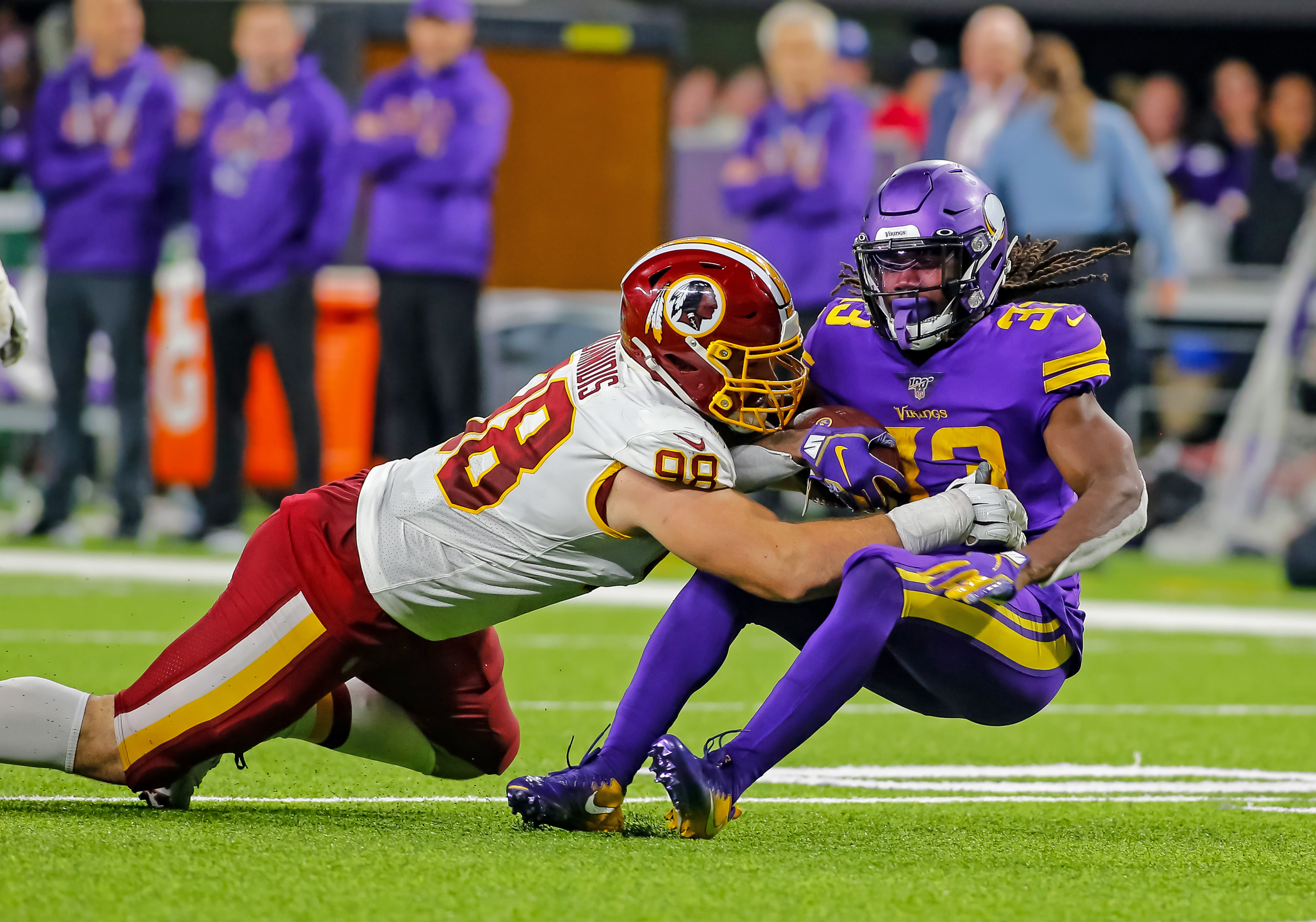
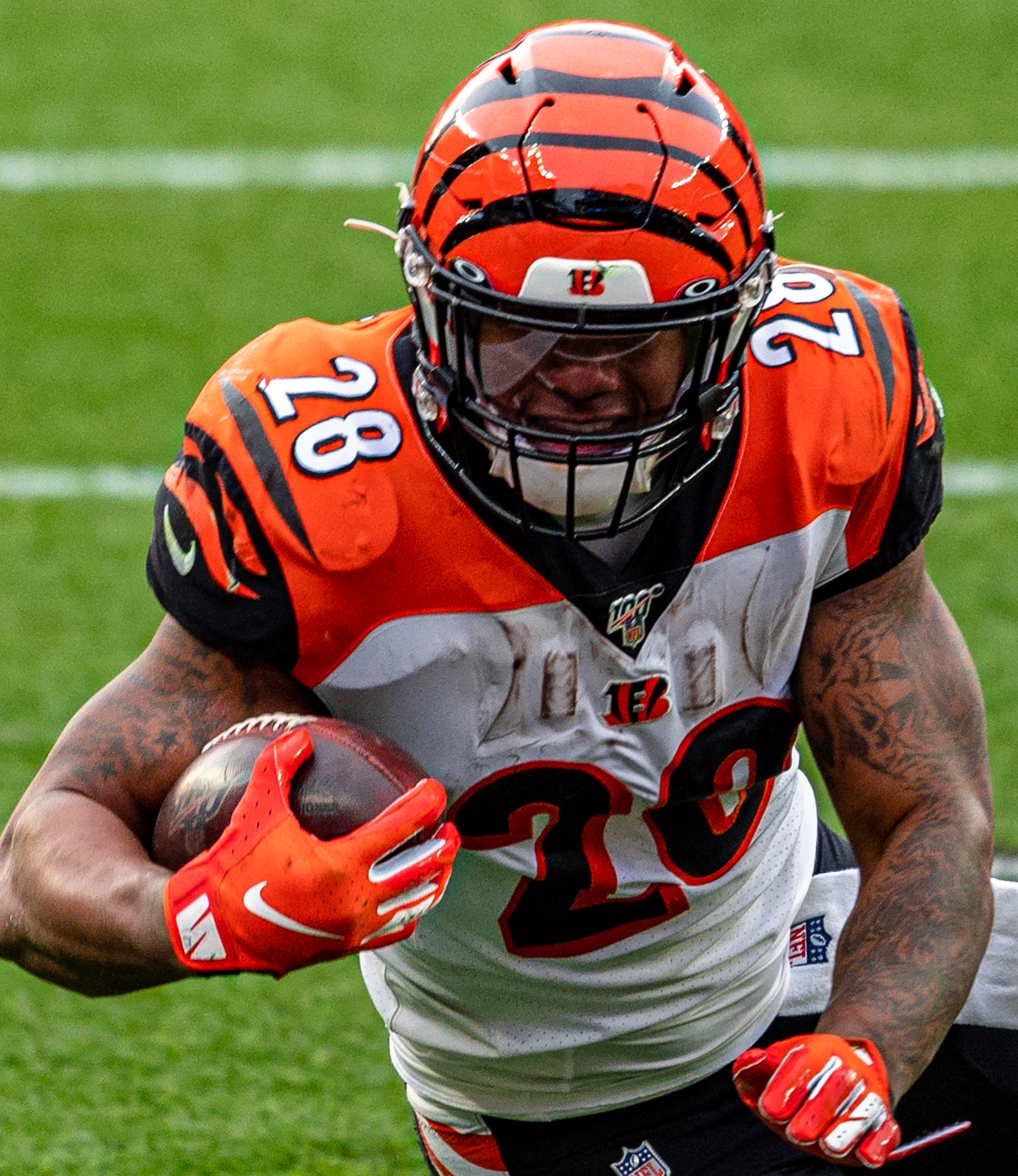
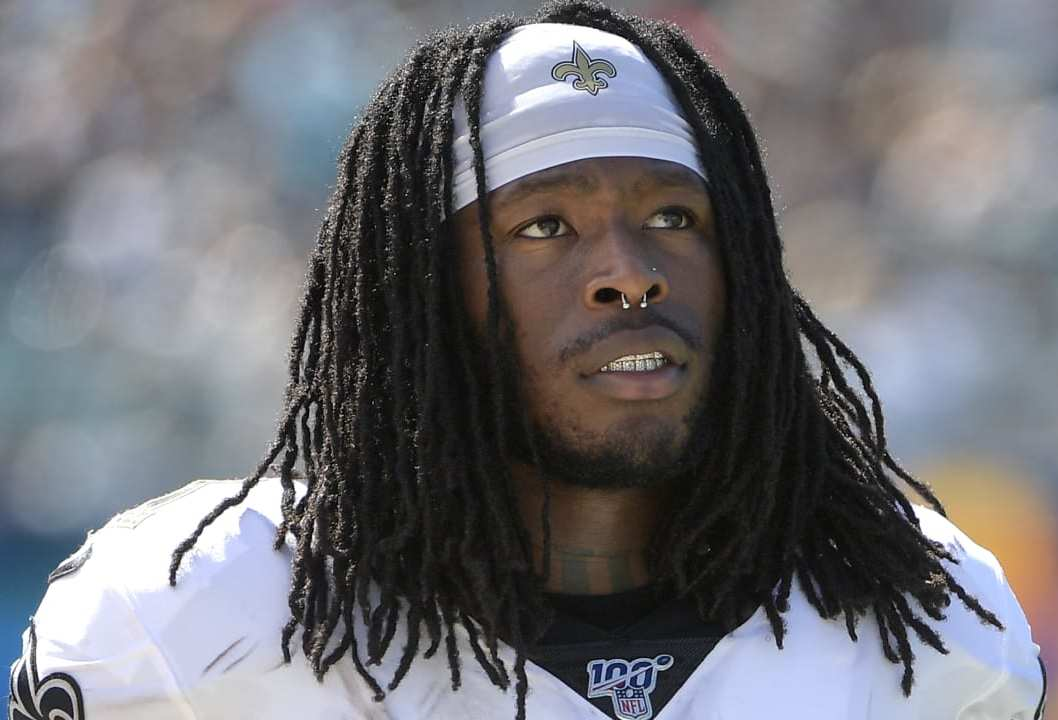
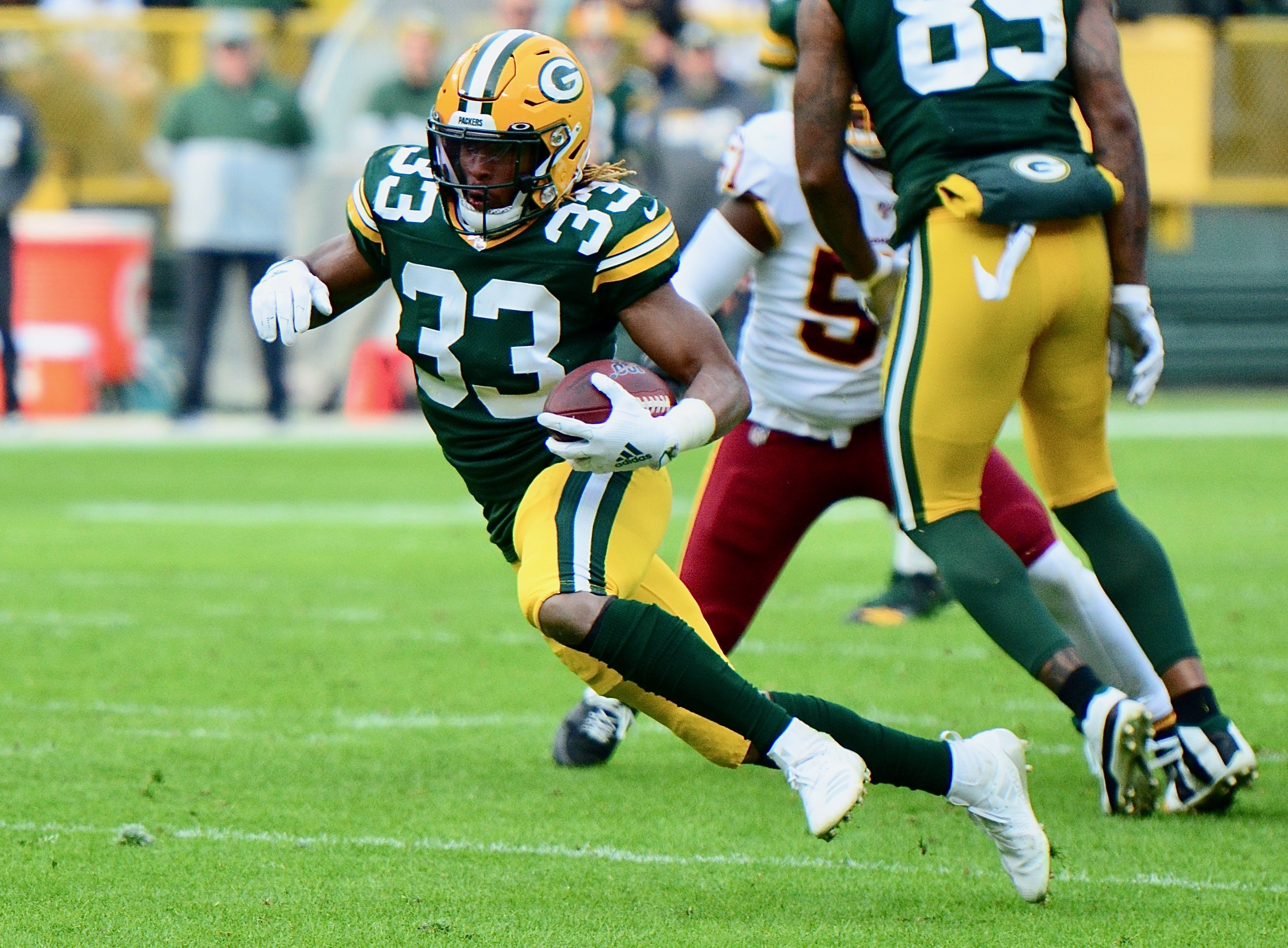
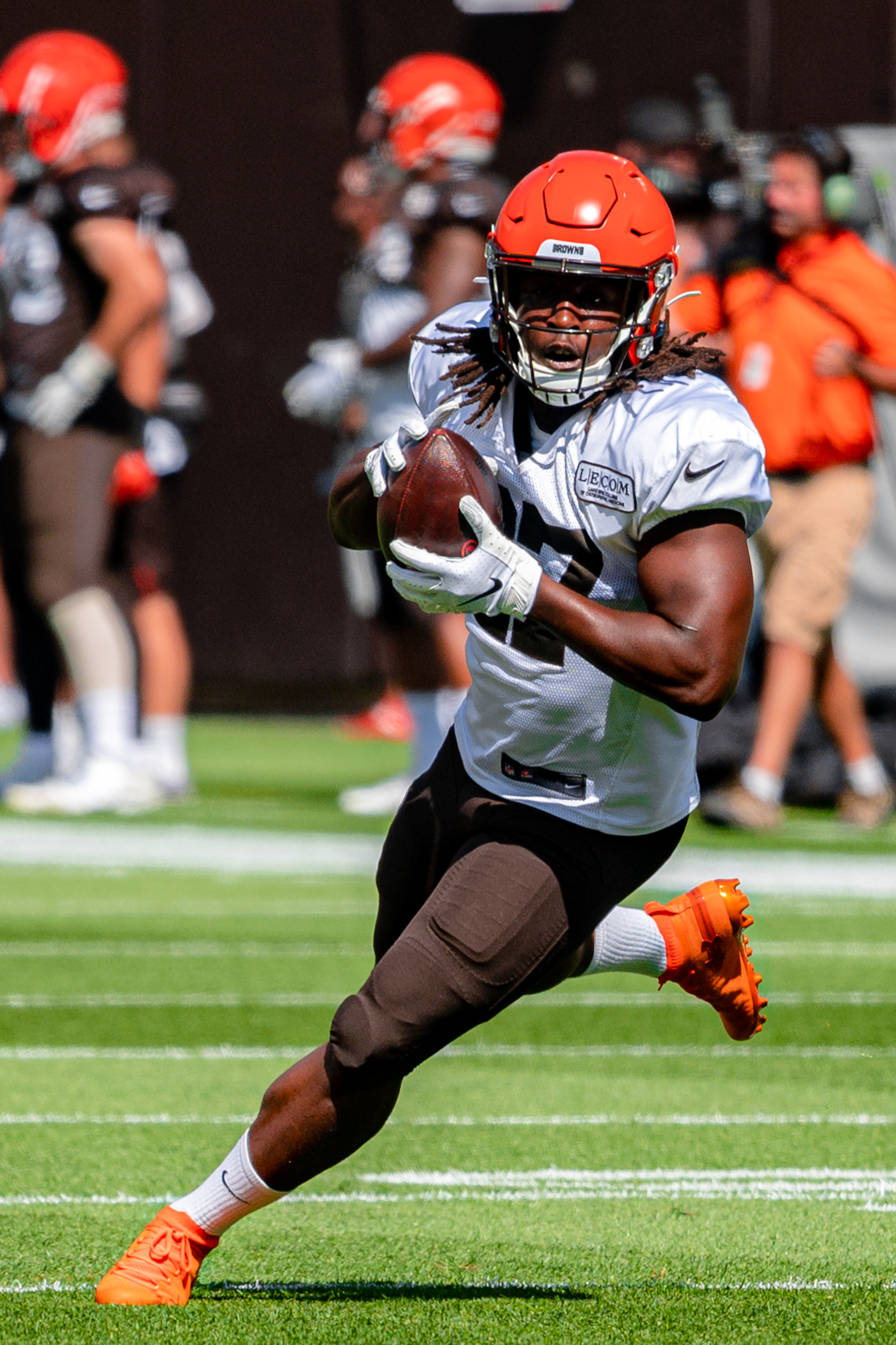
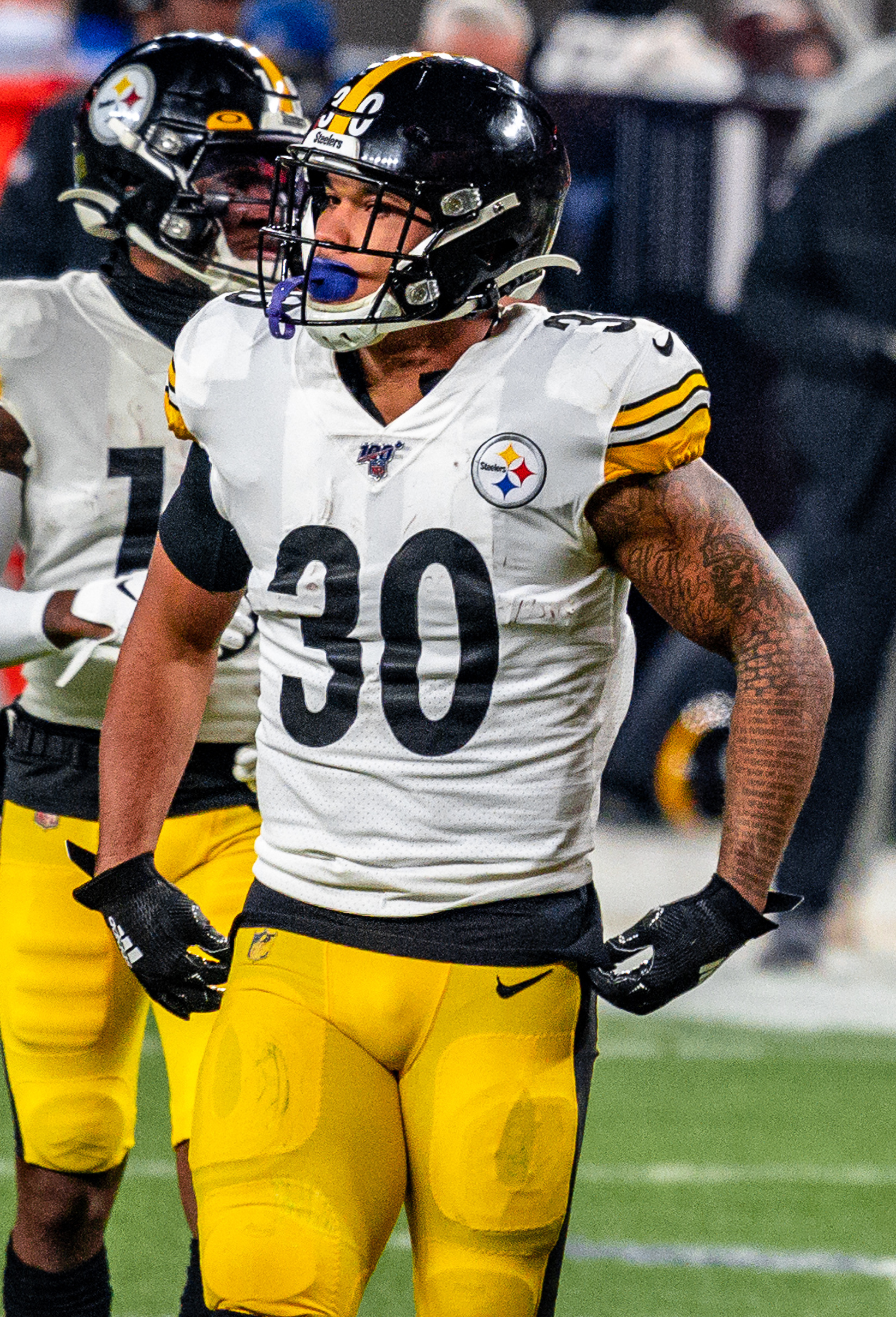
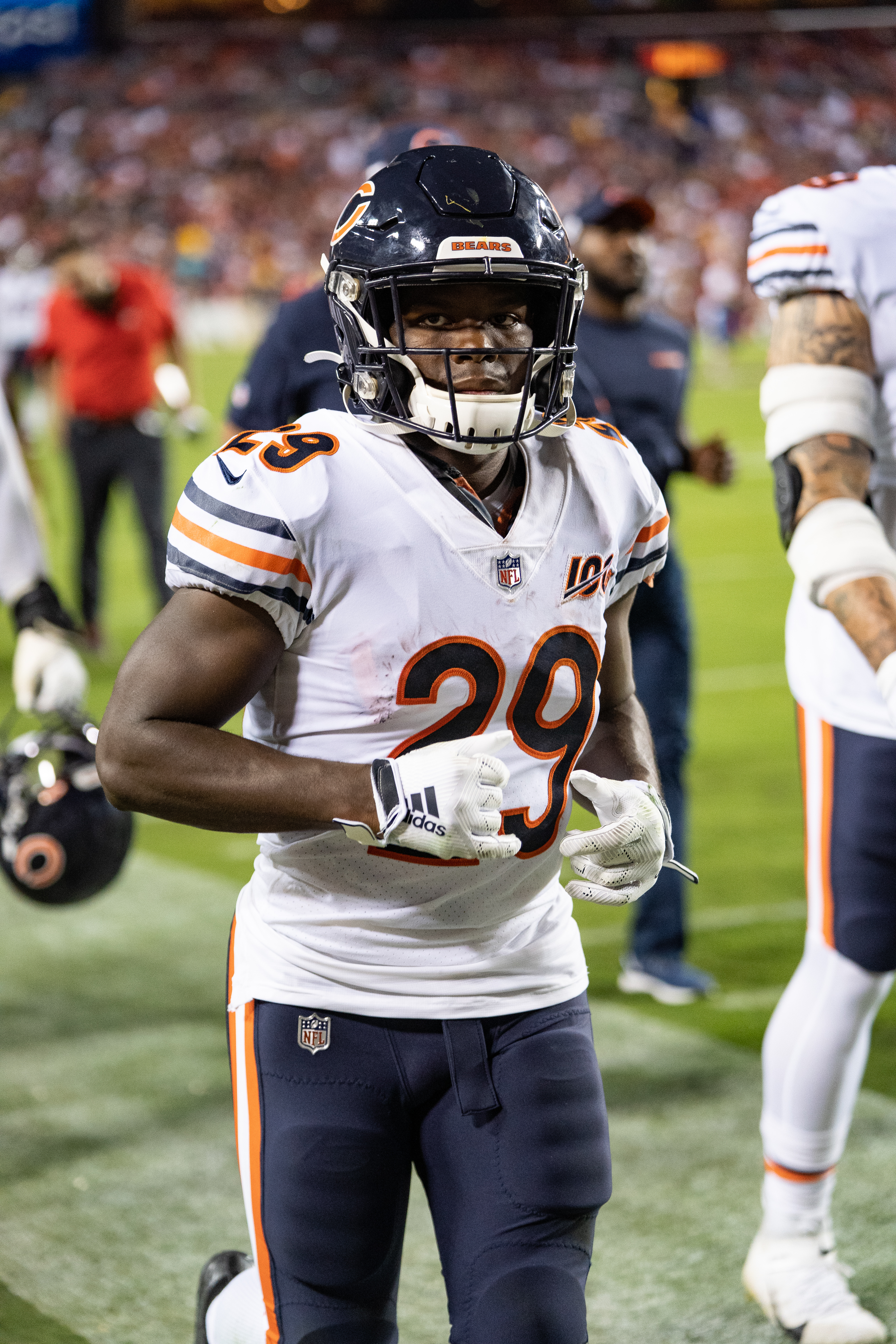
Other notable running backs from the 2017 draft include Dalvin Cook, Joe Mixon, Alvin Kamara, Aaron Jones, Kareem Hunt, James Conner and Tarik Cohen.

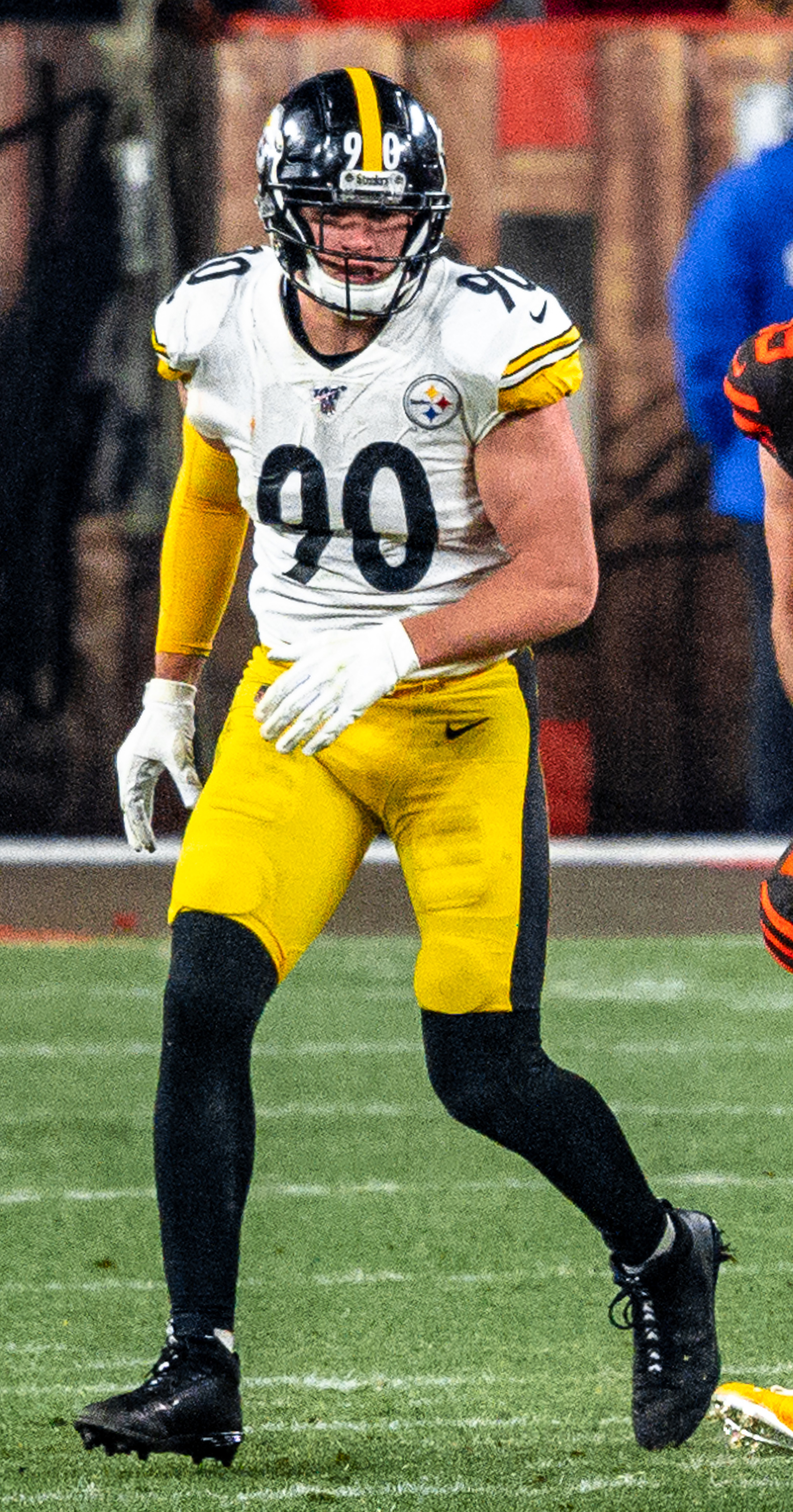
Linebacker T. J. Watt, taken 30th overall, won the 2021 Defensive Player of the Year award and has earned four first-team All-Pro and eight Pro Bowl selections. He tied Michael Strahan's record for the most sacks (22.5) in a single NFL season in 2021, which he held until it was broken by Garrett in 2025.

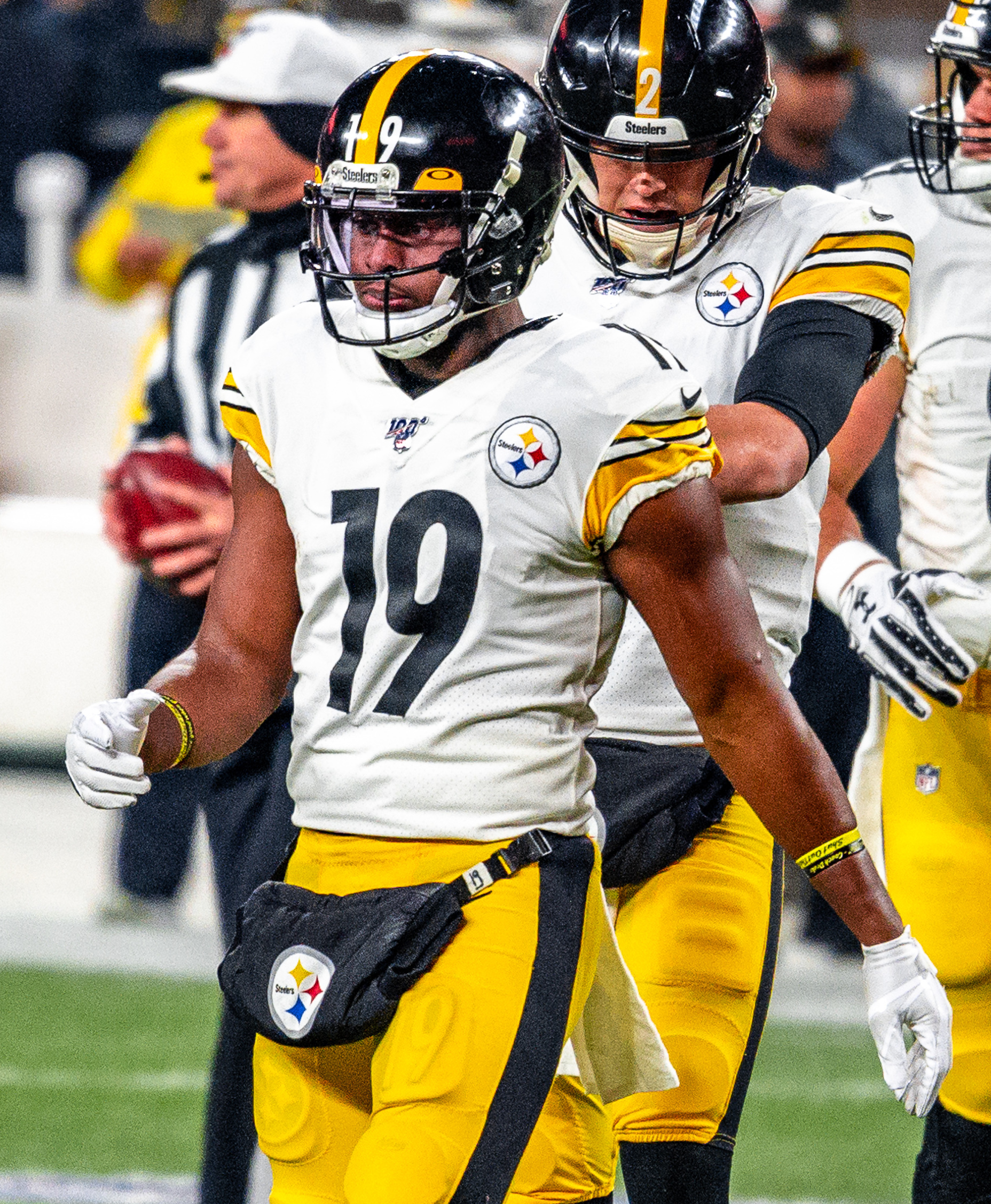
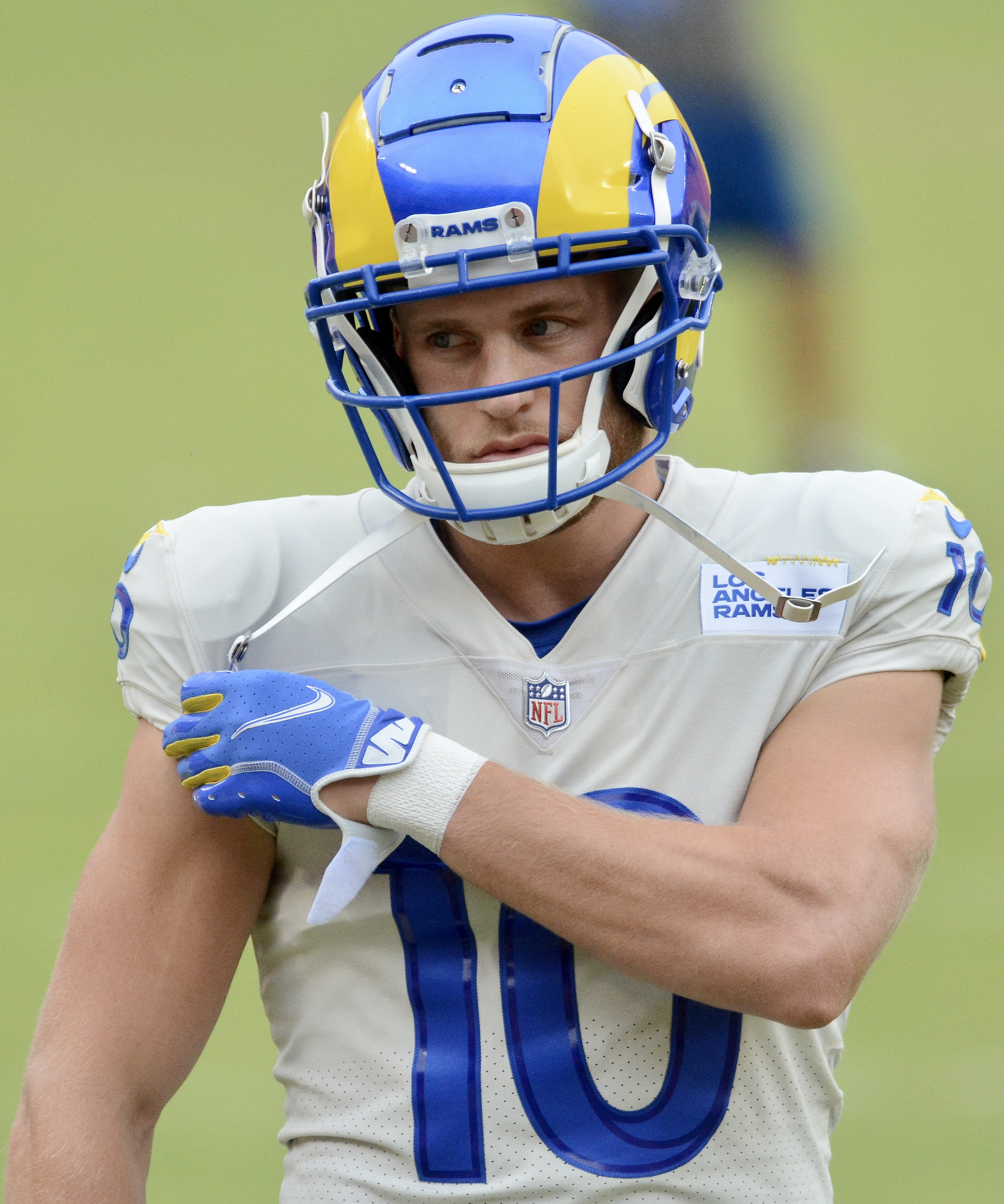
JuJu Smith-Schuster (top), was selected in the second round and is the youngest player to reach 2,500 career receiving yards, while Cooper Kupp (bottom), a third-round pick by the LA Rams, won the triple crown of receiving in 2021 and was the third wide receiver to win the Offensive Player of the Year award in route to playing in a Super Bowl. Kupp was the MVP of Super Bowl LVI.

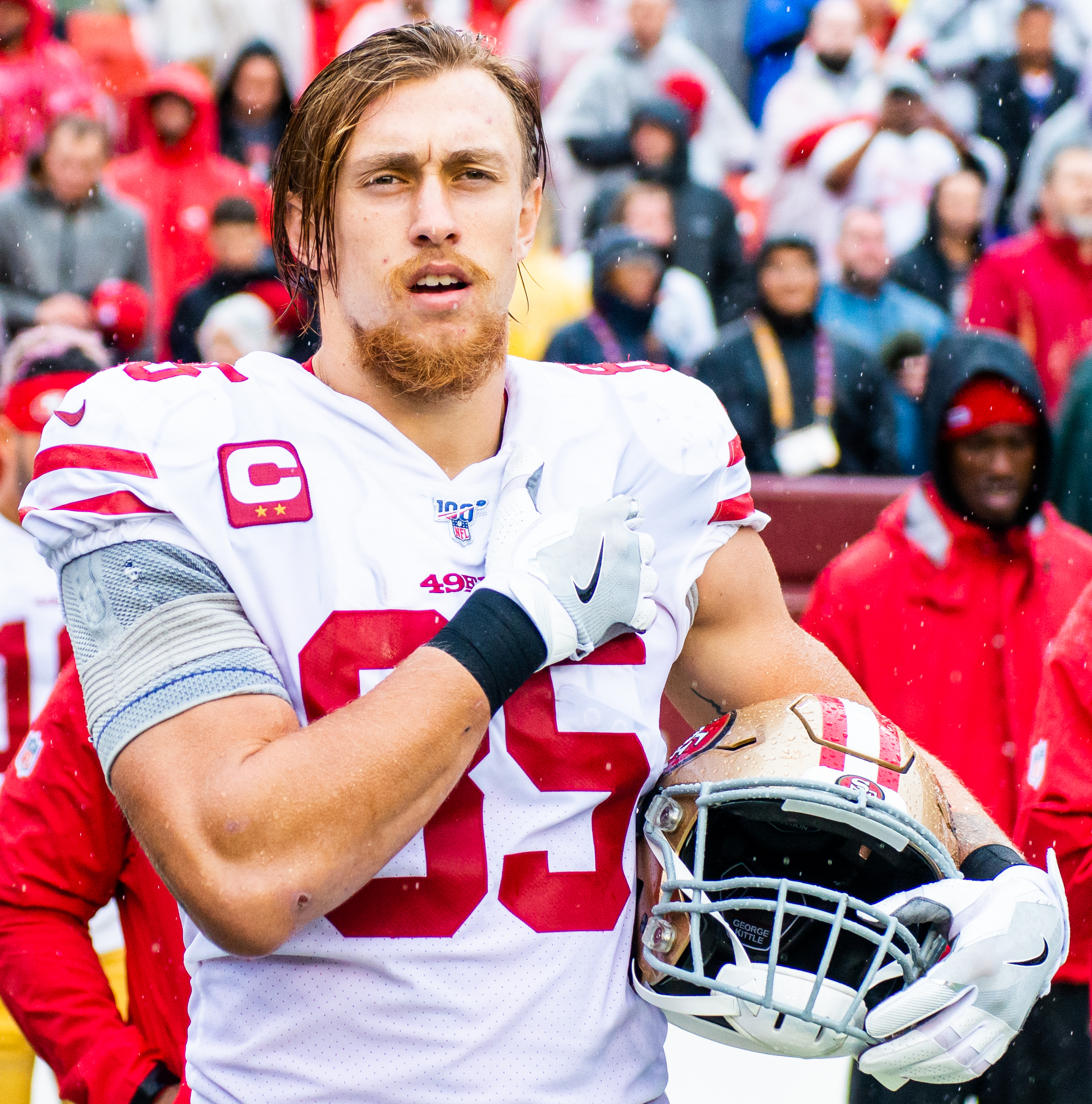
San Francisco tight end George Kittle, taken in the fifth round, is a seven-time Pro Bowler and held the record for the most receiving yards by a player in a season at the position until Travis Kelce broke his record in 2020.

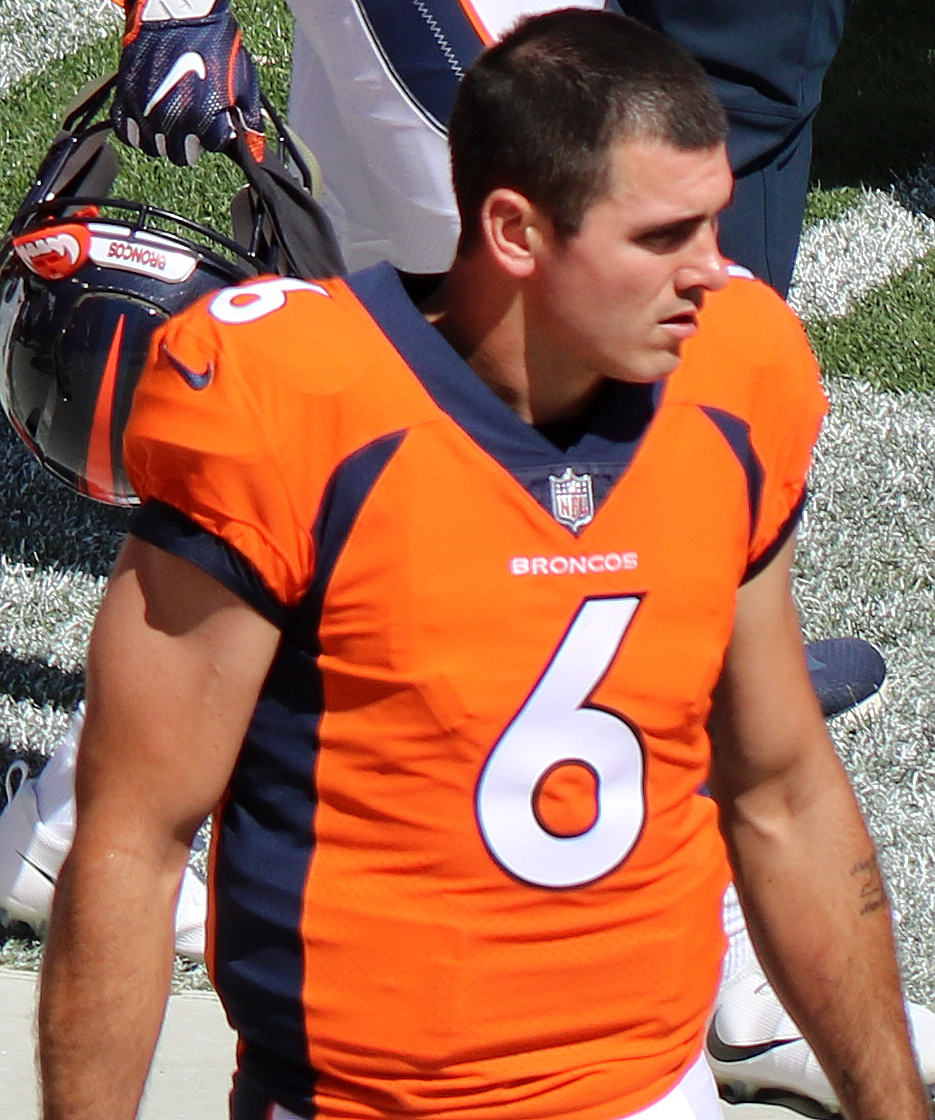
Chad Kelly was taken with the final pick of the draft by the Denver Broncos.

Rnd.	Pick	Team	Player	Pos.	College	Notes
1	1	Cleveland Browns	Myles Garrett ^{†}	DE	Texas A&M	
1	2	Chicago Bears	Mitchell Trubisky ^{†}	QB	North Carolina	from San Francisco (Note: No. 2: San Francisco → Chicago (D). San Francisco traded a first-round selection (2nd overall) to Chicago in exchange for first-, third- and fourth-round selections (3rd, 67th and 111th overall), and a 2018 third-round selection.)
1	3	San Francisco 49ers	Solomon Thomas	DE	Stanford	from Chicago (Note: No. 3: Chicago → San Francisco (D). See Round 1: San Francisco → Chicago.)
1	4	Jacksonville Jaguars	Leonard Fournette	RB	LSU	
1	5	Tennessee Titans	Corey Davis	WR	Western Michigan	from LA Rams (Note: No. 5: LA Rams → Tennessee (PD). The LA Rams traded first- and third-round selections (5th and 100th overall), and a first-, two second- and a third-round selection in 2016 to Tennessee in exchange for a conditional seventh-round selection, and 2016 first-, fourth- and sixth-round selections. Because the Rams received a compensatory selection in the third round of the 2017 draft, that was the pick sent to Tennessee, not the standard third-round pick assigned to the Rams; otherwise, Tennessee would have received the Rams' regular third-round pick, and Tennessee's seventh-round pick would have gone to the Rams.)
1	6	New York Jets	Jamal Adams ^{†}	S	LSU	
1	7	Los Angeles Chargers	Mike Williams	WR	Clemson	
1	8	Carolina Panthers	Christian McCaffrey ^{†}	RB	Stanford	
1	9	Cincinnati Bengals	John Ross	WR	Washington	
1	10	Kansas City Chiefs	Patrick Mahomes ^{†}	QB	Texas Tech	from Buffalo (Note: No. 10: Buffalo → Kansas City (D). Buffalo traded a first-round selection (10th overall) to Kansas City in exchange for first- and third-round selections (27th and 91st overall), and a 2018 first-round selection.)
1	11	New Orleans Saints	Marshon Lattimore ^{†}	CB	Ohio State	
1	12	Houston Texans	Deshaun Watson ^{†}	QB	Clemson	from Philadelphia via Cleveland (Note: No. 12: Philadelphia → Cleveland → Houston. Multiple trades: Philadelphia → Cleveland (PD). Philadelphia traded a first-round selection (12th overall), 2016 first-, third- and fourth-round selections, and a 2018 second-round selection to Cleveland in exchange for a conditional fifth-round selection and a 2016 first-round selection. Since Cleveland received a compensatory fourth-round selection (139th overall), it went to Philadelphia. If it had not, Cleveland would have sent a fifth-round selection to Philadelphia. Cleveland → Houston (D). Cleveland traded a first-round selection (12th overall) to Houston in exchange for a first-round selection (25th overall) and a 2018 first-round selection.)
1	13	Arizona Cardinals	Haason Reddick ^{†}	LB	Temple	
1	14	Philadelphia Eagles	Derek Barnett	DE	Tennessee	from Minnesota (Note: No. 14: Minnesota → Philadelphia (PD). Minnesota traded a first-round selection (14th overall) and a conditional 2018 fourth-round selection to Philadelphia in exchange for QB Sam Bradford.)
1	15	Indianapolis Colts	Malik Hooker	S	Ohio State	
1	16	Baltimore Ravens	Marlon Humphrey ^{†}	CB	Alabama	
1	17	Washington Redskins	Jonathan Allen ^{†}	DE	Alabama	
1	18	Tennessee Titans	Adoree' Jackson	CB	USC	
1	19	Tampa Bay Buccaneers	O. J. Howard	TE	Alabama	
1	20	Denver Broncos	Garett Bolles ^{†}	T	Utah	
1	21	Detroit Lions	Jarrad Davis	LB	Florida	
1	22	Miami Dolphins	Charles Harris	DE	Missouri	
1	23	New York Giants	Evan Engram ^{†}	TE	Ole Miss	
1	24	Oakland Raiders	Gareon Conley	CB	Ohio State	
1	25	Cleveland Browns	Jabrill Peppers	S	Michigan	from Houston (Note: No. 25: Houston → Cleveland (D). See Round 1: Cleveland → Houston.)
1	26	Atlanta Falcons	Takkarist McKinley	DE	UCLA	from Seattle (Note: No. 26: Seattle → Atlanta (D). Seattle traded a first-round selection (26th overall) to Atlanta in exchange for first-, third- and seventh-round selections (31st, 95th and 249th overall).)
1	27	Buffalo Bills	Tre'Davious White ^{†}	CB	LSU	from Kansas City (Note: No. 27: Kansas City → Buffalo (D). See Round 1: Buffalo → Kansas City.)
1	28	Dallas Cowboys	Taco Charlton	DE	Michigan	
1	29	Cleveland Browns	David Njoku ^{†}	TE	Miami (FL)	from Green Bay (Note: No. 29: Green Bay → Cleveland (D). Green Bay traded a first-round selection (29th overall) to Cleveland in exchange for second- and fourth-round selections (33rd and 108th overall).)
1	30	Pittsburgh Steelers	T. J. Watt ^{†}	LB	Wisconsin	
1	31	San Francisco 49ers	Reuben Foster	LB	Alabama	from Atlanta via Seattle (Note: No. 31: Atlanta → Seattle → San Francisco. Multiple trades: Atlanta → Seattle (D). See Round 1: Seattle → Atlanta. Seattle → San Francisco (D). Seattle traded a first-round selection (31st overall) to San Francisco in exchange for second- and fourth-round selections (34th and 111th overall).)
1	32	New Orleans Saints	Ryan Ramczyk	T	Wisconsin	from New England (Note: No. 32: New England → New Orleans (PD). New England traded first- and third-round selections (32nd and 103rd overall) to New Orleans in exchange for a fourth-round selection (118th overall) and WR Brandin Cooks.)
2	33	Green Bay Packers	Kevin King	CB	Washington	from Cleveland (Note: No. 33: Cleveland → Green Bay (D). See Round 1: Green Bay → Cleveland.)
2	34	Jacksonville Jaguars	Cam Robinson	T	Alabama	from San Francisco via Seattle (Note: No. 34: San Francisco → Seattle → Jacksonville. Multiple trades: San Francisco → Seattle (D). See Round 1: Seattle → San Francisco. Seattle → Jacksonville (D). Seattle traded a second-round selection (34th overall) to Jacksonville in exchange for second- and sixth-round selections (35th and 187th overall).)
2	35	Seattle Seahawks	Malik McDowell	DT	Michigan State	from Jacksonville (Note: No. 35: Jacksonville → Seattle (D). See Round 2: Seattle → Jacksonville.)
2	36	Arizona Cardinals	Budda Baker ^{†}	S	Washington	from Chicago (Note: No. 36: Chicago → Arizona (D). Chicago traded second- and seventh-round selections (36th and 221st overall) to Arizona in exchange for second-, fourth- and sixth-round selections (45th, 119th and 197th overall), and a 2018 fourth-round selection.)
2	37	Buffalo Bills	Zay Jones	WR	East Carolina	from LA Rams (Note: No. 37: LA Rams → Buffalo (D). The LA Rams traded second- and fifth-round selections (37th and 149th overall) to Buffalo in exchange for second- and third-round selections (44th and 91st overall).)
2	38	Los Angeles Chargers	Forrest Lamp	G	Western Kentucky	
2	39	New York Jets	Marcus Maye	S	Florida	
2	40	Carolina Panthers	Curtis Samuel	WR	Ohio State	
2	41	Minnesota Vikings	Dalvin Cook ^{†}	RB	Florida State	from Cincinnati (Note: No. 41: Cincinnati → Minnesota (D). Cincinnati traded a second-round selections (41st overall) to Minnesota in exchange for second- and fourth-round selections (48th and 128th overall).)
2	42	New Orleans Saints	Marcus Williams	S	Utah	
2	43	Philadelphia Eagles	Sidney Jones	CB	Washington	
2	44	Los Angeles Rams	Gerald Everett	TE	South Alabama	from Buffalo (Note: No. 44: Buffalo → LA Rams (D). See Round 2: LA Rams → Buffalo.)
2	45	Chicago Bears	Adam Shaheen	TE	Ashland	from Arizona (Note: No. 45: Arizona → Chicago (D). See Round 2: Chicago → Arizona.)
2	46	Indianapolis Colts	Quincy Wilson	CB	Florida	
2	47	Baltimore Ravens	Tyus Bowser	LB	Houston	
2	48	Cincinnati Bengals	Joe Mixon ^{†}	RB	Oklahoma	from Minnesota (Note: No. 48: Minnesota → Cincinnati (D). See Round 2: Cincinnati → Minnesota.)
2	49	Washington Redskins	Ryan Anderson	LB	Alabama	
2	50	Tampa Bay Buccaneers	Justin Evans	S	Texas A&M	
2	51	Denver Broncos	DeMarcus Walker	DE	Florida State	
2	52	Cleveland Browns	DeShone Kizer	QB	Notre Dame	from Tennessee (Note: No. 52: Tennessee → Cleveland (PD). Tennessee traded a second-round selection (52nd overall), and 2016 first- and third-round selections to Cleveland in exchange for 2016 first- and sixth-round selections.)
2	53	Detroit Lions	Teez Tabor	CB	Florida	
2	54	Miami Dolphins	Raekwon McMillan	LB	Ohio State	
2	55	New York Giants	Dalvin Tomlinson	DT	Alabama	
2	56	Oakland Raiders	Obi Melifonwu	S	UConn	
2	57	Houston Texans	Zach Cunningham	LB	Vanderbilt	
2	58	Seattle Seahawks	Ethan Pocic	C	LSU	
2	59	Kansas City Chiefs	Tanoh Kpassagnon	DE	Villanova	
2	60	Dallas Cowboys	Chidobe Awuzie	CB	Colorado	
2	61	Green Bay Packers	Josh Jones	S	NC State	
2	62	Pittsburgh Steelers	JuJu Smith-Schuster ^{†}	WR	USC	
2	63	Buffalo Bills	Dion Dawkins ^{†}	G	Temple	from Atlanta (Note: No. 63: Atlanta → Buffalo (D). Atlanta traded a second-round selection (63rd overall) to Buffalo in exchange for a third- and two fifth-round selections (75th, 149th and 156th overall).)
2	64	Carolina Panthers	Taylor Moton	G	Western Michigan	from New England (Note: No. 64: New England → Carolina (PD). New England traded a second-round selection (64th overall) to Carolina in exchange for a third-round selection (72nd overall) and DE Kony Ealy.)
3	65	Cleveland Browns	Larry Ogunjobi	DT	Charlotte	
3	66	San Francisco 49ers	Ahkello Witherspoon	CB	Colorado	
3	67	New Orleans Saints	Alvin Kamara ^{†}	RB	Tennessee	from Chicago via San Francisco (Note: No. 67: Chicago → San Francisco → New Orleans. Multiple trades: Chicago → San Francisco (D). See Round 1: San Francisco → Chicago. San Francisco → New Orleans (D). San Francisco traded a third-round selection (67th overall) to New Orleans in exchange for a seventh-round selection (229th overall) and a 2018 second-round selection.)
3	68	Jacksonville Jaguars	Dawuane Smoot	DE	Illinois	
3	69	Los Angeles Rams	Cooper Kupp ^{†}	WR	Eastern Washington	
3	70	Minnesota Vikings	Pat Elflein	C	Ohio State	from NY Jets (Note: No. 70: NY Jets → Minnesota (D). The NY Jets traded a third-round selection (70th overall) to Minnesota in exchange for third- and fifth-round selections (79th and 160th overall).)
3	71	Los Angeles Chargers	Dan Feeney	G	Indiana	
3	72	Tennessee Titans	Taywan Taylor	WR	Western Kentucky	from Carolina via New England (Note: No. 72: Carolina → New England → Tennessee. Multiple trades: Carolina → New England (PD). See Round 2: New England → Carolina. New England → Tennessee (D). New England traded third- and sixth-round selections (72nd and 200th overall) to Tennessee in exchange for third- and fourth-round selections (83rd and 124th overall).)
3	73	Cincinnati Bengals	Jordan Willis	DE	Kansas State	
3	74	Baltimore Ravens	Chris Wormley	DE	Michigan	from Philadelphia (Note: No. 74: Philadelphia → Baltimore (PD). Philadelphia traded a third-round selection (74th overall) to Baltimore in exchange for a third-round selection (99th overall) and DT Timmy Jernigan.)
3	75	Atlanta Falcons	Duke Riley	LB	LSU	from Buffalo (Note: No. 75: Buffalo → Atlanta (D). See Round 2: Atlanta → Buffalo.)
3	76	New Orleans Saints	Alex Anzalone	LB	Florida	
3	77	Carolina Panthers	Daeshon Hall	DE	Texas A&M	from Arizona (Note: No. 77: Arizona → Carolina (D). Arizona traded a third-round selection (77th overall) to Carolina in exchange for third- and fourth-round selections (98th and 115th overall).)
3	78	Baltimore Ravens	Tim Williams	LB	Alabama	
3	79	New York Jets	ArDarius Stewart	WR	Alabama	from Minnesota (Note: No. 79: Minnesota → NY Jets (D). See Round 3: NY Jets → Minnesota.)
3	80	Indianapolis Colts	Tarell Basham	DE	Ohio	
3	81	Washington Redskins	Fabian Moreau	CB	UCLA	
3	82	Denver Broncos	Carlos Henderson	WR	Louisiana Tech	
3	83	New England Patriots	Derek Rivers	DE	Youngstown State	from Tennessee (Note: No. 83: Tennessee → New England (D). See Round 3: New England → Tennessee.)
3	84	Tampa Bay Buccaneers	Chris Godwin ^{†}	WR	Penn State	
3	85	New England Patriots	Antonio Garcia	T	Troy	from Detroit (Note: No. 85: Detroit → New England (D). Detroit traded a third-round selection (85th overall) to New England in exchange for third- and fourth-round selections (96th and 124th overall).)
3	86	Kansas City Chiefs	Kareem Hunt ^{†}	RB	Toledo	from Miami via Minnesota (Note: No. 86: Miami → Minnesota → Kansas City. Multiple trades: Miami → Minnesota (PD). Miami traded third- and fourth-round selections (86th and 128th overall), and a 2016 sixth-round selection to Minnesota in exchange for a 2016 third-round selection. If Miami had received a fourth-round compensatory selection, that pick would have gone to Minnesota instead of Miami's original fourth-round selection. Minnesota → Kansas City (D).Minnesota traded a third-round selection (86th overall) to Kansas City in exchange for third-, fourth- and seventh-round selections (104th, 132nd and 245th overall).)
3	87	New York Giants	Davis Webb	QB	California	
3	88	Oakland Raiders	Eddie Vanderdoes	DT	UCLA	
3	89	Houston Texans	D'Onta Foreman	RB	Texas	
3	90	Seattle Seahawks	Shaquill Griffin ^{†}	CB	UCF	
3	91	Los Angeles Rams	John Johnson	S	Boston College	from Kansas City via Buffalo (Note: No. 91: Kansas City → Buffalo → LA Rams. Multiple trades: Kansas City → Buffalo (D). See Round 1: Buffalo → Kansas City. Buffalo → LA Rams (D). See Round 2: LA Rams → Buffalo.)
3	92	Dallas Cowboys	Jourdan Lewis	CB	Michigan	
3	93	Green Bay Packers	Montravius Adams	DT	Auburn	
3	94	Pittsburgh Steelers	Cameron Sutton	CB	Tennessee	
3	95	Seattle Seahawks	Lano Hill	S	Michigan	from Atlanta (Note: No. 95: Atlanta → Seattle (D). See Round 1: Seattle → Atlanta.)
3	96	Detroit Lions	Kenny Golladay ^{†}	WR	Northern Illinois	from New England (Note: No. 96: New England → Detroit (D). See Round 3: Detroit → New England.)
3*	97	Miami Dolphins	Cordrea Tankersley	CB	Clemson	
3*	98	Arizona Cardinals	Chad Williams	WR	Grambling State	from Carolina (Note: No. 98: Carolina → Arizona (D). See Round 3: Arizona → Carolina.)
3*	99	Philadelphia Eagles	Rasul Douglas	CB	West Virginia	from Baltimore (Note: No. 99: Baltimore → Philadelphia (PD). See Round 3: Philadelphia → Baltimore.)
3*	100	Tennessee Titans	Jonnu Smith ^{†}	TE	FIU	from LA Rams (Note: No. 100: LA Rams → Tennessee (PD). See Round 1: LA Rams → Tennessee)
3*	101	Denver Broncos	Brendan Langley	CB	Lamar	
3*	102	Seattle Seahawks	Nazair Jones	DT	North Carolina	
3*	103	New Orleans Saints	Trey Hendrickson ^{†}	LB	Florida Atlantic	from Cleveland via New England (Note: No. 103: Cleveland → New England → New Orleans. Multiple trades: Cleveland → New England (PD). Cleveland traded a third-round selection (103rd overall) to New England in exchange for LB Jamie Collins. New England → New Orleans (PD). See Round 1: New England → New Orleans.)
3*	104	San Francisco 49ers	C. J. Beathard	QB	Iowa	from Kansas City via Minnesota (Note: No. 104: Kansas City → Minnesota → San Francisco. Multiple trades: Kansas City → Minnesota (D). See Round 3: Minnesota → Kansas City. Minnesota → San Francisco (D). Minnesota traded a third-round selection (104th overall) to San Francisco in exchange for fourth- and seventh-round selections (109th and 219th overall).)
3*	105	Pittsburgh Steelers	James Conner ^{†}	RB	Pittsburgh	
3*	106	Seattle Seahawks	Amara Darboh	WR	Michigan	
3*	107	Tampa Bay Buccaneers	Kendell Beckwith	LB	LSU	from NY Jets (Note: No. 107: NY Jets → Tampa Bay (D). The NY Jets traded a third-round selection (107th overall) to Tampa Bay in exchange for fourth- and sixth-round selections (125th and 204th overall).)
4	108	Green Bay Packers	Vince Biegel	LB	Wisconsin	from Cleveland (Note: No. 108: Cleveland → Green Bay (D). See Round 1: Green Bay → Cleveland.)
4	109	Minnesota Vikings	Jaleel Johnson	DT	Iowa	from San Francisco (Note: No. 109: San Francisco → Minnesota (D). See Round 4: Minnesota → San Francisco.)
4	110	Jacksonville Jaguars	Dede Westbrook	WR	Oklahoma	
4	111	Seattle Seahawks	Tedric Thompson	S	Colorado	from Chicago via San Francisco (Note: No. 111: Chicago → San Francisco → Seattle. Multiple trades: Chicago → San Francisco (D). See Round 1: San Francisco → Chicago. San Francisco → Seattle (D). See Round 1: Seattle → San Francisco.)
4	112	Chicago Bears	Eddie Jackson ^{†}	S	Alabama	from LA Rams (Note: No. 112: LA Rams → Chicago (D). The LA Rams traded a fourth-round selection (112th overall) to Chicago in exchange for fourth- and sixth-round selections (117th and 197th overall).)
4	113	Los Angeles Chargers	Rayshawn Jenkins	S	Miami (FL)	
4	114	Washington Redskins	Samaje Perine	RB	Oklahoma	from NY Jets (Note: No. 114: NY Jets → Washington (PD). The NY Jets traded a fourth-round selection (114th overall) to Washington in exchange for a 2016 fifth-round selection.)
4	115	Arizona Cardinals	Dorian Johnson	G	Pittsburgh	from Carolina (Note: No. 115: Carolina → Arizona (D). See Round 3: Arizona → Carolina.)
4	116	Cincinnati Bengals	Carl Lawson	DE	Auburn	
4	117	Los Angeles Rams	Josh Reynolds	WR	Texas A&M	from Buffalo via Chicago (Note: No. 117: Buffalo → Chicago → LA Rams. Multiple trades: Buffalo → Chicago (PD). Buffalo traded a fourth-round selection (117th overall), and 2016 second- and fourth-round selections to Chicago in exchange for a 2016 second-round selection. Chicago → LA Rams (D). See Round 4: LA Rams → Chicago.)
4	–	New England Patriots	from New Orleans; (Note: New Orleans → New England (PD). See Round 1: New England → New Orleans.) Selection forfeited (Note: New England forfeited its highest fourth-round selection due to the Deflategate scandal. The team also forfeited a 2016 first-round selection.)			
4	118	Philadelphia Eagles	Mack Hollins	WR	North Carolina	
4	119	Chicago Bears	Tarik Cohen ^{†}	RB	North Carolina A&T	from Arizona (Note: No. 119: Arizona → Chicago (D). See Round 2: Chicago → Arizona.)
4	120	Minnesota Vikings	Ben Gedeon	LB	Michigan	
4	121	San Francisco 49ers	Joe Williams	RB	Utah	from Indianapolis (Note: No. 121: Indianapolis → San Francisco (D). Indianapolis traded a fourth-round selection (121st overall) to San Francisco in exchange for fourth- and fifth-round selections (143rd and 161st overall).)
4	122	Baltimore Ravens	Nico Siragusa	G	San Diego State	
4	123	Washington Redskins	Montae Nicholson	S	Michigan State	
4	124	Detroit Lions	Jalen Reeves-Maybin ^{†}	LB	Tennessee	from Tennessee via New England (Note: No. 124: Tennessee → New England → Detroit. Multiple trades: Tennessee → New England (D). See Round 3: New England → Tennessee. New England → Detroit (D). See Round 3: Detroit → New England.)
4	125	Los Angeles Rams	Samson Ebukam	LB	Eastern Washington	from Tampa Bay via NY Jets (Note: No. 125: Tampa Bay → NY Jets → LA Rams. Multiple trades: Tampa Bay → NY Jets (D). See Round 4: NY Jets → Tampa Bay. NY Jets → LA Rams (D). The NY Jets traded a fourth-round selection (125th overall) to the LA Rams in exchange for fourth- and sixth-round selections (141st and 197th overall).)
4	126	Cleveland Browns	Howard Wilson	CB	Houston	from Denver (Note: No. 126: Denver → Cleveland (D). Denver traded fourth- and seventh-round selections (126th and 252nd overall) to Cleveland in exchange for two fifth-round selections (145th and 175th overall).)
4	127	Detroit Lions	Michael Roberts	TE	Toledo	
4	128	Cincinnati Bengals	Josh Malone	WR	Tennessee	from Miami via Minnesota (Note: No. 128: Miami → Minnesota → Cincinnati. Multiple trades: Miami → Minnesota (PD). See Round 3: Miami → Minnesota. Minnesota → Cincinnati (D). See Round 2: Cincinnati → Minnesota.)
4	–	New York Giants	Selection moved down 12 spots (Note: The NY Giants' fourth-round selection was moved to the back of the fourth round, after all of the compensatory draft picks (but no more than 12 picks) for illegal use of a walkie-talkie on the sideline during week 14 of the 2016 season. This pick will be no worse than the 35th pick of the fourth round, after the other 30 regular picks and no more than 4 compensatory picks.)			
4	129	Oakland Raiders	David Sharpe	T	Florida	
4	130	Houston Texans	Julién Davenport	T	Bucknell	
4	131	New England Patriots	Deatrich Wise Jr.	DE	Arkansas	from Seattle (Note: No. 131: Seattle → New England (PD). Seattle traded a fourth-round selection (131st overall) and a 2016 seventh-round selection to New England in exchange for 2016 fifth- and seventh-round selections.)
4	132	Philadelphia Eagles	Donnel Pumphrey	RB	San Diego State	from Kansas City via Minnesota (Note: No. 132: Kansas City → Minnesota → Philadelphia. Multiple trades: Kansas City → Minnesota (D). See Round 3: Minnesota → Kansas City. Minnesota → Philadelphia (D). Minnesota traded a fourth-round selection (132nd overall) to Philadelphia in exchange for fourth- and seventh-round selections (139th and 230th overall).)
4	133	Dallas Cowboys	Ryan Switzer	WR	North Carolina	
4	134	Green Bay Packers	Jamaal Williams	RB	BYU	
4	135	Pittsburgh Steelers	Joshua Dobbs	QB	Tennessee	
4	136	Atlanta Falcons	Sean Harlow	C	Oregon State	
4	137	Indianapolis Colts	Zach Banner	G	USC	from New England (Note: No. 137: New England → Indianapolis (PD). New England traded a fourth-round selection (137th overall) to Indianapolis in exchange for a sixth-round selection (200th overall) and TE Dwayne Allen.)
4*	138	Cincinnati Bengals	Ryan Glasgow	DT	Michigan	
4*	139	Kansas City Chiefs	Jehu Chesson	WR	Michigan	from Cleveland via Philadelphia and Minnesota (Note: No. 139: Cleveland → Philadelphia → Minnesota → Kansas City. Multiple trades: Cleveland → Philadelphia (PD). See Round 1: Philadelphia → Cleveland. Philadelphia → Minnesota (D). See Round 4: Minnesota → Philadelphia. Minnesota → Kansas City (D). Minnesota traded a fourth-round selection (139th overall) to Kansas City in exchange for two fifth-round selections (170th and 180th overall).)
4	140	New York Giants	Wayne Gallman	RB	Clemson	Selection dropped 12 spots (see above)
4*	141	New York Jets	Chad Hansen	WR	California	from LA Rams (Note: No. 141: LA Rams → NY Jets (D). See Round 4: NY Jets → LA Rams.)
4*	142	Houston Texans	Carlos Watkins	DT	Clemson	from Cleveland (Note: No. 142: Cleveland → Houston (PD). Cleveland traded a fourth-round selection (142nd overall) to Houston in exchange for a sixth-round selection (188th overall), a 2018 second-round selection and QB Brock Osweiler.)
4*	143	Indianapolis Colts	Marlon Mack	RB	South Florida	from San Francisco (Note: No. 143: San Francisco → Indianapolis (D). See Round 4: Indianapolis → San Francisco.)
4*	144	Indianapolis Colts	Grover Stewart	DT	Albany State	
5	145	Denver Broncos	Jake Butt	TE	Michigan	from Cleveland (Note: No. 145: Cleveland → Denver (D). See Round 4: Denver → Cleveland.)
5	146	San Francisco 49ers	George Kittle ^{†}	TE	Iowa	
5	147	Chicago Bears	Jordan Morgan	G	Kutztown	
5	148	Jacksonville Jaguars	Blair Brown	LB	Ohio	
5	149	Atlanta Falcons	Damontae Kazee	CB	San Diego State	from LA Rams via Buffalo (Note: No. 149: LA Rams → Buffalo → Atlanta. Multiple trades: LA Rams → Buffalo (D). See Round 2: LA Rams → Buffalo. Buffalo → Atlanta (D). See Round 2: Atlanta → Buffalo.)
5	150	New York Jets	Jordan Leggett	TE	Clemson	
5	151	Los Angeles Chargers	Desmond King	CB	Iowa	
5	152	Carolina Panthers	Corn Elder	CB	Miami (FL)	
5	153	Cincinnati Bengals	Jake Elliott ^{†}	K	Memphis	
5	154	Washington Redskins	Jeremy Sprinkle	TE	Arkansas	from New Orleans (Note: No. 154: New Orleans → Washington (PD). New Orleans traded a fifth-round selection (154th overall) and a 2016 fifth-round selection to Washington in exchange for a 2016 fourth-round selection.)
5	155	Tennessee Titans	Jayon Brown	LB	UCLA	from Philadelphia (Note: No. 155: Philadelphia → Tennessee (D). Philadelphia traded a fifth-round selection (155th overall) to Tennessee in exchange for fifth- and sixth-round selections (164th and 214th overall).)
5	156	Atlanta Falcons	Brian Hill	RB	Wyoming	from Buffalo (Note: No. 156: Buffalo → Atlanta (D). See Round 2: Atlanta → Buffalo.)
5	157	Arizona Cardinals	Will Holden	T	Vanderbilt	
5	158	Indianapolis Colts	Nate Hairston	CB	Temple	
5	159	Baltimore Ravens	Jermaine Eluemunor	T	Texas A&M	
5	160	Cleveland Browns	Roderick Johnson	T	Florida State	from Minnesota via NY Jets (Note: No. 160: Minnesota → NY Jets → Cleveland. Multiple trades: Minnesota → NY Jets (D). See Round 3: NY Jets → Minnesota. NY Jets → Cleveland (D). The NY Jets traded fifth- and seventh-round selections (160th and 224th overall)) to Cleveland in exchange for fifth- and sixth-round selections (181st and 188th overall).)
5	161	Indianapolis Colts	Anthony Walker Jr.	LB	Northwestern	from Washington via San Francisco (Note: No. 161: Washington → San Francisco → Indianapolis. Multiple trades: Washington → San Francisco (PD). Washington traded a fifth-round selection (161st overall) to San Francisco in exchange for a seventh-round selection (220th overall) and TE Derek Carrier. San Francisco → Indianapolis (D). See Round 4: Indianapolis → San Francisco.)
5	162	Tampa Bay Buccaneers	Jeremy McNichols	RB	Boise State	
5	163	Buffalo Bills	Matt Milano ^{†}	LB	Boston College	from Denver via New England (Note: No. 163: Denver → New England → Buffalo. Multiple trades: Denver → New England (PD). Denver traded a fifth-round selection (163rd overall) to New England in exchange for TE A. J. Derby. New England → Buffalo (PD). New England gave up a fifth-round selection (163rd overall) to Buffalo in exchange for signing RFA RB Mike Gillislee.)
5	164	Miami Dolphins	Isaac Asiata	G	Utah	from Tennessee via Philadelphia (Note: No. 164: Tennessee → Philadelphia → Miami. Multiple trades: Tennessee → Philadelphia (D). See Round 5: Philadelphia → Tennessee. Philadelphia → Miami (D). Philadelphia traded fifth- and sixth-round selections (164th and 194th overall) to Miami in exchange for two fifth-round selections (166th and 184th overall).)
5	165	Detroit Lions	Jamal Agnew ^{†}	CB	San Diego	
5	166	Philadelphia Eagles	Shelton Gibson	WR	West Virginia	from Miami (Note: No. 166: Miami → Philadelphia (D). See Round 5: Philadelphia → Miami.)
5	167	New York Giants	Avery Moss	DE	Youngstown State	
5	168	Oakland Raiders	Marquel Lee	LB	Wake Forest	
5	169	Houston Texans	Treston Decoud	CB	Oregon State	
5	–	Seattle Seahawks	Selection forfeited (Note: Seattle forfeited its fifth-round selection for violating the league's collective bargaining agreement regarding offseason workout policies.)			
5	170	Minnesota Vikings	Rodney Adams	WR	South Florida	from Kansas City (Note: No. 170: Kansas City → Minnesota (D). See Round 4: Minnesota → Kansas City.)
5	171	Buffalo Bills	Nathan Peterman	QB	Pittsburgh	from Dallas (Note: No. 171: Dallas → Buffalo (PD). Dallas traded a fifth-round selection (171st overall) to Buffalo in exchange for a seventh-round selection (228th overall) and QB Matt Cassel.)
5	172	Denver Broncos	Isaiah McKenzie	WR	Georgia	from Green Bay (Note: No. 172: Green Bay → Denver (D). Green Bay traded a fifth-round selection (172nd overall) to Denver in exchange for fifth- and seventh-round selections (175th and 238th overall).)
5	173	Pittsburgh Steelers	Brian Allen	CB	Utah	
5	174	Atlanta Falcons	Eric Saubert	TE	Drake	
5	175	Green Bay Packers	DeAngelo Yancey	WR	Purdue	from New England via Cleveland and Denver (Note: No. 175: New England → Cleveland → Denver → Green Bay. Multiple trades: New England → Cleveland (PD). New England traded a fifth-round selection (175th overall) to Cleveland in exchange for LB Barkevious Mingo. Cleveland → Denver (D). See Round 4: Denver → Cleveland. Denver → Green Bay (D). See Round 5: Green Bay → Denver.)
5*	176	Cincinnati Bengals	J. J. Dielman	C	Utah	
5*	177	San Francisco 49ers	Trent Taylor	WR	Louisiana Tech	from Denver (Note: No. 177: Denver → San Francisco (D). Denver traded a fifth-round selection (177th overall) and RB Kapri Bibbs to San Francisco in exchange for a 2018 fourth-round selection.)
5*	178	Miami Dolphins	Davon Godchaux	DT	LSU	
5*	179	Arizona Cardinals	T. J. Logan	RB	North Carolina	
5*	180	Minnesota Vikings	Danny Isidora	G	Miami (FL)	from Kansas City (Note: No. 180: Kansas City → Minnesota (D). See Round 4: Minnesota → Kansas City.)
5*	181	New York Jets	Dylan Donahue	DE	West Georgia	from Cleveland (Note: No. 181: Cleveland → NY Jets (D). See Round 5: NY Jets → Cleveland.)
5*	182	Green Bay Packers	Aaron Jones ^{†}	RB	UTEP	
5*	183	Kansas City Chiefs	Ukeme Eligwe	LB	Georgia Southern	from New England (Note: No. 183: New England → Kansas City (D). New England traded a fifth-round selection (183rd overall) to Kansas City in exchange for a sixth-round selection (216th overall) and TE James O'Shaughnessy.)
5*	184	Philadelphia Eagles	Nathan Gerry	S	Nebraska	from Miami (Note: No. 184: Miami → Philadelphia (D). See Round 5: Philadelphia → Miami.)
6	185	Cleveland Browns	Caleb Brantley	DT	Florida	
6	186	Baltimore Ravens	Chuck Clark	S	Virginia Tech	from San Francisco (Note: No. 186: San Francisco → Baltimore (PD). San Francisco traded a sixth-round selection (186th overall) to Baltimore Ravens in exchange for a sixth-round selection (198th overall) and C Jeremy Zuttah.)
6	187	Seattle Seahawks	Mike Tyson	S	Cincinnati	from Jacksonville (Note: No. 187: Jacksonville → Seattle (D). See Round 2: Seattle → Jacksonville.)
6	188	New York Jets	Elijah McGuire	RB	Louisiana–Lafayette	from Chicago via Houston and Cleveland (Note: No. 188: Chicago → Houston → Cleveland → NY Jets. Multiple trades: Chicago → Houston (PD). Chicago traded a sixth-round selection (188th overall) to Houston in exchange for TE Khari Lee. Houston → Cleveland (PD). See Round 4: Cleveland → Houston. Cleveland → NY Jets (D). See Round 5: NY Jets → Cleveland.)
6	189	Los Angeles Rams	Tanzel Smart	DT	Tulane	
6	190	Los Angeles Chargers	Sam Tevi	T	Utah	
6	191	Dallas Cowboys	Xavier Woods	S	Louisiana Tech	from NY Jets (Note: No. 191: NY Jets → Dallas (D). The NY Jets traded a sixth-round selection (191st overall) to Dallas in exchange for a 2018 fifth-round selection.)
6	192	Carolina Panthers	Alexander Armah	FB	West Georgia	
6	193	Cincinnati Bengals	Jordan Evans	LB	Oklahoma	
6	194	Miami Dolphins	Vincent Taylor	DT	Oklahoma State	from Philadelphia (Note: No. 194: Philadelphia → Miami (D). See Round 5: Philadelphia → Miami.)
6	195	Buffalo Bills	Tanner Vallejo	LB	Boise State	
6	196	New Orleans Saints	Al-Quadin Muhammad	DE	Miami (FL)	
6	197	New York Jets	Jeremy Clark	CB	Michigan	from Arizona via Chicago and LA Rams (Note: No. 197: Arizona → Chicago → LA Rams → NY Jets. Multiple trades: Arizona → Chicago (D). See Round 2: Chicago → Arizona. Chicago → LA Rams (D). See Round 4: LA Rams → Chicago. LA Rams → NY Jets (D). See Round 4: NY Jets → LA Rams.)
6	198	San Francisco 49ers	D. J. Jones	DT	Ole Miss	from Baltimore (Note: No. 198: Baltimore → San Francisco (PD). See Round 6: San Francisco → Baltimore.)
6	199	Washington Redskins	Chase Roullier	C	Wyoming	from Minnesota (Note: No. 199: Minnesota → Washington (D). Minnesota traded sixth- and seventh-round selections (199th and 230th overall) to Washington in exchange for sixth- and seventh-round selections (201st and 220th overall).)
6	200	New York Giants	Adam Bisnowaty	T	Pittsburgh	from Indianapolis via New England and Tennessee (Note: No. 200: Indianapolis → New England → Tennessee → NY Giants. Multiple trades: Indianapolis → New England (PD). See Round 4: New England→ Indianapolis. New England → Tennessee (D). See Round 3: New England → Tennessee. Tennessee → NY Giants (D). Tennessee traded a sixth-round selection (200th overall) to NY Giants in exchange for sixth- and seventh-round selections (207th and 241st overall).)
6	201	Minnesota Vikings	Bucky Hodges	TE	Virginia Tech	from Washington (Note: No. 201: Washington → Minnesota (D). See Round 6: Minnesota → Washington.)
6	202	San Francisco 49ers	Pita Taumoepenu	DE	Utah	from Denver (Note: No. 202: Denver → San Francisco (PD). Denver traded a sixth-round selection (202nd overall) and a 2016 sixth-round selection to San Francisco in exchange for a 2016 seventh-round selection and TE Vernon Davis.)
6	203	Denver Broncos	De'Angelo Henderson	RB	Coastal Carolina	from Tennessee (Note: No. 203: Tennessee → Denver (PD). Tennessee traded a sixth-round selection (203rd overall) and a 2016 sixth-round selection to Denver in exchange for 2016 fifth- and seventh-round selections.)
6	204	New York Jets	Derrick Jones	CB	Ole Miss	from Tampa Bay (Note: No. 204: Tampa Bay → NY Jets (D). See Round 4: NY Jets → Tampa Bay.)
6	205	Detroit Lions	Jeremiah Ledbetter	DE	Arkansas	
6	206	Los Angeles Rams	Sam Rogers	FB	Virginia Tech	from Miami (Note: No. 206: Miami → LA Rams (PD). Miami traded a sixth-round selection (206th overall) to the LA Rams in exchange for a seventh-round selection (223rd overall) and DE William Hayes.)
6	207	Cincinnati Bengals	Brandon Wilson	CB	Houston	from NY Giants via Tennessee (Note: No. 207: NY Giants → Tennessee → Cincinnati. Multiple trades: NY Giants → Tennessee (D). See Round 6: Tennessee → NY Giants. Tennessee → Cincinnati (D). Tennessee traded a sixth-round selection (207th overall) to Cincinnati in exchange for sixth- and seventh-round selections (217th and 227th overall).)
6	208	Arizona Cardinals	Rudy Ford	S	Auburn	from Oakland (Note: No. 208: Oakland → Arizona (D). Oakland traded a sixth-round selection (208th overall) to Arizona in exchange for sixth- and seventh-round selections (221st and 231st overall).)
6	209	Washington Redskins	Robert Davis	WR	Georgia State	from Houston (Note: No. 209: Houston → Washington (PD). Houston traded a sixth-round selection (209th overall) and a 2016 first-round selection to Washington in exchange for a 2016 first-round selection.)
6	210	Seattle Seahawks	Justin Senior	T	Mississippi State	
6	–	Kansas City Chiefs	Selection forfeited (Note: Kansas City forfeited a sixth-round selection and a 2016 third-round selection for violating the league's anti-tampering policy during the 2015 free agency period.)			
6	211	New England Patriots	Conor McDermott	T	UCLA	from Dallas (Note: No. 211: Dallas → New England (D). Dallas traded a sixth-round selection (211th overall) to New England in exchange for sixth- and seventh-round selections (216th and 239th overall).)
6	212	Green Bay Packers	Kofi Amichia	T	South Florida	
6	213	Pittsburgh Steelers	Colin Holba	LS	Louisville	
6	214	Philadelphia Eagles	Elijah Qualls	DT	Washington	from Atlanta via Tennessee (Note: No. 214: Atlanta → Tennessee → Philadelphia. Multiple trades: Atlanta → Tennessee (PD). Atlanta traded a conditional sixth-round selection (214th overall) and a 2016 sixth-round selection to Tennessee in exchange for G Andy Levitre. Tennessee → Philadelphia (D). See Round 5: Philadelphia → Tennessee.)
6	215	Detroit Lions	Brad Kaaya	QB	Miami (FL)	from New England (Note: No. 215: New England → Detroit (PD). New England traded a sixth-round selection (215th overall) to Detroit in exchange for a seventh-round selection (239th overall) and LB Kyle Van Noy.)
6*	216	Dallas Cowboys	Marquez White	CB	Florida State	from Kansas City via New England (Note: No. 216: Kansas City → New England → Dallas. Multiple trades: Kansas City → New England (D). See Round 5: New England → Kansas City. New England → Dallas (D). See Round 6: Dallas → New England.)
6*	217	Tennessee Titans	Corey Levin	G	Chattanooga	from Cincinnati (Note: No. 217: Cincinnati → Tennessee (D). See Round 6: Tennessee → Cincinnati.)
6*	218	Kansas City Chiefs	Leon McQuay	S	USC	
7	219	Minnesota Vikings	Stacy Coley	WR	Miami (FL)	from Cleveland via San Francisco (Note: No. 219: Cleveland → San Francisco → Minnesota. Multiple trades: Cleveland → San Francisco (PD). Cleveland traded a seventh-round selection (219th overall) to San Francisco in exchange for P Andy Lee. San Francisco → Minnesota (D). See Round 4: Minnesota → San Francisco.)
7	220	Minnesota Vikings	Ifeadi Odenigbo	DE	Northwestern	from San Francisco via Washington (Note: No. 220: San Francisco → Washington → Minnesota. Multiple trades: San Francisco → Washington (PD). See Round 5: Washington → San Francisco. Washington → Minnesota (D). See Round 6: Minnesota → Washington.)
7	221	Oakland Raiders	Shalom Luani	S	Washington State	from Chicago via Arizona (Note: No. 221: Chicago → Arizona → Oakland. Multiple trades: Chicago → Arizona (D). See Round 2: Chicago → Arizona. Arizona → Oakland (D). See Round 6: Oakland → Arizona.)
7	222	Jacksonville Jaguars	Jalen Myrick	CB	Minnesota	
7	223	Tampa Bay Buccaneers	Stevie Tu'ikolovatu	DT	USC	from LA Rams via Miami (Note: No. 223: LA Rams → Miami → Tampa Bay. Multiple trades: LA Rams → Miami (PD). See Round 6: Miami → LA Rams. Miami → Tampa Bay (D). Miami traded a seventh-round selection (223rd overall) to Miami in exchange for a seventh-round selection (237th overall) and a 2018 seventh-round selection.)
7	224	Cleveland Browns	Zane Gonzalez	K	Arizona State	from NY Jets (Note: No. 224: NY Jets → Cleveland (D). See Round 5: NY Jets → Cleveland.)
7	225	Los Angeles Chargers	Isaac Rochell	DE	Notre Dame	
7	226	Seattle Seahawks	David Moore	WR	East Central	from Carolina (Note: No. 226: Carolina → Seattle (PD). Carolina traded a conditional seventh-round selection (226th overall) to Seattle in exchange for WR Kevin Norwood; if Norwood had not made Carolina's roster, the pick would have reverted to them.)
7	227	Tennessee Titans	Josh Carraway	LB	TCU	from Cincinnati (Note: No. 227: Cincinnati → Tennessee (D). See Round 6: Tennessee → Cincinnati.)
7	228	Dallas Cowboys	Joey Ivie	DT	Florida	from Buffalo (Note: No. 228: Buffalo → Dallas (PD). See Round 5: Dallas → Buffalo.)
7	229	San Francisco 49ers	Adrian Colbert	CB	Miami (FL)	from New Orleans (Note: No. 229: New Orleans→ San Francisco (D). See Round 3: San Francisco → New Orleans.)
7	230	Washington Redskins	Josh Harvey-Clemons	S	Louisville	from Philadelphia via Minnesota (Note: No. 230: Philadelphia → Minnesota → Washington. Multiple trades: Philadelphia → Minnesota (D). See Round 4: Minnesota → Philadelphia. Minnesota → Washington (D). See Round 6: Minnesota → Washington.)
7	231	Oakland Raiders	Jylan Ware	T	Alabama State	from Arizona (Note: No. 231: Arizona → Oakland (D). See Round 6: Oakland → Arizona.)
7	232	Minnesota Vikings	Elijah Lee	LB	Kansas State	
7	233	Carolina Panthers	Harrison Butker	K	Georgia Tech	from Indianapolis via Cleveland (Note: No. 233: Indianapolis → Cleveland → Carolina. Multiple trades: Indianapolis → Cleveland (PD). Indianapolis traded a seventh-round selection (233rd overall) to Cleveland in exchange for DE Billy Winn. Cleveland → Carolina (PD). Cleveland traded a seventh-round selection (233rd overall) and P Andy Lee to Carolina in exchange for a 2018 fourth-round selection and P Kasey Redfern.)
7	234	Los Angeles Rams	Ejuan Price	LB	Pittsburgh	from Baltimore (Note: No. 234: Baltimore → LA Rams (PD). Baltimore traded a seventh-round selection (234th overall) to the LA Rams in exchange for WR Chris Givens.)
7	235	Washington Redskins	Joshua Holsey	CB	Auburn	
7	236	Tennessee Titans	Brad Seaton	T	Villanova	
7	237	Miami Dolphins	Isaiah Ford	WR	Virginia Tech	from Tampa Bay (Note: No. 237: Tampa Bay → Miami (D). See Round 7: Miami → Tampa Bay.)
7	238	Green Bay Packers	Devante Mays	RB	Utah State	from Denver (Note: No. 238: Denver → Green Bay (D). See Round 5: Green Bay → Denver.)
7	239	Dallas Cowboys	Noah Brown	WR	Ohio State	from Detroit and New England (Note: No. 239: Detroit → New England → Dallas. Multiple trades: Detroit → New England (PD). See Round 6: New England → Detroit. New England → Dallas (D). See Round 6: Dallas → New England.)
7	240	Jacksonville Jaguars	Marquez Williams	FB	Miami (FL)	from Miami (Note: No. 240: Miami → Jacksonville (PD). Miami traded a seventh-round selection (240th overall) to Jacksonville in exchange for TE Julius Thomas.)
7	241	Tennessee Titans	Khalfani Muhammad	RB	California	from NY Giants (Note: No. 241: NY Giants → Tennessee (D). See Round 6: Tennessee → NY Giants.)
7	242	Oakland Raiders	Elijah Hood	RB	North Carolina	
7	243	Houston Texans	Kyle Fuller	C	Baylor	
7	244	Oakland Raiders	Treyvon Hester	DT	Toledo	from Seattle (Note: No. 244: Seattle → Oakland (PD). Seattle traded a conditional seventh-round selection (244th overall) to Oakland in exchange for DB Dewey McDonald.)
7	245	Minnesota Vikings	Jack Tocho	CB	NC State	from Kansas City (Note: No. 245: Kansas City → Minnesota (D). See Round 3: Minnesota → Kansas City.)
7	246	Dallas Cowboys	Jordan Carrell	DT	Colorado	
7	247	Green Bay Packers	Malachi Dupre	WR	LSU	
7	248	Pittsburgh Steelers	Keion Adams	DE	Western Michigan	
7	249	Seattle Seahawks	Chris Carson	RB	Oklahoma State	from Atlanta (Note: No. 249: Atlanta → Seattle (D). See Round 1: Seattle → Atlanta.)
7	250	Detroit Lions	Pat O'Connor	DE	Eastern Michigan	from New England (Note: No. 250: New England → Detroit (PD). New England traded a seventh-round selection (250th overall) to Detroit in exchange for TE Michael Williams.)
7*	251	Cincinnati Bengals	Mason Schreck	TE	Buffalo	
7*	252	Cleveland Browns	Matthew Dayes	RB	NC State	from Denver (Note: No. 252: Denver → Cleveland (D). See Round 4: Denver → Cleveland.)
7*	253	Denver Broncos	Chad Kelly	QB	Ole Miss	Mr. Irrelevant

== Notable undrafted players ==
Original NFL team	Player	Pos.	College	Notes
Arizona Cardinals	Ricky Seals-Jones	TE	Texas A&M	
Atlanta Falcons	Daniel Brunskill	G	San Diego State	
Atlanta Falcons	Chris Odom	LB	Arkansas State	
Baltimore Ravens	Jaylen Hill	CB	Jacksonville State	
Baltimore Ravens	Taquan Mizzell	RB	Virginia	
Baltimore Ravens	Ricky Ortiz	FB	Oregon State	
Baltimore Ravens	Tim Patrick	WR	Utah	
Baltimore Ravens	Donald Payne	LB	Stetson	
Baltimore Ravens	Patrick Ricard ^{†}	FB	Maine	
Baltimore Ravens	Tim White	WR	Arizona State	
Chicago Bears	Rashaad Coward	T	Old Dominion	
Chicago Bears	Isaiah Irving	LB	San Jose State	
Cincinnati Bengals	Cethan Carter	TE	Nebraska	
Cleveland Browns	B. J. Bello	LB	Illinois State	
Cleveland Browns	Kai Nacua	FS	BYU	
Dallas Cowboys	Scott Daly	LS	Notre Dame	
Dallas Cowboys	Blake Jarwin	TE	Oklahoma State	
Dallas Cowboys	Joseph Jones	LB	Northwestern	
Dallas Cowboys	Cooper Rush	QB	Central Michigan	
Denver Broncos	Elijah Wilkinson	T	UMass	
Detroit Lions	Storm Norton	T	Toledo	
Detroit Lions	Robert Tonyan	TE	Indiana State	
Green Bay Packers	Taysom Hill	QB	BYU	
Green Bay Packers	Justin Vogel	P	Miami (FL)	
Houston Texans	Dylan Cole	LB	Missouri State	
Houston Texans	Justin Hardee ^{†}	CB	Illinois	
Houston Texans	Dare Ogunbowale	RB	Wisconsin	
Indianapolis Colts	Mo Alie-Cox	TE	VCU	Played college basketball
Indianapolis Colts	Thomas Hennessy	LS	Duke	
Indianapolis Colts	JoJo Natson	WR	Akron	
Indianapolis Colts	Rigoberto Sanchez	P	Hawaii	
Indianapolis Colts	P. J. Walker	QB	Temple	
Indianapolis Colts	Andrew Wylie	T	Eastern Michigan	
Jacksonville Jaguars	Keelan Cole	WR	Kentucky Wesleyan	
Los Angeles Chargers	Michael Davis	CB	BYU	
Los Angeles Chargers	Austin Ekeler	RB	Western State	
Los Angeles Chargers	Younghoe Koo ^{†}	K	Georgia Southern	
Los Angeles Rams	Michael Dunn	G	Maryland	
Los Angeles Rams	Johnny Mundt	TE	Oregon	
Miami Dolphins	Chase Allen	LB	Southern Illinois	
Miami Dolphins	Matt Haack	P	Arizona State	
Miami Dolphins	Torry McTyer	CB	UNLV	
Minnesota Vikings	Tashawn Bower	DE	LSU	
Minnesota Vikings	Eric Wilson	LB	Cincinnati	
New England Patriots	Adam Butler	DT	Vanderbilt	
New England Patriots	Jacob Hollister	TE	Wyoming	
New England Patriots	Christian Kuntz	LS	Duquesne	
New England Patriots	Kenny Moore II ^{†}	CB	Valdosta State	
New Orleans Saints	Dan Arnold	TE	Wisconsin–Platteville	
New Orleans Saints	Arthur Maulet	CB	Memphis	
New York Giants	Calvin Munson	LB	San Diego State	
New York Giants	Chad Wheeler	T	USC	
New York Jets	Ben Braden	G	Michigan	
New York Jets	Austin Calitro	LB	Villanova	
New York Jets	Anthony Firkser	TE	Harvard	
Oakland Raiders	Breon Borders	CB	Duke	
Oakland Raiders	Pharaoh Brown	TE	Oregon	
Oakland Raiders	Nicholas Morrow	LB	Greenville	
Oakland Raiders	Colby Wadman	P	UC Davis	
Philadelphia Eagles	Corey Clement	RB	Wisconsin	
Philadelphia Eagles	Cameron Johnston	P	Ohio State	
Philadelphia Eagles	Jamal Perry	CB	Iowa State	
Philadelphia Eagles	Greg Ward	WR	Houston	
San Francisco 49ers	Kendrick Bourne	WR	Eastern Washington	
San Francisco 49ers	Matt Breida	RB	Georgia Southern	
San Francisco 49ers	Nick Mullens	QB	Southern Miss	
Seattle Seahawks	Cyril Grayson	WR	LSU	
Washington Redskins	Zach Pascal	WR	Old Dominion	

== Summary ==
=== Selections by college athletic conference ===
The SEC led all conferences for the 11th year in a row with 53 selections.

Conference	Round 1	Round 2	Round 3	Round 4	Round 5	Round 6	Round 7	Total
NCAA Division I FBS football conferences
The American	1	4	1	2	3	4	0	15
ACC	4	3	4	6	8	8	10	43
Big 12	1	1	3	2	1	2	4	14
Big Ten	7	3	9	6	6	1	3	35
C-USA	0	1	5	0	2	1	0	9
Ind. (FBS)	0	1	0	1	0	0	1	3
MAC	1	1	3	1	1	0	4	11
MW	0	0	0	2	3	2	1	8
Pac-12	6	6	4	5	5	5	5	36
SEC	12	9	9	8	5	6	4	53
Sun Belt	0	1	1	0	1	2	0	5
NCAA Division I FCS football conferences
Big Sky	0	0	1	1	0	0	0	2
CAA	0	1	0	0	0	0	1	2
Ind. (FCS)	0	0	0	0	0	1	0	1
MEAC	0	0	0	1	0	0	0	1
MVFC	0	0	1	0	1	0	0	2
Patriot	0	0	0	1	0	0	0	1
Pioneer	0	0	0	0	2	0	0	2
SoCon	0	0	0	0	0	1	0	1
Southland	0	0	1	0	0	0	0	1
SWAC	0	0	1	0	0	0	1	2
NCAA Division II football conferences
GAC	0	0	0	0	0	0	1	1
GLIAC	0	1	0	0	0	0	0	1
Gulf South	0	0	0	0	1	1	0	2
PSAC	0	0	0	0	1	0	0	1
SIAC	0	0	0	1	0	0	0	1

=== Schools with multiple draft selections ===
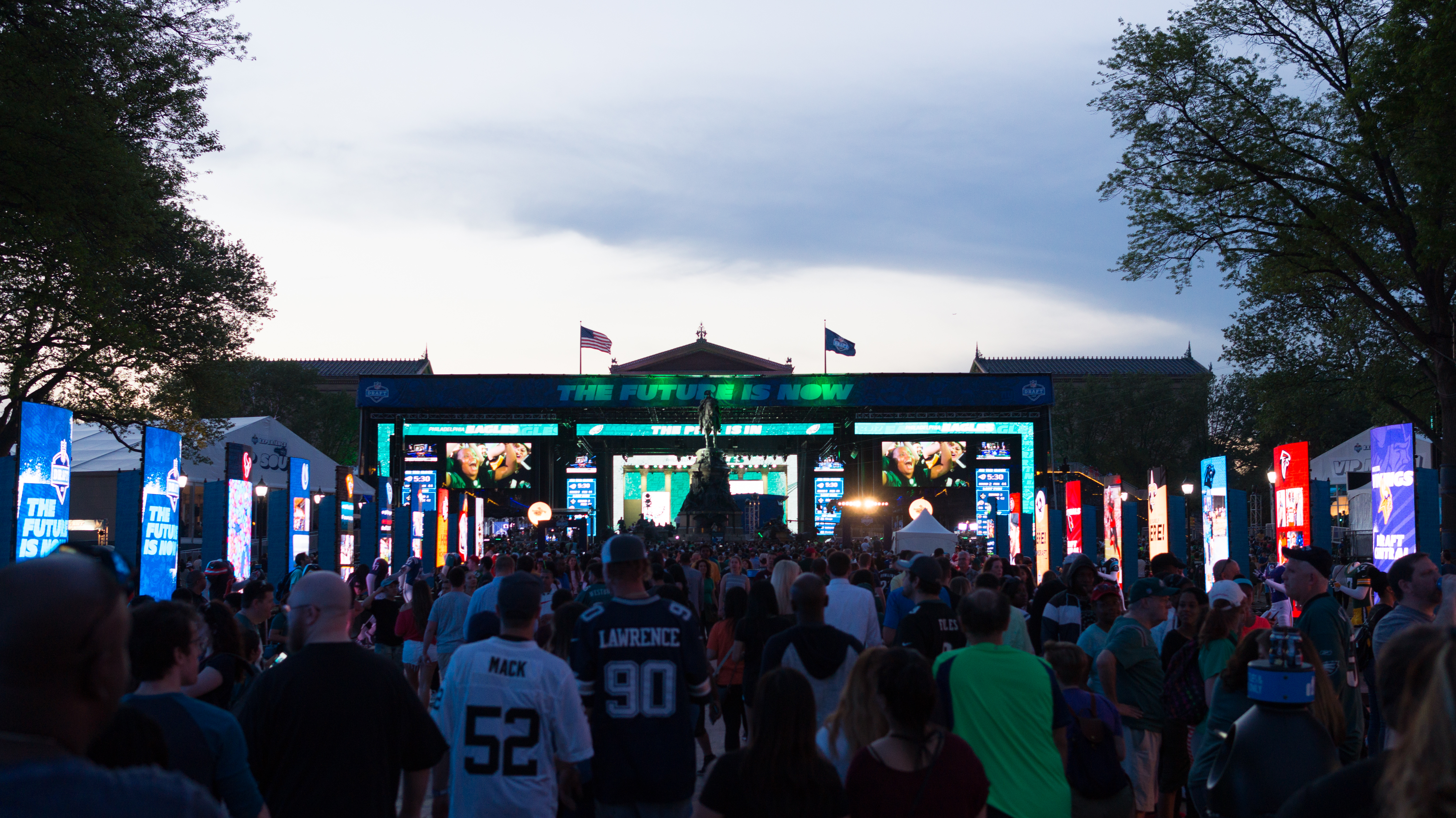
Stage during draft

Michigan and Alabama set school records leading the country with 11 and 10 picks respectively, marking the 2nd consecutive year a Big Ten school had the most players selected.

Selections	Schools
11	Michigan
10	Alabama
9	Miami (FL)
8	Florida, LSU, Utah
7	Ohio State
6	Clemson, North Carolina, Tennessee
5	Pittsburgh, Texas A&M, UCLA, USC, Washington
4	Auburn, Colorado, Florida State, Iowa, Oklahoma, Ole Miss, Virginia Tech
3	Arkansas, California, Houston, Louisiana Tech, NC State, San Diego State, South Florida, Temple, Toledo, Western Michigan, Wisconsin
2	Boise State, Boston College, Eastern Washington, Kansas State, Louisville, Michigan State, Northwestern, Notre Dame, Ohio, Oklahoma State, Oregon State, Stanford, Vanderbilt, Villanova, West Georgia, West Virginia, Western Kentucky, Wyoming, Youngstown State

=== Selections by position ===
Position	Round 1	Round 2	Round 3	Round 4	Round 5	Round 6	Round 7	Total
Center	0	1	1	1	1	1	1	6
Cornerback	5	5	8	1	7	4	4	34
Defensive end	6	2	6	2	2	3	4	25
Defensive tackle	0	2	4	4	1	5	4	20
Fullback	0	0	0	0	0	2	1	3
Guard	0	3	1	3	3	1	0	11
Kicker	0	0	0	0	1	0	2	3
Linebacker	5	4	5	4	6	2	3	29
Long snapper	0	0	0	0	0	1	0	1
Offensive tackle	2	1	1	2	3	5	2	16
Punter	0	0	0	0	0	0	0	0
Quarterback	3	1	2	1	1	1	1	10
Running back	2	2	4	7	4	2	5	26
Safety	3	6	2	4	1	5	2	23
Tight end	3	2	1	1	5	1	1	14
Wide receiver	3	3	8	7	5	1	5	32

Position	Round 1	Round 2	Round 3	Round 4	Round 5	Round 6	Round 7	Total
Offense	13	13	18	22	22	14	16	118
Defense	19	19	25	15	17	19	17	131
Special teams	0	0	0	0	1	1	2	4

== Trades ==
(PD) indicates trades completed prior to the start of the draft (i.e. Pre-Draft), while (D) denotes trades which took place during the 2017 draft. Note that this is the first year where teams were allowed to trade compensatory picks.

Round 1

Round 2

Round 3

Round 4

Round 5

Round 6

Round 7
