= Manel Martínez =

Spanish footballer

Personal information
- Full name: José Manuel Martínez Bel
- Date of birth: 25 March 1992 (age 34)
- Place of birth: Cabrera de Mar, Spain
- Height: 1.85 m (6 ft 1 in)
- Position: Forward

Team information
- Current team: UE Vic
- Number: 19

Youth career
- 2000–2004: La Salle Premià
- 2004–2010: Damm
- 2010–2011: Cornellà

College career
Years	Team	Apps	(Gls)
2012–2014	VCU Rams	58	(8)

Senior career*
Years	Team	Apps	(Gls)
2011	Cornellà	7	(0)
2011–2012	Masnou	27	(4)
2012	Europa	0	(0)
2013	RVA	3	(2)
2015–2016	Sabadell B	31	(17)
2016	Sabadell	18	(4)
2016–2018	Peralada	13	(1)
2016–2017	→ Llagostera (loan)	36	(14)
2017–2018	→ Lorca (loan)	9	(0)
2018–2019	Murcia	34	(6)
2019–2020	Marbella	31	(10)
2020–2022	Atlético Baleares	50	(11)
2022	Surkhon Termez	5	(0)
2023	Racing Ferrol	17	(1)
2023–2024	Sabadell	26	(4)
2024–2025	San Fernando	23	(5)
2025–2026	Ibiza Islas Pitiusas	13	(1)
2026–	UE Vic	22	(9)
- * Club domestic league appearances and goals as of 16 November 2026

José Manuel "Manel" Martínez Bel (born 25 March 1992) is a Spanish footballer who plays as a forward for Lliga Elit club UE Vic.

== Club career ==
Born in Cabrera de Mar, Barcelona, Catalonia, Manel finished his formation with UE Cornellà. He made his senior debut for the club in 2011, and subsequently moved to CD Masnou.

In 2012, after a short period at CE Europa, Manel moved abroad for the first time in his career, joining Virginia Commonwealth University's team VCU Rams while studying. On 17 June 2013, he signed for National Premier Soccer League club RVA FC, being crowned champions with the side.

In January 2015 Manel returned to his homeland, signing for CE Sabadell FC B still in the fourth division. He renewed his contract until 2017 on 16 June, and after scoring 13 goals in only 18 matches, was promoted to the main squad on 31 December; he also extended his contract for a further season.

On 22 July 2016 Manel joined Segunda División side Girona FC, but was loaned to UE Llagostera in the third tier on 18 August, for one year. After scoring 14 goals for the latter he joined Lorca FC on loan the following 15 May, and helped the club in the play-offs as it achieved promotion to the second division for the first time ever.

Manel made his professional debut on 18 August 2017, starting in a 2–0 home win against Cultural y Deportiva Leonesa. The following 11 January he cut ties with the club, returning to Girona and being immediately assigned to the reserves in the third division.

On 17 July 2018, Manel signed for Real Murcia still in the third tier. In the following season, Manel joined Marbella FC.

== Personal life ==
Manel is the son of former FC Barcelona defender Manolo.

== Honours ==
RVA FC

- National Premier Soccer League: 2013
