= VCU Rams football =

- First season: 2011
- Athletic director: Norwood Teague
- Head coach: Alfonso Bell; 1st season, 0–0 (–)
- Location: Richmond, Virginia
- Stadium: TJHS Stadium (capacity: 3,000)
- Colors: Black and gold
- All-time record: 2–5 (.286)
- Bowl record: 0–1 (.000)
- Mascot: Rodney, The Ram

The VCU Rams football team is a club team that represents Virginia Commonwealth University in football. The club team was founded in 2011. There was previously a club football team that operated in the 1970s under business manager Alan Brenner. Home games were at a local high school stadium, but away games were with Duke University and other club teams. Coach was Dave Trinkle, who had been a kicker for the Commanders for a short time.

Prior the arrival of a club football team, there has been increasing interest across the VCU community for the Athletic Department to field a varsity football program. Much of the push for a team has come with the foundation of a varsity football team at Old Dominion University, a major rival of VCU, as well as the recent success of the VCU Rams men's basketball team.

The current club team will be coached by Lamar Bell, and play against nearby Virginia colleges and universities that also do not field varsity level football teams. VCU currently sells a shirt proudly declaring that VCU Football is "Still Undefeated."

== History ==
During former President Eugene P. Trani's administration, he was notable for saying VCU will not have football "on my watch." But now that Trani has stepped down and Michael Rao has filled the vacancy, the debate has sparked once again. The club was founded by President James Tait, Vice President Jules Charles, and Vice President Cole Ransom.

A study was done in 2008 by the VCU Student Government to gauge student interest in football. A total of 8,373 votes were taken and 73% of students agreed that VCU should field a football team. The study also gauged what football could do to VCU's reputation and Alumni participation, finding favorable responses for football in both questions.
