= 2016 American Athletic Conference football season =

- League: NCAA Division I Football Bowl Subdivision)
- Sport: Football
- Duration: September 1, 2016 through January 2017
- Teams: 12
- TV partner(s): ABC, ESPN, ESPN2, ESPNU, and CBS Sports Network

2017 NFL Draft
- Top draft pick: Haason Reddick (Temple)
- Picked by: Arizona Cardinals, 13th overall

Regular season
- Top scorer: Will Worth (150 points)
- East champions: Temple
- East runners-up: South Florida
- West champions: Navy
- West runners-up: Tulsa

The American Championship
- Champions: Temple
- Runners-up: Navy

Football seasons
- 2015 2017

2016 American Athletic Conference football standings
	Conf.			Overall
Team	W		L	W		L
East Division
Temple xy$	7	–	1	10	–	4
No. 19 South Florida x	7	–	1	11	–	2
UCF	4	–	4	6	–	7
Cincinnati	1	–	7	4	–	8
UConn	1	–	7	3	–	9
East Carolina	1	–	7	3	–	9
West Division
Navy xy	7	–	1	9	–	5
Tulsa	6	–	2	10	–	3
Memphis	5	–	3	8	–	5
Houston	5	–	3	9	–	4
SMU	3	–	5	5	–	7
Tulane	1	–	7	4	–	8
Championship: Temple 34, Navy 10
$ – Conference champion; x – Division champion/co-champions; y – Championship game participant; Rankings from AP Poll

The 2016 American Athletic Conference football season was the 26th NCAA Division I FBS football season of the American Athletic Conference (The American). The season was the fourth since the breakup of the former Big East Conference, and the third season with the College Football Playoff in place. The American was considered a member of the "Group of Five" (G5) with Conference USA, the Mid-American Conference, Mountain West Conference, and the Sun Belt Conference. Whereas under the previous system the champion of the conference was guaranteed an automatic berth to a BCS bowl game, the highest-ranked champion member of the G5 received a bid to one of the six major bowls.

The American consisted of 12 members: Cincinnati, East Carolina, Houston, Memphis, SMU, South Florida, Temple, Tulane, Tulsa, UCF, UConn, Navy. In June 2015, the Collegiate Commissioner's Association announced that it would postpone final rankings until after the annual Army–Navy Game if Navy or Army are in contention for a spot in the semifinals or a New Years Six bowl. If Navy was the highest-ranked Group of 5 champion and loses to Army, it would be replaced by next highest-ranked Group of 5 champion in the New Years Six Bowl.

In the 2016 season, the American had four new coaches. Willie Fritz, formerly the head coach at Georgia Southern, was hired by Tulane to replace Curtis Johnson. After beginning the 2013 season, Johnson lost 22 of his final 27 games against FBS opponents. He finished at Tulane with a 15–4 record through four full seasons. He compiled a 7–9 conference record in the C-USA (2012–2013), and a 3–13 conference record in the American Athletic Conference (2014–2015). On December 1, 2015, UCF hired Oregon offensive coordinator Scott Frost. Frost replaced longtime UCF head coach George O'Leary and interim head coach Danny Barrett, who took over the Knights when O'Leary resigned following an 0–8 start. On December 3, 2015, Memphis hired Arizona State offensive coordinator and quarterbacks coach Mike Norvell, replacing Justin Fuente who took the job at Virginia Tech. On December 13, 2015, East Carolina hired Duke (OC/QB) Scottie Montgomery. replacing Ruffin McNeill who was relieved of his duties as ECU head coach after finishing the season with a record of 5–7.

== American Athletic Conference Media Day ==
The American Athletic Conference Media Day took place August 12 in Newport, Rhode Island.

=== Preseason poll ===
East Division

1. USF (15), 164 pts
2. Temple (9), 144 pts
3. Cincinnati (6), 130 pts
4. UConn, 89 pts
5. East Carolina, 55 pts
6. UCF, 48 pts

West Division

1. Houston (30), 180 pts
2. Navy, 128 pts
3. Memphis, 124 pts
4. Tulsa, 92 pts
5. SMU, 65 pts
6. Tulane, 41 pts

- Predicted American Championship Game Winner: Houston (27) was picked to win the American Championship. Others receiving votes were USF (2), Temple (1)

== Head coaches ==
East

- Tommy Tuberville, Cincinnati – 4th year
- Bob Diaco, Connecticut – 3rd year
- Scottie Montgomery, East Carolina – 1st year
- Willie Taggart, South Florida – 4th year
- Matt Rhule, Temple – 4th year
- Scott Frost, UCF – 1st year

West

- Tom Herman, Houston – 2nd year
- Mike Norvell, Memphis – 1st year
- Ken Niumatalolo, Navy – 9th year
- Chad Morris, SMU – 2nd year
- Willie Fritz, Tulane – 1st year
- Philip Montgomery, Tulsa – 2nd year

== Recruiting classes ==
Rankings
Team	ESPN	Rivals	Scout	24/7	Signees
Cincinnati	75	75	73	76	21
Connecticut	–	–	101	98	16
East Carolina	–	81	88	77	22
Houston	30	44	51	40	19
Memphis	72	72	69	63	22
Navy	–	–	98	83	36
SMU	67	74	61	72	22
South Florida	63	70	77	61	16
Temple	59	59	76	57	26
Tulane	–	86	100	89	24
Tulsa	–	87	85	92	20
UCF	66	58	74	66	20

== Rankings ==
Legend
	Improvement in ranking
	Drop in ranking
	Not ranked previous week
	No change in ranking from previous week
RV	Received votes but were not ranked in Top 25 of poll

		Pre	Wk 2	Wk 3	Wk 4	Wk 5	Wk 6	Wk 7	Wk 8	Wk 9	Wk 10	Wk 11	Wk 12	Wk 13	Wk 14	Wk 15	Final
Cincinnati	AP			RV													
Cincinnati	C																
Cincinnati	CFP	Not released															
Connecticut	AP																
Connecticut	C																
Connecticut	CFP	Not released															
East Carolina	AP																
East Carolina	C																
East Carolina	CFP	Not released															
Houston	AP	15	6	6	6	6	6	13	11	RV	RV	RV	RV	18	RV	RV	
Houston	C	13	7	7	7	7	5	12	11	24	RV	RV	RV	21	RV	RV	
Houston	CFP	Not released												20	24		
Memphis	AP					RV											
Memphis	C	RV			RV	RV		RV	RV								
Memphis	CFP	Not released															
Navy	AP	RV	RV					25	24	22		RV	RV	RV	20	RV	
Navy	C	RV	RV	RV	RV	RV		RV	25	22	RV	RV	RV	RV	20	RV	
Navy	CFP	Not released												25	19	25	
SMU	AP									RV							
SMU	C																
SMU	CFP	Not released															
South Florida	AP	RV			RV		RV	RV	RV		RV	RV	RV	RV	24	25	
South Florida	C	RV	RV	RV	RV	RV	RV	RV	RV	RV	RV	RV	RV	RV	23	22	
South Florida	CFP	Not released															
Temple	AP													RV	RV	23	
Temple	C														RV	24	
Temple	CFP	Not released														24	
Tulane	AP																
Tulane	C																
Tulane	CFP	Not released															
Tulsa	AP										RV	RV			RV		
Tulsa	C							RV	RV	RV	RV	RV		RV	RV		
Tulsa	CFP	Not released															
UCF	AP																
UCF	C																
UCF	CFP	Not released															

== Schedule ==
All Times and Dates are Tentative, The 2016 conference football schedule was released February 9

Index to colors and formatting
American member won
American member loss
American teams in **bold**

=== Week 1 ===
Date	Time	Visiting team	Home team	Site	TV	Result	Attendance	Ref.
September 1	7:00 p.m.	UT Martin	**Cincinnati**	Nippert Stadium • Cincinnati, OH	ESPN3	**W** 28–7	28,520	
September 1	7:00 p.m.	Maine	**Connecticut**	Rentschler Field • East Hartford, CT	ASN	**W** 24–21	29,377	
September 1	7:00 p.m.	**Tulane**	Wake Forest	BB&T Field • Winston-Salem, NC	ESPN3	**L** 3–7	24,398	
September 2	7:00 p.m.	Army	**Temple**	Lincoln Financial Field • Philadelphia, PA	CBSSN	**L** 13–28	34,005	
September 3	Noon	No. 3 Oklahoma	No. 15 **Houston**	NRG Stadium • Houston, TX (Texas Kickoff)	ABC	**W** 33–23	71,016	
September 3	Noon	Fordham	**Navy**	Navy–Marine Corps Memorial Stadium • Annapolis, MD	CBSSN	**W** 52–16	28,238	
September 3	6:00 p.m.	Western Carolina	**East Carolina**	Dowdy–Ficklen Stadium • Greenville, NC	ESPN3	**W** 52–7	44,161	
September 3	7:00 p.m.	South Carolina State	**UCF**	Bright House Networks Stadium • Orlando, FL	ESPN3	**W** 38–0	36,260	
September 3	7:00 p.m.	No. 24 (FCS) Towson	**South Florida**	Raymond James Stadium • Tampa, FL	ASN	**W** 56–20	35,976	
September 3	7:00 p.m.	Southeast Missouri State	**Memphis**	Liberty Bowl Memorial Stadium • Memphis, TN	ESPN3	**W** 35–17	42,876	
September 3	7:00 p.m.	**SMU**	North Texas	Apogee Stadium • Denton, TX	ASN	**W** 34–21	24,718	
September 3	7:00 p.m.	San Jose State	**Tulsa**	Skelly Field at H. A. Chapman Stadium • Tulsa, OK	CBSSN	**W** 45–10	18,748	
^{#}Rankings from AP Poll released prior to game. All times are in Eastern Time.

=== Week 2 ===
Date	Time	Visiting team	Home team	Site	TV	Result	Attendance	Ref.
September 10	Noon	**UCF**	No. 5 Michigan	Michigan Stadium • Ann Arbor, MI	ABC	**L** 14–51	109,295	
September 10	Noon	**Cincinnati**	Purdue	Ross–Ade Stadium • West Lafayette, IN	BTN	**W** 38–20	33,068	
September 10	Noon	NC State	**East Carolina**	Dowdy–Ficklen Stadium • Greenville, NC	ESPNU	**W** 33–30	50,719	
September 10	Noon	Lamar	No. 6 **Houston**	TDECU Stadium • Houston, TX	ASN	**W** 42–0	39,402	
September 10	1:00 p.m.	Stony Brook	**Temple**	Lincoln Financial Field • Philadelphia, PA	ESPN3	**W** 38–0	22,296	
September 10	3:30 p.m.	**Connecticut**	**Navy**	Navy–Marine Corps Memorial Stadium • Annapolis, MD	CBSSN	**NAVY** 28–24	31,501	
September 10	3:30 p.m.	**SMU**	No. 23 Baylor	McLane Stadium • Waco, TX	FS1	**L** 13–40	45,499	
September 10	3:30 p.m.	**Tulsa**	No. 4 Ohio State	Ohio Stadium • Columbus, OH	ABC	**L** 3–48	104,410	
September 10	7:00 p.m.	Northern Illinois	**South Florida**	Raymond James Stadium • Tampa, FL	CBSSN	**W** 48–17	36,557	
September 10	8:00 p.m.	Southern	**Tulane**	Yulman Stadium • New Orleans, LA	ESPN3	**W** 66–21	27,179	
^{#}Rankings from AP Poll released prior to game. All times are in Eastern Time.

Date	Bye Week
September 10	Memphis

=== Week 3 ===
Date	Time	Visiting team	Home team	Site	TV	Result	Attendance	Ref.
September 15	7:30 p.m.	No. 6 **Houston**	**Cincinnati**	Nippert Stadium • Cincinnati, OH	ESPN	**HOU** 40–16	40,015	
September 17	Noon	**Temple**	Penn State	Beaver Stadium • University Park, PA	BTN	**L** 27–34	100,420	
September 17	Noon	Kansas	**Memphis**	Liberty Bowl Memorial Stadium • Memphis, TN	ESPNU	**W** 43–7	34,448	
September 17	1:30 p.m.	Virginia	**Connecticut**	Rentschler Field • East Hartford, CT	SNY	**W** 13–10	31,036	
September 17	2:00 p.m.	North Carolina A&T	**Tulsa**	Skelly Field at H. A. Chapman Stadium • Tulsa, OK	ESPN3	**W** 58–21	16,111	
September 17	3:30 p.m.	**South Florida**	Syracuse	Carrier Dome • Syracuse, NY	ESPN3	**W** 45–20	32,288	
September 17	4:00 p.m.	**East Carolina**	South Carolina	Williams-Brice Stadium • Columbia, SC	SEC Network	**L** 15–20	80,384	
September 17	7:00 p.m.	Maryland	**UCF**	Bright House Networks Stadium • Orlando, FL	CBSSN	**L** 24–30 ^{2OT}	43,197	
September 17	7:00 p.m.	**Navy**	**Tulane**	Yulman Stadium • New Orleans, LA	ASN	**NAVY** 21–14	21,503	
September 17	7:00 p.m.	Liberty	**SMU**	Gerald J. Ford Stadium • University Park, TX	ESPN3	**W** 29–14	22,127	
^{#}Rankings from AP Poll released prior to game. All times are in Eastern Time.

=== Week 4 ===
Date	Time	Visiting team	Home team	Site	TV	Result	Attendance	Ref.
September 23	8:00 p.m.	TCU	**SMU**	Gerald J. Ford Stadium • University Park, TX (Battle for the Iron Skillet)	ESPN	**L** 3–33	30,987	
September 24	Noon	No. 13 Florida State	**South Florida**	Raymond James Stadium • Tampa, FL	ABC	**L** 35–55	61,665	
September 24	Noon	Charlotte	**Temple**	Lincoln Financial Field • Philadelphia, PA	ASN	**W** 48–20	27,786	
September 24	12:30 p.m.	**East Carolina**	Virginia Tech	Lane Stadium • Blacksburg, VA	ACCN	**L** 17–54	63,712	
September 24	1:00 p.m.	Syracuse	**Connecticut**	Rentschler Field • East Hartford, CT	CBSSN	**L** 24–31	31,899	
September 24	3:30 p.m.	Miami (OH)	**Cincinnati**	Nippert Stadium • Cincinnati, OH (121st Battle for the Victory Bell)	ESPNews	**W** 27–20	38,112	
September 24	4:30 p.m.	**Tulsa**	Fresno State	Bulldog Stadium • Fresno, CA	MWTV	**W** 48–41 ^{2OT}	23,273	
September 24	7:00 p.m.	**UCF**	FIU	FIU Stadium • Miami, FL	BeIN Sports	**W** 53–14	18,524	
September 24	7:00 p.m.	No. 6 **Houston**	Texas State	Bobcat Stadium • San Marcos, TX	ESPNU	**W** 64–3	33,133	
September 24	8:00 p.m.	Bowling Green	**Memphis**	Liberty Bowl Memorial Stadium • Memphis, TN	ESPNews	**W** 77–3	38,713	
September 24	8:00 p.m.	Louisiana–Lafayette	**Tulane**	Yulman Stadium • New Orleans, LA	ESPN3	**W** 41–39 ^{4OT}	24,253	
^{#}Rankings from AP Poll released prior to game. All times are in Eastern Time.

Date	Bye Week
September 24	Navy

=== Week 5 ===
Date	Time	Visiting team	Home team	Site	TV	Result	Attendance	Ref.
September 29	8:00 p.m.	Connecticut	No. 6 **Houston**	TDECU Stadium • Houston, TX	ESPN	**HOU** 42–14	40,873	
October 1	Noon	UCF	**East Carolina**	Dowdy–Ficklen Stadium • Greenville, NC (rivalry)	CBSSN	**UCF** 47–29	46,042	
October 1	Noon	SMU	**Temple**	Lincoln Financial Field • Philadelphia, PA	ESPNews	**TEM** 45–20	22,401	
October 1	3:30 p.m.	Navy	Air Force	Falcon Stadium • Colorado Springs, CO (Commander-in-Chief's Trophy)	CBSSN	**L** 14–28	43,063	
October 1	3:30 p.m.	Tulane	UMass	Warren McGuirk Alumni Stadium • Hadley, MA	ASN	**W** 31–24	14,892	
October 1	7:00 p.m.	South Florida	**Cincinnati**	Nippert Stadium • Cincinnati, OH	ESPNU	**USF** 45–20	35,108	
October 1	7:00 p.m.	Memphis	No. 16 Ole Miss	Vaught–Hemingway Stadium • Oxford, MS	ESPN2	**L** 28–48	65,889	
^{#}Rankings from AP Poll released prior to game. All times are in Eastern Time.

Date	Bye Week
October 1	Tulsa

=== Week 6 ===
Date	Time	Visiting team	Home team	Site	TV	Result	Attendance	Ref.
October 6	8:00 p.m.	**Temple**	Memphis	Liberty Bowl Memorial Stadium • Memphis, TN	ESPN	**MEM** 34–27	34,743	
October 7	8:00 p.m.	**Tulane**	UCF	Bright House Networks Stadium • Orlando, FL	ESPNU	**Postponed**^{[a]}		
October 7	8:00 p.m.	**SMU**	Tulsa	Skelly Field at H. A. Chapman Stadium • Tulsa, OK	ESPN2	**TLSA** 43–40 ^{OT}	20,089	
October 8	11:30 a.m.	**Cincinnati**	Connecticut	Rentschler Field • East Hartford, CT	CBSSN	**CONN** 20–9	24,169	
October 8	Noon	**East Carolina**	South Florida	Raymond James Stadium • Tampa, FL	ESPNews	**USF** 38–22	30,397	
October 8	3:00 p.m.	No. 6 **Houston**	Navy	Navy–Marine Corps Memorial Stadium • Annapolis, MD	CBSSN	**NAVY** 46–40	34,531	
^{#}Rankings from AP Poll released prior to game. All times are in Eastern Time.

^{^[a]}The October 7th game in Orlando between Tulane and UCF was postponed due to Hurricane Matthew and rescheduled for November 5, a date which both teams had open.

=== Week 7 ===
Date	Time	Visiting team	Home team	Site	TV	Result	Attendance	Ref.
October 13	7:30 p.m.	No. 25 **Navy**	**East Carolina**	Dowdy–Ficklen Stadium • Greenville, NC	ESPN	**Postponed**^{[b]}		
October 14	8:00 p.m.	**Memphis**	**Tulane**	Yulman Stadium • New Orleans, LA	ESPNU	**MEM** 24–14	21,098	
October 15	7:00 p.m.	**Connecticut**	**South Florida**	Raymond James Stadium • Tampa, FL	CBSSN	**USF** 42–27	30,297	
October 15	7:00 p.m.	**Tulsa**	No. 13 **Houston**	TDECU Stadium • Houston, TX	ESPN2	**HOU** 38–31	38,221	
October 15	7:30 p.m.	**Temple**	**UCF**	Bright House Networks Stadium • Orlando, FL	ESPNU	**TEM** 26–25	38,299	
^{#}Rankings from AP Poll released prior to game. All times are in Eastern Time.

Date	Bye Week	
October 15	Cincinnati	SMU

^{^[b]}The October 13th game in Greenville, NC between Navy and East Carolina was postponed due because of flooding associated with Hurricane Matthew, the game will be rescheduled for November 19, a date which both teams had open.

=== Week 8 ===
Date	Time	Visiting team	Home team	Site	TV	Result	Attendance	Ref.
October 21	7:00 p.m.	**South Florida**	**Temple**	Lincoln Financial Field • Philadelphia, PA	ESPN	**TEM** 46–30	25,950	
October 22	Noon	**UCF**	**Connecticut**	Rentschler Field • East Hartford, CT (Civil Conflict)	ESPNews	**UCF** 24–16	28,008	
October 22	3:30 p.m.	**Memphis**	No. 24 **Navy**	Navy–Marine Corps Memorial Stadium • Annapolis, MD	CBSSN	**NAVY** 42–28	35,943	
October 22	3:45 p.m.	**Tulane**	**Tulsa**	Skelly Field at H. A. Chapman Stadium • Tulsa, OK	ESPNU	**TLSA** 50–27	22,349	
October 22	7:00 p.m.	**East Carolina**	**Cincinnati**	Nippert Stadium • Cincinnati, OH	CBSSN	**CIN** 31–19	32,022	
October 22	7:00 p.m.	No. 11 **Houston**	**SMU**	Gerald J. Ford Stadium • University Park, TX (rivalry)	ESPN2	**SMU** 38–16	25,079	
^{#}Rankings from AP Poll released prior to game. All times are in Eastern Time.

=== Week 9 ===
Date	Time	Visiting team	Home team	Site	TV	Result	Attendance	Ref.
October 28	7:00 p.m.	No. 22 **Navy**	South Florida	Raymond James Stadium • Tampa, FL	ESPN2	**USF** 52–45	31,824	
October 29	Noon	**UCF**	Houston	TDECU Stadium • Houston, TX	ESPNU	**HOU** 31–24	35,846	
October 29	Noon	**Connecticut**	East Carolina	Dowdy–Ficklen Stadium • Greenville, NC	ESPNews	**ECU** 41–3	41,370	
October 29	3:30 p.m.	**Cincinnati**	Temple	Lincoln Financial Field • Philadelphia, PA	CBSSN	**TEM** 34–13	29,763	
October 29	4:00 p.m.	**SMU**	Tulane	Yulman Stadium • New Orleans, LA	ESPNews	**SMU** 35–31	25,780	
October 29	8:00 p.m.	**Tulsa**	Memphis	Liberty Bowl Memorial Stadium • Memphis, TN	ESPNews	**TLSA** 59–30	36,894	
^{#}Rankings from AP Poll released prior to game. All times are in Eastern Time.

=== Week 10 ===
Date	Time	Visiting team	Home team	Site	TV	Result	Attendance	Ref.
November 4	7:00 p.m.	**Temple**	Connecticut	Rentschler Field • East Hartford, CT	ESPN2	**TEM** 21–0	22,316	
November 5	11:30 a.m.	Notre Dame	Navy	EverBank Field • Jacksonville, FL (Rip Miller Trophy)	CBS	**W** 28–27	50,867	
November 5	3:30 p.m.	BYU	Cincinnati	Nippert Stadium • Cincinnati, OH	CBSSN	**L** 3–20	37,522	
November 5	4:00 p.m.	**Memphis**	SMU	Gerald J. Ford Stadium • University Park, TX	ESPNews	**MEM** 51–7	24,379	
November 5	5:00 p.m.	**Tulane**	UCF	Bright House Networks Stadium • Orlando, FL	ESPN3	**UCF** 31–6	31,571	
November 5	8:00 p.m.	**East Carolina**	Tulsa	Skelly Field at H. A. Chapman Stadium • Tulsa, OK	ESPNews	**TLSA** 45–24	17,557	
^{#}Rankings from AP Poll released prior to game. All times are in Eastern Time.

Date	Bye Week	
November 5	South Florida	Houston

=== Week 11 ===
Date	Time	Visiting team	Home team	Site	TV	Result	Attendance	Ref.
November 12	Noon	**Tulsa**	**Navy**	Navy–Marine Corps Memorial Stadium • Annapolis, MD	CBSSN	**NAVY** 42–40	36,397	
November 12	Noon	**Cincinnati**	**UCF**	Bright House Networks Stadium • Orlando, FL	ESPNU	**UCF** 24–3	30,346	
November 12	Noon	**SMU**	**East Carolina**	Dowdy–Ficklen Stadium • Greenville, NC	ESPNews	**SMU** 55–31	42,908	
November 12	3:30 p.m.	**Tulane**	**Houston**	TDECU Stadium • Houston, TX	CBSSN	**HOU** 30–18	36,552	
November 12	7:00 p.m.	**South Florida**	**Memphis**	Liberty Bowl Memorial Stadium • Memphis, TN	ESPNU	**USF** 49–42	37,218	
^{#}Rankings from AP Poll released prior to game. All times are in Eastern Time.

Date	Bye Week	
November 12	Connecticut	Temple

=== Week 12 ===
Date	Time	Visiting team	Home team	Site	TV	Result	Attendance	Ref.
November 17	8:00 p.m.	No. 3 Louisville	**Houston**	TDECU Stadium • Houston, TX	ESPN	**W** 36–10	42,822	
November 18	8:00 p.m.	**Memphis**	**Cincinnati**	Nippert Stadium • Cincinnati, OH	CBSSN	**MEM** 34–7	25,796	
November 19	1:00 p.m.	**Connecticut**	Boston College	Alumni Stadium • Chestnut Hill, MA	ACCN Extra	**L** 0–30	36,220	
November 19	3:30 p.m.	**Temple**	**Tulane**	Yulman Stadium • New Orleans, LA	ASN	**TEM** 31–0	16,497	
November 19	4:00 p.m.	**Navy**	**East Carolina**	Dowdy–Ficklen Stadium • Greenville, NC	ESPNews	**NAVY** 66–31	39,480	
November 19	7:00 p.m.	**South Florida**	**SMU**	Gerald J. Ford Stadium • University Park, TX	CBSSN	**USF** 35–27	18,417	
November 19	8:00 p.m.	**Tulsa**	**UCF**	Bright House Networks Stadium • Orlando, FL	ESPNews	**TLSA** 35–20	35,141	
^{#}Rankings from AP Poll released prior to game. All times are in Eastern Time.

=== Week 13 ===
Date	Time	Visiting team	Home team	Site	TV	Result	Attendance	Ref.
November 25	Noon	No. 18 **Houston**	Memphis	Liberty Bowl Memorial Stadium • Memphis, TN	ABC	**MEM** 48–44	36,527	
November 25	8:30 p.m.	**Cincinnati**	Tulsa	Skelly Field at H. A. Chapman Stadium • Tulsa, OK	ESPNU	**TLSA** 40–37	18,550	
November 26	Noon	**UCF**	South Florida	Raymond James Stadium • Tampa, FL (War on I-4)	CBSSN	**USF** 48–31	36,056	
November 26	3:30 p.m.	**Navy**	SMU	Gerald J. Ford Stadium • University Park, TX (Gansz Trophy)	ESPNU	**NAVY** 75–31	21,283	
November 26	4:00 p.m.	**Tulane**	Connecticut	Rentschler Field • East Hartford, CT	ESPNews	**TULN** 38–13	20,764	
November 26	7:30 p.m.	**East Carolina**	Temple	Lincoln Financial Field • Philadelphia, PA	ESPNews	**TEM** 37–10	28,373	
^{#}Rankings from AP Poll released prior to game. All times are in Eastern Time.

=== American Athletic Conference Championship Game ===
Date	Time	Visiting team	Home team	Site	TV	Result	Attendance	Ref.
December 3	Noon	**Temple**	No. 20 **Navy**	Navy–Marine Corps Memorial Stadium • Annapolis, MD	ABC	**TEM** 34–10	22,815	
^{#}Rankings from AP Poll released prior to game. All times are in Eastern Time.

=== Week 15 ===
Date	Time	Visiting team	Home team	Site	TV	Result	Attendance	Ref.
December 10	3:00 p.m.	Army	**Navy**	M&T Bank Stadium • Baltimore, MD (117th Army–Navy Game/Commander-in-Chief's Trophy)	CBS	**L** 17–21	71,600	
^{#}Rankings from AP Poll released prior to game. All times are in Eastern Time.

== Bowl games ==
American Athletic Conference bowl games for the 2016 season are:

Bowl game	Date	Site	Television	Time (EST)	AAC team	Opponent	Score	Attendance
Las Vegas Bowl	December 17	Sam Boyd Stadium • Whitney, NV	ABC	3:30 p.m.	Houston	San Diego State	10–34	29,286
AutoNation Cure Bowl	December 17	Camping World Stadium • Orlando, FL	CBSSN	5:30 p.m.	UCF	Arkansas State	13–31	27,213
Miami Beach Bowl	December 19	Marlins Park • Miami, FL	ESPN	2:30 p.m.	Tulsa	Central Michigan	55–10	15,262
Marmot Boca Raton Bowl	December 20	FAU Stadium • Boca Raton, FL	ESPN	7:00 p.m.	Memphis	WKU	31–51	24,726
Lockheed Martin Armed Forces Bowl	December 23	Amon G. Carter Stadium • Fort Worth, TX	ESPN	4:30 p.m.	#25 Navy	Louisiana Tech	45–48	40,542
Military Bowl	December 27	Navy–Marine Corps Memorial Stadium • Annapolis, MD	ESPN	3:30 p.m.	#24 Temple	Wake Forest	26–34	26,656
Birmingham Bowl	December 29	Legion Field • Birmingham, Alabama	ESPN	2:00 p.m.	South Florida	South Carolina	46–39 ^{OT}	31,229

Rankings are from CFP Poll. All times Eastern Time Zone.

=== Selection of teams ===
- Bowl eligible: Houston, Memphis, Navy, South Florida, Temple, Tulsa, UCF
- Bowl-ineligible: Cincinnati, Connecticut, East Carolina, Tulane, SMU

== Records against FBS conferences ==
2016 records against FBS conferences

Through Dec 29, 2016

Conference	Record
ACC	4–6
Big Ten	1–4
Big 12	2–2
C-USA	3–2
Independents	2–3
MAC	4–0
Mountain West	2–2
SEC	1–2
Sun Belt	2–1
Total	21–22

=== The American vs. Power Conferences ===
Index to colors and formatting
American member won
American member loss

Date	Visitor	Home	Winning team	Opponent Conference
September 1	Tulane	Wake Forest	Wake Forest	ACC
September 3‡	#3 Oklahoma	#15 Houston	Houston	Big 12
September 10	Cincinnati	Purdue	Cincinnati	Big Ten
September 10	UCF	#5 Michigan	Michigan	Big Ten
September 10	NC State	East Carolina	East Carolina	ACC
September 10	SMU	#23 Baylor	Baylor	Big 12
September 10	Tulsa	#4 Ohio State	Ohio State	Big Ten
September 17	Maryland	UCF	Maryland	Big Ten
September 17	Virginia	Connecticut	Connecticut	ACC
September 17	East Carolina	South Carolina	South Carolina	SEC
September 17	Kansas	Memphis	Memphis	Big 12
September 17	South Florida	Syracuse	South Florida	ACC
September 17	Temple	Penn State	Penn State	Big Ten
September 24	Syracuse	Connecticut	Syracuse	ACC
September 24	East Carolina	Virginia Tech	Virginia Tech	ACC
September 24	TCU	SMU	TCU	Big 12
September 24	#13 Florida State	South Florida	Florida State	ACC
October 1	Memphis	#16 Ole Miss	Ole Miss	SEC
November 5‡	Notre Dame	Navy	Navy	IND
November 17	#3 Louisville	Houston	Houston	ACC
November 19	Connecticut	Boston College	Boston College	ACC
December 27‡	Wake Forest	#23 Temple	Wake Forest	ACC
December 29‡	South Carolina	#25 South Florida	South Florida	SEC

‡This game was played at a neutral site

== Players of the Week ==
Week	Offensive			Defensive			Special Teams		
Week	Player	Position	Team	Player	Position	Team	Player	Position	Team
Week 1	Greg Ward Jr.	QB	Houston	Trent Martin	LB	Tulsa	Brandon Wilson	CB	Houston
Week 2	Quinton Flowers	QB	USF	Alohi Gilman	LB/DB	Navy	Sherman Badie	RB	Tulane
Week 3	Greg Ward Jr.	QB	Houston	Steven Taylor	LB	Houston	Bobby Puyol	K	UConn
Week 4	Riley Ferguson	QB	Memphis	Jeremy Brady	S	Tulsa	Andrew DiRocco	K	Tulane
Week 5	Greg Ward Jr.	QB	Houston	Haason Reddick	DE	Temple	Adrian Killins	RB	UCF
Week 6	Will Worth	QB	Navy	Josiah Powell	LB	Navy	Bennett Moehring	K	Navy
Week 7	Will Worth	QB	Navy	Jarvis Pruitt	DE	SMU	Aaron Boumerhi	K	Temple
Week 8	James Flanders	RB	Tulsa	Shaquem Griffin	LB	UCF	Jake Elliott	K	Memphis
Week 9	Riley Ferguson	QB	Memphis	Drico Johnson	DB	UCF	Aaron Boumerhi	K	Temple
Week 10	Quinton Flowers	QB	USF	Horace Richardson	CB	SMU	Dane Roy	P	Houston
Week 11									
Week 12									

== Awards and honors ==
=== Conference awards ===
The following individuals received postseason honors as voted by the American Athletic Conference football coaches at the end of the season

2016 American Athletic Conference Individual Awards
Award	Recipient(s)
Offensive Player of the Year	Quinton Flowers
Defensive Player of the Year	Shaquem Griffin
Special Teams Player of the Year	Tony Pollard
Rookie of the Year	Ed Oliver
Coach of the Year	Ken Niumatalolo

2016 All-American Athletic Conference Football Teams
First Team		Second Team	
Offense	Defense	Offense	Defense
WR – Zay Jones, East Carolina; WR – Courtland Sutton, SMU; WR – Keevan Lucas, Tulsa; OT – Kofi Amichia, South Florida; OT – Dion Dawkins, Temple; OG – Adam West, Navy; OG – Black Belcher, Tulsa; C – Chandler Miller, Tulsa; TE – Daniel Montiel, Memphis; QB – Quinton Flowers, South Florida; RB – Marlon Mack, South Florida; K – Jake Elliott, Memphis; RS – Tony Pollard, Memphis	DL – Haason Reddick, Temple*; DL – Ed Oliver, Houston*; DL – Tanzel Smart, Tulane; DL Justin Lawler, SMU; LB – Shaquem Griffin, UCF; LB – Eric Wilson, Cincinnati; LB – Steven Taylor, Houston; LB – Genard Avery, Memphis; LB – Nico Marley, Tulane; CB Horace Richardson, SMU; CB – Howard Wilson, Houston; S – Darrion Millines, SMU; S – Obi Melifonwu, UConn; P – Spencer Smith, Memphis	WR – Noel Thomas, UConn; WR – Anthony Miller, Memphis; WR – Rodney Adams, South Florida; OT – Blake Copeland, Navy; OT – Evan Plagg, Tulsa; OG – Dominique Threatt, South Florida; OG – Tyler Bowling, Tulsa; C – Maurice Morris, Navy; TE – Mitchell Wilcox, South Florida; QB – Greg Ward Jr., Houston; RB – Jahad Thomas, Temple; RB – D'Angelo Brewer, Tulsa; K – Aaron Boumerhi, Temple; RS – D'Ernest Johnson, South Florida	DL – Jamiyus Pittman, UCF; DL – Cortez Broughton, Cincinnati; DL – Deadrin Senat, South Florida; DL – Praise Martin-Oguike, Temple; LB – Tyus Bowser, Houston; LB – Micah Thomas, Navy; LB – Auggie Sanchez, South Florida; LB – Avery Williams, Temple; CB – Shaquill Griffin, UCF; CB – Brandon Wilson, Houston; CB – Deatrick Nichols, South Florida; CB – Parry Nickerson, Tulane; S – Garrett Davis, Houston; S – Sean Chandler, Temple; P – Worth Gregory, ECU
^{^} - denotes unanimous selection Additional players added to the all-conference teams due to ties in the voting.

== NFL draft ==
The American had a conference-record 15 players selected in the 2017 NFL draft, which placed it as the fifth most prolific conference in the draft. The American made headlines by having more selections than the Big 12 Conference, a Power 5 Conference.

The following list includes all AAC players who were drafted in the 2017 NFL draft.

Player	Position	School	Draft Round	Round Pick	Overall Pick	Team
Haason Reddick	LB	Temple	1	13	13	Arizona Cardinals
Zay Jones	WR	East Carolina	2	5	37	Buffalo Bills
Tyus Bowser	OLB	Houston	2	15	47	Baltimore Ravens
Obi Melifonwu	S	UConn	2	24	56	Oakland Raiders
Dion Dawkins	G	Temple	2	31	63	Buffalo Bills
Shaquill Griffin	CB	Central Florida	3	26	90	Seattle Seahawks
Howard Wilson	CB	Houston	4	19	126	Cleveland Browns
Marlon Mack	RB	South Florida	4	36	143	Indianapolis Colts
Jake Elliott	K	Memphis	5	9	153	Cincinnati Bengals
Nate Hairston	CB	Temple	5	14	158	Indianapolis Colts
Rodney Adams	WR	South Florida	5	26	170	Minnesota Vikings
Michael Tyson	S	Cincinnati	6	3	187	Seattle Seahawks
Tanzel Smart	DT	Tulane	6	5	189	Los Angeles Rams
Brandon Wilson	CB	Houston	6	23	207	Cincinnati Bengals
Kofi Amichia	OT	South Florida	6	28	212	Green Bay Packers

== Attendance ==
Team	Stadium	Capacity	Game 1	Game 2	Game 3	Game 4	Game 5	Game 6	Game 7	Total	Average	% of Capacity
Cincinnati	Nippert Stadium	40,000	28,520	40,015†	38,112	35,108	32,022	37,522	25,796	237,095	33,870	84.68%
Connecticut	Pratt & Whitney Stadium at Rentschler Field	40,642	29,377	31,036	31,899†	24,169	28,008	22,316	20,764	187,569	26,795	65.93%
East Carolina	Dowdy–Ficklen Stadium	50,000	44,161	50,719†	46,042	41,370	42,908	39,480	—	264,680	44,113	88.23%
Houston	TDECU Stadium	40,000	39,402	40,873	38,221	35,846	36,552	42,822†	—	233,716	38,953	97.38%
Memphis	Liberty Bowl Memorial Stadium	59,308	42,876†	34,448	38,713	34,743	36,894	37,218	36,527	261,419	37,345	62.97%
Navy	Navy–Marine Corps Memorial Stadium	34,000	28,238	31,501	34,531	35,943	36,397†	—	—	166,610	33,322	98.01%
SMU	Gerald J. Ford Stadium	32,000	22,127	30,987†	25,079	24,379	18,417	21,283	—	142,272	23,712	74.10%
South Florida	Raymond James Stadium	65,890	35,976	36,557	61,665†	30,397	30,297	31,824	36,056	262,772	37,538	56.97%
Temple	Lincoln Financial Field	69,176	34,005†	22,296	27,786	22,401	25,950	29,763	28,373	190,574	27,225	39.36%
Tulane	Yulman Stadium	30,000	27,179†	21,503	24,253	21,098	25,780	16,497	—	136,310	22,718	75.73%
Tulsa	Skelly Field at H. A. Chapman Stadium	30,000	18,748	16,111	20,089	22,349†	17,557	18,550	—	113,404	18,900	63.00%
UCF	Bright House Networks Stadium	44,206	36,260	43,197	38,299†	31,571	30,346	35,141	—	214,814	35,802	80.99%

- Games highlighted in green were sell-outs
- †Season High

=== Attendance for neutral site games ===
- September 3 – Houston vs. Oklahoma, NRG Stadium: 71,016
- November 5 – Navy vs. Notre Dame, EverBank Field: 50,867
- December 10 – Navy vs. Army, M&T Bank Stadium: 71,600
