= Belay D. Reddick =

Dr. Belay D. Reddick
- Born: Belay Dwight Reddick; January 9, 1969 (age 57)
- Occupations: Mentorship, Youth Advocate, and Conflict Resolution Coach

Belay Dwight Reddick (born January 9, 1969) is a mentor coach, youth advocate, and conflict resolution expert. Reddick's inspirational and motivational open letter to young black men has been heard on several radio stations. His written work has appeared in various newspapers. Reddick began his advocacy career in prison. He is currently incarcerated at the Federal Correctional Institution Forrest City Low in Forrest City, Arkansas.

== Early life ==
Reddick grew up in Jacksonville, Florida. He attended Paxon Senior High School, where he was a member of the Mighty Eagles Marching Band. After high school, he studied at Florida Community College at Jacksonville, before going into ministry in October 1987. Two years later, at the age of 20, he was called to the pulpit of First Baptist Church in Immokalee, Florida. His pastoral experience was short-lived. To support himself, Reddick landed a position at WorldComm.

In 2004, Reddick was arrested on bank fraud charges. He pleaded guilty to manufacturing and passing counterfeit checks and received a twenty-year sentence in a federal prison.

== Advocacy career ==
While in prison, Reddick read a story in the Charlotte Observer about two fatherless black boys who were struggling to stay in school. He reached out to the newspaper and offered to help both students by writing them weekly inspirational letters. One of the students accepted his offer. A trusting relationship was developed, and as a result, the young man graduated from high school. Their book, There's No Danger in the Water: Encouraging black Men To Become Mentors, was published in August 2013.

== Life as a prisoner ==
In October 2012, Reddick published a column in the Florida Star about the value of young black lives. In August 2014, he led an inmate-drive to donate book bags and supplies to twenty-three under-resourced, under-privileged black boys in Peoria, Illinois. In September 2014, Reddick published a letter in the Peoria Journal Star about the importance of mentoring boys. In May 2015, he developed a conflict resolution intervention program in response to the high number of violent incidents involving other prisoners. On May 9, 2016, he co-hosted local leaders and senior White House officials at the Great Debate and Reentry Forum at the United States Penitentiary in Atlanta. In July 2016, he published an Op-Ed in the San Francisco Bay View on the Second Chance Pell Initiative.
