= Howard Wilson (American football) =

American football player (born 1995)

No. 23, 24
- Position: Cornerback

Personal information
- Born: October 30, 1995 (age 31); Dallas, Texas, U.S.
- Listed height: 6 ft 1 in (1.85 m)
- Listed weight: 184 lb (83 kg)

Career information
- High school: DeSoto (DeSoto, Texas)
- College: Houston
- NFL draft: 2017: 4th round, 126th overall pick

Career history
- Cleveland Browns (2017–2018); Houston Gamblers (2022)*; BC Lions (2022)*
- * Offseason or practice squad member only

Awards and highlights
- First-team All-AAC (2016)
- Stats at Pro Football Reference

Howard Wilson (born October 30, 1995) is an American former professional football cornerback. He played college football at Houston, and was selected by the Cleveland Browns in the fourth round of the 2017 NFL draft.

== Professional career ==
=== Cleveland Browns ===
Wilson was selected by the Cleveland Browns in the fourth round, 126th overall, in the 2017 NFL draft. He signed his four-year rookie contract with the Browns on May 10, 2017, a four-year deal reportedly worth $3 million. On May 13, 2017, on the second day of rookie minicamp, Wilson suffered a fractured patella which required surgery. Due to the injury, Wilson spent the entire 2017 season on the physically unable to perform list as he was never activated.

On June 12, 2018, Wilson had surgery to repair a left patellar tendon suffered the previous year when he broke his knee cap, which also required surgery. He was ruled out for his second season in a row, as he was placed on injured reserve the following day.

Wilson was waived by the Browns on April 1, 2019, without ever appearing in a game for the team.

After sitting out the 2019 NFL season, Wilson had a tryout with the Chicago Bears on August 20, 2020.

=== Houston Gamblers ===
Wilson was selected in the 10th round of the 2022 USFL draft by the Houston Gamblers. He was released on April 7, 2022, before the season began.

=== BC Lions ===
Wilson signed with the BC Lions of the Canadian Football League on April 8, 2022. He was released by the Lions on May 23, 2022.
