= Immokalee High School =

Coordinates: 26.4267451°N 81.4247994°W

Location
- 701 Immokalee Drive Immokalee, FL 34142; United States

Information
- Type: Public
- School district: Collier County Public Schools
- Principal: Daniel Boddison
- Staff: 84.67 (FTE)
- Enrollment: 2,055 (2023–2024)
- Student to teacher ratio: 24.27
- Colors: Red, White
- Mascot: Indian
- Website: https://ihs.collierschools.com/

Immokalee High School is a secondary education school located near Naples, in an unincorporated census-designated place in Collier County, Florida, United States. Immokalee is one of eight public high schools located in Collier County. Immokalee High School is part of the Collier County Public Schools.

== Athletics ==
Immokalee High School is one of the seven Collier County Athletic Conference members.

- Collier County Athletic Conference Football Champions in 2005, 2006 and 2011
- The Indians captured the 2004 2A State Championship in football. In 2012 the Indians were the 5A State Runner-up. The Indians claimed regional football championships in 2000, 2003, and 2017.
- The Immokalee boys' Track team captured the 2012 CCAA & 2A Regional Championships.
- The Immokalee boys' Soccer team lost the Regional Final in 2012 and 2013. The Indians captured the Regional title in 2014 & 2016 and were the class 5A state runner-up in 2015.

=== Fall sports ===
- Cross Country
- Football
- Golf
- Volleyball

=== Winter sports ===
- Soccer
- Basketball
- Wrestling

=== Spring sports ===
- Lacrosse
- Baseball
- Softball
- Tennis

== Notable alumni ==
- Mackensie Alexander (2013), former NFL player (Minnesota Vikings)
- Albert Bentley, former NFL player
- Aaron Henry, current college football coach
- Edgerrin James, former NFL player and 2021 Pro Football Hall of Fame Inductee
- Javarris James (2006), former NFL player
- J. C. Jackson (2014), cornerback for Los Angeles Chargers
- D'Ernest Johnson (2014), NFL player (Cleveland Browns)
- Ovince St. Preux (2001), wrestler and collegiate football player for the Tennessee Volunteers, MMA fighter
- Brian Rolle, former NFL player
- Deadrin Senat, NFL Player (Atlanta Falcons)

== Demographics ==
=== Gender ===
- Male: 939 (51.82%)
- Female: 873 (48.18%)

=== Ethnicity ===
- White: 26 (1.4%)
- Black: 308 (17%)
- Hispanic: 1,457 (80.4%)
- Multiracial: 9 (0.35%)
- Native American: 11 (0.61%)
- Asian: 1 (0.06%)
