= Deadrin Senat =

American football player (born 1994)

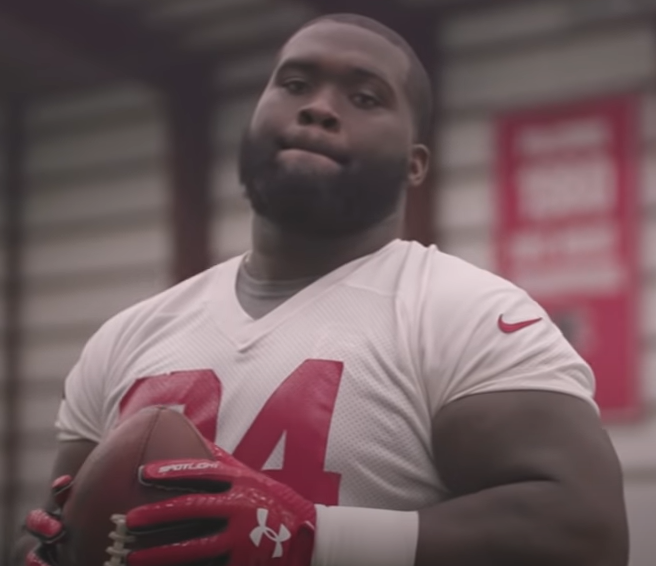
- Senat with the Atlanta Falcons in 2018

Profile
- Position: Nose tackle

Personal information
- Born: July 22, 1994 (age 32); Naples, Florida, U.S.
- Listed height: 6 ft 0 in (1.83 m)
- Listed weight: 328 lb (149 kg)

Career information
- High school: Immokalee (Immokalee, Florida)
- College: South Florida (2013–2017)
- NFL draft: 2018: 3rd round, 90th overall pick

Career history
- Atlanta Falcons (2018–2021); Tampa Bay Buccaneers (2022–2023); Baltimore Ravens (2024)*
- * Offseason or practice squad member only

Awards and highlights
- 2× All-AAC (2016, 2017); AAC All-Freshman (2015)

Career NFL statistics
- Total tackles: 52
- Sacks: 1.0
- Fumble recoveries: 1
- Stats at Pro Football Reference

Deadrin Senat (born July 22, 1994) is an American professional football nose tackle. He played college football at South Florida, and was selected by the Atlanta Falcons in the third round of the 2018 NFL draft.

== College career ==
Initially Senat committed to Florida State early, but later decommitted early so that he could explore his options. After his senior year, Senat was named to the All-Atlantic Coast Conference First-team. Senat was also invited to the 2018 East–West Shrine Game, along with teammates Quinton Flowers and D'Ernest Johnson. This was the first year 3 players from the Bulls were invited to the East–West Shrine Game.

== Professional career ==
=== Pre-draft ===
On November 30, 2017, it was reported that Senat had accepted his invitation to play in the East–West Shrine Game. Senat impressed scouts during East–West Shrine Game practices and improved his draft stock. Senat sustained a minor knee strain during practice and was unable to play in the East–West Shrine Game. He also received an invitation to play in the 2018 Senior Bowl, but declined due to his injury. Senat attended the NFL Scouting Combine and completed all of the combine and positional drills.

External videos
- Deadrin Senat's NFL Combine Workout
- Deadrin Senat's 40-yard dash

On March 26, 2018, Senat participated at South Florida's pro day but opted to stand on his combine numbers and only performed positional drills. At the conclusion of the pre-draft process, Senat was projected to be a third-round pick by NFL draft experts and scouts. He was ranked as the eighth-best defensive tackle prospect in the draft by DraftScout.com and was ranked the ninth-best defensive tackle by Scouts Inc.

Pre-draft measurables
Height	Weight	Arm length	Hand span	40-yard dash	10-yard split	20-yard split	20-yard shuttle	Three-cone drill	Vertical jump	Broad jump	Bench press
6 ft 0 in (1.83 m)	314 lb (142 kg)	31 5/8 in (0.80 m)	9 3/4 in (0.25 m)	5.16 s	1.76 s	3.01 s	4.79 s	7.77 s	26 in (0.66 m)	8 ft 4 in (2.54 m)	35 reps
All values from NFL Combine

=== Atlanta Falcons ===
The Atlanta Falcons selected Senat in the third round (90th overall) of the 2018 NFL draft. Senat was the ninth defensive tackle drafted in 2018. On May 10, 2018, the Falcons signed Senat to a four-year, $3.42 million contract that included a signing bonus of $817,960. On August 8, 2021, Senat was waived/injured and placed on injured reserve.

External videos
- Falcons draft Deadrin Senat 90th overall

Senat was released on November 8, 2021.

=== Tampa Bay Buccaneers ===
On April 21, 2022, Senat signed with the Tampa Bay Buccaneers. He was waived on August 30, 2022, and signed to the practice squad the next day. He was promoted to the active roster on September 21.

Senat was waived on August 28, 2023, then re-signed to the practice squad on September 20. He was promoted to the active roster on December 16. Senat was released on January 5, 2024, and re-signed to the practice squad four days later. He was not signed to a reserve/future contract after the season and thus became a free agent when his practice squad contract expired.

=== Baltimore Ravens ===
On May 28, 2024, Senat signed with the Baltimore Ravens. He was released on August 27.
