= Kofi Amichia =

American football player (born 1994)

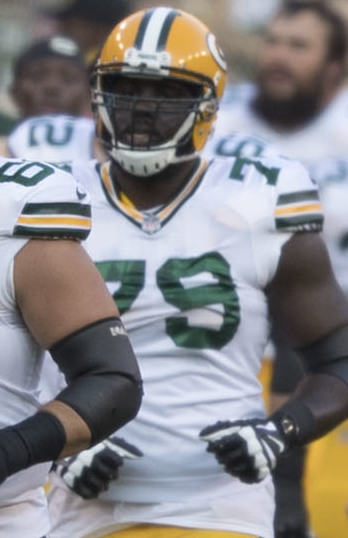
- Amichia with the Green Bay Packers in 2017

No. 79
- Position: Offensive tackle

Personal information
- Born: July 29, 1994 (age 32); East Point, Georgia, U.S.
- Listed height: 6 ft 4 in (1.93 m)
- Listed weight: 305 lb (138 kg)

Career information
- High school: McEachern (Powder Springs, Georgia)
- College: South Florida
- NFL draft: 2017: 6th round, 212th overall pick

Career history
- Green Bay Packers (2017–2018)*; Baltimore Ravens (2018–2019)*; Carolina Panthers (2019); San Francisco 49ers (2019–2020)*
- * Offseason or practice squad member only

Awards and highlights
- First-team All-AAC (2016)
- Stats at Pro Football Reference

Kofi Kaku Amichia (born July 29, 1994) is an American former professional football offensive tackle. He played college football at South Florida, and was selected by the Green Bay Packers in the sixth round of the 2017 NFL draft.

== College career ==
Amichia attended the University of South Florida, where he played on the South Florida Bulls football team from 2012 to 2016. He was named first-team All-American Athletic Conference as a senior in 2016.

== Professional career ==
External videos
- Amichia gets drafted by Green Bay

Pre-draft measurables
Height	Weight	Arm length	Hand span	40-yard dash	10-yard split	20-yard split	Vertical jump	Broad jump	Bench press	Wonderlic
6 ft 3 5/8 in (1.92 m)	302 lb (137 kg)	33 3/4 in (0.86 m)	10 1/8 in (0.26 m)	4.99 s	1.74 s	2.82 s	33.5 in (0.85 m)	9 ft 6 in (2.90 m)	32 reps	31
All values are from Pro Day

=== Green Bay Packers ===
Amichia was selected by the Green Bay Packers with the 212th overall pick in the sixth round of the 2017 NFL draft. On May 5, 2017, he signed a contract with the Packers. On September 2, Amichia was released by the Packers during final roster cuts. He was re–signed to the team's practice squad the following day. Amichia remained on the Packers' practice squad for the entire regular season. On January 3, 2018, he re-signed with the Packers.

On September 1, 2018, Amichia was waived by the Packers.

=== Baltimore Ravens ===
On October 24, 2018, Amichia was signed to the Baltimore Ravens' practice squad. He signed a reserve/future contract with the Ravens on January 8, 2019. Amichia was waived by Baltimore on May 16.

=== Carolina Panthers ===
On May 29, 2019, Amichia signed with the Carolina Panthers. He was waived/injured during final roster cuts on August 30, and reverted to the team's injured reserve list the next day. Amichia was waived from injured reserve on September 24.

=== San Francisco 49ers ===
On December 11, 2019, Amichia was signed to the San Francisco 49ers' practice squad. He re-signed with the 49ers on February 5, 2020. Amichia was waived by San Francisco on August 29.

== Personal life ==
Amichia is the son of Ghanaian immigrants.
