= J. C. Jackson =

American football player (born 1995)

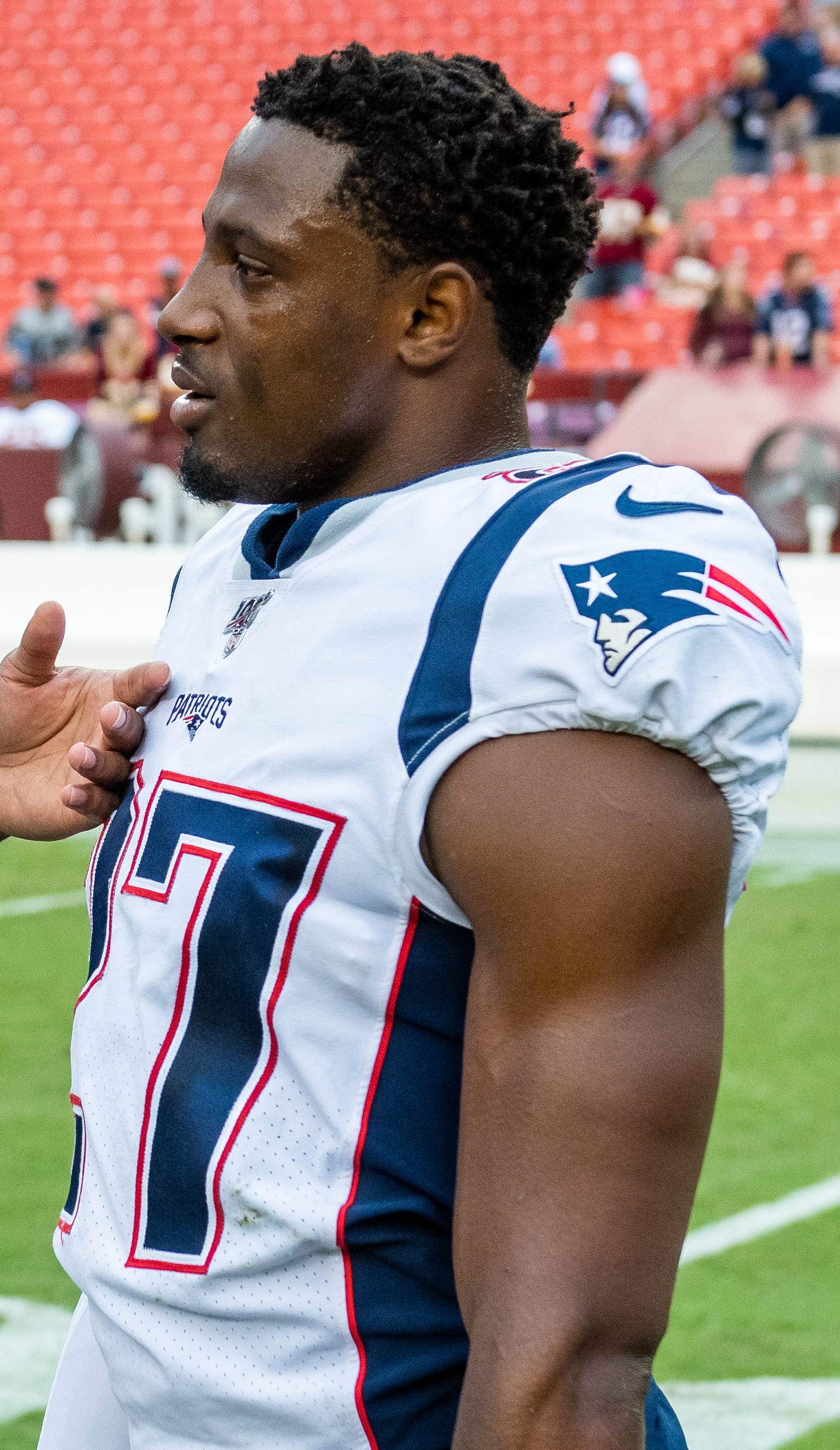
- Jackson with the New England Patriots in 2019

Profile
- Position: Cornerback

Personal information
- Born: November 17, 1995 (age 31); Immokalee, Florida, U.S.
- Listed height: 5 ft 10 in (1.78 m)
- Listed weight: 198 lb (90 kg)

Career information
- High school: Immokalee
- College: Florida (2014); Riverside City (2015); Maryland (2016–2017)
- NFL draft: 2018: undrafted

Career history
- New England Patriots (2018–2021); Los Angeles Chargers (2022–2023); New England Patriots (2023)

Awards and highlights
- Super Bowl champion (LIII); Second-team All-Pro (2021); Pro Bowl (2021)

Career NFL statistics
- Total tackles: 201
- Forced fumbles: 1
- Fumble recoveries: 3
- Pass deflections: 64
- Interceptions: 26
- Defensive touchdowns: 1
- Stats at Pro Football Reference

Jerald Christopher Jackson (born November 17, 1995) is an American professional football cornerback in the National Football League (NFL). He played college football for the Maryland Terrapins and signed with the New England Patriots as an undrafted free agent in 2018. Jackson earned Pro Bowl and second-team All-Pro honors during the 2021 season, in addition to being a member of the team that won Super Bowl LIII. After his rookie contract expired in 2022, he joined the Los Angeles Chargers before being traded back to the Patriots in 2023.

== Early life ==
Jackson attended Immokalee High School, where he played high school football. He was a four-star recruit coming out of high school and ranked as the 20th-best wide receiver in the class of 2014 by 247Sports. He committed to play football at the University of Florida.

== College career ==
=== Florida ===
Jackson began his college career with the Florida Gators, but injured his shoulder in the opening game and did not play for the rest of the season. He was able to use this as a redshirt year. After being acquitted of an armed robbery charge, he did not return to Florida.

=== Riverside CC ===
Following his acquittal, Jackson left Florida and transferred to Riverside City College.

=== Maryland ===
While Jackson was a student at Riverside, college teams including the Michigan Wolverines and Penn State Nittany Lions expressed an interest in recruiting him. He began practicing with the Maryland Terrapins in April 2016 and transferred there for the 2016 season. After the 2017 season, Jackson announced he was forgoing his senior season and declaring for the 2018 NFL draft.

== Professional career ==
=== Pre-draft ===
Although Jackson was talented and was also found not guilty for his arrest as a freshman at Florida, it was speculated teams had concerns with him given his past. He participated at the NFL Scouting Combine and had an overall impressive performance, enough for NFL analyst Bucky Brooks to call him one of the defensive back winners at the NFL Combine. During the NFL Combine, Jackson measured at 5'10", surprising many as he looked taller and was usually listed at 6'1". NFL draft analysts projected Jackson to be selected on day three anywhere from the fourth to seventh round.

"Jackson's success at two quality programs is a testament to his legitimate NFL talent. While shorter than ideal and coming with obvious off-field concerns, he is a draft-worthy commodity with the frame, physicality and ball skills to handle nickel duties, projecting as a mid-Day 3 pick."

— Rob Rang (DraftScout.com)

Pre-draft measurables
Height	Weight	Arm length	Hand span	40-yard dash	10-yard split	20-yard split	20-yard shuttle	Three-cone drill	Vertical jump	Broad jump	Bench press
5 ft 9 3/4 in (1.77 m)	201 lb (91 kg)	31 1/2 in (0.80 m)	8 1/8 in (0.21 m)	4.46 s	1.54 s	2.59 s	4.28 s	6.92 s	35 1/2 in (0.90 m)	10 ft 0 in (3.05 m)	14 reps

=== New England Patriots (first stint) ===
==== 2018 ====
On May 11, 2018, the New England Patriots signed Jackson to a three—year, $1.72 million contract that includes a signing bonus of $10,000.

" "The kid can play. I remember asking him in the middle of training camp, ‘Why the hell weren’t you drafted?'"

— Jason McCourty (on J.C. Jackson 2018)

He entered training camp slated as a backup and a special teams player and competed to maintain a roster spot among Cyrus Jones, Jonathan Jones, Duke Dawson, and fellow rookie Keion Crossen. He immediately impressed coaches and was given first-team reps in OTAs and spring training. On August 30, 2018, Jackson intercepted two pass attempts thrown by Kyle Lauletta to wide receiver Kalif Raymond during a 12–17 win against the New York Giants in the last preseason game before final roster cuts. His performance cemented his roster spot and he was listed as the sixth cornerback on the depth chart to begin the season, behind Stephon Gilmore, Eric Rowe, Jonathan Jones, Jason McCourty, and Duke Dawson.

He began the season as a healthy scratch and remained inactive for the first two games (Weeks 1–2). In Week 2, No. 2 starting cornerback Eric Rowe was benched for Jason McCourty and would remain inactive for the next three games (Week 3–5) due to a groin injury. Head coach Bill Belichick would promote Jackson to the fourth cornerback on the depth chart entering Week 3. On September 23, 2018, Jackson made his professional regular season debut and recorded one solo tackle during a 10–26 loss at the Detroit Lions. In Week 4, Jackson had one pass deflection and had the first interception of his career on a pass by Ryan Tannehill to wide receiver Albert Wilson as the Patriots routed the Miami Dolphins 7–38. He was inactive as a healthy scratch during a 40–43 victory against the Kansas City Chiefs in Week 6 after Eric Rowe returned from injury and the Patriots selecting Keion Crossen as the fifth cornerback due to his return skills on special teams. On October 21, 2018, he made one solo tackle, one pass deflection, and intercepted a pass by Mitchell Trubisky to wide receiver Josh Bellamy during a 38–31 win at the Chicago Bears. On October 31, 2018, the Patriots officially placed Eric Rowe on injured reserve for the rest of the season due to a groin injury, subsequently moving Jackson to the fourth cornerback on the depth chart. Entering Week 12, Jackson had surpassed Jonathan Jones on the depth chart to become the third cornerback behind Stephon Gilmore and Jason McCourty and also earned the role as the starting nickelback..

On December 2, 2018, Jackson earned his the first start of his career, placed at nickelback, and recorded four solo tackles and made one pass deflection during a 24–10 win against the Minnesota Vikings. He started in Week 15 as the No. 2 starting cornerback, supplanting Jason McCourty, with McCourty moving to nickelback. In Week 16, Jackson had a pass deflection and had his third pick of the season on a pass Josh Allen threw to wide receiver Deonte Thompson as the Patriots defeated the Buffalo Bills 12–24. The following week, he set a season-high with seven combined tackles (five solo) and had one pass break-up during a 38–3 win against the New York Jets in Week 17. He completed his rookie season with 24 combined tackles (22 solo), six passes defended, and three interceptions in 13 games and five starts.

The New England Patriots finished in first place in the AFC East with an 11–5 record in 2018, clinching a first-round bye. On January 13, 2019, Jackson appeared in the first playoff game of his career, as the third cornerback behind starters Stephon Gilmore and Jason McCourty, and recorded four combined tackles (three solo) and two pass deflections during a 41–28 victory against the Los Angeles Chargers in the Divisional Round. The following week, Jackson started in the AFC Championship Game, but was limited to one solo tackle as the Patriots won in overtime 37–31 at the Kansas City Chiefs. On February 3, 2019, Jackson appeared in Super Bowl LIII and recorded two combined tackles (one solo) to defeat the Los Angeles Rams 13–3 to earn his first Super Bowl ring.

==== 2019 ====
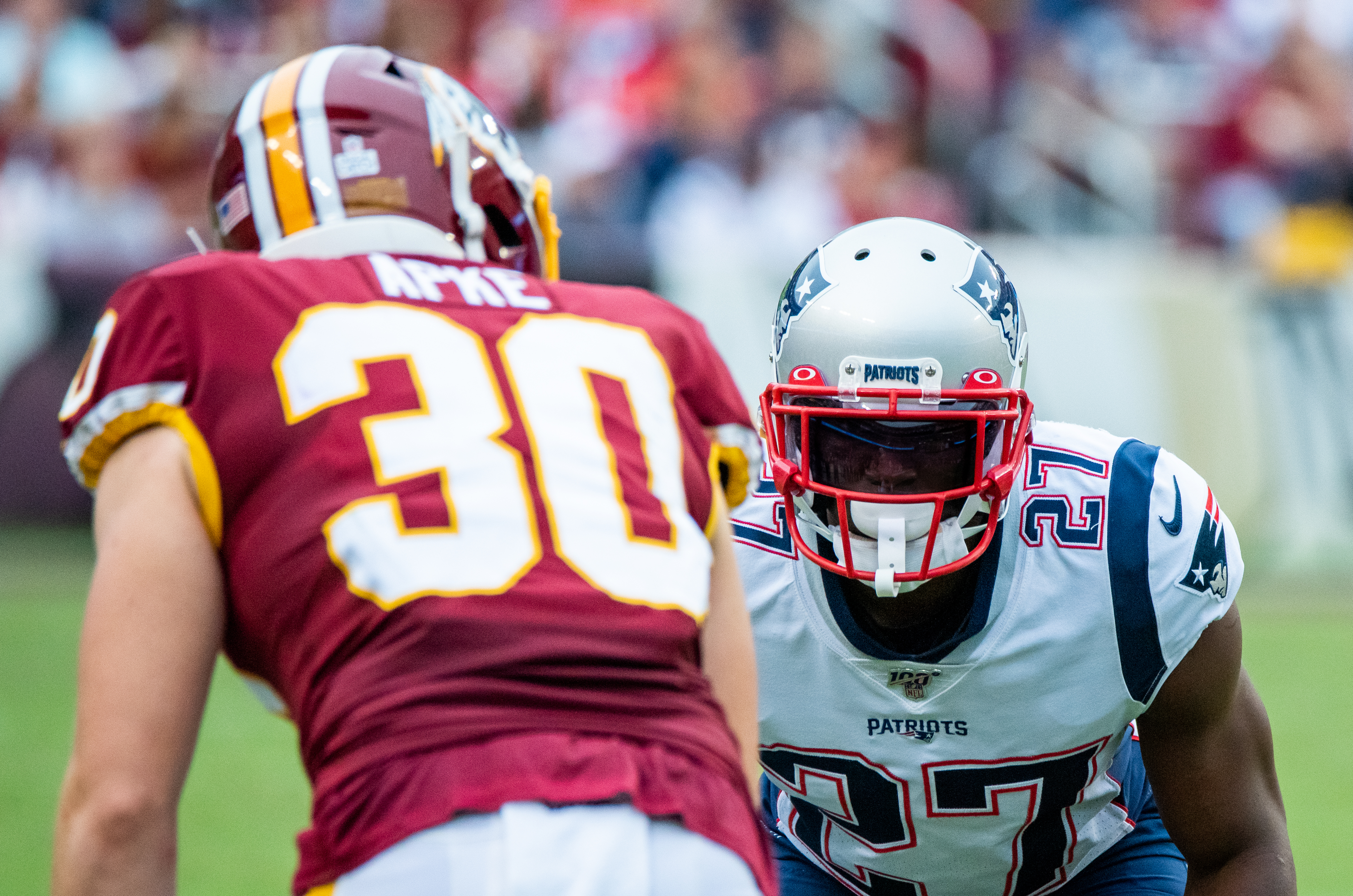
Jackson in a 2019 game against the Washington Redskins

In 2019, Jackson again made the Patriots' 53-man roster. In week 4 against the Buffalo Bills, Jackson intercepted quarterback Josh Allen twice and blocked a punt which was recovered by teammate Matthew Slater for a touchdown in the 16–10 win. In week 14 against the Kansas City Chiefs, Jackson recorded his third interception of the season off a pass thrown by Patrick Mahomes during the 23–16 loss. In the Patriots' 34–13 win over the Cincinnati Bengals, Jackson intercepted quarterback Andy Dalton twice. All of Jackson's career interceptions to date have come on pass attempts of at least 15 yards. He finished the 2019 season with 36 total tackles (29 solo), five interceptions, and ten passes defended.

==== 2020 ====
In Week 1 playing in a game against the Miami Dolphins, Jackson recorded his first interception of the season off a pass thrown by Ryan Fitzpatrick late in the fourth quarter to secure a 21–11 Patriots' win. In Week 6 against the Denver Broncos, Jackson intercepted a pass thrown by Drew Lock during the 18–12 loss. In Week 7 against the San Francisco 49ers, Jackson recorded another interception, this time off a pass thrown by Jimmy Garoppolo, during the 33–6 loss. In Week 8 against the Buffalo Bills, Jackson recorded an interception off a pass thrown by Josh Allen during the 24–21 loss. This was Jackson's third interception in three games. In Week 9 against the New York Jets, Jackson recorded another interception off a pass thrown by Joe Flacco in the fourth quarter after allowing two long touchdown passes from Flacco to wide receiver Breshad Perriman earlier in the game during the 30–27 win. In Week 10 against the Baltimore Ravens, Jackson recorded another interception from Lamar Jackson, setting a new franchise record for games in a row with an interception with five. This interception prevented the Ravens from scoring to end the first half and helped the Patriots earn a 23–17 upset victory. In Week 17 against the Jets, Jackson recorded his 9th interception of the season off a pass thrown by Sam Darnold during the 28–14 win. He finished the 2020 season with 40 total tackles (34 solo), nine interceptions, 14 passes defended, and three fumble recoveries. He was ranked 49th by his fellow players on the NFL Top 100 Players of 2021.

==== 2021 ====
On March 17, 2021, Jackson received a second-round restricted free agent tender worth $3.384 million from the Patriots. He signed a one-year contract on April 16.

Jackson was named AFC Defensive Player of the Month for November. He finished the season with eight interceptions, including his first career pick six, and a league-leading 23 pass deflections. He was selected for the Pro Bowl, along with teammates Matthew Judon and Matthew Slater. He was also named a second-team All-Pro. He was ranked 20th by his fellow players on the NFL Top 100 Players of 2022.

=== Los Angeles Chargers ===
On March 16, 2022, Jackson signed a five-year, $82.5 million contract with the Los Angeles Chargers. In August, he underwent ankle surgery, which forced him to miss the preseason and the season opener against the Las Vegas Raiders. He made his Chargers debut the following week in a 27–24 loss to the Chiefs.

Jackson struggled while playing for the Chargers, leading to him being benched for Michael Davis in the Week 6 Monday Night Football matchup with the Broncos. He returned the following week against the Seattle Seahawks, but suffered a non-contact patellar tendon rupture that ended his season. He made five appearances in the 2022 season.

=== New England Patriots (second stint) ===
On October 5, 2023, the Chargers traded Jackson and a 2025 seventh-round pick to the Patriots in exchange for a 2025 sixth-round pick, following an injury to Christian Gonzalez. Jackson wore 29 as his old number 27 was already worn by Myles Bryant. He was placed on the reserve/non-football illness list on December 19. He appeared in ten games total in the 2023 season with both the Chargers and Patriots. He finished with 28 total tackles (25 solo), one interception, and nine passes defended. He was released on March 1, 2024.

On August 23, 2024, Jackson was suspended one game by the NFL as a repercussion for his criminal speeding charge.

== NFL career statistics ==
Legend
	Won the Super Bowl
	Led the league
**Bold**	Career high

=== Regular season ===
Year	Team	Games		Tackles				Interceptions						Fumbles		
Year	Team	GP	GS	Cmb	Solo	Ast	Sck	Int	Yds	Avg	Lng	TD	PD	FF	FR	Yds
2018	NE	13	5	23	21	2	0.0	3	9	3.0	9	0	6	0	0	0
2019	NE	16	6	34	27	7	0.0	5	39	7.8	19	0	10	0	0	0
2020	NE	16	12	37	31	6	0.0	**9**	80	8.9	30	0	14	0	**3**	0
2021	NE	**17**	**17**	**58**	**44**	**14**	0.0	8	**92**	**11.5**	**88**	**1**	**23**	**1**	0	0
2022	LAC	5	5	15	12	3	0.0	0	0	0.0	0	0	2	0	0	0
2023	LAC	2	2	3	3	0	0.0	1	9	9.0	9	0	3	0	0	0
2023	NE	8	6	25	22	3	0.0	0	0	0.0	0	0	6	0	0	0
Career		77	52	201	166	35	0.0	26	229	8.8	88	1	64	1	3	0

=== Postseason ===
Year	Team	Games		Tackles				Interceptions						Fumbles		
Year	Team	GP	GS	Cmb	Solo	Ast	Sck	Int	Yds	Avg	Lng	TD	PD	FF	FR	Yds
2018	NE	**3**	**1**	**7**	**5**	**2**	0.0	0	0	0.0	0	0	**2**	0	0	0
2019	NE	1	**1**	1	1	0	0.0	0	0	0.0	0	0	1	0	0	0
2021	NE	1	**1**	6	**5**	1	0.0	0	0	0.0	0	0	0	0	0	0
Career		5	3	14	11	3	0.0	0	0	0.0	0	0	3	0	0	0

== Personal life ==
On April 18, 2015, Jackson was arrested in connection with an armed robbery. He was later formally charged with three counts of home invasion with a deadly weapon and one count of burglary of an occupied dwelling. On November 14, 2015, Jackson was found not guilty of all charges.

County commissioners in Jackson's home county of Collier County, Florida, declared April 9, 2019, "J. C. Jackson Day" in his honor.

On December 19, 2022, Jackson was arrested in Dartmouth, Massachusetts, following a 'non-violent family issue'.

On September 25, 2023, a warrant was issued for Jackson's arrest in Massachusetts. The warrant was a result of Jackson not appearing in court for a probation violation hearing, which stemmed from a criminal speeding arrest in 2021.
