= Tanzel Smart =

American football player (born 1994)

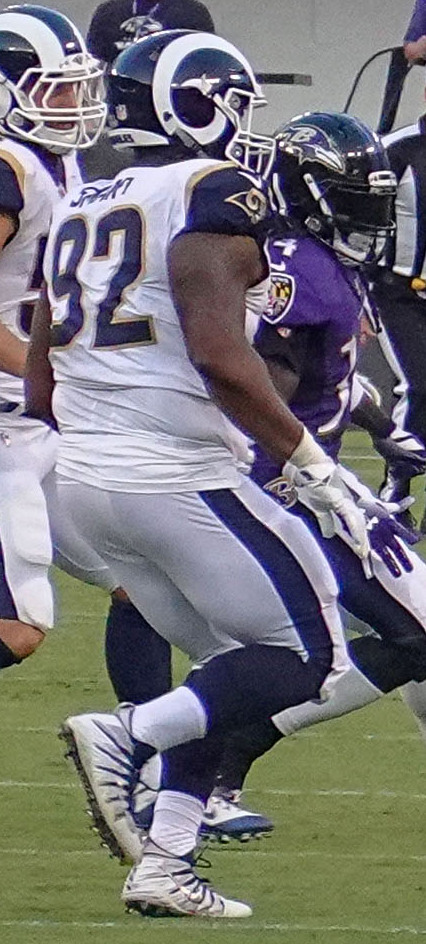
- Smart with the Los Angeles Rams in 2018

Tennessee Titans
- Title: Assistant defensive line coach

Personal information
- Born: November 6, 1994 (age 32); Baton Rouge, Louisiana, U.S.
- Listed height: 6 ft 1 in (1.85 m)
- Listed weight: 295 lb (134 kg)

Career information
- Position: Defensive tackle (No. 92, 79)
- High school: Scotlandville Magnet (Baton Rouge)
- College: Tulane (2013–2016)
- NFL draft: 2017: 6th round, 189th overall pick

Career history

Playing
- Los Angeles Rams (2017–2019); Buffalo Bills (2020)*; Cleveland Browns (2020)*; New York Jets (2020–2023)
- * Offseason or practice squad member only

Coaching
- Dallas Cowboys (2025) Defensive quality control assistant; Tennessee Titans (2026–present) Assistant defensive line coach

Awards and highlights
- First-team All-AAC (2016)

Career NFL statistics
- Total tackles: 31
- Pass deflections: 1
- Stats at Pro Football Reference

Tanzel Eric Smart Jr. (born November 6, 1994) is an American professional football coach and former defensive tackle who is an assistant defensive line coach for the Tennessee Titans of the National Football League (NFL). He played college football for the Tulane Green Wave, and was selected by the Los Angeles Rams in the sixth round of the 2017 NFL draft. He also played for the Buffalo Bills, Cleveland Browns, and New York Jets.

== College career ==
Smart attended and played college football for Tulane University in New Orleans, Louisiana.

== Playing career ==
Pre-draft measurables
Height	Weight	Arm length	Hand span	Wingspan	40-yard dash	10-yard split	20-yard split	20-yard shuttle	Three-cone drill	Vertical jump	Broad jump	Bench press
6 ft 0 5/8 in (1.84 m)	296 lb (134 kg)	32 7/8 in (0.84 m)	9 5/8 in (0.24 m)	6 ft 8 3/4 in (2.05 m)	5.22 s	1.83 s	3.00 s	4.57 s	7.53 s	27.0 in (0.69 m)	8 ft 9 in (2.67 m)	25 reps
All values from NFL Combine/Pro Day

=== Los Angeles Rams ===
Smart was selected in the sixth round with the 189th overall pick by the Los Angeles Rams in the 2017 NFL draft.

On May 15, 2020, Smart was released by the Rams.

=== Buffalo Bills ===
On August 16, 2020, Smart signed with the Buffalo Bills. He was waived by Buffalo on September 5.

=== Cleveland Browns ===
On September 11, 2020, Smart was signed to the practice squad of the Cleveland Browns. He was released by the Browns on September 22.

=== New York Jets ===
On October 14, 2020, Smart was signed to the New York Jets' practice squad. He was elevated to the active roster on November 9 and December 19 for the team's weeks 9 and 15 games against the New England Patriots and Rams, and reverted to the practice squad after each game. He was promoted to the active roster on January 2, 2021.

On August 31, 2021, Smart was waived by the Jets and re-signed to the practice squad the next day. He signed a reserve/future contract with the Jets on January 10, 2022.

On August 30, 2022, Smart was waived by the Jets and signed to the practice squad the next day. He signed a reserve/future contract on January 9, 2023.

On August 29, 2023, Smart was released by the Jets and re-signed to the practice squad. On October 31, Smart was signed to the Jets' active roster. He was waived on November 13, and re-signed to the practice squad two days later. Smart was signed to the active roster on November 18, but released two days later and re-signed back with the practice squad. He signed a reserve/futures contract with the Jets on January 9, 2024.

Smart was released by the Jets on August 27, 2024.

== Coaching career ==
On February 14, 2025, Smart was announced as a defensive quality control assistant on Brian Schottenheimer's new Dallas Cowboys coaching staff.
