= Brian Rolle =

American gridiron football player (born 1988)

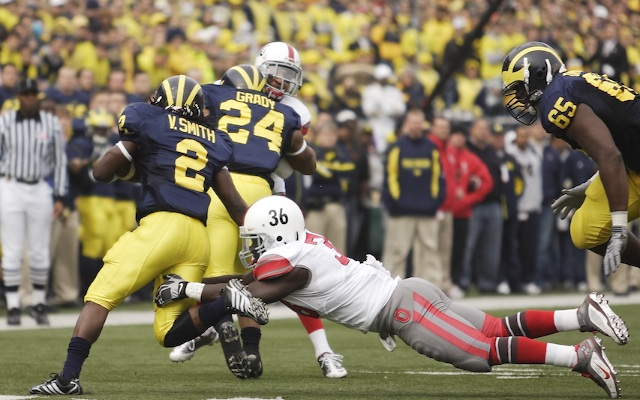
- Rolle attempts a tackle on Vincent Smith in 2009

No. 59, 52, 36
- Position: Linebacker

Personal information
- Born: November 20, 1988 (age 37); Immokalee, Florida, U.S.
- Listed height: 5 ft 10 in (1.78 m)
- Listed weight: 240 lb (109 kg)

Career information
- High school: Immokalee
- College: Ohio State
- NFL draft: 2011: 6th round, 193rd overall pick

Career history
- Philadelphia Eagles (2011–2012); Pittsburgh Steelers (2013)*; Toronto Argonauts (2015)
- * Offseason or practice squad member only

Awards and highlights
- First-team All-Big Ten (2010)

Career NFL statistics
- Total tackles: 58
- Sacks: 1.0
- Forced fumbles: 1
- Fumble recoveries: 1
- Defensive touchdowns: 1
- Stats at Pro Football Reference

Brian Rolle (born November 20, 1988) is an American former professional football player who was a linebacker for the Philadelphia Eagles of the National Football League (NFL). He was selected by the Eagles in the sixth round of the 2011 NFL draft. He played college football for the Ohio State Buckeyes. Rolle was a two-year starter at middle linebacker for Ohio State and led the Buckeyes with 76 tackles as a senior.

== Professional career ==
Pre-draft measurables
Height	Weight	Arm length	Hand span	Wingspan	40-yard dash	10-yard split	20-yard split	20-yard shuttle	Three-cone drill	Vertical jump	Broad jump	Bench press
5 ft 9 5/8 in (1.77 m)	229 lb (104 kg)	31 in (0.79 m)	10 3/8 in (0.26 m)	6 ft 2 in (1.88 m)	4.53 s	1.52 s	2.71 s	4.26 s	6.89 s	33.0 in (0.84 m)	9 ft 7 in (2.92 m)	28 reps
All values from 2011 NFL Scouting Combine/Pro Day

Rolle was projected to be drafted in the fifth round of the 2011 NFL draft.

=== Philadelphia Eagles ===
Rolle was selected by the Philadelphia Eagles in the sixth round (193rd overall) of the 2011 NFL draft. He signed a four-year contract with the team on July 27, 2011. He became the Eagles starting weak-side linebacker before week 4 and then started all of Philadelphia's remaining 13 games. He scored his first career touchdown in week 9, after he stripped Chicago Bears' RB Matt Forte and picked up the ball and scored. He also recorded a sack against Miami in week 13. He was released by the Eagles October 2, 2012 for poor special teams play.

=== Pittsburgh Steelers ===
Rolle was signed to a futures/reserve contract on January 9, 2013 by the Pittsburgh Steelers. He was released by the Steelers on August 31, 2013

=== Toronto Argonauts ===
On May 14, 2015, Rolle signed with the Toronto Argonauts of the Canadian Football League. He retired on February 4, 2016.

== Personal ==
Rolle is a distant cousin of former Arizona Cardinals defensive back Antrel Rolle, former Tennessee Titans defensive back Samari Rolle, and former Tennessee Titans defensive back Myron Rolle. He is also related to former Cincinnati Bengals wide receiver Chad Johnson. Rolle is a native of Immokalee, Florida.
