= Javarris James =

American football player (born 1987)

No. 42
- Position: Running back

Personal information
- Born: September 18, 1987 (age 39); Immokalee, Florida, U.S.
- Listed height: 6 ft 0 in (1.83 m)
- Listed weight: 208 lb (94 kg)

Career information
- High school: Immokalee
- College: Miami (FL)
- NFL draft: 2010: undrafted

Career history
- Indianapolis Colts (2010)*; New England Patriots (2010)*; Washington Redskins (2010)*; Indianapolis Colts (2010−2011); Arizona Cardinals (2012)
- * Offseason or practice squad member only

Career NFL statistics
- Rushing attempts: 46
- Rushing yards: 112
- Rushing touchdowns: 6
- Receptions: 9
- Receiving yards: 63
- Stats at Pro Football Reference

Javarris James (born September 18, 1987) is an American former professional football player who was a running back in the National Football League (NFL). He played college football for the Miami Hurricanes and was signed by the Indianapolis Colts as an undrafted free agent in 2010.

He was also a member of the New England Patriots, Washington Redskins and Arizona Cardinals. He is the younger cousin of NFL Hall of Fame running back Edgerrin James, who also played college football in Miami and later for the Colts.

== Early life ==
James attended Immokalee High School in Immokalee, Florida. As a freshman, James rushed for more than 800 yards and had 16 touchdowns. As a sophomore, he rushed 165 times for 1,145 yards and 14 touchdowns. He developed further as a junior, rushing 225 times for 1,658 yards and 28 touchdowns while leading the Indians to the state title. He suffered a knee injury during his senior year that kept him out of five games, but he returned to the lineup and still rushed for over 1,000 yards and 14 touchdowns.

He was rated as the 13th best running back in the nation by Rivals.com, who also rated him the 21st best overall player in Florida, while Scout.com ranked him as the 35th best running back in the country. ESPN.com ranked James as the 21st best running back in the nation, as well as the 144th best player in the country. The Miami Herald named James as No. 4 on their Top 25 list of the state's best players, while the Orlando Sentinel rated him as the 11th best player in the state. James was named to the PrepStar 200 as the 18th best running back, and was also rated the second best running back on The Florida Times-Union Super 75.

== College career ==
James was heavily recruited by Miami, USC, Florida, South Florida, Nebraska, and Oklahoma. James chose to follow in the footsteps of his cousin, Edgerrin James and play for Miami, where he wore the same #5 jersey his cousin wore during his days at Miami.

James, as a true freshman, played in the first game of the 2006 season against rival Florida State. Head coach Larry Coker named James the starting running back by the fourth game of the season. James responded by rushing for 148 yards on 18 carries, an 8.2 yards per carry average, and a touchdown in his first college start against Houston. The 148 yards were a school record for a freshman, topping Clinton Portis's old mark of 147 yards. In recognition of his accomplishment, James was named the ACC Rookie of the Week. James broke the 100-yard barrier again in his next start, as he ran for 111 yards and a touchdown against North Carolina. James surpassed the 100-yard mark the third time in Miami's October 28 loss to Georgia Tech, rushing for 112 yards on 19 carries. James suffered a hip pointer injury early in the first half of Miami's November 7 game against Virginia Tech. He finished his freshman season with 175 rushing attempts for 802 yards, second most in school history for a freshman, and 4 touchdowns. He caught one receiving touchdown along with 200 total receiving yards over the course of the season.

As a sophomore, James was bothered by an ankle and neck injury all season long but started 12 games and managed to rush 159 times for 582 yards and 4 touchdowns, while catching 14 passes for 100 yards in his sophomore season. In 2008, as a junior, James played in nine games, starting only one, finishing with 286 yards on 62 carries and four touchdowns, missing four games due to injury. In 2009, his senior season, James started 5 of 12 games played, rushing for 492 yards and six touchdowns.

== Professional career ==
=== Indianapolis Colts ===
After going undrafted in the 2010 NFL draft, James signed with the Indianapolis Colts on April 30, 2010. On September 4, 2010, James was waived by the Colts during final cuts.

=== New England Patriots ===
On September 6, 2010, James was signed to the New England Patriots' practice squad. He was released on October 5, 2010.

=== Washington Redskins ===
James was signed to the practice squad of the Washington Redskins on October 6, 2010.

=== Return to the Colts ===
On October 7, 2010, the Colts signed James off the Redskins' practice squad to their active roster. He made his NFL debut as a reserve in the Colts' Week 5 game against the Kansas City Chiefs on October 10, 2010. James scored two rushing touchdowns in the Colts' loss at the Philadelphia Eagles on November 7, 2010.

James did not make the final roster for the 2011 season and was released by the Colts again on September 3, 2011.

=== Arizona Cardinals ===
On May 14, 2012, James signed with the Arizona Cardinals.

== Personal life ==
On June 9, 2011, James was arrested in Fort Myers, Florida, for possession of marijuana. He was released a short time later after posting a $1,000 bond.

On March 7, 2013, James was arrested for failure to appear for his previous possession of marijuana charge. He is being held with no bond.

On May 12, 2017, James finished his schooling obtaining his bachelor's degree and MBA by graduating from the University of Miami.

On February 28, 2019, James opened up a training facility in Naples, FL called "JJ5 Fitness" under the LLC. of JJ5 Fitness.

James now resides in Naples, FL with his wife and children. He coaches local youth football and track. James has also held various youth football camps throughout the Southwest Florida area.
