= Immokalee, Florida =

- Census-designated place
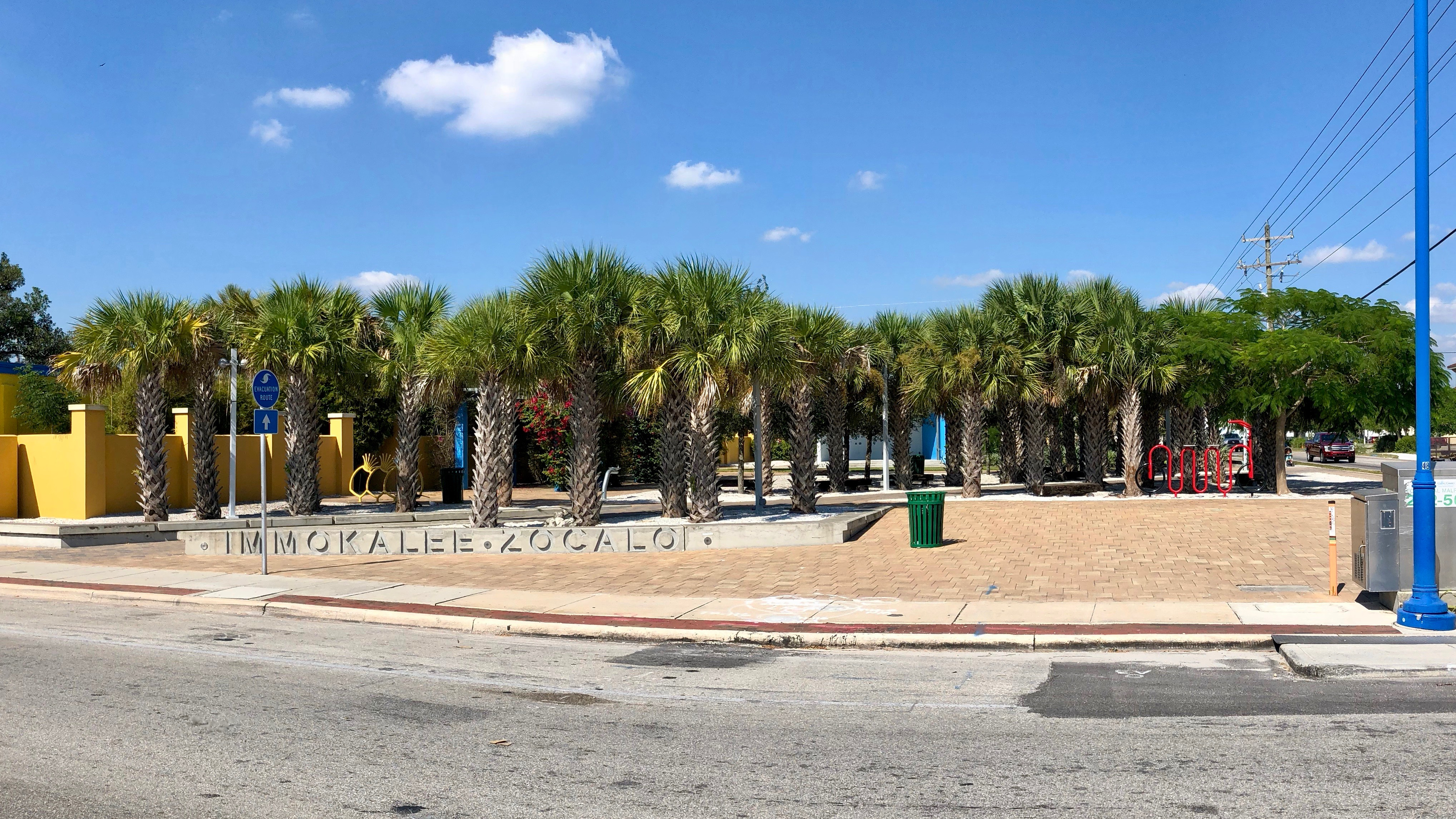
- Immokalee Zocalo Public Plaza
- Etymology: Mikasuki: Immokalee (your home)
- Location in Collier County and the state of Florida
- Coordinates: 26°25′52″N 81°27′32″W
- Country: United States
- State: Florida
- County: Collier

Area
  - Total: 23.29 sq mi (60.32 km^{2})
  - Land: 22.72 sq mi (58.85 km^{2})
  - Water: 0.57 sq mi (1.48 km^{2})
- Elevation: 36 ft (11 m)

Population (2020)
  - Total: 24,557
  - Density: 1,081/sq mi (417.3/km^{2})
- Time zone: UTC-5 (Eastern (EST))
  - Summer (DST): UTC-4 (EDT)
- ZIP codes: 34142–34143
- Area code: 239
- FIPS code: 12-33250
- GNIS feature ID: 2402609

Immokalee (/ɪˈmɒk(ə)li/ ih-MOK-(ə)-lee) is an unincorporated community and census-designated place in Collier County, Florida, United States. The population was 24,557 at the 2020 census, up from 24,154 at the 2010 census. It is part of the Naples–Marco Island metropolitan area.

== History ==
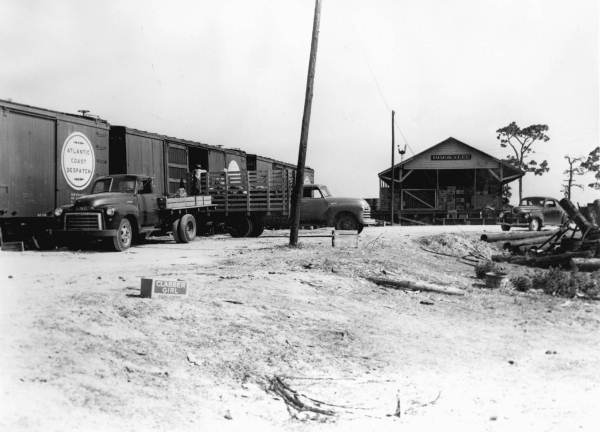
Former Atlantic Coast Line Railroad Immokalee Depot

The region was settled by the Calusa people. It was inhabited by the Seminole centuries later, after they moved down from northern Florida. Initially the settlement was known as Gopher Ridge by the Seminole and Miccosukee nations. Immokalee means "your home" in the Mikasuki language.

When the swamps were drained in the region, agriculture became the dominant industry. European-American hunters, trappers, Native American traders, cowmen, and missionaries moved in before permanent villages developed. The first permanent settlement was founded in 1872. In 1921, the Atlantic Coast Line Railroad extended its Haines City Branch south to Immokalee. The railroad was removed in 1989.

The Immokalee area is heavily agricultural. It is one of the nation's major centers of tomato growing. In 1960, CBS News anchor Edward R. Murrow reported on the region's farms' working conditions for his Harvest of Shame report for CBS Reports, which described the harsh lives of migrant workers.

== Geography ==
Immokalee is in northern Collier County along Florida State Road 29. LaBelle is 24 miles (39 km) north, and Interstate 75 (Alligator Alley) is 20 miles (32 km) south.

According to the United States Census Bureau, the CDP has an area of 23.3 square miles (60.3 km^{2}), of which 22.7 square miles (58.8 km^{2}) is land and 0.58 square miles (1.5 km^{2}), or 2.42%, is water.

=== Climate ===
Immokalee features a humid subtropical climate (Köppen: Cfa).

Climate data for Immokalee, Florida, 1991–2020 normals, extremes 1970–2016
| Month | Jan | Feb | Mar | Apr | May | Jun | Jul | Aug | Sep | Oct | Nov | Dec | Year |
|---|---|---|---|---|---|---|---|---|---|---|---|---|---|
| Record high °F (°C) | 89 (32) | 90 (32) | 99 (37) | 96 (36) | 100 (38) | 102 (39) | 98 (37) | 100 (38) | 98 (37) | 95 (35) | 95 (35) | 89 (32) | 102 (39) |
| Mean maximum °F (°C) | 84.8 (29.3) | 86.5 (30.3) | 89.2 (31.8) | 91.3 (32.9) | 94.9 (34.9) | 96.2 (35.7) | 95.5 (35.3) | 95.9 (35.5) | 94.5 (34.7) | 91.9 (33.3) | 88.6 (31.4) | 85.6 (29.8) | 97.3 (36.3) |
| Mean daily maximum °F (°C) | 75.5 (24.2) | 78.1 (25.6) | 81.2 (27.3) | 85.4 (29.7) | 89.5 (31.9) | 91.3 (32.9) | 92.3 (33.5) | 92.0 (33.3) | 90.3 (32.4) | 86.9 (30.5) | 81.3 (27.4) | 77.6 (25.3) | 85.1 (29.5) |
| Daily mean °F (°C) | 63.9 (17.7) | 66.4 (19.1) | 69.2 (20.7) | 73.5 (23.1) | 78.1 (25.6) | 81.8 (27.7) | 83.1 (28.4) | 83.2 (28.4) | 82.2 (27.9) | 77.7 (25.4) | 70.8 (21.6) | 66.5 (19.2) | 74.7 (23.7) |
| Mean daily minimum °F (°C) | 52.2 (11.2) | 54.6 (12.6) | 57.2 (14.0) | 61.6 (16.4) | 66.7 (19.3) | 72.3 (22.4) | 73.9 (23.3) | 74.5 (23.6) | 74.0 (23.3) | 68.5 (20.3) | 60.2 (15.7) | 55.3 (12.9) | 64.2 (17.9) |
| Mean minimum °F (°C) | 32.1 (0.1) | 34.5 (1.4) | 40.5 (4.7) | 46.4 (8.0) | 56.3 (13.5) | 65.1 (18.4) | 68.8 (20.4) | 69.9 (21.1) | 67.4 (19.7) | 54.0 (12.2) | 45.1 (7.3) | 35.8 (2.1) | 29.7 (−1.3) |
| Record low °F (°C) | 20 (−7) | 25 (−4) | 30 (−1) | 38 (3) | 49 (9) | 54 (12) | 63 (17) | 64 (18) | 64 (18) | 41 (5) | 27 (−3) | 24 (−4) | 20 (−7) |
| Average precipitation inches (mm) | 2.72 (69) | 1.90 (48) | 2.17 (55) | 2.56 (65) | 4.16 (106) | 7.87 (200) | 6.77 (172) | 7.40 (188) | 5.98 (152) | 3.18 (81) | 1.53 (39) | 1.77 (45) | 48.01 (1,219) |
| Average precipitation days (≥ 0.01 in) | 6.4 | 5.7 | 6.0 | 6.7 | 7.5 | 15.3 | 16.4 | 17.7 | 15.2 | 8.9 | 5.2 | 5.3 | 116.3 |
Source: NOAA (mean maxima/minima 1981–2010)

== Demographics ==
Historical population
| Census | Pop. | Note | %± |
|---|---|---|---|
| 1960 | 3,224 | | — |
| 1970 | 3,764 | | 16.7% |
| 1980 | 11,038 | | 193.3% |
| 1990 | 14,120 | | 27.9% |
| 2000 | 19,763 | | 40.0% |
| 2010 | 24,154 | | 22.2% |
| 2020 | 24,557 | | 1.7% |

=== 2020 census ===
As of the 2020 census, Immokalee had a population of 24,557. The median age was 28.8 years. 32.9% of residents were under the age of 18 and 7.9% of residents were 65 years of age or older. For every 100 females there were 109.6 males, and for every 100 females age 18 and over there were 110.0 males age 18 and over.

95.6% of residents lived in urban areas, while 4.4% lived in rural areas.

There were 6,609 households in Immokalee, of which 53.3% had children under the age of 18 living in them. Of all households, 40.8% were married-couple households, 21.4% were households with a male householder and no spouse or partner present, and 28.0% were households with a female householder and no spouse or partner present. About 14.7% of all households were made up of individuals and 5.0% had someone living alone who was 65 years of age or older.

There were 7,222 housing units, of which 8.5% were vacant. The homeowner vacancy rate was 0.4% and the rental vacancy rate was 5.5%.

Racial composition as of the 2020 census
| Race | Number | Percent |
|---|---|---|
| White | 4,593 | 18.7% |
| Black or African American | 4,995 | 20.3% |
| American Indian and Alaska Native | 560 | 2.3% |
| Asian | 45 | 0.2% |
| Native Hawaiian and Other Pacific Islander | 11 | 0.0% |
| Some other race | 8,153 | 33.2% |
| Two or more races | 6,200 | 25.2% |
| Hispanic or Latino (of any race) | 18,549 | 75.5% |

Immokalee racial composition (Hispanics excluded from racial categories) (NH = Non-Hispanic)
| Race | Number | Percentage |
|---|---|---|
| White (NH) | 709 | 2.89% |
| Black or African American (NH) | 4,875 | 19.85% |
| Native American or Alaska Native (NH) | 70 | 0.29% |
| Asian (NH) | 37 | 0.15% |
| Pacific Islander (NH) | 3 | 0.01% |
| Some Other Race (NH) | 75 | 0.31% |
| Mixed/Multi-Racial (NH) | 239 | 0.97% |
| Hispanic or Latino | 18,549 | 75.53% |
| Total | 24,557 | |

=== 2010 census ===
Immokalee's population was 24,154 at the 2010 census. It is part of the Naples–Marco Island Metropolitan Statistical Area.

=== 2000 census ===
As of the census of 2000, there were 19,763 people, 4,715 households, and 3,635 families residing in the CDP. The population density was 2,449.1 inhabitants per square mile (945.6/km^{2}). There were 4,987 housing units at an average density of 618.0 per square mile (238.6/km^{2}). The racial makeup of the CDP was 70.98% Hispanic (Of Any race), 18.03% African American, 3.19% White, 1.03% Native American, 0.20% Asian, 0.19% Pacific Islander, 35.66% from other races, and 6.38% from two or more races.

There were 4,715 households, out of which 49.7% had children under the age of 18 living with them, 45.5% were married couples living together, 20.0% had a female householder with no husband present, and 22.9% were non-families. 13.1% of all households were made up of individuals, and 3.9% had someone living alone who was 65 years of age or older. The average household size was 3.91 and the average family size was 4.10.

In the CDP, the population was spread out, with 34.9% under the age of 18, 15.7% from 18 to 24, 31.2% from 25 to 44, 14.1% from 45 to 64, and 4.1% who were 65 years of age or older. The median age was 25 years. For every 100 females, there were 129.6 males. For every 100 females age 18 and over, there were 145.9 males.

The median income for a household in the CDP was $24,315, and the median income for a family was $22,628. Males had a median income of $17,875 versus $16,713 for females. The per capita income for the CDP was $8,576. About 34.6% of families and 39.8% of the population were below the poverty line, including 46.1% of those under age 18 and 26.9% of those age 65 or over.

== Arts and culture ==
The federally recognized Seminole Tribe of Florida has one of its six reservations here, Immokalee Reservation, on which it operates one of its gaming casinos.

The Audubon Society's Corkscrew Swamp Sanctuary is nearby.

== Government ==
Being unincorporated, the area has no municipal government of its own and is governed by Collier County.

== Education ==
Immokalee's public schools are operated by the District School Board of Collier County.

Elementary schools in Immokalee and serving Immokalee include Eden Park, Highlands, Lake Trafford, and Village Oaks. Pinecrest Elementary School, outside of and adjacent to the CDP, serves a portion of the CDP. All residents are zoned to Immokalee Middle School and Immokalee High School, both in the CDP.

== Media ==
Immokalee is home to WCIW-LP, a low power community radio station owned and operated by the Coalition of Immokalee Workers. The station was built by volunteers from Immokalee and around the country in December 2003 at the fifth Prometheus Radio Project barnraising. WCIW broadcasts music, news, and public affairs to listeners in Spanish, Haitian Creole and several indigenous languages.

WAFZ-FM (92.1 FM) is a full-power FM radio station licensed to Immokalee, Florida. The station plays a variety of hits in the Regional Mexican format.

WAFZ's programming is also heard on WAFZ AM 1490 in Immokalee.

== Transportation ==
Collier Area Transit provides local bus service and paratransit. The #5 connects to Naples, the #7 connects to Marco Island (limited trips), and the 8A circulates within the area.

Immokalee used to be served by the Seaboard Coast Line Railroad (formerly Atlantic Coast Line), which ran a branchline from Palmdale through Immokalee to Everglades City. The line generated considerable agricultural-related traffic. The line was cut back to Sunniland south of Immokalee in the 1950s and then abandoned to the mainline at Palmdale in the 1980s. This left Immokalee without rail service.

The main road through Immokalee is State Road 29. Other important county roads through the region are CR 29A and CR 846.

Immokalee Airport is a public-use general aviation airport 1 mile (1.6 km) northeast of the central business district. The closest airport for commercial service is Southwest Florida International Airport.

== Notable people ==
- Mackensie Alexander, cornerback
- Albert Bentley, football player for the Miami Hurricanes and the Indianapolis Colts
- J. C. Jackson, Los Angeles Chargers cornerback
- Edgerrin James, Hall of Fame running back (Indianapolis Colts)
- Javarris James, Indianapolis Colts running back
- D'Ernest Johnson, Jacksonville Jaguars running back
- Brian Rolle, former NFL and CFL linebacker
- Ovince Saint Preux, Ultimate Fighting Championship competitor
- Felipe Santos, missing person
- Deadrin Senat, defensive tackle

== See also ==
- Coalition of Immokalee Workers, a grassroots community and workers' organization in the area. The 2014 documentary Food Chains was shot in Immokalee.
