= D'Ernest Johnson =

American football player (born 1996)

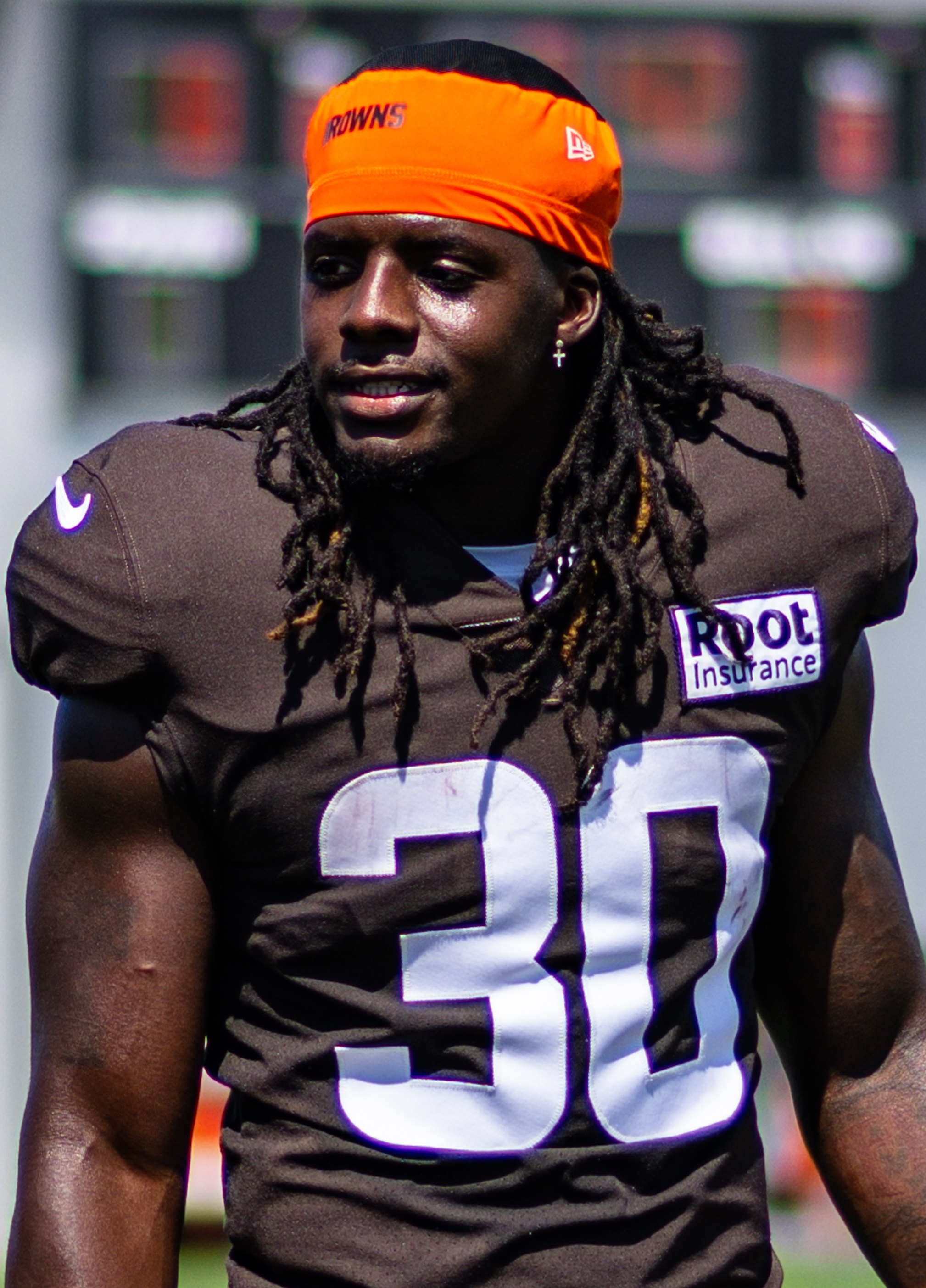
- Johnson with the Cleveland Browns in 2022

Profile
- Positions: Running back, kickoff returner

Personal information
- Born: February 27, 1996 (age 30); Immokalee, Florida, U.S.
- Listed height: 5 ft 11 in (1.80 m)
- Listed weight: 205 lb (93 kg)

Career information
- High school: Immokalee (FL)
- College: South Florida (2014–2017)
- NFL draft: 2018: undrafted

Career history
- Orlando Apollos (2019); Cleveland Browns (2019–2022); Jacksonville Jaguars (2023–2024); Baltimore Ravens (2025)*; Arizona Cardinals (2025); New England Patriots (2025); Tennessee Titans (2026)*
- * Offseason or practice squad member only

Awards and highlights
- Second-team All-AAC (2016)

Career NFL statistics as of 2025
- Rushing yards: 1,014
- Rushing average: 4.4
- Rushing touchdowns: 3
- Receptions: 53
- Receiving yards: 465
- Return yards: 922
- Stats at Pro Football Reference

D'Ernest Johnson Jr. (born February 27, 1996) is an American professional football running back and kickoff returner. He played college football for the South Florida Bulls. He has previously played for the Cleveland Browns, Jacksonville Jaguars, Arizona Cardinals, and New England Patriots, as well as the Orlando Apollos of the Alliance of American Football (AAF).

== Early life ==
Johnson attended and played high school football at Immokalee High School. He helped lead the team to the Class 5A regional semifinals where they lost 49–34 to Plantation-American Heritage. Johnson ran for 143 yards, a touchdown, and a 99-yard kickoff return in a game against American Heritage School that included Sony Michel and Isaiah McKenzie. A four-star running back recruit, Johnson committed to play college football at South Florida.

== College career ==
Johnson played four years (2014–2017) at South Florida, where he rushed 421 times for 1,796 yards and 16 touchdowns. He finished as USF's career leader in all-purpose yards (4,186), receptions by a running back (73), and receiving yards by a running back (909). He also excelled at returning kicks. Johnson spent three of his four years behind Marlon Mack. Johnson saw limited playing time as a true freshman, then earned a bigger role as a sophomore, scoring five touchdowns on 653 yards from scrimmage and averaging nearly 27 yards per kickoff return. Johnson earned second-team American Athletic Conference honors as a returner in 2016, averaging 28.9 yards per kickoff return and 11.8 yards per punt return, including one score. Johnson's return responsibilities decreased in 2017, playing a bigger role in the Bulls' run-oriented offense, as he rushed for a career high 796 yards and added nine offensive scores.

== Professional career ==
Pre-draft measurables
Height	Weight	Arm length	Hand span	Wingspan	40-yard dash	10-yard split	20-yard split	20-yard shuttle	Three-cone drill	Vertical jump	Broad jump	Bench press
5 ft 10 5/8 in (1.79 m)	200 lb (91 kg)	31 in (0.79 m)	9 5/8 in (0.24 m)	6 ft 4 1/4 in (1.94 m)	4.81 s	1.64 s	2.64 s	4.34 s	7.23 s	30.5 in (0.77 m)	9 ft 9 in (2.97 m)	20 reps
All values from Pro Day

After going undrafted in the 2018 NFL draft, Johnson was invited to the New Orleans Saints rookie minicamp but was not signed. Johnson spent the rest of 2018 fishing for mahi mahi in Key West with a friend.

=== Orlando Apollos ===
Johnson signed with the Orlando Apollos of the Alliance of American Football for its inaugural 2019 season. In eight games with the Apollos, he rushed for 372 yards and added 22 receptions for 220 yards.

=== Cleveland Browns ===
After the AAF ceased operations in April 2019, Johnson signed with the Cleveland Browns on May 16, 2019. After an impressive training camp, Johnson made the Browns' initial 53-man roster for the 2019 season. Johnson showed off his versatility during the preseason, leading the Browns with 86 rushing yards on 20 carries. He also added seven catches for 76 yards and a touchdown, while also proving value in the return game. The 5-foot-10, 208-pounder returned six kickoffs for 127 yards and 10 punts for 63 yards. He made his regular season debut with one carry for 13 yards in the Browns' 2019 season-opening loss to the Tennessee Titans. He finished the 2019 season with four carries for 21 rushing yards and six receptions for 71 receiving yards.

In Week 4 of the 2020 season, he had 13 carries for 95 rushing yards in a 49–38 victory over the Dallas Cowboys.

On October 21, 2021, he made his first career start against the Denver Broncos, as Nick Chubb and Kareem Hunt were both ruled out due to injury. Johnson ran for 146 yards on 22 carries and one touchdown, and was named Player of the Game and FedEx Ground Player of the Week.

On June 4, 2022, Johnson re-signed with Cleveland on a one-year, $2.43 million contract.

=== Jacksonville Jaguars ===
On March 23, 2023, Johnson signed with the Jacksonville Jaguars. He served as the backup to Travis Etienne and as a kick returner.

On March 13, 2024, Johnson re-signed with the Jaguars.

=== Baltimore Ravens ===
On August 2, 2025, Johnson signed with the Baltimore Ravens. On August 26 he was waived during the 53 man roster cutdown process and re-signed to the practice squad the next day. On September 24, Johnson was released.

=== Arizona Cardinals ===
On September 29, 2025, Johnson signed with the Arizona Cardinals' practice squad. He was released on October 28.

=== New England Patriots ===
On October 29, 2025, Johnson signed with the New England Patriots' practice squad. He was signed to the active roster on December 13. Johnson was released on January 12, 2026, and was re-signed to the practice squad. He had four kick returns in Super Bowl LX, a 29–13 loss to the Seattle Seahawks.

=== Tennessee Titans ===
On August 19, 2026, Johnson signed with the Tennessee Titans. On August 30, he was waived by the Titans as a part of final roster cuts before the start of the regular season.

== NFL career statistics ==
Teams				Rushing					Receiving					Fumbles	
Season	Team	GP	GS	Att	Yds	Avg	Lng	TD	Rec	Yds	Avg	Lng	TD	Fum	Lost
2019	CLE	16	0	4	21	5.3	13	0	6	71	11.8	27	0	0	0
2020	CLE	16	0	33	166	5.0	28	0	3	14	4.7	5	0	1	0
2021	CLE	17	2	100	534	5.3	30	3	19	137	7.2	18	0	1	0
2022	CLE	15	0	4	17	4.3	7	0	3	7	2.3	7	0	0	0
2023	JAX	17	0	41	108	2.6	19	0	10	140	14.0	42	0	0	0
2024	JAX	14	1	32	143	4.5	22	0	12	96	8.0	26	0	0	0
2025	ARI	1	0	1	0	0	0	0	0	0	0	0	0	0	0
2025	NE	7	0	13	25	1.9	5	0	0	0	0	0	0	0	0
Career		103	3	228	1,014	4.4	52	3	53	465	8.8	68	0	2	0
